= Colombian literature =

Colombian literature, as an expression of the culture of Colombia, is heterogeneous due to the coexistence of Spanish, African and Native American heritages in an extremely diverse geography. Five distinct historical and cultural traditions can be identified, with their own socioeconomic history: the Caribbean coast, Greater Antioquia, the Cundinamarca-Boyacá Highlands, Greater Tolima and the Western Valley. Colombia produced one of the richest literatures of Latin America, as much for its abundance as for its variety and innovation during the 19th and 20th centuries. Colombian intellectuals who forged the literature of this period also contributed decisively to the consolidation of Latin American literature. Colombia´s most important novels deal with monoculture and extraction of raw materials: One hundred years of solitude (Banana) by Gabriel Garcia Marquez, Maria by Jose Isaacs (Sugar cane) and La vorágine (Rubber) by Jose Eustasio Rivera.

== Conquest and early colonial period (1499-1810) ==
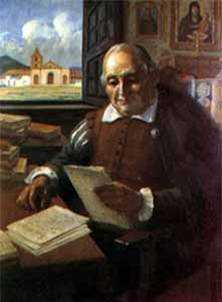
Juan Rodríguez Freyle was an early writer in the New Kingdom of Granada. His major work El Carnero is a collection of stories, anecdotes and rumours about the early days of colonial Colombia and the demise of the Muisca Confederation

Under the Spanish Empire, major literary topics included conquest narratives, chronicles, religious devotion, and love themes. Some of the best-known authors of this period are:

- Gonzalo Jiménez de Quesada (1496 -other sources state 1506 or 1509 – Suesca, 16 February 1579) - First chronicler as he kept diaries of his own conquests, main conquistador of large parts of Colombia, may have been the (partial) author of Epítome de la conquista del Nuevo Reino de Granada (not published until 1889), his diaries were published in 1576
- Juan de Castellanos (Alanís, Sevilla, 9 March 1522 - Tunja, November 1606) - Wrote the longest poem ever in the Spanish language, Elegías de varones ilustres de Indias (1589)
- Pedro Simón (San Lorenzo de la Parrilla, Spain, 1574 - Ubaté, ca. 1628) - Friar who wrote Noticias historiales de las conquistas de Tierra Firme en las Indias occidentales about the Spanish conquest in 1626
- Juan Rodríguez Freyle (Bogotá, 25 April 1566 - Bogotá, 1642) - Spanish priest, wrote the extensive chronicle of the Spanish conquest of the Muisca; El Carnero ("The Sheep"), first published in 1638
- Hernando Domínguez Camargo (Bogotá, 1606 – Tunja, 1659) - Jesuit priest and writer. His work was influenced by the Spanish poet Luis de Góngora, in a cultural trend known as the Indias Baroque. His most recognized works are "Epic Poem to St Ignacio of Loyola" and "Bouquet of poetic flowers"
- Lucas Fernández de Piedrahita (Bogotá, 1624 — Ciudad de Panamá, 29 March 1688) - Published Historia general de las conquistas del Nuevo Reino de Granada, a major work about the Spanish conquest and the indigenous peoples of Colombia in 1676
- Francisco Álvarez de Velasco y Zorrilla (Bogotá, 1647 – Madrid, 1708) - His main work was Rhytmica Sacra, Moral y Laudatiria. His writings show admiration for the work of Francisco de Quevedo and Sor Juana Inés de la Cruz
- Francisca Josefa de Castillo y Guevara (Tunja, 1671 – Tunja, 1742) - nun, recognized as one of the most important female authors of mysticism for her Afectos espirituales and her Vida (memoirs).
- Felipe de Vergara Azcárate (1745-1818) was one of the most notable writers of the Colombian colony, wrote more than 42 works, including Elements of Natural Philosophy that contain the principles of physics, demonstrated by mathematics and confirmed with observations and experiences, Elements of Plane Geometry, Elements of arithmetic, Elements of Astronomy, Discourse on the appeal, on the royal patronage and Genealogical history of the author's family, from the conquest to 1800. and others in different subjects such as philosophy, theology, literature, mathematics.

== Emancipation and national consolidation (1780-1830) ==
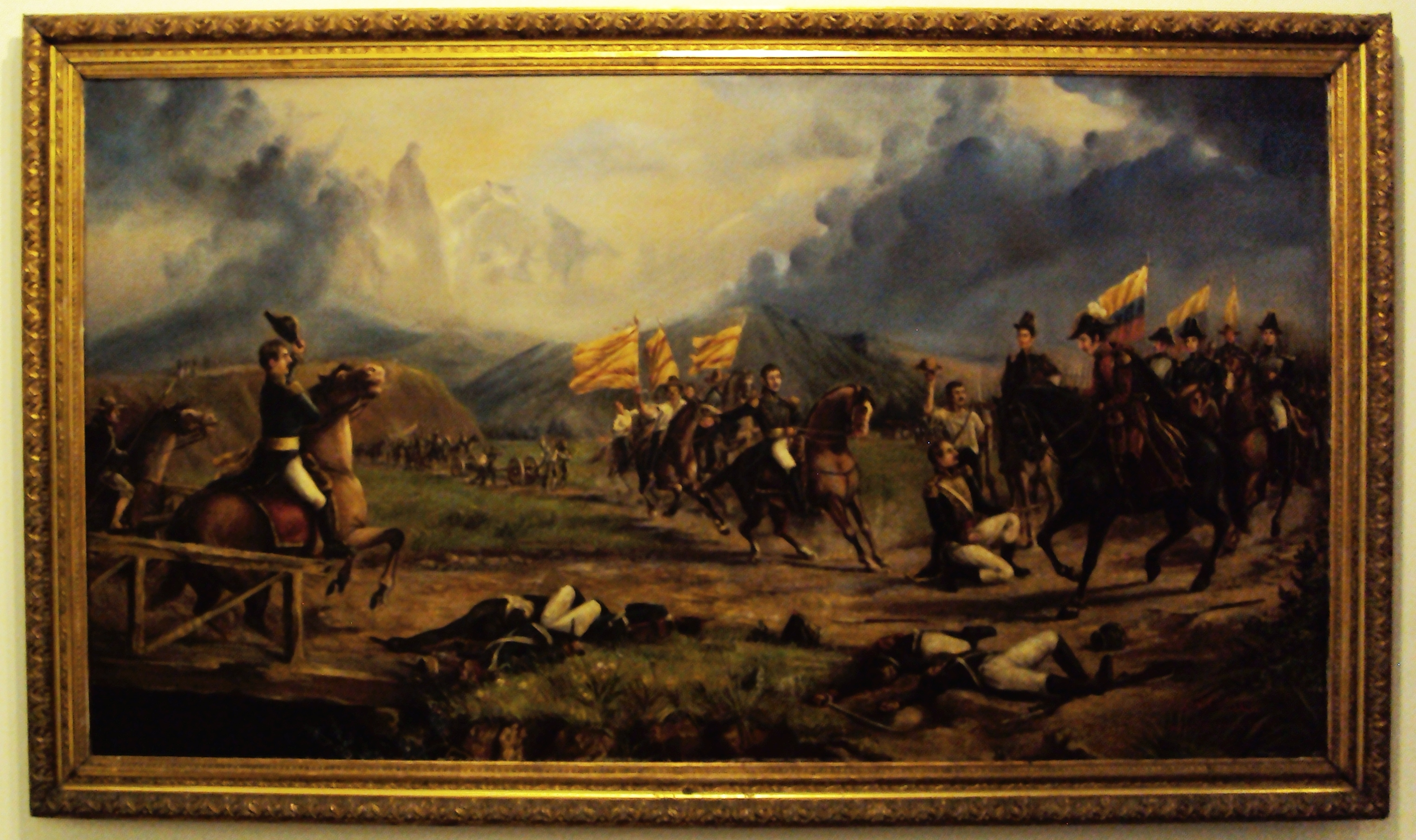
The republic forces defeated the Spanish Empire in the Battle of Boyacá

During the process of independence, Colombian literature was strongly influenced by the political motivations of the moment. The main literary movements were close to Romanticism.

During the nineteenth century, political writing was led by Simón Bolívar. Local journalism was initiated by Antonio Nariño. The Colombian government established the first Academy of Spanish language in the American continent, in 1871.

Other relevant authors were:

- Camilo Torres Tenorio
- Francisco Antonio Zea
- José Fernández Madrid (February 19, 1789 – June 28, 1830).

== Costumbrismo ==
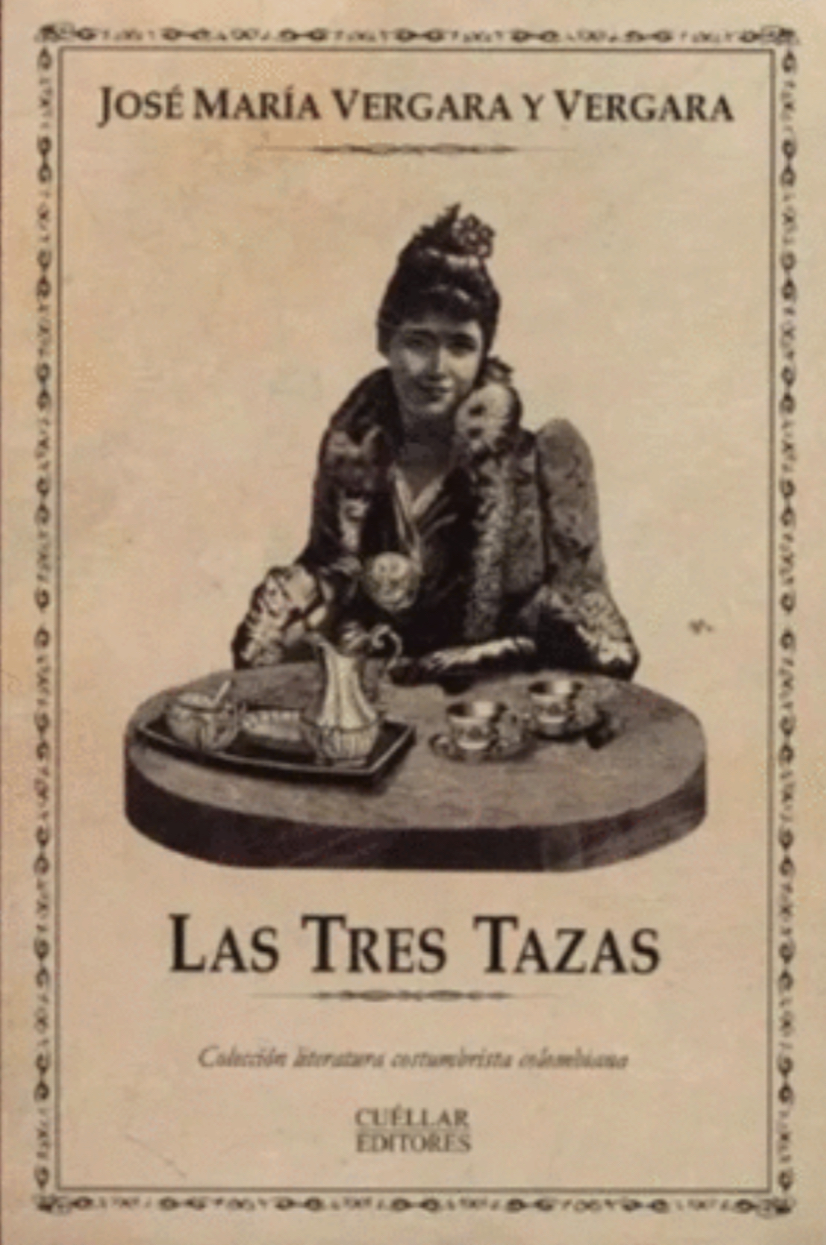
Las tres tazas by José María Vergara y Vergara

In the late nineteenth and early twentieth centuries, the main topic in Colombian literature was the colourful depiction of peasant life, tied to strong criticism of society and government. This type of literature was called costumbrista literature. Some of the authors of this period are:

- José Maria Vergara y Vergara
- Tomás Carrasquilla
- Adolfo León Gómez
- José María Cordovez Moure
- Eustaquio Palacios
- Jorge Isaacs
- Julio Arboleda
- Gregorio Gutiérrez González
- Rafael Pombo
- Soledad Acosta
- Josefa Acevedo de Gomez
- Candelario Obeso
- Manuel Ancízar

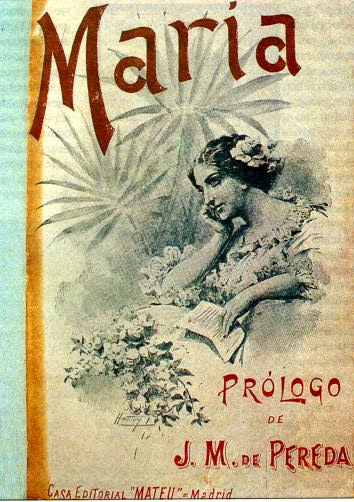
María is a novel written by Colombian writer Jorge Isaacs. It is a costumbrist novel representative of the Spanish romantic movement.

== Modern literature ==
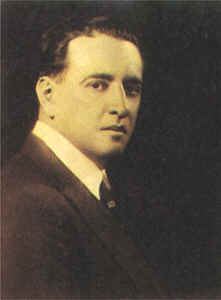
José Eustasio Rivera in 1928, author of La Vorágine, a novel that depicts the brutal slavery of the native American forced to harvest latex from the Para rubber tree.

Modernismo and modernism are reactions against the previous literature of Romanticism. Modernism's main topics are ugliness and mystery. The main modern writers are:

- Emilia Ayarza
- Jose Eustasio Rivera
- Rafael Maya
- León de Greiff
- Luis Vidales
- Luis Carlos López
- Germán Arciniegas
- Porfirio Barba-Jacob
- José María Vargas Vila

== Stone and Sky (Piedra y Cielo) ==
The industrialization process in Latin America during the twentieth century generated new literary movements such as the poetic movement named “Piedra y cielo” (1939). Its main authors are:

- Eduardo Carranza
- Jorge Gaitán Durán
- Jorge Rojas
- Arturo Camacho Ramírez
- Augusto Pinilla

== Nothing-ism (Nadaísmo) ==
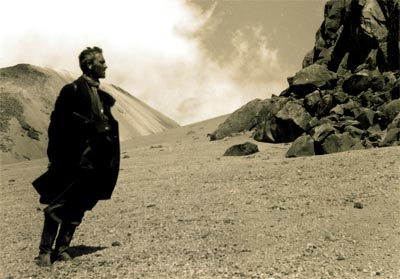
Fernando González in Nevado del Ruiz Snow Mountain in 1929 during the visits that inspired his work "Viaje a pie" ("Trip By Foot"). González is considered one of the most original writers of Colombia during the 20th century. His ideas were controversial and had a great influence in the Colombian society at his time and today. The González work was the inspiration of Nadaism, a literary movement founded by one of his disciples, Gonzalo Arango.

The violent events in Colombia during the 1940s and 1950s, such as La Violencia and the military government of Gustavo Rojas Pinilla, as well as a considerable urban expansion, influenced in the formation of the Nadaísta (Nothing-ist) movement, which was the Colombian expression of numerous avant-garde-like movements in the poetry of the Americas during the 1950s and 60s (such as the *Beat Generation in the United States and the Tzanticos in Ecuador). Nadaísmo included elements of existentialism and nihilism, a dynamic incorporation of city life, and a generally irreverent, iconoclastic flavor. Authors who were part of this movement include:

- Gonzalo Arango
- Jotamario Arbeláez
- Eduardo Escobar
- Fanny Buitrago
- Patricia Ariza
- Jaime Jaramillo Escobar

== The Boom ==
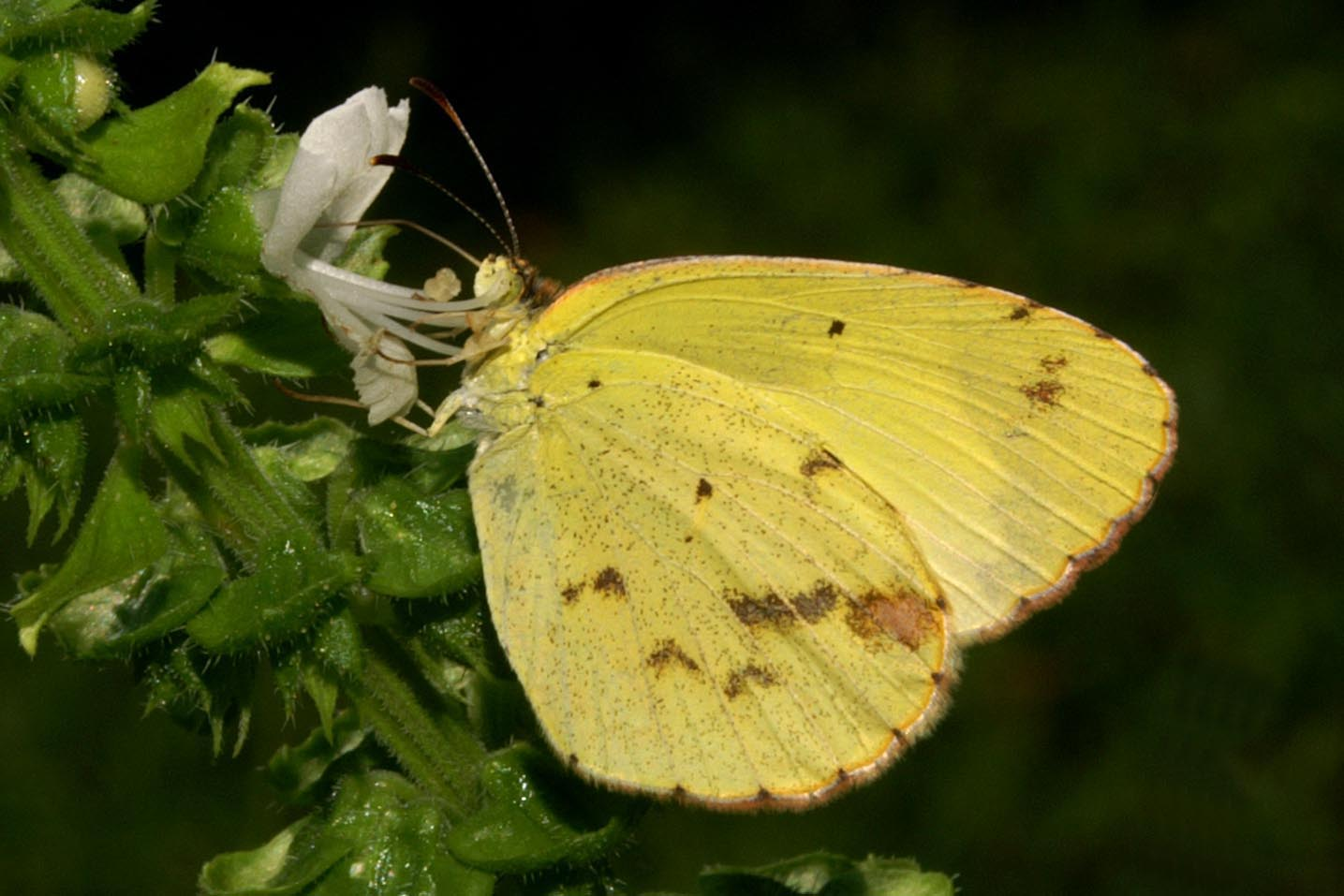
Yellow butterflies are a distinctive feature in One Hundred Years of Solitude by Gabriel García Márquez

The Latin American Boom was a prolific period for Colombian literature.

- Gabriel García Márquez
- Eduardo Caballero Calderón
- Manuel Mejía Vallejo
- Álvaro Mutis
- Manuel Zapata Olivella
- Andres Caicedo
- Alfredo Iriarte
- Germán Arciniegas
- Álvaro Cepeda Samudio

== Contemporary authors ==
- Germán Castro Caycedo
- Daniel Samper Pizano
- Fernando Vallejo
- Laura Restrepo
- Andrés Felipe Solano
- Juan B Gutierrez
- María Mercedes Carranza
- Germán Espinosa
- David Sánchez Juliao
- Mario Mendoza Zambrano
- Héctor Abad Faciolince
- Rafael Chaparro Madiedo
- Juan Gabriel Vásquez
- William Ospina
- Consuelo Triviño Anzola
- Santiago Gamboa
- Pilar Quintana
- Emma Reyes
- Juan Pablo Plata
- Melba Escobar
- Juan Gossaín
- Juan Cárdenas (writer)
- Carolina Sanín
- Giuseppe Caputo
- Juan Esteban Constaín
- Daniel Ferreira (writer)
- Felipe Restrepo Pombo
- Cristian Romero (writer)
- Andrés Caicedo
- Luis Carlos Barragán

== Disillusioned Generation / Generación Desencantada ==
This generation groups a broad and ambiguous list of writers, poets who began to publish after the Nadaísmo movement (see above) in the 1970s. Poets like Giovanni Quessep, Harold Alvarado Tenorio, Juan Gustavo Cobo Borda, Elkin Restrepo, José Manuel Arango, Darío Jaramillo Agudelo, Augusto Pinilla, María Mercedes Carranza, and Juan Manuel Roca among many others, have been considered part of this generation, although they have differences in style, themes and ideology.

== Recent generations ==
Some writers like Cristian Valencia, Alberto Salcedo Ramos and Jorge Enrique Botero, have written literary journalism, close to Gonzo style. In fiction there are authors like Hector Abad Faciolince, Santiago Gamboa, Orlando Echeverri Benedetti, Juan Sebastian Cardenas, Nahum Montt, Miguel Mendoza Luna, Sebastian Pineda Buitrago, Mauricio Loza, Ignacio Arroyave Piedrhíta, Antonio Garcia, Mario Mendoza, James Canon, Ricardo Abdahllah, Juan Pablo Plata, Evelio Rosero Diago, Antonio Ungar, Laura Restrepo, Ruben Varona, William Ospina, David Alberto Campos, Oscar Perdomo Gamboa, Juan Esteban Constain, Juan Álvarez, Andrés Del Castillo, Antonio Iriarte Cadena, Esmir Garcés, Antonieta Villamil, Winston Morales, Efraim Medina Reyes, Ricardo Silva Romero and many others.

== Recent poetry ==
In recent decades, in Colombia there has been a significant number of poets of importance, who deal with urban issues and anti-poetry. Among them are Antonieta Villamil, Andrea Cote, Lucia Estrada, Felipe García Quintero, whose poetry has been recognized internationally.

== Poetry ==
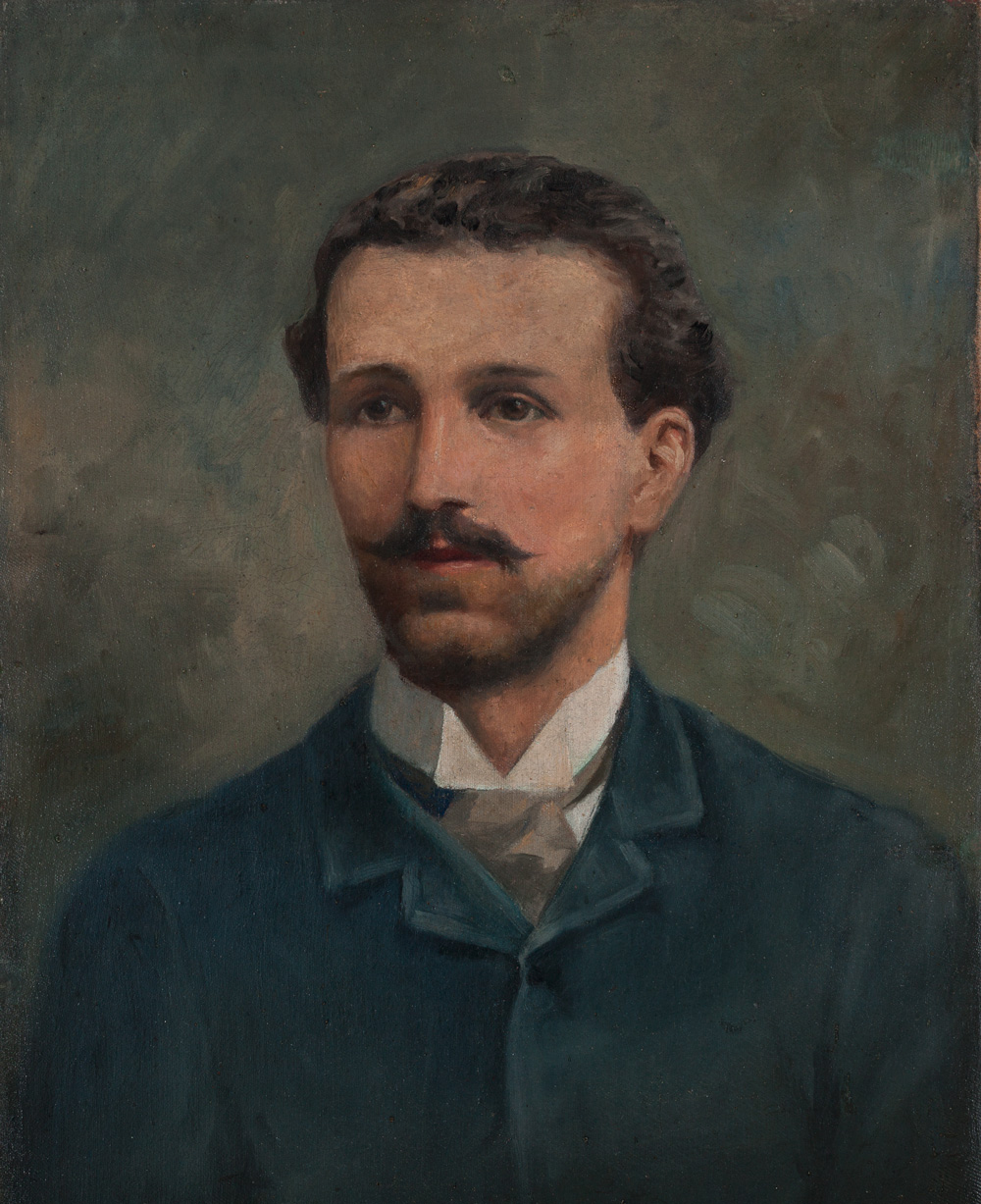
José Asunción Silva was a Colombian poet. He is considered one of the founders of Spanish–American Modernism.

- Emilia Ayarza
- José Asunción Silva
- Porfirio Barba-Jacob
- Piedad Bonnet
- Antonieta Villamil
- José Fernández Madrid
- Jorge Isaacs
- Rafael Pombo
- Zacarías Reyán
- Julio Flórez
- José María Samper

== Children's literature ==
Some of the characters most recognized in Colombian children's literature and the popular imaginary are the stock characters created by Rafael Pombo, which are often found in nursery rhymes, familiar folk tales and in the textbooks for elementary school.

Other important children literature authors are:

- Jairo Anibal Niño: with his works "La alegria de querer" (The joy of love), "Razzgo, Indo y Zas", "Catalino Bocachica" among others
- Euclides Jaramillo: with the "Tales of Uncle rabbit"
- From the 1980s, young adult fiction authors Gloria Cecilia Díaz, Irene Vasco, Evelio José Rosero, Yolanda Reyes and Pilar Lozano introduced new subjects for the genre such as conflict, kidnapping, death and fear.
- Recent picture book voices include the work of Ivar da Coll, Claudia Rueda, Jairo Buitrago and Rafael Yockteng

== Historians ==
19th-century

- Soledad Acosta
- Joaquín Acosta
- Joaquín Camacho
- Margarita Diez-Colunje y Pombo
- José María Samper
- Manuel Uribe Ángel
- José María Restrepo Saenz
- José María Vergara y Vergara
- Francisco Javier Vergara y Velasco

20th-century

- Jesús Arango Cano
- Germán Arciniegas
- Gustavo Bell
- Néstor Botero Goldsworthy
- Marianne Cardale de Schrimpff
- Gonzalo Corréal Urrego
- Juan Friede
- Jorge Gamboa Mendoza
- Gabriel Giraldo Zuluaga
- Camilo González
- Ana María Groot
- Fernando Guillén Martínez
- Jaime Jaramillo Uribe
- Antonio Caballero Holguín
- Alberto Quijano Guerrero
- Miguel Triana
- Helwar Figueroa

== See also ==
- List of Colombian writers
- Biblioteca de la Presidencia de Colombia
- LGBT literature in Colombia
- List of libraries in Colombia
