= La Movida Literaria =

2004–2009 Colombian literary magazine

- Editor: Juan Pablo Plata
- Categories: Literary magazine
- Frequency: Annual
- Publisher: La Movida
- Paid circulation: 1500
- Unpaid circulation: 500
- Total circulation (2004): 10000
- First issue: 21 January 2004
- Final issue: August 2009
- Company: La Movida Literaria
- Country: Colombia
- Based in: Bogotá, Cundinamarca, Colombia

La Movida Literaria was a Colombian literary magazine created in 2004, it circulated and had its web site until 2010. From its beginnings as a blog included literary criticism, poetry, fiction and non fiction, and later as a magazine was responsible for disseminating the emerging literature of Colombia in the 21st century with its five print editions (The last one came out in August 2009). The publication was awarded as the best web portal and best interview - to David Manzur - by the Colombian journalistic organization Andiarios. It was sold in bookshops and was distributed free of charge in universities. The magazine was sponsored by the Colombian authors Germán Espinosa and R. H. Moreno Durán. Many of the authors who published at the time in the magazine have been chosen for the two editions of Bogotá 39 and also for selection of the 25 best kept secrets of Latin America literature, selection convened by the International Book Fair of Guadalajara in 2011. The magazine was a recognized as an independent magazine, which open the door for new literary voices and made various free literary events, particularly in Bogotá. It also had a prize literary of short stories in 2009 which was obtained by the writer Ángel Unfried, the editor in chief El Malpensante magazine.

== Members and contributors of La Movida Literaria ==
- Alonso Quijano
- Jesse Tagen Mills
- David Roa Castaño
- Carlos (Ios) Fernández Utica
- Juan Pablo Plata
- Sebastián Pineda Buitrago
- Germám Espinosa
- R.H. Moreno Durán
