= Francisca Josefa de la Concepción =

Mother Francisca Josefa de la Concepción OSC
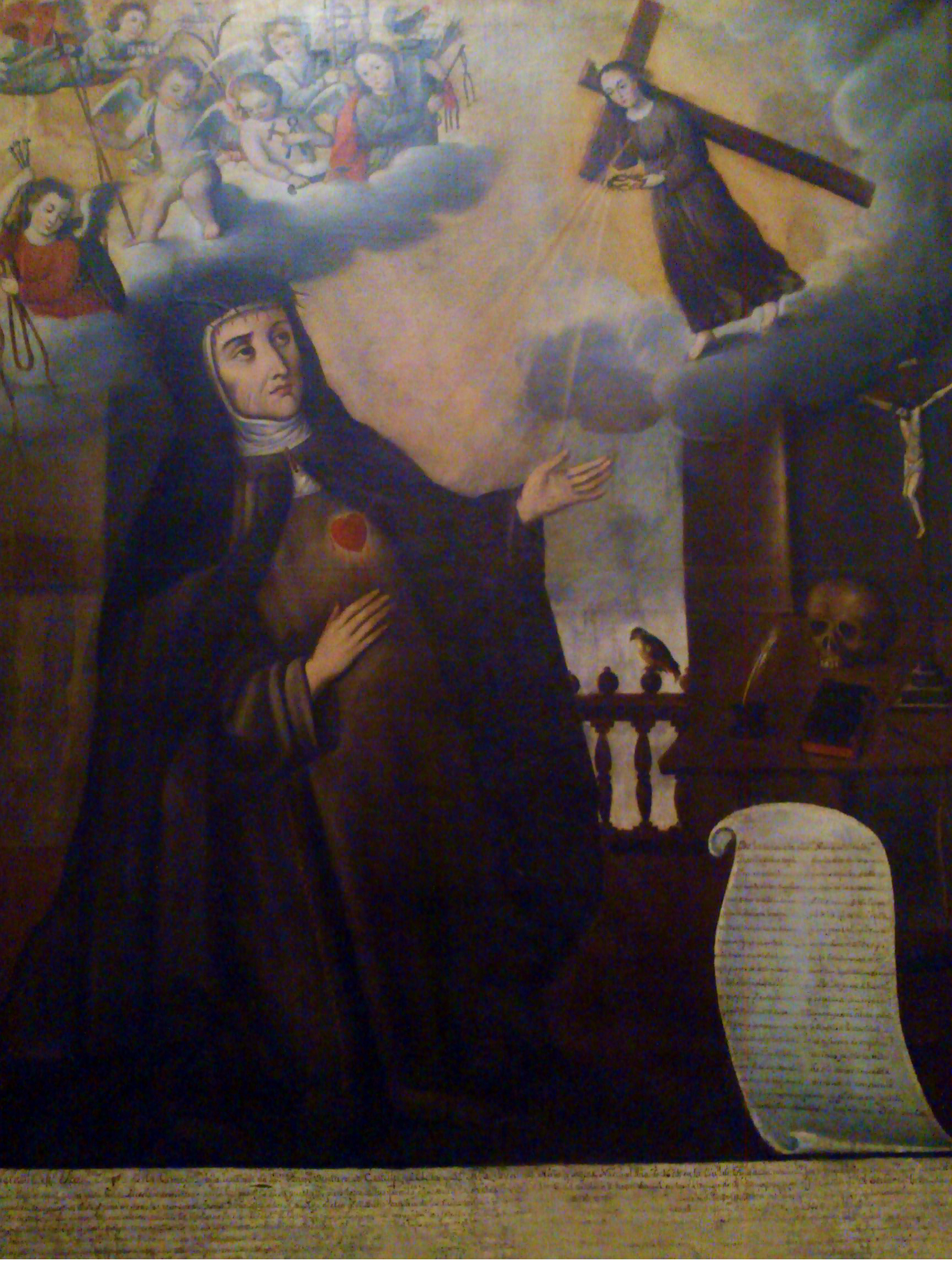
- An allegorical portrait of Sister Josefa del Castillo, c. 1813
- Born: Francisca Josefa de Castillo y Guevara; 6 October 1671; Tunja, New Kingdom of Granada, Spanish Empire
- Died: 1742 (aged 70–71); Tunja, Viceroyalty of New Granada, Spanish Empire
- Occupation: Nun
- Writing career
- Language: Spanish
- Period: 1694—1742
- Subject: Christian mysticism
- Notable work: Afectos espirituales

Francisca Josefa de la Concepción OSC Tunja (1671–1742) was a Spanish Neogranadine nun and mystic in the region of New Kingdom of Granada which later became Colombia. The first recorded woman writer of what now is Colombia, her devotional and autobiographical writings were published posthumously.

Her work has been studied by Dario Achury Valenzuela, Constanza Toquica, Ángela Inés Robledo, Antonio Gómez Restrepo, Elisa Mújica, José María Vergara y Vergara, and Daniel Alejandro Montes, among others, who recognize her as one of the most prominent writers of Neogranadine literature.

== Origins ==
Francisca Josefa de Castillo y Guevara was born into a wealthy family on October 6, 1671, in Tunja, which at the time was part of the New Kingdom of Granada. Her father, Francisco Ventura de CastiIlo y Toledo, an hidalgo colonist originally from Illescas in Spain, was initially appointed General lieutenant of the city and then Mayor. Her mother, María Guevara Niño y Rojas, was a native criolla of Tunja of Basque descent. Francisca Josefa had three siblings whose names were Catalina and Pedro Antonio Diego. Her other sister's name remains unknown.

As a young woman she became a Poor Clare nun at the Royal Monastery of St. Clare, located in her town, where she spent the rest of her life within its walls. She was later appointed abbess of the community three times.

== Religious life ==
At age 18, after facing family opposition, she entered the Convent of Santa Clara la Real, in Tunja; she spent two years as a laywoman and two as a novice. On September 24, 1694, at age 23, became a nun. Around this time, Francisca Josefa bought her own cell, which had a grandstand overlooking the chapel and, on the other side, overlooked an orchard with fruit trees. This cell has now become a tourist destination for those who visit the convent.

Her initial life in the convent was difficult, due to the envy generated by Francisca's outstanding intelligence (despite scarce academic resources, she managed to learn Latin and read the Bible). In 1691 she began her novitiate and three years later she professed the vows of a nun, under the name of Francisca Josefa de la Concepción.

Throughout her life she was influenced by the priests who officiated as her confessors, who encouraged her to write about the mystical feelings she experienced. She carried out all kinds of tasks within her religious community, such as sacristan, midwife, nurse, novice mistress, listener, secretary and on four occasions she was elected abbess (1715, 1718, 1729 and 1738). She also learned to play the organ.

== Selected works ==
- Castillo, Francisca Josefa de la Concepción (1817). Castillo y Alarcon, Antonio María de (ed.). Vida de la V M Francisca Josefa de la Concepción... (autobiography) (in Spanish). Philadelphia: T H Palmer. OCLC 5356222.
- — (1843). Gaitán, Benito (ed.). Sentimientos espirituales de la venerable Madre Francisca Josefa de la Concepción (compilation) (in Spanish). Bogotá: Imprenta de Bruno Espinosa de los Monteros. OCLC 8811302.
- — (1968). Achury Valenzuela, Darío (ed.). Obras completas de la Madre Francisca Josefa de la Concepción (compilation) (in Spanish). Bogotá: Colombia, Bank of the Republic of. OCLC 1199914.

== See also ==
- María Josefa Acevedo Sánchez
- Juan de Castellanos Sánchez
