= Darío Samper =

Colombian poet, journalist and writer (1909–1984)

Darío Samper (1909-1984) was a Colombian poet, journalist and writer. He was born in Guateque in Boyaca province. He was the younger brother of the caricaturist Adolfo Samper. His first book of poems Cuaderno del trópico came out in 1936 when he was part of the literary group Los Bachués. This group was noted for its inclination towards costumbrista poetry of an earthy and indigenous nature. He published Habitante de su imagen and became part of the better known Piedra y Cielo group.

In addition to writing, teaching was a fundamental part of his professional life. He studied law at the Universidad Libre de Bogota, and he was founder and professor at the Universidad Central and rector of the Universidad Distrital. He also served as director of the Unión Liberal magazine and the Diario Nacional newspaper, among many other papers and journals that he was involved with. Like another piedracielista poet Tomas Vargas Osorio, he held public office: he was a Representative to the House and Senator of the Republic. He died in Bogotá on March 15, 1984, after a long illness.

His other works include a biography of the politician José Hilario López.
