= Martha L. Canfield =

Uruguayan author & poet (born 1949)

- Born: Martha Luana Malvino Canfield; May 28, 1949 (age 76) Montevideo, Uruguay
- Occupation: Writer; University professor; Translator; Literary critic; Poet; Hispanist
- Citizenship: Uruguay, Italy
- Education: Universidad de Montevideo; Instituto de Profesores Artigas; Pontificia Universidad Javeriana; Instituto Caro y Cuervo; University of Florence
- Subject: Latin American literature; Spanish; Literary translation; Poetry
- Literary movement: Nameless Generation

Martha L. Canfield (born May 28, 1949) is an Uruguayan and naturalized Italian author, poet, and university professor.

== Biography ==
She was born in Montevideo, Uruguay in 1949. Her father was an officer of the Uruguayan Navy with an Irish background, and her mother was the daughter of immigrants from the Basilicata region of Italy, because of this she speaks Spanish, English, and Italian since childhood. She studied in the Department of Humanities at the Universidad de la República (English: University of the Republic) and in the Instituto de Profesores Artigas (English: Artigas Institute for Teacher Education) in Montevideo. At the same time she frequented literary environments in her home city. At the advice of Professor José Pedro Rona, in 1968, she transferred to Colombia where she graduated in 1971 in Philosophy and Letters from the Pontificia Universidad Javeriana in Bogota and obtained a Master's in Latin American Literature in the Instituto Caro y Cuervo (English: Caro and Cuervo Institute) in the same city. Immediately after she began her instructional activity in the Universidad del Rosario, where she was the first woman to obtain a teaching position.

In 1973, her sister, Susana, settled with her in Bogota after finding out they were being persecuted by the Uruguayan dictatorship. Susana was persecuted because she was considered a fugitive and Martha due to her intellectual contributions to the National Liberation Movement-Tupamaros in various publications, causing her to be on the radar of Uruguayan law enforcement.

In 1974, thanks to a scholarship given by the Italian-Latin American Institute in Rome, she went to Italy to do research in Latin American literature in the University of Florence, originally under the guidance of Giovanni Meo Zilio, who later transferred to Venice, and afterwards under the guidance of new professor, Roberto Paoli. Once her scholarship ended, she returned to Colombia as the Chair of Spanish and Latin American Literature at the Xavierian Pontifical University, during which she maintained a period of intense educational activity, research, and creative writing. She came out with her first book of poems, Anunciaciones, published by the Alcaravan publishing company, founded by Arturo Alape, her friend and fellow writer. The book was well received by critics. Despite this success and other positive factors of her life in Colombia, due to personal reasons, she returned to Italy in February 1977.

She settled back in Florence, resumed her collaboration with Professor Roberto Paoli, was appointed assistant (Assistente di Cattedra), and renewed her professional relationship with the Hispanic scholar, Oreste Macrí, who introduced her to the world of Florentine Hermeticism, beginning a long and affectionate friendship with Mario Luzi and Piero Bigongiari.

In 1980, when the position of university researcher (Ricercatore universitario a tempo indeterminato) was created, she was the perfect candidate and took up the position in Florence. In the 80s, both her poetic and research works intensified and she began to work in the circulation of Latin American literature in Italy through the translation of many author's works, at a lower rate she did the same for the circulation of Italian literature in the Hispanic world. During these years she repeatedly participated in Medellin's International Poem Festival, where she translated and presented Italian poets like Edoardo Sanguineti, Giuliano Scabia, Valerio Magrelli, and more. The directors of the festival name her the Italian advisor.

In 1982, she met Peruvian Jorge Eduardo Eilson, who arrived in Florence with his partner Michele Mulas at the invitation of Roberto Paoli. A strong friendship blossomed between Martha and Jorge, continuing for years and eventually leading to the founding of a Centro de Estudios [Studies Center], taking the name of the Peruvian professor and directed by Canfield.

Through a competition, in 1992 she obtained the position as an associate professor of Latin American Literature at the University of Nápoles Federico II, where she taught for 4 years, integrating herself among the teaching staff headquartered in the University of Palmero. In 1996 she transferred to the Ca' Foscari University in Venice, where she taught for 6 years while organizing the Festival Ca' Foscari Poesia every 2 years, in which many participated including the best Latin American writers and critics: Mario Benedetti (Uruguay), Álvaro Mutis (Colombia), Jorge Enrique Adoum (Ecuador), Gonzalo Rojas (Chile), Blanca Wiethüchter (Bolivia), Saúl Yurkievich (Argentina), Ernesto Cardenal (Nicaragua), Humberto Ak'abal (Guatemala), Eugenio Montejo (Venezuela), Carmen Boullosa (Mexico), José Miguel Oviedo (Peru), William Rowe (UK), and more naturally including Eielson.

During this period she founded the literary Latinoamericana collection for the editorial Le Lettere and participated in the creation of the Premio Letterario Internazionale di Poesia Pier Paolo Pasolini (English: International Pier Paolo Pasolini Literature Award for Poetry) alongside Dacia Maraini and Francesco Agresti. From 1997 until 2000, she was the Vice President of the Associazione Ispanisti Italiani (AISPI) (English: Hispanic Italian Association).

In 2000, she became the head of the Latin American Literature chair at the University of Florence while she continued her educational role in the University Ca' Foscari; after 2002 she concentrated on her Florence work. Since 1998 she has been a member of the Academia Nacional de Letras del Uruguay (English: National Academy of Letters in Uruguay).

== Academic work ==
Her academic work includes research of works by writers: Delmira Agustini, Humberto Ak'abal, Mario Benedetti, Jorge Luis Borges, Julio Cortázar, Sor Juana Inés de la Cruz, Jorge Eduardo Eielson, Gabriel García Márquez, Juan Gelman, Juana de Ibarbourou, Ramón López Velarde, César Moro, Álvaro Mutis, Octavio Paz, Horacio Quiroga, José Enrique Rodó, Mauricio Rosencof, Juan Rulfo, Alfonsina Storni, César Vallejo, Mario Vargas Llosa, Emilio Adolfo Westphalen, and many more. Besides stylistic and structural studies, she has continuously made an effort to establish the relationship between life and literary work while using tools from Jungian psychology. For the same reason she has participated in the group Klaros, directed by Ida Regina Zoccoli, and has collaborated with the ”Quaderni di psicologia analitica”. In 2015, she was given the Ibero-American Ramón López Velarde Prize for her general critical work and in particular for her book La provincia inmutable. Estudios sobre la poesía de Ramón López Velarde, published in Florence in 1981 and reedited in Mexico after the awarding.

As a translator, she has created the Italian editions of many Latin American authors such as: Jorge Eduardo Eielson, Álvaro Mutis, Idea Vilariño, Mario Vargas Llosa, Carlos Germán Belli, Márgara Russotto, Carmen Boullosa, Alejandro Rossi, Darío Jaramillo, Ernesto Cardenal, Jorge Arbeleche, and others. In 2002, she won the translation award from the Institutos Cervantes in Italy for her Italian versions of Mario Benedetti (Inventario. Poesie 1948-2000 (in Italian). Firenze: Le Lettere. 2001. ISBN 8871665775.)

Furthermore, she has promoted Italian literature in the Hispanic world with her translations of Gesualdo Bufalino, Pier Paolo Pasolini, Valerio Magrelli, Dacia Maraini, Edoardo Sanguineti, Piero Bigongiari, Mario Luzi, and others. In 2001 she won the “Circe-Sabaudia” Award precisely for those translations of Italian poets.

She directed the Latinoamericana collection in the Florence editorial Le Lettere in which 30 volumes (narratives, poems, and essays) have been published, of which some 20 have been presented or curated by her directly.

She has upheld the existence of a unique Latin American identity, beyond national divisions and local differences. She maintains that the study of Hispanic American culture must maintain a continental perspective, paying attention to pre-Columbian roots and indigenous nations, as well as more recent, innovative, and multicultural phenomena, such as Chicano literature or that of Latino communities in the United States or the neo-Indian formulations in many countries like Mexico, Guatemala, Colombia, Peru, Chile... With these principles in mind, she is working on Literatura hispanoamericana: historia y antología, in three volumes, the first of which has already been published.

Her critical works often highlight the link between the author's life and their work on the basis of analytical readings, a link that she has defined as a germinal source, although by no means mechanical, and often indirect or even paradoxical. Canfield believes that identifying this link can be enlightening for understanding both the specific work and the very mechanisms of literary creation. This point of view has often led her to establish personal relationships with the authors she studies, which in several cases have resulted in deep and lasting friendships—as has been the case with Jorge Enrique Adoum, Mario Benedetti, Juan Gelman, Álvaro Mutis, Mauricio Rosencof, and Mario Vargas Llosa—or even fraternal bonds, such as with Márgara Russotto and Carmen Boullosa, or very special ones like with Jorge Eduardo Eielson.

== Friendship with Jorge Eduardo Eielson ==
In 1982, she met Jorge Eduardo Eielson in Florence with who she immediately had a highly intellectual and person-to-person bond. She was the first translator of his poems in Italian and after a set of articles and interviews, she published the anthology Poesia scritta. This intellectual bond was strengthened thanks to constant communication based on their professions. Canfield frequently recounts that Eielson was always the first to read her unedited works. These conversations generated various published interviews in both Italian and Latin American magazines, which later were collected in the volume El diálogo infinito.

There are also many compositions that were dedicated to one another, as well as books and articles that they collaborated on or published together. However, the most important part of this relationship was the personal bond they had, which turned a friendly work relationship into an almost familial bond in the harsh final years of the Peruvian author's life after the death of his partner and artist: Michele Mulas. Due to this passing, in 2002 Eielson was left alone but with the support of Martha, especially in his last year of life in which he was gravely ill. Due to this bond and the trust had between the two, Eielson made the decision to make her heir of all he had. She accepted this and promised to found a cultural association with his name dedicated to promoting, above all, his and Michele's artistic and literary work as well as Latin American culture.

Jorge Eduardo Eielson died on March 8, 2006 and Centro Studi Jorge Eielson is founded September of the same year, of which Martha Canfield is the president alongside vice president Aldo Tagliaferri and second vice president Antonella Ciabatti; the scientific committee, in which many Latin American and Italian intellectuals participate in, is led by Mario Vargas Llosa.

The Center's first notable event was an anthological exhibition over Eielson's artistic work, titled “Arte come nodo/nodo come dono” held in the Sala de Armas of Palazzo Vecchio in Florencia and lasted from November 2008 until January 2009. The exhibition was inaugurated by Mario Vargas Llosa who, soon after in 2010, was awarded Nobel Prize in Literature.

The exhibition was the first of many, of which another 3 were dedicated to Eielson alongside national and international congresses and publications with the Center's seal, which in the meantime has created an editorial.

== Poetry ==
Martha Canfield began writing poems in her teenage years, which later was circled among fellow young poets such as Jorge Arbeleche in Montevideo. But the fundamental phase for her work was back in Colombia: during the years she lived in Bogota, she participated in gatherings held in Cafetería La Romana on Avenida Jiménez and gained connections with well-known writers such as: Aurelio Arturo, Giovanni Quessep, Mario Rivero, along with other young writers who became good friends including: Juan Gustavo Cobo Borda, Augusto Pinilla, Jaime García Maffla, Darío Jaramillo, who all, including her, belonged to the [Nameless Generation] Generación sin nombre. Thanks to her connections with those writers, her literary work improved and in 1972 her first poems were published in the “Eco” magazine of Bogota; soon after Cobo Borda included her as a transgressor among young Colombian writers in his anthological story “Obra en marcha”. Her first book of poems, Anunciaciones, was published in 1976 by Alcaraván, the editorial founded and directed by her friend Arturo Alape.

Her later move to Italy and increased contact with Florentine hermeticism enriched her poetic work. Through refined, fluid, luminous and lyrical language, Martha Canfield's poems have main themes of love (erotic, fraternal, and mystical), nostalgia, mythology and its connection to tradition, desire, religion, and the contrast between dreams and reality where material meets with the spiritual and transcends the limit of what is physically possible to seek out the sublime. For Armando Romero, her poetry "resonates from what’s intimate of an existence that doesn’t look to alter things but rather to recognize and identify with its existence the very act of poetry” through “crystal-like sensibility and extreme intelligence”, which Márgara Russotto defines as a “enteral maidenliness of the soul”.

There isn’t a lack of political and social references, especially in her first production phase, that coincide with the pain held due to the political situation in Uruguay and the nostalgia that’s generated though geographical evocations of her abandoned birth country; evocations that will later begin referencing Colombian passages to soon after, in almost absolute manner after the 80s, will shift to Tuscan settings. It is precisely this memory of settings that is another fundamental aspect of her poetry, in which the contemplated passages are staged of her memory's internal itinerary. Gaetano Chiappini sees in this evocation of settings a true passage that coincides with existential maturity. Álvaro Mutis highlights Martha's language as “clean and clear, it disposes of all literary artificialness giving space to metaphor only when it goes beyond simple verbal enunciation.”

She has published 11 poem collections, six in Spanish and 5 in Italian along with three anthologies. She is present in Italian, Colombian, and Uruguayan anthologies by different authors. Her poetic word has been partially translated in English, French, Romanian, and Hebrew.

She has received many awards such as the Special Poetry Prize from the Italian Association “La Cultura del Mare” [The Culture of the Sea] in 2000 and the Orient-Occident through the Arts award from the international festival “Noches de Poesía” [Poetry Nights] during its 10th edition at Curtea de Arges, Romania, in 2006. In 2016 she was published in the anthology “Il fiore della poesia latinoamericana d'oggi (Secondo Volume: America meridionale – I)”.

== Works ==
=== Academic work ===
Among her studies and essays, the following are included:

- La provincia inmutable. Estudios sobre la poesía de Ramón López Velarde. Firenze: D’Anna. 1981. Consultado el 17 de junio de 2017.; La provincia inmutable. Estudios sobre la poesía de Ramón López Velarde. Fernando Fernández (prólogo), Carmen Boullosa (contraportada) (2 edición). México: La Otra-Instituto Zacatecano de Cultura. 2015. ISBN 978-607-8167-46-3
- El "patriarca" de García Márquez, arquetipo literario del dictador hispanoamericano. Firenze: Opus Libri. 1984. ISBN 978-88-8116-148-5
- Configuración del arquetipo. Firenze: Opus Libri. 1988.
- El diálogo infinito: una conversación con Jorge Eduardo Eielson. México: Colección Poesía y poética, Universidad Iberoamericana/Artes de México. 1995. ISBN 978-968-6533-31-6; El diálogo infinito: una conversación con Jorge Eduardo Eielson (2 ampliada edición). Sevilla: Sibila - Fundación BBVA. 2011. ISBN 978-84-92705-16-0
- Literatura hispanoamericana: historia y antología. Milan: Hoepli. 2009. ISBN 9788820336813.

=== Poetry ===
- Anunciaciones. Bogotá: Alcaraván. 1976.; Anunciaciones (2 edición). Copenhague: Aurora Boreal. 2015. ISBN 978-87-998568-7-9
- Nero cuore dell'alba (en italiano). Salerno: Multimedia. 1988. ISBN 978-88-86203-27-2
- Mar/Mare (en italiano/español). Roldanillo: Ediciones Embalaje del Museo Omar Rayo. 1989.
- El viaje de Orfeo. Montevideo: Signos. 1990.
- Caza de altura. Poemas 1968-1993. Bogotá: Instituto Caro y Cuervo. 1994.
- Orillas como mares. Bogotá: El Malpensante - Ediciones de la Universidad Externado de Colombia. 2004. ISBN 978-958-616-921-9 Archivado desde el original el 2 de febrero de 2017. Consultado el 17 de junio de 2017.
- Capriccio di un colore (en italiano). Firenze: Le Lettere. 2004. ISBN 978-88-7166-690-7
- Per abissi d'amore (in Italian). Como: LietoColle. 2006. ISBN 8878482374.
- PEl cuerpo de los sueños. Lima: Lustra. 2008. ISBN 978-603-45291-4-4.
- Corazón abismo. Bogotá: Universidad Javeriana. 2012. ISBN 978-958-716-472-5; Corazón abismo (2 edición). México: La Otra - Colección “Temblor de Cielo”. 2013. ISBN 978-607-8167-19-7
- Luna di giorno (in Italian). Como: LietoColle / pordenonelegge.it. 2017. ISBN 9788893820332.

In addition to two of her poetic anthologies: Márgara Russotto, ed. (2011). Sonriendo en el camino. Poesía reunida (2009-1969). Montevideo: Linardi y Risso. ISBN 978-9974-675-43-8. y Coral García, ed. (2012). Flamante geografía. Lima: Editorial Nido de cuervos.

Referenced and present in many anthologies: Rafael Courtoisie, ed. (2011). La poesía del siglo XX en Uruguay. Madrid: Visor. pp. 323-331. ISBN 978-9974-675-43-8. y Emilio Coco, ed. (2016). Il fiore della poesia latinoamericana oggi (en italiano). 3 - America meridionale. Rimini: Raffaelli. ISBN 978-9974-675-43-8; additionally, the sub-voce in Miguel Ángel Campodónico, ed. (2007). Nuevo diccionario de la cultura uruguaya. Montevideo: Linardi y Risso. p. 69.

== Awards ==
- Premio Speciale di Poesia dell’Associazione Italiana «La Cultura del Mare», Italia, 2000.
- Premio de traducción «Circe-Sabaudia», Italia, 2001.
- Premio de traducción Institutos Cervantes de Italia, 2002.
- Premio Oriente-Occidente, Festival Internacional «Noches de Poesía», Curtea de Arges, Romania, 2006.
- Premio Iberoamericano Ramón López Velarde, México, 2015.
- IX Riconoscimento Alberto Caramella, Florencia, 2017.

== See also ==
- Jorge Eduardo Eielson
- Mario Benedetti
- Álvaro Mutis
- Mario Vargas Llosa

== Bibliography ==
- Chiappini, Gaetano (1994). "Cómo cierto eco no se pierde". In Canfield, Martha (ed.). Caza de altura. Poemas 1968-1993. Bogotá: Instituto Caro y Cuervo. pp. 13–22.
- Chiappini, Gaetano (2015). "La poesía de Martha L. Canfield". In Canfield, Martha (ed.). Anunciaciones (2nd ed.). Copenhagen: Aurora Boreal. pp. 17–18. ISBN 978-87-998568-7-9.
- Coppola, Bruno (1988). "Canto i semi rossi di melograno". In Canfield, Martha (ed.). Nero cuore dell'alba (in Italian). Salerno: Multimedia. pp. 75–83. ISBN 8886203276.
- Courtoisie, Rafael, ed. (2011). La poesía del siglo XX en Uruguay. Madrid: Visor. pp. 323–331. ISBN 978-9974-675-43-8.
- Coral García, «La poesía monolingüe de una poetisa bilingüe» (pp. 5-24) y «Creación y traducción en sintonía» (pp. 135-149), en Canfield, Martha (2012). Coral García, ed. Flamante geografía. Lima: Editorial Nido de cuervos.
- Álvaro Mutis, contraportada, en Canfield, Martha (2004). Orillas como mares. Bogotá: El Malpensante - Ediciones de la Universidad Externado de Colombia. ISBN 978-958-616-921-9
- Juana Rosa Pita, «El corazón es la caracola olvidada», en Canfield, Martha (2013). Corazón abismo (2 edición). México: La Otra - Colección “Temblor de Cielo”. pp. 9-11. ISBN 978-607-8167-19-7
- Silvio Ramat, «Nella tradizione del moderno», en Canfield, Martha (2004). Capriccio di un colore (en italiano). Firenze: Le Lettere. pp. 7-9. ISBN 978-88-7166-690-7
- Paolo Ruffilli, «Poesia Verticale», en Canfield, Martha (2004). Capriccio di un colore (en italiano). Firenze: Le Lettere. pp. 10-11. ISBN 978-88-7166-690-7
- Romero, Armando (2008). "Detrás de la imagen: la poesía de Martha Canfield". In Canfield, Martha (ed.). El cuerpo de los sueños. Lima: Lustra. pp. 5–8. ISBN 978-603-45291-4-4.
- Márgara Russotto, «La doncellez del alma: Memoria y ékfrasis en la poesía de Martha Canfield» (pp. 7-22) y «Poesía y tradición: Entrevista a Martha Canfield» (pp. 197-245), en Canfield, Martha (2011). Márgara Russotto, ed. Sonriendo en el camino. Poesía reunida (2009-1969). Montevideo: Linardi y Risso. ISBN 978-9974-675-43-8
