= Alfonso Carvajal =

Alfonso Carvajal may refer to:

- Alfonso Carvajal (actor), Filipino actor
- Alfonso Carvajal (writer) (born 1958), Colombian writer and editor
