= Carlos Martín =

Carlos Martín may refer to:

- Carlos Martín Briceño (born 1966), Mexican writer
- Carlos Martín Urriza (born 1968), Spanish politician
- Carlos Martín (footballer) (born 2002), Spanish footballer
- Carlos Martín (poet) (1914–2008), Colombian poet

== See also ==
- Carlos Martins (disambiguation)
