= Alfonso Carvajal (writer) =

Colombian writer (born 1958)

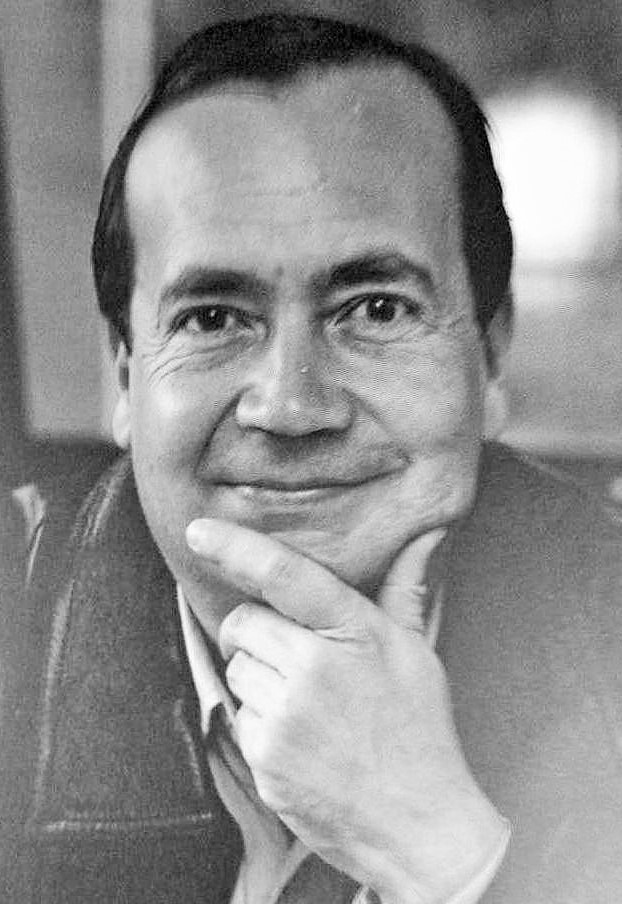
Image of Alfonso Carvajal

Alfonso Carvajal (born 1958; Cartagena, Colombia) is a writer and editor.

== Works ==
- El desencanto de la eternidad
- Memoria de la noche
- Un minuto de silencio
- Los poetas malditos, un ensayo libre de culpa

He also reviews books in the newspaper El Tiempo. As an editor, he has published works by Aurelio Arturo, Germán Espinosa and Rafael Gutiérrez Girardot, among others.

== Bibliography ==
- El desencanto de la eternidad, Memoria de la noche y Un minuto de silencio y Los poetas malditos, un ensayo libre de culpa.
- Analisis De Ana Karenina, Panamericana Pub Llc, ISBN 978-958-30-1221-1
