= Elisa Mújica =

Colombian writer (1918–2003)

- Born: Elisa Mújica Velásquez; 21 January 1918; Bucaramanga, Colombia
- Died: 27 March 2003 (aged 85); Bogotá, Colombia
- Occupations: Writer, poet
- Writing career
- Language: Spanish
- Genres: Novel, short story

Elisa Mújica Velásquez (21 January, 1918 – 27 March, 2003) was a Colombian writer. She published novels, short stories, essays, books for children as well as interviews, book reviews and columns for local newspapers El Tiempo and El Espectador. She was a member of the Academia Colombiana de la Lengua and the Real Academia Española. In 2018, the award Premio Nacional de Narrativa Elisa Mújica was created in order to recognize the work of unpublished female authors and to honor her 100th birth anniversary.

== Career ==
She worked as an assistant at the Ministry of Communications. Later, between 1936 and 1943, she worked as the personal secretary of future President of Colombia Carlos Lleras Restrepo. During these days, she was close to the Grupo Bachué, one of the most important artistic avant-garde movements in Colombia. Later, she worked at the Quito Embassy between 1943 and 1945. She published her novel Los dos tiempos in 1949. She lived in Spain in the 1950s and was an influence to her niece, the poet and journalist María Mercedes Carranza. In Ecuador she had met members from El grupo de Guayaquil and become a supporter of marxism and communism. However, she was also interested in figures such as Sor Teresa de Jesús and Sor Francisca Josefa del Castillo. In 1964 she wrote the essay La aventura demorada. Ensayo sobre santa Teresa de Jesús. She also received a special recognition by the Premio Esso for her novel Catalina in 1962. In the 1980s, Mújica was a member of the Academia Colombiana de la Lengua and the Real Academia Española.

== Published works ==
=== Novels ===
- Los dos tiempos, 1949
- Catalina, 1963
- Bogotá de las nubes, 1984

=== Essays ===
- El Indio en América: síntesis de obras americanas sobre el problema indígena, 1948
- La aventura demorada: ensayo sobre santa Teresa de Jesús, 1951
- La Candelaria, 1974
- Introducción a Santa Teresa, 1981
- Las altas torres del humo: raíces del cuento popular en Colombia, 1985
- Sor Francisca Josefa de Castillo, 1991

=== Short stories ===
- Ángela y el diablo, 1953
- Árbol de ruedas, 1972
  - "Prólogo"; "La Montaña"; "Las reclusas"; "La biblioteca"; "La acacia"; "El visitante"; "El espejo y el rubí"; "El aeropuerto"; "La palmera"; "La perla"; "El documento"; "La silla giratoria"; "El retrato"
- La tienda de las imágenes, 1987
- Cuentos, 2009

=== Children's literature ===
- La Expedición Botánica contada a los niños, 1978
- Bestiario, 1980
- Pequeño Bestiario, 1990
- Las casas que hablan: guía histórica del barrio de la Candelaria de Santa Fé de Bogotá, 1994
- Cuentos para niños de La Candelaria, 1997

=== Autobiography ===
- Diario: 1968–1971, 2008

=== Criticism ===
- Reminiscencias de Santafé de Bogotá, de José María Cordovez Moure, Aguilar, 1957

== Awards and recognition ==
- "Tribute of admiration" from the jury of the 1962 Esso Literature Prize, for her novel Catalina
