= Winston Morales =

Colombian poet, novelist and journalist (born 1969)

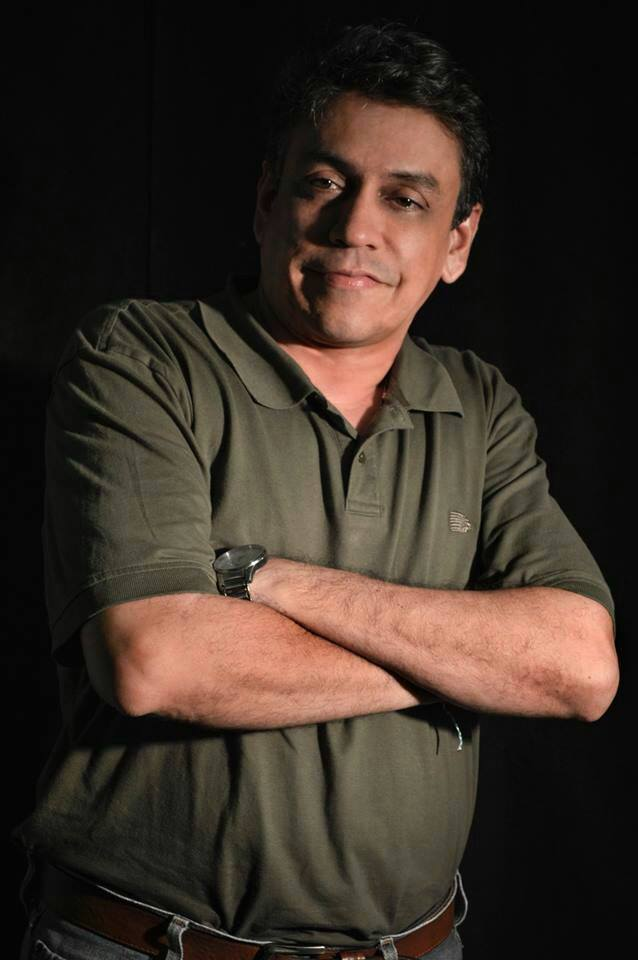
Winston Morales Chavarro

Winston Morales Chavarro is a Colombian poet, novelist and journalist born in Neiva, in 1969. He has a master's degree in Latin American Literature from the Simon Bolivar Andean University in Quito. He is now a full-time professor teaching at the University of Cartagena. His poetry explores the history of mythology and the mystery of life. In his writing he seeks to analyse some of the most poets of the twentieth century in Latin America, including José Antonio Ramos Sucre, Carlos Obregon, César Dávila Andrade and Jaime Sáenz. His texts have been partially translated into French, Italian, English, Polish, German, Rumanian and Chinese included in different national and foreign anthologies.

He has given lectures and lectures at the Universities of Antioquia, Surcolombiana and Cartagena (Colombia); Szczecin, Krakow, Warsaw, Wroclaw, Zielona Gora and Poznan (Poland); Harvard, California, Salem, Merrimack and Northern Essex Community College (United States); Sonora (Mexico), and Granada (Spain).

== Published work ==
Poetry

- "Aniquirona", band of poetry, published by Trilce, Bogotá, Colombia, 1998
- "The Rain and the Angel", three poets from Huila, Neiva (In collaboration with Jáder Rivera Monje y Esmir Garcés Quiacha) poetry book, publisher Tricle, 1999
- "Back to Schuaima", published by Dauro, Granada, Spain, 2001
- "Memoirs of Alexander de Brucco", publisher University of Antioquia, Medellín, Colombia, 2002
- "Poetic entirety", personal collection of poems, publisher Altazor, Bogotá, Colombia, 2005
- "Collection", poetry collection, National University, Bogotá, Colombia, 2009
- "Road to Rogitama", band of poetry, publisher Trilce, Neiva, Colombia, 2010
- "The city of stones that sing", Book Hunting, Ibague, Colombia, 2011
- "Time was time", band of poetry, (Poems in French), publisher Altazor, Bogotá, Colombia, 2013
- "The sweet Aniquirona", Communicators University of Cartagena, Cartagena de Indias, Colombia, 2015
- "Where do the elapsed days go?", University of La Sabana, Bogotá, Colombia, 2016
- "Encrypted lamp", International Academy Orient-Occident of Arges-Romania, Romania 2018
- "The flight of the blue birds", Poetry, Edition, 2018

Novels

- "God put a smile on his face", 2004

Essays

- "Poetics of the Occult" in the writings of José Antonio Ramos Sucre, Carlos Obregón, César Dávila Andrade and Jaime Sáenz, publishers Trilce, Bogotá, Colombia, 2008
- "The beautiful awakens and other texts", publisher New People, Bogotá, Colombia, 2015
- "Tasks of Acoustics", Typeface dynamics at the University of Cartagena, publisher University of Cartagena, Cartagena de Indias, Colombia 1980 - 2009
- "Transits and persistence of the everyday: Hermeneutical approach to the lyrical and journalistic work of Jorge García Usta", publisher University of Cartagena, Cartagena de Indias, Colombia 2020

Translations

- "La douce Aniquirone et D`autres poemes somme poètique", (French translation by Marcel Kemadjou Njanke), 2013
- "Słodka Aniquirona", (Polish translation by Barbara Stawicka -Pirecka), Event at the University Adam Mickiewicz, Poland, 2017
- "Die süße Aniquirona", (German translation by Jeannette Vidoni), Communicators of the University of Cartagena, Cartagena de Indias, Colombia, 2018
- "Lumină criptată", (Romanian translation by Valeria Dumitru), International Academy Orient-Occident of Arges-Romania, Romania 2018
- "The sweet Aniquirona" (English translation by Luis Rafael Gálvez), 2019
- "日子流逝何方？" (Mandarin translation by Lee Kuei-shien, 2020

== Awards and honors ==
- First place in the House of Poetry, Organization Competition, Neiva, Colombia, 1996
- First place in the poetry competition José Eustasio Rivera, Colombia, 1997 and 1999
- First place in the competition department of the Ministry of Culture, Colombia, 1998
- First Place of the National Poetry Competition "Euclides Jaramillo Arango", University of Quindío, Colombia, 2000
- Second Place of the National Poetry Competition of the City of Chiquinquirá, Colombia, 2000
- First Place of the National Poetry Competition of the University of Antioquia, Medellín, Colombia, 2001
- Third place of the International Literary Competition of Outono, Brazil
- First place at the IX. National Biennial of Roman José Eustasio Rivera with the novel "God has a smile on his face", 2004
- Finalist of the Young Talent Award "The Fungible" Council of Alcobendas, Spain, 2005
- First place of the National Poetry Competition of the Bolivar Technological University, Cartagena, Cartagena de Indias, Colombia 2005
- Winner with his project "Parallels of the Invisible" of the artistic residence of the Colombian Ministry of Culture and the Foncas of México, 2005
- Winner of the Poetry Competition of the Institute of Cultural Heritage of Cartagena, Cartagena de Indias, Colombia, 2013
- Winners of the History Competition Humberto Tafur Charry, 2013
- Invitation to the III. World Congress of Spanish-American Poets, Los Angeles, California, America, 2014
- First place at the Genaro Diáz Jordán competition, 2016 International Poetry Award "David Mejía Velilla", University of La Sabana, Bogotá, Colombia, 2014
- Honored as a writer on the XII. International Book Fair of Lawrence, Massachusetts, America, 2017
- Award of Senators and State Chamber of Commerce representatives of Massachusetts, America, 2017
- Award from the Office of the Mayor of Boston on the XII. International Book Fair of Lawrence, Massachusetts, America, 2017
- Award of the Order "Gustavo Hernández Riveros" in Neiva, Colombia, 2018
- Excellence Award 2018 of the Journalist Community of Huila in Neiva, Colombia, 2018
- First International Prize for Poetry at the International Poetry festival in Arges-Romania, 2018
- Award of the Order "Cacique Timanco" in Huila, Colombia, 2018
