= Mary Grueso =

Colombian writer and academic (born 1947)

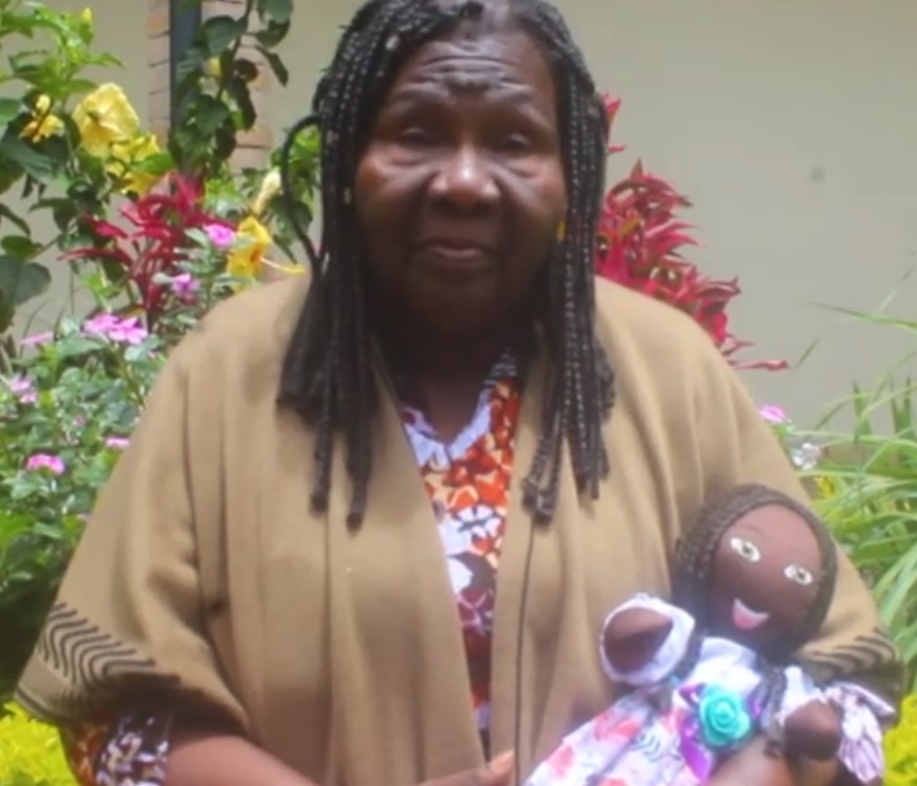
- In a University of Cauca video in 2023
- Born: Mary Grueso Romero; 16 April 1947 (age 79); Chuare Napi, Guapi, Colombia
- Education: University of Quindío; University of Valle
- Occupations: Writer, storyteller, academic

Mary Grueso Romero (born 16 April 1947) is a Colombian writer, oral storyteller and academic. In 2025 she became the first Afro-Colombian woman to be appointed member of the Colombian Academy of Language.

== Career ==
Grueso was born on 16 April 1947 in Chuare Napi village, Guapi, Cauca Department, Colombia, known for being an afro enclave with a long history of music and oral storytelling. She got interested in poetry while studying at school.

At the age of 28, she began her training as a teacher, registration that was facilitated by her husband, who was a mathematics and physics teacher, and graduated with a degree in Spanish and literature from the University of Quindío, where she specialised in Teaching Literature, and a postgraduate degree in children's literature from the University of Valle. She worked as a teacher for more than thirty years and in 2010 Grueso was recognised as the best teacher in Valle del Cauca thanks to her project using literature to empower Afro-Colombian students.

She began writing after the death of her husband in her 30s, which caused her to suffer from severe insomnia. While working as a teacher Grueso also wrote children's stories, whose protagonists and narratives were typical of the Afro-Colombian culture of the Pacific coast of Colombia. Her style is characterised by an oral rhythm and musicality of language, with the use of Afro-Colombian expressions, the recovery of ancestral knowledge from communities in a natural setting, and recurring themes such as black women, community and song. She has also participated in national and international festivals as an oral storyteller. Her children's book La muñeca negra (transl. The Black Doll) became her main bestseller.

Grueso was sworn in as member of the Colombian Academy of Language on 11 July 2025 as the first Afro-Colombian woman.

== Books ==
- El otro yo que sí soy yo (transl. The other me that is really me)
- Del baúl de la abuela (transl. From Grandmother's Trunk)
- El mar y tú (transl. The Sea and You)
- Cuentos al calor de la luna (transl. Tales in the Moonlight)
- Mi gente. Poemas afrocolombianos (transl. My People. Afro-Colombian Poems)
- A golpe de tambor y marimba (transl. To the Beat of the Drum and Marimba)
- Agüela se fue la nuna
- El gran susto de Petronila (transl. Petronila's Big Scare)
- Entre panela y confite (transl. Between Panela and Candy)
- La cucarachita Mandinga (transl. The Little Mandinga Cockroach)
- La muñeca negra (transl. The Black Doll)
- La niña en el espejo (transl. The Girl in the Mirror)
