= Carlos Martín (poet) =

Carlos Martín (1914-2008) was a Colombian poet. He was born in Chiquinquirá, Boyacá. He studied law at the Pontificia Universidad Javeriana, and practiced as a lawyer at the Ministry of Culture and at Shell Oil.

A member of the piedracielismo movement, he published his book Territorio amoroso in 1939. He was active in a variety of genres: poetry, literary criticism, and translations from French. He worked for the magazines Sábado and Altiplano, and later was rector of the Liceo Nacional de Varones de Zipaquirá, the school where Gabriel García Márquez studied. In his memoir, Vivir para contarla, Garcia Marquez speaks positively of Martin's leadership of the school.

In 1961 Martin went to live in the Netherlands, to teach Spanish-American literature at the University of Utrecht. Despite living far away, he was always aware of the literary scene in Colombia, since he ran a literary show on Radio Nederland, and acted as a correspondent for the Colombian Academy of Language. He also wrote a book of poems, Epitafio sobre Piedra y Cielo y otros poemas, a reflection on his time as a piedracielista and his associations with friends and colleagues.

He was the last of the group to die, on December 13, 2008, in Tarragona, Spain.

== Works ==
- Territorio amoroso (1939)
- Es la hora (Madrid, 1973)
- Epitafio de Piedra y Cielo y otros poemas (1984)
- Hacia el último asombro (1991)
- Hispanoamérica, mito y surrealismo (1986).
