= Aurelio Arturo =

Aurelio Arturo Martínez (1906–1974) was a Colombian poet, translator, teacher and lawyer. Although his poetic output is limited to seventy-odd poems, he is considered one of the most important Colombian poets of the twentieth century.

He was born in La Unión in the southern province of Nariño. He was the first of seven children born to Heriberto Arturo Martínez and Raquel Martínez Caicedo. He studied law at university and pursued literature at the same time. He published poetry under multiple pseudonyms in various newspapers and magazines, for example, El Espectador, Golpe de dados, El Tiempo, Eco and El País. As early as 1928, his work was published by German Arciniegas. He became better known in 1931 with the publication of three poems in Crónica Literaria, the Sunday supplement of El País de Cali, then run by Rafael Maya. The Cronica was known for promoting the work of the piedracielismo generation, though Arturo wrote in a different mode from the piedracielistas. He was known as a poet with his own style who pursued his own artistic path.

He did count piedracielistas among his friends, such as the Santander poet Tomás Vargas Osorio whose death in 1941 affected him badly. That same year Arturo married María Esther Lucio, with whom he had five children. He wrote his supreme work Morada al Sur, first published in 1945 in the Revista Universidad Nacional de Colombia. This was also the title of his only book published in 1963, a short intense collection that consisted of fourteen poems. It won the Guillermo Valencia National Poetry Prize that same year.

As a lawyer and civil servant, he served in senior positions at various institutions, including the Colombian Embassy in the United States, and the University of Nariño. He founded and directed the literary radio-magazine Voces del Mundo. He suffered a series of health scares in the early 70s, leading to his death in 1974 in Bogotá.
