= Stone and Sky (movement) =

Colombian literary movement

Stone and sky (Spanish: Piedra y cielo) was a Colombian avant-garde literary movement that set out to renew Colombian poetry in the 1930s and 1940s. Members of this literary movement were often called piedracielistas.

Succeeding the Los Nuevos (the new ones) movement of the 1920s, the group came together in 1935 around the periodical Piedra y Cielo (stone and sky). The phrase was taken from the title of a 1919 poetry book by Juan Ramón Jiménez and represented, for this group, equilibrium. The group defined itself as against the traditionalism and artificial language of previous Colombian poetry, singling out Guillermo Valencia for criticism. Instead, they admired the Spanish poets of the 1920s, such as García Lorca, Hispanic Americans such as Pablo Neruda, and influential lyric poets such as Paul Valéry, Rainer Maria Rilke and T.S. Eliot.

The group had no formal manifesto. Characteristics of their poetry included hypersensitivity, emotion and rejection of canonical forms.

Key members of the group included Jorge Rojas, who inspired it, Eduardo Carranza, who promoted the group, and Arturo Camacho Ramírez.

Juan Lozano y Lozano was a prominent critic of the movement.

== Authors ==
- Eduardo Carranza
- Jorge Rojas
- Arturo Camacho Ramírez
- Gerardo Valencia
- Carlos Martín
- Tomás Vargas Osorio
- Darío Samper
- Meira Delmar

== Notable works ==
Organized as an editorial, the authors who formed a part of this literary movement published their works in journals, including the following:

- La ciudad sumergida, Jorge Rojas (1911–1995)
- Territorio amoroso, Carlos Martín (1914- 2008)
- Presagio de amor, Arturo Camacho Ramírez (1910–1982)
- Seis elegías y un himno, Eduardo Carranza (1913–1985)
- Regreso de la muerte, Tomás Vargas Osorio (1908–1941)
- El ángel desalado, Gerardo Valencia (1911–1994)
- Habitante de su imagen, Darío Samper (1909–1984)

== See also ==
- Nadaism
- Colombian literature
- Latin American Boom
