= Garzón, Huila =

Coordinates: 2°10′55″N 75°39′28″W

Garzón (Colombia)
- Municipality and town
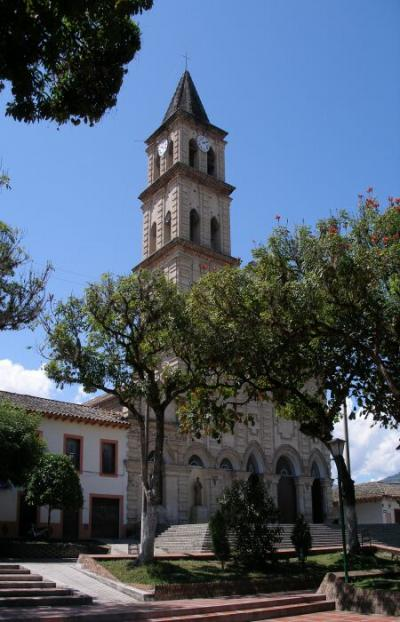
- Garzon Cathedral

- Flag Coat of arms

- Location of the municipality and town of Garzón (Colombia) in the Huila Department of Colombia.
- Country: Colombia
- Department: Huila Department

Area
  - Municipality and town: 606.5 km^{2} (234.2 sq mi)
  - Urban: 5.22 km^{2} (2.02 sq mi)
- Elevation: 828 m (2,717 ft)

Population (2020 est.)
  - Municipality and town: 102,562
  - Density: 169.1/km^{2} (438.0/sq mi)
  - Urban: 60,980
  - Urban density: 11,700/km^{2} (30,300/sq mi)
- Time zone: UTC-5 (Colombia Standard Time)
- Website: http://garzon-huila.gov.co

Garzon (Spanish pronunciation: [ɡaɾˈson]) is a town and municipality in the Huila Department, Colombia.

Garzon is a municipality located in the center of the Colombian department of Huila, about 450 kilometers south of Bogotá and 91 kilometers south of the departmental capital, Neiva. Known as the Diocesan Capital of Huila, it is the first Catholic diocese in the region. Proud of its religious architecture and culture, Garzón is also called "the Soul of Huila." It is known for being one of the cities in the world and inside Huila where the best coffee in the world is grown and processed. This has led to the actor Hugh Jackman and his partner David Steingard to buying the coffee in Garzón for his company, foundation and coffee shop in New York called Laughing Man Foundation.

== History ==
The town's first beginnings were c. 1775 on lands donated by Don Vicente Manrique de Lara. In 1783, the hamlet known as "Garzoncito" was officially founded. On January 1, 1788, it was granted the status of municipality and in 1810 received the title of Villa. On May 19, 1825, the town was decreed head of the Canton of Timaná; it later became the capital of the southern province of Colima.

The place where town is located has been known since remote times with the name of "Garzoncito" but once the municipality was erected the diminutive was suppressed, remaining as it is known today. Historians explain that its name is also due to the fact that at the time when the Spanish took possession of these lands, an animal, a huge heron species called Garzón appeared, according to the ancients. This animal was extremely aggressive, it was seen for some time and then it disappeared; the settlers called it the great heron and the river where this animal appeared was suppressed the name of Tocheré by that of Garzón.

The painter and poet Yesid Morales Ramírez is a native of Garzón. The sculptor Emiro Garzón resides in La Jagua, a small village that belongs to Garzón. Colombian citizen Pablo Emilio Figueroa Urriago was the founder of the bambuco music and folkloric festivals in the town. The teacher and novelist Antonio Iriarte Cadena and the writers Amadeo González Treviño (Author of Footprints of war, book of chronicles and a diatribe against the local sufferings by the El Quimbo dam), founder of the literary magazine and cultural organization Cuatro Tablas and Diego Calle Cadavid and Hamilton Benedicto Lizcano Parra reside in this municipality. Writer and journalist Juan Pablo Plata spent his childhood and adolescence here. Women's achievements in this town are also highlighted. Irma Vargas Cadena was the first female doctor in this city and her sister Ángela Constanza Vargas Cadena (Angie McCallum), was, in turn, the first female Petroleum Engineer. The controversial politician who opposed the peace talks with the FARC and the post-conflict, Senator Ernesto Macías Tovar, of the Democratic Center, was born in this town and occasionally visits the city. Jaime Bravo Motta and Edgar Bonilla Ramírez have run the power as mayors while they have been involved in investigations for their administrative actions of the public treasury and the money intended for health care and the recreational center Manila.

The Baracoa Cultural Foundation, known in the country's music scene for its contribution to Colombian Andean music, comes from this municipality.

== Economy ==
The municipality is mainly agricultural, based on the cultivation of coffee, cacao, fruit, and livestock. Fish farming is an important part of its economy. Garzón market products are sold in Neiva and Bogotá.

== Climate ==
The town of Garzón is known for its mild climate, with a winter season (rainy season) in the months of March, April and May, and summer season in other months of the year (November, December and January) when temperatures as high as 30 °C. are reached.

Garzón is watered by the Magdalena and Suaza rivers and other minor rivers, including Agua Caliente, Caguancito, Cara de Perro, Damas, Garzoncito, Pescado and Río Loro.

Climate data for Garzón/El Agrado (Betulia La), elevation 780 m (2,560 ft), (1981–2010)
Month	Jan	Feb	Mar	Apr	May	Jun	Jul	Aug	Sep	Oct	Nov	Dec	Year
Mean daily maximum °C (°F)	30.9 (87.6)	31.2 (88.2)	30.6 (87.1)	30.5 (86.9)	30.5 (86.9)	30.3 (86.5)	30.3 (86.5)	31.2 (88.2)	32.2 (90.0)	31.5 (88.7)	30.2 (86.4)	30.2 (86.4)	30.8 (87.4)
Daily mean °C (°F)	24.5 (76.1)	24.5 (76.1)	24.2 (75.6)	24.1 (75.4)	24.1 (75.4)	23.8 (74.8)	23.7 (74.7)	24.3 (75.7)	24.8 (76.6)	24.8 (76.6)	24.2 (75.6)	24.2 (75.6)	24.3 (75.7)
Mean daily minimum °C (°F)	19.0 (66.2)	19.2 (66.6)	19.4 (66.9)	19.4 (66.9)	19.3 (66.7)	18.7 (65.7)	18.1 (64.6)	18.1 (64.6)	18.3 (64.9)	19.0 (66.2)	19.6 (67.3)	19.4 (66.9)	19.0 (66.2)
Average precipitation mm (inches)	89.0 (3.50)	111.5 (4.39)	119.2 (4.69)	97.4 (3.83)	90.2 (3.55)	54.6 (2.15)	45.0 (1.77)	27.5 (1.08)	44.0 (1.73)	133.4 (5.25)	137.9 (5.43)	120.2 (4.73)	1,063.8 (41.88)
Average precipitation days	12	13	16	18	19	16	16	12	11	15	18	15	180
Average relative humidity (%)	77	77	79	80	79	78	74	70	69	73	78	79	76
Source: Instituto de Hidrologia Meteorologia y Estudios Ambientales

Climate data for Zuluaga, Garzón, elevation 1,270 m (4,170 ft), (1981–2010)
Month	Jan	Feb	Mar	Apr	May	Jun	Jul	Aug	Sep	Oct	Nov	Dec	Year
Mean daily maximum °C (°F)	26.6 (79.9)	26.9 (80.4)	26.4 (79.5)	26.0 (78.8)	25.9 (78.6)	25.4 (77.7)	25.2 (77.4)	25.5 (77.9)	26.4 (79.5)	26.5 (79.7)	26.0 (78.8)	26.1 (79.0)	26.0 (78.8)
Daily mean °C (°F)	20.6 (69.1)	20.7 (69.3)	20.6 (69.1)	20.6 (69.1)	20.5 (68.9)	20.0 (68.0)	19.7 (67.5)	19.9 (67.8)	20.2 (68.4)	20.4 (68.7)	20.4 (68.7)	20.4 (68.7)	20.3 (68.5)
Mean daily minimum °C (°F)	15.8 (60.4)	16.0 (60.8)	16.3 (61.3)	16.4 (61.5)	16.5 (61.7)	15.9 (60.6)	15.4 (59.7)	15.3 (59.5)	15.3 (59.5)	15.9 (60.6)	16.3 (61.3)	16.1 (61.0)	15.9 (60.6)
Average precipitation mm (inches)	89.4 (3.52)	99.6 (3.92)	126.5 (4.98)	148.9 (5.86)	139.8 (5.50)	115.1 (4.53)	95.1 (3.74)	66.6 (2.62)	83.0 (3.27)	129.6 (5.10)	130.0 (5.12)	111.9 (4.41)	1,335.5 (52.58)
Average precipitation days	14	15	19	23	24	23	21	19	19	20	20	18	236
Average relative humidity (%)	83	83	85	85	85	85	83	82	81	82	85	85	84
Mean monthly sunshine hours	127.1	101.6	83.7	75.0	86.8	84.0	93.0	89.9	96.0	96.1	99.0	114.7	1,146.9
Mean daily sunshine hours	4.1	3.6	2.7	2.5	2.8	2.8	3.0	2.9	3.2	3.1	3.3	3.7	3.1
Source: Instituto de Hidrologia Meteorologia y Estudios Ambientales
