= The Vortex (novel) =

1924 novel by José Eustasio Rivera

- First edition
- Author: José Eustasio Rivera
- Original title: La Vorágine
- Translator: Earle K. James
- Language: Spanish
- Genre: Telurismo, novel
- Published: 1924 (Luis Tamayo y Cia.)
- Publication place: Colombia
- English publication date: 2003

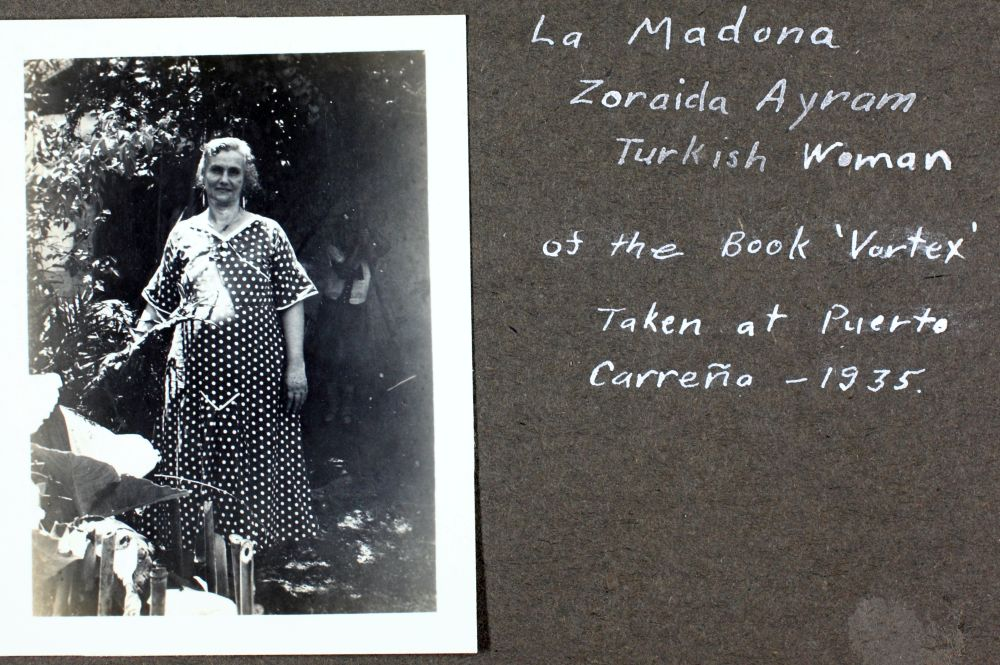
Madona Zoraida Ayram, known as 'la madona' in the novel, a rubber baroness of the time period.^{:52} (1935)

The Vortex (Spanish: La Vorágine) is a novel written in 1924 by the Colombian author José Eustasio Rivera. It is set in at least three different bioregions of Colombia during the rubber boom. This novel narrates the adventures of Arturo Cova, a hot-headed proud chauvinist and his lover Alicia, as they elope from Bogotá, through the eastern plains and later, escaping from criminal misgivings, through the Amazon rainforest of Colombia.

In this way Rivera is able to describe the magic of these regions, with their rich biodiversity, and the lifestyle of the inhabitants. However, one of the main objectives of the novel is to reveal the appalling conditions that workers in the rubber factories experience. La Vorágine also introduces the reader to the tremendous hardship of enduring the overwhelming and adverse environment of the rainforest, as the protagonists (Arturo Cova and Alicia) get lost and are unable to be found. As the book says: ¡Los devoró la selva! (literally, "The jungle devoured them!").

The novel is written in an elegant and refined prose, full of metaphors and prosaic poetry, that shows the beauty and exoticism of the virgin rainforest.

The book focuses on two rubber collecting regions, one on the border near Venezuela, during Tomás Funes reign of terror. While the second region is in the Putumayo, controlled by Julio César Arana, during the Putumayo genocide. The author, José Eustasio Rivera, personally visited the region near Venezuela in 1918 as part of a commission. The novel is divided into six narratives, taking the form of different characters. Don Clemente Silva's experience is based on the Putumayo region, while Ramiro Estébanez recalls the crimes of Funes.

La Vorágine is noteworthy as the seminal novel of Latin American regionalism, the "jungle novel", and recognized as one of the best novels written in Colombia.

== Characters ==
=== Main characters ===
Arturo Cova: The main protagonist, a famous poet who writes the manuscript that is the framing device for the bulk of the novel. A famous poet, he is a chauvinist and a sensitive man, seducing many women with promises of marriage. At the opening of the novel, Cova flees the capital city of Bogotá with Alicia, a woman he seduced. Enters the jungle to find Alicia after she is taken by the rubber baron Barrera. During his time in the jungle, he is outspoken about the human rights abuses he witnesses, aiming to be the rubber tappers savior while also seeing himself as an adventurer in search of riches.

Clemente Silva: A rubber tapper whose recounted experiences take center stage during the second half of the novel. Entering the rubber tapping industry to search his young son who ran away from home, Silva quickly gains a reputation for being a good navigator, earning the nickname "Compass". Enduring various physical abuses over a period of several years, Silva eventually discovers his son was killed by a fallen tree years ago. Silva joins the journey with Cova to retrieve his sons bones.

=== Supporting Characters ===
Alicia: Cova's companion who flees Bogotá with him to escape a forced marriage to a rich and old landowner. An educated woman from a wealthy family who is fearful and unequipped for her time in the jungle. Jealous of Cova's infidelities.

Griselda: Mistress of La Maporita ranch, where much of the novel takes place. The wife of Fidel Franco and one of Cova's lovers. Leaves for the jungle in search of a job opportunity, taking Alicia with her.

Fidel Franco: Owner of La Maporita ranch. An educated man who served in the military, Griselda's husband. Befriends Cova and joins his journey to the jungle to find Griselda and kill Barrera.

Antonio Correa "the mulato": Son of Sebastina, the maid who works in Fidel Franco's house, joins Cova on his journey.

Narciso Barrera: Main antagonist of the novel. A well spoken and manipulative rubber barron, he convinces the people of Llanos to become rubber tappers with the promise of riches. Seduces Griselda and Alicia and takes them and the people of Llanos to the jungle, where he subjects them to starvation and abuse.

Zoraida Ayram: A middle-aged businesswoman who works in the Amazon. Seduced Cova and Clemente Silva's son, Luciano.

Pipa: A conniving man, he originally steals from Cova, then joins his adventure after talking his way out of death. He lived with various indigenous tribes for a number of years, learning how to survive in the jungle.

Clarita: Venezuelan prostitute who dreams of returning to her homeland and reuniting with her parents, works for Barrera.

Helí Mesa: a subordinate of Fidel Franco's during his time in the army, joins Franco and Cova on their journey to the jungle.

Don Rafo: A friend of Cova's father, helps Cova and Alicia flee Bogotá and takes them to La Maporita ranch.

== English translation ==
- Rivera, José Eustasio. The Vortex. Earle K. James, translator (1928). Panamericana Editorial Ltd (2003). ISBN 958-30-0804-4.
- Rivera, José Eustasio. The Vortex. Victor Meadowcroft and Daniel Hahn, translators. Charco Press (2024). ISBN 9781913867980.

== See also ==
- Colombian literature
- Putumayo genocide
