= Carlos Martins =

Carlos Martins is the name of:

- Carlos Wizard Martins (born 1956), head of the Wizard Language Institute
- Carlos Martins (footballer) (born 1982), Portuguese football midfielder
- Carlos Martins (musician) (born 1961), Portuguese jazz musician

== See also ==
- Carlos Martin (disambiguation)
