= Adolfo León Gómez =

Colombian poet, jurist and politician

Adolfo León Gómez (19 September 1857 – 9 June 1927) was a Colombian poet, jurist and politician born in Pasca, Cundinamarca, Republic of New Granada. He was a grandson of Josefa Acevedo de Gomez, the first secular woman writer in Colombia. His three act play in verse El Soldado, related to the decisive battle of La Humareda, and the end of the Colombian civil war of 1884-1885, gave life to the popular pasillo "El Soldado".

== Works ==
- El soldado: drama histórico 1892
