= Rivera, Huila =

Coordinates: 2.78528°N 75.2589°W

- Municipality and town
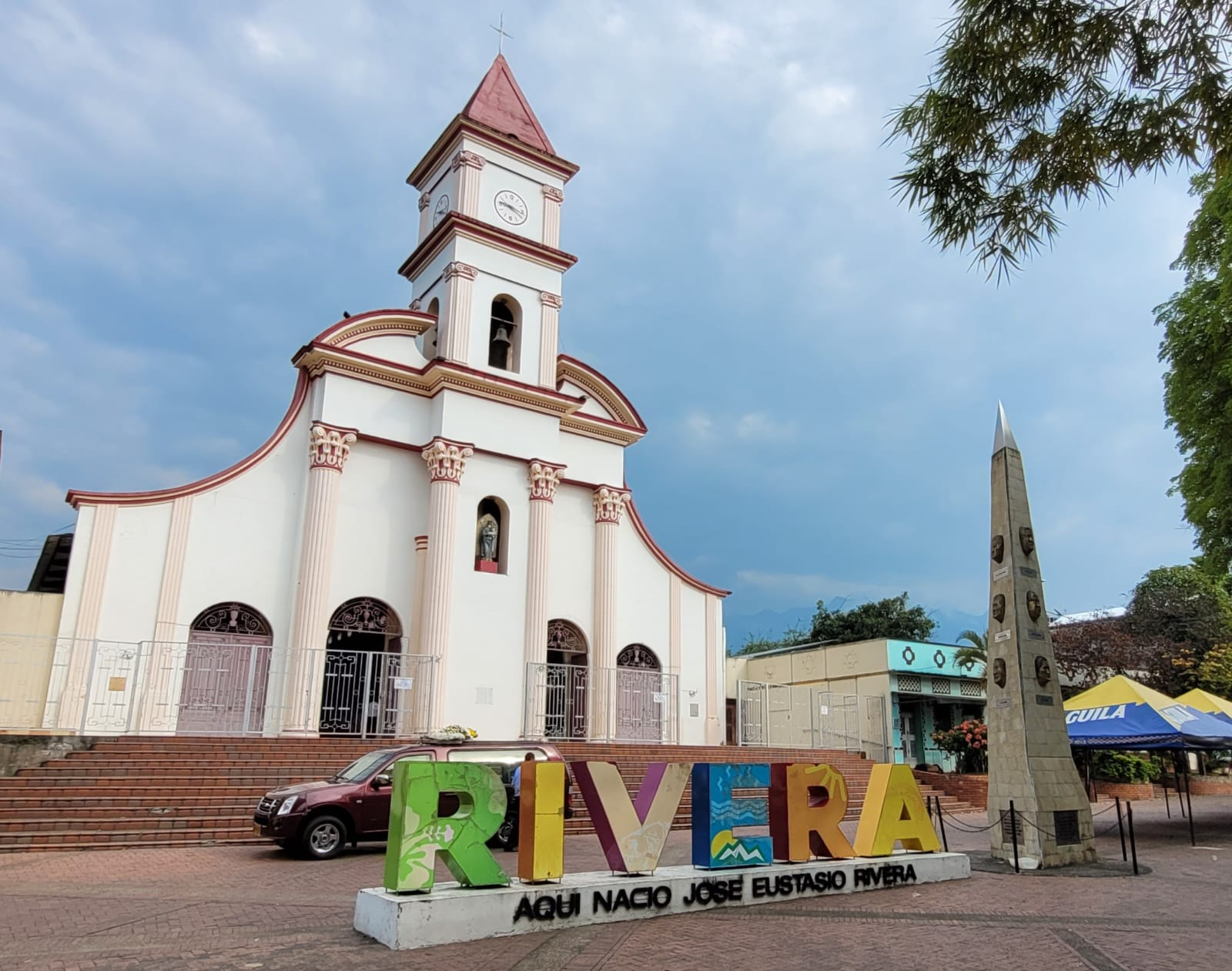
- Historic center of Rivera, February 2022

- Flag Coat of arms

- Location of the municipality and town of Rivera, Huila in the Huila Department of Colombia.
- Country: Colombia
- Department: Huila Department

Population
  - Total: 22,877
- Time zone: UTC-5 (Colombia Standard Time)

Rivera is a town and municipality in the Huila Department, Colombia.
