= Juan Pablo Plata Figueroa =

Colombian writer and journalist (born 1982)

Juan Pablo Plata
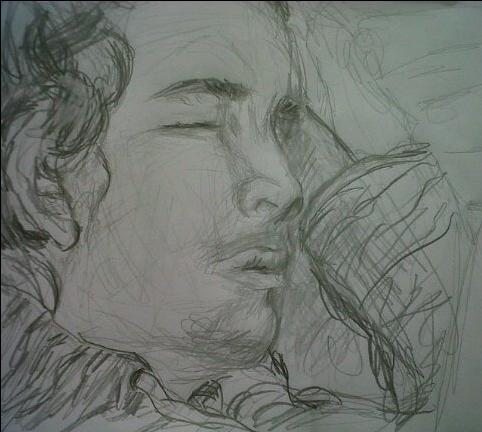
- Born: 1982 (age 43–44); Bogotá, Colombia
- Occupation: novelist
- Writing career
- Genres: fiction, non-fiction
- Literary movement: Latin American literature

Juan Pablo Plata (born 1982) is a Colombian writer, journalist and researcher.

== Personal life ==
Plata spent his childhood in Garzón (Huila). He graduated from the Emilio Valenzuela School in Bogotá. He started studying literature at the Universidad de los Andes, but finished his literary studies at the Universidad Javeriana in Bogotá with an emphasis in publishing.

He completed his Master of Fine Arts in the bilingual Creative Writing program at the University of Texas at El Paso. He currently lives between Tuvalu, Colombia, and the United States, where he completed a master's degree in creative writing. He has also worked as a seller of art and antiques.

== Literary work ==
Plata edited the magazine La movida literaria, together with fellow writers Andrés Mauricio Muñoz and Sebastián Pineda Buitrago which sparked a parody in a blog (La Bobada Literaria) and controversy in the magazines El Malpensante and Arcadia. He edited issue no. 40 and 41 of the bilingual magazine Rio Grande Review from the University of Texas at El Paso. It contained a special annex of bilingual hypermedia literature with contributions from academics such as Scott Rettberg and Leonardo Flores.

He writes literary criticism for Colombian and Mexican media. He currently lives between Tuvalu, Colombia and the United States, where he completed a master's degree in literary creation. He has collaborated with the newspaper El Tiempo, Tras la Cola de la Rata with political columns, Letralia, Diario del Huila, Cuadruvio, El Espectador, Crónica, Banco de Occidente Credential Magazine, Kienyke, Level Magazine, Léase a Plena Noche, La Matera and the Cultural and Bibliographic Bulletin of the Bank of the Republic of Colombia. He classified the literary subgenre Mortara.

== Books ==
He was anthologized in the book Umpalá (Sic Editores, 2006), Inhabited heart, and Recent Stories about Love in Colombia (Algaida. Grupo Anaya, 2010. Spain). He published one of the first anthologies of Colombian short-stories in the 21st century, called Signals of path, which featured 27 Colombian authors (Señales de ruta, Arango Editores, 2008 and 2012 ebook re-edition)

He won two Andiarios journalism awards in 2005 (for a website and for an interview with painter David Manzur) with the magazine La Movida Literaria and a CPB prize in 2006 with the collective journalistic weblog Generación Invisible.

As a researcher, he made a proposal for classification of electronic literature under a literary subgenre called "Mortara", to name hybrid literary works that use previous existing and classified literary genres mix with sound, images, motion pictures, etc., either in print or in hypertext. He was editor in chief of the bilingual Rio Grande Review. In 2018 he published Arqueo de los días (Inventary of days) with Ibáñez Editores and Silver Editions. It was a non fiction personal anthology of journalism, with interviews (to Enrique Vila-Matas, Tryno Maldonado, Juan Villoro), with chronicles and profiles in Spanish. He was an editor of the literary horror magazine Léase a plena noche in Colombia. He currently works as a contributor to the magazine Crónica.

In 2021, he published his first book of poetry entitled Occult Neon in which he pays tribute to themes of (metaliterature) and writers such as Stefan Zweig, Antonio Machado and Walter Benjamin.. Author of the short story book Love exists in Grupo Editorial Ibáñez, Asterión's Labyrinth Collection, 2025.
