= José Eustasio Rivera =

Colombian lawyer and novelist (1888-1928)

José Eustasio Rivera Salas
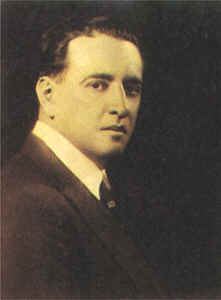
- Born: February 19, 1888; Rivera, Huila, Colombia
- Died: December 1, 1928 (aged 40); New York City, United States
- Resting place: Central Cemetery of Bogotá
- Education: National University of Colombia (B.A.)
- Occupation: Lawyer
- Writing career
- Language: Colombian Spanish
- Period: 1924–1928
- Genre: Novel
- Notable work: The Vortex
- Movement: Modernismo

José Eustasio Rivera Salas (February 19, 1888 – December 1, 1928) was a Colombian lawyer and author primarily known for his national epic The Vortex.

== Early life ==
José Eustasio Rivera was born on February 19, 1888, in Aguas Calientes, a hamlet of the city of Neiva, later that year the hamlet was incorporated into the newly created municipality of San Mateo, which was later renamed Rivera in honour of José Eustasio. His parents were Eustasio Rivera Escobar and Catalina Salas, and he was the first boy and fifth child out of eleven children, of whom eight reached adulthood: José Eustasio, Luis Enrique, Margarita, Virginia, Laura, Susana, Julia and Ernestina.

In spite of his family's economic situation, he received a Catholic education thanks to the help of other relatives and his own efforts. He attended Santa Librada school in Neiva and then San Luis Gonzaga in Elías. In 1906 he received a scholarship to study at the normal school in Bogotá. In 1909, after graduating, he moved to Ibagué where he worked as a school inspector. In 1912 he enrolled at the Faculty of Law and Political Sciences of National University, graduating as a lawyer in 1917.

== Career ==
After a failed attempt to be elected to the senate, he was appointed Legal Secretary of the Colombo-Venezuelan Border Commission to determine the limits with Venezuela, there he had the opportunity to travel through the Colombian jungles, rivers, and mountains, giving him a first hand experience of the subjects he would later write. Disappointed with the lack of resources offered by his government for his trip, he abandoned the commission and continued travelling on his own. He later rejoined the commission, but before that he went to Brazil, where he became acquainted with the work of important Brazilian writers of his time, particularly Euclides da Cunha. In this venture he became familiar with life in the Colombian plains and with problems related to the extraction of rubber in the Amazon jungle, a matter that would be central in his major work, La vorágine (1924) (translated as The Vortex), now considered one of the most important novels in Latin American literary history. To write this novel he read extensively about the situation of rubber workers in the Amazon basin.

After the success of his novel, he was elected, in 1925, as a member for the Investigative Commission for Exterior Relations and Colonization. He also published several articles in newspapers in Colombia. In these pieces, he criticized irregularities in government contracts, and denounced the abandonment of the rubber areas of Colombia and the mistreatment of workers. He also publicly defended his novel, which had been criticized by some Colombian literary critics as being too poetic. This criticism would be largely silenced by the wide praise the novel was receiving everywhere else.

== Death ==
Rivera had arrived in New York the last week of April 1928 in the hopes of translating his novel into English, publishing it in the United States, and turning it into a motion picture film with the goal of exporting Colombian culture abroad. His venture, although riddled with difficulties, was moving along when on November 27 he suffered an attack of seizures and was taken to the Stuyvesant Polyclinic Hospital where he remained for four days in a comatose state until his death on December 1, 1928.

After his death, his body was transported by ship from New York to Barranquilla on the United Fruit Company's ship the Sixaola. At his arrival on port, his body was transported in procession to the Pro-Cathedral of Saint Nicholas of Tolentino where a requiem mass was given and the body laid in chapelle ardente. The casket then made its way down the Magdalena onto Bogotá on the mail steamship Carbonell González, arriving in Girardot and finishing by train to arrive in Bogotá on January 7, 1929, and was taken directly to the Capitolio Nacional, where it was placed lying in state for public viewing. His body was finally laid to rest in the Central Cemetery of Bogotá on January 19.

== Selected works ==
- La Vorágine [The Vortex]. Bogotá: Pontifical Xavierian University. 1924. ISBN 978-958-683-760-6. OCLC 255563404.
- Tierra de Promisión [Promised Land]. Bogotá: Pontifical Xavierian University. 1921. ISBN 978-958-683-958-7. OCLC 230814677.

== See also ==
- Jorge Isaacs
- León de Greiff
