= Arturo Camacho Ramírez =

Arturo Camacho Ramírez (1910-1982) was a Colombian poet. He was born in Ibagué, Tolima. He studied law at the National University, but never finished his degree. In 1935 he became the first of the Piedracielistas to publish a book of poetry, Espejo de naufragios, although he had already written several poems for literary magazines of the time.

Besides being a poet, he was a diplomat and journalist. He served as the representative of Colombia to UNESCO in Paris and as a special curator in La Guajira, where he met Olga Castaño Castillo, who would later become his wife and the inspiration for his only play, Luna de arena.

He had several opinion columns in different media, among which "Transposiciones" (for El Espectador) stands out. He also had his own radio show on HJCK called "What is your hobby?", in which he interviewed important Colombians of the day.

== Works ==
- Espejo de naufragios (1935).
- Oda a Charles Baudelaire (1945).
- Luna de arena (1948).
- Vida pública (1962).
- Límites del hombre (1964).
- Homenaje a Pablo Neruda (Obra en colaboración-1974).
- Carrera de la vida (1976).
- Obras completas (póstumo - 1982).
