= Melba Escobar =

Colombian writer and journalist

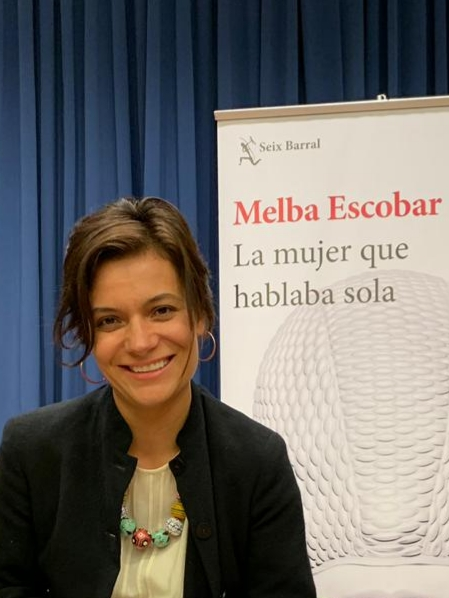
- Born: 1976; Cali
- Occupation: Journalist

Melba Escobar de Nogales (born 1976 Cali, Colombia) is a Colombian writer and journalist.

== Life ==
She graduated from Universidad de los Andes. She writes for El Espectador of Bogotá and El País of Cali.

== Works ==
- Bogotá Sueña. La Ciudad Por Los Niños, Editorial Codice, 2007
- Duermevela, Editorial Planeta, 2010
- Johnny y el mar, Tragaluz Editores, 2014
- La Casa de la Belleza, Emecé Editores. 2015
  - House of Beauty translated by Elizabeth Bryer, Harper Collins,
- La Mujer que Hablaba Sola, Editorial Seix Barral. 2019
