= Andrés Felipe Solano =

Colombian novelist (born 1977)

Andrés Felipe Solano (born 9 February 1977) is a Colombian novelist who published Sálvame, Joe Louis (2010); Los hermanos Cuervo (2012) and Salario Mínimo-Vivir con nada (2016), a long-form essay about his experience as a factory worker living on the minimum wage for six months in Medellín, Colombia, where he rented a room in a notoriously violent neighborhood. A previous version of this piece was chosen as the finalist for the prize awarded by the Fundación Nuevo Periodismo Iberoamericano, chaired by Gabriel García Márquez in 2008. He also published Corea, apuntes desde la cuerda floja, a non-fiction book about his life in South Korea, which received the 2016 Premio Biblioteca de Narrativa Colombiana prize. His third novel, Cementerios de neón (2017) is partly based in a Colombian veteran from the Korean war. His work has appeared in The New York Times Magazine, McSweeney's, Words Without Borders and World Literature Today. He was featured in Granta 113: The Best of Young Spanish-language Novelists. He has served as writer in residence in Yaddo, Ledig House, Toji Cultural Center, Yoeonhui Arts Space and Universidad de Alcalá de Henares.

== Life ==
He lived in Medellín. He teaches at the Literature Translation Institute of Korea.

His work appeared in the Catapult, New York Times Magazine, Words Without Borders, Anew, and Granta.

== Works ==
- Sálvame, Joe Louis, Alfaguara, 2007, ISBN 9789587045710 (Save Me, Joe Louis)
- Los hermanos Cuervo. Penguin Random House Grupo Editorial Colombia. 1 April 2013. pp. 1–. ISBN 978-958-758-506-3. (The Cuervo Brothers).
- Corea: apuntes desde la cueda floja, 2015
- Salario mínimo, vivir con nada, 2015
- Cementerios de neón, 2017
- Los días de la fiebre, Temas de hoy, 2020.
- Gloria, Sexto Piso, 2023

== Short stories ==
- Pig Skin, Granta, 2014
- White Flamingo, McSweeney's, 2014
- Manos de Diamante, universocentro, 2018
- We´ll All End Up Rocks in a Lake, Busan Biennale 2020
