= Juan Álvarez (writer) =

Colombian writer

Juan Álvarez (born 1978) is a Colombian writer. He is the author of Heroegram, Narrative Arkhe, and The Three Pillars of Change.

== Biography ==
Álvarez started his career at the Writer's Workshop at the Universidad Central in Bogotá. In 2002, he moved to the US-Mexican border, where he earned his M.F.A from the University of Texas at El Paso.

His book of short stories, Falsas Alarmas, was awarded the National Prize for Short-Stories by the City of Bogota in 2005. Álvarez was selected to attend the first Hay Festival held in Cartagena de Indias in 2006. In 2008, he participated in the first meeting of Young Latin American Fiction Writers in Havana.

In 2011, Álvarez published his first novel, C. M. no record, based on the underground musical life of the Bogotá and Medellín rock and roll scene.

He has published short-stories, interviews, and essays in literary journals and magazines such as: El Malpensante, Número, Etiqueta Negra, Donjuan, Letralia, and the Rio Grande Review.

He is the co-editor of the Hidalgo-based literary journal, El Perro, and manages the DUD project.

Several Colombian critics have remarked Álvarez's use of language in Falsas alarmas as an evidence of a “young writer who knows his craft, and has talent and appreciation for the written word” (Guido Tamayo) and of a style “without pretensions” (Francisco Barrios). Others have insisted in the desolated universe of these short stories, populated mainly by young people “not marked by exotic adventures (...) but by the daily discovery of their absolute solitude” (Diana Ospina).
