= María Mercedes Carranza =

Colombian writer and poet (1945–2003)

Maria Mercedes Carranza
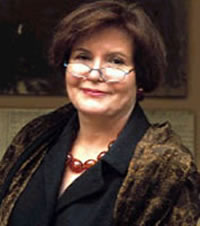
- Born: 24 May 1945; Bogotá, Colombia
- Died: 11 July 2003 (aged 58); Bogotá, Colombia
- Education: University of Los Andes
- Occupations: Writer, poet, journalist
- Notable work: El canto de las moscas (1997); Nueva poesía colombiana (1972); Tengo miedo (1983)
- Spouse: Fernando Garavito

María Mercedes Carranza (24 May 1945 – 11 July 2003) was a poet and journalist from Bogotá, Colombia, who spent most of her childhood in Spain.

== Biography ==
=== Early life ===
Carranza was the second child of Rosa Coronado and poet Eduardo Carranza. She was one of four children in the family. Her father was also a poet, he moved to Spain as cultural attache at the Colombian embassy in Madrid. María lived there from ages six to thirteen, with periods in Paris, and under the intellectual influence of her father and her maternal aunt, the poet Elisa Mújica who was also living in Spain during those years. "The fable of my childhood was woven by their legends and stories; with her I discovered the power of the word," Carranza said in an interview with Carlos Jáuregui.

The family returned to Bogota, Colombia in 1958, where the young Maria Mercedes lived a difficult period of re-adaptation to her native country. "When I came back, I still played with dolls and didn't know how babies were born. I had left Spain and my childhood, and I felt a terrible cultural nostalgia that I faced with the decision to belong to Colombia".

=== Adulthood ===
She finished her secondary studies to become a bilingual secretary in Colombia. She would later study philosophy and literature, first in Madrid and intermittently between 1965 and 1978, in the University of Los Andes (Colombia) in Bogotá, where she graduated with a thesis on her father's work. This thesis later became one of the most authorized studies about Eduardo Carranza.

She promoted the writing of José Asunción Silva. Her work was sometimes referred to as "feminist", as it ridiculed giving women secondary roles, but Carranza rejected the feminist label as "imported" and not fitting her concern on class differences. She had political involvements, joining the 19th of April Movement when it became the M-19 Democratic Alliance. Juan Luis Panero was her second husband. She committed suicide on July 11, 2003, ingesting an overdose of antidepressants. Two of her closest friends had recently died and her brother Ramiro Carranza had been kidnapped by leftist guerilla group FARC.

== Career ==
Carranza published her first book of poetry, Vainas y otros poemas, in 1972.

The final collection published during her lifetime, 1997's El canto de las moscas is an overtly political reflection on violence in contemporary Colombia through the sites of massacres.
