= Ruben Varona =

Colombian author and literary critic

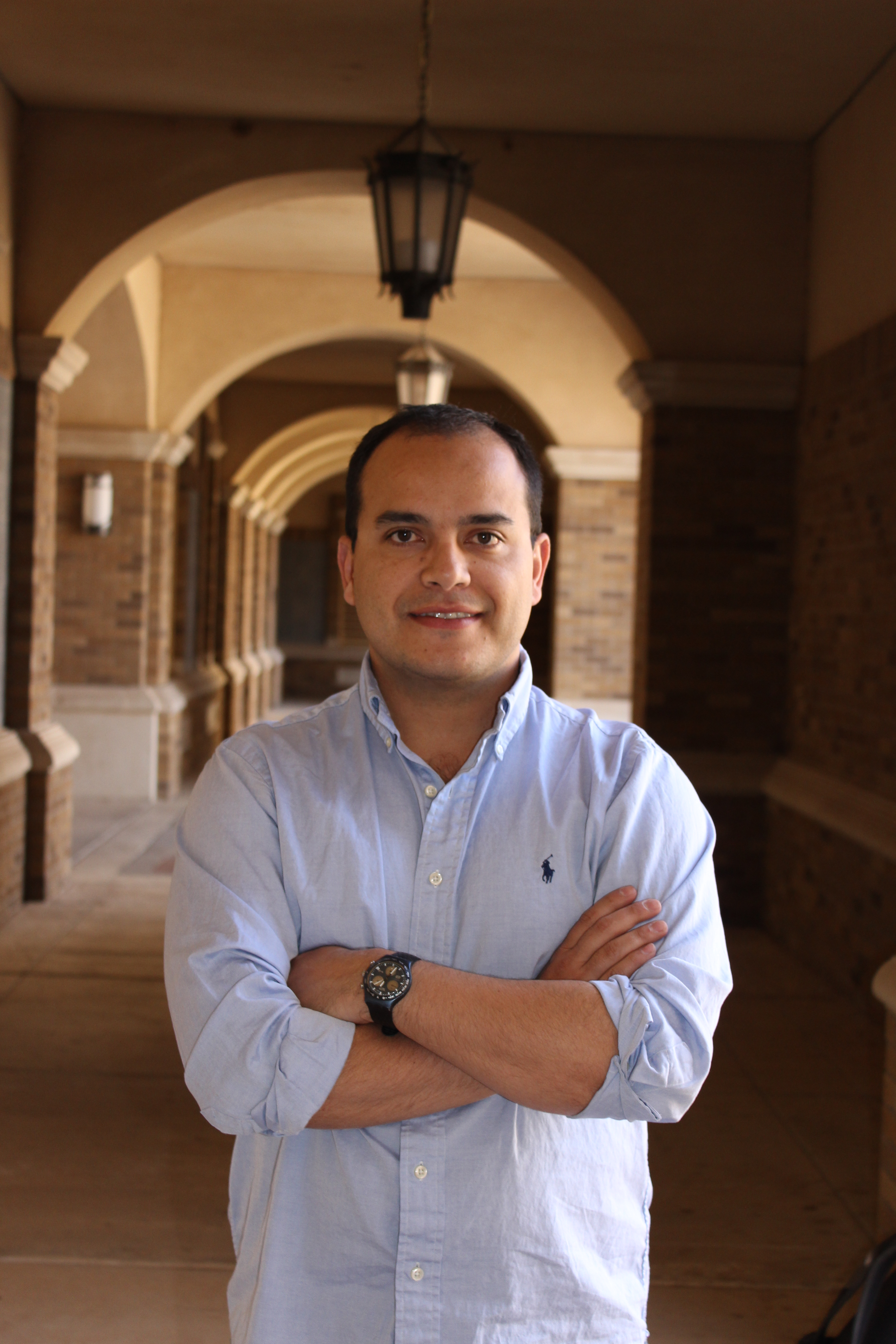
- Born: Rubén Andres Varona Herrera; April 7, 1980 (age 46); Popayán, Cauca, Colombia
- Occupations: Writer, literary critic
- Writing career
- Genres: Novels, Short stories, Poems, Essays, Chronic

Ruben Varona is a Colombian author and literary critic specialized in crime and historical fiction.

Born in Popayán (1980), he teaches Latin American Literature at Lycoming College. He has a Ph.D. in Hispanic Literature from Texas Tech University (2018) and a bilingual M.F.A. in Creative Writing from the University of Texas at El Paso (2012). He is the co-founder of the Revista Cultural La Mandrágora in Popayán. His deep interest in crime fiction has gained him recognition, being elected Vice-President for Latin American of the International Association of Crime Writers AIEP-IACW (2008-2016).

Rubén Varona’s writing explores social conflicts and the potential for individual resistance. His literary and academic work reveal structural problems in fictional societies raising awareness of conflicting perspectives of social justice. For example, in his most recent novel, La viuda del molino (2023), he represents the cruelty of the independence movement in Colombia at the beginning of the 19th Century with a juxtaposition of voices, some of them well represented in history and others that have been marginalized and ignore to reflect on the challenges of social reconciliation today. Or in La secta de los asesinos(2016), coauthored with Carlos Bermeo, he approaches today’s terrorism from a historical perspective that humanizes the political and religious tensions between East and West. This work was a finalist for the Premio Planeta-Casa de América award (2012). The media credited it for anticipating the foundation of the Islamic State.

Regarding Rubén Varona’s writing style, critics have said that he uses brutality, obscenity, and crime to expose reality's dark skeleton and reveal the horror implicit in our canon of beauty. For example, about his novel La hora del cheesecake (2015), the critic has highlighted the “intensity of language that forces the reader to place themselves in different planes and levels for the reconfiguration of both time and discourse,” and how it masterfully mixes the high and low culture, as well as the thriller and the corrosive satire without using the Anglo-Saxon models.

He has been chosen for several collections and anthologies of short stories: "La maldición del Garabato" en Antología Olfato de gol: nuevos cuentos de fútbol (Ed. Reino de Cordelia 2022), “Hospital psiquiátrico” en Desierto en escarlata: cuentos criminales de Ciudad Juárez. (Ed. Colectivo Zurdo Medieta, 2018), “Meninas Club” en Short Story anthology: Latein-Amerika (Ed. Beatrix Kramlovsky and Sylvia Unterrander. Trans. Eva Srna, 2014), “Punto Negro” en Céfiro: Enlace Hispano Cultural y Literario (2013), “Der Lackierte Spazierstock” en Crime fiction anthology: Zurich, Ausfahrt Mord. Switzerland. (Ed. Paul Ott. Trans. Susanna Mende, 2011), “El olor de los jazmines” en Rio Grande Review (2010), “Un vuelo de algo con alas de polvo.” Señales de Ruta. Antología del cuento colombiano. (Ed. Juan Pablo Plata, 2008), “Los restos del patriarca” en El Fungible. Especial de relatos para España y América Latina. (Ed. Ayuntamiento de Alcobendas 2008), and “Cábala en re menor” in the anthology Al filo de las palabras (Ed. Carlos Muñoz, 2001).

== Publications ==
=== Novels ===
- La viuda del molino (2023)
- La secta de los asesinos (2016)(co-author with Carlos Bermeo)
- La hora del cheesecake (2015)
- El sastre de las sombras (2013)
- Espérame desnuda entre los alacranes (2007)
