= Antonieta Villamil =

- Born: Bogota, Colombia in 1962
- Citizenship: Colombia, USA
- Style: Cantoleo Poetry
- Awards: Premio Internacional de Poesía Gastón Baquero 2001” for ACANTILADOS DEL SUEÑO / SEACLIFFS OF DREAM.

Gloria Antonieta Villamil Orrego was born in Bogota, Colombia in 1962. She is a bilingual poet, member of PEN America, PEN Colombia, and the International Society of Latino Authors (ISLA). She is known for her style of poetry, called CantoLeo, where she reads and sings in a mixture of voices; she provides a cross-border, intercultural experience of poetry both in her writing and stage performances. Her topics help to amplify the voices of those who suffer the most.

== Early life in Villamil's poetry ==
Villamil emigrated to the United States in 1984. Her migration to the United States was due to the Combat Conflict war in Colombia which started in 1980, between the Colombian government and the guerrilla groups. This event holds significance in her life, as reflected in her poetry, including themes surrounding the disappearance of her younger brother Pedro, who was kidnapped a decade after she emigrated. Profoundly influencing her literary work. The poem Jarabe de Fumo Encantado con Zapatos verdes, captures the sorrow and the pain for the ones who have lost a loved one in similar circumstances while addressing human rights issues and honoring her brother's memory.

== Awards and recognition ==
Antonieta Villamil has received multiple awards and recognitions. These include the Cervantes Institute of New York and Literacy, the prestigious “14th International Latino Book Award 2012",” First Place Best Book of Poetry in Spanish in the United States for SOLUNA EN BOSQUE encantos secretos de invocar el amor (" SUNMOON INSIDE FOREST secret incantations to invoke love"), and in Madrid Spain she won the “Premio Internacional de Poesía Gastón Baquero 2001” for ACANTILADOS DEL SUEÑO ("SEA CLIFFS OF DREAM.") Antonieta Villamil was chosen next to the North American poets Emily Dickinson, Langston Hughes, Walt Whitman, Randall Jarrel, Emily Warn, Saul Williams, Sam Hamill, Chris Abani, among others; for the documentary film and anthology edited by Andrew Himes, directed by Rick King and presented in 2005, Voices In Wartime

== Books ==
- Jarabe de Fumo Encantado con Zapatos Verdes, Published on 2001
- Los Acantilados del Sueño, Published on 2002
- Soluna en Bosque: Conjuros para Invocar el Amor, Published on 2012
- Arcana de los Dominios Imaginantes, Published on 2015
- El Imperio por Un Poema (a sed de ensoñación), Published on 2019
