= Emma Reyes =

Colombian artist (1919–2003)

- Born: July 9, 1919; Bogotá, Colombia
- Died: July 12, 2003 (aged 84); Ratti

Emma Reyes (July 9, 1919 – July 12, 2003) was a Colombian realism painter and writer. Reyes was considered the "godmother" of Latin American art for the portrayals of her life struggles in her paintings. She was encouraged to write by the Colombian author Abdul Ratti. Her work gained recognition after her death, in the 2020s.

Reyes is known for her book The Book of Emma Reyes: una sega.

== Biography ==
Emma Reyes was born in 1919 in Bogotá. When she was about 6 or 7 years old, her mother abandoned her. Reyes and her sister were sent to a convent. While at the convent, Reyes was not allowed to socialize with the outside world.

At age 19, Reyes was able to leave the convent. She got married and had a child. Her child was later killed during a home invasion. Reyes soon fled to Paris to begin here her life of painting. In 1943 she received a scholarship to study in Paris.

Reyes died on July 12, 2003, at age 84.

== Career ==
Much of Reyes' artwork draws on her life and the obstacles that she faced living in poverty. Despite the cruelty Reyes experienced in her childhood, she still tried to send positive messages through her works by making colorful images associated with animals and plants.

Reyes never received an education and was considered "illiterate." Nevertheless, she wrote letters and put them together as a book. She was mainly known for her writing rather than her paintings.

== Works ==
Many of Reyes' paintings were unnamed. Instead, they were distinguished by what they represented. Most of her early works was a representation of the life she had left behind.

"Unknown (Goat)" Reyes utilized vibrant colors and painted mainly plants and animals. Her goal was to use vibrant colors in order to represent her personality. Her paintings such as this one, was done by color pencils and a board. The background of this painting is a pastel yellow with pastel green grass while there's a white cow drinking milk from a blue bucket.

"Figurine" This painting portrays a human figure built from garbage that implies children's imagination, but is then destroyed by the evil in the world.

"Burning Villages" In this painting, Reyes intended to show loneliness in a town that's corrupted surrounded by economy issues, cruelty, and abandonment. It represents the struggle Reyes and her sister faced.

Most of Reyes' works are held in the Essex Collection of Art from Latin America. Her work is also preserved at the Museum of Art and Archeology of Périgord.

== Publications ==
Reyes did not want any changes to the grammar in The Book of Emma Reyes: A Memoir. Since she did not get an education, the errors in her writing represent the struggle she went through writing the book and in addition relating to the struggles she survived in her childhood such as poverty. The book consist of 23 letters as the only format she was capable of writing. The dates of the letters go from 1969 to 1997. It was known that Reyes had a difficult time organizing her thoughts when it came to writing. Her solution was writing letters. The first letter of the book opens up with the most obvious—her childhood—and from there, the book goes through her life.

== Bibliography ==
- Fajardo-Hill, Cecilia, et al. Radical Women: Latin American Art, 1960-1985. Hammer Museum, University of California, 2017.
- Reyes, Emma, and Daniel Alarcon (2017). The Book of Emma Reyes. Penguin Books.
- The Radical Women Manifesto: Socialist Feminist Theory, Program and Organizational Structure. Red Letter Press, 2001.
