= Juan Gustavo Cobo Borda =

Colombian writer and diplomat (1948–2022)

Juan Gustavo Cobo Borda (1948–2022) was a Colombian poet and literary critic. He was born in Bogota and studied literature at university. He worked extensively in cultural and literary fields, for example, as a founder and editor of various cultural journals including the poetry magazine Eco. He was also a diplomat. He served as cultural attaché in Buenos Aires in the 1980s, and in the same role in Madrid in the 1990s. His diplomatic career reached its peak when he was appointed ambassador to Greece.

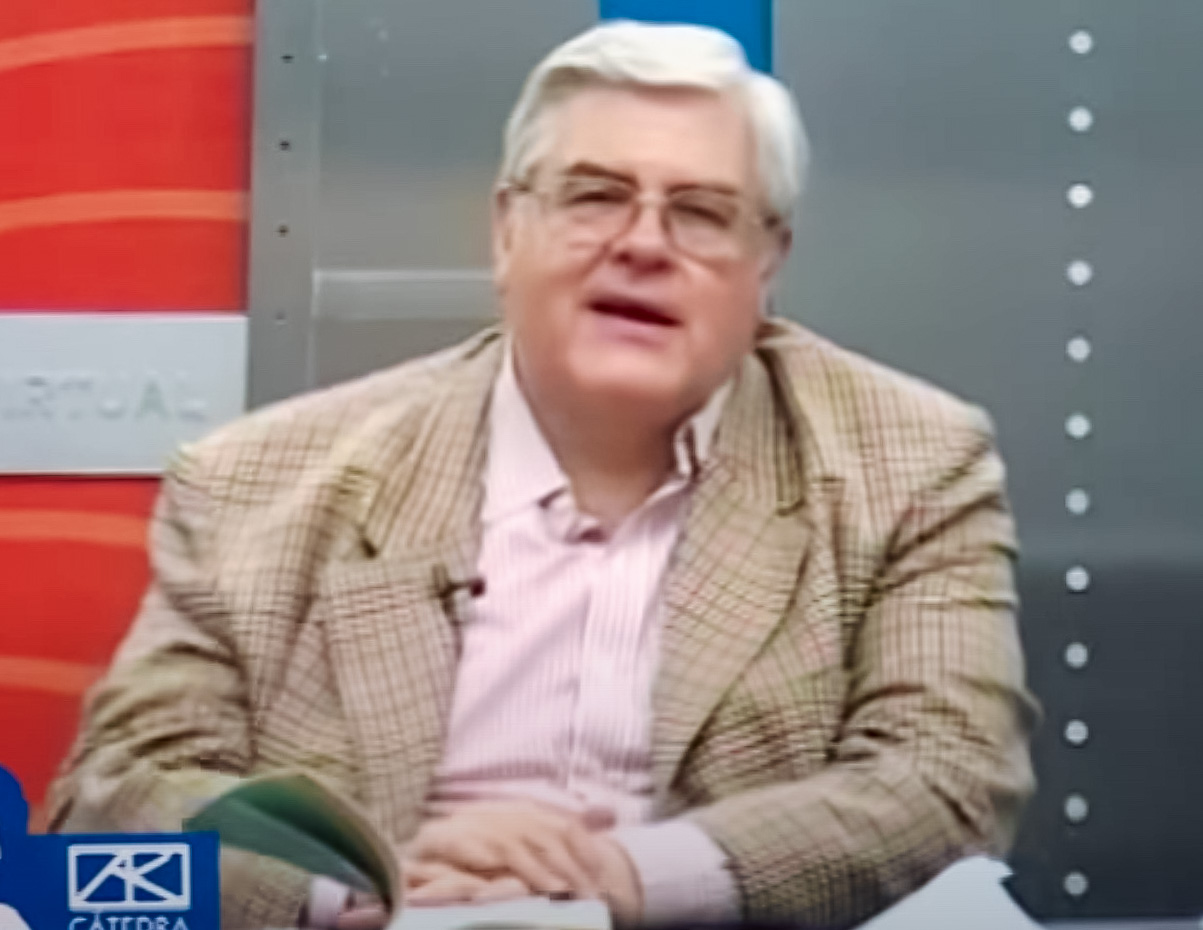
Cobo Borda

He was a judge on the panels of many literary prizes, among them the Premio Juan Rulfo, the Premio Rómulo Gallegos, the Premio Reina Sofía, and the Neustadt Prize. From 1993, he was a member of the Academia Colombiana de la Lengua, for whom he worked on a new edition of Diccionario de la Lengua Española. He received an honorary doctorate from the Universidad Central in 2016.

As a poet, he made his debut with the 1974 collection Consejos para sobrevivir. He was considered a member of the Nadaísmo group. In 2012, his Poesía reunida (1972-2012) was published by Tusquets. His poetry has been translated to English, French, German and Greek.

His critical work on Latin American literature includes the following volumes:

- Desocupado lector (1996)
- Para llegar a García Márquez (1997)
- Borges enamorado (1999)
- Historia de la poesía colombiana. Siglo xx (1984)

Other works include:

- Salón de té (1979)
- Historia portátil de la poesía colombiana (1984)
- Antología de la poesía hispanoamericana, 1985)
- La musa inclemente (2001)
- Lengua Erótica (2009)
