= Zacarías Reyán =

Reinaldo Antonio Plazas Peralta
- Born: Reinaldo Antonio Plazas Peralta; May 10, 1948 (age 78); Chiquinquirá, Boyacá, Colombia
- Education: Autodidact
- Occupation: Writer
- Writing career
- Pen name: Zacarías Reyán abbr. Z. Reyán
- Period: 1977-present
- Genre: Epic poetry
- Website: zreyan.com

Zacarías Reyán (born May 10, 1948), is the pseudonym of Reinaldo Antonio Plazas Peralta, also known as Z. Reyán, a Colombian author of novels, poems and epics in Spanish . He was born in Chiquinquirá on May 10, 1948. At present, he lives in Bogotá.

== Work ==
- Tierra Dorada: Un Canto a Hispanoamérica (poems, 1977) ISBN 958-33-7205-6
- La victoria de los inmortales: el triunfo sobre la miseria (epic poetry, 1979) OCLC 5944420
- Laberinto 1900-2001: Historia de un Pueblo y dos Mujeres (novel, 1979) ISBN 958-33-9443-2
- Cristo Rey: Un Canto a la Obra de Dios (epic poetry, 1979)
- Un Canto a la Tierra y a la Vida: Poesía del Siglo XX y de todos los Tiempos (poems, 2006) ISBN 958-33-9748-2
- Biblioteca-Casa Museo Épica 64: Memorias de Zacarías Reyán más un Poema, Far West (memoirs plus a poem, 2007) ISBN 978-958-44-1515-8
- Bicentenario: Nacimiento de un País (historic novel, 2008) ISBN 958-44-2793-8
- Obra Completa de Zacarías Reyán (anthology, 2009) ISBN 978-958-44-4335-9
