= Alfredo Iriarte =

Colombian Historian

- Born: 1932
- Died: 2002 (aged 69–70)
- Occupations: Historian, writer

Alfredo Iriarte (1932–2002) was a Colombian historian and writer, author of many short historical and fiction novels and essays.

== Career ==
His bibliography includes Lo que lengua mortal decir no pudo (1979), Bestiario tropical (1986), Episodios Bogotanos (1987), Espárragos para dos leones, Batallas y batallitas en la historia de Colombia (1993), Abominaciones y denuestos (1994), Muertes Legendarias (1996), and El jinete de Bucentauro (2000), his last novel.

Iriarte wrote commentaries on the proper idiomatic use of the Spanish language in his newspaper column Rosario de perlas, published periodically in El Tiempo for more than 25 years. He was also a frequent commentator of historical and literary ephemera in the local cultural radio station HJCK.
