= Rio Grande Review =

American literature and arts magazine

- Categories: Art, literature
- Frequency: Biannually
- Publisher: The University of Texas at El Paso
- First issue: Fall 1981
- Final issue: Spring 2013
- Company: The University of Texas at El Paso
- Country: United States
- Based in: El Paso
- Language: English, Spanish
- Website: www.utep.edu/rgr/
- ISSN: 1099-6133
- OCLC: 18660872

Rio Grande Review is an annual, bilingual (Spanish and English) magazine of contemporary literature and arts established in September 1981 in El Paso, Texas. It is published by the University of Texas at El Paso and edited by students of its Creative Writing program. Each edition of the Rio Grande Review focuses on several special topics. For example, in 2023 it published its Weird Fiction edition.The 2024 edition is dedicated to Solastalgia including topics such as science fiction, ekphrasis and ecopoetics.The magazine promotes world and border literature between Mexico and the United States.

== Autores en español publicados ==
- Sergio Ramírez
- Andrés Neuman
- Agustín Fernández Mallo
- Ricardo Piglia
- Carlos Fonseca
- Alí Calderón
- Luis Arturo Ramos
- Alejandro Zambra
- Ricardo Piglia
- Betina González
- Yuri Herrera
- Daniel Centeno
- Iván Thays
- Jon Lee Anderson
- Jaime Manrique
- Benjamin Alire Sainz (Premio Pen/Faulkner)
- Julián Herbert
- José Carlos Sánchez-Lara (Premio Nogueras)

== Editors ==
- Margarita Mejía
- Juan Álvarez
- Danial Ríos
- Betina González
- Daniel Centeno
- Mijail Lamas
- Criseida Santos Guevara
- Carolina Dávila
- Mario Martz
- Amber Miller
- Mónica Teresa Ortiz
- Andrea Salgado
- Mari Gómez
- Fabián Molina
- Alaide ventura
- Israel Terrón Holtzeimer
- Germán Barrera Toro
