= Academia Colombiana de la Lengua =

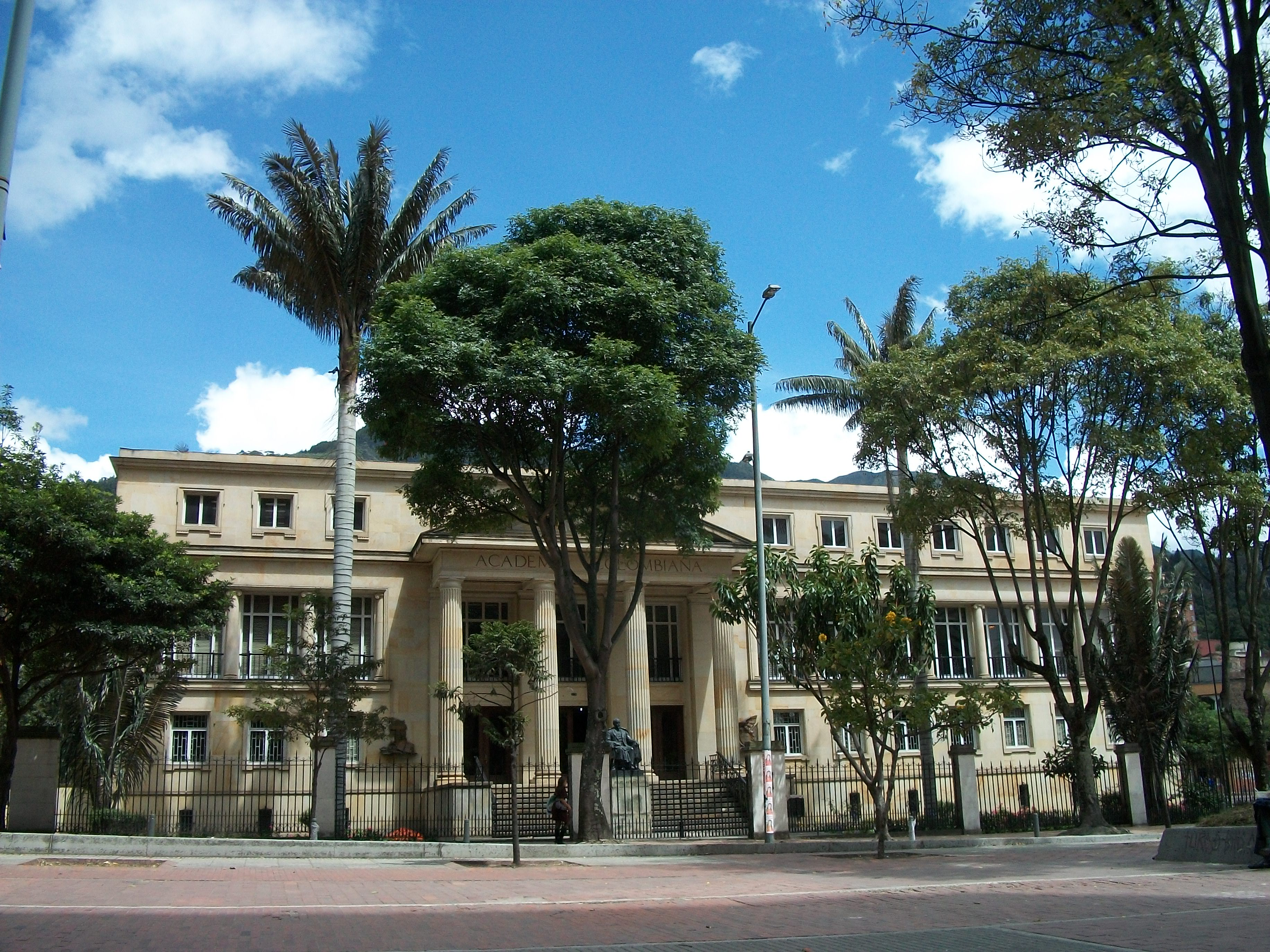
- Headquarters
- Formation: 10 May 1871; 154 years ago
- Type: NGO
- Headquarters: Carrera 3, 17–34; Bogotá, D.C., Colombia
- Official language: Colombian Spanish
- Director: Juan Carlos Vergara
- Affiliations: Association of Spanish Language Academies
- Website: academiacolombianadelalengua.co

The Academia Colombiana de la Lengua (Spanish for Colombian Academy of Language) is an association of academics and experts on the use of the Spanish language in Colombia. It is based in Bogotá, Colombia's capital, and is a member of the Association of Spanish Language Academies.

== History ==
The academy is the oldest of all the Latin American Spanish language academies, the first official academy founded outside Spain. It was founded in 1871 by a group of writers and philology specialists, including Jose Maria Vergara y Vergara, Manuel María Mallarino; Rufino José Cuervo, the father of Hispanic-American philology; and Miguel Antonio Caro.

Its first headquarters occupied the site of the house of Caro, a founder and ex-president of the group. It was constructed between 1916 and 1918, designed by Carlos Camargo Quiñones with the support of Pietro Cantini. The building was demolished to make way for the intersection of 19th Street with 7th Avenue, as was the nearby Church of the Conception.

The academy's current site, at the intersection of 3rd Avenue and 18th Street, was constructed in the late 1950s. The neoclassical-style building was designed by the Spanish architect Alfredo Rodríguez Ordaz. In 1960, the Colombian academy hosted the third Congress of the Association of Spanish Language Academies, in which the Bogotá Agreement was presented and signed. The new Rodríguez Orgaz building was inaugurated on that occasion.

Since 1960, the institution has officially advised the Colombian government on linguistic matters.

Its current and former members include Manuel María Mallarino, Germán Arciniegas, Jaime Sanín Echeverri, Diego Uribe Vargas, Otto Morales Benítez, Bárbara Muelas, Juan Gustavo Cobo Borda, Maruja Vieira, Marco Fidel Suárez, Mary Grueso and Fernando Hinestrosa Forero.

Its current director is Juan Carlos Vergara. The academy has two dozen members, as well as several honorary members, including Diego Uribe Vargas, Dora Castellanos, and Carlos Rodado Noriega.

== Library ==
The academy's library was organized by the academic Manuel José Forero. It is divided into collections based on the donor who contributed the materials or to whom they originally belonged.
