= María Josefa Acevedo Sánchez =

Colombian novelist

María Josefa Acevedo Sánchez de Gómez
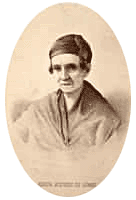
- Born: 23 January 1803; Bogotá, Viceroyalty of New Granada
- Died: 19 January 1861 (aged 57)
- Burial place: Pasca
- Other name: Josefa Acevedo
- Occupations: biographer, poet
- Spouse: Diego Fernándo Gómez

María Josefa Acevedo Sánchez de Gómez (1803–1861), generally published under the name Josefa Acevedo or Josefa Acevedo de Gómez, was a Colombian poet and prose writer.

== Biography ==
=== Early life ===
Acevedo was born in Bogotá on 23 January 1803, to José Acevedo y Gómez and Catalina Sánchez de Tejada. She had two older siblings, José Pedro and Liboria, and six younger siblings, Eusebia, José Prudencio, Juan Miguel, Alfonso, Catarina, and Concepción.

=== Career ===
Acevedo wrote formal verse, essays, and biographies of famous contemporaries and notable members of her family by blood or by marriage that were published and widely circulated during her lifetime.

The first of Acevedo's books to be published was titled Ensayo sobre los deberes de los casadosa, a cross between a long-form essay and instruction manual on married life. Due to Acevedo's misgivings about the quality of her writing and her fear of harsh judgement, the earliest editions of the work were published anonymously. Despite her concerns, the book proved very popular, however, and years later, a fifth edition was released with her name attributed as the author.

Cuadros de la vida privada de algunos granadinos, a book collecting short stories by Acevedo with plots drawn from her own life and notorious contemporary events, was published posthumously.

Acevedo also wrote a two-act stage play titled La coqueta burlada, a novel, an autobiography, and other works that were never published, some of which were purportedly lost to fire.

=== Marriage and children ===
Acevedo was married to lawyer and politician Diego Fernándo Gómez. Together, they had two daughters, Amalia and Rosa and adopted a son, Joaquín. Her children later married and had children of their own, among them Colombian politician and poet Adolfo León Gómez.

=== Death ===
In the final years of her life, Acevedo resided in her daughter Rosa's home in the countryside. She died there on 19 January 1861 and was buried in the nearby town of Pasca, Cundinamarca.

== Published works ==
=== Essays ===
Tratado sobre economía doméstica para el uso de las madres de familia i de las amas de casa (1848, José A. Cualla)

Ensayo sobre los deberes de los casados (1857, F. Torres Amaya); earlier editions published anonymously

=== Biographies ===
- Biografía del General José Acevedo Tejada, with Alfonso Acevedo (1850, León Echeverría)
- Biografía del doctor Diego Fernando Gómez (1854, F. Torres Amaya)
- Recuerdos nacionales: José Acevedo y Gómez (1860, Pizano y Pérez)
- Biografía de Vicente Azuero (n.d.)
- Biografía de Luis Vargas Tejada (n.d.)

=== Poetry collections ===
Oráculo de las flores y las frutas, acomodado a su lenguaje i con doce respuestas en verso (1856, F. Torres Amaya)

Poesías de una Granadina (1854, Anselmo León)

=== Short stories ===
Cuadros de la vida privada de algunos granadinos (1861, El Mosaico)

== Recognition ==
Poems by Acevedo were included in Poetisas americanas, an 1896 anthology of verse by noted female poets of the Americas.
