= Tomás Vargas Osorio =

Colombian poet

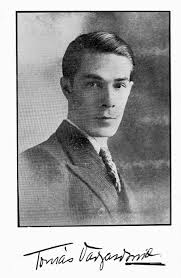
Tomás Vargas Osorio

Tomás Vargas Osorio (1908–1941) was a Colombian poet, often associated with the piedracielismo movement. He was born in Oiba, Santander and died of cancer at the age of 33, just one year after publishing a major work Regreso de la muerte.

Despite dying young, he was a prolific writer, publishing, in addition to poetry, short stories and essays. He also worked as a journalist for various newspapers. He also held political positions; he was a deputy for Santander in 1937 and two years later he held a seat in the House of Representatives. That same year, 1939, he founded and directed the newspaper El Día.

The Premio Nacional de Poesía Tomás Vargas Osorio was founded in his memory in 2016. He is also the subject of a RTVC documentary, titled Una tierra seca, sin nombre.
