= Germán Espinosa =

- Born: April 30, 1938; Cartagena, Colombia
- Died: October 17, 2007 (aged 69); Cartagena
- Occupations: Novelist, poet and author
- Writing career
- Genre: Historical fiction
- Subjects: Witches, pirates and the Spanish Inquisition
- Notable work: La Tejedora de Coronas

Germán Espinosa Villareal (April 30, 1938 – October 17, 2007) was a Colombian novelist, poet and author born and based in Cartagena, Colombia. He wrote over forty works over the course of his career. He often used his native Cartagena for the backdrop or inspiration for his writings. His historical fiction writings featured such diverse topics as witches, pirates and the Spanish Inquisition.

Espinosa was often called "Gabo sin Nobel," or "Garcia Marquez without the Nobel" in English. The quote referred to fellow Colombian writer, Gabriel García Márquez, who won the Nobel Prize for Literature in 1982.

Espinosa was best known for his 1982 novel "La Tejedora de Coronas" (The Weaver of Crowns). which focuses on the main character, Genoveva Alcocer, and is set in 17th century Cartagena.

Espinosa once called the city of Cartagena a "city of legends." "Perhaps the legends that arose in my city were the product of the inactivity of the people, since, for so long, almost the entire 19th century . . . there was nothing much to do other than invent, speak, read and remember."

His books are a real milestone for Colombian and American Literature. Some of his novels are "La Balada del Pajarillo" (the Ballad of the little bird), "Cuando Besan las Sombras" (When shadows kiss), "El Signo del Pez" (The Sign of the Fish) and "Aitana", dedicated to his deceased wife, Josefina. He also wrote several books of short stories.

Germán Espinosa died of cancer on October 17, 2007, in Cartagena at the age of 69.
