= List of Colombian writers =

This List of Colombian writers is an alphabetical list of writers born or brought up in Colombia, who already have Wikipedia pages in the English or Spanish Wikipedia. References for information given in the list appear on the Wikipedia pages concerned. This is a subsidiary list to the List of Colombian people. The list is far from exhaustive, so please help to expand it by adding Wikipedia page-owning published writers who have written in any genre or field, including science and scholarship, but does not include those whose sole body of work lies outside conventional published literature such as: print journalists, bloggers, editors, librettists, lyricists, songwriters, playwrights, or screenwriters. Please follow the entry format: use Spanish naming customs by listing both surnames of the person, use italics for authors who are best known under a pseudonym, indicate only the year of birth or the years of birth and death, and do not include place of birth or works associated with the writer, as that information should be found in their actual page.

== A ==
- Héctor Abad Faciolince (born 1958)
- Guillermo Abadía Morales (1912–2010)
- María Josefa Acevedo Sánchez (1803–1861)
- Soledad Acosta Kemble (1833–1913)
- Tomás Joaquín de Acosta y Pérez de Guzmán (1800–1852)
- Isabel Agatón Santander (born 1969)
- Juan Álvarez (born 1978)
- Gustavo Álvarez Gardeazábal (born 1945)
- Manuel Ancízar Basterra (1812–1882)
- Manuel de Jesús Andrade Suárez (1860–1935)
- Albalucía Ángel Marulanda (born 1939)
- Dorila Antommarchi García (1850s–1923)
- Hortensia Antommarchi García (1850–1915)
- Elmira Antommarchi García (1850s–1917)
- Samael Aun Weor (1917–1977)
- Gonzalo Arango Arias (1931–1976)
- Helena Araújo Ortiz (1934–2015)
- Consuelo Araújo Noguera (1940–2001)
- Julio Arboleda Pombo (1817–1862)

== B ==
- Luisa Ballesteros Rosas (born 1957)
- Porfirio Barba-Jacob (1883–1942)
- Luis Carlos Barragán (born 1988)
- Ángela Becerra Acevedo (born 1957)
- Belisario Betancur Cuartas (1923–2018)
- Gustavo Bolívar Moreno (born 1966)
- Piedad Bonnett Vélez (born 1951)
- Paul Brito (born 1975)
- Fanny Buitrago González (born 1943)

== C ==
- Eduardo Caballero Calderón (1910–1993)
- Andrés Caicedo Estela (1951–1977)
- Humberto de la Calle Lombana (born 1946)
- Hernando Calvo Ospina (born 1961)
- James Cañón (born 1968)
- Tomás Carrasquilla Naranjo (1858–1940)
- Juan de Castellanos Sánchez (1522–1607)
- Elizabeth Castillo Vargas (born 1970)
- Francisca Josefa de Castillo y Guevara (1671–1742)
- Germán Castro Caycedo (1940–2021)
- Álvaro Cepeda Samudio (1926–1972)
- Santiago Cepeda (born 1986)
- Eduardo Cote Lamus (1928–1964)
- Rufino José Cuervo Urisarri (1844–1911)

== D ==
- Fernando Denis (born 1968)

== E ==
- Orlando Echeverri Benedetti (born 1980)
- Octavio Escobar Giraldo (born 1962)
- Germán Espinosa Villareal (1938–2007)

== F ==
- José Fernández Madrid (1789–1830)
- Jorge Franco Ramos (born 1972)

== G ==
- Isaías Gamboa Herrera (1872–1902)
- Santiago Gamboa Samper (born 1965)
- Gabriel García Márquez (1927–2014)
- Jorge García Usta (1960–2005)
- Efe Gómez (1867–1938)
- Adolfo León Gómez Acevedo (1857–1927)
- Nicolás Gómez Dávila (1913–1994)
- Pedro Gómez Valderrama (1923–1992)
- Camilo González Posso (born 1947)
- Juan Gossaín Abdallah (born 1949)
- León de Greiff Haeusler (1895–1976)
- Gregorio Gutiérrez González (1826–1872)

== I ==
- Alfredo Iriarte Núñez (1932–2002)
- Jorge Isaacs Ferrer (1837–1895)

== J ==
- Hugo Jamioy Juagibioy (born 1971)

== L ==
- Mario Laserna Pinzón (1923–2013)
- Eduardo Lemaitre Román (1914–1994)
- Indalecio Liévano Aguirre (1917–1982)
- Fernando Londoño Hoyos (born 1944)
- Luis López Gómez (1884–1967)
- Orietta Lozano (born 1956)

== M ==
- Jaime Manrique Ardila (born 1949)
- Floralba Uribe Marín (1943–2005)
- Jose Manuel Marroquin Ricaurte (1827–1908)
- Olga Elena Mattei Echavarría (born 1933)
- Pedro Medina Avendaño (1915–2012)
- Efraim Medina Reyes (born 1967)
- Epifanio Mejía Quijano (1838–1913)
- Orlando Mejía Rivera (born 1961)
- Manuel Mejía Vallejo (1923–1998)
- Marvel Moreno (1939-1995)
- Álvaro Mutis Jaramillo (1923–2013)

== N ==
- Antonio Nariño y Álvarez (1765–1824)
- Juan José Nieto Gil (1805–1866)
- Rafael Núñez Moledo (1825–1894)

== O ==
- William Ospina Buitrago (born 1954)

== P ==
- Enrique Pardo Farelo (1883–1965)
- Santiago Pérez de Manosalbas (1830–1900)
- Oscar Perdomo Gamboa (born 1974)
- Juan Pablo Plata Figueroa (born 1982)
- Rafael Pombo y Rebolledo (1833–1912)
- Fernando Ponce de León Paris (1917–1998)

== R ==
- Laura Restrepo González (born 1950)
- Luis Carlos Restrepo Ramírez (born 1954)
- Zacarías Reyán (born 1948)
- José Eustasio Rivera Salas (1888–1928)
- Héctor Rojas Herazo (1920–2002)
- Teresa Román Vélez (1925–2021)
- Amira de la Rosa (1895–1974)
- Evelio Rosero Diago (born 1958)

== S ==
- Bertilda Samper Acosta (1856–1910)
- Agripina Samper Agudelo (1833–1892)
- José María Samper Agudelo (1856–1910)
- Miguel Samper Agudelo (1825–1899)
- Daniel Samper Pizano (born 1945)
- David Sánchez Juliao (1945–2011)
- Baldomero Sanín Cano (1861–1957)
- Germán Santa María Barragán (born 1950)
- José Asunción Silva Gómez (1865–1896)
- Carmelina Soto Valencia (1916–1994)
- Fernando Soto Aparicio (1933–2016)

== T ==
- Consuelo Triviño Anzola (born 1956)
- Anabel Torres Restrepo (born 1948)
- Camilo Torres Tenorio (1766–1816)
- Manuel Trujillo Torres (1762–1822)

== U ==
- Manuel Uribe Ángel (1822–1904)
- Hernando Urriago Benítez (born 1974)

== V ==
- Guillermo Valencia Castillo (1873–1943)
- Virginia Vallejo García (born 1949)
- Fernando Vallejo Rendón (born 1942)
- José María Vargas Bonilla (1860–1933)
- Francisco Javier Vergara y Velasco (1860–1914)
- José María Vergara y Vergara (1831–1872)
- Eladio Vergara y Vergara (1821-1888)
- Luis Vidales Jaramillo (1900–1990)
- Juan Gabriel Vásquez (born 1973)

== Z ==
- Jorge Zalamea Borda (1905–1969)
- Alberto Zalamea Costa (1929–2011)
- Manuel Zapata Olivella (1920–2004)
- Francisco Antonio Zea Díaz (1766–1822)

== See also ==
- Colombian literature
- List of Latin American writers
- David Bushnell
