= List of Colombian women writers =

This is a list of women writers who were born in Colombia or whose writings are closely associated with that country.

== A ==
- María Josefa Acevedo Sánchez (1803–1861), non-fiction writer, poet, biographer
- Soledad Acosta (1833–1913), novelist, short story writer, journalist
- Albalucía Ángel (born 1939), novelist, folksinger
- Dorila Antommarchi (c.1850–1923), poet, one of three sisters
- Elmira Antommarchi (19th century), poet
- Hortensia Antommarchi (1850–1915), poet
- Consuelo Araújo (1940–2001), journalist, non-fiction writer, short story writer
- Helena Araújo (1934–2015), literary critic, short story writer, novelist

== B ==
- Luisa Ballesteros Rosas (born 1957), essayist, poet, and educator
- Ángela Becerra (born 1957), novelist
- Piedad Bonnett (born 1951), poet, playwright, novelist
- Fanny Buitrago (born 1943), novelist, playwright
- Isabel Bunch de Cortés (1845–1921), poet, translator

== D ==
- Margarita Diez-Colunje y Pombo (1838–1919), historian, translator, genealogist

== F ==
- Francisca Josefa de la Concepción (1671–1742), nun, autobiographer

== H ==
- Bertha Hernández Fernández (1907–1993), first lady of Colombia, non-fiction writer, works on gardening

== K ==
- Leszli Kálli, kidnapped in 1999, diarist

== L ==
- Magdalena León de Leal (born 1939), feminist writer
- Orietta Lozano (born 1956), poet

== M ==
- Ana María Martínez de Nisser (1812–1872), historical writer
- Olga Elena Mattei (born 1933), poet
- Marvel Moreno (1939–1995), writer, novelist

== N ==
- Jerónima Nava y Saavedra (1669–1727), writer and Catholic religious

== O ==
- Cecilia Orozco Tascón, contemporary journalist

== P ==
- Lucrecia Panchano (born c. 1940), poet

== R ==
- Laura Restrepo (born 1950), journalist, novelist
- Teresa Román Vélez (1925–2021), cookbook writer
- Amira de la Rosa (1895–1974), playwright, poet, journalist, and writer
- María Teresa Ronderos (born 1959), journalist, columnist, non-fiction writer

== S ==
- Bertilda Samper Acosta (1856–1910), nun, poet
- Agripina Samper Agudelo (1833–1892), poet
- Carmelina Soto (1916–1994), acclaimed poet

== T ==
- Anabel Torres (born 1948), poet, translator
- Consuelo Triviño Anzola (born 1956), narradora

== U ==
- Ofelia Uribe de Acosta (1900–1988), suffragist, journalist, newspaper editor

== V ==
- Virginia Vallejo (born 1949), novelist, journalist, television presenter

== See also ==
- List of Colombian writers
- List of women writers
- List of Spanish-language authors
