= Antommarchi =

Antommarchi may refer to:

== People ==
- François Carlo Antommarchi (1780-1838), Napoleon's physician in his exile
- Hortensia Antommarchi (1850-1915), Colombian poet, sister to Dorila & Elmira
- Dorila Antommarchi (1853-1923), Colombian poet, sister to Hortensia & Elmira
- Elmira Antommarchi (c.1850s-?), Colombian poet, sister to Hortensia & Dorila

== Law ==
- Antommarchi Rights
