= Alejandro Corrales Escobar =

Colombian politician

Alejandro Corrales

Senator of the Republic of Colombia
- In office July 20, 2018 – July 20, 2022

Personal details
- Born: Alejandro Corrales Escobar; 18 March 1976 (age 49); Belén de Umbría, Colombia
- Political party: Democratic Center
- Education: University of Caldas
- Occupation: Politician, agricultural engineer

Alejandro Corrales Escobar (born March 18, 1976, Belén de Umbría, Colombia) is a Colombian engineer and politician, who served as Senator of the Republic of Colombia.

== Biography ==
A member of a family of coffee growers, he studied agricultural engineering at the University of Caldas.

He was a member of the Departmental Committee of Coffee Growers of Risaralda between 2010 and 2014, to later become president of the board of directors of the Departmental Cooperative of Coffee Growers of Risaralda, between 2010 and 2017. He was also a member of the National Committee of the National Federation of Coffee Growers representing Risaralda, between 2014 and 2017.

He was elected in the 2018 legislative elections as Senator with the endorsement of the Democratic Center Party.

He tried to be reelected in the 2022 legislative elections, but failed. In the Senate, he was part of Commission V. He was one of the main proponents of one of the projects to ban fracking in Colombia.
