= Lyda (given name) =

Feminine given name

Lyda is a female given name. It may be a variant of "Lydia" or of the name "Leda."

== Notable people ==
- Lyda Borelli
- Lyda Conley
- Lyda Green
- Lyda Hill
- Lyda Krewson
- Lyda Moore Merrick
- Lyda Morehouse
- Lyda D. Newman
- Lyda Osorio
- Lyda Roberti
- Lyda Salmonova
- Lyda Southard
- Lyda Ann Thomas
- Lyda Verstegen
