= Raimundinho =

Brazilian footballer

Personal information
- Full name: Raimundo Ferreira Silva
- Date of birth: 28 February 1933
- Place of birth: São José da Varginha , Brazil
- Date of death: 29 April 2000 (aged 67)
- Place of death: Belo Horizonte, Brazil
- Height: 1.68 m (5 ft 6 in)
- Position: Forward

Youth career
- Cachoeirinha (Belo Horizonte)

Senior career*
Years	Team	Apps	(Gls)
1952–1963	Cruzeiro	323	(112)
1958	→ America-RJ (loan)		
1962	→ Universidad Central (VEN)		
1963–1964	Renascença		

Managerial career
- 1977–1978: Treze
- * Club domestic league appearances and goals as of 11 March 2024

Raimundo Ferreira Silva (28 February 1933 – 29 April 2000), better known as Raimundinho, was a Brazilian professional footballer and manager, who played as a forward.

== Career ==
Raimundinho began his career at Cachoeirinha de Belo Horizonte in 1951, still as a youth player. He arrived at Cruzeiro in 1952 where he played almost his entire career, with 323 games and 112 goals, being top scorer in 1954 and state champion in 1956, 1959, and 1960. He was sidelined due to illness in 1957, being loaned to America-RJ in 1958 to regain rhythm. He ended his career as a player at EC Renascença and had a brief role as coach at Treze da Paraíba.

Raimundinho was inducted into the Cruzeiro EC Hall of Fame in 2012.

== Honours ==
Cruzeiro

- Campeonato Mineiro: 1956, 1959, 1960
- Copa Belo Horizonte: 1960

Individual

- 1954 Campeonato Mineiro top scorer: 13 goals
