= Orietta =

Orietta is an Italian given name. Notable people with the name include:

- Orietta Berti (born 1943), Italian singer
- Orietta Calliari (born 1969), Italian ski mountaineer
- Orietta Grossi (1959–2024), Italian basketball player
- Orietta Lozano (born 1956), Colombian poet
- Orietta Mancia (born 1968), Italian long-distance runner
- Orietta Patron, Italian swimmer at the 1989 European Aquatics Championships
