= Opio en las nubes (novel) =

1992 novel by Colombian author Rafael Chaparro Madiedo

- Author: Rafael Chaparro Madiedo
- Language: Spanish
- Genre: Novel
- Publisher: Babilonia
- Publication date: 1992
- Awards: National Literature Prize (1992)

Opio en las nubes (Opium in the Clouds) is a novel by Colombian writer Rafael Chaparro Madiedo, originally published in 1992. The work won the Colombian National Novel Award that same year and was subsequently republished in 1999 by Editorial Babilonia.

The novel is part of the so-called "Post-Boom" of Colombian literature. Critics often compare it to works of the American Beat Generation or the Onda literature in Mexico, primarily due to its explicit exploration of themes such as excess, drugs, urban nightlife, and the strong influence of rock music.

== Plot and structure ==
The story is set in a fictional city that evokes Bogotá, but reimagined with surrealist elements such as the presence of the sea and an environment crisscrossed by underground bars, hippodromes, and parks. In its final stretch, this city suffers an apocalyptic destruction described through aerial attacks ("the black fishes") and clouds of ash.

The narrative is divided into eighteen chapters with a fragmentary structure, built from streams of consciousness and intense sensory perceptions (smells, colors, and sounds). The main narrative axes intertwine the lives of various marginalized characters: the intermittent and toxic romance between Sven and Amarilla, narrated from their perspectives and that of their cat Pink Tomate; the life of Max, from his birth in prison alongside murderer Gary Gilmour to his adulthood working in a dairy; and Marciana's mental collapse.

The boundaries between life and death are completely blurred in the text: characters who die violently continue to narrate or wander the city interacting with the living, experiencing the same decadence and existential void that governs their world.

== Literary style and rhythm ==
The novel stands out for its formal and linguistic experimentation. In Opio en las nubes, the narrative adopts a psychedelic speed analyzed under the concept of "prosaic rhythm". Chaparro Madiedo appropriates rhythmic rudiments typically reserved for poetry (verse) and rock music (choruses and verbal riffs), bringing them into prose.

Through the abundant use of repetition-based rhetorical figures—such as anaphoras, epiphoras, chaotic enumerations, and pluri-membrations—he simulates a cadence that reflects the effects of hallucination, the consumption of alcohol and narcotics, and the noise of the city. The novel is structurally monophonic, as all characters employ the same system of metaphors and leitmotifs (such as the repetitive filler words "trip trip trip" or "todo bien").

== Themes ==
One axis analyzed by critics is animal abjection and social transgression. Immersed in a postmodern state of ideological lack, the human characters establish strong bonds with animals (the cat Pink Tomate, the dog Marta, pigeons, or zoo animals like the elephant Dick or the lion Mercury). These creatures participate in the same decadent environment; concurrently, animals like the narrator Pink Tomate adopt human behaviors such as alcoholism or desire, challenging anthropocentrism.

== Main characters ==
Character	Description
Pink Tomate	A rescued stray cat, Amarilla's pet, who acts as the narrator for several chapters. He rambles about his identity (not knowing if he is a tomato or a cat), loves the smell of vodka and flowers, and finishes almost all his sentences with the catchphrase "trip trip trip".
Amarilla	Pink Tomate's owner and Sven's partner. She is a young woman immersed in bohemian life, alcohol, and drugs, who works sporadically as a translator. At the end of her narrative arc, she abandons the city, going into the sea aboard a small white boat.
Sven	Intradiegetic narrator. He dies violently in a confusing manner (not knowing if he was shot, injected, or beaten), but his spirit continues to inhabit the ruined city. He has an intermittent relationship with Amarilla.
Gary Gilmour	An orphan and inmate condemned to the electric chair after beating a woman named Porfiria to death using a Pete Rose baseball. He befriends young Max in prison.
Max	Born and raised in cell 56 of the prison. He dedicates himself to feeding pigeons with packaged soup. He works delivering milk in a red Ford and maintains a peculiar relationship with Marciana.
Marciana	A dancer who frequents bars and ends up committed to a sanatorium after suffering a mental breakdown during a horse race. She becomes obsessed with writing poems on walls, mirrors, and in the sky using red lipstick.
Lerner	A shy cat belonging to Old Job. He accompanies Pink Tomate on his walks across the rooftops and tends to always agree with him.
Altagracia	An enigmatic woman who, after inviting a lover to dinner and having sex on the table, shoots him twice, hides the corpse in a coffin under the tablecloth, and immediately calls the next guest.
Old Job	Amarilla's elderly neighbor and Lerner's owner. He enjoys smelling Amarilla's shampoo and brings her coffee with brandy. He dies at the beginning of the novel.
Daisy	A character of ambiguous identity ("didn't know if he was a man, woman, donkey, or elephant") who wears scandalous outfits and works as a prostitute. They work delivering milk with Max and participate in a bank robbery.
Highway 34	Lost his mind when he stopped his car in the middle of Highway 34 and set it on fire in front of his family. In the sanatorium, he wears clothes made from chocolate wrappers and ends up escaping with Marciana to paint the highway lines with lipstick.
Monroe	A prison guard who acts as a father figure to Max. He takes Max and his mother to the beach on Fridays. When he dies, he is buried next to Gary Gilmour.
Laurencio	Another of the cats living with Amarilla, mentioned during the trip to the movies.
PielRoja	Max's mother. Imprisoned for murdering her husband by drowning him with lettuce, beets, and spinach.
La Babosa	The driver of the dairy truck where Max and Daisy work. He plans a bank robbery, is kicked out of the gang after an altercation, and later turns up dead with a gunshot to the back of the neck.
Oliver	Works in a bookstore and attends the parties. During the dog Marta's birthday, he murders her by slitting her open with a bread knife.
Marta	Alain's Old English Sheepdog, described with a "mongoloid" appearance, fond of drinking vodka. Her murder marks the end of the parties on Blanchot Avenue.
Alain	Owner of the bar Cosa Divina. He always wears a tropical floral shirt and often organizes chaotic parties in his apartment. The death of his dog Marta plunges him into a depressive confinement.

== Chapters ==
No.	Chapter	Description
1	Pink Tomate	Introduces the narrator cat and the chaotic life of his owner Amarilla, marked by hangovers, alcohol, fights with Sven, and the death of their neighbor, Old Job.
2	An ambulance with whiskey	Sven narrates his own violent death and his ride in an ambulance (where he falls in love with the nurse). He wakes up as a specter in an apocalyptic city and strikes up a friendship with Max in Captain Nirvana's Cafe.
3	One little drool, two little drools	Tells the tragic story of Daisy, an androgynous character who works as a prostitute, survives brutal torture on the street, and has as their only friend a zoo elephant who tries to strangle them.
4	Gary Gilmour's eyes	Narrates Max's childhood in prison alongside his mother PielRoja and his friendship with Gary Gilmour, an inmate condemned to the electric chair who leaves him a Pete Rose baseball.
5	Marilyn's breath	Sven remembers the day he met Amarilla at the hippodrome and recalls his childhood days in a treehouse, reading Swedish magazines with his friends until they decide to set the hideout on fire.
6	Rain trip trip trip	Pink Tomate and the cat Lerner observe from a rooftop how their neighbor Altagracia has dinner with a lover, shoots him dead, hides him in a coffin under the table, and immediately calls the next one.
7	Guardian angel	Gary Gilmour's ghost visits Max and Sven at the boardwalk bar. It recounts the release of Max and his mother from prison, and how Max ends up working as a milk delivery boy alongside Daisy and La Babosa.
8	Helga the fiery beast of the snows	Sven and Max play baseball on the beach. Sven delves into his childhood memories, his fixation with Scandinavian magazine models, and the process of maturing through boredom.
9	Opium in the clouds	Gary Gilmour recounts his obsession with Harlem, a dancer from the Opium Strip Tease bar. After telling her about his strange connection with trees and being rejected, Gary walks into the sea to disappear.
10	The dirty Monday morning	Pink Tomate describes the gloomy, chaotic, and violent nightlife of the city's bars, detailing the destructive dynamics of places like La Gallina Punk and El Acuario Nuclear.
11	Black coffee for the pigeons	Max meets the dancer Marciana. The wild parties at Alain's apartment are recounted, which end tragically when Oliver stabs the host's dog, Marta, to death.
12	DC-3 May spinach	Sven and Amarilla visit a bizarre amusement park. They then take a taxi to the airport at dawn to get drunk, watch the planes, and make love on the edge of the runway.
13	Alabimbombao	Recounts the love triangle and tragic fate of three young people: Carolo (who commits suicide with gunpowder), El Loco (who dies in a motorcycle accident), and Susy (who leaves the country and goes to the United States).
14	The days smelled of diesel with peach	Marciana, committed to a sanatorium, forms a close relationship with Highway 34, a madman obsessed with cars. The two escape in a truck to paint the highways with red lipstick.
15	A small logic	Pink Tomate presents his feline philosophy for surviving on the streets in a fragmentary way, basing his perception of the world on the effects of whiskey, vodka, and beer.
16	Restricted little skies	A poetic interlude presenting a series of erratic and intense verses written by Marciana with lipstick on the highway asphalt, directed at her companion Highway 34.
17	Route 34 to Meissen	Sven and Amarilla travel through the city at dawn in a city bus that is hijacked by an armed man. In the end, Amarilla leaves the city in a white boat and Sven witnesses the apocalyptic bombing by the black fishes.
18	Giraffes with milk	Through Alain's personal diary, his last days of confinement and deep depression after the death of his dog Marta are narrated, culminating in his definitive departure from the city on the subway.

== See also ==
- Colombian literature
