= Heinz Goll =

Austrian artist (1934–1999)

- Born: Hannes Heinz Goll; 31 August 1934; Klagenfurt, Austria
- Died: 27 January 1999 (aged 64); Sibaté, Colombia
- Known for: sculpture, printmaking, painting

Hannes Heinz Goll (31 August 1934 – 27 January 1999) was an Austrian sculptor, printmaker and painter. He worked predominantly in Colombia.

== Life and work ==
Goll was the son of Johanna and Rudolf Goll, an upper-middle-class family with three children from Klagenfurt. He was considered an enfant terrible of the Austrian art scene in the 1960s, was co-founder of the "Grüne Galerie" (green gallery) in his hometown in 1964, and established the art collective of Mieger in 1970. He also established a rehabilitation workshop for drug addicted adolescents in Carinthia, and treated them with a self-developed art therapy, before he moved to Caracas in the mid 1970s, where he founded a further rehabilitation group.

A few years later he moved to Colombia, where he met his future wife, the psychologist Piedad Tamayo in Sibaté, and settled down to live. In his works he was inspired by pre-Columbian symbolism and Indigenous arts. In many of his works, especially in his nude madonna works, he combined sacred and erotic items. Other topics of his work include: chained indigenous people, people on the run and politically displaced persons of Colombia. Shortly before Goll exhibited in his hometown in the end of 1998, physicians diagnosed that he was suffering from leukemia and hepatitis C. A few days later he died in the hospital of Sibaté near Bogotá, the town where he is buried.

=== Notable works ===
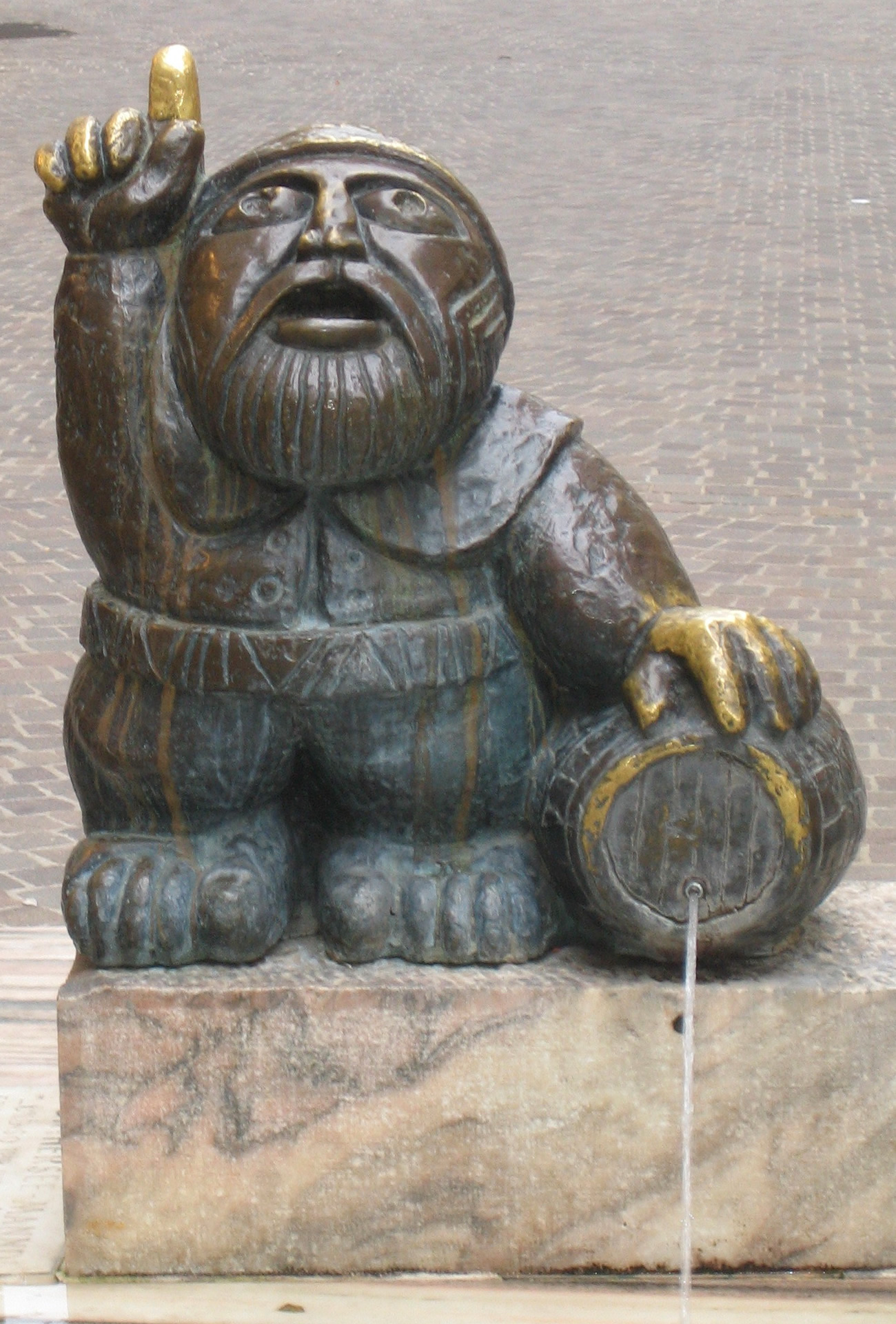
"Wörthersee midget"

- "Wörthersee-Mandl", Klagenfurt, 1962
- "Das letzte Abendmahl" (The Last Supper), 1976, 7 bronze plaques
- Heinz Pototschnig's Nachtkupfer (illustration work)
- Jesus Christ, plaque in the Christ-König church, Krumpendorf

=== Exhibitions ===
- Klagenfurt "Stadthaus" (town house), December 1999-January 2000 (posthumous)
- "Haus Grünspan", Mühlboden/Feffernitz (Paternion), 2009 (posthumous)

== Literature ==
- Woschitz, Mejía Rivera, Rojas Herazo: Heinz Goll - 1934-1999. Sein Leben, sein Werk, 2001 ISBN 978-3-85013-877-2
