= Paul Brito =

Colombian writer (born 1975)

- Born: October 21, 1975 (age 51); Barranquilla, Colombia
- Education: Universidad Autónoma del Caribe (industrial engineering); University of Atlántico (master's degree in philosophy)
- Occupations: Writer, editor, journalist, professor
- Parents: Fabio Canario Brito; Marina Ramos Roca

Paul Brito (born October 21, 1975) is a Colombian writer, editor, journalist and professor from Barranquilla. His work includes books of short stories, microfiction, crónicas, novels and essays.

An industrial engineer by training with a master's degree in philosophy, he lived in Barcelona, where he founded a newspaper, and was the editor of the magazine Actual in Barranquilla.

His short-story collection Los intrusos won the National Short Story Collection Competition of the Industrial University of Santander, and El proletariado de los dioses was nominated for the Premio Biblioteca de Narrativa Colombiana in 2016.

== Biography ==
=== Early life and education ===
Paul Fabián Brito Ramos was born in Barranquilla on October 21, 1975. His father, Fabio Canario Brito, was from Tazacorte, on the Canary island of La Palma, and worked as a radio announcer and commentator, according to the writer; Brito has also said that his father emigrated from the Canary Islands by way of Venezuela. In a review published in El Espectador, Juan Carlos Guardela Vásquez describes him as a former soccer player and says he died young. His mother, Marina Ramos Roca, was from Sabanalarga, in Atlántico, and taught elementary school for 46 years; she died of Parkinson's disease.

Brito studied industrial engineering at the Universidad Autónoma del Caribe and took a postgraduate course in publishing at the Open University of Catalonia. He holds a master's degree in philosophy from the University of Atlántico. He won the second and third short-story contests of the Universidad Autónoma del Caribe (1995 and 1996) and its second poetry contest (1997), and was a finalist for the 13th Max Aub International Short Story Prize in Segorbe (1999).

=== Journalism and editing ===
In 2003 he founded the print newspaper Mundo Hispano in Barcelona with Felipe Villa; it received the 2007–2008 Premio Galatina for best specialized publication, and he was its cultural editor and a columnist. He has published in El Tiempo, Arcadia, El Heraldo and El Malpensante, in the Barcelona magazines Lateral, El Ciervo and Animal Sospechoso and, for 20 years, in the Oviedo magazine Clarín.

For ten years he edited the magazine Actual in Barranquilla. He was a rapporteur for the Gabriel García Márquez Foundation for New Ibero-American Journalism at Jon Lee Anderson's crónica workshop "La Barranquilla de García Márquez".

=== Teaching ===
He teaches in the master's program in creative writing at the Universidad Central in Bogotá and on the journalism and literature module at the Universidad del Norte in Barranquilla, and also teaches a literary workshop for the Instituto Distrital de las Artes.

== Writing ==
Brito began as a short-story writer and, as he has explained, all his texts have "the core form of a short story" and his books "the modular form of interlocking stories", including his crónicas and essays. He says that one idea runs through all his genres, and he calls it, "playfully", the theory of continuity. In interviews he has named continuity and sequence as the two dimensions present in all his work.

=== Short stories ===
His first book, Los intrusos (2008), collects stories based on the author's own experiences or on accounts he heard from family and friends. The book turns on an idea the author has described this way: every narrative contains an intruder who sets off its action and its conflicts. It was one of the winning works of the third National Short Story Collection Competition of the Industrial University of Santander, which the university itself dates to 2007; Radio Nacional de Colombia and the Fundación Cultural Esteros place the prize in 2008. The book was reissued by Pluma de Mompox in 2010 and by the Canadian publisher Lugar Común in 2019.

In 2005 he won first place in the 15th Noble Villa de Portugalete International Short Story Competition, in Biscay. His writing has been partly translated into Italian, Portuguese, German, French and Bengali, and in full into English by Jonathan Tittler. Brito appears in anthologies such as Asedios verbales, panorama actual del cuento colombiano, published by Pijao Editores.

=== Microfiction ===
El ideal de Aquiles, 101 pasos para alcanzar a la tortuga was published by Hadriaticus Editores in 2010, reissued by Planeta Lector in 2017 and translated into Bengali by Razu Alauddin in 2019. The book starts from an aporia of Zeno of Elea and collects 101 short texts that move between the narrative, the poetic and the philosophical. Pijao Editores and El Espectador give it a different subtitle, "101 minicuentos para alcanzar a la tortuga".

=== Novels ===
La muerte del obrero (2014), whose protagonist is Fabián Roca, a young unemployed man, was a finalist in 2008 for the National Short Novel Competition of the Writers' Workshop of the Universidad Central. It appeared in the Caribe Adentro series of an independent publisher based in Bogotá. Presenting it in 2015, Brito explained that it had begun as a novel, but that the chapters "kept turning out to be stories that opened and closed", so he chose to call it a collection of stories and let readers decide whether it was also a novel. In 2024 he referred to it as his first novel and said he rewrote it over ten years because he was not satisfied with the result. In 2023 an alliance of four university presses reissued it; the review on Emma Claus's website lists a 2024 edition.

Restos orgánicos de un mundo anterior (Seix Barral, 2020) is an autobiographical novel, narrated in the third person, about the life of the author's mother and her Parkinson's disease. It was launched on August 24, 2020. Its protagonist is called Pe; according to the author, the character is above all a narrative and emotional strategy, and perhaps the book's only fictional license. Brito has said that he held himself to what really happened and that the book contains "not a single word of fiction". He says that to write it he consulted family and friends, searched newspaper archives, interviewed neurologists and traveled to Pereira to research his father's time with the city's soccer team. The title comes from the phrase James Parkinson used for fossils. A preliminary version, Árbol de levas, won the 2018 Portafolio Distrital de Estímulos de Novela in Barranquilla.

=== Crónicas ===
El proletariado de los dioses (Collage Editores, 2016) collects 14 crónicas that Brito had published in outlets such as El Tiempo, Carrusel, El Heraldo, Clarín and El Malpensante. The book has two parts: one of personal crónicas and another devoted to trades such as watchmaker, goldsmith or guacharaca player. Its title alludes to a sentence by Albert Camus in The Myth of Sisyphus; that sentence is also the book's epigraph.

According to the biographical note in SmokeLong Quarterly, it was the only book of crónicas nominated for the Premio Biblioteca de Narrativa Colombiana (EAFIT) in 2016. The Editorial Universidad del Norte describes it as a finalist for that prize, and Pijao Editores as the only book of literary crónicas nominated for the "III Premio de Narrativa Eafit al Mejor Libro del Año" in 2016. In 2024 CLU Editores published an expanded edition. In 2017 Brito won the Premio Distrital de Crónica of Barranquilla.

=== Essays ===
La vida no es un ensayo (Luna Libros, 2022) is a book of essays that, according to Orlando Oliveros Acosta, brings together very different articles with a single protagonist: the art of continuity. The Editorial Universidad del Norte is also listed as co-publisher. The book includes essays on Gabriel García Márquez, Franz Kafka and Julio Cortázar, and a section on sports in which Brito writes about Lionel Messi, Diego Maradona and Usain Bolt. Its epigraph is a quotation from Augusto Monterroso.

== Awards and honors ==
- 1995 and 1996: second and third short-story contests of the Universidad Autónoma del Caribe.
- 1997: second poetry contest of the Universidad Autónoma del Caribe.
- 1999: finalist, 13th Max Aub International Short Story Prize, Segorbe.
- 2005: first place, 15th Noble Villa de Portugalete International Short Story Competition.
- 2007: third National Short Story Collection Competition of the Industrial University of Santander, for Los intrusos.
- 2008: finalist, National Short Novel Competition of the Writers' Workshop of the Universidad Central, for La muerte del obrero.
- 2016: nominated for the Premio Biblioteca de Narrativa Colombiana, for El proletariado de los dioses.
- 2017: Premio Distrital de Crónica, Barranquilla.
- 2018: Portafolio Distrital de Estímulos de Novela, Barranquilla, for Árbol de levas.
- 2019: Portafolio Distrital de Estímulos de Libro de Cuentos, Barranquilla, for El dios de los deseos ajenos.
- 2020: grant for foreign writers in Uruguay, from the Esteros foundation.
- 2020: "Germán Vargas Cantillo" Portafolio de Estímulos, Barranquilla, for El bucle.
- 2024: "Marvel Moreno" district novel grant, Barranquilla, for La franja invisible.
- 2025: honorable mention, Michael Jacobs travel writing grant, Fundación Gabo.
- 2025: Premio Nacional de Novela Ciudad de Bogotá, for Las vidas que nos deben.
- 2025: creative grant in literature and oral narratives from the Ministry of Cultures, Arts and Knowledge, for América: la octava isla canaria.
- 2026: creative grant in literature and oral narratives from the Ministry of Cultures, Arts and Knowledge.

== Books ==
=== Novels ===
- La muerte del obrero, Collage Editores, 2014. ISBN 978-958-58415-8-1 / Alianza U (Eafit, Uninorte, Icesi and Cesa) (second edition), 2023, ISBN 9789587895629
- Restos orgánicos de un mundo anterior, Seix Barral, 2020. ISBN 978-958-42-8875-2 / Antonym Collection (translated into English by Jonathan Tittler), India, ISBN 978-0-99-702549-1

=== Short story collections ===
- Los intrusos, Ediciones UIS, 2008. ISBN 978-958-8187-85-3 / Pluma de Mompox (second edition), 2010, ISBN 978-958-8375-36-6 / Lugar Común (third edition), Canada and Mexico, 2019 / Klepsidra (fourth edition), 2025, ISBN 9786289686302

=== Microfiction ===
- El ideal de Aquiles, 101 pasos para alcanzar a la tortuga, Hadriaticus Editores, 2010. ISBN 978-958-44-6086-8 / Planeta Lector, 2017, ISBN 978-958-42-6149-6 / Baatighar Editions (translated into Bengali by Razu Alauddin), Bangladesh, 2019, ISBN 978-984-034187-0 / Planeta México, 2021, ISBN 978-607-07-8206-0

=== Crónicas ===
- El proletariado de los dioses, Collage Editores, 2016. ISBN 978-958-8900-29-2 / CLU Editores (second edition), 2024, ISBN 978-628-96201-7-7

=== Essays ===
- La vida no es un ensayo, Luna Libros, 2022. ISBN 978-958-888-739-5
- Ser y continuidad, University of Valle, 2025. ISBN 978-958-507-429-3

=== Anthologies ===
- Antología del cuento corto del Caribe colombiano Rubén Otálvaro, Fondo Editorial Universidad de Córdoba. 2008. ISBN 9789589244180
- Los comprimidos memorables del siglo XXI VI Congreso de Minificción, Universidad Nacional de Colombia and others. 2012. ISBN 978-958-719-586-6
- Cortázar Sampleado, 32 lecturas iberoamericanas Pablo Brescia, Editorial Libros Sampleados, Mexico. 2014. ISBN 978-6-07966-660-6
- Cuentos del Caribe. Álvaro Cepeda Samudio y otros doce autores Dora Piñeres de la Ossa and Emiro Santos García, Biblioteca Nacional de Colombia. 2014. ISBN 978-958-58828-6-7
- Gabito nuestro de cada día Álvaro Suescún, Collage Editores. 2015. ISBN 978-958-8900-07-0
- Doble E2: nuevos escritores del Caribe colombiano Luis Molina Lora and Julio César Pérez Méndez, Lugar Común Editorial. 2016. ISBN 978-1-987819-35-9
- Colección del cuento corto colombiano Guillermo Bustamante and Harold Kremer, Programa Editorial Universidad del Valle. 2016. ISBN 9789587652529
- Asedios verbales, panorama actual del cuento colombiano Ángel Castaño, Pijao Editores. 2017. ISBN 978-958-561-528-1
- Nosotros no iniciamos el fuego. Antología periodística sobre el conflicto colombiano y sus víctimas John Jairo Junieles, Ecoemprender Ediciones, Min-cultura. 2017. ISBN 978-958-564-090-0
- Los días de la pandemia Diana María Pachón. 2020. ISBN 9789584899552
- Cuentos y relatos de la literatura colombiana Fondo de Cultura Económica, 2021.
- La muerte tiene tos Daniel Ángel and Luis Felipe Mestre, Lugar Común. 2022. ISBN 978-1-990743-01-6
- Puñalada trapera 2 Juan Fernando Hincapié, Rey Naranjo. 2022. ISBN 9789585586956
- Planeta Diego, 16 miradas a un ícono Pablo Brescia, Planeta México. 2022. ISBN 9786075693477
