= Heinz Pototschnig =

Austrian physician and writer (1923–1995)

- Born: Heinrich Pototschnig; June 30, 1923; Graz, Austria
- Died: April 11, 1995 (aged 71); Villach, Austria
- Occupations: Physician, writer

Heinrich "Heinz" Pototschnig (June 30, 1923 – April 11, 1995) was an Austrian physician and writer.

== Early life, education and career ==
Pototschnig was born in Graz. After World War II and after he graduated in medicine, he moved to Carinthia, where he practised in Villach and started writing. His works include narratives, essays, lyric poetry and radio plays.

In 1962, he became editor of Der Bogen, which was edited by Hans Leb before.

In 1977, he participated in the first edition of the Ingeborg Bachmann Competition, Klagenfurt.

== Death ==
Pototschnig died in Villach.

== Honors ==
- Theodor Körner Prize, 1965 and 1971
- Peter Rosegger Prize, 1969
- Great golden decoration of Styria, 1984
- Cultural award of Villach, 1994

== Works ==
- Schatten schrägen ins Licht. Gedichte., 1961 (illustrated by Franz Schneeweiß)
- Nachtkupfer, 1962 (illustrated by Heinz Goll)
- Den Rest teilen die Sterne, 1963
- Lotungen. Lyrische Legende für Stimmen., 1965
- Die grünen Schnäbel - Zehn Geschichten über Kinder., 1970
- Die Grenze, 1974
- Die Wanderung, 1976
- Der Sommer mit den Enten, 1977
- Westdrift. Gedichte., 1990
- Aus Spiegeln keine Wiederkehr, 1991
- Sei Stein und allein, 1994
- Nach dem Abschied, 1997
