= Efraim Medina Reyes =

- Born: June 29, 1967 (age 58); Cartagena, Colombia
- Occupations: Novelist, poet, short story writer, columnist

Efraim Medina Reyes is a Colombian writer born June 29, 1967 in Cartagena, Colombia. He is also the bassist and composer of the 7 Torpes rock band, he currently lives between Colombia and Vicenza, Italy. He is influenced by American cinema, jazz music and works of Andrés Caicedo, an emblematic figure of contemporary Colombian literature. As a writer, Efraim Medina Reyes emphasizes the hectic life of urban youths. He uses narrative techniques such as collage.

Some of his works were translated and published in Italian by Feltrinelli, Portuguese by Planeta, French by 13e Note Editions and Finnish by Ivan Rotta & Co.

== Major works ==
- Cinema árbol y otros cuentos, short stories. (in Spanish)
- Érase una vez el amor pero tuve que matarlo, novel. (in Spanish)
- Técnicas de masturbación entre Batman y Robin, novel. (in Spanish)
- Sexualidad de la pantera rosa, novel. (in Spanish)
- Pistoleros/Putas y dementes (Greatest Hits), poems et flash fictions. (in Spanish)
- Lo que todavía no sabes del pez hielo, novel. (in Spanish)

== Awards and honors ==
- 1985 Premio Nacional de Poesía ICFES
- 1986 Concurso Revista Aracataca
- 1986 Concurso Nacional de Cuento de Barranquilla
- 1986 Concurso Nacional de Cuento de Medellín
- 1987 Concurso Nacional de Novela Ciudad de Pereira.
- 1995 Premio Nacional de Literatura Colcultura for Cinema árbol y otros cuentos
- 1997 Concurso nacional de novela del Ministerio de Cultura for Erase una vez el amor pero tuve que matarlo
- 1999 Beca del Fondo Mixto de Cultura de Cartagena
