= José María Sierra =

Colombian businessman (1843–1921)

Don José María "Pepe" Sierra
- Born: December 18, 1843; Girardota, Republic of New Granada
- Died: March 7, 1921 (aged 77); Medellín, Colombia
- Resting place: San Pedro Cemetery Museum
- Other name: Pepe Sierra
- Occupations: Countryman, businessman, landowner, moneylender
- Era: 19th–20th centuries
- Known for: Richest man of Colombia during the 19th century
- Partner: Zoraida Cadavid Cadavid
- Children: 4: María Sierra Cadavid; Isabel Sierra Cadavid; Clara Sierra Cadavid; Aníbal Sierra Cadavid
- Parent(s): Evaristo Sierra Gaviria and Gabriela Sierra Cadavid
- Relatives: Rafael Reyes Prieto (in-law)

José María Sierra Sierra (December 18, 1843 – March 7, 1921) known as "Pepe" Sierra, was a Colombian businessman and landowner who amassed part of his fortune speculating in the drinks monopoly. He was considered the richest man of Colombia during the 19th Century.

== Career ==
In 1886 he went to reside in Medellín. There he founded several companies such as 'La Cuarta Compañía', dedicated to raising cattle and planting extensive cane fields to supply molasses to his brandy factories, already prosperous throughout the department.

== Bogotá period ==
The first trip to Bogotá was made in 1888. It was the beginning of a 26-year residence in the capital of the country, where he began as a bettor and breeder of fighting cocks in the underworld of the city, later moving to the banking areas. and residence of opulent people. He had his daughter Clara Sierra Cadavid married to a son of former Colombian President Rafael Reyes Prieto, which led to frequent visits to the San Carlos Palace. He quickly became convinced that he was the only one capable of bailing out the impoverished governments of his time. The presidents Rafael Núñez Moledo, Miguel Antonio Caro Tobar, Carlos Holguín Mallarino, Jorge Holguín Mallarino, José Manuel Marroquín Ricaurte, Rafael Reyes Prieto, Ramón González Valencia and Carlos Eugenio Restrepo Restrepo were on his list of clients.

He started his business in Bogotá with the auction of the income from cattle and leather from Cundinamarca, but later he felt he had the right to monopolize the income. Sierra took advantage of the economic situation of his time, characterized by the permanent crisis that internal rebellions caused the national treasury. During the time of the movement called Regeneration, the problem became more acute. The then president, Rafael Núñez tried to solve public finances through the reactivation of auctions and state monopolies, abundant issuance of forced currency paper and the placement of bonds and payrolls in the market. The so-called auctions were the means to procure advances from private individuals. These were generally very solvent, since economic guarantees (mortgages, sureties, anticipated monetary deposits) were required of them in exchange for the privilege of enjoying the secure profits produced by such monopolies. José María Sierra quickly became the strongest auctioneer and lender nationwide, based on a simple business administrative system, but with an intricate network of agents spread throughout the country, in charge of negotiating the allocation of rents.

He extended the brandy manufacturing business to Valle del Cauca together with his cousin Apolinar Sierra Sierra. At the San José de Palmira hacienda and others in Cali and Yumbo, he created one of the region's agro-industrial empires. Also in Cauca, he auctioned off the 'Salento' farm and other assets of the Italian businessman Ernesto Cerruti, put up for auction by the Popayán government, which gave rise to the so-called 'Cerruti Conflict' during the decade from 1880 to 1890, and which brought as Consequently, the blockade of the Colombian north coast by the Italian navy and a heavy fine to compensate the damages to the aforementioned businessman.

In 1900 he acquired the Casablanca hacienda in Madrid, Cundinamarca from writer José María Vergara y Vergara, colonial hacienda that belonged to the Vergara family for over 200 years. He, his wife Zoraida Cadavid de Sierra and his 13 children lived there. The hacienda currently exists and is owned by Sierra's heirs. He and his wife Zoraida Cadavid left an important legacy in the municipality, such as the Zoraida Cadavid de Sierra Institute and the Guillermo Gómez Sierra Student House, founded by the grandson with the same name.

== Personal life ==
Later considered the richest man in Colombia, he lived austerely, something that he did not change when he entered the upper echelons of Bogotá, and he did not increase his family's social representation expenses. Sierra was also a businessman who financed the last stage of the construction of railways in Colombia. He was responsible for the completion of the Amagá Railroad and part of the Pacific Railroad, in which he was a partner of Nemesio Camacho and his friend Félix Salazar. He began as a banker establishing the 'Banco de Sucre' and the 'Banco Central ', in addition to the Ice Company in Panama. However, he failed in these entrepreneurial endeavors.

In the biography about his grandfather, the writer Bernardo Jaramillo affirmed that his relative's businesses would be seen today as irregular, although it was the weak Colombian economic system that left the State in the hands of lenders as the only way to guarantee their functioning. At that time, there was no exchange regime, nor was there a currency-issuing bank, but there were serious problems such as a high exchange rate between ten thousand and fifteen thousand percent and strong political instability.

== Return to Antioquia ==
Pepe Sierra died in 1921 at his house in the Plaza de San Ignacio in Medellín.

== Legacy ==
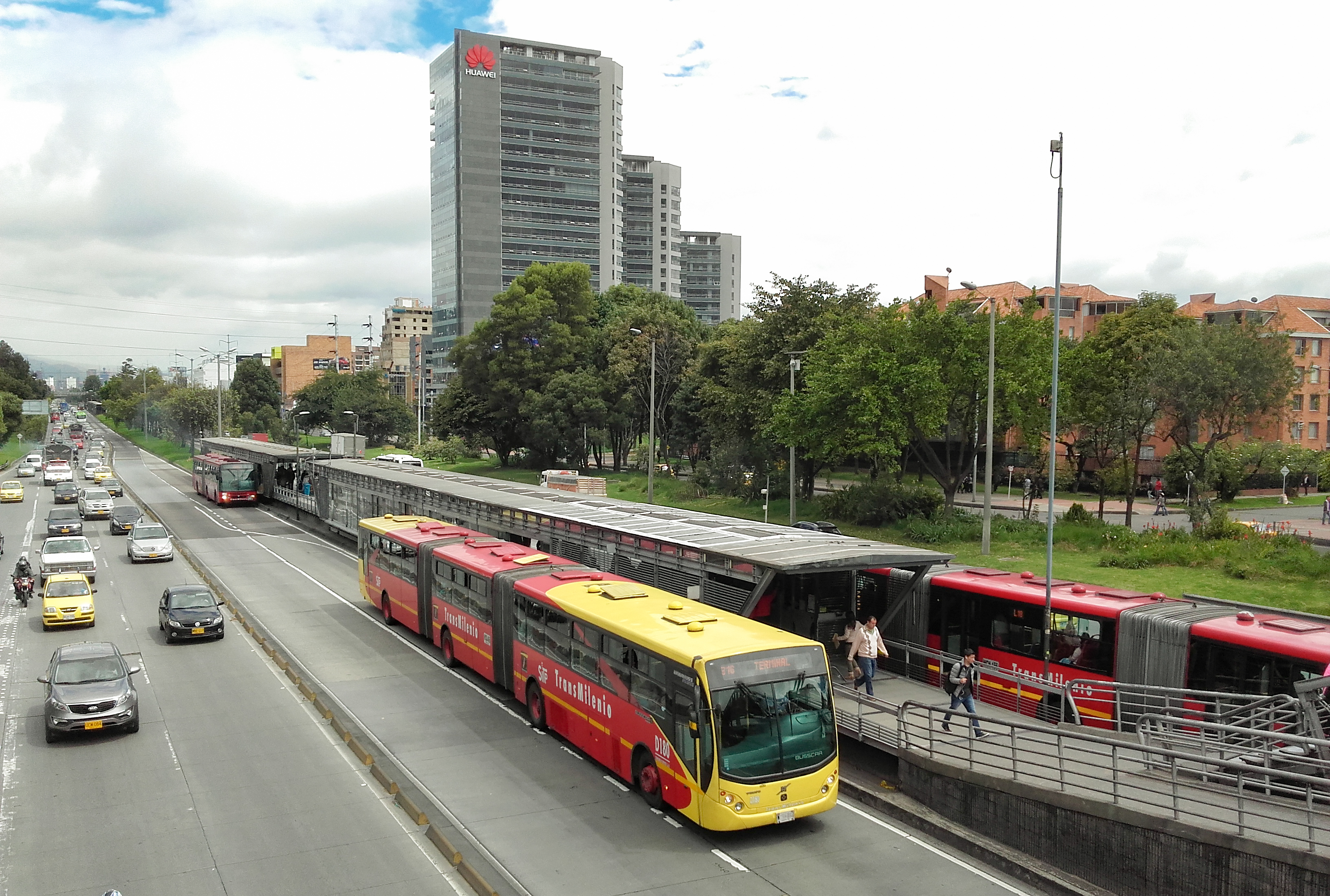
Pepe Sierra tm station, Bogotá, Cundinamarca. 2018

In Bogotá, a station and an avenue bear his name, and in Medellín he owned a house in what is now Plazuela de San Ignacio. Contemporary accounts describe Don Pepe Sierra as one of the wealthiest individuals in Colombia at the beginning of the 20th century.

José or 'El Becerro de Oro' or 'El Campesino Millonario' is together with Marco A. Restrepo 'El Rey de la Leña', Carlos Coriolano Amador 'El Burro de Oro', and Gonzalo Mejía 'El Fabricador de Sueños'; member of the select group of characters that has given life to the mythical prototype of the businessman from Antioquia.

Mausoleum of José María Sierra in the San Pedro Cemetery Museum.
