= Anthem of Bogotá =

Anthem of Bogotá, Colombia

Himno de Bogotá DC
English: Anthem of Bogotá DC
- Partiture of the Anthem of Bogotá
- anthem of Bogotá
- Lyrics: Pedro Medina Avendaño, 1967
- Music: Roberto Pineda Duque, 1967
- Adopted: July 31, 1974

The Anthem of Bogotá is the musical composition that symbolizes the Colombia's capital city. It was officially adopted through the decree 1000 of July 31, 1974.

== History ==
The anthem's lyrics were written by the poet Pedro Medina Avendaño and the music was composed by the musician Roberto Pineda Duque. The anthem was selected through a public concourse announced following the agreement 71 of 9 September 1967, whose judge was named by the decree number 731 of 3 July 1974 and the prize was 50.000 pesos. The judges of the concourse selected this song on 31 July 1974 and the mayor Anibal Fernandez de Soto signed the decree that declared the song as the official anthem of the city. Its debut was on 7 August 1974 in a concert made in the Jorge Eliecer Gaitan Theater. The agreement 1 of April 19, 1988, fixes the rules for the use of the symbols of the city of Bogotá, the decree 120 of March 14, 1991, obligates the citizens to teach the symbols of the city in the educative centers and also to intone the anthem at every public event within the city. Finally the decree 64 of February 12 of 1993 requests every educative establishment to raise the city's flag weekly along with the intonation of the anthem. Since the declaration of this decree, some football fans intone the anthem on every sport event, something that helps to promote the learning of the anthem among the youth of the city.

== Lyrics ==
Spanish lyrics	English translation
Coro	Chorus
Entonemos un himno a tu cielo, a tu tierra y tu puro vivir, blanca estrella que alumbra en los Andes ancha senda que va al porvenir.	Let's intone an anthem to your sky To your land and your pure life White star shining in the Andes; Wide path going to the future.
I	I
Tres guerreros abrieron tus ojos a una espada, a una cruz y a un pendón. Desde entonces no hay miedo en tus lindes, ni codicia en tu gran corazón.	Three warriors opened your eyes To a sword, a cross and a banner Since then there's no fear in your boundaries Nor greed in your big heart.
II	II
Hirió el hondo diamante un Agosto, el cordaje de un nuevo laúd, y hoy se escucha el fluir melodioso en los himnos de la juventud.	It hurt the deep diamond an August; The cordage of a new lute And today it's heard the tuneful lyrics In the anthems of the youth
III	III
Fértil madre de altiva progenie que sonríe ante el vano oropel, siempre atento a la luz del mañana y al pasado y su luz siempre fiel.	Fertile mother of high progeny Laughing before the empty glitz Always attentive to the light of the future And to the past and its light always loyal.
IV	IV
La Sabana es un cielo caído, una alfombra tendida a tus pies y del mundo variado que animas eres brazo y cerebro a la vez.	The Savanna is a fallen sky A carpet before your foot And of the varied world you animate You're arm and brain at the same time.
V	V
Sobreviven de un reino dorado, de un imperio sin puestas de sol, en ti un templo, un escudo, una reja, un retablo, una pila, un farol.	They survive of a golden kingdom Of an empire without sundown In you a temple, a coat, a fence An altarpiece, a font, a lamp.
VI	VI
Al gran Caldas, que escruta los astros y a Bolívar, que torna a nacer; a Nariño, accionando la imprenta, como en los sueños los vuelves a ver.	To the big Caldas searching the stars And to Bolivar who returns when getting born To Nariño turning the press on As in dreams you watch them again
VII	VII
Caros, Cuervos y Pombos y Silva, tantos hombres de fama inmortal, que en el hilo sin fin de la historia les dio vida tu amor maternal.	Caros, Cuervos, and Pombos and Silvas; So many men of eternal fame, That in the endless thread of the history They was given life by your maternal love
VIII	VIII
Flor de razas, compendio y corona, en la patria no hay otra ni habrá. Nuestra voz la repiten los siglos: ¡Bogotá, Bogotá, Bogotá!.	Race's flower, compendium and crown In the country there's no other nor will there be Our voice is repeated by the centuries ¡Bogotá!, ¡Bogotá!, ¡Bogotá!
