= Hernando Urriago Benítez =

Hernando Urriago Benítez is a poet and essay writer who was born in Cali, Colombia in 1974. He studied literature in Universidad del Valle and a Magister in Colombian and Latin American literature. His grading thesis was about essay writer Baldomero Sanín Cano. Urriago Benítez won the National Poetry Prize in 1999.

He currently works in Universidad del Valle with other writers like Carlos Patiño Millán, Fabio Martínez and Oscar Perdomo Gamboa.

== Works ==
- Esplendor de la Ceniza (Cinder's splendor), 2003.
- Caligrafías del Asombro. 2006, essays
- Caligrafías del asombro: ensayos críticos sobre letras de Colombia y de Latinoamérica, Universidad del Valle, 2006, ISBN 978-958-670-486-1
- El signo del centauro: variaciones sobre el discurso ensayístico de Baldomero Sanín Cano, Universidad del Valle, 2007, ISBN 978-958-670-563-9
- Hernando Urriago Benítez, Fabio Martínez Cali-grafías, la ciudad literaria, 2008, ISBN 978-958-670-632-2, collecting authors like Jorge Isaacs, Andrés Caicedo and José Eustaquio Palacios.
