= ¡Que viva la música! =

1977 novel by Andrés Caicedo

Liveforever
- Author: Andrés Caicedo
- Original title: ¡Que viva la música!
- Translator: Frank Wynne
- Language: Spanish
- Series: Penguin Modern Classics
- Publisher: Penguin Books
- Publication date: 1977
- Publication place: Colombia
- English publication date: 2014
- Media type: Paperback
- Pages: 208
- ISBN: 9789875455085

¡Que viva la música! (Published in English as: Liveforever) is a novel by the Colombian writer Andrés Caicedo, one of his most important works and considered by many observers as a masterpiece of modern Colombian literature. He started to write it on a trip to Los Angeles trying to get in touch with Roger Corman in order to sell to the famous Hollywood director four of his play scripts, but he was not welcomed. Caicedo devoted his time in the US to seeing movies, studying blues and rock and writing this novel. The book was finally published in Cali on March 4, 1977. That same afternoon, its author committed suicide.

Caicedo described his book as a result of an "ephemeral curiosity", but there is a small but dedicated core of readers who believe it to be one of the greatest novels among Colombian literature of the second half of the 20th century.

== Context ==
The novel is set in the city of Cali, known also as the "World Capital of Salsa". It is also the native city of Caicedo, who reflects its barrios and streets and its people of the 1970s.

== Plot summary ==
The novel has been seen as an invitation to a party without end, where the main character comes to see the world as a bottomless pit of debauchery, which she relishes. There is a secret pact with death itself involving the ever more frantic dance of María del Carmen Huerta, the blonde protagonist of the book.

The novel also offers an affectionate view of the Colombian city of Cali as unique, magic, and different. Our introduction starts in the privileged north, with its Sixth Avenue ("la Sexta"), Parque Versalles, and its magical places, continuing to the ghetto in the South with its Caseta Panamericana (built especially for the 1971 Pan American Games), the Pance River, the neighborhoods beyond upper-class Miraflores, the winged Andes mountain range, and the hideouts of sex and salsa in the final stretches of 15th Street ("la Quince").

== María del Carmen Huerta ==
She is a girl of good family, the daughter of a photographer of the Calean high society. But living in a high class comes to be for her boring and then she decided to explore the streets of the city. Through the eyes of Maria del Carmen, Caicedo shows the different social groups of the 1970s Cali, that reflects also the Colombian society and in a wider way Latin America. As a kind of Siddhartha of Hermann Hesse, Maria del Carmen goes from group to group looking for a sense for her life.

The first group she found is of Marxists who used to go by the streets of Cali or Bogotá with backpacks, untidy hair and Das Kapital to read anywhere to anyone who dare to listen to them as a kind of preachers. She got bored of this first team and abandoned them soon to look more pure emotions

She came to the rock world imported to the city by the children of parents who were able to study in the US and return to Cali wearing gang clothes. Maria del Carmen became a part of a gang to try any kind of drugs while listening to the Rolling Stones.
