= Elizabeth Castillo Vargas =

Colombian lawyer, writer, LGBT activist, comedian and politician

- Born: November 30, 1970 (age 55); Manizales, Colombia
- Occupations: writer, politician
- Employer: Mayor of Bogotá
- Known for: LGBT activist

Elizabeth Castillo Vargas (born November 30, 1970) is a Colombian lawyer, writer, LGBT activist, comedian and politician. She started work in the Bogotá Mayor's office looking at social integration in 2022.

== Early life and education ==
Castillo was born in Manizales in 1970. She studied law at the University of Caldas and afterwards gathered expertise on issues relating to gender, reproduction and sexual rights. She is a lesbian and also a mother and in 2003 she created a group for women who were also lesbian mothers in Bogotá.

In 2005 she was the Bogotá LGBT Roundtable's spokesperson until, starting in 2007, she helped with establishing a new centre in Bogota for the LGBT community. This novel creation involved her until 2009.

She is a Catholic and she writes about the position of a lesbian woman within the faith. She uses the persecution that Jesus suffered as a metaphor for how Catholics should treat minorities today. She argues that you cannot be homophobic and a Christian.

She wrote "We are not et cetera, twenty years of history of the LGBT movement in Colombia."

In 2013 to 2014 she was one the Colombian Liberal Party's candidates for the Senate. She stated her supported for equal marriages and support for the LGBT community. She noted that the mayor, Enrique Peñalosa, was supportive. She was not elected.

In June 2022 she was pleased to report that she had been appointed as the LGBTI Deputy Director of the District Social Integration Secretariat by the Mayor of Bogata. Hew new job needed the skills of a lawyer and an expert in gender issues.

== Career ==
- Monitoring and Evaluation Coordinator (2012): Monitoring of projects, reports and process control.
- District Secretariat for Women (2015-2018) Bogota D.C. Bogota D.C.Director of Differential Approach.
  - She led the Differential Approach Management team, a team that companies could refer to in order to improve their inclusive policy helping them with ethnicity, race, age, sexual orientation, gender identity and other conditions or situations of vulnerability, such as living on the street. She and her team processed agreements and negotiations of affirmative actions aimed at these population groups. Elizabeth coordinated the project of alternative masculinities in the "SdMujer". She was part of the initial team of the Early Maternity and Paternity Reduction Program in Bogotá.
  - She was the advisor on Sexual and Reproductive Rights by formulating and supporting technical guidelines and conceptual approaches on sexual and reproductive rights. Elizabeth also accompanied the definition of lines of work on violence against women, HIV, teenage pregnancy. She advised communication strategies and activities in relation to sexual and reproductive rights.
- Author of No somos etcetera, twenty years of history of the LGBT movement in Colombia.

== Selected writing ==
- Labor Discrimination Against Lesbians in Latin America – Colombia Chapter International Gay and Lesbian Human Rights Commission IGLHRC, 2004
- Medical Conscientious Objection. Profamilia, 2006.
- LGBT survey, sexuality and rights. Attendees to the Bogotá LGBT citizenship march. Profamily, 2009.
- We are not et cetera, twenty years of history of the LGBT movement in Colombia
