= Belén de Umbría =

Coordinates: 5°12′N 75°52′W

- Municipality and town
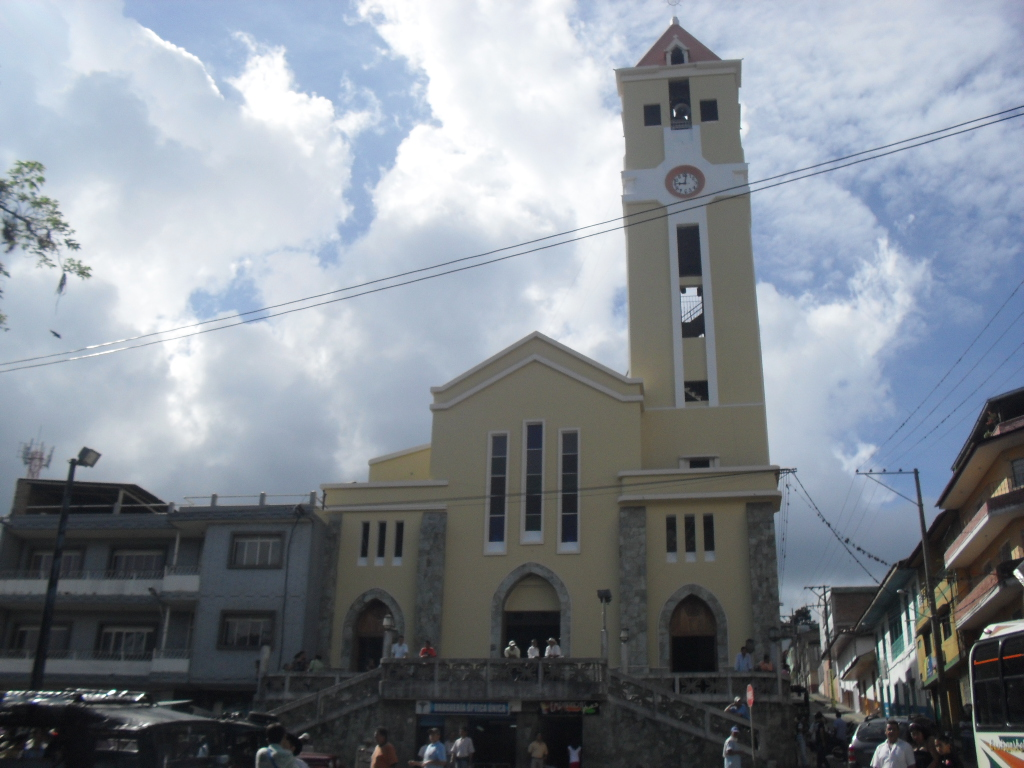
- Bethlehem Umbria Church

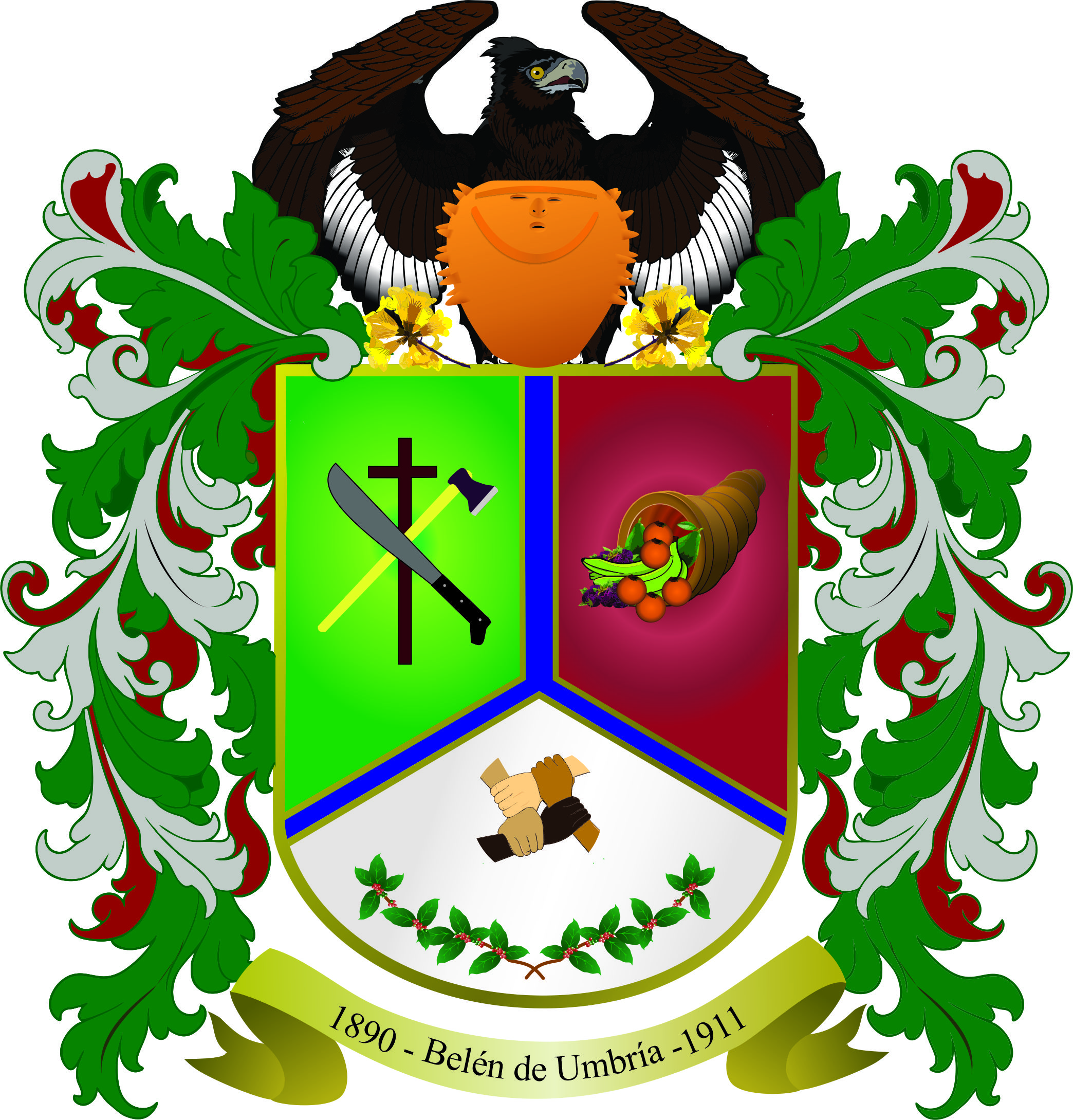
- Flag Coat of arms

- Location of the municipality and town of Belén de Umbría in the Risaralda Department of Colombia.
- Country: Colombia
- Department: Risaralda Department
- Elevation: 1,634 m (5,361 ft)

Population (2023)
  - Total: 25,276
- Time zone: UTC-5 (Colombia Standard Time)

Belén de Umbría is a town and municipality in the Department of Risaralda, Colombia. At a distance of approximately 70 kilometers from the capital Pereira. In 2023 the town had an estimated population of 25,276.

== History ==
The name Belén was chosen by a bishop who visited these lands in 1902, because they say that when he arrived at the village he commented: "this place looks like a manger, it should be called Bethlehem" and Umbria in homage to the Umbra, one of the most prominent tribes of this region. It was founded on August 10, 1890 and at this time it has more than 25,000 inhabitants.

== Climate ==
Belén de Umbría is situated 1,634 metres above sea level, due to that elevation the town has a subtropical highland climate with an average annual temperature of 20°C.
