= Enrique Pardo Farelo =

Enrique Pardo Farelo (1883-1965) was a Colombian novelist, poet and short story writer. He was also known by his pseudonym Luis Tablanca. Pardo Farelo was born in El Carmen and lived in Ocana, Norte de Santander in his youth. He was a co-founder of the journals Cromos and El Gráfico. Known for his short stories, his most important book was the critical work Una derrota sin batalla (A defeat without a fight). It was first published in 1935 and then reissued in 1983.
