= Andrés Caicedo =

Colombian writer (1951–1977)

- Born: Luis Andrés Caicedo Estela; September 29, 1951; Cali, Colombia
- Died: 4 March 1977 (aged 25); Cali, Colombia
- Occupations: Novelist; poet; playwright

Luis Andrés Caicedo Estela (29 September 1951 – 4 March 1977) was a Colombian writer born in Cali, the city where he would spend most of his life. Despite his premature death, his works are considered to be some of the most original produced in Colombia. Caicedo led different cultural movements in the city like the literary group "Los Dialogantes" (Those who speak), the Cinema Club of Cali and the "Ojo al Cine" Magazine (Attention to the Cinema). In 1970, he won the First Literary Contest of Caracas with his work "Los dientes de caperucita" (The Teeth of Little Red Riding Hood) that opened the doors of national recognition for him. Some sources say that he used to say that to live more than 25 years was a shame and it is seen as the main reason of his suicide on March 4, 1977, when he was that age.

Caicedo's work has as its context the urban world and its social conflicts, especially those of young people. Contrary to the school of magic realism, the work of Caicedo is grounded completely in social reality. Therefore, some scholars give importance to his work as an alternative in Latin America to prominent figures such as Gabriel García Márquez, especially through the research of the Chilean journalist, writer and movie critic Alberto Fuguet who called Caicedo "The first enemy of Macondo". Despite his fame in Colombia, Caicedo is little known in Latin America, maybe for his early death. However his work is becoming known thanks to the influence of his works in new writer generations such as Rafael Chaparro, Efraim Medina Reyes, Manuel Giraldo, Octavio Escobar and Ricardo Abdahllah.

== Biography ==
=== First years ===
Andrés Caicedo was the youngest surviving child and only surviving son of Carlos Alberto Caicedo and Nellie Estella. His brother Francisco José was born in 1958, but died three years later. By that time Andrés was studying in Colegio del Pilar, after he was in Colegio Pio XII, a "very bad Franciscan establishment" as he said years after. Because of his bad behavior in the school in Cali, he was transferred to the Colegio Calasanz in Medellín in 1964 and this was the year of his first story: "El Silencio" (The Silence). However, his academic and discipline was rather the same, a reason to be transferred again to Cali, this time to Colegio Berchmans, an institution that would influence his works. From Berchmans he was expelled to go to Colegio San Luis in 1966, again expelled and finally he could finish his high school in Colegio Camacho Perea in 1968.

=== Among pages, stages and cinema ===
Along with his passion for literature, Caicedo liked cinema and stage. In 1966, he wrote his first play, "Las curiosas conciencias" (Curious Minds) and his first story, "Infection". A year later he directed the play "The Bald Soprano" by Eugène Ionesco and he wrote "The End of the Vacations", "Welcoming the New Student", "The Sea", "The Imbeciles are also Witnesses" and "The Skin of the Other Hero". His last work would make him win the First Students' Theatre Festival of the Theatre Department of University of Valle. He abandoned the university in 1971 to join the Cali Theatre Company (Teatro Experimental de Cali) as an actor, and there he met the famous Colombian director Enrique Buenaventura.

In 1969, he also started to write cinema reviews for newspapers, for example in the Cali newspaper El País, in Occidente and El Pueblo. He got another award with his story "Berenice" in the Story Contest of the University of Valle, while his story "The Teeth of Little Red Riding Hood" won the second place of the Latin American Story Contest organized by the Caracas Image Magazine. He adapted and directed the work of Eugène Ionesco: "The Chairs". He wrote the story "For this reason I am back to my city", "Empty", "The Messengers", "Besacalles", "From Up to Down, From Left to Right", "The Spectator", "Happy Friendships" and "Lulita, that you do not want to open the door?".

=== The Cinema Club of Cali ===
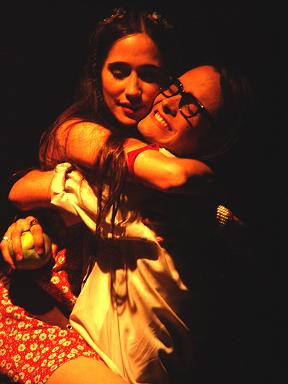
A representation of a work of Caicedo, "Little Bogged Down Angels" (Angelitos empantanados) by Matacandelas Theatre Company of Medellín in 2003.

His love for cinema was the motive for opening the Cinema Club of Cali with his friends Ramiro Arbeláez, Hernando Guerrero and Luis Ospina in 1969. It started its meetings in the headquarters of the Company of Theatre of Cali (Teatro Experimental de Cali), but later moved to the Alameda Cinema and finally to the San Fernando Cinema. The Cinema Club attracted many students, intellectuals and critics who used to watch the movies and meet afterwards to discuss and analyze the films with Caicedo.

In 1970. he adapted and directed The Night of the Assassins of José Triana and in that same year he wrote a new story, "Antígona". In 1971, he wrote stories like "Patricialinda", "Cannibalism", "Fatal Little Destinies", "Angelita and Miguel Ángel" and "El atravesado". He wrote also some essays: "The Heroes of the Beginning", an essay about the work of Mario Vargas Llosa, "The Time of the Hero" and "The Sea", an essay on the work of Harold Pinter.

His friend Carlos Mayolo tried unsuccessfully to bring to cinema his screenplay "Angelita and Miguel Angel" in 1972. In that year he wrote the screenplay "A Good Man is Very Difficult to Find" and the stories "The Suitor" and "The Time of the Swamp", which was awarded by the National Contents of Story of the Universidad Externado de Colombia.

=== Looking for Hollywood ===
In 1973, Caicedo went to Los Angeles and New York. He knew sufficient English and had dreamed of meeting the legendary Roger Corman in order to sell to him four of his play scripts that his sister had translated into English. He had come thinking that Hollywood would welcome him with open hands. However, the venture was unsuccessful and Corman never got ahold of his books. About Hollywood he said:

It is a very difficult and labyrinthine world and those over there do not give support, fearing competition.

As nobody in Hollywood paid attention to the "writer with the face of a rockstar" in the 1960s, Caicedo dedicated himself to watching movies, studying blues and rock, especially the Rolling Stones and writing a new story, ¡Que viva la música!, a work that was to become the most internationally recognized title of Caicedo so far. He also began work on "Memories of a Cinema Lover", a diary he intended to make into a novel. However, he could have an interview with Sergio Leone and returned to Colombia.

=== Last years ===
Caicedo considered that his best work was "Maternity", a story written in 1974. In that year, he also published "Ojo al cine" (Attention to the Cinema), which would become one of the most important magazines on the topic in Colombia. He returned to the U.S., but this time to participate in the International Exposition of Cinema and a year later the publishing house "Pirata de Calidad" published his story "El Atravesado" thanks to the economic support of his mother, and his national recognition.

=== Suicide ===
Caicedo had mentioned that to live past the age of 25 was madness and he died by suicide at age 25 on March 4, 1977. On the afternoon he died, he received a volume of his recently published book "Que viva la música!. He took 60 pills of secobarbital. Analyzing his death, Alberto Fuguet says:

"Caicedo is the missing link of the lost boom. He is the first enemy of Macondo. I do not know if he committed suicide or maybe was killed by García Márquez and the dominant culture of the times. He was less the rocker that Colombians want and more of an intellectual. [He was] A super tormented, genial nerd. He had imbalances, life-induced anxiety. He was not comfortable with life. He had problems standing on his own two feet. And he had to write in order to survive. He killed himself because he saw too much."

== Influence ==
The first Colombian author to evince Caicedo's influence may be Manuel Giraldo Magil from the city of Ibagué, in his work "Concerts of Bewilderment" ("Conciertos del desconcierto"). In the 1990s, the work of Rafael Chaparro Madiedo, "Opio en las nubes" (Opium in the Clouds), was viewed as a Caicedian piece of work. Other authors like Octavio Escobar Giraldo, Efraím Medina, and Ricardo Abdahllah are related to what is becoming a real literary school. The Theatre Company of the city of Medellín, Matacandelas, has played "Angelitos empantanados" for over a decade.

== Works ==
Most of Caicedo's works were published after his death, thanks to the commitment of some of his friends. The works include in stories, playwrights for stage and cinema, and essays. Some of his personal letters to his mother, sisters and friends, were also published. The importance of the letters is that they show the turbulence of his soul.

- El cuento de mi vida (2007). Bogotá: Norma.
- Noche sin fortuna / Antígona (2002). Bogotá: Norma.
- Ojo al cine (1999). Bogotá: Norma.
- Angelitos empantanados o historias para jovencitos / A propósito de Andrés Caicedo y su obra (1995). Bogotá: Norma.
- Recibiendo al nuevo alumno (1995). Cali: Editorial de la Facultad de Humanidades. Universidad del Valle.
- Destinitos fatales (1984). Bogotá: Oveja Negra.
- Berenice / El atravesado / Maternidad / El Tiempo de la ciénaga (1978). Cali: Editorial Andes.

=== Novels ===
- ¡Que viva la música! (1977)
- Noche sin fortuna (unfinished) (1976)
- La estatua del soldadito de plomo (unfinished) (1967)

=== Stories ===
- Pronto (1976)
- En las garras del crimen (1975)
- Maternidad (1974)
- El pretendiente (1972)
- El tiempo de la ciénaga (1972)
- El atravesado (1971)
- Destinitos fatales (1971)
- Calibanismo (1971)
- Patricialinda (1971)
- Antígona (1970)
- Berenice (1969)
- Lulita, ¿qué no quiere abrir la puerta? (1969)
- Felices amistades (1969)
- El espectador (1969)
- De arriba a abajo de izquierda a derecha (1969)
- Besacalles (1969)
- Vacíos (1969)
- Por eso yo regreso a mi ciudad (1969)
- Infección (1966)
- Los mensajeros (1969)
- Los dientes de Caperucita (1969)
- Infección (1966)
- El silencio (1964)

=== Writings for cinema and stage ===
- Un hombre bueno es difícil de encontrar (1972)
- El fin de las vacaciones (1967)
- Recibiendo al nuevo alumno (1967)
- El mar (1967)
- Los imbéciles también son testigos (1967)
- La piel del otro héroe (1967)
- Las curiosas conciencias (1966)
