= Fernando Denis =

Colombian poet and author

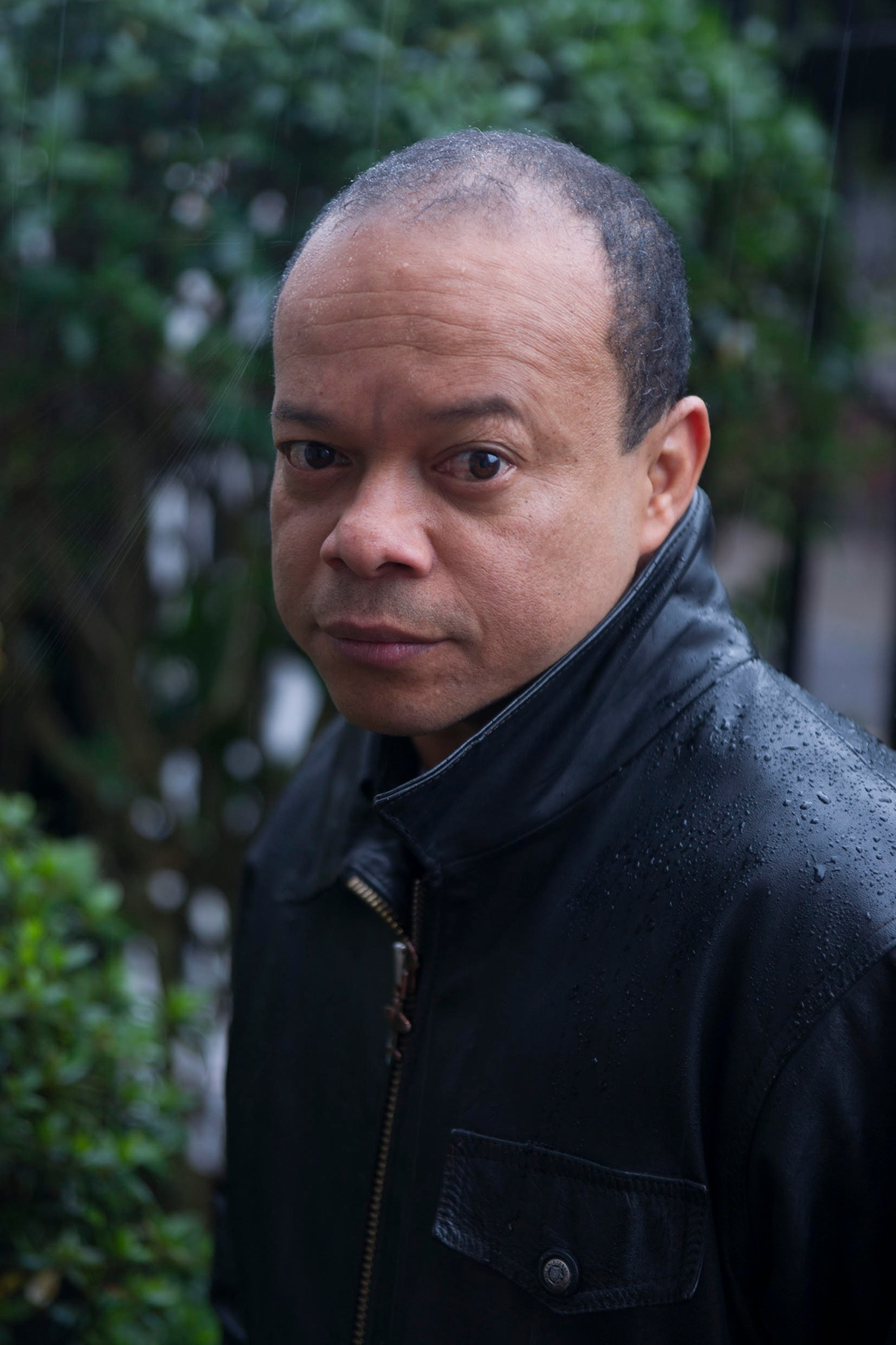
- Born: José Luis González Sanjuan; Cienaga, Magdalena, Colombia
- Occupations: Poet, writer, and journalist
- Writing career
- Language: Spanish
- Genre: Poetry
- Notable work: The Geometry of Water

José Luis González Sanjuan, better known by the pen name Fernando Denis, is a Colombian poet and author. He was born in Cienaga, Magdalena, Colombia, in 1968.

== Works ==
He has written books of poetry: The Invisible creature in the twilight of William Turner (1997), Come to these yellow sands (2004), The Red wine of syllables(2007) and The Geometry of Water (2009). His poetry has begun to generate interest within and outside his country, and his new book, The Geometry of Water, published by Norma, was presented at the Book Fairs in Buenos Aires and in Mainz in 2010 with success.

Paper Museum, engraving and printing of Argentina is being translated into English, French, German and Russian. Contemporaries, between critics and writers as William Ospina (winner of Prize Romulo Gallegos 2008), Juan Gustavo Cobo-Borda and José Ramón Ripoll, agree that Fernando Denis is one of today's most original voices in the poetry of Latin America. He is currently finishing his first novel, expected to be base on his own life.

The Geometry of Water was translated and published in India by Sahitya Akademi in November 2010.

== Psychology ==
"Fernando Denis is the successful result of a happy schizophrenia. On the one hand, from the world's creative craters near the Caribbean Sea and tropical nights to flights to heaven of Remedios the Beauty (Remedios La bella from One hundred years of solitude by Gabriel García Márquez ), the ghosts that evaporate and mangrove swamps. On the other hand, an irresistible fascination for the world of painting, which burns with fire his eyes with work of William Turner, Denis lost his footsteps in the stairs that lead nowhere in the engravings of Piranesi, and definitely went mad with tigers that Jorge Luis Borges imagined blue. His cult purpose: to become a myth of our poetry, oscillating between anger in Bogota Bohemian night and the memory of the Pre-Raphaelite Brotherhood. Ability to dissolve the reason in one color, in music, is one of his disturbing virtues," enthusiastically wrote Juan Gustavo Cobo Borda.

== Themes ==
His poetry focuses on landscape and natural imagery. His work also reflects influences from visual art and literary traditions, incorporating varied narrative voices and stylistic elements. His writing has been associated with contemporary Colombian poetry.

"The most obvious virtue of the poetry of Fernando Denis is originality," wrote William Ospina. "None of us refers to the words with more freedom, so when we read him the most common reader reaction is amazement, bewilderment."

== Reviews ==
In the preface to the Venezuelan edition of his book The sea throws its gold coins, José Ramón Ripoll, musicologist, editor of the Atlantic Magazine and one of the most acclaimed masters of modern Spanish poetry, wrote "Fernando Denis is a versatile poet, dense and full, in the sense that he looks and names the world without fuss, making all his experience in poetic material, from the high peaks of the mountains to the splash of the tread on his shoes puddles."
