= Floralba Uribe Marín =

Colombian writer, critic and women's rights activist

Floralba Uribe Marín (sometimes, Flor Alba Uribe Marín; 1943–2005) was a Colombian writer, poet, critic and activist for women's rights. She was born in Leticia in 1943. Her debut novel Historia de la pequeña Nubia y de su mercenaria virginidad was published in 1979. Other works include essays such as La mujer en la obra de García Márquez and La mujer en la obra de Pablo Neruda, and the book Erótica: poesía y cuento. She was vice-president of the Unión Nacional de Escritores.
