= Rafael Chaparro Madiedo =

Colombian novelist (1963-1995)

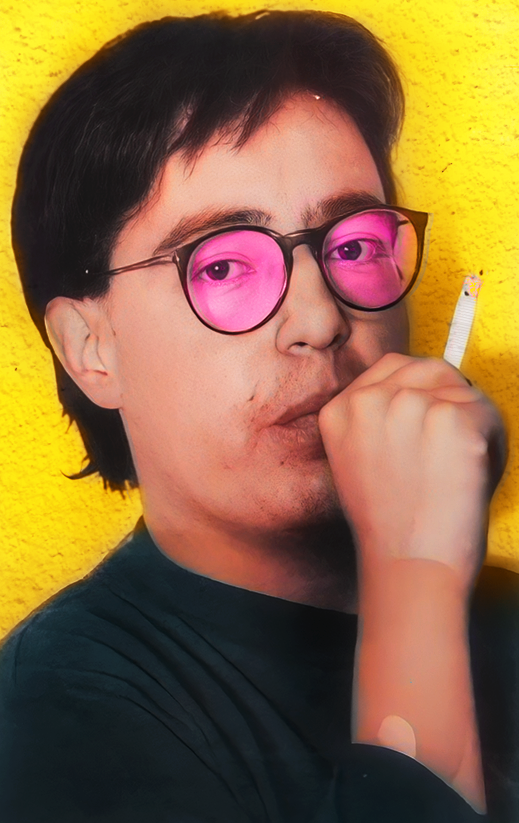
- Born: December 12, 1963; Bogotá, D.C., Colombia
- Died: April 18, 1995 (aged 31); Bogotá, Colombia
- Writing career
- Genre: Novel
- Movement: Postmodern

Rafael Chaparro Madiedo (born December 23, 1963, in Bogotá, died April 18, 1995, in Bogotá) was a Colombian writer who won Colombia's 1992 National Literature Prize for his only novel Opium in Clouds (Opio en las nubes). Chaparro was influenced by Colombian novelist Andrés Caicedo and by twentieth century American literary and art movements. As a teenager, Chaparro Madiedo graduated from the Colombian-Swiss school Helvetia; he later attended and graduated from the Universidad de los Andes with a B.A. in Philosophy and Literature. His novel Opium in Clouds received little initial literary acclaim outside of the National Literature award, but has been very popular among young adults in Colombia, eventually attaining cult status, and has an extended online fan base. He died of lupus on April 18, 1995.
