= Lyda Osorio =

Colombian physician, epidemiologist and infectious disease specialist

- Education: Universidad de Caldas (MD), London School of Hygiene and Tropical Medicine (PhD)
- Scientific career
- Fields: Epidemiology, Infectious disease, Vector-borne disease
- Workplaces: Universidad del Valle, CIDEIM
- Thesis: Effects of mobility on the transmission of malaria in an urban area in Colombia
- Doctoral advisor: Prof. David Bradley

Lyda Elena Osorio Amaya is a Colombian physician, epidemiologist and infectious disease specialist. She is an associate professor at the Universidad del Valle, and a researcher at the Centro Internacional de Entrenamiento e Investigaciones Médicas (CIDEIM) in Cali, Valle del Cauca. Osorio's research has focused mainly on vector-borne diseases like malaria, leishmaniasis, Zika and dengue fever. She has also played a role in Colombia's response against COVID-19.

== Education ==
Osorio studied medicine at the Universidad de Caldas. She then went on to do her 'mandatory social service' at CIDEIM for the final part of her medical degree. Osorio was awarded a scholarship from Colciencias (Colombian government) to pursue a PhD in Epidemiology at the London School of Hygiene and Tropical Medicine. She graduated in 2003, with a doctoral thesis on the effects of human movement on the transmission of malaria in the Colombian city of Quibdó, which is endemic for Plasmodium falciparum and P. vivax.

== Career ==
Osorio became an associate professor at the School of Public Health of the Universidad del Valle (UVAL) in 2007. Between 2014 and 2016, Osorio acted as the director of postgraduate programmes, and in 2018 she became the coordinator of the MSc epidemiology program, at the same University. She conducts research at the Epidemiology and Population Health group at UVAL, and is an associated researcher with CIDEIM.

In general her research has focused on the epidemiology, diagnosis and treatment of vector-borne diseases. In 2013, Osorio applied for and won a WHO/TDR fellowship to work at GSK's Diseases of the Developing World programme as a postdoctoral fellow. During her year at GSK she worked on a trial evaluating tafenoquine against P. vivax malaria, and on clinical data from a trial studying G6PD deficiency. Osorio is a Data Access Committee member of the Worldwide Antimalarial Resistance Network (WWARN). As part of the WWARN's gametocyte study group, she co-authored a meta-analysis of individual patient data to look at the effects of artemisinin combination therapy in gametocyte carriage.

In 2016, Osorio co-led a multi-center case-control study called Neurovirus Emerging in the Americas Study (NEAS), sponsored by Johns Hopkins University, which aimed to characterize the development of neurological symptoms after exposure to dengue, chikungunya and Zika. Results from this clinical trial supported the suspected development Guillain–Barré syndrome as a consequence of infection with the Zika virus. Osorio's further work in Zika has included the evaluation of personal protection measures by pregnant women and women of reproductive age in Colombia against the Aedes mosquito vector. She has also worked with dengue diagnosis in Colombia, and participated in clinical trials evaluating the use of meglumine antimoniate versus miltefosine for the treatment of cutaneous leishmaniasis in adults and children.

=== Work during the COVID-19 pandemic ===
Osorio has also played a role in Colombia's response against COVID-19. She was designated by the mayor of Cali as the "city's epidemiologist" to help the local Health Department's planning of adequate measures against the pandemic. Osorio is one of several scientists communicating with the Colombian government about strategies to control the spread of the new coronavirus, including a request to support universities working on diagnosis and research.

=== Other appointments and activities ===
- Osorio is a member of the ZikaPLAN Consortium, a network of researchers focused on Zika and other emerging infectious diseases
- Member of the Pan American Health Organization Malaria Technical Advisory Group.
- Data Access Committee member for the Infectious Diseases Data Observatory (IDDO).
- Editorial advisory board member for BMJ Global Health.

== Awards and recognitions ==
In December 2020, Osorio received the "Order 'Confederate Cities' in the rank of Commander Cross" on Pan American Doctor's day from the governor of Cali (Colombia) for her research and leadership during the COVID-19 pandemic in her country.

For International Women's Day in 2021, Osorio was listed as one of the 15 influential women in science around the world selected by the World Health Organization; Osorio was featured for her work against infectious diseases, and her leadership during the COVID-19 pandemic in Colombia.
