= Óscar Perdomo Gamboa =

Óscar Perdomo Gamboa is a writer born in the city of Ibagué, Colombia. Studied Journalism and a magister in Colombian and Latin American literature. Won the Jorge Isaacs award with the novel Hacia la Auora in 1998, a story about a student who can control other people's dreams. The book was published in 1999 and 2005. He's worked as teacher in several colleges of the city of Cali. In 2008, he published Ella, mi Sueño y el Mar (She, my dream and the sea), collection of romantic short stories dedicated to an imaginary muse. His third book is De cómo perdió sus vidas el gato (How did the cat lose his lives) is a novel for children about a cat who must visit the nine muses in order to reach wisdom. In 2011 with the poet Hernando Urriago Benítez published Escrito en la grama (written in the grass) an anthology of Colombian short stories about soccer. His controversial novel, MD™, is a parody about a surreal factory where everything is created. In 2014 he wrote Fútbol de carnaval (Carnival soccer), a book of short stories about Brazilian soccer players. In 2015 he published Allá en la Guajira Arriba a historic novel about the Colombian independence hero José Prudencio Padilla. He also has written diverse articles, some of them humorous, for local newspapers, magazines and web pages, including La Palabra, cultural publication of Universidad del Valle. Currently he teaches languages and literature in Cali, Colombia, with fellow writers like Carlos Patiño Millán and Fabio Martínez.
