= José María Vergara y Vergara =

Colombian writer, journalist, politician, historian and diplomat

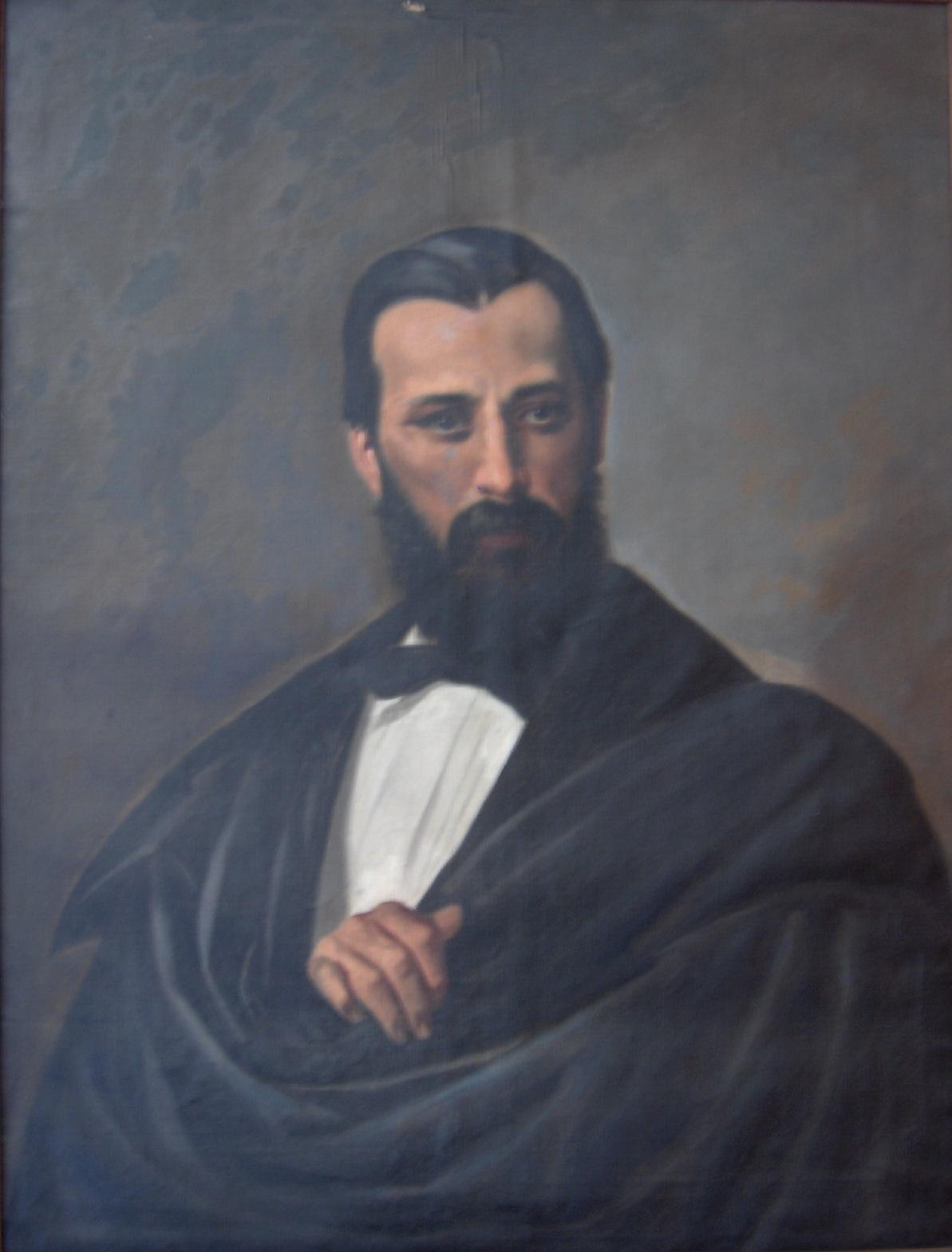
- Portrait of José María Vergara y Vergara located in the Colombian Academy of Language
- Born: 19 March 1831; Bogotá, Gran Colombia
- Died: 9 March 1872 (aged 40); Bogotá, United States of Colombia
- Occupations: Writer, journalist, diplomat, politician, literary critic, historian
- Spouse: Saturia Balcázar
- Children: Ignacia, Francisco José, Mercedes, Concepción y Tadeo
- Relatives: Eladio Vergara y Vergara
- Writing career
- Language: Spanish
- Notable work: Historia de la literatura en Nueva Granada (1867)
- Notable awards: Literature award José Maria Vergara y Vergara named after him by Government of Colombia

Signature
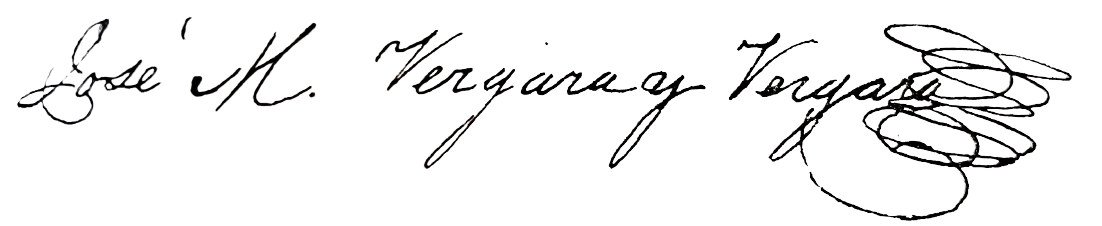

José María Vergara y Vergara (March 19, 1831 – March 9, 1872) was a Colombian writer, journalist, politician, historian and diplomat. Vergara y Vergara is known for writing the first literary history of Colombia, a detailed chronological compilation of authors, works, and literary movements between 1538 and 1820. Vergara founded and directed the Colombian Academy of Language alongside Manuel Antonio Caro, and Jose Cuervo. Considered the most prestigious and significant Colombian author of the 19th century

Upon Vergara y Vergara's death in 1887, the president of Colombia, created the "Jose Maria Vergara y Vergara" Literature Award.

== Biography ==
Born in Bogotá in 1831 into an old and aristocrat family. He was the sixth of ten children born to Ignacio Manuel de Vergara and Ignacia Vergara Nates.

At the Casablanca Hacienda (Madrid-Cundinamarca), a family heirloom on his paternal line, José María Vergara y Vergara spent many years of his childhood and it was a recurring motif in his evocative writing. The property had belonged to the family since colonial times, when Antonio Vergara Azcárate y Dávila was granted the royal decree of 1650, to grant him he "encomienda de indios del pueblo de Serrezuela". This way it passed from generation to generation until it finally became a memory when its last owner, José María Vergara y Vergara, could not save it from the enormous mortgage with which his father gave it to him. In 1900 it was acquired by José María Sierra Pepe Sierra and since then it has belonged to that family.

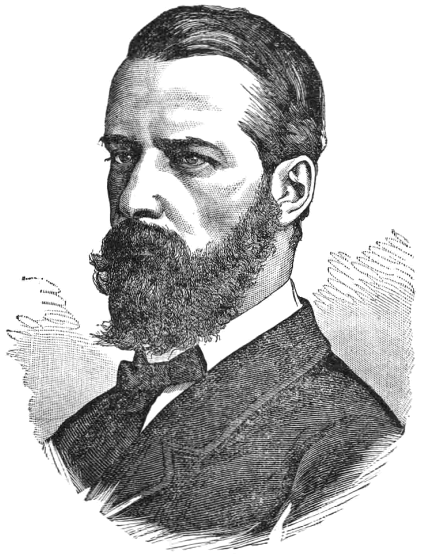
Portrait of José María Vergara y Vergara from the Colombian newspaper ''Papel Periódico Ilustrado'' (1881–1887)

In the 1850s he moved to Popayán, the city where he met his future wife, Saturia Balcázar, whom he married in 1854 and had five children: Ignacia, Francisco José, Mercedes, Concepción and Tadeo. These last two died early.

He worked as a professor of literature in Popayán, founded and edited various literary and political newspapers, and was treasurer of the Casa de Moneda in 1862. In 1867 he published two of the three parts of his most important work: Historia de la literatura en Nueva Granada (1535–1820) (the third part was never published).

Work

Vergara y Vergara admired and read assiduously the works of Fernán Caballero, Antonio Trueba, François René de Chateaubriand and Miguel de Cervantes. He published the Historia de la literatura en Nueva Granada part I y II (1867), the anthologies Parnaso colombiano and La lira granadina, novels such as Novela Americana alongside Jorge Isaacs and Guillermo Prieto and the biography Vida y escritos del general Nariño. He also wrote lyric poetry (Versos en borrador, 1869), costumbrismo portraits, emulating Fernán Caballero, (Las tres tazas y otros cuentos, 1863), and novels (Olivas y aceitunas, todas son unas, 1868).

Colombian politician and writer Jose Maria Samper described Vergara:

''as a prose artist, had a curious contrast: his soul was Spanish, his heart was Colombian, and his wit was French. He was a Spanish Santa Fe and a Castilian Parisian. He felt like a patriot: he thought like a Frenchman and wrote like a descendant of the race of Rioja, Herrera, Garcilaso and the Moratines. His style was a mixture of imitations, in which Fernán Caballero, :Trueba Y Selgas and Carrasco were shuffled with Alejandro Dumas, Víctor Hugo and Enrique Conscience.''

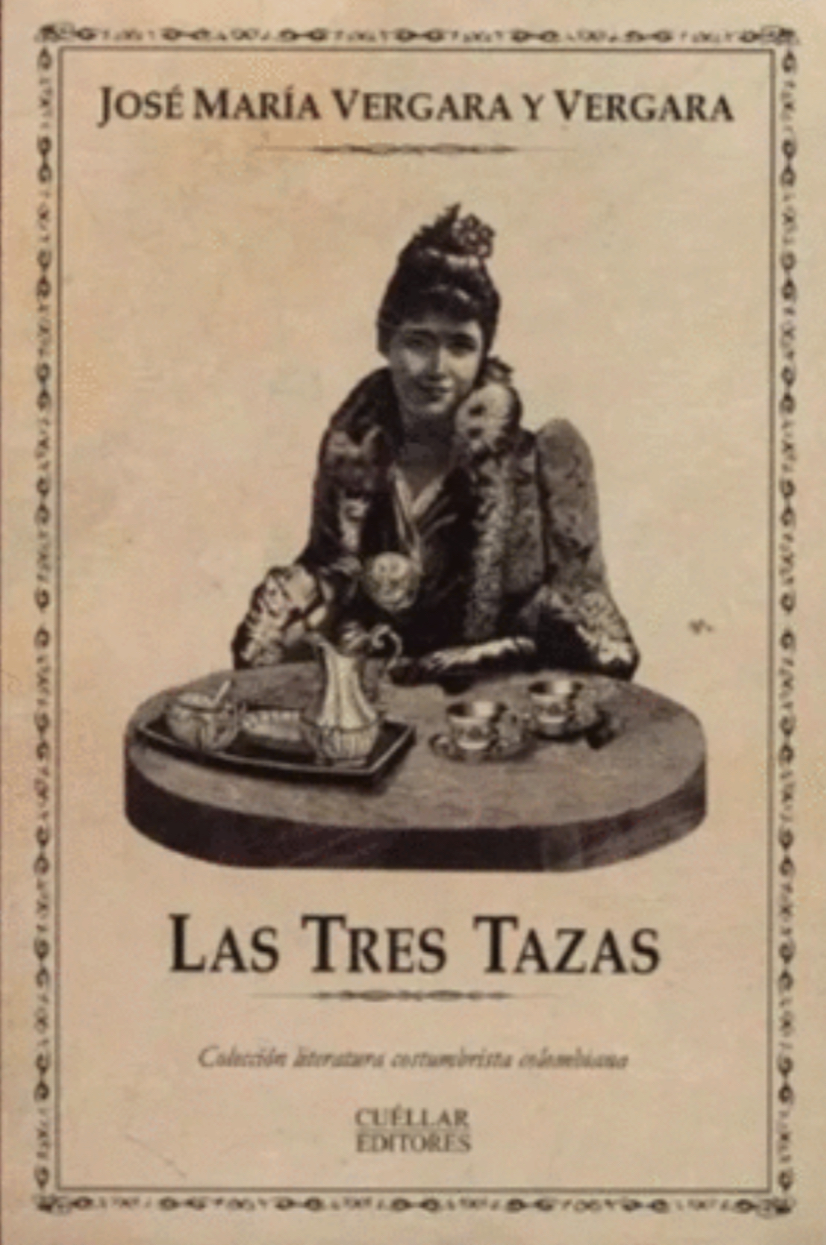
Las tres Trazas, work of Jose Maria Vergara y Vergara

According to his autobiography, he left some unedited manuscripts: the novel Mercedes; Cuadros Políticos o Días Históricos (starting from 1849); an incomplete dictionary of geography; a dictionary of biographies; and two incomplete novels, Un chismoso and Un odio a muerte.

== Newspapers founded or edited by Vergara y Vergara ==
La Siesta (Bogotá, 1852), with Rafael Pombo.
La Matricaria: Periódico de La Juventud. Colección de Artículos de Costumbres, Revistas y Literatura (Popayán, 1854)
El Mosaico: Miscelánea de Literatura, Ciencias y Música (Bogotá, 1858), with Ricardo Carrasquilla and José Manuel Marroquín.
El Heraldo: Órgano Del Partido Conservador (Bogotá, 1860).
El Cundinamarqués: Periódico Oficial y Órgano de los Intereses del Estado (Bogotá, 1861).
