= Orlando Mejía Rivera =

- Born: August 30, 1961 (age 64); Bogotá
- Education: M.D., M.Phil.
- Occupation: physician
- Writing career
- Subject: thanatology

Orlando Mejía Rivera (born August 30, 1961) is a Colombian internist and graduated M.Phil., writer and thanatologist. He was born in Bogotá. Currently he lives in Manizales and is titular professor at the Universidad de Caldas faculty of medicine.

== Works ==
Essays

- Antropología de la muerte 1987
- Humanismo y antihumanismo, 1990
- Ética y sida', 1995
- De la prehistoria a la medicina egipcia: introducción crítica a la historia de la medicina, 1999
- La muerte y sus símbolos: muerte, tecnocracia y posmodernidad, 1999
- De clones, ciborgs y sirenas, 2000
- La generación mutante. nuevos narradores colombianos, 2002
- Los descubrimientos serendípicos : aproximaciones epistemológicas al contexto del descubrimiento científico, 2004
- Extraños escenarios de la noche: crónicas culturales, 2005
- En el jardín de Mendel : bioética, genética humana y sociedad, 2009
- Cronistas del futuro : ensayos sobre escritores de ciencia ficción, 2012
- La biblioteca del dragón : lecturas inolvidables, 2012

Fiction

- La Casa Rosada, 1997
- Pensamientos de guerra, 2000
- El asunto García y otros cuentos, 2006
- El enfermo de Abisinia, 2007
- Recordando a Bosé, 2009
- Manicomio de dioses, 2010
