= Pedro Medina Avendaño =

Colombian lawyer, poet, and lyricist

- Born: 14 September 1915; Cómbita, Boyacá, Colombia
- Died: 31 August 2012 (aged 96); Bogotá, D.C., Colombia
- Education: National University of Colombia
- Occupations: Lawyer, Political Scientist, writer
- Spouse(s): Sofia Torres Remolina (1944—2012)
- Writing career
- Language: Spanish language
- Genre: Lyric poetry
- Notable works: Anthem of Bogotá, Anthem of Boyacá
- Notable awards: Civil Order of Merit; Rank of Grand District Cross: City of Bogotá, 2002

Pedro Medina Avendaño (14 September 1915 – 31 August 2012) was a Colombian lawyer and poet, author of the Anthem of Bogotá and the Anthem of Boyacá, he was also known as the "Poet of the Anthems".

Medina, son of Pedro Medina Niño and Carmen Avendaño, married Sofia Torres Remolina in 1944. He attended school in Tunja at the Colegio Salesiano, and later attended the National University of Colombia, where he received a Doctorate of Laws, Political Science and Social Sciences, specialized in Penal and Administrative law.

In addition to authoring the anthems of Bogotá and Boyacá, he has composed the anthems of his native city of Cómbita, and Sogamoso, as well as the anthems of other institutions such as the anthem of Tunja's Lawyers Club, the anthem of the Colombian Liberal Party, the anthems of the Universidad Libre, La Gran Colombia University, Central University and the Colegio Mayor of Cundinamarca University, among many more. For his contributions, the City of Bogotá awarded Medina the Civil Order of Merit "City of Bogotá" in the rank of Grand District Cross for Distinguished Merit.

== Works ==
- Selección Poética [Poetic Selection]. Tunja: Academía Boyacense de Historia. 1994. OCLC 253576408.
- Las Breves Horas [The Short Hours]. Bogotá: Comercial Moderna. OCLC 14056639.
