= Eladio Vergara y Vergara =

Colombian Lawyer, writer

- Born: 1821
- Died: 1888 (aged 66–67)
- Education: Law
- Alma mater: Del Rosario University
- Spouse: Paulina Velasco Velasco
- Relatives: Jose Maria Vergara y Vergara
- Writing career
- Language: Spanish
- Period: 19th century
- Genre: Epic poetry
- Notable works: Guerra de Neo-Granada, El Mudo, El Misionero. Drama tradicional en tres actos [and in verse]. 1851, Capilla del Sagrario de Bogotá

Eladio Vergara y Vergara (1821–1888) was a Colombian writer, historian, chronicler and cultural administrator of the nineteenth century. He is best known for his work on colombia historial and literary institutions, his works on the Capilla del Sagrario de Bogotá and the epic poem "Guerra de Neo-Granada" first introduced in the political magazine "La Matricaria" created by prestigious writer Jose Maria Vergara y Vergara, his brother.

He was the son of Ignacio Manuel de Vergara, who preceded him as mayordomo-tesorero of the Capilla del Sagrario. Vergara belonged to a prominent New Granadan family deeply embedded in ecclesiastical, cultural, and intellectual life since the colonial period.

He received a classical education typical of Bogotá´s learned elites in the mid-nineteenth century, grounded in latin and ecclesiastical history and large colonial archives.

Eladio was also related by blood to General Tomas Cipriano de Mosquera. Served Colombia as Secretary of Finance of the State of Cauca

== Work ==
- Participated in the political newspaper "El Semanario" of general Mosquera.
- Guerra de Neo-Granada
- El Mudo
- El Misionero. Drama tradicional en tres actos [and in verse]. 1851
- Capilla del Sagrario de Bogotá
- El Oidor de Santa Fe, Roland o Bandido de San Lotario y Misionero
- Comic ¿Cuál Gobierno?
