= Octavio Escobar Giraldo =

Colombian physician and writer

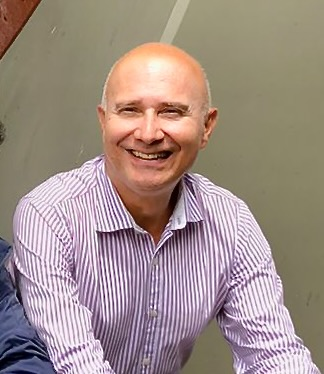
- Octavio Escobar Giraldo at the Manizales Book Fair, 2022
- Born: 1962 (age 63–64); Manizales, Colombia
- Notable work: Saide, Antes y después de Diós, De música lígera, Historias clínicas, Manual de hipocondría
- Style: Novel, Crime Thriller (Novela Negra), Poetry, Short Story

Octavio Escobar Giraldo (Manizales, Colombia, 1962) is a Colombian physician and writer. He won the International Short Novel Award Ciudad de Barbastro XLV (2014) and the National Award for Best Novel from the (Colombian) Ministry of Culture (2016) for Después y antes de Dios. His narrative style is substantially influenced by television, music, cinema because, as he himself states, he went more to the movies than to class. He is the Director of the Manizales Book Fair, which he founded in 2009. He is a professor at the graduate school of Fine Arts and Humanities at the University of Caldas, located in the city where he was born, Manizales, Colombia. His trio of noir novels (Saide, Destinos Intermediarios, and Cada Oscura Tumba) take on difficult social themes pertaining to the violence, the paramilitaries, and the false positives scandal (los falsos positivos), the over six thousand young people who were kidnapped and murdered by the Colombian military to meet quotas in the war against the guerrilla forces in the Colombian coffee growing axis (El Eje Cafetero), the mountainous region where the author was born and has spent his life.

== Novels ==
- El último diario de Tony Flowers (Universidad de Caldas, 1995).
- Saide (Periférica, 2007)), Awarded the Colombian National Prize for Best Noir Novel, translated into German and Italian
- El álbum de Mónica Pont (Universidad de Antioquia, 2003), winner of the VIII Biennial National Novel Biennial "José Eustasio Rivera".
- 1851. Folletín de cabo roto (Intermedio editores, 2007)
- Destinos intermediarios (Periférica, 2010)
- Cielo parcialmente nublado (Intermedio, 2013)
- Después y antes de Dios (Pre-Textos, 2014), translated into French as Après et avant Dieu (Actes, Sud, 2017), 2016 National Award for Best Novel from the Colombian Ministry of Culture.
- El mapa de Sara (Panamericana, 2016)
- Cada oscura tumba (Seix Barral, 2022), finalist for the 2023 Rodolfo Walsh Award for best non-fiction crime novel written in Spanish.
- Cassiani (Seix Barral, 2023)

== Collections of short fiction ==
- El color del agua (1993)
- Las láminas más difíciles del álbum (1995) awarded the Premio Confamiliar del Atlántico de Literatura Infantil y Juvenil
- La posada del Almirante Benbow (1997)
- De música ligera (Editorial Babilonia 1998), awarded the 1998 Colombian National Literature Prize by the Colombian Ministry of Culture.
- Hotel en Shangri-Lá (Panamericana 2002), awarded the National Short Fiction Prize by the University of Antioquia
- Cuentos (Editorial EAFIT 2015)
- Cuentos de ida y vuelta (2019), anthology with Mexican author Mónica Lavín

Escobar Giraldo's short fiction has been widely anthologized in Spanish and in other languages, including Bulgarian, Italian, and German.

== Poetry ==
- La manzana oxidada: tres poetas del viejo Caldas (1997), with Flobert Zapata and Alberto Verón (pseudonym of Alberto Antonio Berón Ospina)
- Historias clínicas (2016), awarded the National Poetry Prize of the Tertulia de Gloria Luz Gutiérrez
- Manual de hipocondría (Ediciones la Palma, 2022; Verso Libre, 2022), winner Premio Internacional de Poesía Las Palmas de Gran Canaria

== Editor ==
Cuento caldense actual (1993)

== Awards and Recognitions ==
- Premio Crónica Negra Colombiana, 2007
- Premio Comfamiliar del Atlántico de Literatura Infantil y Juvenil, 1994
- Premio Nacional de Literatura Ministerio de Cultura, 1997. Genre: short story
- Premio Nacional de Cuento. Universidad de Antioquia, 2002
- VIII Bienal Nacional de Novela José Eustasio Rivera. 2002
- Beca de creación del Ministerio de Cultura
- Premio internacional de novela corta Ciudad de Barbastro, 2014
- Premio Nacional de Novela del Ministerio de Cultura. 2016
- Premio de Poesía Ciudad de Las Palmas de Gran Canaria, 2021
