= University of Caldas =

Coordinates: 5°03′22″N 75°29′34″W

- Universidad de Caldas
- Motto: Lumina Spargo
- Type: Public
- Established: May 24, 1943
- Rector: Fabio Hernando Arias Orozco
- Students: 15.500 approx. (2018)
- Location: Manizales, Caldas, Colombia
- Campus: Sede principal Calle 65 #26-10 Ciudad Universitaria Manizales
- Colors: Blue, Gold and Red
- Nickname: UdeC
- Website: http://www.ucaldas.edu.co/

The University of Caldas (Spanish: Universidad de Caldas), is a public, coeducational, research university based in Manizales, Caldas, Colombia. It is the most important higher education institution in the Department of Caldas. It is a public university of national character, subject to inspection and surveillance through Law 1740 of 2014 and Law 30 of 1992 of the Ministry of Education of Colombia; it houses students from all corners of Colombia and abroad; It is considered the best university in the "eje cafetero" and one of the best in Colombia.

== Academic programs ==
=== Undergraduate ===
FACULTY OF AGRICULTURAL SCIENCES

- Agronomy
- Veterinary Medicine and Zootechnics

FACULTY OF LAW AND SOCIAL SCIENCES

- Anthropology
- Law
- Family Development
- Sociology
- Social Work
- BA in Social Studies
- History

FACULTY OF NATURAL AND EXACT SCIENCES

- Biology
- Geology
- BA in Biology and Chemistry
- Mecatronics Engineering
- Electronics Technology

FACULTY OF HEALTH SCIENCES

- Nursing
- BA in Physical Education, Recreation and Sports
- Medicine

FACULTY OF ENGINEERING

- Food Engineering
- Computers
- Systems Technology

FACULTY OF ARTS AND HUMANITIES

- Plastic Arts
- Visual Design
- Philosophy and Letters
- BA in Philosophy and Letters
- BA in Scenic Arts
- BA in Modern Languages
- BA in Music

=== Graduate ===
Graduate Doctoral Degrees

- Agricultural Sciences
- Biomedical Sciences
- Design and Interactive Creation
- Educational Sciences

Master's Degrees

- Agricultural Production Systems
- Biomedical Sciences
- Chemistry
- Culture and Drugs
- Design and Interactive Creation
- Earth Sciences
- Education
- English Didactics
- Family Studies and Development
- Fito pathology
- Gerontology
- Philosophy
- Rural Societies
- Social Sciences
- Veterinary Sciences

Specializations

- Administration and Evaluation
- Administrative Law
- Agribusiness Management
- Agro-industrial Development
- Anesthesiology
- Bovine Production systems
- Chemistry
- Clinic Geriatrics
- Clinical Gastroenterology
- Clinical Surgical Gastroenterology
- Commercial and Financial Legislation
- Computer Assisted Mathematics
- Criminal Studies
- Dermatology
- Family Relationships Intervention
- General Surgery
- Geotechnics
- Gynecology and Obstetrics
- Health Promotion
- Inter Agro-Alimentary Business
- Internal Medicine
- Ophthalmology
- Pediatric Surgery
- Pediatrics
- Psychiatry
- Rural Development
- Tax and Customs Legislation
- Technical and Economic Evaluation
- University Teaching

== Notable alumni ==
- Humberto de la Calle
- Elizabeth Castillo Vargas, LGBT activist and writer
- Alejandro Corrales Escobar, politician and engineer
- La Muchacha, musician, singer, and songwriter
- Lyda Osorio, physician, epidemiologist and infectious disease specialist

== See also ==
- List of universities in Colombia
