= Luisa Ballesteros Rosas =

Colombian essayist and poet

Luisa Ballesteros Rosas (born in 1957, Boavita, Colombia) is a Colombian essayist and poet. She currently lives in Paris and is a professor of Latin American Literature and Civilization at CY Cergy Paris University.

== Biography ==
Luisa Ballesteros Rosas was born in Boavita, Boyacá Department, Colombia and is of French-Colombian nationality. She has been living in Paris since the 1980s. She devotes her research to women writers, society and the history of the Latin American continent in both French and Spanish.

She completed her studies in Paris where she obtained the higher certificate in French, a doctorate in Iberian and Latin American studies and an Accreditation to Direct Research from the Paris-Sorbonne University. Rosas went on to teach Latin American literature and civilization there from 1995 to 1997 before becoming a HDR lecturer in Latin American literature and civilization at CY Cergy Paris University. and is the Director of the Department of Iberian and Latin American Studies. She devotes her research to women writers, society and the history of the Latin American continent.

=== Research centers and associations ===
Rosas is a member of the following:

- UMR Heritages of CY Cergy Paris University
- Center for interdisciplinary research on contemporary Iberian worlds (CRIMIC), Sorbonne University
- CSIC de Madrid
- Pen of writers of Colombia
- Academia Boyacense de la Lengua, a subsidiary of the Colombian Academy of Language.

== Published works ==
- La humedad del sol (short story), 1975
- La fiesta de las olas (poetry), 1976
- La Femme écrivain dans la société latino-américaine (essay), préface de Jean-Paul Duviols, Paris, Éditions L'Harmattan, 1994,
- Plume de colibri (collection of poems), édition bilingue, Paris, Éditions L'Harmattan, 1997
- La escritora en la sociedad latinoamericana, Santiago de Cali, Éditions Universidad del Valle, 1997
- Palabras de mujer (collection of poems), Mexico, Linajes Editores, 2000
- Memoria del ovido - Mémoire de l'oubli (collection of poems), édition bilingue, traduit de l'espagnol par Julián Garavito, Paris, Éditions L'Harmattan, 2001
- Diamant de la nuit - Diamante de la noche (collection of poems), édition bilingue, co-traducteur Claude d'Ornano, préface de Rubén Bareiro Saguier, illustrations de Francisco Rocca, Paris, Éditions Caractères, 2003
- De l'autre côté du rêve - Al otro lado del sueño (collection of poems), édition bilingue, Paris, Éditions L’Harmattan, 2011.
- Cuando el llanto no llega, Madrid, Grupo Editorial Sial Pigmalión, 2017 ISBN 978-84-17043-46-9
- Las escritoras y la historia de América Latina, Santiago de Cali, Editions Universidad del Valle, 2017
- Historia de Iberoamérica en las obras de sus escritoras, Madrid, Grupo Editorial Sial Pigmalión ISBN 978-84-17397-17-3 Prix International de Littérature Virginia Woolf 2018, avec l'ensemble de son œuvre. Prix du meilleur essai littéraire à la Feria Internacional del Libro de Madrid 2018.
- Representaciones literarias de las Independencias iberoamericanas (Dir.), Madrid, Sial Pigmalion 2018 ISBN 978-84-17397-43-2
- Francia-Colombia: miradas cruzadas (Dir.), Madrid, Sial / Trivium, Sial Pigmalión 2021 ISBN 978-84-18333-54-5

== See also ==
- Latin American literature
- Latin American poetry
