= Albalucía Ángel =

Colombian novelist

- Born: Albalucía Ángel Marulanda; September 7, 1939 (age 86) Pereira, Risaralda, Colombia
- Occupation: Writer and art critic
- Genres: Poetry, novel, play, short story, essay.

Albalucía Ángel Marulanda (born 27 September 1939) is a Colombian writer, folksinger and novelist of the Latin American Boom. She is known as a pioneer of Latin American postmodernism for her novels.

== Life and career ==
Ángel was born in Pereira to an upper-middle-class family. She studied Art History at the University of the Andes in Bogotá, where she was a student of the art critic Marta Traba. In 1964 she traveled to Europe, where she pursued studies in the Arts and Letters at La Sorbonne and later studied cinema at the University of Rome. She worked as a folk singer in Europe and turned to writing in the late 1960s. Her first novel was Girasoles en Invierno ("Sunflowers in Winter"). She has written poems, essays, and novels. Many of her works have a feminist perspective, with themes of women's rights and women's history. She has lived in Europe since 1964, and in London since 1980.

== Works ==
- 1970 Girasoles en Invierno (novel)
- 1972 Dos Veces Alicia (novel)
- 1975 Estaba la Pájara Pinta Sentada en el Verde Limón (novel)
- 1975 Libros de Arte (art essays)
- 1979 ¡Oh, Gloria Inmarcesible! (short stories)
- 1981 Visión del Arte (art essays)
- 1982 Misiá Señora (novel)
- 1984 Las Andariegas (novel)
- 1991 Siete Lunas y un Espejo (play)
- 2002 Tierra de Nadie (novel)

She has also written numerous articles for newspapers and magazines like Diario del Caribe, La Nueva Prensa, and El Espectador.

== Prizes and awards ==
In 1966 she was a finalist in the Esso Contest for Girasoles en Invierno. Her novel Estaba la Pájara Pinta Sentada en el Verde Limón won the novel of the year award from the magazine Vivencias de Cali. The Third Conference on Colombian Women Writers in 2006 was dedicated to her works.

== Personal life ==
Ángel married and later separated from Chilean author Mauricio Wacquez.
