= Central University (Colombia) =

Private university in Bogotá, Colombia

Central University Colombia
- UCentral
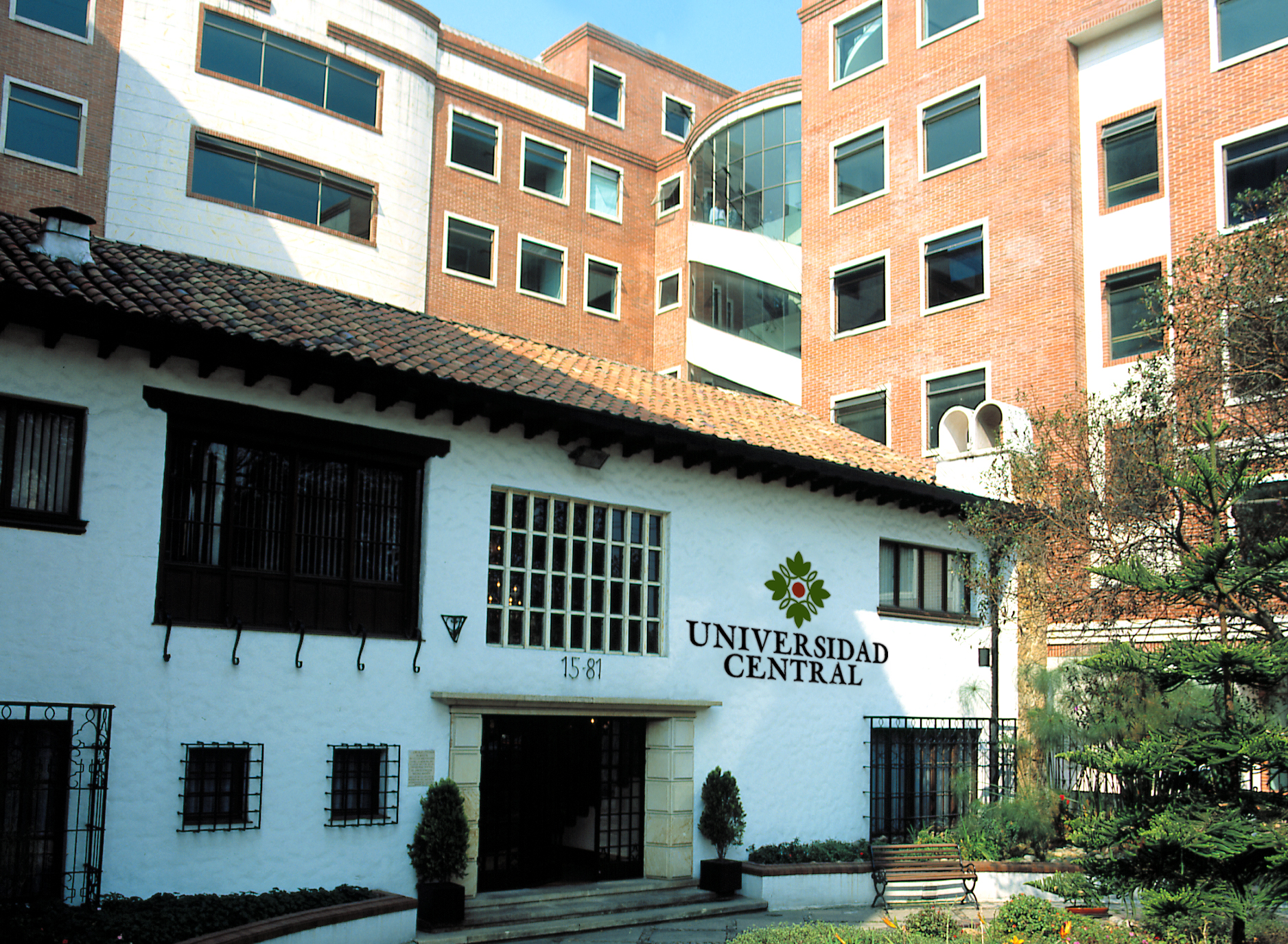
- Seal of the Central University Colombia
- Other names: La Central, Unicentral
- Type: Private
- Established: 1966
- Rector: Rafael Santos Calderón
- Administrative staff: 896
- Students: 8639
- Location: Carrera 5 No 21–38 (Sede Centro); Carrera 15 No 75–74 (Sede Norte), Bogotá, Colombia; 4°36′04.23″N 74°3′56.38″W
- Campus: Urban, 1,437 acres (582 ha)
- Website: www.ucentral.edu.co

The Central University (Universidad Central) is a private institution of higher education established 1966, whose two offices are at Bogotá, Colombia. It offers undergraduate and graduate programs in the areas of humanities, arts, economic and administrative sciences and engineering.

== History ==
Central University was founded in 1966 by a group of Colombian educators seeking to expand access to higher education for all sectors of society. On 30 June of that year, Raul Vasquez Velez, Ruben Reyes Amaya, Alberto Gomez Moreno, Eduardo Varela Mendoza, Tellez Elberto Camacho, Jorge Enrique Molina and Darío Samper, signed the act establishing the Central University Foundation.

== Symbol ==
The image of the university was built on the curubo leaf (Passiflora mollissima tripartite), a creeper of family Passifloraceae, which is native to tropical and temperate South America.

Because it is an indigenous plant and strongly linked to culture, traditional medicine and food of the aboriginal communities of pre-Columbian America, the curubo is an ideal symbol for the university.

The four sheets curubo symbolize the four main functions of this university: teaching, research, extension and preservation of natural and cultural heritage. The orientation of the leaves (each of which points to one of the main directions of the compass rose) expresses the ideas of universality, diversity and plurality.

== Anthem ==
The hymn was composed by Pedro Medina Avendaño, who is also author of the hymns of Bogotá and the department of Boyacá, among others.

The anthem was played at the start of the solemn university events (e.g., possession of the Rector, the welcoming ceremony for students at the beginning of the semester, the ceremony of awards for meritorious service to the academic and administrative staff, and graduation ceremonies). The hymn is also used at the beginning of university ceremonies and the opening of buildings.

== Headquarters ==
Central University of Bogota has two locations:

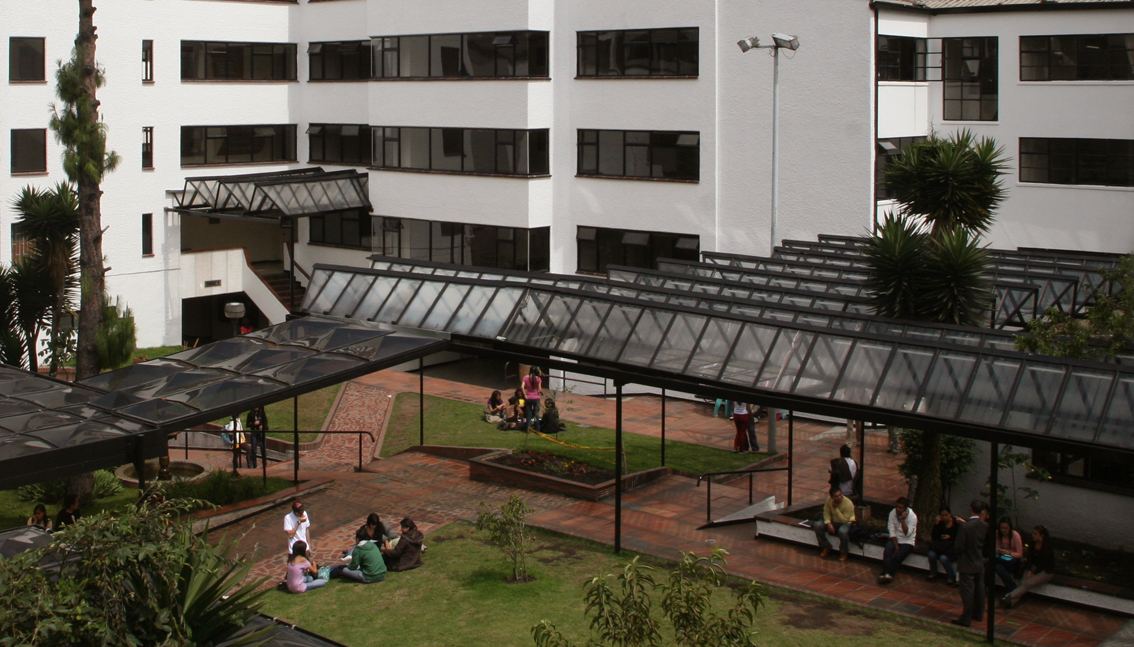
Accounting building of the Central University

== Center Seat ==
Located in Race 5 No 21 - 38 in Bogotá the site has the Rectory, the Vicerrectorías, most of the races of the Faculty of Administrative Sciences, Economics and Accounting, Faculty of Engineering and some programs of the Faculty of Social Sciences Humanities and Arts.

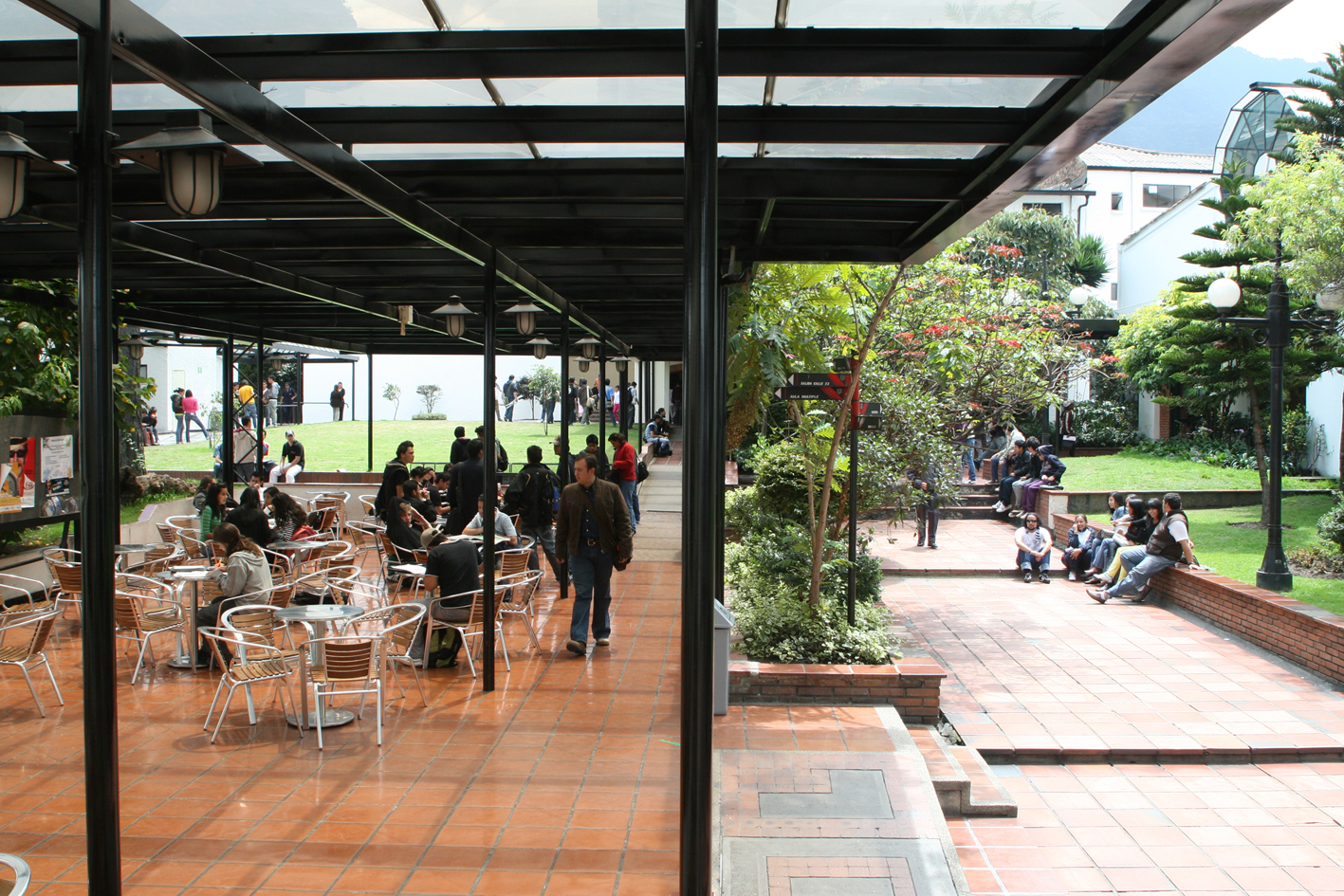
Malecon

In the vicinity of the venue, the university has rooms for students of Musical Studies to conduct their instrumental practices.

== Northern headquarters ==
Also in Bogotá but in the north, located at Calle 75 No 16-03, which are active most of the schools attached to the Faculty of Social Sciences Humanities and Arts, composed of social communication and journalism and publicity.

In 2011 it incorporated the undergraduate in Film directed by Lisandro Duque Naranjo Colombian film director born in Sevilla, Valle on October 30, 1943. He was director of the International School of Film and Television. He collaborated with Gabriel García Márquez in conducting film projects, including Mary (TV series), Miracle in Rome and Invisible Children. Duque Naranjo is columnist for The Spectator and professor at the Central University and the National University.

In the building of the Carrera 15 No 75-74 graduate programs work and the Institute of Contemporary Social Studies (IESCO) is an academic unit attached to the Faculty of Social Sciences, Humanities and Arts, whose function is linked to research issues and debates in social science and training in these areas, graduate and undergraduate levels.

== Undergraduates ==
The Central University has three faculties and 15 programs undergraduate.

== Faculty of Social Sciences Humanities and Arts ==
=== Drama ===
In 2005, the Free Theatre and the Central University signed an agreement to develop the Program of Dramatic Art. The Drama Department train professionals in the classic and repertory theater and in the contemporary scene.

In the country there are several schools and universities that offer programs in drama, but none of these programs has the distinction of producing a national tour in the latter half of the race, the Drama Department, taking the development of the School of the Theatre Libre, has been doing national tours of students for eight years from 8 ° level of their undergraduate program.

=== Social Communication and Journalism ===
By internal agreement 2 May 27, 1978, signed by the Council of the University, the School of Information Science was created, which was intended to develop academic and professional proposals in the areas of communication, advertising, journalism and marketing. The unit was then divided into the School of Advertising, Market aspects Faculty and the Faculty of Social Communication and Journalism, the latter responsible for the Program in Communication and Journalism. The Institute for the Promotion of Higher Education, ICFES by agreeing 183 August 4, 1984, granted license to operate the program of Social Communication and Journalism at the Central University Foundation and gave final approval by Resolution 1652 of 5 August 1987.

In the beginning, the curriculum proposals were closely linked to the traditional way that focused field programs in Colombia (with an emphasis in journalism). In fact, the program began with the intention of becoming a school of journalism that qualify the performance of these professionals in this environment (curriculum 9005). Over time the department expanded itself to other fields of communication, enabling it to provide basic training and specialized in the fields of journalism and communication professionals organization (curriculum 1048 and 1050, with adjustments in the plans 1049, 1051).

=== Creative Writing ===
This program creative writing based on narrative, poetry and essays.

=== Music Studies ===
The Musical Studies Program began its work in January 1995. The school emerged as the result of an agreement between the Central University and the National Youth Orchestra of Colombia. The program is attached to the Faculty of Social Sciences, Humanities and Arts.

The operating agreement with the National Youth Orchestra of Colombia was terminated in 2005.

=== Advertising ===
The Technical Program in Advertising and Sales was created in 1966. Since 1975, through the 189 Agreement ICFES, a Technology Program in Advertising and Marketing was created. The department was the first in Colombia to offer a Professional Program in Advertising in 1990. The professional program was revised and renewed in 1998.

In 2007, the program assumed the flexible system of credits. That same year, the program received the Qualified Registration issued by the Ministry of Education, through Resolution 2459. Since 2005, the Publicity Department has been attached to the Faculty of Social Sciences, Humanities and Arts.

=== Cinema ===
The Film program educates in documentary and fiction, and audiovisual narrative.

Other programs are Advertising, Drama, Musical Studies and Creative Writing.

The Central University undergraduate film has been launched. The program will be directed by screenwriter and film director Lisandro Duque Naranjo, who also has been Director General of the International School of Film and Television of San Antonio de los Baños (EICTV) and professor of Creative Writing MA at the University National.

In addition to this producer, new teachers will include Fernando Velez Garcia, film director and film photography who also served for twenty years as a professor in the School Film of the National University Prieto Ignacio Carvajal, documentary, visual anthropology expert and author of books like Anthropology and image, color theory and the Divine proportion, and Jan Meurkens, Dutch ethnographic documentary, director of the Colombian section of the festival documentary film "Beeld Voor Beeld."

The Central University has a cultural complex in the center of Bogotá, with rooms for film projection. The university has the oldest university film club Colombia, and hosts major national and international film festivals.

== See also ==
- List of universities in Colombia
