= Hortensia Antommarchi =

Colombian poet

- Born: 1850; Cúcuta, Republic of New Granada
- Died: 1915 (aged 64–65); Cúcuta, Colombia
- Occupation: Poet
- Spouse: Vásquez

Hortensia Antommarchi (1850 – 1915, in Cúcuta, Colombia) was a Colombian poet who published numerous poems. Hortensia's sisters, Dorila Antommarchi and Elmira Antommarchi, were also published poets. Hortensia died in 1915 in Cúcuta, Colombia.

== See also ==
- François Carlo Antommarchi
