= Dorila Antommarchi =

Colombian poet

- Born: 1850s Cúcuta, Colombia
- Died: 1923; Cúcuta, Colombia
- Occupation: Poet
- Spouse: Milcíades de Rojas

Dorila Antommarchi de Rojas (1850s – 1923) published numerous poems and sometimes used the pseudonym Colombiana. All her poems appear in various anthologies. Her sisters, Hortensia Antommarchi and Elmira Antommarchi, were also published poets.

She died in her native town of Cúcuta.

== See also ==
- François Carlo Antommarchi
