= Elmira Antommarchi =

Colombian poet

- Born: Cúcuta, Colombia
- Died: Cúcuta, Colombia
- Occupation: Poet

Elmira Antommarchi (born in Cúcuta, Colombia) was a Colombian poet who published numerous poems. All her poems appear in various anthologies. Elmira's sisters, Hortensia Antommarchi and Dorila Antommarchi, were also published poets. Elmira died in Cúcuta, Colombia.

== See also ==
- François Carlo Antommarchi
