= Orietta Lozano =

Colombian poet (born 1956)

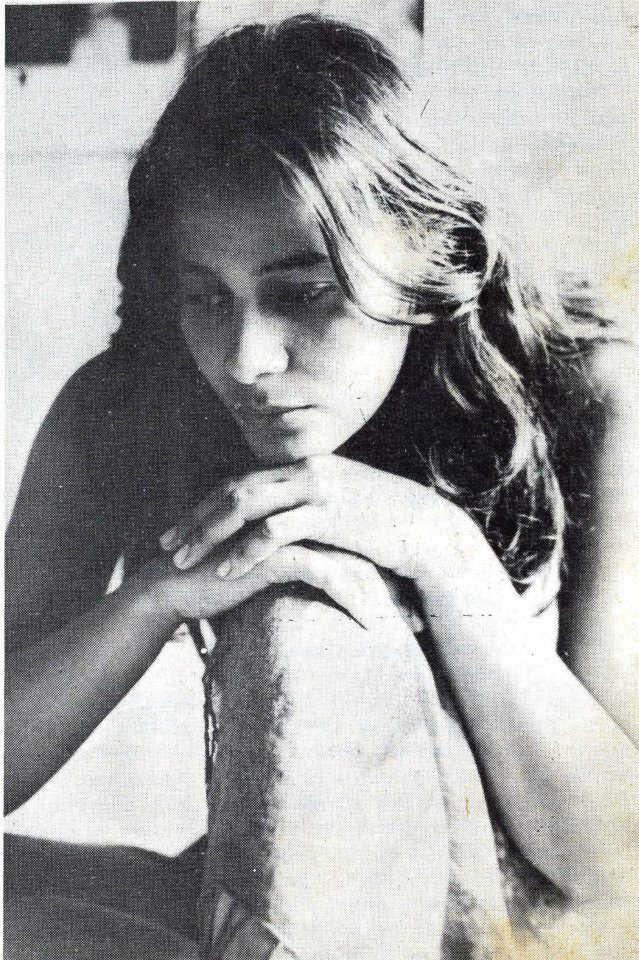
- Born: 1956 (age 69–70); Cali
- Occupation: Poet
- Writing career
- Notable awards: Eduardo Cote Lamus national prize

Orietta Lozano (born 1956) is a contemporary Colombian poet.

Orietta Lozano was born in Cali, Colombia. Lozano served as director of the Biblioteca Municipal del Centenario in Cali. She has been awarded the Eduardo Cote Lamus national prize for her poetry in 1986 and the award for best erotic verse by the Silva Poetry House in 1993. Lozano was invited to the 13th Biennale Internationale des Poètes in Paris in 1995. Her poetry is noted for its sensuality and eroticism.

== Selected works ==
Books

- Fuego secreto (1980)
- Memoria de los espejos (1983)
- El vampiro esperado (1987)
- Antología de Alejandra Pizarnik (Ensayo, 1992)
- Luminar (Novela, 1994)
- Antología amorosa (1996)
- El solar de la esfera (2002)
- Agua ebria (2005)
- Peldaños de agua (2010)
- Resplandor del Abismo (2011)
- Albacea de la Luz (2015)

== Awards ==
- Eduardo Cote Lamus National Poetry Award, 1986
- Aurelio Arturo National Poetry Award, 1992
- Best Erotic Verse, Casa de Poesía Silva, 1994

== Quotes ==
- "Escribo para ver el resplandor"
