= Claudia Ulloa =

Peruvian writer (born 1979)

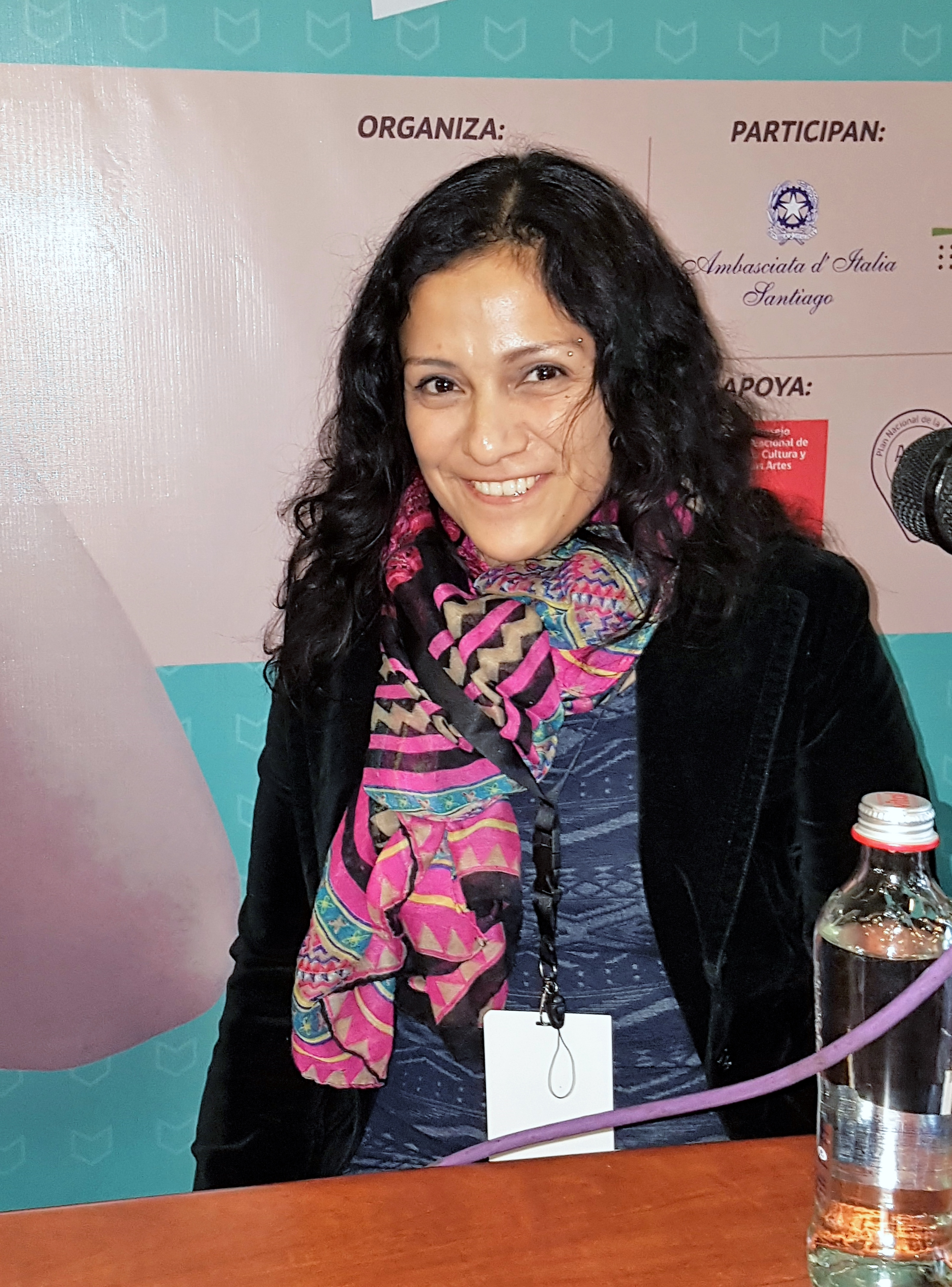
Ulloa in 2017

Claudia Ulloa Donoso (born 6 September 1979) is a Peruvian writer. She was born in Lima, and studied tourism in her native Peru before studying Spanish at the University of Tromsø.

== Career ==
Her published work includes the short story collections El pez que aprendió a caminar and Pajarito, as well as Séptima Madrugada based on the weblog of the same name. In 2017, she was living in the north of Norway when she was included in the Bogota39 list of the most promising young writers in Latin America. The other 38 included Samanta Schweblin, the Brazilian Mariana Torres, Gabriela Jauregui from Mexico, Liliana Colanzi from Bolivia and the Argentinians María José Caro, Luciana Sousa and Lola Copacabana.
