= Luciana Sousa =

Argentine writer (born 1986)

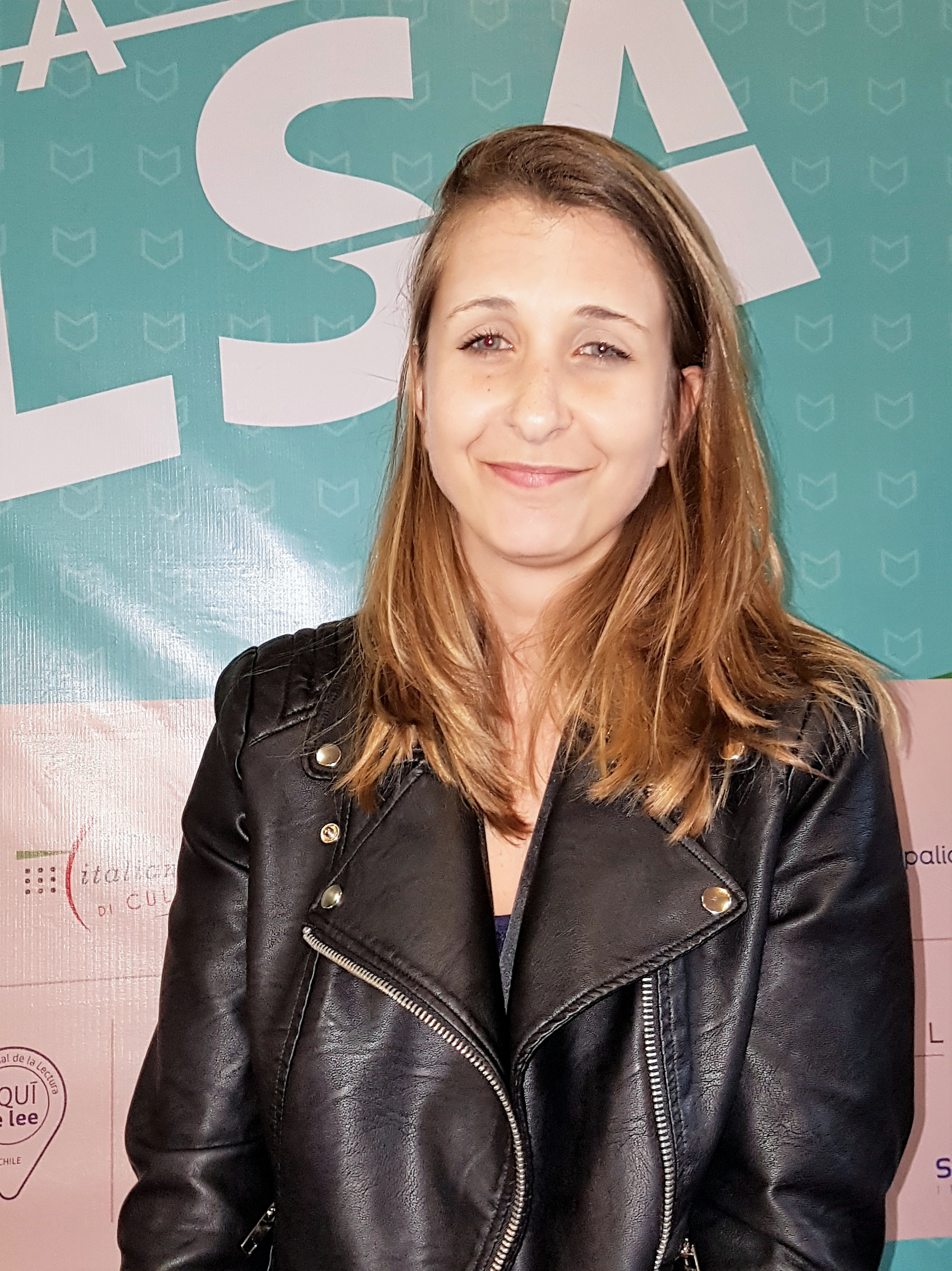
Luciana Sousa at FILSA 2017.

Luciana Sousa (born 1986) is an Argentine writer. Her debut novel was called Luro (Editorial Funesiana, 2016).

In 2017, at the Hay Festival she was named as one of the best Latin American writers under 39 as part of the Bogota39 project on the basis of that novel. The other 38 included Samanta Schweblin, the Brazilians Mariana Torres and Gabriela Jauregui, Liliana Colanzi from Bolivia, Mónica Ojeda from Ecuador and fellow Argentines María José Caro and Lola Copacabana.
