= Bogotá39 =

Collaborative project between the Hay Festival and Bogotá

Bogotá39 was a collaborative project between the Hay Festival and Bogotá: UNESCO World Book Capital City 2007 in order to identify 39 of the most promising Latin American writers under the age of 39. The judges for the contest were three Colombian writers: Piedad Bonnett, Héctor Abad Faciolince and Óscar Collazos. The success of this project led to a similar project two years later called Beirut39, which selected 39 of the most promising writers from the Arab world. Africa39 followed in 2014.

== The 2007 list ==
- Adriana Lisboa (Brazil)
- Alejandro Zambra (Chile)
- Álvaro Bisama (Chile)
- Álvaro Enrigue (Mexico)
- Andrés Neuman (Argentina)
- Antonio García Angel (Colombia)
- Antonio Ungar (Colombia)
- Carlos Wynter Melo (Panama)
- Claudia Amengual (Uruguay)
- Claudia Hernández González (El Salvador)
- Daniel Alarcón (Peru)
- Eduardo Halfon (Guatemala)
- Ena Lucía Portela (Cuba)
- Fabrizio Mejía Madrid (Mexico)
- Gabriela Alemán (Ecuador)
- Gonzalo Garcés (Argentina)
- Guadalupe Nettel (Mexico)
- Iván Thays (Peru)
- João Paulo Cuenca (Brazil)
- John Jairo Junieles (Colombia)
- Jorge Volpi (Mexico)
- José Pérez Reyes (Paraguay)
- Juan Gabriel Vásquez (Colombia)
- Junot Díaz (Dominican Republic)
- Karla Suárez (Cuba)
- Leonardo Valencia (Ecuador)
- Pablo Casacuberta (Uruguay)
- Pedro Mairal (Argentina)
- Pilar Quintana (Colombia)
- Ricardo Silva (Colombia)
- Rodrigo Blanco Calderón (Venezuela)
- Rodrigo Hasbún (Bolivia)
- Ronaldo Menéndez (Cuba)
- Santiago Nazarian (Brasil)
- Santiago Roncagliolo (Peru)
- Slavko Župčić (Venezuela)
- Veronica Stigger (Brasil)
- Wendy Guerra (Cuba)
- Yolanda Arroyo Pizarro (Puerto Rico)

== The 2017 list ==
- Carlos Manuel Álvarez (Cuba)
- Frank Báez (Dominican Republic)
- Natalia Borges Polesso (Brazil)
- Giuseppe Caputo (Colombia)
- Juan Cárdenas (Colombia)
- Mauro Javier Cárdenas (Ecuador)
- María José Caro (Peru)
- Martín Felipe Castagnet (Argentina)
- Liliana Colanzi (Bolivia)
- Juan Esteban Constaín (Colombia)
- Lola Copacabana (Argentina)
- Gonzalo Eltesch (Chile)
- Diego Erlan (Argentina)
- Daniel Ferreira (Colombia)
- Carlos Fonseca Suárez (Costa Rica)
- Damián González Bertolino (Uruguay)
- Sergio Gutiérrez Negrón (Puerto Rico)
- Gabriela Jauregui (Mexico)
- Laia Jufresa (Mexico)
- Mauro Libertella (Argentina)
- Brenda Lozano (Mexico)
- Valeria Luiselli (Mexico)
- Alan Mills (Guatemala)
- Emiliano Monge (Mexico)
- Mónica Ojeda (Ecuador)
- Eduardo Plaza (Chile)
- Eduardo Rabasa (Mexico)
- Felipe Restrepo Pombo (Colombia)
- Juan Manuel Robles (Peru)
- Cristian Romero (Colombia)
- Juan Pablo Roncone (Chile)
- Daniel Saldaña París (Mexico)
- Samanta Schweblin (Argentina)
- Jesús Miguel Soto (Venezuela)
- Luciana Sousa (Argentina)
- Mariana Torres (Brazil)
- Valentín Trujillo (Uruguay)
- Claudia Ulloa (Peru)
- Diego Zúñiga (Chile)
