= Natalia Borges Polesso =

Brazilian writer

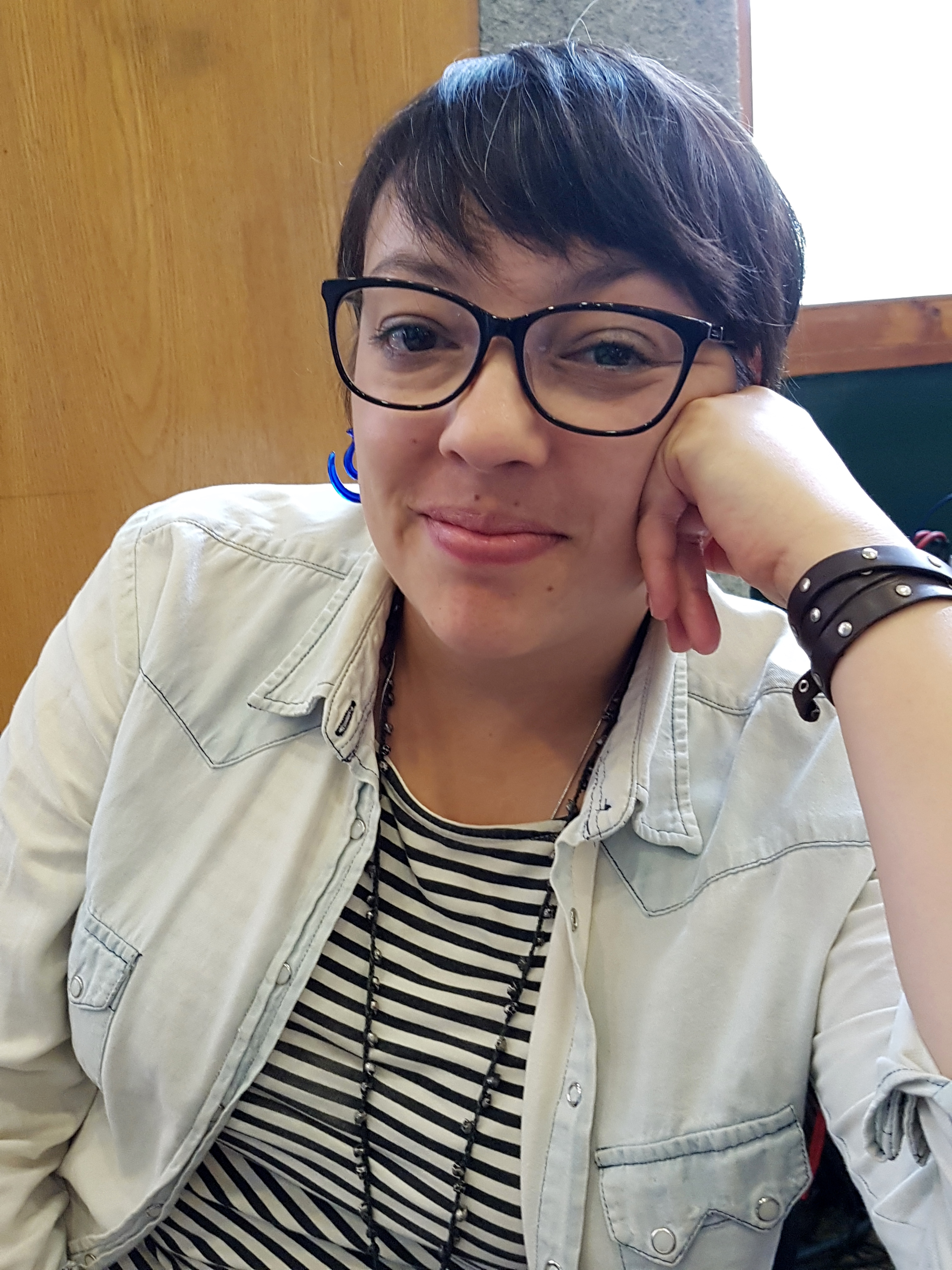
Polesso, Natalia Borges -FILSA 20171105 fRF

Natália Borges Polesso is a Brazilian writer.

== Life ==
She was born in Bento Goncalves in 1981. She obtained a PhD from the Pontifical Catholic University of Rio Grande do Sul (Porto Alegre). She has published three books to date. She also writes for the Caxias do Sul newspaper Pioneiro and pens the online comic strip A Escritora Incompreendida.

In 2017, she was named as one of the Bogota39, a list of the 39 most promising young writers in Latin America. The other 38 included Samanta Schweblin, the Brazilian Gabriela Jauregui, María José Caro from Peru, Liliana Colanzi from Bolivia and Lola Copacabana.

== Selected works ==
- 2013 - Recortes para álbum de fotografia sem gente - stories (Modelo de Nuvem), winner of the Açorianos de Literatura prize
- 2015 - Coração à corda - poetry (Patuá)
- 2016 - Amora - stories (Não Editora), winner of the Açorianos de Literatura prize and the Prémio Jabuti
- 2021 - A Extinção das Abelhas - novel (Companhia das Letras)
