= Cristian Romero (disambiguation) =

Cristian Romero (born 1998), is an Argentine footballer.

Cristian Romero may also refer to:

- Cristián Romero (Chilean footballer) (born 1963), Chilean footballer
- Cristian Romero (Paraguayan footballer) (born 1989), Paraguayan footballer
- Cristian Romero (writer) (fl. 21st century), Colombian fiction writer
