= Carlos Manuel Álvarez =

Cuban writer

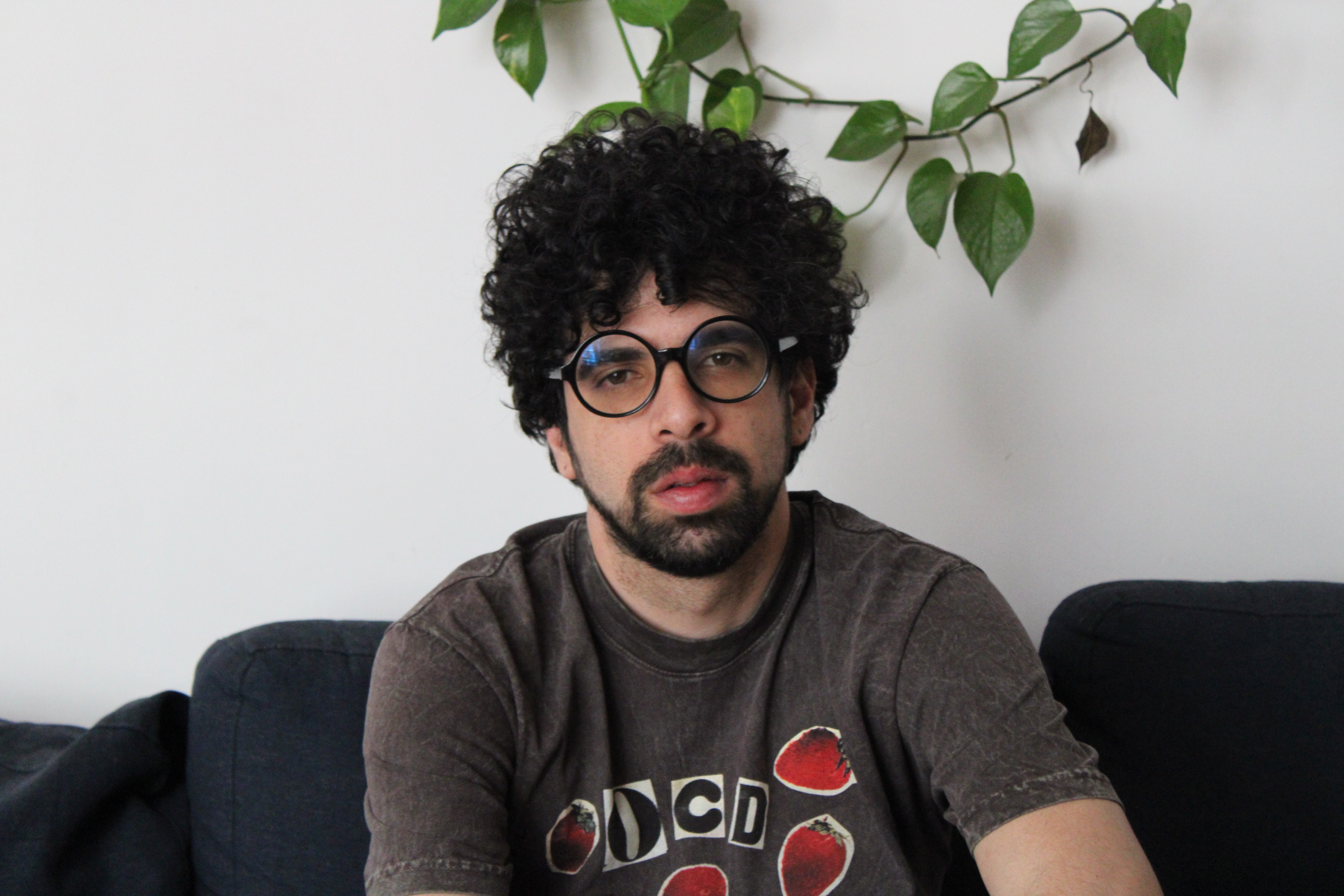
Carlos Manuel Álvarez, 2023

Carlos Manuel Álvarez (born 1989) is a Cuban writer.

== Early life and education ==
Alvarez was born in Matanzas and studied journalism at the University of Havana.

== Writing career ==
In 2016, he cofounded the online magazine El Estornudo. He has published journalistic and opinion pieces in outlets such as the New York Times, BBC and Al Jazeera, and his stories have appeared in Gatopardo and El Malpensante. He won the 2013 Calendario Prize for his short story collection La tarde de los sucesos definitivos. In 2017, he published La tribu. Retratos de Cuba, a collection of journalistic pieces on Cuba.

In 2016 he was named as one of the 20 best Latin American writers at the Guadalajara Book Fair and the following year, he was included in the Bogota39 list of the most promising young Latin American writers.

In 2020 he was arrested by the police in Havana, for reasons believed to be related to his journalistic activities and his participation in the San Isidro Movement.

== Books ==
- The Fallen: A Novel, 2019. Translated by Frank Wynne, published by Fitzcarraldo Editions.
- The Tribe: Portraits of Cuba, 2021, a collection of essays about post-Castro Cuba, translated by Frank Wynne, to be published by Fitzcarraldo Editions
