= Juan Manuel Robles =

Peruvian writer

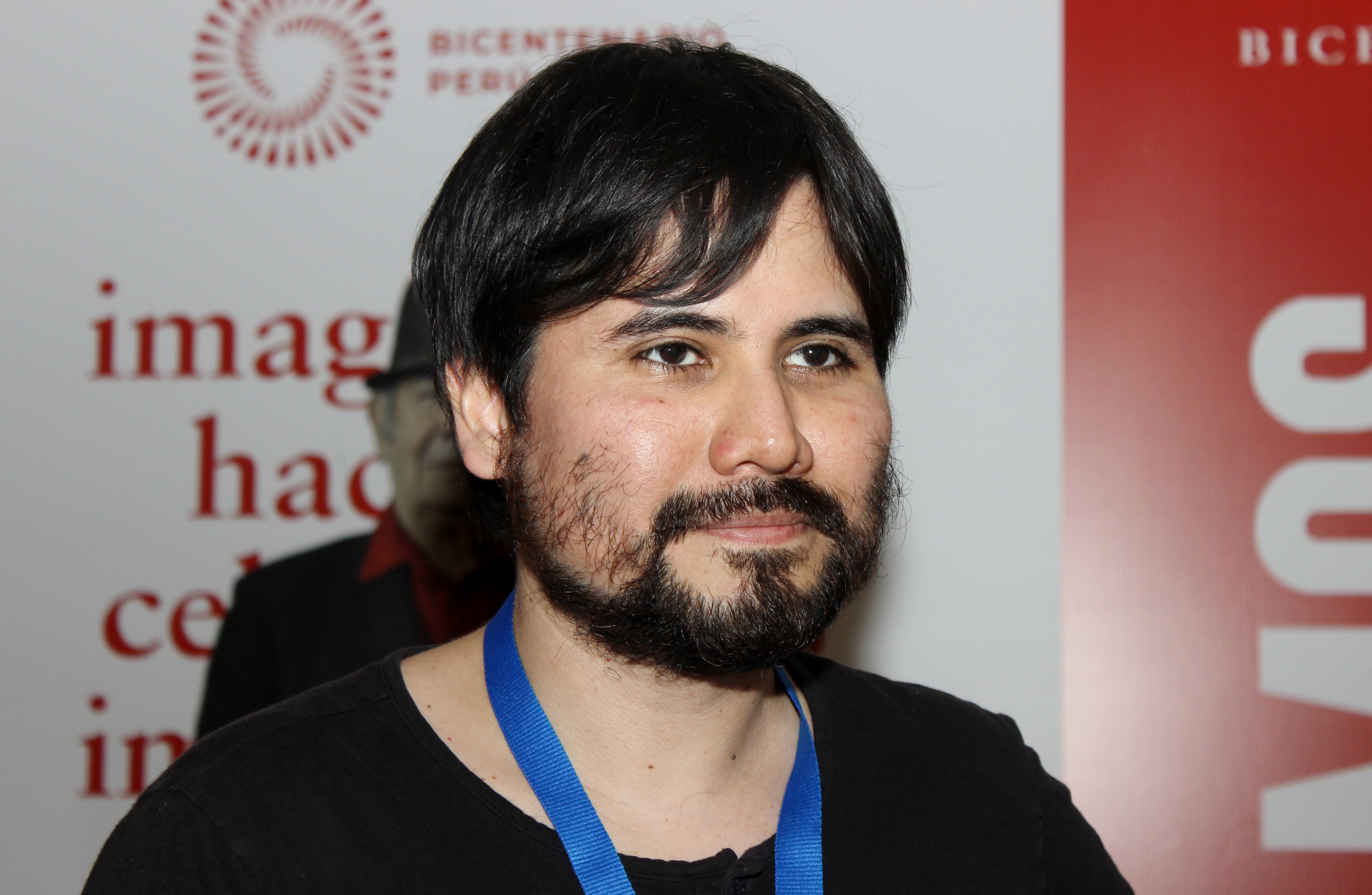
Juan Manuel Robles

Juan Manuel Robles (born 1978) is a Peruvian writer. He was born in Lima and obtained an MFA in Creative Writing in Spanish from New York University. His novel Nuevos juguetes de la guerra fría (Seix Barral, 2015) received critical acclaim, as did his more recent work No somos cazafantasmas (Seix Barral, 2018). In 2017, he was named as one of the Bogota39, a selection of the best young writers in Latin America.

He now lives in Lima, where he is a contributor to journals such as Gatopardo, Letras Libres, Etiqueta Negra, and Courrier International.
