= Valentín Trujillo =

Valentín Trujillo may refer to:

- Valentín Trujillo (writer), Uruguayan writer
- Valentín Trujillo (actor), Mexican actor, writer and director
- Valentín Trujillo (pianist), Chilean pianist and arranger of popular music
