= Alan Mills =

Alan Mills may refer to:

- Alan Mills (baseball) (born 1966), American professional baseball player
- Alan Mills (musician) (c.1912–1977), Canadian folksinger, writer and actor
- Alan Mills (tennis) (1935–2024), English tennis player and referee
- Alan Mills (poet) (born 1979), Guatemalan poet and writer
- Alan Mills, a character in EastEnders
- Alan Mills, a member of British band Coast to Coast

== See also ==
- Allan Mills, Ontario
