= Fabrizio Mejía =

Mexican writer and journalist (born 1968)

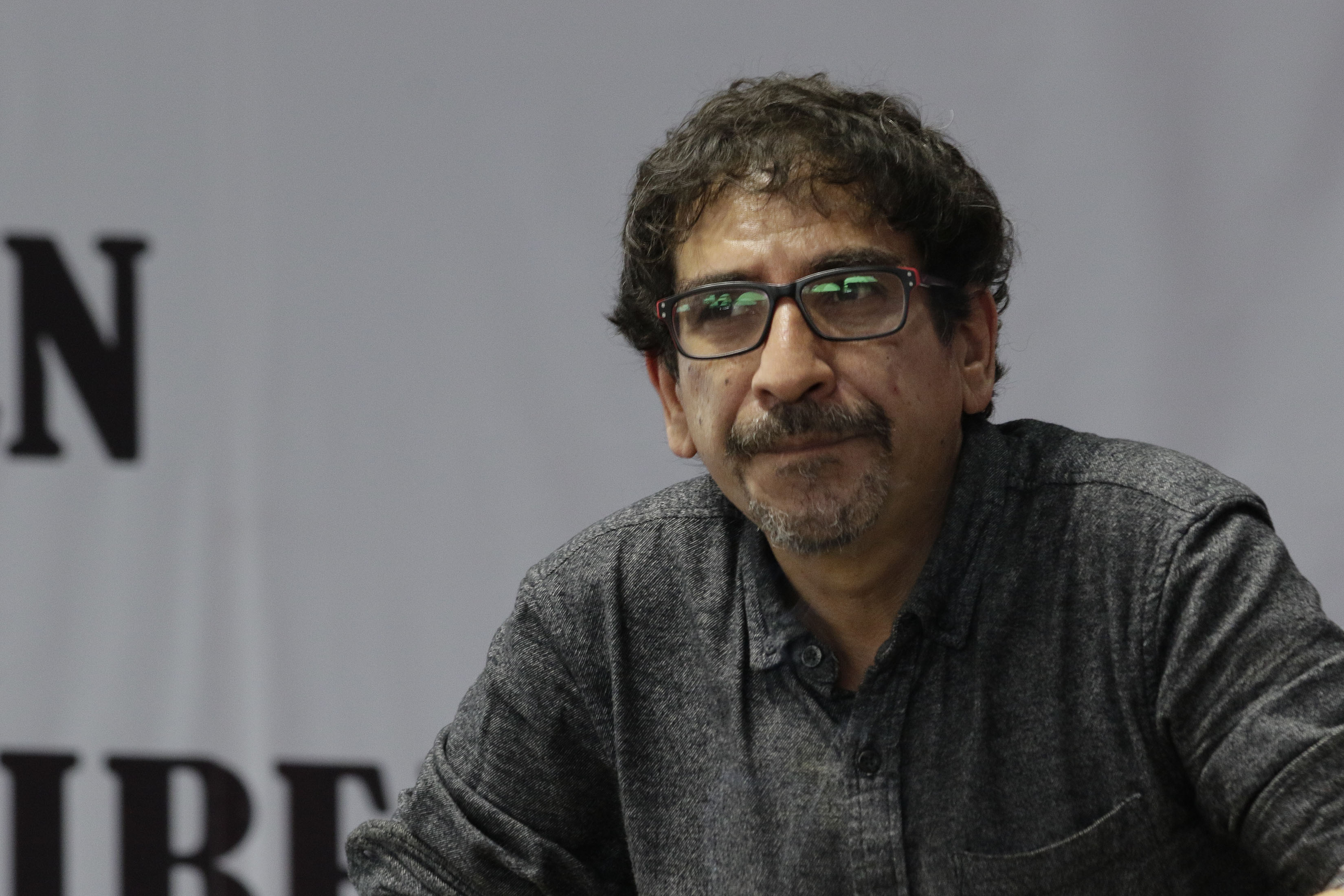
Fabrizio Mejía Madrid on 2018

Fabrizio Mejía Madrid (born 1968) is a Mexican writer and journalist from Mexico City.

== Works ==
Fabrizio Mejía Madrid writes for the Mexican political magazine Proceso. He also contributes in the magazines Letras Libres, Gatopardo, Chilango, and the cultural pages of the Reforma newspaper. His work was included in the anthologies The Mexico City Reader (University of Wisconsin Press, 2004), and A Ustedes les consta, the reunion of Mexican chronicles edited by Carlos Monsiváis (Era, 2006). For fifteen years he has written a literary column in the Mexican newspaper La Jornada. He has published three books of chronicles; Pequeños actos de disobediencia civil (1996), Entre las sábanas (1995) and Salida de emergencia (Random House, 2007), and two novels, Hombre al agua (Joaquín Mortiz, 2004) winner of the Antonin Artaud Prize for best novel, and El rencor (Planeta, 2006). Recently a committee in Bogotá, International Capital of the Book, shortlisted Mejía Madrid, along with Jorge Volpi and Álvaro Enrigue, as one of the 39 writers under forty that will define Latin American literature in the 21st century.Hay Festival, Bogotá 39, 2007.

== Charges of plagiarism ==
On April 27, 2019, writer Guillermo Sheridan published an article entitled "Fabrizio Mejía Madrid: el arte de no dar crédito" in the Mexican literary magazine Letras Libres, in which he accuses Mejía Madrid of plagiarizing numerous portions of the book Representations of the Intellectual by Edward Said. Sheridan documents how, in the essay "El Intelectual", Mejía Madrid takes extended portions of Said's original text without crediting the author, or citing Said's work.

In a more recent piece in the same publication Guillermo Sheridan has again demonstrated the extensive nature of Mejía Madrid's plagiarisms, this time by exposing how he has taken material from authors such as Deleuze, Isaacson, Douglas Day, Alain Corbin, and Giorgio Agamben without quoting them or giving any sort of credit.

On October 6, 2019, Mejía Madrid addressed these accusations on his column in Proceso, and Guillermo Sheridan replied again.

== See also ==
- Bogota39
