= Mariana Torres =

Mariana Torres may refer to:

- Mariana Torres (actress) (born 1985), Mexican actress
- Mariana Torres (writer) (born 1981), Brazilian writer and film director
