= Felipe Restrepo Pombo =

Colombian journalist and writer

- Occupations: Journalist and writer
- Known for: Worked for numerous magazines
- Notable work: Formas de evasión

Felipe Restrepo Pombo is a Colombian journalist and writer. He studied literature at university and started his journalistic career in the news magazine Cambio, working alongside Gabriel García Márquez. He has worked for numerous magazines, among them Paris Match, Esquire, Semana, Arcadia, El Espectador and Gente magazine. Most recently, he served as editor-in-chief of Gatopardo magazine of Mexico City.

He has published in a number of fiction and non-fiction genres, including a novel Formas de evasión (Seix Barral, 2016) and a biography of the artist Francis Bacon titled Retrato de una pesadilla (Panamericana, 2008). In 2017 he was named as one of the Bogotá39, a list of the best young writers in Latin America.

Restrepo Pombo was a fellow at the Fundación Prensa y Democracia at Iberoamerican University and attended workshops at the Fundación Nuevo Periodismo with Tomás Eloy Martínez, Carlos Monsiváis and Martín Caparrós.
