= Mariana Torres (writer) =

Brazilian writer (born 1981)

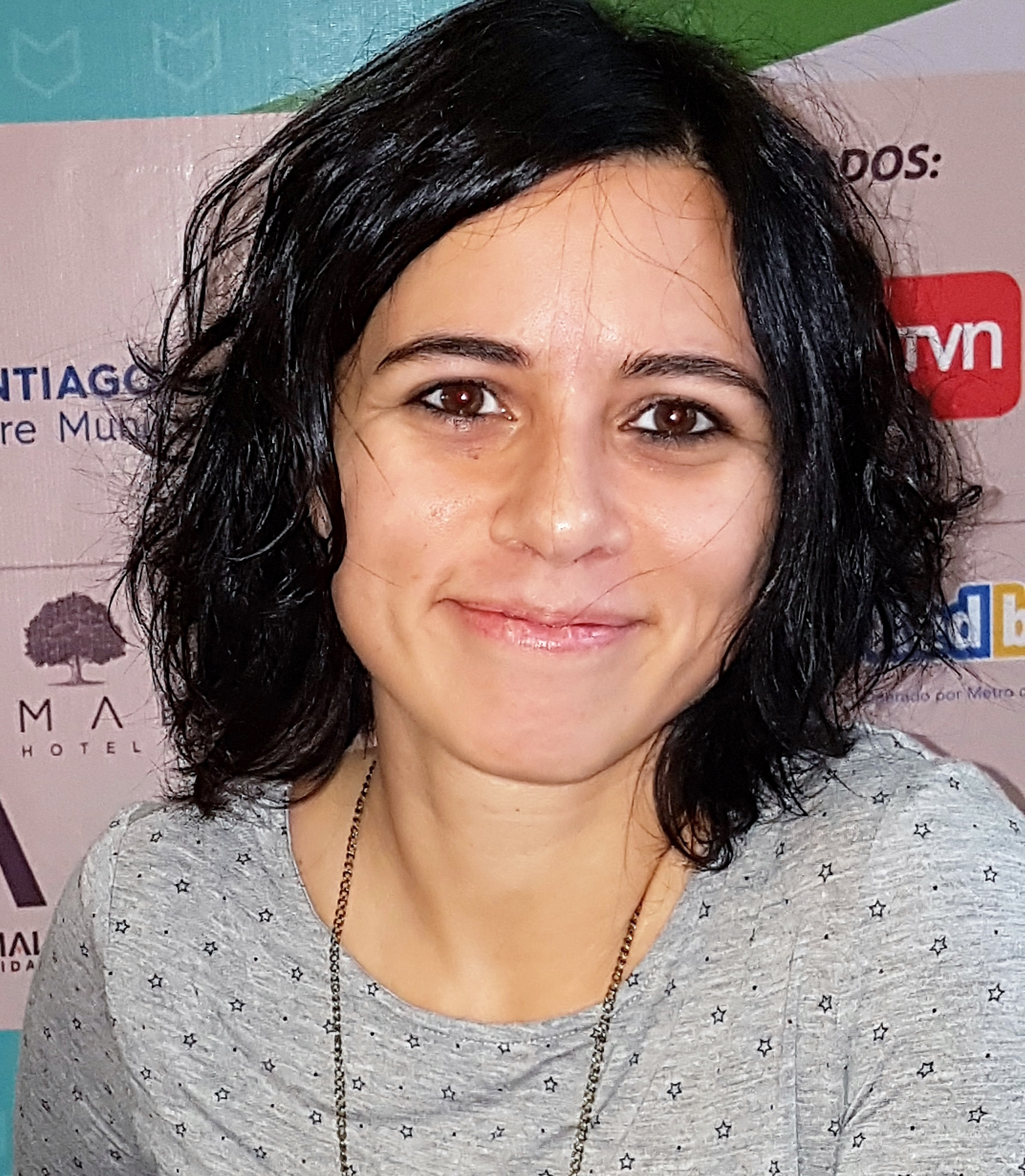
- Torres in 2017
- Born: 1981 (age 44–45)
- Occupation: Writer

Mariana Torres (born 1981) is a Brazilian writer and film director.

== Life ==
Torres was born in 1981. She studied creative writing in Madrid, film in Escuela de Cinematografía y del Audiovisual de la Comunidad de Madrid, and chemistry in Autonomous University of Madrid. Her first book, a short story collection titled El cuerpo secreto, was published in 2015, and her work has been anthologized in many publications.

She is a founder member of Escuela de Escritores, a creative writing institute. She is also a part of Connecting European Literary Artists, which was created to bring together young writers and translators in a variety of European languages and is run by the Dutch institution Wintertuin.

She directed the short film Rascacielos, which has been exhibited in 40 film festivals, winning prizes in the US, Italy, Australia, UK and Slovenia.

In 2017, she was named as one of the Bogota39, a selection of the best young writers in Latin America. The other 38 included Samanta Schweblin, Gabriela Jauregui from Mexico, Liliana Colanzi from Bolivia and the Argentinians María José Caro and Lola Copacabana.

She lives in Madrid.
