= Juan Pablo Roncone =

Chilean writer

Juan Pablo Roncone (born 1982) is a Chilean writer. He was born in Arica in northern Chile in 1982, and moved to Santiago in the early 2000s to study law. He is best known for his short story collection Hermano ciervo (Brother Deer). His work has been translated into English and anthologized. In 2017, he was named as one of the Bogotá39, a selection of the best young writers in Latin America.
