= Diego Erlan =

Diego Erlan (born 1979) is an Argentine writer. He was born in San Miguel de Tucumán. He studied journalism, art history, and social communication. He has worked variously as a professor, scriptwriter and cultural critic. He runs the literary pages of the Revista Ñ magazine. He was nominated for the Premio Gabriel García Márquez de Periodismo in 2013 for his piece titled "La larga risa de todos estos años". He has published three novels to date: El amor nos destrozará (2012), La disolución (2016) and Satélite de amor (2017). In 2017, he was chosen as one of the Bogota39, a list of the best young writers in Latin America.
