= Diego Zúñiga =

Chilean writer and journalist

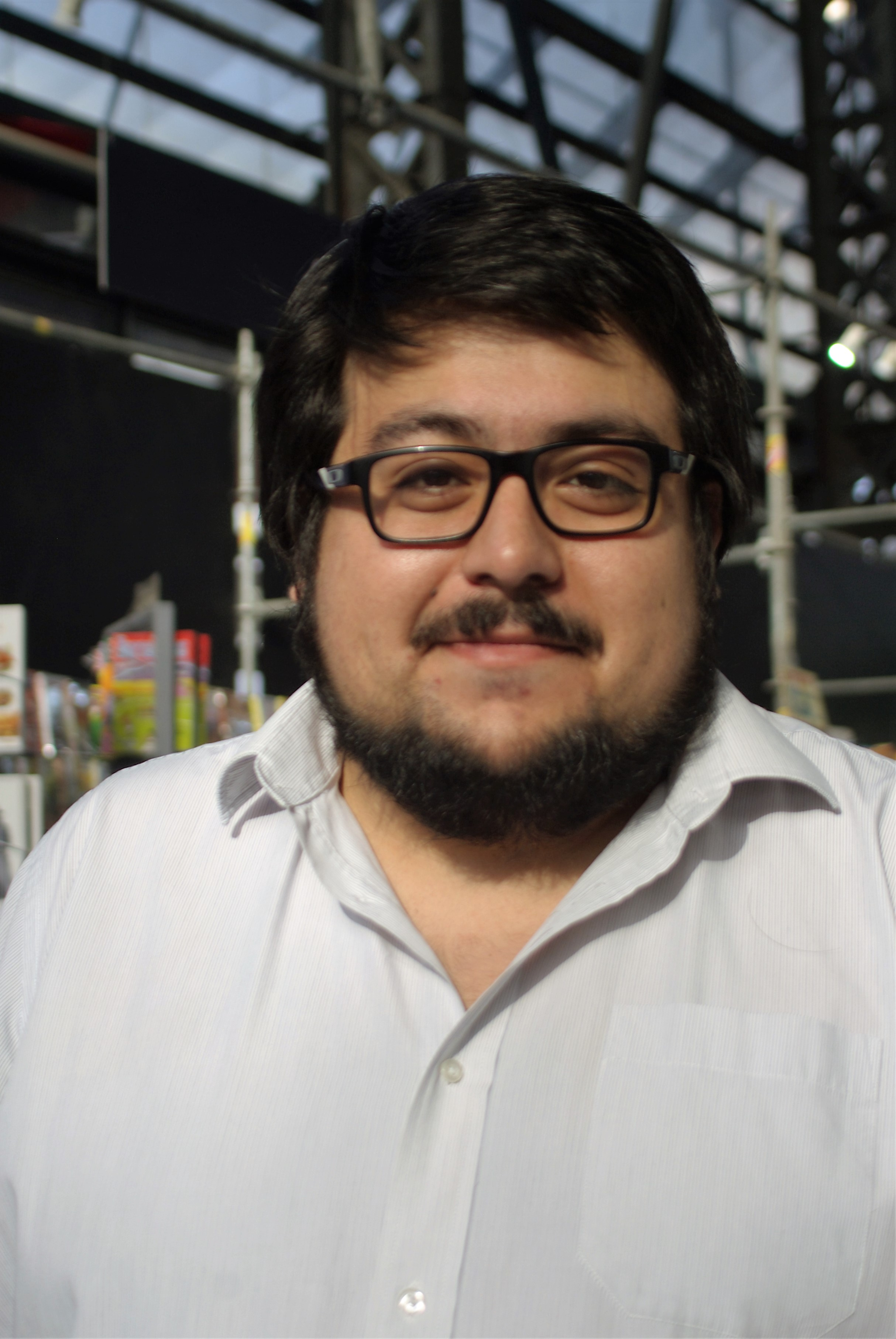
Diego Zuñiga (2016).

Diego Eduardo Zúñiga Henríquez (born 1987) is a Chilean writer and journalist. He was born in Iquique and spent his childhood there before moving to Santiago in his early teens. He studied journalism at the Pontifical Catholic University of Chile and co-founded the publishing house Montacerdos. He has published three books: Camanchaca (novel, 2012), Racimo (novel, 2014) and Niños héroes (short stories, 2016) and has won numerous domestic literary prizes. In 2017, he was included in the Bogotá39 list of the best young Latin American writers.
