= Álvaro Bisama =

Chilean writer

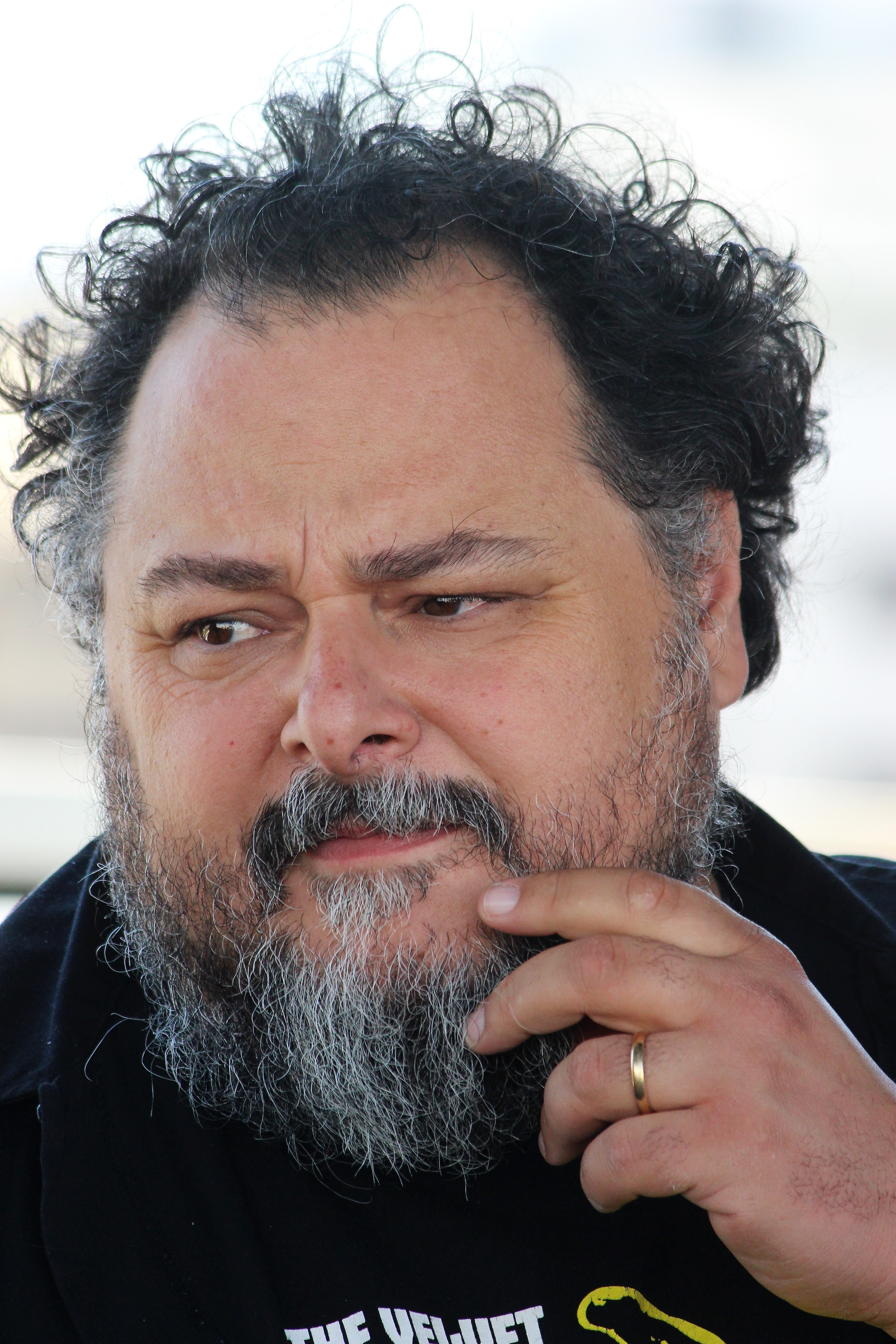
- Bisama in 2018
- Born: Álvaro Bisama Mayné; 18 April 1975 (age 51); Valparaíso, Chile
- Education: University of Chile
- Occupations: Writer, critic

Álvaro Bisama Mayné (born 18 April 1975) is a Chilean writer and literary critic. He was named as one of the best young writers in Latin America by the Hay Festival as part of Bogotá39.

He was born in Valparaíso, and studied at Playa Ancha University and the University of Chile. He teaches at Alberto Hurtado University.

Bisama has written a number of books including:

- Zona cero (Edición del Gobierno Regional de Valparaíso, 2003)
- Caja negra (novel, 2006)
- Postales urbanas (2006)
- Música marciana (novel, Planeta, Santiago, 2008)
- Cien libros chilenos (criticism, Ediciones B, Santiago, 2008)
- Estrellas muertas (novel, Alfaguara, 2010) (translated into English as Dead Stars by Megan McDowell for Ox and Pigeon Electronic Books, 2014)
- Ruido (Alfaguara, 2012)
- Oraculo (Seix Barral Chile, 2025)

His awards and citations include:

- One of the 100 Young Chilean Leaders, or 100 Líderes Jóvenes Chilenos, selected in 2005 by El Mercurio
- Selected by Bogotá39 in 2007 as one of the best young writers in Latin America
- 2011 Santiago Municipal Literature Award for Estrellas muertas
- Premio Academia 2011 (awarded by Academia Chilena de la Lengua) for the best book of 2010 (Estrellas muertas)
- Finalist for the 2013 Altazor Award for Ruido
