= Mauro Javier Cárdenas =

Ecuadorian author

- Education: Stanford University
- Occupation: Writer
- Writing career
- Years active: 2016–present
- Notable work: American Abductions (2023)

Mauro Javier Cárdenas is an Ecuadorian author based in the United States. His work often deals with diaspora or migrant populations from South America within the United States, and their relationship with their home country. He also often invokes themes of privacy, technology and social alienation. Colombia is a frequent setting of his works, alongside the United States.

== Education ==
Cárdenas grew up in Guayaquil, Ecuador before moving to the United States to attend Stanford University. He graduated with a degree in economics.

== Career ==
Cárdenas' debut novel, The Revolutionaries Try Again was released in 2016. Outlets such as Kirkus Reviews called it a strong debut with "nuance and authority". That year he received the Joseph Henry Jackson Award.

In 2017, he was named one of the Bogota39 by the Hay Festival, a selection of the best young writers within Latin America.

His second novel, Aphasia, was released in 2020 to rave reviews.

Cárdenas' third novel was published in 2024. American Abductions deals with data harvesting and alienation that occurs within a technologically observed society. This book also received strong reviews from outlets such as the New York Times and Kirkus Reviews.

== Bibliography ==
- The Revolutionaries Try Again (Coffee House Press, 2016)
- Aphasia (FSG, 2020)
- American Abductions (The Dalkey Archive, 2024)

== See also ==
- Latin American Literature
