= Mauro Libertella =

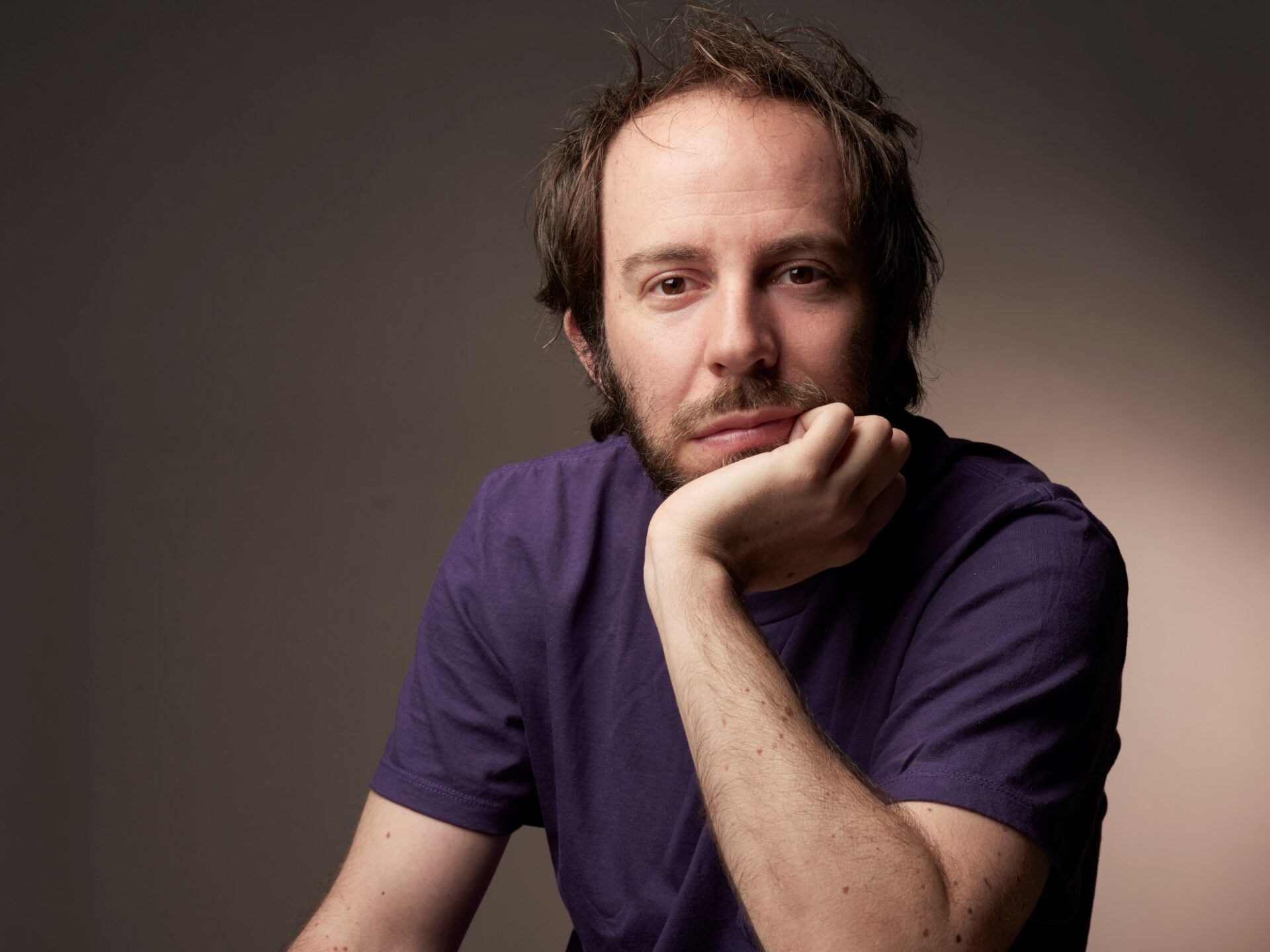
Mauro Libertella

Mauro Libertella (born 1983) is an Argentinian writer. He was born in Mexico City and grew up in Buenos Aires. He studied literature at university, before pursuing a career as a journalist and fiction writer. He has published five books to date. In 2017, he was named as one of the Bogota39, a list of the best young writers in Latin America.

== Books ==
- Un hombre entre paréntesis, NON FICTION, 2019
- Un reino demasiado breve, NOVEL, 2017
- El invierno con mi generación, NOVEL, 2015
- El estilo de otros, NON FICTION, 2015
- Mi libro enterrado, NOVEL, 2013
