= Rolex Mentor and Protégé Arts Initiative =

Philanthropic programme

The Rolex Mentor and Protégé Arts Initiative is an international arts programme established in 2002 by Rolex. It pairs emerging artists with established figures in fields such as architecture, dance, film, literature, music, theatre and the visual arts for year-long mentorships. The programme, which runs on a biennial cycle, is funded by the company's philanthropic division. The scheme is similar to the Rolex Awards for Enterprise, which supports scientists, conservationists and explorers.

Mentor and protégé are expected to work together for six weeks over a two-year period. Each protégé receives a grant of about $41,000 in addition to funds for travel and expenses.

== Participants ==
Not every discipline is covered in each cycle.

=== Architecture ===
(The architecture discipline was launched in 2012)

	Mentor	Protégé
2012–2013	Kazuyo Sejima (Japan)	Zhao Yang (China)
2014–2015	Peter Zumthor (Switzerland)	Gloria Cabral (Paraguay)
2016–2017	David Chipperfield (UK)	Simon Kretz (Switzerland)
2018–2019	David Adjaye (Ghana / United Kingdom)	Mariam Issoufou (Niger)
2023–2024	Anne Lacaton (France)	Arine Aprahamian (Lebanon / Armenia)

=== Dance ===
	Mentor	Protégé
2002–2003	William Forsythe (United States)	Sang Jijia (China)
2004–2005	Saburo Teshigawara (Japan)	Junaid Jemal Sendi (Ethiopia)
2006–2007	Anne Teresa De Keersmaeker (Belgium)	Anani Dodji Sanouvi (Togo)
2008–2009	Jiří Kylián (Czech Republic)	Jason Akira Somma (United States)
2010–2011	Trisha Brown (United States)	Lee Serle (Australia)
2012–2013	Lin Hwai-Min (Taiwan)	Eduardo Fukushima (Brazil)
2014–2015	Alexei Ratmansky (Russia/United States)	Myles Thatcher (United States)
2016–2017	Ohad Naharin (Israel)	Londiwe Khoza (South Africa)
2018–2019	Crystal Pite (Canada)	Khoudia Touré (Senegal)

=== Film ===
(The film discipline was launched in 2004)

	Mentor	Protégé
2004–2005	Mira Nair (India)	Aditya Assarat (Thailand)
2006–2007	Stephen Frears (United Kingdom)	Josué Méndez (Peru)
2008–2009	Martin Scorsese (United States)	Celina Murga (Argentina)
2010–2011	Zhang Yimou (China)	Annemarie Jacir (Palestine/Jordan)
2012–2013	Walter Murch (United States)	Sara Fgaier (Italy)
2014–2015	Alejandro G. Iñárritu (Mexico)	Tom Shoval (Israel)
2016–2017	Alfonso Cuarón (Mexico)	Chaitanya Tamhane (India)
2020–2022	Spike Lee (United States)	Kile Bell (United States)
2023–2024	Jia Zhangke (China)	Rafael Manuel (Philippines)
2025–2026	Boong Joon-ho (South Korea)	Rahul M (India)

=== Literature ===
	Mentor	Protégé
2002–2003	Toni Morrison (United States)	Julia Leigh (Australia)
2004–2005	Mario Vargas Llosa (Peru)	Antonio García Ángel (Colombia)
2006–2007	Tahar Ben Jelloun (Morocco)	Edem Awumey (Togo)
2008–2009	Wole Soyinka (Nigeria)	Tara June Winch (Australia)
2010–2011	Hans Magnus Enzensberger (Germany)	Tracy K. Smith (United States)
2012–2013	Margaret Atwood (Canada)	Naomi Alderman (United Kingdom)
2014–2015	Michael Ondaatje (Canada)	Miroslav Penkov (Bulgaria)
2016–2017	Mia Couto (Mozambique)	Julián Fuks (Brazil / Argentina)
2018–2019	Colm Tóibín (Ireland)	Colin Barrett (Ireland / Canada)
2023–2024	Bernardine Evaristo (Great Britain)	Ayesha Harruna Attah (Ghana / Senegal)

=== Music ===
	Mentor	Protégé
2002–2003	Colin Davis (United Kingdom)	Josep Caballé-Domenech (Spain)
2004–2005	Jessye Norman (United States)	Susan Platts (Canada)
2006–2007	Pinchas Zukerman (Israel)	David Aaron Carpenter (United States)
2008–2009	Youssou N’Dour (Senegal)	Aurelio Martínez (Honduras)
2010–2011	Brian Eno (United Kingdom)	Ben Frost (Australia)
2012–2013	Gilberto Gil (Brazil)	Dina El Wedidi (Egypt)
2014–2015	Kaija Saariaho (Finland)	Vasco Mendonça (Portugal)
2016–2017	Philip Glass (United States)	Pauchi Sasaki (Peru)
2018–2019	Zakir Hussain (India)	Marcus Gilmore (United States)
2023–2024	Dianne Reeves (United States)	Song Yi Jeon (South Korea)

=== Theatre ===
	Mentor	Protégé
2002–2003	Robert Wilson (United States)	Federico León (Argentina)
2004–2005	Peter Hall (United Kingdom)	Lara Foot (South Africa)
2006–2007	Julie Taymor (United States)	Selina Cartmell (United Kingdom)
2008–2009	Kate Valk (United States)	Nahuel Pérez Biscayart (Argentina)
2010–2011	Peter Sellars (United States)	Maya Zbib (Lebanon)
2012–2013	The late Patrice Chéreau (France)	Michał Borczuch (Poland)
2014–2015	Jennifer Tipton (United States)	Sebastián Solórzano Rodríguez (Mexico)
2016–2017	Robert Lepage (Canada)	Matías Umpierrez (Argentina / Spain)
2020–2022	Phyllida Lloyd (Great Britain)	Whitney White (United States)

=== Visual arts ===
	Mentor	Protégé
2002–2003	Álvaro Siza (Portugal)	Sahel Al Hiyari (Jordan)
2004–2005	David Hockney (United Kingdom)	Matthias Weischer (Germany)
2006–2007	John Baldessari (United States)	Alejandro Cesarco (Uruguay)
2008–2009	Rebecca Horn (Germany)	Masanori Handa (Japan)
2010–2011	Anish Kapoor (United Kingdom)	Nicholas Hlobo (South Africa)
2012–2013	William Kentridge (South Africa)	Mateo López (Colombia)
2014–2015	Olafur Eliasson (Denmark/Iceland)	Sammy Baloji (Democratic Republic of the Congo)
2016–2017	Joan Jonas (United States)	Thao-Nguyen Phan (Vietnam)
2020–2022	Carrie Mae Weems (United States)	Camila Rodríguez Triana (Columbia)
2023–2024	El Anatsui (Ghana)	Bronwyn Katz (South Africa)

=== Open category ===
	Mentor	Protégé
2020–2022	Lin-Manuel Miranda (United States)	Agustina San Martín (Argentina)
