= Juan Cárdenas (writer) =

Juan Sebastián Cárdenas (born 1978) is a Colombian writer and translator. He was born in Popayán in the southwestern province of Cauca. He studied philosophy at the Javeriana University of Bogotá before moving to Madrid in 1998, where he continued his studies at Complutense University and worked for several publishing houses. He has published seven works of fiction and has translated works by American writers such as William Faulkner, Thomas Wolfe and Gordon Lish, Portuguese author Eça de Queirós and Brazilian author Machado de Assis.

In 2017, he was named as one of the Bogota39, a selection of the best young writers in Latin America.

In September 2023 the English translation of El diablo de las provincias (The Devil of the Provinces) was longlisted for the National Book Award for Translated Literature.

== Bibliography ==
=== Novels ===
- Zumbido (2010)
- Los estratos (2013) (VI Premio Otras Voces, Otros Ámbitos)
- Ornamento (2015); Ornamental trans. Lizzie Davis (Coffee House Press, Minneapolis, 2020)
- Tú y yo, una novelita rusa (2015)
- El diablo de las provincias (2017) (Premio de Narrativa José María Arguedas, 2019); The Devil of the Provinces, trans. Lizzie Davis (Coffee House Press, Minneapolis, 2023)
- Elástico de sombra (2019)
- Peregrino transparente (2023)
