= Santiago Nazarian =

Brazilian writer

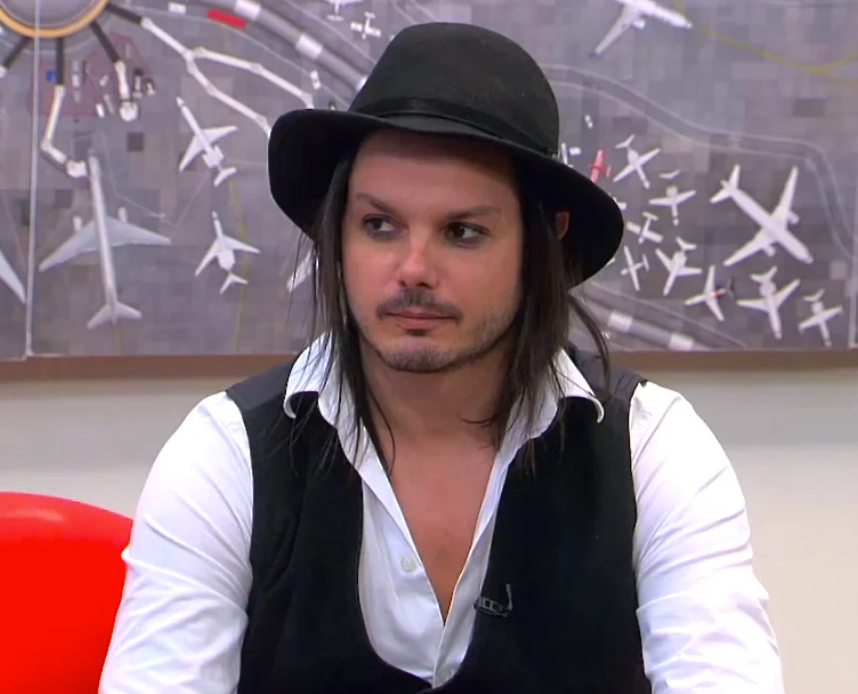
Santiago Nazarian

Santiago Nazarian (São Paulo, 1977) is a Brazilian writer. He studied literature and graduated in Social Communications in São Paulo, Brazil. In 2007, he was selected by the Hay Festival as one of the 39 highest profile Latin American writers under the age of 39.

His literary project is labeled as "bizarre existentialism", mixing classic literary references with horror, pop and trash culture.

== Books published ==
- Olívio (Talento, Brazil 2003, Prêmio Fundação Conrado Wessel de Literatura)
- A Morte Sem Nome (Planeta, Brazil 2004; Palavra, Portugal 2005)
- Feriado de Mim Mesmo (Planeta, Brazil, 2005)
- Mastigando Humanos (Nova Fronteira, Brazil, 2006; Editora Record, Brazil; Ediciones Ambulantes, Spain; La Linea, Italy, 2013 )
- O Prédio, o Tédio e o Menino Cego (Record, Brazil 2009)
- Pornofantasma (Record, Brazil 2011)
- Garotos Malditos (Record, Brazil 2012)
- Biofobia (Record, Brazil 2014)

== See also ==
- Bogotá39
