= Private University of Santa Cruz de la Sierra =

Coordinates: 17.7625°S 63.1479°W

Private University of Santa Cruz de la Sierra (Universidad Privada de Santa Cruz de la Sierra) is a private University in Bolivia.

Alumni include Brenda Boral, Luis Fernando Camacho and Liliana Colanzi.

Faculty includes Raquel Couzet.

The school hosts the UPSA Cup.
