= Antonio García Angel =

Colombian writer

- Education: Javeriana University
- Occupation: Writer
- Writing career
- Notable awards: One of the Bogotá39

Antonio García Ángel is a Colombian writer. He studied at the Javeriana University in Bogotá. He published his first novel in 2001, and has since published a dozen books. In 2004, he studied for a year with the Nobel-winning novelist Mario Vargas Llosa under the Rolex Mentor and Protégé Arts Initiative. In 2007, he was named as one of the Bogotá39, a selection of the best young writers in Latin America.
