= Ricardo Silva Romero =

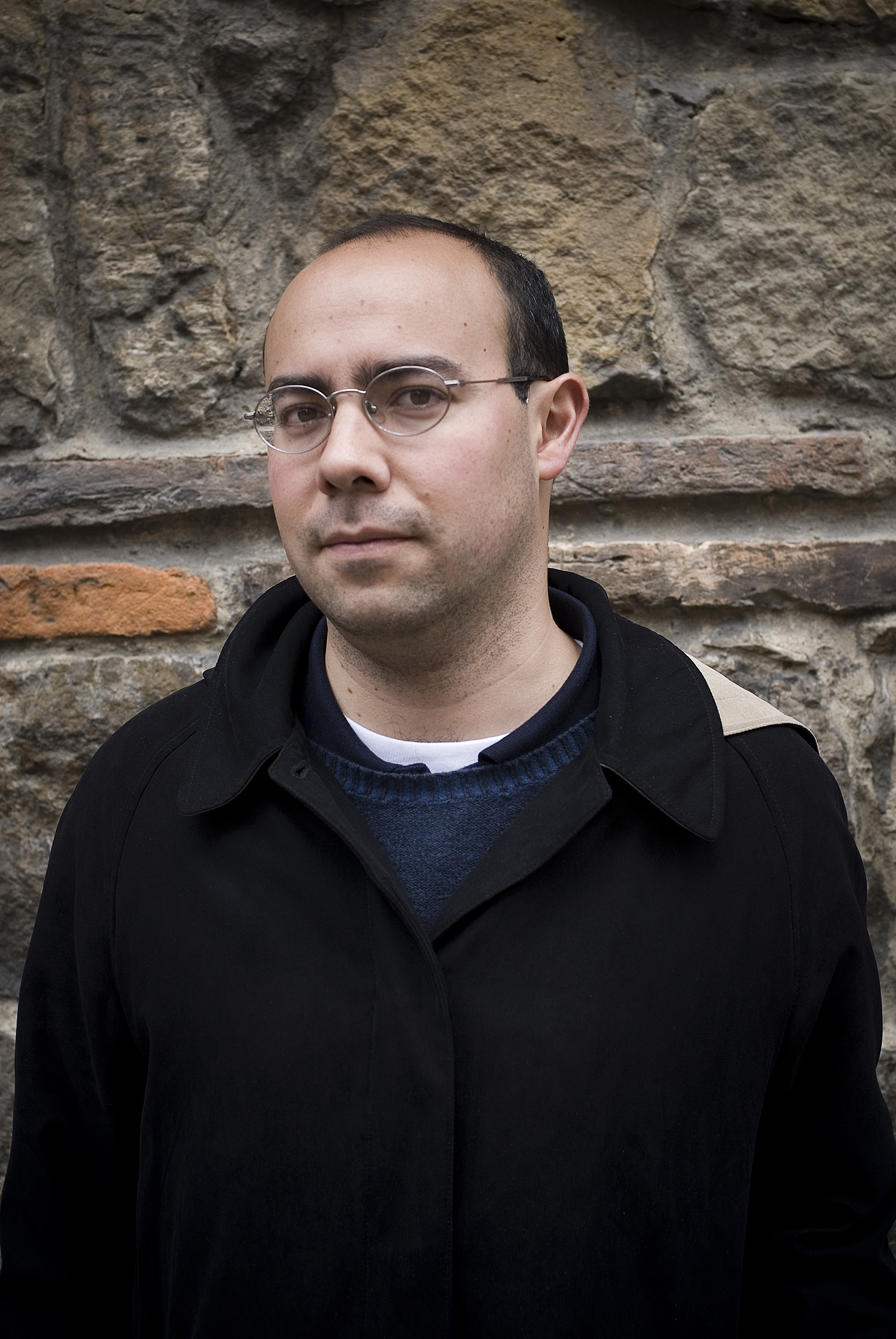
Ricardo Silva Romero

Ricardo Silva Romero (born 1975) is a Colombian writer, journalist, screenwriter and film critic. He is the author of over a dozen books in a variety of genres. In 2007, he was named as one of the Bogota39, a list of best young writers in Latin America.

== Work ==
- Sobre la tela de una araña (1999)
- Relato de Navidad en La Gran Vía (2001)
- Walkman (2002)
- Tic (2003)
- Terranía (2004)
- Parece que va a llover (2005)
- Fin (2005)
- El hombre de los mil nombres (2006)
- Autogol (2009)
- Semejante a la vida (2011)
- Que no me miren (2011)
- Comedia romántica (2012)
- El Espantapájaros (2012)
- El libro de los ojos (2013)
- El libro de la envidia (2014)
- Historia oficial del amor (2016)
- Ficcionario (2017).
- Cómo perderlo todo (2018).
- Historia de la locura en Colombia (2019).
- Río Muerto (2020).
- Zoológico humano (2021).
- Cómo vivir en vano (2022).
- El libro del duelo (2023).
- Crucigrama (2023).
- Alpe d'Huez (2024).
- Mural (2025).
