= Leonardo Valencia (writer) =

Ecuadorian writer

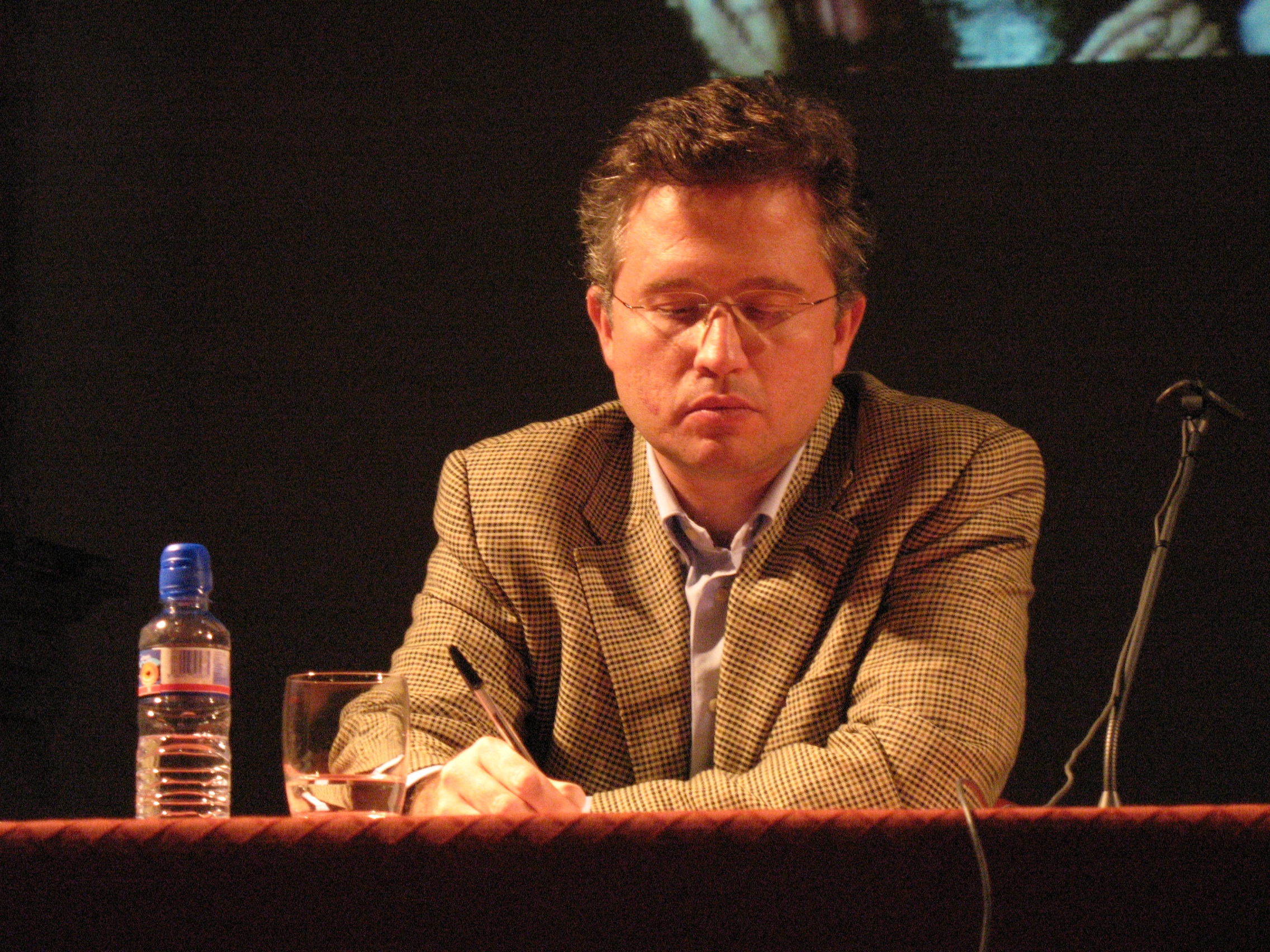
Image of Leonardo Valencia

Leonardo Valencia (born 1969) is an Ecuadorian writer. He was born in Guayaquil, and studied in Ecuador and Spain, where he obtained a PhD in literary theory at the Universidad Autónoma de Barcelona. He also created the university's creative writing program and ran it for several years.

In 1995, he published the short story collection La luna nómada (1995). Since then he has published novels such as El desterrado (2000) and El libro flotante de Caytran Dölphin (2006); the latter was also accompanied by a parallel narrative on the internet (www.libroflotante.net), created in collaboration with the digital artist Eugenio Tisselli. He also worked with Wilfrido Corral to publish the anthology Cuentistas hispanoamericanos de entresiglo (McGraw Hill, 2005). In 2008, he published a collection of essays El síndrome de Falcón. His latest novel is called Kazbek.

He was named as one of the Bogota39 group of writers in 2007.

In 2024, he was accused by the writer and academic Cristina Burneo of workplace harassment, restrictions to academic liberty and gender violence, which according to her happened while both worked at the Universidad Andina Simón Bolívar. Burneo also declared that Valencia had publicly shown anti-gender positions.

== Bibliography ==
- La luna nómada (1995)
- El desterrado (2000)
- El libro flotante de Caytran Dölphin (2006)
- El síndrome de Falcón (2008)
- Kazbek (2009)
- Moneda al aire (2018)
- La escalera de Bramante (2019)
