= Álvaro Enrigue =

Mexican author (born 1969)

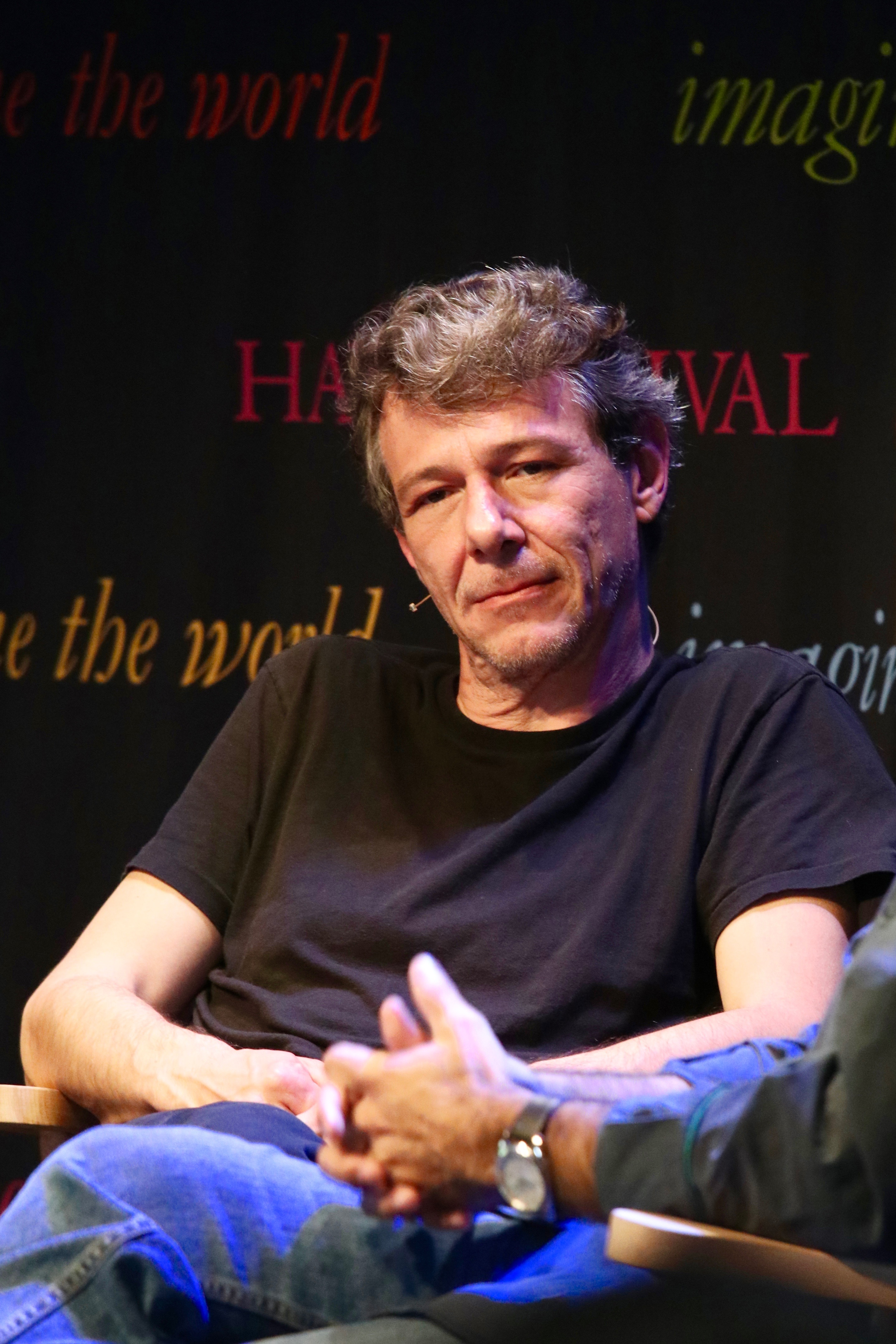
- Enrigue at the 2016 Hay Festival
- Born: Álvaro Enrigue Soler; August 6, 1969 (age 57); Guadalajara, Mexico

Álvaro Enrigue (born 6 August 1969) is a Mexican novelist, short-story writer, essayist, and academic. He is the author of six novels, three books of short stories, and one book of essays.

== Early life ==
The son of a Jalisco lawyer and a chemist and refugee from Barcelona, he is the youngest of four brothers. Shortly after his birth, the family moved to Mexico City because of his father's law work.

He studied for a degree in journalism at the Universidad Iberoamericana, where he was later a literature professor. As a young man he began his career as editor and columnist in various cultural magazines, including Vuelta, founded and directed by Octavio Paz, and Letras Libres. Later he was editor at the Fondo de Cultura Económica (FCE) and at the Secretariat of Culture (then known as CONACULTA).

== Career ==
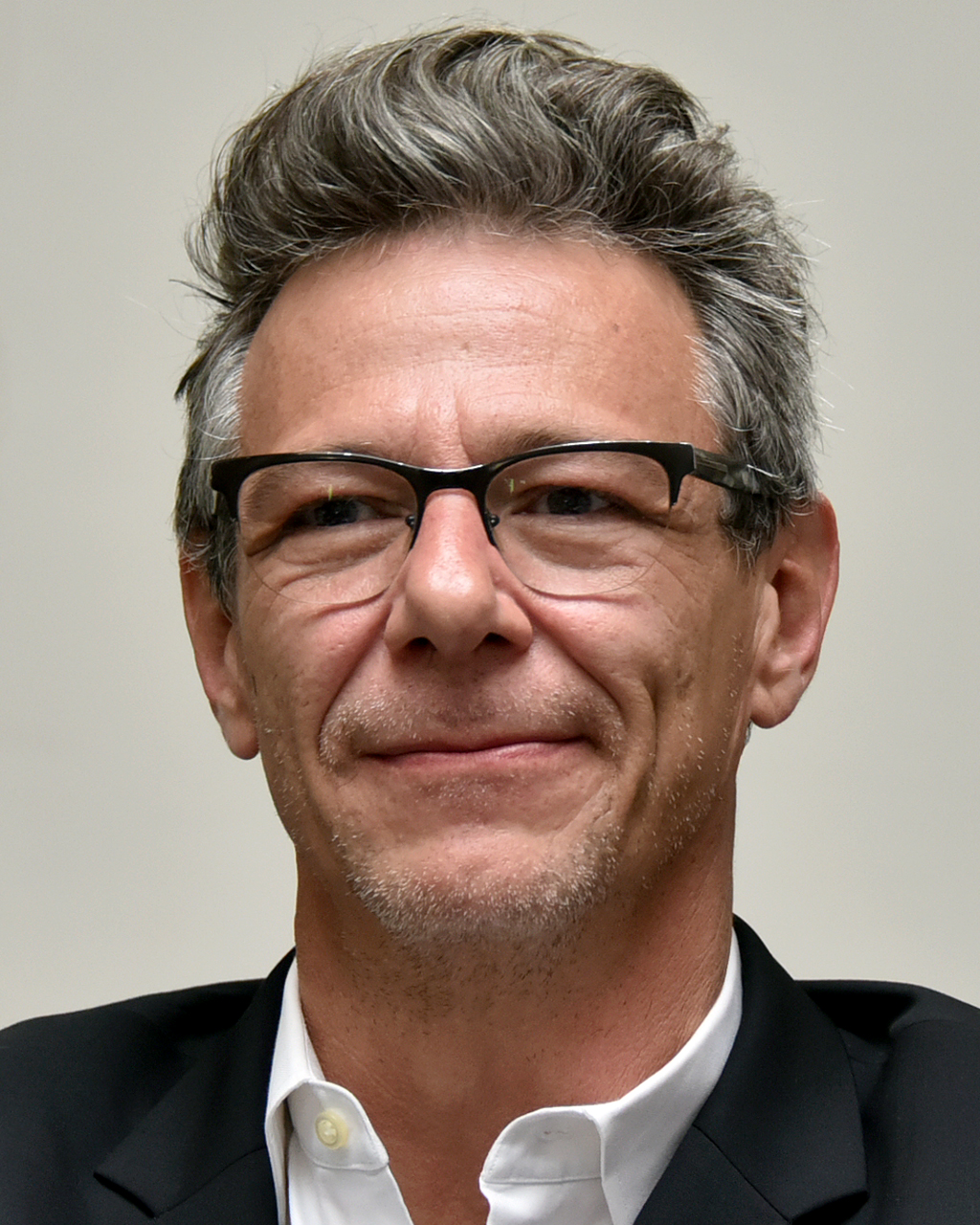
Álvaro Enrigue, 2019

In 1996, at the age of 27, Enrigue was awarded the prestigious Joaquín Mortiz Prize for his first novel, La muerte de un instalador (Death of an Installation Artist). Since then it has been reprinted five times, and in 2012 it was selected as one of the key novels of the Mexican 20th century, and anthologized by Mexico's largest publishing house, Fondo de Cultura Económica. His books Vidas perpendiculares (Perpendicular Lives) and Hipotermia (Hypothermia) have also been widely acclaimed.

Álvaro Enrigue's excellent novel Vidas perpendiculares belongs to many literary traditions at once and shows a great mastery of them all ... His novel belongs to Max Planck's quantum universe rather than the relativistic universe of Albert Einstein: a world of coexisting fields in constant interaction and whose particles are created or destroyed in the same act.

— Carlos Fuentes, El País

Both novels have been published by Gallimard. Hypothermia, which offers an "unflinching gaze towards 21st-century life and the immigrant experience", was published in 2013 in the United States and England by Dalkey Archive Press in a translation by Brendan Riley. His 2011 novel, Decencia (Decency), received praise in Latin America's and Spain's most relevant publications.

In 2007, he was selected as one of the most influential contemporary writers in Spanish by the Hay Festival's Bogotá39. In 2009, he was awarded a Rockefeller Foundation Residence Fellowship at the Bellagio Centre to finish the manuscript of his novel, Decencia (Decency). In 2011 he became a fellow at the Cullman Center for Writers and Scholars of the New York Public Library, where he began working on his fifth novel.

On November 4, 2013, Enrigue's novel Muerte súbita (Sudden Death) was announced as the winner of the 31st Herralde Novel Prize, joining a distinguished list of works by authors from Spain and Latin America, including Sergio Pitol, Enrique Vila-Matas, Álvaro Pombo, Javier Marías, Juan Villoro, and Roberto Bolaño.

Along with his work as a writer, he is a Professor of Romance Languages and Literatures at Hofstra University, having earned a Ph.D. in Latin American Literature at the University of Maryland, College Park.

His work has been translated into multiple languages, including English, German, French, Czech, and Chinese.

== Personal life ==
Enrigue resides in the Hamilton Heights neighborhood in New York City.

== Selected publications ==
=== Books ===
- La muerte de un instalador, Mexico City: Joaquín Mortiz (1996); La muerte de un instalador. Penguin Random House Grupo Editorial México. 1 November 2012. ISBN 978-607-31-1356-4.
- Virtudes capitales, Mexico City: Editorial Joaquín Mortiz, 1998, ISBN 9789682707285
- El cementerio de sillas, Madrid/Mexico City: Ediciones Lengua de Trapo, 2002, ISBN 9788489618985
- Hipotermia, Barcelona/Mexico City: Anagrama (2006); English translation: Hypothermia. Dalkey Archive Press. 2 May 2013. pp. 133–. ISBN 978-1-56478-969-3.
- Vidas perpendiculares, Barcelona/Mexico City: Editorial Anagrama, 2008, ISBN 9789688673645
- Decencia, Barcelona/Mexico City: Editorial Anagrama, 2011, ISBN 9788433932921
- El amigo del héroe. Penguin Random House Grupo Editorial México. 1 November 2012. ISBN 978-607-31-1402-8.
- Muerte súbita, Barcelona/Mexico City: Editorial Anagrama, 2013, ISBN 9788433934505; English translation: Sudden Death, Riverhead, 2016, ISBN 9781594633461
- Un samurái ve el amanecer en Acapulco, Mexico City: La Caja de Cerillos Ediciones, December 2013, ISBN 9786078205097
- Ahora me rindo y eso es todo, Barcelona/Mexico City: Editorial Anagrama, 2018, ISBN 9788433939838; English translation: Now I Surrender, Riverhead, 2026, ISBN 9780593084076, translated by Natasha Wimmer
- Tu sueño imperios han sido, Barcelona/Mexico City: Editorial Anagrama, 2022, ISBN 9788433999498; English translation: You Dreamed of Empires, Riverhead, 2024, ISBN 9780593544792, translated by Natasha Wimmer

=== Articles ===
- Álvaro Enrigue, "The Discovery of Europe" (review of Caroline Dodds Pennock, On Savage Shores: How Indigenous Americans Discovered Europe, Knopf, 2023, 302 pp.), The New York Review of Books, vol. LXXI, no. 1 (18 January 2024), pp. 34–35, 39. Caroline Dodds Pennock writes: "We need to invert our understanding of encounter to see transatlantic migration and connection not just as stretching to the west, but also as originating there." (p. 34.) According to the reviewer, "Until now the experiences of indigenous Americans in Europe had not been put together in one place.... On Savage Shores... sets the methodological standard for a new way of understanding the origin of the modern world." (p. 39.)
- Álvaro Enrigue,"Moviescapes", The Evergreen Review, Spring 2017.
