= Juan Esteban Constaín =

Colombian writer

- Born: 1979 (age 46–47); Popayán
- Occupation: Writer
- Writing career
- Notable work: Los Mártires
- Notable awards: Espartaco prize
- Literary movement: Bogotá39

Juan Esteban Constaín is a Colombian writer. He was born in 1979 in Popayán. He published his first book in 2004, a short story collection titled Los Mártires. His first novel followed three years later, titled El naufragio del Imperio. His second novel ¡Calcio!, dealing with the probable origins of football, won the Espartaco prize. His 2014 book El hombre que no fue Jueves (The Man Who Wasn't Thursday) was a homage to G.K. Chesterton's classic novel The Man Who Was Thursday. It became a domestic bestseller and won the Biblioteca de Narrativa Colombiana prize. He has also published a book on Gabriel García Márquez titled Gabo contesta (2015).

Constain lives and works in Bogotá, where he teaches international relations at the Universidad del Rosario. He is also a translator and newspaper columnist. In 2017, he was named as one of the Bogotá39, a selection of the best young writers in Latin America.
