= Jesús Miguel Soto =

Venezuelan writer

Jesús Miguel Soto is a Venezuelan writer. He was born in El Valle, Caracas in 1981. He studied at the Universidad Central de Venezuela. Since 2014, he has lived in Mexico City where he works as a teacher and editor. He is known for his short story collection Perdidos en Frog (2013) and the novels La máscara de cuero and El caso Boeuf. He has won a number of literary prizes at home and abroad, and in 2017, he was selected as one of the Bogota39, a list of the best young writers in Latin America.
