= Damián González Bertolino =

Uruguayan writer (1980-)

Damián González Bertolino (born 1980) is a Uruguayan writer.

He was born and raised in the barrio of Kennedy in Punta del Este. Since 2002, he has taught literature at a high school. He won the 2009 Gran Premio del XVI Premio Nacional de Narrativa '"Narradores de la Banda Oriental" for his book El increíble Springer. He has also published collections of short stories - Los alienados (2009), Standard (2012) - and a selection of personal reflections titled A quién le cantan las sirenas (2013).

In 2017, he was named as one of the Bogota39, a list of the most promising young writers in Latin America.
