= Ronaldo Menéndez =

Cuban writer (born 1970)

Ronaldo Menéndez is a Cuban writer. He was born in Havana in 1970. He studied art history at university. He is the author of several works of fiction and non-fiction, among them the novel La casa y la isla and the travelogue Rojo aceituna.

He is the founder of Billar de Letras, a writing school in Madrid. Prior to his move to Madrid in 2004, he lived and worked in Lima, where he taught journalism and wrote for the Peruvian periodical El Comercio. In 2007, he was chosen as one of the Bogota39, a selection of the best young writers in Latin America.
