= Brenda Lozano =

Mexican writer

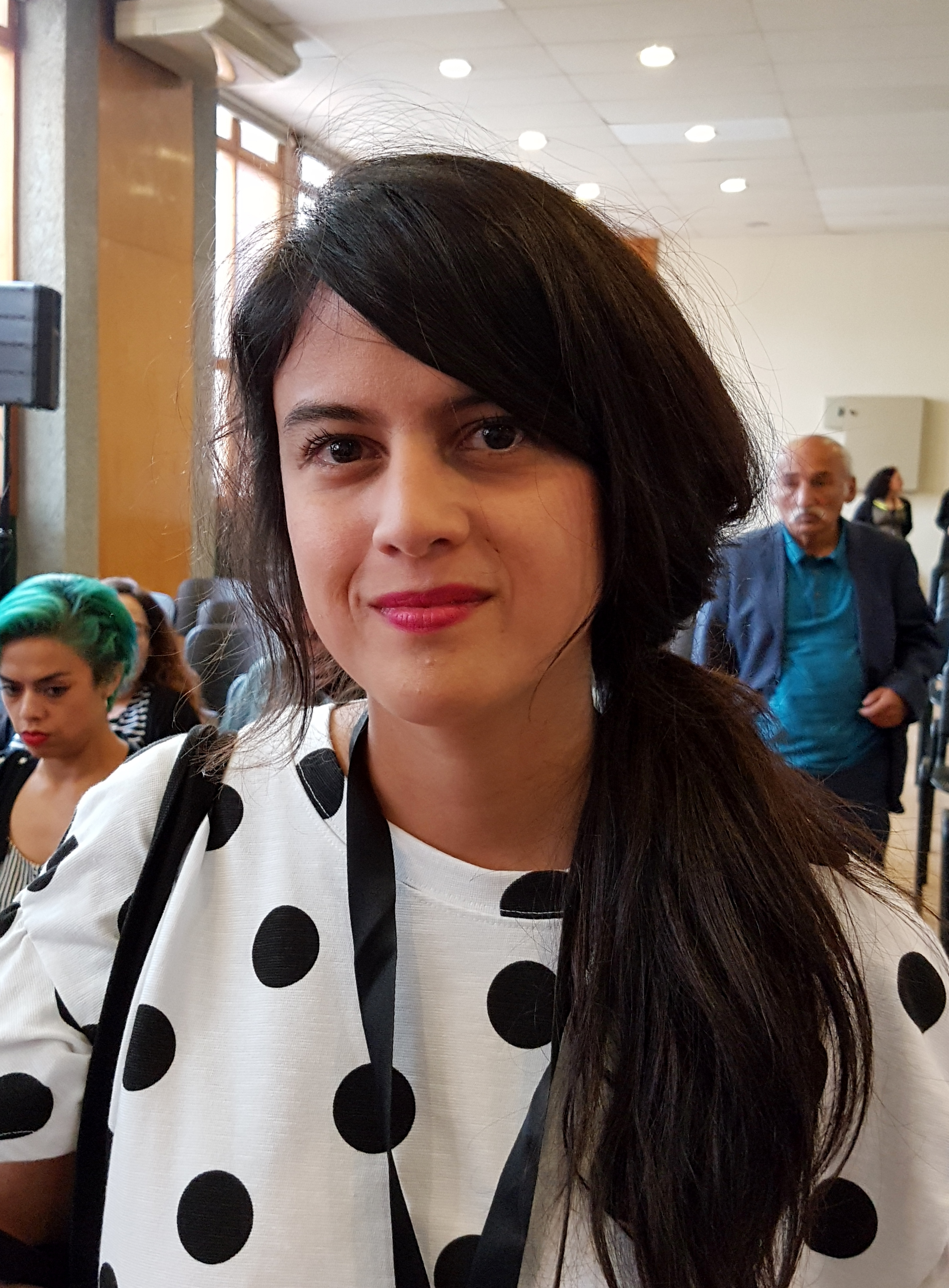
- Brenda Lozano at FILSA 2017
- Born: Brenda Lozano Vázquez; 12 June 1981; Mexico City
- Education: Ibero-American University
- Writing career
- Language: Spanish
- Genres: Novels, short stories

Brenda Lozano Vázquez (born 1981) is a Mexican writer best known for her novel Cuaderno ideal (translated as Loop) which received an English PEN Translates Grant.

== Career ==
Born in Mexico City, Lozano studied literature at the Universidad Iberoamericana. She has published three novels, Todo nada, Cuaderno ideal, and Brujas, as well as a book of short fiction Cómo piensan las piedras. In 2017, she was named as one of the Bogota 39, a selection of the best young writers in Latin America.

Cuaderno ideal, literally "Ideal Notebook", was translated into English by Annie McDermott under the title Loop. In 2019 Loop received an English PEN Translates Grant.

On 16 August 2021, Brenda Lozano was posted to the Mexican embassy in Spain as a cultural attaché. Only four days later, however, President Andrés Manuel López Obrador complained Lozano had previously been critical of his policies and rescinded the appointment. Lozano became the target of a coordinated astroturfing attack, harassing her via social media.

In 2022, Brujas was translated into English by Lozano's friend Heather Cleary for MacLehose Press (UK) and Catapult Books (US). It was named a TIME Best Book of the Month and critically acclaimed by The New York Times. Cleary is currently at work on her translation of Lozano's Mothers for Catapult Books (US).

== List of works ==
- Todo nada (2009)
- Cuaderno ideal (tr. Loop) (2014)
- Cómo piensan las piedras (2017)
- Brujas (tr. Witches) (2020)
- Soñar como sueñan los árboles (tr. Mothers) (2024)

== Awards ==
- English PEN Translates Grant (2019)
