= Slavko Župčić =

Venezuelan psychiatrist and writer (born 1970)

Slavko Župčić (born 1970) is a Venezuelan psychiatrist and writer.

== Life ==
He was born in the northern city of Valencia, the son of a Croatian father who had migrated to Venezuela in the 1950s. Župčić has a PhD from the Universidad Autónoma de Barcelona. He has published several novels and short story collections. He has also written books for children. His work has appeared in English translation.

In 2007, Zupcic was named as one of the best young writers in Latin America as part of the Bogotá39.

== See also ==
- Bogotá39
