= Eduardo Plaza =

Chilean writer (born 1982)

Eduardo Plaza (born 1982) is a Chilean writer. He was born in La Serena in the province of Coquimbo and studied journalism at the University of La Serena. His first collection of short stories titled Hienas was published in 2016. The following year, he was named as one of the Bogota39, a selection of the best young writers in Latin America.
