= Gonzalo Eltesch =

Chilean writer

Gonzalo Eltesch (born 1981) is a Chilean writer. He was born in Valparaíso and studied literature at university. He also obtained a diploma in publishing from Diego Portales University. Since 2008, he has worked at Penguin Random House Chile. His debut novel Colección particular received wide acclaim. In 2017, he was named as one of the Bogota39, a list of the most promising young writers in Latin America.

Eltesch lives in Barcelona.
