= Valentín Trujillo (writer) =

Uruguayan writer

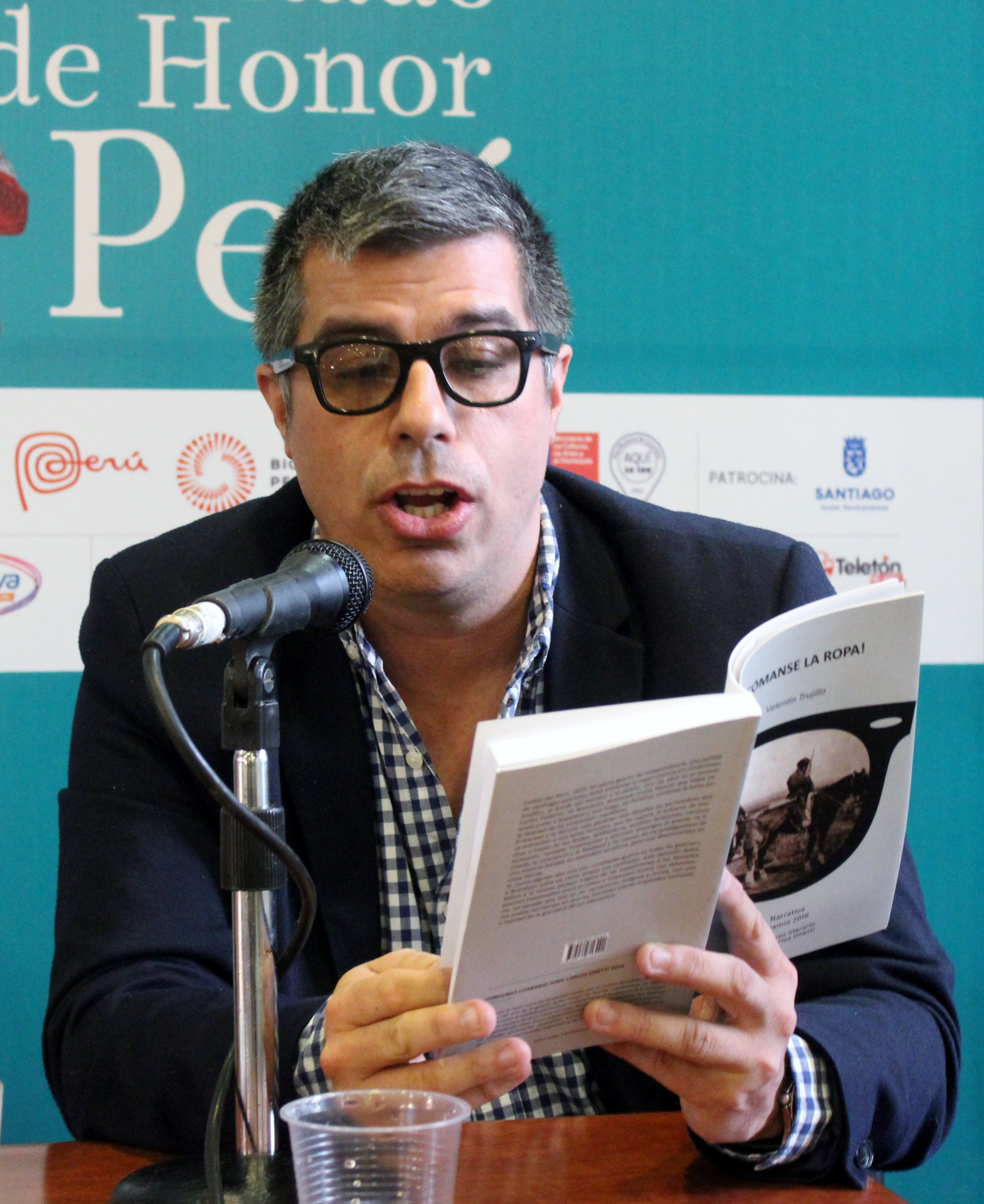
Trujillo, Valentin -FILSA 20181102 fRF01

Valentín Trujillo is an Uruguayan writer. He was born in Maldonado in 1979. He studied cinema at the Cinemateca Uruguaya and journalism at the Universidad Católica. In 2005, he started working as a journalist for El Observador newspaper in Montevideo. In 2007, he won the Premio Nacional de Narrativa Juan José Morosoli for his book of short stories Jaula de costillas. He contributed a story in an anthology titled Sobrenatural, published in 2012 by Estuario Editora. His second book of stories is titled Entre los jíbaros. He has also published a biography of the Uruguayan scholar Carlos Real de Azúa.

In 2017, Trujillo was named as one of the Bogota39, a list of the promising young writers in Latin America.

== Works ==
- 2007, Jaula de costillas
- 2013, Entre jíbaros
- 2017, Real de Azúa. Una biografía intelectual
- 2017, ¡Cómanse la ropa!
