= Caroline Dodds Pennock =

Historian

Caroline Dodds Pennock is a Historian. She is Professor in International History in the School of History, Philosophy and Digital Humanities at the University of Sheffield. She is an expert on the Aztecs, early modern history, women and gender, and the history of Indigenous Americans.

== Education ==
Dodds Pennock received a D.Phil. from the University of Oxford in 2004. Her thesis was entitled Warriors and Workers: Duality and Complementarity in Aztec Gender Roles and Relations.

== Career ==
Dodds Pennock was Lecturer and then Research Fellow at the University of Cambridge, and then Lecturer in Early Modern History at Leicester University, before moving to Sheffield.

Her book Bonds of Blood won the Royal Historical Society's Gladstone Prize in 2008. Her book On Savage Shores: How America Discovered the World was published in 2023. It was the New Statesman Best Book of the Year 2023, the Waterstones Book of the Year 2023, the Economist Book of the Year and one of the Smithsonian Magazine‘s Ten Best History Books of 2023. It was also a BBC History Magazine Book of the Year 2023, and one of History Workshop’s ‘Radical Reads’ for 2023. It was serialised as the Book of the Week on BBC Radio 4.

For her "exceptional contributions to revealing histories of early contact between civilisations and expanding our understanding of civilisation", Dodds Pennock was awarded the 2023 Humanists UK Voltaire Medal.

Dodds Pennock has contributed to the BBC, Netflix, and the Science Channel, and has written for BBC History Magazine, History Today, and Scientific American. She was a guest historian on the BBC's You're Dead To Me on the Aztecs.
