= Frank Báez =

Dominican poet

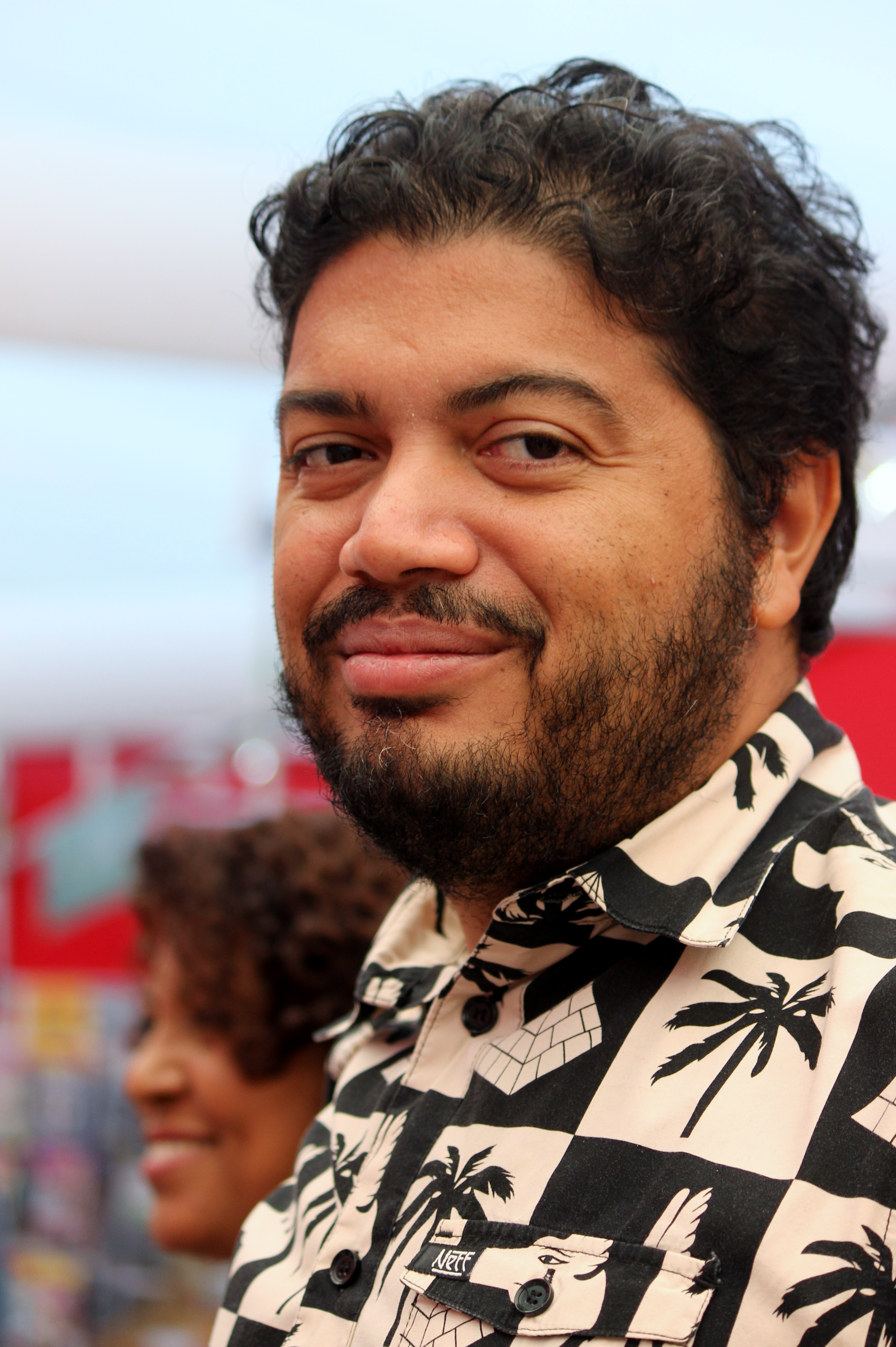
- Born: 1979 (age 46–47); Santo Domingo, Dominican Republic
- Occupation: Poet
- Writing career
- Notable awards: National Poetry Prize Salomé in 2009; Santo Domingo Book Fair First Prize in 2006

Frank Báez is a Dominican poet, editor, and writer, born in 1978 in Santo Domingo, Dominican Republic. He has published six poetry books, a short story collection, and four nonfiction books. Two of his books, Last night I dreamt I was a DJ (2014) and The end of the world came to my neighborhood (2022) have been translated into English.

Frank's collection of stories Págales tú a los psicoanalistas won the 2006 Santo Domingo Book Fair First Prize for short stories. His poetry collection Postales also won the National Poetry Prize Salomé Ureña in 2009.

Frank Báez studied psychology at the Santo Domingo Institute of Technology (Intec).

With fellow poet Homero Pumarol, he founded a spoken word band called El Hombrecito, which has released three albums.

He previously co-directed the digital poetry magazine Ping Pong, which published a generation of young poets and was characterized by translations and essays that addressed new poetic trends. From 2013 to 2020 he was chief editor of Revista Global, editing almost forty issues. Also, as an editor, in 2022, he edited the trilingual poetry anthology: On/Off-Shore: Poets of the Caribbean and Caribbean Diaspora.

== Books ==
=== Poetry collections ===
- Jarrón y otros poemas. Editorial Betania, Madrid, 2004.
- Postales, 2009.
- Anoche soñé que era un DJ / Last Night I Dreamt I Was A DJ. Translated by P. Scott Cunningham and Hoyt Rogers. Jai-Alai Books, 2014.
- La Marilyn Monroe de Santo Domingo. Ilustraciones de Nono Bandera. Galería Estampa, Biblioteca Americana, Madrid, 2017
- Llegó el fin del mundo a mi barrio. Valparaíso ediciones, México, 2017.
- Este es el futuro que estabas esperando, Seix Barral, Bogotá, 2017.
- Mar de la Intranquilidad. Ilustraciones de Nono Bandera. Espacio mínimo, Galería de Arte, 2024.
- Desarmando la biblioteca de mi padre, Fondo de cultura Económica, Bogotá, 2024.

=== Short story collections ===
- Págales tú a los Psicoanalistas (For the Psychoanalysts, You Pick Up the Tab!) Editorial Ferilibro, Santo Domingo, 2007.

=== Nonfiction collections ===
- En Rosario no se baila cumbia. Folia, Buenos Aires, 2011
- En Granada no duerme nadie. El nocturno diurno, Managua, 2013
- La trilogía de los festivales. Ping Pong Ediciones, Santo Domingo, 2016.
- Lo que trajo el mar. Reedición aumentada. Laguna libros, Bogotá, Colombia, 2020.
- Bajo otras luces. Yarumo libros, Medellín, Colombia, 2025.
- Mi segundo viaje al Pico Duarte. Ping Pong Ediciones, Santo Domingo, 2026.

=== Edited volumes ===
- Tejiendo Redes: El VIH visto a través de 14 activistas de Latinoamérica. Editor CLACSO, Buenos Aires, 2021.
- On/Off-Shore: Poets of the Caribbean and Caribbean Diaspora. Jai-Alai Books, Miami, 2022.

== El Hombrecito albums and live concerts ==
- Llegó El Hombrecito (2009) album
- La última vuelta (2009) album
- La última vuelta en vivo en el Palacio de Bellas Artes (2012) live concert
- Fin de la transmisión (2019) album
- Radioteatro "En vivo en Casa de Teatro" (2019) live concert
