= Alan Mills (poet) =

Guatemalan poet and writer

Alan Mills (born 1979) is a Guatemalan poet and writer. His poetry has been included in numerous anthologies of contemporary Spanish poetry and he has also been translated into multiple languages. In 2007, he published the micro-novel Síncopes. Most recently, he has published a book in English about hacker culture titled Hacking Coyote. In 2017, he was named as one of the Bogota39, a list of the most promising young writers in Latin America.

He has lived in Berlin since 2012, where he is working on a doctoral thesis about indigenista science fiction.
