= Cristian Romero (Paraguayan footballer) =

Paraguayan footballer

Personal information
- Full name: Cristian Reinaldo Romero Vallejo
- Date of birth: 6 January 1989 (age 37)
- Place of birth: Villeta, Paraguay
- Height: 1.89 m (6 ft 2 1/2 in)
- Position: Forward

Senior career*
Years	Team	Apps	(Gls)
2007–2009	Tembetary		
2009–2010	Boca Unidos	0	(0)
2010	Boyacá Chicó	11	(0)
2012	Deportivo Mandiyú	3	(1)
2013–2014	Textil Mandiyú	23	(0)
2014–2015	Fontana		
2016	Ferroviario	6	(1)
2016	Fontana		
2019	Defensores de Vilelas	5	(0)
- * Club domestic league appearances and goals

Cristian Reinaldo Romero Vallejo (born 6 January 1989) is Paraguayan former professional footballer who played as a forward.

== Career ==
Romero started his senior career with Tembetary in 2007. Two years later he joined Argentine Primera B Nacional team Boca Unidos but left soon after without making a league appearance. Romero then agreed to sign for Categoría Primera A club Boyacá Chicó in Colombia. He made his professional debut in a league match versus Deportivo Pereira on 8 August 2010. He appeared in ten further fixtures for Boyacá before departing. Spells with Corrientes clubs Deportivo Mandiyú and Textil Mandiyú followed. 2014 saw Romero join Torneo Federal B's Fontana. He joined Ferroviario in 2016 but returned to Fontana months later.

In 2019, Romero completed a move to Torneo Regional Federal Amateur side Defensores de Vilelas. He appeared five times for them.
