= Cristian Romero (writer) =

Colombian writer

Cristian Romero is a Colombian writer. He studied Audiovisual Communication and Multimedia at the Universidad de Antioquia. He published his short stories in different literary magazines in Colombia. His first book of stories Ahora solo queda la ciudad came out in 2016. This was followed by his first novel Después de la ira.

In 2017, he was named by the Hay Festival as one of the Bogotá39, a selection of the best young writers in Latin America.
