= Óscar Collazos =

Óscar Collazos (29 August 1942 in Bahía Solano – 17 May 2015 in Bogotá) was a Colombian writer, journalist, essayist and literary critic. He wrote 18 novels, 17 collections of short stories and a wide-ranging series of critical works. Among his best-known books are: Rencor (2006), Cartagena en la olla podrida (2001), Desplazados del futuro (2003), Señor sombra (2009), En la laguna más profunda (2011) and Tierra quemada (2013).
