= Antonio Ungar =

Colombian writer (born 1974)

- Born: 1974 (age 51–52); Bogotá, Colombia
- Education: National University of Colombia
- Writing career
- Genres: Novels, short stories
- Notable works: The Ears of the Wolf, Flyings Carrots, Three White Coffins
- Literary movement: Latin American post-Realism

Antonio Ungar (born Bogotá, 1974) is a Colombian writer. His novels have been translated into seven languages and his short stories have been included in more than twenty anthologies in five languages.

His novel Tres ataúdes blancos was awarded the Herralde Prize in 2010, and was short-listed for the Rómulo Gallegos Prize in 2011. Other prizes and distinctions include representing Colombia in the IWP Residence (2005), representing Colombia in the Granta Latin-American Anthology (2007), being short-listed for the 2008 Courier International Prize (second best foreign book published in France), and being awarded the National Journalism Prize Simón Bolívar (2005).

His last two novels, Mírame (2019) and Eva y las fieras (2022), are currently being translated into French and German.

== Personal life ==
He is married to the Palestinian writer Zahiye Kundos.

== Works ==
=== Short stories ===
- "Trece Circos y otros cuentos comunes" (Thirteen circuses and other common tales, 2008)

=== Novels ===
- Zanahorias voladoras (Flying Carrots, 2003)
- Las orejas del lobo (The Ears of the Wolf; shortlisted for the Courier International Prize, 2005)
- Tres ataúdes blancos (Three White Coffins; winner of the Premio Herralde); short listed for the Rómulo Gallegos Prize, 2010)
- Mírame (Look at me, 2019)
- Eva y las fieras (Eve and the wild animals, 2022)
