= Lola Copacabana =

Argentine writer, translator and editor

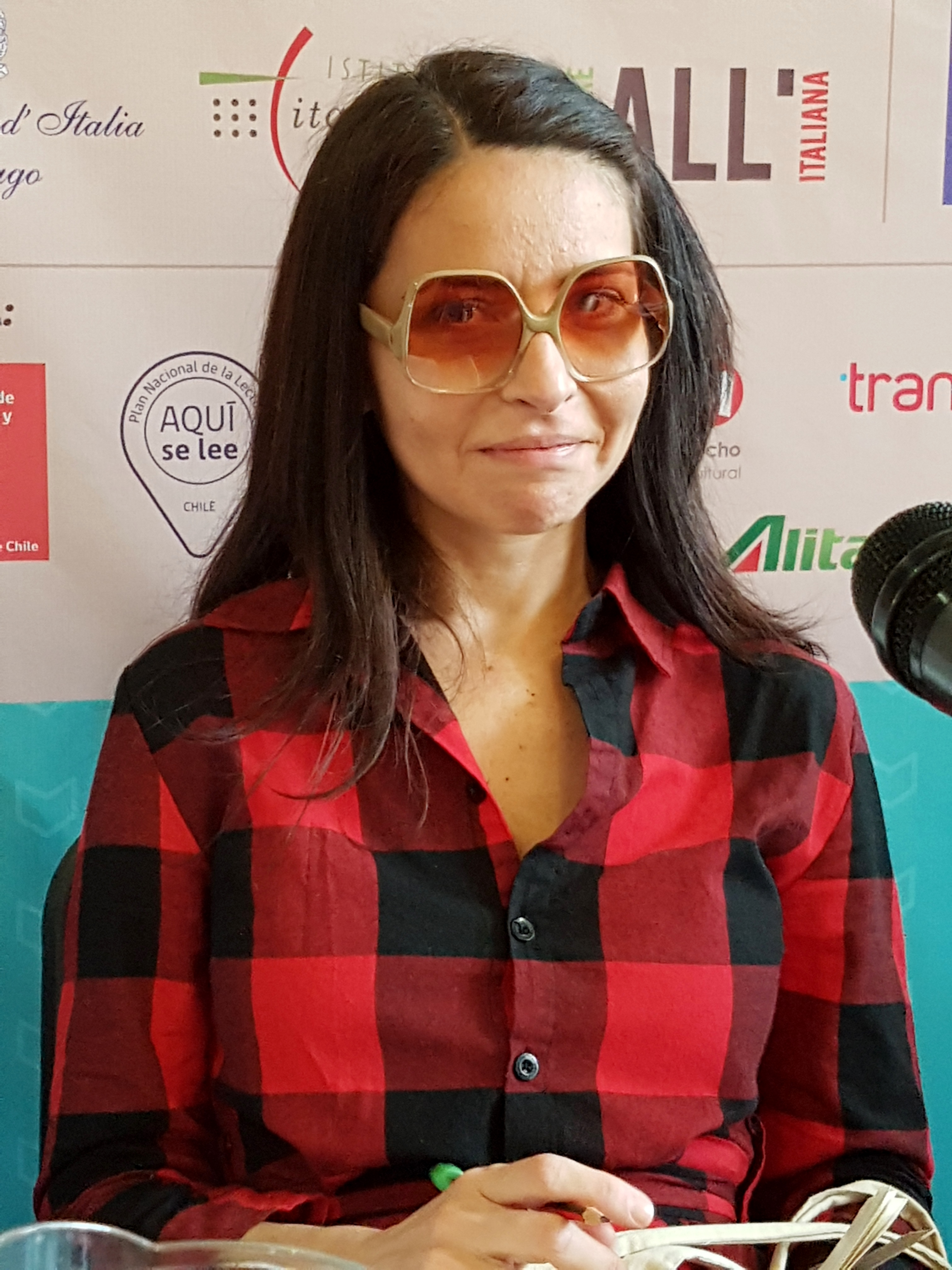
Copacabana, Lola -FILSA 2017

Inés Gallo de Urioste (born Buenos Aires, 1980), better known by her pseudonym Lola Copacabana or Lolita Copacabana, is an Argentine writer, translator and editor.

== Life ==
She was born in Buenos Aires in 1980. She became known through her blog JustLola, which began in 2003 and was written in a format similar to a traditional newspaper: small paragraphs that narrated different aspects of her life, from her fascination with Simone de Beauvoir to her personal relationships. The publisher Sudamericana proposed to publish these as a book, which appeared under the title Buena leche (Good milk: diaries of a (not so) formal young woman). The stories were written while she was between the ages of 19 and 23.

In addition to continuing her blog for ten years, she anthologized and translated into River Plate Spanish the volume Alt-lit: literatura norteamericana actual, working in collaboration with Hernán Vanoli. This 2014 volume explored the concept of alternative literature, especially as mediated through the culture and practices of the Internet. She also translated a book of "subversive" short stories by the American writer Paula Bomer titled Baby and other Stories (Bebé y otros cuentos).

With Vanoli, she also founded the publishing house Momofuku, which published her first novel, Aleksandr Solzhenitsyn. Crimen y castigo en la Ciudad Autónoma de Buenos Aires (also published in Spain in 2019).

In 2017, she was named as one of the Bogota39, a selection of the best young Latin American authors writing today. The others included Samanta Schweblin, the Brazilian Natalia Borges Polesso, María José Caro from Peru, Liliana Colanzi from Bolivia, Gabriela Jauregui and Copacabana.

As of 2022 she was still one of the managers of the Momofuku publishing company and she intended to study Creative Writing at the University of Iowa.
