= María José Caro =

Peruvian writer (born 1985)

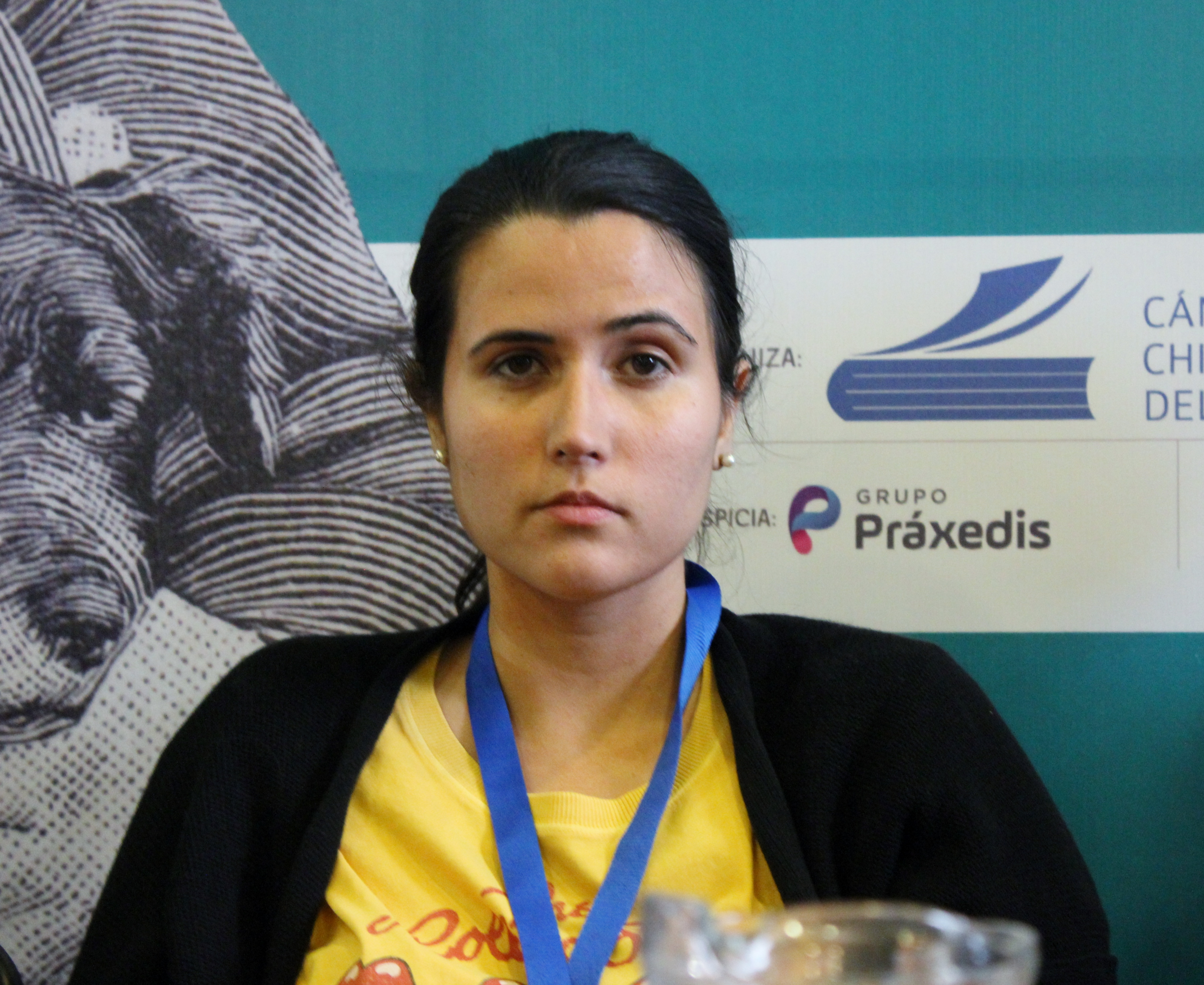
María José Caro, 2018

María José Caro (born Lima, 1985) is a Peruvian writer.

== Life ==
Caro was born in Lima in 1985. She has a master's degree from the Universidad Complutense de Madrid. She has published three books, including two short story collections - ¿Qué tengo de malo? (What is wrong with me?) (2017), La primaria (Elementary School) (2012) - and a novel Perro de negros (Black Dogs) (2016). In 2017, she was named as one of the Bogotá39, a list of the best young writers in Latin America. The other 38 included Samanta Schweblin & Lola Copacabana from Argentina, the Mexican Gabriela Jauregui, Liliana Colanzi from Bolivia.
