= Gabriela Jauregui =

Mexican writer, poet and critic (born 1979)

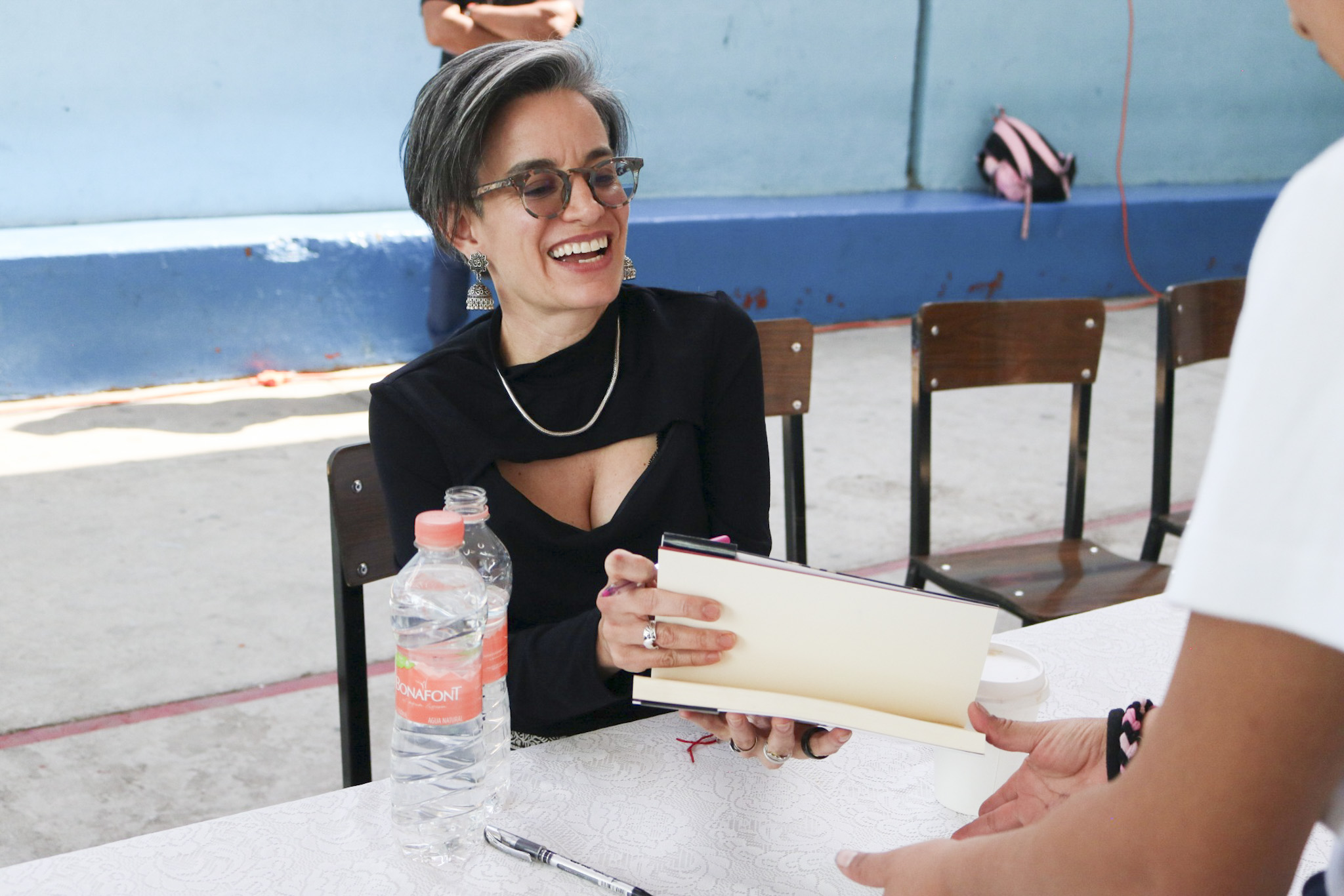
- Born: 1979 (age 46–47); Mexico City, Mexico
- Education: UC Riverside (MFA); UC Irvine (MA); University of Southern California (PhD)
- Occupations: Writer, poet, critic
- Writing career
- Language: Spanish, English
- Genres: Poetry, short stories, criticism awards = Bogota39 (2017)

Gabriela Jauregui (born 1979) is a Mexican writer, poet and critic.

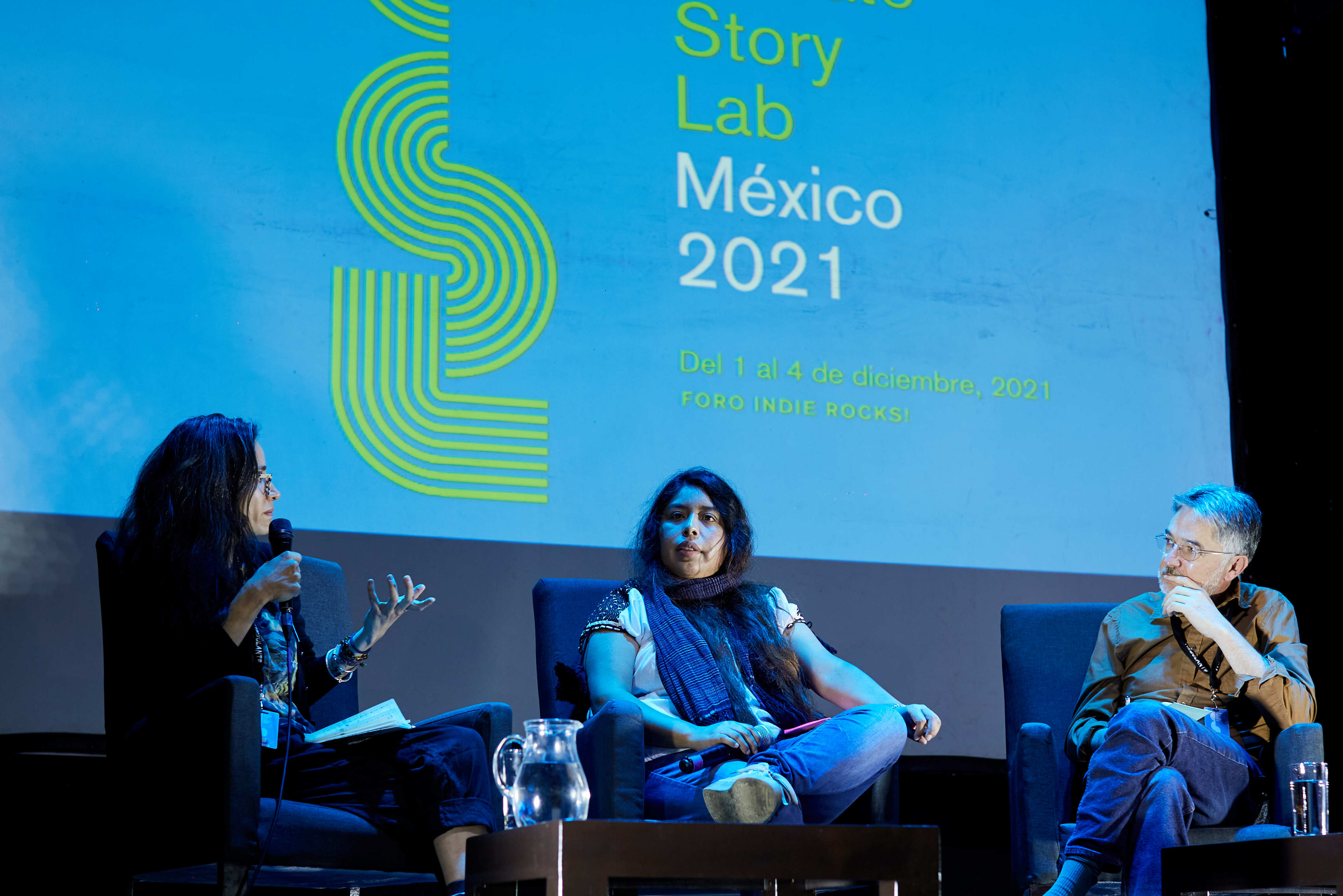
Gabriela Jauregui in 2021

Jauregui was born in 1979 and raised in Mexico City. She obtained an MFA from UC Riverside, an MA from UC Irvine and a PhD in comparative literature from the University of Southern California. She has published extensively in both English and Spanish, including the poetry collection Controlled Decay (2008) and the short story collection La memoria de las cosas (2015). She was also one of the coauthors of Taller de taquimecanografía (2012). She is the cofounder of the independent publisher sur+.

In 2017, she was included in the Bogota39 list of the promising young writers in Latin America. The other 38 included Samanta Schweblin, María José Caro from Peru, Liliana Colanzi from Bolivia and Lola Copacabana.
