= Gatopardo (magazine) =

- Front cover of issue 117 of Gatopardo featuring Mexican actor José María Yazpik.
- Editorial Director: Felipe Restrepo
- Categories: Culture, News magazine
- Frequency: Monthly
- Founded: 1999
- First issue: 1 April 2000
- Company: Travesias media
- Based in: Mexico City
- Language: Spanish
- Website: www.gatopardo.com
- ISSN: 0124-616X
- OCLC: 47261589

Gatopardo (Spanish: Leopard) is a Mexican monthly news magazine focusing feature stories and lifestyle from a Latin-American perspective. The magazine was founded and first published in Colombia. It had from the beginning an international perspective in reporting with the backing of Publicaciones Semana S.A. of Colombia, BB&M of Panama, and Reader's Digest of Mexico, and first edited by Miguel Silva and Rafael Molano. Starting in July 2006 with issue N. 70, Gatopardo moved and remains based in Mexico City, keeping the same editorial style and Latin-American perspective, but providing a greater coverage on Mexican topics.

== Beginnings ==
Founded in April 1999 in Bogotá, Colombia, by journalists Miguel Silva and Rafael Molano, Gatopardo was born as a novel proposal to create, for the first time in Latin America, a high-impact magazine with reports and journalistic chronicles that would explain the paradoxes and contradictions of the region, such as inequality, corruption and social movements, cultural events and show business. The magazine's name is inspired by the title of the novel The Leopard, by Giuseppe Tomasi di Lampedusa. As a publication, Gatopardo also seeks to confront "gatopardismo", the paradox posed in the novel, which refers to "changing so that everything remains the same".

From its beginnings, Gatopardo's objective was to challenge the monothematic and specialized cultural publications that proliferated from the 1980s onwards and, instead, to defend modern reportage, the chronicle and any narrative journalistic text that explored beyond the merely informative.

To begin creating texts and images, the founders brought together a distinguished group of collaborators that included writers Antonio Tabucchi and Juan Villoro, renowned photographer Sebastião Salgado and journalist Tomás Eloy Martínez. The first printed issue of Gatopardo was published exactly one year after its foundation, in April 2000, and edited by Grupo de Publicaciones Latinoamericanas.

In the first editorial, founder Rafael Molano expressed that it was undeniable that the inspiration for this project was a group of American magazines called The Smart Magazines: Vanity Fair, The New Yorker, Esquire and Life. However, Gatopardo differed in the range of topics and the angles in which they were approached, since they were primarily focused on Latin America: "It is a monthly magazine of well-told stories about people of power, art, current affairs, where the most exciting chronicles of anonymous characters and celebrities are concentrated and where the secrets of everyday life are revealed".

From the beginning, Gatopardo has been committed to offering texts of the highest quality to all of Latin America and to Spanish-speaking readers in the United States. Month after month, the editorial staff contacted the best writers and journalists in the world to talk about diverse and interesting topics, from politics to art, fashion and guerrilla warfare, cinema and sports. In its early years, known as "the Colombian era", Gatopardo's pages featured great writers such as Ernesto Sábato, Carlos Fuentes, Carlos Monsiváis, Martín Caparrós and Alma Guillermoprieto. During this period, Gatopardo also sought to have cells throughout the region and texts from Argentina, Mexico, Colombia and Cuba were published.

At that time, Gatopardo was printed in the most common magazine format, that is, on coated paper and A4 format; its print run was monthly; stock photographs were mostly used for its covers. These featured both media and antagonistic characters: Subcomandante Marcos (now Subcomandante Galeano) and Tom Cruise or Fidel Castro or Jennifer Aniston but also Homer Simpson.
