= Liliana Colanzi =

Bolivian writer

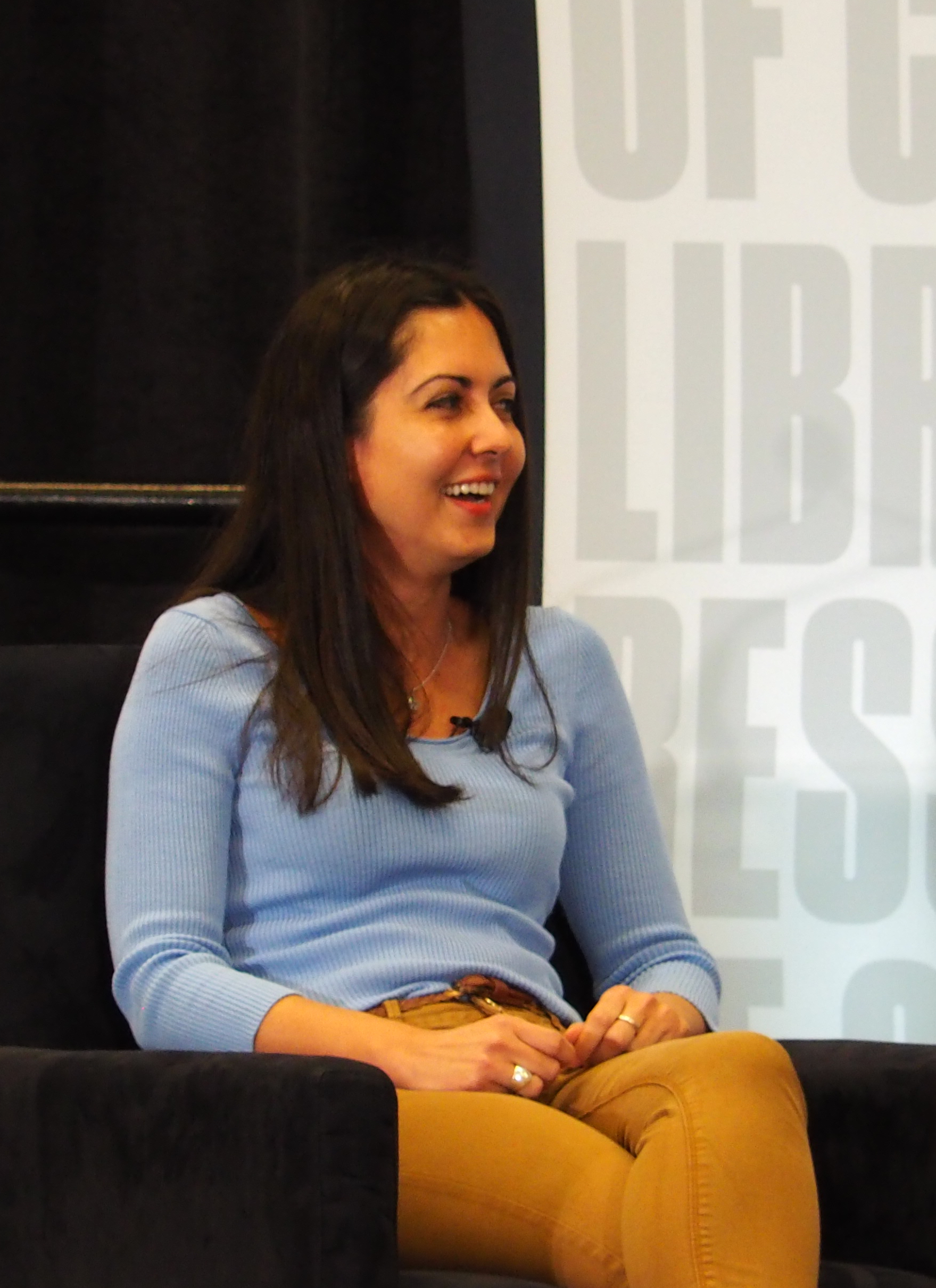
- Born: Santa Cruz de la Sierra
- Education: University of Cambridge, Private University of Santa Cruz de la Sierra
- Occupations: Writer, journalist, essayist, prosaist
- Employer: Cornell University
- Awards: Premio Internacional de Literatura Aura Estrada (2015)

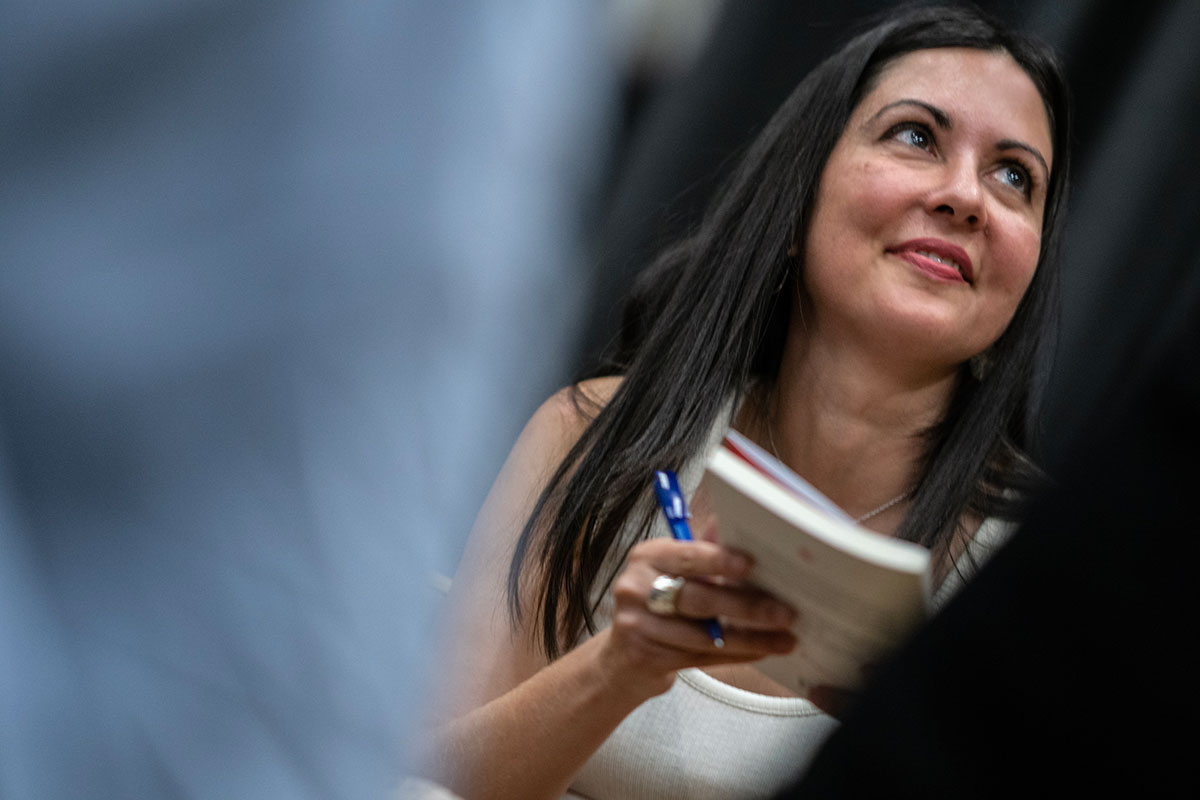
LiteratureXchange Festival (2025) in Aarhus, Denmark

Liliana Colanzi Serrate (born 1981) is a Bolivian writer.

== Life ==
Colanzi was born in Santa Cruz, Bolivia, in 1981, and studied at the Private University of Santa Cruz de la Sierra (UPSA) and the University of Cambridge. She obtained a doctorate in Comparative Literature from Cornell University, where she now teaches.

She is the author of four collections of short stories: Vacaciones permanentes (2010); La ola (2014); Nuestro mundo muerto (2016), which has been translated into English by Jessica Sequeira; and Ustedes brillan en lo oscuro (2022), which was translated into English by Chris Andrews as You Glow in the Dark. The final and eponymous short story of You Glow In The Dark is a fictionalized account of the Goiânia accident.

In 2017, Colanzi was named one of the best young writers in Latin America as part of Bogotá39.

== Works ==
=== Short story collections ===
- Vacaciones permanentes (2010)
- La ola (2014)
- Nuestro mundo muerto (2016). Our Dead World, Jessica Sequeira (Dalkey Archive, 2017)
- Ustedes brillan en lo oscuro (2022). You Glow in the Dark, trans. Chris Andrews (New Directions, 2024)
