= Pablo Montoya (author) =

Colombian writer (born 1963)

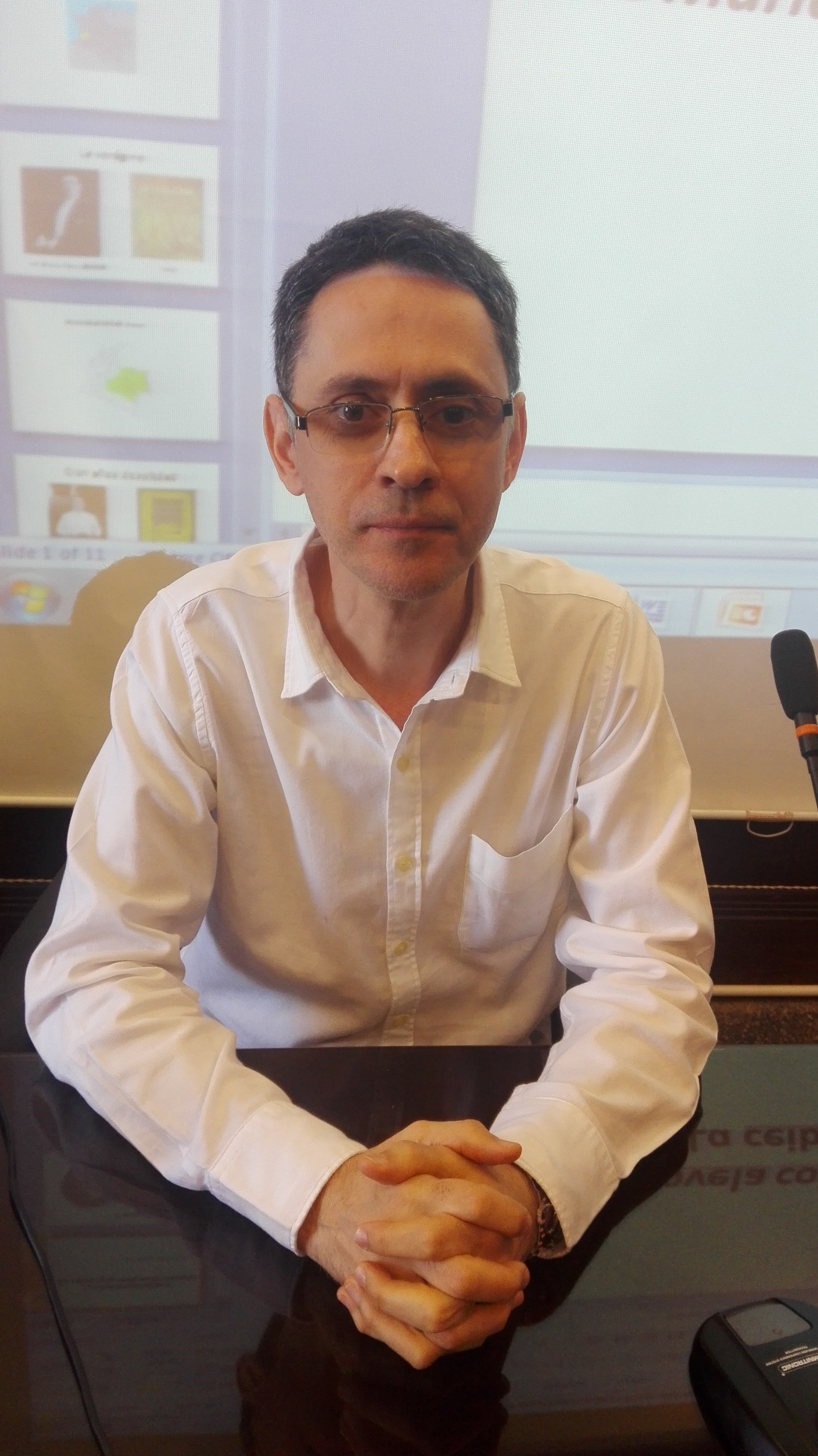
Pablo Montoya in 2016

Pablo José Montoya Campuzano (born 1963, in Barrancabermeja) is a Colombian writer. He is best known for his novel Tríptico de la infamia which won the Romulo Gallegos Prize in 2015. He is as of 2016, the fifth Colombian to obtain this recognition, being preceded by Gabriel García Márquez in 1972, Manuel Mejía Vallejo in 1989, Fernando Vallejo in 2003 and William Ospina in 2009. He studied music at Escuela Superior de música de Tunja and holds a degree in philosophy and literature from Universidad Santo Tomás in Bogotá. He obtained his master's and doctorate in Hispanic and Latin American Studies from the University of Paris III: Sorbonne Nouvelle.

He is currently a professor of literature at University of Antioquia. He has also been a visiting professor at the universities of Mar del Plata and the University of Paris III: Sorbonne Nouvelle. In his work, he talks about history, music, travel, eroticism, the fine arts with the situation of exile and violence of contemporary man. Always close to poetry, his writing carefully handles language. His books present a moving battle between misery and irony, erudition and hopelessness. His novels, short stories and critical texts have been featured in numerous Colombian and foreign publications. His translations of French and African writers have also been published in different magazines and newspapers in Latin America and Europe.

== Prizes and recognitions ==
- Premio del Concurso Nacional de Cuento “Germán Vargas”, 1993
- Scholarship for foreign writers, Centre national du livre, France, 1999
- Autores Antioqueños prize for his book Habitantes, 2000
- Prize Alcadía de Medellín for his book Réquiem por un fantasma, 2005
- Creation Scholarship Medellín Mayor's Office for his book El beso de la noche, 2007
- Scholarship for literary research Ministerio de Cultura de Colombia, 2008
- Creation Scholarship Medellín Mayor's Office, 2012
- Premio Rómulo Gallegos for the novel Tríptico de la infamia, 2015
- Premio José Donoso, 2016
