= Our Lady of the Assassins (novel) =

1994 novel by Fernando Vallejo

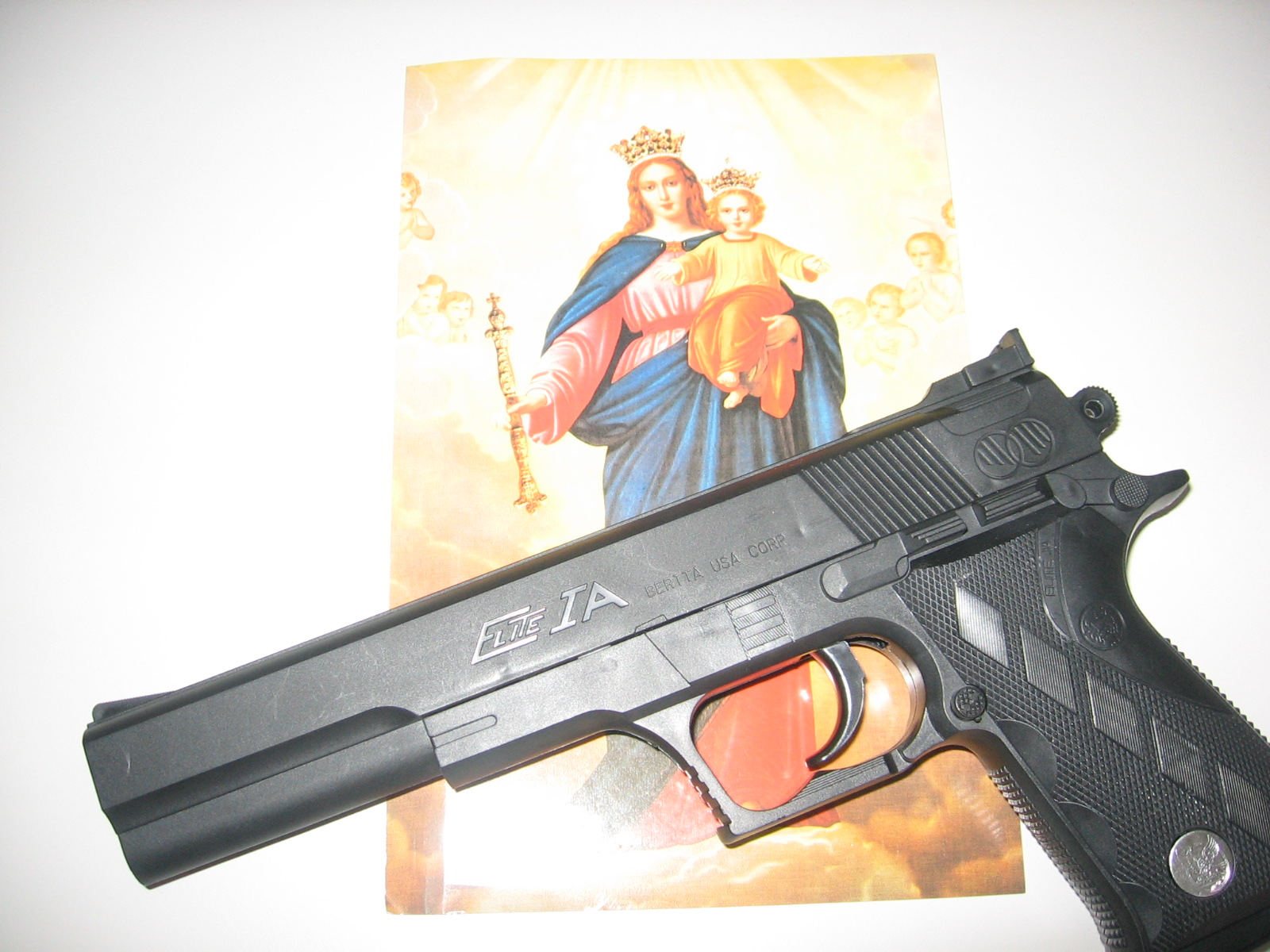
- Author: Fernando Vallejo
- Original title: La virgen de los sicarios
- Language: Spanish
- Genre: Narcoliteratura
- Publication date: 1994
- Publication place: Colombia
- Media type: Print (hardback & paperback)

Our Lady of the Assassins (Spanish title: La virgen de los sicarios) is a semi-autobiographical novel by the Colombian writer Fernando Vallejo about an author in his fifties who returns to his hometown of Medellín after 30 years of absence to find himself trapped in an atmosphere of violence and murder caused by drug cartel warfare. The novel was later adapted into a film that received different international recognitions like the Award of the Italian Senate, the Venice Film Festival (2000) as the best Latin American film and the Havana International Festival Nuevo Cine (2000).

A growing body of scholarship and critical commentary already exist about this controversial work, most of it in Spanish. The brief sections below attempt to give the reader a basic understanding of some main approaches to what undoubtedly is a central work in Colombian fiction of the 1990s. An elaborated and discussed fictional work dealing with events related to the drug trade and its deleterious consequences in Colombian society.

Notice: Any text from the novel in this article is a free translation by Wikipedians, and should not be considered official. The novel was formally translated into English in 2001.

== Synopsis ==
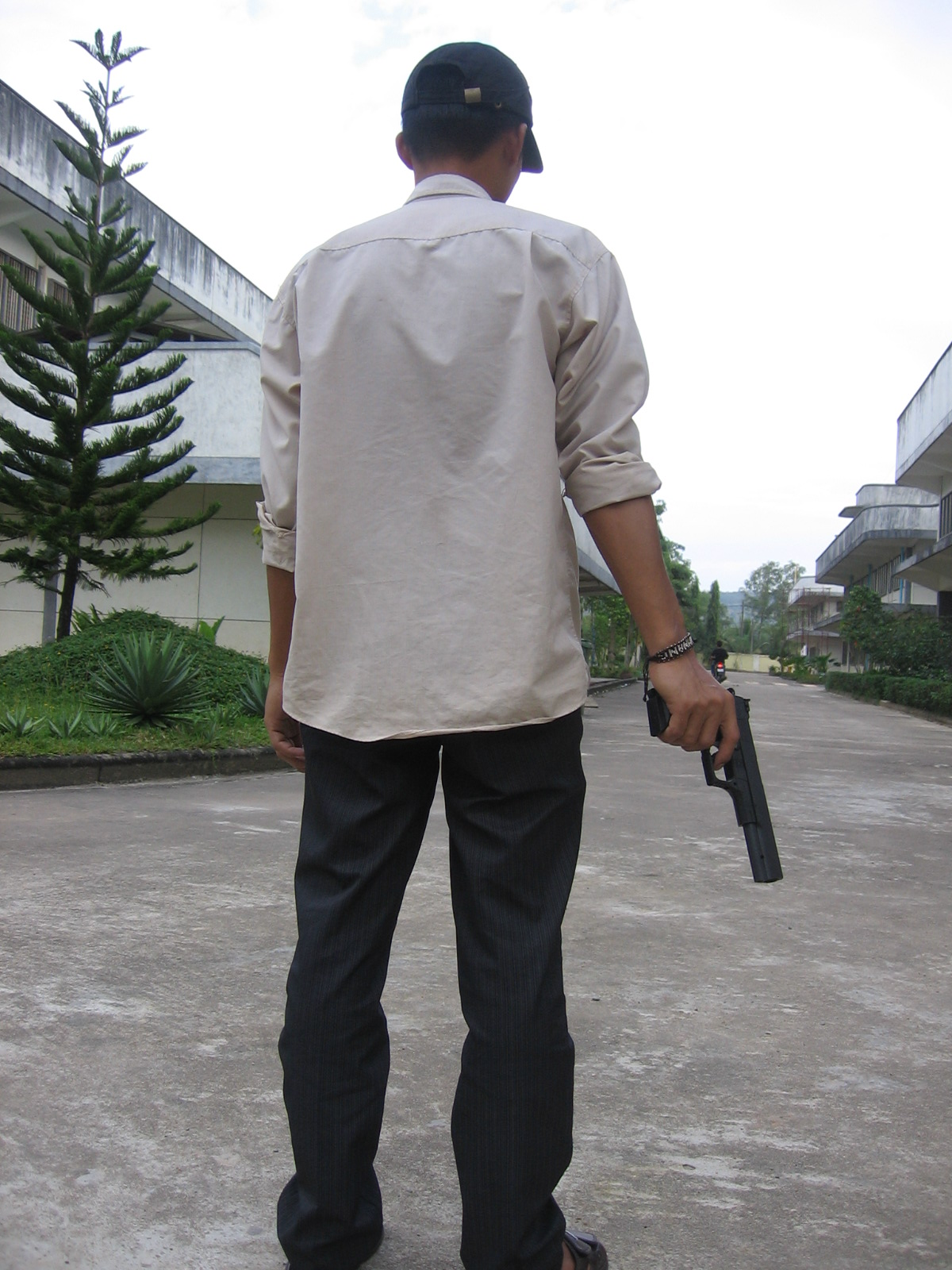
Alexis needs no reason to kill: like an Angel of Death he opens fire on anybody who rubs him the wrong way.

A writer named Fernando returns to Medellín, after an absence of 30 years, to find the place transformed into Colombia's "capital of hate." Fernando meets Alexis, a 16-year-old male prostitute and sicario - a contract killer - with whom he falls in love. Alexis needs no reason to kill: like an Angel of Death he opens fire on anybody who rubs him the wrong way. Fernando and Alexis are bound by an intense passion as they wander from church to church, murder to murder. Alexis explains the meanings and symbols of the dangerous world of Medellín guns, while the author recounts his childhood memories in a Medellín that is no longer the one he once knew. When Alexis is finally killed by two teenagers on a motorbike, Fernando seeks out his killer.

He finds Wilmar, another sicario with a surprising resemblance to the late Alexis, not only physically but also in his behaviour. Attempting to recapture his old life with Alexis, he soon finds out that he has started a relationship with the killer of Alexis, but chooses not to kill him as Wilmar explains that Alexis had killed his brother. Fernando asks Wilmar to leave the country with him. The boy agrees, but while visiting his mother to say goodbye, he too is shot and killed. Fernando winds up alone in the middle of a city where love seems impossible.

== Historical context ==
The geographic context of the novel is the city of Medellín (Colombia) during the 1990s, a difficult time for Colombian society, when mafias declared a terrorist war against the State and Colombian institutions, led by the infamous Pablo Escobar Gaviria. The second largest Colombian city was the main scene where the mafias wanted to dominate the nation by terrorists attacks, using very young killers from the slums, who were known as sicarios.

Vallejo illustrates in his work the emergence of new social groups emerging from the problem of drugs. The sicarios (hired assassins) are the result of that tension. Most of them were boys ready to kill for money, the same offered by the criminal organizations, to exterminate those who would dare to challenge the power of the mafias or put in danger their business. If authorities would not accept their corruption activities, the mafias resorted to sending a young assassin (el sicario). Normally, the sicario kills from a motorbike. Paradoxically, Colombian mafias keeps a great Catholic devotion and honor traditions like the one of Mary Help of Christians. This Marian devotion is very popular among the poor population of the city. The sicarios show great respect to Mary and pray to her for protection in their work of killing (She is the Virgen of the Sicarios.)

The mafias also gained the appreciation of the Medellín slums doing for them what several governments did not do for years. Pablo Escobar provided numerous things to impoverished neighborhoods, including housing, sport areas, electricity and schools, a factor that gave more popular power to the mafias, who were praised as heroes of the people. Boys (in many cases also girls), were willing to work for such popular benefactors, even killing whomever. The mafias played on social inequalities to guarantee their influence.

After the death of Pablo Escobar on 2 December 1993, by a special unit of the National Police of Colombia, the Medellín Cartel went through an organizational crisis and the sicarios formed gun groups in the barrios. They began to dispute urban territories. The situation worsened when Colombian guerrillas infiltrated the cities trying to bring their war, traditionally in the countrysides, to the main urban centers. A real civil war happened in the 1990s' Medellín.

The story of Fernando, Alexis and Wilmar happens after the death of Pablo Escobar. The two boys are part of an army of killers without a strong capo. Without jobs, the boys wander the city, making it a dangerous place and killing whomever they consider dangerous for their own safety. Male prostitution became an option too. Alexis lives in Barrio Santo Domingo and Wilmar in Barrio La Francia, two slum quarters of the North of Medellín.

== Themes ==
=== Urban violence ===
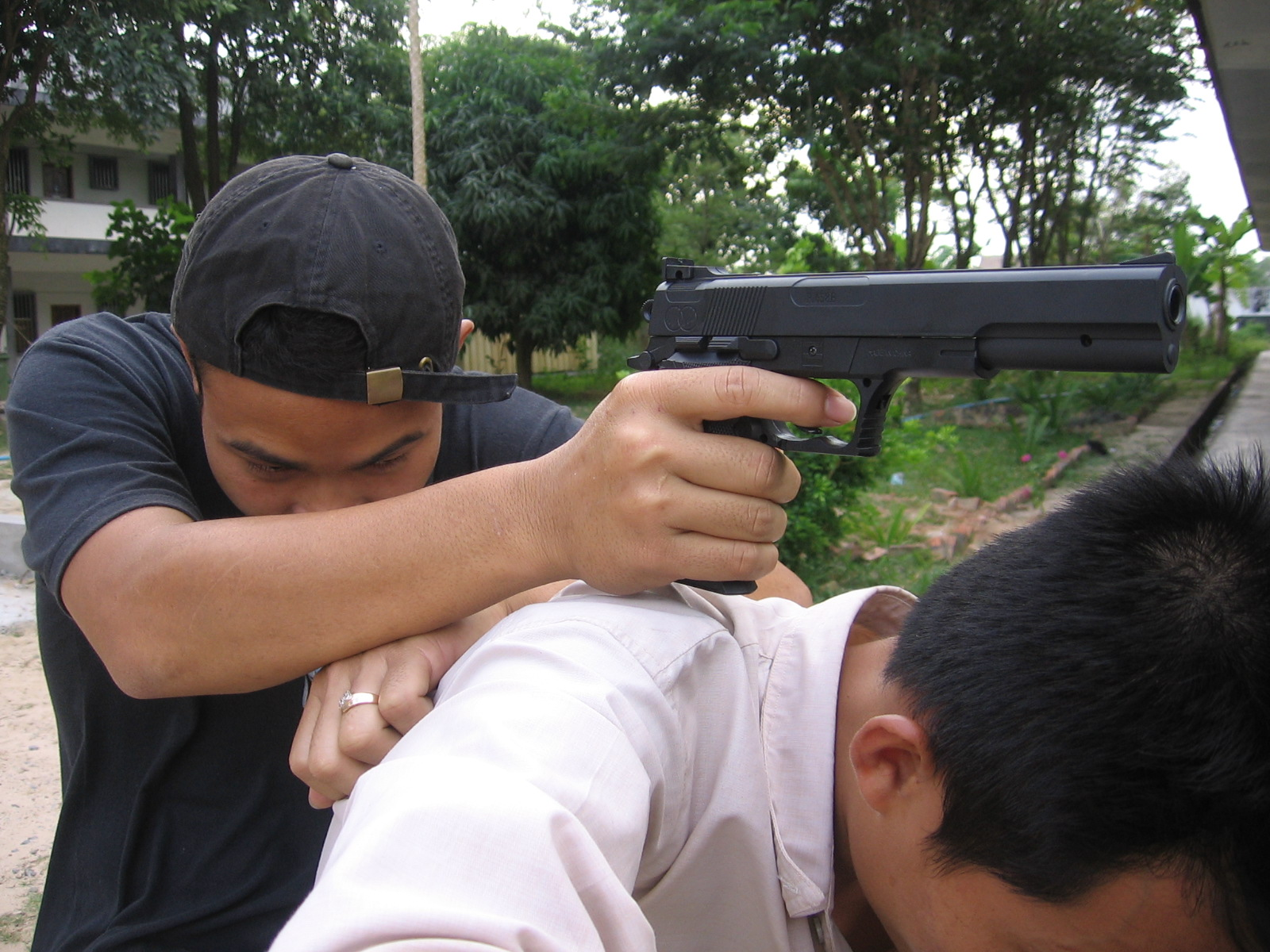
"Grandfather, if in any case you are listening to me from the other side of the eternity, I will tell you what is a sicario: a little boy, sometimes a child, who kills on demand."

Urban violence, common to many other Latin American cities with the same social roots and political conflicts, is the central theme of the novel. In Colombia, violence has been historically associated with the countryside, but during the second part of the 20th century it came to the cities due to the growth of drug cartels, which imposed their rules of violence and corruption. Medellín, the old industrialist center, became the main headquarter of the powerful mafia cartel of Pablo Escobar. He changed the textile city into one of the most violent of Latin America for that time. Pablo Escobar was shot down in 1993.

According to La Jornada Jalisco, Medellín was the "most violent city in Latin America" in the 1990s. According to El Colombiano, between 1992 - 2002, there were 42,393 violent deaths recorded in Medellín.

=== Hired killers ===
The Colombian mafias and especially the Medellín Cartel imposed a modality of crime with the hired killers (sicarios in Spanish) to murder political opponents or any authority that could put in danger their dirty business. What became astonishing was that the mafias were contracting teenagers from the slums of the big cities. Boys from marginalized barrios (and many cases also girls), became killing machines ready to murder for the service of the mafias.

Pablo Escobar offered three to five million pesos to anyone who killed a police officer.

"Of course, you do not need that I explain what is a sicario. My grandfather yes, he would need it. But my grandfather died years and years ago. My poor grandfather died without knowing neither the elevated train not the sicarios, smoking Victoria cigarettes that I guess, you have not heard even mention. The Victorias were the Marijuana of the elders, and the Marijuana is unclean smoked cocaine that the youth smoke today to see the crooked bent reality, is'n it? Correct me if I am mistaken. Grandfather, if in any case you are listening to me from the other side of the eternity, I will tell you what is a sicario: a little boy, sometimes a child, who kills on demand. And the men? Generally the men no, here the sicarios are children or little boys, of twelve, fitfteen, seventeen years old, like Alexis, my darling: he had the eyes green, deep, pure, of a green with more value than any green of the Savannah. But if Alexis had the purity in his eyes, he had the heart damaged. And one day, when I loved him more, when I least expected, they killed him, like they will kill everybody. We go to the same hole of ashes, in the same Campos de Paz."

— Fernando Vallejo, la virgen de los sicarios, 1994

=== Medellín ===
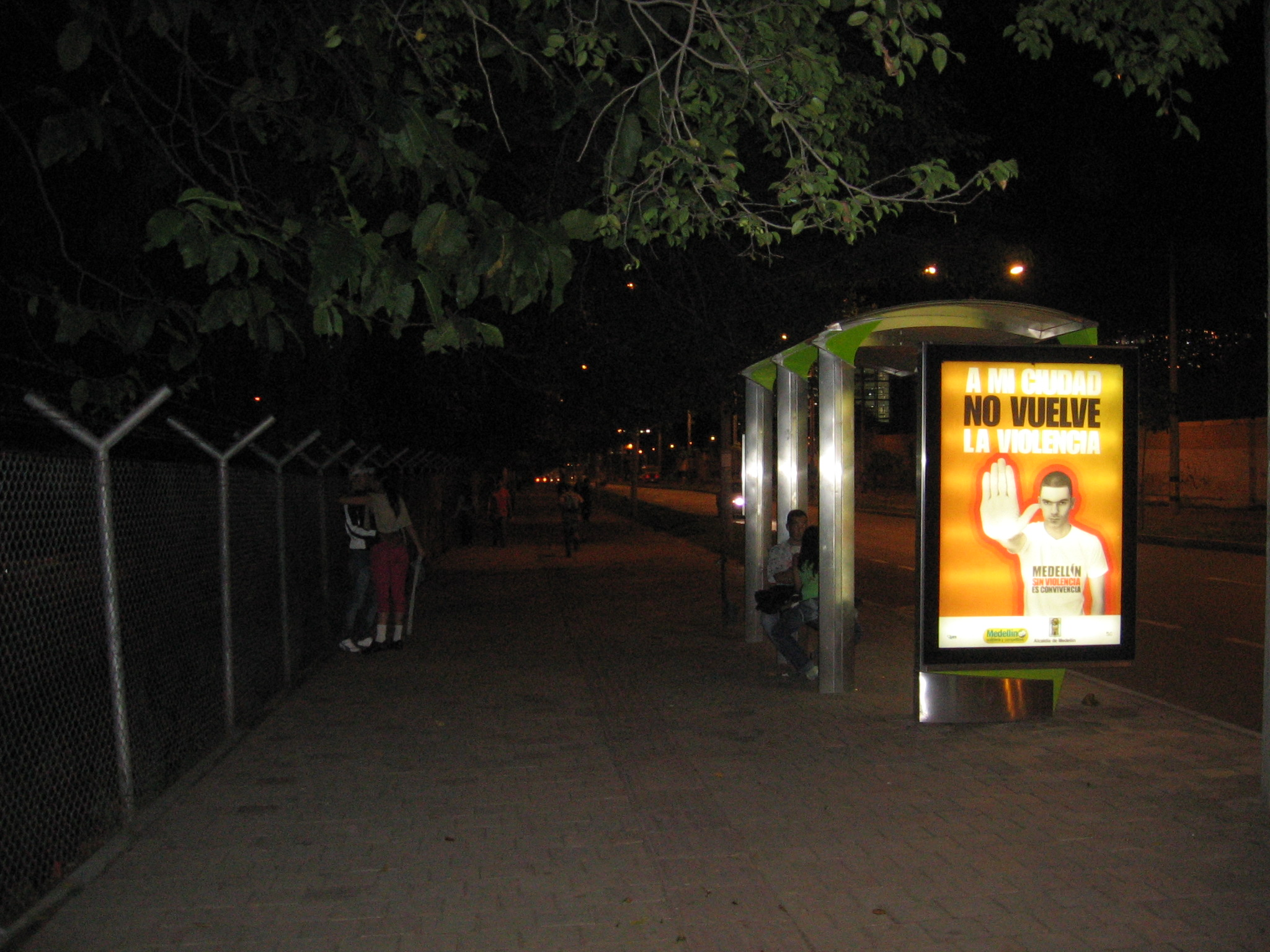
"A mi ciudad no vuelve la violencia" (Violence will not come back to my city), a promotional campaign of 2008 in Medellín. The first decade of the century has been of better improvement in what was the most violent city of Latin American in the 1990s.

The other central theme of the novel is the city of Medellín as the backdrop for the urban violence and young hired killers. Medellín as the birthplace of several writers has been the space for many other literary and documentary works of authors like Tomás Carrasquilla, Fernando González, Porfirio Barba Jacob, Manuel Mejía Vallejo, Gonzalo Arango, León de Greiff and many others. It is a city of a rigid and conservative Catholic tradition and one of the most important industrial and business centers of Colombia. It came into a social crisis at the end of the 20th century due to the emergence of the mafias. The reasons why an entrepreneurial urban center and the leader of the national economy during the 1950s and 1960s began to overflow with violence is a complex sociological matter that involves society, politics and the culture of contemporary Colombia. The work of Vallejo put in evidence a nostalgia for the lost role of a city dominated by the social chaos and far from the presence of the State. About this the author says:

"The big criminals of Colombia are the causative of this monstruos situation in which we are. They are grouped in the Conservative Party, the Liberal Party and the Catholic Church, which are the ones that have presided our lives during two hundred years that we have as an independent country. They have caused the drug dealers, because they cornered the people and our Antioquian race that was very entrepreneur, to that, because they closed the doors to the industry. First, with any kind of bureaucracies and demagogic. Then after because... Gaviria, this sinister character, the most harmful that Colombia has had, came and gave to it [the industry] the final blow and finished it. They have forced us to it: to the drug mafias, the crime! The Farc, the Eln and the Paramilitaries are a product of them: the Liberal Party and the Conservative Party. They did not arise by spontaneous generation. They rose because they closed the doors to a big number of Colombians. For example, to the three million ones, who are abroad."

— Fernando Vallejo, in Caracol Colombian Broadcast.

=== Homosexuality ===
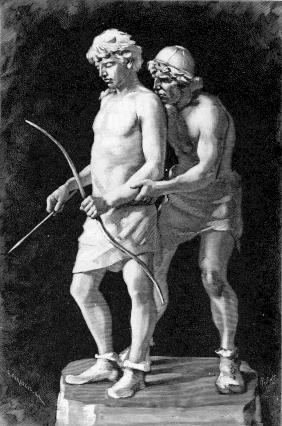
"Here I give you this beauty - said to me José Antonio when he introduced to me Alexis, who had already like ten dead guys. Alexis laughed and I did too and, of course, I did not believe, or better said, I did..." (Vallejo, La virgen de los sicarios).

The other theme is homosexuality. It is discussed in an open and natural way in a country where it is a taboo. Even if it appears as a secondary theme, because violence and sicarios are the main subjects, homosexuality in the novel calls strongly the attention of the reader. After all, an adult man has relationships with two male teenagers, who contrast their sexual preferences with the strong and male world of crime and guns. The website for education of Chile says to this regard:

"Who other than Vallejo, a polemic, irreverent, baroque, contradictory, critic and melancholic author, which is able to establish a relation with the letters to give freedom to a theme that the society and the world has imprisoned: the homosexual relation among an adult and a young."

In the novel, homosexuality is not insinuated or suggested with malice, but it is a natural part of the context of the work. The other characters around do not see to it with a kind of scandal or surprise, but as something natural. The theme is introduced in the novel like this:

"I asked him if he likes the women. "No", he answered with a resounding "no", so unexpected that I remained perplexed. And it was a "no" forever: for the present, for the past and for the future and for all eternity of God: Neither he has slept with no one, nor he was hoping to sleep. Alexis was unpredictable and he was becoming more extremist than me. That this was then what was behind those green eyes, a purity uncontaminated of women. And the most absolute true, without neither mitigate nor giving a fuck importance to what you or I say."

— Fernando Vallejo, La virgen de los sicarios, p.21

=== Popular religiosity ===
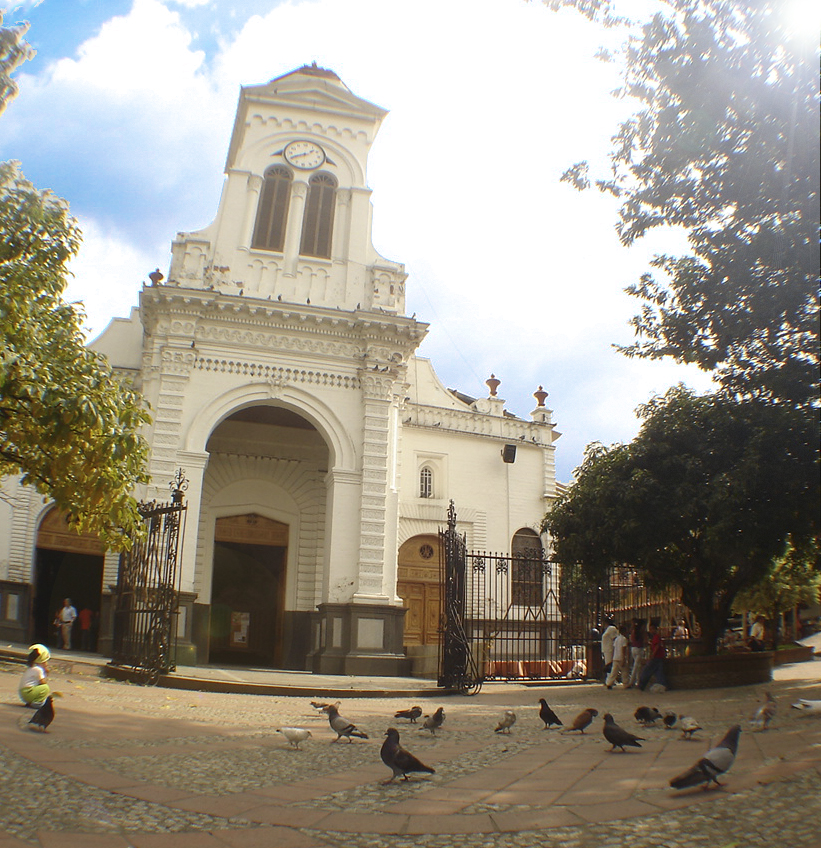
The Santa Ana Church in Sabaneta, main center for the devotion of Mary Help of Christians in Metropolitan Medellín. The place became a center of pilgrimage for the mafia and its sicarios. It is described in the novel.

Colombia is a country of a deep Catholicism mixed with strong tendencies of popular religiosity, which was born out of Spanish traditions in the Middle Ages, the ancestral beliefs of Afro-Americans and the American aborigines. Their ancestral beliefs were hidden in devotion to the saints. Popular religiosity appears as an alternative manifestation to the official religion as a way for people to seek their own relationships with the divine, out of vertical structures of power. Even if the official religion tries to integrate popular religiosity, popular religiosity holds its own freedom, separated from norms and doctrines and assumed especially by a marginalized and suffered group of peoples.

In Medellín, one of the most Catholic and conservative regions of the country, the popular religiosity got an unusual tone when it mixed with the urban violence and hired killers. One of the most popular devotions is the one to Mary Help of Christians, the one that inspired the title of the novel. The Sanctuary of Sabaneta (Santa Ana Church), became the site of pilgrimage for the mafia and its sicarios.

This Greek-Latin devotion became popular during the Middle Age when the Christian Europe gathered to defend itself from the Muslim invasions of the Ottoman Empire in 1572. Pope Pius V asked the Christian world to pray to Mary under the advocation of Maria Auxilium Christianorum to defeat the enemies of the Church. In this way, Mary Help of Christians is a military devotion, a "(...) powerful Virgin, great and illustrious rampart of the Church, wonderful Help of Christians", one that is "terrible as an army drawn up in battle array". She is enough for protection, because "you alone overcome every error in the world; in anxieties, in struggles, in every difficulty defend us from the enemy" and we do not fear because "at the hour of our death receive our souls into paradise".

This devotion fills the expectancies of a young sicario and he asked to María Auxiliadora, the Virgen of the sicarios, to free him from every "evil and danger". As it became a popular religiosity, there is not the figure of the priest. Fernando and Alexis visited several churches but in any they cannot find a priest to listen their anxieties. The sicario is the priest of his own religion. He wears scapulars with the image of the Virgin in his neck, his hands and feet to be protected at the time he will commit the murder.

For other sociologists, the Marian devotion of the young sicario is a cult to their mothers, la cucha ("mom" in the local jargon of Medellín). The theme was studied by the Medellian sociologist and journalist Alonso Salazar in his work No nacimos pa semilla, 1990, ("We were not born to be a seed"), the first author to follow a systematic study of the problems of the slums young people. He discovered a very strong matriarchal society with the absence of the figure of the male parent and the cult for the mother, the real one, who in the Medellín slums was in charge of the growing of the family. The figure of the Virgen, so strong and powerful, caring for a child, has a great influence on the boys who look for their best future and have in their minds the endures of their own mothers. When Fernando proposed to Wilmar to leave the country, the boy agreed, but he wanted to give something expensive to his mother before were to go abroad.

== Literary technique ==
=== Language and tone ===
In the novel, the tone is expressed through the first-person narrative, as it is common in all of Vallejo's works.

According to critics, the decision of Vallejo of speak in first person breaks the most obstinate tradition of literature of using an omniscient narrator who knows everything and sees everything, the novelist who can cross with his eyes the walls and reads the thought.

For the Colombian critic J.O. Melo, the work is written in an admirable style and sometimes poetic, where the jargon of the sicarios is mixed with local expressions and Antioquian terms in such a way that alternate among the cynicism and the sensibility, the moving and the aggressive.

=== Setting ===
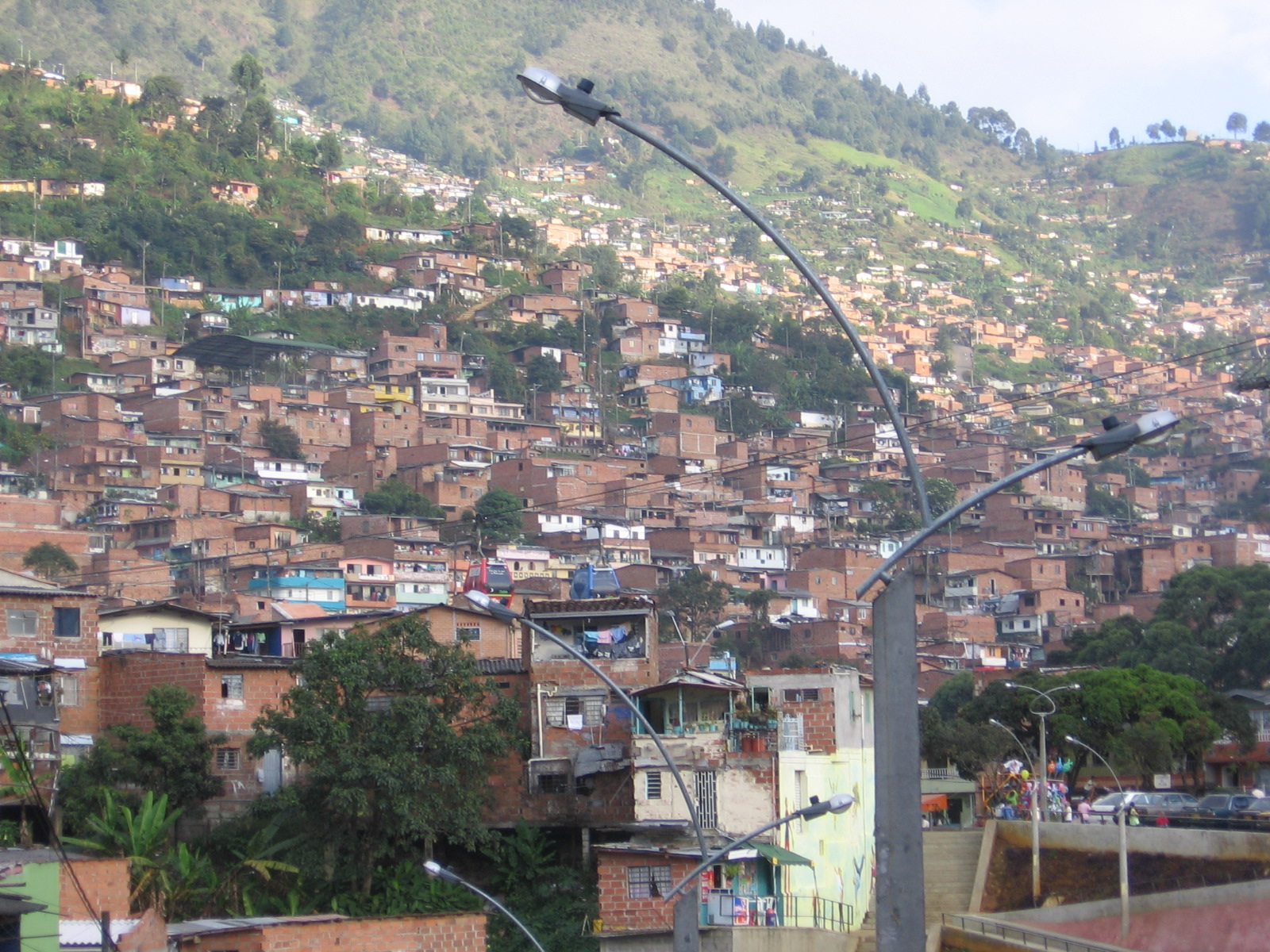
Barrio Santo Domingo Savio, the slum quarter of Alexis.

Our Lady of the Assassins is an urban novel, set in Medellín. The characters travel throughout the city, from the slums to the more central spaces of the city. There is not a frontier to limit their wandering within the city, bringing behind them violence.

Medellín has been a recurrent setting for different works of literature and studies in Colombia since the beginning of its Industrial Revolution at the end of the 19th century with authors like Tomás Carrasquilla, León de Greiff, Fernando González, León de Greiff and Porfirio Barba Jacob, to the writers, journalists and film directors of the second half of the 20th century like Gonzalo Arango, Alonso Salazar, Víctor Gaviria and Fernando Vallejo. Through them, we can trace the development of a small town to an industrial city and the social crisis that surrounded the city at the end of the century.

In the novel, Vallejo sees two cities: that peaceful center that he remembers that he misses through Fernando (who is almost him) and the city of Alexis, the violent place he is seeing through the eyes and actions of the boy:

"The comunas, when I was born, did not exist... I found them in full massacre when I was back, flowered and weigh on the city as its unfortunate destiny. Barrios and barrios of slums gathered one upon one in the slopes of the mountains, thundering each other with their music, poisoned of love for the neighbor, competing the longing of kill with a reproduction fury... in the moment that I write, this conflict is not yet resolved: they continue killing and born... but let's continue walking up: while upper on the mountain better, more misery.

— La virgen de los sicarios, Vallejo, Ed. Alfaro, 1994, p. 33.

== Characters ==
The main characters are three: Fernando, Alexis and Wilmar.

- Fernando: He is a mature homosexual writer who has been abroad for 30 years. He returns to his city and looks for a young man to travel through the city. They introduce Alexis to him at a party and, with him, he will know all the changes to his city.
- Alexis: A 16-year-old teenager. He lives in Barrio Santo Domingo Savio. He belongs to a gang of sicarios that is at war with another gang from Barrio La Francia, in the same North-East districts of Medellín. He began a relationship with Fernando that is not only for sexual purposes but also to travel the city and share both their worlds. Alexis explained to him the world of sicarios, while the boy listens to his nostalgic remembrances. In one of their travels, two boys on a motorbike kill Alexis. In a certain way, Fernando is responsible because Alexis' gun is not at hand because of Fernando's suicide attempts. After the death of Alexis, Fernando gives some money to his mother.
- Wilmar: Another boy from the comunas, this time Barrio La Francia. He is also a sicario and belongs to a gang at war with Barrio Santo Domingo Savio gang. Fernando likes him because the boy bears a curious resemblance to Alexis, not only physically but also in his behavior. They continue to travel throughout the city, but Fernando is looking for Alexis' assassin. When a friend tells Fernando that Wilmar is the one who killed Alexis, Fernando wants to kill him. However, Fernando restrains himself when he learns that Alexis started the violence by killing Wilmar's brother. Fernando proposes to Wilmar that they leave the country together. The boy wants to say goodbye to his mother and offers her some gifts, but when he goes, he is also murdered. Fernando ends up alone in a city where love is not possible.
