= Buitrago (surname) =

Buitrago is a surname. Notable people with the surname include:

- Carlos Buitrago (born 1991), Nicaraguan boxer
- Daniel Buitrago (born 1991), Colombian football player
- Fanny Buitrago (born 1943), Colombian fiction writer and playwright
- Guillermo Buitrago (1920–1949), Colombian composer and songwriter
- Hernando Buitrago (born 1970), Colombian football referee
- Ricardo Buitrago (born 1985), Panamanian football player
- Roberto Buitrago (1937–2025), Colombian road racing cyclist
- Santiago Buitrago (born 1999), Colombian road racing cyclist
