= El Santo Cachón =

Song by Los Embajadores Vallenatos
- Released: 1994
- Genre: Vallenato
- Songwriter: Romualdo Brito

"El Santo Cachón" is a vallenato song written by Romualdo Brito and recorded in 1994 by Los Embajadores Vallenatos. The song's lyrics concern infidelities committed in Barranquilla's Sagrado Corazón park. On its release, the song was met with legal actions alleging that the song violated morals and good customs. They asked a judge to prohibit it from playing on radio stations and nightclubs, but such prohibitions were not granted. Brito stated in later years that he regretted writing the song. It was selected by Hip Latina in 2017 as one of the "13 Old School Songs Every Colombian Grew Up Listening To"; the publication described the song as "fun, hilarious, and great to dance to." In 2018, a cover of the song was released by Silvestre Dangond. The song has also been featured in two motion pictures: La Virgen de los sicarios (2000) y Nebraska (2013).
