= Judo at the 2010 South American Games – Men's katame-no-kata =

The Men's Katame No Kata event at the 2010 South American Games was held at 8:00 on March 19.

== Medalists ==
Gold	Silver	Bronze
Rioiti Uchida; Luis Santos; Brazil	Glatenferd Escobar; Luis Gabriel Cuartas; Colombia	Medardo Duarte; Javier Rivero; Venezuela; Ariel Sorati; Juan Pablo Vital; Argentina

== Results ==
Rank	Athletes	Result
1st place, gold medalist(s)	Brazil; Rioiti Uchida; Luis Santos	145
2nd place, silver medalist(s)	Colombia; Glatenferd Escobar; Luis Gabriel Cuartas	140
3rd place, bronze medalist(s)	Venezuela; Medardo Duarte; Javier Rivero	131
3rd place, bronze medalist(s)	Argentina; Ariel Sorati; Juan Pablo Vital	118
5	Paraguay; Francisco Cardozo; Mauricio Sforza	96
