= William Ospina =

Colombian poet (born 1954)

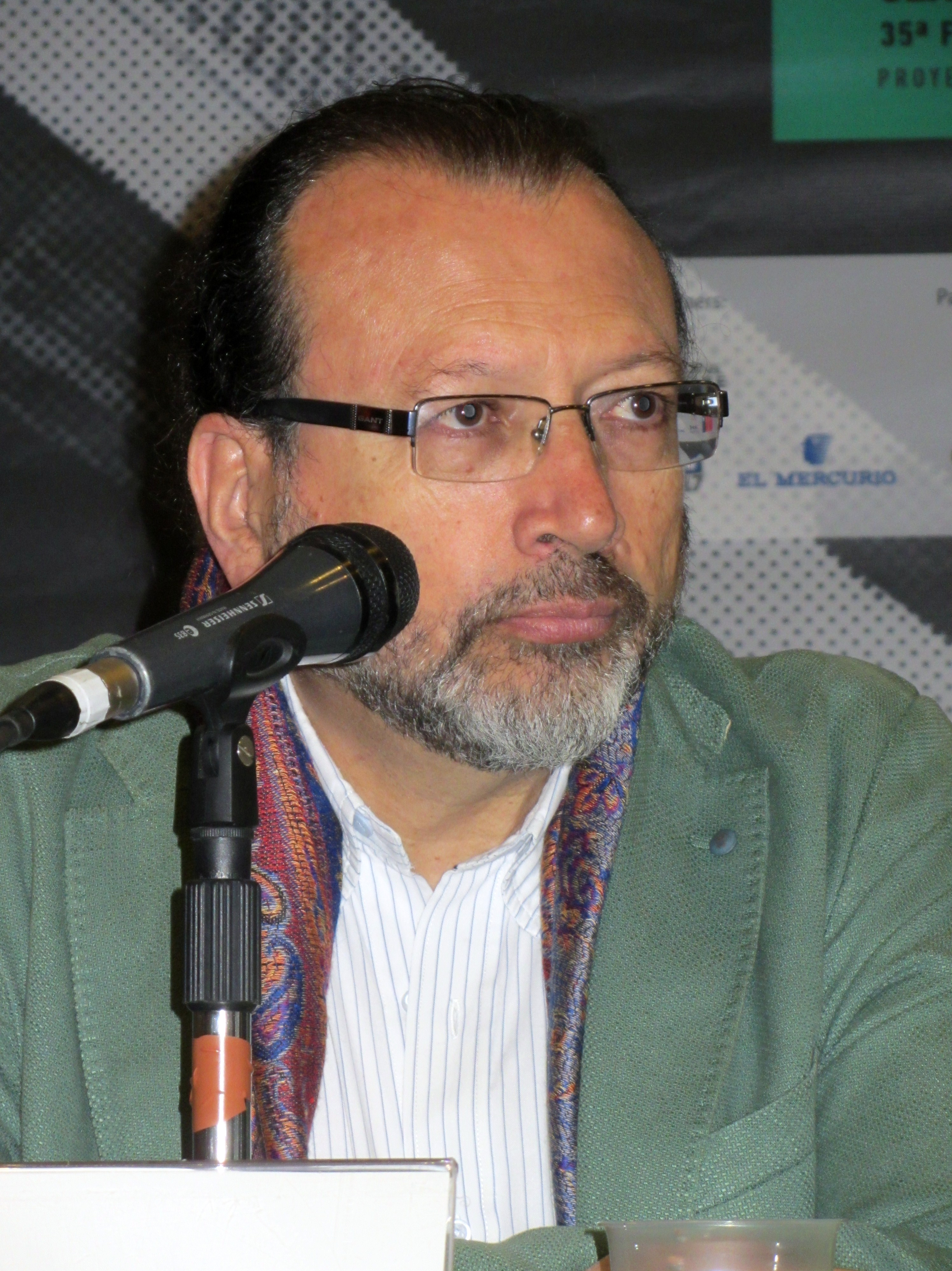
- Born: March 2, 1954 (age 72); Herveo, Tolima
- Occupation: Writer
- Writing career
- Notable awards: -Premio Nacional de Ensayo 1982 -Premio Nacional de Poesía 1992 -Premio Casa de las Américas, Premio de Ensayo Ezequiel Martínez Estrada, 2003 -Premio Rómulo Gallegos 2009

William Ospina (born 2 March 1954) is a Colombian poet, essayist and novelist. He was born in Herveo, Tolima. He won the Romulo Gallegos Prize for his novel El país de la canela, part of a trilogy about the invasion and conquest of South America.

== Life ==
William Ospina was born in Herveo, Tolima, on 2 March 1954, but his family had to move around southern Colombia quite often due to the violence of the time. His father, Luis Ospina, a nurse and musician, nurtured in his son a strong passion for Colombian culture: "We had no books and home, but we had all the songs".

He grew up in Cali where he studied law and political sciences at Santiago de Cali University. He quit his job and decided to devote himself to literature. He lived in Paris from 1979 to 1981. When he returned to Colombia, he became Sunday news editor for La Prensa newspaper in Bogotá (1988–1989). He has written essays about Lord Byron, Edgar Allan Poe, Leo Tolstoy, Charles Dickens, Emily Dickinson, One Thousand and One Nights, Alfonso Reyes, Estanislao Zuleta, and William Shakespeare.

== Literary themes ==
=== Invasion and colonization of Latin America ===
Ospina has written several essays and articles regarding this period, establishing how valuable the understanding of these events is for the comprehension of Latin-American identity, as well as its social, cultural, and political challenges.

In 2005, Ospina began a trilogy of semi-historical novels about this time period:

The first book, Ursúa, depicts the life of the young conquistador Pedro de Ursúa who was initially loyal to the law and justice of the Spanish crown, but as he explores the new world, he is taken by greed and becomes a ferocious warrior who kills for power and gold. Most of the historical events narrated in these novels are inspired by the 16th-century poems of Juan de Castellanos.

The second book, El país de la canela, tells of Francisco de Orellana's first trip along the Amazon River and the conquests of Francisco Pizarro. This novel was awarded the Rómulo Gallegos Prize in 2009.

The third book, La serpiente sin ojos, narrates Ursúa's attempt to repeat Orellana's trip to discover the country of the Amazons. The book also recounts the crimes of Lope de Aguirre.

=== Romanticism ===
In 2015, Ospina published his novel El Verano que nunca llegó, where he depicts his literary investigation into the history of Villa Doidati and the events that in 1816 gave birth to the two famous literary works Frankenstein and The Vampyre. The story travels back and forth in time, describing Percy Bysshe Shelley, Lord Byron and Mary Shelly's life events and Ospina's visit to sites connected to these characters.

This book differs from his previous works, focused on Latin American history, to the description of global historical events with an emphasis on European romanticism and its influence in the present day. Ospina ponders how the past and present intertwine and how places seem to be meant to be in some people's lives.

== Views ==
He has openly criticized the ineffectiveness of the Colombian government in protecting its people and caring for their necessities. He also recriminates the Colombian population for its apathy and lack of strong demands on their government. He has supported the Colombian peace process and on April 9, 2013, during a national march of over a million people, the Colombian congresswoman Piedad Córdoba read a prayer named Oración por la paz written by Ospina.

He proposes education as a solution for many societal problems, understanding education not only as school-related, but as the example that society and media sets for children. He states that youth must feel empowered enough to take part in their present and be able to change the future of a nation.

According to Colombian newspaper El Universal, Ospina has dedicated his life to the art of thinking. His work invites people to question their history, politics, social interactions and the handling of natural resources.

== Cultural contribution ==
He has been praised by icons of Latin American literature. In 1996, Mario Vargas Llosa wrote a two-page article in the newspaper El País where he analyzes the collection of essays Es tarde para el hombre. He judges Ospina's work as bewitching and of high quality, although Vargas Llosa does not agree with his ideas; he describes the author as a skilled manufacturer of sociological fictions that transfer to a mythical past. In 2005, Gabriel García Márquez defined Ospina's first novel as "the best book of the year", and Fernando Vallejo stated that the prose used in Ursúa has no competitor in the Spanish language.

His work has been used by universities and academic groups to analyze political history of Colombia and other countries. In 2018, the Spanish newspaper El Mundo published an article on the divisions within the country because of Catalonia; the article proposes Ospina's idea of a united nation in which all differences are accepted as a solution to the Spanish conflict.

Ospina has represented Colombia in international literary events, including Panama's book fair in 2017 and the Dominican Republic's book fair in 2019. The magazine Arcadia included his novel El año del verano que nunca llegó among the recommended books to read in the Bogota Book Fair of 2015.

== Works ==
=== Poetry ===
- Hilo de arena (1986)
- El país del viento (1992, National Poetry Prize, Colcultura)
- ¿Con quién habla Virginia caminando hacia el agua? (1995)
- África (1999)
- La tienda de la esquina
- Poesía 1974–2004 (2007)

=== Essays ===
- Aurelio Arturo (1991)
- Es tarde para el hombre (1994)
- Esos extraños prófugos de Occidente (1994)
- Los dones y los méritos (1995)
- Un álgebra embrujada (1996)
- ¿Dónde está la franja amarilla? (1997)
- Las auroras de sangre (1999)
- Los nuevos centros de la esfera (2001. Ezequiel Martínez Estrada Essay Prize from Casa de las Américas, Havana, 2003)
- Los Románticos y el futuro
- Las trampas del progreso (2000)
- La decadencia de los dragones (2002)
- Lo que le falta a Colombia (2002)
- América mestiza (2004)
- La escuela de la noche (2008)
- La herida en la piel de la diosa
- En busca de Bolívar (2010)
- La lámpara maravillosa (2012)
- Pa que se acabe la vaina (2013)

=== Novels ===
- Ursúa (2005, Alfaguara)
- El país de la canela (2008, ed. La otra orilla, Grupo Editorial Norma), Rómulo Gallegos Prize
- La serpiente sin ojos (2012, Mondadori Colombia)
- El año del verano que nunca llegó (2015, Random House)
- Guayacanal (2019, Random House)
