= Nadaism =

Colombian counterculture movement

Nadaism (Spanish: Nadaísmo, meaning "Nothing-ism" in English) was a Colombian artistic and philosophical counterculture movement active from 1958. Founded by writer Gonzalo Arango, in Medellìn, Antioquia, the movement was influenced by nihilism, surrealism, dadaism, existentialism, and the works of Colombian writer and philosopher Fernando González Ochoa.

Nadaism represented a Colombian expression of the avant-garde movements in the literature and poetry during the 1950s, 60s,70s, 80s, 90s, until our days, such as the french symbolists and decadents, the dadaists and existencialists. The movement was largely anti-establishment and inspired works of literature, music, and film exploring very different universal themes.

The term nadaísmo is a portmanteau of the Spanish word "nada" (meaning nothing) and "Dadaism" (Spanish: Dadaísmo). Nadaísmo has sometimes been described as "Colombian dadaism", a "Colombian existencialism or Colombian Beat Generation", or "Colombian Futurism".

== History ==
The violent events in Colombia during the 1940s and 1950s, such as La Violencia and the military government of Gustavo Rojas Pinilla, alongside rapid urban expansion, significantly influenced the formation of the Nadaísta (Nothing-ist) movement. Arango initially supported General Pinilla's rise to power, joining the Movimiento Amplio Nacional (Broad National Movement), which consisted of artists and young intellectuals who supported the dictator as an alternative to traditional bipartidist politics.. During this period, Arango worked as a journalist. However, the combined opposition of Conservative and Liberal party leaders led to Rojas Pinilla's fall on May 10, 1957. While the former dictator was exiled in Spain, Gonzalo Arango eventually moved to Chocó, Colombia.

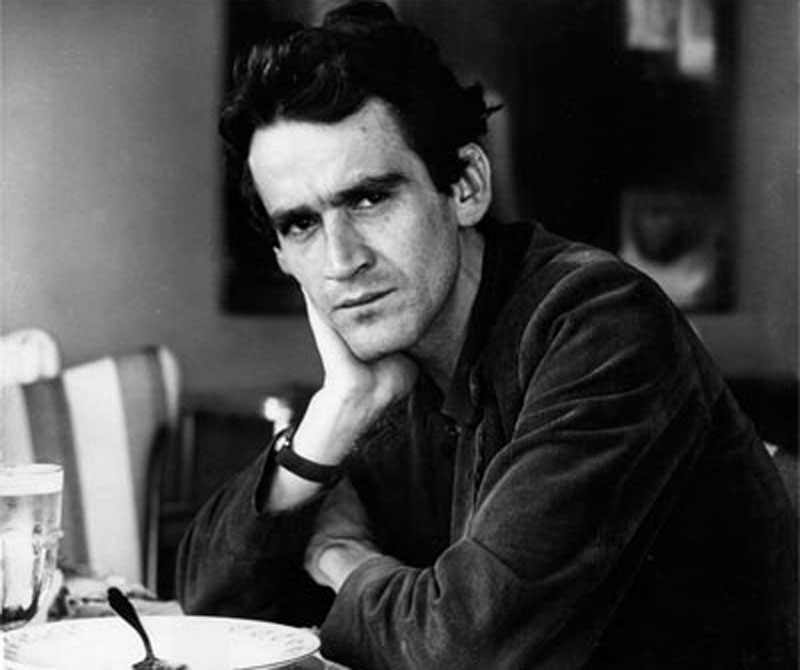
Gonzalo Arango, creator of the Nadaist movement

Arango initiated the Nadaist movement in 1958 with the publication of his 42-page "Nadaism Manifesto," signed "gonzaloarango," in the Medellín magazine Amistad (meaning "Friendship"). Arango and other writers subsequently explored their disillusionment with the military government they had once supported.

Among the first to join the movement were Eduardo Escobar, Darío Lemos, Alberto Escobar, Elmo Valencia, and Amilcar Osorio. As an inaugural act in 1958, they publicly burned works of Colombian literature in the Plazuela de San Ignacio in Medellín, symbolizing their rejection of traditional Colombian literary canons. One of the burned books was Arango's first work, "After the Man".

The movement started to dissolv with the deaths of its principal founding members. Toward the end of his life, Arango himself began to distance himself from some of the core tenets held by other Nadaist members.Eduardo Escobar continued writing poetry and chronics until 2024.

== Prominent figures ==
Notable authors, painters, poets, artists, and musicians associated with this movement include:

- Gonzalo Arango
- Jaime Jaramillo Escobar, also known as "X-504"
- Fanny Buitrago
- Eduardo Escobar
- Amílcar Osorio, also known as "Amilkar-U"
- Dukardo Hinestrosa
- Hernan Nicholls
- Darío Lemos
- Elmo Valencia
- Alberto Escobar Ángel
- Fernando Lalinde
- Fernando González Ochoa
- Mario Rivero

Associated rock bands included Los Speakers, The Young Beats, and Los Yetis.

== Notable works ==
- From Nothing to Nadaism (Spanish: De la nada al nadaísmo) (1963), Gonzalo Arango, a poetry anthology
- Obra Negra (1974), Gonzalo Arango.
- Poemas urbanos (1966), Mario Rivero
- El hostigante verano de los dioses, Fanny Buitrago
- Prosa Incompleta, Eduardo Escobar.
- Correspondencia violada, Eduardo Escobar.
- Fuga canónica, Eduardo Escobar.
- Gonzalo Arango, Eduardo Escobar.
- Cuando nada concuerda, Eduardo Escobar.
- Mis primeros setenta años y otros días, Eduardo Escobar.
- Cabos sueltos, Eduardo Escobar.
- Insistencia en el error, Eduardo Escobar.
- Nadaismo a Go-Go!, Los Yetis, a CD

== See also ==
- Stone and Sky
- Colombian literature
- Latin American Boom
