= Hugo Achugar =

Uruguayan poet, essayist, and researcher

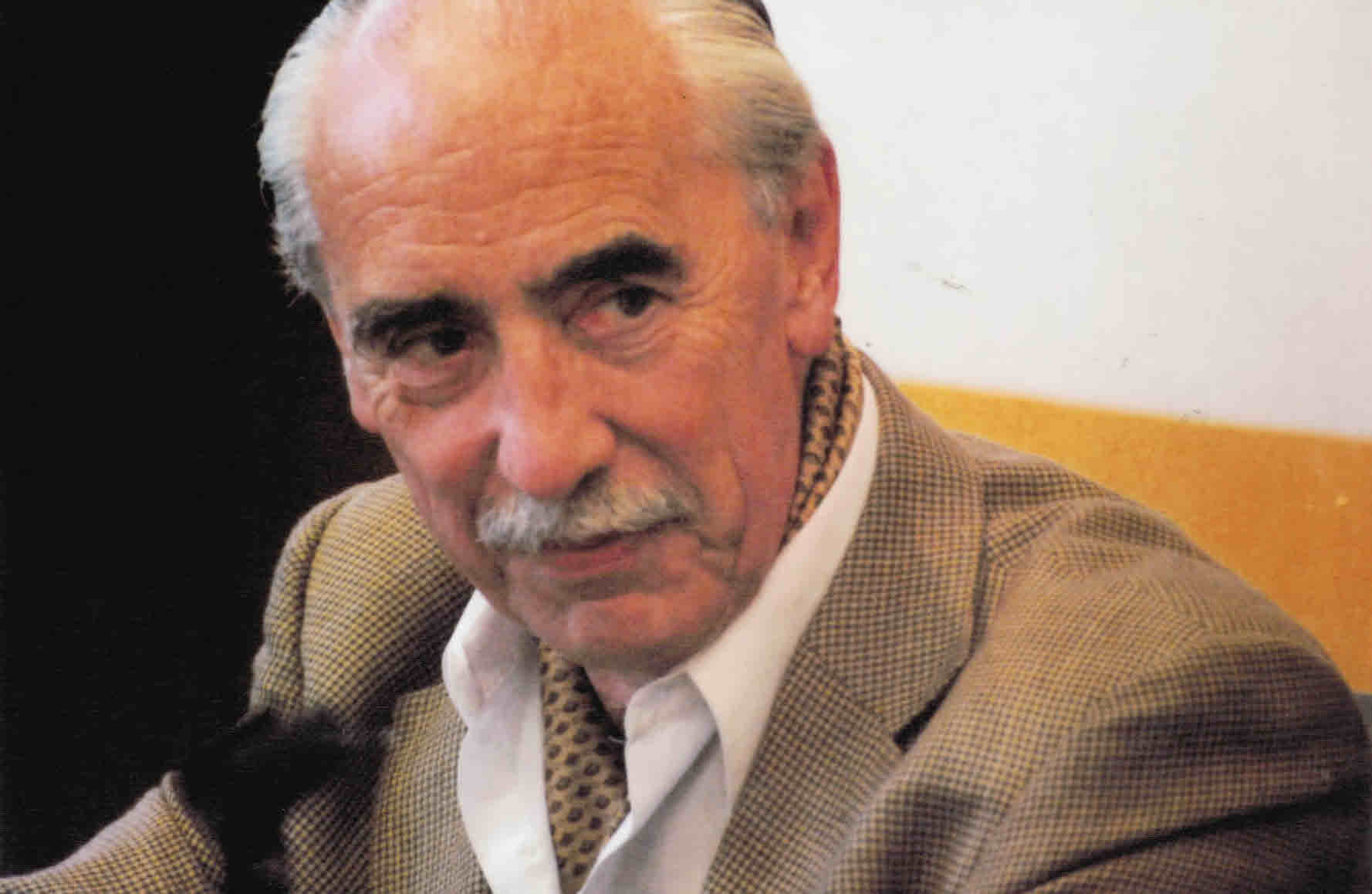
- Hugo Achugar in 2013.
- Born: Hugo Achugar Ferrari; 23 January 1944 (age 82); Montevideo, Uruguay
- Education: Instituto de Profesores Artigas
- Occupations: professor, writer, researcher
- Awards: Premio Bartolomé Hidalgo

Hugo Achugar (born 1944 in Montevideo) is a professor emeritus at the University of Miami and a Uruguayan poet, essayist, and researcher.

== Biography ==
Achugar graduated from the Artigas Institute for Teachers (Instituto de Profesores Artigas) with a degree in literature and taught secondary education in Uruguay until he was dismissed by the Uruguayan dictatorship. He then relocated to Caracas, where he worked as a researcher for the Rómulo Gallegos Center for Latin American Studies.

He has held professorships in Venezuela, the United States, and Uruguay. He currently teaches cultural policies at University of the Republic in Uruguay.

== Publications ==
=== Poetry ===
- El derrumbe (1968)
- Con bigote triste (1971)
- Mi país / mi casa (1973)
- Textos para decir María (1976)
- Seis mariposas tropicales (1986)
- Las mariposas tropicales (1987)
- Todo lo que es sólido se disuelve en el aire (1989)
- Orfeo en el salón de la memoria (1991)
- El cuerpo del Bautista (1996)
- Hueso quevrado (2006)
- "Incorrección" (2012)
- "Los pasados del presente" (2016)
- "Demoliciones" (2019)

=== Criticism ===
- Ideologías y estructuras narratives en José Donoso (1950-1970) (1979)
- Poesía y sociedad (Uruguay, 1880-1911) (1986)
- La balsa de la Medusa (1992)
- La biblioteca en ruinas: reflexiones culturales desde la periferia (1994)
- Planetas sin boca.Escritos efímeros sobre arte, cultura, y literature (2004)
- "Piedra, papel o tijera. Sobre cultura y literatura en América Latina". (2020)

=== Narrative ===
- Cañas de la India (1995) (Con el heterónimo Juana Caballero)
- Falsas memorias: Blanca Luz Brum (2000)

=== Discourses of the Self ===
- Habla el Huérfano (2019)
