= Eduardo Lalo =

Puerto Rican novelist (born 1960)

- Born: Eduardo Rodriguez
- Education: Columbia University University of Paris III
- Occupations: Novelist; essayist; professor
- Writing career
- Genre: Puerto Rican literature Caribbean literature
- Notable work: Simone (2015)
- Notable awards: Romulo Gallegos Prize

Eduardo Lalo (born 1960) is a Puerto Rican novelist, best known for his novel Simone, who won the Rómulo Gallegos Prize.

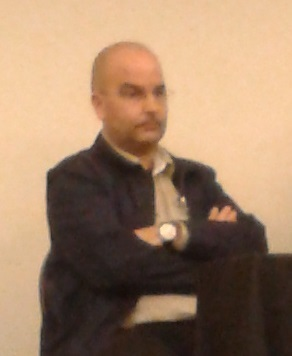
Eduardo Lalo

== Biography ==
Although born in Cuba, he identifies himself as Puerto Rican and is involved in the island's affairs. He lives in San Juan, Puerto Rico since the age of two. He studied at the Colegio San Ignacio de Loyola, where he graduated in 1977. He then went on to study at Columbia University and later at the University of Paris III: Sorbonne Nouvelle.

Lalo's works are difficult to define generically. His books are hybrids of essay and fiction, as demonstrated in his first book, En el Burger King de la calle San Francisco (In the San Francisco Street Burger King), published in 1986. Since then he has insisted on mixing art, essay and fiction in his publications. As he has stated: "First of all, I'm a writer. I started to draw late, at age 21, when I had just finished studying in New York and visited museums and galleries. I went to live in Paris and without any training I requested admissions to a school of fine arts."

His international recognition came in 2013, when he won the Rómulo Gallegos Prize for his novel Simone, an English-language translation of which was published in 2015 by the University of Chicago Press. Also in 2013, he led the Puerto Rican delegation to the XVIII International Book Fair in Lima, where Puerto Rico was the guest of honor.

He is a professor at the Río Piedras campus of the University of Puerto Rico, and publishes columns of literary criticism is publications such as 80 Grados. He has directed two medium-length films: donde (Where) and La ciudad perdida (The Lost City). In addition, he has shown his work as a photographer in more than a dozen exhibits.

== Works ==
- En el Burger King de la calle San Francisco, with eight drawings by the author; Ediciones Astrolabio, San Juan (Puerto Rico), 1986.
- Libro de textos, two monologues, fourteen stories and several poems; Instituto de Cultura Puertorriqueña, San Juan, 1992.
- Ciudades e islas, Publicaciones Yuquiyú, San Juan, 1995.
- La isla silente, reedition of three earlier books; Isla Negra Editores, San Juan, 2002.
- Los pies de San Juan, photographic essay; Centro de Investigación y Política Pública, Fundación Biblioteca Rafael Hernández Colón, 2002.
- La inutilidad, novel, Ediciones Callejón, San Juan, 2004.
- donde, hybrid book: essay and photography Editorial Tal Cual, San Juan, 2005.
- San Juan de Puerto Rico, Institució Alfons el Magnànim, colección Debats 88, Valencia, 2005.
- Leyendas sobre secretos: La hija del verdugo; La mancha de sangre, Puerto Rican legends adapted by Lalo and illustrated by Walter Gastaldo; Alfaguara Infantil y Juvenil, Guaynabo, 2005.
- Los países invisibles, essay, Editorial Tal Cual, San Juan, 2008.
- El deseo del lápiz: castigo, urbanismo, escritura, essay, Editorial Tal Cual, San Juan, 2010.
- Simone, novel, Ediciones Corregidor, Buenos Aires, 2012.
- Simone, novel in English-language translation, The University of Chicago Press, Chicago and London, 2015.
