= Rómulo Gallegos Prize =

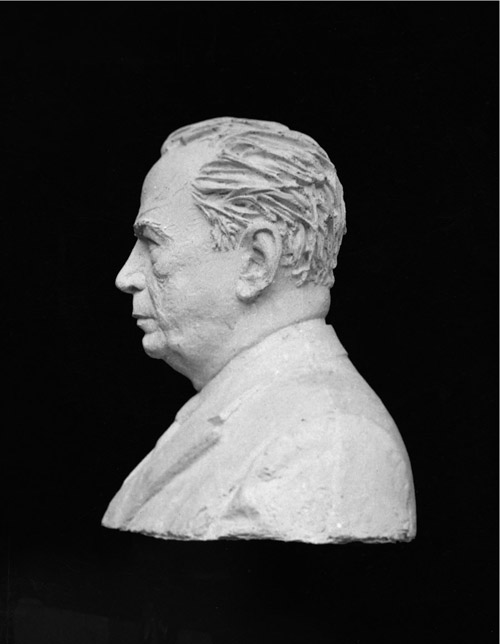
- Location: Caracas
- Country: Venezuela
- Presented by: CELARG
- First award: 1967
- Website: celarg.org.ve

The Rómulo Gallegos International Novel Prize (Spanish: Premio internacional de novela Rómulo Gallegos) was created on 6 August 1964 by a presidential decree enacted by Venezuelan president Raúl Leoni, in honor of the Venezuelan writer and President Rómulo Gallegos, the author of Doña Bárbara.

The declared purpose of the prize is to "perpetuate and honor the work of the eminent novelist and also to stimulate the creative activity of Spanish language writers".

It is awarded by the government of Venezuela, through the offices of the Rómulo Gallegos Center for Latin American Studies (CELARG). The first prize was given in 1967. It was awarded every five years until 1987, when it became a biennial award.

The award includes a cash prize of €100,000 making it among the richest literary prizes in the world.

== Award winners ==
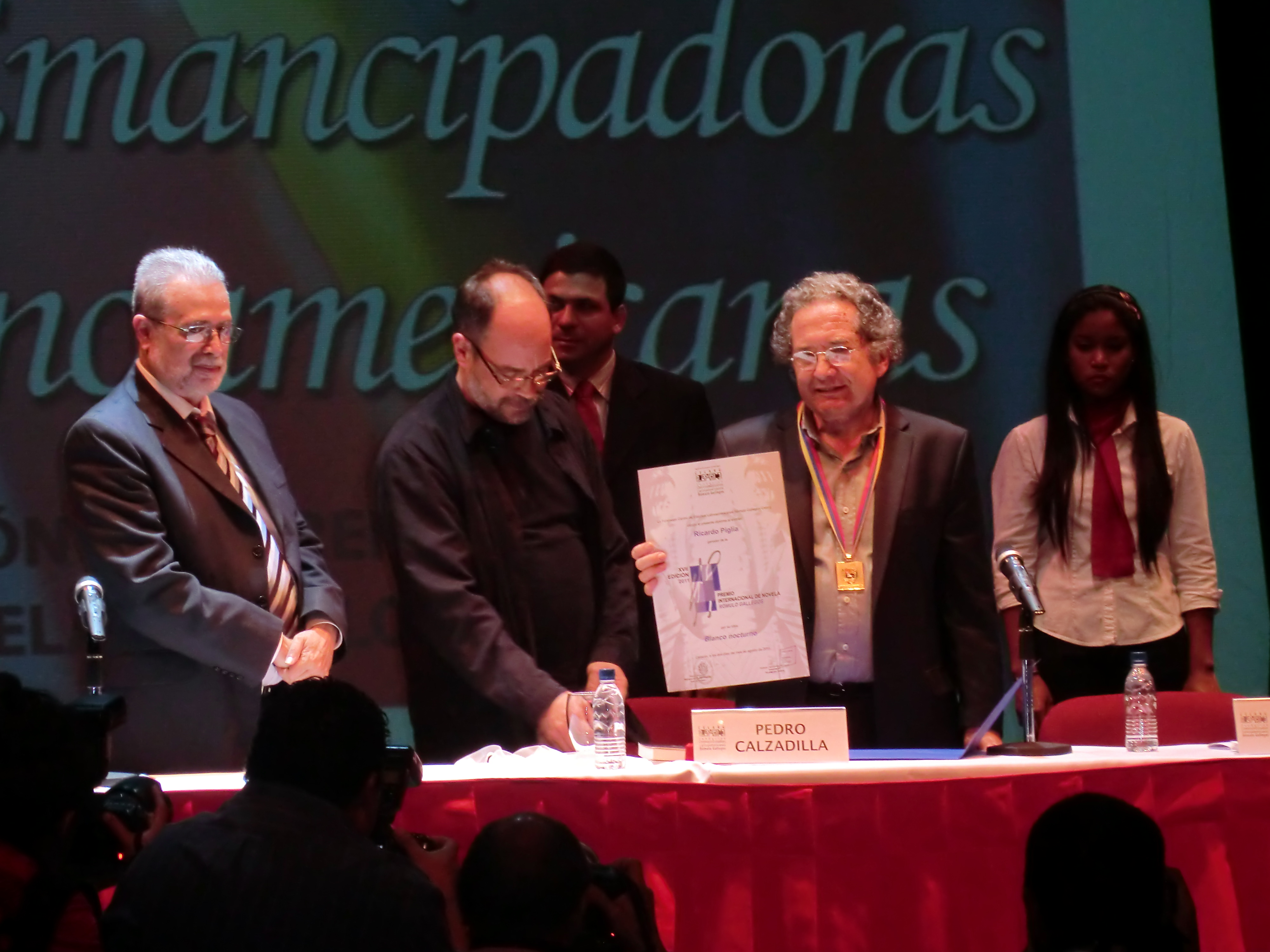
2011 edition of the Rómulo Gallegos Prize

- 1967: La casa verde, by Mario Vargas Llosa of Peru (English translation: The Green House)
- 1972: Cien años de soledad, by Gabriel García Márquez of Colombia (English translation: One Hundred Years of Solitude)
- 1977: Terra nostra, by Carlos Fuentes of Mexico (translated as Terra Nostra)
- 1982: Palinuro de México, by Fernando del Paso of Mexico
- 1987: Los perros del paraíso, by Abel Posse of Argentina
- 1989: La casa de las dos palmas, by Manuel Mejía Vallejo of Colombia
- 1991: La visita en el tiempo, by Arturo Uslar Pietri of Venezuela
- 1993: Santo oficio de la memoria, by Mempo Giardinelli of Argentina
- 1995: Mañana en la batalla piensa en mí, by Javier Marías of Spain (English translation: Tomorrow in the Battle Think On Me)
- 1997: Mal de amores, by Ángeles Mastretta of Mexico (English translation: Lovesick)
- 1999: Los detectives salvajes, by Roberto Bolaño of Chile (English translation: The Savage Detectives)
- 2001: El viaje vertical, by Enrique Vila-Matas of Spain
- 2003: El desbarrancadero, by Fernando Vallejo of Colombia
- 2005: El vano ayer, by Isaac Rosa Camacho of Spain
- 2007: El tren pasa primero, by Elena Poniatowska of Mexico
- 2009: El País de la Canela, by William Ospina of Colombia
- 2011: Blanco nocturno, by Ricardo Piglia of Argentina (English translation: Target in the Night)
- 2013: Simone, by Eduardo Lalo of Puerto Rico (English translation: Simone: A Novel)
- 2015: Tríptico de la Infamia, by Pablo Montoya of Colombia
- 2020: El país del diablo, by Perla Suez of Argentina
- 2025: El simulacro de los espejos, by Vicente Battista of Argentina
