= The Squad (2011 film) =

2011 film

- Theatrical release poster
- Directed by: Jaime Osorio Marquez
- Written by: Tania Cardenas; Jaime Osorio Marquez
- Produced by: Federico Durán
- Starring: Juan David Restrepo
- Cinematography: Alejandro Moreno
- Edited by: Felipe Guerrero; Sebastián Hernández
- Release date: 7 October 2011
- Running time: 100 minutes
- Country: Colombia
- Language: Spanish

The Squad (Spanish: El Páramo) is a 2011 Colombian psychological thriller film written by Tania Cardenas and Jaime Osorio Marquez and directed by Marquez in his directorial debut. The film was released in Colombia on 7 October 2011. It follows a squad of soldiers that are sent to investigate a mountain military base.

After a secret military base ceases all communications, an anti-guerrilla commando unit is sent to the mountainous location to discover what exactly happened. The squad expects to discover that the base was attacked and taken over by guerrilla units, but instead find only a lone woman (Daniela Catz) wrapped in chains.

== Plot ==
A team of anti-guerilla commandos led by an experienced sergeant and commanded by a green lieutenant are sent to secure the approach to a mountain base amid towering radio masts. When they are in position they are told to wait for their backup which has been delayed by enemy action en route. One of the soldiers, Arango, is impatient to get into the base and after arguing with the lieutenant, makes a dash for the base. The radio operator, Parra, tries to stop him, but steps on a mine which shatters his leg and destroys the primary radio. The sergeant insists they must now enter the base to use the medical facilities in order to save the critically injured Parra.

Inside the base, the squad finds only a few bodies but bloodstains and destroyed rooms everywhere. The base radios have been destroyed, and the squad personal radios are only short range, so they cannot contact their backup. The sergeant discovers that the base supplies are untouched, indicating that this was not a guerrilla raid.

Exploring the base, their local guide (Fiquitiva, nicknamed "Indian") discovers a room filled with fetishes and prayers scrawled on the walls. He calls the others, but is mocked for his superstition. Later, he returns and discovers that the wall of the room has been recently built and something is trapped behind it. The lieutenant order the wall broken down, and they find, trapped inside, a bound woman who cannot, or will not, talk to them. Arango, whose brother was stationed on the base, tries to question her but gets nowhere. The sergeant begins beating her but is stopped by the lieutenant. The lieutenant calls for the medic and puts one of the other soldiers, Ponce, on guard with orders that no one is to see the prisoner without permission. Ponce starts to offer the woman some food, but is dragged away by the medic, who accuses Ponce of being "just like the rest" and that he is disgusted by them all.

The squad corporal, Cortez, discovers a bundle of papers under a body and begins to read them as night falls. Ponce, guarding the prisoner, is bullied into leaving by the sergeant, who then enters the room with the prisoner. Reading the papers Cortez discovers that the woman was picked up on suspicion of being a guerilla spy and interrogated, but refused to talk. At the same time when she was taken prisoner, one of the base soldiers became ill and insisted the woman had placed a curse upon him. The base soldiers became increasingly convinced the woman was a witch and eventually rioted, attempting to cut out her tongue. The log ends without explaining what happens next, only that "the captain had completely lost control of the men", at least one of whom had killed another soldier, and the final scrawled words in the log insist that they "must kill the witch".

Ponce has a flashback dream to hazy memories of an event before the start of the mission, but is suddenly awoken by shouting from his radio to return to the guard post. Inside, they discover that the sergeant has been killed and the woman has escaped. They spread out looking for her and "Indian" falls down a gully, landing in a mass grave of base soldiers. Indian confronts the lieutenant, accusing him of bringing doom on them all by releasing the "witch". An argument between Arango and Parra's best friend is interrupted when the perimeter noisemakers are tripped at one of the lookout points. The mist means that they cannot see anything, but corporal Cortez defies the lieutenant to lead the men out to attempt to kill the "guerrilla bitch".

Out in the mist, the men begin shooting at fast moving shapes that whip past them, but only succeed in shooting Arango in the crossfire, killing him. The lieutenant, furious at Arango's death and the squad for disobeying his orders, attempts to relieve Parra's friend of his weapon, but is stopped by the corporal, who accuses him of knowing about the witch from the logbook all along. The lieutenant denies knowing anything and argues that it is Cortez's fault for leading the men out into the mist, but the men side with the corporal and tie up the lieutenant in the radio room.

Indian, who has been furiously scratching since falling in the pit, goes to the medic and demands treatment for "the plague" he has caught from the dead bodies. The medic throws him out, distraught because Parra has gangrene and is dying. Ponce tries to talk to Cortez, insisting the situation has gone well beyond their control, but the corporal insists he will get all of them out safe. Indian steals gasoline from the base generator to burn the corpse pit, then strips off his clothes. Disgusted, the corporal kicks him back toward the pit then locks him out of the base.

In a last effort to save his life, the remaining team try to amputate Parra's leg, but he dies shortly after the operation. Angry, and with no reason to remain with his patient, the medic prepares to leave. The corporal refuses to let him, as whoever killed the sergeant is still out there. In a rage, the medic reveals that he killed the sergeant rather than let him rape and murder another woman, referencing the events from Ponce's flashback. In retaliation, Cortez beats the medic to death in front of the horrified Ponce. A scream from outside prompts Ponce and Parra's friend to try and rescue Indian, but Indian is trying to cut off his "contaminated" skin and stabs Parra's friend to death when found (Indian is not seen again after this). Ponce tries to persuade Cortez to leave, but the corporal is now totally insane and Ponce is forced to kill him in self-defense.

Ponce climbs slowly down the mountain, suffering flashbacks to the events before the mission - the massacre of an entire village of guerrilla sympathisers. He arrives at the point where the film started in a disconnected daze, when the "witch" appears behind him and screams.

== Cast ==
- Juan David Restrepo as Ramos
- Andrés Castañeda as Sargento
- Mauricio Navas as Teniente
- Mateo Stevel as Parra
- Daniela Catz as Mujer
- Nelson Camayo as Fiquitiva
- Andres Torres as Arango
- Juan Pablo Barragan as Ponce
- Julio César Valencia as Robledo
- Alejandro Aguilar as Cortez

== Reception ==
Critical reception for The Squad has been mixed. Geeks of Doom wrote "For some, The Squad will impress with its tense, psychological drama. For others, it will fail to deliver on its interesting premise. It’s a polished, well-crafted thriller, but it just isn’t all that thrilling to me. Regardless, Marquez’s feature film debut signifies a promising future for the Colombian filmmaker." Bloody Disgusting panned the film overall, stating that the idea had promise and that they would look for future films by Jaime Osorio Marquez’, but that the film did not live up to its full potential and that some ideas, specifically the "witch" character, could have been better utilized.
