= Juan David Restrepo =

- Born: Juan David Restrepo Zapata; 10 December 1979 (age 45); Medellín, Colombia
- Occupation: Actor
- Years active: 2000–present
- Spouse: Liliana Vanegas
- Children: 1 daughter

Juan David Restrepo (born 10 December 1979 in Medellín, Colombia) is a Colombian television, theatre and film actor and film director. Restrepo also teaches modeling techniques, develops scripts, produces and directs short films.

== Biography ==
Restrepo was first noticed by a scout from International Models and he appeared in many adverts, most notably for Diesel, Unlimited and Francois Girbaud, including a featured spread in Numéro. He was subsequently offered his first film role in Our Lady of the Assassins. He then attended German Jaramillo's Free Theatre School on full scholarship and appeared in many theatre productions, television programmes and films. He directed and starred in the film 'El Coma' in 2011.

As a sportsman he has also played in the 2001 Copa Merconorte international football competition.

He and his wife Liliana Vanegas have one daughter, Luna.

== Filmography ==
- 2012 The Squad -Ramos
- 2011 En Coma -Omar, also Director
- 2006 El Don (Part 1 of Jose Ramon Novoa's Pablo Escobar trilogy) - Kike
- 2005 Rosario Tijeras -Morsa
- 2004 Punto y Raya - Sgt. Requena
- 2000 Our Lady of the Assassins - Wilmar

- 2002 Siguiendo el rastro - Juancho
- 2001 Historias de hombres sólo para mujeres - (2 guest appearances)
- 1999 Francisco el matématico
- 2008 [ En coma, movie]
