= Francisco Cardozo =

Venezuelan actor

Francisco Cardozo (born November 10, 1985) is a Venezuelan theater actor, playwright, director, and social media personality. He gained popularity on TikTok and Instagram by posting videos related to his experience as a gay man living in New York City and reacting to other user's videos. Francisco has been nominated by most of Hispanic theater awards in the big apple including LATA Awards, ATI Awards and the New York Latin ACE Awards. He won in two categories (Best Ensemble and Best Solo Performance) in the 2020 edition of the New York Latin ACE Awards given by the Association of Latin Entertainment Critics. In 2020 Francisco won a HOLA Award given by the Hispanic Organization of Latin Actors.

== Career ==
Francisco started his theater career in Valencia, Venezuela. He is a founding member of the theater movement Teatro Estable Valencia at the Baseball Museum of Sambil Valencia. He has a playwright diploma from the Center of Latin American Studies Romulo Gallegos (CELARG). In 2014, he moved to New York City where he has been working in the Hispanic theater circuit of the city.

== Personal life ==
Francisco is openly gay

== Awards ==
- ATI Awards 2018, Leading Actor Independent Theater, Nominated
- ATI Awards 2018, Actor in a Solo Performance, Nominated
- New York Latin ACE Awards 2018, Outstanding Actor in a Solo Performance, Nominated
- ATI Awards 2019, Best Actor in a Short Play, Nominated
- ATI Awards 2019, Best Director in a Short Play, Nominated
- ATI Awards 2019, Best Production in a Short Play, Nominated
- LATA Awards 2019, Best Playwright, Nominated
- LATA Awards 2019, Best Actor in a Short Play, Winner
- HOLA Awards 2019, Outstanding Performance by an Ensemble Cast, Winner
- ATI Awards 2020, Best Actor in a Solo Performance, Nominated
- ATI Awards 2020, Best Actor in a Short Play, Nominated
- LATA Awards 2020, Best Ensemble, Winner
- New York Latin ACE Awards 2020, Outstanding Actor in a Solo Performance, Winner
- New York Latin ACE Awards, Ensemble of the Year, Winner
