= Fernando González (writer) =

Colombian writer and philosopher (1895-1964)

Fernando González Ochoa
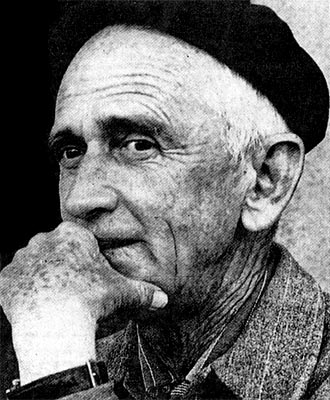
- Born: April 24, 1895; Envigado, Colombia
- Died: February 16, 1964 (aged 68); Envigado, Colombia

Philosophical work
- Era: 20th-century philosophy
- Region: Western philosophy
- School: Existentialism
- Main interests: Sociology, epistemology, history, politics, theology, economy, moral

Fernando González Ochoa (April 24, 1895 – February 16, 1964), was a Colombian writer and existentialist philosopher known as "el filósofo de Otraparte" (The Philosopher from Elsewhere). He wrote about sociology, history, art, morality, economics, epistemology and theology in a humorous, and creative style, in various genres of literature. González is considered one of the most original writers of Colombia during the 20th century. His ideas were controversial and had a great influence in the Colombian society at his time and still today. González work inspired Nadaism, a literary and cultural movement founded by Gonzalo Arango and some other writers, poets and painters that surrounded him. His Otraparte house in Envigado, is today a museum and the headquarters of the cultural foundation to preserve and promote his legacy. His house was declared a National Patrimony of Colombia in 2006.

== Biography ==
=== Context ===
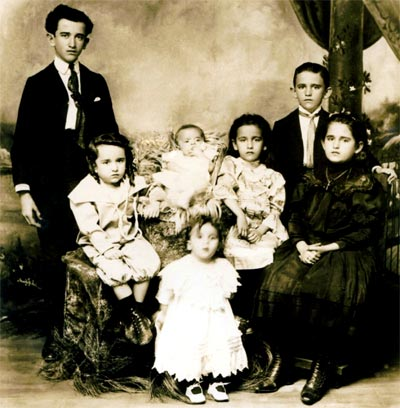
The children of Daniel and Pastora González: Alfonso, Daniel, Alberto, Graciela, Fernando (the philosopher) and Sofía. Standing up in front Jorge. A picture of 1907.

González lived during the beginning of the 20th century (1895–1964), a time of change, political turbulence and revolutions in industry. He was born seven years after the new political agreement of a more conservative constitution (1888) that gave great influence to the Catholic Church in Colombian society, especially in the education of future generations. Four years after, when he was 4 years old, the nation fell in a bloody civil war, the 1899 - 1902 Thousand Days War. The other important event that happened during his life was in 1903 when Colombia lost Panama. In 1926 the Banana massacre gave evidence of the labor problems of the different growing Colombian industries. He lived also in one of the principal trade centers of the country, the Metropolitan Area of Medellín, the first to start an Industrial Revolution in Colombia during the 1930s. González was also a witness of the emergence of Fascism in Italy when he was consul of Colombia in that country. In 1948 the killing of the presidential candidate Jorge Eliécer Gaitán opened the doors of a new political instability with El Bogotazo. All these events are reflected in the works and thoughts of Fernando González Ochoa.

=== Early life ===
Fernando González Ochoa was born in Envigado, a city in the Aburrá Valley (Antioquia State). He was the second of seven children. His parents were Daniel González and Pastora Ochoa. His father was a school teacher, the inspiration of one of his books (El Maestro de Escuela). He was expelled from the school of the Presentation of Envigado because he insulted a sister after being punished.

Something similar would happen soon after he joined the Jesuit College of Medellín, but this time because he was caught reading Shopenhauer and Nietzsche. The young González faced his teacher of philosophy, Rev. Quiroz, saying that nothing can be and can not be at the same time. He was a sophomore in high school when the Jesuits asked him to leave the school.

=== Formation ===
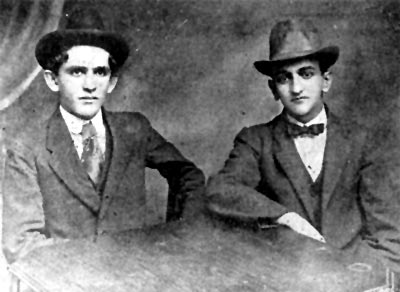
The young Fernando González at right with his friend Fernando Isaza in 1915.

In 1915 he became a member of Los Panidas, a group of sceptics, with León de Greiff, Ricardo Rendón, Félix Mejía Arango, Libardo Parra Toro, José Manuel Mora Vásquez and Eduardo Vasco, among other young writers, artists and intellectuals. In 1916 González published his first book, Pensamientos de un viejo (Thoughts of an Oldman). The presentation was written by Fidel Cano, the founder of El Espectador newspaper. In 1919 González got his diploma in law at University of Antioquia, however his thesis, "El derecho a no obedecer" (The Right Not To Obey) was not welcome by the Academic Council of the university. González had to make some modifications to the text and published it under the title of "Una tesis" (A Thesis).

=== Judge ===
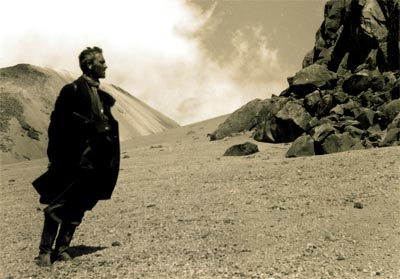
Fernando González in Nevado del Ruiz Snow Mountain in 1929 during the visits that inspired his work "Viaje a pie" ("Trip By Foot").

In 1921 he became Judge of the Superior Tribunal of Manizales. In 1922 he married in Medellín Margarita Restrepo Gaviria, the daughter of former president Carlos E. Restrepo. In 1928 he is nominated Second Judge of the Medellín Tribunals where he knew Benjamín Correa who would become one of his best friends. With Correa he visited several towns in the states of Antioquia, Caldas and Valle del Cauca. From those visits he got the inspiration to one of his most popular books, Viaje a pie (Journey on Foot), published in 1929, but banned by the Archbishop of Medellín under the penalty of mortal sin.

González went to Venezuela in 1931 to meet dictator Juan Vicente Gómez. He considered Gómez a sprout of Libertador Simón Bolívar and they became friends. The dictator was the godfather of one of the sons of González and he dedicated a work to him, "Mi compadre".

=== Diplomatic activity: Consul in Italy ===
González was nominated by President Enrique Olaya Herrera as consul of Colombia in Genoa, Italy in 1932. He went with his family to Europe and that same year Le Livre libre, a publishing house of Paris, published his book Don Mirocletes. About that work Manuel Ugarte wrote a letter to him from Nice saying:

"When your book arrived I had at the moment the visit of Gabriela Mistral and we read with delight some chapters. There is so much force of evocation, so profound irony in the irreverent commentary and so much grace in elegant style!"

From Spain he received two letters of José Vasconcelos on December 14 and 30, 1932. Vasconcelos wrote:

"You are thinking with freedom and that is what we need in America, which always they think in response to an attitude (...) The conferences are a delight, a bitter delight, with depth (...) Your page on the stamp of Ponce de León is wonderful, I was excited, I almost cried."

He received other letter of the Colombian writer José María Vargas Vila, who was exiled in Madrid. Vargas wrote to him:

"You have the vice to think and the virtue to say beautifully what you think; an Artist-Thinker, that is a rare product in our latitudes; you completely fulfil that model; I can not hide that what I love most in your books is the air of controversy that you can breathe in them; that little breath of combat is invigorating and toning; to live is to fight."

In 1933 the Italian police found his notes with criticisms of the regime of Benito Mussolini and Fascism. He was transferred to Marsella due to a petition of the Italian government. Those notes were the origin of his work El hermafrodita dormido (The Sleeping Hermaphrodite), a book with his experiences in the classic art museums of Italy. The book was published in Spain in 1934.

=== Bucarest Villa ===
In 1934 González returned to Colombia establishing in his town, Envigado, a small farm on which to live that he named "Bucarest Villa". There he started to publish the Antioquia Magazine until 1945. In 1935 the Arturo Zapata Printing Press of Manizales published his "El Remordimiento" (The Remorse), an essay in theology written in Marsella (France) and Letters to Estanislao Zuleta.

The former president of Ecuador, José María Velasco Ibarra, who was exiled in Colombia, visited González in Bucarest Villa in 1936 and they became very good friends. To Velasco he dedicated some chapters of Los negroides (The Negroid People) where González called Velasco the first "Politician-Thinker" of the Americas. By his part, Velasco called González in his work Conciencia o barbarie: exégesis de la Conciencia política americana (Conscience or Barbarism: Exegesis of the American Political Conscience), published first by the Atlantida Printing Press of Medellín, "the most original and deep of the South American sociologists".

In that year died in Madrid the Venezuelan novelist Teresa de la Parra with whom González had been friends since 1930 when she visited him in Envigado. It was also the year of Los negroides publication, an essay on New Granada (Colombia, Venezuela and Ecuador), saying that it is the only American region where the merger of races will create an original culture for a unified man. Such merger is a principle of promises and appalling realities at the same time.

=== Otraparte Villa ===
He started in 1940 the construction of his house in Envigado that at that time he called La huerta del alemán (The Garden of the German), but the World War II would make him to change the name for Otraparte (Other Place). The villa was designed with architect Carlos Obregón, engineer Félix Mejía Arango and painter Pedro Nel Gómez. That year he published "Santander", an essay about General Francisco de Paula Santander. The writer Tomás Carrasquilla, his friend and the Colombian novelist he most admired, died.

In Otraparte he received the American playwright Thornton Wilder to whom he dedicated his work El maestro de escuela (The School Teacher). Wilder was in Colombia as a cultural ambassador of his country in South America and wrote about the Garden of the German: "It is more delightful than all Chapinero".

On April 9, 1948, Colombia shuddered with the killing of presidential candidate Jorge Eliécer Gaitán in Bogotá. González dedicated to him some thoughts in 1936 in Los negroides:

"Today I met Jorge Eliecer Gaitán. He is a lively little mestizo, reader. He speaks and you put attention. How is he a man of action? I have known in my life three Don Juans: they never spoke about love. I have known two actives: they were silent. (...) How come to be that he made a political Party? In order to be listened. He is the will to talk made man; the instinct to talk made his face and all his body. He is the body of the man who talks."

In June 1949, after El Bogotazo, González wrote in the edition of his Antioquia Magazine:

"The Colombian people is above its class director; this one does not exist, but it is the cross-eyed abortion of what they call here university. Was it what inspired Gaitán to elaborate that sentence that he used to delight the multitudes: The people is superior to its leaders?"

In 1953 he was nominated consul of Colombia in Europe, but he stayed most of the time in Bilbao where he studied Simon Bolívar and Ignatius of Loyola. His friend Thornton Wilder and Jean-Paul Sartre asked to include his name in the list of candidates to the Nobel Prize in Literature of 1955 and two times he was nominated. The writers Gabriela Mistral, Jacinto Benavente and Miguel de Unamuno admired his work.

In September 1957 González returned to Colombia, to his Otraparte villa, remaining until his death in 1964. In 2006 President Álvaro Uribe approved Law 1068 to exalt the memory, life and work of the philosopher Fernando González and declared Otraparte Home Museum, in Envigado, as a national patrimony.

== Thought ==
Fernando González is called the "Philosopher of Authenticity" and his thought is related to the experience of his life as a man. He used to say that we must live in the simple but bringing awareness of the essentials.

He thought about the Colombian man and, thus, the Latin American, their personality, fights and expressions. He called himself the "Philosopher of the Personality of South America". He wrote that the Latin American man might develop the individuality to arise from their anonymity. He criticized what he called the Latin American vanity that was without substance and invited to express the personality with energy, giving to life the highest value.

González thought his time as the decadence of the principle of freedom and individualism for an action of flocks following calves to worship (Adolf Hitler, Benito Mussolini). He longed for the man of the ancient Egypt, Greece and the Renaissance.

== Works ==
- (1916) Pensamientos de un viejo
- (1916) El payaso interior
- (1919) Una tesis - El derecho a no obedecer
- (1929) Viaje a pie
- (1930) Mi Simón Bolívar
- (1932) Don Mirócletes
- (1933) El hermafrodita dormido
- (1934) Mi compadre
- (1934) Salomé
- (1935) El remordimiento
- (1935) Cartas a Estanislao.
- (1935) "Hace tiempo" de Tomás Carrasquilla
- (1936) Los negroides
- (1936) Don Benjamín, jesuita predicador
- (1936) Nociones de izquierdismos
- (1936–1945) Revista Antioquia
- (1940) Santander
- (1941) El maestro de escuela
- (1942) Estatuto de valorización
- (1945) Cómo volverse millonario en Colombia
- (1950) Cartas a Simón Bolívar
- (1959) Libro de los viajes o de las presencias
- (1962) Tragicomedia del padre Elías y Martina la Velera
- (1963) El pesebre
- (1936) Las cartas de Ripol
