= Estanislao Zuleta =

Colombian academic (1935–1990)

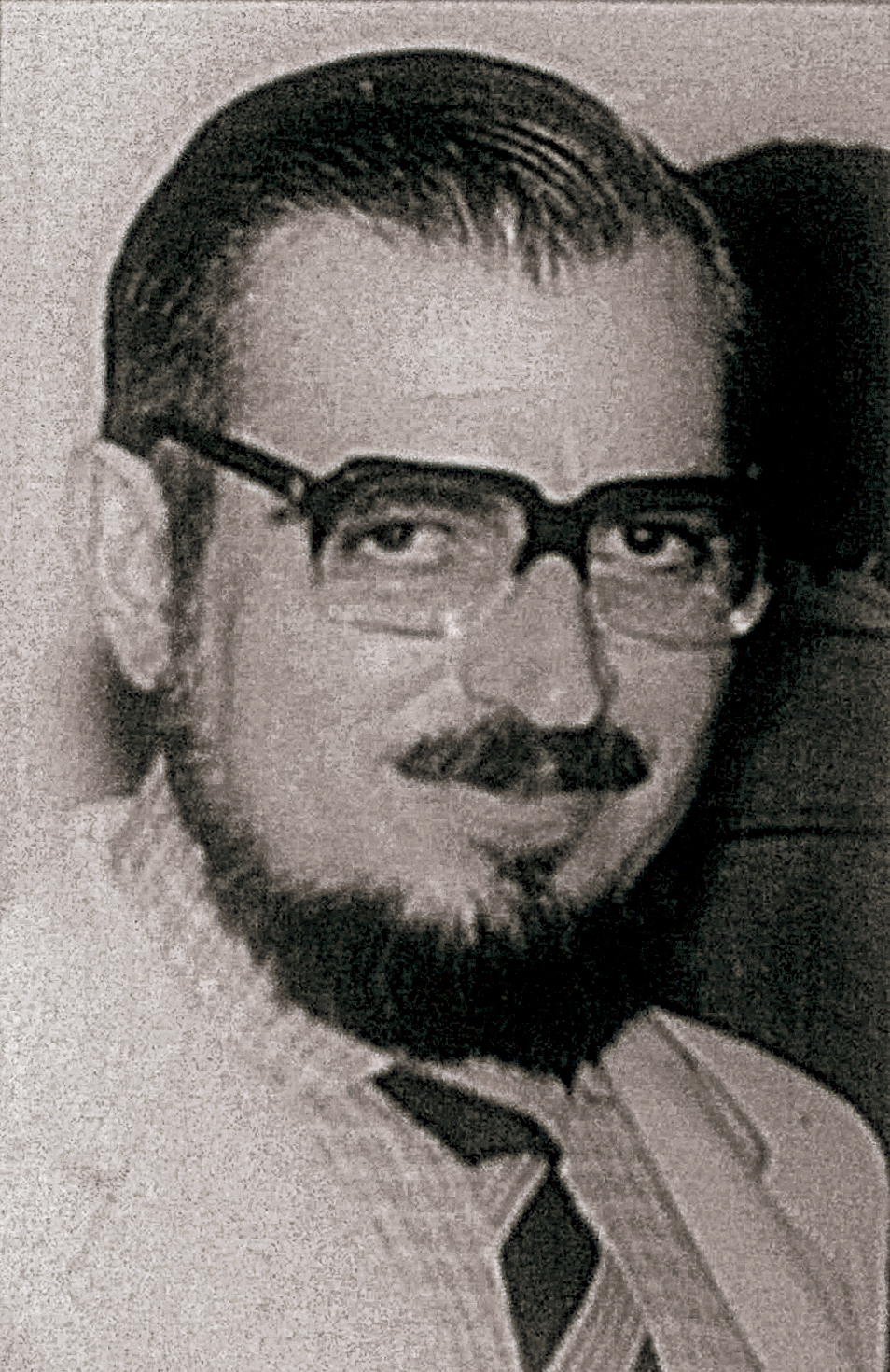
- Born: February 3, 1935; Medellín, Antioquia, Colombia
- Died: February 17, 1990 (aged 55); Santiago de Cali, Valle del Cauca, Colombia

Philosophical work
- Era: 20th-century philosophy
- Region: Western Philosophy
- School: Existentialism
- Main interests: Philosophy, psychology, Marxism, social economy, education, history, Latin America

Estanislao Zuleta (1935 – 1990) was a Colombian philosopher, writer and professor, mainly known for his writings, work at various universities, and many lectures. He wrote treatises and talked about ancient and modern thinkers, and historical analyses about Latin American culture, the Latin American economy, philosophy, psychology and education. He was also an adviser for the United Nations, the Colombian Ministry of Agriculture, the Colombian Institute for Agrarian Reform (Incora), and former president Belisario Betancur Cuartas, and was a writer for the Crisis Magazine of Medellín. He was awarded the Honoris Causa in psychology of University of Valle in 1980. The Estanislao Zuleta Foundation was created after his death to continue to promote his legacy.

== Life ==
Zuleta was born in Medellín on February 3, 1935, to a family of intellectuals. His father died on June 24, 1935, in the same plane crash that killed the famous Tango composer and singer Carlos Gardel. Zuleta was a disciple of the Colombian philosopher Fernando González Ochoa.

Zuleta abandoned the school when he was a teenager to become an autodidact. This led to him reading many of the classics of universal philosophy, literature, history, art and social science.

=== Education and philosophy ===
Zuleta mainly studied political economy, and often held lectures in Bogotá in 1963 in the National University of Colombia and Universidad Libre. He became professor at both universities teaching law and philosophy.

In 1969 he went to Cali to work in Universidad Santiago de Cali, where he became vice-rector. From Cali he returned to his native Medellín to teach in the University of Antioquia.

Zuleta studied many many different philosophers and was considered a left-wing intellectual, and, after studying Capital and Freud´s theories, published an article named Marxism and Psychoanalysis.

=== Professor and research ===
Zuleta worked as a professor and researcher in multiple different fields, including philosophy and socioeconomics.

In 1980 the University of Valle gave him an honorary degree for his research in psychology, and on the day of the ceremony he wrote one his most famous essays, "Praise to Difficulty" (Elogio a la Dificultad). He remained at the University of Valle for the remainder of his life, and died in Cali on February 17, 1990, at the age of 55.

Zuleta founded several newspapers and magazines, such as Crisis (1957), Agitacion (1962) and Estrategias (1963).

=== Personal life ===
Zuleta married María del Rosario Ortiz Santos, before later divorcing her and remarrying Yolanda González in 1964. He had five children: Silvia Zuleta, José Zuleta, Fernando Zuleta, Yolanda Zuleta and Morella Zuleta, and was the grandfather of Ilenia Anton.
