= Fanny Buitrago =

Colombian fiction writer and playwright

- Born: 1943-5; Barranquilla, Colombia
- Occupation: Writer and playwright
- Genre: Fiction; Children's literature
- Notable works: Señora de la miel

Fanny Buitrago is a Colombian fiction writer and playwright best known for her novel Señora de la miel. She was born in Barranquilla, Colombia between 1943 and 1945.

== Early life ==
Fanny Buitrago was born in Barranquilla, Colombia between 1943 and 1945, and grew up in Cali. Her father Luis Buitrago was from Tunja, and her mother was from Barranquilla. Buitrago has a sister Letty, who has worked as her editor and literary agent, and a brother Luis. According to Letty, Fanny "began to read and write at a very early age, under the influence of two indefatigable readers: her father, Luis Buitrago, and her maternal grandfather, Tomás González". As a child she would invent stories for her siblings in exchange for money or chores; around the age of 8 or 9, she started writing stories by hand.

== Literary career ==
Buitrago's best-known book is Señora de la miel (Señora Honeycomb or Mrs Honeycomb; translated into English in 1996). Her first novel was El hostigante verano de los dioses (The Tormenting Summer of the Gods; 1963).

In 1982, Buitrago was an award fellow of the DAAD Künstlerprogramm in Berlin. In 1984 she was a writer in residence at the University of Iowa's International Writing Program.

== Themes ==
She generally avoids overt political messages, although she has dealt with the civil unrest of la Violencia, preferring to focus on broken homes and families which act as metaphors for a country suffering great upheaval. Her works have been associated with the Nadaísmo movement in Colombia.

== Works ==
=== Novels ===
- El hostigante verano de los dioses (1963)
- Cola de zorro (1970)
- Los Pañamanes (1979)
- Señora de la miel (1993); English translation: Señora honeycomb (1996)
- Bello animal (2002)
- El legado de Corín Tellado (2008)
- En torno al frenesí (2020)

=== Short story collections ===
- Las distancias doradas (1964)
- La otra gente (1973)
- Bahía sonora: relatos de la isla (1975)
- Los amores de Afrodita: cuatro cuentos y una novela breve (1983)
- Los fusilados de ayer (1987)
- ¡Líbranos de todo mal! (1989)
- Los encantamientos (2003)
- Canciones profanas (2011)

=== Plays ===
- El hombre de paja (1964)
- A la diestra y a la siniestra (1987)
- Al final del ave María (1991)
- El día de la boda (2005)

=== Literature for children ===
- La casa del abuelo (1979)
- La casa del arco iris: una novela de la infancia (1986)
- Cartas del palomar (1988)
- La casa del verde doncel (1990)
- Historias de la Rosa Luna (2008)
- Un genio en la pantalla (2013)
- Los cuentos de Juanita Campana (2019)

== Awards ==
In 1964, she won the Cali Theater Festival Prize for her play El hombre de paja (Scarecrow).
