= Our Lady of the Assassins =

2000 film

- Theatrical release poster
- Spanish: La virgen de los sicarios
- Directed by: Barbet Schroeder
- Screenplay by: Fernando Vallejo
- Based on: Our Lady of the Assassins by Fernando Vallejo
- Produced by: Margaret Ménégoz; Barbet Schroeder
- Starring: Germán Jaramillo; Anderson Ballesteros; Juan David Restrepo; Manuel Busquets
- Cinematography: Rodrigo Lalinde
- Edited by: Elsa Vásquez
- Music by: Jorge Arriagada
- Distributed by: Paramount Classics (Colombia and United States) Vértigo Films (Spain); Les Films du Losange (France)
- Release dates: 1 September 2000 (Telluride Film Festival); 20 September 2000 (France); 11 October 2000 (Spain); 24 November 2000 (Colombia)
- Running time: 98 minutes
- Countries: Colombia; Spain; France
- Language: Spanish
- Box office: $624,525

Our Lady of the Assassins (Spanish: La virgen de los sicarios) is a 2000 Spanish-language romantic crime drama film directed by Barbet Schroeder from a screenplay by Fernando Vallejo, based on his 1994 novel. The film follows a Colombian author in his 50s who returns to his hometown of Medellín after 30 years of absence to find himself trapped in an atmosphere of violence and murder caused by drug cartel warfare.

== Plot ==
Fernando meets Alexis, a handsome gay youth, at a party of one of his old friends and immediately falls for him. The two begin a relationship which, apart from the sex, consists mainly in Fernando telling Alexis how pastoral the city was when he left, while Alexis explains to Fernando the ins and outs of everyday robbery, violence, and shootings. Even though Fernando has come home to die, his sarcastic worldview is mellowed somewhat by his relationship with Alexis.

He soon discovers that Alexis is a gang member and hitman (or sicario) himself, and that members of other gangs are after him. After several assassination attempts fail because of Alexis' skillful handling of his Beretta, he is finally killed by two boys on a motorcycle. Fernando is partly responsible for this, as Alexis' weapon has been lost before the murder due to Fernando's suicidal impulses.

Fernando visits Alexis' mother and gives her some money, and then walks through the streets aimlessly when he encounters Wilmar (Juan David Restrepo), who bears a striking resemblance to Alexis, not only in his looks but in his entire manner.

He invites Wilmar for lunch and the two begin an affair, rekindling the kind of relationship he had with Alexis. Wilmar is also a killer, but it is a shocking revelation to Fernando when he finds out that Wilmar is the one who shot Alexis. He vows to kill Wilmar, but then learns it was Alexis who started the violence by killing Wilmar's brother, calling for vengeance on him by Wilmar.

When Wilmar goes to say goodbye to his mother before he and Fernando leave the country together, he is killed as well. Seeing that the vicious cycle of atrocities in Medellín denies happiness, Fernando presumably commits suicide, if the last scene is taken to hint at that.

== Cast ==
- Germán Jaramillo as Fernando
- Anderson Ballesteros as Alexis
- Juan David Restrepo as Wilmar
- Manuel Busquets as Alfonso

== Production ==
The film was shot with early high-definition video cameras (Sony HDW-700) in the year 2000. The digital video gives the film a cinéma vérité look and was one of the first uses of HD video for a feature film.

== Reception ==
On the review aggregator website Rotten Tomatoes, 77% of 62 critics' reviews are positive, with an average rating of 6.6/10. The website's consensus reads: "Director Barbet Schroeder presents a bleak, darkly humorous drama about hopeless love in Medellin, Colombia." Metacritic, which uses a weighted average, assigned the film a score of 73 out of 100, based on 25 critics, indicating "generally favorable" reviews.

The film achieved significant recognition at major international film festivals. Its most notable awards and nominations include:

- Venice Film Festival (2000): Won the President of the Italian Senate's Gold Medal and was nominated for the prestigious Golden Lion (Best Film).
- Havana Film Festival (2000): Won the Coral Award for Best Work of a Non-Latin American Director on a Latin American Subject.
- Satellite Awards (2002): Nominated for Best Motion Picture, Foreign Language.

== See also ==
- Movies depicting Colombia
- List of Colombian films
