= Rómulo Gallegos Center for Latin American Studies =

Venezuelan government foundation

Coordinates: 10.5003°N 66.8480°W

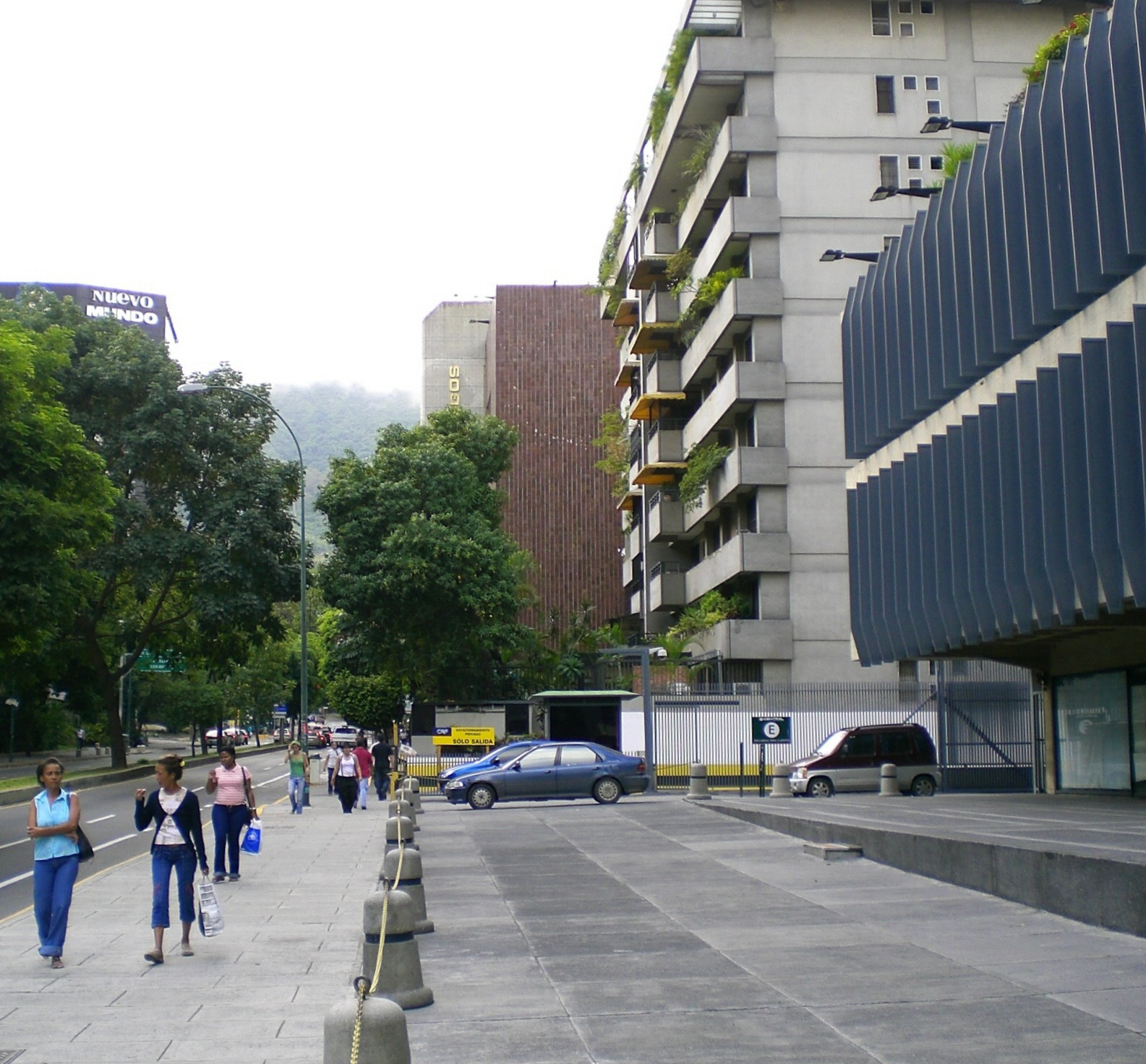
- Type: Cultural
- Industry: Study and promotion of Latin American culture
- Founded: 1974
- Headquarters: Caracas, Venezuela
- Website: Celarg website

Rómulo Gallegos Center for Latin American Studies (Spanish: Fundación Centro de Estudios Latinoamericanos Rómulo Gallegos, CELARG), is a Venezuelan government foundation that aims to study and promote Latin American culture and Latin American integration, taking its inspiration from the life and work of prominent author and former president Rómulo Gallegos. It was established on July 30, 1974 by an international board chaired by Mexican philosopher Leopoldo Zea.

Currently, the CELARG is an integral space where research, academic events, and cultural activities are presented and open to the general public. The CELARG has a high profile as a Latin American and Caribbean center for research, training, creation, cultural production, theatre, literature and public debate.

The CELARG is well known for awarding the Rómulo Gallegos Prize, which includes a cash prize of approximately €100,000, making it among the largest literary prizes in the world.

The CELARG has a matrix-based organisational structure with a democratic and participatory form of governance.

== Present and former personnel ==
- Hugo Achugar, former researcher

== See also ==
- Venezuelan culture
- Rómulo Gallegos Prize

== Sources ==
- Celarg.org.ve
