= Manuel Mejía Vallejo =

Colombian writer and journalist

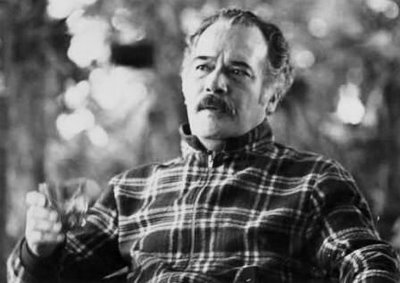
Manuel Mejía Vallejo

Manuel Mejía Vallejo (23 April 1923 – 23 July 1998) was a Colombian writer and journalist. The specialist Luís Carlos Molina says that Mejía represents the Andean aspect of the contemporary Colombian narrative, characterized by a world of symbols which are little by little being lost in the memory of the mountain.

Doctor Honoris Causa of the National University of Colombia. Professor of literature at the National University of Colombia at Medellín, director of the Departmental Printing Press of Antioquia.

Born in Jericó, he studied at the Bolivarian Pontifical University and studied painting and sculpture at the Fine Arts Institute of Medellín. He collaborated as a journalist in the newspaper El Sol. He was the creator of Grupo La Tertulia with Gonzalo Restrepo Jaramillo and Jaime Sanín.

Between 1949 and 1957 he was exiled in Venezuela, Guatemala, Honduras, and El Salvador. In 1978 he was named Director of the Writer's Workshop of the Pilot Public Library of Medellín. His 1988 novel La casa de las dos palmas was awarded the Venezuelan Rómulo Gallegos Prize. Many of his books were set in his home area.

Vallejo died in El Retiro.

== Works ==
=== Novels ===
- La Tierra éramos nosotros (1945), written at the age of 20, published at the request of Grupo Pánidas, coordinated by León de Greiff
- Al pie de la ciudad (1958)
- El día señalado (1964), Premio Nadal
- Aire de Tango (1973)
- Las muertes ajenas (1979), Special mention in the Premio Casa de las Américas
- Tarde de verano (1981)
- Y el mundo sigue andando (1984)
- La sombra de tu paso (1987)
- La casa de las dos palmas (1988), Rómulo Gallegos Prize, Shown on Colombian television.
- Los abuelos de la cara blanca (1991)

=== Short stories ===
- Tiempo de sequía (1957)
- Cielo cerrado (1963)
- Cuentos de zona tórrida (1967)
- Las noches de las vigilias (1975)
- Otras historias de Balandú (1990)
- Sombras contra el muro (1993)
- La venganza y otros relatos (1995), Classic Colombian short story.
- La muerte de Pedro Canales
- Riña de cuatro gallos
- Que despierten sus sueños
- El hombre vegetal
- Aquí yace alguien
- El milagro
- Los julianes
- La guitarra
- El cielo cerrado
- Miedo
- Una canoa bajo el Orinoco
- Palo caido
- El sitio del agua

=== Books of poetry ===
- Prácticas para el olvido (1977)
- El viento lo dijo (1981)
- Memoria del olvido (1990)
- Soledumbres (1990)

== Bibliography ==
- Troncoso, Marino. Proceso creativo y visión del mundo en Manuel Mejía Vallejo. Un acercamiento al proceso cultural antioqueño. Bogotá: Procultura, 1986.
- Varón, Policarpo. Manuel Mejía Vallejo. Bogotá: Procultura, 1989.
