= Fernando Vallejo =

Colombian-born novelist and filmmaker

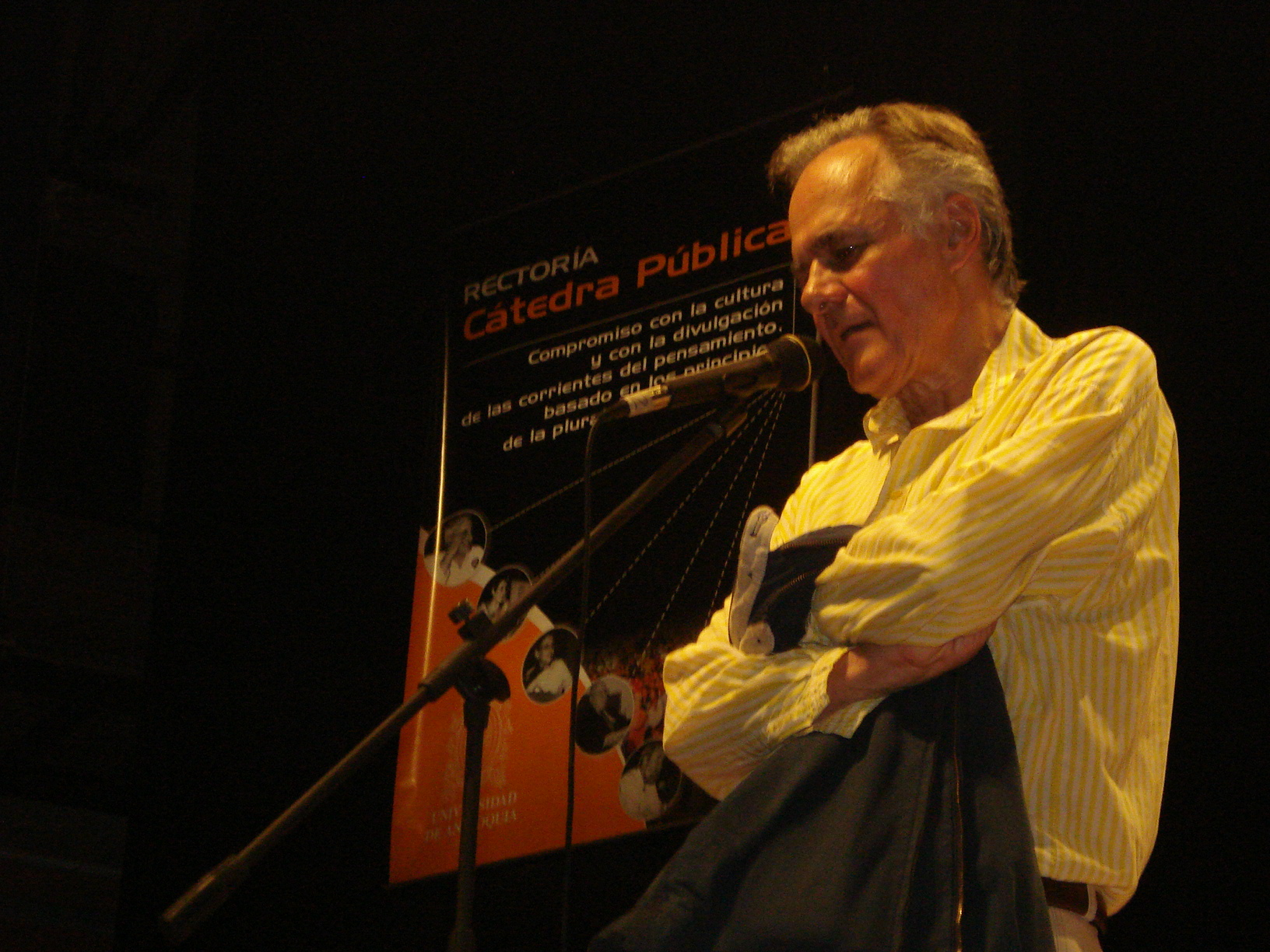
- Born: October 24, 1942 (age 83); Medellín, Antioquia; Colombia
- Occupations: novelist, film director, screenwriter, biographer and biologist
- Writing career
- Genres: biography, essay, novel
- Notable works: El desbarrancadero, La Virgen de los sicarios

Fernando Vallejo Rendón (born 1942) is a Colombian-born novelist, filmmaker and essayist. He obtained Mexican citizenship in 2007.

== Biography ==
Vallejo was born and raised in Medellín, though he left his hometown early in life. He started studies in Philosophy at Universidad Nacional de Colombia in Bogotá, but after one year he abandoned the Faculty of Philosophy and Letters. Soon after he began new studies on biology at the Universidad Javeriana in Bogotá, which he finished. Then he spent one year in Italy at the film academy Cinecittà, where he obtained basic notions on cinema.

Vallejo then returned to Colombia with the project of filmmaking. Yet after difficulties with the Colombian Government in producing and, after he produced it, in presenting his first film (it was censored), he decided to leave his country.

In Mexico he produced and distributed three films about the violence in Colombia. He also wrote an award-winning children's theater script, "El reino misterioso o Tomás y las abejas." He has been living in Mexico since 1971, where he not only produced his cinematographic pieces, but also the whole of his literary work. Despite time spent in other locales, mainly Europe and the United States, most of his novels take place in Colombia. Some of his themes are grammar, biology, philosophy, physics, violence, pederasty, adolescence, drugs, death and politics, mostly related to places such as Antioquia and Medellín; yet his main theme is his life. His books are written in first person, in an autobiographical style, although he manipulates the conventions of autobiography such that the line between autobiography and fiction becomes significantly blurred.

His best-known novel, La virgen de los sicarios, has been translated into English as Our Lady of the Assassins. It deals with his fictionalized return to Medellín, and his relationships with two teenagers caught in the local cycle of violence. The autobiographical/fiction La virgen de los sicarios was made into a full feature film in 2000 and released in the United States as Our Lady of the Assassins.

In 2003, Colombian filmmaker Luis Ospina made a feature-length documentary about him: "La desazón suprema: retrato incesante de Fernando Vallejo ("The Supreme Uneasiness: Incessant Portrait of Fernando Vallejo").

In April 2007, Vallejo obtained Mexican citizenship and published a letter in which he publicly renounced his Colombian nationality. The letter presents the reasons for his decision by mentioning several incidents during his career, among them the recent reelection of President Álvaro Uribe, that eventually led him to this decision.

Vallejo is openly gay and lives with his partner, scenographist David Antón. He is known as an animal rights defender and vegan, and because of his antinatalist views, he has no children. He is an atheist and fiercely critical of religion.

== Selected works ==
- "El reino misterioso o Tomás y las abejas" - [The Mysterious Kingdom, or, Thomas and the Bees] (1975). In Pilo Tamirano Luca: 2o. Concurso Nacional de Obras de Teatro. México, DF: IMSS.
- Logoi: una gramática del lenguaje literario (1983) ISBN 968-16-1324-4
- Barba Jacob, el mensajero (1984) ISBN 968-7234-00-8
- The Blue Days - Los días azules (1985) ISBN 958-614-229-9
- The Secret Fire - El fuego secreto (1987) ISBN 958-614-197-7
- The Roads to Rome - Los caminos a Roma (1988) ISBN 958-614-261-2
- Years of Indulgence - Años de indulgencia (1989) ISBN 958-614-299-X
- El mensajero (1991) ISBN 958-614-325-2
- Among ghosts - Entre fantasmas (1993) ISBN 958-614-378-3
- La virgen de los sicarios - [Our Lady of the Assassins](1994) ISBN 958-24-0141-9
- Chapolas negras (1995) ISBN 958-24-0283-0
- The Darwinist Tautology - La tautología darwinista (1998)
- The Precipice - El desbarrancadero (2001) ISBN 958-8061-62-8
- Rambla Paralela - "La rambla paralela" (2002) ISBN 84-204-4457-X
- My Brother the Mayor - Mi hermano el alcalde (2003) ISBN 84-204-0097-1
- Brief Handbook of Impostorology in Physics - "Manualito de imposturología física" (2005)
- The Whore of Babylon - "La puta de Babilonia" (2007) ISBN 970-37-0326-7
- White Crow - "Cuervo Blanco" (2012) ISBN 978-6071-1195-13

He received the Rómulo Gallegos Prize in 2003, one of the most prestigious prizes for Literature in the Spanish language for El desbarrancadero and, protesting the political climate in Venezuela, donated the cash from the award to Caracas's dogs. In 2024, The Abyss, the English translation by Yvette Siegert, was longlisted for the National Book Award for Translated Literature in the United States.

== Interviews ==
"La sinceridad puede ser demoledora" Ciberletras, 13. Lehman University.

== See also ==
- List of Colombian writers
