= Ecuadorian literature =

Literature written in or related to Ecuador

Ecuadorian literature has been characterized for essentially being costumbrista and, in general, closely linked to events that are exclusively national in nature, with narratives that provide a glimpse into the life of the common citizen.The origins of Ecuadorian literature go back to the ancestral narratives that were passed down from generation to generation. These first stories dealt with fantastical, mythological, and legendary themes.

In recent years, Ecuadorian literature has achieved international notoriety thanks to authors such as Mónica Ojeda and María Fernanda Ampuero.

== 17th century ==
=== Earliest expressions ===
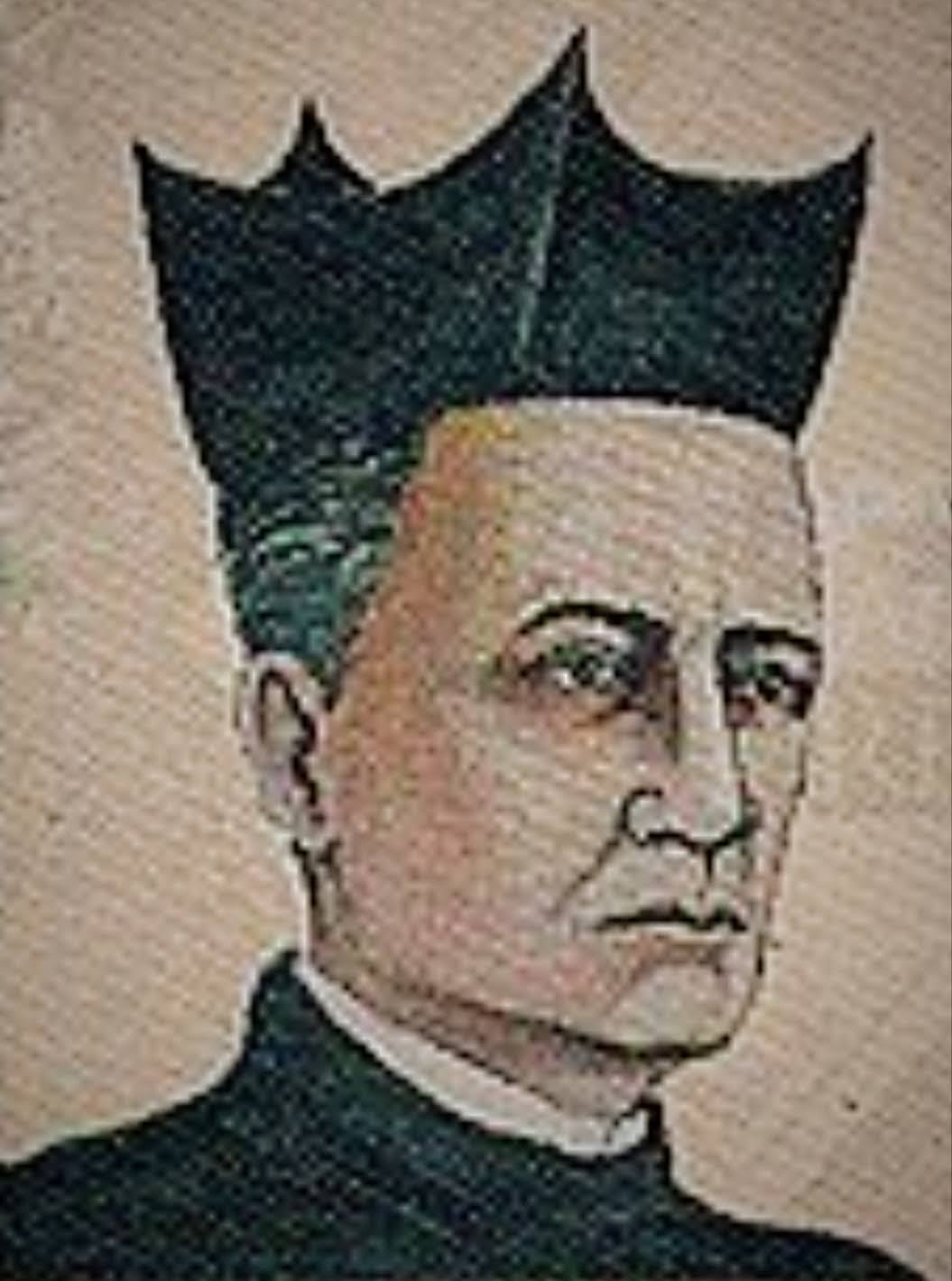
Antonio de Bastidas, first poet of Ecuador

There are no records of written works before the arrival of the Spaniards. This is mostly due to the fact that the Incas did not have an established writing system, so their legends and other tales had to be passed down orally from generation to generation. However, during the Real Audiencia of Quito, starting in the second half of the 17th century, literary expressions began to appear. The most prominent figures of this period were Antonio de Bastidas, Jacinto de Evia—whose El sueño de cielo is considered "the earliest example of the western narrative tradition"—and Jacinto Collahuazo. The first one of these, Bastidas, is considered the first poet of Ecuador, according to literary critic and professor Aurelio Espinosa Pólit. On his part, fellow literary critic Marcelino Menéndez y Pelayo had considered Bastidas to be originally from Seville, making the latter's discovery quite controversial. However, once it was proven that he had been born in Guayaquil, he gained historical importance. Along with his student, Jacinto de Evia, Bastidas wrote most of the poems found in the poetry book Ramillete de varias flores poéticas recogidas y cultivadas en los primeros Abriles de sus años por el Maestro Xacinto de Evia, published in Spain during that period. His style corresponds to the culteranismo movement, since Luis de Góngora had a major influence on the poetry of the time. At the same time, the writings of Ecuadorian indigenous peoples are of great importance. The most famous one is Elegía a la muerte de Atahualpa, attributed to Jacinto Collahuazo, a cacique who was born near the city of Ibarra.

== 18th century ==
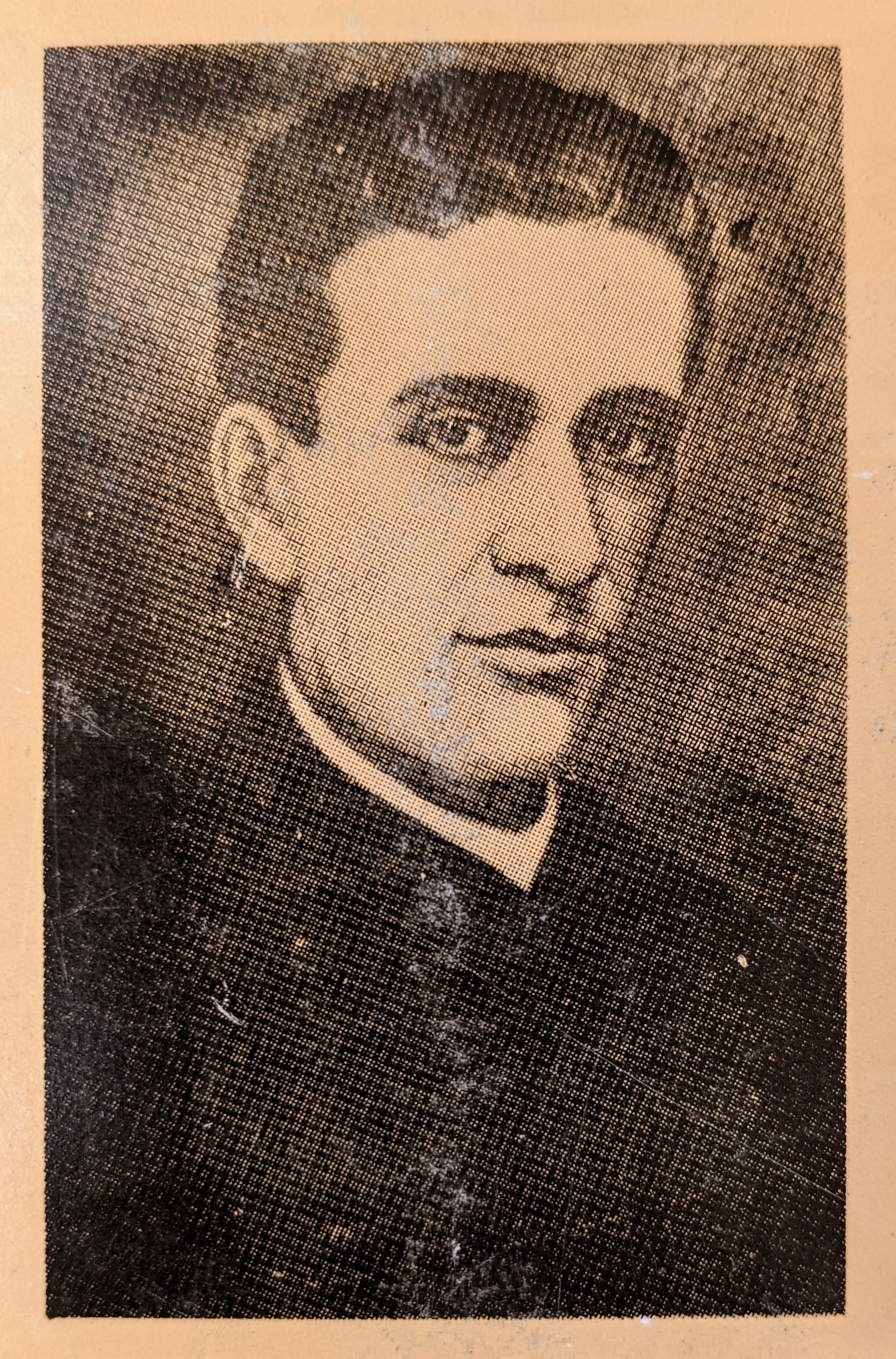
Juan Bautista Aguirre, 18th century poet of the culteranismo movement

During the 18th century, there was an upsurge in the quality of Ecuadorian poetry, according to literary critic Gonzalo Zaldumbide, who discovered the talent of the man who would become the greatest representative of that century's poetry, Father Juan Bautista Aguirre (1725–1786). Aguirre's culteranismo remains strong and renewed, as well as his themes, which included religion, love, comedy, and mythology. His best known poem is Carta a Lizardo. (Note: Also spelled Lisardo in some versions.)

In addition to Aguirre, one work that also stands out is the poetry collection Los jesuitas quiteños del extrañamiento, edited by Espinosa Pólit and published in 1960. It includes works by Jesuit writers who were ousted from the Real Audiencia of Quito by King Charles III and who spent the rest of their lives around the city of Faenza, Italy. From there, they started a literary mailing list that would be collected later by Juan de Velasco under the title Colección de poesías varias hechas por un ocioso en la ciudad de Faenza or simply Ocioso de Faenza. The list is extensive and includes names such as Juan de Velasco, José de Orozco, Pedro Berroeta, and others.

=== Birth of criticism ===
On the other hand, it is important to mention Eugenio Espejo (1747–1795), who would become one of the first literary critics in Latin America, according to Menéndez y Pelayo. His translation of Longinus's treatise On the Sublime, as well as his criticism of the rhetoric of the sermons given at the time, is remarkable. Ironically, Espejo did not speak well of Bautista Aguirre, although the latter's style was far superior albeit a bit more afectado y extravagante (Note: English: Stilted and extravagant) due to his persistent gongorismo.

== 19th century ==
=== Neoclassicism ===
Guayaquil-born José Joaquín de Olmedo (1780–1847) was the author of epic poems about the independence of Ecuador and the Americas. He was a purely neoclassical poet and author of well-renowned works, such as La victoria de Junín. Canto a Bolívar—which Simón Bolívar himself objected to at first, due to Olmedo having included Sapa Inca Huayna Capac as one of the protagonists—and Canción al 9 de octubre—which was chosen as the anthem of the city of Guayaquil, with music composed by Ana Villamil Icaza.

=== Romanticism ===
Romanticism in Ecuador started with Quito-born poetess Dolores Veintimilla (1830–1857), whose themes included love, the struggle against prejudice, and the longing for unrequited love. Her famous poem ¡Quejas! is an example of the great sadness that plagued her and that would ultimately lead her to commit suicide in the city of Cuenca in 1857.

Other romantic poets were Julio Zaldumbide (Quito, 1833–1887) and Numa Pompilio Llona (Guayaquil, 1832–1907). The latter enjoyed great fame both in Ecuador and Peru, where he lived for a time. He served as a diplomat in Spain, Italy, Colombia, and France, where he met Victor Hugo himself.

Regarding romantic narrative, one of its representatives is author Juan León Mera (Ambato, 1832–1894), whose works are considered classics of Ecuadorian and Spanish-speaking literature. His masterpiece, Cumandá o Un drama entre salvajes, is also one of the first Ecuadorian novels and a clear symbol of the ideals of romanticism. He also wrote the National Anthem of Ecuador and a book of short stories, Novelitas ecuatorianas.

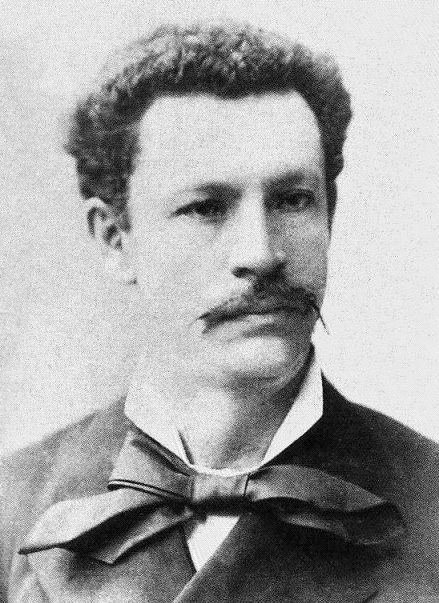
Juan Montalvo (1832–1889)

In the essay genre, Juan Montalvo (1832–1889), is its greatest Ecuadorian representative. His works include Las Catilinarias, Siete tratados, and the novel Capítulos que se le olvidaron a Cervantes. He was a harsh critic of Gabriel García Moreno and dictator Ignacio de Veintemilla. In fact, Montalvo himself helped in removing them from power through his essays, in which he called on the people to rise and topple the dictatorship. This is what one of his famous phrases—Mi pluma lo mató (Note: English: My pen killed him.)— refers to, regarding García Moreno. He gave Veintemilla the nickname Ignacio de la Cuchilla or Ignacio Cuchilla. (Note: English: Ignacio the knife, or Ignacio the blade. Mostly because of Veintemilla's criminal nature. Also, in Spanish, Veintemilla rhymes with cuchilla.)

== 20th century ==
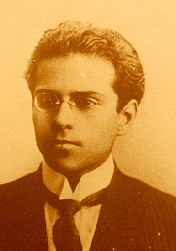
Medardo Ángel Silva (1898–1919)

=== Generación decapitada ===
The modernismo literary movement arrived in Ecuador fairly late when compared to other countries. This was due to the constant civil wars the country was going through because of hostilities between conservatives and liberals. However, the representatives of modernismo in Ecuador reached a very high level of prestige throughout the Americas. Even today, they are still included in world poetry anthologies. All of them read Baudelaire, Hugo, Rimbaud, and Verlaine in the original French, and their poetry is full of allusions to death and mysticism.

The four members of modernismo in Ecuador were Medardo Ángel Silva (1898–1919) and Ernesto Noboa y Caamaño (1891–1927), from Guayaquil; and Arturo Borja (1892–1912) and Humberto Fierro (1890–1929) from Quito. These were later referred to as the Generación decapitada, (Note: English: Beheaded generation) mainly because two of them—Silva and Borja—committed suicide at a young age, while Noboa and Fierro died later in life under unclear circumstances, also believed to have committed suicide. They were also grouped together because of the commonalities found in their poems.

Silva was the one who received the most praise and is considered "the most pure of Ecuadorian modernists" and the finest poet Ecuador has ever had, although he published only one book of poetry during his lifetime, El árbol del bien y del mal. Other Ecuadorian poets also considered modernistas are Alfonso Moreno Mora (Cuenca, 1890–1940) and José María Egas (Manta, 1897–1982).

During the early 20th century, other poets who stood out were Jorge Carrera Andrade (Quito, 1903–1978), whose work is characterized by the constant combination of universal and local themes, as well as Gonzalo Escudero (Quito, 1903–1971), Hugo Mayo (Manta, 1895–1988), and Alfredo Gangotena (Quito, 1904–1944).

=== La Generación del 30 ===
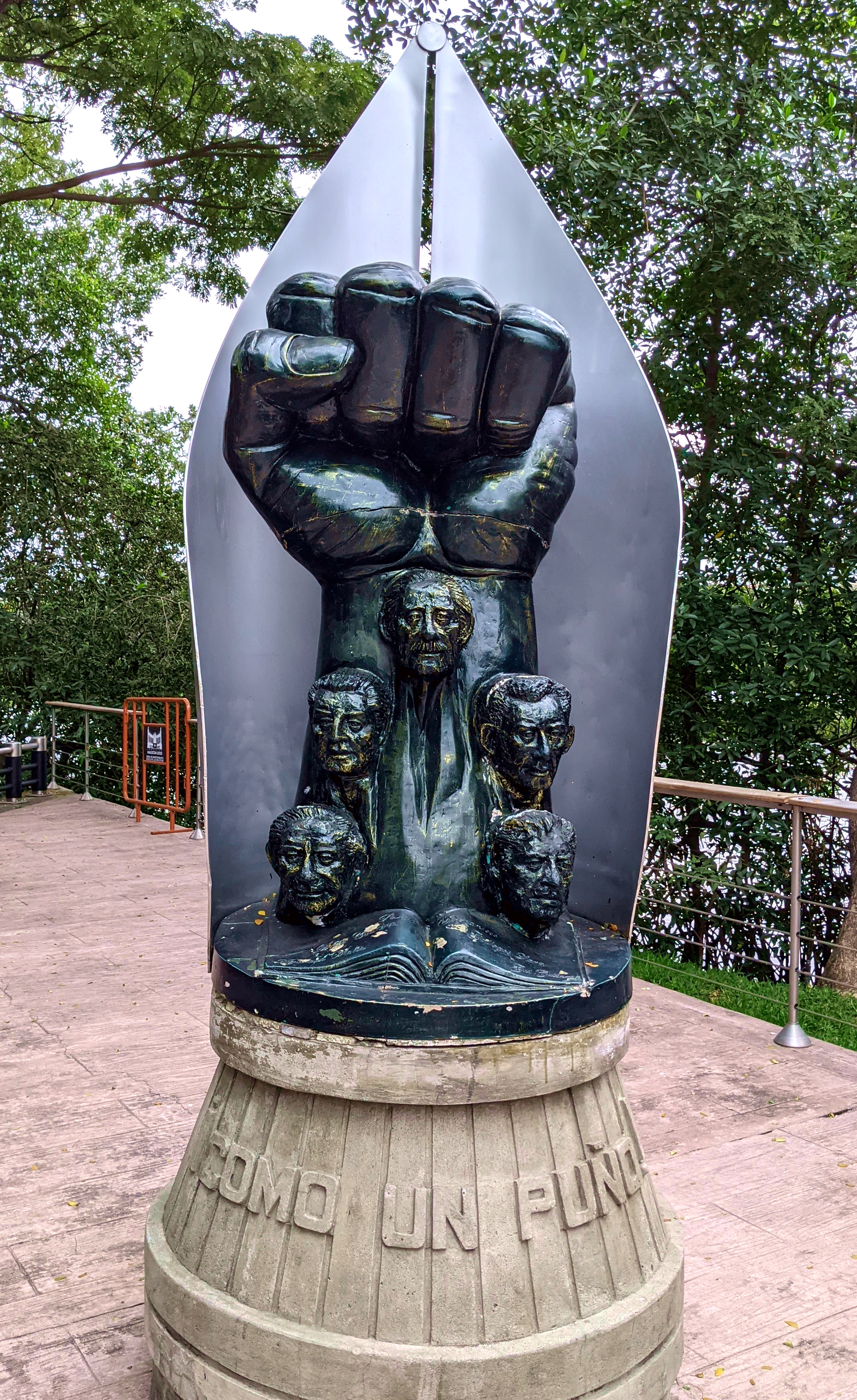
Monument to the Guayaquil Group

Literary realism began in Ecuador with A la costa, a historical novel written by Luis A. Martínez (Ambato, 1869–1909), which professor Felipe Aguilar Aguilar called una de las más grandes novelas ecuatorianas. (Note: English: One of the greatest Ecuadorian novels) On his part, writer Jorge Enrique Adoum referred to it as (...) la primera novela ecuatoriana. Primera expresión de la voluntad de ver y de explicarse el país. (Note: English: (...) the first Ecuadorian novel. First expression of the will to see and to explain the country.) The novel recounts the ups and downs experienced by a boy from a conservative family in Quito when his father dies. He is then forced to work on a hacienda and, at the same time, has to see how his family gradually deteriorates until it disintegrates completely. All this happens against the backdrop of the victory of the liberal revolution. It has been compared to the works of Upton Sinclair.

However, the book that marked the appearance of social themes in literature is Los que se van, a compilation of short stories by Guayaquil-born writers Demetrio Aguilera Malta (1909–1981), Joaquín Gallegos Lara (1909–1947) and Enrique Gil Gilbert (1912–1973). Professor David William Foster referred to the book as:

[...] the most famous short story collection written in Ecuador. Its fame is well deserved, for the book redefined the myths of reading a canon that was indecisive and unable to provide ample appreciation for the manifold factors that create a national culture.

— David William Foster, Handbook of Latin American Literature

Aguilera, Gallegos, and Gil, along with José de la Cuadra (1903–1941) and Alfredo Pareja Diezcanseco (1908–1993), made up the so-called Grupo de Guayaquil. All these writers were committed to social issues and were determined to show the reality of the cholo montubio through popular parlance, harsh scenes, profanity, and other resources.

The numerous works produced by the members of this group include classics such as Los Sangurimas by José de la Cuadra, Nuestro pan by Enrique Gil Gilbert, Las cruces sobre el agua by Joaquín Gallegos Lara, Siete lunas y siete serpientes by Demetrio Aguilera Malta, and Baldomera by Alfredo Pareja Diezcanseco. All these books are well-renowned for their strong social content and for the crudeness with which they portray reality.

However, the greatest example of modern Ecuadorian literature is most likely novelist Jorge Icaza Coronel (1906–1978) and his work Huasipungo, perhaps the Ecuadorian novel that has been translated to the most languages. The novel El chulla Romero y Flores is another famous work by Icaza with relevant social content.

Trying to find a unifying theme in the narrative approaches by the generation of writers of the 1930s is an arduous task, due to the amount of criticism and comments that make it ambiguous to categorize the principles and ideals of a minor literature such as the one from Ecuador. Icaza himself, in his essay, Relato, espíritu unificador, en la generación del año 30, complains about the lack of commitment from Ecuadorian scholars and intellectuals:

[...] acostumbrados al comentario y al estudio de valores individuales y aislados en la historia de la literatura ecuatoriana, [quienes] no lograron captar e interpretar a su debido tiempo y en su justa perspectiva [...] el carácter unificador, en actitud y espíritu, de cuanto significaba y de cuanto constituía para la cultura nacional [...] la obra literaria de los relatistas de la generación del año 1930—forma mestiza, emoción telúrica, contornos de personalidad hispanoamericana.

[...] used to the commentary and study of individual and isolated values in the history of Ecuadorian literature, [who] failed to grasp and interpret in due time and in its proper perspective [...] the unifying character, in attitude and spirit, of what it meant and how much it represented for the national culture [...] the literary work of the writers of the 1930 generation—the mestizo form, the underlying emotion, the delineation of the Hispano-American personality.

— Jorge Icaza Coronel, Relato, espíritu unificador en la generación del año '30

Moreover, Icaza mentions that this unifying spirit beat in the three groups of Ecuadorian writers located in Guayaquil, in Quito, and in Loja, despite the regional differences, in a country that was in the evolutionary stage of development, forming a society that sought a destiny in the political, economic, and literary spheres, where the capital cities of the montubios, cholos, and indigenous peoples incorporated the presence of national themes in the literature.

Authors and representative works of the 1930s generation include:

- Pablo Palacio: Un hombre muerto a puntapiés (1927), Débora (1927), and Vida del ahorcado (1932)
- Humberto Salvador: En la ciudad he perdido una novela... (1929)
- Alfredo Pareja Diezcanseco: Baldomera (1938)
- Demetrio Aguilera Malta: Don Goyo (1933)
- José de la Cuadra: Los Sangurimas (1934)
- Enrique Terán: El cojo Navarrete (1940)
- Adalberto Ortiz: Juyungo (1943)
- Joaquín Gallegos Lara: Las cruces sobre el agua (1946)
- Ángel Felicísimo Rojas: El éxodo de Yangana (1949) and Un idilio bobo (1946)
- Nelson Estupiñán Bass: Cuando los guayacanes florecían (1954)
- Jorge Icaza Coronel: El chulla Romero y Flores (1958)

=== Second half of the 20th century ===
Ecuadorian narrative gained strength once again starting in the 1970s, coinciding with the appearance of major literary magazines such as La bufanda del sol, which began to be published in 1972. The most outstanding works during this time renewed the local narrative by using experimental techniques to transmit messages of political and social criticism. Under this umbrella, iconic novels started to appear, such as Entre Marx y una mujer desnuda by Jorge Enrique Adoum (Ambato, 1926–2009), La Linares by Iván Egüez (Quito, 1944–), El pueblo soy yo by Pedro Jorge Vera (Guayaquil, 1914–1999), and María Joaquina en la vida y en la muerte by Jorge Dávila Vásquez (Cuenca, 1947–).

During this period, novelist Alicia Yánez Cossío (Quito, 1928–) burst onto a literary scene that until then had been dominated by male figures, thanks to the publication in 1973 of her acclaimed novel Bruna, soroche y los tíos. The latter was followed by more than a dozen novels that cemented Yánez's place as the great Ecuadorian author of the 20th century, with a style that mixed criticism of the status of women in society and the search for the mestizo identity with magical realism. Other women writers also stood out in later years: poetess and narrator Sonia Manzano Vela (Guayaquil, 1947–) and essayist Lupe Rumazo (Quito, 1933–).

Several narrative authors also stood out during this time, including Eliécer Cárdenas (Cañar, 1950–2021), particularly with Polvo y ceniza; Jorge Velasco Mackenzie (Guayaquil, 1949–2021), with his novel about marginalization in Guayaquil, El rincón de los justos; and Abdón Ubidia (Quito, 1944–). On the short story genre, the greatest representatives during this time were: Raúl Pérez Torres (Quito, 1941–), who, with a prolific career as a short story writer managed to win the prestigious Casa de las Américas Award; Javier Vásconez (Quito, 1946–), and Huilo Ruales (Ibarra, 1947–).

In poetry, César Dávila Andrade (Cuenca, 1918–1967) especially stands out, although also important are: Efraín Jara Idrovo (Cuenca, 1926–2018), Alejandro Carrión (Loja, 1915–1922), Iván Carvajal (San Gabriel, 1948–), Julio Pazos Barrera (Baños, 1944–), Humberto Vinueza (Guayaquil, 1942–2017), Carlos Eduardo Jaramillo Castillo (Loja, 1932–), Euler Granda (Riobamba, 1935–2018), Fernando Nieto Cadena (Quito, 1947–2017), Sonia Manzano Vela, Luis Alberto Costales (Riobamba, 1926–2006)—considered one of the "absentees" of the Eugenio Espejo Award— and Adalberto Ortiz (Esmeraldas, 1914–2003). The latter was known for describing the spirit of the Afro-Ecuadorian population in Ecuador.

== 21st century ==
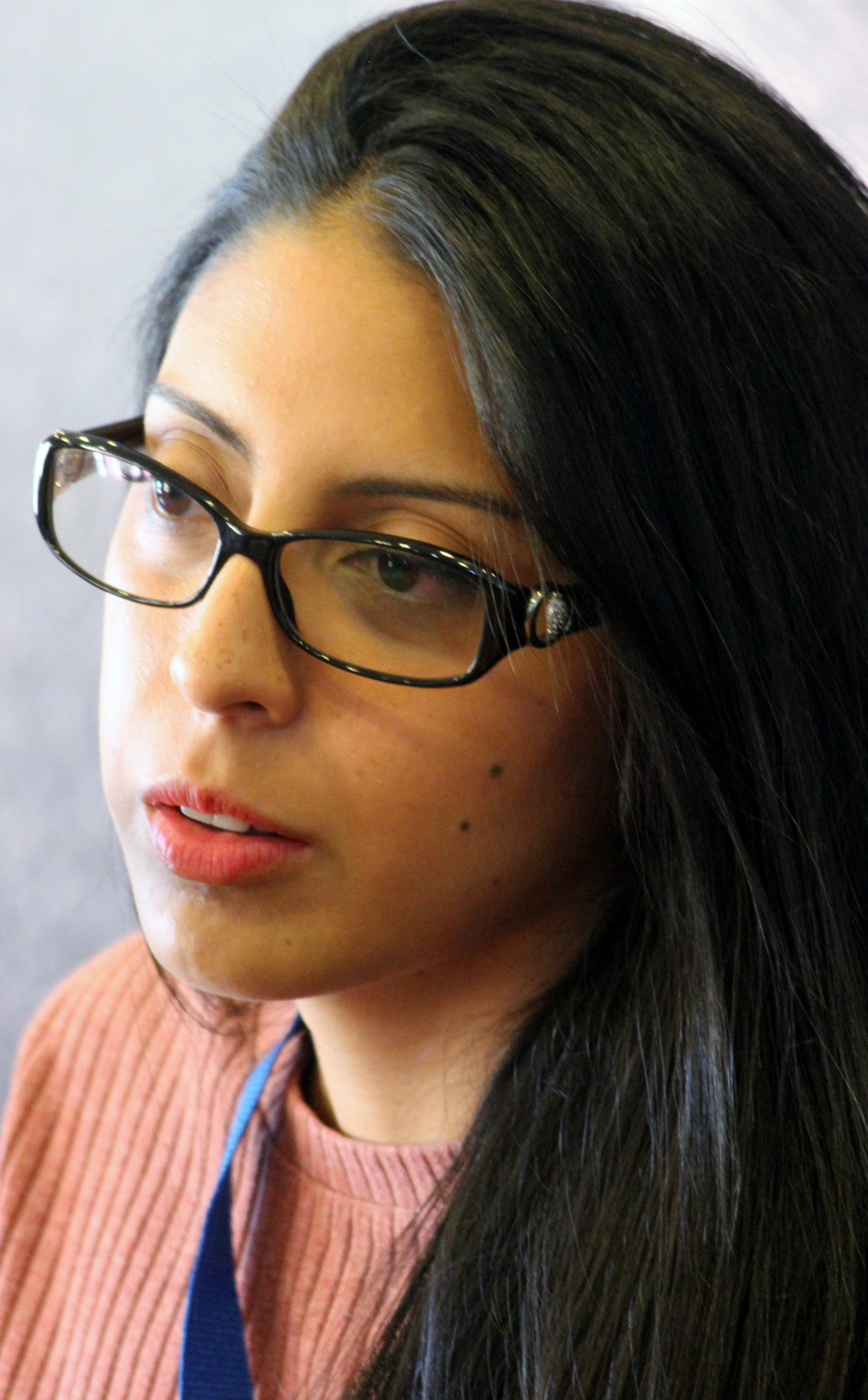
Mónica Ojeda, one of today's most outstanding writers.

In recent years, Ecuadorian narrative has been marked by the emergence of three women writers who have achieved international renown: Brazilian-born Gabriela Alemán (Rio de Janeiro, 1968–), Mónica Ojeda (Guayaquil, 1988–), and María Fernanda Ampuero (Guayaquil, 1976–). The latter two have described wretched and horrific settings in their work to explore violence, power relations, and family ties, in titles such as Nefando (2016), Mandíbula (2018), and Pelea de gallos (2018). Ojeda, in particular, has received international recognition, including the ALBA Award for Narrative and the Prince Claus Next Generation Award, as well as being a finalist for the Mario Vargas Llosa Biennial Award for Novel and the Ribera del Duero Short Narrative Award.

Other writers who have stood out in recent decades are Raúl Vallejo (Manta, 1959–), with his novel Gabriel(a) (2019) and Óscar Vela (Quito, 1968–).

The most relevant names in poetry today are: Juan José Rodinás (Ambato, 1979–), Carla Badillo Coronado (Quito, 1985–), Ernesto Carrión (Guayaquil, 1977–), María Auxiliadora Balladares (Guayaquil, 1980–), and Mónica Ojeda.

== See also ==
- Culture of Ecuador
- LGBT literature in Ecuador
- The Man Who Was Kicked to Death

== Bibliography ==
- Adoum, Jorge Enrique (1980). "Prologue". In Vera, Pedro Jorge (ed.). Narradores ecuatorianos del 30 (in Spanish). Caracas: Biblioteca Ayacucho. ISBN 8466000631.
- Aguilar Aguilar, Felipe (1991). "Narrativa ecuatoriana: los últimos veinte años". In Malo González, Claudio (ed.). Ecuador contemporáneo (in Spanish). Mexico City: National Autonomous University of Mexico. pp. 133–148. ISBN 968-36-1990-8.
- Becco, Horacio Jorge, ed. (1990). Poesía colonial hispanoamericana (in Spanish). Caracas: Biblioteca Ayacucho. ISBN 9802761095.
- Benavides, O. Hugo (2010). The Politics of Sentiment: Imagining and Remembering Guayaquil. Austin, Texas: University of Texas Press. ISBN 978-0-292-78295-2.
- Calarota, Antonella (2015). El Modernismo en Ecuador y la "generación decapitada" (PhD thesis) (in Spanish). Madrid: National University of Distance Education. hdl:20.500.14468/19240.
- Espinosa Pólit, Aurelio, ed. (1960a). Los dos primeros poetas coloniales ecuatorianos (siglos XVII y XVIII): Antonio de Bastidas y Juan Bautista Aguirre (in Spanish). Quito: Biblioteca Ecuatoriana Mínima.
- Espinosa Pólit, Aurelio (1960b). Los jesuitas quiteños del extrañamiento (in Spanish). Quito: Biblioteca Ecuatoriana Mínima.
- Evia, Jacinto de (1676). Ramillete de varias flores poéticas recogidas y cultivadas en los primeros Abriles de sus años por el Maestro Xacinto de Evia (in Spanish). Madrid: Nicolás de Xamarés.
- Foster, David William (2015). Handbook of Latin American Literature (2nd ed.). Oxfordshire: Routledge. ISBN 9781317518259.
- Handelsman, Michael (2001). "2. Personajes negros y realismo social. El caso del Grupo de Guayaquil". Lo afro y la plurinacionalidad. El caso ecuatoriano visto desde su literatura (in Spanish). Quito: Editorial Abya Yala. pp. 25–60. ISBN 9789978046883.
- Icaza Coronel, Jorge (27 December 1966). "Relato, espíritu unificador en la generación del año '30". Revista Iberoamericana (in Spanish). 32 (62). Liverpool: Liverpool University Press: 211–216. doi:10.5195/reviberoamer.1966.2250. ISSN 0034-9631.
- Lima, Alex Paul (2015). Juan Bautista Aguirre (1725-1786) y los orígenes de la nación ecuatoriana (PhD thesis) (in Spanish). City University of New York.
- Menéndez y Pelayo, Marcelino, ed. (1893–1895). Antología de poetas hispano-americanos (in Spanish). Madrid: Royal Spanish Academy.
- Miller, Marilyn Grace (2004). "5. Dis/Encounters in the Labyrinths: Mestizaje in Quito". Rise and Fall of the Cosmic Race: The Cult of Mestizaje in Latin America. Austin, Texas: University of Texas Press. ISBN 9780292778535.
- Olmedo, José Joaquín (2010). La victoria de Junín (PDF) (in Spanish) (Biblioteca Bicentenario ed.). Bogotá: National University of Colombia.
- Pérez, Galo René (2001). Literatura del Ecuador (cuatrocientos años): criítica y selecciones (in Spanish). Quito: Editorial Abya Yala. ISBN 9978046763.
- Vallejo Corral, Raúl (2006). "La Bufanda del Sol, segunda etapa: aproximación inicial (Estudios)" (PDF). Kipus: Revista andina de letras (in Spanish) (20). Quito: Corporación Editora Nacional: 107–127. hdl:10644/1362. ISSN 1390-0102.
- Yánez Cossío, Alicia (1991). Vánegas Coveña, Sara (ed.). Bruna, soroche y los tíos (in Spanish) (Estudio introductorio y notas ed.). Quito: Libresa. ISBN 9789978490945.
