= Pablo Palacio (writer) =

20th-century Ecuadorian writer

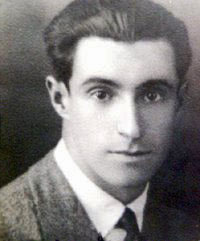
- Born: Pablo Arturo Palacio Suárez; January 25, 1906; Loja, Ecuador
- Died: January 7, 1947 (aged 40); Guayaquil, Ecuador
- Resting place: Guayaquil General Cemetery
- Education: Central University of Ecuador
- Occupations: Writer and lawyer
- Writing career
- Genres: Avant-garde; Social realism
- Notable works: The Man Who Was Kicked to Death; Débora (novella); Vida del ahorcado; (novella)

Pablo Arturo Palacio Suárez (Loja, 25 January 1906–Guayaquil, 7 January 1947) was an Ecuadorian writer and lawyer. He was one of the founders of the avant-garde movement in Ecuador and Latin America and one of the most controversial members of the so-called 1930s generation of Ecuadorian authors.

His work is very different from that of the costumbrismo writers of the time, especially since the predominant trends in fiction then focused more on indigenismo and social realism.

His literary work is not very extensive, and consists of the play Comedia Inmortal (1926), the short story collection Un hombre muerto a puntapiés (1927) and the novels Débora (1927) and Vida del ahorcado (1932).

== Biography ==
=== Childhood ===
His mother, Clementina Palacio Suárez, was unmarried and thus he was registered in the Civil Registry as having an unknown father. Years later when Palacio was already renowned in literary circles, his father Agustín Costa tried to recognize him as his son and give him his surname, but Palacio rejected him.

It is said that in 1909, when he was three years old and while his nanny was washing clothes, Palacio fell into a stream in El Pedestal, near the city of Loja. The torrent of water swept him for more than half a kilometer. When he was rescued, he was already very beaten up. The tale told about this incident having caused him 77 injuries on his head is an exaggeration.

His mother's family came from an illustrious line of Spanish nobility. Unfortunately, the family branch to which Palacio belonged had become poor, and what is even worse: his mother died when he was still a young child. This forever left its mark on his personality and psyche, which is why the theme of his mother's absence would be one of the most recurrent motifs in all his literary work. He went to live under the care of his aunt Hortensia Palacio Suárez and was financially supported by his uncle José Ángel Palacio Suárez, who was comfortably wealthy. At the age of six, he was enrolled in the School of the Christian Brothers, where he studied between 1911 and 1917. Upon seeing Palacio's intelligence, his uncle felt motivated to pay for his secondary and university studies. His secondary studies were at the Bernardo Valdivieso School, where he stood apart as one of the best students.

Palacio published his first work in 1920, when he was 14 years old. It was the poem Ojos negros, which appeared in La tribuna de los niños, a section of the magazine Iniciación published by the Society of Literary Studies of the Lojano School.

In 1921, he obtained second prize (an honorable mention) at the Floral Games that critic Benjamín Carrión had brought from the capital to the city of Loja. Pablo won the award for the short story El huerfanito which, according to Carrión, who presided over the jury that awarded the prize, lacked proper syntaxis but was a sort of "intentional nonsense": Entre descalificar al audaz que tomaba el pelo al jurado o premiarlo por curiosidad, optamos por lo último. (Note: English: Between disqualifying the bold [participant] who was pulling the jury's leg, or awarding him the prize out of curiosity, we opted for the latter.) When the time came to receive the prize, Palacio, who was still a teenager, showed his rebellious nature by flatly refusing to kneel in front of the beauty queen from whom he was to receive a bouquet of roses and the award.

He moved to Quito after graduating from high school and, in October 1924, he enrolled in the Central University of Ecuador to study law. During his stay in Quito, he actively participated in the political and social unrest related to the Julian Revolution of 1925, led by a group of young officers of the Ecuadorian Army with progressive tendencies. Palacio, along with other artists of his generation, began to question the social and aesthetic values imposed by the elites on the cultural and literary circles of the time, both in Quito and in the rest of the country. In 1926, the year when the Ecuadorian Socialist Party was founded, Palacio started to lean towards a revolutionary socialism of a Marxist nature.

=== Literary career ===
In February 1926, he published the play Comedia inmortal in Efigie magazine, although his contemporaries did not really appreciate his talent as a playwright, only as a novelist, short story writer, and sharp-witted critic. According to historian, critic, and linguist Hernán Rodríguez Castelo, Comedia inmortal is a "strange" play, difficult to categorize, since it cannot be compared to anything else that existed at the time. However, Palacio himself referred to it as a comedia de enredo. (Note: English: Comedy of errors)

In 1927, he published the short story collection The Man Who Was Kicked to Death (Spanish: Un hombre muerto a puntapiés)to the chagrin of his uncle José Ángel Palacio Suárez who, upon reading a review titled Un hombre muerto a puntapiés, por Pablo Palacio (Note: English: The man who was kicked to death by Pablo Palacio) naively thought his nephew and protégé had committed a crime. Moreover, according to writer and journalist Alejandro Carrión Aguirre, Palacio's first short story collection sparked quite a scandal, since never before had stories of that nature been written, in a manner that was: irritante, hiriente [...] con un conocimiento de la vida que se parecía al conocimiento que tiene el cirujano de la carne viviente: cortante, ensangrentado. (Note: English: Irritating, wounding [...] with such knowledge of life similar to the knowledge that a surgeon has of living flesh: cutting, bloody.)

Also in 1927, Palacio published the novella Débora, a subjective work that stands out due to the way he delved deeply into his characters' psychologies. According to Carrión, the novella is Un libro desconcertante, dislocado como un puzzle. (Note: English: A disconcerting book, dislocated like a puzzle)

Later, in 1931, he began to publish some fragments of his novella Vida del ahorcado, most of which had already been published in avant-garde magazines like Hontanar (Loja) and Élan (Quito).

His first two books are considered characteristic of the Latin American avant-garde movement.

After the Ecuadorian Civil War of 1932, which was waged on the streets of Quito, Benjamín Carrión appointed Palacio as undersecretary of education. At the time, he also worked as a journalist for socialist newspaper La Tierra. In 1936, he was appointed as professor at the Department of Philosophy of the Central University and published his short story Sierra.

He served as dean of the School of Philosophy and Letters, a professor of literature and philosophy when Benjamín Carrión was minister of education, and served as deputy secretary of the Constituent Assembly under General Alberto Enríquez Gallo.

=== Marriage ===
In 1937, he married sculptor and painter Carmen Palacios Cevallos, who has been described as la reina del mundo intelectual capitalino, (Note: English: The queen of the intellectual world in the capital city) by Ecuadorian author Alejandro Carrión Aguirre and, due to her beauty, escultora y escultura (Note: English: Sculptor and sculpture), by her friend, author José de la Cuadra. The couple had two children, a boy and a girl. The girl was born with intellectual disabilities.

=== Illness and death ===
In 1939, he began to suffer from mental illness and to complain of an "upset stomach". He underwent a miracle cure that ended up poisoning him. He then traveled to Salinas for a period of convalescence. When he returned, he was tanned and seemingly brimming with health, but strange things started to happen to him that perplexed his friends: mental fugues, sudden amnesia, forgetting words in the middle of a sentence, staying distracted for long periods of time, absences in which he seemed out of touch with reality, nervousness, unprovoked irritability, constant restlessness, all of that was out of character for him. For some, like Hernán Rodríguez Castelo, the cause of Palacio's progressive madness could have been a result of the injuries he received as a child when he fell in the stream at El Pedestal. For others, like writer Abdón Ubidia, the cause could have been a venereal disease, like syphilis. This hypothesis, however, has been vehemently refuted by his son, Pablo Alejandro Palacio Palacios.

In 1945, as his mental faculties diminished, his wife had to admit him to a psychiatric hospital in Guayaquil, under the care of Dr. Carlos Ayala Cabanilla. There, she worked as a nurse to cover the cost of a treatment that lasted more than a year.

Palacio died at noon on 7 January 1947 at the General Hospital in Guayaquil, at the age of 40.

== List of works ==
=== Published works ===
- Comedia inmortal (Quito, February 1926): play, published in Efigie magazine
- Un hombre muerto a puntapiés (Quito, January 1927): short story collection
- Débora (Quito, October 1927): novella
- Vida del ahorcado (Quito, November 1932): novella

=== Short stories ===
Title	Year of Publication	Place of Publication	Notes
El huerfanito	June 1921	Loja	Alba nueva magazine
Amor y muerte	May–June 1922	Loja	Alba nueva magazine
El frío	February 1923	Loja	Inquietud magazine
Los aldeanos	March–April 1923	Loja	Inquietud magazine
Rosita Elguero	March 1924	Loja	Magazine of the Bernardo Valdivieso School
Una carta, un hombre y algunas cosas más	June 124	Loja	Iris magazine
Un nuevo caso de marriage en trois	December 1925	Quito	América magazine
Gente de provincias	January–February 1926	Quito	América magazine
Un hombre muerto a puntapiés	April 1926	Quito	Hélice avant-garde magazine This short story was the first literary work in Ecuador concerned with homosexual themes, and according to literary critic Galo René Pérez, is one of the masterpieces of Ecuadorian literature. A comic book adaptation was published in 2015, with words and drawings by Jorge Cevallos.
El antropófago	May 1926	Quito	Hélice avant-garde magazine
Brujerías	May 1926	Quito	Hélice avant-garde magazine
Las mujeres miran las estrellas	September 1926	Quito	Hélice avant-garde magazine
¡Señora!	January 1927	Guayaquil	Savia magazine
Luz lateral	January 1927	Quito	Un hombre muerto a puntapiés short story collection
La doble y única mujer	January 1927	Quito	Un hombre muerto a puntapiés short story collection
El cuento	January 1927	Quito	Un hombre muerto a puntapiés short story collection
Relato de la muy sensible desgracia acaecida en la persona del joven Z	January 1927	Quito	Un hombre muerto a puntapiés short story collection
Novela guillotinada	September 1927	Havana	Revista de Avance magazine
Una mujer y luego pollo frito	May 1929	Quito	Llamarada magazine
Sierra	October–November 1930	Loja	Revista Universitaria magazine

== See also ==
- Ecuadorian literature
- Guayaquil Group
- LGBT literature in Ecuador
- The Man Who Was Kicked to Death

== Bibliography ==
- Íñiguez Granda, José Luis (2019). Visión jurídico-crítica de la obra literaria de Pablo Palacio (PDF) (Law degree thesis) (in Spanish). Loja: Private Technical University of Loja.
- Lopez, Pierre (1998). "Pablo Palacio y su Comedia Inmortal: sobre el teatro ecuatoriano hasta finales de los años 1940". In Meyran, Daniel; Ortiz, Alejandro; Suréda, Francis (eds.). Théâtre, public, société (in Spanish). Perpignan, France: Presses universitaires de Perpignan. pp. 450–459. ISBN 978-2-908912-61-6.
- Palacio, Pablo (2008). Fernández, María del Carmen (ed.). Obras completas (in Spanish) (Volume 141 of Colección Antares ed.). Quito: Libresa. ISBN 9789978491027.
- Pérez, Galo René (2001). Literatura del Ecuador (cuatrocientos años): criítica y selecciones (in Spanish). Quito: Editorial Abya Yala. ISBN 9978046763.
- Salazar Estrada, Yovany (October 2006). Pablo Palacio: Heraldo de la moderna narrativa ecuatoriana (1906–1947) (in Spanish). Quito: Presidency of the Republic of Ecuador. ISBN 978-9978-45-402-2.
- Young, Richard; Cisneros, Odile (2011). Historical Dictionary of Latin American Literature and Theater. Lanham, Maryland: Scarecrow Press. ISBN 9780810874985.
