= Débora =

1927 Ecuadorian novella

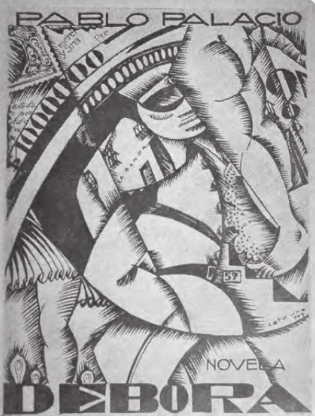
- Author: Pablo Palacio
- Cover artist: Guillermo Latorre
- Language: Spanish
- Genre: Novella; experimental literature; metafiction
- Publication date: October 1927
- Publication place: Ecuador
- Original text: Débora at Spanish Wikisource

Débora is an experimental novella by Ecuadorian writer Pablo Palacio, published in Quito in October 1927. In 2007, the novella was included in a compilation of the author's complete works by publishing house Libresa. The plot of the book follows Teniente (Note: English: Lieutenant)—a character who's only referred to by that name and who is never fully defined— during a walk through the streets of Quito in search of a love conquest or any event of importance, which ultimately never comes.

The novella is made up of a series of passages that depict several everyday events in Teniente's walk. These passages are constantly interrupted by the ramblings of the narrator, his comments on the protagonist, and the tedium caused by the very construction of the plot. The passages in the story are not presented in a linear succession of events, but rather form a series of subjective images from the narrator's perspective. Some of the techniques employed in the book include stream of consciousness and metafiction.

The first edition of the book featured drawings by cartoonists Guillermo Latorre and Kanela on the front and back covers, respectively.

== Analysis ==
=== Identity of the protagonist ===
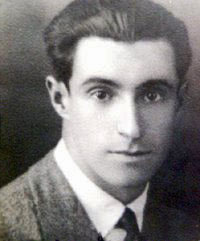
Portrait of Pablo Palacio, the author

As a character, Teniente is described as ridiculous, superficial, and unbalanced. These qualities are emphasized by the recurring insults—written in the second person—which the narrator uses to reprimand him. The character's main trait is his "unfulfilled longing," which is expressed through his search for a romantic fling. In his daily life he is a slave to customs and appearances, which leads the narrator to describe him as:

[A] dead and inactive man, an eternal parasite, lacking willpower (...) [an] eternal social imitator, who longs because we all long. (Note: Original in Spanish: [un] hombre muerto e inactivo, eterno parásito avolitivo (...) [un] perpetuo imitador social que suspira porque suspiramos los otros.)

The character is a reference to the July Revolution, which took place on 9 July 1925 and was carried out by lieutenants of the National Army of Ecuador.

According to literary critic and essayist Wilfrido H. Corral and professor Teresita Mauro Castellarín, the beginning of the novella suggests that the character of Teniente is a schizophrenic split of the narrator himself. The passage in question states:

Teniente, you have been my host for years. Today I cast you from me so you become a source of derision for some and of melancholy for others. Many will find themselves in your eyes as they find themselves at the bottom of a mirror. Since you are a man, you could have been a foreman or a shoeshiner. Why do you exist? It would have been better if you had not existed. You bring nothing, you have nothing, you will give nothing (…) You truly are useless. (Note: Original in Spanish: Teniente, has sido mi huésped durante años. Hoy te arrojo de mí para que seas la befa de los unos y la melancolía de los otros. Muchos se encontrarán en tus ojos como se encuentran en el fondo de los espejos. Como eres hombre, pudiste ser capataz o betunero. ¿Por qué existes? Más valiera que no hubieras sido. Nada traes, ni tienes, ni darás (...) Es verdad que eres inútil.)

On his part, professor Vladimiro Rivas says that, more than a character, Teniente is a puppet manipulated by Palacio, whose intention would have been to construct a novel that would constitute a puppet show. According to Rivas, the back cover of the novella's original edition would support this interpretation. This back cover, illustrated by cartoonist Kanela, depicts a puppet dressed as a military man, pulled by strings that go up to a curtain on which the word Guiñol (Note: English: Guignol) is written.

A third possible interpretation is to see Teniente as a metaphor for literary creation and the writing process, which would explain the moment when the narrator expels him from within himself and the narrator's constant ramblings about how to write a novel. In this interpretation, the character of Débora would symbolize the literary ideal that is impossible to achieve, and the insults aimed at the protagonist would stem from the author's inner conflict regarding his work.

The end of the novel shows Teniente dying in an absurd manner just when Débora, the imaginary muse for which the novella is named, enters the scene.

=== Challenged literary concepts ===
A constant throughout the novel is the criticism of established models and assumptions about how a novel should be put together or how a story should progress. Common are the statements in which the narrator speaks ironically about the average reader's expectations regarding the text. This happens, for instance, when the narrator speaks of giving Teniente a sweet memory and says:

It is necessary (...) to give Teniente what he did not have, the incentive in novels and also in life (...) (Note: Original in Spanish: Es preciso (...) dar al Teniente lo que no tuvo, la prima de las novelas y también de la vida (...))

Or, when describing Teniente's state of mind, the narrator says:

Perhaps clearer for the reader would be the case of the drunkard who, realizing that he is doing wrong, can do no right no matter how much he tries. (Note: Original in Spanish: Tal vez sea más cercano para el lector el caso igual del borracho que, comprendiendo que obra mal, no logra obrar bien por más que hace.)

One of the clearest passages, and one that best illustrates Palacio's intention in the novel, happens at a moment when the ramblings have almost completely replaced the plot, so the narrator states, in relation to Débora's own text:

The novel melts away in laziness and I'd like to whip it and see it jump, scream, buck, fill flaccid bodies with activity; but I would only be conferring a literary status on it. (Note: Original in Spanish: La novela se derrite en la pereza y quisiera fustigarla para que salte, grite, dé corcoveos, llene de actividad los cuerpos fláccidos; mas con esto me pondría a literaturizar.)

Other targets of satire in the novella are the literary genres of romanticism and realism. In the case of romanticism, Teniente is reviled several times by the narrator for expecting to be saved from monotony and vulgarity by some love affair, like those that take place in books or films. In the same vein, numerous passages speak sarcastically of the typical events that would happen in a romance novel, as opposed to the almost complete lack of action in Débora. When the narrator speaks of making up an incentive for Teniente, for instance, he immediately says afterwards:

But the story won't be here: one has to look it up in the index of some romance novel (...) This supposed memory that must be in every man's treasure chest takes Teniente's breath away. (Note: Original in Spanish: Pero la historia no estará aquí: se la ha de buscar en el índice de alguna novela romántica (...) Este supuesto recuerdo que debe estar en los arcones de cada hombre, hace suspirar al Teniente.)

Even the general plot of the novel, which can be summarized as a man in search of a beloved, could be taken in its entirety as a parody of idealism in the romantic genre, only in this case the search turns out to be completely futile.

In the case of realism, Palacio's criticism focuses on what the author perceives as the falseness of his postulates, assumptions, and narrative techniques, especially his principle of describing reality as it occurs. An example of this is when Teniente B (Note: English: Lieutenant B)—a character other than the protagonist—tells the story of an adventure and the narrator notices that it had not happened in real life in the way it was written but rather that it had been "transformed by literature." (Note: Original in Spanish: refaccionado por la literatura) Later on, Palacio outlines his critique of realism in the following terms:

The realist novel is pitifully deceitful. It abstracts the facts and leaves the field full of gaps; it gives them an impossible continuity, because what is true, what is silenced, would not interest anyone. Who is going to find it interesting that Teniente's socks are torn, and that this constitutes one of his most unbearable tragedies, the essential imbalance of his spirit? (...) What happened was that the large, ample realities were considered, while the small realities were silenced for being useless. But the small realities are the ones that, when they accumulate, constitute a life. The others are only suppositions: "it may be the case," "it is very possible." The truth is that it is almost never the case, even if it is very possible. Lies upon lies upon lies. The shameful thing is what is said of these lies: I give you a summary of real life, what I am writing is the plain and simple truth. And everybody believes it. (Note: Original in Spanish: La novela realista engaña lastimosamente. Abstrae los hechos y deja el campo lleno de vacíos; les da una continuidad imposible, porque lo verídico, lo que se calla, no interesaría a nadie. ¿A quién le va a interesar el que las medias del Teniente están rotas, y que esto constituye una de sus más fuertes tragedias, el desequilibrio esencial de su espíritu? (...) Sucede que se tomaron las realidades grandes, voluminosas; y se callaron las pequeñas realidades, por inútiles. Pero las realidades pequeñas son las que, acumulándose, constituyen una vida. Las otras son únicamente suposiciones: «puede darse el caso», «es muy posible». La verdad: casi nunca se da el caso, aunque sea muy posible. Mentiras, mentira y mentiras. Lo vergonzoso está en que de esas mentiras dicen: te doy un compendio de la vida real, esto que escribo es la pura y neta verdad; y todos se lo creen.)

=== Social aspects ===
During Teniente's walk around Quito, the narrator makes several observations of a social nature. One of the most notorious is about the modernization of the city, which the bourgeoisie and the nouveau riche—identified in the text as gemebundos (Note: English: Lamenters) and neo-gemebundos, (Note: English: Neo-lamenters) despite the level of poverty of the inhabitants—are opposed to on idealistic grounds. While the former do not act and are "legitimately hurt" (Note: Original in Spanish: legítimamente heridos) by this modernization, the neo-gemebundos are described as "pen and paper revolutionaries" (Note: Original in Spanish: revolucionarios del lápiz o de la pluma) and "slaves to the past" (Note: Original in Spanish: esclavos del pasado) apart from being criticized for doing new things and for being "tied to tradition." (Note: Original in Spanish: atados a la tradición) According to Wilfrido H. Corral, this criticism creates an analogy to the dichotomy between literary tradition and the avant-garde.

On the other hand, Teniente's passage through the city's slums is explicit in terms of Palacio's vision of poverty:

Above all, emotions are stirred by the children, tossed like rags (...) Child of the ragged room; child of human agency: your mother will throw you out on the streets. You will be either a thief or a prostitute. Out of hunger, you will gnaw your own flesh. (Note: Original in Spanish: Sobre todo emocionan los niños, arrojados como trapos (...) Hijo de la habitación trajinada; hija de la agencia humana: tu madre te echará a la calle. Serás ladrón o prostituta. De hambre te roerás tus propias carnes.)

== Reception ==
Débora was well received by the Ecuadorian literary circles of the time. In his prologue to the 2005 edition of Palacio's collected works, author Raúl Vallejo Corral points out that in 1927, poet Gonzalo Escudero said about the novel:

(…) we thought we were walking through the hermetic cells of a house of lunatics. The great house of lunatics of sane men. (Note: Original in Spanish: (…) hemos creído recorrer las celdas herméticas de una casa de orates. La gran casa de orates de los hombres cuerdos.)

A review published in 1928 in Loja newspaper Renacimiento was also positive, stating that it was superior to Un hombre muerto a puntapiés and that reading the novella was akin to:

Hearing the ghastly mincing of the scalpel raging against tissues and nerves, and the dull gush of blood from torn arteries. (Note: Original in Spanish: oír el picadillo espeluznante del escalpelo que se ensaña contra los tejidos y nervios, y el sordo brotar de sangre de arterias desgarradas.)

That same year, journalist Xavier Icaza referred to Débora as follows:

(A) novel for sleepless nerves, a gut-wrenching [book to be] read by the flame of insomnia (Note: Original in Spanish: (Una) novela de nervios desvelados, tajeada cardíaca para leída a la flama de insomnia.)

Moreover, Vallejo also points out that in January 1929, Chilean newspaper Reflector published a review praising the novel's "successful reflection of the intimacy of human beings" (Note: Original in Spanish: logrado reflejo de la intimidad del ser humano) and referred to it as "experimental psychological foundation." (Note: Original in Spanish: cimiento psicológico experimental)

Throughout the years, the novella has gained more praise and attracted more attention internationally. Journalist Patricio Lennard, writing for newspaper Página 12, said that the book was "deliciously arbitrary" (Note: Original in Spanish: deliciosamente arbitrario) and that it exposed "a joy for the artificial, for incongruity, for digression." (Note: Original in Spanish: un gozo por lo artificial, por la incongruencia, por la digresión)

Furthermore, when referring to the book in his Diccionario de autores latinoamericanos, Argentine writer and translator César Aira said it was like "Nausea as written by Macedonio Fernández." (Note: Original in Spanish: La náusea escrita por Macedonio Fernández.)

Finally, literary critic Humberto E. Robles said that the novella represented "a theory and practice of the art of writing an antinovel." (Note: Original in Spanish: una teoría y práctica del arte de antinovelar)

== See also ==
- Ecuadorian literature
- Pablo Palacio (writer)

== Bibliography ==
- Palacio, Pablo (2005). Vallejo Corral, Raúl (ed.). Un hombre muerto a puntapiés: y otros textos [The man who was kicked to death and other works] (in Spanish). Caracas: Biblioteca Ayacucho. ISBN 9789802764198.
- — (2007). Fernández, María del Carmen (ed.). Obras completas [Complete works] (in Spanish). Quito: Editorial Libresa. ISBN 978-9978-49-102-7.

=== By other authors ===
- Aira, César (2001). Diccionario de autores latinoamericanos [Dictionary of Latin American authors] (in Spanish). Buenos Aires: Emecé Editores. ISBN 9789500422055.
- Capello, Ernesto (2011). City at the center of the world: space, history, and modernity in Quito. Pittsburgh, Pennsylvania: University of Pittsburgh Press. ISBN 978-0-8229-7743-8.
- Cevallos, Santiago (2006). Contaminación narrativa. Las estéticas de Jorge Icaza y Pablo Palacio bajo el signo de lo barroco y lo cinematográfico [Narrative contamination. The aesthetics of Jorge Icaza and Pablo Palacio under the sign of the baroque and the cinematographic.] (PDF) (Master's degree in cultural studies thesis) (in Spanish). Quito: Simón Bolívar Andean University. Archived from the original (PDF) on 15 October 2016.
- Coonrod Martínez, Elizabeth (2004). "The Latin American Innovative Novel of the 1920s: A Comparative Reassessment". In McClennen, Sophia A.; Fitz, Earl E. (eds.). Comparative Cultural Studies and Latin America. Indiana, United States: Purdue University Press. pp. 34–55. ISBN 978-1-55753-358-6.
- Córdova González, Ruth Violeta (2015). El estilo vanguardista en las obras de Pablo Palacio. Un aporte en la construcción de una actitud proactiva para la mediación lectora [Avant-garde style in the works of Pablo Palacio. A contribution to the construction of a proactive attitude for reading mediation.] (PDF) (Master's degree in children's and young adult literature thesis) (in Spanish). Loja, Ecuador: Universidad Técnica Particular de Loja. Archived from the original (PDF) on 7 April 2020.
- Corral, Wilfrido H. (1979). "Colindantes sociales y literarios de «Débora» de Pablo Palacio" [Adjacent social and literary ideas in Pablo Palacio's Débora]. Texto Crítico (in Spanish) (14). Veracruz, Mexico: Universidad Veracruzana: 188–199. ISSN 0185-0830. OCLC 716056345.
- — (2001). "Humberto Salvador y Pablo Palacio: política literaria y psicoanálisis en la Sudamérica de los treinta" [Humberto Salvador and Pablo Palacio: literary politics and psychoanalysis in South America in the thirties] (PDF). In Polit Dueñas, Gabriela (ed.). Crítica literaria ecuatoriana, hacia un nuevo siglo: antología [Ecuadorian literary criticism, towards a new century: anthology] (in Spanish). Quito: Latin American Faculty of Social Sciences. pp. 251–306. ISBN 9978-67-062-9.
- Mauro Castellarín, Teresita Lidia (1997). "Pablo Palacio, precursor de la nueva novela" [Pablo Palacio, forerunner of the new novel]. Anales de Literatura Hispanoamericana (in Spanish). 26 (2). Madrid: Complutense University of Madrid: 381–394. ISSN 0210-4547.
- Robles, Humberto E. (1980). "Pablo Palacio: el anhelo insatisfecho" [Pablo Palacio: the unfulfilled longing]. Caravelle. Cahiers du monde hispanique et luso-brésilien (in Spanish). 34 (34). Toulouse: Presses Universitaires du Midi: 141–156. doi:10.3406/carav.1980.1506. ISSN 0008-0152.
- Salmeri, Raffaela (2000). La hiperconsciencia del acto creativo en algunos textos de la narrativa ecuatoriana del siglo XX [The hyperconsciousness of the creative act in certain texts of the 20th-century Ecuadorian narrative] (PDF) (Master's degree in Latin American literature thesis) (in Spanish). Quito: Simón Bolívar Andean University. Archived from the original (PDF) on 3 November 2018.
- Zumárraga, Sebastián Antonio (2018). La disolución del personaje en dos obras de Franz Kafka: La obra y El castillo, y en dos novelas de Pablo Palacio: Débora y Vida del ahorcado [The dissolution of the character in two works by Franz Kafka: The Burrow and The Castle, and in two novels by Pablo Palacio: Débora and Hanged Life] (Bachelor's degree in communication thesis) (in Spanish). Quito: Pontifical Catholic University of Ecuador.
