= Claude Couffon =

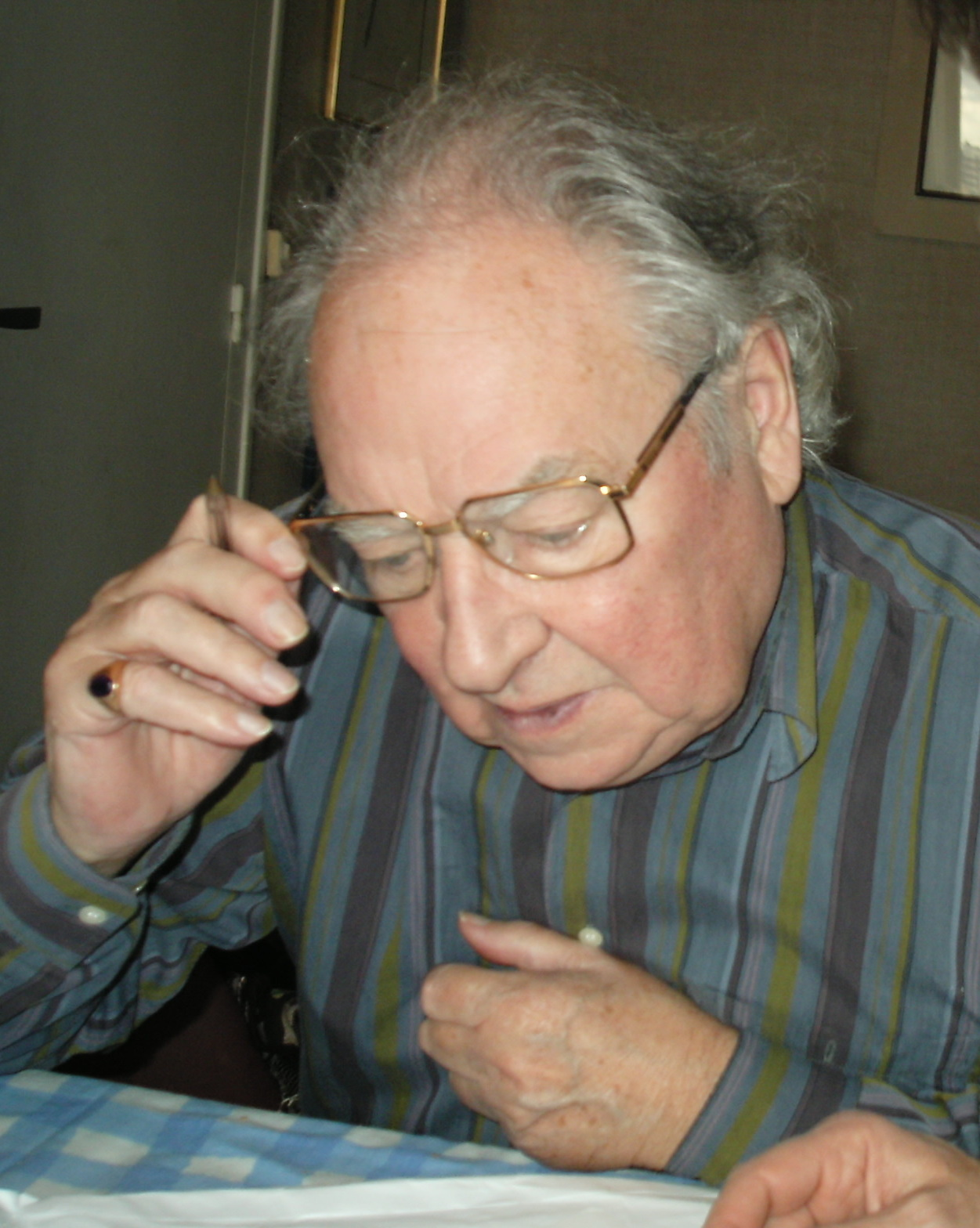
Claude Couffon in 2003

Claude Couffon (May 4, 1926 – December 18, 2013) was a prolific Spanish to French translator, university professor, French poet, and an expert in Spanish and Latin American literature.

== Biography ==
He taught Spanish and Latin American literature at Le Sorbonne, Paris, until he retired in 1991.

== Accolades ==
Claude Couffon was a member of the Cuban Language Academy.

== Works ==
=== Poetry books ===
- Le Temps d’une ombre ou d’une image, 1973
- Célébrations, 1979
- Corps automnal, Caractères, 1981

https://www.google.com/opengallery/manage/items/20773232?hl=en&q=claude%20couffon&itemIds=hwHJTX1aPNZ34g

- Absent Présent, Caractères, 1983
- À l’ombre de ce corps, 1988
- Intimité, 2008

=== Essays and Anthologies ===
- À Caen avec les Canadiens, Rouff (Paris), 1949.
- Les Japonais à genoux, Rouff (Paris), 1949.
- À Grenade sur les pas de Garcia Lorca, Seghers, 1962.
- Nicolas Guillen, coll. "Poètes d'aujourd'hui", Seghers, 1964.
- L'Espagne, coll. "Monde et voyage", Larousse, 1964.
- Rafael Alberti, coll. "Poètes d'aujourd'hui", Seghers, 1965.
- Histoires et légendes de l'Espagne mystérieuse, Tchou, 1968.
- Contes populaires espagnols, Tchou, 1968.
- Miguel Angel Asturias, coll. "Poètes d'aujourd'hui", Seghers, 1970.
- René Depestre, coll. "Poètes d'aujourd'hui", Seghers, 1986.
- Poésie dominicaine, Patino, 1996 .
- Poésie cubaine du XXe siècle, Patino, 1997.
- Poésie hondurienne du XXe siècle, édition bilingue, Patino, 1997.
- Histoires étranges et fantastiques d'Amérique latine, coll. "Suites", Métailié, 1998.
- Poésie mexicaine du XXe siècle, édition bilingue, Patino, 2004.
- Un demi-siècle de poésie - les poètes de Cartactères, par Claude Couffon et Nicole Gdalia, Caractères, 2004.
- Poètes de Chiapas, bilingue, Caractères, 2009.

=== Spanish to French Translations ===
Rafael Alberti

- À la peinture, prologue et traduction de Claude Couffon. Dessins de Rafael Alberti. Le Passeur, Nantes, 2001.

Miguel Angel Asturias

- Poèmes indiens, préface de Claude Couffon, trad. de Claude Couffon et René-L..-F. Durand, coll. "Poésie/Gallimard", 1990

Silvia Eugenia Castillero

- Zooliloques, Indigo

Camilo José Cela

- San Camiolo 1936, trad. de Claude Bourguignon et Claude Couffon
- Office des ténèbres 5, trad. de Claude Bourguignon et Claude Couffon, 1978

Blas de Otero

- Je demande la paix et la parole: Pido la paz y la palabra, poèmes traduits de l'espagnol par Claude Couffon

Joaquin Balaguer

- Colón precursor literario: traduits de l'espagnol par Claude Couffon

Lourdes Espinola

- Les mots du corps, bilingue, Indigo

Gabriel García Márquez

- L'Automne du patriarche, Grasset, 1977.
- Chronique d'une mort annoncée, Grasset, 1981
- La Mala Hora, Grasset, 1986

Nicolas Guillen

- Le Chant de Cuba - Poèmes 1930-1972,

Jorge Icaza

- L'Homme de Quito, Albin Michel, 1993

Luis Mizon

- Poèmes du sud et autres poèmes, bilingue, trad. par Roger Caillois et Claude Couffon, Gallimard, 1982
- Le songe du figuier en flamme, poèmes traduits par Claude Couffon, éd. Folle Avoine, 1999
- Jardin des ruines, poèmes traduits par Claude Couffon, éd. Obsidiane, 1992
- Le Manuscrit du Minotaure, texte traduit par Claude Couffon, éd. Brandes, 1992
- La Mort de l'Inca, roman, traduit par Claude Couffon, éd. Le Seuil, 1992
- Voyages et retour, poèmes traduits par Claude Couffon, éd. Obsidiane, 1989
- Noces, texte traduit par Claude Couffon, éd. Brandes, 1988
- Province perdue, éd. Cahiers de Royaumont, 1988
- Terre brûlée, poèmes traduits par Claude Couffon, éd. Le Calligraphe, 1984

Myriam Montoya

- Fugues, bilingues, coll. "Poètes des cinq continents", L'Harmattan, 1997

Pablo Neruda

- Chant général
- J'avoue que j'ai vécu, Gallimard, 1975

Milagros Palma

- Le Pacte, trad. de Pierre Rubira et Claude Couffon, Indigo

Ernesto Sábato

- L'écrivain et la catastrophe, Seuil, 1986

Manuel Scorza

- Roulements de tambours pour Rancas, Grasset, 1972
