= La Costa (disambiguation) =

La Costa (born 1951) is an American country music singer.

La Costa may also refer to:

- La Costa Resort and Spa, a luxury destination hotel located in Carlsbad, California, United States
- La Costa, a residential area of Carlsbad, California, United States
- La Costa Partido, a department of Buenos Aires Province, Argentina
- La Costa (German: Seit), a località of the municipality of Laives, Italy
- Departamento de la Costa, a former subdivision of Peru

== See also ==
- A la costa, a 1904 novel by Luis A. Martinez
