= The Man Who Was Kicked to Death =

Short story by Pablo Palacio

- Author: Pablo Palacio
- Original title: Un hombre muerto a puntapiés
- Language: Spanish
- Genre: Detective short story
- Publication date: April 26, 1926
- Publication place: Ecuador

The Man Who Was Kicked to Death (Spanish: Un hombre muerto a puntapiés) is a detective short story by Ecuadorian writer Pablo Palacio, published on April 26, 1926 in the magazine Hélice and a year later in the short story collection of the same name. It is one of Palacio's most notable works, as well as being the first Ecuadorian literary work to openly address the topic of homosexuality.

The work has been adapted for television, theater, and comics.

According to writer and literary critic Galo René Pérez, The Man Who Was Kicked to Death is one of the masterful narratives of Ecuadorian literature.

== Plot ==
The narrator of the story learns through the local press about the murder of a man named Octavio Ramírez who was described as "depraved." The narrator begins to infer the reasons behind the crime and comes to the conclusion that Ramírez was murdered by the father of a male teenager whom he attempted to seduce.

== See also ==
- LGBT literature in Ecuador
- Débora, a novel by Palacio published in 1927
- Ecuadorian literature - Generation of the 30s
