= Iván Egüez =

Ecuadorian writer

Iván Égüez is an Ecuadorian writer. He was born in Quito in 1944. He has written around 20 books, but is best known for his debut novel La Linares (1975). The book marked a break with the prevailing social realist tradition of Ecuadorian literature and won the Aurelio Espinosa Pólit Prize. As the award was given by the Catholic University of Ecuador, it generated a controversy that reached the Vatican. ,

La Linares remains Eguez's most popular work, and has been through many editions and translations. The book is often associated with another novel María Joaquina en la vida y en la muerte by Jorge Dávila Vásquez, which was published the same year and which shared elements of magical realism and neo-baroque language. Davila Vasquez's novel also won the Espinosa Polit Prize the following year.

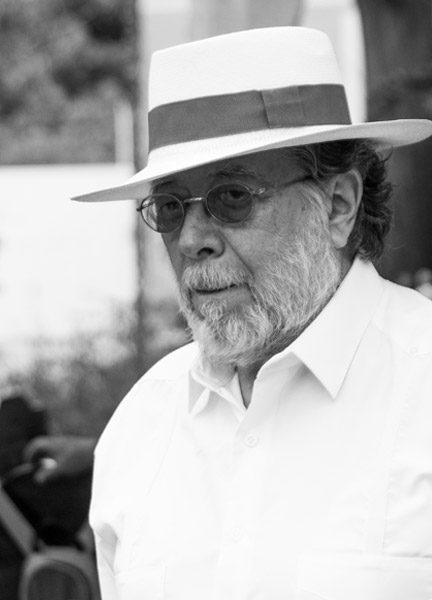
Iván Égüez is an Ecuadorian writer.
