= Alfredo Gangotena =

Ecuadorian poet

- Born: Alfredo Gangotena Fernandez Salvador; April 19, 1904; Guayaquil, Ecuador
- Died: December 23, 1944 (aged 40); Quito, Ecuador
- Occupation: Poet
- Spouse: Emma Guarderas y Gómez de La Torre
- Writing career
- Notable works: Origénie (1928), Tempestad Secreta (1940)

Alfredo Gangotena Fernandez Salvador (April 19, 1904 – December 23, 1944) was an Ecuadorian poet who wrote in French and Spanish.

== Biography ==
Alfredo Gangotena was born in Quito on April 19, 1904. He was the son of Carlos Gangotena Alvarez and Hortensia Fernández-Salvador Chiriboga, wealthy landowners in the Pichincha Province. His father died circa 1920.

Gangotena moved to Paris at the age of 16 to complete his education, eventually earning a mining engineering degree to fulfill his father's last wishes. In Paris, Jules Supervielle, Max Jacob and Jean Cocteau, with whom he had strong ties of friendship, encouraged him to publish his poetry.

Gangotena was part of a group of Latin American writers living in Paris and writing in French during first part of the 20th century. The group included the Chilean Vicente Huidobro, the Peruvian César Vallejo, and his fellow Ecuadorian Jorge Carrera Andrade. Although a native Spanish speaker, Gangotena managed to dominate the French language so well, that in 1922 the painter Max Jacob sent him a letter after reading one of his poems in a literary magazine, in which he wrote: "The Holy Spirit has blessed you. Only a short while ago you knew nothing of the French language and now many famous writers covet your marvelous use of it."

His first poetry book Origénie was published in 1928. He then accompanied Henri Michaux on a trip to Ecuador's Andes and Amazon, which lead to Michaux's book Ecuador (1929). In 1932 Gangotena returned to Quito to oversee and administer his family's business as they had money problems due to the Great Depression.

In 1936 he returned to France as the Secretary of the Ecuadorian Embassy, but he returned to Quito a year later to teach mathematics at the Central University of Ecuador.

In 1940 he published his last book Tempestad Secreta, which contains his own translation of some of his poems from French to Spanish, and includes some poems written in Spanish.

He died in Quito on December 23, 1944, after undergoing an emergency Appendectomy, at the age of 40.

== Personal life ==
In Ecuador he married Emma Guarderas y Gómez de La Torre, but their union did not last.

== Works ==
Gangotena's poetry was first translated from French to Spanish by Georges Pillement in the 1920s, and Eduardo Riofrío in 1945. Some of his poetry was also translated into Spanish by Gonzalo Escudero and Filoteo Samaniego for the book Poesía (1956; published by Casa de la Cultura Ecuatoriana). Other translators include Margarita Guarderas de Jijón, and in the 1990s Verónica Mosquera and Cristina Burneo.

Gangotena's poetry has not been translated into English.

Poetry books

- “L’Homme de Truxillo”
- “Poiere D’Angoisse”(Pera de Angustia)
- “Vaillée”
- “B’Orage Secret” (La Tempestad Secreta)
- “Ansense”
- “Chistóforus”
- “Nuit”
