= Blanca Martínez Mera =

Ecuadorian writer

Blanca Martínez Mera (October 5, 1897 – June 20, 1976) was an Ecuadorian writer and teacher. With the publication of her book En la paz del campo in 1940, she became the first woman to publish a novel in Ecuador.

== Biography ==
Blanca Martínez Mera was born in 1897 in Ambato, in Ecuador's Tungurahua province. Her parents were Rosario Mera Iturralde and Luis A. Martínez, also a well-known writer. She spent her childhood on the family hacienda known as Quinta de Atocha, but she was orphaned by age 12. She completed her secondary studies at the Colegio de la Providencia. In 1921, she married Florencio Tinajero Albornoz, with whom she would go on to have two daughters. She was sometimes known as Blanca Martínez de Tinajero.

Early in her career, she served as president of the Red Cross of Ambato. She also taught high school at Colegio Bolívar, later becoming the rector of the Instituto Manuela Cañizares in Quito. During her time as an educator she met the politician José María Velasco Ibarra, who, on becoming president of Ecuador, named her vice consul in Boston. He later named her director of education for her home province of Tungurahua.

In 1940, Martínez Mera published the costumbrista novel En la paz del campo, the first novel published by an Ecuadorian woman. She went on to publish two more novels: Purificación (1942) and Luz en la noche (1950).

Later in life she became the director of the Casa de Montalvo, a museum and cultural center in Ambato, whose eponymous magazine she edited for many years.

Martínez Mera died in Ambato in 1976. She is buried in the Nuestra Señora de La Merced Municipal Cemetery. A school in her hometown bears her name in honor of her memory.

== Selected works ==
- En la paz del campo (1940)
- Purificación (1942)
- Luz en la noche (1950)
