= Jorge Velasco Mackenzie =

Ecuadorian writer (1949–2021)

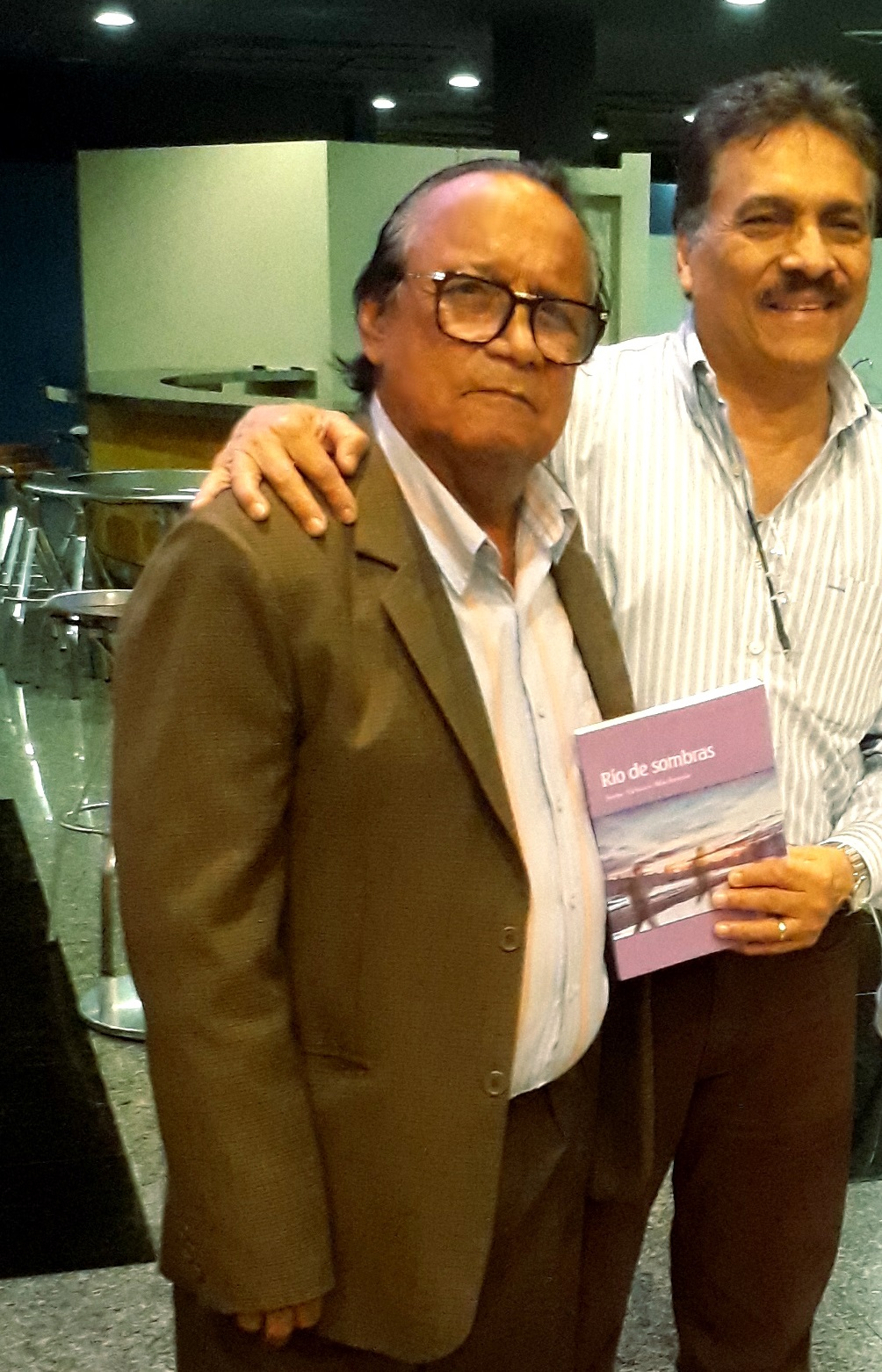
Velasco Mackenzie in 2018

Jorge Eduardo Velasco Mackenzie (16 January 1949 – 24 September 2021) was an Ecuadorian writer and professor. His most popular novel is El rincón de los justos (1983) about Guayaquil's lumpen proletariat.

== Literary career ==
In 1975 Velasco Mackenzie published his first book, the collection of stories De vuelta al paraíso. In 1983 he published his first novel El rincón de los justos.

During the 1980s he gave several cultural promotional workshops sponsored by the Central Bank of Ecuador with Miguel Donoso Pareja, whom he had met after participating in a literary workshop in which Velasco developed the text of his novel about the Afro-Ecuadorian people. Tambores para una canción perdida (1986), with which he won the "Grupo de Guayaquil" Award, organized by the House of Ecuadorian Culture and whose jury was made up of Alfredo Pareja Díez Canseco, Antonio Cornejo Polar and Eliécer Cárdenas. Velasco and Donoso remained friends until Donoso's death.

In 1996 he won first place in the IV Biennial of the Ecuadorian Novel with the historical novel En nombre de un amor imaginario, in which he fictionalizes the events surrounding the French Geodesic Mission of 1736.

His novel La casa del fabulante (2014), recounts his experience in a detoxification center, which he attended due to his problems with alcoholism.

== Bibliography ==
=== Novels ===
- El rincón de los justos (1983)
- Tambores para una canción perdida (1986)
- El ladrón de Levita (1990)
- En nombre de un amor imaginario (1996)
- Río de sombras (2003)
- Tatuaje de náufragos (2009)
- Hallado en la gruta (2012)
- La casa del fabulante (2014)

=== Short stories ===
- De vuelta al paraíso (1975)
- Como gato en tempestad (1977)
- Raymundo y la creación del mundo (1979)
- Músicos y amaneceres (1986)
- Clown y otros cuentos (1988)
- Desde una oscura vigilia (1992)
- La mejor edad para morir (2006)

=== Poetry ===
- Colectivo (1981)
- Algunos tambores que suenan así (1981)

=== Theater ===
- En esta casa de enfermos (1983)
