= Geraldina Guerra Garcés =

Ecuadorian campaigner against femicide (born 1975)

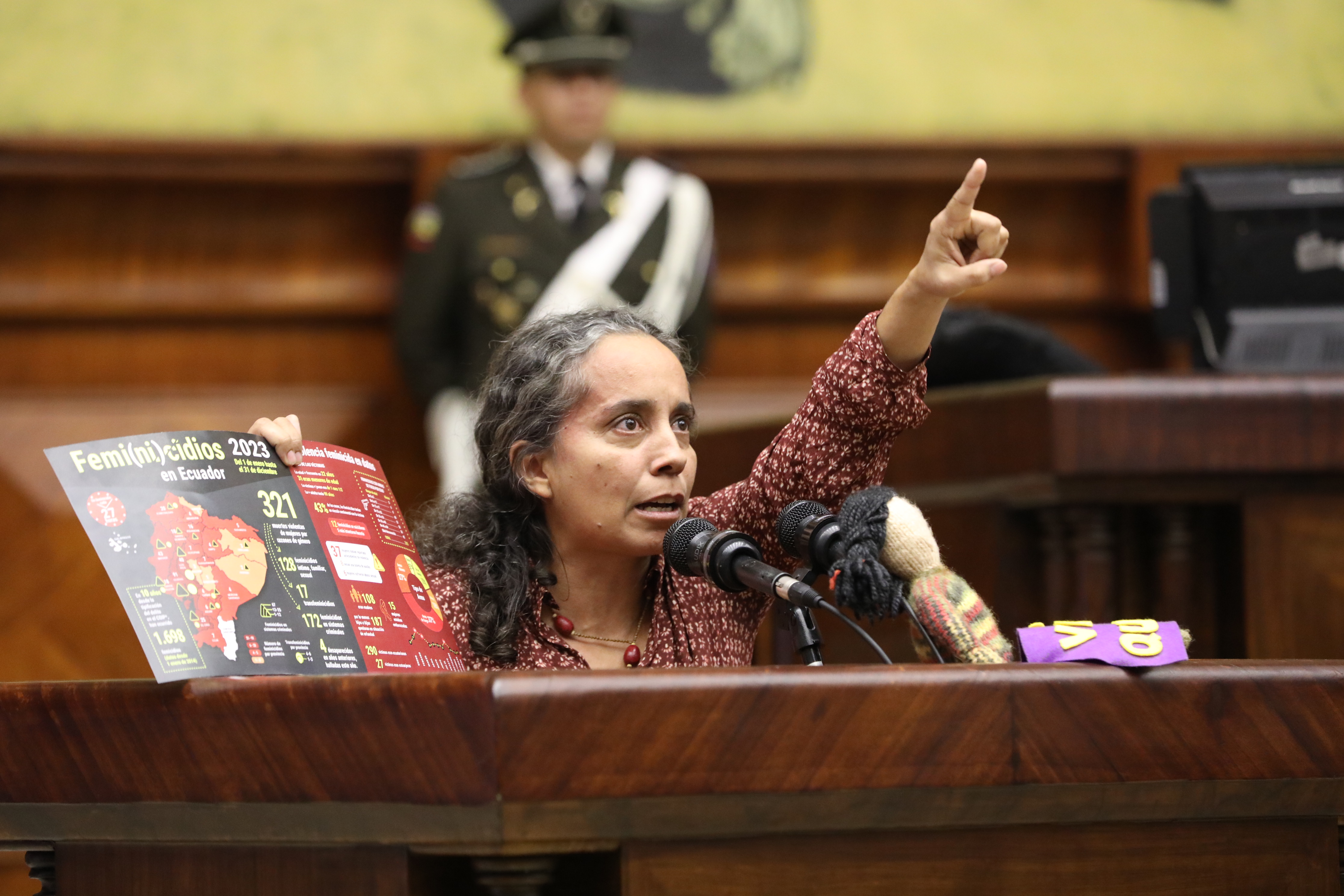
- Addressing the National Assembly in 2024
- Born: 1975 (age 50–51); Ecuador
- Education: Universidad Central del Ecuador, Latino-Americana de Ciências Sociais
- Occupations: women's rights activist and campaigner against femicide
- Years active: 1990s–present
- Employer: Latin American Association for Alternative Development (ALDEA)
- Organization(s): Feminist Alliance for Mapping Femicides in Ecuador; Latin American Network Against Gender Violence; National Network of Shelters for Victims of Gender Violence

Geraldina Guerra Garcés (born 1975) is an Ecuadorian women's rights activist and campaigner against femicide. She tracks cases and maps the lives of femicide victims, is president of the Latin American Association for Alternative Development (ALDEA) and has collaborated with other initiatives such as the Latin American Network Against Gender Violence. She was named a BBC 100 Woman in 2022.

== Biography ==
Garcés was born in Ecuador in 1975 and is based in Quito. Edmundo Guerra Vivero, a public sector unionist who founded the El Conejo corporation.

Garcés has a degree in social communication from the Universidad Central del Ecuador and a diploma in migration and development from the Latino-Americana de Ciências Sociais (Latin American Faculty of Social Sciences).

Garcés has worked as a women's right's activist for almost 20 years. She has said that “Latin America is the second deadliest region for women due to the number of femicides," with a woman becoming a victim of femicide every 23 hours.

Garcés is part of the Feminist Alliance for Mapping Femicides in Ecuador. For the Cartographies of Memory initiative, Garcés tracks cases and maps the lives of femicide victims, aiming to increase the visibility of the crime in Ecuador. The campaign was featured in a BBC World Service documentary in 2022.

Garcés is also president of the Latin American Association for Alternative Development (ALDEA). She has collaborated with other initiatives such as the Latin American Network Against Gender Violence and is the public face of the National Network of Shelters for Victims of Gender Violence in Ecuador. She has organised annual marches and educational campaigns to raising awareness and put pressure on the government to adopt more comprehensive measures to prevent femicide.

Garcés was named a BBC 100 Woman in 2022. For her activism, she has been targeted by smear campaigns and has received threats.
