= El chulla Romero y Flores =

Ecuadorian novel by Jorge Icaza

El Chulla Romero y Flores is a 1958 novel by the Ecuadorian writer Jorge Icaza (1906–1978).

The book explores mestizo cultural identity. The protagonist, Romero y Flores, is conflicted between identifying with either his father's Spanish descent or his mother's Amerindian origins. Once he attains a balance of identity, he finds the tranquility he has been searching for.

The book has been translated into many languages, including Czech, German, and French, among others. It has not yet been translated into English.

== Criticism ==
While Icaza's 1934 novel Huasipungo (English trans: The Villagers, 1964) is his most famous work, many literary experts, such as Theodore Alan Sackett in El arte en la novelística de Jorge Icaza (1974), have hailed El chulla Romero y Flores as his masterpiece.

== Chulla meaning ==
The word "chulla" means the single unit of a pair. When applied to a person, a chulla is a bachelor or bachelorette, or an older single man or woman who does not have the habits of a family woman/man. In this story, the chulla is a middle-class man of mixed European and Amerindian descent who scorns his Amerindian side while exalting his European side and is preoccupied with maintaining the appearance of status and social success.

Considering "chulla," an antonomasia of Ecuador, Claude Couffon titled his 1993 French translation "L'homme de Quito" (The Man from Quito).

Chulla's origin comes from the Quichua language, which means: Alone. Odd.

== Film ==
El chulla Romero y Flores was made into a TV movie in 1995 for Ecuavisa. It was filmed in Ecuador and directed by Carl West. The story takes place in 1950s Ecuador and narrates the activities of the chulla Luis Alfonso Romero y Flores, his job as a bureaucrat, bohemian nights spent among friends, and his romance with Rosario Santacruz.
