= Jacinto de Evia =

Ecuadorian poet

- Born: 1629; Guayaquil, Ecuador
- Died: Unknown
- Occupations: Writer, Priest

Jacinto de Evia was born in Guayaquil in 1629 and died at the beginning of the 18th century. Along with Juan Bautista Aguirre (1725–1786) he is acknowledged as one of the first poets from Ecuador.

== Works ==
- "Ramillete de Varias Flores Poéticas" (1675)
- "La Gitana al Niño Jesús"
- "Romance Pastoril"
- "El Sueño de Cielo"
- "A la Temprana Muerte de Don Baltasar Carlos, Príncipe de España"
- "A la Desaparición de la Reina Doña Isabel de Borbón"
