= Aurelio Espinosa Pólit =

Ecuadorian writer, poet, literary critic and university professor

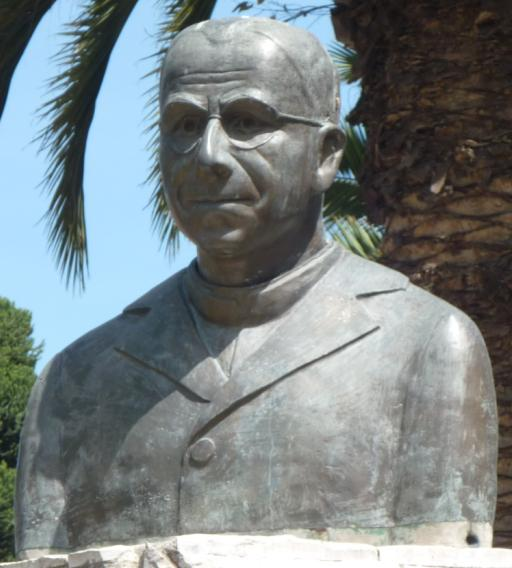
- Statue of Aurelio Espinosa Pólit in front of the Pontifical Catholic University of Ecuador
- Born: July 11, 1894; Quito, Ecuador
- Died: February 21, 1961 (aged 66)
- Occupations: Writer, Poet, Professor, Priest

Aurelio Espinosa Pólit (Quito, July 11, 1894 – February 21, 1961) was an Ecuadorian writer, poet, literary critic, and university professor. He co-founded the Pontifical Catholic University of Ecuador, and he founded the Aurelio Espinosa Polit Museum and Library in Quito.

He was a Jesuit priest, in the religious order Society of Jesus. He worked on more than 600 pieces and books in his lifetime, and was a renowned translator. He translated into Spanish the complete works of the Latin poets Virgil and Horacio and the Greek playwright Sophocles. He was the first rector of the Pontifical Catholic University, where he also taught Greek language and Greek literature. He was well-versed in Latin and Greek, and spoke English, French, Spanish, and Italian fluently.

The Aurelio Espinosa Pólit Prize, a leading literary prize in Ecuador, is named after him.

== Works ==
Essays

- Virgilio, el poeta y su misión providencial (Quito, 1932)
- Sófocles. Edipo Rey en verso castellano (Quito, 1935–1945)
- Dieciocho clases de literatura (Quito, 1947)
- El Lebrel del Cielo de Francis Thompson. Semblanza, versión poética y comentario (Quito, 1948)
- Posiciones católicas en educación (Quito, 1953)
- Temas ecuatorianos (Quito, 1954)
- Gramática Latina y escritos complementarios (Quito, 1958)
- Curso de cultura superior religiosa (Quito, 1958)
- Los dos primeros poetas coloniales ecuatorianos, siglos XVII y XVIII: Antonio de Bastidas y Juan Bautista Aguirre (Puebla, 1959)
- Síntesis virgiliana (Quito, 1960)
- Epistolario de José Joaquín de Olmedo (Puebla, 1960)
- Poesía y prosa de José Joaquín de Olmedo (Puebla, 1960)
- Los jesuitas quiteños del extrañamiento (Puebla, 1960)
- Bucólicas, Geórgicas y Eneida. (México, 1961)
- Trozos selectos de autores ecuatorianos (Quito, 1962).
- La Cooperación de los padres en la educación
- Los Clásicos de la Literatura ecuatoriana
- La dicha en que vivimo (1940)
- Formación de la Juventud (1947)
- Dieciocho clases de Literatura (1947)
- Reseña histórica del Himno Nacional Ecuatoriano (1948)
- El Himno Nacional de Juan León Mera
- Olmedo en la Historia y en las Letras
- Edición crítica de la vida de Santa Mariana de Jesús del P. Jacinto Moran de Butrón
- Santa Mariana de Jesús, hija de la Compañía de Jesús, estudio histórico ascético de su espiritualidad
- Alzando el velo del silencio, vida meditada, de San José
- José María Egas, una voz renovada en la poesía ecuatoriana (1963
- Eminente promotor de las obras del mejor poeta ambiental, sacerdotal y humano del Ecuador el Dr. Carlos Suarez Veintimilla.

Translations

- Virgilio en verso castellano
- Siete poesías sagradas de Florence Bennett Anderson (1937)

Poetry

- Del mismo laúd (1914)
- Alma adentro (1938)
- Estaciones y cristofanías (1944)
- La fuente intermitente (1946).

Biography

- Olmedo en la historia y en las letras. Siete estudios (Quito, 1955)
- Santa Mariana de Jesús, hija de la Compañía de Jesús (Quito, 1956)
