= Lupe Rumazo =

Ecuadorian writer (born 1933)

Lupe Rumazo Cobo (born October 14, 1933) is an Ecuadorian writer. She is the author of 11 books of essays, short stories and novels.

Cobo was born in Quito, the daughter of Ecuadorian historian Alfonso Rumazo González. Her books have been prologued by authors such as Ernesto Sábato, Juana de Ibarbourou, and Benjamín Carrión. She is a member of the Ecuadorian Academy of Language, the House of Ecuadorian Culture, and the Circle of Venezuelan Writers. She resides in Venezuela.

== Personal life ==
In 1956 she married the notable violinist Gerardo Alzamora Vela, the Director the Music Conservatory of Quito, who she had met in Colombia.

== Works ==
- En el lagar (1961)
- Sílabas de la tierra (Cuentos) (1964)
- Yunques y crisoles americanos (ensayos) (1967)
- Rol beligerante (ensayo) (2003)
- Carta larga sin final (1978)
- Peste blanca, peste negra (Novela) (1988)
- Vivir en el exilio, tallar en nubes (1992)
- Escalera de piedra
- Los Marcapasos (2011)
- Documentos prescindibles e imprescindibles y Temporal
- Vida y Obra de Alfonso Rumazo González
