= José María Egas =

Ecuadorian poet (1896–1982)

José María Egas (Manta, 1896 - 1982) was an Ecuadorian poet. Many of his poems were turned into the lyrics of "pasillos". Egas studied law at the University of Guayaquil graduated in 1927. He was then active as a lawyer and journalist, but became best known for his poetry, being appointed national poet laureate in 1976. He served as a professor at the University of Guayaquil. He was the brother of the poet Hugo Mayo.

== Biography ==
Born in Manta (Manabí province), he was the son of don Carlos Egas Rodriguez and doña Rosalia Miranda Alarcón. He grows in a very well educated family present in Ecuador since the century XVII for his father part.

== Works ==
- Poesía: Unción (1923)
- Unción y otros poemas (1941)
- El milagro (1941); Unción
- El milagro y Otros poemas (1954)
- Canto a Guayaquil (1960)
- Poesías completas (Guayaquil, 1982. 2da. Ed)

In anthologies:

- Indice de la poesía ecuatoriana contemporánea (Santiago de Chile, 1937)
- Otros modernistas (Guayaquil, s.f.)
- Poesía viva del Ecuador (Quito, 1990)
- La palabra perdurable (Quito, 1991)
- Poesía modernista ecuatoriana (Quito, 1991).
