= Hugo Mayo =

Ecuadorian poet

- Born: Miguel Augusto Egas Miranda; November 24, 1895; Manta, Ecuador
- Died: April 5, 1988 (aged 92); Guayaquil, Ecuador
- Occupation: Poet
- Writing career
- Pen name: Hugo Mayo
- Genre: Avant-garde
- Notable work: El zaguán de aluminio (1982)

Miguel Augusto Egas Miranda, better known by his pen name Hugo Mayo (November 24, 1895 in Manta – April 5, 1988 in Guayaquil), was an Ecuadorian avant-garde poet. He was the older brother of the poet José María Egas (1896–1982).

Although he wrote most of his poetry while living in Guayaquil, he published most of his poetry outside of Ecuador, so he was not well known in his native country, but was regarded as one of the best poets of his time in other countries such as Argentina and Peru.

His most celebrated book is El zaguán de aluminio, which was first written in 1921 but published in 1982. The book was supposed to be published in 1922 but the only copy was misplaced or stolen from the publishing house. In the intro notes of the 1982 version, he wrote: "The actual originals of El zaguán de aluminio were lost a long time ago. What I remember most about those poems are here. If some hypocritical reader has a copy of those old verses, may he forgive me if I am untrue, it is a thing of memory, of gone-by years, and of destiny."

The Princeton Encyclopedia of Poetry and Poetics calls Hugo Mayo "one of the most influential figures of the 20th century."

== Pen name ==
He adopted the pen name "Hugo Mayo" in 1921 and remained with that name for the rest of his life. The word "Hugo" was for "Victor Hugo," of whom he was a great admirer, and the word "Mayo" was for May, the month of spring in Europe.

== Works ==
- El regreso (1973)
- Poemas de Hugo Mayo (1976)
- El zaguán de aluminio (1982)
- Chamarasca (1984)
- Colección la rosa de papel (1986)
