= Jacinto Collahuazo =

Quichuan poet and historian

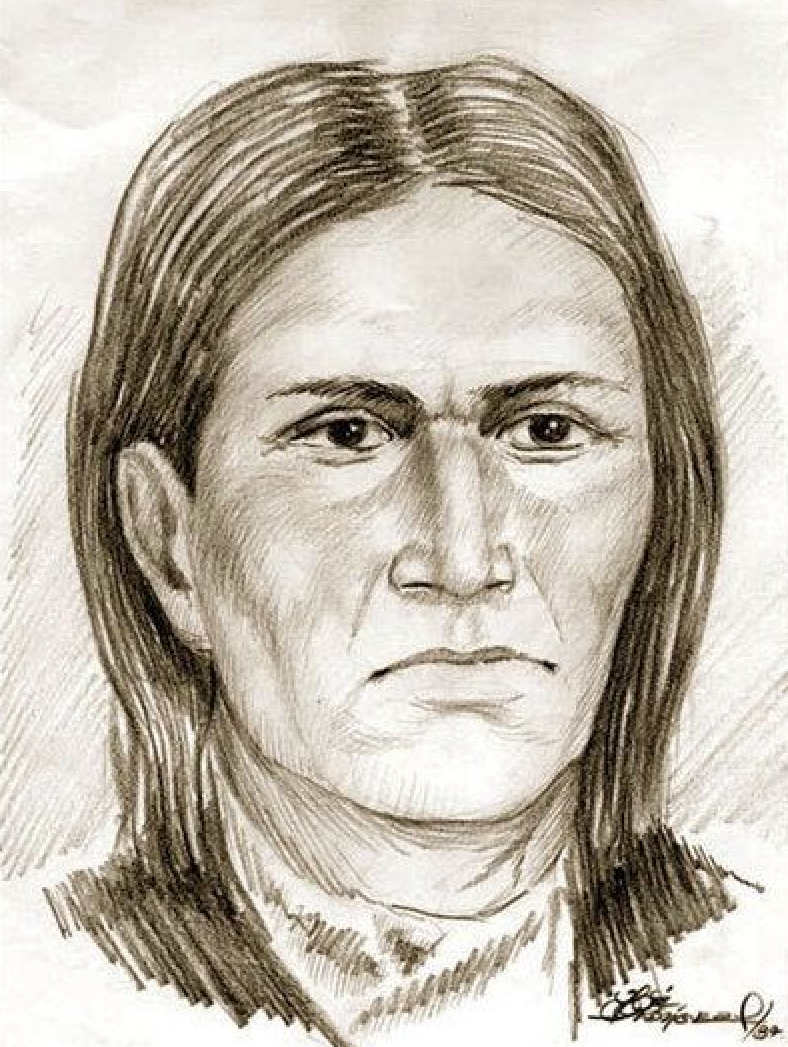
A portrait of Jacinto Collahuazo

Jacinto Collahuazo (born c. 1670; lived past the age of 80, but exact date of death is unknown) was a cacique of Otavalo, Ecuador. He was a Quichuan poet and historian. He was imprisoned by the Spanish for writing a book in Quechua about the war between Huascar and Atahualpa titled History of the civil wars of Atahualpa and his brother Atoco, known commonly as Huascar Inca. Collahuazo learned to read and write in Spanish, but his work was written in Quechua.

The Spanish magistrate of Ibarra could not accept the notion that a native could read and write, or write knowledgeably about history. He ordered Collahuazo arrested, mandated that he destroy his work in public, and sent him to prison where he would spend his final days. In 1708, Collahuazo fulfilled the mandate and burned all of his work publicly. The existence of his literary work came to light centuries later, when a crew of masons restoring the walls of a colonial church in Quito found a hidden manuscript. The salvaged fragment is a Spanish translation from Quechua of the "Elegy to the Dead of Atahualpa", a poem written by Collahuazo that describes the sadness and impotence felt by the Inca people having lost their king Atahualpa.
