= Luis A. Martínez =

Ecuadorian writer, painter, politician and agriculturist

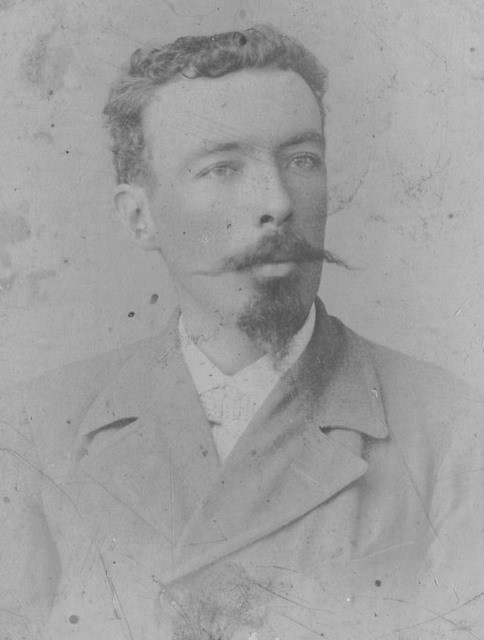
Luis A. Martinez around 1890

Luis Alfredo Martínez Holguín (June 23, 1869 in Ambato – November 26, 1909) was an Ecuadorian writer, painter, politician, and agriculturist. He introduced Realism into Ecuadorian literature. He was an opponent of the government of Eloy Alfaro. He worked in different regions and at various jobs, from the humblest to the most prestigious, and knew about the life of the people, which allowed him to write his masterpiece, A la Costa (1904), one of Ecuador's first realist novels, describing faithfully the social changes taking place in his country in the late nineteenth century.

In addition to a literary career, he fought against the liberal guerrillas in the 1890s, managed the Valdez sugar mill and was sub-secretary and Minister of Education. He also promoted construction of a railway between Ambato and the Ecuadorian Amazon which could not be completed. He wrote a treatise on agriculture and one in defense of the indigenous people of Ecuador.

Martínez was also a painter. During his lifetime he had a critically acclaimed exhibition of his paintings in Buenos Aires and one of his paintings was awarded Honorable Mention in a contest in Chicago. Some of his best paintings are now housed outside Ecuador. Two are in the United States Library of Congress, two in the Modern Art section of the Vatican Museum, and one is in Rio de Janeiro, Brazil.

Martínez died on November 26, 1909, at the age of 40, and is buried at the Municipal Cemetery of Ambato.

== Personal ==
In 1896 Martínez married Rosario Mera Iturralde, the daughter of the writer Juan León Mera (1832–1894). They had two children, Blanca Martínez Mera de Tinajero, and Edmundo Martínez Mera.

== Works ==
Books

- A la costa (1904)
- Disparates y caricaturas (1903)
- La Agricultura ecuatoriana (1903)
- Catecismo de la agricultura
- Camino al Oriente

Paintings

- Soledad Eterna
- Requiem
