= Eliécer Cárdenas =

Ecuadorian novelist (1950–2021)

Eliécer Cárdenas Espinosa
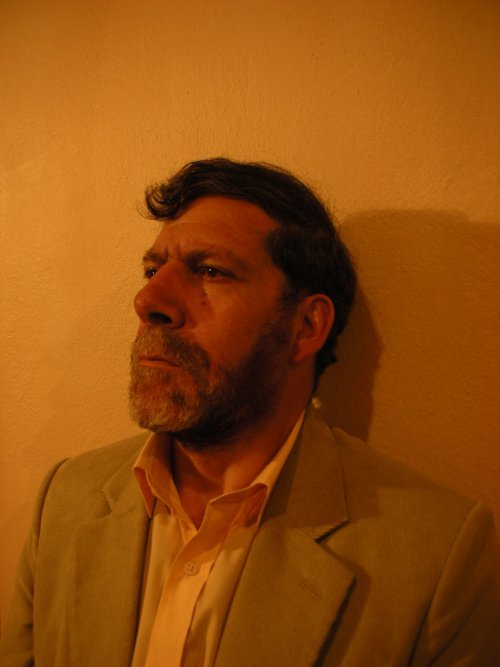
- Born: Eliécer Cárdenas Espinosa; 10 December 1950
- Died: 26 September 2021 (aged 70)
- Citizenship: Ecuador
- Education: Central University of Ecuador
- Occupation: Writer
- Writing career
- Genres: Novel, short story
- Literary movement: Latin American literature, Post-Boom

Eliécer Cárdenas Espinosa (Cañar, 10 December 1950 – 26 September 2021) was an Ecuadorian novelist.

== Life and career ==
In his youth he went from school to school because he questioned the repressive systems and was suspended various times. For example, he attended meetings of the Young Socialists, with whom he fought against the Ministry of Education for free college enrollments, and he was arrested in 1970 during the dictatorship of Velasco Ibarra.

In 1976 he graduated from the School of Jurisprudence of the Central University of Ecuador with a degree in Social Sciences. In Cuenca he married Carmen Patiño Ullauri.

From 1977 to 1978 he wrote the novel Polvo y ceniza (Dust and Ashes), which he entered into a novel contest held by the House of Ecuadorian Culture for writers under 40, and he won first prize. The book, published in 1979, is the most sold novel in Ecuador. The novel put Cárdenas in the pinnacle of Ecuadorian narrative in the 1980s. In 1991 he was elected the president of the Azuay branch of the House of Ecuadorian Culture, and he won Third Prize at the National Biennial Novel Contest with his novel Que te perdone el viento (May the Wind Forgive You).

== Works ==
=== Novels ===
- Juego de Mártires (1976)
- Polvo y ceniza (1979) Winner, Novel Contest for Writers Under 40 by the House of Ecuadorian Culture
- Del silencio profundo (1980)
- Siempre se mira el cielo (1985)
- Las Humanas Certezas (1986)
- Morir en Vilcabamba (1988) Winner of the Espinosa Pólit Prize
- Los diamantes y los hombres de provecho (1989)
- Diario de un idólatra (1990)
- Una silla para Dios : (novela) (1997)
- El oscuro final del Porvenir (2000)
- Las innumerables tribus de los muertos: novela (2004)
- El viaje de Padre Trinidad (2005)
- Raffles manos de seda: (la leyenda de un bandido): novela (2008)
- El árbol de los quemados: novela (2008)
- La extraña dama inglesa: novela de misterio (2009)
- El pinar de Segismundo (2013)
- El héroe del brazo inerte (2013)
- El enigma de la foto partida: (novela) (2013)
- Las antiguas mañanas (2015)

=== Theater ===
- Morir en Vilcabamba : teatro (1998)

=== Chronicle ===
- Guerra y paz en Paquisha (1981)

=== Short-stories ===
- Hoy, al general ... Cuentos (1971)
- La incompleta hermosura : relatos (1996)
- El ejercicio y otros cuentos (2004)
- Relatos del día libre : cuentos (2004)

=== Articles ===
- Háblanos, Bolívar (1983)
- Del silencio profundo (1986)
