= Centro Cultural Metropolitano =

Coordinates: 0.2204°S 78.5132°W

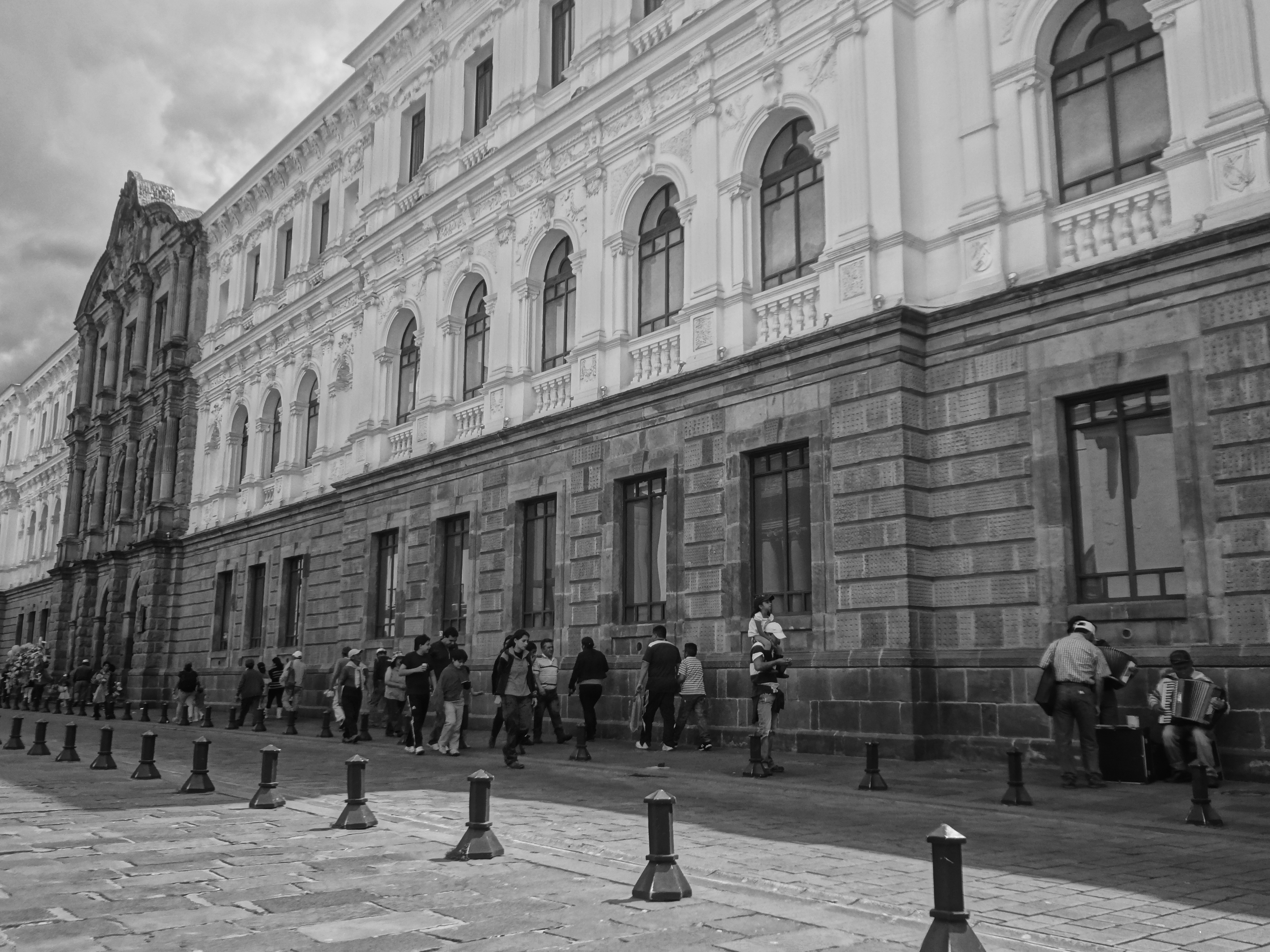
Metropolitan Cultural Center

Centro Cultural Metropolitano (English: Metropolitan Cultural Center) is a cultural institution based in Quito, Ecuador. It was established in 1997 in a building which dates to 1622.

This building belongs to the colonial epoch, but its facade was rebuilt in the 20th century. The First Central University was in this building. It also was a jail where Spanish authorities executed insurgents during the Ecuadorian War of Independence.

== See also ==
- List of buildings in Quito
- List of Jesuit sites
