= A la costa =

Ecuadorian novel by Luis A. Martinez

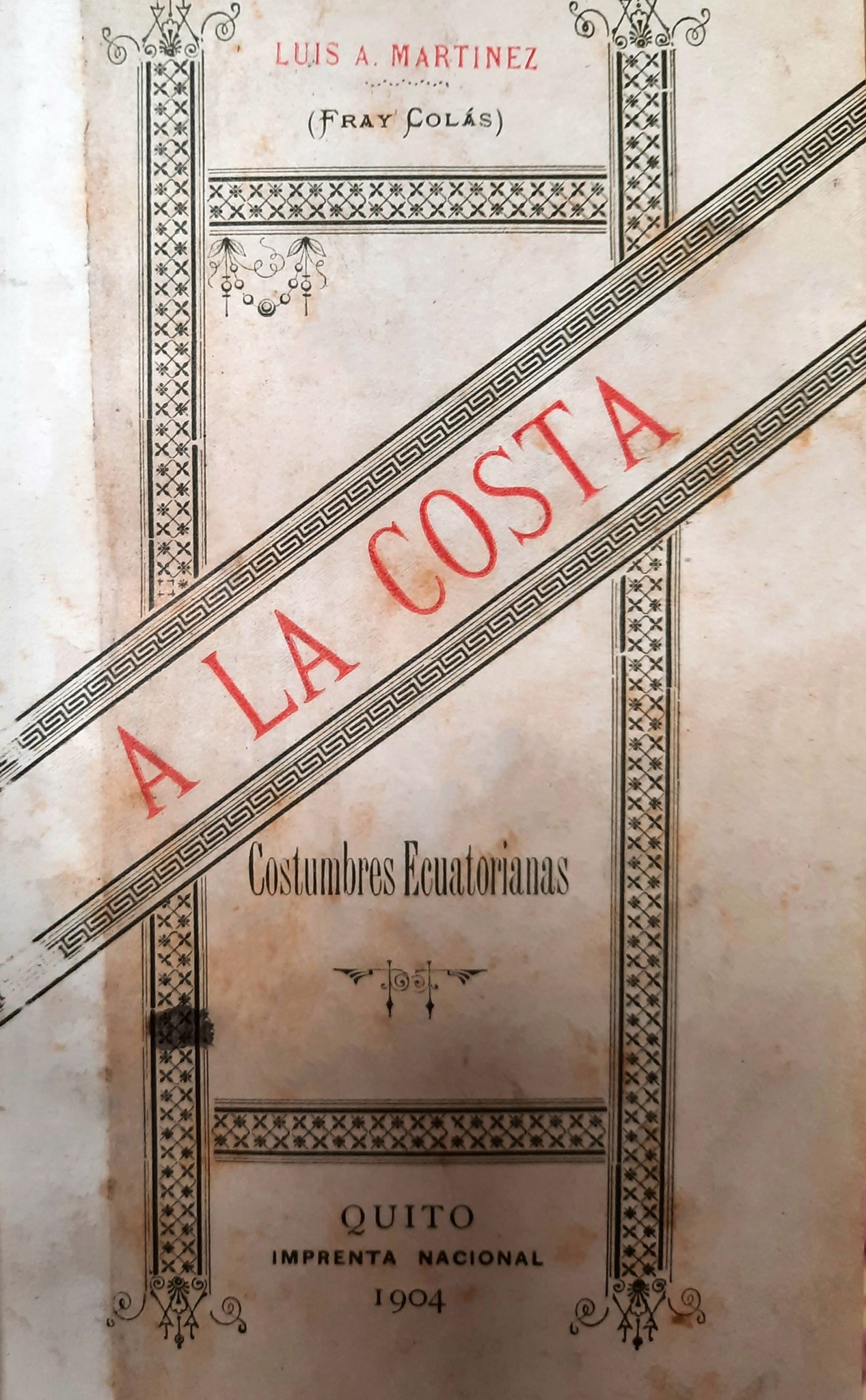
First edition, 1904

A la costa is a 1904 novel by Ecuadorian politician and writer Luis A. Martínez. It is one of the leading Ecuadorian works on social and political commentary, and an insight into the history at the time. The novel covers a series of issues, including political conflict between liberals and conservatives and social identity, economic differences between the mountainous regions and the coast and between plantation workers and urbanites, and prostitution. It reflects on the overall meaning of life.
