= Jorge Icaza Coronel =

Ecuadorian writer (1906–1978)

- Born: July 10, 1906; Quito, Ecuador
- Died: May 26, 1978 (aged 71); Quito, Ecuador
- Occupation: Writer
- Spouse: Marina Moncayo
- Children: Fenia Cristina Icaza Moncayo
- Writing career
- Pen name: Jorge Icaza
- Genre: Social Realism
- Notable works: Huasipungo (1934), El chulla Romero y Flores (1958)

Signature
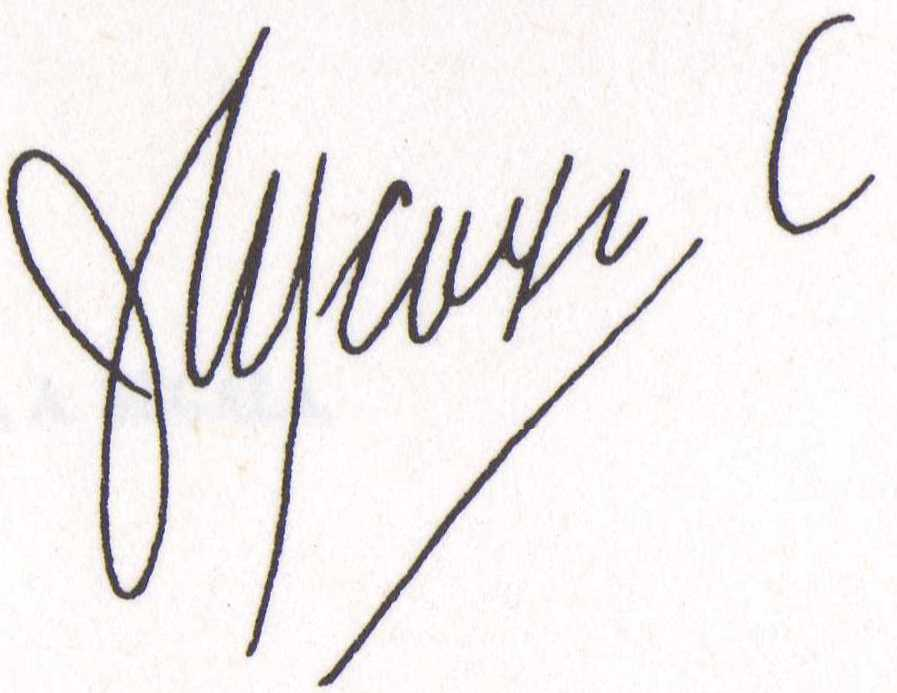

Jorge Icaza Coronel (July 10, 1906 – May 26, 1978), commonly referred to as Jorge Icaza, was a writer from Ecuador, best known for his novel Huasipungo, which brought attention to the exploitation of Ecuador's indigenous people by Ecuadorian whites.

He was born in Quito in 1906 and died of cancer in the same city in 1978.

== Career ==
=== Playwright ===
Jorge Icaza's literary career began as a playwright. His plays include El Intruso in 1928, La Comedia sin Nombre in 1929, Cuál es in 1931, Sin Sentido in 1932, and Flagelo, which was published in 1936. After his 1933 playscript, El Dictador, was censured, Icaza turned his attention to writing novels about the social conditions in Ecuador, particularly the oppression suffered by its indigenous people.

=== Novelist ===
With the publication of Huasipungo in 1934, Icaza achieved international fame. The book became a well-known "Indigenist" novel, a movement in Latin American literature that aspired to realism in its depiction of the mistreatment of the indigenous. Fragments of the book first appeared in English translation in Russia, where it was welcomed enthusiastically by Russia's peasant socialist class. Jorge Icaza was later appointed Ecuador's ambassador to Russia.

The first complete edition of Huasipungo was translated into English in 1962 by Mervyn Savill and published in England by Dennis Dobson Ltd. An "authorized" translation appeared in 1964 by Bernard H. Dulsey, and was published in 1964 by Southern Illinois University Press in Carbondale, IL as "The Villagers".

His other books include Sierra (1933), En las calles (1936), Cholos (1938), Media vida deslumbrados (1942), Huayrapamushcas (1948), Seis relatos (1952), El chulla Romero y Flores (1958), and Atrapados (1973). Although the latter two books are recognized as Icaza's greatest literary achievements by experts (such as Theodore Alan Sackett), Huasipungo continues to be his most popular book and has been translated to over 40 languages.

== Impact ==
Jorge Icaza and Huasipungo are often compared to John Steinbeck and his Grapes of Wrath from 1939, as both are works of social protest. Besides the first edition of 1934, Huasipungo went through two more editions or complete rewritings in Spanish, 1934, 1953, 1960, the first of which was difficult for even natives of other Hispanic countries to read and the last the definitive version. This makes it difficult for the readers to ascertain which version they are reading.

Besides being an "indigenista" novel, Huasipungo has also been considered a proletarian novel, and that is because Latin America had to substitute the Indians for the European working class as a model or character of proletarian literature.

Icaza became internationally popular based upon his publications, and was invited to many colleges in the United States to give lectures on the problems of the indigenous people of Ecuador.

== Works ==
Year of Publication	Literary work	Genre
1931	¿Cuál es? y Como ellos quieren	Theatre
1931	Sin sentido	Theatre
1933	Barro de la sierra	Short Stories
1934	Huasipungo	Novel
1935	En las calles	Novel
1936	Flagelo	Theatre
1937	Cholos	Novel
1942	Media vida deslumbrados	Novel
1948	Huairapamushcas	Novel
1958	El chulla Romero y Flores	Novel
1961	Obras escogidas	
1969	Relatos	Short stories
1972	Atrapados	Novel
