= Huasipungo =

Huasipungo (hispanicized spelling from Kichwa wasipunku or wasi punku, wasi house, punku door, "house door") is a 1934 novel by Jorge Icaza (1906-1978) of Ecuador.

Huasipungo became a well-known "Indigenist" novel, a movement in Latin American literature that preceded Magical Realism and emphasized brutal realism.

Huasipungo is often compared to John Steinbeck's Grapes of Wrath from 1939, as both are works of social protest. Besides the first edition of 1934, Huasipungo went through two more editions or complete rewritings in Spanish, 1934, 1953, 1960, the first of which was difficult for even natives of other Hispanic countries to read and the last the definitive version.

Besides being an "indigenist" novel, Huasipungo has also been considered a proletarian novel, in that Latin America had to substitute the Indians for the working class as a model or character of proletarian literature.

Huasipungo has been translated into over 40 languages, including English, Italian, French, German, Dutch, Portuguese, Czech, Polish, and Russian.

== English translation ==
Fragments of the book first appeared in English translation in Russia, where it was welcomed enthusiastically by Russia's peasant socialist class.

The complete edition of Huasipungo was first translated into the English language in 1962 by Mervyn Savill and published in England by Dennis Dobson Ltd. An "authorized" translation appeared in 1964 by Bernard H. Dulsey, and was published in 1964 by Southern Illinois University Press in Carbondale, IL as The Villagers.

== Etymology ==
A wasipunku (the term transliterated into huasipungo) was a parcel of land of an hacienda given to the indigenous people in exchange for their labor on the hacienda rather than monetary remuneration. In a typical wasipunku the people built huts and used the surrounding land to cultivate food.

== Characters ==
- Don Alfonso Pereira – considered a gentleman of high society in Quito.
- Doña Blanca Chanique – Pereira's wife and a matron of the church.
- Doña Lolita – Pereira's adolescent daughter.
- Uncle Julio – Pereira's powerful uncle, who has the habit of talking in plural.
- Mr. Chapy – the manager of the exploitation of wood in Ecuador; an American with great financial resources and millionaire connections abroad.
- Policarpio – the mayordomo of the Cuchitambo hacienda owned by Don Alfonso Pereira.
- Andrés Chiliquinga – the novel's main protagonist, an Indian in the hacienda of Don Alfonso Pereira. He heads the resistance during the eviction of the Indians from their huasipungos.
- Jacinto Quintana – a mestizo who is the teniente politico, he is a bartender and foreman. He is corrupt and authoritarian. He despises and abuses the Indians.
- Juana – Jacinto Quintana's mestiza wife, who has occasional sexual relations with Pereira and the priest.
- Gabriel Rodríguez – a one-eyed mestizo who is mean to the Indian people.
- The priest – An adulterer who gives sermons and puts fear in the hearts of the Indians in order to take advantage of them and achieve financial gain.
- Cunshi – Andrés Chiliquinga's wife, who is physically and sexually abused both by Pereira and by her own husband.
