= Gonzalo Escudero Moscoso =

Ecuadorian poet and diplomat

Gonzalo Escudero
- Born: Gonzalo Escudero Moscoco; September 28, 1903; Quito, Ecuador
- Died: December 10, 1971 (aged 68); Brussels, Belgium
- Occupations: Poet, Diplomat

Gonzalo Escudero Moscoso (September 28, 1903 – December 10, 1971) was an Ecuadorian poet and diplomat.

Escudero Moscoso was born in Quito, where he spent his high school years at the Instituto Nacional Mejía. Later, he attended the Central University of Ecuador, where he obtained his doctorate degree in jurisprudence. He was a distinguished professor of international law at the University of Quito, Secretary of Education, Secretary of Congress, and Minister of Foreign Affairs.

He served as Ecuador's ambassador to Uruguay (1942-1845), Peru (1956), Argentina (1961), Colombia (1963), Brazil (1965), UNESCO (1960) and Belgium (1971). He died in Brussels in 1971.

== Works ==
- Los Poemas del Arte (1918)
- Las Parábolas Olímpicas (1922)
- Altanoche (1947)
- Hélices de Huracán y de Sol (1933)
- Estatura del Aire (1951)
- Paralelogramo (play)
- Material del Ángel
- Autorretrato
- Introducción a la Muerte
- Hombre de América
- Dios
- Ases
- Pleamar de Piedra
- Réquiem por la Luz
- Nocturno de Septiembre
- Contrapunto
