= Biblioteca Ayacucho =

The Biblioteca Ayacucho (Ayacucho Library) is an editorial entity of the government of Venezuela, founded on September 10, 1974. It is managed by the Fundación Biblioteca Ayacucho. Its name, Ayacucho, comes from the intention to honor the definitive and crucial Battle of Ayacucho that took place on December 9, 1824, between Spain and the territories of the Americas, prior to the full independence of the continent.

From the beginning, the Biblioteca had its sights set on the classic works of all of Latin America and of all the branches of literary culture. It started with a Classical collection, with its first publication being Doctrina del Libertador Simón Bolívar, by Venezuelan independence hero Simón Bolívar, in June 1976. Over time, the Biblioteca has developed several collections, as well as one of the most important Literary Dictionaries of Latin America, the Diccionario Enciclopédico de las Letras de América Latina.

Notable personalities of the intellectual and academic world of Latin America have participated in the formation and development of Biblioteca Ayacucho, such as Ángel Rama and José Ramón Medina. Its director, as of today, is the Venezuelan writer Luis Alberto Crespo.

In March 2009 Biblioteca Ayacucho won three categories of the fifth Premio Nacional del Libro, including the category of digital publications, for the Biblioteca Ayacucho Digital. The Biblioteca Ayacucho Digital provides free online access to around 250 Venezuelan and Latin American books, ranging from recent publications to classics by authors such as Simón Bolívar.
