= Jorge Dávila Vásquez =

Ecuadorian writer and critic

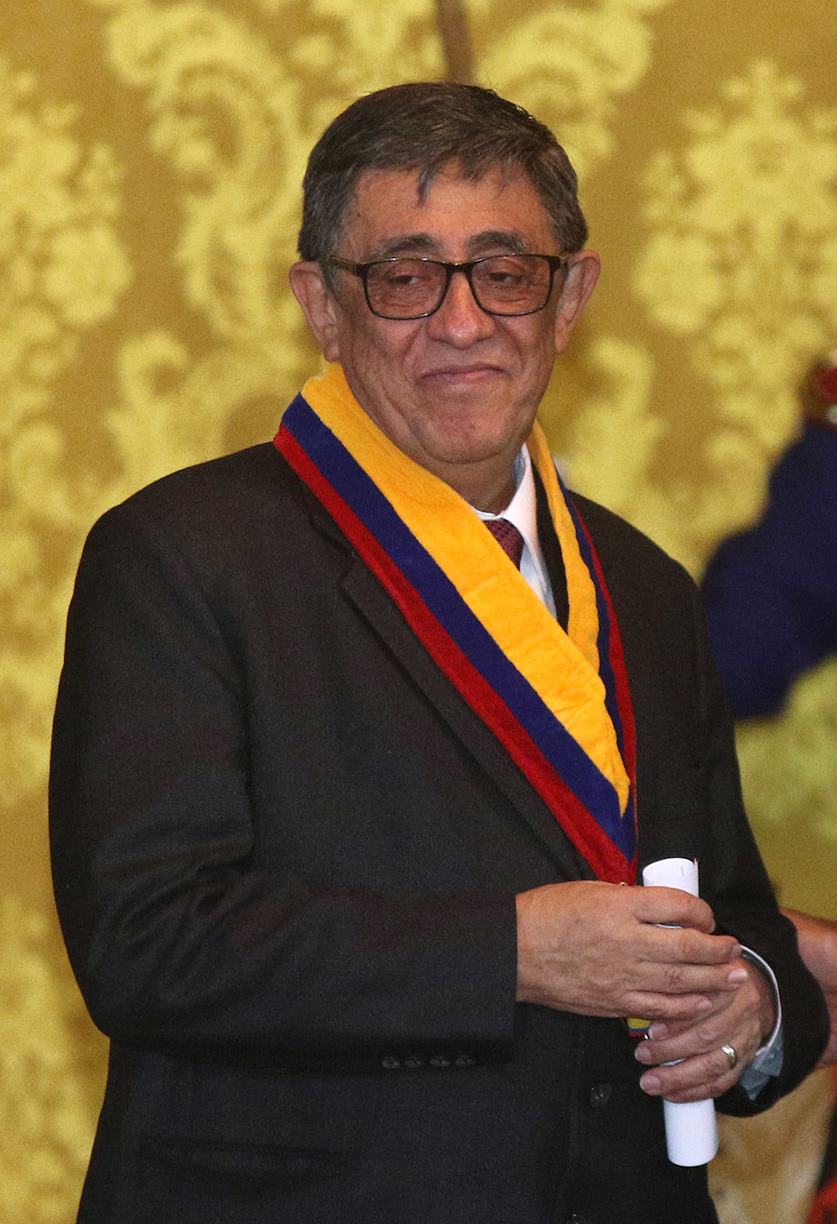
Jorge Dávila Vázquez

Jorge Dávila Vázquez is an Ecuadorian writer and critic. He was born in 1947 in Cuenca in the province of Azuay.

He studied at the Universidad de Cuenca. He grew up in a literary environment, as his uncle was the poet César Dávila Andrade. He was also interested in the stage, and was involved with an experimental theatre group in his youth. He won a scholarship to study stage direction in France in 1970/71.

His first book of poems, Nueva canción de Eurídice y Orfeo, came out in 1975. This was followed by the experimental novel María Joaquina en la vida y en la muerte (1976) and the short story collection Este mundo es el camino (1980). Both books won the Premio Aurelio Espinosa Pólit. Other noted works include Los tiempos del olvido (1977) and El libro de los sueños (2001).

In 2016, he won the Premio Nacional Eugenio Espejo in recognition of his lifelong contributions to literature.
