= Central University of Ecuador =

Public university in Quito, Ecuador (est. 1620)

Coordinates: 0.1995°S 78.5051°W

- Universidad Central del Ecuador
- Motto: Omnium potentior est sapientia
- Motto in English: Wisdom is the most powerful of all
- Type: Public
- Established: September 5, 1620; 406 years ago
- Affiliations: Red Ecuatoriana de Universidades para Investigación y Postgrados (REDU); CEDIA
- President: Patricio Espinosa del Pozo (2024– )
- Students: 29,993 (QS)
- Location: Quito, Ecuador
- Campus: Urban; main campus: Ciudadela Universitaria (Av. América)
- Website: www.uce.edu.ec (in Spanish)

The Central University of Ecuador (Spanish: Universidad Central del Ecuador) is a public university in Quito, Ecuador. By institutional lineage it is among the oldest universities in the Americas: its origin lies in the royal charter of the Jesuit Real y Pontificia Universidad de San Gregorio Magno (1620), later merged (1786–1788) with the Dominican Universidad de Santo Tomás de Aquino to form the Crown's Real y Pública Universidad de Santo Tomás. It was reorganized as the Universidad Central de Quito by the General Law on Public Education of 18 March 1826 during Gran Colombia, and adopted its current name by decree in 1836.

== History ==
=== Early foundations (1620–1836) ===
A royal cédula of 5 September 1620 authorized the Jesuit University of San Gregorio Magno in Quito; teaching began following the formal obedecimiento in 1651. In 1786–1788 the Crown approved the merger of San Gregorio with the Dominican University of Santo Tomás de Aquino (founded 1686–1688), creating the Real y Pública Universidad de Santo Tomás. Under Gran Colombia, the 1826 education law established Universidades Centrales in departmental capitals, reorganizing Quito's institution as the Universidad Central de Quito; the 1836 decree formalized the current name, Universidad Central del Ecuador.

=== Republican era and campus consolidation ===
During the nineteenth and twentieth centuries the university was intermittently intervened amid political shifts, while consolidating professional faculties (notably medicine and law) and expanding into a modern urban campus on Avenida América in northern Quito. The former colonial premises now house the Metropolitan Cultural Center.

== Academics ==
UCE offers undergraduate and graduate programs across architecture and urbanism, arts, health sciences and medicine, economics, engineering, law and political sciences, education, and the natural and social sciences. The university's integrated library system supports teaching, learning and research with discovery tools and open access services.

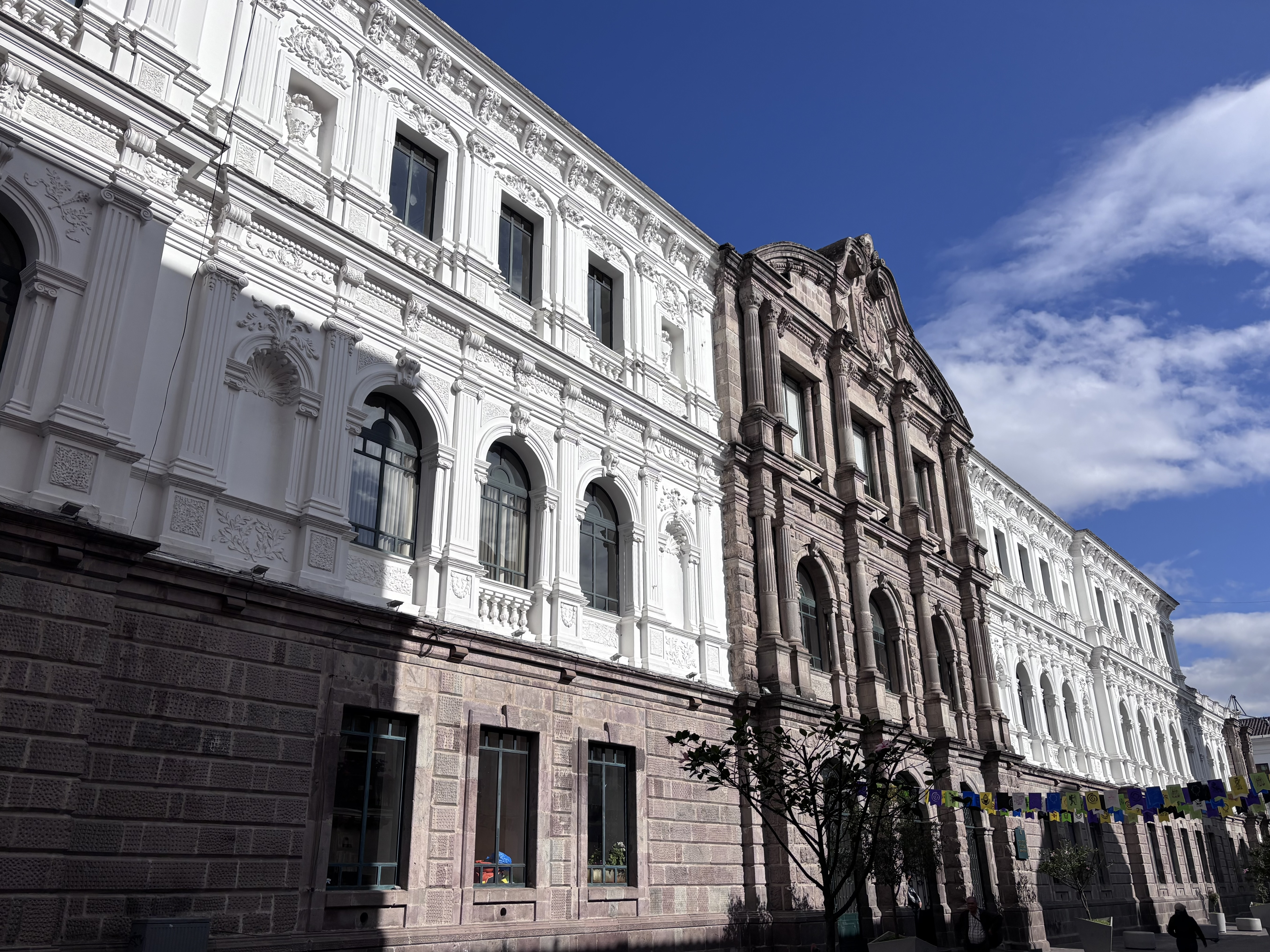
The Centro Cultural Metropolitano in Quito, housed in the former Jesuit complex that in 1620 became the Royal and Pontifical University of San Gregorio Magno, a direct antecedent of the Central University of Ecuador.

== Research, innovation and rankings ==
The Central University of Ecuador (UCE) maintains a broad research agenda supported by a centralized research office and a university-wide library and repository infrastructure. The Dirección de Investigación coordinates institutional programs and outlets such as the Investiga UCE science magazine and competitive calls for projects. The university's Sistema Integrado de Bibliotecas (SIB) and the open-access institutional repository (RI-UCE) provide discovery and preservation services for theses, articles and datasets.

Several UCE journals disseminate disciplinary research; for example, the Revista de la Facultad de Ciencias Médicas publishes peer-reviewed work in health sciences and medical education. Clinical teaching and applied research are also supported by university health facilities such as the Hospital del Día (teaching day hospital).

In global rankings, UCE appears in the QS World University Rankings (band #1201–1400 in 2025) and in the QS regional tables for Latin America and the Caribbean. In the 2025 SCImago Institutions Rankings (Universities), UCE places within Ecuador's top ten overall and ranks seventh nationally in the subject area of Education, reflecting visibility in research outputs and societal impact metrics.

At the national level, UCE reports competitive outcomes in the licensure exams administered by the higher-education quality agency (CACES) for Medicine, Dentistry and Nursing, which the university presents as evidence of academic performance in health professions education.

== Campus and transport ==
The main campus is located along Avenida América. Since 2023 the Universidad Central metro station of the Quito Metro provides direct access to the university area.

== Notable alumni and affiliates ==
- Gabriel García Moreno (1821–1875), president of Ecuador; studied law in Quito and later served as university rector.
- Jerónimo Carrión (c. 1801–1873), president of Ecuador; earned a doctorate in jurisprudence after studies in Loja, Cuenca and Quito.
- José Mejía Lequerica (1775–1813), deputy to the Cortes of Cádiz; educated in Quito's Royal and Public University of Santo Tomás.
- Eugenio Espejo (1747–1795), polymath and early public health reformer; trained in Quito (Colegio de San Fernando; medicine and later law).
- Isidro Ayora (1879–1978), president of Ecuador and physician associated with Quito's medical faculty.
- José María Velasco Ibarra (1893–1979), five-time president of Ecuador; earned a doctorate in jurisprudence at the Central University of Ecuador (1922).
- Benjamín Carrión (1897–1979), writer, diplomat and cultural promoter; studied law at the Central University of Ecuador and founded the Casa de la Cultura Ecuatoriana (1944).
- Oswaldo Guayasamín (1919–1999), painter and sculptor; trained at Quito's National School of Fine Arts and graduated as painter and sculptor (1942); the school was later incorporated into UCE's Faculty of Arts.
- Eduardo Kingman (1913–1997), painter and muralist; studied at the Escuela de Bellas Artes in Quito (precursor later integrated into UCE's Faculty of Arts).
- Pedro Vicente Maldonado (1704–1748), Enlightenment scientist and cartographer; earned a maestro en Artes degree at the University of San Gregorio (1720/1721).
- Juan de Velasco (1727–1792), Jesuit historian; studied philosophy at the Colegio Máximo and theology at the University of San Gregorio, where he obtained his doctorate in 1753.
- Jacinto Morán de Butrón (1668–1749), Jesuit philosopher and historian; professor of philosophy at the Pontifical University of San Gregorio Magno (1695).
- Juan Bautista Aguirre (1725–1786), poet and Jesuit scholar; professor of rhetoric, canon law and philosophy at the University of San Gregorio (from 1756).
- Dominique Domec (1845-1884), French surgeon who helped to establish the Ecuadorian medical school of surgery.
- Geraldina Guerra Garcés (born 1975), campaigner against femicide

== See also ==
- List of colonial universities in Latin America
- List of universities in Ecuador
