= Juan Bautista Aguirre =

- Born: 1725; Daule, Ecuador
- Died: June 15, 1786 (aged 60–61); Tivoli, Italy
- Occupation: Poet

Juan Bautista Aguirre y Carbo (Daule, Ecuador, April 11, 1725 - Tivoli, Italy, June 15, 1786) was a notable poet, writer, scientist and Jesuit from colonial South America. He is considered one of the precursors of Hispanic and Ecuadorian poetry.

== Biography ==
Aguirre was the son of the militia captain Carlos Aguirre Ponce de Solis and Teresa Carbo Cerezo, both from Guayaquil. He studied at the San Luis Seminary College in Quito, where he lived for thirty years (almost half of his life). In 1758 he entered the Society of Jesus. He made his final vows on August 15, 1758, in Quito.

Aguirre taught in Quito at the San Gregorio Magno University until the Jesuits were expelled from Spanish America in 1767. On August 20 of that year, he left South America from Guayaquil bound for Faenza, Italy, where the Jesuits of Quito had taken refuge.

Once in Italy, Aguirre was the superior of the Jesuit convent school in Ravenna and rector of the college in Ferrara.He made his final vows on August 15, 1758, in Quito. After the Order of the Jesuits was terminated by Pope Clement XIV in 1773, he settled in Rome under the papacy of Pope Pius VI. He was a friend of the bishop of Tivoli, Monsignor Gregorio Bamaba Chiaramonti, future Pope Pius VII.

Aguirre wrote poems of varying topics, including religious, moral, and love poems.

The Unidad Educativa Bilingue Javier in Guayaquil has named a library after him.
