= Galo René Pérez =

Ecuadorian writer, poet, literary critic, biographer and college teacher

Galo René Pérez Cruz (Quito, April 3, 1923 - June 18, 2008) was an Ecuadorian writer, poet, literary critic, biographer, and college teacher.

Galo René Pérez has had a lifetime of working in the literary field. He has held various posts in literary and cultural institutions of his country. He was Secretary of Public Education during the government of the former Ecuadorian President Galo Plaza, and served as Secretary General of the Council of Government. He has also been President of the House of Ecuadorian Culture and Director of the Ecuadorian Academy of Language.

== Works ==
Pérez has published 14 books in his career so far. His lectures, essays, articles, literary criticism have been collected and published for study abroad. His style, which is simple and elegant, has won him admirers the world over. The latest work is a biography of Juan Montalvo.

He was the 2004 recipient of the "Premio Eugenio Espejo" Prize in Literature, Ecuador's highest award.

== Works ==
Non-fiction

- Desvelo y vaivén (Quito, 1949)
- César Vallejo, poeta de América (Quito, 1952)
- Tornaviaje (Quito, 1960)
- Cinco rostros de la poesía: ensayos sobre Pablo Neruda, César Vallejo, Federico García Lorca, Miguel Hernández y Barba Jacob (Quito, 1960)
- Desvelo y vaivén del navegante (Quito, 1962)
- Rumbo a la Argentina (Quito, 1963)
- La viviente poesía de Whitman (Guayaquil, 1966)
- Pensamiento y literatura del Ecuador: crítica y antología (Quito, 1972)
- La novela Hispanoamericana. Historia y crítica (Quito, 1983)
- Prosa escogida (Quito, 1978)
- Confesión insobornable (Quito, 1987)

Poetry

- Poemas de octubre (Quito, 1946)

Biography

- Un escritor entre la gloria y las borrascas: vida de Juan Montalvo (Madrid, 1991)
- Manuela Sáenz, una mujer total (Quito, 1997).
