= LGBTQ literature in Ecuador =

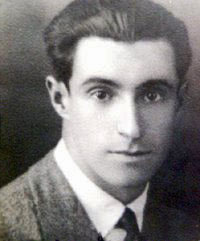
Pablo Palacio, author of The Man Who Was Kicked to Death.

LGBT literature in Ecuador, defined as literature written by Ecuadorian authors that involves plots, themes or characters that are part of or are related to sexual diversity, had its earliest exponent in the short story The Man Who Was Kicked to Death, published in 1926 by Pablo Palacio, became the first Ecuadorian literary work to openly address homosexuality.

Throughout the twentieth century, several authors reflected the religious and cultural conceptions of the time, which is why the representation of LGBT characters often had negative connotations or tragic endings, especially considering that homosexuality was decriminalized in Ecuador in 1997. A gradual change in these representations took place at the end of the 20th century and was accentuated in the early years of the 21st century, with the first Ecuadorian novels to portray same-sex love relationships in a positive light, in particular Salvo el calvario and Eses fatales, both published in 2005.

In recent years, several Ecuadorian literary works with LGBT themes have achieved critical success and received national and international recognition, including novels such as Pequeños palacios en el pecho (2014), by Luis Borja Corral, Gabriel(a) (2019), by Raúl Vallejo, and some works by Mónica Ojeda.

== Narrative ==
=== First representations ===
The earliest documented literary representation of characters or themes related to homosexuality in Ecuador dates back to 1926, in the short story The Man Who Was Kicked to Death by Pablo Palacio. The plot of the story follows a protagonist who reads a chronicle about the murder of a man labeled as "vicious", so he decides to investigate the case and, at the end, concludes that the crime was perpetrated by the father of a teenager whom the man had tried to seduce.

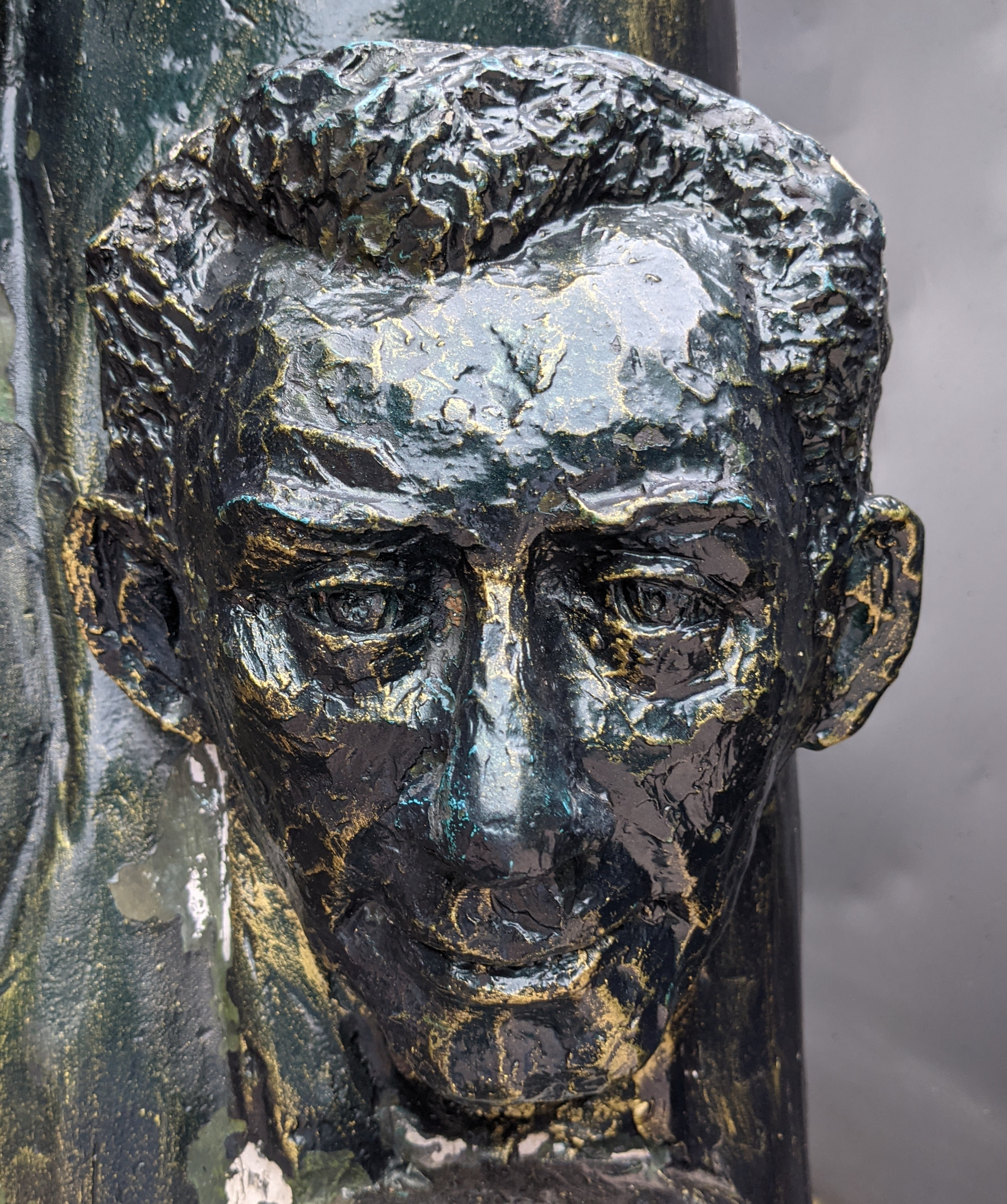
Monument to Joaquín Gallegos Lara, author of Al subir el aguaje.

Four years later, in 1930, the Guayaquil writer Joaquín Gallegos Lara published the short story "Al subir el aguaje" as part of the book Los que se van, which constitutes the first Ecuadorian literary work to portray female homosexuality. The protagonist of the story, the Manflor, is described with characteristics commonly defined as masculine, in addition to the fact that the term "manflor" was at that time an Argentinian idiom used to designate men considered effeminate. In the story, the Manflor confronts Cuchucho, who, despite knowing the rumor about her sexual orientation, tries to seduce and then rape her. In the end the two engage in a duel in which the Manflor emerges victorious.

Although both stories depict homophobia at that time, and in the case of Gallegos Lara's story even a symbolic victory over macho violence, the narrators reproduce the discriminatory discourse to refer to their characters. In the case of Palacio's story, the protagonist asserts that the murdered man "had had a deviation of his instincts since he was a child, which made him depraved from then on". The narrator of "Al subir el aguaje", on the other hand, refers to Manflor with the derogatory term "marimacho".

Another early representation took place in the novel Camarada (1933), by Humberto Salvador from Guayaquil. One of the characters portrayed in the novel is Toya, a woman who accepts herself as a lesbian. Gloria, another of the characters in the novel, tells of her lesbian experiences in a school of nuns and the jealousy that her love affair with one of her classmates generated in one of the nuns. She also reveals to the protagonist that lesbian relationships were very common in such schools.

=== Second half of the 20th century ===
In the following decades more literary works with LGBT characters appeared, although many of the representations maintained negative connotations. An example is the story "Cara e' santo" (1953) by Rafael Díaz Ycaza, in which Julio Barbosa, a political lieutenant of Samborondón, unsuccessfully tries to seduce the protagonist. At the end of the story Barboza appears dead floating in a river. Pedro Jorge Vera also gave a negative vision in his story "Los señores vencen" (1968), where a young homosexual who commits suicide leaves a letter to his father in which he refers to himself as "a disgusting little monster" and "hopelessly sick".

A notorious novel is Por qué Jesús no vuelve, published in 1963 by Benjamín Carrión. In it, the author criticizes the conservatives of the time but at the same time includes several passages in which he takes a negative view of homosexuality by suggesting that the sexual orientation of one of the characters was caused by seeing the physical abuse of his mother, including "sexual inversion" in the list of defects of another and pointing out in a dialogue that young people should be oriented to keep them away from "intersexuality". However, in a passage near the end of the novel, Carrión departs from the stance of Ecuadorian writers of the time and takes a stand against homophobia when he states, in relation to one of the characters: "Maricón. Yes, he was, but he didn't hurt anyone that way".

The writer Eugenia Viteri published several stories about homosexual characters during the 60's and 70's. The first of them was "Los impuros", published in 1962 in the book Doce cuentos (Twelve stories), in which she narrates the wake of a homosexual man after his suicide. His parents question themselves, ashamed about the wrongs they could have done to have such a son and express their hostility when they see the arrival of their son's lover, who turns out to be the only one who loved the deceased as he was. "New Lilianas", published in 1969, is remarkably negative in representation: it tells the story of a woman's marriage to a man who is soon shown to be a sadistic abuser, who married her with the sole intention of concealing his homosexuality.

Another story on these themes written by Viteri is "Florencia", published in 1977, in the book of short stories Los zapatos y los sueños (Shoes and dreams), which is the story of two women (Isaura and Florencia) who had a sentimental relationship that ended when Florencia decides to leave Isaura for a man. As the years go by, Florencia has a life marked by poverty and unhappiness and finally dies of tuberculosis. During her funeral, Isaura reproaches her for having wasted the possibility of being happy together by saying: "Together we were invincible. Strong as the herb that stirs the wind, washes away the dust, moistens the rain and -even if everyone stomps on it-, keeps facing the sky...!".

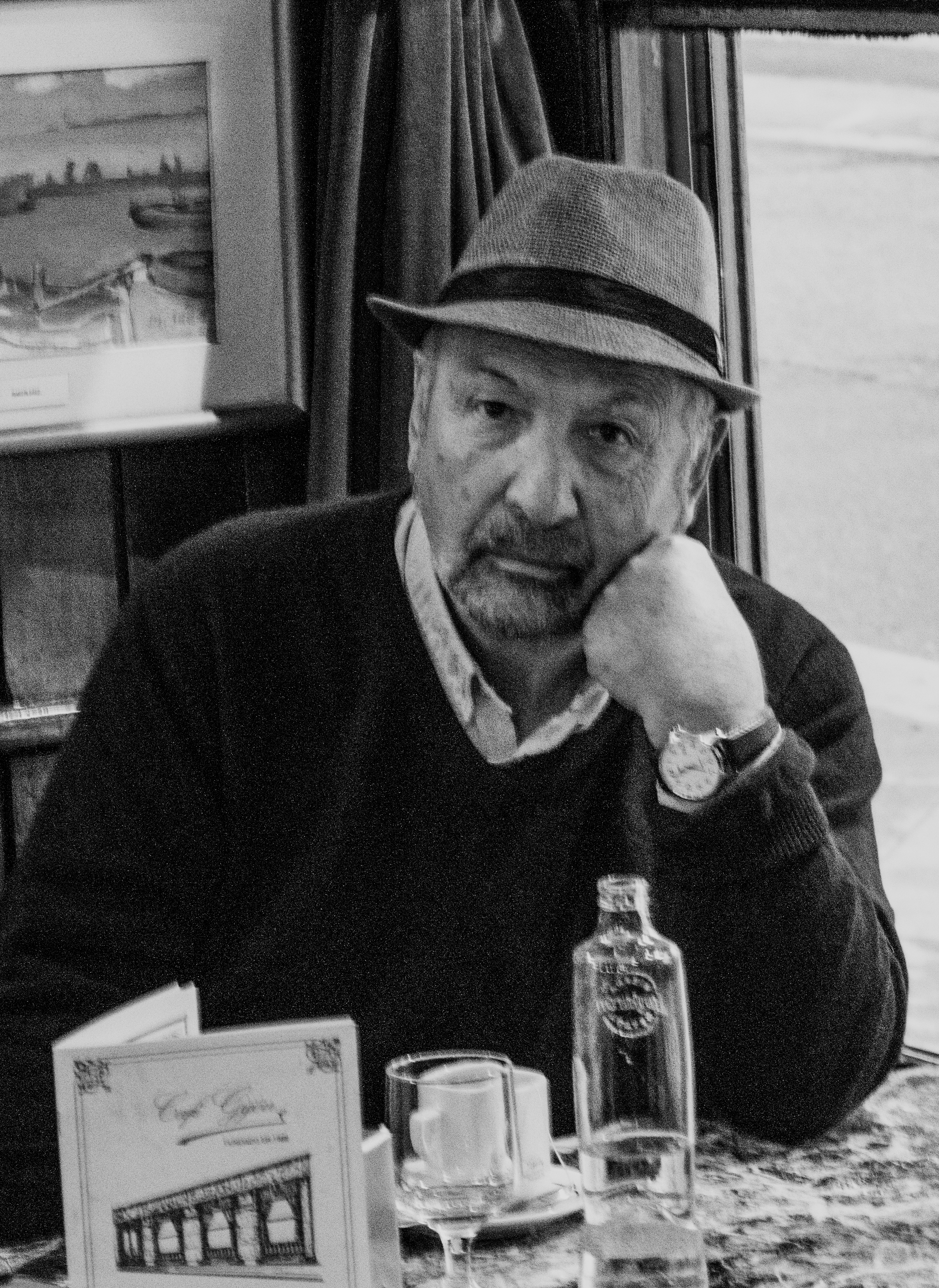
Javier Vásconez, author of «Big Angel, my love» (Angelote, amor mío) (1982)

As can be observed in the stories by Ycaza, Vera and Viteri, death (often by suicide) is a recurrent end for LGBT characters in the narrative of the time. This is replicated in the story "Big Angel, my love" (Angelote, amor mío) by Javier Vásconez, published in 1982 in the book Far-Away City (Ciudad lejana), a narrative in baroque language that follows the internal monologue of Julián during the wake of his lover, Jacinto, a homosexual man belonging to Quito's upper class. The story, which is now considered a classic of Ecuadorian literature, was the subject of controversy at the time of its publication for criticizing the moral hypocrisy and religiosity of society, which led to its reading being banned by the Ministry of Education. Another example is the novel Azulinaciones (1989), by Natasha Salguero, in which the protagonist's best friend, known as Negro, commits suicide because of his sexual orientation. In the case of the story "It's friday forever, Marilin" (Es viernes para siempre, Marilín) (1997), by Huilo Ruales, the death of the LGBT character is caused by a homophobic attack perpetrated by his own mother.

Another approach widely used at that time was the exploration of the conflict generated by the "what should be", which led many characters to seek a heterosexual life in order to conform to the social norms of the time. This occurs in "Florencia", by Eugenia Viteri, but also in stories such as "Nuncamor" (1984), by Jorge Dávila Vásquez, and "Macorina" (1997), by Raúl Pérez Torres, where the protagonist, who had married a man to hide her sexual orientation, decides to leave her husband and claims, in relation to her sexuality: "Now I am only moved by perversion, that is, what moralists call perversion and I name it epiphany". A similar situation to "Macorina" also occurs in "En el sótano" (1999), by María Auxiliadora Balladares, in which two children discover the love affair their father had had with his deceased brother-in-law.

At the end of the 20th century, the figure of Raúl Vallejo appears, who after several publications became the writer who most extensively explored sexual diversity in Ecuadorian narrative up to that time. First in two stories in "Masks for a Concert" (Máscaras para un concierto) (1986) and then more widely in the book Fiesta de solitarios, which won the Joaquín Gallegos Lara prize for the best book of short stories in 1992. Stories such as "Cristina, envuelto por la noche", "Te escribiré de París" and "La noche por partida doble" deal with mature themes such as love between men and transgender women, homophobic violence and male prostitution. Vallejo's exploration of LGBT themes continued to garner critical success in later years, particularly with his story "Astrología para debutantes" (2000), in which the protagonist traces, in the midst of depression over loss, the memories of time he spent with his former boyfriend, now deceased. "Astrología para debutantes" was the first Ecuadorian story to show the drama of LGBT characters in the context of AIDS, and was identified by writer María Augusta Correa as one of the three most recognized LGBT stories in Ecuadorian literature, along with "The Man Who Was Kicked to Death" (1926) and "Big Angel, my love" (1982).

=== 21st century ===
The new millennium brought a marked evolution in the representation of sexual diversity in Ecuadorian literature. Among the outstanding works of these years, there is Salvo el calvario, published in 2005 by Lucrecia Maldonado, which became one of the first Ecuadorian novels to portray a same-sex relationship in a positive way. The plot follows Fernando, Miguel and Susana, three friends who are immersed in a sort of love triangle and the announcement of an illness leads the two men to accept their sexuality and confess their feelings for each other. The novel won the Aurelio Espinosa Polit prize, awarded by the Pontifical Catholic University of Ecuador.

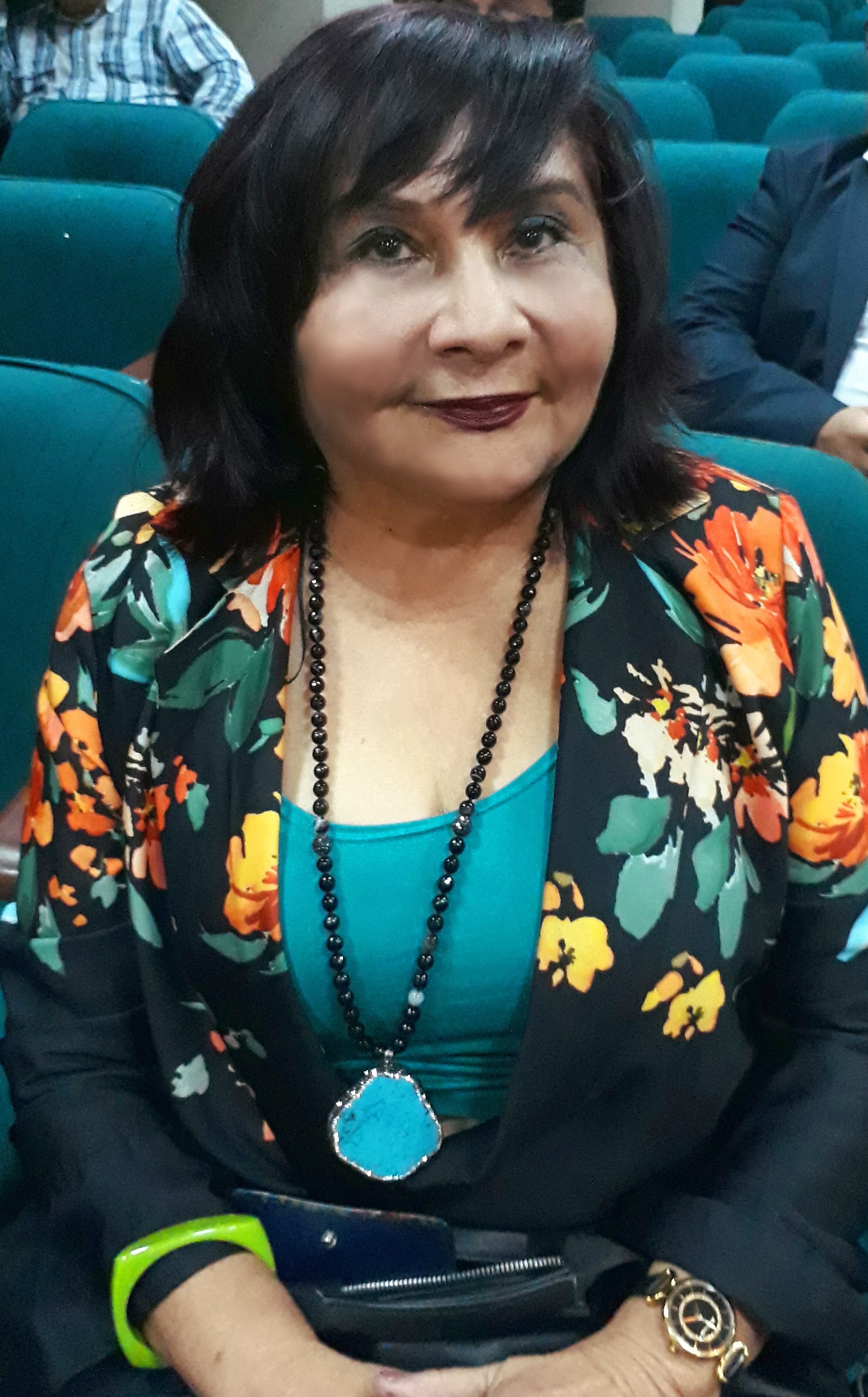
Sonia Manzano, author of Eses fatales (2005)

2005 was also the publication year of Eses fatales, by poet and storyteller Sonia Manzano, considered the first lesbian novel written by an Ecuadorian woman, which portrays the love between two women intertwining fragments of the life of the Greek poet Sappho of Lesbos. Manzano, who had already dealt with female homosexuality in her novel Y no abras la ventana todavía (1993) and in her short story "George" (1999), referred shortly after publishing the novel to the risk still involved in writing a book on this subject in a society like Ecuador's, which Manzano said "discriminates against those who are different for the simple fact of being different".

The short story also saw an upturn in terms of positive representations of LGBT characters. Juan Carlos Cucalón works in his short story "La niña Tulita" (2009), about a dead transgender woman who becomes a saint and healer in her hometown, whose inhabitants punish her father's transphobia. Another example is "Los Azules" (2013) by Adolfo Macías Huerta, about Trilce, a woman who divorces her husband after falling in love with her friend Mireya, with whom she participates in a movement against gender violence; or "Accidente" (2015), by Gabriela Ponce, where the protagonist has an intense sexual awakening after sleeping with a woman named Ileana, who after an accident begins to suffer from amnesia. The story "Elella" (2013) by Marcelo Báez from Guayaquil, on the other hand, is significant for its use of neologisms as a way of transgressing language, like "macha", "amanta" and the name of the story itself, a combination of the pronouns "he" (él) and "she" (ella).

The 2010s brought several award-winning and critically well-received LGBT-themed novels. Pequeños palacios en el pecho, by Luis Borja Corral, won the Aurelio Espinosa Polit Award in 2014 with a story that narrates the love between two young men, written with a colloquial language that explores sensuality, youth and taboo topics, such as euthanasia. In 2018, Raúl Vallejo won the Miguel Donoso Pareja Short Novel Prize with his work Gabriel(a), a story of a transgender woman who falls in love with a Quito executive and struggles to be recognized for her work as a journalist in a discriminatory society.

In recent years, themes related to sexual diversity have been addressed by writers such as Mónica Ojeda, María Fernanda Ampuero and María Auxiliadora Balladares. Among Ojeda's works that explore the area is the novel Nefando (2016), in which Iván Herrera, one of the characters, suffers a strong gender dysphoria that leads him to commit acts of self-mutilation; as well as Diego and Eduardo, two young men who explore their sexuality through violent practices. We can also mention Jawbone (2018), in which she addresses the beginning of falling in love between two teenage girls, and "Earthquake" (Terremoto)" (2020), a tale about two sisters in an incestuous relationship that explores, in the author's words, "forbidden desire in the midst of the apocalypse". María Fernanda Ampuero, meanwhile, explores sexual awakening and lesbian love in her story "Nam", which won the Cosecha Eñe award in its 2016 edition from among 4,000 participating works.

== Poetry ==
Homoerotic poetry in Ecuador includes, among its earliest representatives, the poets David Ledesma Vásquez, Ileana Espinel and Francisco Granizo. Ledesma in particular suffered strong rejection from his family because of his homosexuality and was even hospitalized by his father in a clinic in Lima, where he underwent conversion therapy. Several of his poems show a sense of self-identification towards abject or repulsive traits, characteristics that society in the 1950s ascribed to any non-heterosexual person. In other poems he addresses society's misunderstanding of dissident sexualities, as in "Oscar Wilde," where he writes, in reference to the Irish writer's sexuality:

But his Love, oh, bitter obscure salt!
O, hard Love, scarcely understood
in a century of infamy!
O luminous wound gnawed
by the filthy mouths of men!...

Although in many poems Ledesma centers on the pain caused by the rejection of his sexual orientation, in others, such as "Plegaria Ególatra", on the contrary, he openly and unabashedly explores his sexual desires. Another example of this is "Los ángeles que huyeron de Sodoma", in which he transforms the biblical city into a paradise of peace where love between men is presented as a pure and human feeling, as shown in the following fragment:

(...) they were pure there, because that soil
was plowed by men who had pure hands,
and they loved the friend who –in the afternoon–
after sweating together in the threshing floors
toasted the wine of their love to men
with the purest light in their eyes.

Other Ecuadorian poets who have written about sexual dissidence in later decades are: Maritza Cino, Carolina Portaluppi, Roy Sigüenza and María Auxiliadora Balladares. Homosexual desire is precisely the central motif of Sigüenza's poetry, which explores themes such as the beauty of the male body, the sea as a metaphor for love between men, and cruising. Another characteristic of Sigüenza's poetry is the use of metaphors to refer to the male sexual organ, including spurs, flora and the sea itself. An example can be seen in the poem "La invitación", in which he refers to the penis in the lines: "no diré nada si afilas en mi cuerpo/ tu espuela de esmeralda/ con la que en la noche me herirás/ dulcemente me herirás" (I will say nothing if you sharpen in my body/ your emerald spur/ with the one that in the night you will hurt me/ sweetly you will hurt me). In his poetry, Sigüenza also addresses the rejection and homophobia in contemporary society, as shown in the poem "Escondites" (2006), in which he writes:

Hotels do not allow
couples of men in love
in their rooms
(even if they brag their heterosexuality
the receptionist always has doubts)
for them there are abandoned houses,
the bush, the parks,
the back seats of movie theaters,
the buses,
(lights off)
to where love comes,
calls them and welcomes them.

In recent years, poets such as Federico Tibiezas and the transgender writer Victoria Vaccaro García have emerged, who have explored sexual diversity in their poetry collections Encuentros homosexuales con Pancho Jaime and Árbol ginecológico, respectively.

== See also ==
- Ecuadorian literature
- Culture of Ecuador
- LGBT literature in Argentina
- LGBT literature in Colombia
- LGBT literature in El Salvador
- LGBT literature in Mexico
- LGBT literature in Spain
- Bengali Queer Literature
- The Man Who Was Kicked to Death
