= Gabriel(a) =

2019 novel by Raúl Vallejo

- Author: Raúl Vallejo Corral
- Language: Spanish
- Genre: Novel
- Publisher: Penguin Random House
- Publication date: 2019
- Publication place: Ecuador
- Awards: Premio de Narrativa Miguel Donoso Pareja
- ISBN: 978-958-5458-70-3
- Website: Novel's webpage

Gabriel(a) is a novel by Ecuadorian writer Raúl Vallejo Corral published in 2019 by Penguin Random House. It tells the story of Gabriela, a trans woman who falls in love with a businessman from Quito and who faces discrimination from society to achieve her dream of becoming a journalist. The plot was inspired by the story of Michelle Valencia, Colombia's first trans news anchor.

Among the novel's themes are the social exclusion suffered by transgender people, exemplified by the various situations in which both the protagonist and her acquaintances have to deal with discrimination, including the lack of job opportunities, physical violence, and even the danger of falling victims to human trafficking and sexual slavery networks. It also explores the social changes that have taken place in terms of the acceptance of LGBT populations via references to classic works of Latin American and Ecuadorian LGBT literature.

Each chapter in the novel has an illustration created by Ecuadorian artist Joaquín Serrano using a coffee drawing technique.

== Plot ==
In the first scene of the novel, Gabriela throws a rock at a van after getting fed up with the insults hurled at her by the driver and his companions. The men in the van decide to chase her, so Gabriela flees. While she runs, she recalls other times when she had withstood violence and discrimination for being a trans woman. She remembers her school, in her native Guayaquil, where everyone humiliated or beat her, as well as the discrimination she continued to suffer in Quito as a communication studies major.

Months earlier, she had met Miguel, an upper-class heterosexual businessman who had gone to Socios, an LGBTQ bar, after finding out that his ex-girlfriend had been unfaithful. At the bar, he meets Yazmín, a trans woman from Colombia. He then meets Gabriela, whom he feels attracted to.

Over the following weeks, Gabriela starts dating Miguel, who is embarrassed at first and does not want his acquaintances to find out. Gabriela tells him about her dream of being a news anchor and how she had completed her college internship at a television station, although she was only offered the position of the makeup artist.

Miguel repeatedly advises her to be less combative towards those who are prejudiced against her. However, Gabriela tells him of all the times she has been discriminated against and says she is not willing to put up with it any longer. Over time and after getting to know her more, Miguel falls in love with her and even accompanies her to the civil registry to legally change her name to Gabriela and her gender marker to female. They go through many other situations together, including a trip to Montañita, where Miguel learns of Gabriela's religiosity. Also, the fear and pain she feels at the attacks perpetrated by a gang that tortured and beat trans women, and that she recognizes as the group that chased her in the van at the beginning of the novel. Moreover, upon learning of their relationship, Miguel's parents react with contempt and outright refuse to accept her as their son's partner.

Months later, Gabriela and Miguel take part together in the International LGBT Pride Day parade in Quito. They then go to the bar where they meet to celebrate that Gabriela had finally gotten a job as a reporter at a radio station, and they also learn that the gang that had been beating and torturing trans women had been recently captured with the help of Gabriela's report. Everyone celebrates happily that evening. At a certain point, a mariachi band arrives to serenade Gabriela, while Miguel pulls out a ring and proposes to her. Gabriela says yes and they both spend the night together.

== Main characters ==
- Gabriela: the protagonist of the story, a trans woman from Guayaquil who lives in Quito. Throughout her life, she has experienced discrimination because of her gender identity, but she refuses to give up her aspirations or settle for one of the two options that society relegates trans women to either prostitution or hairdressing. She dreams of being a news anchor, but only manages to get a job at a TV station as a makeup artist. When describing Gabriela, Vallejo said that she is a character who:

(...) no se rinde y su lucha es el combate de cada día por la dignidad de su propia persona. A pesar de la discriminación, en el plano laboral, social, o emocional, Gabriela se empecina en ser libre. (Note: English: Does not give up and fights every day for her dignity as her person. Despite discrimination, whether at work, socially, or emotionally, Gabriela is determined to be free.)

- Miguel: a heterosexual man who works as a bank executive and comes from a conservative family. His father is a prestigious lawyer. After breaking up with his girlfriend, he goes to a bar where he meets Gabriela, who was wearing a yellow suit that evening—like the one Uma Thurman was wearing in Kill Bill (2003)—and to whom he begins to feel attracted. They soon start a relationship, despite Miguel's doubts and the problems it could cause him with his parents.
- Yazmín: a Colombian trans woman who moves to Ecuador to escape the armed violence of her country's guerrilla and paramilitary groups. She engages in prostitution via Facebook. She dreams of moving to Europe, which leads her to come into contact with a human trafficking network.

== Background ==
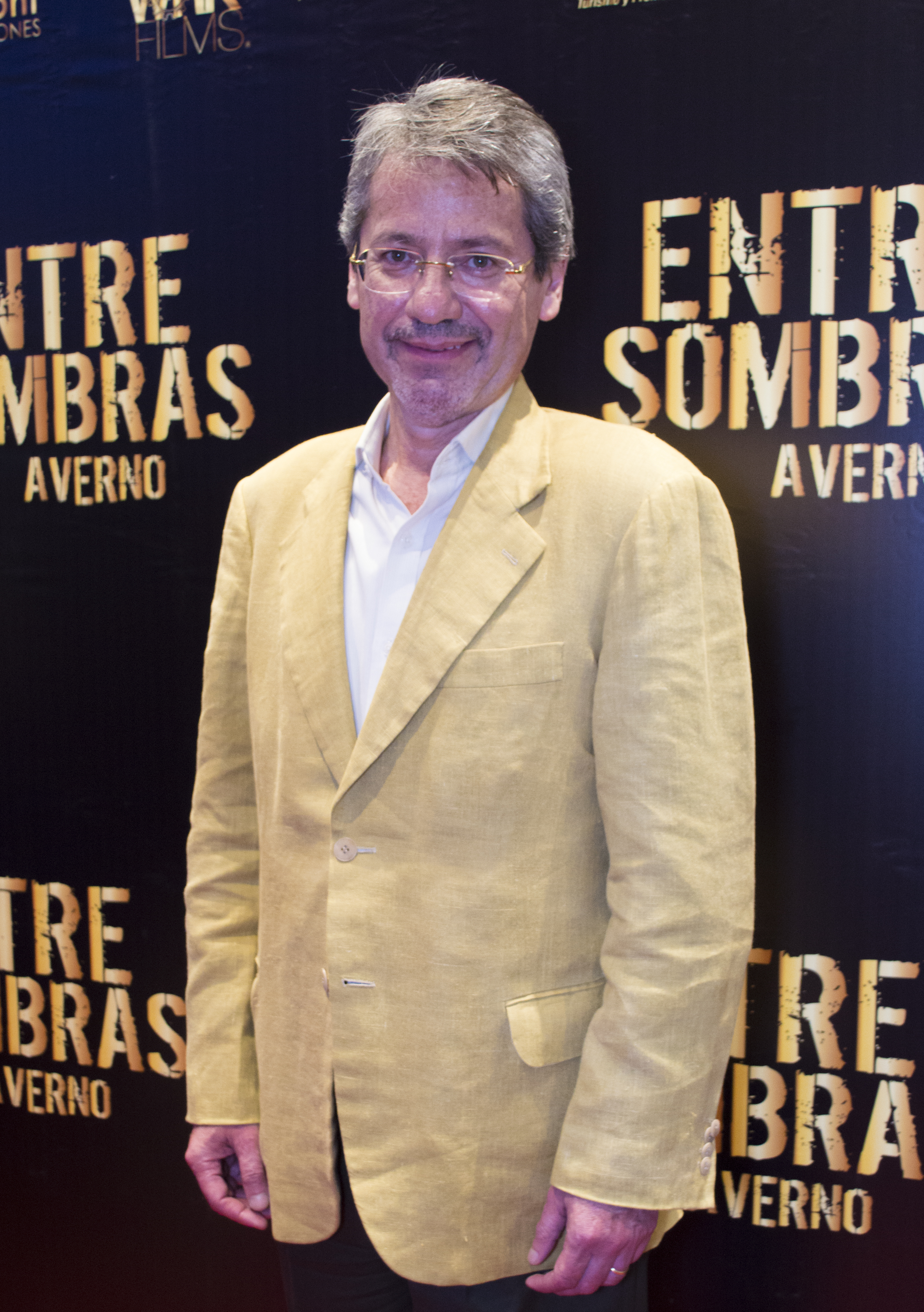
Raúl Vallejo in 2016

According to Vallejo, he was inspired to write the novel by a need to reflect on the discrimination and violence that trans people experience in their attempt to be accepted in society. The character of Gabriela is based on Colombian trans journalist Michelle Valencia, whom Vallejo met in 2011 when she was covering the Bogotá International Book Fair for Canal Capital. The two became friends and Vallejo began discussing with her the idea of writing a book based on her life. Subsequently, Vallejo decided to write an entirely fictional story, although the character of Gabriela continued to have traits of Valencia, to whom he dedicated the book.

Developing the idea for the book and researching the subject took Vallejo about three years. He began writing the first draft in 2017, which took him approximately four months. He then continued proofreading the manuscript until the following year, when he submitted it to the Miguel Donoso Pareja Award for Novella, which he eventually won. Vallejo submitted the work to the competition under the title Gabriel(a), parábola de transeúntes and used the name Michelle Valencia as a pseudonym.

The book references characters and locations from his short story Te escribiré de París, published in Fiesta de solitarios (1992), in which he also tells the love story between a heterosexual man and a trans woman. Among the places and characters he took up again is the alternative bar Socios, located in the parish of Mariscal Sucre in Quito, as well as Pepe Bruno, the owner of the bar.

== Central themes ==
=== Transphobic violence ===
According to literary critic Alicia Ortega Caicedo, one of the recurring themes throughout the novel is the confirmation of the exclusion and violence that trans women suffer in society, a situation portrayed in the very first scene of the book, when Gabriela throws a rock against the van of the men who insulted her, and then runs away. The book then depicts the discrimination and violence she has suffered in educational, work, and medical environments, as well as the memory of brutal attacks against other trans women, which is constantly present in the mind of the protagonist, as shown in the following fragment:

Te acuerdas de la noticia, meses atrás: a una chica trans llamada Sara, unos tipos que andaban en una camioneta similar a la de tus perseguidores le habían cortado la mejilla y los labios, el pecho y las piernas, en la 6 de Diciembre y Foch, la madrugada de un sábado, cuando ella caminaba rumbo a un bar. (Note: English: Do you remember the news, from months ago: a trans girl named Sara, some men in a van, similar to the one your pursuers were in, had cut off her cheek and lips, her chest and legs, at [the corner of Avenida] 6 de Diciembre and [Mariscal] Foch, in the early hours of a Saturday morning, when she was walking to a bar.)

Vallejo expresses Gabriela's position on the discrimination she suffers when, during a conversation with Miguel, she says: Yo solo quiero caminar por las calles sin que nadie me joda. (Note: English: I just want to walk the streets without anyone bothering me.) Beyond the physical aggressions, he shows that the violence that both Gabriela and other women in a similar situation suffer through not only comes from their aggressors but also from other sectors of society, such as the press, as when Gabriela reads in the crime news section of a newspaper the headline Un travesti se sumó a la lista de muertos de La Mariscal (Note: English: A transvestite added to the list of the dead in La Mariscal) and, annoyed, says that the headline should instead read Una chica trans fue asesinada por criminales homófobos. (Note: English: A trans girl was murdered by homophobic criminals.) Likewise, the novel recreates the drama of trans women who are forced into prostitution after being rejected for every other job, which causes some of them to end up in situations of torture or sexual slavery at the hands of human traffickers.

Another issue that is highlighted in the novel is that most transphobic hate crimes go unpunished. According to Ortega, the pain in the face of this reality is depicted by the character of Pepe Bruno, who mourns the loss of each friend and takes on the role of preserving the testimonies of violence by writing down the name of each murdered trans woman as a way of perpetuating their memory.

=== New visions of diversity ===
The novel portrays the social and cultural changes that have taken place in recent decades regarding the integration of LGBT persons and the achievements in terms of their equal rights by showing a new vision of the LGBT narrative, which makes references to Latin American classics of the genre but, at the same time, takes a more positive look into its plot and protagonist. According to professor Pedro Artieda, among the works referenced in Gabriel(a) are classics of Latin American LGBT literature, such as El lugar sin límites by José Donoso, (Note: Translated by Suzanne Jill Levine as Hell Has No Limits (1972)) or Tengo miedo, torero by Pedro Lemebel. (Note: Translated by Katherine Silver as My Tender Matador (2001)) In the case of Donoso's novel, the transphobic aggression that Manuela experiences at the end of the novel is strongly echoed by the opening scene in Gabriel(a), with a group of men who are initially attracted to the protagonists but, as soon as they feel their heterosexuality come into play, they respond with violence. However, Vallejo gives an opposite conclusion to Donoso's in the scene: while Manuela is brutally beaten by her attackers, Gabriela fearlessly throws a rock at them, manages to escape the attempted assault, and even pepper sprays one of her pursuers.

As for Ecuadorian LGBT works, Vallejo draws a marked contrast with authors such as Joaquín Gallegos Lara, Pedro Jorge Vera, and Rafael Díaz Ycaza. While they created stories with LGBT persons in which the narrative voice showed a homophobic position, the omniscient narrator in Gabriel(a) takes an assertive position in favor of their struggle to achieve equality. Another difference when compared to previous Ecuadorian LGBT works of literature is found in the characters' decision about whether or not to remain in the closet, which can be seen when comparing Gabriel(a) to short stories such as Te escribiré de París, written by Vallejo himself in the 1990s, in which Roberto, a heterosexual man in love with a trans woman, prefers to hide his attraction for fear of what his family will think. Meanwhile, in Gabriel(a), Miguel openly goes out with her to tourist sites without being ashamed of their relationship.

As Artieda points out, the bar Socios, run by Pepe Bruno and which also appeared originally in Te escribiré de París, is another element of the story that symbolizes the change of meaning of sexual diversity in society and narrative. It goes from being considered [un] antro de pervertidos (Note: English: A den of perverts) in the past to becoming the place where love is born between Gabriela and Miguel.

== Reception ==
The novel was chosen unanimously as the winner of the 2018 edition of the Miguel Donoso Pareja Award for Novella awarded by the local government of Guayaquil. The members of the jury, Marcelo Báez Meza, Cecilia Velasco, and Elsa Cortés, explained their decision to award the prize to the novel:

(...) por abordar la otredad desde diversas perspectivas, por la construcción de personajes sólidos y por narrar el tránsito de un personaje dispuesto a pasar por varios umbrales para conquistar su propia identidad. (Note: English: Because it addresses otherness from different perspectives, it builds solid characters, and it narrates the journey of a character willing to go through several thresholds to conquer her own identity.)

Moreover, Báez described the novel as:

[Una] recuperación total del registro coloquial que está entre lo heteronormativo y lo queer y hay una fuerte militancia hacia lo GLBTI (Note: English: [A] thorough reclamation of the colloquial register that lies between heteronormativity and queerness, and there is a strong militancy towards LGBTI issues.)

The novel received positive reviews after its publication, some of which highlighted the importance of dealing with this type of issues in societies where there is still discrimination based on gender identity. Writer Eduardo Varas praised the skill with which Vallejo wrote the character of Gabriela, whom he described as:

[un] personaje fuerte, enfocado en su libertad, en esa necesidad tan humana como natural de ser feliz. (Note: English: [a] strong character, focused on her freedom, on that human and natural need to be happy.)

Of a similar opinion was Juliana Vargas, in an article in the Colombian newspaper El Espectador, who referred positively to the power of empathy used by the author to get into the mind of the main character and narrate her experience.

Ecuadorian newspaper Diario Expreso placed it in its list of the ten books that made an impact in 2019 and said that it was a necessary work that must be leída y compartida. (Note: English: Read and shared)

== See also ==
- LGBT literature in Ecuador
- Transgender literature

== Bibliography ==
- Artieda, Pedro (2019). "Gabriel (a): excesos lexicales y nuevos sentidos". Anales de la Universidad Central del Ecuador (in Spanish). 1 (377). Central University of Ecuador: 287–297. ISSN 1390-7891.
- Cabrera Kozisek, José Miguel (28 June 2019). "Gabriel(a): Parábola de transeúntes entre el clóset y el deseo" (PDF). Cartón Piedra (in Spanish). No. 399. Guayaquil: El Telégrafo (Ecuador). pp. 14–15. Archived from the original (PDF) on 12 July 2019.
- Ortega Caicedo, Alicia (2019). "Corre, y no te detengas que una jauría enardecida pretende darte caza. Una chica trans llamada Gabriela. Gabriel (a), de Raúl Vallejo". Anales de la Universidad Central del Ecuador (in Spanish). 1 (377). Central University of Ecuador: 277–286. ISSN 1390-7891.
- Vallejo Corral, Raúl (March 2019). Gabriel(a) (in Spanish). Penguin Random House. ISBN 9789585458703.
