= Eugenia Viteri =

Ecuadorian writer (1928–2023)

- Born: Blanca Eugenia Viteri Segura; 4 July 1928; Guayaquil, Ecuador
- Died: 21 September 2023 (aged 95); Quito, Ecuador
- Education: Casa de la Cultura
- Occupations: Writer, anthologist and teacher

Blanca Eugenia Viteri Segura (4 July 1928 – 21 September 2023) was an Ecuadorian writer, anthologist, women's rights activist, and teacher. She has been described as "a grand dame of Ecuadorian literature".

== Early life ==
Eugenia Viteri was born in Guayaquil, Ecuador, in 1928. Her father was Ignacio Viteri Urquiza, an accountant, and her mother was María Tomasa Segura Leó, who worked in a button factory. She showed an interest in poetry at an early age, cutting out and saving poems from the newspaper. In grade school, she was made editor of the school newspaper, which she took as an opportunity to interview such famous politicians as Galo Plaza Lasso.

In 1950, she enrolled in the theater school at the Casa de la Cultura's Guayas location. Three years later, after graduating with a bachelor's degree in modern humanities, she joined the Department of Philosophy and Letters and the University of Guayaquil.

=== Career beginnings ===
In 1954, Viteri sent her story "El Heredero" to a competition of the Club Femenino de Cultura, and she obtained second prize. That same year, she participated in the Jurisprudence Department's Festival of Letters with two stories titled "El anillo" and "El Chiquillo," which were subsequently included in the 1955 anthology Diez cuentos universitarios.

By 1955, Viteri had moved to Quito and found a job as a radio operator. It was there that she gave birth to her only daughter, Silvia Alexandra Vera, in 1957. Three years later, she returned to Guayaquil to work for the transit commission.

In 1962, she won fourth prize in a theater competition organized by the National Union of Journalists with her play "El Mar trajo la flor," based on her prior story "El anillo." She was also designated a member of the Casa de la Cultura that year.

== Exile ==
Viteri openly sympathized with Marxist ideas, so when the military dictatorship took control in 1963, she was forced to self-exile with her daughter in Chile, bringing only the money she could scrounge up through selling her furniture. There, she married Pedro Jorge Vera, an influential Ecuadorian communist and a close friend of Fidel Castro, in 1964. The couple moved to Cuba on Castro's invitation in 1965.

After the military regime fell in 1966, the new president Clemente Yerovi invited the couple to return to their homeland.

== Later career ==
Viteri was hired to supervise competitions and run the student newspaper at a grade school, the Colegio Nacional Veinticuatro de Mayo, in 1969. In 1975, she took over the school's literature department.

Due to antiquated and sexist laws, when Viteri sought to buy an apartment with her own savings in 1976, she was denied a loan because her husband already owned property. Consequently, the couple divorced, she purchased the apartment, and they immediately remarried.

Viteri founded the Manuela Sáenz Cultural Foundation in 1983. Through her work with the foundation, Viteri became one of the most important defenders of women's rights in Ecuador. She has been described as "a pioneer in introducing feminist themes to Ecuadorian fiction, such as domestic violence, prostitution, and romantic-sexual intimacy between women."

In 1984 she published her second novel, Las alcobas negras, which she dedicated to all Ecuadorian women who are still waiting to be treated as they should. Three years later she produced the Basic Anthology of Ecuadorian Stories.

In 2008, President Rafael Correa honored her with the Rosa Campuzano National Prize. She was among the first to receive the newly created award, which recognizes the work of noteworthy Ecuadorian women.

Viteri published over a dozen books including novels, short story collections, and anthologies. Her work has been translated into English, Russian, and Bulgarian.

== Death ==
Viteri died on 21 September 2023, at the age of 95.

== Published works ==
Novels:

- A noventa millas solamente (Quito, 1969)
- Las alcobas negras (Quito, 1983)

Stories:

- El anillo y otros cuentos (Quito, 1955)
- Doce cuentos (Quito, 1962)
- Los zapatos y los sueños (Guayaquil, 1977)
- Cuentos escogidos (Quito, 1983)

Anthologies:

Viteri helped produce the following anthologies:

- El nuevo relato ecuatoriano (Quito, 1951)
- 10 cuentos universitarios (Guayaquil, 1953)
- Cuento ecuatoriano contemporáneo (Guayaquil)
- Lectura y lenguaje (1978)
- Diez escritoras ecuatorianas y sus cuentos (Guayaquil, 1982)
- AMORica Latina (1991)
- Así en la tierra como en los sueños (Quito, 1991)
- Cuento contigo (Guayaquil, 1993)
- Antología de narradoras ecuatorianas (Quito, 1997)
- 40 cuentos ecuatorianos (Guayaquil, 1997)
