= Manuela Sáenz =

Ecuadorian revolutionary heroine (1797–1856)

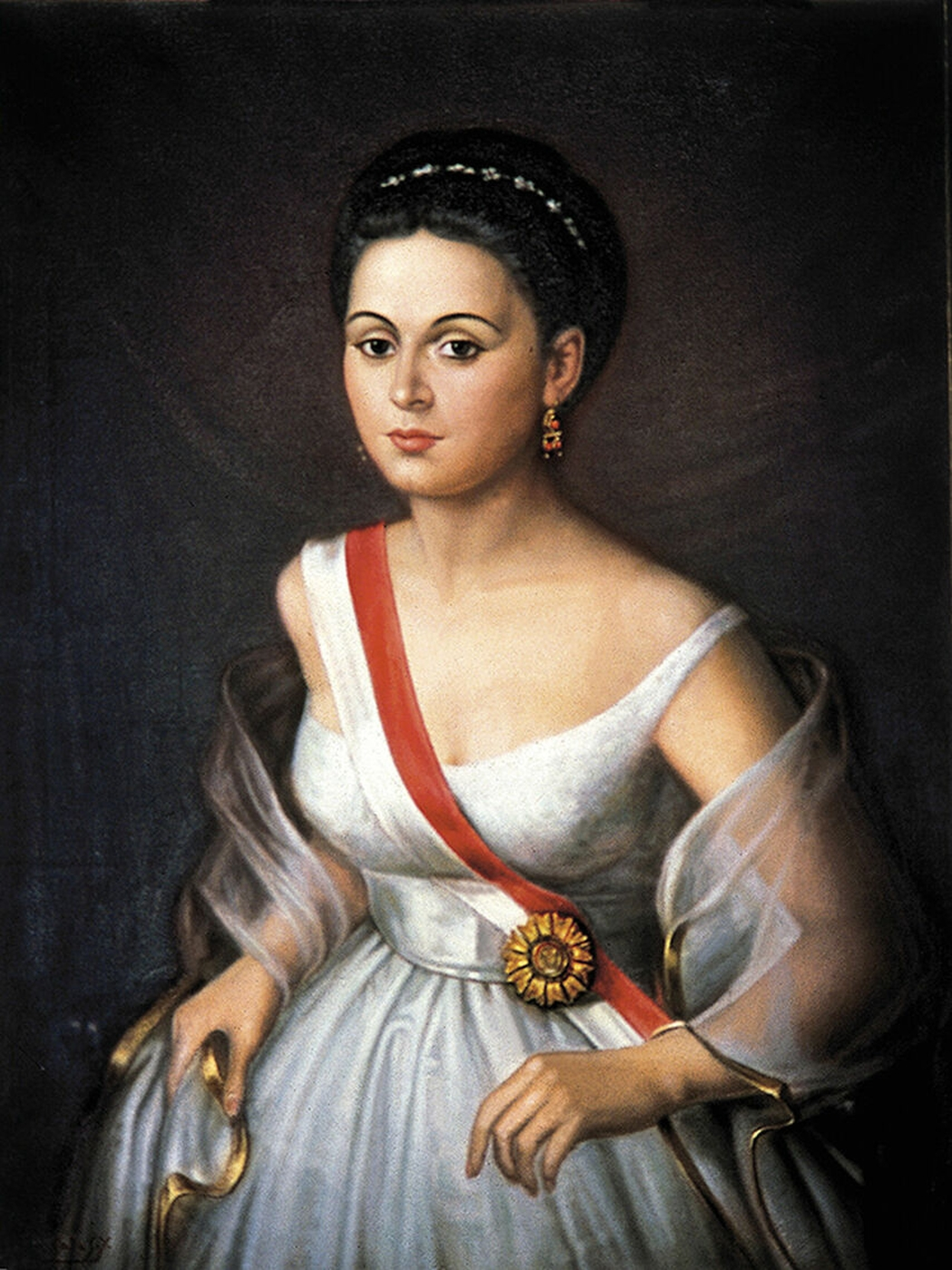
- Libertadora del Libertador wearing the Order of the Sun medal

1st First Lady of Colombia
- In role 17 June 1822 – 4 May 1830
- President: Simón Bolívar
- Preceded by: Position established
- Succeeded by: Juana Jurado Bertendona

6th First Lady of Peru
- In role 10 February 1824 – 28 January 1827
- President: Simón Bolívar
- Preceded by: Mariana Carcelén
- Succeeded by: Francisca Cernadas

1st First Lady of Bolivia
- In role 12 August – 29 December 1825
- President: Simón Bolívar
- Preceded by: Position established
- Succeeded by: Mariana Carcelén

Personal details
- Born: Manuela Sáenz de Vergara y Aizpuru; 27 December 1797 Quito, Viceroyalty of New Granada
- Died: 28 September 1856 (aged 58) Paita, Peru
- Spouse: James Thorne (married 1817 – estranged 1822)
- Domestic partner: Simón Bolívar (1822–1830)
- Occupation: Revolutionary and spy

Manuela Sáenz de Vergara y Aizpuru (27 December 1797 – 23 November 1856) was an Ecuadorian revolutionary heroine of South America who supported the revolutionary cause by gathering information, distributing leaflets and protesting for women's rights. Manuela received the Order of the Sun ("Caballeresa del Sol" or 'Dame of the Sun'), honoring her services in the revolution.

Sáenz married a wealthy English doctor in 1817 and became a socialite in Lima, Peru. This provided the setting for her involvement in political and military affairs, and she became active in support of revolutionary efforts. Leaving her husband in 1822, she soon began an eight-year collaboration and intimate relationship with Simón Bolívar that lasted until his death in 1830. After she prevented an 1828 assassination attempt against him and facilitated his escape, Bolívar began to call her "Libertadora del libertador" ("liberator of the liberator"). In an unknown letter she wrote, she claimed that "the Liberator is immortal", despite the fact that she was responsible for his survival. Manuela's role in the revolution was generally overlooked after her death until the late twentieth century, but now she is recognized as a feminist symbol of the 19th-century wars of independence.

== Life ==
=== Early life ===
Manuela was born in Quito, Viceroyalty of New Granada, the illegitimate child of Maria Joaquina Aizpuru from Ecuador and the married Spanish nobleman Simón Sáenz de Vergara y Yedra (or Sáenz y Verega). Her mother was abandoned by her modest family as a result of the pregnancy and her father paid for young "Manuelita" to go to school at the Convent of Santa Catalina where she learned to read and write. While there, she encountered a microcosm of the Spanish Colonial caste system, with white nuns ruling over a large group of mestiza and native servants and maids. She kept in contact with the upper class nuns of Santa Catalina for much of the rest of her life, and they provided counsel to her. She was forced to leave the convent at the age of seventeen, allegedly because she was discovered to have been seduced by army officer Fausto D'Elhuyar, the son of Fausto Elhuyar and nephew of Juan José Elhuyar, who were the co-discoverers of tungsten.

=== Early participation within the revolution ===
For several years, Manuela lived with her father, who in 1817 arranged for her marriage to a wealthy English doctor, James Thorne, who was twice her age. She married Dr. Thorne out of obedience, not out of love. The couple moved to Lima, Peru, in 1819 where she lived as an aristocrat and held social gatherings in her home where guests included political leaders and military officers. These guests shared military secrets about the ongoing revolution with her, and, in 1819, when Simón Bolívar took part in the successful liberation of New Granada, Sáenz was radicalized and became an active member in the conspiracy against the viceroy of Peru, José de la Serna e Hinojosa during 1820.

As part of this conspiracy, Manuela, her friend Rosa Campuzano, and other women who were pro-Independence attempted to recruit colonial troops from the royalist defense arsenal in Lima, guarded by the vital Numancia regiment. The conspiracy was a success, with much of the regiment, including Manuela's half brother, defecting to the anti-Spanish army of José de San Martín.

Saenz was described as a heroine and known for her patriotism, which was noticed in her sympathies for the creole uprising against the Spanish control in South America.

San Martin, after proclaiming Peru’s independence in 1821, awarded Saenz with the highest distinction in Peru, which was the title of signet ring of the Order of the Sun of Peru. In her early periods she would hold secret gatherings, where she would pass information as a spy. Manuela Saenz participated in the negotiations with the Numancia battalion.

=== Relationship with Simón Bolívar (1822–1830) ===
In 1822, Sáenz left her husband and traveled to Quito, where at a ball she met Simón Bolívar, eventually becoming romantically involved. Bolívar's life was much more exciting and dangerous than Dr. Thorne's, and thus Sáenz was drawn to him. Their shared vision of freedom for Spanish colonies was the driving force that kept their relationship adventurous. However, her husband missed her and begged her to return to him, with the promise that he would forgive her for leaving him. She wrote to him and explained that she was not interested in restoring their marriage. She thought that he was far too serious, and that their relationship lacked passion. The qualities that she loathed in her husband were evident in Bolívar. Therefore, even through Bolívar's absence, she remained in constant contact with him. She exchanged love letters with him and visited him while he moved from one country to another. Bolívar referred to her as la amable loca, the kind madwoman.

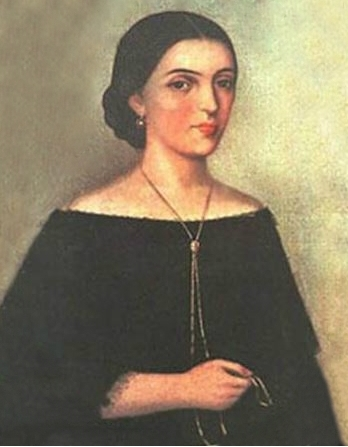
Painting of Manuela Saenz at the time

Manuela supported the revolutionary cause by gathering information, distributing leaflets, and protesting for women's rights. As one of the most prominent female figures of the wars for independence, Manuela received the Order of the Sun ("Caballeresa del Sol" or 'Dame of the Sun'), honoring her services in the revolution. In public she often wore a colonel's uniform, accompanied by her two black servants Jonatás and Nathán, also attired in soldier uniforms. During the first months of 1825 and from February to September 1826, she lived with Bolívar near Lima, but as the war continued, Bolívar was forced to leave.

During the anti-Bolivarian conspiracy led by Colombian Colonel José Bustamente, Manuela was a key member of the Pro-Bolivarian forces. On January 25, 1827, significant portions of the Colombian Army's Third Division mutinied in Lima, arresting senior officers and seizing key locations in the city, demanding better food and pay as General Andrés de Santa Cruz and the conspirators suspended the Bolivarian Constitution. Manuela had remained behind in Lima, trusted by Bolívar to look after his affairs, and moved to stop the mutiny. Presenting herself in full uniform, she addressed troops of the Third Division and begged them to remain loyal to Bolívar. Afterwards, she began bribing sergeants and corporals in the hopes of outbidding the conspirators, to some success. This continued until she was captured by the new Peruvian government on February 7, and imprisoned in a convent. She protested her treatment under both Bolivarian laws and new Peruvian laws, and this agitation would eventually see her released from prison in March, and forced into exile in April. As a result of this agitation, she was now beginning to be known as the Libertadora, a public legend to match Bolívar in the minds of some. Manuela now followed Bolívar to Bogotá.

On 25 September 1828, mutinous officers attempted to assassinate Bolívar. Woken by the sound of fighting, Bolívar intended to investigate, but Sáenz, who was sharing his bed, persuaded him to leave by a window while she confronted the intruders. She then convinced them that Bolívar was somewhere in the building and proceeded to lead them to various rooms, affecting to lose her way and even stopping to attend one of the wounded. Eventually the would-be assassins lost patience and beat her before departing. Her actions led Bolívar later to call her "Libertadora del Libertador".

After the assassination attempt, Manuela proved to be a key part of identifying the loyalties and reliabilities of army officers, attempting to help Bolívar maintain control of the disintegrating Gran Colombia.

Bolívar left Bogotá in 1830 and died in Santa Marta from tuberculosis while he was in transit, leaving the country to exile. His death left her without fortunes, and as the political target for the national government. Historians often link the last few years of Bolívar's decline to Manuela's reputation. On his deathbed, Bolívar had asked his aide-de-camp, General Daniel Florence O'Leary to burn the remaining, extensive archive of his writings, letters, and speeches. O'Leary disobeyed the order and his writings survived, providing historians with a vast wealth of information about Bolívar's liberal philosophy and thought, as well as details of his personal life, such as his longstanding love affair with Manuela Sáenz. These letters in part cleared her reputation by disproving the stereotypes used to exaggerate the importance of Bolívar. Shortly before her death in 1856, Sáenz augmented this collection by giving O'Leary her own letters from Bolívar. Francisco de Paula Santander, who returned to power after Bolívar's death then exiled Manuela. She went to Jamaica for the early years of her exile. She remained politically active until the mid-1840s before becoming disillusioned.

=== Years in exile and death (1835–1856) ===
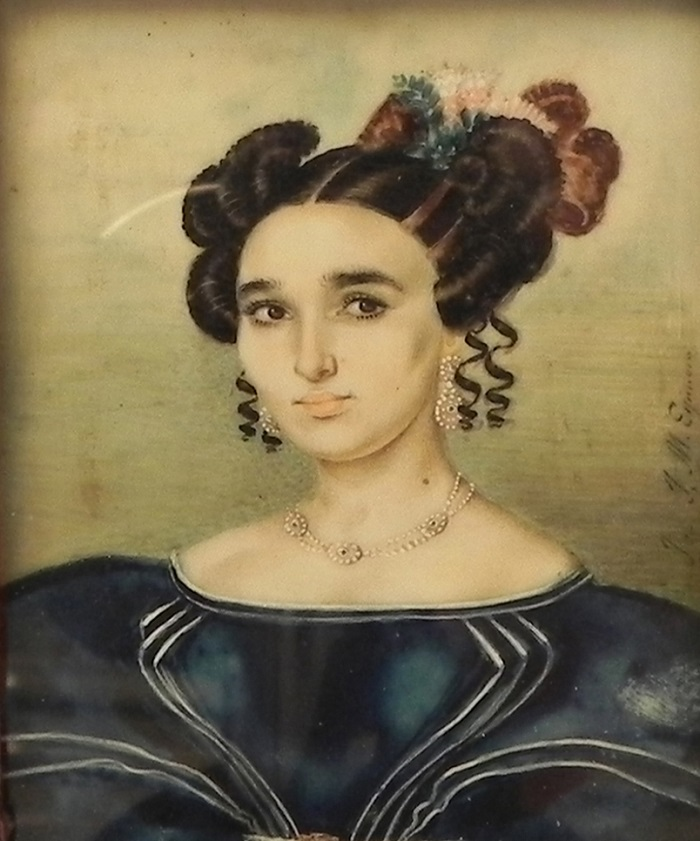
Portrait of Manuela Sáenz (1830) - Bogotá.

When she attempted to return to Ecuador in 1835, the Ecuadorian president, Vicente Rocafuerte, revoked her passport. She was charged with conspiracy against the Spanish crown, and was thus exiled, despite the fact that she did not get a trial. Rocafuerte justified his order to exile Sáenz by stating “It is the women who most promote the spirit of anarchy in these countries". She then took refuge in northern Peru, living in the small coastal town of Paita. She remained politically active and frequently wrote letters to other revolutionaries. She descended into poverty and for the next 25 years, a destitute outcast, Manuela sold tobacco and translated letters for North American whale hunters who wrote to their lovers in Hispanic America. While there, she met the American author Herman Melville, and the revolutionary Giuseppe Garibaldi.

Saenz would establish The Society of Patriotic Ladies and decorating the members with the slogan “To the patriotism of the most sensitive" Manuela Sáenz and other women partook in conspiracies against Spanish rule in her years of exile.

In 1847, her husband was murdered in Pativilca and she was denied her 8,000 pesos inheritance. Disabled after the stairs in her home collapsed, Manuela died in Paita, on 23 November 1856, during a diphtheria epidemic. Her body was buried in a communal, mass grave and her belongings were burned. The items that did survive, personal letters and artifacts, contributed later to the legacy of both her and Simon Bolívar.

=== Feminist contribution ===
During Saenz's time, women's realm consisted of private and domestic spaces while politics and warfare spaces were for men. She found various ways physically and symbolically to take part in masculine spheres of activity yet also take part in the feminine arenas of her period. She used feminine behaviours to have some influence in these masculine spaces, usually using her intimate relationships as tools.

She did not feel constrained by gendered conventions of what was considered proper feminine behaviour. She smoked, she dressed up in masculine clothes, and was trained for military action. Saenz was an erotic symbol with her passion for Bolivar.

Saenz was often described as an eccentric woman, and a lesbian, who "would dress up during the day as an official and during the night she went through a metamorphosis with the help of some wine."

Saenz is usually identified as an emancipated woman with a conviction for liberty and independence as well as a woman who broke the status quo.

She developed a discourse of friendship while in exile to give women some empowerment. This discourse was used to justify the influence of women in politics. Her work opposed the exclusion of women from politics by connecting friendship with female companionship. Seeing elite women as friends, instead of wives and mothers, goes against the issues surrounding the notion of “republican motherhood” which Saenz was familiar with at her time. This notion of motherhood focused on the idea that women were better as wives and mothers than as companions and collaborators. The praise of republican motherhood showed that there was fear and distress with the idea that women could influence and undermine the state if they were left on their own. Through the friendship discourse, women would be seen as friends and peers to men, as well as companions and collaborators.

Manuela Sáenz did not protest women’s exclusion from politics, but used that exclusion as a reasoning and personal interest into an affirmation of reliability and trustworthiness of women. Friendship, therefore, became a tool for independent women, which gave them a degree of influence greater than they were previously seen before this friendship discourse. Saenz believed that friendship would create stability and consistency, and switched the gendered icons within ideology at the time by encouraging friendship and the association of it with women.

Lastly, by putting aside the view of motherhood or the “woman problem,” Saenz' work and image encouraged women to demand respect from politicians and intellectuals as individuals and not just as icons of their sex.

=== Sexual orientation and LGBT rights activism ===
Manuela Sáenz was a bisexual woman. J. B. Boussingault wrote in his memoirs about her "inexplicably close relationships" with her friends Polycarpa and Baltasara. After her death, Sáenz became a symbol not only of feminism, but also of the struggle of sexual minorities (including homosexual and transgender people) for their rights. Her name appealed to many, offering to control the example of the Netherlands and legalize same-sex marriage in Ecuador. Robert T. Conn, however, wrote that there is no clear evidence that Manuela entered into same-sex relationships, but he noted that she had 'behavioral bisexuality'.

== Recognition and 2010 reburial ==
On 5 July 2010, Manuela Sáenz was given a full state burial in Venezuela. Because she had been buried in a mass grave, no official remains of her existed for the state burial; instead, "symbolic remains", composed of some soil from the mass grave into which she was buried during the epidemic, were transported through Peru, Ecuador and Colombia to Venezuela. Those remains were laid in the National Pantheon of Venezuela where those of Bolívar are also memorialized.

== Legacy ==
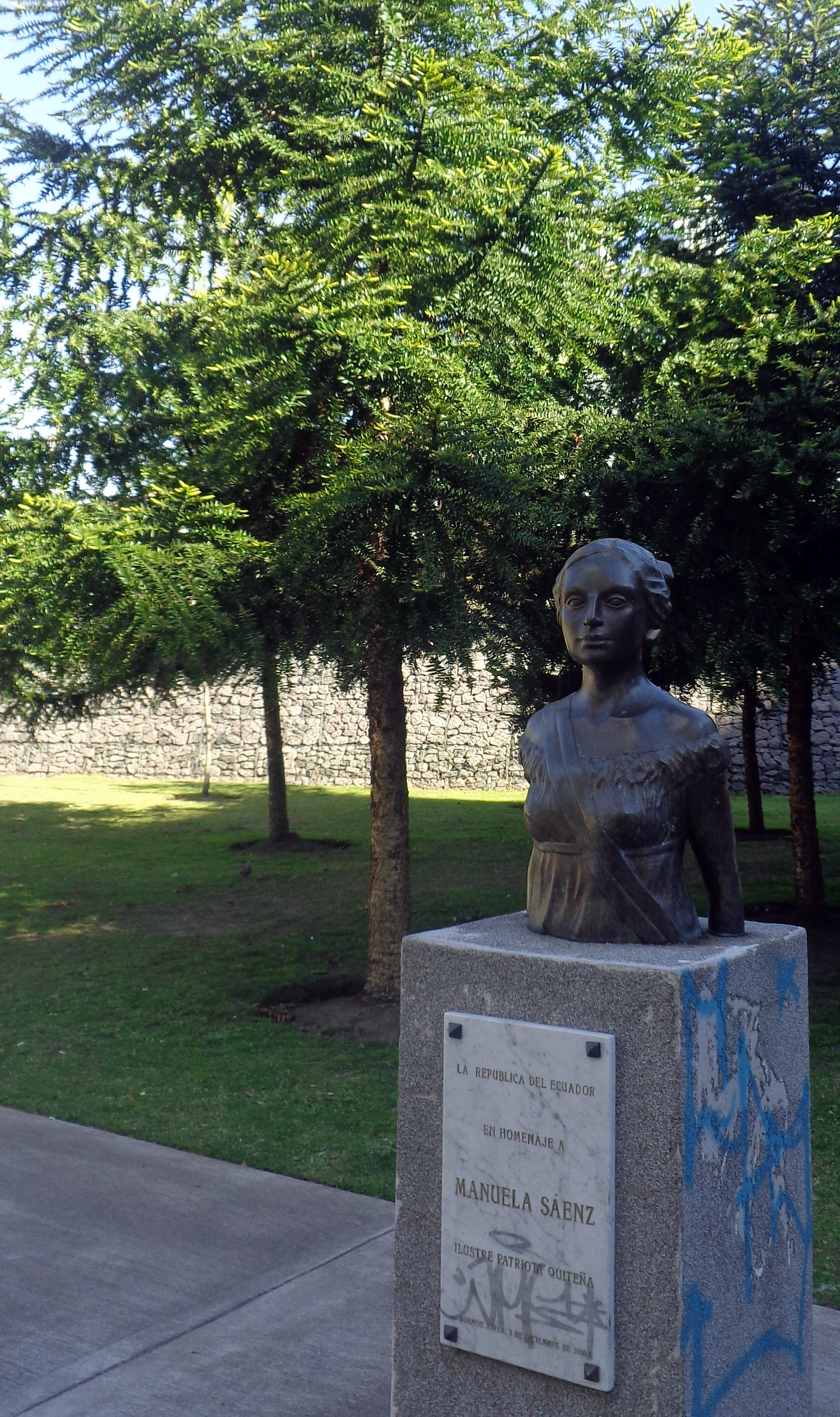
Bust of Manuela Sáenz in the Parque Mujeres Argentinas.

After the revolution, Manuela effectively faded from literature. Between 1860 and 1940 only three Ecuadorian writers wrote about her and her participation in the revolution, and these writings largely portrayed her as either exclusively the lover of Simón Bolívar or as incapable and wrongfully participating within the political sphere. These portrayals also assured her femininity as a mainstay of her characterization. However, the 1940s created a significant shift in how she was viewed and characterized. Literature like Papeles De Manuela Saenz, 1945, by Vicente Lecuna, which was a compilation of documents regarding the life of Bolívar, effectively disproved popular stereotypes about Manuela. Ideas about her being sexually deviant, hyper feminine and incapable were replaced by more favorable portrayals as the 20th century progressed.

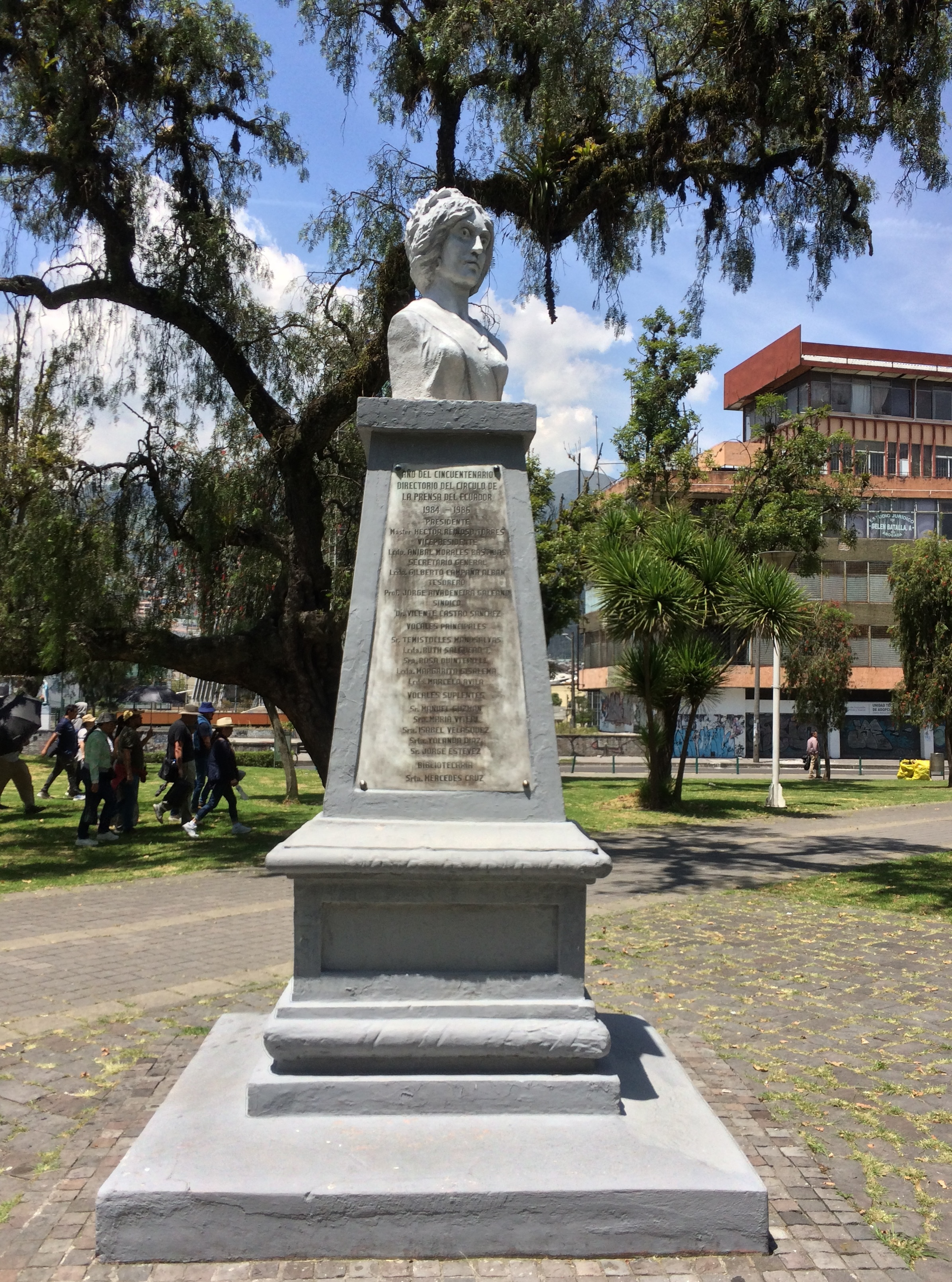
Bust of Manuela Sáenz, La Alameda park (Quito).

The later 20th century generated shifts in her portrayals that were consistent with ideological shifts within Latin America, like the increase of feminism of the 1980s and nationalism of the 1960s – 1970s. Portrayals within the fictional The General in His Labyrinth by Gabriel García Márquez and the nonfictional Alfonso Rumazo's Manuela Saenz La Libertadora del Libertador contributed to her effective humanization within popular culture and helped politicize her image. Alfonso Rumazo’s novel was especially poignant for its ideas of Pan-American Nationalism that were represented through Manuela's participation within the wars of independence. Manuela became increasingly popular with radical Latin American feminist groups subsequently, her image was commonly used as a rallying point for Indo-Latina causes of the 1980s. The popular image of Manuela riding horseback in men's clothing, popularized by her portrayal in The General in His Labyrinth, was re-enacted by female demonstrators in Ecuador in 1998.

There was a gathering of feminists in Paita on September 24, 1989, organized by Nella Martinez which encouraged the recognition of Manuela Saenz and paid homage to her. This was known as the "Primer Encuentro con la Historia: Manuela Saenz". All participants swore to follow her example by rallying against sexual, racial and class discrimination, and other injustices. They saw Saenz as a feminist heroine.

On 25 May 2007 the Ecuadorian government symbolically gave Saenz the rank of General.

=== Museo Manuela Sáenz ===
The Museo Manuela Sáenz is a museum in Old Town, Quito, that contains personal effects from both Sáenz and Bolívar to "[safeguard] the memories of Manuela Saenz, Quito's illustrious daughter". Located at Junin 709 y Montufar, Centro Histórico, Quito. Entrance to the museum is free with the purchase of one of the books about Manuela's life. Personal effects within the museum include letters, stamps, and paintings.

== Biographical writings ==
- "The Four Seasons of Manuela". Biography by Victor Wolfgang von Hagen (1974)
- "Manuela". Novel by Gregory Kauffman (1999). ISBN 978-0-9704250-0-3
- "Manuela Sáenz – La Libertadora del Libertador". Author: Alfonso Rumazo González (Quito 1984)
- "En Defensa de Manuela Sáenz". Authors: Pablo Neruda, Ricardo Palma, Victor von Hagen, Vicente Lecuma, German Arciniegas, Alfonso Rumazo, Pedro Jorge Vera, Jorge Salvador Lara, Jorge Enrique Adoum, Mario Briceño Perozo, Mary Ferrero, Benjamín Carrión, Jorge Villalba S.J., Leonardo Altuve, Juan Liscano (Quito)
- "Manuela Sáenz – presencia y polémica en la historia". Authors: María Mogollón and Ximena Narváez (Quito 1997)
- "la Vida Ardiente De Manuelita Sáenz". Author: Alberto Miramón (Bogota 1946)
- For Glory and Bolívar: The Remarkable Life of Manuela Sáenz. Biography by Pamela S. Murray. (Austin, TX 2008). ISBN 978-0-292-71829-6
- Our Lives Are the Rivers: A Novel. Author: Jaime Manrique.

== Biographical movies and opera ==
- Manuela Sáenz, directed by Diego Rísquez (2000) 97 minutes.
- Manuela y Bolívar, opera in two acts by composer/librettist Diego Luzuriaga (2006) 2-1/2 hours.
- Bolívar, Netflix Original Series (2019) 63 episodes.

== Cited sources ==
- Arismendi Posada, Ignacio (1983). Gobernantes Colombianos [Colombian Presidents] (second ed.). Bogotá, Colombia: Interprint Editors Ltd.; Italgraf.
- Murray, Pamela S. (2009). Pike, Fredrick B. [in Spanish] (ed.). For Glory and Bolívar : The Remarkable Life of Manuela Sáenz. Medelin: University of Texas Press. ISBN 978-0-292-77871-9.
