= Angelote, amor mío =

Short story by Javier Vásconez

- Author: Javier Vásconez
- Language: Spanish
- Published: 2021
- Publisher: El Conejo
- Publication place: Ecuador
- ISBN: 9788418178597
- OCLC: 1237697597

Angelote, amor mío is a short story by Ecuadorian writer Javier Vásconez, published in 1982 in the collection Ciudad lejana. It is the author's best-known story, and has been considered a classic of Ecuadorian literature. The plot takes place during the wake of a gay man named Jacinto, who was part of an upper class conservative Quito family, and is narrated through the interior monologue of his lover Julián, who recalls Jacinto's life and criticizes the hypocrisy of the society of the time using metaphors and religious symbols.

The work follows a trend in 20th-century Ecuadorian literature of portraying homosexual characters in dark tragedies. It also marked a shift in the literary representation of homosexuality in Ecuador by openly depicting the characters' sexuality. Its publication was controversial at the time as a result.

== Publication ==
The story was published in 1982 by El Conejo publishing house as part of the short story collection Ciudad lejana (Distant City). Over the years it became one of Vásconez's most notable works, although the publication of the story caused controversy in Ecuadorian society at the time for portraying homosexuality and what the author pointed out as the double standards of Quito's upper class, at a time when same-sex relationships were still punishable by imprisonment in the country. The controversy continued after copies were sold in Mexico, and the Ecuadorian Ministry of Education banned its reading in schools. It was also criticized by conservative circles, who claimed that the story attacked “buenos modales” (good manners).

== See also ==
- LGBTQ literature in Ecuador
