= Maritza Cino =

Ecuadorian poet

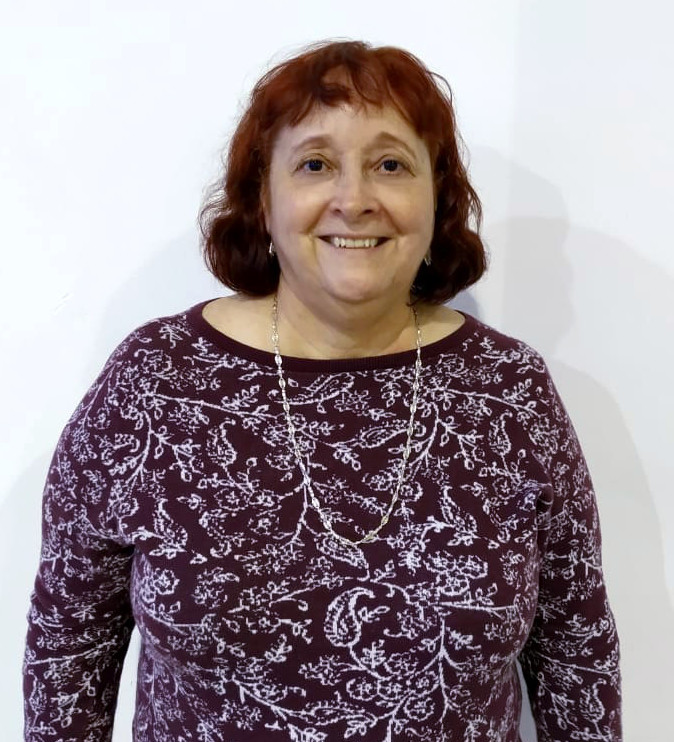
Cino during 2019 Guayaquil International Book Fair

Maritza Cino Alvear (born 1957) is an Ecuadorian poet.

Born in the port city of Guayaquil, she grew up with her grandparents as a result of her parents' divorce. Her grandparents were originally from the Calabrian village of Santa Doménica Talao but had moved to South America because of the First World War. Cino Alvear obtained a degree in Spanish language and literature from the Universidad Catolica Santiago De Guayaquil. She also studied at the Universidad Casa Grande. She has taught in various institutions in Guayaquil for several decades.

Emerging as a poet in her adolescence, Cino Alvear was influenced by the works of Kafka, Miller, Lawrence, Huidobro, Plath, Duras and Lezama Lima. Other Ecuadorian writers such as Ileana Espinel and Sonia Manzano Vela also had a strong impact on her work. She has published several collections of poetry and a volume of short fiction. Her work has been widely anthologized and has also been translated into English.

== Works ==
- Algo parecido al juego (1983)
- A cinco minutos de la bruma (1987)
- Invenciones del retorno (1992)
- Entre el juego y la bruma (1997)
- Infiel a la sombra (2000)
- Cuerpos guardados (2009)
- Poesía reunida (2013)
- Días frívolos (2016)
