= Solange Rodriguez =

Ecuadorian writer (born 1976)

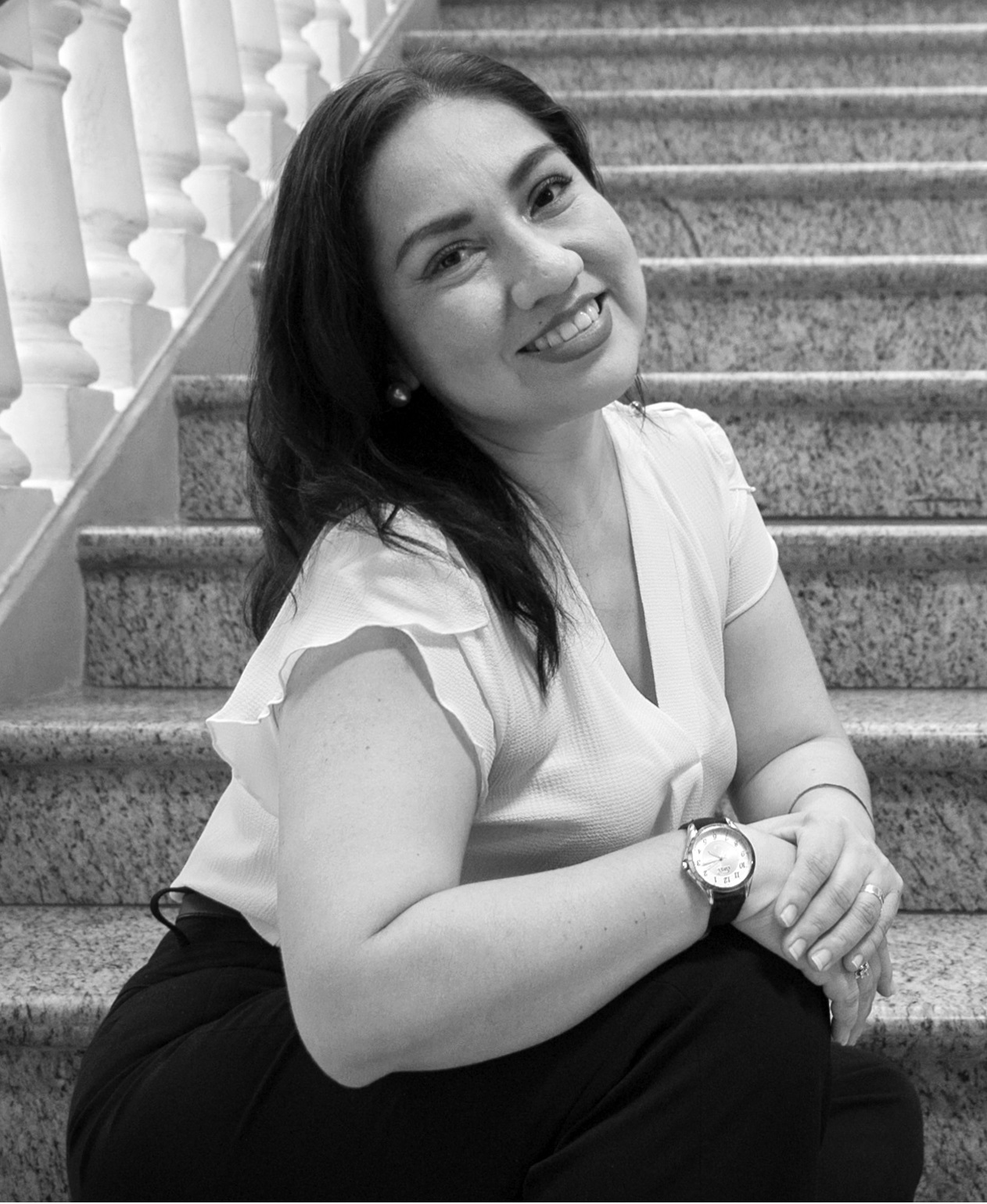
- Born: 1976 (age 48–49); Guayaquil, Ecuador
- Education: Universidad Católica de Santiago de Guayaquil Universidad Andina Simón Bolivar
- Occupation(s): Writer and professor
- Honours: Premio Joaquín Gallegos Lara (2010)
- Website: solangerodriguezpappe.com

Solange Rodriguez Pappe (Guayaquil, 1976) is an Ecuadorian professor and short-fiction writer.

== Biography ==
Solange studied college at Universidad Católica de Santiago de Guayaquil, where she obtained a degree in literature, sharing classes with writers as María Fernanda Ampuero, Luis Carlos Mussó, among others. Later on, she did an MA in hispanic literature at Universidad Andina Simón Bolívar.

In 2018 she received an honorable mention at the National Literature Competition made by Casa de la Cultura Ecuatoriana presenting her storybook "La primera vez que vi un fantasma". The book was published by the Spanish publishing house Candaya, gathering 15 stories including topics such as nostalgia and hopelessness.

As a teacher, she has developed a long career as a professor of higher education in different universities around the country. In February 2017 she won the prize Premio Matilde Hidalgo as result of 20 years of academic experience in the area of Literary Arts.

She published her first book of short stories, Tinta sangre, in 2000 under the publishing house Gato Tuerto. This work was followed by Dracofilia (2005) and The Place of Apparitions (2007).

Her book Balas Perdidas won in 2010 the Joaquín Gallegos Lara Award for Best Storybook of the Year, awarded by the municipality of Quito, and the second place in the Pichincha Story Prize.

== Books ==
Short-story collections

- Tinta sangre (2000)
- Dracofilia (2005)
- El lugar de las apariciones (2007)
- Balas perdidas (2010)
- La bondad de los extraños (2014)
- Levitaciones (2017)
- La primera vez que vi un fantasma (2018)

Digital publications

- Caja de magia (2013)
- Episodio aberrante (2014)
