= Juan Carlos Cucalón =

Ecuadorian writer

- Born: 1963; Guayaquil, Ecuador
- Occupation: Writer

Juan Carlos Cucalón (Guayaquil, b. 1963) is an Ecuadorian writer and playwright.

== Literary career ==
Cucalón studied architecture and design, but soon felt inclined towards literature. Among his teachers were Huilo Ruales, Miguel Donoso Pareja, Augusto Monterroso and Hisako Nakamura. Many of his texts have appeared in anthologies and magazines, including Soho y Diners.

In 2007, he won first place in the Pablo Palacio Story Biennial with his story Miedo a U2.

His short story collection Surcos obtusos won the 2009 edition of the Luis Félix López National Literature Competition, in the short story genre. The jury, made up of Gilda Holst, Alicia Ortega Caicedo and Cecilia Vera, affirmed in their decision that the book brings together "a set of very well structured stories, with excellent handling of language, humor and narrative tensions," in addition to showing "an anecdotal agility and a certain originality in terms of the conformation of the characters and the theme." Among the themes of the book are homoeroticism and masculinities in Latin America.

In 2010 he premiered his play Exododedosexos, whose plot follows two transgender women named Malva Malabar and Simoné Bernardette who are preparing to stage a play by Tennessee Williams.

Cucalón is openly gay and throughout his career he has published many stories with characters belonging to sexual diversity, among which stories such a La niña Tulita stand out.

== See also ==
- LGBTQ literature in Ecuador
