= María Fernanda Ampuero =

Ecuadorian writer and journalist

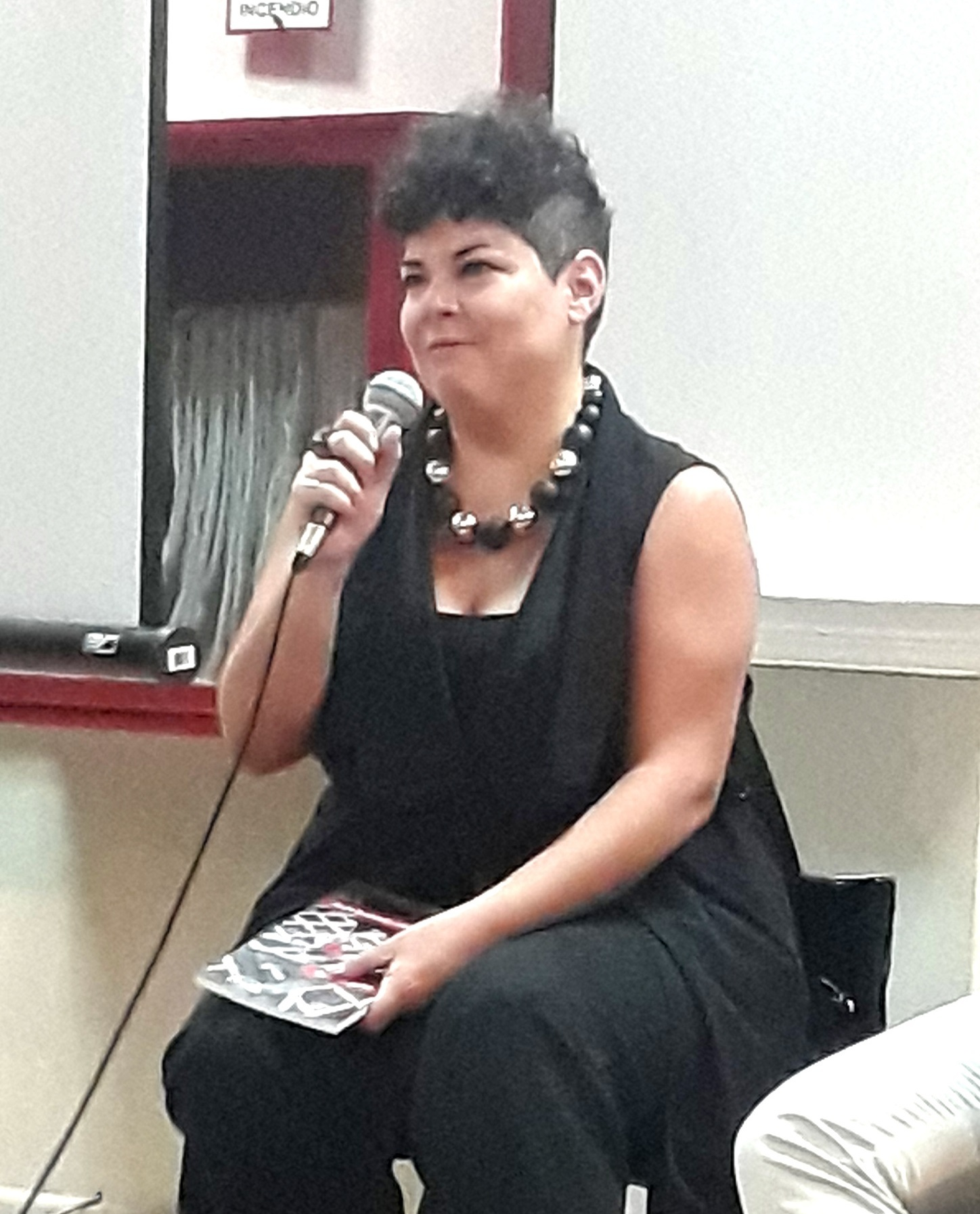
- Born: 14 April 1976 (age 50); Guayaquil, Ecuador
- Education: Universidad Católica de Santiago de Guayaquil
- Occupations: Writer and journalist
- Honours: Joaquín Gallegos Lara National Fiction Prize (2018)

María Fernanda Ampuero (Guayaquil, 14 April 1976) is an Ecuadorian feminist writer and journalist.

== Biography ==
Ampuero studied college at Universidad Católica de Santiago de Guayaquil, where she shared classes with writers such as Solange Rodríguez, Luis Carlos Mussó, among others. In December 2004 she traveled to Spain with the intention of chronicling the lives of Ecuadorian migrants, but decided to stay in Spain herself. For the next decade she wrote numerous articles about migrants' lives and their economic hardships that were published in magazines around Latin America and Europe. Some of these articles were later compiled in her first two non-fiction books: Lo que aprendí en la peluquería (2011) and Permiso de residencia (2013).

In 2012 she was named one of the 100 most influential Latin-Americans in Spain. She also won an award for the best chronicle by the Organización Internacional de las Migraciones.

Pelea de gallos, her first short-story collection, was published in 2018 and quickly became a critic sensation. It was named one of the best 10 books of 2018 by the Spanish edition of The New York Times and won the Joaquín Gallegos Lara National Fiction Prize. The book, composed of 13 stories, explores topics such as violence, sexism and social inequality in Latin America through the eyes of women. It was translated as Cockfight by Frances Riddle and published by The Feminist Press in 2020.

== Works ==
María Fernanda Ampuero has published the following books:

- Lo que aprendí en la peluquería (2011), non-fiction
- Permiso de residencia (2013), non-fiction
- Pelea de gallos (2018), short-story collection. Translated as Cockfight (2020) by Frances Riddle.
- Sacrificios humanos (2021), short-story collection.
- Visceral (2024), essays. Translated by Frances Riddle and published by The Feminist Press in 2026.
