= Eduardo Varas =

Ecuadorian novelist, musician and journalist (born 1979)

Eduardo Varas (Guayaquil, 1979) is an Ecuadorian novelist, musician and journalist, currently living in Quito.

He studied Social Communication at the Catholic University of Santiago of Guayaquil and was a member of Miguel Donoso Pareja's Writer's Workshop. He has worked for various print media companies, such as the newspapers El Comercio, El Universo, El Expreso and El Telégrafo, and the magazines SoHo, Mundo Diners and Ecuador Infinito. In 2007, he published the book of short stories Conjeturas para una tarde and in 2008 was part of the online anthology El futuro no es nuestro along with several Latin American short story writers. He is the author of the novel Los descosidos (2010) and is about to publish his second volume of stories Freak to go.
