= Alicia Ortega Caicedo =

Ecuadorian professor, literary critic and editor

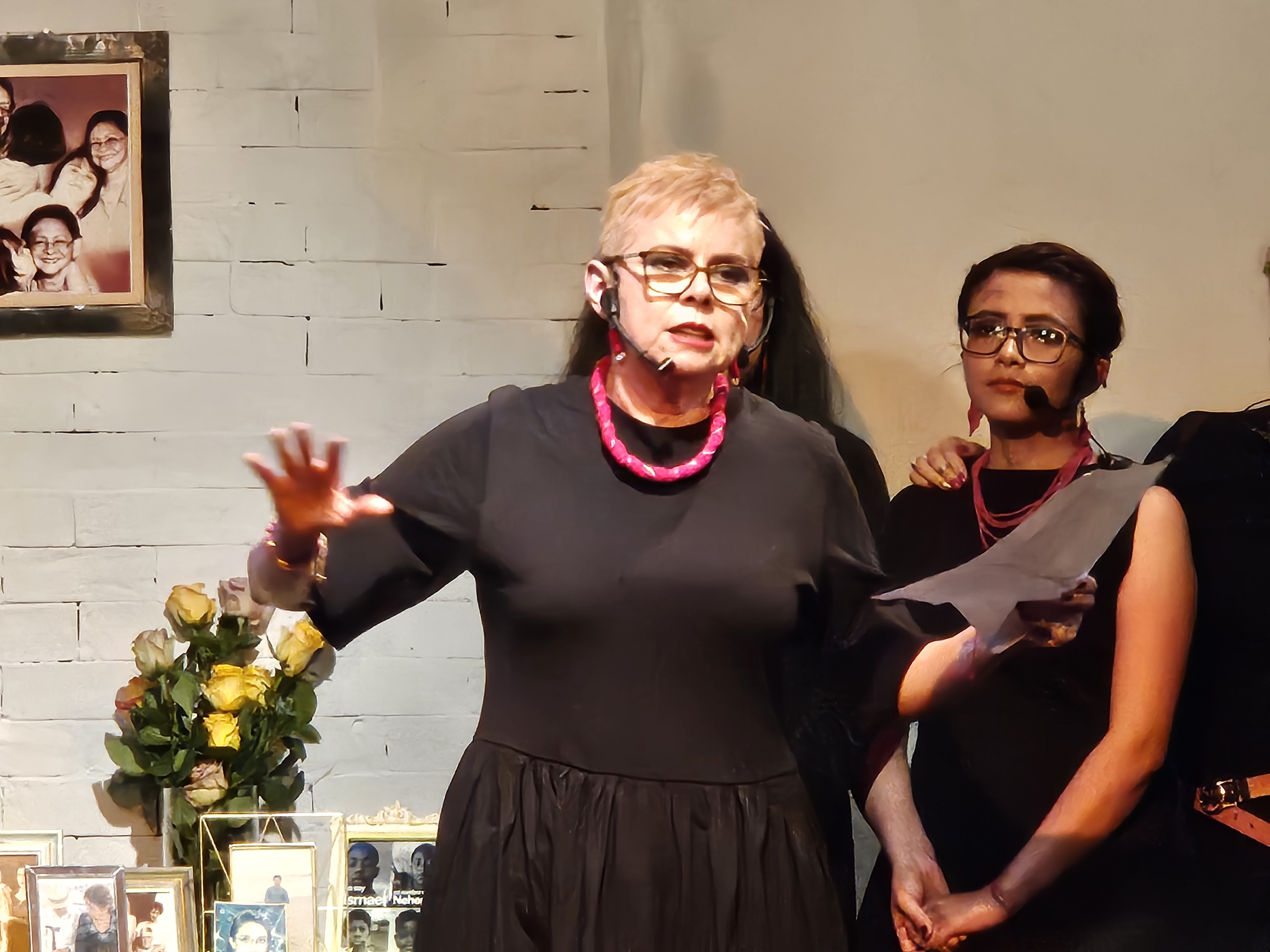
- Ortega in 2025
- Born: November 10, 1964 (age 61); Guayaquil, Ecuador
- Education: Moscow State University
- Occupations: Literary critic; professor; editor

Alicia Ortega Caicedo (Guayaquil, born November 10, 1964) is an Ecuadorian professor, literary critic and editor. She has been described as one of the most important voices of national literary criticism.

== Biography ==
She completed her higher education at Lomonosov University, where she obtained the title of philologist. She later obtained a master's degree in letters at the Simón Bolívar Andean University and a doctorate in Hispanic literature and languages at the University of Pittsburgh.

In her work as an editor, she has written prologues for and edited writers such as Alejandro Moreano, Jorge Icaza, Agustín Cueva, Pablo Palacio and Bolívar Echeverría.

In 2017, she published an extension of her doctoral thesis with the name of Fuga hacia dentro. La novela ecuatoriana en el siglo XX, published by the Simón Bolívar Andean University and Corregidor. In the work, Ortega makes a thorough review of the Ecuadorian narrative of the last century and of the critical analyzes and discrepancies that over the years have formed around it, particularly the dispute between realism and vanguardism. Among the authors studied in the book are Jorge Icaza, Pablo Palacio, Joaquín Gallegos Lara, Jorge Enrique Adoum and Alicia Yánez Cossío.

The work won the Isabel Tobar Guarderas Award, awarded by the municipality of Quito, for the best social science work of the year. It was also highly praised by Fernando Tinajero and Raúl Vallejo, who praised the book as the most monumental work of national literary criticism since La novela ecuatoriana (1948), by Ángel Felicissimo Rojas.

In 2022 she published the book Estancias, a hybrid work in which she mixed elements of a novel, a literary essay and a memoir. The book was inspired by the difficulties suffered by Ortega during the COVID-19 pandemic and addresses issues such as loneliness, isolation, mourning and the separation that at that time she had with her romantic partner, writer María Auxiliadora Balladares.

== Works ==
- 2017: Fuga hacia dentro. La novela ecuatoriana en el siglo XX
- 2022: Estancias
- 2025: La materia del duelo
