= Huidobro =

Huidobro is a surname. Notable people with the surname include:

- Carolina Huidobro (1859/1860–1909) , Chilean teacher and suffragist
- Eleuterio Fernández Huidobro (1942–2016), Uruguayan guerrilla fighter and politician
- Gerardo Huidobro (born 1996), Peruvian swimmer
- Martín Arrau García-Huidobro (born 1979), Chilean industrial civil engineer and politician
- Norma Huidobro (born 1949), Argentine writer
- Pascual Ruiz Huidobro (1752–1813) Spanish colonial governor, active in Montevideo
- Vicente Huidobro (1893–1948), Chilean poet
- Zuleyma Huidobro (born 1978), Mexican politician

Other uses

- Huidobro, populated place in Burgos Province, Spain
- Villa Huidobro, populated place in Córdoba Province, Argentina
