= Agustin Cueva =

Ecuadorian author

Agustín Cueva
- Born: Agustín Cueva Dávila; September 23, 1937; Ibarra, Ecuador
- Died: May 1, 1992 (aged 54); Quito, Ecuador
- Occupations: Sociologist and literary critic

Agustín Cueva Dávila (Ibarra, September 23, 1937 – Quito, May 1, 1992) was an Ecuadorian Marxist sociologist.

He had great interest in dependency theory and was at the center of many political debates both within Ecuador and throughout Latin America. He received the Essay Award from the Siglo XXI Publishing House for his book El desarrollo del capitalismo en América Latina (1977; The Development of Capitalism in Latin America). In addition to writing many essays on the social, political and cultural issues of South America, Cueva was a professor at the Central University of Ecuador, President of the Latin American Sociological Association, and directed the Graduate Studies Division of the Department of Political and Social Sciences at the National Autonomous University of Mexico.

He died of cancer in Quito on May 1, 1992.

== Works ==
- Entre la Ira y la Esperanza, 1967.
- Dos estudios literarios, 1968.
- Literatura ecuatoriana, 1968.
- El proceso de dominación política en el Ecuador, 1972.
- El desarrollo del capitalismo en América Latina, 1977.
- Teoría social y procesos políticos en América Latina, 1979.
- Lecturas y rupturas, 1986.
- La teoría marxista, 1987.
- Tiempos conservadores. América Latina y la derechización de Occidente -compilador-, 1987.
- Las democracias restringidas de América Latina en la frontera de los años 90, 1989.
- Literatura y conciencia histórica en América Latina, 1994.
