= Javier Vásconez =

Ecuadorian novelist, short story writer and editor

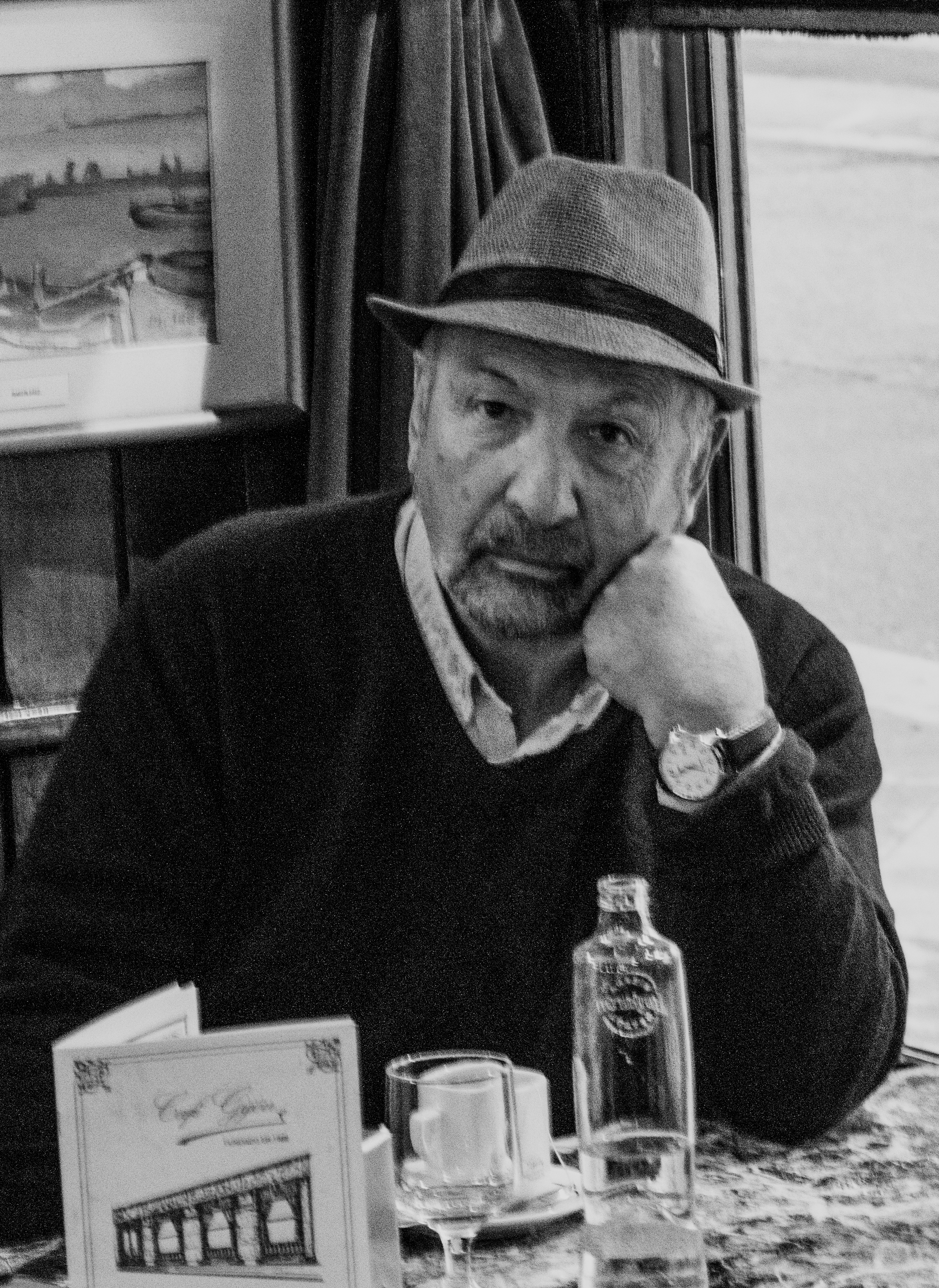
Javier Vásconez

Javier Vásconez (born 1946 in Quito) is an Ecuadorian novelist, short story writer, and editor.

His stories have been translated into English, French, German, Swiss, Hebrew, Bulgarian, and Greek.

In 2022 he was awarded the Premio Eugenio Espejo prize for literature.

== Works ==
=== Novels ===
- El secreto (1996)
- El viajero de Praga (1996)
- La sombra del apostador (1999) Finalist of the Rómulo Gallegos Prize (2001, Caracas, Venezuela)
- El retorno de las moscas (2005)
- Jardín Capelo (2007)
- La piel del miedo (2010) Nominated for the Rómulo Gallegos Prize
- La otra muerte del doctor (2012)

=== Short story books ===
- Ciudad lejana (1982) Finalist of the Casa de las Américas Prize (Cuba)
- El hombre de la mirada oblicua (1989) Joaquín Gallegos Lara National Fiction Prize (Ecuador, 1990)
- Un extraño en el puerto (1998)
- Invitados de honor (2004)
- El secreto y otros cuentos (Campaña de Lectura Eugenio Espejo, 2004)
- Estación de lluvia (antología) (2009)

=== Books contain his short stories ===
- Café Concert (Acuario, 1996)
- Thecla Teresina (Paradiso Editores, 2004)
- Angelote, amor mío (Doble Rostro, 2011)
