= Victoria Vaccaro García =

Ecuadorian poet (born 1998)

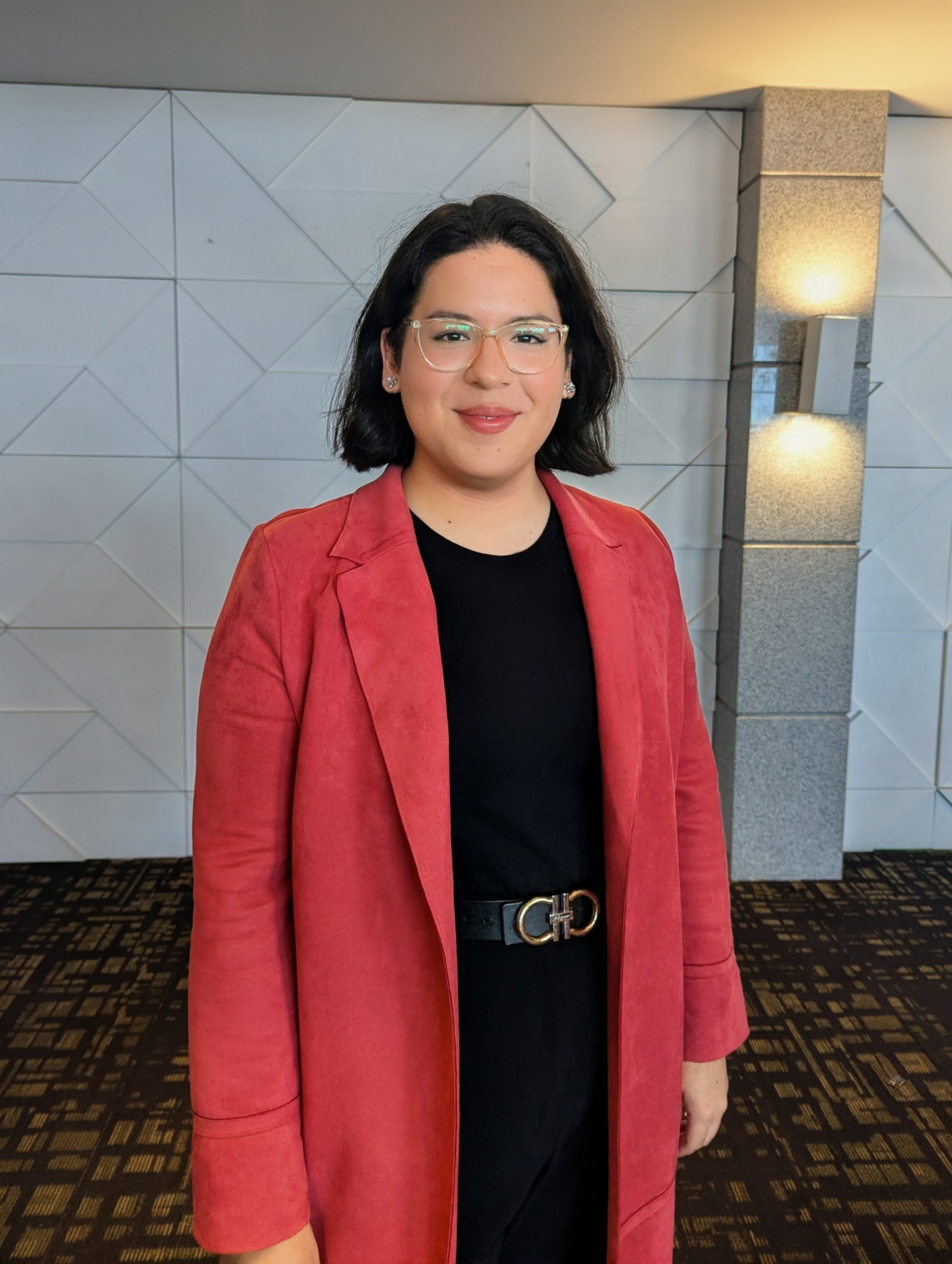
- Vaccaro García in 2025
- Born: 1998 (age 27–28); Guayaquil, Ecuador
- Occupation: Writer
- Writing career
- Language: Spanish
- Genre: Poem

Victoria Vaccaro García (Guayaquil, b. 1998) is an Ecuadorian poet.

== Biography ==
She published her first work, the poetry book Árbol ginecológico (Gynecological tree), in 2020 with fanzine publisher Crímenes en Venus (Crimes on Venus). Subsequently, a new edition was published by Libero publishing house in 2021. The work, which among other topics addresses motherhood symbolically, was recommended by the newspaper El Universo as a book to read during Pride month.

That same year, she received an honorable mention in the fourteenth edition of the Ileana Espinel Cedeño National Poetry Contest, whose first place was won by the poet Andrea Rojas.

In 2022, she won the Ana María Iza International Poetry Prize with her work Breve mitología del cuerpo original (Brief Mythology of the Original Body), which Vaccaro submitted under the pseudonym Opalina Desirée Azucena Uva. The jury, which was formed by writers Sara Vanegas Coveña, Juan Suárez Proaño and Ricardo Montiel, said about the work: “It is a collection of poems that confronts us with the necessary question about the wounds and triumphs that build identity.” The book was published by Casa Editora and El Ángel Editor and presented during that year's edition of the Encuentro Internacional de Poesía en Paralelo Cero (International Poetry Meeting at Paralelo Cero). Among the personalities who praised the poetry book was the writer Raúl Vallejo, who described it as a work about LGBT identity in which "nature becomes a sensorial presence that walks with the lyrical speaker in her transition.

=== Personal life ===
Vaccaro Garcia is a trans woman and became aware of her gender identity at a young age.

== Works ==
Poems

- Árbol ginecológico (Gynecological tree) (2020)
- Breve mitología del cuerpo original (Brief mythology of the original body) (2022)
