= Natasha Salguero =

Ecuadorian writer and journalist (born 1952)

Natasha Salguero Bravo (born 1952) is an Ecuadorian novelist, essayist, poet, and journalist. In 1989 she won the Aurelio Espinosa Pólit National Literary Prize for her novel Azulinaciones, which she published under a masculine pseudonym. Salguero thus became the first woman to win this award.

== Early life ==
Salguero was born in 1952 in Quito, the fifth daughter of Sixto Salguero, a stage actor, and María Bravo, a professor of history and geography.

As a child, she attended the Colegio Americano de Quito. After graduating, she enrolled in the Central University of Ecuador, where she obtained a bachelor's degree in 1973. She subsequently obtained a PhD from the Pontifical Catholic University of Ecuador.

== Career ==
Salguero's journalism career began in 1974, and she worked for such magazines as Vistazo and Hogar. She also worked for the publications Nueva, Diario Hoy, El Comercio, and Trazos.

She has also worked as a translator for the Ecuadorian government. In 1993 she became the director of the National Cultural Fund, and in 1994 she was named national director of culture. In 2007 she was chosen as the president of the Ecuadorian Society of Writers, a position she held until 2009.

In 1984, she wrote El Jardín de los Grifos. The writer Miguel Donoso Pareja selected it for an anthology that was never released. Instead, in 1989 Salguero revised the text and retitled it Azulinaciones. It is considered her most important work, dealing with sex, drugs, alcohol, and the moral vacuum in the society of the period. Using a male pseudonym, Salguero submitted it for the Aurelio Espinosa Pólit National Literary Prize. It won, making Salguero the first female winner of the national prize.

In 1989 she also won the Gabriela Mistral Prize for Poetry. She also received special recognition from the National Union of Journalists in 2006.

Salguero is "considered one of the most important contemporary Ecuadorian writers."

== Works ==
=== Books ===
- 1989: Azulinaciones
- 1992: Mujeres en torno a un ataúd
- 1998: Mujeres contracorriente: voces de líderes indígenas (with Emma Cervone and Lucía Chiriboga)
- 2002: Nace una danza: una mirada a la danza en los años setenta en el Ecuador
- 2012: Canción de amor que se anida en mi pecho

=== Poetry ===
- 1985: Heréticos y eróticos
- 1992: Cantos
- 2001: Nave palabra
- 2005: No me digas que me amas.
- 2011: Jaula de signos
- 2013: Viaje: Mecánica y Pasión de los Objetos (with María Ángeles Pérez López)

=== Compilations ===
- 2007: Wilson Pico 40 años en escena (about her husband, the ballet dancer and theater actor Wilson Pico)
