= Zuleyma Huidobro =

Mexican politician

- Born: 30 June 1978 (age 47); Cuetzalan, Puebla, Mexico
- Occupation: Deputy
- Political party: MC

Zuleyma Huidobro González (born 30 June 1978) is a Mexican politician affiliated with the Convergence. As of 2013 she served as Deputy of the LXII Legislature of the Mexican Congress representing Puebla.
