= Sonia Manzano Vela =

Ecuadorian writer (born 1947)

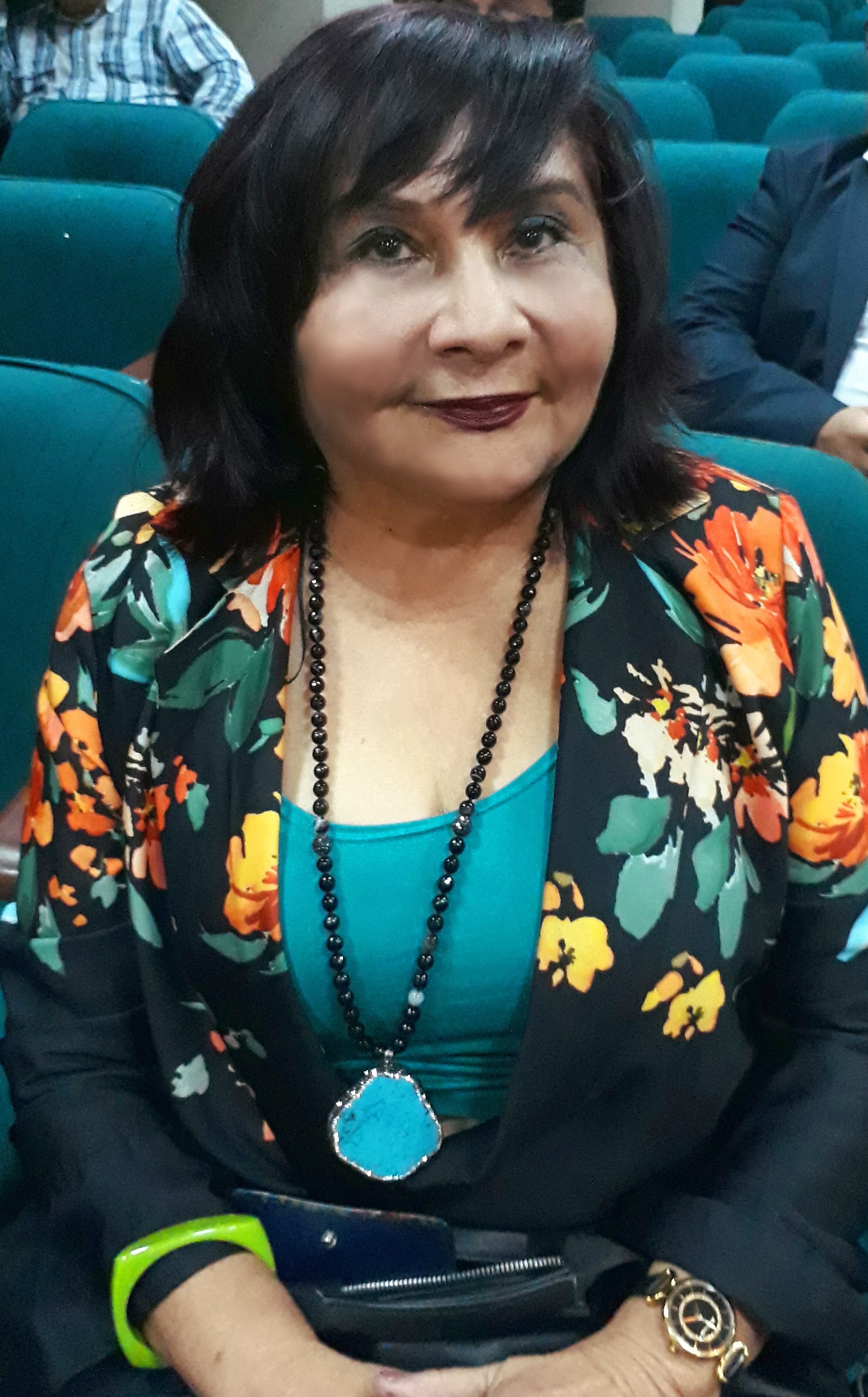
- Sonia Manzano Vela in 2018
- Born: February 27, 1947 (age 79) Guayaquil, Ecuador
- Occupation: Writer, poet
- Language: Spanish
- Genre: Poetry, novel, short story
- Notable awards: Joaquín Gallegos Lara National Fiction Prize (1999)

Sonia Manzano Vela (born Guayaquil, 27 February 1947) is an Ecuadorian writer and poet.

== Literary career ==
She started her literary career when some of her poems appeared in the anthology Generación Huracanada (1970), which was also the name of a literary group of which Manzano was part. Her first poetry book was El nudo y el trino, printed in 1972. She then published Casi siempre las tardes (1974), La gota en el cráneo (1976), La semana que no tiene jueves (1978), El ave que todo lo atropella (1980), Caja musical con bailarina incluida (1984), Carcoma con forma de paloma (1986) and Full de reinas (1991), which achieved commercial success.

Other poetry books published by Manzano include Patente de corza (1997), Último regreso a Edén (2007) and Espalda mordida por el humo (2014).

Manzano also became a proficient short fiction writer, having obtained the 1989 Ecuadorian Feminist Short-Story Contest. Her book Flujo escarlata won the 1999 Joaquín Gallegos Lara National Fiction Prize in the category Best Short-Story Collection. Her second short fiction book, Trata de viejas (2015), contains 10 stories filled with black humor that dig into nostalgia, loneliness and other problems of old age.

Her first novel, Y no abras la ventana todavía, won the first prize in the "Bienal de Novela Ecuatoriana" contest in 1993. She subsequently published the novels Que se quede el infinito sin estrellas (2001) and Eses fatales (2005), which Manzano described as "a genocentric discourse in which esses and feces converge as the characteristics of the most profound loneliness" and that explore topics such as literary creations, solitude and lesbian love.

Her latest novel, Solo de vino a piano lento, was published in 2013 and was named by literary critic Antonio Sacoto as the best novel written by an Ecuadorian woman so far in the 21st century.

== Published works ==
=== Poetry ===
- El nudo y el trino (1972)
- Casi siempre las tardes (1974)
- La gota en el cráneo (1976)
- La semana que no tiene jueves (1978)
- El ave que todo lo atropella (1980)
- Caja musical con bailarina incluida (1984)
- Carcoma con forma de paloma (1986)
- Full de reinas (1991)
- Patente de corza (1997)
- Último regreso a Edén (2007)
- Espalda mordida por el humo (2014)

=== Novels ===
- Y no abras la ventana todavía (1993)
- Que se quede el infinito sin estrellas (2001)
- Eses fatales (2005)
- Solo de vino a piano lento (2013)

=== Short-story collections ===
- Flujo escarlata (1999)
- Trata de viejas (2015)
