= Roy Sigüenza =

Ecuadorian poet

Roy Sigüenza (born 1958) is an Ecuadorian poet. He was born in Portovelo, El Oro. He went to school in his hometown and attended the Universidad Católica de Quito for several semesters.

He has published several books such as Cabeza quemada (1985), Ocúpate de la noche (2001), Tabla de mareas (1998), La hierba del cielo, Cuatrocientos cuerpos and Abrazadero y otros lugares. His poems are included in anthologies of Ecuadorian and Latin American poetry. His work has been translated into English, Portuguese and Catalán.
