= Victor Wolfgang von Hagen =

American explorer (1908–1985)

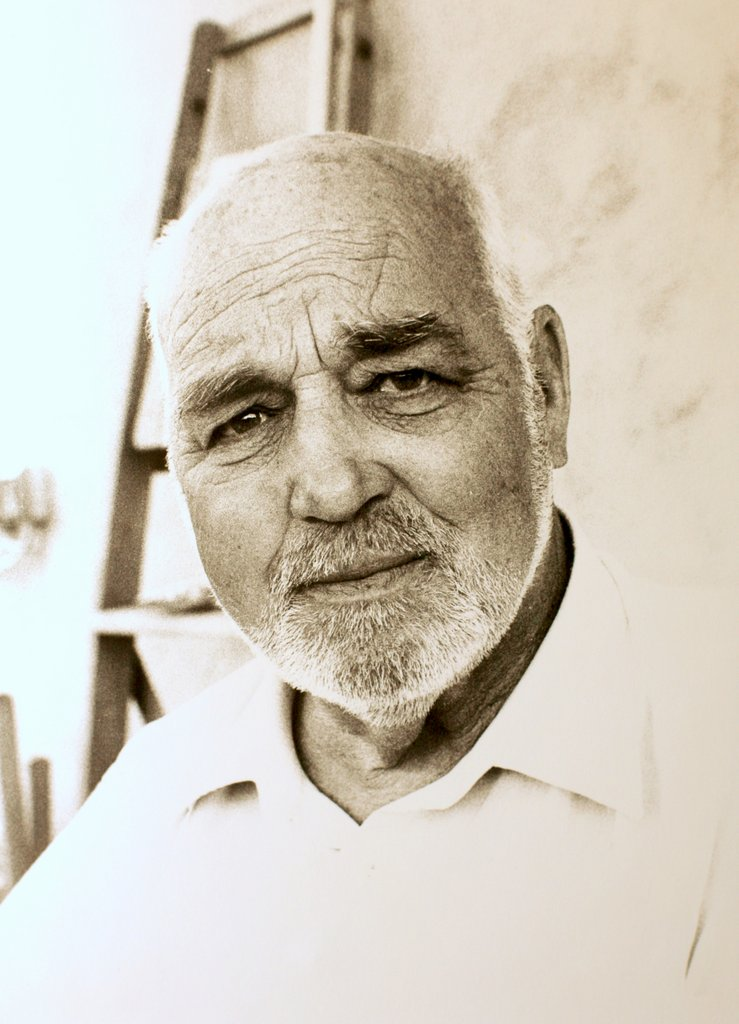
Victor von Hagen 1984 at Boggioli, Toscana

Victor Wolfgang von Hagen (St. Louis, Missouri, United States, February 29, 1908 – Italy, March 8, 1985) was an American explorer, writer, archaeological historian, naturalist and anthropologist who traveled in South America with his wife (Christine, later Silvia). Mainly between 1940 and 1965, he published a large number of widely acclaimed books about the ancient people of the Inca, Maya, and Aztecs.

Victor Wolfgang von Hagen was born on February 29, 1908, in St. Louis, Missouri, the son of Henry von Hagen and Eleanor Josephine (Stippe-Hornbach) Von Hagen. He attended Morgan Park Military Academy, a college preparatory school in Chicago. He then went to New York University, the San Francisco University of Quito, and the University of Göttingen. During World War II he served in the US Army, 13th Infantry.

His first book, Off With Their Heads (1937), was based on an eight-month stay with a tribe of head-hunters in Ecuador. He accompanied some of their war parties and witnessed the process of shrinking heads. Later he traveled through Honduras and Guatemala in search of the elusive quetzal, a bird once revered by the ancient Aztecs and Mayas. He recorded his experiences in his next book, Quetzal Quest: The Story of the Capture of the Quetzal, the Sacred Bird of the Aztecs and the Mayas (1939).

As a naturalist he was very knowledgeable of the Galapagos Islands and wrote the first comprehensive study of the giant tortoise. He was also an expert on the islands' plant life. Von Hagen was awarded the Orden de Merito by the Republic of Ecuador for his conservation work in the Galapagos.

In the early 1950s, he went for a two-year exploration of Peru's ancient Inca roads and found the only surviving suspension bridge of this trail.

His daughter, Adriana von Hagen, is co-director of a museum in Leimebamba (Peru).

== Works ==
- Alexander von Humboldt
- Off With Their Heads (1937)
- Ecuador the Unknown (1938)
- The Tsátchela Indians of Western Ecuador (1939)
- The Galapagos Islands and Charles Darwin: Notes on an Exhibition at the Bancroft Library (1939)
- Quetzal Quest - The Story of the Capture of the Quetzal, the Sacred Bird of the Aztec and the Mayas (1939)
- Jungle in the Clouds (1940)
- Treasure of the Tortoise islands (1940)
- Riches of South America (New World Neighbors) (1941)
- Riches of Central America (New World Neighbors) (1942)
- Miskito Boy (1943)
- Paper and Civilization (Scientific Monthly, vol. 57, 1943)
- Mexican Papermaking Plants (Journal of the New York Botanical Gardens, vol. 44, 1943)
- The Jicaque Indians of Honduras (1943)
- The Aztec and Maya Papermakers (1943)
- South America Called Them: Explorations of the Great Naturalists: La Condamine, Humboldt, Darwin, Spruce (1945)
- South American Zoo (1946)
- F. Catherwood 1799-1854 - Architect-Explorer of Two Worlds (1946)
- Maya Explorer: John Lloyd Stephens and the Lost Cities of Central America and Yucatán (1947)
- The Green World of the Naturalists - A Treasury of Five Centuries of Natural History in South America (1948)
- A Guide to Lima, the Capital of Peru (Guides to Peru) (1949)
- A Guide to Cusco (Guides to Peru) (1949)
- A Guide to Sacsahuaman: The Fortress of Cusco (Guides to Peru) (1949)
- Ecuador and the Galápagos Islands: A History (1949)
- Frederick Catherwood, Architect (1950)
- Huancayo and Ayacucho (His Guide to Peru) (1950)
- A Guide to Guayaquil (Guides to Ecuador) (1950)
- A Guide to St Vincent (1950)
- A Guide to Machu Picchu (Guides to Peru) (1952)
- The Four Seasons Of Manuela. A Biography. The Love Story of Manuela Sáenz and Simón Bolivar (1952)
- Highway of the Sun (1955) - about an expedition of discovery of the ancient roads of the Inca
- A Guide to Cusco and Machu Picchu (Guides to Peru) (1956)
- Realm of the Incas (1957)
- The Aztec: Man and Tribe (1958)
- A Guide to Sacsahuaman: Ollontay-Tambo and Pisac (1958)
- The World of the Maya (1960)
- Maya, Land of the Turkey and the Deer (1960)
- The Ancient Sun Kingdoms of the Americas: Aztec, Maya, Inca (1961)
- The Incas: People of the Sun (1961)
- A Chronological Chart of Pre-Columbian Indian Cultures of the Americas and World Events (1962)
- The Desert Kingdoms of Peru (1965)
- Roman Roads (1966)
- Roads that Led to Rome (1967)
- The Gold of El Dorado: The Quest for the Golden Man (1968)
- The Incas of Pedro De Cieza De Leon (1970)
- Search for the Maya: The Story of Stephens and Catherwood (1973)
- The Germanic People in America (1976)
- The Royal Road of the Inca (1976)
- Jicaque (1977)
- The Sun Kingdom of the Aztecs (1977)
- Cuzco and Machu Picchu (1979) ABC Pocket Guide de culo
- Capac ñan, Schicksalsstrasse der Inkas
