= Alfonso Rumazo González =

Ecuadorian writer and historian (1903–2002)

- Born: 1903; Latacunga, Ecuador
- Died: 2002 (aged 98–99); Caracas, Venezuela
- Occupation: Writer
- Writing career
- Notable works: "Manuela Sáenz – La Libertadora del Libertador" (Quito, 1984)

Alfonso Rumazo González (Latacunga, 1903 – Caracas, 2002) was an Ecuadorian writer, historian, essayist and literary critic.

== Biography ==
Alfonso Rumazo González was born in Latacunga, Ecuador in 1903. He lived in Venezuela since 1953, where he was a professor at the School of Humanities at the Central University of Venezuela and the Santa Maria University.

He was an Honorary Professor of the Simon Rodriguez Experimental National University. He was a member of the National Academy of History of Ecuador, corresponding member of the National Academy of History of Venezuela, a member of Ecuadorian Academy of Language, a corresponding member of the Royal Spanish Academy, and corresponding member of the Venezuelan Academy of Language. He was a member of UNESCO - Division of Human Rights (Specialist).

He was an active writer. He published more than 6,000 articles in Latin American and European journals and magazines. He also published more over 30 books in various fields (poetry, fiction, literary criticism, historical essays). He was nominated for the Nobel Prize for Literature but did not win.

He was awarded Ecuador's highest prize Premio Eugenio Espejo, in the Science category, by the President of Ecuador in 1997.

== Selected works ==
Biographical works

- Manuelita Sáenz, la libertadora del Libertador
- Bolívar
- Gobernantes del Ecuador
- O'Leary, edecán del Libertador
- Miranda, protolíder de la independencia Americana

Literary criticism

- Siluetas líricas de poetas ecuatorianos

== Awards and recognition ==
- Orden del Libertador, Gran Cordón, Venezuela
- Orden Francisco de Miranda, Venezuela (primera clase)
- Orden Andrés Bello, Venezuela (primera clase)
- Orden Antonio José de Sucre, Venezuela (primera clase)
- Orden José de San Martín, Argentina
- Orden Nacional Al Mérito, Ecuador
- Orden Vicente Emilio Sojo, Venezuela (primera clase)
- Orden Cecilio Acosta, Venezuela (primera clase)
- Orden 27 de noviembre de 1820, Venezuela (primera clase)
