= Francisco Granizo Ribadeneira =

Ecuadorian poet (1925–2009)

- Born: November 8, 1925; Quito, Ecuador
- Died: January 21, 2009 (aged 83)
- Occupation: Poet

Francisco Granizo Ribadeneira (1925–2009) was an Ecuadorian poet born in Quito on November 8, 1925, and died on January 21, 2009. For some, he was considered a model for Ecuadorian religious lyrical poetry; his work surpasses an exact classification and in more than one occasion, it has been categorized as "intense poetry", a middle ground between eroticism, mysticism, and existentialism.

Of him, the critic Hernán Rodríguez Castelo: says, "I think that in a selection of the best Ecuadorian poets of this century, if there were ten or less, you couldn't miss Granizo. An exemplary and sustained lyrical trajectory, increasingly deeper and higher, has left him as the highest place within the slope of the current Ecuadorian lyrical poetry."

Granizo studied in San Gabriel High School and afterwards he continued his studies with a major in Law at the Central University of Ecuador. As a university student, he won the gold medal in a poetic competition in Riobamba. He was a renowned diplomat and he became the alternate representative before the OEA and responsible for business in Venezuela and Chile. Additionally, he worked as a professor in the Central University and directed the radio station of the Ecuadorian Cultural House.

He has published several books of poems By the Short Dust (1948), The Rock (1958), Nothing more than the verb (1969), Death and pursuit of death (1978), Sonets of total love and other poems (1990) and The Sound of your steps (2005); additionally to the novel The Pool (2002) and the dramatic poem Fedro (2005).
