= Rosa Campuzano =

Peruvian activist (1796 – 1851)

- Born: 13 April 1796; Guayaquil, Viceroyalty of New Granada
- Died: 1851 (aged 54–55); Lima, Peru
- Children: 1
- Parent(s): Felipa Cornejo; Francisco Herrera Campuzano

Rosa Campuzano Cornejo (13 April 1796 – 1851) was an activist affiliated with the cause of freedom in the struggle for the independence of Peru, born in Guayaquil, Viceroyalty of Peru on April 13, 1796 and died in Lima in 1851. She was called "the protectress" for being the mistress of General José de San Martín, the exalted "Protector of Peru."

== Biography ==
Rosa was the illegitimate daughter of Francisco Herrera Campuzano y Gutierrez, officer, rich cocoa producer, who conceived her with a "mulata" named Felipa Cornejo.

Rosita is described by the chroniclers as a beautiful woman with fair skin and blue eyes, intelligent, breezy and literate. She came to Lima in 1817, the 21 years old mistress of a wealthy Spaniard and soon she became well known in Lima's society. Her social circle was frequented by prominent people. She took advantage of her position as mistress of a royalist general to obtain military information that she supplied to the Peruvian patriot forces. She hid, in her house, official royal army deserters and then; she helped them to join the Patriot Military Forces. Because of this clandestine and subversive activities she was detained for several days. Also, for these activities and attend the same social circles she met Manuela Sáenz, establishing between them a great friendship and complicity in the conspiracy work. Also in 1818 was denounced to the Inquisition for having banned books.

On Saturday night, July 28, 1821, the Cabildo of Lima organized a party in the city hall in honor of San Martín and the proclamation of independence. The General and Rosita met there and the next day, Sunday, July 29, San Martin returned the deference with another dance, now in the halls of the Palace of the Viceroys and saw again the beautiful Guayaquil.

According to several testimonies Rosa and the General became lovers. When "the Protector" included her in the 112 women that received the Order of the Sun, the traditional society Lima considered it an affront. The day San Martín left Peru, they were barely able to say goodbye.

By 1832 Rosita began a relationship with the German businessman John Weniger, owner of two valuable shoe stores on the St. Augustine silversmiths' street. They had a son named Alexander Weniger Campuzano, who she did not raise because John took him when they ended their relationship.

In Rosa's testament she claims that she was married to Ernesto Gaber, who left her by going off to Europe, and to have a son named Alexander. Rosa died almost in poverty in 1851, at age 55. She was buried in the church of San Juan Bautista de Lima.

== Bibliography ==
- Tradiciones peruanas completas, by Ricardo Palma, Compiled by Edith Palma. Published by Aguilar, 1968, Lima, Peru.
- El general San Martín: su vida y su acción continental en relación con la historia de Bolívar, by Alfonso Rumazo González. Published by Ministerio de Educación, Dirección de Información y Relaciones, División de Publicaciones, 1982, Lima, Peru.
- El Ecuador profundo: mitos, historias, leyendas, recuerdos, anécdotas y tradiciones del país, by Rodolfo Pérez Pimentel. Published by Edit. de la Universidad de Guayaquil, 198
