= El Telégrafo (Ecuador) =

Ecuadorian newspaper

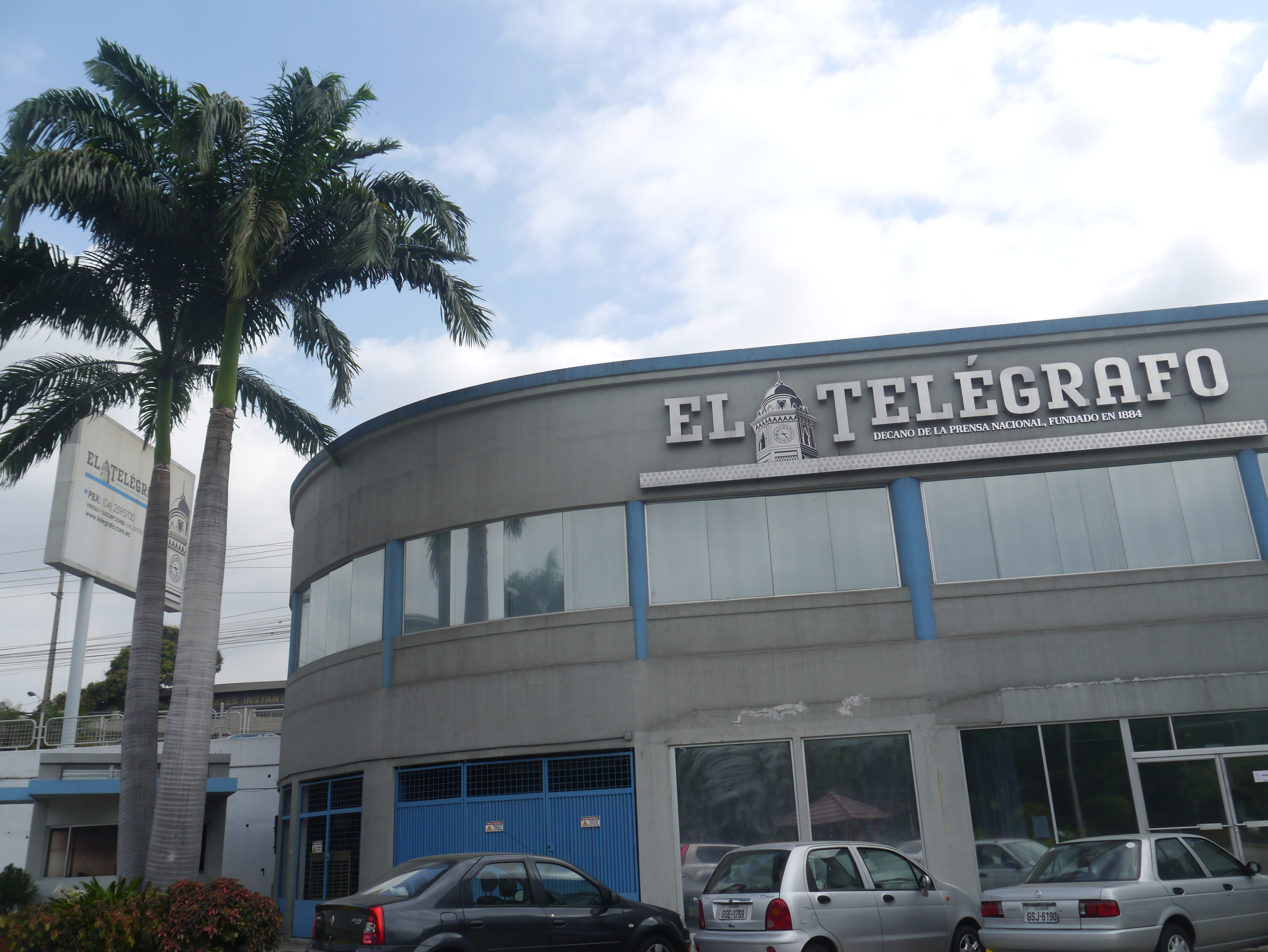
- Offices in Guayaquil
- Type: Daily newspaper
- Format: 41×28cm
- Owner: Ecuador Government
- Editor: Orlando Pérez
- Founded: 1884
- Political alignment: Public
- Headquarters: Guayaquil
- Website: http://www.eltelegrafo.com.ec

El Telégrafo is a Spanish-language daily newspaper in Guayaquil, Ecuador founded in 1884. It is the oldest newspaper in Ecuador.
