= Ministry of Education (Ecuador) =

The Ministry of Education's logo

The Ministry of Education (Spanish: Ministerio de Educación) is a ministry of the government of Ecuador, headquartered in Quito.

Its current Minister is Gilda Alcívar since November 2025.
