= María Auxiliadora Balladares =

Ecuadorian writer (born 1980)

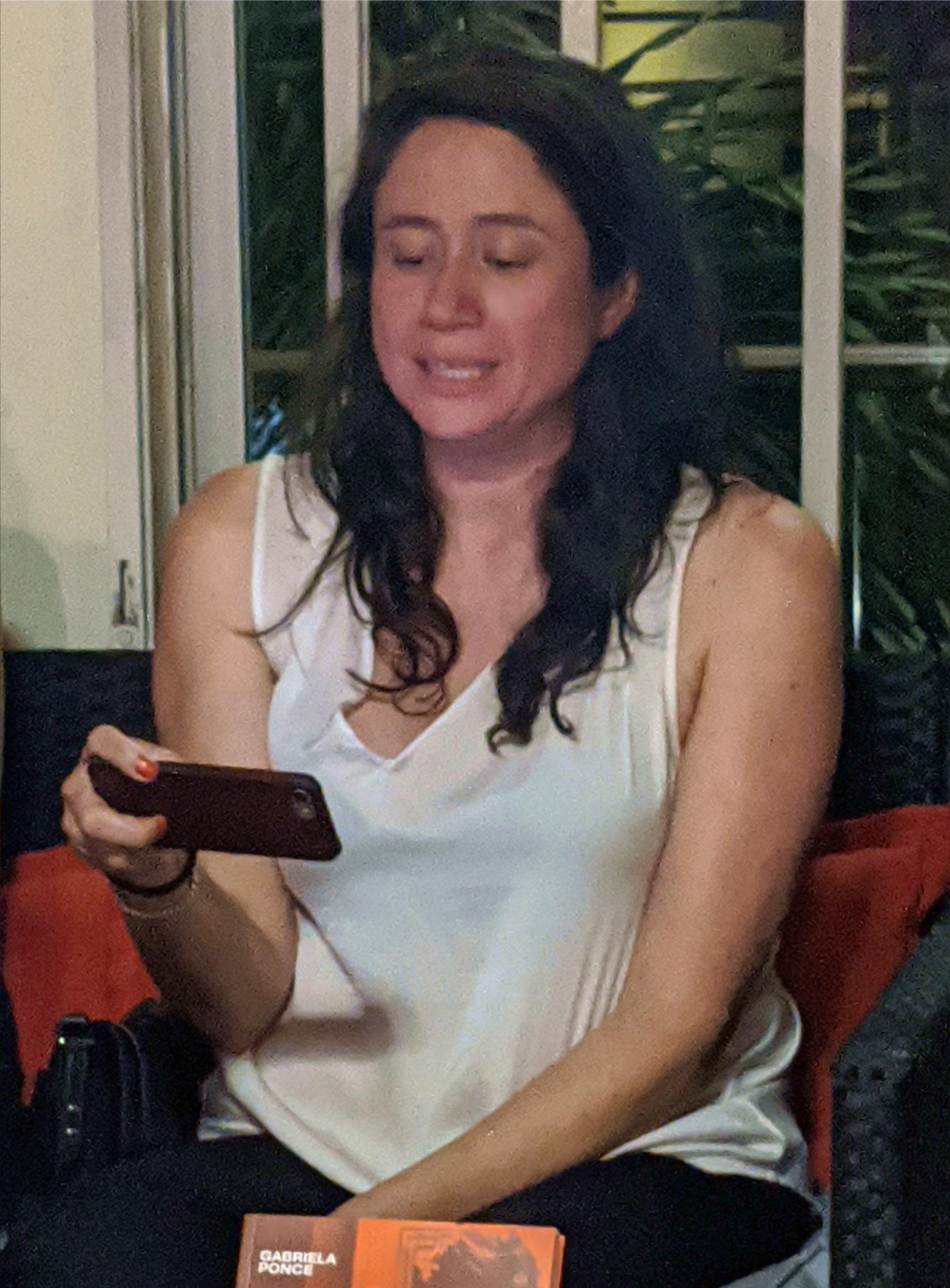
- In 2020
- Born: María Auxiliadora Balladares Uquillas; 1980 (age 45–46); Guayaquil, Ecuador
- Education: Universidad San Francisco de Quito; Pontifical Catholic University of Ecuador; University of Pittsburgh
- Occupations: Writer, professor
- Awards: Jorge Carrera Andrade Award (2023)

María Auxiliadora Balladares Uquillas (born 1980) is an Ecuadorian writer and professor at Universidad San Francisco de Quito.

== Biography ==
María Auxiliadora Balladares was born in Guayaquil in 1980. She received bachelor of arts degrees in sociology and liberal arts at Universidad San Francisco de Quito, followed by a master's at the Pontifical Catholic University of Ecuador. She earned a PhD in Latin American literature at the University of Pittsburgh in 2018 with the dissertation Una rara inocencia: el debilitamiento de la metáfora en Dalton, Alegría, Ledesma Vázquez y Watanabe (A Rare Innocence: The Weakening of the Metaphor in Dalton, Alegría, Ledesma Vázquez, and Watanabe).

She began her literary career by publishing stories that appeared in various local anthologies. With the story "Jamón serrano", she won second place at the tenth Pablo Palacio Short Story Biennial.

Her first book was the short story collection Las vergüenzas (The Shames), published in 2013. It is made up of ten stories, and was well received by Ecuadorian critics. The story "En el sótano" (In the Cellar), originally written in 1999, tells the story of two children who discover their father's homosexual relationship with the man he had passed off as his brother for years.

In 2017, Balladares published the poetry collection Animal, which was inspired by her affinity for wildlife and her relationship with the wilderness. The work took second place at the seventh Cuenca Festival de la Lira.

Her poetry collection Guayaquil won first prize at the 2017 Pichincha Poetry Awards. The work, published in 2019 by the Provincial Council of Pichincha, brings together 22 poems that present the author's experiences during a trip to Guayaquil as a poetic journal. The writer and literary critic Daniela Alcívar Bellolio highlighted the book's exploration of themes such as the female body, loss, and lesbian love. She also pointed out the poem "A mí también me gusta Marosa di Giorgio" (I Also Like Marosa di Giorgio) as one of the most powerful in the work.

At the end of 2022, Balladares published the poetry collection Acantile duerme piloto, which included twelve love poems. With it, she won the 2023 Jorge Carrera Andrade Award, given by the municipality of Quito to the best poetry book of the year.

== Works ==
- Las vergüenzas (2013), short stories
- Todos creados en un abrir y cerrar de ojos (2015), essay

=== Poetry ===
- Animal (2017)
- Guayaquil (2019)
- Caballo y arveja (2021)
- Acantile duerme piloto (2022)
