= Pedro Jorge Vera =

Ecuadorian writer and politician

Pedro Jorge Vera (1914 in Guayaquil – 1999) was an Ecuadorian writer and Communist Party of Ecuador politician. He contributed to several newspapers and magazines of controversial character "La Calle", with the writer Alejandro Carrión, as well as "La Mañana". He remained throughout his life a close friend of Cuban president Fidel Castro. Vera was the paternal uncle of Prima Ballerina Noralma Vera Arrata.
