= Joaquín Gallegos Lara National Fiction Prize =

Ecuadorian annual fiction prize

The Joaquín Gallegos Lara National Fiction Prize (Spanish: Premio Nacional de Narrativa Joaquín Gallegos Lara) is awarded yearly by the Municipality of Quito, Ecuador to the best national works in three categories: the short story, the novel, and theater.

The award is named after the Ecuadorian novelist Joaquín Gallegos Lara (1909-1947).
