= A Sunny Place for Shady People =

2024 short story collection by Mariana Enríquez

- English-language cover
- Author: Mariana Enríquez
- Original title: Un lugar soleado para gente sombría
- Translator: Megan McDowell
- Illustrator: Pablo Gerardo Camacho
- Cover artist: Luke Bird
- Language: Spanish
- Genre: Horror fiction; Gothic fiction; body horror
- Set in: Argentina; United States
- Publisher: Anagrama (1st Spanish ed.), Hogarth (1st English ed.)
- Publication date: 6 March 2024
- Publication place: Barcelona, Spain
- English publication date: 2024
- Pages: 232
- Awards: World Fantasy Award—Collection
- ISBN: 9780593733271

A Sunny Place for Shady People (Spanish: Un lugar soleado para gente sombría) is a 2024 collection of Gothic horror short stories by Argentine author Mariana Enríquez. Originally published in Spanish by Anagrama, the English translation by Megan McDowell was published by Hogarth in the US and Granta in the UK.

The collection won the 2024 World Fantasy Award for a collection.

== Plots ==
=== "My Sad Dead" ===
Emma, a doctor, speaks to ghosts in her neighborhood, which is bordered by subsidized housing. She hears her mother, who died of cancer in the home they shared, screaming, and soothes her by singing. As violent crime in the neighborhood increases, more ghosts appear each night. Many of the residents become distressed, and ask Emma to help placate the dead.

=== "A Sunny Place for Shady People" ===
A magazine journalist from Buenos Aires returns to Los Angeles, where her partner Dizz had died of a drug overdose. Refusing her editor's request for an article on P-22, an escaped mountain lion, she pitches a piece on Elisa Lam. Lam was a tourist found dead in a water tank on a hotel roof near the tent city of Skid Row. The narrator joins and secretly records a sect holding a séance for Lam on the hotel roof.

Afterwards, the narrator visits her friends in Laurel Canyon, where they spot P-22. Her friend believes the puma's presence is a visit from Dizz.

The next night, the narrator attends another séance on the hotel roof, and this time they hear pounding and a voice from within the water tank.

=== "Face of Disgrace" ===
Diego's mother relates to him that she was raped as a child by a whistling man who had backwards feet and no face. After their mother's death, Alex, his sister, gradually notices her facial features disappearing, and hears the whistle.

=== "Julie" ===
Julie's parents want to institutionalize her because she claims to have sex with ghosts. Her cousin helps her escape to a church named after occultist Marjorie Cameron.

=== "Night Birds" ===
The narrator, sister of a fictionalized version of artist Mildred Burton, describes their upbringing in Paraná. She describes their grandmother's punishments, and myths of women turned to birds as punishments. She explains that she has a disease making her rot while alive, while Millie has ketoacidosis. Millie finds a cat she believes to be a dead girl reincarnated as a tiger, which their grandmother kills. The narrator is sad when Millie moves to Buenos Aires to pursue an art career.

=== "Metamorphosis" ===
A woman has a uterine fibroid removed and then reinserted and fused to her spine.

=== "Hyena Hymns" ===
A man and his boyfriend Mateo visit a palace formerly used for torture, implied to be during Argentina's Infamous Decade. They find a pile of clothes and Mateo tries some on before running away.

The narrator chases him and finds him in a dark room full of beds, where a large man is holding a knife to Mateo's neck. The beds are depressed as if people are laying on them, and hyenas howl outside. The man with the knife cuts off his own ear, then, at the narrator's instruction, his nose and nearly his finger, before disappearing in the narrator's phone light.

=== "Different Colors Made of Tears" ===
A vintage clothes shop employee buys an old man's collection of his dead wife's clothes. Returning to the shop, the employees research the man, Noah, and find that his wife Susana had left him forty years before her death, and he had attacked her next partner. The employees and customers try on the clothes, which cause wounds to appear on their bodies until removed.

Noah emails the shop to tell them that he drew with a knife on the dresses the ways he wished to have killed his wife. The narrator quits but the shop owner keeps the clothes.

=== "The Suffering Woman" ===
Paola, a hypochondriac, sees glimpses of a dying woman in her home.

=== "The Refrigerator Cemetery" ===
As children, the narrator, her friend Daniel, and their neighbor Gustavo take turns seeing how long they can stay locked in a refrigerator. Whilst locked inside, Gustavo has a seizure and the others do not remove him until it is over. They then return him to the refrigerator.

The narrator returns as an adult, reflecting on her nightmares following Gustavo's death. The refrigerator cemetery is due for demolition and she intends to remove and bury Gustavo's body, but cannot find it. She sees a man in the distance and tries to escape, but cannot find an exit. The man comes to help her up.

=== "A Local Artist" ===
Couple Ivana and Lautaro travel to stay in General Moore, a small, isolated town that in 1997 had its rail station closed. On the way, they see a roadside shrine to the Difunta Correa, a folk saint who died of thirst in the desert, and leave an empty bottle. In General Moore, Ivana finds a bloodstained hammock and Lautaro meets a person who looks like a child but claims to be thirty-three. At a restaurant, a young waiter reminisces about leaving coins on tracks for trains to flatten, but Lautaro thinks he is too young to have predated the railway closure.

The couple visit the old railway station, now an art exhibition, where they see vivid paintings by the local artist many of the townsfolk had recommended. It begins to rain, and three old women invite them to visit the artist at his house. Increasingly nervous, they try to leave after arriving, but the women refuse. They meet a fourth woman, the subject of one of the paintings, suckling Yolk, a boneless person who has not grown since birth, that the women reveal to be the artist. The couple leave, chased by Yolk, and hear a train whistle.

=== "Black Eyes" ===
The narrator, Flora and Chapa work for a non-governmental organization providing supplies to homeless people. One night, after handing out supplies, the narrator hears a knock at the back of their van. She sees two young boys wearing moccasins, white shirts and brown overalls, who she thinks are evil. They ask to enter the van and the narrator refuses, then sees they have completely black eyes. Chapa drives the van away and the children chase them on all fours.

Later, the narrator and Chapa visit Flora's house, where they see that the gate and door are open. Chapa enters, while the narrator notices from outside that one of the house's shutters is held slightly up by toes. She screams and the toes withdraw. A milk sachet rolls out of the house and explodes, releasing pink liquid. Chapa comes out and his steps sound sticky. They drive away, noticing then that the neigborhood is deserted and silent.

== Reception ==
A. K. Blakemore's Guardian review praises the combination of the European Gothic with a Latin American world, especially when Enríquez adds variation to the haunting trope of Gothic horror. For example, she regards the eponymous short story as "ask[ing] deeper questions about our relationships with the dead", a sentiment strengthened by the inclusion of the real-world case of Elisa Lam. Blakemore compliments Enríquez's use of comedy in "Metamorphosis" and "Julie", as well as her "subtly appalling" imagery and "genuinely horrifying" depiction of generational trauma in "Face of Disgrace". However, she felt some stories seemed rushed or underdeveloped, particularly compared to Things We Lost in the Fire, another of Enríquez's collections. Blakemore also criticized some of McDowell's translation as "overly literal".

Writing for the Chicago Review of Books, Leah Rachel von Essen praises Enríquez's evocation of "creeping dread" and her combination of "fantastical flair with real-life horrors", particularly around gendered issues such as domestic violence and sexual assault; she also appreciates McDowell's translation. She calls the depictions of body horror "vividly written" but notes that some of the bodily descriptions of marginalized people feel reductive.

The LA Times' Gina Isabel Rodriguez calls the collection "[e]ntertaining, political and exquisitely gruesome ... summon[ing] terror against the backdrop of everyday horrors". She praises Enríquez's ability to give the stories a "sense of place" despite not having the depth of her novel Our Share of Night. She labels McDowell's translation of Enríquez's writing "engrossing" with "tactile descriptions" and "sickening, perfect" imagery.

The collection won the 2024 Locus World Fantasy Award for a collection and was nominated for the 2025 Ignyte Award for Outstanding Anthology/Collected Works. It was named by TIME Magazine as one of the hundred must-read books of 2024.
