= Bruzzone =

Bruzzone is an Italian surname. Notable people with the surname include:

- Félix Bruzzone (born 1976), Argentinian writer
- Francesco Bruzzone (born 1962), Italian politician
- Mario Bruzzone (1887–1940), Italian sailor
- Nicolás Bruzzone (born 1985), Argentine rugby sevens player
- Rodolfo Bruzzone (1901–?), Argentine soccer player
- Tiziano Bruzzone (born 1984), Italian footballer
