= Catrileo =

Catrileo is a surname found primarily among the Mapuche in Chile. Notable people with the surname include:

- Daniela Catrileo (born 1987), Chilean Mapuche writer, poet and philosophy professor
- Hugo Catrileo (born 1997), Chilean Mapuche long-distance runner
- María Catrileo (born 1944), Chilean Mapuche linguist and academic
- Richard Catrileo (born 1992), Chilean Mapuche former footballer
- Rosa Catrileo (born 1981), Chilean Mapuche lawyer and politician
