= Mouthful of Birds =

Short-story collection by Samanta Schweblin

- First edition (Spanish)
- Author: Samanta Schweblin
- Original title: Pájaros en la boca
- Translator: Megan McDowell
- Language: Spanish
- Genre: Short Stories
- Publisher: Emecé Editores (Argentina)
- Publication date: 2009
- Publication place: Argentina
- English publication date: 2019
- Media type: Hardcover
- Pages: 240
- ISBN: 978-0399184628

Mouthful of Birds (Spanish: Pájaros en la boca) is a short story collection by Samanta Schweblin. Originally published in Spanish, it was translated into English by Megan McDowell in 2019. The stories feature uncanny plot twists and unexpected endings.

"Olingiris" first appeared in English in a 2010 issue of Granta. In 2017 "The Size of Things" was published in The New Yorker. In 2019 "Toward Happy Civilization" was published in The Atlantic and was read aloud by LeVar Burton for the Stitcher Radio podcast LeVar Burton Reads.

== Contents ==
Story
"Headlights"
"Preserves"
"Butterflies"
"Mouthful of Birds"
"Santa Claus Sleeps At Our House"
"The Digger"
"Irman"
"The Test"
"Toward Happy Civilization"
"Olingiris"
"My Brother Walter"
"The Merman"
"Rage of Pestilence"
"Heads Against Concrete"
"The Size of Things"
"Underground"
"Slowing Down"
"On the Steppe"
"A Great Effort"
"The Heavy Suitcase of Benavides"

== Literary significance and reception ==
Like Schweblin's novel Fever Dream, Mouthful of Birds received enthusiastic reviews.

The Guardian wrote, "Delving into the cryptic depths of the human psyche, this is a highly imaginative and thought-provoking collection." A review in the Los Angeles Review of Books concluded, "One of the greatest effects of Schweblin's writing is the sensation of having a trapdoor kicked open in your own mind — of not knowing this weird space even existed, but of course. There you are."

Book critic Michael Schaub said of the collection: "Mouthful of Birds is a stunning achievement from a writer whose potential is beginning to seem limitless."

Parul Sehgal, writing in The New York Times, noticed a variety of influences in Schweblin's stories, including Jesse Ball, Kelly Link, but, most of all, David Lynch.
