= Our Share of Night =

2019 novel by Mariana Enriquez

- Author: Mariana Enríquez
- Original title: Nuestra parte de noche
- Translator: Megan McDowell
- Language: Spanish
- Genre: horror, Latin American Gothic
- Publisher: Anagrama (Spanish), Penguin Random House (English)
- Publication date: 2019
- English publication date: 2023
- Awards: Premio Herralde

Our Share of Night (Spanish: Nuestra parte de noche) is a 2019 horror novel by Argentine author Mariana Enriquez. Set between 1960 and 1997, the story follows the Peterson family as they fight against an occult society in Argentina. The novel received positive reviews, and won the Premio Herralde in 2019. An English translation by Megan McDowell was published in 2023.

== Plot ==
=== 1981: Juan ===
Juan Peterson and his son Gaspar take a road trip from Buenos Aires to Iguazú.

3 months earlier, Juan's wife and Gaspar's mother, Rosario, was killed in a bus crash. The couple were part of the Order, a secret society that worships an ancient god they call the Darkness. The Order hopes that the Darkness will teach them a means to attain immortality by permanently keeping their consciousness alive. Juan, the son of poor Swedish immigrants, has suffered since birth from an incurable heart condition. He was discovered by Rosario's uncle, a doctor and member of the Order, who operated on his heart and took him away from his parents. Juan is one in a line of powerful "mediums" who the Order uses to commune with the Darkness. All mediums die early, and Juan is afraid that Gaspar has inherited his abilities and will be exploited by the Order.

During the road trip, Juan and Gaspar meet with an ally in the Order, Rosario's half-sister Tali; Juan also tries to contact Rosario's spirit in vain. At one point, he summons a demon to try to find her. The demon tells him Rosario has been taken by the Darkness, which he refuses to believe.

Once they arrive in Iguazú, Juan participates in a sacrificial ritual known as the Ceremonial, in which he channels the Darkness from his body. The strain of performing the ritual almost kills him. He confronts the three leaders of the Order—Anne Clarke, Florence Mathers, and Rosario's mother Mercedes—about Rosario's demise. They admit that they organized her death, as they feared that she was plotting against them, and then sent her spirit away into the Darkness. The only way Juan can find her spirit will be through the ritual, thus obliging him to continue being their medium. Later that night, he confronts Mercedes alone, and rips out her teeth and lips. He then makes Tali and Florence's son Stephen, his friend and occasional lover, promise to keep Gaspar safe from the Order should he die.

=== 1985-1987: Gaspar ===
Gaspar's friend Vicky loses her dog. The four friends—Gaspar, Vicky, Pablo and Adela—search for the dog to no avail. That night, Gaspar dreams of the dog scratching the window and whining. When he goes to look for the dog, his father catches him and informs him the dog is dead. Gaspar later finds the dog's corpse in a park.

Juan, since Rosario's death, has been physically and emotionally abusive to Gaspar. One night, while drunk, he shows Gaspar a box of human eyelids, shocking and disgusting him. The incident makes Gaspar remember another incident where Juan had gone to an abandoned house in the neighborhood; Gaspar had tried to follow him but was caught, beaten and locked for a full day in a room without food or drink.

Juan and Gaspar take a trip to Chascomús to visit Rosario's family. Gaspar wakes up bruised, naked and with an injured ankle in an unknown room. His father and a doctor enter, and the doctor claims that on the way to Chascomús, they were in a car accident. Gaspar does not believe her, as he remembers his father injuring him and a strange ritual, but Juan denies it.

Juan routinely disappears into the abandoned house or to perform the Ceremonials. Eventually, implied to have successfully found Rosario, he takes Gaspar to scatter her ashes. One night afterward, Juan has a fight with Gaspar; he cuts a symbol in his arm with a piece of glass and drinks from the wound. He then cuts himself open and forces Gaspar to drink his blood. Juan soon suffers an ischemic stroke and dies. His brother Luis arrives from Brazil to adopt Gaspar.

Meanwhile, Gaspar's friend Adela, who has a missing arm (a reference to the story Adela's House from Enríquez' Things We Lost In the Fire), grows obsessed with the abandoned house that Juan visited. She believes it may contain clues related to her missing father, who was possibly kidnapped by the junta. She convinces the other three to enter the house with her, but Gaspar inadvertently opens a door to the "Other Place," a part of the Darkness. Inside, Adela enters a room that the others are unable to enter; Gaspar manages to escape the house with Vicky and Pablo, but Adela is never found.

=== 1960-1976: Rosario ===
Rosario's family, the Bradfords, are founding members of the Order who arrive in Argentina in the 1800s and become wealthy by exploiting the indigenous Guaraní. Mercedes kidnaps local children and tortures them to summon the Darkness. Rosario herself meets Juan when she is eight and he is five, and they quickly become confidantes. As an adult, Rosario travels to London and becomes the first Argentine to graduate as a doctor of anthropology from Cambridge. After some years, Juan arrives in London as well with Stephen, and the three open a door to the Other Place that leads to a forest of human corpses and bones.

The backstory of the Order is revealed: it was established by a wealthy Englishman, Stephen's ancestor, who abducted a young Nri priestess and made her serve as a medium for the Order until she died. The Order since then has been keeping children to use as mediums and established branches all over the world, including in Argentina. One fourteen-year-old medium, raped by Stephen's grandfather and the Order's leadership, murdered them and committed suicide while Stephen's mother Florence was in London. Since then, Florence has rebuilt the society with new members. Florence's other son Eddie, driven mad by her failed attempts to create a medium, envies Juan's powers; he escapes from the Bradfords' estate. Rosario, Stephen and Juan plan to leave England, but Eddie finds them first and attempts to kill them, slaying several young members of the Order. Juan overpowers Eddie in the Other Place, kills him, and hangs him from a tree as an offering to the Darkness. In exchange, he cuts a Hand of Glory from Eddie's corpse and gifts it to Rosario.

After the marriage of Rosario and Juan and the birth of Gaspar, Florence and Mercedes tell Rosario that the Darkness has informed them how immortality can be attained: by transferring one's consciousness to the body of their child. The Darkness dictates that the first to do so must be Juan, so he can continue to act as the medium when his heart fails. Because the process is too strenuous for a young child, they want Juan to transfer his consciousness to Gaspar after his twelfth birthday. Juan and Rosario fight, as this would mean the death of Gaspar's soul, and Juan leaves. When he returns, he tells Rosario that he will put a seal on Gaspar to keep the Order from finding him once he turns twelve. To obtain this seal, he must sacrifice something to the Darkness, and to put the seal into effect, he must injure Gaspar; he will also give the child to his brother Luis to raise.

Rosario's estranged cousin Betty returns with her daughter Adela. Rosario warns Betty not to participate in the ceremony, but Betty does so anyway, and the Darkness eats part of Adela's arm. Juan and Rosario decide after this to move to Buenos Aires and take Betty and Adela to live near them as well.

=== 1987-1997: Gaspar ===
After the trauma of Adela's disappearance and his father's death, Gaspar is adopted by his uncle Luis. He is diagnosed with PTSD and hallucinations caused by epilepsy, although he doubts that his visions are truly hallucinations. In addition, he suffers from bursts of uncontrollable anger. Luis has twins with his girlfriend, who at first is kind to Gaspar, but grows afraid of his outbursts.

As a young adult, Gaspar reconnects with Pablo and Vicky. Pablo becomes an artist and Vicky attends medical school. Both are touched by their encounter in the abandoned house—Pablo is immune to catching HIV/AIDS and perceives a phantom hand that grasps at him in the dark, while Vicky hears voices from the Darkness and has an uncanny intuition for diagnosing her patients. Gaspar detects more doors to the Other Place but avoids opening them, guided by the symbol Juan cut in his arm.

Gaspar's girlfriend Marita, who works as a journalist, is given an article to edit for publication. The article concerns an investigation into Adela's disappearance; the journalist describes Betty ranting, intoxicated, about how Juan had sacrificed her daughter to the Darkness in order to save his own son. The journalist also describes how she attempted to find Gaspar, but was supernaturally blocked each time, and so gave up on the investigation.

Gaspar moves to his own apartment and Luis disappears soon afterward. A few days later, Luis is brought to the hospital, dying. His chest had been sawed open and a girl's rotting arm inserted into it, causing sepsis and eventually his death. A message cut into his body tells Gaspar to return to the Order. To seek answers and protect his friends and Luis' children from further attacks, Gaspar travels to the house of his grandparents, where he is kept against his will.

Mercedes tells him that she ordered the torture and death of Luis, and that the "car accident" in Chascomús was an attempt to transfer Juan's consciousness to Gaspar. Although the transfer was successful, Juan had helped Gaspar to force his consciousness out of his body. She also confirms that Juan had in fact sacrificed Adela to the Darkness to save Gaspar from the Order. Now that he has come to the Order of his own free will, they will use him as their new medium to obtain immortality.

Gaspar is held prisoner on the estate grounds while the Order attempt to activate his powers. Aided by Stephen, he discovers a door to the Other Place. He leads the Order's members inside and to Eddie's corpse, where the Darkness awakens to consume them. He and Stephen escape and lock the door to the Other Place, destroying the Order, although Stephen warns it has many members across the world. Gaspar senses Adela on the other side of the door and resolves to keep searching for her in the Other Place.

== Themes ==
Academics consider the novel to be political literature, rather than a pure gothic horror novel. Helene Weldt-Basson, writing for the Latin American Literary Review, argued that the Order is an allegory for the Argentine dictatorship, while Juan Peterson symbolizes the Argentine press — more specifically, that he represents a dissident journalist who tries and fails to escape the dictatorship and is forced to cooperate with it. Gaspar represents the children of the Argentine dictatorship, who eventually defeat it.

== Reception ==
The novel received mostly positive reviews. Elena Santos, writing for the journal Guaraguao, called it one of the most ambitious works of Latin American Gothic literature and Hispanophone literature in recent years. Elizabeth Gonzalez James of the Los Angeles Review of Books called the novel a "masterwork", while Danielle Trussoni, writing for the New York Times, called it a "enchanting, shattering, once-in-a-lifetime reading experience."

Sam Byers writing for The Guardian, gave a negative review, criticizing the translation, structure, and lack of focus. Siobhan Murphy of The Times praised the premise, but criticized the characters, narrative, and "gratuitous" sexual elements of the story. Miranda France of the Times Literary Supplement praised Enríquez' treatment of political themes, but criticized the pace of the novel.

The novel was named one of the ten best novels of 2023 by The Atlantic and one of the 100 best books of 2023 by Time and the New York Times. Reactor named it one of the most iconic speculative fiction books of the 21st century.

=== Awards ===
- 2019: Premio Herralde de Novela
- 2022: Grand prix de l'Imaginaire du Roman étranger traduit
