= Anna Seghers Prize =

German literary award

Anna Seghers Preis is a literary prize of Germany. The prize goes back to the German writer Anna Seghers (1900–1983), who stated in her testament that the revenues from her work should be used to encourage promising young writers. The award is endowed with 25,000 euros, to be awarded in equal parts to an author from the German and the Latin American region. The prize has been awarded since 1986 by the Akademie der Künste der DDR, in 1994 by the Academy of Arts, Berlin, and since 1995 by the Anna Seghers Foundation. Each year, the board of the Anna Seghers Foundation names prominent representatives of cultural life as jurors to independently select the two winners.

== Winners ==
- 1986: Ingeborg Arlt, Omar Saavedra Santis
- 1987: Kerstin Hensel, Ramón Díaz Eterovic, Gioconda Belli
- 1988: Kathrin Schmidt, Jens Sparschuh
- 1989: Annett Gröschner, Jörg Kowalski
- 1990: Arturo Arias, Daína Chaviano, Johannes Jansen, Reinhard Jirgl, Sonja Voß-Scharfenberg.
- 1991: Haus für Strassenkinder (Brazil)
- 1992: Ines Eck
- 1993: Alois Hotschnig
- 1994: João Ubaldo Ribeiro
- 1995: Marion Titze
- 1996: Michael Kleeberg, Miguel Vitagliano
- 1997: Ulrich Peltzer, Carmen Boullosa
- 1998: Róža Domašcyna, David Mitrani Arenal
- 1999: Stefanie Menzinger, Hermann Bellinghausen
- 2000: Melanie Gieschen, Alonso Cueto
- 2001: Ana Teresa Torres, Carsten Probst
- 2002: Rafael Gumucio, Lutz Seiler
- 2003: Catalin Dorian Florescu
- 2004: Claudia Hernández, Jan Wagner
- 2005: Cristina Rivera-Garza, Ulf Stolterfoht
- 2006: Nico Bleutge, Pedro Lemebel
- 2007: Fabián Casas, Katja Oskamp
- 2008: Lukas Bärfuss, Alejandra Costamagna
- 2009: Daniela Dröscher, Guadalupe Nettel
- 2010: Félix Bruzzone, Andreas Schäfer
- 2011: Sabrina Janesch, Lina Meruane (Chile)
- 2012: Olga Grjasnowa, Wilmer Urrelo Zaráte
- 2015: Nino Haratischwili
- 2016: Yuri Herrera (Mexico)
- 2017: Maren Kames
- 2018: Julián Fuks, Manja Präkels
- 2019: Fernanda Melchor, Joshua Groß
- 2020: Ivna Žic, Hernán Ronsino
- 2021: Francis Nenik, Magela Baudoin
- 2022: Yael Inokai, Alia Trabucco Zeran
- 2023: Makenzy Orcel, Bonn Park
- 2024: Carlos Fonseca, Johannes Herwig
- 2025: Enrique Winter, Marlen Hobrack
- 2026: Daniela Catrileo, Sonja M. Schultz
