= The Dangers of Smoking in Bed =

2009 short story collection by Mariana Enriquez

- Author: Mariana Enriquez
- Original title: Los peligros de fumar en la cama
- Translator: Megan McDowell
- Language: Spanish
- Genre: Horror fiction Slipstream
- Publisher: Anagrama
- Publication date: 2009
- Publication place: Argentina
- English publication date: 2021

The Dangers of Smoking in Bed (originally Los peligros de fumar en la cama) is a psychological horror short story collection written by Mariana Enriquez. The collection was first published in Argentina in November 2009. The book was translated to English in 2021 by Megan McDowell.

This book has been critically acclaimed and was shortlisted for the 2021 International Booker Prize.

== Background ==
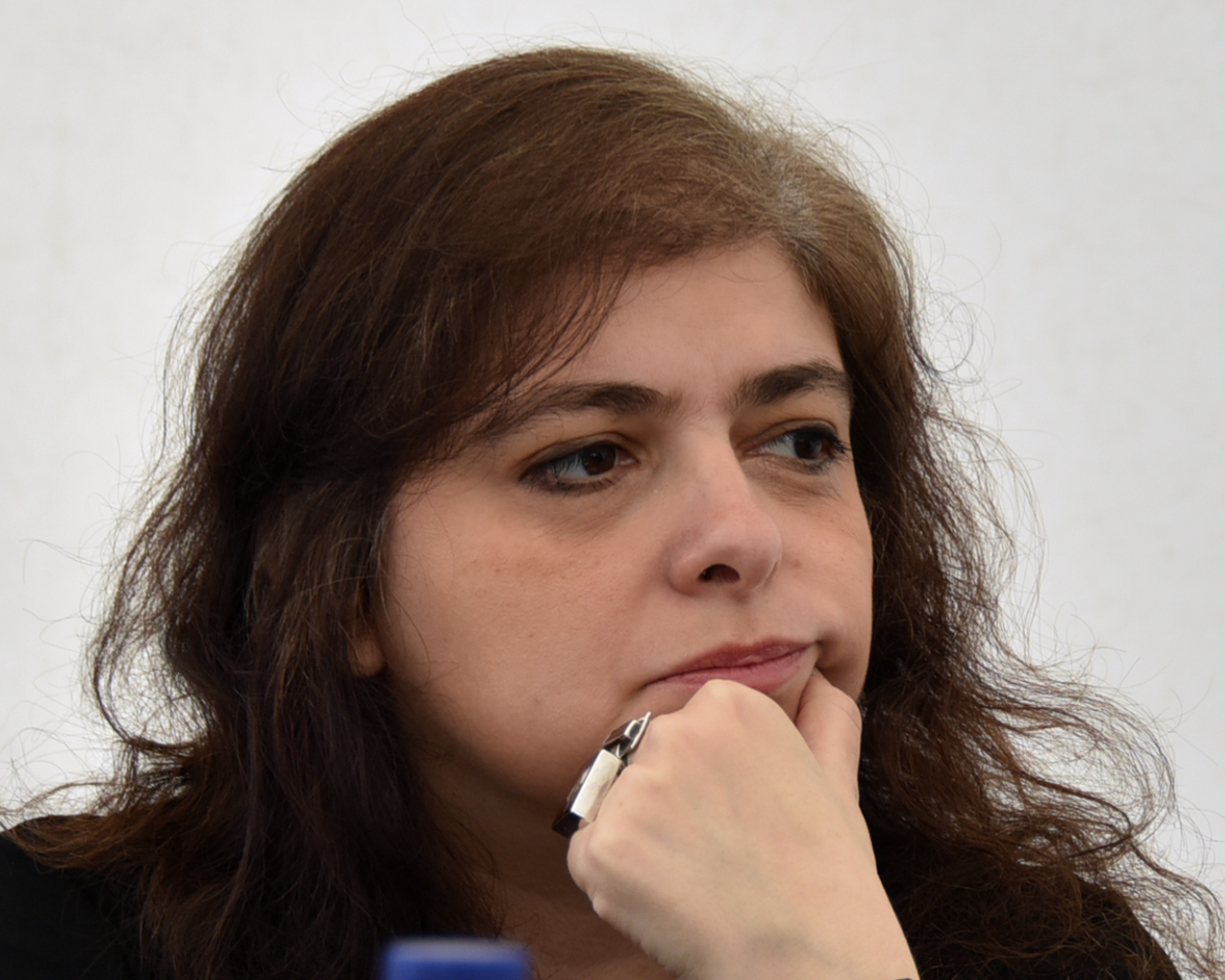
Mariana Enriquez

Mariana Enriquez, born in 1973, is an Argentine writer and journalist located in Buenos Aires. She is currently the deputy editor of the arts and culture section of Pagina 12. Her published works also include Bajar es lo peor (1995), Cómo desaparacer completamente (2004), Chicos que vuelven (2010), Las cosas que perdimos en el fuego (2016), and Nuestra parte de noche (2019). Her work has been translated into German and English and published around the globe.

Her literature is rooted in Latin America urban areas, a realistic setting she pulls from her own life. She twists Latin American mythologies, local urban legends and crimes, pagan saints, and local issues in order to integrate culture into her horror stories. Enriquez credits a technique of blurring the realistic and fantastic for the sinister nature of her writing.

== Synopsis of each story ==
=== Angelita Unearthed ===
A girl discovers small bones in her backyard, and her grandmother claims they are the bones of Angelita, the grandmother's sister who died as a baby. Years later, a decomposing baby appears at the girl's bedside, and the girl realizes that the baby is Angelita. Angelita follows the girl everywhere but never talks. One day, the girl takes Angelita to the house where her bones were displaced in order to make peace with her.

=== Our Lady of the Quarry ===
A group of friends hangs out at a quarry pool every weekend. One day, Diego suggests that they all go to the quarry's altar, but once the girls reach the altar, Diego and Silvia ditch them. Natalia prays at the altar, and savage dogs appear and surround Diego and Silvia. Natalia leads the other girls to the bus stop as Silvia's and Diego's screams are heard in the distance.

=== The Cart ===
One afternoon, a very drunk man stumbles into a neighborhood with a cart full of stuff. He terrorizes the neighborhood, and irate neighbors chase the man off. His rotting cart is left behind, and two weeks later, the neighborhood begins to deteriorate. Some blame the cart's presence for the neighborhood's extreme decline. One girl's family isn't struggling nearly as much as the other neighbors, and her family hides this fact until their only option is to escape.

=== The Well ===
Josefina visits The Woman, an alleged witch, while on a family trip. After the trip, Josefina has newfound fear and anxiety that is crippling; she can't live a normal life. One day, she decides to go back to The Woman's house in hopes that The Woman can help her. The Woman tells Josefina that her family had regrettably passed evil spirits onto her, and Josefina is so distraught that she attempts to throw herself down a well.

=== Rambla Triste ===
Sofía visits her friend Julieta in Barcelona, but the city isn't the same one Sofía remembers. Julieta tells Sofía that countless children's souls reside in Rambla del Raval, that they want people to suffer like they did, so the children drive people mad and prevent them from leaving. Sofía is spooked, and Julieta says that she plans on getting out as soon as possible.

=== The Lookout ===
The Lady Upstairs is a being that lives in the abandoned lookout tower of a hotel. The Lady Upstairs notices how isolated a woman named Elina is, and she takes the form of a girl to convince Elina to visit the lookout tower. The next day, Elina goes up to the tower, and The Lady Upstairs plots to lock Elina in the tower so that she will eventually die and take The Lady Upstairs’ place.

=== Where Are You, Dear Heart? ===
A girl becomes obsessed with people who have cardiac diseases and fetishizes their irregular heartbeats. One day, she meets up with a man who has a cardiac disease and lets her manipulate and listen to his heartbeat for her own pleasure. This puts the man's health at risk, but he is willing to die for the sake of the girl's obsession.

=== Meat ===
After the successful release of his album Meat, Santiago Espina commits suicide. Two girls who are extreme fans of Espina sneak into the cemetery where Espina is buried, and they consume his body. The girls are arrested, sent to a psychiatric hospital, and don't speak to anyone but each other the entire time, causing hysteria across the country.

=== No Birthdays or Baptisms ===
Nico gets many bizarre film requests. One day, a lady asks Nico to film her daughter Marcela's hallucinations in hopes that Marcela will see that her hallucinations aren't real. Marcela is unconvinced by Nico's videos, and Nico notices that her body is mutilated. Marcela tells Nico that “he” cuts her in her sleep, and she is disappointed that Nico can't see him.

=== Kids Who Come Back ===
Mechi maintains the archive of lost and disappeared children in Buenos Aires. One day, Mechi finds one of the missing children, who was supposedly seen dead in a video, sitting in a park. This is the beginning of hundreds of missing children reappearing out of nowhere, not a day older than when they disappeared. However, the children's parents don't recognize them, and they begin to disown the children. All of the children gather into abandoned houses, and Mechi visits them hoping to get some answers.

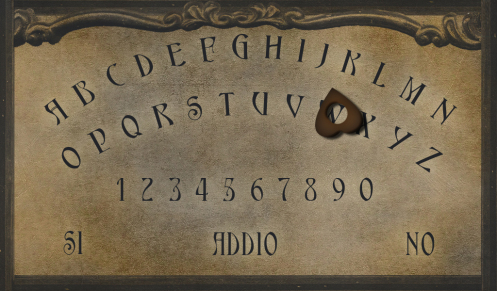
Ouija Board

=== The Dangers of Smoking in Bed ===
Paula wakes up to the smell of smoke outside and discovers that an apartment had caught on fire, killing a woman who had fallen asleep smoking a cigarette. Paula goes back to bed, but she can't sleep. She makes a tent with her covers, puts a lamp under the tent, and criticizes her aging body and the defects that now litter her skin. "Her body is failing her in more ways that she didn't want to think about." She burns holes in the sheets with a cigarette. When she looks at her ceiling from outside the tent, it looks like it's covered with stars, and she admires them.

=== Back When We Talked to the Dead ===
A group of girls' attempts to use a Ouija board are always unsuccessful, and a spirit tells them that one of the girls doesn't belong. The girls each think of someone they know who has disappeared, but Pinocchia can't think of someone. One night, Pinocchia's brother vanishes in front of her. The spirit tells the girls that Pinocchia was the one who didn't belong.

== Publication and translation ==
Enriquez initially had her series of short stories published in Spanish for Argentinian audiences in 2009. Following the success of her 2017 translation of Enriquez's earlier work, Things We Lost in the Fire, Megan McDowell translated The Dangers of Smoking in Bed into English for mainstream publication in January 2021. This translation was published in the United States by Hogarth Books.

== Reception ==
The 2021 translation by Megan McDowell of Enriquez's book was received quite positively by American audiences, with many reviewers showing immense appreciation for the haunting scenes and intense imagery which Enriquez was able to create.

The novel was nominated and shortlisted for the 2021 International Booker Prize, 2021 Kirkus Prize, and 2022 Ray Bradbury Prize.

Kirkus Reviews named The Dangers of Smoking in Bed one of the best books of 2021.
