= Fever Dream (film) =

2021 film directed by Claudia Llosa

- Official release poster
- Spanish: Distancia de rescate
- Directed by: Claudia Llosa
- Screenplay by: Claudia Llosa; Samanta Schweblin
- Based on: Fever Dream by Samanta Schweblin
- Produced by: Mark Johnson; Tom Williams; Claudia Llosa
- Starring: María Valverde; Dolores Fonzi
- Cinematography: Oscar Faura
- Edited by: Guillermo de la Cal
- Music by: Natalie Holt
- Production companies: Gran Via Productions; Paradise Falls; Fábula; Wanda Films
- Distributed by: Netflix
- Release dates: September 20, 2021 (Zinemaldia); October 6, 2021 (United States)
- Running time: 93 minutes
- Countries: Chile; Peru; Spain; United States
- Language: Spanish

Fever Dream (Spanish: Distancia de rescate, lit. 'Rescue Distance') is a 2021 psychological thriller film directed by Claudia Llosa from a screenplay that she co-wrote with Samanta Schweblin, based on Schweblin's 2014 novel of the same name. The film stars María Valverde, Dolores Fonzi, German Palacios, Guillermo Pfening and Emilio Vodanovich.

The film had its world premiere at the 69th San Sebastián International Film Festival on September 20, 2021. It was released in select theaters in the United States on October 6, 2021, and on Netflix on October 13, 2021.

== Plot ==
A woman named Amanda arrives in a quiet rural town in Argentina with her daughter Nina to spend a few days on vacation. Next to their rented house lives Carola and her son David. The two women develop a close friendship, but Amanda soon realizes that things are not as they appear to be.

== Cast ==
- María Valverde as Amanda
- Dolores Fonzi as Carola
- German Palacios as Omar
- Guillermo Pfening as Marco
- Emilio Vodanovich as David
- Guillermina Sorribes Liotta as Nina
- Marcelo Michinaux as David
- Cristina Banegas

== Production ==
In December 2018, Netflix announced that it would produce a film version of the novel Fever Dream by Samanta Schweblin and directed by the Peruvian director Claudia Llosa. Filming, by the production companies Gran Via Productions and Fábula, began in Chile in early 2019.

== Reception ==
On Rotten Tomatoes, the film holds an approval rating of 72% based on 39 reviews, with an average rating of 6.5/10. The site's critics consensus reads: "The meaning of this alluring drama can feel as elusive as a Fever Dream, but it's steadily absorbing and consistently difficult to look away." On Metacritic, the film has a weighted average score of 75 out of 100, based on 9 critics, indicating "generally favorable" reviews.
