= Alejandra Costamagna =

Chilean writer and journalist

- Book fair Frankfurt (Germany) 2026.
- Born: Alejandra Costamagna Crivelli; 23 March 1970 (age 56); Santiago, Chile
- Education: Diego Portales University
- Occupations: Writer, journalist
- Notable work: En voz baja, Animales domésticos, El sistema del tacto
- Awards: Altazor (2006); Anna Seghers-Preis (2008)

Alejandra Costamagna Crivelli (born 23 March 1970) is a Chilean writer and journalist.

== Early life ==
Costamagna's parents arrived in Chile from Argentina in 1967. She recalls that her first approach to writing was through journal entries that she began to make irregularly from age 10.

It was in her adolescence when she began to take writing more seriously, after entering Francisco Miranda school when she moved to La Reina. There, Professor Guillermo Peréz "recommended her to read Neruda, Mistral, Shakespeare, Chekhov, and Crime and Punishment by Dostoyevsky, a book which still marks her writing today." In addition, an interview was arranged and she went to the house of her neighbor Nicanor Parra, with whom she spoke about poetry and insomnia, which both shared.

Alejandra studied journalism at Universidad Diego Portales and frequented the workshops of Guillermo Blanco, Pía Barros, Carlos Cerda, and Antonio Skármeta. Later, she studied for a master's degree in Literature at the University of Chile.

== Career ==
She has collaborated in the magazines Gatopardo, Rolling Stone, and El Malpensante. In 1994, she obtained a FONDART grant to write her first novel.

She was editor of the Culture and Entertainment section of the newspaper La Nación. She worked on Rock & Pop radio station, on Gente de mente and Parque Forestal programs, in which she was the radio speaker.

She published her first novel, En voz baja, in 1996, and followed it two years later with Ciudadano en retiro. Both works received positive reviews from the writer Roberto Bolaño:

There is a generation of (Chilean) women writers who promise to devour everything. At the head, clearly, two stand out. These are Lina Meruane and Alejandra Costamagna, followed by Nona Fernández and by five or six young women armed with all the implements of good literature.

— Roberto Bolaño, February 1999

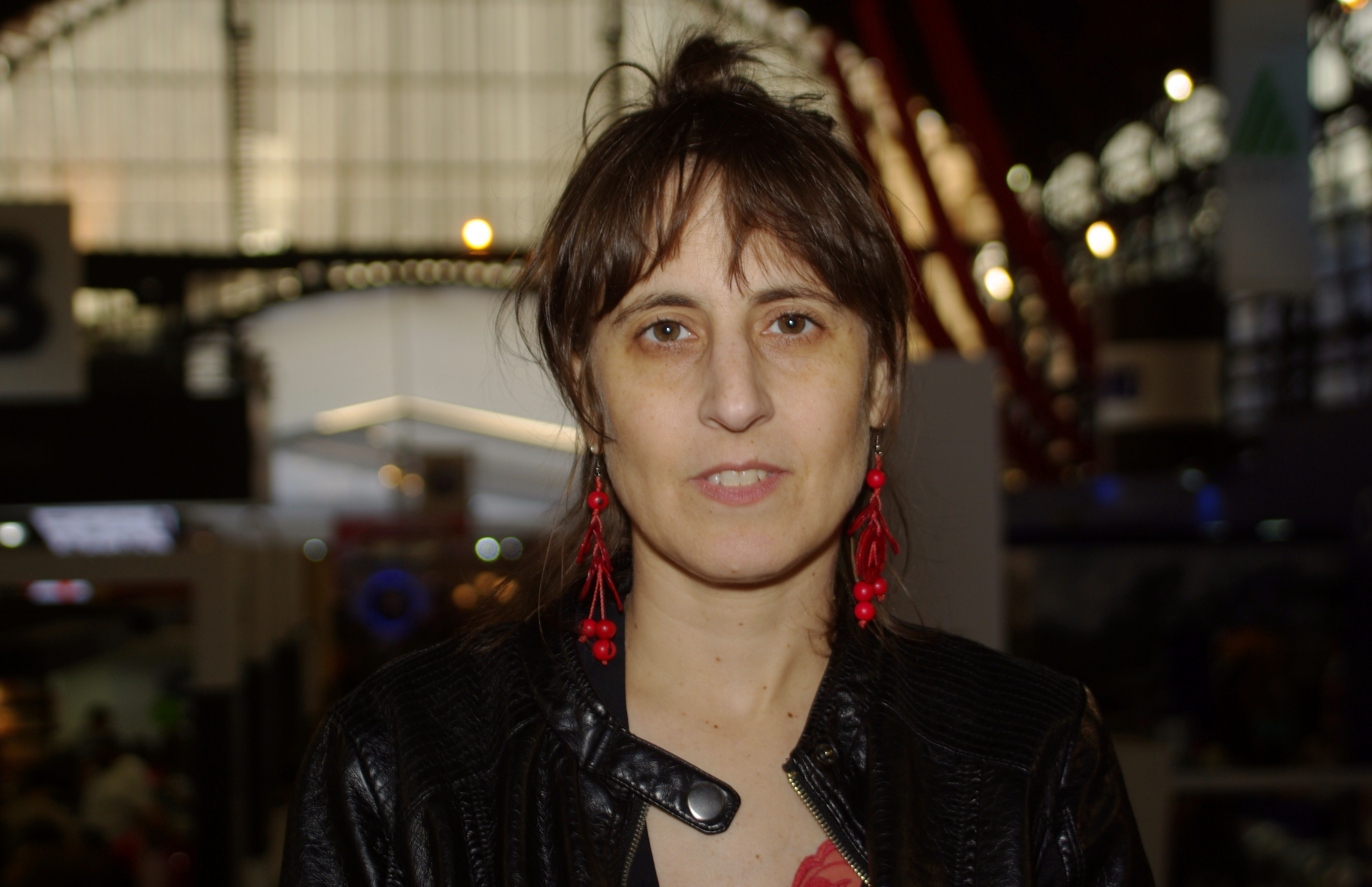
Costamagna at FILSA 2015

In 2000 her first book of short stories appeared, Malas noches. Although she has continued to write novels, Costamagna has specially developed the relato, so much so that she even reconverted her first novel into one, "Había una vez un pájaro", which appeared in a 2013 book of the same title, accompanied by two other texts. In El Mercurio, Rodrigo Pinto compared this "calling to purify and clean her texts" with that of José Santos González Vera, who used to republish his works with the warning "corrected and diminished edition", but stressed that in Costamagna it acquired a different and even more radical expression.

She also received a scholarship from the International Writing Program of the University of Iowa, 2003.

Her works have been translated into several languages (Italian, French, Danish, Korean) and have been honored with several awards, including the Altazor (2006) and the Anna Seghers-Preis (2008) for the best Latin American author of the year.

Costamagna has taught literary workshops. Also, she has been a theater commentator for national newspapers and magazines, and has worked as a columnist and chronicler for various magazines.

Her latest novel El sistema del tacto was published in 2018.

== Personal life ==
Costamagna maintained in 2011 that she likes silence ("I like this silence half contaminated by the noise of cars, from the city that gets into the distance. It's like being alone, but accompanied. And if I need to talk, I have Pascual."), that she does not want to have children ("The idea of the family composed of mother, father, children, nannies and pets seems to me to be super-enclosed, poor and conservative. Aside from my personal choice not to be a mother, I think having children is super nice."), that she was not worried about having a massive success ("I like that my life is still normal, that writing and publishing is my happiness. I do not want my work to become a race for success, to have to respond to an editorial expectation. I do not see myself like this."), and lamented stereotypes about women ("That women are crying the most and writing with more sentimentality is a stereotype that is very bad for gender equality. And that happens with questions of the duty of women to marry, to have children and to form a happy family.").

== Awards and distinctions ==
- Juegos literarios Gabriela Mistral awards for En voz baja (1996)
- Premio Municipal de Literatura for En voz baja (1997)
- Fondart Grant to write her first novel (1994)
- Finalist for the 2001 Altazor Award with Malas noches
- Finalist for the 2002 Planeta Argentina Award with Cansado ya del sol
- Finalist for the 2003 Altazor Award with Cansado ya del sol
- International Writing Program Scholarship from the University of Iowa (2003)
- Altazor Award for Últimos fuegos (2006)
- Art Critics' Circle Award for Dile que no estoy (2007)
- Finalist for the 2008 Altazor Award with Dile que no estoy
- Anna Seghers-Preis - German literary award (2008)
- 2009 Best Literary Works Award in the Unpublished Work category from the National Book and Reading Council for Animales domésticos
- Finalist for the 2012 Altazor Award with Animales domésticos

== Works ==
=== Books ===
- En voz baja, novel, LOM Ediciones, 1996
- Ciudadano en retiro, novel, Planeta, 1998
- Malas noches, short stories, Planeta, 2000. Divided into three sections, containing 15 stories plus an explanatory note about the gestation of the texts:
  - "Veintiséis dientes": "Boca abierta", "Micro", "Buenaventura", "Sin voz", and "Veintiséis dientes"
  - "Noticias de Japón": "Grasa en la estación", "Violeta azulado", "Donde se congelaba la primavera", "Parcialmente nublado", "Noticias de Japón", and "Grito de Leningrado"
  - "En el parque": "Sólo un poco, en la mejilla", "Ellos", "Espejo", and "En el parque"
- Cansado ya del sol, novel, Planeta, 2002
- Últimos fuegos, short stories, Ediciones B. 2005. Containing 16 texts:
  - "Santa Fe", "Coronas vigilantes", "La invención del silencio", "Cuadrar las cosas", "Violeta azulado", "Bombero en las colinas", "El tono de un noble", "Domingos felices", "La epidemia de Traiguén", "La faena", "Noticias de Japón", "Champaña", "El olor de los claveles", "Chufa", "Cigarrillos, el diario, el pan", and "El último incendio"
- Dile que no estoy, novel, Planeta, 2007
- Naturalezas muertas, long story (as defined by the author); Cuneta, 2010
- Animales domésticos, short stories, Mondadori, 2011. Containing 11 stories:
  - "Yo, Claudio", "Imposible salir de la Tierra", "A las cuatro, a las cinco, a las seis", "Daisy está contigo", "Hambre", "Patanjali", "Hombrecitos", "Pelos", "La epidemia de Traiguén", "El único orden posible, and "Nadie nunca se acostumbra"
- Cruce de peatones, chronicles, interviews, and profiles, selection by Julieta Marchant; Ediciones UDP, 2012
- Había una vez un pájaro, three short stories, Cuneta, 2013. Contains "Nadie nunca se acostumbra", the micro-tale "Agujas de reloj", the titular story, and a final explanatory note by the author, entitled "En voz baja"
- Imposible salir de la Tierra, ten short stories that date back to the years 2005–2015; six published in books and magazines, four unpublished. Almadía (Mexico)/Estruendomudo CL, 2016

=== Stories in collective publications ===
- Música ligera (1994, Grijalbo, Chile).
- Salidas de madre (1997, Planeta, Chile).
- Voces de Eros (1997, Mondadori, Chile).
- Cuentos extraviados (1997, Alfaguara, Chile).
- Líneas aéreas (1999, Lengua de Trapo, España).
- Volver a verla y otros cuentos (2000, Alfaguara, Chile).
- Con pasión (2000, Planeta, Chile).
- Se habla español (2000, Alfaguara, Chile/Estados Unidos).
- Ecos urbanos (2001, Alfaguara, Chile).
- Historias de mente (2001, Alfaguara, Chile).
- Cuentos chilenos contemporáneos (2001, Lom, Chile).
- Uno en quinientos (2004, Alfaguara, Chile).
- Young Writing from Young Writers of the World (2006, Kang Publishing, Corea).
- Alucinaciones TXT (2007, Puerto de Escape, Chile).
- Narrativa chilena actual: 28 narradores meridionales (2007, La siega, Argentina).
- Dios es Chileno (2007, Planeta, Chile).
- Maldito amor (2008, Alfaguara, Chile).
- Porotos granados (2008, Catalonia, Chile).
- Sube a la alcoba por la ventana (2008, Munhakdongne Publishing, Corea).
- Las mujeres cuentan (2010, Simplemente editores, Chile).
- Junta de vecinas (2011, Calembé, España).
- Los malditos (2011, Ediciones UDP, Chile).
- Cl. Textos de fronteras (2012, Ediciones Universidad Alberto Hurtado, Chile).
- Volver a los 17 (2013, Editorial Planeta, Chile).
- Selección chilena (2016, Estruendomudo, Chile y Perú).
- Poliamor (2018, Anfibia, Argentina).
- El río y la ciudad (2019, Eduner, Argentina).
