= Olga Grjasnowa =

German writer (born 1984)

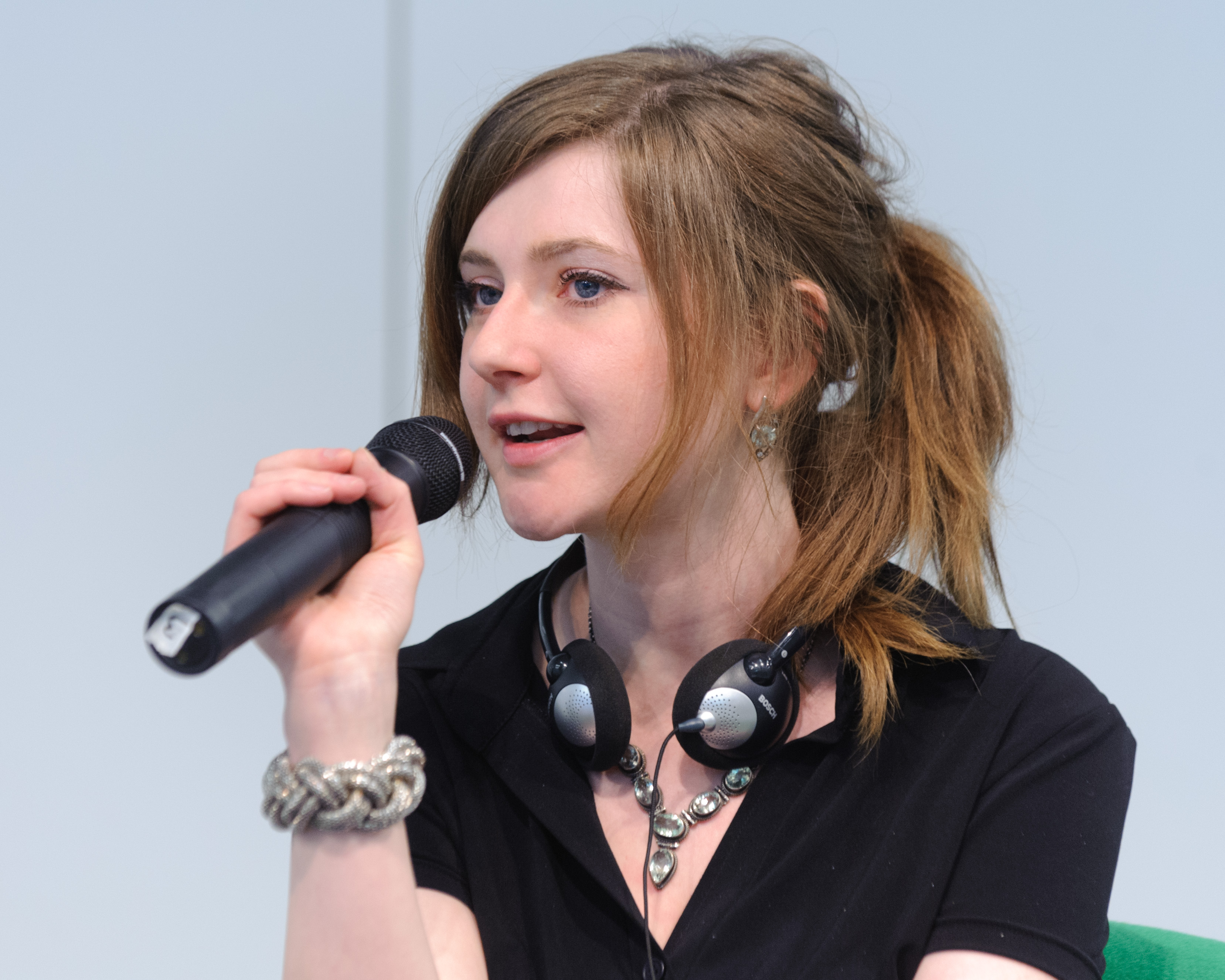
Grjasnowa in 2012

Olga Grjasnowa (born November 14, 1984) is a German writer currently living in Berlin, Germany.

== Personal life and education ==
Olga Grjasnowa was born into a Russian-Jewish family in Baku, Azerbaijan. Her father, Oleg Grjasnow, practiced law and her mother, Julija Winnikowa, was a musicologist. The family came to Hesse in 1996 as so-called 'quota refugees' (Kontingentflüchtlinge). Grjasnowa started learning German when she was 11 years old. She completed her secondary education in Frankfurt. Beginning in 2005, Grjasnowa first pursued a degree in art history and Slavic studies at the University of Göttingen. She then changed courses to enroll in the "Creative Writing" program offered by the German Institute for Literature in Leipzig, obtaining her bachelor's degree in 2010. After studying abroad in Poland, Russia (at the Maxim Gorky Literature Institute), and Israel, Grjasnowa took up dance studies at the Free University of Berlin.

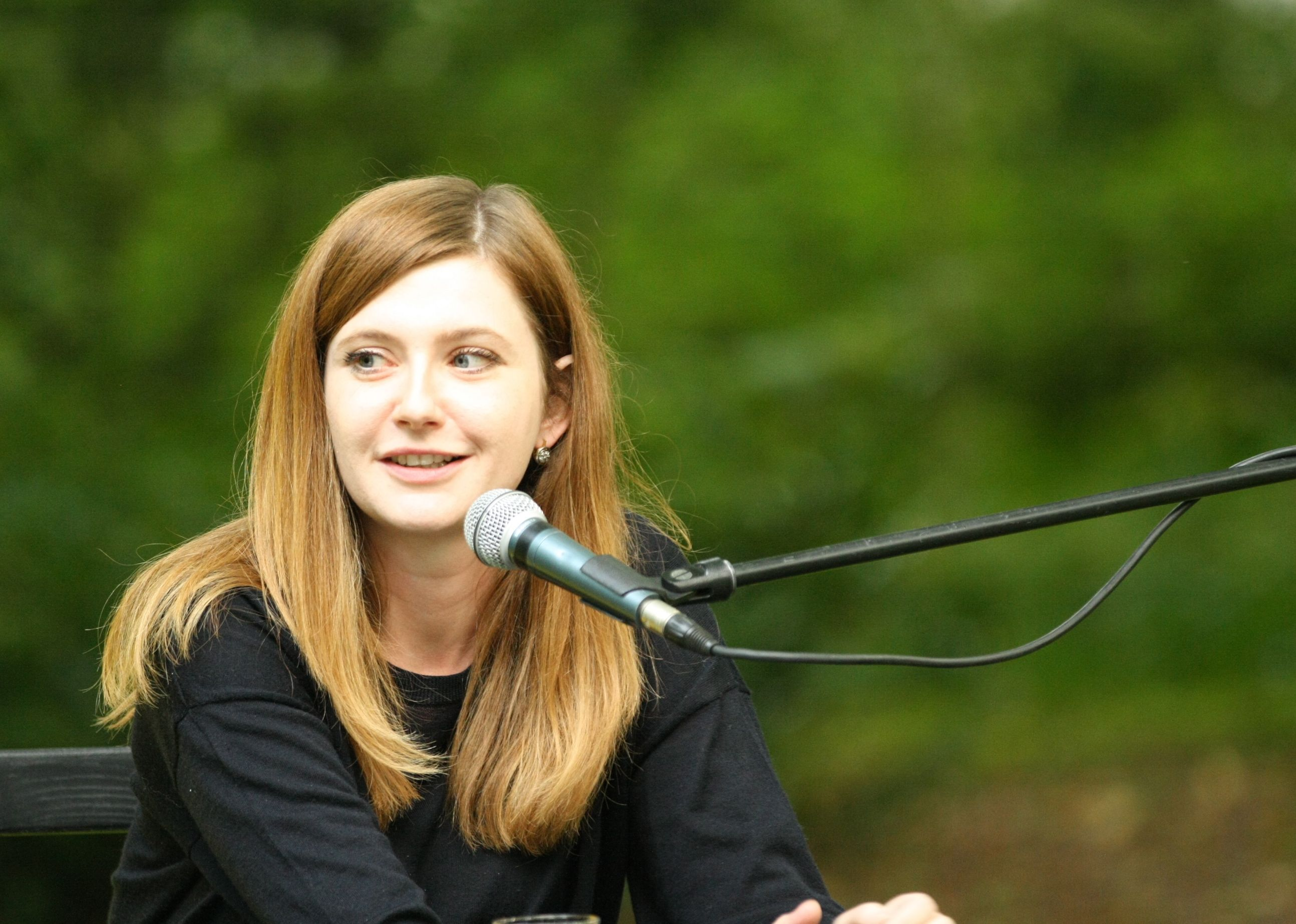
Grjasnowa in 2014

She was a member of the PEN Centre Germany.

Olga Grjasnowa is married to Syrian actor Ayham Majid Agha, with whom she has one daughter.

== Writing career ==
In 2007, Grjasnowa took part in the "Klagenfurter Literaturkurs". She received a scholarship from the Rosa Luxemburg Foundation in 2008. Grjasnowa took part in the "Jürgen-Ponto-Writer's-Workshop" in 2010. She received the WIENER WORTSTAETTEN's dramatist prize for her first play Mitfühlende Deutsche (Sympathetic Germans) in the same year. Grjasnowa was also awarded a Crossing Borders scholarship by the Robert Bosch Stiftung in 2011 and the Hermann Lenz Scholarship in 2012.

Her debut novel All Russians Love Birch Trees (published in the original as Der Russe ist einer, der Birken liebt) caused an immediate stir upon its publication in 2012 and was praised in the arts sections of many German newspapers.

== Works ==
- Grjasnowa, Olga (2014). Die juristische Unschärfe einer Ehe Roman (in German). München. ISBN 978-3-446-24598-3. OCLC 880703782.
- —— (2017). Gott ist nicht schüchtern Roman (in German). Berlin: Aufbau-Verlag. ISBN 978-3-351-03665-2. OCLC 964393125.

=== English translation ===
- Grjasnowa, Olga; Bacon, Eva (2014). All Russians love birch trees. New York. ISBN 978-1-59051-584-6. OCLC 829099003.
- ——; Derbyshire, Katy (2019). City of Jasmine. London. ISBN 978-1-78607-487-4. OCLC 1089826635.

=== Audio books ===
- Der Russe ist einer, der Birken liebt. 2012.
- Die juristische Unschärfe einer Ehe. 2014.
- City of Jasmine. 2019.

== Awards and recognition ==
- 2012: Anna Seghers-Preis
- 2012: Klaus-Michael Kühne Prize
- 2012: Hermann-Lenz Scholarship
- 2014: Work stipend supporting professional authors by the Department of Culture of the Senate of Berlin
- 2015: Adelbert von Chamisso Prize
