= Mariana Enríquez =

Argentine journalist, novelist, and short story writer

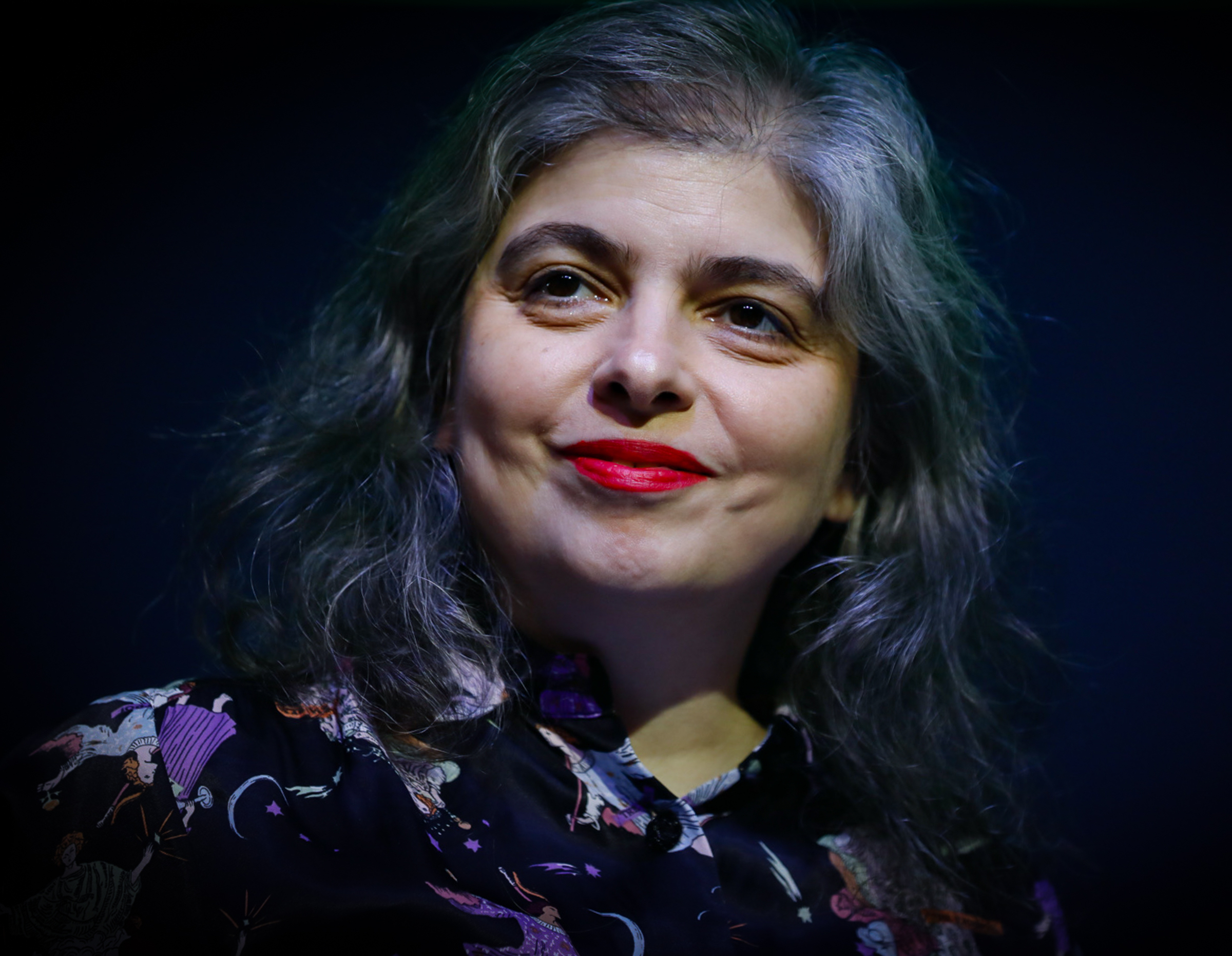
- Enríquez in 2022
- Born: 1973 (age 52–53); Buenos Aires, Argentina
- Education: National University of La Plata
- Occupations: Journalist; novelist; short story writer
- Known for: The Dangers of Smoking in Bed; Chicos que vuelven

Mariana Enríquez (born 1973) is an Argentine journalist, novelist, and short story writer. She is a part of the group of writers known as the "new Argentine narrative". Her short stories fall within the horror and Latin American Gothic genres and have been published in international magazines such as Granta, Electric Literature, Asymptote, McSweeney's, Virginia Quarterly Review, and The New Yorker.

Her fictional works include the short story collection Things We Lost in the Fire (2016), which received the 2017 Premio Ciutat de Barcelona in the category of Literature in Spanish; and the novel Our Share of Night (2019), for which she won the 2019 Premio Herralde de Novela, the 2019 Premio Celsius, the 2022 Grand prix de l'Imaginaire, and others.

In journalism, Enríquez serves as deputy editor of the cultural supplement "Radar" of the Argentine newspaper Página/12. She holds a degree in Journalism and Social Communication from the National University of La Plata. Her work encompasses chronicles, interviews, and essays on popular culture, rock music, literature, and social phenomena, with a style that reflects her interests in the dark, the marginal, and the countercultural. She has collaborated with various publications such as Rolling Stone Argentina, Anfibia, TXT, La Mano, and El Guardián, as well as argentine Radio Nacional. She has compiled part of her journalistic and essayistic work in the volume El otro lado. Retratos, fetichismos, confesiones (Ediciones UDP, 2020).

In 2025, she released Somebody is Walking on Your Grave, a nonfiction collection of short essays and anecdotes about her visits to graveyards around the world.

== Early life ==
Enríquez was born in 1973 in Buenos Aires, and grew up in Valentín Alsina, a suburb in the Greater Buenos Aires metropolitan area. Parts of her family hail from North-Eastern Argentina (Corrientes and Misiones), Paraguay, and Galicia. Enríquez would later move alongside her family to La Plata, where she became part of the local literary and punk scenes. This would inspire her to study journalism with a focus on rock music.

== Career ==
Mariana Enríquez holds a degree in Journalism and Social Communication from the National University of La Plata. She is a journalist and the deputy editor of the Arts and Culture section of Página 12, and she teaches at literature workshops.

Enríquez has published four novels, including: Bajar es lo peor (Espasa-Calpe, 1995), Cómo desaparecer completamente (Emecé, 2004) and Nuestra parte de noche (Anagrama, 2019) and Éste es el mar (Literatura Random House, 2017). She is also the author of two short story collections, Los peligros de fumar en la cama (Emecé, 2009) and Las cosas que perdimos en el fuego (Editorial Anagrama, 2016), and the novelette Chicos que vuelven (Eduvim, 2010). Her stories have appeared in anthologies of Spain, Mexico, Chile, Bolivia and Germany.

In 2017, Las cosas que perdimos en el fuego was translated into English by Megan McDowell, and published as Things We Lost in the Fire by Portobello Books in the U.K. and Hogarth in the U.S. McDowell also translated the earlier Los peligros de fumar en la cama as The Dangers of Smoking in Bed in 2021.

In 2019, she won the Premio Herralde for her fourth novel, Nuestra parte de noche (translated as Our Share of Night). In 2024 she won the Platinum Konex Award for her work in the last decade in Argentina.

In June 2025, Netflix announced a miniseries in production based on Enríquez's short stories, to be titled My Sad Dead and directed by Pablo Larraín.

== Personal life ==
Mariana Enríquez is married to Paul, who is originally from Western Australia. They met while he was on a six-year journey cycling around the world to raise awareness of the debt crisis in the global south. The couple married under a concrete highway overpass in Buenos Aires.

In 2025, Paul and Enríquez relocated to Launceston, Tasmania.

== Bibliography ==
=== Novels ===
- Enríquez, Mariana (1995). Bajar es lo peor (in Spanish). Espasa-Calpe.
- — (2004). Cómo desaparecer completamente (in Spanish). Emecé.
- — (2017). Éste es el mar (in Spanish). Random House.
- — (2019). Nuestra parte de noche (in Spanish). Anagrama.
  - Translated as: Enríquez, Mariana (2023). Our Share of Night. Translated by Megan McDowell. Penguin Random House.

=== Short fiction ===
==== Collections ====
- Enríquez, Mariana (2009). Los peligros de fumar en la cama (in Spanish). Emecé.
  - Translated as: Enríquez, Mariana (2021). The Dangers of Smoking in Bed. Translated by Megan McDowell. Penguin Random House.
- — (2016). Las cosas que perdimos en el fuego (in Spanish). Anagrama.
  - Translated as: Enríquez, Mariana (2017). Things We Lost in the Fire. Translated by Megan McDowell. Portobello Books.
- — (2024). Un lugar soleado para gente sombría (in Spanish). Buenos Aires, Argentina: Anagrama.
  - Translated as: Enríquez, Mariana (2024). A Sunny Place for Shady People. Translated by Megan McDowell. Penguin Random House. Winner of the 2025 World Fantasy Award for Best Collection.

==== Novelettes ====
- Enríquez, Mariana (2010). Chicos que vuelven (in Spanish). Eduvim.
- — (2019). Ese verano a oscuras (in Spanish). Illustrated by Helia Toledo. Páginas de Espuma.

==== Short stories ====
Title	Year	First published	Reprinted/collected
The Intoxicated Years	2015	Enríquez, Mariana (2015-10-05). "The Intoxicated Years". Granta Magazine. Translated by McDowell, Megan.	Things We Lost in the Fire
Spiderweb	2016	Enríquez, Mariana (December 19–26, 2016). "Spiderweb". The New Yorker. 92 (42). Translated by McDowell, Megan: 106–113.	Things We Lost in the Fire
The Well	2019	Enríquez, Mariana (2019-01-15). "The Well". Southern Review. Translated by McDowell, Megan.	The Dangers of Smoking in Bed
Our Lady of the Quarry	2020	Enríquez, Mariana (December 21, 2020). "Our Lady of the Quarry". The New Yorker. 96 (41). Translated by McDowell, Megan: 60–64.	The Dangers of Smoking in Bed
My Sad Dead	2023	Enríquez, Mariana (February 13–20, 2023). "My Sad Dead". The New Yorker. 99 (1). Translated by McDowell, Megan: 72–79.	A Sunny Place for Shady People

=== Non-fiction ===
- Enríquez, Mariana (2014). Alguien camina sobre tu tumba: mis viajes a cementerios (in Spanish). Galerna.
  - Translated as: Enríquez, Mariana (2025). Somebody Is Walking on Your Grave: My Cemetery Journeys. Translated by Megan McDowell. Hogarth. ISBN 9780593733516.
- — (2018). La hermana menor: un retrato de Silvina Ocampo (in Spanish). Anagrama.
- — (2020). El otro lado: retratos, fetichismos, confesiones (in Spanish). Argentina: Anagrama.
- — (2023). Porque demasiado no es suficiente. Mi historia de amor con Suede (in Spanish). Chile: Montacerdos.
- — (2025). Archipiélago (in Spanish). Argentina: Ampersand.

———————
