= Megan McDowell =

American literary translator

Megan McDowell (Kentucky, 1978) is an American literary translator. She principally translates Spanish-language works into English.

She is known for her translations of contemporary writers such as Mariana Enriquez, Samantha Schweblin and Alejandro Zambra. Her translations have won the National Book Award for Translated Literature, the English PEN award, the Premio Valle-Inclán, and two O. Henry Prizes, and have been nominated for the International Booker Prize (four times) and the Kirkus Prize. Her short story translations have been featured in The New Yorker, The Paris Review, The New York Times Magazine, Tin House, McSweeney's and Granta, among others.

== Personal life ==
Originally from Kentucky, she studied English at DePaul University in Chicago. Upon graduation, she worked at the Dalkey Archive Press. She then moved to Chile with the intention of learning Spanish and editing translated literature. Three years later McDowell returned to the US to study a master's degree in Liberal Arts focusing on translation at UT Dallas. She then lived briefly in Salt Lake City and Durham. After that, she spent eight months in Portugal and Switzerland. Now, McDowell lives and works in Santiago de Chile.

== Career ==
Her career started with the translation of Alejandro Zambra's The Private Lives of Trees, which she asked the author to translate personally. Since then, she has collaborated with Zambra on the translation of eight more books, including the challenging Multiple Choice (2016). McDowell has expressed her interest in working directly with the writers she translates to provide the most faithful translation possible.

Although McDowell has translated a couple of books from peninsular Spanish — Among the Hedges (2021) by Sara Mesa and Divorce Is in the Air (2016) by Gonzalo Torné — she feels more comfortable translating hispanoamerican authors since she is more familiar, not only with these dialects, but also with cultural references. For this reason, she has repeatedly translated the same handful of authors.

== Translations ==
- The Mysterious Disappearance of the Marquise of Loria by José Donoso, New Directions, 2025
- Childish Literature by Alejandro Zambra, Penguin/Granta, 2024
- A Loving Place for Shady People by Mariana Enriquez, Hogarth/Granta, 2024
- The Obscene Bird of Night by José Donoso, New Directions, 2024
- My Documents by Alejandro Zambra, Penguin Press, 2024
- Austral by Carlos Fonseca, FSG/MacLehose, 2023
- Our Share of Night by Mariana Enriquez
- Seven Empty Houses by Samanta Schweblin, Riverhead/One World, 2023
- Chilean Poet by Alejandro Zambra, Viking/Granta, 2022
- Yesterday by Juan Emar, Pereine Press, 2021
- Nervous System by Lina Meruane, Graywolf Press, 2021
- Among the Hedges by Sara Mesa, Open Letter, 2021
- The Dangers of Smoking in Bed by Mariana Enriquez, Granta/Penguin, 2021
- Natural History by Carlos Fonseca Suarez, FSG, 2020
- My Favorite Girlfriend was a French Bulldog by Legna Rodriguez Iglesias, 2020
- Little Eyes by Samanta Schweblin, Riverhead, 2020
- Mouthful of Birds by Samanta Schweblin, One World, 2019
- Humiliation by Paulina Flores, Catapult/One World, 2019
- The Crossed-Out Notebook by Nico Giacobone, Scribner, 2019
- Older Brother by Daniel Mella, Charco Press, 2018
- Not to Read by Alejandro Zambra, Fitzcarraldo Editions, 2018
- The Son of Black Thursday by Alejandro Jodorowsky, Restless Books, 2018
- Camanchaca by Diego Zúñiga, Coffee House Press, 2017
- Fever Dream by Samanta Schweblin, Riverhead Books/One World, 2017
- Loving Pablo, Hating Escobar by Virginia Vallejo, Canongate Books, 2017
- Things We Lost in the Fire by Mariana Enriquez, Hogarth/Granta, 2017
- Divorce Is in the Air by Gonzalo Torné, Knopf, 2016
- Colonel Lágrimas by Carlos Fonseca Suarez, Restless Books, 2016
- Fantasia by Alejandro Zambra, Ediciones Metales Pesados, 2016
- Multiple Choice by Alejandro Zambra, Penguin, 2016
- Seeing Red by Lina Meruane, Deep Vellum, 2016
- Dead Stars by Álvaro Bisama, Ox and Pigeon Press, 2014
- Ways of Going Home by Alejandro Zambra, FSG, 2013
- Under This Terrible Sun by Carlos Busqued, Frisch and Co., 2013
- Natural History by Carlos Fonseca Suarez
- La Vida Doble by Arturo Fontaine, Yale Margellos World Republic of Letters, 2013
- The Private Lives of Trees by Alejandro Zambra, Open Letter, 2010

== Recognition and awards ==
- Winner of the 2022 National Book Award for Translated Literature for Seven Empty Houses by Samanta Schweblin
- Winner of two O. Henry Prize in 2022 for Short Fiction
- Shortlisted for the 2021 Kirkus Prize for The Dangers of Smoking in Bed by Mariana Enriquez
- Shortlisted for the 2021 Man Booker International Prize for The Dangers of Smoking in Bed by Mariana Enriquez
- 2020 Literature Award from the American Academy of Arts and Letters
- Longlisted for the 2020 Man Booker International Prize for Little Eyes by Samanta Schweblin
- Longlisted for the 2019 Man Booker International Prize for Mouthful of Birds by Samanta Schweblin
- Winner of the 2018 Premio Valle-Inclan for Seeing Red by Lina Meruane
- Shortlisted for the 2017 Man Booker International Prize for Fever Dream by Samanta Schweblin
- Winner of the 2013 English PEN Translates Award for Ways of Going Home by Alejandro Zambra
