= Yael Inokai =

Swiss writer

- Yael Inokai in 2026
- Born: Yael Pieren; 1989 (age 36–37); Basel, Switzerland
- Education: Deutsche Film- und Fernsehakademie Berlin
- Occupation: Writer
- Writing career
- Notable awards: Swiss Literature Awards (2018); Anna Seghers Prize (2022); Clemens-Brentano-Preis (2023)

Yael Inokai (born 1989 in Basel as Yael Pieren) is a Swiss writer.

== Biography ==
Yael Inokai is the daughter of a Hungarian father and a German mother. From 2011 she studied philosophy in Basel and Vienna. From 2014, she studied screenwriting at the Deutsche Film- und Fernsehakademie Berlin. She also works as a tour guide and has published articles in literary magazines and on Zeit Online. In 2012, her first novel, Stork Bite (German: Storchenbiss), was published by Rotpunktverlag. In 2013, Inokai received a residency scholarship for the Literary Colloquium Berlin. In 2015, she became the Hildesheim Stadtschreiber on a nomination from the local magazine Bella triste. Her second novel Maelstrom (German: Mahlstrom), published in 2017, was awarded one of the highly endowed Swiss Literature Awards in 2018. In October 2018, she further received the Würth Literature Prize (2nd prize) for the short story "The Foreigner" (German: Der Ausländer), awarded by the Würth company in cooperation with the University of Tübingen. Inokai's novel Mahlstrom was also adapted as a radio play by SRF in 2019 and broadcast in January 2020. It was also broadcast by Deutschlandfunk Kultur in December 2020.

In 2020, she wrote the short story "The Decent One" (German: Der Anständige) for the ARD Radio Festival.

The novel A Simple Intervention (German: Ein simpler Eingriff) was published in Berlin in 2022. In it, Inokai tells from the perspective of a nurse about lesbian love and a society that makes people sick and thinks it can heal them by means of surgical interventions. With special reference to this novel, Inokai was awarded one of the two Anna Seghers Prizes in 2022.

In 2026, the author's fourth novel, The Oyster (German: Die Auster), was published.

Inokai is the director of textual studies in Berlin.

== Awards ==
- Swiss Literature Award for Maelstrom (2018)
- Anna Seghers Prize for A Simple Intervention (2022)
- Longlist for the German Book Prize with A Simple Intervention (2022)
- Clemens-Brentano-Preis for A Simple Intervention (2023)

== Bibliography ==
- Pieren, Yael (2012). Storchenbiss (Roman). Zürich: Rotpunktverlag. ISBN 978-3-85869-494-2.
- Inokai, Yael (2017). Mahlstrom (Roman). Zürich: Rotpunktverlag. ISBN 978-3-85869-769-1.
- Inokai, Yael (2019). Rampa, Nicole (ed.). Passing through (Schweizer Kulturschaffende in New York). St. Gallen, Berlin: Vexer Verlag. ISBN 978-3-907112-05-2.
- Inokai, Yael (2022). Ein simpler Eingriff (Roman). Berlin: Hanser. ISBN 978-3-446-27231-6.
- Inokai, Yael (2023). "Die Vertreterin". In Gneuß, Charlotte; Weber, Laura (eds.). Glückwunsch. 15 Erzählungen über Abtreibung. Berlin: Hanser. pp. 13–24. ISBN 978-3-446-27677-2.
- Inokai, Yael (2026). Die Auster (Roman). Berlin: Hanser. ISBN 978-3-446-28459-3.
