= Róža Domašcyna =

Sorbian translator, poet and writer

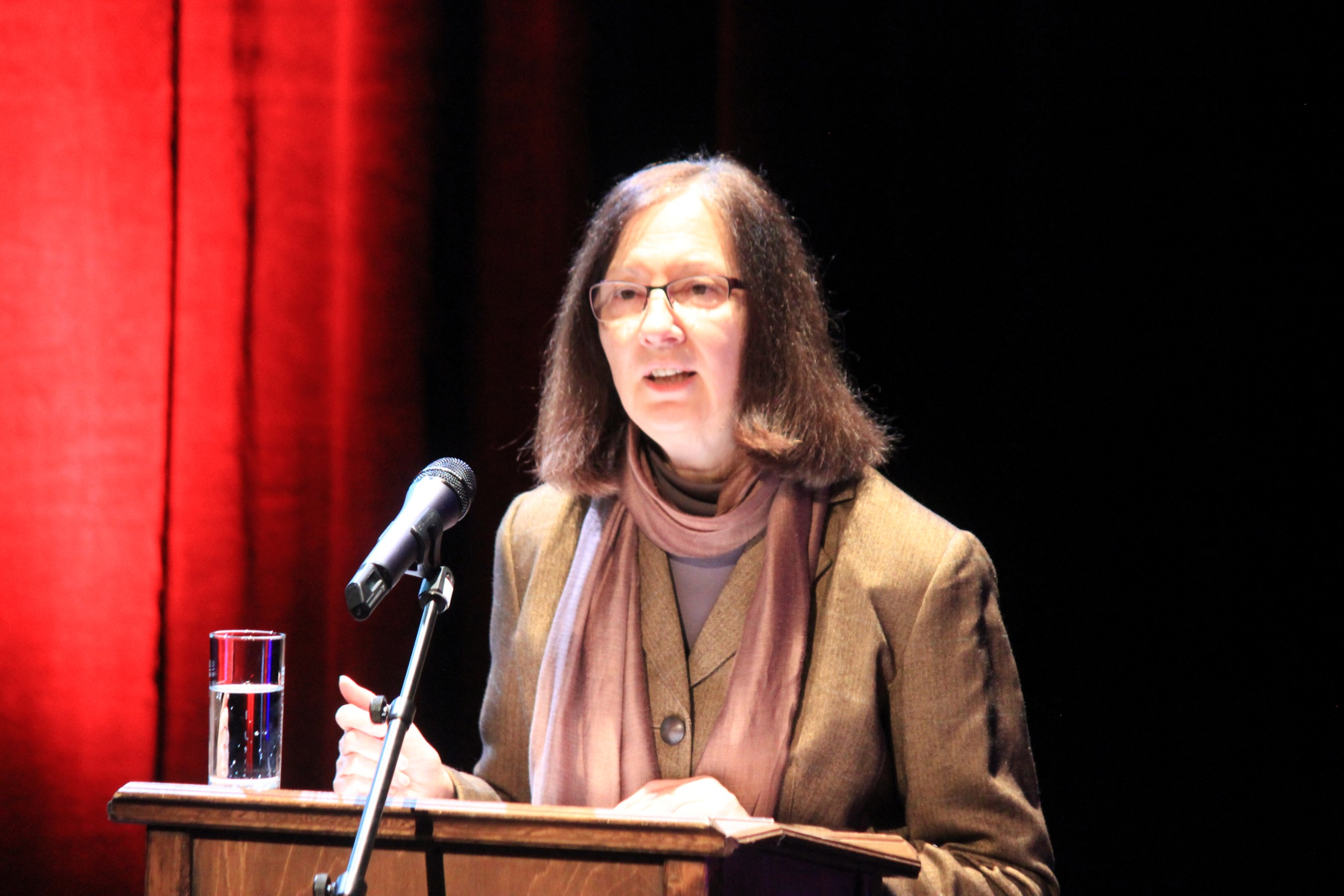
Róža Domašcyna

Róža Domašcyna (11 August 1951, in Zerna, East Germany) is a poet, translator and writer. She writes in German and in the Upper Sorbian language. Winner of the promotional award for Ćišinski-Preis and Anna Seghers Prize (1998).

== Works ==
- Wróćo ja doprědka du (English: I go back to the front), 1990
- Zaungucker, 1991
- Pře wšě płoty (English: Over all fences), 1994
- Zwischen gangbein und springbein, 1995
- Der Hase im Ärmel, Illustration: Angela Hampel, 1997, 2011
- Selbstredend selbzweit selbdritt, 1998
- Kunstgriff am netzwerg, 1999
- Pobate bobate, 1999
- "sp", 2001
- MY NA AGRA, 2004
- stimmfaden, 2006
- Balonraketa (two texts for the theater), 2008
- ort der erdung, 2011
- «Prjedy hač woteńdźeš», 2011.
- Štož ći wětřik z ruki wěje, 2012
- Feldlinien, 2014
- Die dörfer unter wasser sind in deinem kopf beredt, 2016
- znaki pominaki kopolaki (together with Měrana Cušcyna and Měrka Mětowa), 2019
- W času zeza časa, 2019
- stimmen aus der unterbühne, 2020
- Poesiealbum 354, 2020

== Literature ==
- Dichtung des 20. Jahrhunderts: Meine 24 sächsischen Dichter, Hrsg. Gerhard Pötzsch, 2 CDs, Militzke Verlag Leipzig 2009, ISBN 978-3-86189-935-8
- Dueck, Cheryl. "Selbstredend selbzweit selbdritt: Serpentine selves in the poetry of Róža Domašcyna." Canadian Slavonic Papers 45, no. 3-4 (2003): 283–294.
