= Samanta Schweblin =

Argentine writer (born 1978)

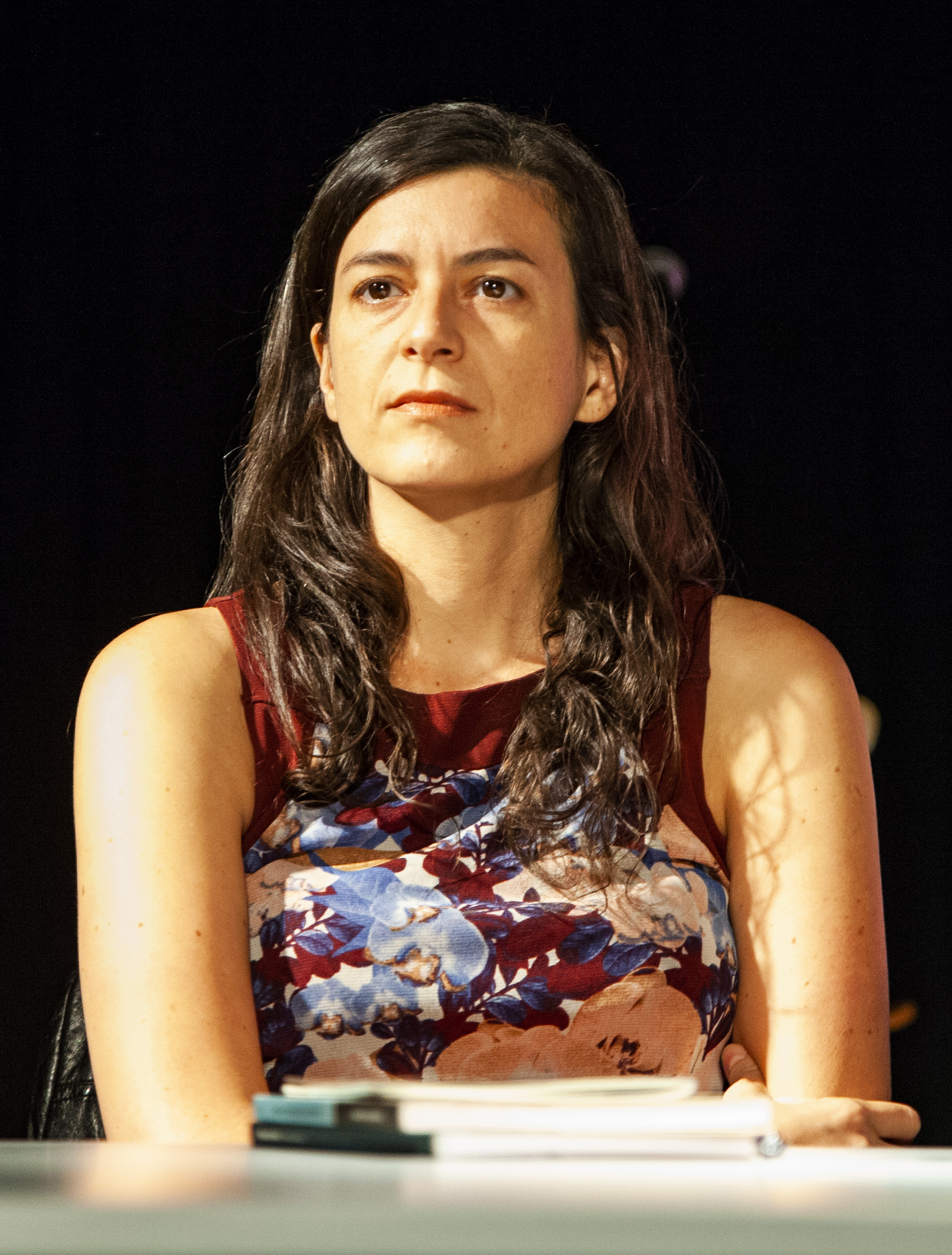
- Born: 1978 (age 47–48); Buenos Aires, Argentina
- Education: Film studies
- Alma mater: University of Buenos Aires
- Occupation: Writer
- Writing career
- Language: Spanish
- Genres: Short story, novel
- Notable works: Distancia de Rescate; Mouthful of Birds; Kentukis
- Notable awards: National Book Award for Translated Literature

Samanta Schweblin (born 1978) is an Argentine author currently based in Berlin, Germany. She has published three collections of short stories, a novella and a novel, besides stories that have appeared in anthologies and magazines such as The New Yorker, The Paris Review, Granta, The Drawbridge, Harper’s Magazine and McSweeney’s. She has won numerous awards around the world and her books have been translated into more than forty languages and adapted for film.

== Life and career ==
In 2002, Schweblin published her first book El núcleo del Disturbio (The Nucleus of Disturbances), which won an award from Argentina's National Endowment for the Arts. In 2008, she won the Casa de las Américas award for her short-story collection Mouthful of Birds. Her third collection of short-stories, Siete casas vacías (Seven Empty Houses) was published in 2015. Her first novel Distancia de Rescate, literally “Rescue distance”, but translated into English as Fever Dream, won the 2015 Tigre Juan Award and the 2017 Shirley Jackson Award for Best Novella, and was shortlisted for the 2017 Man Booker International Prize.

In 2019, she was nominated for the Man Booker International Prize for the English translation by American literary translator Megan McDowell of Mouthful of Birds. In 2020, she was again longlisted for the Man Booker International Prize, for Kentukis (Little Eyes), also translated by McDowell.

Her novel Distancia de Rescate was adapted into a film by Netflix in 2021, directed by Claudia Llosa and with the screenplay co-written by Llosa and the author.

In the winter semester of 2020/2021, she held the Samuel Fischer guest professorship for literature in the Peter Szondi-Institut für Allgemeine und Vergleichende Literaturwissenschaft at the Free University of Berlin. In 2022, she won the National Book Award for Translated Literature for Seven Empty Houses.

A new short story collection, Good and Evil and Other Stories, was translated into English by McDowell and released on August 28, 2025, in the UK and on September 16, 2025, in the US.

On April 8, 2026, Schweblin was awarded first prize in the Aena Hispano-American Narrative Award for her book El Buen Mal, receiving 1 million euros.

== Bibliography ==
- 2002, El núcleo del disturbio (ISBN 950-732-034-2)
- 2009, Pájaros en la boca (ISBN 978-84-264-1748-0)
  - Also published as La Furia de las pestes (ISBN 978-95-926-0240-3)
  - Translated by Megan McDowell as Mouthful of Birds (2019) (ISBN 978-03-991-8462-8)
- 2014, Distancia de rescate (ISBN 978-987-3650-44-4)
  - Translated by Megan McDowell as Fever Dream (2017) (ISBN 9780399184598) Shirley Jackson Award
- 2015, Siete casas vacías (ISBN 978-84-8393-185-1)
  - Translated by Megan McDowell as Seven Empty Houses (2022) (ISBN 9780525541394)
- 2018, Kentukis (ISBN 978-84-3973-489-5)
  - Translated by Megan McDowell as Little Eyes (2020) (ISBN 978-17-860-7792-9)
- 2025 El buen mal
  - Good and Evil and Other Stories. Translated by Megan McDowell. New York: Random House. 16 September 2025. ISBN 978-0-593-80310-3.

== Awards and honors ==
- 2022: National Book Award for Translated Literature for Seven Empty Houses
- 2024: Royal Society of Literature International Writer
- 2026: Aena Prize for Hispanic American Narrative
