= Lina Meruane =

Chilean-Palestinian writer and professor (born 1970)

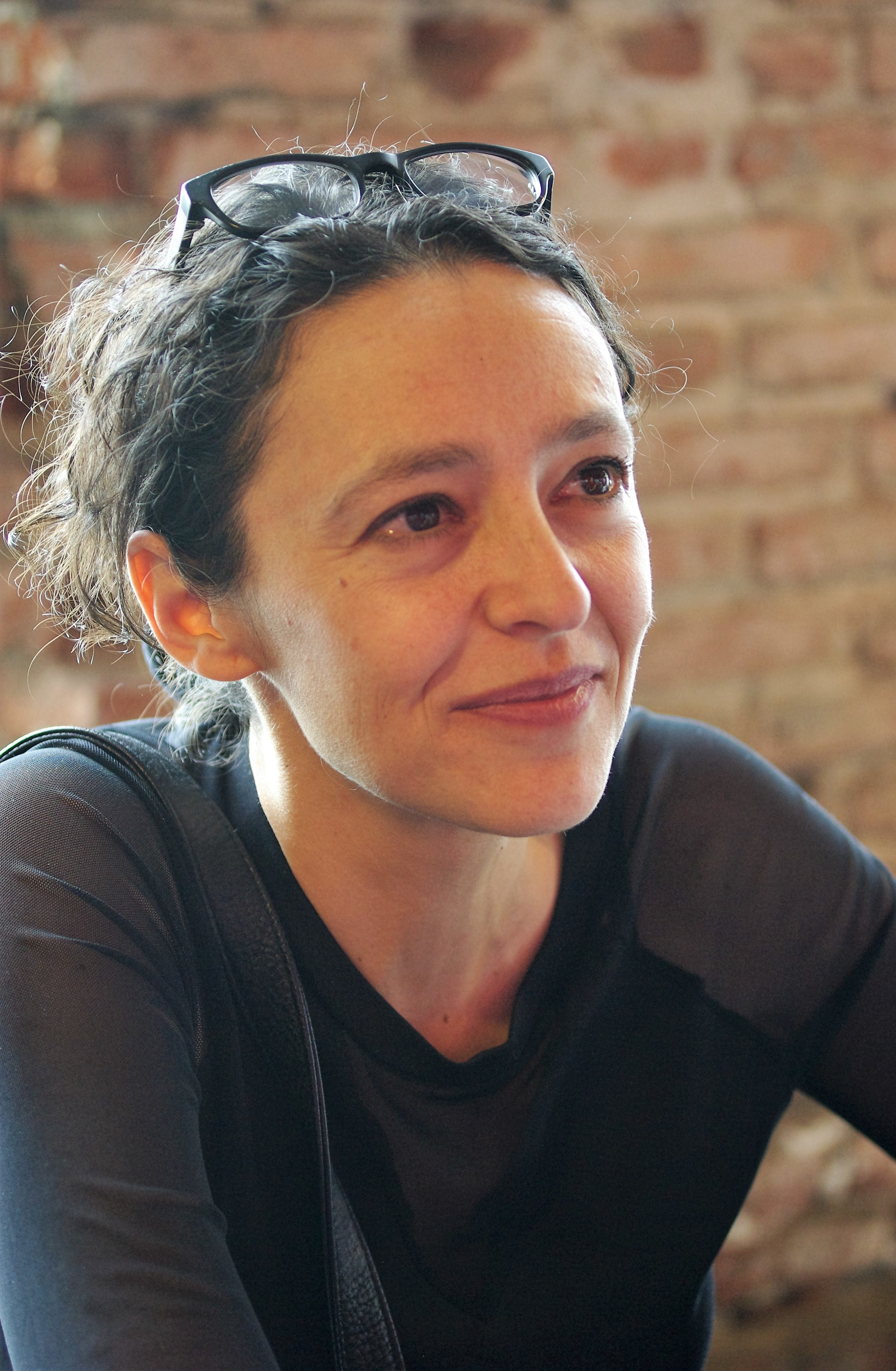
- 2016
- Born: Lina Meruane Boza; 1970 (age 55–56); Santiago, Chile
- Education: New York University
- Occupations: Writer, professor
- Notable work: Fruta podrida (2007); Sangre en el ojo (2012)
- Family: Ricardo Meruane (uncle); Nelly Meruane (great-aunt)
- Awards: Anna Seghers-Preis (2011); Sor Juana Inés de la Cruz Prize (2012)

Lina Meruane Boza (born 1970) is a Chilean writer and professor. Her work, written in Spanish, has been translated into 12 languages --English, Italian, Portuguese, German, French and Arabic, among others. In 2011 she won the Anna Seghers-Preis for the quality of her work, in 2012 the Sor Juana Inés de la Cruz Prize for her novel Sangre en el ojo.

== Biography ==
Born in Santiago, Chile, Lina Meruane is of Palestinian and Italian descent. She is the niece of actress Nelly Meruane and comedian Ricardo Meruane.

She started writing as a storyteller and cultural journalist. In 1997 she received a writing grant from FONDART to finish her first book of stories. The following year she published Las infantas, a book that received a very positive critique from Chilean reviewers, as well as writer Roberto Bolaño:

There is a generation of (Chilean) writers who promise to devour it all. At the head, clearly, two stand out. These are Lina Meruane and Alejandra Costamagna, followed by Nona Fernández and five or six other young women armed with all the implements of good literature.

— Roberto Bolaño, February 1999

Meruane published two novels before leaving for New York to do her doctorate studies in Spanish-American literature at New York University. In the United States she received a fellowship from the Guggenheim Foundation in 2004 (for the novel Fruta Podrida), and another in 2010 from the National Endowment for the Arts (for Sangre en el ojo).

In 2011 she received the Anna Seghers-Preis, and the following year she won the 20th Sor Juana Inés de la Cruz Prize for Sangre en el ojo, during the Guadalajara International Book Fair, with a jury made up of the writers Yolanda Arroyo Pizarro, Antonio Ortuño, and Cristina Rivera Garza.

Meruane has lived in New York since 2000. As of 2026 she teaches Creative Writing in Spanish and Latin American Cultures, Arts and Cultures at New York University.

== Grants and awards ==
- 1997: Grant. National Council for the Arts, FONDART, Chile, for Las Infantas (National Council of Culture and the Arts)
- 2004: Grant. John Simon Guggenheim Foundation. Latin American and Caribbean Fellowship for Fruta podrida
- 2006: Award. Best Unpublished Novel, for Fruta podrida (National Council of Culture and the Arts)
- 2010: Grant. National Endowment for the Arts, NEA, for Seeing Red.
- 2011: Award. Anna Seghers-Preis, por her literary work
- 2012: Award. Sor Juana Inés de la Cruz Prize, for Sangre en el ojo
- 2015: Award. Institute of Chilean-Arab Culture Award, for Volverse Palestina
- 2015: Award. Cálamo Another Look, for Fruta podrida (Zaragoza)
- 2017: Grant. Artists-in-Berlin Program, Deutscher Akademischer Austauschdienst DAAD (German Academic Exchange Service; for Sistema Nervioso.
- 2023: Award. Premio José Donoso

== Works ==
=== Short stories ===
- Las infantas, Planeta, Santiago, Chile, 1998 (Eterna Cadencia, Argentina, 2010), ISBN 9789871673070
- Avidez, Paginas de Espuma, Spain, 2024

=== Novels translated into English ===
- Seeing Red translated by Megan McDowell, Deep Vellum, USA (Atlantic Books, UK, 2016), ISBN 9781941920251; original edition Sangre en el ojo
- Nervous System translated by Megan McDowell, Graywolf, USA, 2021 (Atlantic Books, UK, 2021); original edition Sistema Nervioso

=== Novels in original Spanish ===
- Póstuma, Planeta, Santiago, 2000 (Oficina Do Livro, Portugal, 2001)
- Cercada, Cuarto Propio, Santiago, 2000 (Cuneta Editores, Santiago, 2014 with prologue by Lorena Amaro)
- Fruta podrida, Fondo de Cultura Económica, Santiago, 2007 (Eterna Cadencia, 2015), ISBN 9789562890601
- Sangre en el ojo, Caballo de Troya, Spain, 2012 (Penguin Random House, 2015)
- Sistema Nervioso, Penguin Random House, Chile & Spain, 2019

=== Drama ===
- Un lugar donde caerse muerta / Not a leg to stand on, dramatic adaptation of the novel Fruta podrida by the author and the Chilean theater director Martín Balmaceda; bilingual edition with prologue by Guillermo Calderón and English translation by Sarah Thomas, Diaz Grey Editores, 2012 (Trópico Sur, Uruguay, 2013)

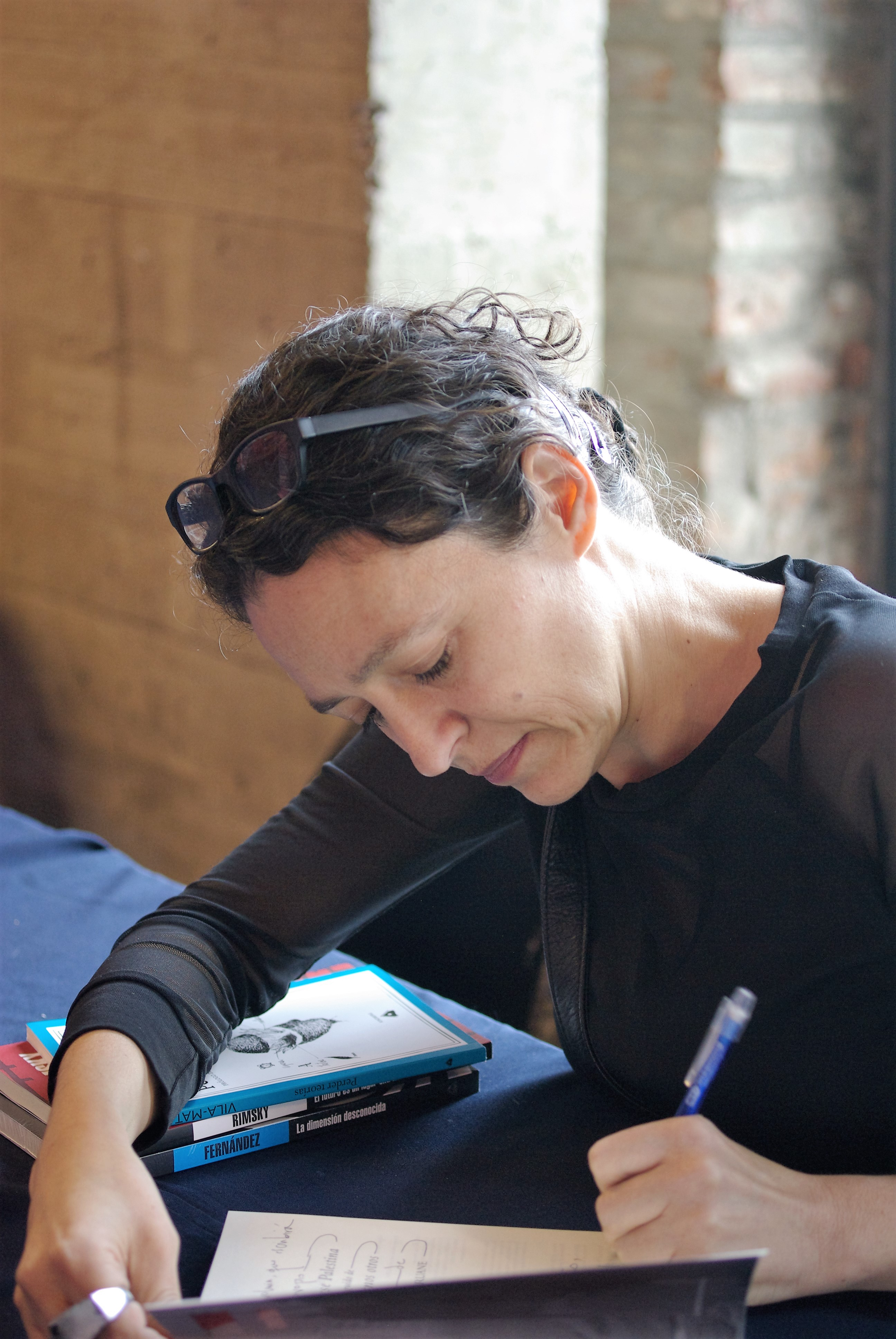
Meruane signing her books at the 2016 Puerto de Ideas cultural festival

=== Nonfiction ===
- Viral Voyages. Tracing AIDS in Latin America, translated by Andrea Rosenberg, Palgrave MacMillan, 2014, ISBN 9781137394996; original edition Viajes virales: la crisis del contagio global en la escritura del sida, essay, Fondo de Cultura Económica, Santiago 2012, ISBN 9789562891042
- Volverse palestina, chronicle, Literal Publishing, USA / Conaculta, Mexico, 2013, ISBN 9789568228866
- Palestina en Pedazos, chronicle/personal essay; Literatura Random House, Santiago, 2021
- Contra los hijos, essay-diatribe, Tumbona, Mexico, 2014, ISBN 9789569766626 and Penguin Random House, 2018 ISBN 9788439734062
- Zona Ciega, essay, Penguin Random House, 2021
- Coloquio de las quiltras, essay, Debate, 2024

=== Visual essays ===
- Cinco personas en busca de su personaje, ongoing project, first part directed by Luciano Piazza

=== In English language journals ===
Two Lines (California), Bomb (New York), The Literary Review (New York), Brick (Canada), N+1 (New York), Words without Borders (New York), Drunken Boat (US), The White Review (UK), Litro Magazine (UK), Brown Book (Arab Emirates), Asymptote (US), among others in several languages.
