= Rosa Catrileo =

Mapuche lawyer in Chile

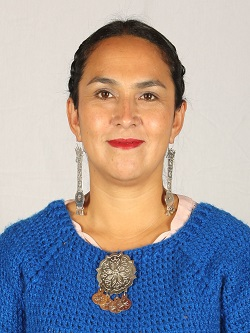
- Rosa Catrileo member Chilean Constituent Assembly

Member of the Constitutional Convention of Chile
- In office July 4, 2021 – 4 July 2022
- Preceded by: office established

Personal details
- Born: Rosa Catrileo Arias; 1981 (age 44–45) Temuco, Chile
- Occupation: Politician

Rosa Catrileo Arias (born 1981) is a Mapuche lawyer and politician who serves as a member of the Chilean Constitutional Convention. As an attorney, she has primarily focused on protecting indigenous land rights in the Mapuche conflict.

== Biography ==
Rosa Catrileo was born in Temuco, Araucanía Region to a Mapuche family. Her father was a teacher who taught in rural Mapuche communities, and Catrileo has stated that she grew up in an entirely Mapuche community. In a 2021 interview, Catrileo explained that attending a high school in which she was one of the few Mapuche students had a major impact on the development of her identity:

"There were children there who were not Mapuche, teachers who were not Mapuche. My family on my mother's side is not Mapuche either, so then one begins to realize that the first surname, which is Catrileo, carries a mark, a difference . There with my brothers we began to realize this belonging to a different people, to a different culture..."

Catrileo received her degree in law as well as a diploma in the discipline of human rights from Temuco Catholic University (UCT). Additionally, Catrileo has received a master's degree in law from the University of Chile. Catrileo stated that she initially aspired to be a history teacher, but chose to enter the field of law in order to advocate for the welfare of the Mapuche people.

== Constitutional Convention ==
In 2021, Catrileo was elected to one of the reserved seats for the Mapuche people on the Constitutional Convention of Chile. Catrileo was elected with 4.78% of votes cast among the Mapuche electorate, making her one of seven Mapuche representatives in the body. Catrileo has spoken against party politics, stating that she refuses to be under the "tutelage" of a political party or faction, and that she is solely committed to advancing the rights of the Mapuche people. During the election for President of the Constitutional Convention, Catrileo supported fellow Mapuche activist Elisa Loncón, who was ultimately elected.

=== Political views ===
As a member of the Constitutional Convention, Catrileo has pushed for constitutional reforms that would safeguard indigenous culture, especially in the realm of language rights. While noting that the teaching of the Mapudungun language is not formally prohibited in schools, she argues that the continued suppression of the language, including in public schools where instruction is minimal, amounts to "Castilianization".

While speaking in favor of the principle of plurinational, Catrileo has expressed her concern that current proposals for the establishment of a "plurinational state" in Chile would merely amount to recognition of indigenous cultures without giving real power to indigenous communities. Catrileo has criticized the supposed "plurinational models" implemented in Bolivia and Ecuador, which she considers to have had little material benefit for indigenous peoples. Catrileo argued that:

"If plurinationality is the mere recognition that there are indigenous peoples, it does not serve us much"

Catrileo favors the repatriation of traditional indigenous lands that were confiscated by the Chilean state. She has noted that the creation of the national park system in Chile involved the displacement of the Mapuche from their ancestral territory, stating that the Chilean state "[took] away from them what had always been theirs".

== Personal life ==
Catrileo has stated that she can not speak the Mapudungun language, but can understand it and grew up around older family members who solely conversed in the language. Catrileo's partner and father of her three children, Julio Matrileo, was convicted under the State Internal Security Law, which she has stated was an act of political repression.
