= Carlos Fonseca Suárez =

Costa Rican writer

Carlos Fonseca
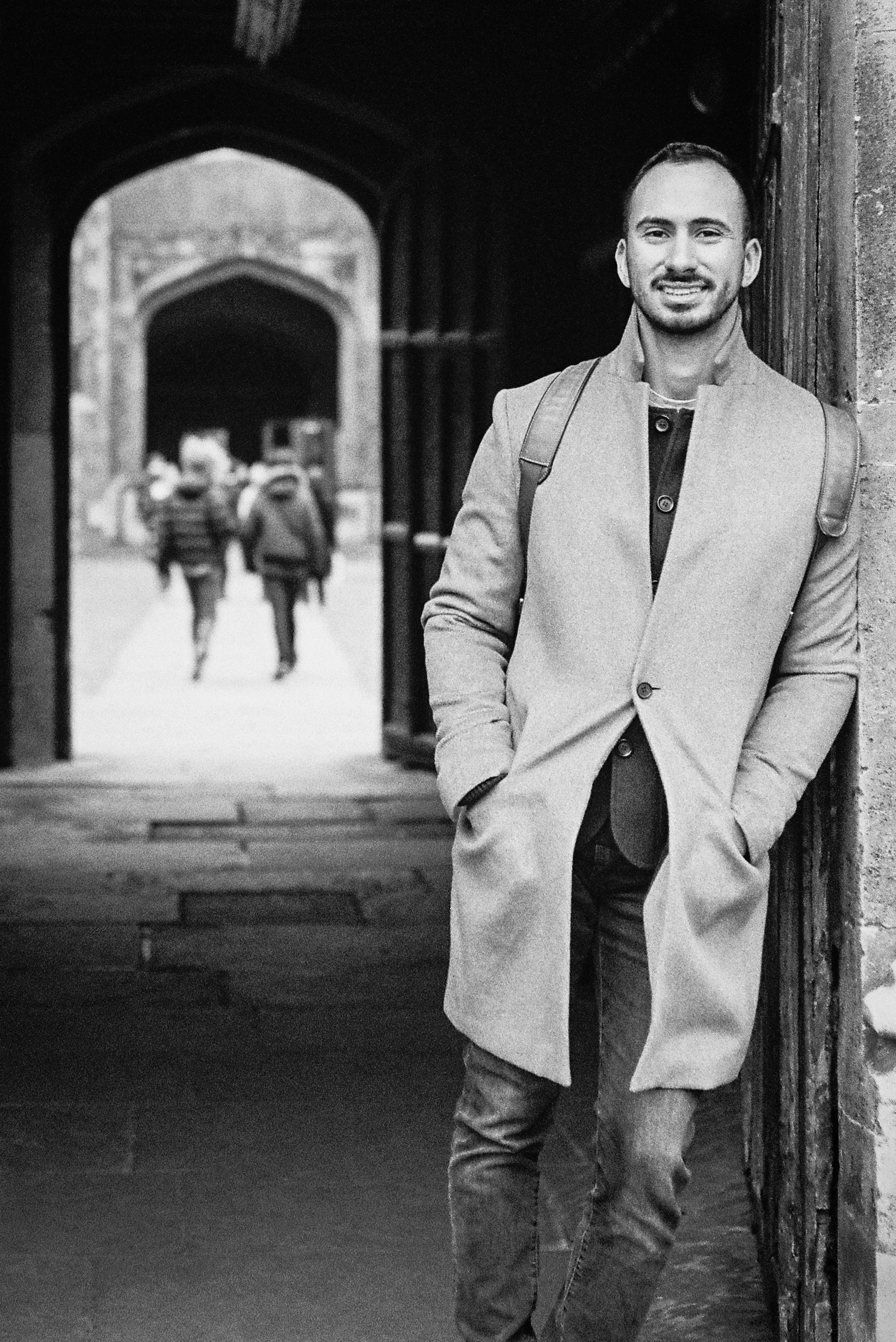
- Fonseca Suárez in 2019
- Born: 19 February 1987 (age 39); San José, Costa Rica
- Education: Stanford University (BA) Princeton University (PhD)
- Occupation: Author
- Writing career
- Period: 2015–present

Carlos Manuel Fonseca Suárez (born 19 February 1987, in San José, Costa Rica) is a Costa Rican-Puerto Rican writer and academic. He is the author of the novels Colonel Lágrimas, Museo animal, and Austral. In 2016, he was selected by the Guadalajara International Book Fair as one of the top twenty Latin American authors born in the eighties. In 2017, he was selected by the Hay Festival as one of the top thirty-nine Latin American authors under forty. In 2021, he was selected by Granta magazine as one of their Best Young Spanish-Language Novelists. He was also chosen by Encyclopædia Britannica as part of their Young Shapers of the Future 20 Under 40 Initiative, as one of the top twenty young international authors.

== Biography ==
Fonseca Suárez was born in San José, Costa Rica in 1987. Born to a Costa Rican father and a Puerto Rican mother, he spent his childhood and adolescence in Puerto Rico.

After attending high school at Colegio San Ignacio in Puerto Rico, he attended Stanford University where in 2009 he graduated with a degree in Comparative Literature. He then attended Princeton University where he obtained a PhD.

He is currently Assistant Professor in Postcolonial Latin American Literature and Culture at the University of Cambridge, as well as Fellow of Trinity College Dublin. He lives in Cambridge, United Kingdom with his family.

== Works ==
=== Colonel Lágrimas ===
His first novel, Colonel Lágrimas, published in Spain and Latin America by Anagrama and in English by Restless Books, was reviewed by The Guardian as "an allegory of our hyperinformed age and of the clash between European and Latin American history” and shortlisted by The New York Times Book Review. Loosely based on the life story of the eccentric mathematician Alexander Grothendieck, it tells the story of a man attempting to compose a total encyclopaedia.

=== Natural History ===
His second novel was published in Spain and Latin America by Anagrama as Museo animal, and in English (translated by Megan McDowell) by Farrar, Straus and Giroux. The New York Times, writing about the novel, said that “its plotting and Delphic aura suggest the paranoiac glitter of Don DeLillo, the cosmopolitan dread of Roberto Bolaño and the imaginative elasticity of Ricardo Piglia.” Kirkus Reviews, in a starred review, described it as "an elegant meditation on art, inconstancy, and hiding, with a deftly woven subtext of camouflage that emerges as the narrative progresses."

=== Austral ===
His third novel was published in Spain and Latin America by Anagrama as Austral, and in English (translated by Megan McDowell) by Farrar, Straus and Giroux (US) and MacLehose Press (UK). It was described by the Spanish newspaper El Mundo as “a brilliant inquiry in the archive of memory.”

=== La Lucidez del Miope ===
He is also the author of a book of essays, where he writes about the works of writers that have inspired him like Ricardo Piglia, W.G. Sebald, Roberto Bolaño, Marta Aponte Alsina, and Enrique Vila-Matas. This book won the Premio Nacional Aquileo J. Echevarría, Costa Rica’s national prize for literature, in the Essay category.

== Awards ==
- Premio Nacional Aquileo J. Echevarría for La Lucidez del Miope
- Granta Magazine’s Best Spanish-Language Novelists, 2021
- Hay Festival’s Bogotá 39 Selection, 2017
- Encyclopædia Britannica’s Young Shapers of the Future, 2020

== Bibliography ==
- Coronel Lágrimas (Anagrama, 2015). Translated by Megan McDowell as Colonel Lágrimas (Restless Books, 2016)
- Museo animal (Anagrama, 2017). Translated by Megan McDowell as Natural History (Farrar, Straus and Giroux, 2020)
- La Lucidez del Miope (Editorial Germinal, 2017)
- Austral (Anagrama, 2022). Translated by Megan McDowell as Austral (Farrar, Straus and Giroux, 2023 and MacLehose Press, 2023)

== See also ==
- Costa Rican literature
- List of Puerto Ricans
- List of Puerto Rican writers
- Puerto Rican literature
