= Tiziano Bruzzone =

Italian Association football player

Personal information
- Full name: Tiziano Bruzzone
- Date of birth: 19 August 1984 (age 42)
- Place of birth: Pisa, Italy
- Height: 1.85 m (6 ft 1 in)
- Position: Striker

Team information
- Current team: Orvietana

Youth career
- Cascina

Senior career*
Years	Team	Apps	(Gls)
2001–2007	Cascina	97	(33)
2007–2008	Cagliari	0	(0)
2008–2009	Pontedera	32	(4)
2009–2010	Forcoli	28	(5)
2010–2011	Fortis Juventus	11	(3)
2011–	Orvietana	13	(3)
- * Club domestic league appearances and goals as of 20:47, 10 January 2012 (UTC)

Tiziano Bruzzone (born 19 August 1984 in Pisa) is an Italian Association football player who currently plays for Orvietana in Italy's Serie D, having once been on the books at Cagliari in Serie A, though he never made a first team appearance. Before signing for Cagliari, he was nicknamed "the Luca Toni of Serie D".
