= Daniela Catrileo =

Chilean poet and professor

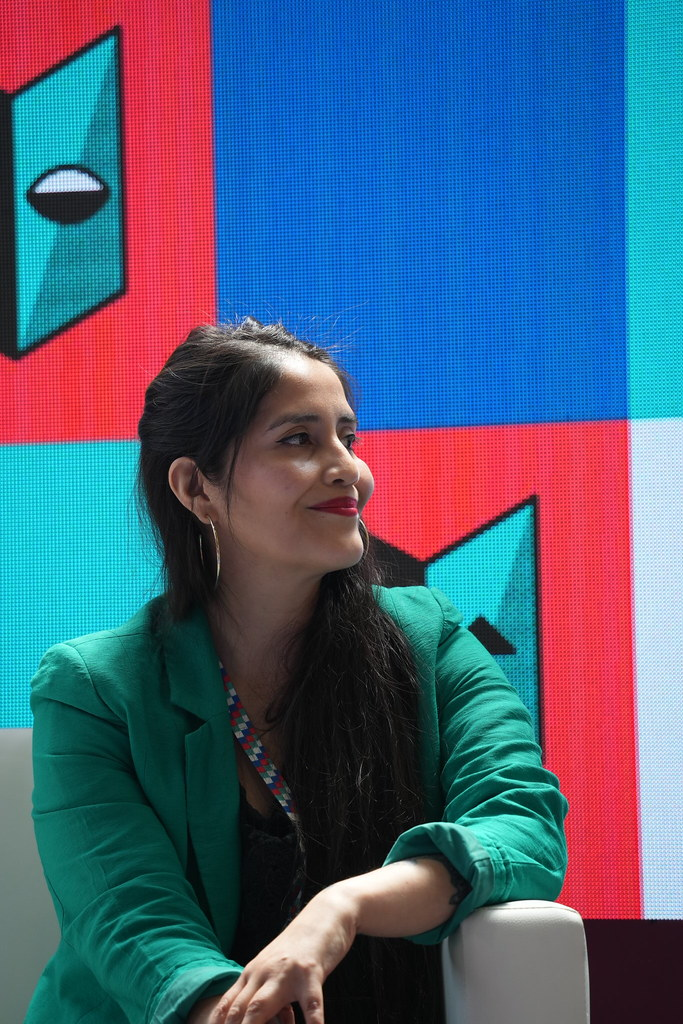
- Daniela Catrileo
- Born: Daniela Catrileo Cordero; 1987 (age 38–39); Santiago, or San Bernardo, Chile
- Occupations: Writer; Poet; Philosophy professor
- Known for: First Mapuche novelist published in English
- Awards: Premio Municipal de Literatura de Santiago (2019, 2024), Premio Anna Seghers (2026)

Daniela Catrileo Cordero (born 1987 in Santiago or San Bernardo, Chile) is a Chilean writer, poet and philosophy professor of Mapuche origin. She is a founding member of Rangiñtulewfü, a Mapuche diaspora collective, and a member of the editorial team of the magazine Yene. She has twice received the Premio Municipal de Literatura de Santiago, in 2019 for her poetry collection Guerra florida and in 2024 for her debut novel Chilco. In 2026 she received the German Anna Seghers Prize.

In December 2024, her novel Chilco was recommended by Dua Lipa through her cultural platform Service 95, which described it as the first novel by a Mapuche author to be published in English.

== Biography ==
=== Early life and education ===
Catrileo was born in 1987 in Santiago or San Bernardo, Chile. Her father's family comes from a Mapuche community in Nueva Imperial, La Araucanía, and her paternal grandfather moved to the capital in the 1970s. Her mother is not Mapuche. She grew up in San Bernardo, where her parents had access to social housing, and lived in Santiago until moving to Valparaiso in 2021.

From an early age she was interested in literature, participating in writing workshops during secondary school. At the age of 12 her mother gave her a typewriter. At 19, the discovery that her father had suffered harassment upon arriving in Santiago, which led him to stop speaking Mapudungun, together with the death of a relative in the south following a confrontation with police, sparked her interest in the representation of indigenous peoples in mass media and discrimination against Mapuche people.

Catrileo studied Education and Pedagogy in Philosophy at the Universidad Metropolitana de Ciencias de la Educacion. She holds a diploma in Cultural Journalism, Editing and Book Criticism from the University of Chile and a master's degree in American Aesthetics from the Pontificia Universidad Catolica de Chile.

In 2011 she received a scholarship from the Pablo Neruda Foundation.

=== Career ===
During her adolescence, before entering university, she participated in cultural spaces such as the Centro Cultural Manuel Rojas, Balmaceda Arte Joven and Caja Negra, where she performed poetry and music. She also formed the collective Florerito quebrado, which staged interventions involving breaking a vase, reading poetry and playing music.

Her first poetry collection, Rio herido (Edicola, 2016), takes its title from a translation of her surname from Mapudungun: Catrileo derives from katrun lewfu, meaning "cut river". It was inspired by conversations with her father and grandfather about their memories, particularly of migration.

In 2019 her collection Guerra florida (Del Aire, 2018), written in both Spanish and Mapudungun, received the Premio Municipal de Literatura de Santiago in the poetry category, making her the fourth Mapuche poet to receive the award. Her short story collection Pinen (2019) addresses gender stereotypes, domestic violence, racism toward Mapuche people and social inequality, and received the Premio Mejores Obras Literarias Publicadas in 2020.

In 2022 she became the first Mapuche person to serve on the Consejo Nacional de Television de Chile|Chilean National Television Council (CNTV).

In 2023 she published her debut novel Chilco (Seix Barral), which received the Premio Municipal de Literatura de Santiago in 2024. The novel tells the story of Marina, a woman of Quechua descent who works at a natural history museum, and her partner Pascale, of Lafkenche origin, as they struggle to find a place to call home in a city marked by inequality and corporate abuse. The English translation by Jacob Edelstein was published in July 2025, making it the first novel by a Mapuche author published in English. It was also translated into Danish.

=== Activism ===
Catrileo considers writing as a way of positioning herself politically and aesthetically as part of the Mapuche people. She is a founding member of Rangiñtulewfu, a Mapuche diaspora collective that includes artists Seba Calfuqueo, Paula Baeza Pailamilla and Paula Conoepan, which seeks to promote art created by Mapuche people and build political alliances with other oppressed peoples. From this collective emerged the magazine Yene, of which Catrileo is an editorial team member.

Catrileo identifies as a feminist and advocates for an intersectional, decolonial Latin American feminism that addresses colonialism and extractivism alongside gender issues.

== Works ==
=== Poetry and short stories ===
- Cada vigilia, plaquette, 2007
- Ninas con palillos, Balmaceda Arte Joven, 2014 (co-authored)
- Rio herido, Edicola, 2016. ISBN 9789569277375
- Invertebrada, LUMA Foundation, 2017. ISBN 978-1-387-06476-2
- Guerra florida / Rayulechi malon, Del Aire Editores, 2018. ISBN 9789569038341
- Pinen, Libros del Pez Espiral, 2019. ISBN 9789569147739
- Las aguas dejaron de unirse a otras aguas, plaquette, Pez Espiral, 2020
- El territorio de viaje, Edicola, 2022. ISBN 9789569277511 (bilingual Spanish-Mapudungun edition)
- Todas quisimos ser el sol, Las Guachas, 2023

=== Novel ===
- Chilco, Seix Barral, 2023. ISBN 9789566173786

=== Essay ===
- Sutura de las aguas. Un viaje especulativo sobre la impureza, Kikuyo, 2024

=== Audiovisual ===
- Mari Pura Warangka Kula Pataka Mari Meli: 18.314 (2018)
- Nampulwangulenfe / Mapunauta (2018), in collaboration with Nicole L'Huillier
- Llekumun (2021)
- La escritura del rio (2021)

== Awards and recognition ==
- Pablo Neruda Foundation scholarship (2011)
- Beca Creacion Literaria, Consejo Nacional de la Cultura y las Artes (2012 and 2016)
- Premio Jovenes Talentos, Fundacion Mustakis and Balmaceda Arte Joven (2014)
- Premio Municipal de Literatura de Santiago, poetry category, for Guerra florida (2019)
- Premio Mejores Obras Literarias Publicadas, short story category, for Pinen (2020)
- First place, AX: Encuentro de las Culturas Indigenas y Afrodescendientes, for Llekumun (2020)
- Premio Municipal de Literatura de Santiago, novel category, for Chilco (2024)
- Anna Seghers Prize (2026)
