= Félix Bruzzone =

Argentinian writer (born 1976)

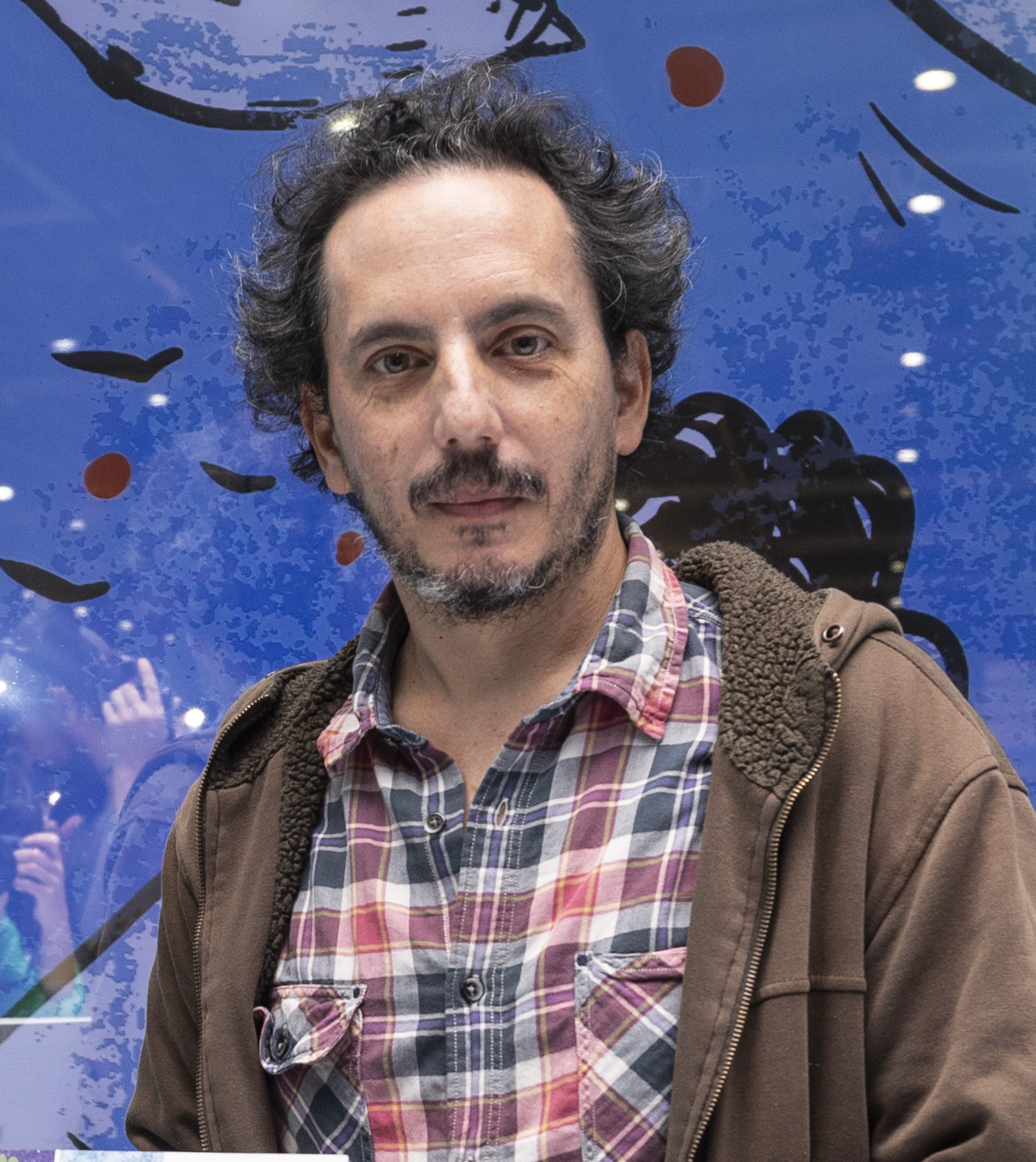
Félix Bruzzone at the presentation of the 40 years of Democracy collection

Félix Bruzzone (born 1976 in Buenos Aires) is an Argentinian writer.

== Life and work ==
Bruzzone studied literature at the University of Buenos Aires. He was named one of the ten most important authors of the decade by Clarín, the largest newspaper in Argentina. His books deal with the Argentine military dictatorship of the 1970s and 1980s and the victims of this era. Bruzzone's parents were among those, the so-called "disappeared", his father having been arrested three months before his birth, and his mother abducted a few months later. Their further fate remains unresolved. Bruzzone grew up in the care of his grandmother.

== Selected works ==
=== Novels ===
- Los Topos (Buenos Aires: Mondadori/Random House, 2008).
- Barrefondo (Buenos Aires: Mondadori/Random House, 2010).
- Las Chanchas (Buenos Aires: Mondadori/Random House, 2014).

=== Short stories ===
- 76 (Buenos Aires: Tamarisco, 2007; Buenos Aires: Momofuku, 2013).

=== Non-fiction ===
- Piletas (Buenos Aires: Excursiones, 2017). Illustrated by Juan Astica.

=== Children's literature ===
- Julian en el Espejo (Madrid: Pípala/Adriana Hidalgo, 2015). Illustrated by Pablo Derka.
- Julian y el Caballo de Piedra (Madrid: Pipala/Adriana Hidalgo, 2016). Illustrated by Germán Wendel.

=== Works in translation ===
- Unimog. In: Timo Berger und Rike Bolte (Hrsg.): Asado Verbal. Junge argentinische Literatur. Verlag Klaus Wagenbach, Berlin 2010.
- 76. Berenberg Verlag, Berlin 2010.

== Awards ==
- 2010 Anna Seghers-Preis, awarded with Andreas Schäfer
