= Fever Dream (Schweblin novel) =

Psychological fiction novel

- First edition
- Author: Samanta Schweblin
- Original title: Distancia de rescate
- Translator: Megan McDowell
- Language: Spanish
- Genre: Horror Fiction, Psychological Fiction
- Publisher: Riverhead Books
- Publication date: 2014
- Publication place: Argentina
- English publication date: 2017
- Media type: Paperback
- Pages: 183
- ISBN: 978-0-399-18460-4

Fever Dream (Spanish: Distancia de rescate, lit. 'rescue distance') is a 2014 novel by Samanta Schweblin. An English translation by Megan McDowell was published in 2017 through Riverhead Books. The novel has elements of psychological fiction and takes inspiration from the environmental problems in Argentina.

== Main characters ==
=== Amanda ===
Amanda is the mother of Nina. She is protective and very concerned with her daughter's welfare, constantly calculating a "rescue distance". She lives with her husband and daughter in the capital and came to the country with Nina for a vacation. She does not know why she is in a clinic.

=== David ===
David is the son of Carla and Omar. He drank poisoned water when he was three years old and nearly died, but was saved by the woman in the green house through the process of transmigration. After recovering from his poisoning, David does not act like he used to. He no longer refers to Carla as "Mom".

=== Carla ===
Carla is the mother of David, wife of Omar. She was an accountant for a local farm. After the incident with David, she begins to describe him as a monster. She becomes a friend to Amanda and warns her to stay away from David.

=== Nina ===
Nina is Amanda's daughter. She eventually becomes poisoned like the other children.

=== Omar ===
Omar is the husband of Carla and father of David. He was once a successful racehorse breeder but lost his best horses after they were poisoned by the stream.

=== Woman in the Green House ===
She is a local woman known for her healing abilities. She uses supernatural powers to keep the poisoned kids alive. She healed both David and Nina after they were poisoned.

== Cultural background ==
Schweblin drew inspiration for her novel from the use of harmful pesticides in farming towns throughout Argentina, which she stated causes multiple issues. Schweblin states that Argentina is a major producer of soybeans, a product related with pesticides. It is also one of the world's top producers of genetically engineered crops, mainly soybeans designed to resist pesticides. This allows for excess spraying of herbicides with no negative effects to the crops. Pesticides can have several effects on the members of farming towns in Argentina, including birth defects and other health issues. This is illustrated in the novel as many children in the town have birth defects. Pesticides, along with other agricultural runoff, can drain into water sources causing contamination. There are many communities without running water, and their water sources are contaminated by agricultural runoff containing pesticides. In some cases, old pesticide containers are even used to collect rainwater. This is seen within the novel as several characters are poisoned through local water sources.

== Reception ==
=== Critical response ===
NPR praises the novel for its use of horror in highlighting the use of toxic agricultural chemicals calling it "an exceptional example of the short-and-creepy form". An article from The New Yorker says that the book is "so enigmatic and so disciplined...[that] it belongs to a new literary genre altogether".

=== Accolades ===
- Tigre Juan Literary Award (2015)
- Man Booker International Prize Shortlist (2017)
- The Morning News Tournament of Books Winner (2018)
- Shirley Jackson Award for best novella (2017)

== See also ==
- Fever Dream (film), a 2021 adaptation
- Pesticide
- Pesticide poisoning
