= Elizabeth Gonzalez James =

American novelist and essayist

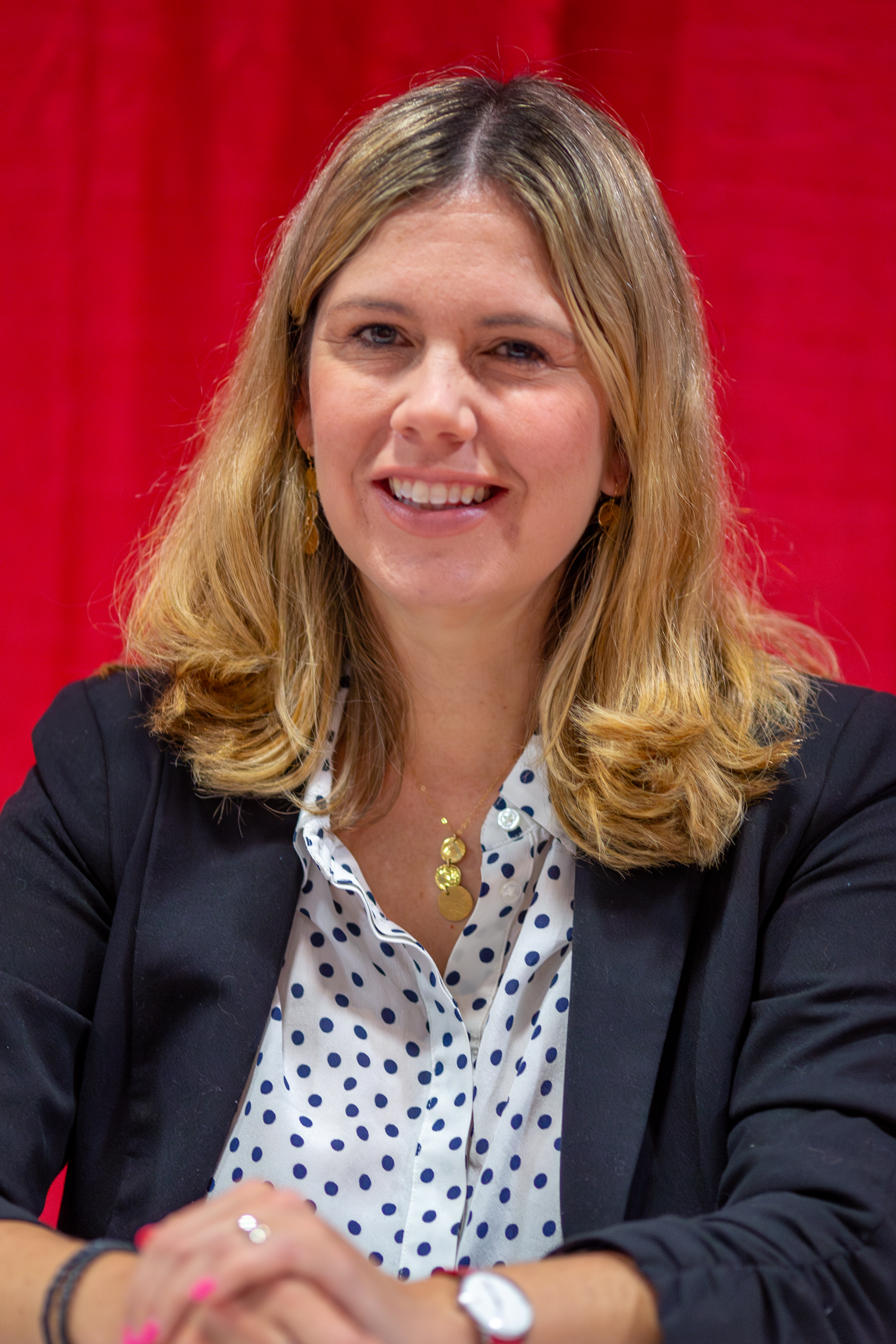
- Born: South Texas, U.S.
- Education: Syracuse University
- Occupations: Novelist; essayist; screenwriter
- Writing career
- Genres: Literary fiction; magical realism; Western fiction
- Notable works: Mona at Sea; The Bullet Swallower
- Website: elizabethgonzalezjames.com

Elizabeth Gonzalez James is an American novelist, essayist, and screenwriter. She is best known for her novels Mona at Sea (2021) and The Bullet Swallower (2024); the latter was named a best book of 2024 by NPR and Esquire and received an honor citation in the Texas Institute of Letters's Jesse H. Jones Award for Best Book of Fiction. Her fiction and essays frequently return to the landscape of South Texas and to questions of inherited history and identity. James is a former interviews editor at The Rumpus.

== Early life and education ==
James was born and raised in South Texas, a region that recurs throughout her fiction. She studied art history at Syracuse University and went on to earn an MBA, graduating in the winter of 2008 just as the financial crisis closed off the corporate-finance career she had planned to enter. Before establishing herself as a writer, she worked as a waitress, a pollster, an Avon representative, and an opera singer. She is an alumna of the Bread Loaf Writers' Conference, the Tin House Writers Workshop, and Lit Camp.

== Career ==
=== Mona at Sea (2021) ===
James's debut novel, Mona at Sea, was published in June 2021 by the Santa Fe Writers Project. The manuscript had been a finalist in the 2019 SFWP Literary Awards, judged by Carmen Maria Machado. Set against the Great Recession, the novel follows a millennial finance graduate whose entry into the workforce is derailed by the 2008 financial crisis. The Star Tribune called it a "hilarious debut," while the Washington Independent Review of Books gave it a more mixed notice, praising its "clean prose and dark wit" but finding some of its satire underdeveloped.

=== Short fiction and essays ===
James's short stories and essays have appeared in The Idaho Review, Southern Humanities Review, The Rumpus, StorySouth, and PANK, among other journals. Her story "Cosmic Blues" was a finalist for Glimmer Train's 2016 Short Story Award for New Writers, and her short fiction and essays have received multiple Pushcart Prize and Best of the Net nominations.

In March 2023, Texas Review Press (an imprint of Texas A&M University Press) published her chapbook Five Conversations About Peter Sellers, a hybrid play and essay. Framed as an inquiry into Peter Sellers's role in derailing production of the 1967 spy spoof Casino Royale, the book splits into five narrators as it becomes a broader exploration of the author's own identity as a biethnic woman.

=== The Bullet Swallower (2024) ===
In 2024, Simon & Schuster published James's second novel, The Bullet Swallower, a magical realist Western that moves between dual timelines in 1895 and 1964 and was loosely inspired by the life of her own great-grandfather. The novel explores generational trauma and the legacies of colonialism along the Texas–Mexico border.

The book received starred reviews from Kirkus Reviews, Library Journal, BookPage, and Shelf Awareness, and was reviewed in the Los Angeles Times, The Boston Globe, and Esquire. It was named a best book of 2024 by NPR and Esquire, selected as a Book of the Month Club pick for January 2024 and an Indie Next Pick for February 2024, and featured on The Tonight Show Starring Jimmy Fallon as one of sixteen books in the program's spring 2024 book club selection. James also appeared in the MSNBC documentary My Generation, representing the millennial generation.

The Bullet Swallower was an honor winner of the Jesse H. Jones Award for Best Book of Fiction from the Texas Institute of Letters in 2025, was longlisted for the Massachusetts Book Award, and was shortlisted for the Reading the West Award. The novel was also a featured title at the Library of Congress's 2024 National Book Festival.

=== Teaching, editing, and public speaking ===
James has taught fiction writing at GrubStreet in Boston, the Pioneer Valley Writers Workshop, and StoryStudio. She was formerly a columnist for the Ploughshares Blog. From 2021-2023 she was interviews editor at The Rumpus, where her subjects included George Saunders, Silvia Moreno-Garcia, and Tom Perrotta. She frequently appears as a speaker and panelist at literary festivals and universities, including the Boston Book Festival and Harper College.

== Personal life ==
James is originally from South Texas and lives in Massachusetts with her family.

== Bibliography ==
=== Novels ===
- Mona at Sea (Santa Fe Writers Project, 2021)
- The Bullet Swallower (Simon & Schuster, 2024)

=== Chapbooks ===
- Five Conversations About Peter Sellers (Texas Review Press, 2023)

== Awards and honors ==
- 2016: Finalist, Glimmer Train Short Story Award for New Writers, for "Cosmic Blues"
- 2019: Finalist, SFWP Literary Awards, for Mona at Sea
- 2024: Best Book of the Year, NPR and Esquire, for The Bullet Swallower
- 2025: Honor winner, Jesse H. Jones Award for Best Book of Fiction, Texas Institute of Letters, for The Bullet Swallower
