= Things We Lost in the Fire (story collection) =

Short story collection by Mariana Enriquez

- First edition
- Author: Mariana Enriquez
- Original title: Las cosas que perdimos en el fuego
- Translator: Megan McDowell
- Language: Spanish
- Genre: Short Stories
- Publisher: Anagrama
- Publication date: 2016
- Publication place: Argentina
- English publication date: 2017
- Media type: Hardcover
- Pages: 208
- ISBN: 978-0451495112

Things We Lost in the Fire: Stories (Spanish: Las cosas que perdimos en el fuego) is a short story collection by Mariana Enriquez, published in 2016 by the Editorial Anagrama. Originally published in Spanish, it was translated into English by Megan McDowell in 2017. The work has 12 stories framed in the horror genre, in which Enríquez explores social issues such as depression, poverty, eating disorders, inequality and gender violence. The name of the work is taken from the album Things We Lost in the Fire, released in 2001 by the American band Low, of which Enríquez is a fan.

"The Intoxicated Years" was published in Granta. "Spiderweb" appeared in The New Yorker.

== Contents ==
Story	Description
"The Dirty Kid"	A woman tries to help a dirty, homeless child and is threatened by his mother. A body of a child is found, and she thinks it’s the dirty kid, but it’s not. When she confronts the mother, the mother says she sacrificed the child.
"The Inn"	Two female friends break into an inn that used to be a police academy (as revenge on the owner of the inn, who fired one of the girls’ fathers). They see and hear sounds like vehicles, running and headlights, but no one else can hear the noises.
"The Intoxicated Years"	Some teenage girls in 1989–94 rebel against their parents with drinking, drugs and older boyfriends. They see a strange girl get off a bus at night in the middle of a large park, but are unable to find her. While on acid, they accidentally kill one of the girls’ boyfriends.
"Adela's House"	A girl’s brother and friend become obsessed with an abandoned house. When the three of them break in, it seems to be bigger and have more rooms on the inside than it should. The friend enters a room and disappears forever. The police don’t believe then and tell them that the house has no rooms inside; the narrator’s brother kills himself out of guilt.
"An Invocation of the Big-Eared Runt"	A man who leads a murder tour of Buenos Aires starts seeing visions of the Big-Eared Runt, a murderer of children (even though he died many years ago). Meanwhile, his wife, who has recently had a baby, is unhappy and thinks he is obsessed with the Runt. The story ends with him seeing his sleeping wife and child and pulling a nail out of a wall (paralleling the Runt driving a nail into one of his victim’s skulls).
"Spiderweb"	A woman goes on a trip with her obnoxious husband Juan Martín and her cousin Natalia. Their car breaks down, and they have to spend the night at a hotel, where Juan Martín mysteriously disappears.
"End of Term"	A girl’s classmate, Marcela, starts self-harming and when asked, says it’s because of a man she’s having visions of. Marcela stops coming to school, but the narrator tracks her down, saying “I want to know what he makes you do.” She starts self-harming as well.
"No Flesh Over Our Bones"	A woman finds a skull on the street and takes it home, naming it Vera. Her boyfriend thinks this is weird, so she tells him to move out. She becomes obsessed with the skull and stops eating, but when her mother comes to visit (her boyfriend had contacted her), she lies and pretends everything is fine. She resolves to obtain additional bones to complete Vera’s skeleton.
"The Neighbor's Courtyard"	Paula moves into a new house and starts hearing strange sounds and sees a chained up boy in the neighbor’s courtyard, but her partner Miguel thinks that she is crazy and hallucinating because of her job as a social worker (and her depression since being fired). She breaks into the neighbour’s house, but can’t find anyone. The boy appears in her bedroom and eats her cat alive, then shows he has her front door keys; she tries to run away, but can’t.
"Under the Black Water"	A district attorney investigates police officers who threw two teenagers into a polluted river; one of their bodies was found but the other never turned up. She is told that the other boy, Emanuel, is alive in the Moreno Bridge slum, and goes to visit. There, she finds deformed children (linked to the polluted river) and finds that they are worshiping Emanuel. A priest shoots himself in front of her, and after she sees a parade (where they are carrying Emanuel’s body, though she never sees it), she runs away.
"Green Red Orange"	The narrator’s friend, Marco, locks himself in his room permanently (his mother leaves him food). The narrator speaks to him through the internet. Marco talks about dark things that can be found on the deep web, and is online less and less, asking how she can tell him apart from a program imitating him.
"Things We Lost in the Fire"	A femicide epidemic of men setting women on fire leads to a movement of the Burning Women where women deliberately set themselves on fire (with the aim of disfiguring themselves, not killing themselves). The authorities try to crack down on the movement, and the narrator has doubts about whether she should betray the organisation, but ends up helping them (including filming one of the burnings).

== Literary significance and reception ==
Reviews of the collection highlighted Enriquez's dark and haunting style. A review in The Guardian called the collection "gruesome, violent, upsetting – and bright with brilliance." Jennifer Szalai, writing in The New York Times, wrote "[Enriquez] is after a truth more profound, and more disturbing, than whatever the strict dictates of realism will allow."

In a review in Vanity Fair, Sloane Crosley was impressed by Enriquez's skill at using supernatural stories to explore Argentina's political turmoil: "In her hands, the country’s inequality, beauty, and corruption tangle together to become a manifestation of our own darkest thoughts and fears."
