= Karen Lamassonne =

Colombian American artist (born 1954)

- Born: 1954 (age 71–72); New York, United States
- Children: 1
- Website: https://www.karenlamassonne.com/

Karen Lamassonne (born 1954, in New York) is a Colombian American artist. Throughout her career Lamassonne has explored a plethora of disciplines such as film, printmaking, painting, graphic design, video art, and music. Lamassonne's work is notable for reflecting this combination of several different studies, most noticeably that of her paintings having a very cinematic vision behind them. Noteworthy works of Lamassonne's all contain this sense of multifaceted technical skills put into them. A majority of Lamassonne's work contains motifs of sensuality from a woman's perspective, specifically she includes sexuality from her own perspectives and experiences. Moreover, her signature combination of feminine-led sexuality and a frank expression of true life have led to both Lamassonne and her work being the subject of criticism via censorship.

== Early life and education ==
Lamassonne was born in 1954 in New York to an Argentine father and Colombian mother. Her childhood was split between New York and Bogota, with Lamassonne residing in Colombia for the majority of the beginning of her artistic career. Lamassonne studied the arts throughout grade school. Towards the end of the 1960s, while in high school in California, Lamassonne began to study under the artist Charles Garoian. Specifically, she took some night classes Foothill College (1971) at Los Altos, California at which she focused her studies on printmaking and painting. Later on, in 1973, Lamassonne decided to further her study of paintings by studying under the artist David Manzur in Bogotá.

== Notable works ==
=== Baños (1979–1980) ===
A series of watercolors which began in 1979, when Lamassonne left Europe to return to Bogota. Baños is a notable series as it established Lamassonne's reputation as an artist who did not follow the typical rules assigned to her gender, since she chooses to explicitly depict her sexuality and moments of intimacy as a feminine being. Furthermore, this series gained notoriety due to the censorship it received when it was displayed at an executive's gallery; during a meeting at the Galería del Club de Ejecutivos, one of the executives stopped a lecture and stated that "it was impossible to continue ‘if those obscenities’ (the paintings) were not taken down".

=== Pura Sangre (1982) ===
This film project served as Lamassonne's film and video debut, specifically working as a production designer alongside María Cano. Pura Sangre is a notable piece of work for Lamassonne as it not only heavily injected with her visual identity, but it also served as one of the pioneering works for the "Caliwood" film movement as led by Luis Ospina, the director of Pura Sangre.

=== Secretos Delicados (1982) ===
One of Lamassonne's first personal video projects that she both produced and directed. This short features music from artists that Lamassonne listened to throughout her youth, such as Marvin Gaye and The Rolling Stones. "Secretos Delicados" shows a series of clips that all relate back to Lamassonne's signature explicit expression of her sexuality, in this case it is showcased in its relation to Cali, Colombia.

=== Ruido (1984) ===
Another one of Lamassonne's more well-known personal video endeavors, which also delves into Lamassonne's signature sexuality. This short also focuses on Lamassonne's sexuality in her youth, however it exchanges its Colombia setting for a more New York ambience; the city elements come through via her inclusion of very domestic images. This video is part of an installation that the artist was finally able to create in her Survey show RUIDO/NOISE at the Swiss Institute Contemporary Art New York, in September 2022. The show will travel to KW Institute for Contemporary Art in February 2023 and then travel to the Museo de Arte Moderno de Medellín MAMM in July 2023.

== Exhibitions ==
=== Solo exhibitions ===
- Dibujos (1974); Bogotá, Colombia.
- Eróticos (1975); Galería Exposur in Cali, Colombia
- Acuarelas (1976); Galería Punta de Lanza in Bogotá, Colombia
- Baños (1979); Galería Club de Ejecutivos in Cali, Colombia
- Baños (1980); Galería Finale in Medellín, Colombia
- Baños (1980); Galería Belarca in Bogotá, Colombia
- Pinturas (1989); Galería Belarca in Bogotá, Colombia
- Pinturas (1989); La Tertulia Museum in Cali, Colombia
- Pegados Mortales (1991); Galería Arte Moderno in Cali, Colombia
- Encuentros Rehechos (1993); Galería Belarca in Bogotá, Colombia
- Encuentros Rehechos (1993); Galería de la Oficina in Medellin, Colombia
- Desnuda Astucia del Deseo (2017); La Tertulia Museum in Cali, Colombia
- Karen Lamassonne (2019); Museo Rayo in Roldanillo, Colombia
- La Mujer de Cincuenta Pies (2019); Facultad de Artes ASAB in Bogotá, Colombia
- Correspondencia 2020 (2020); GER-ART Gallery in Atlanta, Georgia, USA
- Ruido/Noise (2022); Swiss Institute Contemporary Art New York in New York, New York, USA
- Ruido/Noise (2023); KW Institute for Contemporary Art in Berlin, Germany

=== Group exhibitions ===
- Salon de Arte Joven (1977); Museo de Arte Moderno La Tertulia La Tertulia Museum in Cali, Colombia
- Acuarelas (1977); Galería Pirámide in Bogotá, Colombia
- Miniaturas (1977); Galería Casanegra in Bogotá, Colombia
- Festival Internacional de la Peinture (1980); in Cagnes-sur-Mer, France
- Colombian Figurative (1990); Moss Gallery in San Francisco, California, USA
- Latin American Artists (1990); CSS in Atlanta, Georgia, USA
- Dissimilar Identity - Latin American New York (1991); Scott Alan Gallery in New York, New York, USA
- Artesia Gallery (1992); Palazzo d’elle Esposizione in Rome, Italy
- Artesia Gallery (1994); Palazzo d’elle Esposizione in Rome, Italy
- VOCES ÍNTIMAS - Relatos e imágenes de mujeres artistas (2016); Museo Nacional, Colombian National Museum in Bogotá
- MUJERES RADICALES: Arte Latinoamericano, 1960-1985 (2017); Hammer Museum in Los Angeles, California, USA
- MUJERES RADICALES: Arte Latinoamericano, 1960-1985 (2018); Brooklyn Museum in Brooklyn, New York, USA
- MUJERES RADICALES: Arte Latinoamericano, 1960-1985 (2018); Pinacoteca do Estado de São Paulo in São Paulo, Brazil
- AMAZONAS (2018); Galería Lamazone in Bogotá, Colombia
- EL ARTE DE LA DESOBEDIENCIA (The Art of Disobedience) 2018; Museo de Arte Moderno https://www.mambogota.com/ in Bogotá, Colombia
- LAS POPULARES GRÁFICAS MOLINARI: Versión, subversión y perversión de las imágenes 2018; La Tertulia Museum in Cali, Colombia
- Actos en Silencio (2019); Galería Liberia in Bogotá, Colombia
- El Deseo Aparece de Repente (Desire Appears Suddenly) (2021); Instituto de Visión At institutodevision.com in Bogotá, Colombia

== Collections ==
=== Public collections ===
- Museo de Arte del Banco de la República in Bogotá, Colombia
- Biblioteca Luis Angel Arango Luis Ángel Arango Library in Bogotá, Colombia
- Museo de Arte Moderno Bogotá Museum of Modern Art in Bogotá, Colombia
- Museo de Arte Moderno La Tertulia La Tertulia Museum in Cali, Colombia
- Museo Rayo in Roldanillo, Colombia
- Museo de Arte Moderno de Medellín MAMM in Medellín, Colombia
- The Kadist Collection

== Film ==
- EL ULTIMO CLIENTE (1979); Art Director for the short film directed by Miguel Torres, produced by Lina Uribe, Bogotá Colombia
- PURA SANGRE (1982); Art Direction, Assistant to the Director, Assistant Editor and Storyboard, Directed by Luis Ospina; Cali, Colombia
- CARNE DE TU CARNE (1983); Editor and Actor, directed by Carlos Mayolo, produced by FOCINE, Cali, Colombia
- KALT IN KOLUMBIEN (1984); Art Director and Actor, directed by Dieter Schidor, produced by Planet-Film, Cartagena, Colombia * * * AQUEL 19 (1985); Assistant Editor for the short film by Carlos Mayolo, produced by FOCINE, Cali, Colombia
- ATRAPADOS (1985); Editor for the short, directed by Juan José Bejarano, produced by FOCINE, Bogotá, Colombia
- MOMENTOS DE UN DOMINGO (1985); Assistant Editor for the short film directed by Patricia Restrepo, produced by FOCINE, Bogotá, Colombia
- EN BUSCA DE MARIA (1985); Art Director and Assistant Editor for the documentary short, directed by Luis Ospina and Jorge Nieto, produced by the Patrimonio Fílmico Nacional, Bogotá, Colombia
- CALI CALIDOSCOPIO (1985); Assistant Editor for the short film directed by Carlos Mayolo, produced by FOCINE, Cali, Colombia
- LA MANSIÓN DE ARAUCAIMA (1986); Editor for the feature film directed by Carlos Mayolo, produced by FOCINE, Cali, Colombia
- ANDRÉS CAICEDO: UNOS POCOS BUENOS AMIGOS (1986); Art Director of the documentary directed by Luis Ospina Cali, Colombia
- VALERIA (1986); Art Director, Actor and Editor for the short film directed by Oscar Campo, produced by FOCINE,
- ELLA EL CHULO Y EL ATARVAN (1986) Art Director for the short film directed by Fernando Velez, produced by FOCINE, Cali, Colombia
- REPUTADO (1986); Art Director for the short film directed by Silvia Amaya, produced by FOCINE, Bogotá, Colombia
- GREEN COBRA (1987); Location Manager in Cali for the feature film, directed by Werner Herzog, Cali, Colombia
- LAS ANDANZAS DE JUAN MAXIMO GRIS (1987) Editor for the short film directed by Oscar Campo, produced by FOCINE, Cali, Colombia
- MARIA CANO (1988); Art Director for the feature film directed by Camila Loboguerrero, produced by the Government Film Office of Colombia FOCINE, Bogotá, Colombia
- ADIOS A CALI(1990); Testimony in the documentary by Luis Ospina, Cali Colombia
- PRAY FOR US (1993); Art Director and Actor for the short film directed by Gustavo A. González, produced by the ENAIP, Rome, Italy
- TIGRE DE PAPEL (Paper Tiger) 2007; Associate Producer in Atlanta in the Feature Documentary directed by Luis Ospina, Colombia
- TODO COMENZÓ POR EL FIN (It All Started at The End) 2015; Actor in the Feature Documentary directed by Luis Ospina, Colombia

== Honors and awards ==
- Best Editing Award for La Mansion de Araucaima (1986); Festival de Cine de Bogotá (shared with Luis Ospina)
