= La Mansión de Araucaima =

1986 film

- Theatrical release poster
- Directed by: Carlos Mayolo
- Written by: Carlos Mayolo; Alvaro Mutis
- Based on: La Mansión de Araucaima by Álvaro Mutis
- Produced by: Carlos Mayolo; Luis Ospina
- Starring: Adriana Herrán; Vicky Hernández; José Lewgoy; Antonio Pitanga; Luis F. Montoya; Carlos Mayolo; Alejandro Buenaventura
- Cinematography: Ricardo Lalinde
- Edited by: Karen Lamassonne; Luis Ospina
- Music by: German Arrieta; Carlos Gomez
- Distributed by: FOCINE
- Release date: 25 December 1986
- Running time: 85 minutes
- Country: Colombia
- Language: Spanish

La mansión de Araucaima (English: The Manor of Araucaima) is a 1986 Colombian drama film directed and co-written by Carlos Mayolo. Its genre has been described as "Tropical Gothic." It is based on the tale of the same name by Alvaro Mutis.

== Plot ==
Angela, a young model, is working on a TV commercial that is filmed in the countryside. Her boyfriend is part of the crew behind the camera. Not far from where they are shooting the commercial, there is a house named Araucaima, inhabited by six eccentric characters: Paul, a guardian, who patrols the property with his German Shepherd; Camilo, an impotent alcoholic pilot; a monk, with a passion for books; a black servant named Cristobal who does the daily chores; the Machiche, a mature, voluptuous woman who keeps the men in the house under her control; and Graciliano "Don Graci", the pampered and corrupt owner of the house.

The inhabitants of Araucaima, having arrived there by serendipity, live in apparent harmony. Camilo and the monk run the accounting of the property; Cristobal sells the production of the farm in the nearby town and buys provisions; the guardian watches the property; Don Graciliano takes long baths outdoors, and Machiche has sex with Cristobal and the guardian, who hate each other.

On the second day of filming the commercial, Angela has a tantrum and runs away on her bicycle. She arrives at the mansion of Araucaima and asks permission to use the bathroom. The guardian lets her in. Angela is befriended by Camilo who talks to Don Graciano. He invites Angela for dinner as the chain of her bicycle is broken and is already late. Angela stays not only for the night. There is not tracking of time and comfortable around the house, Angela soon becomes one more of its members.

Angela soon realizes that her interest in Camilo is pointless, since the pilot is impotent. The monk is not, and inviting Angela to his room, they soon begin to have sex. Don Graci finds out and orders Cristobal to approach her while dealing with the monk. On a rainy day while bathing on a river, Angela is joined by Cristobal and they have sex. Machiche is jealous, as Cristobal was her favorite lover and confronts him, but he tells her that she has been doing the same as Machiche is also the guardian’s lover. Don Graci realizes that Angela has broken the harmony they all previously enjoyed and wants Angela to leave the house. The monk agrees, but Machiches persuades them to let Angela stay. She has her own plan for Angela. From then on, Machiche befriends Angela, they share more time together and join Don Graci on his long baths outdoors. Machiche performs for Angela a theatrical scene and the two women begin a lesbian affair. Soon, however, Machiche gets tired of Angela. Machiche really likes only men and tells Angela that Cristobal slept with her by orders of Don Graci. Angela breaks into tears and runs looking for solace with Camilo and the monk, but they ignore her. Going to the warehouse, Angela sees her bike. The next morning, the guardian finds Angela's body in the warehouse. She has committed suicide by hanging herself.

Angela's death infuriates Camilo, the pilot, who knows that Machiche is directly responsible for Angelas's suicide. Camilo takes the monk's revolver and kills Machiche. Despairing, Cristobal jumps behind Camilo and strangles him with a shovel. Now there are three dead bodies. Angry, Don Graci gives orders to bury Camilo and Machiche and cremate Angela's body in the oven. The next day the survivors of the house abandon it. Don Graci gives Cristobal his freedom. The four men leave the property. Sometime later, Angela's boyfriend arrives to the abandoned house calling out her name. He reads the four rules at the entrance of the mansion of Araucaima: If you enter this house, do not leave. If you leave this house, do not go back. If you pass by this house, do not look. If you dwell in this house, do not plant prayers.

== Cast ==
- Vicky Hernández as la Machiche
- Adriana Herrán as Angela, the model
- José Lewgoy as Don Graciliano 'Don Graci', the owner
- Antonio Pitanga as Cristóbal, the servant
- Luis Fernando Montoya as Camilo, the pilot
- Carlos Mayolo as Paul, the Guardian
- Alejandro Buenaventura as the monk
- David Guerrero as Angela's boyfriend
- Luis Ospina as Commercial's director
- Helios Fernández as the groceries merchant

== Production ==
'La Mansión de Araucaima' is a story written by Álvaro Mutis published in 1973, as part of a bet with his friend the director Luis Buñuel in which the latter dismissed the possibility of capturing the Gothic genre in the Latin American tropics. Mutis' intention was for Buñuel to film the story, but the project did not materialize.

Years later, the Cinematic Development Company (FOCINE) handed the project over to Carlos Mayolo after his success with his film Carne de tu carne, and together with his friend and colleague Luis Ospina, they adapted the story giving it the characteristic essence of Buñuel; the confrontation between the real world and one of fantasy, the confinement as a metaphor for class and sex as the motor of the actions of the characters.

Mayolo hired Vicky Hernández, Adriana Herrán and David Guerrero, with whom he had worked in Carne de tu carne, adding Luis Fernando Montoya and Alejandro Buenaventura, two renowned Colombian actors. And finally he hired José Lewgoy and Antonio Sampaio, two renowned Brazilian actors. Frank Ramírez was considered for the role of Guardian Paul but turned it down because he was not starring.

=== Filming ===
It was filmed at the San Julian farm, close to Santander de Quilichao, a completely abandoned farm where all the furniture and other elements necessary for the filming of the film were brought.

A Brazilian actress had been thought of for the role of 'La Machiche' but the chosen one could not travel to Colombia so Vicky Hernández was chosen, who although she was far from the description of the character in the story, was chosen for her talent after a screen test.

== DVD release ==
La Mansión de Araucaima is available in Region 4 DVD, it can also play in region 1. Audio in Spanish, but no English subtitles. Only have Spanish subtitles in Señal Colombia broadcast.
