= Caninos =

2017 short story by Mónica Ojeda

- Author: Mónica Ojeda
- Language: Spanish
- Genre: Short story
- Publisher: Editorial Turbina
- Publication date: 2017
- Publication place: Ecuador

Caninos (in English, "Canines") is a short story by Ecuadorian writer Mónica Ojeda, first published in 2017 by Editorial Turbina. It was later included as part of her book of short stories Las voladoras (2020). The plot follows a family with a dark secret: the father undergoes a transformation that begins with him losing his teeth and then gradually acquiring canine features. The characters in the story do not have given names; rather, they are identified as Hija, (Note: English: Daughter) Papi, (Note: English: Dad) Mami, (Note: English: Mom) and Ñaña. (Note: English: A Quechua word meaning "sister")

Among the themes explored in the story are sexual perversion, child abuse, and incest.

The story was well received by critics and has been praised by figures such as Sara Mesa, Michelle Roche Rodríguez, and Daniela Alcívar Bellolio, among others.

== Plot ==
Hija was a young woman who lived with her dog Godzilla and who kept Papi's dentures under her pillow. Papi had died some time ago as a result of a terminal illness that had bedridden him and caused him to lose his teeth, which had led Hija to get him the dentures that she now kept. Hija had begun taking care of Papi after Mami told her that she and Ñaña could no longer do so, because Ñaña was tosca (Note: English: Rough) and was beginning to overdo it, evidenced by the cigarette burn marks on Papi's body and other traces of abuse. Godzilla had come to her much earlier. One day, she had found him roaming the streets and the dog had bit her leg. Although she didn't fully understand it, Godzilla's bite had awakened childhood memories in Hija that she didn't know she had, several of them related to her parents' chronic alcoholism, as well as the strange feeling that it wasn't the first time she had been bitten.

Before long, Papi got used to his dentures and Hija started taking him out for walks on his leash along with Godzilla, which made Papi stick his tongue out and pant with joy. But Papi's happiness awakened even more memories in Hija, including blurry images of sex games her parents engaged in when they were drunk. Sometimes, she remembered her father on all fours, on a leash, while her mother threw food on the floor for him or punished him for peeing on the sofa. She also remembered Papi apologizing to her and Ñaña before he started barking at them, and then the moment when Mami let him out of his leash. Both running in terror through the house, knowing that one of them would be left behind. Then came the bite. But Hija's memories were never quite clear.

== Writing and publishing ==
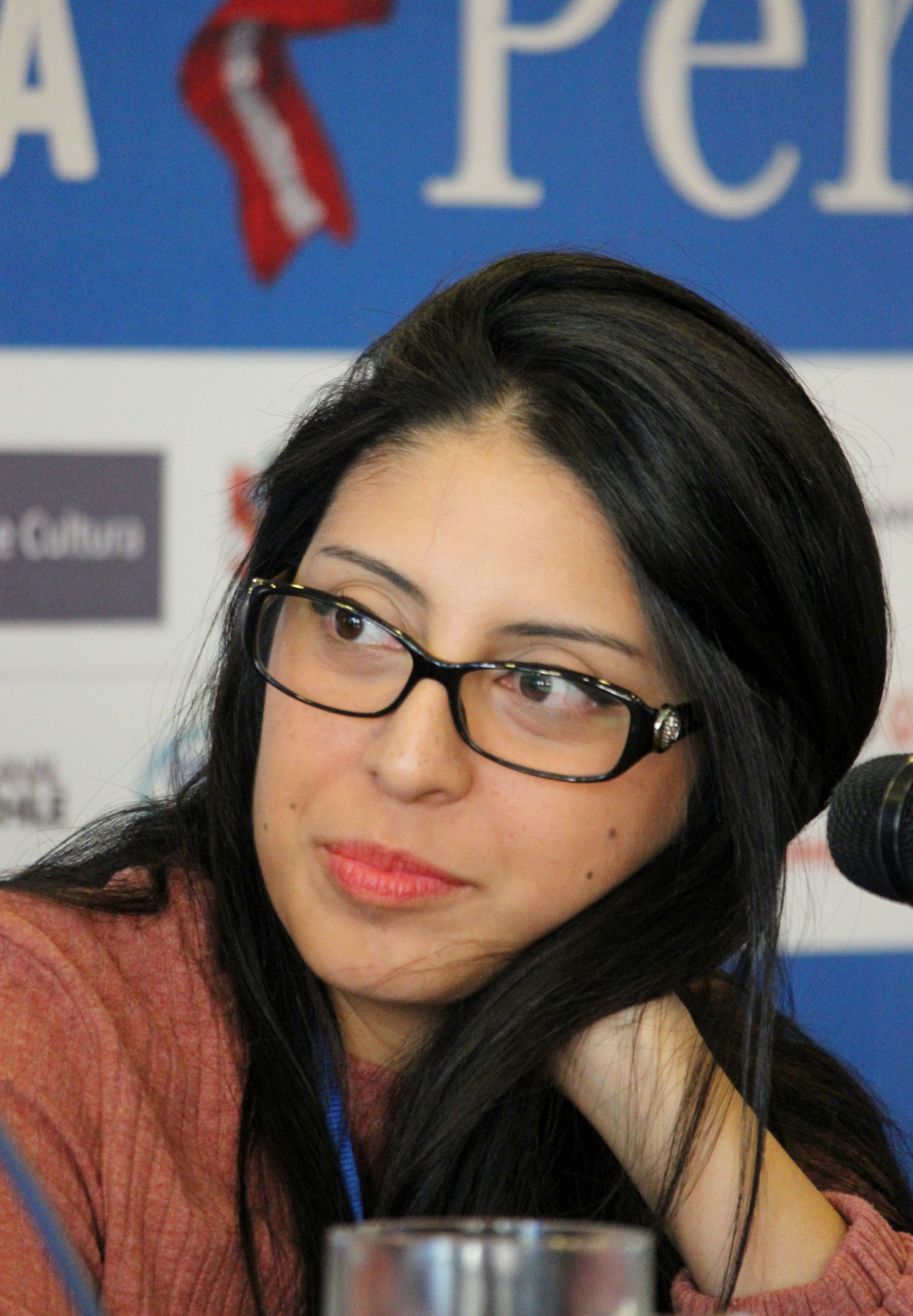
Mónica Ojeda in 2018

According to Ojeda, the story was born out of the idea of a woman who kept her deceased father's dentures under her pillow and the strange relationship between the two. From that image, she started to put together the rest of the plot, which incorporated the analogy between father, dog, and teeth after introducing the character of Godzilla, the protagonist's pet. Ojeda wrote the story alongside her novel Jawbone (2018) and her poetry book Historia de la leche (2019), works with which it shares some themes and symbols. The writing of Caninos also served as the creative trigger that led Ojeda to later write Las voladoras (2020).

Caninos was published individually in 2017 by Ecuadorian independent publishing house Turbina. Months later, it appeared as part of the Bogotá39 2017 anthology under the title La dentadura de Papi. After realizing that the story fit with the themes of the collection, in 2020 Ojeda decided to include it in the book of short stories Las voladoras.

== Reception ==
The story had a good critical reception and was particularly praised in several reviews of Las voladoras. Spanish writer Sara Mesa, in a review published by newspaper El País, referred to Caninos and Slasher—another story included in the same collection—as excelentes cuentos [que] invitan a taparse los ojos con la mano. (Note: English: Excellent stories [that] make you want to cover your eyes with your hand) Ecuadorian writer and critic Daniela Alcívar Bellolio also praised the story and described it as excellent, apart from stating that it was bastante sórdido. (Note: English: Quite sordid) She also praised Ojeda's style of using short sentences and poetic language.

On his part, writer Antonio Báez said he considered Caninos to be the most outstanding story in Las voladoras and highlighted the exploration of family traumas and taboos.

== See also ==
- Las voladoras
- Mónica Ojeda
- Latin American Gothic
- Ecuadorian literature

== Bibliography ==
- Carretero Sanguino, Andrea (2019). Ars poetica horroris: poesía, violencia y sodomía en la narrativa de Mónica Ojeda (Master's degree in Latin American literature thesis) (in Spanish). Complutense University of Madrid.
- Ojeda, Mónica (2020). Las voladoras (in Spanish). Madrid: Páginas de Espuma. ISBN 9788483932827.
