= It All Started at the End =

2015 film

- Directed by: Luis Ospina
- Starring: Andrés Caicedo; Carlos Mayolo
- Release date: 13 September 2015 (TIFF)
- Running time: 3h 28min
- Country: Colombia
- Language: Spanish

It All Started at the End (Spanish: Todo comenzó por el fin) is a 2015 Colombian documentary film directed by Luis Ospina. It premiered at the Toronto International Film Festival on 13 September 2015

== Synopsis ==
In the 1970s and '80s Colombia was characterized by violence from drug cartels to guerilla warfare. During the same period director Luis Ospina and group of filmmakers, artists, and writers gathered in Cali to create an alternative vision of Colombian society.
