= Bellolio =

Bellolio is a surname. Notable people with the surname include:

- Daniela Alcívar Bellolio (born 1982), Ecuadorian author, editor, and literary critic
- Jaime Bellolio (born 1980), Chilean engineer and politician
