= Pura sangre =

Pura sangre may refer to:

- Pura sangre (film), a 1982 Colombian horror film
- Pura sangre (Venezuelan TV series), a 1994 telenovela
- Pura sangre (Colombian TV series), a 2007 telenovela

== See also ==
- De pura sangre, a 1985 Mexican telenovela
