= Gabriel Beristain =

Mexican cinematographer, producer, and director

Gabriel Beristain ASC, BSC, AMC
- Born: Luis Gabriel Beristáin; 9 May 1955 (age 71); Mexico City, Mexico
- Education: Instituto Politécnico Nacional; National Film and Television School
- Years active: 1983–present

Luis Gabriel Beristáin is a Mexican cinematographer, producer, and television director.

He is an active member of both the Academy of Motion Picture Arts and Sciences and the British Academy of Film and Television Arts.

== Early life ==
Beristain was born in Mexico City, the son of actor Luis Beristáin. His interest in filmmaking began with his involvement in Mexico's independent film scene in the seventies. He studied Engineering at the Instituto Politécnico Nacional, and later joined a new film studies program at the school, while also producing audiovisual training materials for the health department.

Beristain had a son born in 1980 who lived in Austria and died in 2000.

After filming a number of documentaries, he founded a small commercial production company, before moving to Italy in 1977. At the recommendation of director Sergio Leone, he relocated to the United Kingdom, where he enrolled in the prestigious National Film and Television School, which accepted only 25 students a year. He was one of only five foreigners to be accepted into the school, and studied cinematography under Oswald Morris and Billy Williams.

== Career ==
His first feature film as cinematographer was the 1983 Colombian horror film Bloody Flesh (Spanish: Carne de tu carne, "Flesh of Your Flesh"), for which he won the Best Cinematography Award at the Bogotá Film Festival. His work on Derek Jarman's 1986 film Caravaggio earned him a Special Silver Bear Award at the Berlin International Film Festival. Beristain was one of several cinematographers on the 1987 anthology film Aria, which was nominated for a Palme d'Or at the Cannes Film Festival. Allen Daviau suggested he move to Hollywood, where he could apply his talents and unique insight into both Mexican and Anglo cultures. Beristain has been a member of the British Society of Cinematographers since 1990, and the American Society of Cinematographers since 2002.

While working in 2003's S.W.A.T., Beristain became friends with executive producer Louis D'Esposito, who after helping form Marvel Studios invited Beristain to do additional photography for Iron Man. He wound up in the same function in six other Marvel Cinematic Universe films, and also served as cinematographer for the D'Esposito-directed Marvel One-Shot short films Item 47 (2012) and Agent Carter (2013), as well as the television series Agent Carter. Beristain would eventually have his first feature for the studio as cinematographer in 2021's Black Widow.

== Filmography ==
=== Director ===
Television

Year	Title	Notes
1996	Hidden Empire: Calling London	TV movie; Also writer
2017–2019	MacGyver	3 episodes
2010	Hawaii Five-0	Episodes "When the Light Goes Out, the House is Dark" and "A stranger only for a day"
2022	Eleven Days in Hell	Pilot episode

=== Cinematographer ===
==== Film ====
Year	Title	Director
1983	Bloody Flesh	Carlos Mayolo
1984	B'Yom Bahir Ro'im et Dameshek (Note: Also credited as writer)	Eran Riklis
1985	Christmas Present	Tony Bicât
1986	Caravaggio	Derek Jarman
1988	The Courier	Frank Deasy; Joe Lee
1988	Joyriders	Aisling Walsh
1989	Venus Peter	Ian Sellar
1989	Killing Dad	Michael Austin
1990	Waiting for the Light	Christopher Monger
1991	K2	Franc Roddam
1992	The Distinguished Gentleman	Jonathan Lynn
1993	Blood In Blood Out	Taylor Hackford
1993	Fatal Instinct	Carl Reiner
1994	Greedy	Jonathan Lynn
1995	Dolores Claiborne	Taylor Hackford
1997	Trial and Error	Jonathan Lynn
1997	The Spanish Prisoner	David Mamet
1998	Tale of the Mummy	Russell Mulcahy
1999	El cometa	José Buil; Marisa Sistach
1999	Molly	John Duigan
2002	Blade II	Guillermo del Toro
2003	S.W.A.T.	Clark Johnson
2004	Blade: Trinity	David S. Goyer
2005	The Ring Two	Hideo Nakata
2006	The Shaggy Dog	Brian Robbins
2006	The Sentinel	Clark Johnson
2007	The Invisible	David S. Goyer
2008	Street Kings	David Ayer
2009	Princess Kaiulani	Marc Forby
2010	And Soon the Darkness	Marcos Efron
2011	There Be Dragons	Roland Joffé
2021	Black Widow	Cate Shortland
2024	The Beekeeper	David Ayer
2024	Harold and the Purple Crayon	Carlos Saldanha
2025	The Gentleman	Himself
2026	Dime Detective	Betty Kaplan

Short film

Year	Title	Director	Notes
1987	Aria	Bill Bryden	Segments "Turnadot" and "I pagliacci"
2010	Ka'iulani: Crown Princess of Hawai'i	Roy Tjioe	Documentary short
2012	Item 47	Louis D'Esposito	Marvel One-Shots
2013	Agent Carter	Louis D'Esposito	Marvel One-Shots
2021	You'll Be Happy Here	Brenda Victoria Castillo	

==== Television ====
Miniseries

Year	Title	Director	Notes
1987	Lost Belongings	Tony Bicât	
1988	Troubles	Christopher Morahan	
1991	The Orchid House	Horace Ové	
2025	Washington Black	Wanuri Kahiu; Maurice Marable; Rob Seidenglanz	4 episodes

TV series

Year	Title	Director	Notes
1998	I'm Telling You for the Last Time	Marty Callner	TV special; Sequence "The Funeral"
2010	Hawaii Five-0	Len Wiseman	Episode "Pilot"
2012–2013	Magic City	Carl Franklin; Ed Bianchi; Simon Cellan Jones; Nick Gomez; Clark Johnson; David Petrarca	11 episodes
2014	The Strain	David Semel; Peter Weller	4 episodes
2015	Agent Carter		Season 1
2016–2018	MacGyver		22 episodes
2022	Monarch	Jason Ensler	Episode "Stop at Nothing"

== Awards and nominations ==
- 1984 Bogotá Film Festival Award for Best Cinematography: Bloody Flesh (Won)
- 1987 Special Silver Bear Award: Caravaggio (Won by Derek Jarman but dedicated by him to Beristain)
- 1994 VMA Award for Best Cinematography: "Amazing" (Nominated)
- 1999 Silver Ariel Award for Best Cinematography: The Comet (Nominated)
- 2021 Cinematography Award: Coronado Island Film Festival (Won)
