= Cali explosion =

1956 disaster in Cali, Colombia

- Native name: Explosión de Cali
- Date: August 7, 1956
- Time: 01:07
- Location: Cali, Colombia; 3.459791°N 76.520605°W
- Type: Accidental explosion
- Cause: Explosion of dynamite cargo
- Deaths: c. 1,300
- Injuries: c. 4,000
- Property damage: 41 city blocks destroyed

The Cali Explosion was a disaster that occurred at 01:07 (UTC−5) on 7 August 1956 in downtown Cali, Colombia. It was caused by the sudden detonation of six trucks, driven by civilians and members of the Colombian army, that were carrying 42 tonnes of dynamite packed in 1,053 boxes. The cargo had come from the port of Buenaventura and was intended for road construction work in the department of Cundinamarca. At the time, Cali had around 400,000 inhabitants; estimates place the death toll at approximately 1,300 dead and 4,000 injured.

== Events ==
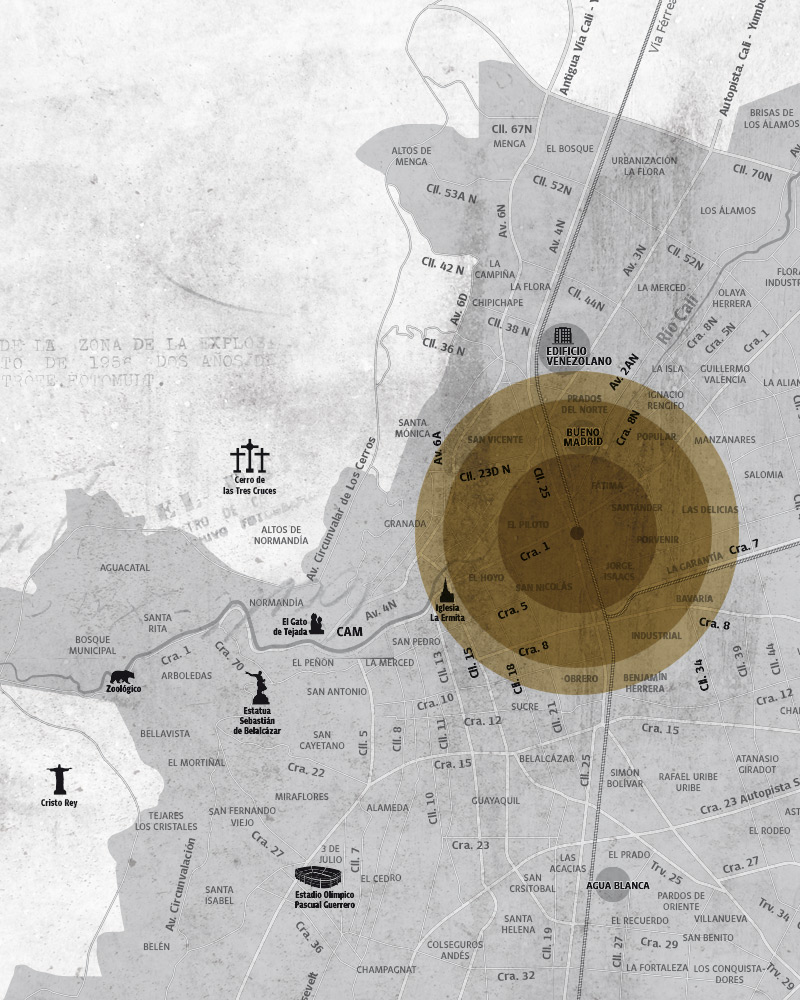
Map showing the range of the explosion

The explosion happened in the early hours of the morning, in the area between Carreras 1 and 8 and Calles 25 and 26, in the San Nicolás neighborhood, the site of the Pacific Railway station. The six trucks had travelled from Buenaventura and were parked at the old Pacific Railway station, after having been moved from the Pichincha Battalion. The explosion destroyed 41 city blocks and left a crater 50 metres wide and 25 metres deep. The blast wave wrecked buildings, homes and businesses, including the Belmonte market square, and killed an estimated 1,300 people while injuring 4,000 more. Six neighborhoods, all of which still exist today, were affected: San Nicolás, El Porvenir, El Hoyo, El Piloto, Fátima and Jorge Isaacs.

The blast registered as an earthquake of magnitude 4.3 on the Richter scale; beyond the tremor itself, the noise of the explosion was heard as far away as Buga, Palmira, Santander de Quilichao, Caloto and Jamundí.

Several explanations for the cause of the explosion circulated at the time: that the trucks had overheated, or that a soldier's weapon had discharged accidentally. The most widely accepted theory is that a man smoking nearby threw a lit cigarette close to one of the trucks, triggering a chain reaction. The force of the blast was such that many graves in the city's central cemetery were torn open.

The disaster occurred during the government of president Gustavo Rojas Pinilla, who attributed its origin to the political opposition, which had recently signed the Benidorm pact (which would later lead to the creation of the National Front). With the country polarized between the traditional Liberal and Conservative parties, the tragedy quickly took on political overtones, particularly because Cali was seen as a city strongly opposed to the government of the day.

== Reactions ==
In the city's central cemetery, 3,725 skulls and body parts were buried in a mass grave. An iron cross was erected near the intersection of Calles 25 and 26 to commemorate the tragedy.

As soon as the disaster became known, local Colombian organizations mobilized to help, including the Colombian Red Cross and the Sendas organization (Secretaría de Acción Social y Protección Infantil, the predecessor of today's ICBF).

== Popular culture ==
- Bloody Flesh (Spanish: Carne de tu carne, "Flesh of Your Flesh") is a 1983 Colombian drama horror film written and directed by Cali-born filmmaker Carlos Mayolo, inspired by the explosion.
- Ecuadorian singer Lucho Bowen recorded "Lamento Caleño", a song written by Colombian composer Nano Molina describing the day of the tragedy.
- In the novel Museo de lo inútil by Rodrigo Parra Sandoval, the explosion forms a central part of the narrative.
- The annual Feria de Cali festival emerged as a strategy to help revitalize the city in the aftermath of the tragedy.
