= Giovanna Rivero =

Bolivian novelist and short story writer (born 1972)

Giovanna Rivero (born 1972) is a Bolivian novelist and short story writer. She is one of Bolivia's most successful contemporary fiction writers. Her work has been described as belonging to the Latin American Gothic literary movement.

== Biography ==
Born in Montero, Santa Cruz, Rivero was awarded the Santa Cruz Municipal Prize for Literature in 1997 for her short story collection Las bestias (The beasts). In 2005, she received the Franz Tamayo Short Story Prize for La Dueña de nuestros sueños (The owner of our dreams). In 2004, she took part in the Iowa Writing Program at the University of Iowa and in 2006 she was awarded a Fulbright Scholarship which allowed her to obtain a master's degree in Latin-American literature from the University of Florida. She went on to receive a doctorate from the same university in 2014. In 2011, she was one of the 25 new Latin-American talents chosen by Mexico's Guadalajara Book Fair.

Commenting on her latest novel, 98 segundos sin sombra (98 seconds with no shadow), Fernando Iwasaki of El Mercurio comments: "Giovanna Rivero writes good prose, able to create powerful characters. With [this work] she has added her name to the book of Latin-American literature." The novel has been published by the Spanish publishing house Caballo de Troya, contributing to Rivero's growing international success.

In addition to writing novels and short stories, Rivero is a regular contributor to local and national newspapers. She also teaches semiotics and journalism at the Univeridad Privada de Santa Cruz de la Sierra.

== Selected works ==
- 1994: Nombrando el eco, short stories
- 1997: Las bestias, short stories
- 2001: Las camaleonas, novel
- 2002: Sentir lo oscuro, short stories
- 2002: La dueña de nuestros sueños, children's stories
- 2005: Contraluna, short stories
- 2006: Sangre dulce, short stories
- 2008: Tukzon, historias colaterales, novel
- 2009: Niñas y detectives, short stories
- 2011: Helena 2022: La vera crónica de un naufragio en el tiempo, young adult novel
- 2014: 98 segundos sin sombra, novel
- 2015: Para comerte mejor, short stories
- 2020: Tierra fresca de su tumba, short stories / Fresh Dirt From the Grave (tr. Isabel Adey for Charco Press, United Kingdom)
- 2020: Ana Bolena, historical-biographical novel (Colección Mujeres Poderosas)
- 2022: Roxelana, historical-biographical novel (Colección Mujeres Poderosas)
- 2025: Alma oscura del alba, novel
- 2025: Un resplandor, short stories
