= The Vampires of Poverty =

The Vampires of Poverty, aka Agarrando Pueblo
- Movie poster for Agarrando Pueblo
- Directed by: Luis Ospina, Carlos Mayolo
- Cinematography: Fernando Velez (black and white), Eduardo Carvajal (color)
- Release date: 1977
- Running time: 29 minutes
- Country: Colombia
- Language: Spanish

The Vampires of Poverty, originally released under the title Agarrando Pueblo ("Grasping the People"), is a Colombian mockumentary film released in 1977. It was directed by Luis Ospina and Carlos Mayolo.

== Plot ==
The film follows filmmakers hired by a German television channel to make a film about poverty in Latin America. The film was shot in Cali, Colombia. It opens with a scene of the filmmakers giving stage direction to a homeless man begging in front of a church. In scenes that follow, the filmmakers are depicted shoving cameras into the faces of an indigent child and an elderly lady, paying young boys to take off their clothes and swim in a dirty fountain, stalking a mentally ill women across a street, asking a taxi driver where they can find crazy people and prostitutes, filming a street performer as he washes his face with shards of broken glass, and rehearsing scenes with paid actors.

At one point, a homeless person whose home has been invaded by the filmmakers interrupts the filming and declares: "Bloodsucking vampires! You only come here to make people laugh in far away places." When offered money to permit the filmmakers to continue, he wipes his ass with the money, orders the filmmakers to leave his home, and chastises an actor for accepting money to dress up like poor person.

In the end, the man who interrupted the production is interviewed and states that his favorite part of the film is the satire. He boasts about his luck in being permitted the luxury of getting naked and wiping himself with freshly-minted bills.

== Production and credits ==
The film is a mockumentary addressing the topic of "misery porn" or what Colombian critics in the 1970s called "pornomiseria", the practice of making a spectacle out of poverty. It is critical of the use of sociological principles as cover for the exploitation and commodification of poverty. The film shifts between black-and-white footage depicting behind-the-scenes footage of the filmmakers at work and color footage showing scenes from their would-be documentary. The runtime is 28 minutes.

Production credits included:

- Luis Ospina - direction, editing and sound
- Carlos Mayolo - direction and acting
- Fernando Velez - black and white photography
- Eduardo Carvajal - color photography
- Luis Alfonso Londoño - the man who interrupts the production

== Reception ==
The film won recognition at the following film festivals:

- III Film Festival of the Colombian Institute of Culture - best documentary short film
- Lille International Film Festival (1978) - Novais-Teixeira Award
- Bilbao International Documentary Film Competition (1978) - special mention
- Oberhausen International Film Festival (1979) - Interfilm Prize
