= Mónica Ojeda =

Ecuadorian writer (born 1988)

- Ojeda at the Guadalajara International Book Fair in 2025
- Born: 1988 (age 37–38); Guayaquil, Ecuador
- Occupation: Writer
- Writing career
- Language: Spanish
- Years active: 2013-
- Genre: Latin American Gothic
- Notable works: Nefando, Jawbone

Mónica Ojeda Franco (born 1988) is an Ecuadorian writer. Ojeda has published poetry, novels and short stories. She describes her work as Andean gothic. A native of Guayaquil, she obtained her bachelor's degree before moving to Spain for a master's in creative writing. Ojeda emigrated from Ecuador to Spain in 2017.

Ojeda's work blends elements of horror fiction with Andean folklore and digital subcultures to explore contemporary social issues in Latin America. Her debut novel, La desfiguración Silva (2015), won the ALBA Narrativa Prize while she was attending university. She came to wider attention with Nefando (2016) and Mandíbula (2018; translated as Jawbone) and was a recipient of the Bogotá39 award for outstanding young Latin American writers in 2017. She has been described as one of Ecuador's most important living writers.

== Early life ==
Ojeda was born in Guayaquil in 1988. Her mother held a degree in literature and taught at a university. Ojeda would read Reader's Digest books and classics like Madame Bovary and Death in Venice from her mother's library as a child. At age ten, her mother found something she wrote. The joy and recognition it brought inspired her to study literature herself. Her grandfather influenced her decision to continue writing. Suffering from schizophrenia, he would mix real-life details with legends and myths. Ojeda decided at thirteen that she hoped to match the power of his storytelling.

Ojeda studied literature at the Universidad Católica de Santiago de Guayaquil before enrolling in a master's degree in creative writing in Barcelona. The Spanish publisher Candaya included one of her stories in an anthology of emerging Ibero-American writers in 2013. The next year, while still pursuing her master's degree, she won the 2014 Alba Narrativa Prize from the intergovernmental ALBA group for La disfiguración Silva (The Silva Disfiguration). It tells of a group of students who invent the biography of Gianella Silva, a supposedly forgotten filmmaker who was part of the Tzantzismo movement in 1960s Ecuador. The book was published in Havana, Cuba, in 2015.

In 2017, at the age of 29, Ojeda emigrated from Ecuador to Spain. She has cited the violence in her native Guayaquil as the reason for her permanent departure and explained that her literary work is "full of that violence, of those fears, but also of all that desire that makes up my historical-geographical experience with Ecuador". Her Spanish partner had spent three years in Ecuador, and the two married before Ojeda's emigration. Ojeda then spent three years in Spain without legal residency, describing the country's immigration process as difficult for Latin Americans.

== Later career ==
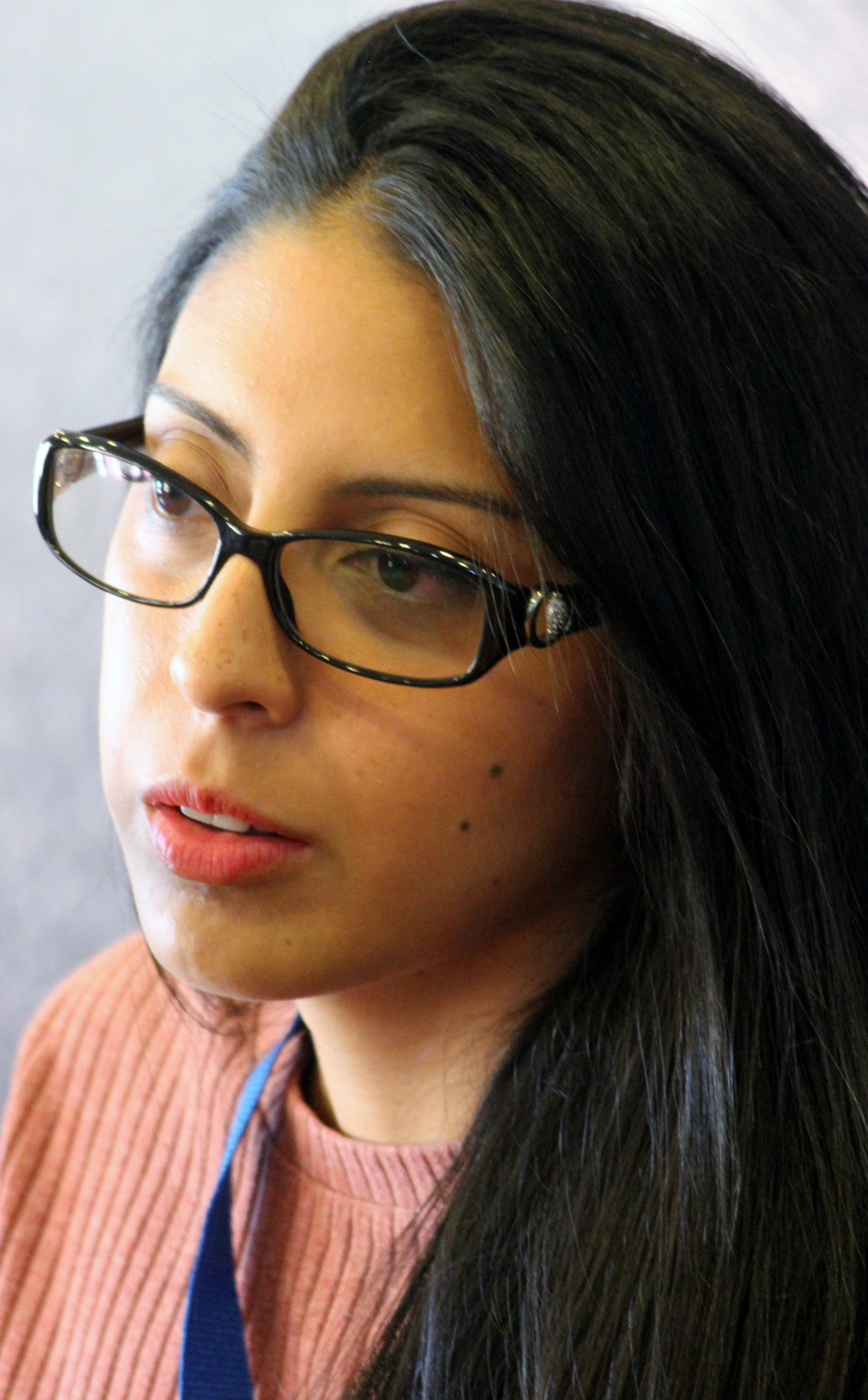
Mónica Ojeda in 2018

Candaya published Ojeda's second novel, Nefando, in 2016. It uses body horror and linguistic experimentation to depict a hacker named El Cuco and a forgotten video game. She later recalled that she started the novel in Guayaquil and completed it in Barcelona, where the quiet and isolation helped her write. Following the book's critical success, Ojeda was selected for the 2017 Bogotá39, an initiative of the Hay Festival and UNESCO's World Book Capital program to recognize the best young writers in Latin America under 40 years old. She questioned the award's criteria and said that only a small percentage of some countries' output reached the Spanish judges. The following year, La Hora called her one of Ecuador's most important living writers.

In January 2018, Ojeda published the novel Mandíbula, which tells the story of two teenage girls obsessed with horror stories and creepypastas, one of whom is kidnapped by her literature teacher. It received favorable reviews and was described as "one of the novels of the season" by the Spanish newspaper El País, which ranked it 12th in its list of the 50 best books of 2018. The novel was also selected as one of the ten finalists for the Mario Vargas Llosa Biennial Novel Prize in its 2018 edition. Ojeda received the Prince Claus Fund's Next Generation Award in 2019, with the committee writing that her books "have been pivotal in reshaping modern Spanish-language horror fiction".

In late 2019, Ojeda published her second poetry collection, Historia de la leche (Severo Editorial; released in Spain by Candaya in 2020). It reimagines the biblical story of Cain and Abel through female characters named Caína and Mabel, and features their mother in a plot Ojeda compared to a Greek tragedy. The text subverts traditional Catholic archetypes of the Virgin Mary by depicting maternal milk not as a source of nurture, but as a toxic fluid that transmits inherited violence and guilt. In March 2021, she participated in a Zoom discussion with the Mexican author and academic Cristina Rivera Garza. Around twenty individuals entered the virtual meeting and displayed graphic images of women who were victims of violence.

Ojeda was selected as one of five finalists for the sixth edition of the Ribera del Duero Short Story Award with her 2020 collecton of short stories El mundo de arriba y el mundo de abajo. Páginas de Espuma published it in October 2020 as Las voladoras, a collection influenced by the violence women face in Ecuador as well as the country's geography. For example, in one story a shaman takes his dead daughter from the moorland to the top of a volcano. Ojeda called this style "Andean gothic".

Granta magazine listed Ojeda as one of the 25 best young Spanish-language novelists in 2021. In an interview with El País in July of 2021, she criticized the tendency to market Latin American women writers as a unified literary movement and said that she would not have received the critical attention she did if she had not emigrated to Spain. The following year, Sarah Booker's translation of Mandíbula, titled Jawbone in English, was a finalist for the National Book Award for Translated Literature in the United States. It went on to become her most discussed novel among literary critics.

Chamanes eléctricos en la fiesta del sol, Ojeda's most recent novel, was first published in 2024 through Literatura Random House before Granta's 2026 translation, Electric Shamans at the Festival of the Sun. Set in a futuristic Andean landscape where a group of young people attend an experimental music festival, the novel uses a nonlinear structure and the Indigenous Kichwa cosmology to depict generational family trauma.

In 2025, it was announced that a television adaptation of Jawbone was in the works with Diego Luna among the producers and Michelle Garza Cervera set to direct. Ojeda told Harper's Bazaar that negotiations had started two to three years prior. The magazine noted that news of Ojeda's adaptation came amid a wave of similar projects based on the works of Latin American women authors, such as the 2023 adaptation of Fernanda Melchor's Hurricane Season.

== Style and themes ==
Ojeda's work draws on gothic fiction to explore the psychology of fear and the social realities of contemporary Latin America, often depicting taboo subjects. She places special emphasis on power dynamics and familial relationships. In Nefando, for example, she focuses on the emotional and psychological damage of child abuse and incorporates the dark web, the unseen portion of the internet. Ojeda used the difficult subject matter to interrogate what she called "the mechanics of desire" and why individuals inflict harm on others. Her work has also explored the sexual awakening of minors.

Another recurring theme in her work is the relationship between the feminine and the monstrous. In Jawbone, the protagonist sees a crocodile and later dreams that the animal penetrates her best friend. The crocodile's jaw has been interpreted as representing maternal bonds as simultaneously protective and threatening, as well as symbolizing the everyday dangers facing women in Ojeda's native Guayaquil. Similarly, in Historia de la leche, she uses biblical imagery to portray a monstrous maternal figure whose womb functions as a site of simultaneous life and decomposition. Ojeda has expressed an interest in female monsters, from the Gorgons and Scylla of Greek mythology to Latin American figures like La Llorona, La Tunda, and La Patasola, and in reinterpreting them for a modern context. In "Las voladoras", the titular story from her 2020 short story collection, Ojeda uses Andean witches to subvert traditional connotations of monstrosity and give her female protagonists agency against gendered violence.

Ojeda's exploration of horror themes often combines Indigenous Andean cosmogonies with contemporary technologies. She describes Ecuador as a place where "the ancestral coexists with the present and the future". Literary scholar Elisa Sampson Vera Tudela writes that unlike earlier mestiza writers such as Rosario Castellanos, whose indigenista literature drew on her personal upbringing among Indigenous communities to promote cultural integration and advocacy, Ojeda's relation to Indigenous themes is "one of estrangement". For Sampson Vera Tudela, Ojeda's strength is to act as a "listener" who brings an outsider queer perspective to these cultural encounters. Other scholars interpret Ojeda's work as an "updated" form of Gothic and horror fiction because she mixes ancestral folklore and digital subcultures with folk horror and weird fiction. Ojeda describes her technique as "hacking" traditional Gothic fiction to ground fear in specific historical, territorial, and geographic realities.

=== Literary classification ===
I wrote Las voladoras thinking about exploring what the “Andean Gothic” was for me. I’ve concluded that it has to do with writing the experience of fear with the entire Andes imaginary, its symbols, myths, and history. Every geographic space has its own horrors: fear is geographic, political, historical. The Andean Gothic then, would be an approach to thinking about fear from a specific geography, in this case the Andes mountains.

— Mónica Ojeda, Interview with Latin American Literature Today

Ojeda has been grouped with contemporary writers such as Mariana Enríquez, Samanta Schweblin, and Fernanda Melchor amid a rise in gothic fiction in Latin America, a trend linked to economic inequality and increasing levels of violence since the 1980s. The Guardian positioned Nefando as a departure from the magical realism with which Latin American literature has often been associated. Some critics describe this trend as a "new Latin American gothic", or "Latin American female gothic". Ojeda has used the term "Andean gothic" on social media and to promote literary events. In a 2026 article for Latin American Research Review, Luis Medina Cordova proposed "mangrove gothic" to describe Guayaquil's influence on Ojeda's Jawbone and María Fernanda Ampuero's Cockfight. He stressed Guayaquil's distance from the Andes mountains and the prevalence of mangrove trees in the coastal city.

Ojeda does not claim credit for the Andean gothic label. She credits an academic named Álvaro Alemán who coined the term at an Ecuadorian literary congress in 2016. While writing Las voladoras, Ojeda developed her own interpretation of the label, blending ancestral oral folklore with domestic violence and digital subcultures. Her version of Andean gothic is anchored in the mountains, volcanoes, and moorlands of Ecuador. Although she has embraced Andean gothic as a creative framework and self-promotional descriptor, Ojeda maintains a critical distance from commercial genre categorization, warning that marketing labels imposed by global publishers risk exoticizing or oversimplifying Latin American literature.

== Reception ==
View of the Andes from Quito, Ecuador. Ojeda describes her work as Andean gothic.

El País wrote that Ojeda "was greeted as one of the most powerful Latin American novelists today" following the publication of Nefando and praised the novel for transcending horror genre conventions. Writing for Asymptote, María del Pilar Cuairán Chavarría described Ojeda as "one of the most renowned writers in Latin American literature right now". Her review of Sarah Booker's 2022 Jawbone translation praised the novel's treatment of topical issues like violence and misogyny while the translation preserved its culturally specific language. Jawbone was noted for its portrayal of contemporary phenomena such as creepypasta and true crime, which World Literature Today said spoke to young women internationally. The magazine contrasted these elements with the novel's engagement with established Latin American themes such as the psychological fiction of Manuel Puig or the political commentary of Roberto Bolaño. Her style of psychological horror has also been compared to fellow Ecuadorian Pablo Palacio.

Ojeda's treatment of sexuality and violence in her fiction has elicited strong reactions. Bomb magazine described Nefando's treatment of child abuse as "genuinely hard to read". Locus, while calling Jawbone "top-grade horror (and frankly top-grade literature)", said that the subject matter was "not for everyone". Fellow writer Mariana Enríquez describes herself as a superfan of Ojeda's work but says that some fellow writers, particularly parents, are unable to read it, describing Nefando as "a risky and unbearable novel (in a good sense)".

The rising popularity of Latin American women authors led El País to ask in 2017 whether a boom feminino (feminine boom) existed, referencing the Latin American Boom of the 1960s and 1970s. Ojeda describes the term boom feminino as Eurocentric and has argued that the reception, not the quality of women's writing, changed. In a 2023 interview, she said that she had been asked about the subject many times and stated, "We want to discover what is happening now, we want to connect with traditions that may not be those that have always been seen from the global north when thinking about Latin America. The view of Latin American literature from the global north is quite reductionist." In her analysis of the Andean gothic label, Silvia Beatriz Fernández of the Autonomous University of Querétaro characterizes Ojeda's fiction as a rejection of the Boom's focus on cultured white male protagonists facing existential dilemmas in favor of marginalized subjects and structural social trauma.

== Personal life ==
Ojeda identifies as spiritual but atheist. She has said that there are ways to approach religion beyond worship.

In January 2019, Ojeda disclosed that she had filed a complaint against her former Spanish partner for harassment and death threats. She used the experience to speak out against gendered violence in her native Ecuador.

== Works ==
=== Novels ===
- La desfiguración Silva (2015)
- Nefando (2016). Translated in 2023 as Nefando by Sarah Booker.
- Mandíbula (2018). Translated in 2022 as Jawbone by Sarah Booker.
- Chamanes eléctricos en la fiesta del sol (2024). Translated in 2026 as Electric Shamans at the Festival of the Sun by Sarah Booker.

=== Poetry ===
- El ciclo de las piedras (2015)
- Historia de la leche (2019)

=== Short stories ===
- Caninos (2017), individual story
- Las voladoras (2020)

== See also ==
- Ecuadorian literature

== Bibliography ==
- Armijos Echeverría, Andrea (2 March 2023). "'My writing comes from fear and desire': A conversation with Mónica Ojeda". Latin American Literature Today (25).
- Esposito, Veronica (2023). "Putting a collective finger on the pulse: The new cadre of Latin American women writers". World Literature Today. 97 (2): 18–21. ISSN 0196-3570.
- Fernández, Silvia Beatriz (1 July 2024). "Relecturas de la tradición latinoamericana: el gótico andino de Mónica Ojeda como propuesta superadora del boom" [Rereadings of the Latin American tradition: the Andean Gothic of Monica Ojeda as a proposal that overcomes the boom]. Kipus: Revista Andina de Letras y Estudios Culturales (in Spanish) (56): 17–29. doi:10.32719/13900102.2024.56.2.
- Leonardo-Loayza, Richard (3 May 2024). "Abyección, violencia de género y gótico andino en 'Sangre coagulada', de Mónica Ojeda" [Abyection, gender violence and Andean Gothic in ‘Sangre coagulada', by Monica Ojeda]. Acta Scientiarum. Language and Culture (in Spanish). 46 (1): 1–10. doi:10.4025/actascilangcult.v46i1.67518. hdl:10757/676089.
- Medina Cordova, Luis (23 April 2026). "Guayaquil de mis horrores: The mangrove gothic and contemporary literature in Ecuador's fear capital". Latin American Research Review: 1–17. doi:10.1017/lar.2026.10129.
- Sampson Vera Tudela, Elisa (11 September 2025). "The Andean Gothic as local form and global story: How contemporary Latin American women writers are (re)writing indigeneity". Mistral | Journal of Latin American Women's Intellectual & Cultural History. 4 (1): 17–31. doi:10.21827/mistral.4.42940.
- Vela Hidalgo, Alejandra (September 2024). "Legado de feminidad a través de la leche: culpa, ira, abyección y poesía en Historia de la leche de Mónica Ojeda" [Legacy of femininity through milk: Guilt, anger, abjection and poetry in Historia de la leche by Mónica Ojeda]. Canadian Journal of Latin American and Caribbean Studies / Revue canadienne des études latino-américaines et caraïbes. 49 (3): 302–316. doi:10.1080/08263663.2024.2351698.
