= Monster of the Mangones =

Unidentified Colombian serial killer

- Other name: 'The Cali Vampire'

Details
- Victims: 30–38
- Span of crimes: 1963–1970s
- Country: Colombia
- State: Valle del Cauca
- Date apprehended: Never apprehended

The Monster of the Mangones is the name given to an unidentified Colombian serial killer who, between the 1960s and 1970s, murdered between 30 and 38 preadolescent and teenage boys in Cali. Believed to be a native of the city, he would kidnap and later kill most of his victims in various remote vacant lots.

At the time, it was the most notorious criminal case in the country's history. For some, the Monster was a simple myth or legend, while others believe that he actually existed, later earning comparisons with Luis Garavito.

His modus operandi consisted of inserting needles into the heart and thorax, assaults, rapes and torture. It is believed that he used syringes to draw blood from his victims. The killer was described as a true sexual sadist, and possible sufferer of Renfield's syndrome.

== History ==
During the 1960s, citizens of Cali lived in fear and uncertainty, as children and adolescents began disappearing from the area. On November 5, 1963, the body of a paperboy was found in western Cali. After that, more cases of murdered young boys began cropping up, the bodies discarded in a type of urban alley known as mangones. On December 4, another boy was found on some grassland in the northern area of the city, in what is considered the second recorded homicide. Eight days later, a third body, lacking eyeballs, was discovered on the shores of the Aguacatal River. Two more bodies were discovered before the end of the year: one near the railway station and the other in Prados del Norte.

At the end of the year, five murders were recorded between November and December, all of them similar in their brutality. In January 1964, Cali police found the mummified body of another boy; two days after, the remains of 12-year-old Alberto Garzón were discovered. Another three corpses were found in the same month, in different sectors of the town. Between February and April, there were an additional three murders: one very close to Tequendama, another in Puerto Mallarino and the last at a potrero.

Faced with this wave of murders, the authorities sent a series of notices to the public, claiming that these bodies were likely taken from cemeteries and later scattered around Cali, mostly in solitary areas. Despite this, much of the press and public demanded that the killings be solved, and the terror finally put to an end.

The crimes ceased for several months, although more cases were reported again in late 1964. All of these events are believed to have claimed the lives of between 30 and 38 young boys and men. The perpetrator was never captured, and he was later nicknamed the "Monster of the Mangones".

== Film adaptation ==
The case led to the creation of a film titled Pura sangre, by director Luis Ospina. The story tells about a man who needs fresh blood from children and teenagers, as he suffers from a peculiar disease. The film was released in 1982, with most of the scenes shot in Cali and one in New York City; it cost 16 million Colombian pesos, and premiered at the Cartagena Film Festival, where it was considered the "first Colombian horror film with international quality".

The film also touches on issues related to vampirism, as it is about an individual who needs to ingest blood in order to survive.

== See also ==
- List of fugitives from justice who disappeared
- List of serial killers in Colombia

== Bibliography ==
- Cruz Niño, Esteban (2013). Monsters in Colombia do exist: Serial Killers (in Spanish). Penguin Random House. ISBN 9789588789422.
- López Betancur, Olga del Pilar (2005). Yellow and Red: Aesthetics of the Tabloid Press (in Spanish). Universidad Eafit. ISBN 9789588173887.
- Parra Sandoval, Rodrigo (1996). Tarzan and the Naked Philosopher (in Spanish). Arango. ISBN 9789582700065.
- Caicedo Estela, Andrés (2002). Bogged Angels, or, Stories for Youngsters (in Spanish). Norma. ISBN 9789580469087.
- Eljaiek-Rodríguez, Gabriel (2017). Ghost Forest: The Gothic in Latin American Literature and Cinema (in Spanish). Pontificia Universidad Javeriana. ISBN 9789587810882.
- Puerta Domínguez, Simón (2015). Cinema and nation: negotiation, construction and identity representation in Colombia (in Spanish). Fondo Editorial FCSH. ISBN 9789588890869.
- Jarrín B, Humberto; Rozo S, Andrés Giovanni (2019). Glimpses Volume II: Encounters with the author and his work (in Spanish). Programa Editorial Universidad Autónoma de Occidente. ISBN 9789588994918.
