= Bloody Flesh =

1983 film

- Theatrical release poster
- Directed by: Carlos Mayolo
- Written by: Carlos Mayolo; Jorge Nieto; Elsa Vásquez
- Produced by: Fernando Berón; Bertha de Carvajal; Anthony Halliday
- Starring: Adriana Herrán; David Guerrero
- Cinematography: Gabriel Beristain
- Edited by: Karen Lamassonne; Luis Ospina
- Music by: Mario Gomez Vignes
- Production companies: Producciones Visuales; Focine
- Distributed by: Zona A
- Release date: 31 October 1983 (Colombia)
- Running time: 94 minutes
- Country: Colombia
- Language: Spanish

Bloody Flesh (Spanish: Carne de tu carne, "Flesh of Your Flesh") is a 1983 Colombian drama horror film directed and co-written by Carlos Mayolo.

== Plot ==
On August 6, 1956, the Grandmother from an upper-class family in Cali dies. The descendants are called to her house to hear the will of the grandmother, two of the heirs are teenagers Andrés Alfonso and his half sister Margaret, who has just arrived from the United States. At dawn of the next day, a mysterious explosion occurs in the city, so the family moves to its house in the countryside. Andrés and Margaret are asked to go to a nearly farm, "La Emma", for supplies and to tell their great-uncle Enrique about the death of the grandmother (his sister), who also left him an inheritance.

Enrique is considered the "black sheep" of the family because of his Communistic beliefs. Andrés and Margaret slowly develop a strong attraction, resulting in an incestuous relationship that mirrors their ancestors, whose ghosts begin possessing both them. The lovers start murdering and spreading terror in the region. Both become cannibalistic and vampiric creatures, similar to indigenous myths as "Madremonte". By taking a victim's son of a peasant family, the brothers are killed and buried.

The family is seeking Andrés and Margaret, ignoring their actions. Later, a farmer discovers the place where the two teenagers were buried and left it shocked after seeing the lovers rise from their grave.

== Cast ==
- Adriana Herrán as Margareth
- David Guerrero as Andrés Alfonso
- Santiago García as Andrés' father
- Vicky Hernandez as Julia

== Reception ==
=== Critical reception ===
Bloody Flesh was re-released for DVD on January 8, 2013. George Pacheco, blogger from 10K bullets, called the film "a memorable little film, despite its apparent, initial limitations". Ian Jane, from Rock Shock Pop, wrote "There’s a bit of a learning curve here, maybe, but even with those obstacles it’s easy to appreciate the mood and atmosphere that Mayolo... is able to conjure up in the latter half of this odd movie."

=== Accolades ===
The film participated in the 1984 Bogotá Film Festival, where it won the Best Cinematography award. The next year was screened at Fantasporto, where was nominated for Best Film and won the Best Actress award for Adriana Herrán.
