= Las voladoras =

2020 horror short story collection by Mónica Ojeda

- Author: Mónica Ojeda
- Language: Spanish
- Genre: Short story
- Published: 2020
- Publisher: Páginas de Espuma
- Publication place: Ecuador and Spain
- ISBN: 978-84-8393-282-7

Las voladoras (English: The Flying Women) is a book of short stories by Ecuadorian writer Mónica Ojeda, published for the first time in 2020 by publishing house Páginas de Espuma. The book is composed of eight stories that take place in Andean settings which are marked by mysticism, violence, ancestral rites, and horror, in a style that the author herself defined as Andean gothic. Some of the themes she addresses include: feminicides, domestic violence, grief, child abuse, forbidden love, and abortion, among others.

The book was well received by critics and was included in several lists of the best books of 2020. Moreover, it was a finalist for the Premio de Narrativa Breve Ribera del Duero and the Premio Finestres literary awards.

The title Las voladoras comes from the first story in the book, which in turn is based on a myth from the town of Mira, in Carchi Province, Ecuador. The people of Mira believe that women go into a magical trance during the night, go up to the roofs of their houses, spread honey on their underarms, and start to fly, all of this without having any memory whatsoever of these events the morning after.

== Contents ==
Seven of the eight stories in the book had never been published before. The eighth, Caninos, was originally published in 2017. The stories are the following:

Title	Synopsis
Las voladoras (Note: English: The flying women)	A girl who has just entered puberty observes the reactions produced on her parents by las voladoras, mythical beings with only one eye and long, dark hair, who used to appear to her family. While her mother reacts with hatred, her father seems to be attracted to them; although, apart from las voladoras, the protagonist and her family are hiding a secret that is much more disturbing.
Sangre coagulada (Note: English: Congealed blood)	A girl is sent by her father to live in the Andean páramo with her grandmother, who was seen as the town's witch for performing healing rituals and abortions. For the protagonist, blood becomes a symbol of the cycle of life and death, such as in the cases of animal slaughter and her own menstruation. As a consequence of a traumatic event, the protagonist finds revenge to be the only possible way to impart justice.
Cabeza voladora (Note: English: Flying head)	A teacher finds the head of a woman who died by decapitation, and she soon finds out that it was her neighbor's daughter. Her feelings of guilt lead her to become involved in the world of the umas, witches capable of separating their heads from their bodies and leaving these behind to fly in search of people to seduce and torment.
Caninos (Note: English: Canines)	A middle-class family made up of Papi, (Note: English: Daddy) Mami, (Note: English: Mommy) Hija, (Note: English: Daughter) and Ñaña (Note: English: Sister) hides a past full of trauma, alcoholism, and cruelty. Papi starts to suffer a transformation that begins with his teeth falling out, but which increasingly pushes him towards behaving as a dog, with the rest of the family seemingly not being surprised by this. The disappearance of his teeth, which used to represent his strength and virility, seems to hide a much bigger and disturbing secret.
Slasher	Two twin sisters, known as "the Bárbaras," carry out performances of experimental music and noise music, which one of them can only feel through vibrations due to her being deaf. The sister who is not deaf has harbored a wish for a very long time: cutting her twin's tongue with a stiletto. Therefore, she starts planning a performance that takes on the characteristics of a sacrifice.
Soroche (Note: English: Mountain sickness)	A story about the contradictions of friendship, ugliness, and bodily deterioration. It is told by multiple narrators: a group of friends, all upper-middle-class women, who travel to a mountain in the Andes. They are trying to cheer one of them up after her ex-husband violated her privacy by leaking an intimate video on the internet.
Terremoto (Note: English: Earthquake)	Lucrecia and Luciana are two sisters united by an incestuous love, who live in a rural setting and who suddenly see themselves threatened by a great volcanic eruption.
El mundo de arriba y el mundo de abajo (Note: English: The world above and the world below)	After the death of his daughter and tortured by grief, an indigenous shaman sets out on a journey to a volcano with her corpse, in an attempt to bring her back to life through a spell. His daughter is reborn, using her mother's body. However, instead of coming back to life as a normal person, she does so as a sort of zombie. The shaman tries to complete the resurrection, but he slowly starts to understand that words cannot bring the dead back to life.

== Writing and themes ==
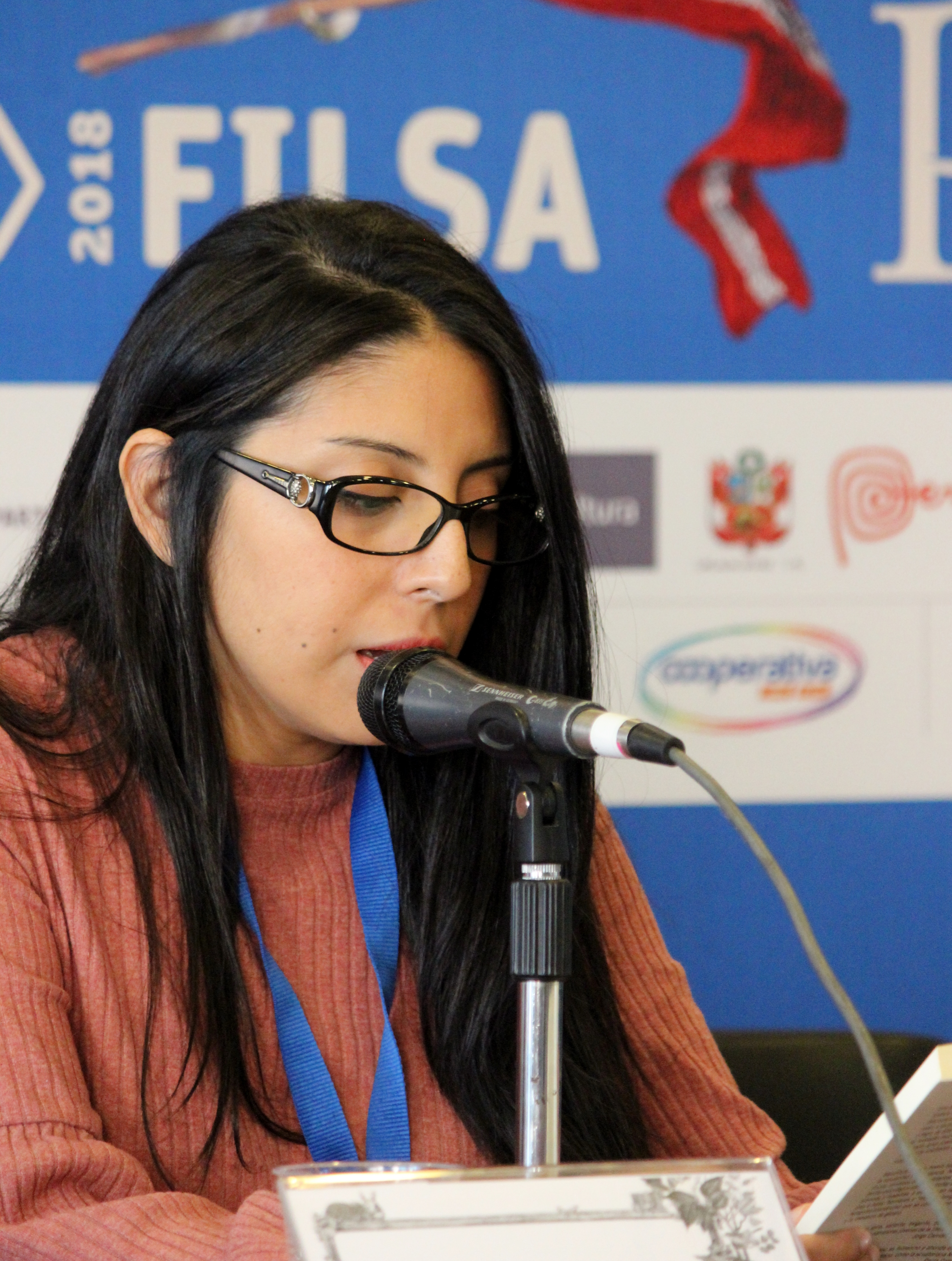
Mónica Ojeda during her appearance at the Santiago International Book Fair (FILSA) in 2018.

According to Ojeda, the original idea for the book was born out of a creative curiosity for the possibilities that short stories could offer, as a result of the publication of Caninos in 2017. In turn, this gave her the notion to write a book in which each story was connected organically through the same general idea, which the author decided would be the Andean gothic genre. This term reached Ojeda through Ecuadorian academic Álvaro Alemán, who had mentioned it years before in a conference of Ecuadorian scholars. Since there had not been any academic theorizing on the concept at that time, Ojeda was able to freely explore in her book the idea of the Andean gothic genre, which she later defined as un tipo de literatura que trabaja la violencia (y por tanto el miedo) generada en una zona geográfica específica: la Cordillera de los Andes, con todas sus narraciones, mitos, símbolos y su desnuda contemporaneidad. (Note: English: A type of literature that works on the violence (and thus on the fear) generated in a specific geographic area—the Andes mountain range—with all of its narratives, myths, symbols, and naked contemporaneity.) As in some of her previous works, the general themes she chose for the book include fear, horror, and violence.

Ojeda wrote the book during a three-month period from her residence in Madrid. This first draft was completed in December 2019 and sent to the literary competition Premio de Narrativa Breve Ribera del Duero, which included it among its finalists in February 2020. In the following months, Ojeda worked on polishing the book, a process that coincided with the lockdown due to the COVID-19 pandemic.

Some of the stories in the book include legends from the oral tradition of the Andean peoples, specifically in stories like Las voladoras (which includes the creatures of the same name that are native to the town of Mira, in Carchi Province), Cabeza voladora (which mentions the witches known as umas), and to a lesser extent in Soroche (which makes a reference to the myth of the suicidal condor). Apart from these legends, some stories were inspired by other authors or by reports in the crime section of newspapers. The idea for Cabeza voladora, for instance, was born when Ojeda found out about a feminicide that took place in Ecuador, in which a woman had been beheaded. This incident coincided with her readings about the umas and their ability to willingly detach their own heads. In El mundo de arriba y el mundo de abajo, Ojeda sought to write a story in the manner of an incantation, reminiscent of the poem Weeping for Pedro Jara, by Ecuadorian poet Efraín Jara Idrovo. Terremoto, which the author referred to as a "story-poem," was inspired by the writings of Canadian poet Anne Carson.

== Reception ==
The book was very well received by critics. Before it was published, Ojeda sent the manuscript for the book with the title El mundo de arriba y el mundo de abajo to participate in the 2020 version of the literary competition Premio de Narrativa Breve Ribera del Duero, in which it finished among five finalists out of 1,079 entries. Afterwards, it finished among the three finalists of the 2021 version of literary award Premio Finestres de Narrativa. Media outlets and cultural magazines such as El País, El Mundo, The New York Times, and Culturamas included it in their lists of the best books of 2020.

The review by newspaper El Periódico de Catalunya, written by Ricardo Baixeras, praised the book, referring to it as un libro de una contundencia asombrosa, conformado por una estética unitaria en unos relatos que respiran un mismo aire lingüístico. (Note: English: A book of astonishing bluntness, composed of a unifying aesthetic in stories that breathe the same linguistic air) Claudia Sterling, from digital outlet Pulzo, was even more complimentary, praising in particular the use of the horror genre in the book, to which she referred as a whole, thusly: [un] verdadero tesoro de la literatura latinoamericana, (Note: English: A true treasure of Latin American literature) made up of relatos sublimes que nos reconectan con la naturaleza, los mitos y el Universo. (Note: English: Sublime tales that reconnect us with nature, myths, and the universe) On his part, Ecuadorian writer Eduardo Varas highlighted the strength of the language used by Ojeda, the thematic unity of the work, and its exploration of horror and grief.

Spanish writer Marta Sanz, in a review written for El País, remarked on Soroche and Caninos, referring to them as "excelentes cuentos (...) que invitan a taparse los ojos con la mano. Y dan calambre", (Note: English: Excellent stories (…) that call on us to cover our eyes. And shock us.) apart from referring to Ojeda as a "sabia escritora de ambición telúrica". (Note: English: Wise writer of an earthy ambition) In an analysis published in magazine Amazing Stories, academic Iván Rodrigo Mendizábal referred to El mundo de arriba y el mundo de abajo as the esencial (Note: English: Essential) story in the book, an opinion shared by José Miguel Giráldez, from El Correo Gallego, who also singled out this story as his favorite and referred to the book as a whole as [un] libro coherente y brutal. (Note: English: A coherent and brutal book) In an interview, Ojeda herself said that El mundo de arriba y el mundo de abajo was her favorite story in the book.

== See also ==
- Mónica Ojeda
- Caninos (short story)
- Latin American Gothic
- Ecuadorian literature

== Additional bibliography ==
- Alcántara Carbajal, Isabel; Uribe Hernández, Álvaro Ernesto (22 March 2022). "Quien escucha, tiembla. El uso del sonido en Las voladoras de Mónica Ojeda" (PDF). Humanitas (in Spanish). 1 (2). Mexico: Autonomous University of Nuevo León: 191–217. doi:10.29105/revistahumanitas1.2-8. ISSN 2683-3247.
- Carretero Sanguino, Andrea (2021). "El encuentro entre el monstruo y el mito: el gótico andino y la construcción de la realidad en Las voladoras de Mónica Ojeda" (PDF). Cuadernos de Aleph (in Spanish) (13). Madrid, Spain: Complutense University of Madrid: 169–185. ISSN 2174-8713.
- Leonardo-Loayza, Richard Angelo (22 June 2022). "Lo gótico andino en las voladoras (2020) de Mónica Ojeda" (PDF). Brumal: Revista de investigación sobre lo Fantástico (in Spanish). 10 (1. Lo fantástico andino (siglos xx y xxi) y manifestaciones del monstruo fantástico en la ficción contemporánea.). Barcelona, Spain: Autonomous University of Barcelona. doi:10.5565/rev/brumal.855. ISSN 2014-7910.
