= Jawbone (novel) =

Novel

Mandíbula
- First edition cover
- Author: Mónica Ojeda
- Language: Spanish
- Genre: fiction
- Publisher: Candaya
- Publication date: January 2018
- Publication place: Ecuador
- Pages: 288
- ISBN: 978-8-415-93449-3

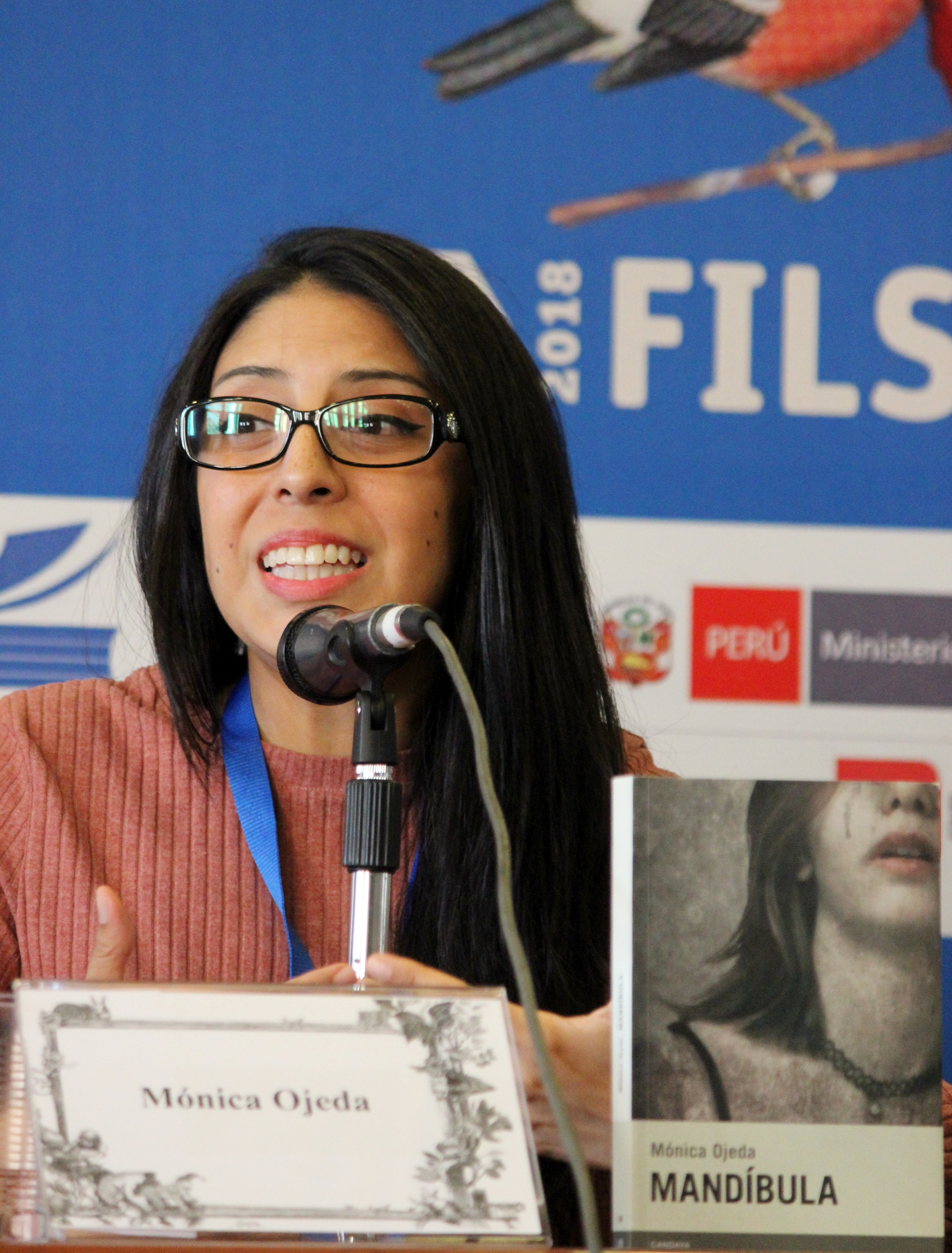
The author, Mónica Ojeda, with a copy of the novel in 2018.

Jawbone (Spanish: Mandíbula) is a novel by Ecuadorian writer Mónica Ojeda, published in 2018. The novel became a bestseller and Ojeda's most popular book to date. It received critical acclaim and was one of the ten finalists of the Mario Vargas Llosa Biennial Novel Prize in 2018. Its English translation was also well received and was a finalist of the Lambda Literary Award for Lesbian Fiction in 2023.

The novel narrates the story of Fernanda, a school student obsessed with horror stories, who is kidnapped by her language teacher. One of the other major characters, Annelise Van Isschot, had already appeared before in Ojeda's previous novel.

The themes explored in the book include relationships between mothers and daughters and among adolescent women, and various facets of feminism.

== Synopsis ==
Fernanda Montero Oliva is a teenager in Guayaquil who studies in an elite high school. One day she wakes up in a cabin in the middle of the woods, and soon discovers that she has been kidnapped by Clara, her teacher of language and literature.

The story rewinds to the past, when Fernanda and her group of friends discover an abandoned building next to a mangrove which houses a crocodile. Annelise Van Isschot, Fernanda's best friend, who is into creepypastas, pushes the group into visiting the building more often and they start indulging in peculiar practices. These acts, which were innocent at first, increasingly became wicked and terrorizing as Annelise introduces them to the group as the cult of "El Dios Blanco" ("The White God").

Clara joins the school where Fernanda and her friends study. She is affected by the thoughts of her lost mother and the trauma caused by an attack that she suffered months ago at the hands of two teenage girls. When she notices the cruel practices of Fernanda and Annelise, events unravel fast, which leads to Fernanda's abduction and what happens later forms the remaining of the plot.

== Critical reception ==
The novel received positive reviews after its publication. Spanish newspaper, El País, called it "one of the novels of the season", and placed it in the 12th place in its list of the 50 best books of 2018. The German network, Deutsche Welle, included it in its list of the ten most prominent Latin American books of the year. The cultural magazine, Arcadia, included it in its list of the 100 best books in Spanish written by women of the last 100 years.

Author Carlos Pardo, in a review published in the magazine Babelia, called it a "master novel", and praised its narrative, poetic language, and the richness of prose. Writer María Fernanda Ampuero applauded the novel and its author, stating it as a "song of perverse love to the mother-daughter relationship, friend-friend, teacher-student, woman-woman".

Juan Ángel Juristo, writing for the ABC newspaper, praised the work and called it one of the best thrillers he had read. He called the author, Mónica Ojeda, as "one of the greatest promises of the new generation of Latin American writers". Nadal Suau, from the weekly El Cultural, referred to the book as an "impeccable thriller". In magazine Eñe, David Pérez Vega praised the novel and said that it was a more mature and finished novel than Ojeda's previous novel, and that it positioned Ojeda as one of the voices of the new Latin American narrative.

== See also ==
- LGBTQ literature in Ecuador
