= María Luisa Bombal =

Chilean novelist and poet (1910–1980)

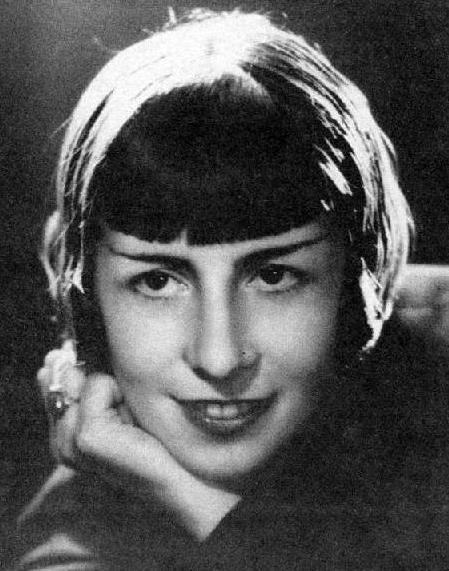
- Born: 8 June 1910; Viña del Mar, Chile
- Died: 6 May 1980 (aged 69); Santiago, Chile
- Education: University of Paris
- Occupation: Writer

María Luisa Bombal Anthes (Spanish pronunciation: [maˈɾi.a ˈlwisa βomˈβal]; Viña del Mar, 8 June 1910 – 6 May 1980) was a Chilean novelist and poet. Her work incorporates erotic, surrealist, and feminist themes. She was a recipient of the Santiago Municipal Literature Award. In 1938 she published her most famous novel The Shrouded Woman (Spanish: La amortajada).

== Biography ==
María Luisa was born in 1910 to Martín Bombal Videla and Blanca Anthes Precht.

As a child, Bombal attended the Catholic girls school Colegio de los Sagrados Corazones in Santiago. After her father's death in 1919, Bombal went with her mother and sisters to live in Paris, where she finished her studies at the Lycée privé Sainte-Geneviève. Bombal enrolled at the University of Paris, where she studied literature and philosophy. She also attended the Lycée La Bruyère and the Sorbonne, where she began to write. After Bombal completed her university studies, she returned to Chile in 1931, where she reunited with her family.

Bombal also studied violin with Jacques Thibaud and drama with Charles Dolan.

In 1938 Bombal published La amortajada, which earned her the Santiago Municipal Literature Award in 1941. While living in the United States, she wrote a novel in English, The House of Mist, which was a translation and extensive readaptation of her Spanish-language novel La última niebla. The House of Mist was later translated into Spanish by Lucía Guerra.

== Personal life ==
Upon her return to South America from Paris in 1931 she had an intense romance with a pioneer in civil aviation, Eulogio Sánchez Errázuriz (1903–1956), who did not share her interest in literature. Sánchez later distanced himself from Bombal, causing her to suffer from depression; after Sánchez stopped responding to her letters, she attempted suicide by shooting herself in the shoulder during a social gathering at his apartment. In 1933, she married the homosexual painter Jorge Larco (1897–1967), forming with him a lavender marriage. With the help of friends, Bombal fled the country to Argentina, where in 1933 she met Jorge Luis Borges and Pablo Neruda in Buenos Aires.

In 1937 she returned to Chile due to the beginning of a divorce hearing. In January 1941 she acquired a revolver, went to the Hotel Crillón in Santiago and waited for Eulogio Sánchez, who almost did not remember her after not seeing her for eight years. When Bombal saw him, she shot him three times in the arm. She went to trial; however, Sánchez exempted her from all guilt, for which the judge acquitted her. Years later Bombal said that he ruined her life; however, she never forgot him. Later on, she moved to the United States, where she married the French count Raphäel de Saint-Phalle y Chabannes (1889–1969), with whom she had a daughter, Brigitte. She returned to South America in 1971, living first in Argentina (helped by Pablo Neruda, who was also living there), where she met important men of letters, and then in Viña del Mar, Chile. There, on 18 September 1976, Bombal again met Jorge Luis Borges.

== Death ==
Bombal lived her final years in Chile. She became an alcoholic, which led to cirrhosis. Bombal died on May 6, 1980, in Santiago, as a result of gastrointestinal bleeding.

== About her work ==
Commonly, Bombal is depicted as an “ethereal and tragic woman, inclined toward the poetic and the sentimental.” However, this image overlooks the clearly rational and deliberate nature of her writing. As she herself asserted, her work was guided by “logic, precision, and symmetry.” She often quoted the seemingly paradoxical phrase of Pascal: “Geometry-Passion-Poetry.” Every time she referred to her writing, she insisted that it was organized around a logical axis and exact symmetrical forms, reinforcing her view of writing as a controlled and rational exercise.

Thus, María Luisa Bombal’s writing transcends the binary opposition between reality and unreality. The fundamental tension in her work arises from the unusual connection between mystery and logic. This "oxymoronic writing" as critics call it, reflects the paradox inherent in this union, where the rational and the emotional coexist in a delicate balance.

Early studies of La última niebla highlighted its uniqueness within the Chilean literary context, where criollismo, governed by a positivist worldview, predominated. Bombal, however, offered a profoundly different perspective, challenging the established norms.

In literary terms, María Luisa Bombal was a pioneer in daring to describe sexual acts openly, thereby transgressing the patriarchal discourse that had historically assigned women a passive and modest role. Her bravery in breaking these boundaries has earned her a prominent place in Latin American literature.

=== On Sex and the Feminine ===
Bombal's writing on sexual intercourse directly challenges the conventional representations found in criollo literature. In the latter, "the sexual act is seen as an assertion of male dominance over the woman … of ‘the woman' violently thrown to the ground or onto the bed, who silently and passively endures the virile onslaught." María Luisa, in contrast, "reconfigures the male character by designating him as ‘a sweet and precious burden,' a phrase that, within the criollo code, feminizes the man."

Similarly, depictions of the female body in the literature of the time revolved around a male perspective, with the woman being portrayed as "an object of Desire, a Venerated Icon, or a Perverse Idol." In Bombal's narratives, however, the female body is represented as "a new topography of the senses, intimately connected to all things cosmic." This marks a transgression against the symbolic model of "Duty-Being," epitomized by the Virgin Mary, a woman devoid of sexual pleasure. In La amortajada, this pleasure is presented as an initiating experience, marking the protagonist's path toward self-realization.

Within the patriarchal system, human sexuality has traditionally been interpreted and theorized from a male perspective, which typically proposes phallic penetration as the culminating event. Bombal subverts this view by exploring "narcissistic experiences, crafting discourses in which erotic pleasure becomes autonomy and the discovery of one's own body." Thus, the female body becomes a site of self-exploration, a "place of sensations" free from the constructions imposed by patriarchal hegemony. However, this space of agency remains limited. Only natural spaces "allow reintegration into cosmic harmony," while "the enclosed spaces of the house … impose rigid codes and social conventions that hinder a woman's possibility of being." As explained: "The opposition between open and closed spaces creates a tension that the female Self experiences when surrounded by images and models of a pre-determined identity. Consequently, this Self, confined to specific social roles, can only truly be in dreams and daydreams, in contact with water and all things primal."

The literary influences behind Bombal's symbolic repertoire include figures such as Gertrudis Gómez de Avellaneda, Soledad Acosta Samper, and Teresa de la Parra.

The aforementioned ideas form the basis of Bombal's symbolic world. First and foremost, the woman's hair is portrayed as a link to the primal, "connecting to an initial slime, destroyed by the civilizing impulse." The "lush hair" of Bombal's characters becomes "the last vestige of a Lost Paradise … lost to the imposition of an epistemology and practice grounded in reason as an organizing principle."

=== The female character in her work ===
“The romantic heroine is the precursor of the female characters found in the sentimental melodramas or feuilletons, whose discourse is incorporated by María Luisa Bombal in most of her texts. At the same time, she also includes the image of the vampire woman from 1920s and 1930s cinema”.

However, these images and archetypes that the author invokes in her writing do not fully encapsulate her female characters. There is an excess, a gap in their personalities that the mere gathering of desires and frustrations, typical of their gender, cannot describe. For instance, at the end of La última niebla, the protagonist attempts suicide, just as a romantic or melodramatic heroine might. However, she realizes that this is no longer possible. She says: “I am haunted by the vision of my naked body, stretched out on a morgue table. Wilted flesh clinging to a narrow skeleton, a sunken belly pressed against the hips… The suicide of an almost-old woman, how disgusting and futile.” Similarly, Ana María in La amortajada reflects: “Why keep fooling herself that, for a long time, she had been forcing herself to cry? It was true that she suffered, but no longer did the thought of her husband’s lack of love sadden her, nor did the idea of her own unhappiness soften her. A certain irritation and a dull resentment dried up her suffering, perverting it.”

=== The relationship with men ===
“The fundamental ideogram throughout María Luisa Bombal’s entire work [...] is the deep and irrevocable split between man and woman.” In the author's narratives, these human groups are “condemned to miscommunication and trapped in social roles defined by power relations.”

The concept of man, not only in Bombal’s work but also in the thought of Simone de Beauvoir and the early twentieth century in general, was delineated by the principles of Activity and Doing, which formed the core of his existence. In this light, Bombal recalls a thought from Yolanda, the protagonist of the short story Las Islas Nuevas: “How absurd men are! Always in motion, always ready to show interest in everything… If they come near the fireplace, they stand, ready to flee to the other side of the room, always ready to escape toward something trivial. And they cough, smoke, speak loudly, afraid of silence as if it were an enemy…”

In light of this, it is not surprising that her male characters lack defining traits. Stripped of their activity, Bombal sketches her male characters in a dismal light, presenting them as faceless figures that are reduced to mere "axes of conflict" seen through the perspective of the female characters.

=== Distinction between femininity and masculinity in her works ===
Bombal wrote distinctly for her male and female characters. Bombal viewed femininity as a symbol of uniqueness; more related to nature, emotions and intuition; very different from how she depicts masculinity, where men are described as stronger and wiser, at the moment of facing problems.

== Selected works ==
Novels

- La última niebla (1934)
- La amortajada (1938)
- The House of Mist (1947, English readaptation of La última niebla)
- The Shrouded Woman (1947, English readaptation of La amortajada)

Stories

- Las islas nuevas (1939)
- El árbol (1939)
- Trenzas (1940)
- Lo secreto (1944)
- La historia de María Griselda (1946)

Chronicles

- Mar, cielo y tierra (1940)
- Washington, ciudad de las ardillas (1943)
- La maja y el ruiseñor (1960)

Other writings

- Reseña cinematográfica de Puerta cerrada (1939)
- En Nueva York con Sherwood Anderson (entrevista) (1939)
- Inauguración del sello Pauta (1973)
- Discurso en la Academia Chilena de la Lengua (1977)
