= The Shrouded Woman =

1938 novel by María Luisa Bombal

- Title page for La amortajada (1941)
- Author: María Luisa Bombal
- Original title: La amortajada
- Translator: María Luisa Bombal
- Language: Spanish
- Publisher: Sur
- Publication date: 1938
- Publication place: Chile
- English publication date: 1947
- Media type: Print

The Shrouded Woman (Spanish: La amortajada) is a novel by Chilean writer María Luisa Bombal, published in 1938. The plot is heavily influenced by men's psychological submission to female figures. In terms of structure, this novel has a context that travels between reality and fiction, depending on what the author wants to communicate with Ana María, a dead woman who is the main character of the novel, and the memories of those who come to see her coffin. It is precisely this distance between the living and Ana María that determines the unusual way in which the book is fragmented.

It is considered an important novel in Chilean literature, both for its literary merits and for being a reflection of 1930s Chilean society. It was adapted for television by José Caviedes (director) and José Irarrázabal (screenplay) and broadcast by Televisión Nacional de Chile in 1971.

== Plot ==
The voice of the novel is that of a dead woman, lying in her coffin, dressed in her shroud; hence the title of the work.

The book begins with a description of Ana María's death from the narrator's perspective, then continues with the story from the protagonist's perspective. At the beginning, the narrator talks about how the protagonist looks and feels, emphasizing that she is filled with enormous joy. Then, the narrator tells us that people (important in Ana María's life) are watching her from outside the coffin.

== Translation ==
The novel was translated into English by the author herself and published in 1947 by Farrar, Straus and Giroux under the title The Shrouded Woman.

== Critical reception ==
María Luisa Bombal's work is considered by critics to be precursor of contemporary Chilean novels, due to her innovations, such as the fundamental role of criticism of women's roles in her works, internal monologues, dreamlike atmospheres, metaphorical language, and spatial-temporal ambiguity. The Chilean critic Mario Ferrero Mate de Luna said that Bombal "directly represented magical realism, with a very refined lyrical style, in her great prose works".

Kirkus Reviews magazine defined the novel as having "marked Latin lyricism", as well as having "an almost tormented exaltation", and added that all the personal entanglements described episodically in the novel are told "with a lack of restraint" that some readers "may find disturbing".

The novel was praised by Kelsey Guilfoil in the Chicago Tribune and Pauline Worthy in The News & Observer. It received a more mixed review from Martha Schlegel in The Philadelphia Inquirer.
