= Daniela Alcívar Bellolio =

Ecuadorian writer (born 1982)

- Daniela Alcívar Bellolio in 2022
- Born: March 3, 1982 (age 44); Guayaquil, Ecuador
- Education: University of Buenos Aires; Fundación Universidad del Cine
- Writing career
- Language: Spanish
- Genres: Novel, short story, essay
- Notable work: Siberia
- Notable awards: La Linares Short Novel Award; Joaquín Gallegos Lara National Fiction Prize

Daniela Alcívar Bellolio (born March 3, 1982) is an Ecuadorian author, editor, and literary critic.

== Literary career ==
After finishing her studies, Alcívar Bellolio moved to Buenos Aires, Argentina, where she started a second career at the Fundación Universidad del Cine. She later started studying for her master's degree in literature at the University of Buenos Aires, which she abandoned in favor of studying for her doctorate. During her college years, she published criticisms of books and films on her blog, titled El desprecio (literally "disdain" or "scorn").

Her first two books were the short story collection Para esta mañana diáfana ("For this clear morning") and the book of essays Pararrayos ("Lightning rods"), both published in 2016 and written during her stay in Buenos Aires. She lived in Argentina for 13 years. Upon returning to Ecuador, Alcívar Bellolio began to work as an editor for the independent newspaper Turbina.

In April 2018, she received an honorable mention in the La Linares Short Novel Award for her novel Siberia, sent to the contest under the pseudonym "Nela Martínez." The story focuses on an Ecuadorian migrant who must live with the grief provoked by abandoning her home country and the death of her child. In his decision, the judge said that:

Siberia shows a strong narrative voice; displays a language marked by precise and visual images, together with a profound ability to cause emotion that does not drift into sentimental shrillness.

The book won the Joaquín Gallegos Lara National Fiction Prize in the novel category.

In 2019, the Spanish company Candaya published a new edition of Siberia, in which Alcívar Bellolio included an additional section titled "One year later."

== Works ==
- Para esta mañana diáfana (2016), short stories
- Pararrayos (2016), essays
- Siberia (2018), novel
- Lo que fue el futuro (2022), novel
