= Pura sangre (film) =

Pura Sangre
- Directed by: Luis Ospina
- Written by: Luis Ospina; Alberto Quiroga
- Screenplay by: Luis Ospina
- Based on: Real events on 1960-1970
- Produced by: Luis Ospina; Rodrigo Castaño; Rocío Obregón
- Starring: Gilberto Forero; Carlos Mayolo; Florina Lemaitre; Humberto Arango; Luis Alberto García
- Cinematography: Ramón Suárez
- Music by: Bernardo Ossa; Gabriel Ossa¸ Enrique Gaviria
- Production companies: Producciones Luis Ospina; Icaic (Cuba)
- Distributed by: Focine
- Release dates: 1982 (Festival de cine de Cartagena); 11 May 1983 (Bogotá and other cities, Colombia)
- Running time: 105 minutes
- Country: Colombia
- Language: Spanish

Pura Sangre (Spanish: Pure blood) is a 1982 Colombian drama thriller horror film directed by Luis Ospina starring Gilberto Forero, Carlos Mayolo, Florina Lemaitre, Humberto Arango and Luis Alberto García. The film is based on true events about the 'Monster of the Mangones'; apparently Adolfo Aristizabal, a sadist, psychopath who murdered 30 children between the ages of 8 and 13 and an unsolved case in the Colombian justice system. They were mostly street dwellers or young people who walked near the Mangones; an area of Cali where there were unbuilt spaces and buildings are isolated from each other, making it easy to capture anyone in the dark of night. To this was added the myth that the person presumed responsible for these deaths was a wealthy man who suffered from leukemia and the appearance of him was dying and cadaverous. So, to survive, the alleged man would have hired people to kill young people and survive on his blood, either with transfusions or by drinking it.

Is considered a classic horror Colombian film, dedicated to Andrés Caicedo.

== Plot ==
The film opens with some people who have been murdered in a house, one of them apparently raped. The killer, named Perfecto, had taken crime photos of him and during the opening credits, reveals them.

The narrative moves to an airport where a charter lands and from the interior Roberto Hurtado, a wealthy but weak and ill old man, gets off, accompanied by his son, Adolfo, and Dr. Hughes, his family doctor. Hurtado is taken by ambulance to a luxurious penthouse by his drivers Perfecto and Ever, accompanied by Florencia, a nurse and their friend. At the office, Dr. Hughes explains to Adolfo that his father suffers from a rare blood disease which is poisoning him and has given him a monstrous appearance (which would alter his sanity) as well as Thrombocytopenic purpura. The only treatment is the constant transfusion of blood while it is young and healthy men.

The next day, Perfecto goes to get the blood to the blood bank, leaving Adolfo, his boss, in the car, and when he hears the news of the murder, he finds the photos revealed by Perfecto. Adolfo steals them and leaves the envelope on the hood of the car. Perfecto, that night, he realizes that Adolfo stole the photos the moment Ever and Florencia ask him to see them. Adolfo, after confirming the responsibility of the three employees in the murder, calls them pretending to be payday, but at the time of paying them, Adolfo indirectly blackmails his three employees; they must get the blood for their father in exchange for not revealing the photos that incriminated them in the murder. Perfect, Ever and Florencia argue about the blackmail they are now victims of, but Florencia barely convinces them to make money. In the penthouse, Adolfo informs his father Roberto about the commitments of the sugar mill they own and talks to his grandchildren by video. That same night, the three employees (Perfecto, Florencia and Ever) kidnap a shoeshine boy from the street, take him to a farm where they draw his blood and steal his few belongings, in this they find an information card about the flea, and the three decide to nickname Roberto Hurtado 'the flea' for living off blood. So then the corpse is abandoned in an almost wooded area. Florencia then arrives at the penthouse to give Roberto the stolen blood, gives him the treatments, reads him the economic sections of the newspaper and plays him movies on Betamax.

One night, the three employees go to a bar where they witness a singer, and Perfecto, who is homosexual, is interested in a boy who is at the bar. Ever follows him to the bathroom where she indirectly invites him to snort cocaine and to a supposed party where there will be more cocaine. The three of them, accompanied by two homosexuals, go to the farm where they consume liquor, cigarettes and cocaine and Florencia dopes the two homosexuals, making them believe that she injects them with heroin. Both are raped by Perfecto, his blood drawn by Florencia, and like the shoeshine, the two dead homosexuals are abandoned in a field.

During the Day of the Little Candles, Perfecto and Florencia are forced to look for more blood, because Roberto had vomited useless blood. Both try to kidnap a child by doping him with chloroform but he escapes. Then they try to kidnap a girl but when they see her gender, they abandon her on a street, then they kidnap a destitute child from whom they draw blood. One night Roberto sees ants in the coffee sugar, prophesying a strike at the mill. This prophecy turns out to be true when they call Adolfo to notify him of the strike; the cutters refuse to burn the excess cane. Roberto is unaware that his son Adolfo is doing business with a sugar smuggler named Poncho; the drivers of the sugar trucks would be unarmed, causing the smugglers of Poncho to steal the sugar to sell it to Venezuela. Panic reigns in Cali; the corpses are found. The population and the press speculate that they are victims of the 'Monster of the mangones', an alleged serial killer who rapes young men alone or with a gang, apparently wealthy and homosexual that traffics blood.

During Christmas Eve, a small tremor occurs, and once again Ever and Perfecto must go for more blood for Roberto. They kidnap another child and it is difficult to bring him up to transfer the blood to Roberto who, being doped, manages to see a bit of the origin of the blood. Adolfo's business with the smugglers is ruined because a driver was armed confronting the smugglers disguised as police, resulting in the capture of them by the real police and the seizure of the merchandise, despite being insured. Adolfo finds out about this and Poncho orders him to take action or there would be problems. Without saying anything to his father, Adolfo asks him for money to fix the problem, citing threats to the family, but Roberto, also aware of the assault flatly refuses. Roberto immediately deduces that Adolfo is behind a sugar smuggling business but Adolfo refutes him by demanding that he take command of the business while his father ignores everything including the origin of the blood that keeps him alive. Hearing this, Roberto remembers the boy whose blood was drawn, so he suffers a seizure and vomits blood. While Adolfo changes labels from a useless blood and a usable one, he goes to his office and burns various documents including the photos of the murder, takes a suicide pistol and falls on his fish tank.

Roberto dies after receiving the wrong blood and veiled the next day. During a weekend walk on the river bank; Perfecto, Ever and his family, and Florencia find out about the capture of the so-called 'Monster of the mangones'; Pedro Luis Mosquera alias 'Babalú' who confessed the crimes even to the press (archive footage). It is revealed that Adolfo did not die but suffered paralysis as a result of the shot to the temple, and a year later he recovers with few motor functions. The Hurtado family visits the grave of the late father and grandfather Roberto, being venerated and praised by various people, especially his employees.

== Cast ==
- Gilberto 'Fly' Forero - Roberto Hurtado, elderly sugar magnate who suffers from a blood disease making him look haggard.
- Carlos Mayolo - Perfecto, homosexual driver and murderer who rapes his victims before murdering them. He is haunted by photos of his murders.
- Florina Lemaitre - Florencia, nurse and the only female member of the trio, therefore an accomplice in the murders. She must get the blood for her boss.
- Humberto Arango - Ever, Adolfo's driver and also an accomplice in the crimes. He is married and has two children.
- Luis Alberto García - Adolfo Hurtado, corrupt son of Roberto. He runs the family business, blackmails his three employees (Ever, Florencia, and Perfecto) and runs a sugar smuggling business.
- Franky Linero - Poncho, Sugar smuggler and leader of a gang dedicated to smuggling sugar.
