= Luis Ospina =

Colombian film director (1949–2019)

Luis Alfonso Ospina Garcés
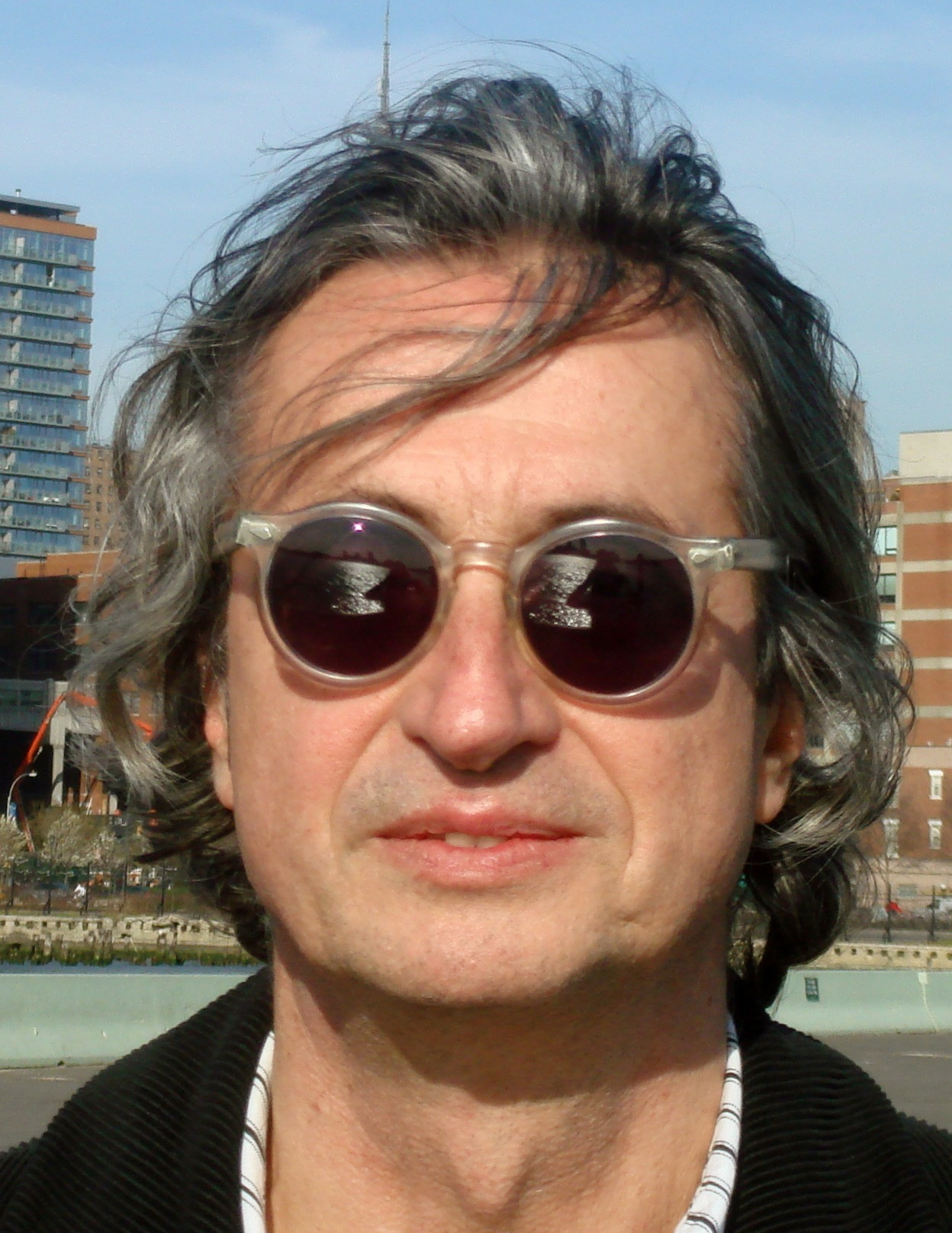
- Ospina in 2009
- Born: 1949; Cali, Colombia
- Died: November 27, 2019 (aged 69–70); Bogotá, Colombia
- Education: University of Southern California; University of California, Los Angeles (1972)

Luis Alfonso Ospina Garcés (1949 – November 27, 2019) was a Colombian film director.

== Biography ==
Ospina was born in Cali, Colombia in 1949. He grew up during La Violencia. As a child, Ospina became interested in horror films and Westerns.

Ospina studied film at the University of Southern California before attending the University of California, Los Angeles until 1972. He was involved in student movements against the Vietnam War. During trips back to Cali, he began making films with his childhood friend Carlos Mayolo. Their first short film Oiga, Vea! documented the lives of poor, predominantly Afro-Colombian residents during the 1971 Pan American Games.

Their 1977 film The Vampires of Poverty was a mockumentary satirizing the treatment of human subjects in documentary films.

Ospina's 1982 film Pure Blood was a gothic film about a sugarcane tycoon who blood transfusions from young boys. It was inspired by the Monster of the Mangones, an unidentified serial killer who operated in Ospina's hometown of Cali while he was growing up.

Ospina directed the 1999 neo-noir Breath of Life, co-written with his brother Sebastián. It stars Fernando Solórzano as a detective investigating the murder of a woman played by Flora Martínez.

== Death and legacy ==
Ospina died on September 27, 2019, in Bogotá. A documentary about his life, Ospina Cali Colombia, was released in 2023.
