= Carlos Mayolo =

Colombian actor & director (1945–2007)

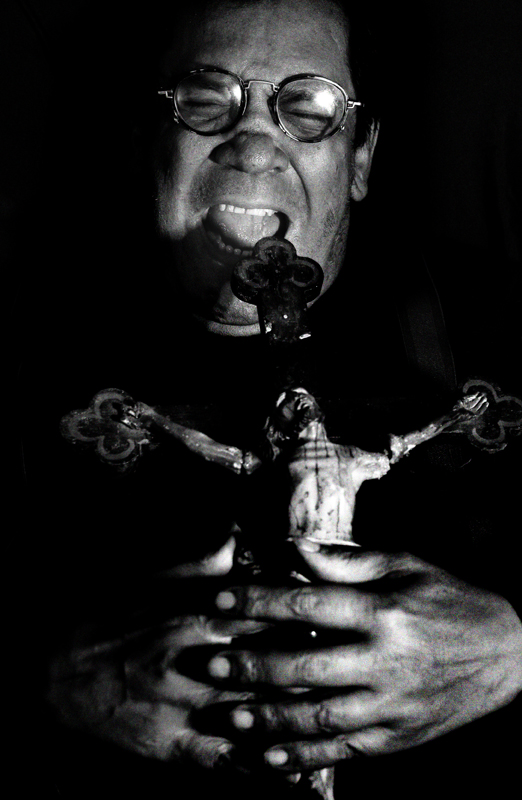
- Born: 10 September 1945; Cali, Colombia
- Died: 3 February 2007 (aged 61); Bogotá, Colombia
- Education: Universidad Santiago de Cali
- Occupation: Film director
- Years active: 1970-2000
- Awards: 1990 India Catalina Awards

Carlos Mayolo (10 September 1945 – 3 February 2007) was a Colombian actor and film director. He directed more than ten films from 1970 to 2000. The style of his films was defined by himself as "Tropical Gothic".

== Selected filmography ==
Films
Year	Title	Role	Notes
1968	Corrida		
1968	El Basuro		
1969	Quinta de Bolivar		
1971	Iglesia de San Ignacio		
1971	Monserrate		co-directed with Jorge Silva
1971	¡Oiga, Vea!		
1972	Cali on Film		
1975	Sin telón		
1975	Contamination Is...		
1976	Asunción		co-directed with Luis Ospina
1977	The Vampires of Poverty		co-directed with Luis Ospina
1983	Bloody Flesh		
1986	La Mansión de Araucaima		
