= List of Ecuadorian artists =

This article is a list of Ecuadorian artists.

- Alba Calderón (1908–1982, Guayaquil)
- Aníbal Villacís (born 1927, Ambato)
- Araceli Gilbert (1913–1993)
- Caesar Andrade Faini (born 1913, Quito)
- Camilo Egas (1889–1962)
- Cecile Chong (born 1964)
- Eduardo Kingman (1913–1998, Loja)
- Efraín Andrade Viteri (1920–1997, Esmeraldas)
- Enrique Tábara (born 1930, Guayaquil)
- Estuardo Maldonado (born 1930, Pintag)
- Félix Aráuz (born 1935, Guayaquil; died 2024)
- Galo Patricio Moncayo Asan (born 1975, Guayaquil)
- George Febres (1943–1996)
- Gilberto Almeida
- Gonzalo Endara Crow (1936–1996, Bucay)
- Hugo Cifuentes (1923–2000, Otavalo)
- Humberto Moré
- Isabel de Santiago (1666–ca. 1714, Quito)
- Isaac O. Moran (born 1947, Riobamba)
- Jaime Zapata
- Jorge Velarde (born 1960, Guayaquil)
- José Carreño (born 1947, Guayaquil)
- Juan Villafuerte (1945–1977, Guayaquil, Spain)
- Judith Gutiérrez (1927–2003, Babahoyo)
- Lady Pink (1964, Ambato)
- Luis Miranda (born 1932)
- Luis Molinari (born 1929, Guayaquil)
- Manuel Rendón Seminario (1894–1982, Paris, Portugal)
- Manuel de Samaniego (1767–1824, Quito)
- Marcelo Tejada (born 1952)
- Marcos Restrepo (born 1961, Catarama)
- Miguel Betancourt (born 1958, Quito)
- Oscar Santillan (born 1980, Milagro)
- Oswaldo Guayasamín (1919–1999, Quito)
- Oswaldo Moncayo (1923–1984, Riobamba)
- Oswaldo Viteri (1931–2023, Quito)
- Pilar Bustos (1945)
- Ramón Piaguaje
- Theo Constanté (born 1934, Guayaquil)
- Trude Sojka (1909–2007 Berlín, Quito)
- Víctor Mideiros (1888–1967)
- Xavier Blum Pinto (born 1957)

== See also ==
- List of Latin American artists
- List of Ecuadorians
