= List of modern artists =

This is a list of modern artists: important artists who have played a role in the history of modern art, dating from the late 19th century until (approximately) the 1970s. Artists who have been at the height of their activity since that date, can be found in the list of contemporary artists.

== A ==
- Nadir Afonso
- Yaacov Agam
- Ellinor Aiki
- Josef Albers
- Pierre Alechinsky
- Nathan Altman
- Irving Amen
- Constantine Andreou
- Karel Appel
- Félix Aráuz
- Alexander Archipenko
- Mino Argento
- Arman
- Jean Arp
- Art & Language
- David Ascalon
- Frank Auerbach
- Edward Avedisian
- Milton Avery
- Alice Aycock

== B ==
- Francis Bacon
- Giacomo Balla
- Balthus
- Vladimir Baranoff-Rossine
- Romare Bearden
- Max Beckmann
- George Bellows
- Thomas Hart Benton
- José Bernal
- Joseph Beuys
- Ralph Albert Blakelock
- Norman Bluhm
- Umberto Boccioni
- Alexander Bogomazov
- Pierre Bonnard
- Fernando Botero
- Louise Bourgeois
- Constantin Brâncuși
- Georges Braque
- Marcel Broodthaers
- James Brooks
- Joan Brown
- Daniel Buren
- David Burliuk
- Wladimir Burliuk

== C ==
- Paul Cadmus
- Alexander Calder
- Josef Čapek
- Norman Carlberg
- Emily Carr
- Carlo Carrà
- Clarence Holbrook Carter
- Mary Cassatt
- Carlos Catasse
- Elizabeth Catlett
- Vija Celmins
- Paul Cézanne
- Marc Chagall
- John Chamberlain
- Giorgio de Chirico
- Dan Christensen
- Chuck Close
- Charles Conder
- Theo Constanté
- William Copley
- Joseph Cornell
- Tony Cragg

== D ==
- Leon Dabo
- Salvador Dalí
- Gene Davis
- Ronald Davis
- Stuart Davis
- Lawrence Daws
- Michael J. Deas
- Edgar Degas
- Jay DeFeo
- Robert Delaunay
- Sonia Delaunay
- Charles Demuth
- André Derain
- Giorgio De Vincenzi
- Richard Diebenkorn
- Jim Dine
- Otto Dix
- Theo van Doesburg
- Jean Dubuffet
- Marcel Duchamp
- Elizabeth Durack
- Arthur Durston
- Friedel Dzubas

== E ==
- Aleksandra Ekster
- James Ensor
- Max Ernst
- M. C. Escher

== F ==
- Demetrios Farmakopoulos
- Paul Feeley
- Lyonel Feininger
- Pavel Filonov
- Sam Francis
- Jane Frank
- Helen Frankenthaler
- Lucian Freud
- Yitzhak Frenkel Frenel
- Fang Ganmin
- Wilhelmina Weber Furlong

== G ==
- Naum Gabo
- Joaquín Torres García
- Enrico Garff
- Paul Gauguin
- Ilka Gedő
- Nina Genke-Meller
- Gunther Gerzso
- Alberto Giacometti
- Sam Gilliam
- William Glackens
- Vincent van Gogh
- Elias Goldberg
- Michael Goldberg
- Natalia Goncharova
- Robert Goodnough
- Arshile Gorky
- Józef Gosławski
- Adolph Gottlieb
- Nancy Graves
- Cleve Gray
- Balcomb Greene
- Stephen Greene
- Juan Gris
- Red Grooms
- George Grosz
- Oswaldo Guayasamín
- İsmet Güney
- Philip Guston

== H ==
- Elaine Hamilton
- Richard Hamilton
- Duane Hanson
- Grace Hartigan
- Raoul Hausmann
- Michael Heizer
- Patrick Hennessy
- Barbara Hepworth
- Patrick Heron
- Eva Hesse
- Charles Hinman
- Hannah Höch
- David Hockney
- Howard Hodgkin
- Frances Hodgkins
- Hans Hofmann
- Edward Hopper
- Istvan Horkay
- Ralph Hotere
- John Hoyland
- Friedensreich Hundertwasser

== I ==
- René Iché
- Leiko Ikemura
- Robert Indiana

== J ==
- Augustus John
- Jasper Johns
- Ray Johnson
- Joan Jonas
- Asger Jorn
- Donald Judd

== K ==
- Frida Kahlo
- Wolf Kahn
- Wassily Kandinsky
- Ellsworth Kelly
- Ernst Ludwig Kirchner
- Paul Klee
- Gustav Klimt
- Yves Klein
- Franz Kline
- Hilma af Klint
- Ivan Kliun
- Oskar Kokoschka
- Willem de Kooning
- Albert Kotin
- Lee Krasner
- Nicholas Krushenick
- František Kupka
- Kyung-hee Hong

== L ==
- Wifredo Lam
- Ronnie Landfield
- John Latham
- Jacob Lawrence
- Fernand Léger
- Alfred Leslie
- Sol LeWitt
- Roy Lichtenstein
- Richard Lippold
- Charles Logasa
- Elfriede Lohse-Wächtler
- Morris Louis
- Lin Fengmian

== M ==
- Stanton Macdonald-Wright
- August Macke
- Konrad Mägi
- René Magritte
- Aristide Maillol
- Kasimir Malevich
- Édouard Manet
- Robert Mangold
- Totte Mannes
- Piero Manzoni
- Franz Marc
- Conrad Marca-Relli
- Brice Marden
- Bruce McLean
- John Marin
- Marino Marini
- Chris Marker
- Agnes Martin
- Eugene J. Martin
- Knox Martin
- André Masson
- Henri Matisse
- Roberto Matta
- Gordon Matta-Clark
- Mikuláš Medek
- Vadim Meller
- Ana Mendieta
- Carlos Mérida
- Mario Merz
- Manolo Millares
- Joan Miró
- Joan Mitchell
- Stanley Matthew Mitruk
- Amedeo Modigliani
- László Moholy-Nagy
- Luis Molinari
- Piet Mondrian
- Claude Monet
- Henry Moore
- Giorgio Morandi
- Gustave Moreau
- Robert Motherwell
- Alfons Mucha
- Edvard Munch

== N ==
- Bruce Nauman
- Manuel Neri
- G. P. Nerli
- Louise Nevelson
- Neith Nevelson
- Roy Newell
- Barnett Newman
- Alexander Ney
- Jan Nieuwenhuys
- Solomon Nikritin
- Isamu Noguchi
- Kenneth Noland
- Emil Nolde

== O ==
- Brian O'Doherty
- Georgia O'Keeffe
- Claes Oldenburg
- Jules Olitski
- Nathan Oliveira
- Yoko Ono

== P ==
- Nam June Paik
- Niki de Saint Phalle
- Eduardo Paolozzi
- David Park
- Ray Parker
- Waldo Peirce
- I. Rice Pereira
- Francis Picabia
- Pablo Picasso
- Jackson Pollock
- Larry Poons
- Liubov Popova
- Fuller Potter
- Richard Pousette-Dart

== R ==
- Sughra Rababi
- Robert Rauschenberg
- Man Ray
- Kliment Red'ko
- Peter Reginato
- Ad Reinhardt
- Manuel Rendón
- Pierre-Auguste Renoir
- Bohuslav Reynek
- Gerhard Richter
- Bridget Riley
- Diego Rivera
- Manuel Rivera
- Alexander Rodchenko
- Auguste Rodin
- Nicholas Roerich
- Olga Rozanova
- James Rosenquist
- Mark Rothko
- Susan Rothenberg
- Henri Rousseau
- Edward Ruscha
- Albert Pinkham Ryder

== S ==
- Egon Schiele
- Oskar Schlemmer
- Kurt Schwitters
- George Segal
- André Dunoyer de Segonzac
- Richard Serra
- Pablo Serrano
- Georges-Pierre Seurat
- Ben Shahn
- Charles Sheeler
- Sally Sheinman
- Harry Shoulberg
- Paul Signac
- Josef Šíma
- David Simpson
- David Smith
- Tony Smith
- Robert Smithson
- Joan Snyder
- Chaïm Soutine
- Václav Špála
- Austin Osman Spare
- Nicolas de Staël
- Theodoros Stamos
- Frank Stella
- Joseph Stella
- Hedda Sterne
- Clyfford Still
- Gjura Stojana
- Jindřich Štyrský
- Graham Sutherland
- Patrick Swift

== T ==
- Tarsila do Amaral
- Enrique Tábara
- Atsuko Tanaka
- Dorothea Tanning
- Antoni Tàpies
- Vladimir Tatlin
- Paul Thek
- Wayne Thiebaud
- William Tillyer
- Jean Tinguely
- Alton Tobey
- Mark Tobey
- Bradley Walker Tomlin
- Toyen
- Richard Tuttle
- Cy Twombly

== U ==
- Nadezhda Udaltsova

== V ==
- Victor Vasarely
- Vladimír Vašíček
- Kuno Veeber
- Aníbal Villacís
- Juan Villafuerte
- Keratza Vissulceva
- Oswaldo Viteri
- Maurice de Vlaminck
- Marc Vaux
- Wolf Vostell
- Édouard Vuillard

== W ==
- Andy Warhol
- Ilse Weber
- Tom Wesselmann
- Jan de Weryha-Wysoczanski
- James Abbott McNeill Whistler
- Thornton Willis
- Isaac Witkin
- Grant Wood
- Andrew Wyeth

== X ==
- Xul Solar

== Y ==
- Taro Yamamoto
- Peter Young

== Z ==
- Jean Zaleski
- Larry Zox
- Jan Zrzavý

== See also ==
- Art
- List of painters
- List of contemporary artists
- Modernist project
