= Luis Adolfo Noboa Naranjo Museum =

Coordinates: 02°11′27″S 79°52′52″W

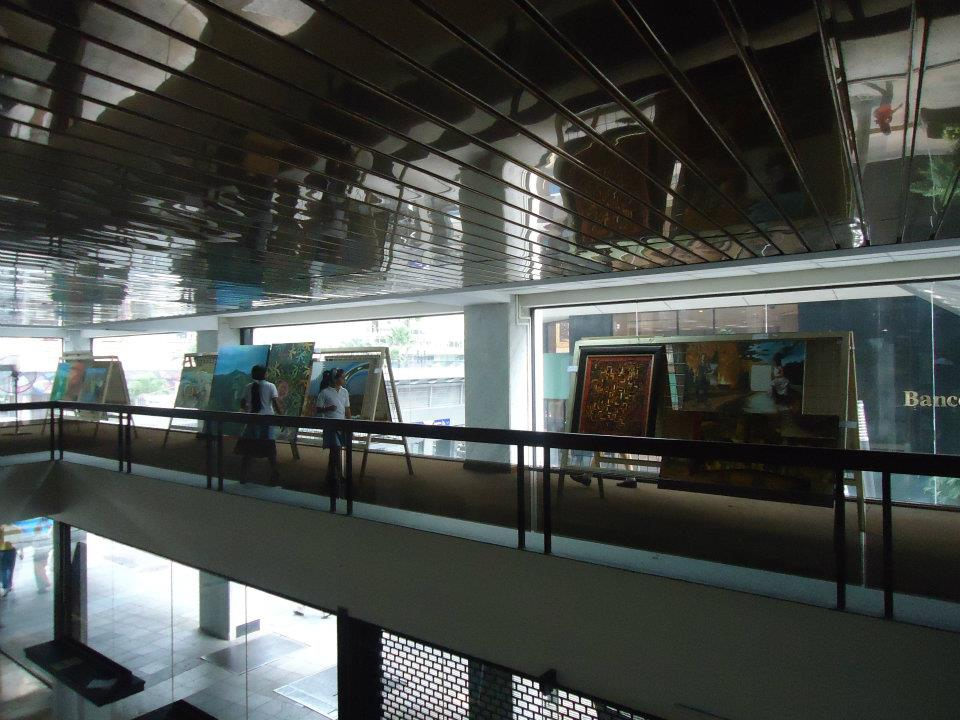
Luis Adolfo Noboa Naranjo Museum

Luis Adolfo Noboa Naranjo Museum (Spanish: Museo Luis Adolfo Noboa Naranjo) is a museum in Guayaquil, Ecuador. It was established on January 25, 2006, by Alvaro Noboa. It displays the private collection of paintings of the late Ecuadorian entrepreneur, Luis Noboa Naranjo, representing a sample of the most important contemporary Ecuadorian painters, with whom he had cultivated friendship. The museum consists of 10 halls with 97 pieces of art, with a particular focus on avant-garde, including three murals by Manuel Rendón, and the paintings of Oswaldo Guayasamín, Eduardo Kingman, Humberto Moré, Carlos Catasse, Ricardo Montesinos, Segundo Espinel, Luis Miranda, Oswaldo Viteri and others. The museum offers guided programs for schools and colleges through city tours, permanent public displays, temporary exhibitions, and painting competitions.
