= List of painters by name beginning with "V" =

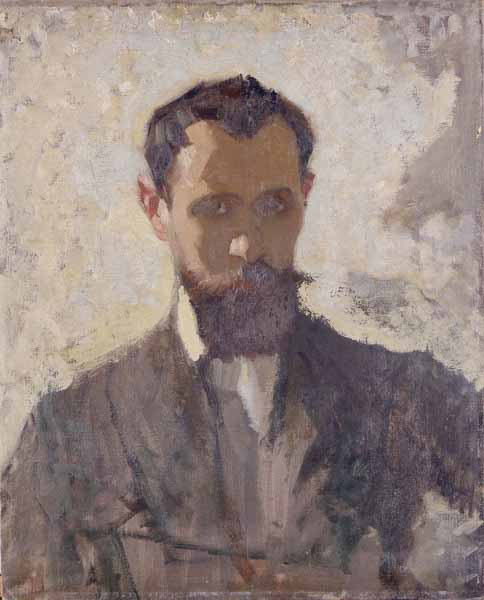
Pierre Adolphe Valette

Please add names of notable painters with a Wikipedia page, in precise English alphabetical order, using U.S. spelling conventions. Country and regional names refer to where painters worked for long periods, not to personal allegiances.

- Perin del Vaga (1499–1547), Italian painter and draftsman
- Aramenta Dianthe Vail (1820–1888), American painter
- Lajos Vajda (1908–1941), Hungarian painter
- Suzanne Valadon (1865–1938), French painter and model
- Víctor Manuel García Valdés (1897–1967), Cuban painter
- János Valentiny (1842–1902), Hungarian painter
- Nina Petrovna Valetova (born 1958), Soviet/American painter
- Pierre Adolphe Valette (1876–1942), French painter
- Leo Valledor (1936–1989), American painter
- Félix Vallotton (1865–1925), Swiss/French painter and print-maker
- Louis Valtat (1869–1952), French painter and print-maker
- Anthony van Dyck (1599–1641), Flemish/English court painter
- Vincent van Gogh (1853–1890), Dutch painter
- Maksimilijan Vanka (1889–1963), Austro-Hungarian (Croatian)/American artist
- Bernard van Orley (between 1487 and 1491–1541), Flemish artist and designer
- Raja Ravi Varma (1848–1906), Indian painter and lithographer
- Kazys Varnelis (1917–2010), Lithuanian/American abstract painter.
- Remedios Varo (1908–1963), Spanish/Mexican artist
- Victor Vasarely (1908–1997), Hungarian/French artist
- Vladimír Vašíček (1919–2003), Czechoslovak/Czech painter
- Fyodor Vasilyev (1850–1873), Russian painter
- Apollinary Vasnetsov (1856–1933), Russian painter and graphic artist
- Viktor Vasnetsov (1848–1926), Russian artist
- Marie Vassilieff (1884–1957), Russian/French artist
- György Vastagh (1834–1922) Hungarian painter
- Serhii Vasylkivsky (1854–1917), Russian (Ukrainian) artist
- János Vaszary (1867–1938), Hungarian painter
- Gee Vaucher (born 1945), English visual artist
- Alonso Vázquez (1565 – c. 1608), Spanish sculptor and painter
- Philipp Veit (1793–1877), German painter and fresco artist
- Verónica Ruiz de Velasco, (born 1968), Mexican/American painter
- Diego Velázquez (1599–1660), Spanish royal painter
- Jorge Velarde (born 1960), Ecuadorian painter
- Adriaen van de Velde (1636–1672), Dutch painter
- Esaias van de Velde (1587–1630), Dutch painter
- Henry van de Velde (1863–1957), Belgian painter, architect and theorist
- Willem van de Velde the Elder (1611–1693), Dutch painter
- Willem van de Velde the Younger (1633–1707), Dutch painter
- Petrus Van der Velden (1837–1913), Dutch/New Zealand artist
- Alexey Venetsianov (1780–1847), Russian painter
- Adriaen van de Venne (1589–1662), Dutch painter
- Cornelis Verbeeck (1590–1637), Dutch painter
- Dionisio Baixeras Verdaguer (1862–1943), Spanish painter
- Louis Mathieu Verdilhan (1875–1928), French painter and decorative artist
- Vasily Vereshchagin (1842–1904), Russian artist
- Fernand Verhaegen (1883–1975), Belgian painter and etcher
- Jan Verkolje (1650–1693), Dutch painter, draftsman and engraver
- Johannes Vermeer (1632–1675), Dutch painter
- Frederik Vermehren (1823–1910), Danish painter
- Jan Cornelisz Vermeyen (1500–1559), Dutch painter
- Horace Vernet (1789–1863), French painter
- Paolo Veronese (1528–1588), Italian painter
- Andrea del Verrocchio (c. 1435 – 1488), Italian painter, sculptor and goldsmith
- Johannes Cornelisz Verspronck (1600–1662), Dutch painter
- Jan Victors (1619–1676), Dutch painter
- Joseph-Marie Vien (1716–1809), French royal painter
- Maria Helena Vieira da Silva (1908–1992), Portuguese painter
- Egon von Vietinghoff (1903–1994), Swiss painter, author and philosopher
- Aníbal Villacís (1927–2012), Ecuadorian painter
- Juan Villafuerte (1945–1977), Ecuadorian painter
- Jacques Villon (1875–1963), French painter and print-maker
- Romano Vio (1913–1984), Italian sculptor
- Eliseu Visconti (1866–1944), Brazilian painter
- Ivan Yakovlevich Vishnyakov (1699–1761), Russian painter and muralist
- Claes Jansz. Visscher (1587–1652), Dutch draftsman, engraver and cartographer
- Keraca Visulčeva (1911–2004), Ottoman/Bulgarian artist and teacher
- Oswaldo Viteri (1931–2023), Ecuadorian artist
- Bartolomeo Vivarini (c. 1432 – c. 1499), Italian painter
- Boris Vladimirski (1878–1950), Russian/Soviet painter
- Maurice de Vlaminck (1876–1958), French painter
- Simon de Vlieger (1601–1653), Dutch painter, designer and draftsman
- Hendrick Cornelisz. van Vliet (1612–1675), Dutch painter and interior designer
- Willem van der Vliet (1584–1642), Dutch painter
- Zygmunt Vogel (1764–1826), Polish painter, illustrator and educator
- Karl Völker (1889–1962), German painter and architect
- Alfredo Volpi (1896–1988), Brazilian painter
- Robert William Vonnoh (1858–1933), American painter
- Clark Voorhees (1871–1933), American painter
- Lucas Vorsterman (1595–1675), Dutch/Netherlandish engraver
- Wolf Vostell (1932–1998), German painter and sculptor
- Simon Vouet (1590–1649), French painter
- Sebastian Vrancx (1573–1647), Flemish painter and draftsman
- Abraham de Vries (1590–1662), Dutch painter
- Roelof van Vries (1630–1681), Dutch painter
- Cornelisz Hendriksz Vroom, the Younger (1591–1661), Dutch painter
- Hendrick Cornelisz Vroom (1566–1640), Dutch painter
- Mikhail Vrubel (1856–1910), Russian painter, sculptor and graphic artist
- Édouard Vuillard (1868–1940), French painter, decorative artist and print-maker
- Beta Vukanović (1872–1972), Serbian painter
