= Juan Villafuerte =

Ecuadorian artist (1945–1977)

- Villafuerte's, Autoretrato, oil on canvas
- Born: Juan Antonio Villafuerte Estrada; July 19, 1945; Guayaquil, Ecuador
- Died: August 15, 1977 (aged 32); Barcelona, Spain
- Resting place: General Cemetery of Guayaquil
- Education: School of Fine Arts, Guayaquil; School of Fine Arts, Barcelona
- Known for: Painting, drawing, engraving
- Notable work: Casa Antigua (1967); Vietnam (1970); Curas y Saldados (1972)
- Style: Neo-figurativism
- Movement: Informalism
- Spouse: Aracelli Molina
- Parents: Manuel Villafuerte (father); Rosa Estrada (mother)

Juan Villafuerte (July 19, 1945 – August 15, 1977) (Juan Antonio Villafuerte Estrada) was an artist known for his transmutated drawings and paintings. Villafuerte is among the ranks of other prominent Latin American painters such as Eduardo Kingman, Enrique Tábara, Aníbal Villacís, Félix Aráuz, Oswaldo Guayasamín, Judith Gutierrez, Hernan Zuniga and Jose Carreño.

Villafuerte was born on July 19, 1945, in Guayaquil, Ecuador to Manuel Villafuerte and Rosa Estrada. Juan was the youngest of four brothers, Manuel, and two sisters, Nila and Vilma. Nila was 13 when Juan was born. Nila later went on to marry Félix Aráuz.

Villafuerte's, Casa Antigua, oil on canvas, 1967.

In 1960, Villafuerte attended the School of Fine Arts in Guayaquil and was mentored by Theo Constanté, Hans Michelson and Caesar Andrade Faini. In 1964, Villafuerte and Hernan Zuniga moved to the factory of Juan Manuel Guano to work and live the Boehemian life of an artist. Villafuerte left the school in 1966 and began drawing from nature. Although Villafuerte did not follow in their footsteps he was greatly inspired by Gilberto Almeida and Enrique Tábara's Pre-Columbian inspired paintings. After graduation, Villafuerte participated in numerous Collective Exhibitions at the House of Culture, Nucleus of the Guayas, and the Museum of Colonial Art.

Villafuerte's first solo exhibit in Guayaquil was held at the North American Ecuadorian Center. The exhibit catalogue and invitations contained extremely enthusiastic commentaries of Villafuerte's work by such writers as, Bolivar Moyano and Diego Oguendo, among other pens. In the newspaper, the art critic, Manuel Esteban Mejía, spoke of Villafuerte's work at the exhibit saying, "It is not complacent, or made to please, but to trouble. It outlines deformities". Other articles spoke of the works as being at the core of the humanist philosophy. In 1967, Villafuerte presented an exhibit called Personal Muestra at the Galleria Arte de Quito that consisted of his first series of Vietnam images. The Vietnam Series lasted until 1973 when the war ended. In his Vietnam Series, Villafuerte would finish a drawing and rip it up into pieces and fix them to fine cardboard, then he would continue drawing and add in various newspaper and magazine clippings of the war. In 1968, Villafuerte exhibited with the group, VAN, at The Museum of Colonial Art in Quito. VAN was a group of modern Informalist artists that primarily consisted of Enrique Tábara, Aníbal Villacís, Estuardo Maldonado, Luis Molinari and Gilberto Almeida, who were in a constant search for a new modern aesthetic derived from Pre-Columbian art.

Villafuerte left Ecuador in 1968 to study engraving, drawing, and painting at the School of Beautiful Arts in Barcelona. During his study in Barcelona, Villafuerte became fascinated with the works of Rembrandt, Durero, and Goya, as well as the intense work of Antonio Saura. The definitive irruption of the Neo-figurativism happened at the beginning of the 1970s, where Jose Carreño and Villafuerte represented Spain and Ecuador.

The early Seventies saw the emergence of Villafuerte's, Transmutations Series of drawings, which consisted of exploding heads, monstrous creatures, figures of half women and half birds with multiple mouths and protruding veins. During this time, Villafuerte held many exhibits with the likes of Zuniga, Carreño and Yaulema all across Spain and Ecuador. Villafuerte was a very hard worker and was known to spend at least 16 hours a day drawing. He was also known to spend hours drawing satirical cartoons, often depicting the impoverished struggles of Latin Americans. One of his many important works is "Curas y Saldados" (1972), which shows the maturity of his drawing and the nerve of the color.

Villafuerte's, Vietnam, oil on canvas, 1970.

Villafuerte died of cancer on August 15, 1977, while living in Barcelona. He left a great deal of master works behind thanks to his hard working nature. Much of his work was left to the family in Ecuador; However, there is still a large body of work that remains in Spain with his widow, Aracelli Molina, as well as various galleries and collections throughout Spain and Ecuador.

One incident that was widely publicized in both Spain and Ecuador was the brief loss of the corpse of Villafuerte. After Villafuerte passed in Spain, his father and Nila flew to Spain to bring the body home. When they arrived back in Guayaquil there was a large crowd gathered to pay respects, but when the plane was unloaded there was no corpse. It was later discovered that the corpse had accidentally been sent to Lima, Peru. Once the body was located it was sent back to Guayaquil where it was held under guard for a short period of time at the House of Ecuadorian Culture. Villafuerte was finally laid to rest at the General Cemetery in Guayaquil.

Villafuerte took drawing to all possibilities of the imagination, with the highest level of skill. In 1979, the first retrospective to honor the work of Villafuerte was held at the Centennial Gallery of Guayaquil and since then his legacy has continued to grow and has secured his place among the great Latin American masters of the 20th Century.
