= Manuel Rendón Seminario =

French painter

- Born: 1894; Paris, France
- Died: 1980 (aged 85–86); Vila Viçosa, Portugal
- Education: Académie de la Grande Chaumière
- Known for: Painting
- Movement: Constructivism

Manuel Rendón Seminario (b. Paris, 1894 - d. Portugal, Vila Viçosa 1980) (Also known by Manuel Rendón) was a Latin American painter credited with bringing the Constructivist Movement to Ecuador and Latin America together with Joaquín Torres García who brought the Constructivist Movement to his home country of Uruguay. The Constructivist Movement was started in Russia by Vladimir Tatlin around 1913.

Rendón studied at the Académie of the Grand Chaumière in Paris, however, he resisted formal art training centers and instead preferred a solitary, assiduous, and tenacious work destiny. At an early age Rendon's work was regularly exhibited in the Paris Halls. Although Rendón was born in Paris, he is the son of Ecuadorian parents and is often considered an Ecuadorian artist who lived the majority of his life in Ecuador. Rendon's father, Víctor Manuel Rendón, acted as an ambassador in Paris.

Early in his career, Rendón lived the Boehemian life of a Parisian artist struggling to earn money. Rendón would sell small works made out of copper in order to make money to paint. In 1937, Rendón exhibited in Guayaquil, Ecuador and in Quito in 1939. These exhibits had an enormous impact on the great masters living in these cities at the time. The works were modern and abstract in nature. Rendón preached, "the task of the painter is to organize the possibilities that are offered to him." The work of Manuel Rendón is vast and has greatly influenced generations of master artists throughout Latin America and Europe, such as Antoni Tàpies, Antonio Saura, Enrique Tábara, Estuardo Maldonado, Carlos Catasse, Félix Aráuz, Aníbal Villacís, Oswaldo Viteri and Theo Constanté, to name a few.
