= Estuardo Maldonado =

Ecuadorian sculptor and painter (1928–2023)

- Born: 1928; Píntag, Quito District, Ecuador
- Died: 2023 (aged 94–95); Quito, Ecuador
- Education: School of Fine Arts in Guayaquil; Accademia di Belle Arti di Roma; Accademia di San Giacomo
- Known for: Painting, sculpture
- Movement: Constructivism

Estuardo Maldonado (1928–2023) was an Ecuadorian sculptor and painter inspired by the Constructivist movement. Maldonado was a member of VAN (Vanguardia Artística Nacional), the group of Informalist painters founded by Enrique Tábara. Other members of VAN included, Aníbal Villacís, Luis Molinari, Hugo Cifuentes, León Ricaurte and Gilberto Almeida. Maldonado's international presence is largely due to his participation in over a hundred exhibits outside of Ecuador.

== Biography ==
El Campo de Los Toros, pastel and ink on paper, 1960.

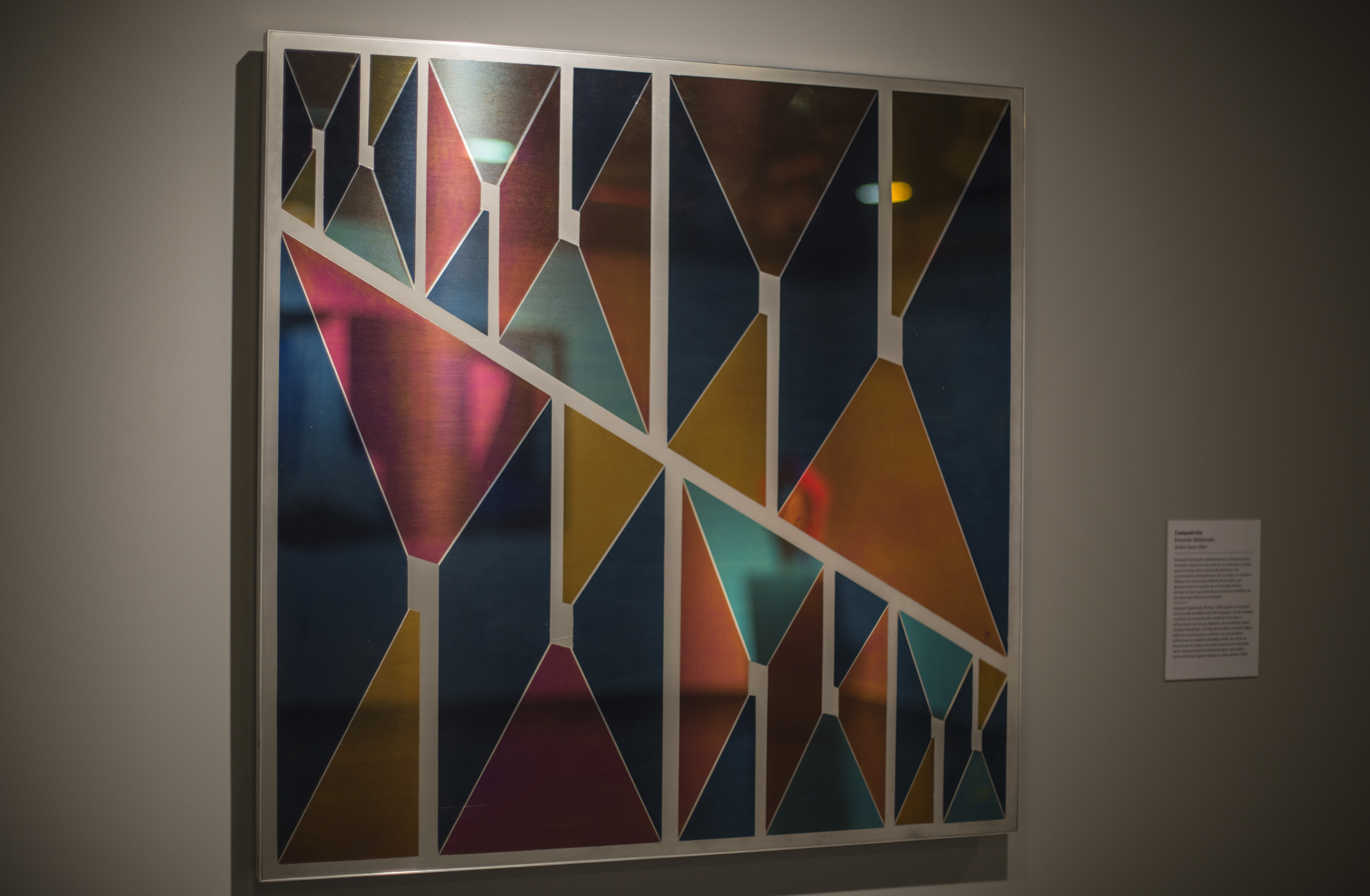
Composición, stainless steel panel, 1976.

Born in Píntag, in the Quito district of Ecuador, Maldonado left home at a young age in order to observe and learn from nature. Both nature and Indigenous themes have been a fundamental inspiration for much of his work. Maldonado studied art at the School of Fine Arts in Guayaquil. By 1953, Maldonado was teaching drawing and art history at the American School of Guayaquil. In 1955, Maldonado traveled the Ecuadorian coast painting the people of the coast and landscapes.

In 1955, Maldonado held his first exhibitions in Guayaquil, Portoviejo, and Esmeraldas. In 1956, Benjamin Carrion invited Maldonado to exhibit at the House of Ecuadorian Culture making him the first Ecuadorian artist to exhibit sculpture in Quito and Guayaquil. In 1957, Maldonado set out for Europe on a scholarship and traveled to France, Germany, Switzerland and the Netherlands and settled in Rome, Italy. Maldonado attended the Academy of Fine Arts of Rome and the Academy of San Giacomo.

Maldonado's work depicts abstractions of nature. His ancestral roots are also evident in some of his works based on pre-Columbian imagery from his native Andean zone. At the same time, he is interested in the palpitation of the evolving Universe. It is because of this inherent curiosity with advancement and history that he has a place within the Latin American Constructivist art movement.

Vladimir Tatlin founded constructivism in Russia in 1913. Influenced by Futurism and Cubism, this movement is based on abstract, geometric forms and is related to architectural ideas. The Constructivist movement made its way into Latin America by way of Joaquín Torres García and Manuel Rendón. Universal Constructivism is an innovative style created by Joaquín Torres García who after living in Europe for over forty years, returned to his native land, Uruguay and brought with him new artistic concepts. Universal Constructivism combines references to the pre-Columbian world with the geometric forms of European constructivism.

Maldonado's work has been celebrated throughout the world for successfully combining nature with innovation while addressing the relationship to his Andean roots.

In 2009, Maldonado was awarded the Premio Eugenio Espejo, his country's most prestigious National Award for Art, Literature and Culture presented by the President of Ecuador.

Maldonado died in Quito in 2023.

== Museums and exhibitions ==
- 1956 - House of Ecuadorian Culture, Guayaquil, Ecuador
- 1964 - Biennial of Venice, Venice, Italy
- 1974 - Center for the International Studies of Constructivist Art, Bonn, Germany
- 1974 - Marcon IV Gallery, Rome, Italy
- 1977 - Abstract Currents in Ecuadorian Art: Paintings by: Gilbert, Rendón, Tábara, Villacís, Molinari and Maldonado. Center for Inter-American Relations, New York, New York, U.S.
- 1985 - First Latin American Symposium of Sculpture of Santo Domingo, Dominican Republic
- 1985 - Art Museum of the Americas, Organization of American States (OAS), Washington, D.C.
- 1986 - Ecuadorian Embassy, Port-au-Prince, Haiti
- 1987 - I Biennial International Painting of Cuenca, Cuenca, Ecuador
- 1987 - Museum of Contemporary Hispanic Art (MoCHA), New York
- 1988 - XX Biennial of São Paulo, São Paulo, Brazil
- 1991 - Masters of Latin America, Nagoya, Japan
- 1994 - Gallery of Nadar Art, Dominican Republic
- 1998 - Museum of Italian Art, Lima, Peru
- 2000 - Pontifica Catholic University of Ecuador
- 2000 - Museum of Modern Art, Santiago, Chile
- 2000 - Exhibition, Perth, Western Australia
- 2001 - Exposición Centro Cultural Metropolitano de Quito, Ecuador.
- 2002 - Antología"1945-2002", Pontificia Universidad Católica de Ecuador.
- 2002 - Sala Municipal de Exposiciones de Valencia. L'Almudí.Valencia, Spain
- 2003 - Museo Luis Gonzalez Robles Alcalá de Henares. Madrid, Spain
- 2004 - Banco Central del Ecuador. Quito, Ecuador.
- 2004 - Galería Arte Jorge Ontiveros. Madrid, Spain
- 2004 - Sala Ayuntamiento L'Olleria. ValenciaSpain
- 2005 - Exposición en Chicago. Galería Aldo Castillo.
- 2005 - Fundación Jaume II el Just. Real Monasterio Santa Maria Valldigna. Generalitat Valenciana (Simat de Valldigna).
- 2005 - Sala Exposiciones Ayuntamiento de Elche. Alicante. España
- 2005 - Aldo Castillo Gallery, Chicago USA
- 2006 - The Katzen Art Center at American University, Washington, D.C., USA
- 2006 - Sala Autoral, Estuardo Maldonado, Museo Antropologico y de Arte Contemporaneo (MAAC), Guayaquil, Ecuador.
- 2007 - Galeria de Arte "CosmoArte Siglo XXV". Alicante, Spain
- 2008 - Ministry of Foreign Trade and Integration - Ecuadorian Embassy in Germany, Berlin, Germany.
- 2008 - ArtMadrid. Madrid. España
- 2008 - Sala de Exposiciones Parque de atracciones "Terra Mitica" . Benidorm. Alicante, Spain
- 2008 - Expo Zaragoza 2008. Pabellón de las Artes de Telefónica. Zaragoza, Spain

== Sources ==
- Barnitz, Jacqueline, Twentieth-Century Art of Latin America. University of Texas Press; Austin, Texas, 2001.
- Salvat, Arte Contemporáneo de Ecuado'. Salvat Editores Ecuatoriana, S.A., Quito, Ecuador, 1977.
- Sullivan, Edward J., Latin American Art in the Twentieth Century. Phaidon Press Limited; London, 1996.
