= Museo Antropologico y de Arte Contemporaneo =

Museum in Ecuador

Coordinates: 2°11′08.11″S 79°52′33.79″W

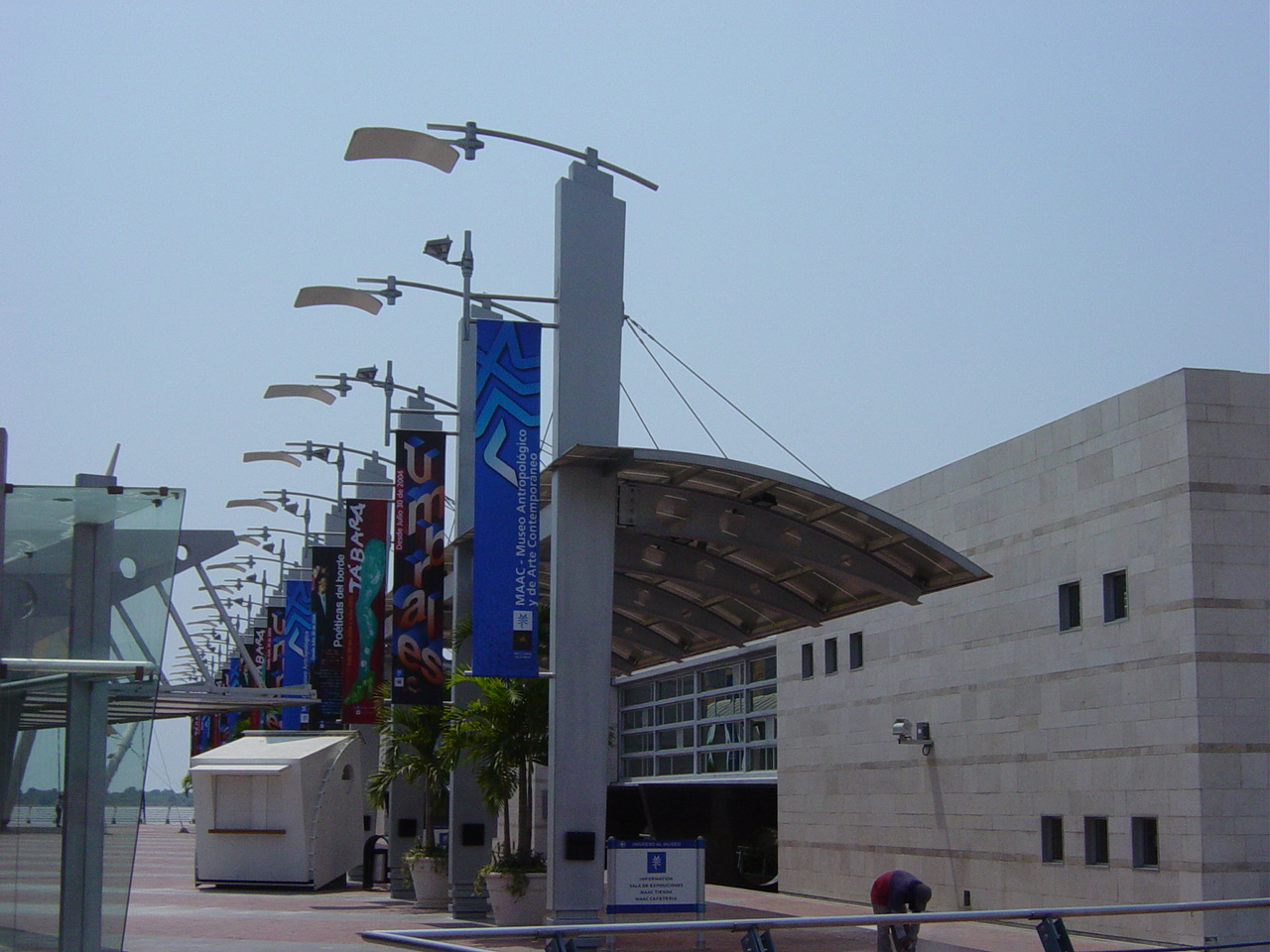
Museum of Anthropology and Contemporary Art (MAAC), near the breakwater.

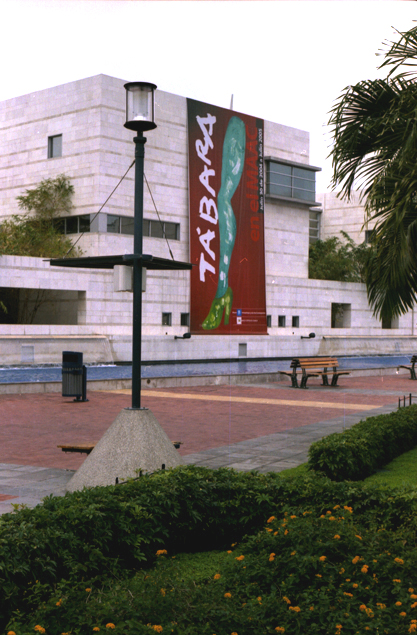
Tábara Exhibit at the MAAC in Guayaquil, 2004–2005

Museo Antropologico y de Arte Contemporaneo (English: "Anthropological and Contemporary Art Museum"), or MAAC is a state-of-the-art museum in Guayaquil, Ecuador celebrating Ecuadorian, Latin American and Pre-Columbian art and culture. MAAC is a welcome addition to Malecón 2000, the renovated riverwalk in Guayaquil. Inaugurated on 30 July 2003, MAAC aims to act as a catalyst for the development of the local, regional and national artistic culture.

MAAC's mission is to harness the institutional cultural patrimony, by showcasing a valuable collection of 50,000 native Ecuadorian archaeological pieces and over 3,000 modern works of art.

The MAAC offers many integrated programs that include exhibitions, conferences, round tables, workshops, projections of cinema, scenic arts, through which it aims to put Ecuador's cultural patrimony at the service of the development of the country and to help in cultural education of the community.

== Past exhibitions ==
- 2004–2005 — Sala Autoral, Enrique Tábara
- 2005 - Sala Autoral, Peter Mussfeldt
- 2006 — Sala Autoral, Judith Gutierrez
- 2006 — Sala Autoral, Estuardo Maldonado
- 2006 — Sala Autoral, Galo Patricio Moncayo Asan
- 2007 - Sala Autoral, Oswaldo Viteri
- 2007 - CausalityLabs, CausalityLabs
- 2008 - Sala Autoral, Juan Villafuerte

== See also ==
- Pre-Columbian Ecuador

== Sources ==
- MAAC official website (archived)
- Museum and Virtual Library (Museums of Central Bank of Ecuador) (in English)
- Museu.es: Museo Antropologico y de Arte Contemporaneo
- Whichmuseum.co.uk: Museo Antropologico y de Arte Contemporaneo
- CulturayPatrimonio.gob.ec: Museo Antropologico y de Arte Contemporaneo
- Arte-Sur.org: Museo Antropologico y de Arte Contemporaneo
- Arteinformado.com:Museo Antropologico y de Arte Contemporaneo
