= 20th-century art =

Twentieth-century art—and what it became as modern art—began with modernism in the late nineteenth century.

== Overview ==
Nineteenth-century movements of Post-Impressionism (Les Nabis), Art Nouveau and Symbolism led to the first twentieth-century art movements of Fauvism in France and Die Brücke ("The Bridge") in Germany. Fauvism in Paris introduced heightened non-representational colour into figurative painting. Die Brücke strove for emotional Expressionism. Another German group was Der Blaue Reiter ("The Blue Rider"), led by Kandinsky in Munich, who associated the blue rider image with a spiritual non-figurative mystical art of the future. Kandinsky, Kupka, R. Delaunay and Picabia were pioneers of abstract (or non-representational) art. Cubism, generated by Picasso, Braque, Metzinger, Gleizes and others rejected the plastic norms of the Renaissance by introducing multiple perspectives into a two-dimensional image. Futurism incorporated the depiction of movement and machine age imagery. Dadaism, with its most notable exponents, Marcel Duchamp, who rejected conventional art styles altogether by exhibiting found objects, notably a urinal, and too Francis Picabia, with his Portraits Mécaniques.

Parallel movements in Russia were Suprematism, where Kasimir Malevich also created non-representational work, notably a black canvas. The Jack of Diamonds group with Mikhail Larionov was expressionist in nature.

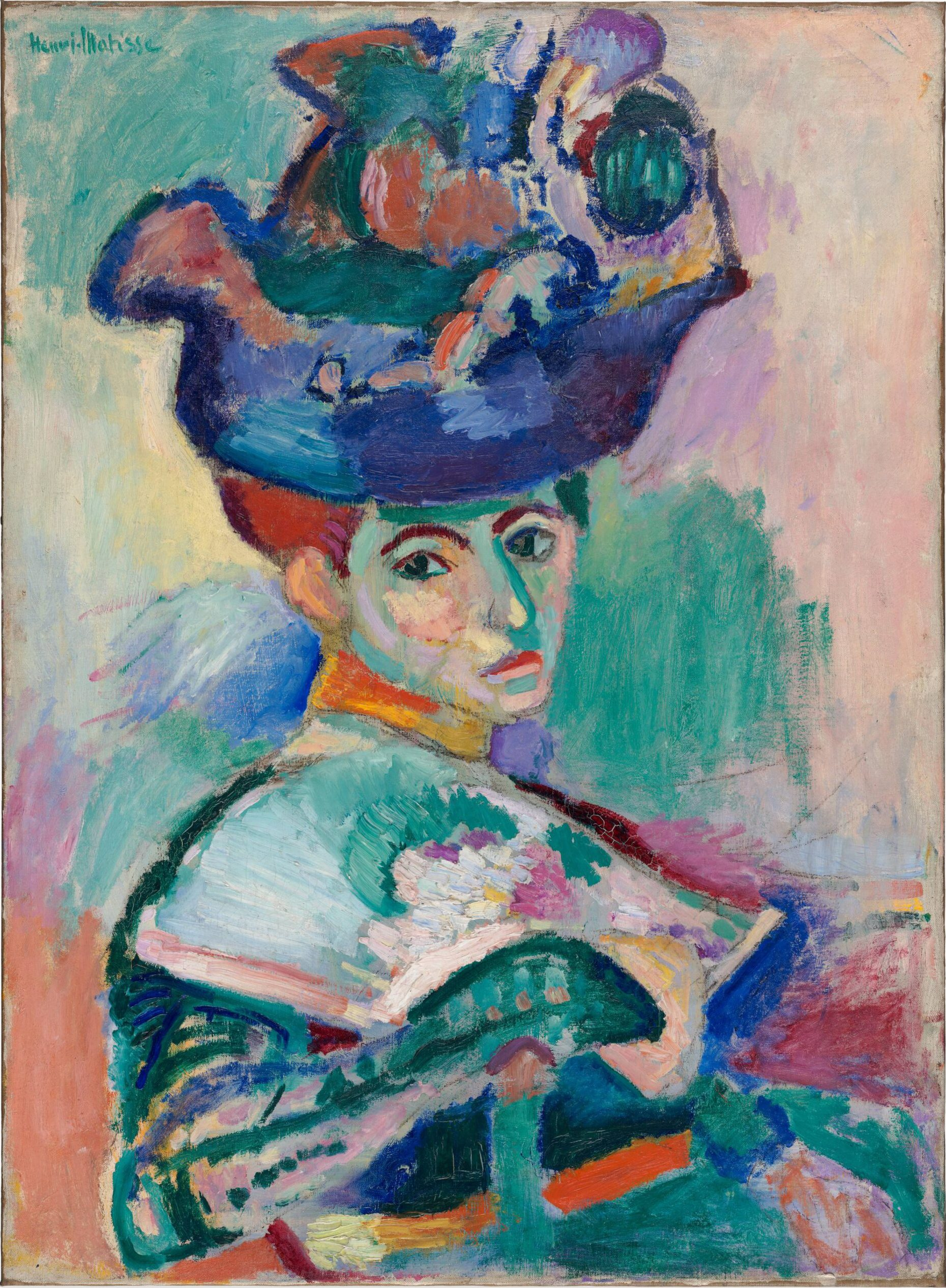
Henri Matisse, Woman with a Hat, 1905

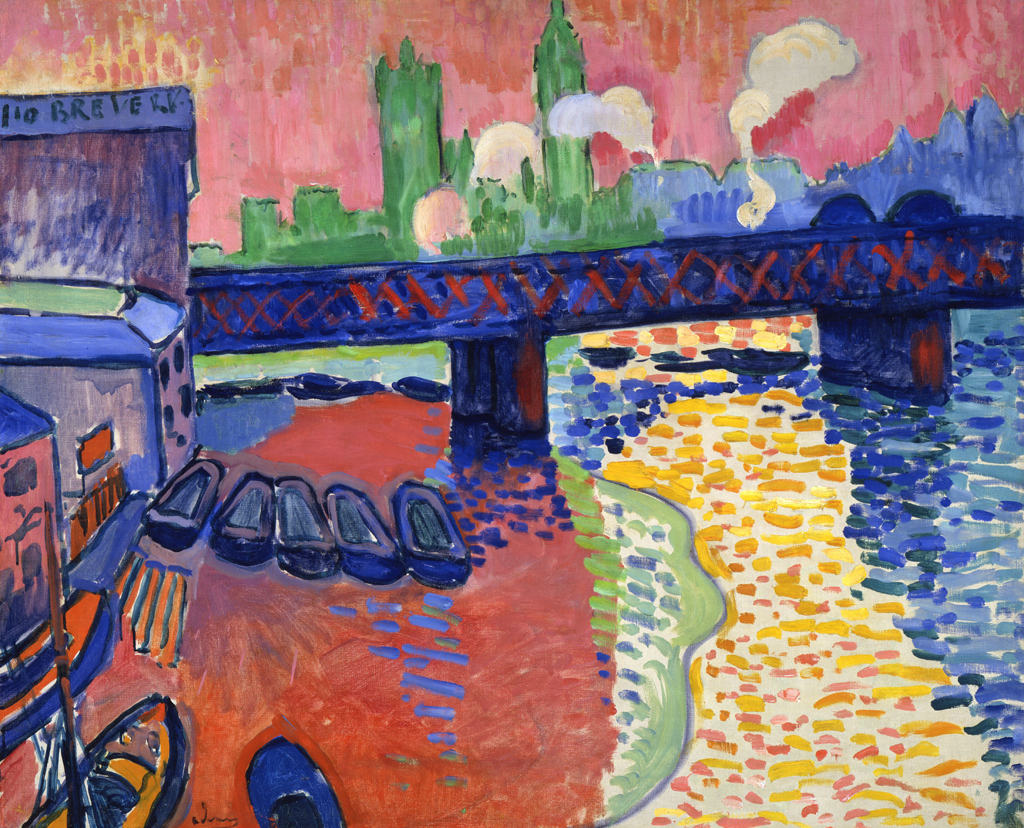
André Derain, Charing Cross Bridge, London, 1906, National Gallery of Art, Washington, DC.

Pablo Picasso, Les Demoiselles d'Avignon, 1907

Georges Braque, Le Viaduc de L'Estaque (Viaduct at L'Estaque), 1908

Jean Metzinger, Le goûter (Tea Time), 1911, Philadelphia Museum of Art. André Salmon dubbed this painting "The Mona Lisa of Cubism"

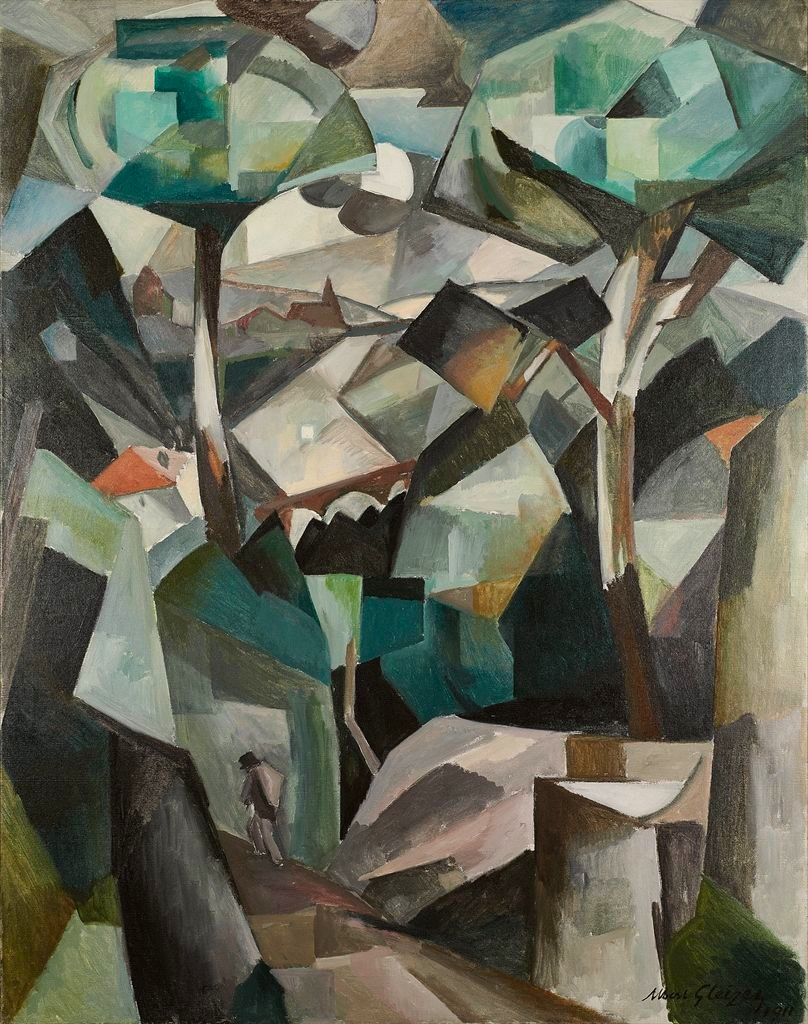
Albert Gleizes, Le Chemin, Paysage à Meudon, Paysage avec personnage, 1911

Marcel Duchamp, Nude Descending a Staircase, No. 2, 1912, Philadelphia Museum of Art

Wassily Kandinsky Composition VII, 1912

František Kupka, Amorpha, Fugue in Two Colors, 1912

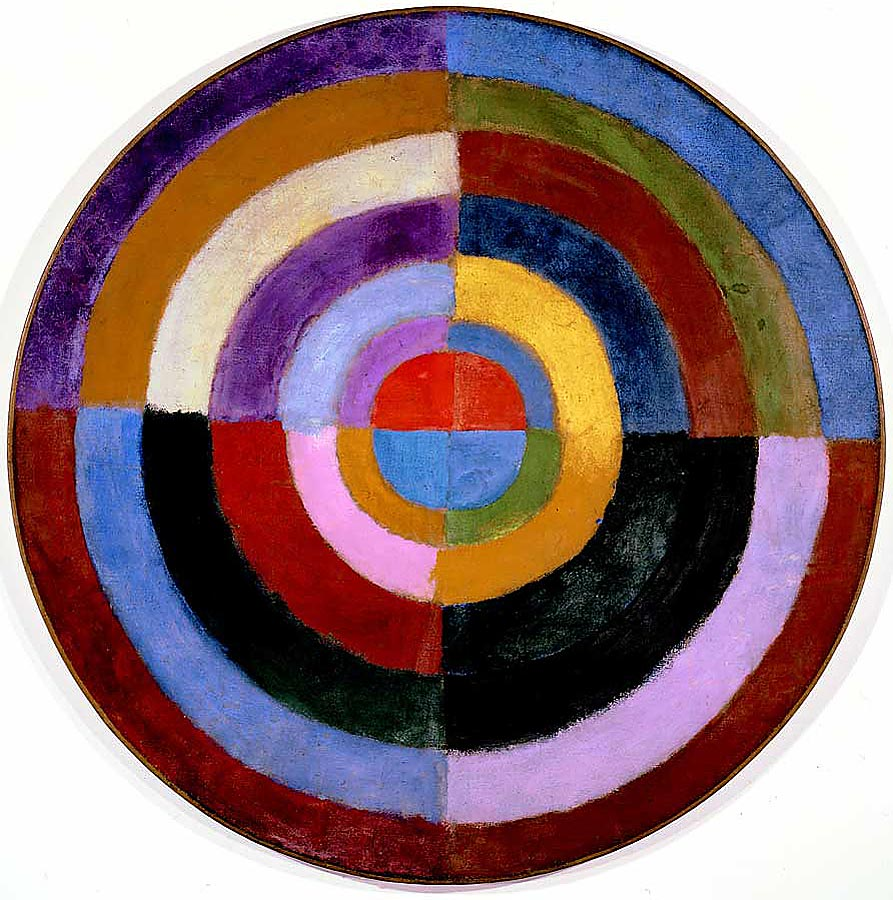
Robert Delaunay, Le Premier Disque, 1912–13

Giorgio de Chirico, Love Song 1914, Museum of Modern Art

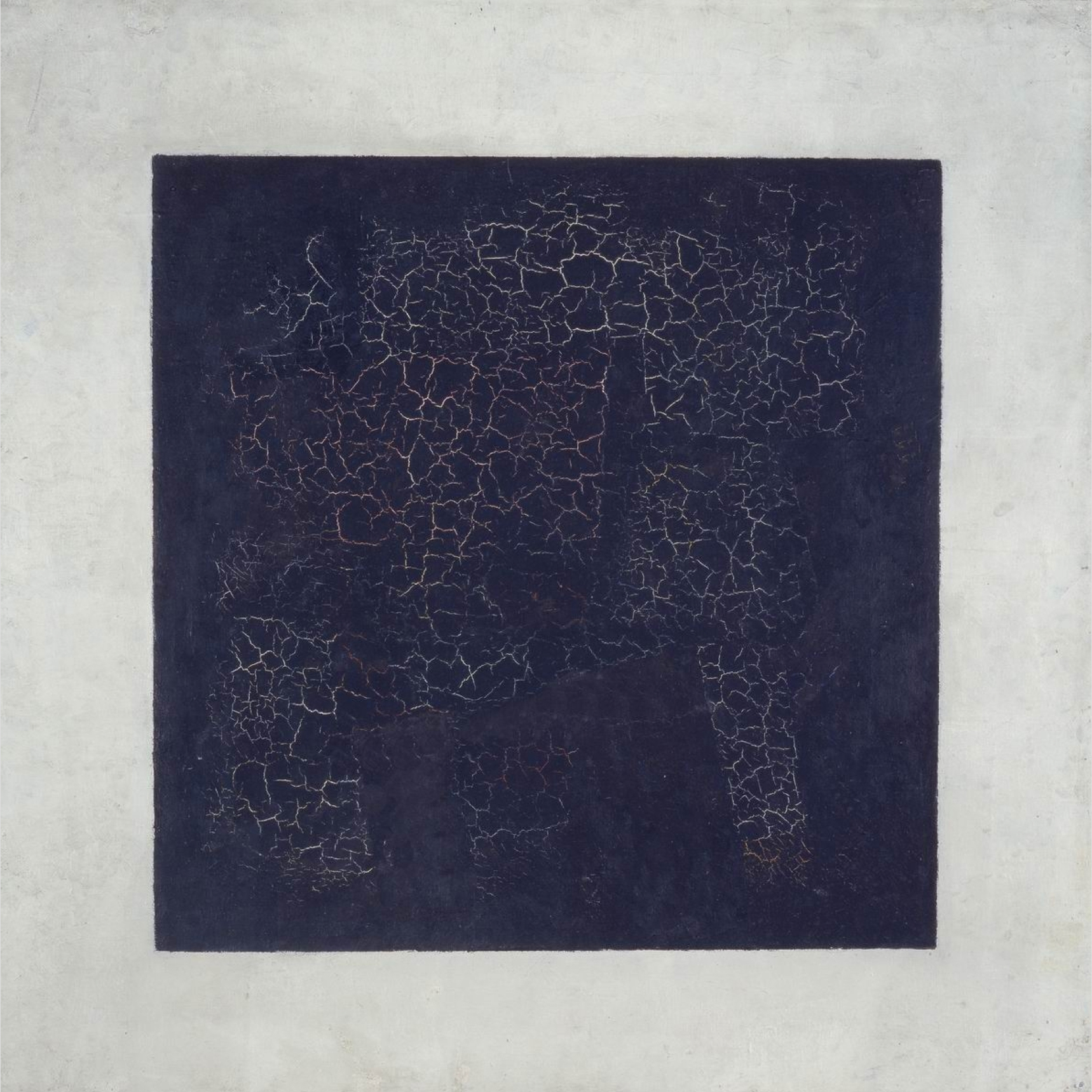
Kasimir Malevich, Black Square, 1915

Dadaism preceded Surrealism, where the theories of Freudian psychology led to the depiction of the dream and the unconscious in art in work by Salvador Dalí. Kandinsky's introduction of non-representational art preceded the 1950s American Abstract Expressionist school, including Jackson Pollock, who dripped paint onto the canvas, and Mark Rothko, who created large areas of flat colour. Detachment from the world of imagery was reversed in the 1960s by the Pop Art movement, notably Andy Warhol, where brash commercial imagery became a Fine Art staple. The majority of his art served as a critique of American consumer culture and its obsession with celebrity and wealth. Warhol also minimised the role of the artist, often employing assistants to make his work and using mechanical means of production, such as silkscreen printing. Another pop artist, Keith Haring, used cartoons and graffiti as a means of political activism, fighting against the stigma surrounding gay men and drug addicts during the 1980 AIDS epidemic. This marked a change from Modernism to Post-Modernism. Photorealism evolved from Pop Art and as a counter to Abstract Expressionists.

Subsequent initiatives towards the end of the century involved a paring down of the material of art through Minimalism, and a shift toward non-visual components with Conceptual art, where the idea, not necessarily the made object, was seen as the art. The last decade of the century saw a fusion of earlier ideas in work by Jeff Koons, who made large sculptures from kitsch subjects, and in the UK, the Young British Artists, where Conceptual Art, Dada and Pop Art ideas led to Damien Hirst's exhibition of a shark in formaldehyde in a vitrine.

== Some important movements ==
- Symbolism (arts)
- Divisionism
- Fauvism
- Cubism
- Futurism
- Cubo-Futurism
- Orphism
- Purism
- Synchromism
- Surrealism
- Suprematism
- Bauhaus
- Dadaism
- De Stijl
- Social Realism
- American Regionalism
- Butoh
- Biomorphism
- Abstract Expressionism
- Tachisme
- Lyrical Abstraction
- Informalism
- COBRA
- Outsider art (art brut)
- Fluxus
- Neo-Dada
- Rayonism
- Art Deco
- Color Field painting
- Arte Povera
- Zero Group
- Pop Art
- Photorealism
- Minimalism
- Conceptual art
- Neo-expressionism
- Appropriation art
- Installation art
- Digital art
- Op Art
- Modernism
- Late Modernism
- Remodernism
- Funk art

== See also ==
- History of painting
- Western painting
- List of modern artists
- 20th-century Western painting
- List of 20th-century women artists
- Contemporary art
- Postmodern art
- Classificatory disputes about art
- List of art movements
