= Caesar Andrade Faini =

Ecuadorian painter and teacher (1913–1995)

- Born: April 15, 1913; Quito, Ecuador
- Died: 1995 (aged 81–82)
- Education: School of Fine Arts of Quito
- Known for: Ecuadorian painter and teacher
- Style: Social Realism, later Expressionism

Caesar Andrade Faini (April 15, 1913 – 1995) was a master Ecuadorian painter and teacher who studied at the School of Fine Arts of Quito under the painter Victor Mideros.

== Early life ==
Faini was born in Quito, Ecuador. His initial work focused on Social Realism like his contemporaries Eduardo Kingman. Faini is often considered the best interpreter of Ecuador's coastal landscape.

== Painting ==
Faini's works bear the usual characteristics of the ideas of Social Realism, the prevalent theme of his generation. Other notable contemporaries included Eduardo Kingman, Bolívar Mena Franco, Oswaldo Guayasamín and Diogenes Paredes.

Faini graduated in 1937, writing a thesis entitled 'Social Misery'.

Faini moved to different places to infuse his work with new themes, gathering new influences along the way. He first went to Panama, where he mostly made murals. In 1943, he moved to Guayaquil. It was there that he began to create expressionistic works, a change brought about by the strong influence of Hans Michaelson. Faini fell in love with the city. He married while he was in Guayaquil.

== Influence ==
In 1954 Faini succeeded Michaelson as the director of Guayaquil's Municipal School of Art. During his directorship he mentored numerous students who would later go on to become famous artists. These included Theo Constanté, Luis Miranda, José Carreño and Juan Villafuerte.

The fifties also marked a shift in Faini's style. Peculiar characteristics emerged in his works during this period, but they continued to bear his unique spiritual and poetic inspiration.

== Awards and prizes ==
- 1957 - First Prize Acquisition - Mariano Aguilera
- 1959 - Third Prize - Hall October, Guayaquil, Ecuador
- 1961 - Hall October - House of Culture, Quito, Ecuador
