= Rolf Blomberg =

Swedish explorer and film maker (1912–1996)

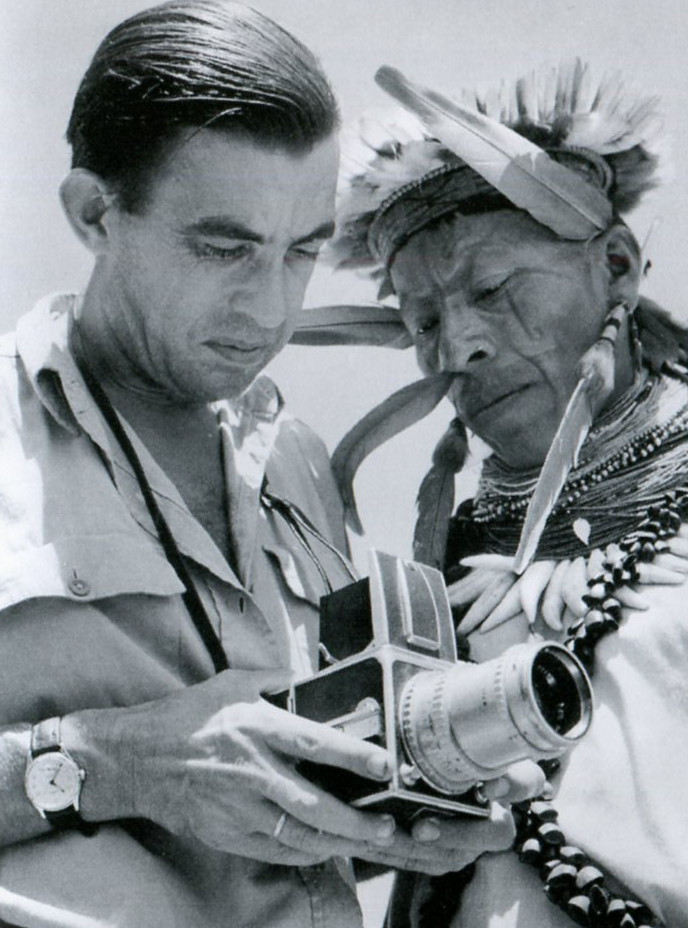
- Born: 11 November 1912
- Died: 8 December 1996 (aged 84)

Rolf Blomberg (11 November 1912 – 8 December 1996) was a Swedish explorer, non-fiction writer, photographer and producer of documentary films.

== Biography ==
Blomberg was born in Stocksund, a district of the Danderyd Municipality, in Sweden. In 1934 he made his first travel to South America, where he visited Ecuador and the Galápagos Islands. During World War II he worked as a neutral war correspondent in Indonesia. He joined the resistance movement and helped people who were trapped in Japanese Internment camps.

After the war Blomberg returned to Ecuador where he visited the tribe of the Huaorani. In six expeditions he failed in his efforts to find the lost Treasure of the Llanganatis. In 1950 he discovered Bufo blombergi which is considered as one of the largest toad in the world.

In 1955 Blomberg became a member of The Explorers Club in New York followed by memberships in the Travellers Clubs of Stockholm, Gothenburg, and Malmö in Sweden. Blomberg was married three times. The first time was in 1940 to the Swedish Karin Abdon. During the second world war, they travelled to Java, where on 19 May 1943 their son Rolf Staffan Blomberg was born. They separated after the war. Rolf Blomberg was twice married to Ecuadorian women. The first time to Emma Robinson who deceased in 1952 and the second time to artist Araceli Gilbert. In 1968 he moved to Ecuador, where he died in Quito on 8 December 1996.

Blomberg took about 35,000 photographes around the world. His Hasselblad camera was provided to him by Victor Hasselblad himself.

Blomberg produced 33 documentary features for the Swedish Television. He made films in Ecuador (including Galápagos), Indonesia, Australia, Colombia, Brazil, and Peru.

Rolf Blomberg wrote about 20 books and hundreds of articles which were published in magazines such as Life, Sea Frontiers, and the National Geographic Magazine. Many of his books were translated into several languages, including Spanish, English, Danish, Norwegian, Russian, Czech, Polish, and German. Three fourths of his publications dealt with the culture, nature and history of Ecuador.

Many social scientists around the world were influenced by Blomberg's work. His reports on human rights violations of ethnic groups served as inspiration for the establishing of organizations such as Cultural Survival in Cambridge, Massachusetts and the International Work Group for Indigenous Affairs in Oslo.

== Bibliography (selected) ==
- 1939: Underliga människor och underliga djur: strövtåg på Galapagos och i Amazonas
- 1947: Sydvart
- 1949: Vildar: en berättelse om aucaindianerna i Ecuador.
- 1951: Såna djur finns
- 1952: Ecuador: Andean Mosaic
- 1956: Guld att hämta
- 1958: Xavante: från sköna Rio till de dödas flod
- 1964: Människor i djungeln
- 1966: Rio Amazonas
- 1968: América del Sur y Central with Jean Dorst
- 2005: Blomberg Ecuador: Fotografías de Rolf Blomberg, 1934 a 1979

== Filmography (selected) ==
- 1954: Anaconda
- 1957: Jangada
