= Enrique Tábara =

Ecuadorian painter (1930–2021)

Luis Enrique Tábara
- Born: Luis Enrique Tábara; February 21, 1930; Guayaquil, Ecuador
- Died: January 25, 2021 (aged 90)
- Education: School of Fine Arts, Guayaquil; Escuela Oficial de Bellas Artes de Barcelona
- Known for: Painting
- Notable work: Patas-Patas series
- Movement: Informalism; Constructivism; Ancestralism
- Awards: Premio Eugenio Espejo (1988)

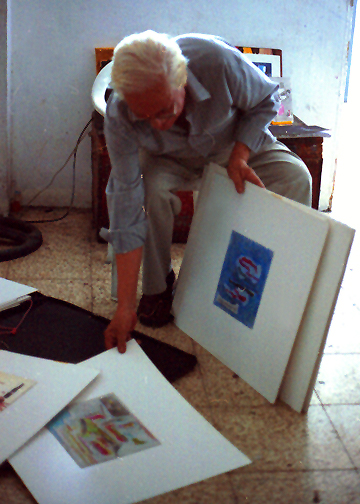
Tábara in his studio showing some of his Bocetos, 2005.

Luis Enrique Tábara (21 February 1930 – 25 January 2021) was a master Ecuadorian painter and teacher representing a whole Hispanic pictorial and artistic culture.

Tábara was born in Guayaquil. He became interested in art as a child and was drawing regularly by the age of six. In these early years, Tabara was strongly encouraged by both his sister and his mother. Enrique Tábara nevertheless was a creator who investigated and demystified the image in which he took refuge. Tábara's vitality is a constant that reveals the versatile spirit of a teacher and a master of experimentation.

Tábara was greatly influenced by the Constructivist Movement, founded around 1913 by Russian artist Vladimir Tatlin, which made its way into Europe and Latin America by way of Uruguayan painter Joaquín Torres García and Parisian/Ecuadorian painter Manuel Rendón. Torres Garcia and Rendón both made an enormous impact on Latin American artists such as Tábara, Aníbal Villacís, Theo Constanté, Oswaldo Viteri, Estuardo Maldonado, Luis Molinari, Félix Aráuz and Carlos Catasse, to name a few.

== Years in Barcelona ==
In 1946, Tábara attended the School of Fine Arts in Guayaquil and was mentored by German artist Hans Michaelson and Guayaquilean artist, Luis Martinez Serrano. In 1951, Tábara finished mastering the fundamentals and left art school. Tábara's early works typically depicted grotesque characters, marginalized peoples of Guayaquil, prostitutes, and some portraits. By 1953, Tábara began to paint more abstract images.

Tábara held his first US exhibit in 1964 at the Organization of American States (OAS) in Washington, D.C. In 1955, the Ecuadorian government offered Tábara a scholarship to study at the Escuela Official de Bellas Artes de Barcelona. Tábara's work was welcomed with great success in Spain and Tábara befriended surrealist André Breton and Joan Miró. By 1959, Tábara's work had gained a great deal of international attention. André Breton asked Tábara to represent Spain in the Homage to Surrealism Exhibition, among the works of Salvador Dalí, Joan Miró, and Eugenio Granell. Miró enthusiastically praised Tábara's work and presented Tábara with an original piece of his artwork which Tábara has long treasured.

While living in Barcelona, Tábara began working with Antoni Tàpies, Antonio Saura, Manolo Millares, Modest Cuixart and many other Spanish Informalist artists. Tàpies and Cuixart were members of the first Post-War Movement in Spain known as Dau-al-Set, founded by Catalan poet Joan Brossa. Tábara wrote several articles for their publication of the same name, Dau-al-Set. Dau-al-Set was connected with Surrealism and Dadaism and its members sought a connection to both the conscious and unconscious in their work. Dau-al-Set opposed both the Formalist Movement and the formal art centers. The group was inspired by the early works of Max Ernst, Paul Klee, and Joan Miró.

In 1963, Tábara represented Ecuador together with Humberto Moré and Theo Constanté at the Museum of Modern Art in Paris for the Third Biennial of Paris. By 1964, Tábara's work was being shown throughout Latin America, as well as Lausanne, Milan, Grenchen, Vienna, Lisbon, Munich, Barcelona, Madrid, Washington, New York and Paris.

== Return to Ecuador ==
After living and painting in Europe for over nine years Tábara felt that there was not enough being done in the name of Latin American Modern art so in 1964 he returned to Ecuador in search of a new aesthetic. Tábara reconnected to his roots through the Latin American current of "Ancestralism", which finds inspiration in pre-Hispanic cultures that inhabited the continent (third stage). Tábara is the first artist to use the Pre-Columbian motif as a search for a new aesthetic.

Shortly after returning to Ecuador, Tábara and Villacís founded the Informalist art group, VAN (Vanguardia Artística Nacional), that was in opposition to the Indigenous Art Movement. VAN had a double meaning, from the avant-garde term, Vanguard, as well as, the Spanish phrase "se van" meaning, "they are going". In other words, the artists were moving on, away from Guayasaminism and Indigenous Art Movement that had been dominating the art scene of Ecuador for decades. VAN consisted of Tábara, Villacís, Maldonado, Cifuentes, Molinari, Almeida, and Muriel. VAN strongly opposed the Communist political views of Oswaldo Guayasamín and was in a constant search for new artistic pathways while never losing a connection to their Pre-Columbian roots.

== Patas-Patas ==
Finally, Tábara started to paint simple shapes inspired in nature, and also other simple structures, such as his famed "Patas-Patas", or Feet-Feet, as well as insects and shrubs. Tábara is most known for his Patas-Patas works which contain legs with feet incorporated into the piece. When asked about this subject matter, Tábara said that one day he was drawing a figure but he didn't like it, so he ripped it up and the feet of the figure landed at his feet, thus his fate. It has been suggested by some critics that Tábara's use of feet was possibly a subtle statement in opposition to Guayasamin's use of hands. In some of Tábara's Patas-Patas works, the legs are bold focal points that stand out clearly. In other works, the legs are more obscure or seem to be hidden within shrubs, bones or abstract forms.

Tábara was an artist who was in a constant, infinite search. He liked to experiment and live "pictorical adventures". He believed that in art one has to pose difficult problems for oneself and solve them on the canvas. Today, Tábara is considered one of the most important artists of the last century and has been lauded as a national treasure in Ecuador.

In 1988, Tábara was awarded the Premio Eugenio Espejo, the country's most prestigious National Award for Art, Literature and Culture presented by the president of Ecuador. Tábara continued to paint with a vigorous spirit in his home town of Guayaquil, Ecuador. Barcelona is considered Tábara's home away from home.

== Museums and collections ==
- Museo de Arte de Lausanne, Lausanne, Switzerland.
- Museo de Arte Contemporáneo de Barcelona, Barcelona, Spain.
- Museo de Arte Moderno de São Paulo, São Paulo, Brazil.
- Museo de Arte Contemporáneo de Armada, Armanda, Portugal.
- Museo de Arte Moderno de Bogotá, Bogotá, Colombia.
- Museo de Arte de Ponce, Ponce, Puerto Rico.
- Museo de la Universidad de Rio Piedras, Rio Piedras, Puerto Rico.
- Museo de Arte Contemporáneo de Panamá, Panamá.
- Museo de Bellas Artes de Bochum, Bochum, Germany.
- Museo Juan Abello Mollet, Barcelona, Spain.
- Museo Omar Rayo, Roldanillo, Colombia.
- Museo Rufino Tamayo, Mexico City, Mexico.
- Museum of Modern Art, Paris, France.
- Museum of Latin American Art (MoLAA), Long Beach, California, U.S.
- Bronx Museum of the Arts, Bronx, New York, U.S.
- Jack S. Blanton Museum, University of Texas, Austin, Texas, U.S.
- Museo Nacional de Bellas Artes, Santiago, Chile.
- Museo de Arte Moderno de Cuenca, Cuenca, Ecuador.
- National Museum of Ecuador, Quito, Ecuador.
- The Museum of American Art of Maldonado (MAAM), Maldonado, Uruguay.
- Museo del Niño, San José, Costa Rica.
- Museo de Arte del Banco Central, Guayaquil, Ecuador.
- Museo de la Casa de la Cultura, Quito, Ecuador.
- Museo de la Casa de la Cultura, Guayaquil, Ecuador.
- Museo Antropológico de Arte Contemporaneo (MAAC), Guayaquil, Ecuador.
- El Museo del Barrio, New York, U.S
- Misrashi Gallery, Mexico City, Mexico.
- Ortiz Leiva Gallery of Art, Glendale, California, U.S.
- Galeria Elite Fine Art, Miami, Florida, U.S.
- Eugenia Cucalón Gallery, New York, U.S.
- Museo de América, Madrid, Spain.
- Collection of Carrie Adrian, New York, U.S.
- Collection John and Barbara Duncan, New York, U.S.
- Collection of Castle Cooke, San Francisco, California, U.S.
- Collection of the Pan American Union, Washington, D. C., U.S.
- Colección Galeria Goya, Mexico City, Mexico.
- Coleccion Sr. Jorge Eljuri, Guayaquil, Ecuador.
- Coleccion Sr. Georges Kasper, Lausanne, Switzerland.
- Coleccion Sr, René Metrás, Barcelona, Spain.
- Coleccion Sr. Horst Moeller, Germany.

== Individual and group exhibitions ==
- 1953 Exposición Casa de la Cultura (N. del Guayas), Guayaquil, Ecuador.
- 1954 Organization of American States (OAS), Washington, D.C., U.S.
- 1954 Segunda Exposición individual (primeras obras, no figurativas) Casa de la Cultura (N. del Guayas), Guayaquil, Ecuador.
- 1956 Museo Municipal de Mataró (first exhibition in Spain).
- 1956 Museo de Granollers (primeras pinturas de Materia) Spain.
- 1956 Ayuntamiento de Sarria, Barcelona, Spain.
- 1957 Galerias Layetanas (30 pinturas), Barcelona, Spain.
- 1958 Ateneu Barcelonès (dibujos obra en papel), Barcelona, Spain.
- 1958 Sala Gaspar (Club 49), Barcelona, Spain.
- 1959 Sala Neblí, Madrid, Spain.
- 1959 Galería Kasper, Lausanne, Switzerland.
- 1961 VI Biennial of São Paulo, São Paulo, Brazil.
- 1961 Museo de Arte Contemporáneo, Barcelona, Spain.
- 1961 Galería Hilt, Basel, Switzerland.
- 1961 Restaurant Galería "La Perette", Milan, Italy.
- 1962 Galería Falazik, Bochum, Germany.
- 1962 Nueva Galería Kunstlerhaus, Munich, Germany.
- 1962 Galería Rottoff, Karlsruhe, Germany.
- 1962 Galería Brechbuhi, Grenchen, Switzerland.
- 1963 Galería Naviglio, Milan, Italy.
- 1963 Diario de Noticias, Lisbon, Portugal.
- 1963 Galería René Metrás, Barcelona, Spain.
- 1963 Ateneo de Madrid, Madrid, Spain.
- 1963 Galería Emmy Widman, Bremen, Germany.
- 1963 Instituto de Cultura Hispánica (tintas y Aguadas), Barcelona, Spain.
- 1963 Galería Malelline, Vienna, Austria.
- 1964 Galería René Metrás ( objetos y Pinturas ), Barcelona, Spain.
- 1964 Pan American Union, Washington, D.C., U.S.
- 1965 Museo de Arte Moderno, Bogotá, Colombia
- 1965 Centro Ecuatoriano Norteamericano, Quito, Ecuador.
- 1965 Galería Siglo XX, Quito, Ecuador.
- 1966 Museo de Rio Piedras, San Juan, Puerto Rico.
- 1967 Universidad de Mayagues, Puerto Rico
- 1967 Casa de la Cultura (obras de 1960–1967), Guayaquil, Ecuador.
- 1968 Galería Contémpora, Guayaquil, Ecuador.
- 1968 Galería Marta Traba, Bogotá, Colombia.
- 1969 Galería Contempora, Guayaquil, Ecuador.
- 1969 X Biennial de São Paulo, São Paulo, Brazil.
- 1970 Galería Altamira, Quito, Ecuador.
- 1970 Latin American Paintings and Drawings from the Collection of John and Barbara Duncan, Center for Inter-American Relations, New York, New York, U.S.
- 1971 Museo Municipal, Guayaquil, Ecuador.
- 1972 Galería Altamira, Quito, Ecuador.
- 1972 Alianza Francesa, Guayaquil, Ecuador.
- 1973 Alianza Francesa, Quito, Ecuador.
- 1973 XI Biennial de São Paulo, São Paulo, Brazil.
- 1973 Casa de la Cultura Nucleo del Azuay, Cuenca, Ecuador.
- 1973 Colegio de Bellas Artes (25 años de Pintura) 1948–1973, Guayaquil, Ecuador.
- 1974 Galelía Altamira, Quito, Ecuador.
- 1975 Galería Siglo XX, Quito, Ecuador.
- 1976 Galería Buchholz, Bogotá, Colombia.
- 1976 Casa de la Cultura Nucleo del Guayas, Guayaquil, Ecuador.
- 1976 Centro Ecuatoriano Norteamericano, Guayaquil, Ecuador.
- 1977 Museo del Banco Central "Persistencia de una Imagen", Quito, Ecuador.
- 1977 Abstract Currents in Ecuadorian Art: Paintings by: Gilbert, Rendon, Tábara, Villacís, Molinari and Maldonado. Center for Inter-American Relations, New York, New York, U.S.
- 1977 The Martinez-Canas Collection of Contemporary Latin American Art, Metropolitan Museum, Miami, Florida, U.S.
- 1979 Museo Municipal, Guayaquil, Ecuador.
- 1979 Pasaje Arosemena (obra en papel), Guayaquil, Ecuador.
- 1980 Galería Madeleine Hollaender, Guayaquil, Ecuador.
- 1981 La Galería, Quito, Ecuador.
- 1982 Casa de las Américas, Havana, Cuba.
- 1984 Galería Madeleine Hollaender, Guayaquil, Ecuador.
- 1985 Galería Sosa Larrea, Quito, Ecuador.
- 1985 Museo Omar Rayo, Roldanillo, Colombia.
- 1985 Galería Perspectiv, a Guayaquil, Ecuador.
- 1986 Municipalidad de Machala, Machala, Ecuador.
- 1986 Galerias Asociadas Sosa – Nesle, Quito, Ecuador.
- 1986 Galería Madeleine Hollaender, Guayaquil, Ecuador.
- 1987 La Galería, Quito, Ecuador.
- 1987 Condominio Simón Bolivar, Quevedo, Ecuador.
- 1988 Museo Rufino Tamayo, México D.F. México.
- 1989 Homenaje al Arte Abstracto I, Jacob Karpio Galeria, San José, Costa Rica
- 1989 Centro de Arte de la Sociedad Femenina de Cultura, Guayaquil, Ecuador.
- 1989 Galería Manzana Verde, Guayaquil, Ecuador.
- 1990 Galería Expresiones, Guayaquil, Ecuador.
- 1990 Fundación Hallo "Homenaje a Tábara".
- 1991 Municipalidad de Miraflores, Lima, Perú.
- 1991 Seguros La Unión, Guayaquil, Ecuador.
- 1992 Galeria Cucalón Feria Iberoamenricana, Caracas, Venezuela.
- 1994 Elite Fine Arts Gallery, Miami, Florida, U.S.
- 1994 Galería Todo Arte, Guayaquil, Ecuador.
- 1997 Museo de Arte Contemporáneo de Panamá, Panamá.
- 1997 Museo Municipal de Arte Moderno, Cuenca, Ecuador.
- 1997 Museo Nacional de Bellas Artes, Santiago, Chile.
- 1998 Centro Cultural Jorge Fernandez, Quito, Ecuador.
- 1998 La Galería, Quito, Ecuador.
- 1998 Museo del Banco Central, Guayaquil, Ecuador.
- 1999 Museo del Niño, San José, Costa Rica.
- 1999 Casona Universitaria (Retrospectiva), Guayaquil, Ecuador.
- 1999 Museo de Arte Moderno, Cuenca, Ecuador.
- 1999 Galería Homonimus, Panama City, Panamá.
- 1999 Sala Miguel de Santiago, Casa de la Cultura B.C., Quito, Ecuador.
- 2000 Sala Marta Traba, São Paulo, Brazil.
- 2003 Bocetos de Tábara 1998–2003, La Galeria Mirador, Universidad Católica de Guayaquil, Guayaquil, Ecuador.
- 2003 Museo Pedro de Osma Embajada del Ecuador en Lima, Lima, Peru.
- 2003 Embajada del Ecuador en Bolivia.
- 2004–2005 Sala Autoral-Enrique Tábara, Museo Antropologico y de Arte Contemporaneo (MAAC), Guayaquil, Ecuador.
- 2005 Ceremony for the Museum of Art and Academic Senate (MuSA) at The University of Puerto Rico, Mayagüez, Puerto Rico.
- 2005 The Ancestralismo, Tábara, Villacís, Viteri and Maldonado, Museum of the Central Bank, Cuenca, Ecuador.
- 2005 Teatro Centro de Arte, Guayaquil, Ecuador.
- 2006 Monograph: The Work of Enrique Tábara, National Museum of the Central Bank of Ecuador, Quito, Ecuador.
- 2006 From Port to Port: Rendón, Tábara, & Gilbert, In Celebration of Ecuadorian Culture at The World Cup (Futbol), Hamburg, Germany.
- 2006 Guía de El Grabado Latinoamericano: La Evolución de la Identidad desde lo Mítico hasta lo Personal, Museum of Latin American Art (MoLAA), Long Beach, California, U.S.
- 2006 XII Fair de Libro Pacific, works by Tábara, Guayasamin, Kingman, Aráuz & Villafuerte, University of the Valley, Cali, Colombia.
- 2007–2008 Tábara: La Mirada Atenta. Museo de América, Madrid, Spain.
- 2008 Ministry of Foreign Trade and Integration – Ecuadorian Embassy in Germany, Berlin, Germany.
- 2010 Elogio de la Forma, Moderno del Museo Municipal de Guayaquil, Guayaquil, Ecuador.
- 2011 Tres Generaciones de Artistas Ecuatorianos: Fibra Obra Sobre Papel, Centro Cultural de la Cooperacion Floreal Gorini, Buenos Aires, Argentina.
- 2012 – Geografías Plásticas del Arte Ecuatoriano del Siglo XX: Desde la Estética del Objeto al Concepto, Museo Antropológico y de Arte Contemporáneo (MAAC), Guayaquil, Ecuador.
- 2013 – Retorno del Futuro, Casa de la Cultura, Guayaquil, Ecuador.

== Awards and medals ==
- 1960 Swiss Abstract Painting Prize, Lausanne, Switzerland.
- 1964 Second Prize Hall – October, Guayaquil, Ecuador.
- 1967 First Prize Hall – July, Guayaquil, Ecuador.
- 1967 First Prize Hall Vanguard, Guayaquil, Ecuador.
- 1968 Medal of Artistic Merit, Municipality of Guayaquil, Guayaquil, Ecuador.
- 1970 Gold Medal, First Hall Drawing, Watercolor and Tempera, House of the Culture, Quito, Ecuador.
- 1972 Second Prize of Contemporary Gallery, "Virgin Santísima M. of God".
- 1973 Gold Medal, 25 years of Painting Exhibition, School of Beautiful Arts, Guayaquil, Ecuador.
- 1989 National Prize of Culture – Premio Eugenio Espejo – presented by the President of Ecuador.
- 1989 Second Prize, Cuenca Biennial of International Painting – Cuenca, Ecuador
- 1994 Decoration to the Artistic Merit in the Degree of Commander by the Ecuadorian Government
- 1997 Gold Brush, Association of the Rocks, Guayaquil, Ecuador.
- 1998 Medal to the Cultural Merit (House of the Culture) Guayaquil, Ecuador.
- 1998 Medal of Honor of the National Congress by the 50th Anniversary of the Professional Trajectory of the Artist.
- 1998 Decoration of the Museum Central Bank of Ecuador, Guayaquil, Ecuador.
- 1998 Alfredo Palacio Prize (University of Guayaquil), Guayaquil, Ecuador.
- 1999 Gold Brush, Guayaquil, Ecuador.
- 2007 Nominee for the Velázquez Prize of Plastic Arts 2007, presented by the crowned King of Spain.

== Sources ==
- Arean, Carlos A., Tábara. Pelaez Editores, Centro de Arte Gala Banco de Guayaquil; Quito, Ecuador, 1990.
- Sullivan, Edward J., Latin American Art in the Twentieth Century. Phaidon Press Limited; London, 1996.
- Barnitz, Jacqueline, Twentieth-Century Art of Latin America. University of Texas Press; Austin, Texas, 2001.
- Salvat, Arte Contemporáneo de Ecuador. Salvat Editores Ecuatoriana, S.A., Quito, Ecuador, 1977.
- House of Ecuadorian Culture
