= Humberto Moré =

Ecuadorian artist (1929–1984)

Emilio Humberto Moré (1929–1984) was an Ecuadorian painter, sculptor and muralist, poet, writer, and art critic.

He was a contemporary of Enrique Tábara, Luis Molinari and Estuardo Maldonado, a group of young artists who began an art revival in Guayaquil in the 1950s and 60s.
