= Aníbal Villacís =

Ecuadorian painter (1927–2012)

- Born: November 11, 1927; Ambato, Ecuador
- Died: March 7, 2012 (aged 84); Ambato, Ecuador
- Known for: Filigranas series
- Movement: Informalism, Ancestralism
- Awards: Premio Eugenio Espejo (2007)

Aníbal Villacís (11 November 1927 – 7 March 2012) was an Ecuadorian painter. He used raw earthen materials such as clay and natural pigments to paint on walls and doors throughout his city when he could not afford expensive artist materials.

== Life and career ==
Aníbal Villacís was born on 11 November 1927 Ambato, Ecuador. As a teenager, Villacís taught himself drawing and composition by studying and recreating the illustrated ad posters for bullfights in Quito. In 1952, Jose Maria Velasco Ibarra, former President of Ecuador, discovered Villacís and offered him a scholarship to study in Paris.

After living in Paris for almost a year, Villacís never grew accustomed to the language, so he wrote to the Ecuadorian Minister of Education requesting to transfer his studies to Madrid. Villacís felt more comfortable in Spain and lived there for six years. While living in Madrid, Villacís was introduced to the Informalismo or Informalist Movement, specifically, Antoni Tàpies, Antonio Saura, and Modest Cuixart, who quickly began to influence his work. Villacís was a co-founder of the VAN Group (Vanguardia Artística Nacional), the Informalist artist collective that embraced Informalism while searching for new modern aesthetics inspired by Pre-Columbian art (also referred to as Ancestralism or The Ancestralists). Other members of VAN included, Enrique Tábara, Estuardo Maldonado, Luis Molinari, Hugo Cifuentes, León Ricaurte and Gilberto Almeida.

Villacís is mostly well known for his series called, Filigranas (Filigree), which he started in the late fifties. The Filigranas series were typically mixed media on masonite, wood or canvas with the addition of any combination of the following applied: marble dust, sand, metal, plaster, paint, gold and/or silver leaf or powder to create new modern aesthetics influenced by his Pre-Columbian ancestors. In Villacís' works made of wood he will laboriously carve into the wood to define Pre-Columbian inspired shapes and abstract symbols. Villacís will often layer many different colors of paint and then scrape some away to reveal the different colors of the layers below, giving the impression of an ancient sacred relic that has aged with time. The addition of silver and gold in Villacís' work is reminiscent of the art of the Baroque period, where the addition of these metals was often used to create a divine or sacred experience.

Villacís' passion for the art and culture of the Pre-Columbian period is obvious in his work. He feels it is the beginning of life in his continent. In Pre-Columbian art there is evidence, through images and forms, of a remote life; an insight into total wisdom and enchantment. A life colored with rituals, habits and incarnated customs, signs and symbols, magic and religion through the myth. The images are constituted by the emotional, sensible perception of vitality; and the forms represent an order of the imagination and thought, governed by a rigorous construction that was built by the creative men of prehistoric times.

In the seventies, Villacís began painting faces of Quito's ghetto children to highlight their "insecurities, uncertainty, and premature old age". Villacís has also been known to paint landscapes, cityscapes and bullfighting scenes. Villacís has always been intrigued by bullfighting, regularly attending bullfights in both Spain and Ecuador.

Internationally, Villacís has exhibited his work throughout the corners of Latin America: Ecuador, Venezuela, Colombia, Peru, Argentina, Dominican Republic, Brazil, El Salvador, as well as the United States and Europe.

In 2007, Villacís was awarded Ecuador's most prestigious honor in Art, Literature and Culture, Premio Eugenio Espejo, the National Award presented by the president of Ecuador.

Villacís died on March 7, 2012, at the age of 84.

== Selected exhibitions and collections ==
- 1950 – Venezuela Club
- 1951 – Caracas Athenaeum, Caracas, Venezuela
- 1952 – House of Culture, Ambato, Ecuador
- 1953 – Hispanic Culture Institute, Madrid, Spain
- 1954 – Minerva Hall, "Circulo de BB.AA.", Madrid, Spain
- 1956 – Colonial Art Museum, Quito, Ecuador
- 1956 – National Museum, Bogotá, Colombia
- 1956 – Colombian/Ecuadorian Institute, Bogotá, Colombia
- 1957 – "Salon Fiesta de la Fruta", Ambato, Ecuador
- 1957 – L' Hermitage Hall, Ambato, Ecuador
- 1957 – Colonial Art Museum, Quito, Ecuador
- 1957 – Mariano Aguilera Hall, Quito, Ecuador
- 1958 – American/Ecuadorian Center, Ambato, Ecuador
- 1958 – Colonial Art Museum, Quito, Ecuador
- 1958 – "Young Paintings from Ecuador", Rio de Janeiro, Brazil
- 1959 – "South American Art Today", Dallas Museum of Art, Dallas, Texas, U.S.
- 1960 – Mariano Aguilera Hall, Quito, Ecuador
- 1962 – "Asociación de Artistas Plásticos" Hall, Quito, Ecuador
- 1962 – Pan American Union, Washington, D.C., U.S.
- 1963 – Art from America and Spain, Madrid, Spain
- 1964 – II Biennial of Córdoba, Córdoba, Argentina
- 1965 – Mariano Aguilera Hall, Quito, Ecuador
- 1966 – Bolivarian Hall, Cali, Colombia
- 1966 – National School of Bolivar, Ambato, Ecuador
- 1966 – Biennial of Venecia, Venice, Italy
- 1968 – I Biennial Iberic-American of painting, Colterjer, Medellín, Colombia
- 1969 – X Biennial de São Paulo, São Paulo, Brazil
- 1969 – Luis A. Martinez Hall, Ambato, Ecuador
- 1970 – Contemporary Andean Area painting exhibition, Lima, Peru
- 1970 – II Biennial Iberic-American of painting, Colterjer, Medellín, Colombia
- 1970 – Plastic Actualization, CCE, Quito, Ecuador
- 1970 – XII October may, Guayaquil, Ecuador
- 1970 – Fruits and Flowers Party, Ambato, Ecuador
- 1971 – Altamira Gallery, Quito, Ecuador
- 1972 – University Art Museum, University of Texas at Austin, Austin, Texas, U.S.
- 1972 – III Biennial Ibero-American of painting, Coltejer, Medellin, Colombia
- 1972 – Latin-American Painting Hall, Quito, Ecuador
- 1973 – XII Biennial de São Paulo, São Paulo, Brazil
- 1973 – Represents Ecuador in the International Exposition "Picasso Homage", Washington, D.C., U.S.
- 1974 – "Pinacoteca" of the National Museum, Guayaquil, Ecuador
- 1975 – Goribar Gallery, Quito, Ecuador
- 1976 – National Plastic Arts Hall, Quito, Ecuador
- 1977 – Abstract Currents in Ecuadorian Art: Paintings by: Gilbert, Rendón, Tábara, Villacís, Molinari and Maldonado. Center for Inter-American Relations, New York City, U.S.
- 1977 – "Latino American Painting Homage" exhibition, San Salvador, El Salvador
- 1977 – "Latin-American Painters" exhibition, Santo Domingo, Dominican Republic
- 1977 – Exhibition on Gallery 9, Lima, Peru
- 1978 – I Biennial Latin Americana de São Paulo, São Paulo, Brazil
- 1979 – "Forma" Gallery, Coral Gables, Florida, U.S.
- 1980 – Art Club Gallery, Quito, Ecuador
- 1980 – "Hug e Colombo", Ascona, Switzerland
- 1981 – Lincoln Auditory, Quito, Ecuador
- 1983 – De Armas Gallery, Miami, Florida, U.S.
- 1984 – Contemporary Art Hall, Quito, Ecuador
- 1986 – Participation in the Bolivarian Museum, Quinta San Pedro Alejandrino, Colombia
- 1986 – Contemporary Art Hall, Quito, Ecuador
- 1987 – Plastic Homage for Guayaquil's 450 Anniversary, Guayaquil, Ecuador
- 1988 – Ecuadorian Painting, Dallas, Texas, U.S.
- 1991 – Exposition and Presentation of Serigraph Folder "Manzana Verde", Quito, Ecuador
- 1991 – "Posada de Artes Kingman" Gallery, Quito, Ecuador
- 1992 – Jorge Sosa Art Gallery, Quito, Ecuador
- 1994 – "Todo Arte" Gallery, Guayaquil, Ecuador
- 1994 – "Larrazabal" Gallery, Cuenca, Ecuador
- 1994 – "Filanbanco" Museum, Quito, Ecuador
- 1996 – Great Painters of the Ecuadorian Plastic, Ambato, Ecuador
- 1996 – Exhibition Fair, Buenos Aires, Argentina
- 2004 – I National Fair of Plastic Arts, Cuenca, Ecuador
- 2004 – Encuentro Tres Generaciones, Paintings by Villacís, his son and his granddaughter, Casa de la Cultura Ecuatoriana, Guayaquil, Ecuador
- 2004 – III Biennial of Inter-American Painting, Colombia
- 2004 – Retrospectiva Mes de las Arte, Buenos Aires, Argentina
- 2005 – The Ancestralismo, Villacís, Tábara, Viteri and Maldonado, Museum of the Central Bank, Cuenca, Ecuador
- 2005 – Pinturas de Villacís, Galeria Todo Arte, Guayaquil, Ecuador
- 2006 – Centro Cultural Metropolitano de Quito, Quito, Ecuador
- 2006 – Quito: The City, The Paintings, Itchimbía Cultural Center, Quito, Ecuador
- 2008 – Ministry of Foreign Trade and Integration – Ecuadorian Embassy in Germany, Berlin, Germany
- 2009 – Latin American Art: Glimpses from the 1960s and 1970s, Museum of Fine Arts, St. Petersburg, Florida, U.S.
- 2010 – Elogio de la Forma, Moderno del Museo Municipal de Guayaquil, Guayaquil, Ecuador
- 2011 – Símbolos y Signos de Nuestra Sangre, Museo de Arte Colonial, Quito, Ecuador
- 2012 – Símbolos y Signos, Las Huellas Recogidas, Casa de la Cultura Ecuatoriana – Núcleo del Guayas, Guayaquil, Ecuador
- 2012 – Geografías Plásticas del arte Ecuatoriano del Siglo XX: Desde la Estética del Objeto al Concepto, Museo Antropológico y de Arte Contemporáneo (MAAC), Guayaquil, Ecuador
- Permanent Collection – Casa de la Cultura, Guayaquil, Ecuador
- Permanent Collection – Museo de Arte Colonial, Quito, Ecuador
- Permanent Collection – San Diego Museum of Art, San Diego, California, U.S.
- Permanent Collection – Blanton Museum of Art, The University of Texas at Austin, Austin, Texas, U.S.
- Permanent Collection – Museo Antropologico y de Arte Contemporaneo (MAAC), Guayaquil, Ecuador
- Permanent Collection – National Museum of the Central Bank of Ecuador, Quito, Ecuador
- Permanent Collection – Art Museum of the Americas, Organization of American States (OAS), Washington, D.C., U.S.
- Permanent Collection – Pat Clark Gallery, Ellsworth College, Iowa Falls, Iowa, U.S.
- Permanent Collection – Embassy of Panama, Washington, D. C., U.S.

== Awards and distinctions ==
- 1952 – Velasco Ibarra's Government Scholarship to study in Europe
- 1953 – Scholarship from Hispanic Cultural Institute of Madrid, Madrid, Spain
- 1956 – Prize Acquisition Museum of Colonial Art, Quito, Ecuador
- 1957 – Second "Acquisition Award", Mariano Aguilera Hall, Quito, Ecuador
- 1959 – Acquisition Award, South America Art of Today, Dallas Museum of Art, Dallas, Texas, U.S.
- 1959 – Third Prize "Guayaquil Foundation Hall", Guayaquil, Ecuador
- 1960 – First Prize Mariano Aguilera in Quito, Ecuador
- 1960 – Second Prize Acquisition of the XI Hall, Guayaquil, Ecuador
- 1963 – Special Recognition, Mariano Aguilera Hall, Quito, Ecuador
- 1964 – Second Prize II Biennial of Córdoba, Córdoba, Argentina
- 1965 – First Prize Mariano Aguilera for the work, Incaico, Quito, Ecuador
- 1966 – Second Prize, Salón Bolivariano de Cali, Cali, Colombia
- 1969 – First Prize, Salón de la Casa de la Cultura de Guayaquil, for the work, Calendario Precolombino, Guayaquil, Ecuador
- 1970 – First Prize in XIII Salón de Octubre de Guayaquil, Guayaquil, Ecuador
- 1972 – First Prize, Latin-American Painting Hall, Quito, Ecuador
- 1972 – Second Prize, National Plastic Arts Hall, Quito, Ecuador
- 1978 – Decoration of Artistic Merit in the Order of Commander, Ecuador
- 1980 – Artistic Merit Honor, Jaime Roldos Presidency
- 2005 – First National Prize, Eugenio Espejo
- 2005 – Recognition Tribute, Regional Direction of Culture Central Bank Guayaquil-Ecuador
- 2007 – National Prize of Culture, Premio Eugenio Espejo, presented by the president of Ecuador, Rafael Correa
- 2011 – Exhibit Hall named in honor of the artist in the Museo de Arte Colonial, Quito, Ecuador
