= Víctor Manuel Rendón =

Ecuadorian writer, biographer, translator, doctor, diplomat, pianist and composer

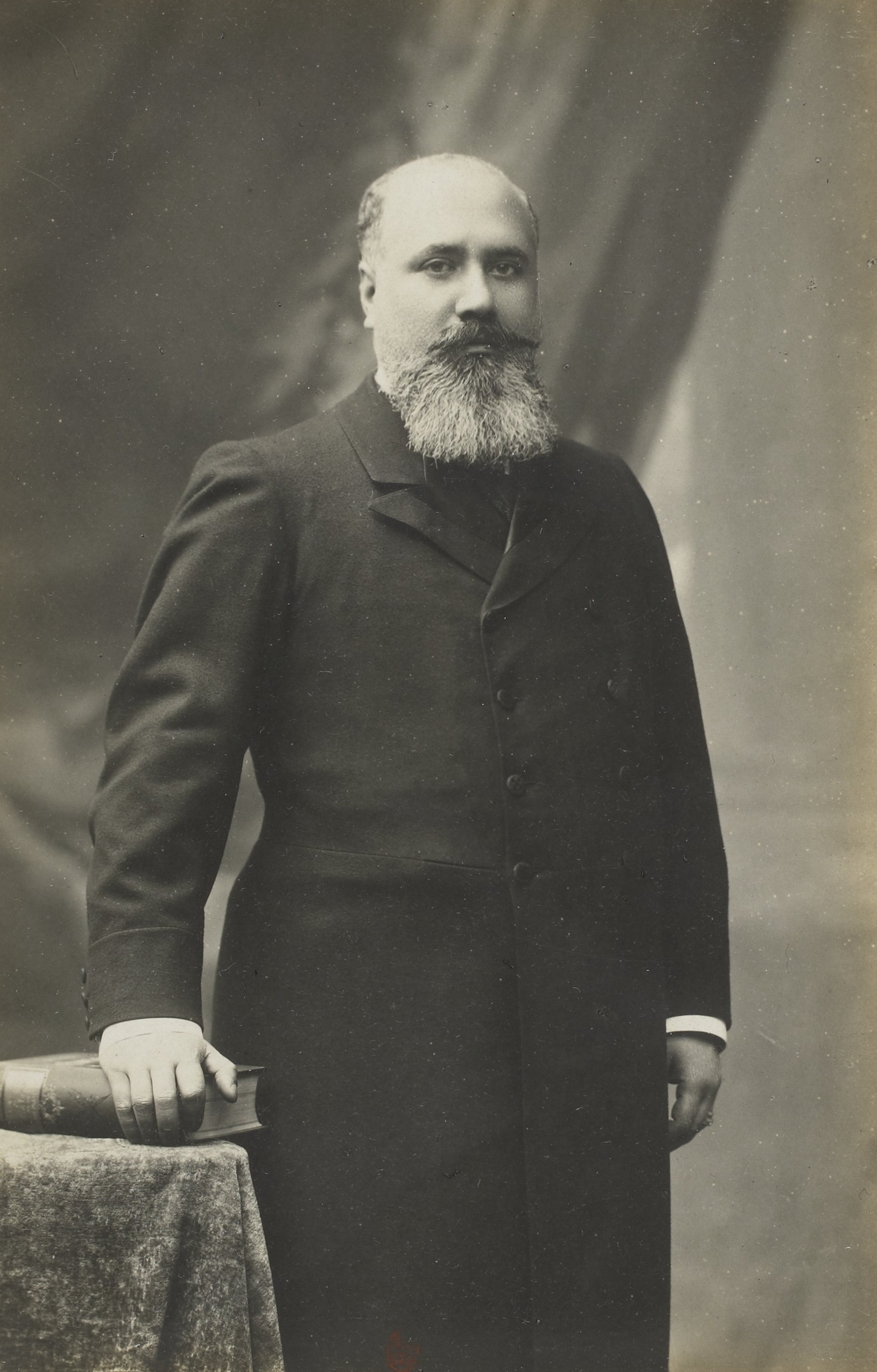
- Víctor Manuel Rendón at the 1900 world's fair held in Paris, France.
- Born: Víctor Manuel Rendón Pérez; December 5, 1859; Guayaquil, Ecuador
- Died: October 9, 1940 (aged 80); Guayaquil, Ecuador
- Occupation: Writer
- Spouse: María Seminario Marticorena
- Writing career
- Language: Spanish, French
- Notable works: Lorenzo Cilda (1906), a novel. Salus populi (1928), a play.

Víctor Manuel Rendón Pérez (Guayaquil, December 5, 1859 – Guayaquil, October 9, 1940) was an Ecuadorian writer, poet, novelist, playwright, biographer, translator, doctor, diplomat, pianist and composer.

== Biography ==
Rendón's father Manuel Eusebio Rendón Treviño was a writer and his mother Delfina Pérez Antepara was an artist. They moved to France while he was still very young and completed all of his studies there. He graduated from the University of Paris with a medical degree, with a thesis titled "Fièvres de surmenage" (Fevers of Overwork) which was published in 1888. In 1889 he returned to Guayaquil to practice medicine.

He got his first books to read from his mother and his maternal aunt Carmen Pérez de Rodríguez Coello who was a poet and playwright.

He was appointed the Consul General in Paris by the President of Ecuador Eloy Alfaro in 1895. Between 1903 and 1914 he served as Minister Plenipotentiary of Ecuador to the governments of France and Spain, and in 1907 he was a delegate to the Second International Conference of The Hague. He was a member of the International Permanent Court of Arbitration and the International Red Cross. In 1914 he was sent to Barcelona to direct the building of the monument to commemorate the heroes of the "October 9 Battle", for which his name is engraved in the pedestal of its column.

He wrote the novel "Lorenzo Cilda" in 1906 in French. His own Spanish translation of the book got him accepted to the Ecuadorian Academy of Language in 1921. The book also earned him a Gold Medal from the Académie Française on April 3, 1925.

He translated many works from Spanish to French, including a 1904 translation of the poetry of José Joaquín de Olmedo. He also wrote a biography about Olmedo in French titled: Olmedo homme d' etat et poete americain, chantre de Bolívar.

He spoke 4 languages, and wrote over 40 books in Spanish and French, which were published in France, Spain, Belgium, Italy, Portugal and Ecuador.

He was nominated for the Nobel Prize in Literature in 1935 by Celiano Monge, the secretary of the Ecuadorian Academy of Language, but did not win.

On two separate occasions he rejected the Presidential nomination of Ecuador.

== Family ==
He was married to María Seminario Marticorena with whom he had five children:

- Miguel, a French writer
- Manuel Rendón, a celebrated painter, member of the École du Paris in the 20s, who was married to Paulette Everard Kiefer, author of the book "Galapagos: The Last Enchanted Islands" (published in 1947 under the name Paulette E. de Rendón as Galápagos: las últimas islas encantadas)
- Teresa
- Margarita
- Isabel, a charity nun.

== Works ==
- Héros des Andes (1904)
- Flammes et Cendres (1905)
- Cuadro heroico (1937)
- Madrinas de guerra (1937)
- Hoy, ayer y manana (1928)
- El Ausentismo (1937)
- Con Victoria y Gloria Paz (1937)
- Periquin o la noche sabrosa (1937)
- En fuente Florida (1937)
- Salus populi (1928) – a drama about the execution of Dr. Santiago Viola in Guayaquil – considered one of his best works.
- Charito (1937)
- Almas hermosas (1937)
- El billete de loteria (1937)
- Las tres Victorias (1930)
- La caretilla (1937)
- Telefonemas (1908)
- Telepatías (1908)
- La Columna de los Próceres del 9 de Octubre (1916)
- Clemente Ballén (1916)
- Ecos de Amor y Guerra» (1929)
- Lorenzo Cilda (1906)
- Obras Dramáticas» (five volumes, 1927–1931)
- Cuentos del Delfín de las Peñas» (1934)
- Notes de mon carnet (1882)
- Documentos para la historia del Ecuador (1896)
- Héroes des Andes, poemas en francés (1904)
- Olmedo, homme d'etat et poete americain, chantre de Bolívar (1905)
- Las frontière de la Republique de l'Equateur (1914)
- Biografía de Clemente Ballén (1916)
- Le Revenant (1917)
- La columna a los próceres del 9 de octubre (1917)
- Ecos de amor y guerra (1927).
- Encantos patrios (1929)

When he died in 1940 he left behind unfinished books such as Juan Montalvo, El doctor José Recamier and Escritores ecuatorianos.
