= Marcelo Tejada =

Ecuadorian painter

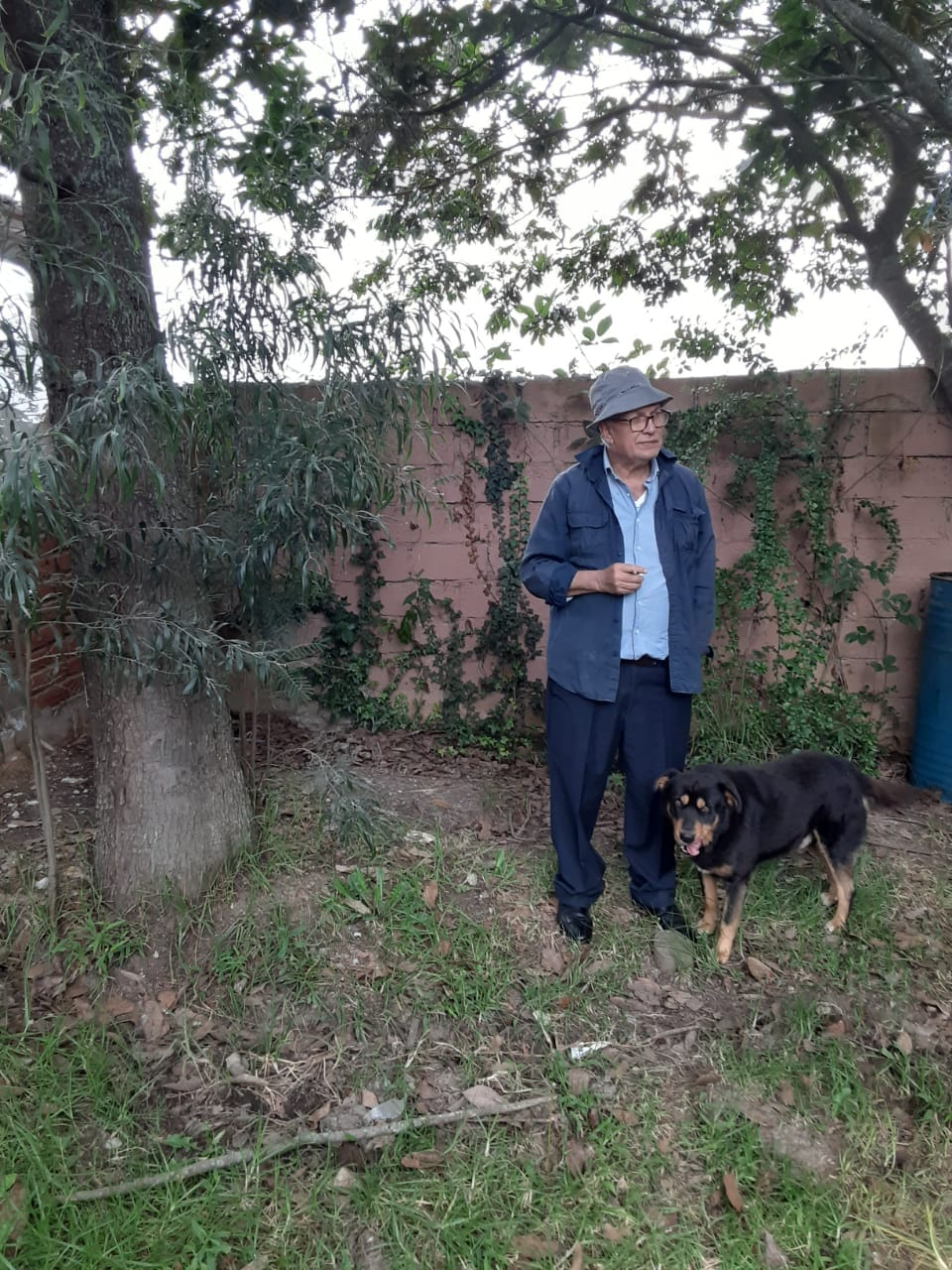
- 2022
- Born: Marcelo Tejada; Quito, Ecuador
- Awards: Salon (Paris) (1988)

Marcelo Tejada (1952) is an Ecuadorian master painter of landscapes, human figures, marines, flowers, faces, collages and abstract objects.

== Biography ==
=== The Artist ===
Since 1969, Marcelo Tejada has participated in many individual and collective expositions in Ecuador, Miami, Kentucky, Paris and Madrid. Marcelo Tejada organizes the experiences of geometric and cubist periods, and study early Bauhaus static group to feed their work.

Tejada began drawing and painting in 1966. During the 1970s, he participated in numerous national exhibitions in Ecuador, including the ''Salón Nacional de Artes Plásticas'', the ''Salón Nacional Mariano Aguilera'', and the ''Salón Nacional de Acuarela, Témpera, Dibujo y Grabado''. He received honorable mentions at the Salon (Paris) in 1974, the II ''Salón de Dibujo, Témpera, Acuarela y Grabado'' in 1977, and the ''Salón Luis A. Martínez'' in Ambato in 1978. In 1983, he received third prize at the ''Salón Nacional José Abraham Moscoso'' in Latacunga.

During the 1980s, Tejada exhibited internationally, participating in the Miami Biennial in 1986 and holding solo exhibitions sponsored by FONCULTURA and BEDE in Ecuador and Spain in 1988. That year he also received an award at the Salon (Paris). In 1989, he presented a joint exhibition with Ecuadorian painter Eduardo Kingman at the Alianza Francesa, dedicated to French President François Mitterrand and his delegation, and participated in several collective exhibitions in Paris.

Tejada continued exhibiting internationally during the 1990s and 2000s, including solo exhibitions in Paris (1990), Madrid (1990), Kentucky, United States (1997), and Quito (2002). Since 2002, his work has been permanently exhibited at Galería MarsuArte in Quito, and since 2005 he has maintained a permanent exhibition at his studio gallery, Galería Taller Marcelo Tejada, in Quito.
