= Félix Aráuz =

Ecuadorian painter (1935–2024)

- Florero, oil & sand on canvas, 2001
- Born: 2 May 1935; Guayaquil, Ecuador
- Died: 28 February 2024 (aged 88)
- Education: Studied under César Andrade Faini at the School of Fine Arts
- Known for: Ecuadorian painter
- Spouse: Nila Villafuerte Estrada
- Awards: 1965 & 1969 Second Prize, National Hall, October, Guayaquil, Ecuador; 1963 & 1972 First Prize, National Hall, October, Guayaquil, Ecuador; 1968 Great prize, Gold Medal, National Hall, Guayaquil, Ecuador; 1971 Great Prize, National Hall, Guayaquil, Ecuador; 1975 Second Prize, National Hall, Guayaquil, Ecuador; 1981 Gold Medal of Artistic Merit, granted by the illustrious Municipality of Guayaquil.; 1996 Gold Brush Cultural Association.

Félix Aráuz (2 May 1935 – 28 February 2024) was an Ecuadorian painter. Aráuz was among the art circles of Enrique Tábara, Aníbal Villacís, José Carreño, and Juan Villafuerte. In 1957, Aráuz began studying under César Andrade Faini at the School of Fine Arts. During his second year, his father died leaving Aráuz feeling nostalgic and isolated. Aráuz funneled his emotions into his work creating some of the most beautiful, heartfelt and dreamlike imagery to date. Both his use of color and his compositions are strong and designed to leave a lasting impression on the viewer. Aráuz's subjects usually include surreal flower arrangements, the innocence of children, faces, 'trees of life', landscapes and abstracts — all of which are created with a personal dreamlike aesthetic.

In 1967, Aráuz married Nila Villafuerte Estrada, older sister of Juan Villafuerte. Aráuz, Juan Villafuerte and José Carreño had a very close friendship forged at the School of Fine Arts. In the same year, Aráuz received a government scholarship to travel to the United States with the fellow master painter Gilberto Almeida a member of the VAN group, an artists' collective founded by Enrique Tábara, Aníbal Villacís, and Jaime Villa in order to study galleries and museums throughout New York, Philadelphia, Washington, Chicago, San Francisco, Los Angeles, and Miami.

In 1970, arranged through his friend, Jaime Andrade, Aráuz exhibited two paintings at the Pan American Union in Washington, D.C. and at Gallery Kromex in New York. Both exhibits were considered notable. In 1971, Aráuz obtained The Great Prize of Julio National Hall in Guayaquil.

In 1987, Aráuz traveled to Basel, Switzerland to exhibit with his friend Eloísa Melo. From there, Aráuz traveled to Brussels and exhibited with Víctor Mideros. Finally, Aráuz met up with longtime friend and colleague José Carreño in Paris.

Aráuz was a professor at the School of Fine Arts beginning in 1966 and continued to paint in his studio in Guayaquil, Ecuador.

Aráuz died on 28 February 2024, at the age of 88.

== Awards and medals ==
1965 & 1969 Second Prize, National Hall, October, Guayaquil, Ecuador

1963 & 1972 First Prize, National Hall, October, Guayaquil, Ecuador

1968 Great prize, Gold Medal, National Hall, Guayaquil, Ecuador

1971 Great Prize, National Hall, Guayaquil, Ecuador

1975 Second Prize, National Hall, Guayaquil, Ecuador

1981 Gold Medal of Artistic Merit, granted by the illustrious Municipality of Guayaquil.

1996 Gold Brush Cultural Association.

== Sources ==
- Municipalidad de Guayaquil - www.guayaquil.gov.ec/data/salondejulio/antecedentes.htm
- Salvat, Arte Contemporáneo de Ecuador. Salvat Editores Ecuatoriana, S.A., Quito, Ecuador, 1977.
- Arte Ecuatoriano, Salvat, Volume IV.
