= Pintag, Ecuador =

Coordinates: 0°24′9.15″S 78°21′55.72″W

Píntag is an agrarian village located 27.5 kilometers southeast of Quito in Pichincha Province, Ecuador.

Pintag is 9284 feet above sea level. The closest airport is the Mariscal Sucre International Airport in Quito. The town is located is near the Antisana volcano in Pichincha. Some of the residents farm and raise livestock, and horse riding is a popular local sport.

Pintag is the home to the first Jesuit house in Ecuador, a farmhouse named Hacienda Yurak. The monks quarried stone from the farm to build the church named la Compañia.

The town is known for its many public festivals. On January 1 of each year, the town celebrates the Fiesta of the Child. On the Tuesday during Carnaval the Fiesta of the Virgen de Santa Bárbara is celebrated, and on March 19, Pintag holds the Fiesta de San José. The first Sunday of October is the Fiesta of Santísima Virgen del Rosario, and the subsequent Tuesday is the Fiesta of the patron saint, San Jerónimo. On December 8, Pintag celebrates the Fiesta of the Virgen de la Inmaculada Concepción.

The artist Estuardo Maldonado was born in Pintag in 1930. Contemporary watercolorist Manuel García was born in Pintag and paints the architecture and people of the town.
