= Stanley Matthew Mitruk =

American artist

Stanley Matthew Mitruk (January 22, 1922 - December 10, 2006) was an American artist who worked in the Modernist style. He worked in the Chicago area during the 1940s, 1950s and 1960s.

== Biography ==
Stanley Matthew Mitruk was born in Chicago, Illinois, January 22, 1922 to Victoria (née Synowiec) and Joseph Mitruk. He studied at the Art Institute of Chicago, 1941 through 1942, and at Jane Addams Hull House as a private student of Julio De Diego in 1943. He worked for the Art Institute of Chicago, first in the print department, then designing installations in the Photography Gallery, and later as assistant to Kathryn Kuh in the Gallery of Art Interpretation. He taught crafts at the Arden Shore School for Boys, in Lake Bluff, Illinois, and Commercial Art at the Ray Vogue School, in Chicago, from 1949 to 1951.

Mitruk designed sets and costumes for the Chicago Ballet Repertory Company and the Chicago Opera Company in 1943 and 1944. He was a prolific artist from 1939 through 1964, and had exhibited annually since 1943 in the Art Institute's “Chicago and Vicinity Art Exhibitions,” (except in 1960). Since his first one-man showing in 1947, he has had 15 showings in the Chicago area and has participated in various group exhibitions in several museums: Brooklyn, NY; Minneapolis, MN; Grand Rapids, MI; Dallas & Houston, TX; Pasadena & Santa Barbara, CA; Springfield, MA; Springfield, IL; The Whitney Museum in New York, and the University of Illinois at Champaign-Urbana.

Mitruk stopped painting in 1964 to work for the State of Illinois in the restoration of landmarks. His major projects during this time were the restoration of the “William Henry Harrison (9th President of the United States) Mansion” in Vincennes, Indiana, and the architectural plans for the reconstruction of the original “John Deere Blacksmith Shop” in Grand Detour, Illinois, which included a huge mural exhibit.

Mitruk died in Chicago, Illinois, December 10, 2006.
