= Hugo Cifuentes =

Ecuadorian photographer (1923–2000)

- Born: Hugo Gilberto Cifuentes Navarro; 1923; Otavalo, Ecuador
- Died: 2000 (aged 76–77); Quito, Ecuador
- Known for: Painting
- Movement: VAN (Vanguardia Artística Nacional)
- Awards: Casa de las Américas Award.

Hugo Gilberto Cifuentes Navarro (Otavalo - Ecuador, 1923 - Quito - Ecuador, 2000) was a Latin American photographer. His photos show everyday Ecuadorian life.

== Career ==
Cifuentes began studying drawing and painting in the 1940s, before turning to photography. Cifuentes received his first prize for photographic composition in 1949. In the 1960s, Cifuentes joined VAN (Vanguardia Artística Nacional) — a group of progressive Informalist artists, founded by Enrique Tábara, who broke prevailing art tradition and found inspiration from the Constructivist Movement, Surrealist Movement and Pre-Columbian art. VAN strongly opposed Communist political views and searched for new artistic pathways while staying connected to their roots.

As Cifuentes developed his own visual vocabulary, humorous undertones became evident in his art. Cifuentes responded to internal conflicts and other miseries that gripped Ecuador with humor. By seeing things from a different angle, Cifuentes added new layers to the often hard realities.

In 1983, Cifuentes won the Casa de las Américas Award.

== Selected solo exhibits ==
- 1999 Ecuador from Within, Throckmorton, New York, NY
- 1994 Club Photo, Alianza Francesa, Quito, Ecuador
- 1985 Solidaridad con Nicaragua/Solidarity with Nicaragua, Museo de Arte Latinoamericano Managua, Nicaragua
- 1983 Huañurca Ensayo Fotográfico, Premio Casa de las Américas
