= Luis Molinari =

Ecuadorian artist (1929–1994)

- Born: 1929; Guayaquil, Ecuador
- Died: 1994 (aged 64–65); Quito, Ecuador
- Occupation: painter
- Notable work: 1974 painting, Temple of the nuns-Uxmal.

Luis Molinari (1929 in Guayaquil, Ecuador – 1994 in Quito, Ecuador) (Luis Molinari-Flores) was a member of the VAN Group (Vanguardia Artística Nacional), a collective of informal constructivist artists founded by Enrique Tábara and Aníbal Villacís.

Molinari began his artistic career focused on formalism, but soon discovered the works of Vasarely and was inspired by geometric forms and their rich optical effects. From 1951 to 1960, Molinari lived and painted in Buenos Aires, Argentina. In 1960, Molinari traveled to Paris, France, where he began work with the Group de Recherche d'Art Visuel. Molinari lived in Paris from 1960 to 1966. In 1963, Molinari exhibited his painting La Cuna de Mangle at the Paris Biennial at the Museum of Modern Art. In 1964, Molinari took a two-month trip to the United States to study the artworks in museums of major US cities. Intrigued by pop art in America, he saw its infinite possibilities.

In 1966, Molinari moved back to Ecuador with the sole purpose of acquiring a visa to move to the United States. During his time back in Guayaquil, Ecuador, Molinari reconnected with old colleagues: Enrique Tábara, Aníbal Villacís, León Ricaurte, Gilberto Almeida, Oswaldo Moreno and Guillermo Muñoz and began working with their Group VAN (Vanguardia Artistica Nacional). Two years later, in 1968, Molinari obtained his visa and moved to New York City where he lived for seven years. While in New York, Molinari became fascinated with the optical geometric (Op Art) works of Vasarely. He soon developed his own style, inspired by that of his compatriot, Tábara, that fused the tropical nature of his hometown into the informal constructivist geometry, toward the creation of a visual autonomy. In further development, Molinari began to focus on the geometrical optical effects and changing perspectives. He began intense studies of color theory, yet at times explored spontaneity of color and chromatic delusions. In 1977, Molinari was part of an exhibit at MoMA PS1 titled, 10 Downtown: 10 Years (September 11–October 2, 1977).

Like other VAN informalists, Luis Molinari sought to honor the history of his homeland with a tribute to Pre-Columbian architecture, as seen in his 1974 painting, Temple of the nuns-Uxmal.
