= José Carreño (painter) =

Ecuadorian painter (born 1947)

- Born: 1947 (age 78–79); Guayaquil, Ecuador
- Education: École nationale supérieure des Beaux-Arts
- Known for: Painting

José Carreño (born 1947 Guayaquil, Ecuador) is an Ecuadorian painter who studied in Paris. His first important group exhibition was held in 1965 when he attended the Latin American Painting Hall in Braniff, Texas, United States. During this time, his work revolved around the suburban based expressionism. Perhaps this exhibit paved the way for the international projection of Carreño's work. Shortly after the event his name became well known in many countries.

In 1976, Carreño traveled to Paris, France, where he settled definitively by the City of Light and joined the National School of Fine Arts, whereupon completion of courses he obtained his Higher National Diploma in Fine Arts. Then came various exhibitions and shows in the most important rooms and galleries in many European cities, especially Paris, where his work has earned applause and critical acclaim. In 1978, Carreño obtained the French Government Scholarship Award, in the exhibition gallery, South Orly Airport, in Paris. Carreño also received an Honorable Mention in 1981 at The Grand Palais, Paris. In the 90s his work was again applauded by UNESCO, Nesle Gallery and the Gallery Milletz of Paris, in Hollander and Madeleine Gallery in the Civic Center of Guayaquil and the Posada de las Artes Kingman, Quito.

== Other notable awards ==
- 1968 - 2nd Prize Foundation at the National Hall of Guayaquil
- 1969 - 2nd National Prize at the Salón Luis Martínez of Ambato
- 1971 - 1st National Award for Museum of Guayaquil
- 1971 - 1st Award "Poema Mural" at the University of Guayaquil
- 1973 - 1st National Award for Museum of Guayaquil
- 1974 - 1st National Award Hall of Paris "Young Painters"
- 1975 - 1st National Award for Museum of Guayaquil
