= Theo Constanté =

Latin American painter

Theo Constanté Parra
- Born: April 10, 1934; Guayaquil, Ecuador
- Died: April 27, 2014 (aged 80)
- Education: School of Fine Arts in Guayaquil; Academy of San Fernando, Madrid
- Known for: Painting
- Movement: Abstract Informalism
- Awards: Premio Eugenio Espejo (2005)

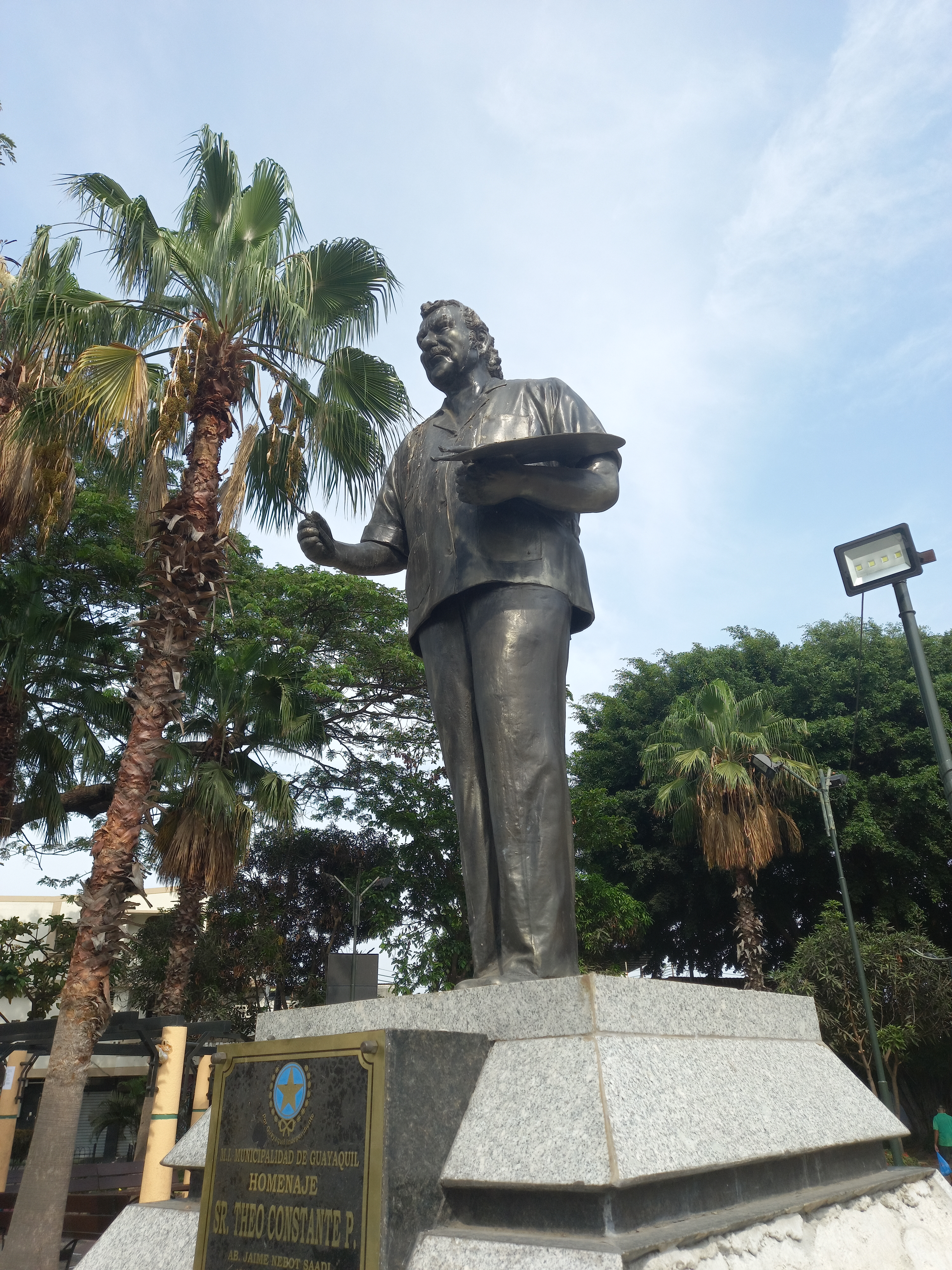
Theo Constante

Theo Constanté Parra (April 10, 1934 in Guayaquil, Ecuador – April 27, 2014) was a master Latin American painter part of the Abstract Informalist Movement in Ecuador. In 2005, Constanté won the country's most prestigious award for art, literature and culture, the Premio Eugenio Espejo National Award, presented by the President of Ecuador. Constanté's works are abstract in nature and consist of many colors which meld together amongst loosely drawn geometric lines. Constanté stated that his favorite colors were red, orange and blue and they are the colors that are typically more dominant in his work.

== Education and career ==
Constanté studied and later taught at the School of Fine Arts in Guayaquil and in the Academy of San Fernando of Madrid. In 1963, Constanté's works were represented at the Museum of Modern Art in Paris for the Third Biennial of Paris together with fellow Ecuadorian painters Enrique Tábara and Humberto Moré. The work of Constanté can be found in galleries, museums and collections throughout Guayaquil, Quito, Lima, Cali, São Paulo, Miami, New York, Paris and Madrid.

== Notable exhibits, awards and medals ==
- 1955 - Municipality of Guayaquil
- 1960 - Salon de Julio, Guayaquil, Ecuador
- 1961 - Salon de Julio, Guayaquil, Ecuador
- 1962 - Salon de Julio, Guayaquil, Ecuador
- 1962 - Salon de October, Guayaquil, Ecuador
- 1963 - Salon de Julio, Guayaquil, Ecuador
- 1963 - Third Biennial of Paris, Museum of Modern Art, Paris, France
- 1964 - Salon de Julio, Guayaquil, Ecuador
- 1967 - First Prize of the First Biennial of Quito
- 1969 - X Bienal de San Pablo, Museo de Arte Moderno, Buenos Aires, Argentina
- 1969 - X Bienal de São Paulo, São Paulo, Brazil
- 1979 - XV Bienal Internacional de São Paulo, São Paulo, Brazil
- 2005 - Premio Eugenio Espejo National Award, for artistic contributions to Ecuadorian culture, presented by the President of Ecuador.
