= Araceli Gilbert =

Ecuadorian artist

- Born: December 6, 1913; Guayaquil, Ecuador
- Died: February 17, 1993 (aged 79); Quito, Ecuador
- Spouse: Rolf Blomberg
- Awards: Premio Eugenio Espejo (1989)

Araceli Gilbert de Blomberg (1913 in Guayaquil, Ecuador – 1993 in Quito), was an Ecuadorian artist.

Gilbert enrolled in the School of Fine Arts in Santiago de Chile in 1936, studying under Jorge Caballero and Hernán Gazmurri, well-known encouragers of the Chilean plastic rebellion that later transformed into the Montparnasse group. In 1942, Gilbert returned to Guayaquil to study under Hans Michaelson. Through Michaelson Gilbert learned about European Expressionism and her work from this period was mostly figurative. At this time Gilbert was also part of an intellectual group from Guayaquil known as the Society of Independent Writers and Artists.

In 1943 Gilbert finished her dissertation in Painting, Sculpture and Art History from the School of Fine Arts in Guayaquil. Shortly thereafter, Gilbert moved to New York, where she studied at the Ozenfant Art School as a disciple of Amédée Ozenfant, one of the fathers of post-cubist purism and takes an important step towards the development of her own style.

In 1946, at the end of World War II, Araceli returned to Ecuador and moved to the capital city, Quito. In 1950 she traveled to Paris and contacted Auguste Herbin, who in 1931 had created the Abstraction-Création Group. With the guidance of Herbin, Gilbert learned to combine the geometrical and abstract concepts, subjecting them to mathematical rigor. Gilbert participated in the Spanish American Anti-biennial organized by Picasso, as well as several group shows such as the Salon des Réalités Nouvelles.

In 1953, Gilbert took a painting technology course with abstract artist Jean Dewasne. In 1954, she presented a solo show at the Arnaud Gallery in Paris with an album of lithographs, including a prologue by León Dégand.

In 1955, Gilbert returned from Paris and married the Swedish writer, photographer and explorer Rolf Blomberg. In 1960, she won the Second Prize at the IV October Salon in Guayaquil. The next year she won the First Prize for painting at the Mariano Aguilera Salon in Quito. By this point Araceli had consolidated her style, which was reaching its splendor. She mounted several solo shows and participated in the most important group shows of the country. She also represented Ecuador in the Biennial of São Paulo in Brazil, Biennial of La Havana in Cuba and Biennial of Coltéjer in Medellín, Colombia.

In 1989, the Ecuadorian Government granted her the National Prize of Culture, Premio Eugenio Espejo.

Gilbert died in Quito on February 17, 1993.

== Painting ==
  - “Mujer sentada” Santiago de Chile, Óleo sobre lienzo 41.5 x 81.5 cm. (1936–37)
  - “Cabeza de india”, Óleo sobre lienzo 50 x 37 cm. (1943)
  - “Composición con máscaras”, Óleo sobre lienzo (1946)
  - “Lomas”, Óleo sobre lienzo (1946)
  - “Cargador”, Óleo sobre lienzo 38 x 50 cm. (1947)
  - “Del mar”, Óleo sobre lienzo (1947)
  - “Composition synthese”, Óleo sobre lienzo (1950)
  - “Formas en equilibrio”, Óleo sobre lienzo (1952)
  - “Rythmes Colorés”, Óleo sobre lienzo 73 x 100 cm. (1952)
  - "Untitled", Óleo sobre lienzo 43 x 52 cm. (1953)
  - “Lironda rosa”, Óleo sobre lienzo (1953)
  - “Tout se tient”, Óleo sobre lienzo (1953)
  - “Construction dans l'espace”,Óleo sobre lienzo 100 x 73 cm. (1953)
  - “Mirage”, Óleo sobre lienzo (1955)
  - “Konkret komposition”, Óleo sobre lienzo 28 x 39 cm. (1955)
  - “Variaciones en rojo”, Óleo sobre lienzo (1955)
  - “Variaciones en rojo II”, Óleo sobre lienzo (1955)
  - “Frialdad”, Óleo sobre lienzo (1958)
  - “Tema sobre blanco”, Óleo sobre lienzo (1958)
  - “Homenaje a Anton Webern”, Óleo sobre lienzo (1961)
  - “Requiem por Sydney Bechet”, Óleo sobre lienzo (1963)
  - “Composición”, Óleo sobre lienzo 100x 82 (1971)
  - “Modular III”, Óleo sobre lienzo (1977)
  - “Elogio al círculo”, Óleo sobre lienzo (1978)
  - “Diagonal III”, Grabado 52 x 49 cm (1979)
  - “Manhattan”, Óleo sobre lienzo (1985)
