= Carlos Catasse =

Chilean painter

- Born: Carlos Tapia Sepúlveda; 1945; Santiago, Chile
- Died: January 19, 2010 (aged 64–65); Quito, Ecuador
- Known for: Painting

Carlos Catasse (1944 – January 19, 2010), born Carlos Tapia Sepúlveda in Santiago, Chile, formed his new last name by combining the first two letters of his first, middle and last names. Catasse is a Chilean painter of international recognition. Since 1969, he has lived and painted in Quito, Ecuador, the country that in 1986 granted him with Ecuador's National Prize for Painting, the Premio Eugenio Espejo. Catasse has had a great number of individual exhibitions throughout Latin America, as well as, Switzerland, Italy, Germany, Spain, and the United States. After Catasse died in Quito, Ecuador at the age of 65, his remains were cremated in a cemetery in the Ecuadorian capital, and there are plans to open a gallery exhibition of his works.

== Museums ==
- "Two suns for my earth", Latin American Museum of Art, Havana, Cuba.
- "Pre-Columbian with fish", Larrés Drawing Museum, Aragón, Spain.
- Contemporary Art Museum, Cuenca, Ecuador
- Museum of Modern Art, Quito, Ecuador
- Museum of San Diego, Bogotá, Colombia
- The Simmons Gallery, San Francisco, California, US

== Individual exhibitions ==
- 1968 Santa Maria, Bs. Ace, Argentina
- 1968 Nac. House of the Currency, Potosí, Bolivia
- 1969 Gallery Kitgua, Quito, Ecuador
- 1970 Hall Pachacama, Guayaquil, Ecuador
- 1971 Gallery Marshal, Sucre, Chile
- 1972 Bank of Chile, Santiago, Chile
- 1972 Museum of Art, Quito, Ecuador
- 1973 Gallery Pachacama, Quito, Ecuador
- 1973 Gallery Charpentier, Quito, Ecuador
- 1973 Museum of San Diego, Bogotá, Colombia
- 1973 Museum of Art, Quito, Ecuador
- 1974 Room Loving Raverón, Caracas, Venezuela
- 1974 Gallery Gaud, Maracaibo, Venezuela
- 1974 Gallery Caspicana, Quito, Ecuador
- 1975 Gallery Charpentier, Quito, Ecuador
- 1976 Gallery Caspicana, Quito, Ecuador
- 1978 Gallery Goribar, Quito, Ecuador
- 1979 Gallery Echo, Santiago, Chile
- 1980 Gallery Shaves Nui, Ecuador Salt mine
- 1980 Gallery André, Caracas Venezuela 1982 Gallery Goribart, Quito, Ecuador
- 1984 Gallery Pomaire, Quito, Ecuador
- 1986 Chistina & Artur Stutz, Swiss, Zurich
- 1986 Peltrameli Gallery, Rome, Italy
- 1989 Gallery Goya, Zaragoza, Spain
- 1990 Center of Art, León, Spain
- 1990 Gallery Marisa Almazán, Madrid, Spain
- 1991 Club of the Bank, Files, Peru
- 1991 Gallery Goya, Zaragoza, Spain
- 1992 Gallery Montmartre, Bilbao, Spain
- 1993 Bottom Art Contemp., Zaragoza, Spain
- 1993 Gallery Tocre, Madrid, Spain
- 1993 Center of Art, Leon, Spain
- 1994 Muñoz Gallery Fertile valley, Ecuador River basin
- 1995 Gallery America 2000, Files, Peru
- 1995 Gallery Coffee, Tübingen, Germany
- 1996 Center of Art, Leon, Spain
- 1996 Arquelógico Museum, The Chile Night love song
- 1996 House of the Culture, Vine of the Sea, Chile
- 1997 Praxis International Art, Santiago, Chile

== Awards & Prizes ==
- 1967 First Prize, Independent Artists Association, Santiago, Chile.
- 1977 First Prize, Guayras Province, Guayaquil, Ecuador.
- 1978 Prize "Camilo Egas", Ecuador.
- 1979 First Prize, VIII Art gallery, Guayaquil, Ecuador.
- 1985 First Honor Mention, XXIX National Hall, Guayaquil, Ecuador.
- 1986 Premio Eugenio Espejo, Quito, Ecuador.

== References and sources ==
Sources

- Salvat, Arte Contemporáneo de Ecuador. Salvat Editores Ecuatoriana, S.A., Quito, Ecuador, 1977.
