= Gilberto Almeida =

Ecuadorian painter (1928–2015)

Gilberto Almeida at Pan-American Union exhibit, 1969. From Organization of American States photo

Gilberto Almeida Egas (30 May 1928 – 20 April 2015) was an Ecuadorian painter born in San Antonio de Ibarra, in Imbabura Province. He studied at the School of Fine Arts in Quito from 1953 to 1957. His early work was in many media, especially paintings of buildings and views in old Quito; his later work concentrated on large black-and-white drawings, in a baroque, expressionistic, and dramatic style.

He has exhibited in major Ecuadoran cities including Quito, Guayaquil, and Cuenca. In 1963 he was invited to exhibit in Chile, and he subsequently exhibited in Buenos Aires, Argentina, at the Galería de la Asociación de Artistas Plásticos. In 1969 he exhibited at the museum of the Pan American Union in Washington, D.C.

Works by Almeida are included in the collections of museums and galleries in Sweden, Argentina, Chile, Mexico, Venezuela, Israel, Australia, the United States, and Canada in addition to Ecuador, and in major private collections.

He died on 20 April 2015.

== Honours and awards ==
=== Invitational exhibitions ===
- 1963 Invited exhibitor, Third São Paulo Art Biennial
- 1963 Guest of honor, spring salon, Mendosa, Argentina
- 1965 Guest of honor, spring salon, Viña del Mar, Chile
- 1967 Invited exhibitor, Cali Biennial, Colombia
- 1969 Invited exhibitor, Colteger Biennial, Medellín, Colombia
- 1970 Invited exhibitor, Inter-American Development Bank, Washington DC
- 1985 Nominated as Artist of the Year, Asociación de Periodistas (Press Association)
- 1993 Nominated for Premio Eugenio Espejo
- 1996 Invited exhibitor at the trimillennial celebration of the city of Jerusalem, Israel
- 1998 Homage to the artists of De Vanguardia, Casa de la Cultura Ecuatoriana, Quito
- 2000 Exhibition in Lima, Peru, at the invitation of the Ecuadorian Embassy
- 2001 Invitational exhibition in Australia

=== Awards ===
- First prize, V Bolivarian Games
- First prize, Casa de la Cultura Núcleo Azuay
- First prize, fiesta de las frutas y de las flores Ambato
- Third prize, Mariano Aguilera Award, Quito
- Second prize, July salon, Guayaquil
- First prize, October exhibition (Guayaquil, 1959)
- Second prize, Bolivarian salon, Guayaquil
- First prize, mural project
- First prize for culture of the Ministry of Public Works
- First prize, Mariano Aguilera Award, (Quito, 1964)
- First prize, July salon, Guayaquil
- Second prize, International independence salon, Quito
- First prize, National Salon of the Plastic Arts, Quito
- First prize of the national exhibition in the House of Culture, (Quito, 1976)
- Second prize, Banco Central del Ecuador National Arts Awards, Quito
- First prize International Biennial, Cuenca, critics' choice

=== Honours ===
- 21 February 2002: Order of Merit, Official Grade, conferred by President Gustavo Noboa Bejarano
- 4 June 2003: Doctor Vicente Rocafuerte Award of the National Congress of Ecuador, conferred by its president, Guillermo Landázuri Carrillo
- June 2003: Award of Artistic Merit, San Antonio de Ibarra
- June 2003: Award from the Council of the Province of Imbabura
- June 2003: Award of Artistic Merit, Casa de la Cultura Núcleo, Carchi.
- September 2006 Homage and recognition of lifetime artistic achievement on the occasional of the celebration of the 400th anniversary of the Spanish foundation of the city of Ibarra
- September 2006: Homage and recognition of lifetime artistic achievement, Instituto Superior Tecnológico de Artes Plásticas "Daniel Reyes"

== Bibliography ==
- Palabra e Imagen año 1999 – Marco Antonio Rodríguez.
- Artistas Plásticos del Ecuador año 2002 – Ministerio de Relaciones Exteriores.
- Grandes del Siglo Veinte año 2002 - Marco Antonio Rodríguez.
