= Oswaldo Viteri =

Ecuadorian artist (1931–2023)

- Born: October 8, 1931
- Died: July 24, 2023 (aged 91)
- Education: Central University of Equador
- Known for: Assemblage, painting, drawing, printmaking, mosaics
- Movement: Neo-figuration

Oswaldo Viteri (8 October 1931 – 24 July 2023) was an Ecuadorian neo-figurative artist. Viteri gained recognition for his assemblage work, but has worked in a wide variety of media, including painting, drawing, printmaking, and mosaics.

== Biography ==
Viteri was born on 8 October 1931. He began his education as a student of architecture at the Central University of Quito in 1951. Viteri worked in the workshop of Oswaldo Guayasamín and in 1959 assisted him on a mural commission for the Ministry of Public Works. During the 1960s he focused on painting and studying anthropology and folklore. In 1966, Viteri finished his degree in architecture and was appointed director of the Ecuadorian Institute of Folklore. He began to explore more experimental techniques of making art by incorporating collage and objects into his canvases. He made his first assemblage works in 1968 and appeared in his first "happening" that same year in Quito. He began to exhibit his work internationally in the 1960s, including in the 1964 Biennale of Córdoba, Argentina, and in the 1969 São Paulo Biennial for which he received honorable mention. His work became more sculptural in the 1970s as he began his Multiples series of assemblage works that use rag dolls and found objects. He has been twice candidate to the Prince of Asturias Awards.

Oswaldo Viteri died on 24 July 2023, at the age of 91. His house, in northern Quito, is now a museum, welcoming visitors by appointment.

== Notable exhibitions ==
- Museo Nacional - Buenos Aires, Argentina (1986)
- Museo Rufino Tamayo - Mexico, D.F. (1988)
- National Museum - Moderna Museet - Stockholm, Sweden (1989)
- Museo Marco - Monterrey, Mexico (1995)
- Museo Nacional de Bellas Artes - Buenos Aires, Argentina (2002)
- Museum of Latin America Art (2003)
