= List of museums in Ecuador =

As of the last comprehensive survey published in 2018, there were 175 museums in Ecuador.

== National museum network ==
As of 2020, Ecuador's Ministry of Culture and Heritage administers a national network of seventeen museums through four institutions designated as core museums. The core museums are listed below in bold, before their respective subordinate museums:

- **National Museum of Ecuador**, Quito
  - Imbabura Factory Cultural Complex, Atuntaqui
  - Esmeraldas Museum and Cultural Centre, Esmeraldas
  - Ibarra Museum and Cultural Centre, Ibarra
  - Camilo Egas Museum, Quito
  - Mariscal Sucre Cultural Civic Centre, Museum and Library, Chillogallo, Quito
- **Museum of Anthropology and Contemporary Art**, Guayaquil
  - Lovers of Sumpa Museum, Santa Elena
  - Nahim Isaías Museum, Guayaquil
  - Presley Norton Museum, Guayaquil
- **Pumapungo Museum**, Cuenca
  - Loja Museum and Cultural Centre, Loja
  - Riobamba Museum and Cultural Centre, Riobamba
- **Alfaro City Civic Centre**, Montecristi
  - Manta Museum and Cultural Centre, Manta
  - Portoviejo Museum and Archives, Portoviejo
  - Bahía de Caráquez Museum and Cultural Centre, Bahía de Caráquez

The Ministry also administers the archaeological sites of Ingapirca and Hojas–Jaboncillo, both of which have site museums, through the National Institute of Cultural Heritage.

== Other museums in Ecuador by location ==
The Ministry of Culture and Heritage published a directory of 175 Ecuadorian museums in 2018. Besides those administered by the Ministry of Culture and Heritage, other museums in Ecuador include those in the following list, sorted by location:

=== Ambato ===
- Martínez-Holguín House Museum

=== Cuenca ===
- Museum of Aboriginal Cultures
- Museum of Las Conceptas Monastery
- Museum of the Old Cathedral of Cuenca

=== Guayaquil ===
- Guayaquil Municipal Museum
- Luis Adolfo Noboa Naranjo Museum
- Museum of the Ecuadorian Firefighter

=== Quito and Pichincha Province ===
- Abya Yala Museum
- Alberto Mena Caamaño Museum
- Benjamín Carrión Palace
- Carondelet Palace
- La Capilla del Hombre
- Casa de la Cultura Ecuatoriana
- Casa del Alabado Museum of Pre-Columbian Art
- City Museum (Quito)
- Ciudad Mitad del Mundo
- Cochasquí
- Ecuador National Museum of Medicine
- Friar Pedro Gocial Museum in the Convent of San Francisco
- Gustavo Orcés V. Natural History Museum
- Inti Ñan Museum
- Metropolitan Cultural Center
- Museum House of Sucre
- Numismatic Museum of Ecuador
- Quito Astronomical Observatory

== See also ==
- List of museums by country
