= National Museum of Ecuador =

- Museo nacional del Ecuador
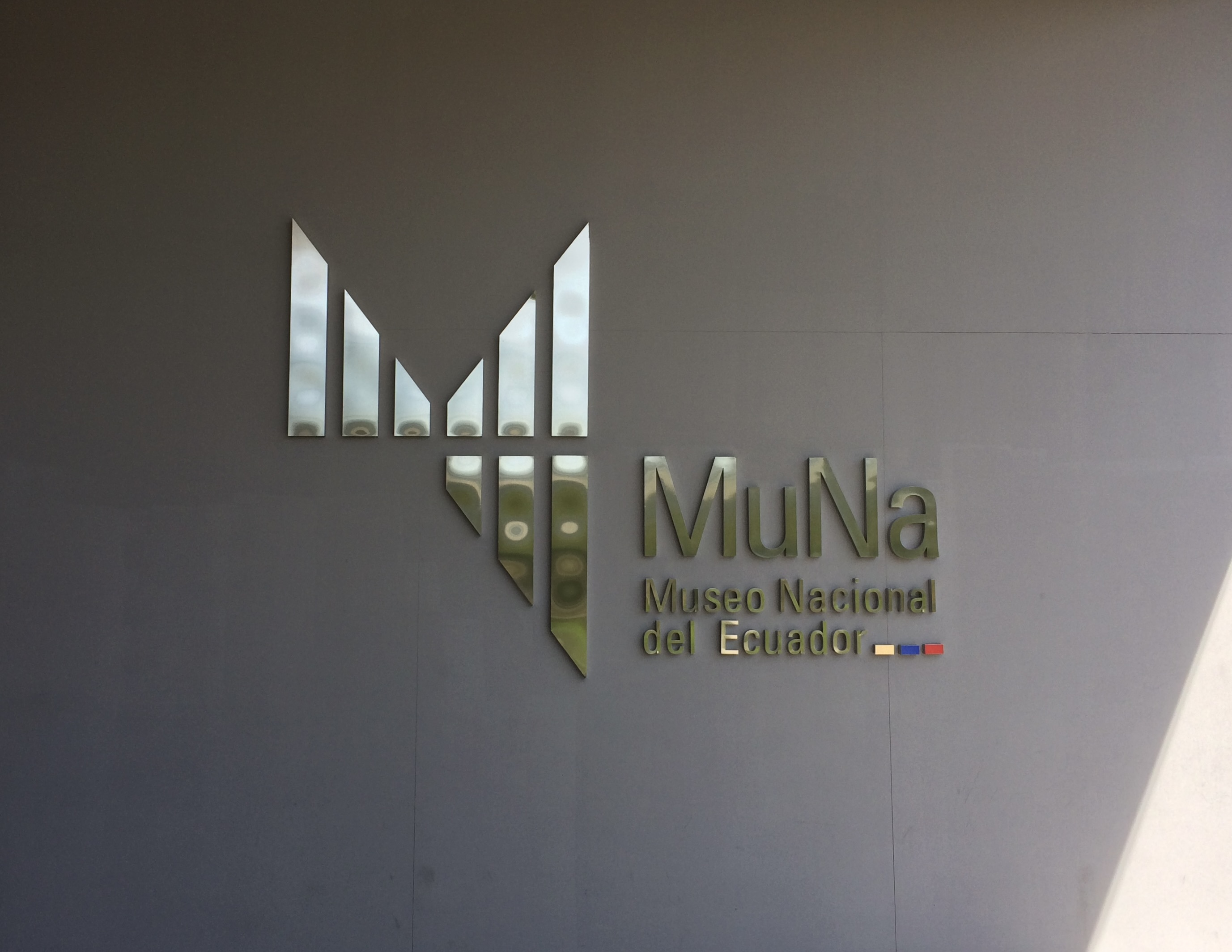

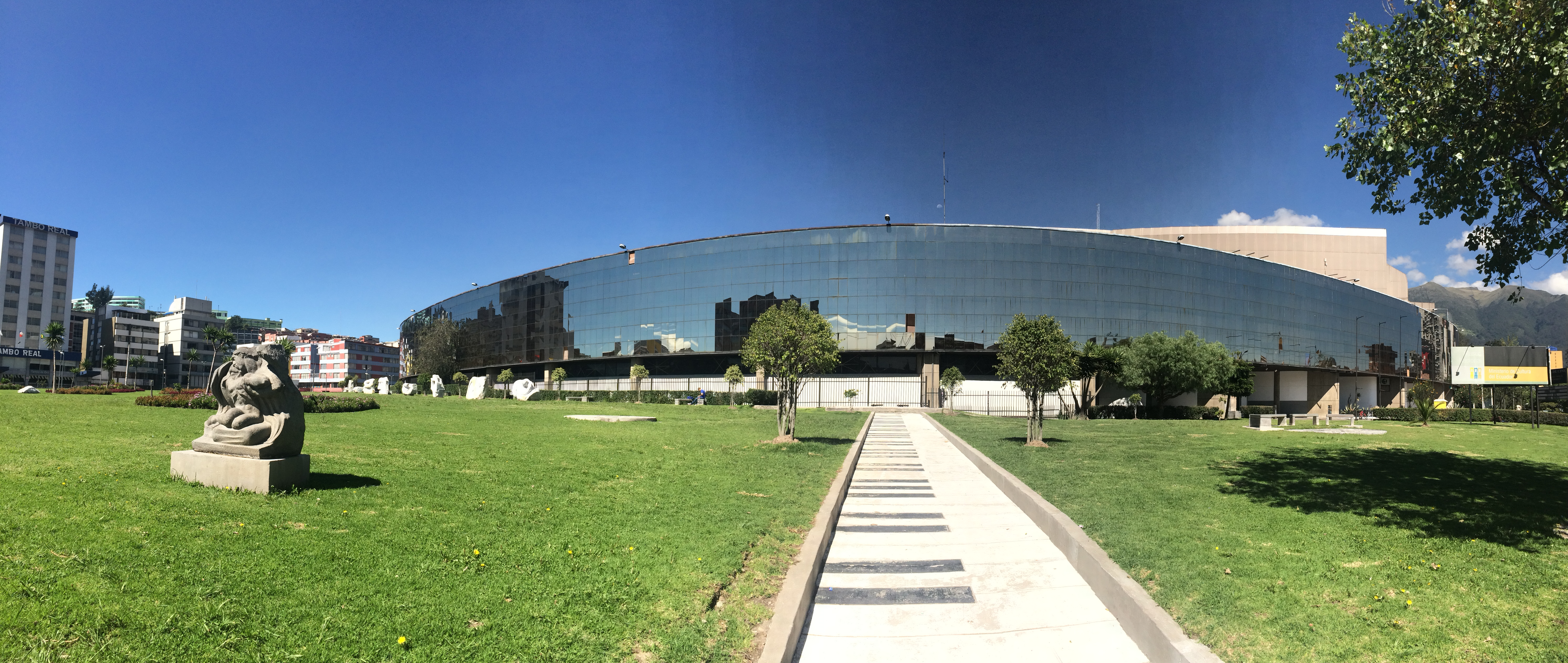
- The Building of Mirrors of the House of Ecuadorian Culture where the National Museum is located
- Established: 1 December 1969; 55 years ago (as the Museum of the Central Bank of Ecuador; the museum adopted its present name in 2010)
- Location: House of Ecuadorian Culture, Quito, Pichincha, Ecuador
- Coordinates: 0.210°S 78.495°W
- Type: National museum
- Executive director: María Fernanda Ponce Izurieta
- Owner: Ministry of Culture and Heritage
- Website: Official website

The National Museum of Ecuador (Spanish: Museo nacional del Ecuador, MuNa) is the national museum of Ecuador for archaeology and art. It leads the Network of Ecuadorian Museums governed by the Ministry of Culture and Heritage. The purpose of the museum is to preserve, exhibit and strengthen the cultural heritage and identity of Ecuador by supporting related research and educational activities.

The museum was originally established by the Central Bank of Ecuador in 1969 as the Museum of the Central Bank of Ecuador. In 2010, the cultural assets of the Central Bank were transferred to the Ministry of Culture and Heritage, and the museum adopted its current name.

The National Museum's collection contains over seventy thousand objects, about one percent of which is displayed in its permanent exhibitions in the House of Ecuadorian Culture in Quito, the capital of Ecuador.

== History ==
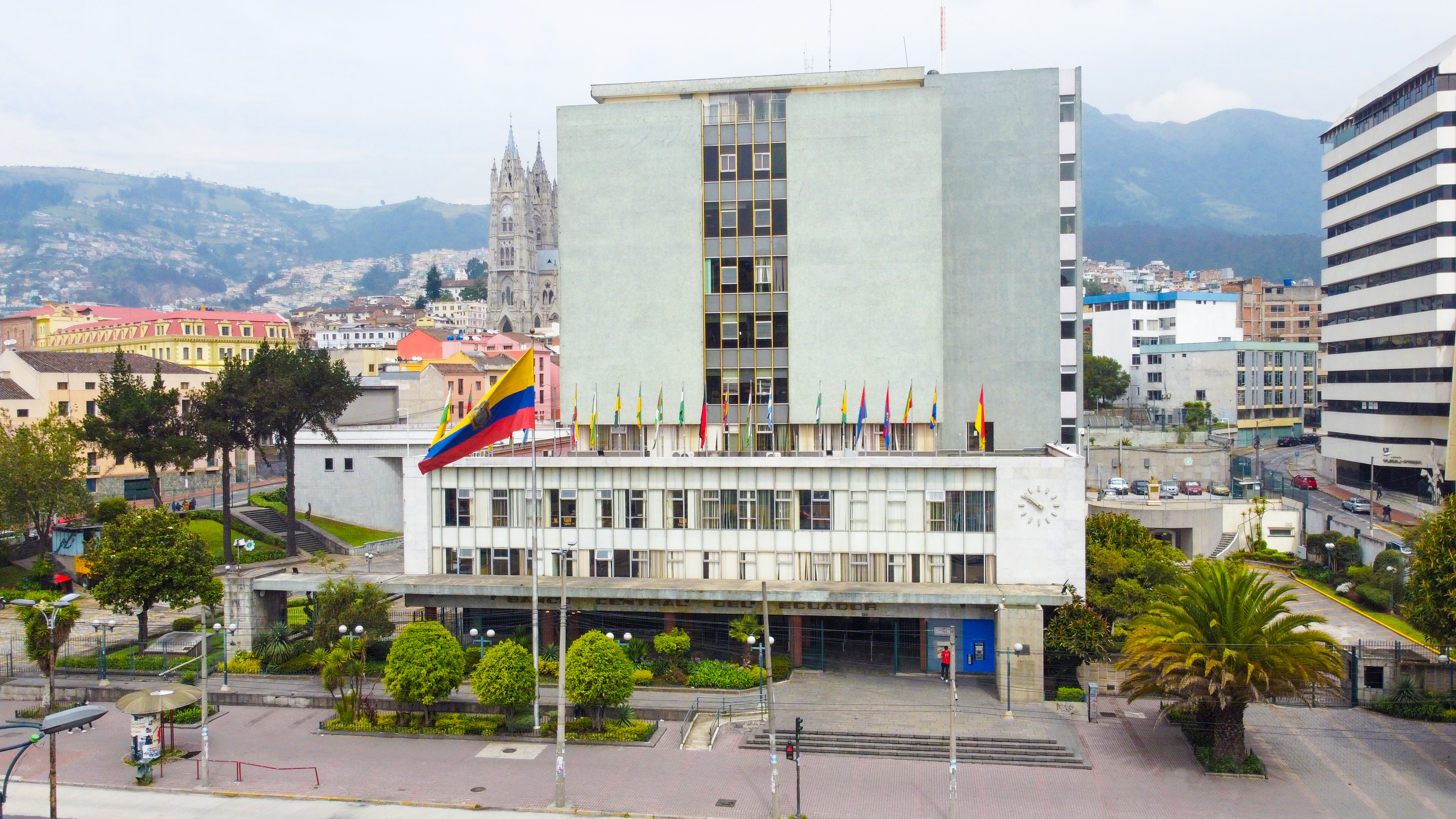
The Central Bank of Ecuador building in front of La Alameda Park in Quito, where the Museum of the Central Bank of Ecuador, predecessor of the National Museum of Ecuador, was located from 1969 to 1991.

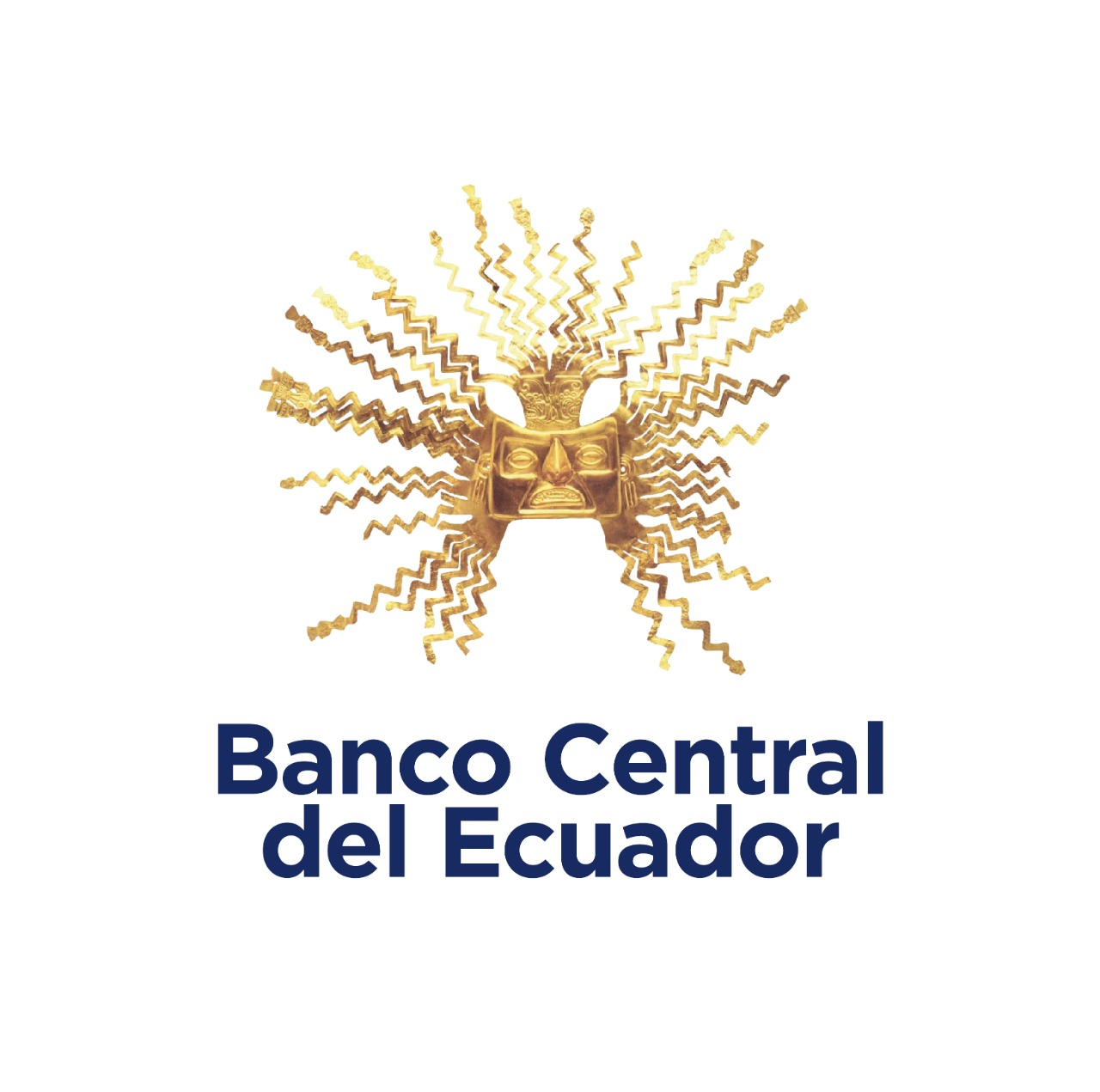
The golden sun of the La Tolita culture in the collection of the National Museum, as it appears in the logo of the Central Bank of Ecuador.

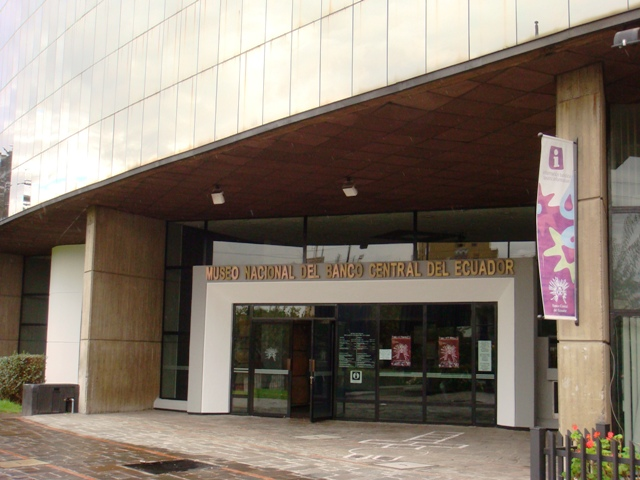
The entrance to the National Museum of the Central Bank of Ecuador, as it was known when this photograph was taken in 2009, at the House of Ecuadorian Culture.

=== Antecedents ===
The first attempt to establish a national museum in Ecuador occurred in 1839 during the presidency of Vicente Rocafuerte. It was located in the Colegio Máximo de los Jesuitas in Quito's historic centre, which is now the Centro Cultural Metropolitano. The project was not successful and in 1859, what remained of its collections was transferred to the Central University of Ecuador.

In 1917, President Alfredo Baquerizo decreed the establishment of a Museum of Archaeology and National Galleries of Painting and Sculpture. This institution was eventually inaugurated as the National Museum in 1929 by Minister of Public Education Manuel María Sánchez, and was located in Romo-Leroux Palace in Quito. In 1944, its collections were transferred to the newly established House of Ecuadorian Culture.

=== Museum of the Central Bank of Ecuador ===
When the Central Bank of Ecuador was created in 1927, it was required to maintain a gold standard. This led it to acquire a large quantity of gold objects, including many of archaeological value. The archaeological objects in its collection were presciently preserved by Julio Aráuz, director of the Bank's laboratory. In the late 1950s, as the Bank continued to acquire significant private collections of archaeological objects, including that of Max Konanz, collector of the golden sun of the La Tolita culture, the Bank's director Guillermo Pérez Chiriboga decided to open a museum that would help promote the culture of the Ecuadorian people. In this endeavour he was supported by the anthropologist Pedro Armillas, and the young architect Hernán Crespo Toral who would become the museum's founding director.

The Museum of the Central Bank of Ecuador opened on 1 December 1969, occupying the fifth and sixth floors of the Central Bank headquarters in Quito. Its full name was the Archaeological Museum and Art Galleries of the Central Bank of Ecuador (Spanish: Museo Arqueológico y Galerías de Arte del Banco Central del Ecuador). Originally intended to be a temporary location, the museum would stay in the Central Bank building for over two decades. The two floors housed a collection of archaeological objects, and a gallery of art from the colonial and postcolonial periods. The museum's early years coincided with Ecuador's oil boom, which allowed the museum to carry out archaeological and anthropological research across the country. The Central Bank also established a network of museums and cultural institutions in other Ecuadorian cities, organized under three cultural directorates headquartered in Quito, Guayaquil and Cuenca. Despite the inability of the museum's original premises to accommodate its ever-expanding collection, efforts to move the museum to a larger location did not come to fruition.

Ecuador's return to democracy in 1979 and the ensuing politicization of its public administration led to a period of decline for the museum, culminating in its closure in 1991.

=== Becoming the National Museum ===
In 1992 the museum was relocated to the House of Ecuadorian Culture, where it eventually reopened in 1995 as the National Museum of the Central Bank of Ecuador. In 2010, the Central Bank's cultural assets were transferred to the Ministry of Culture and Heritage, and the museum became simply known as the National Museum of Ecuador. The museum was closed in 2015 to make space for Habitat III, the United Nations conference on housing and sustainable urban development. It reopened in 2018 as the leading institution of the national network of museums administered by the Ministry of Culture and Heritage. At the same time it adopted its current logo designed by Peter Mussfeldt (1938–2021), a pioneer of Ecuadorian graphic design. Attendance peaked in 2019, when the museum received over 90,000 visitors. The museum was closed again from 2020 to 2021 during the COVID-19 pandemic, and the third floor of the museum remains closed due to a lack of funds for its maintenance.

In 2025, President Daniel Noboa announced the construction of a building dedicated to housing the National Museum in Quito. A lot measuring 13,000 m^{2} (140,000 sq ft) located at the corner of Avenida de la República and Avenida General Eloy Alfaro across from La Carolina Park and La Carolina metro station has been earmarked for the project.

== Collection and exhibitions ==
The collection of the National Museum of Ecuador includes over 63,000 archaeological objects as well as 8,000 other works of art, 99% of which is not on public display. Selected items from the museum's collection are currently organized into six permanent exhibitions on the following subjects:

- History of the museum, presenting the history of the National Museum and its predecessors, as well as the history of scientific investigation into Ecuador's past pioneered by figures such as Federico González Suárez and Jacinto Jijón y Caamaño.
- General themes, presenting four themes (plurinationalism and pluriculturalism, heritage and memory, rights and participation, and diversity) which guide the work of the Museum.
- Native societies, presenting objects from the indigenous societies of Ecuador and from the period of Inca expansion into Ecuador.
- Colony, presenting objects from the period of the Real Audiencia of Quito, including works of the Quito school, and the role of religious imagery in transmitting the Catholic faith.
- Republic, presenting objects from the birth of the Republic of Ecuador through the early 20th century, including works from the National School of Fine Arts of Quito founded in 1904.
- Modern and contemporary art, presenting works of Ecuadorian art from the 1920s onward and their role in the construction of a national identity.

The museum also has a hall for temporary exhibitions. Recent exhibitions have included retrospectives of Ecuadorian artists such as Olga Dueñas (2022), Judith Gutiérrez (2023), Miguel Varea (2024), and Oswaldo Viteri (2025).

== Management ==
Since 2018, the National Museum of Ecuador has been managed as a Decentralized Operating Entity (Entidad Operativa Desconcentrada) of the same name under the national Ministry of Culture and Heritage. This entity administers not only the National Museum itself, but also the following institutions in northern Ecuador:

- the Camilo Egas Museum in Quito's historic centre;
- the Esmeraldas Museum and Cultural Centre in Esmeraldas;
- the Ibarra Museum and Cultural Centre in Ibarra;
- the Imbabura Factory Cultural Complex in Atuntaqui; and
- the Mariscal Sucre Cultural Civic Centre, Museum and Library in Chillogallo, Quito.

== Gallery ==
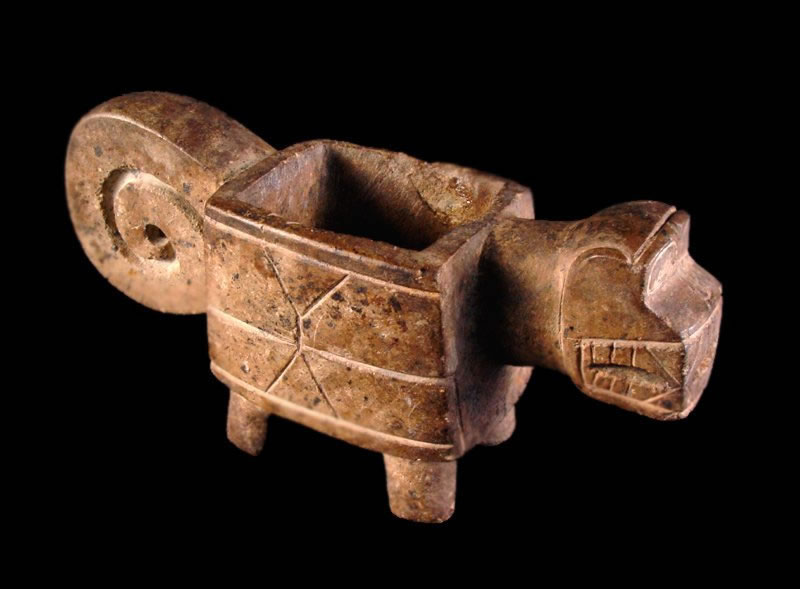
Ceremonial andesite mortar in the form of a jaguar of the Valdivia culture.

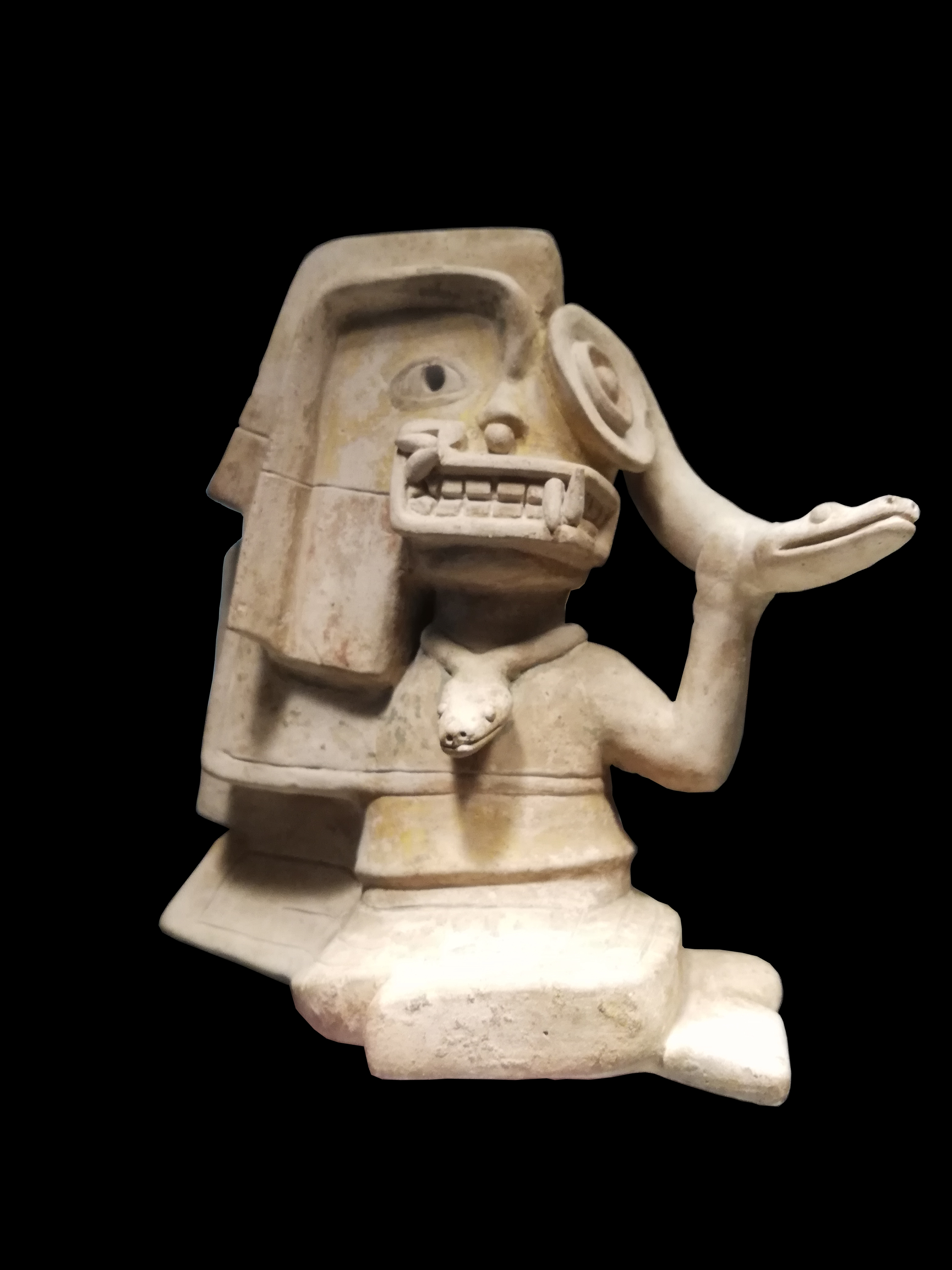
The "Picasso tolita", ceramic sculpture of the La Tolita culture.

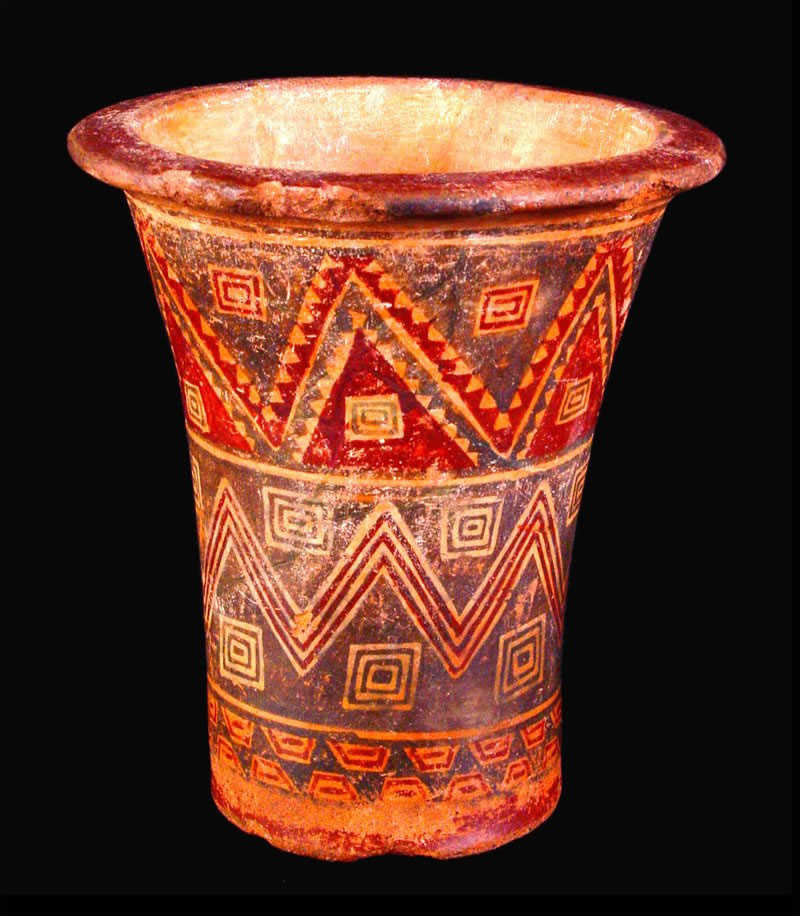
Polychrome wood qero of the Inca Empire, 16th century.

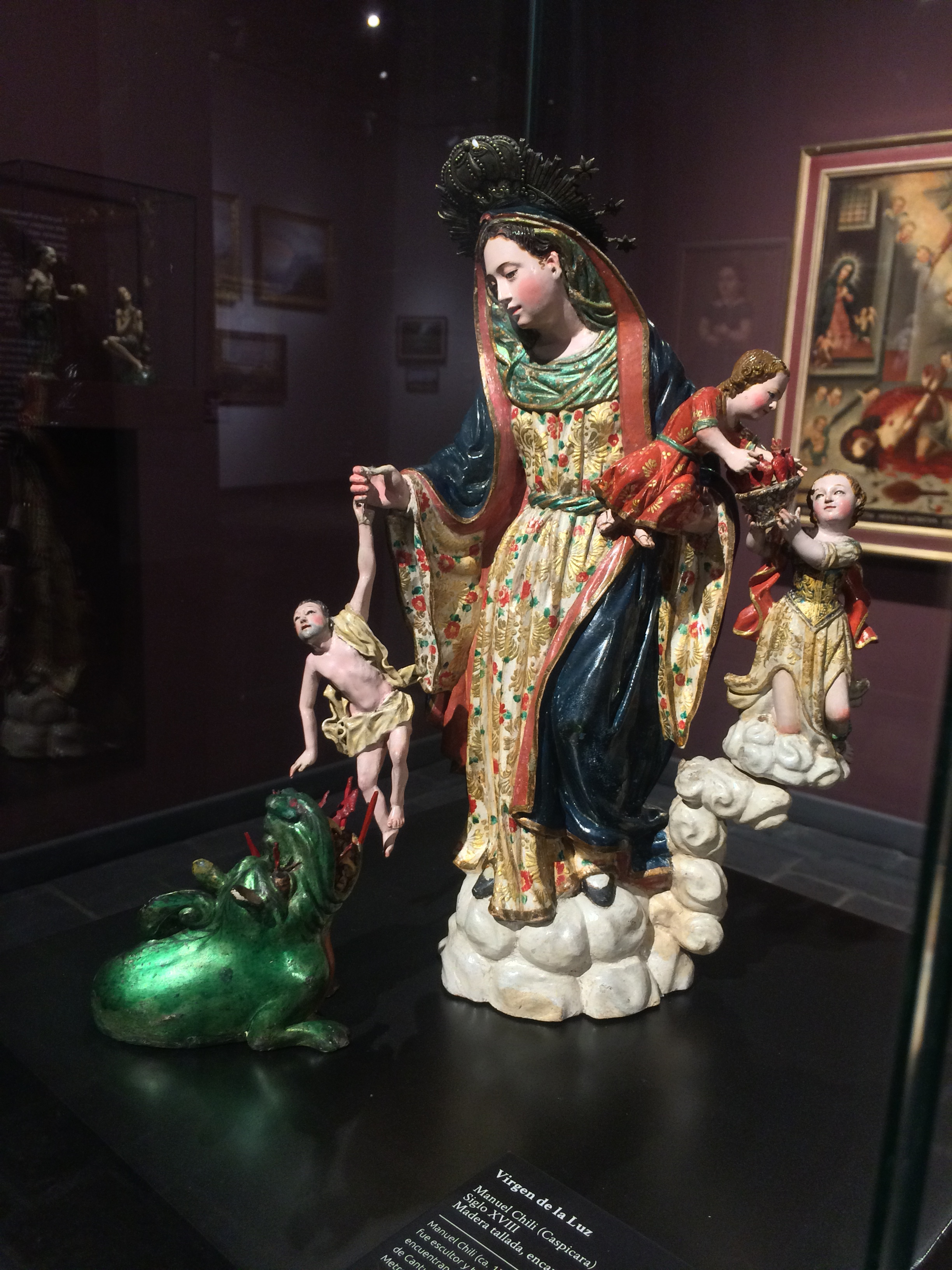
Virgen de la Luz, polychrome wood sculpture by Caspicara, 18th century.

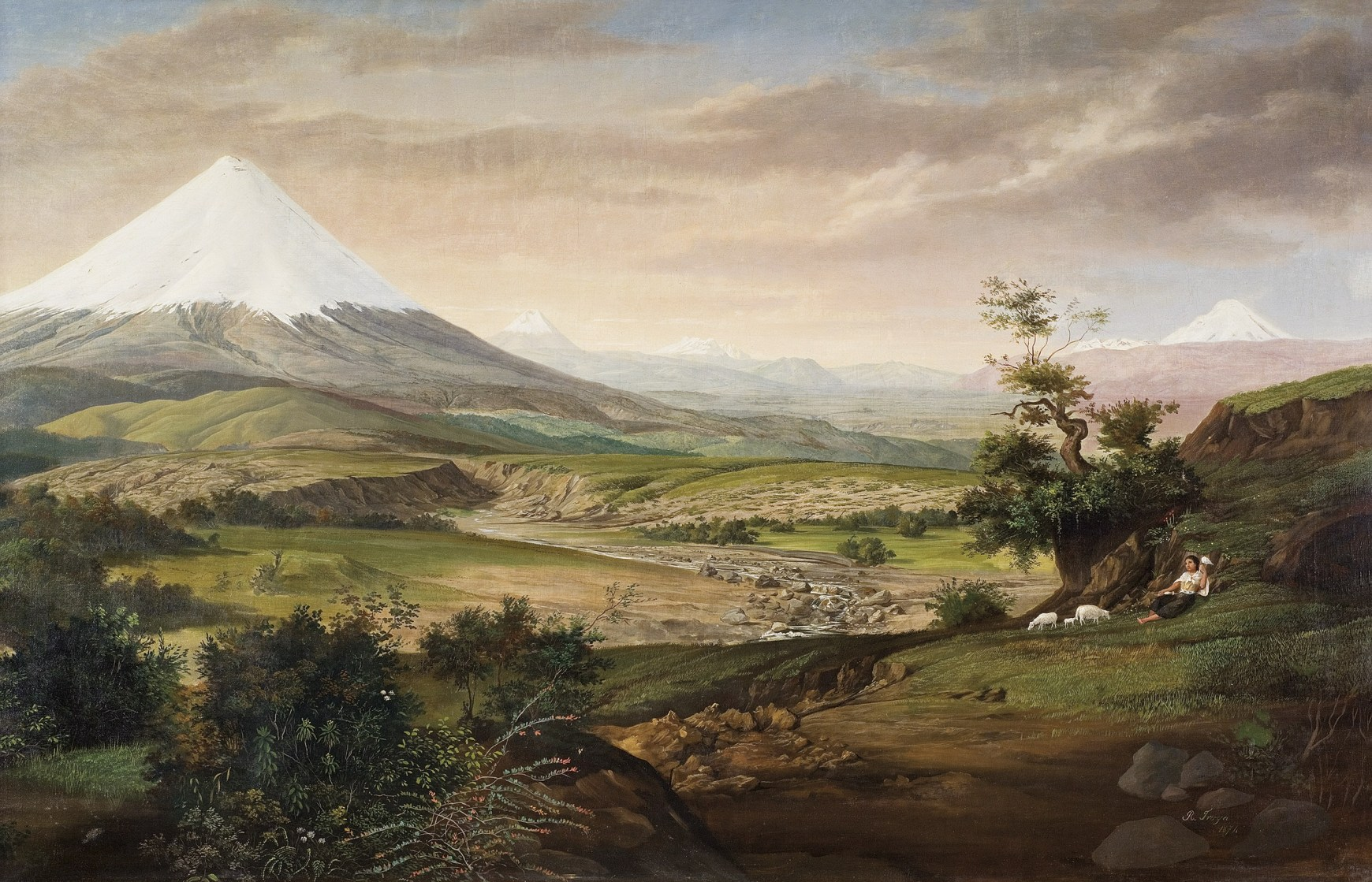
El Cotopaxi, oil painting by Rafael Troya, 1874.

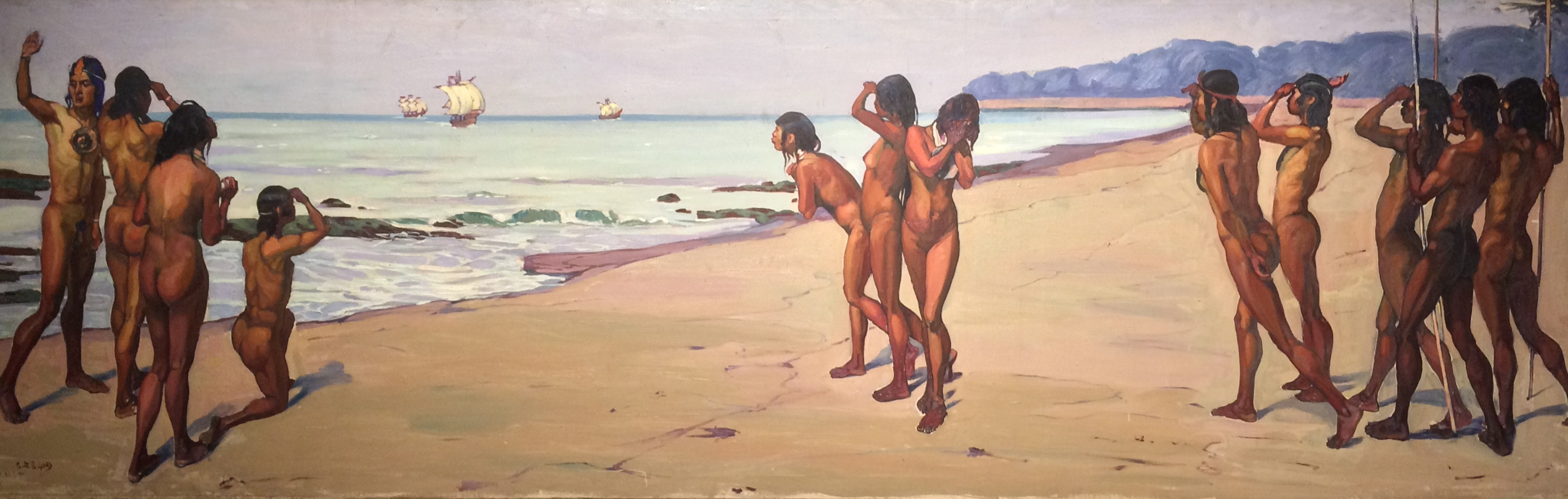
Llegada a América, oil painting by Camilo Egas, 1923.

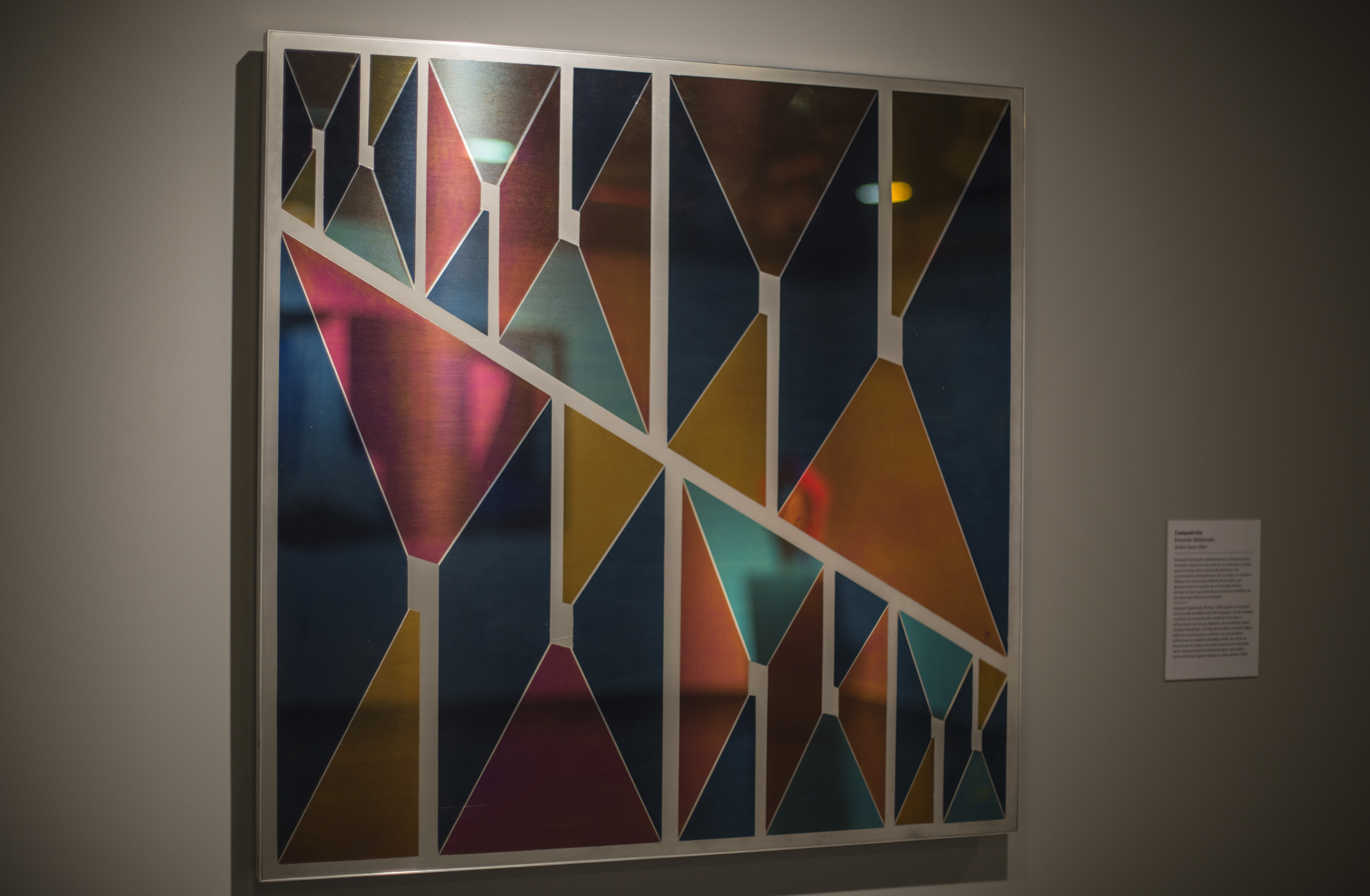
Composición, stainless steel panel by Estuardo Maldonado, 1976.
