= Norton Museum =

Norton Museum or Norton Gallery may refer to:

- Norton Museum of Art, West Palm Beach, Florida
- Norton Simon Museum, Pasadena, California
- R. W. Norton Art Gallery, a museum in Shreveport, Louisiana

== See also ==
- Chipping Norton Museum, Chipping Norton, Oxfordshire, England
- Presley Norton Museum (Museo Presley Norton), Guayaquil, Ecuador
