= Hernán Crespo Toral =

Ecuadorian architect, archeologist and museologist

Hernan Crespo Toral (December 8, 1937 – March 23, 2008) was an Ecuadorian architect, archeologist and museologist who played an important role in the conservation of cultural heritage in Ecuador.

== Biography ==
He studied museology at the École du Louvre in Paris on a scholarship from UNESCO, and returned to Ecuador in 1959 when he was 22 years old to use his knew knowledge in his homeland.

Crespo Toral worked for over 25 years at the Museums of the Central Bank of Ecuador, first as Founding Director of the Archaeological Museum and Art Galleries (nowadays the National Museum of Ecuador), and later as Director General of Museums of the Central Bank.

After working for the Museum of the Central Bank, he became the Assistant Director-General for Culture at UNESCO. Then in 1988 he was the Director of the UNESCO Regional Office for Culture in Latin America and the Caribbean, located in Havana, Cuba. In 1995, he moved Paris to work at the UNESCO headquarters, where his position was first Director of the Culture Sector (1995–1998) and then Assistant Director-General for Culture (1998–2000).

In 1991 Crespo Toral was awarded the Ecuadorian National Prize in Culture "Premio Eugenio Espejo" by the President of Ecuador.

Crespo Toral retired from UNESCO in 2000, he then served as an international consultant.
