= Evermont Hope Norton =

American businessman

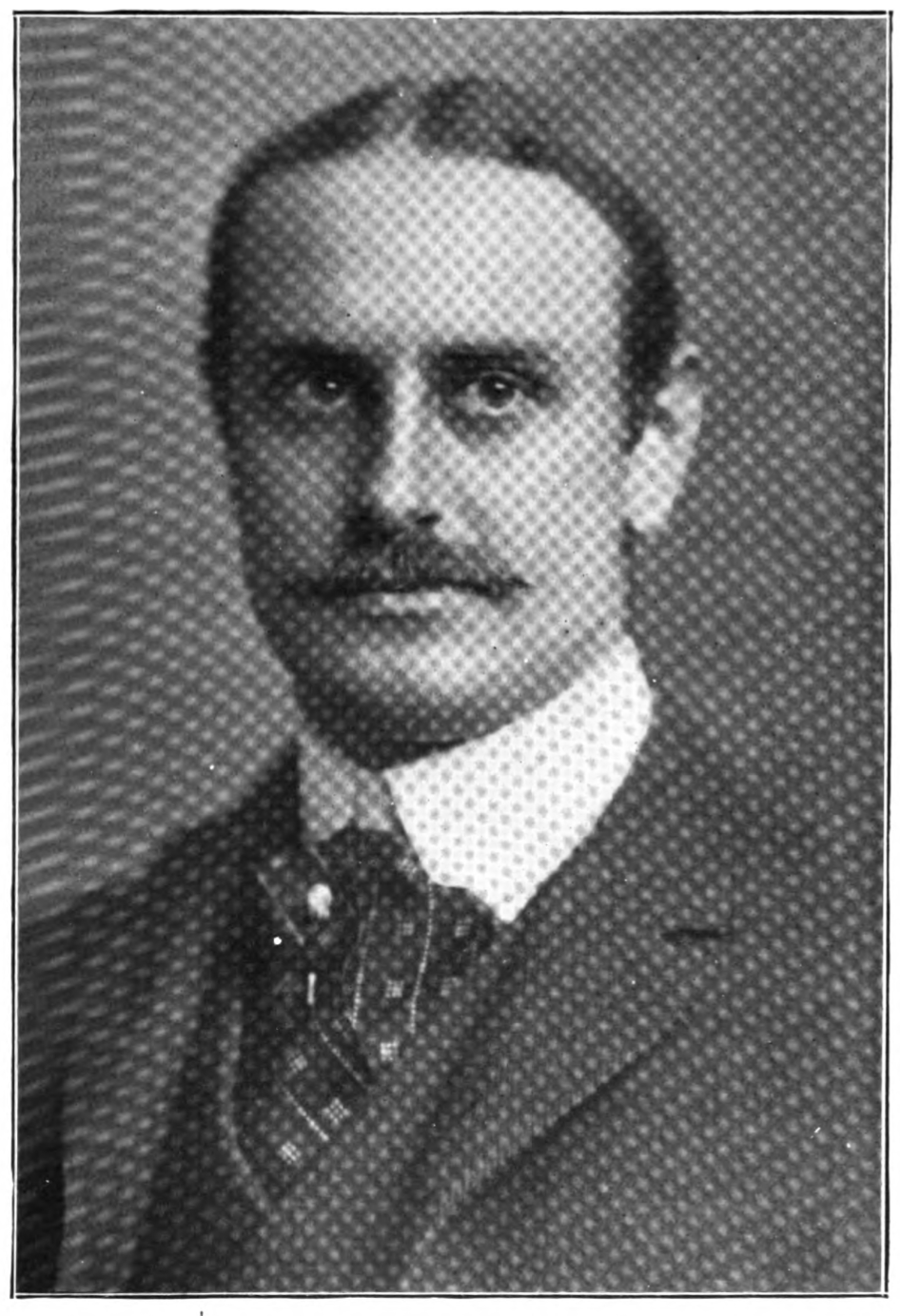
- Evermont Hope Norton, c. 1899
- Born: October 10, 1873; Louisville, Kentucky, United States
- Died: April 4, 1960 (aged 86)
- Occupations: Stock broker; Railroad tycoon
- Spouses: Lily Bouvier Morison; Marionne Vosburgh (m. 1898–1985) Mary Morrison Carr (m. 1876–1941)

Evermont Hope Norton (1873–1960) was a stock broker and railroad tycoon from Richmond, Virginia.

== Biography ==
Norton was one of five sons of Presley Evermont Norton and Lillie Hope. He studied law at the University of Virginia from 1891 to 1895 where he was a member of Beta Theta Pi. The year after he graduated, he began work in Wall Street, where he had a successful early career as a stockbroker as a founding member of Norton & Tunstall (later E. H. Norton & Co).

In 1897, Norton became director and vice-president of the Michigan Traction Company, following his father into the railroad business. In 1899, he became director and president of the Ecuador Development Company, director of the Guayaquil and Quito Railway Company, and vice-president and director of the American Zinc Mining Company. He later became president and chairman of the Ecuadorian Corporation, Ltd. and the International Products Corporation.

Under Norton's leadership, the Guayaquil and Quito Railway Company built the Ecuadorian Railroad, running from the Pacific Coast city of Guayaquil over the Andes Mountains to Quito. In 1911, Norton moved to South America to manage his railway.

Norton served in Naval Intelligence in World War I. When he later sold his shares of the railway company to the Ecuadorian government he purchased the Guayaquil Brewery (Cervecería de Guayaquil).

Norton was the grandfather of the Ecuadorian archeologist Presley Norton Yoder.
