= Judith Gutiérrez =

Ecuadorian painter (1927–2003)

- Born: 22 December 1927; Babahoyo, Ecuador
- Died: 1 March 2003 (aged 75); Guadalajara, Mexico
- Known for: Painting
- Movement: Modern Primitivism

Judith Gutiérrez Moscoso (22 December 1927 – 1 March 2003) was an Ecuadorian painter who lived and worked in Ecuador and Mexico. Along with other female artists, she formed part of the Guayaquil School for Contemporary Plastic Arts (Escuela de Guayaquil en las Artes Plásticas Contemporáneas) and was active in militant groups such as the Union of the Women of Guayas (Unión de Mujeres del Guayas), a precursor to Ecuadorian feminist organizations.

In 1964, after Gutiérrez' first solo exhibitions at Ecuadorian galleries such as the Casa de la Cultura "Benjamín Carrión" in Quito, her second husband, the writer Miguel Donoso Pareja, was captured along with other intellectuals by Ecuador's military regime. She accompanied him to Mexico when the regime expelled him there, and she remained there for long periods of her career.

In 1982, Gutiérrez was invited by the Ecuadorian government to exhibit some of her paintings in the National Museum of the Central Bank of Ecuador. This was her first major showing after her return to Ecuador.

She died in Guadalajara, Jalisco, Mexico of a heart attack.

== Early life and education ==
Gutierrez was born on 22 December 1927 in Babahoyo, Ecuador. She was raised Catholic. At an early age her father, a sailor and agriculturalist, sent her to a convent in the Andean city of Riobamba, 30 km from the base of the Chimborazo volcano. The Mexican writer Juan Hadatty Saltos argued that her religious background coupled with the colors and images of the countryside where spent her childhood, greatly influenced her painting style.

== Influences ==
She studied at the School of Fine Arts in Guayaquil, Ecuador, where her most influential professor was Caesar Andrade Faini, someone with whom she had also established a "great friendship," according to scholars writing after her death. Her studies under Faini, which took place after the end of her first marriage, led to a series of early exhibitions in both Guayaquil and Quito.

Gutiérrez worked within a school described by El Universo as "modern primitivist," rejecting European forms in favor of natural, essential ones. The natural forms and Christian themes in her work, would intensify upon her move to Mexico and became one of the major motifs in her career, as exemplified by the Paraísos, paintings of Eden-like gardens with groups of nude figures.

== Important works ==
Along with the Paraíso and Nocturno series, some of Gutierrez's other major works are: Dancer's Memory of the Artist, Book for The Blind, and The Christ of Santa Elena.

== Major themes ==
Historia de un caballo, a 1995 work, highlights Gutiérrez's flat style and depiction of nature in her work.

Gutiérrez worked in multiple media including painting, sculpture, graphics, decoratives and applied installation. She also made puppets, costumes, and scenery for puppet shows. Gutierrez was known for ingenious composition of figures, incorporating symbols, mystical scenes, as well as some Byzantine characteristics ("Bizantino Tropical" as an art critic once suggested): nature, men, women, the cosmos, are all the general components of her works.

The critic Jorge Dávila Vásquez said that her work featured "the primitivism of those furtive encounters of man with the little demons of his childhood, nurtured by the religious Christian imaginary."

== Exhibitions ==
Gutierrez held numerous individual exhibitions and is represented in many galleries and museums in New York, Los Angeles, Chicago, Pasadena, Washington, Great Britain, Osaka, Guayaquil, Quito, Mexico City, Munich, Havana, Guadalajara, Monterrey, Panamá, and São Paulo.
