= Eduardo Kingman =

Ecuadorian artist

- Born: Eduardo Kingman Riofrío; February 23, 1913; Loja, Ecuador
- Died: November 27, 1998 (aged 85); Quito, Ecuador
- Education: Escuela de Bellas Artes, Quito; San Francisco Art Institute
- Known for: Painting, printmaking
- Notable work: Los Guandos
- Movement: Indigenism
- Awards: Premio Eugenio Espejo (1986)

Eduardo Kingman Riofrío (February 23, 1913 – November 27, 1997) was an Ecuadorian artist. He is considered one of Ecuador's greatest artists of the 20th century, among the art circles of other master artists such as Oswaldo Guayasamín and Camilo Egas.

== Background ==
Kingman was born in Loja, Ecuador on February 23, 1913. His father, Edward Kingman, had moved to Ecuador from Newton, Connecticut. Kingman was the elder brother of journalist Nicolás Kingman Riofrío.

Kingman first studied at the Escuela de Bellas Artes, in Quito, under Victor Mideros. Further studies took him to Venezuela, Peru, Bolivia; and finally to the San Francisco Art Institute, California (from 1945 to 1946).

== Art career ==
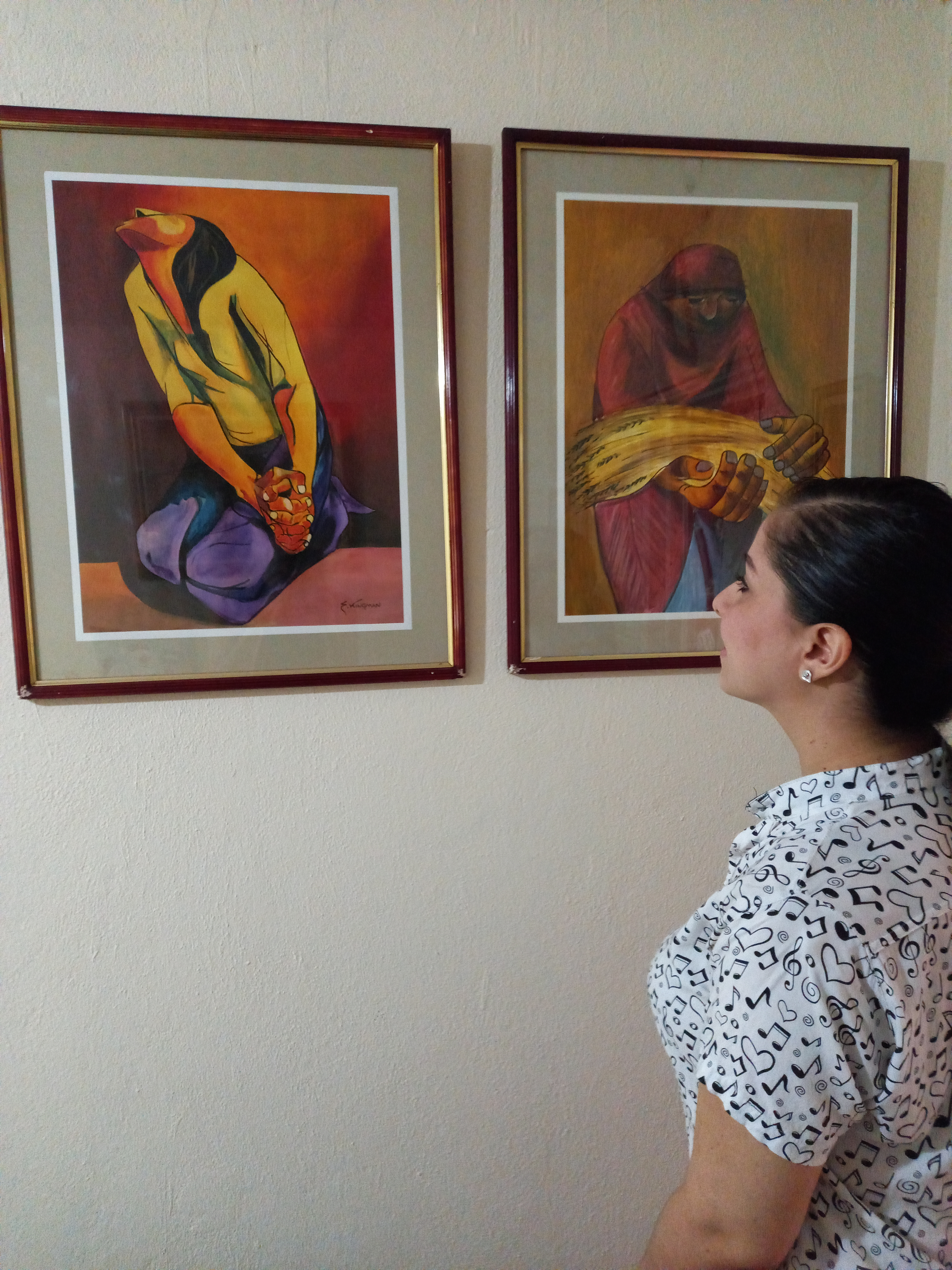
Kingman Paintings

People from the United States first became acquainted with Kingman's art in 1939, when he assisted Camilo Egas with the paintings and decorations for the Ecuadorian Pavilion at the New York World's Fair.

For a period of twenty years, Eduardo Kingman held the post of principal professor at Quito's Escuela de Bellas Artes (School of Fine Arts) as well as Director of the Museo de Arte Colonial de Quito. In 1940, Kingman founded the Caspicara Gallery in Quito. At this time and later his original prints and paintings were exhibited internationally in such cities as Paris, Washington, D.C., San Francisco, Mexico City, Caracas and Bogotá. Near the end of his career, Kingman was honored with a one-man exhibition of his art at the United Nations, New York City.

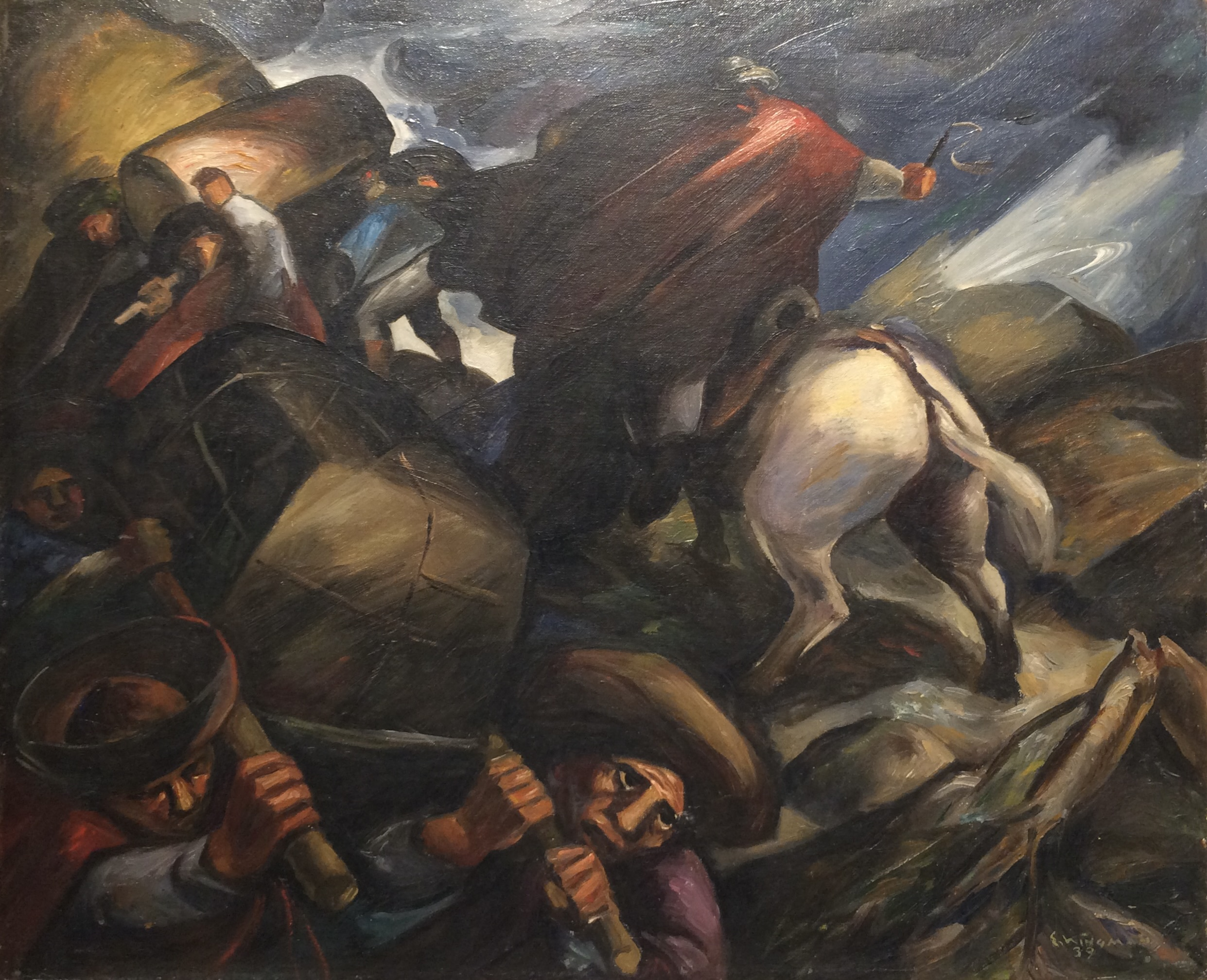
Los Guandos (1939), oil painting. MuNa, Quito.

The unifying theme of Kingman's paintings, lithographies and woodcuts in expressing the social realities of Ecuador's indigenous peoples. He was known as "the painter of hands."

Kingman was also active as a writer and social activist.

He died in Quito in 1998. Two of his paintings were stolen from the Posada de las Artes Kingman Museum in 2003 but were safely recovered.

== Published works ==
- Albornoz, Miguel and Eduardo Kingman. Orellana: El Caballero de las Amazonas. Editorial Herrero (1965). ASIN B001FCLO4I.
- Icaza, Jorge, author. Kingman, Eduardo, illustrator. Huairapamushcas. Quito : Casa de la Cultura Ecuatoriana, 1948.
- El Choclo the Corn

== See also ==
- Culture of Ecuador
- List of Ecuadorian artists
