= La Alameda Park, Quito =

Park in Quito, Ecuador

Coordinates: 0.2149°S 78.5026°W

La Alameda Park is a park in Quito.

This park is shaped like a triangle bordered by the streets Gran Colombia, Sodiro and 10 de Agosto. It is the oldest park in the city, its composition dates from 1596 with an area of 6.3 hectares. The park is also known as 'Chuquihuada'.

The park houses the "Churo," one of the oldest lookouts in the area, dating back to colonial times. The name "churo" refers to the shape of a snail.

Inside of this park, the Quito Astronomical Observatory was established in 1864, the first astronomical observatory in South America. At the time of construction, it was the most gifted of South America and still has the instrumentation of the time. The park is filled with monuments, one of the most famous among these is the sculpture built in honor of the French Geodesic Mission and to Bolivar.

The Alameda Park is a traditional gathering place in Quito, and its natural lagoon provides a place of relaxation for the city’s inhabitants. Inside the park, there are many species of trees such as palm trees, acacias, redwoods, toct, cedar and ash. The oldest tree of Alameda is a 120-year-old macrocarpa cypress.

In 1963, The Government of Ecuador transferred the title of the Observatory to the National Polytechnic School.

One of the oldest observatories in South America is the Quito Astronomical Observatory and is located 12 minutes south of the Equator in Quito, Ecuador. The Quito Astronomical Observatory is the National Observatory of Ecuador and is located in the Historic Center of Quito and is managed by the EPN.

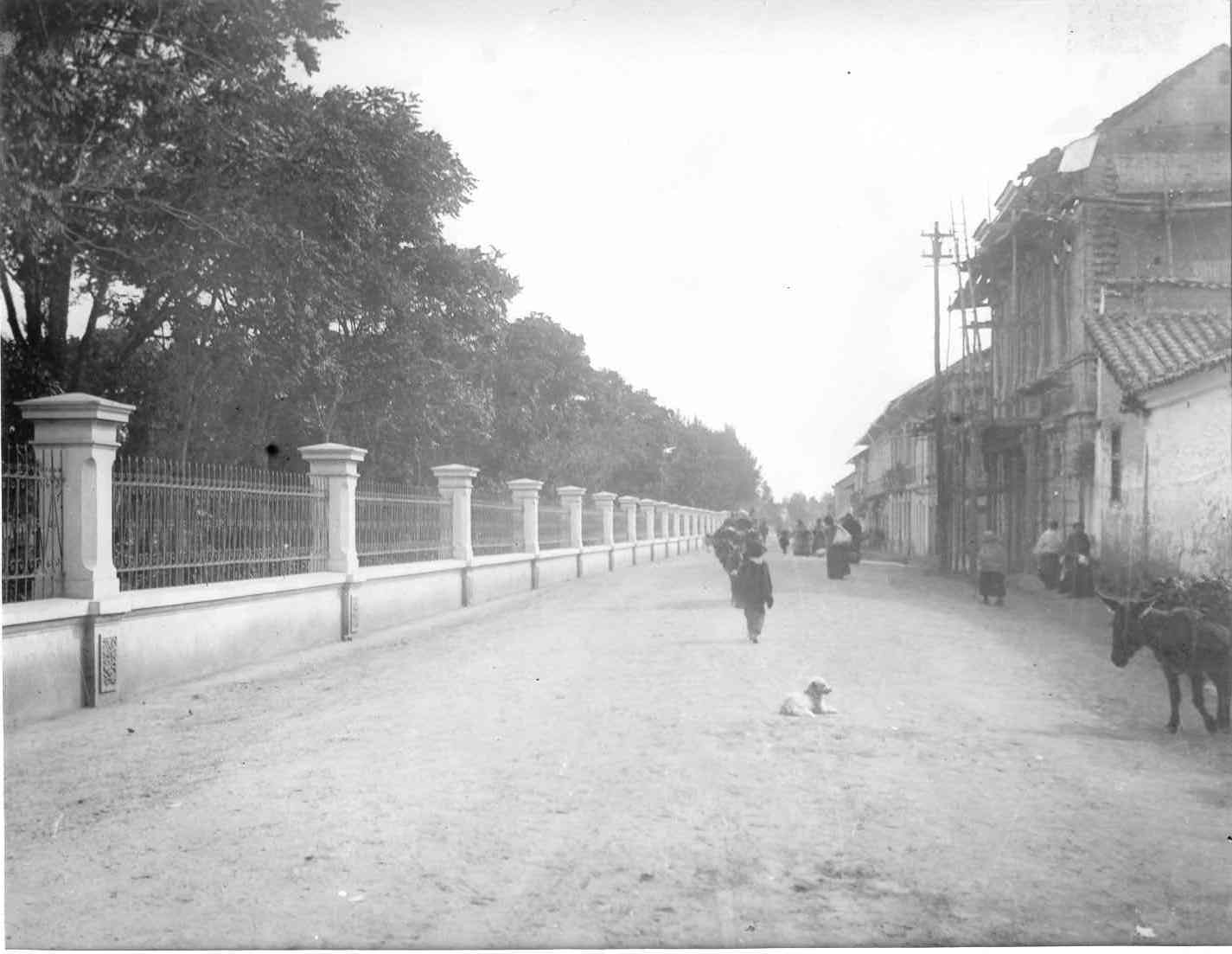
An old photo of Alameda Park

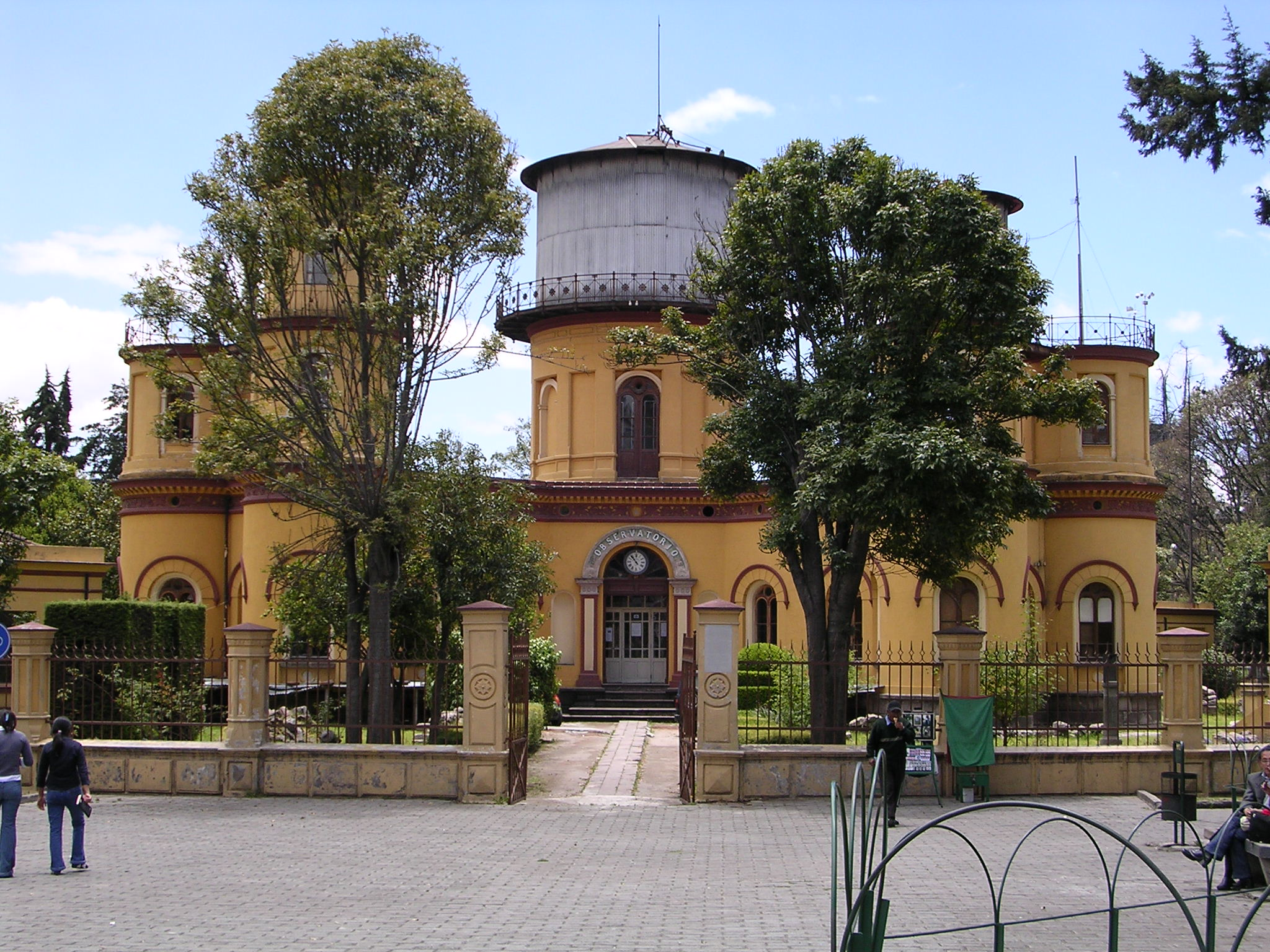
The Quito Astronomical Observatory was founded in 1873 and is located at La Alameda Park.

The Quito Astronomical Observatory (Spanish: Observatorio Astronómico de Quito – OAQ) is a research institute of EPN, the National Polytechnic School in Quito, Ecuador. Its major research fields are astronomy and atmospheric physics.

The La Alameda metro station is located at the southern edge of the park.

== Activities and services ==
One of the oldest observatories in South America is the Quito Astronomical Observatory. Perfect for tourists and a short drive to all the hotels, The Quito Astronomical Observatory has been perfectly restored and is open for tourists.

The activities and services currently provided by the OAQ are:

- Night observations by telescopes
- Museum
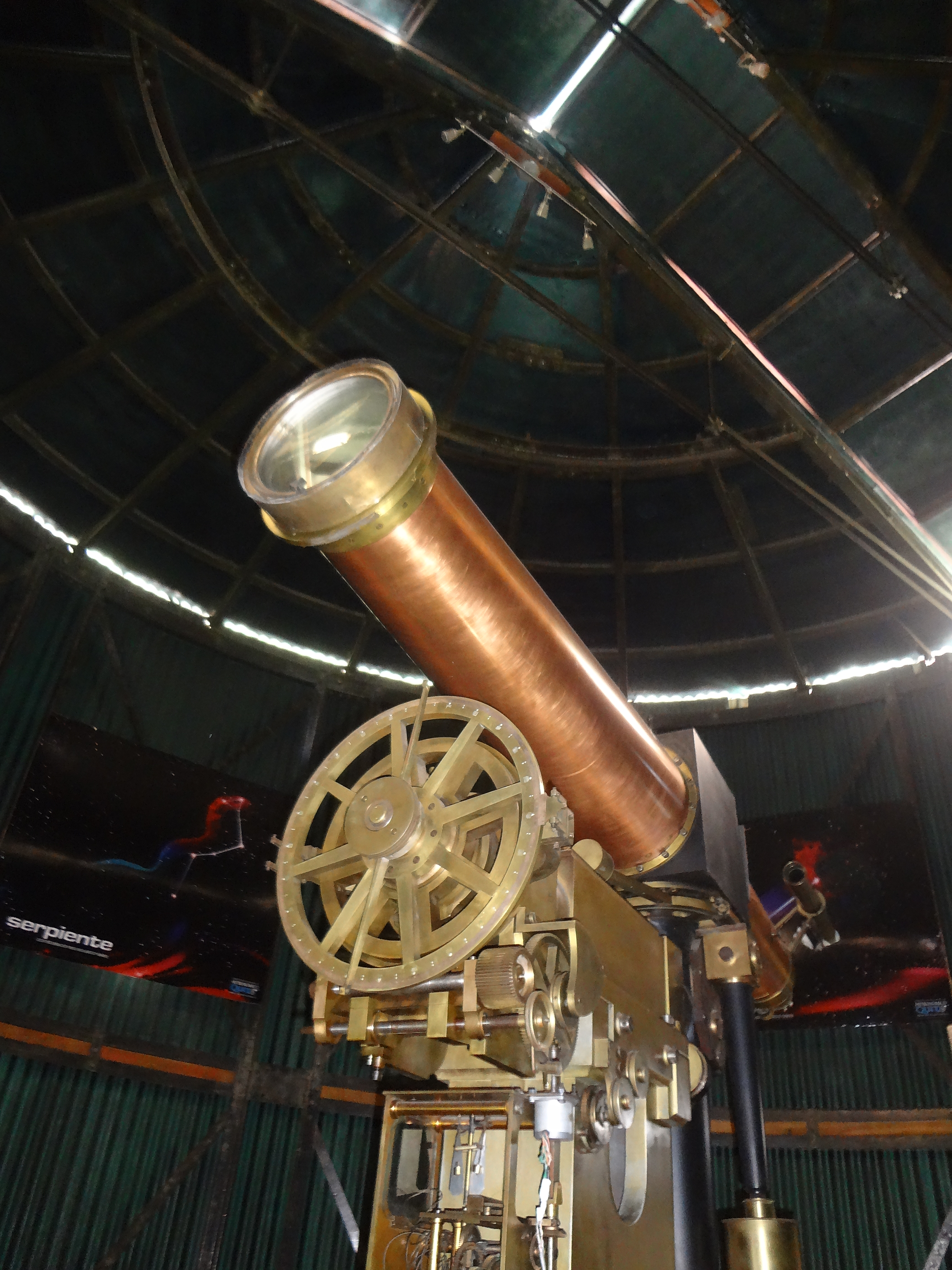
