= National Polytechnic School (Ecuador) =

Public university in Quito, Ecuador

- (Spanish: Escuela Politécnica Nacional)
- Motto: "E scientia hominis salus" (in Latin)
- Type: Public university
- Established: 1869; 157 years ago
- Rector: Florinella Muñoz, PhD
- Undergraduates: 10,000
- Postgraduates: 2,500
- Other students: 7,000
- Location: Quito, Pichincha, Ecuador; 0°12′38″S 78°29′20″W
- Campus: Urban, 152,000 square metres (38 acres)
- Mascot: Owl
- Website: epn.edu.ec (in 5 languages)

The National Polytechnic School (Spanish: Escuela Politécnica Nacional), also known as EPN, is a public university in Quito, Ecuador. The campus, named after José Rubén Orellana, is located in the east-central part of Quito. It occupies an area of 15.2 hectares (38 acres) and has a built area of around 62,000 metres^{2}. Its student body numbers approximately 10,000, of which thirty percent are women. The main campus encompasses ten teaching and research faculties, in addition to four technical and specialized institutes. EPN was founded in 1869 with the aim of becoming the first technical and technological center in the country. Since its beginnings, EPN adopted the polytechnic university model, which stresses laboratory instruction in applied science and engineering. At the campus, there are some libraries with content primarily oriented to engineering and scientific topics.

EPN has been consistently ranked among the top universities (the so-called Group A) in Ecuador by CEAACES.

== History ==
The National Polytechnic School was founded on August 27, 1869, by the National Convention of Ecuador and the former Ecuadorian President Gabriel García Moreno. EPN is the second-oldest public university in Ecuador, after Central University of Ecuador.

For this purpose, García Moreno hired members of a German Jesuit religious order to manage the university and the Quito Astronomical Observatory. Juan Bautista Menten, Louis Dressel, Theodor Wolf, Joseph Kolberg and Luis Sodiro were among the first scientists who taught at the EPN. It received the name of "Instituto Superior Politecnico", and Menten was its first director; some other notable professors included Emilio Muellendorf, Armando Wenzel, Cristian Boetzkes, José Epping, Eduardo Brugier, Luis Heiss, Alberto Claessen, P. Clemente Faller; and Joseph Honshteter. The newborn institution was conceived as the first research center of Ecuador and was created with the purpose of contributing to the scientific and technological development of the country. These academics excelled in several fields such as cartography and mineralogy (Wolf), Chemistry (Dressel), Botany (Sodiro), Architecture (Kolberg), and other fields of engineering. The advent of electricity to the city of Quito was in part the work of Kolberg and Brugier.

The university was closed by President Borrero in 1876 and remained closed for some decades. In February 1935, President José María Velasco Ibarra re-opened it and in 1946 the name was changed to Escuela Politecnica Nacional. In 1964, the university moved from its old campus near the La Alameda park to its current campus in El Giron, which was named after former Rector José Rubén Orellana Ricaurte. EPN offers many degrees in engineering and science including civil engineering, electric and electronic engineering, mechanical engineering, power electronics, petroleum engineering, chemical engineering, bio-agricultural engineering, food technology, geology, informatics engineering, mathematics and physics. In addition to science and engineering degrees, EPN also started offering technical and technological degrees, with the School of Information and Technology being founded in 1967.

== Faculties ==
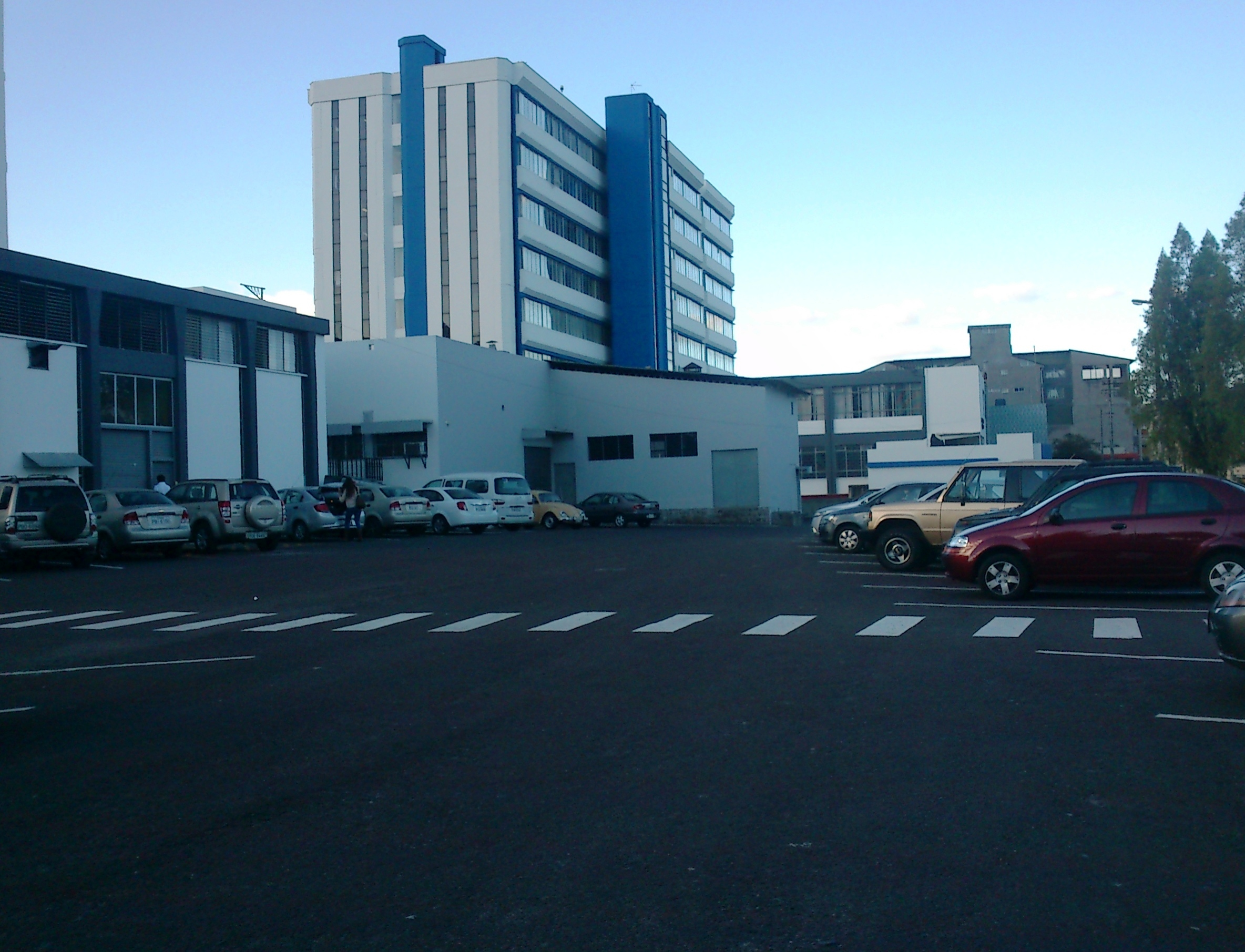
Faculty of Electrical Engineering.

The university has 8 faculties that house 24 professional undergraduate schools, 18 master's degrees and 6 postgraduate doctorates. These specialties belong to the field of knowledge of science, engineering and technical training school (ESFOT). All professional faculties, except the Technical Training School, offer masters and doctorates in various fields of specialization.

- Administrative Sciences
- Chemical Engineering and Agro-Industry
- Civil and Environmental Engineering
- Computer Science Engineering
- Electrical and Electronics Engineering
- Geology and Petroleum
- Mechanical Engineering
- Exact Sciences: Mathematics, Physics

=== Technical Training School ===
The Technical Training School (ESFOT) has been in operation since 1967 and has a focus on Computer Networking, Telecommunications networking and teaching all about Computer programming and how computers exchange data.

== Volcanic monitoring ==
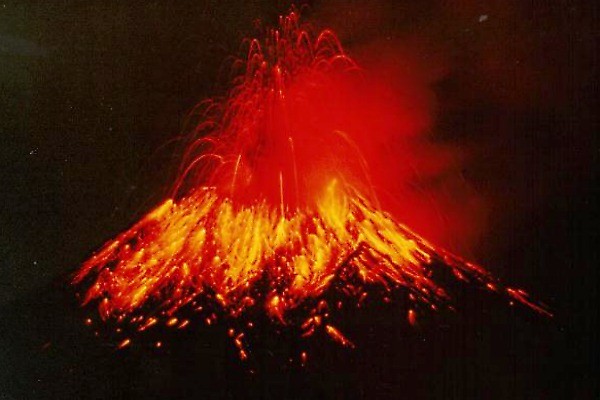
Tungurahua spewing hot lava and ash at night (1999)

In Ecuador, the National Polytechnic School department provides monitoring of volcanic activity in this mountainous Andean nation. Cotopaxi is a stratovolcano in the Andes Mountains, located about 50 km (31 mi) south of Quito, Ecuador, South America. It is the second highest summit in the country, reaching a height of 5,897 m (19,347 ft). Some consider it the world's highest active volcano, while others give this status to the considerably higher Llullaillaco, which most recently erupted in 1877 and is one of Ecuador's most active volcanoes. Since 1738, Cotopaxi has erupted more than 50 times, resulting in the creation of numerous valleys formed by lahars (mudflows) around the volcano.

In October 1999, the Pichincha volcano erupted in Quito and covered the city with several inches of ash. Prior to that, the last major eruptions were in 1553 and in 1660, when about 30 cm of ash fell on the city.

At 5,230 meters (17,160 ft), Sangay Volcano) is an active stratovolcano in central Ecuador and is one of the highest active volcanoes in the world and one of Ecuador's most active ones, erupting three times in recorded history. It exhibits mostly strombolian activity; the most recent eruption, which started in 1934, is still ongoing. Geologically, Sangay marks the southern bound of the Northern Volcanic Zone, and its position straddling two major pieces of crust accounts for its high level of activity. Sangay's approximately 500,000-year-old history is one of instability; two previous versions of the mountain were destroyed in massive flank collapses, evidence of which still litters its surroundings today. Sangay is one of two active volcanoes located within the namesake Sangay National Park, the other being Tungurahua to the north. As such it has been listed as a UNESCO World Heritage Site since 1983.

Reventador is an active stratovolcano that lies in the eastern Andes of Ecuador. Since 1541 it has erupted over 25 times with most recent eruption in 2009, but the largest historical eruption occurred in 2002. During that eruption the plume from the volcano reached a height of 17 km (11 mi) and pyroclastic flows went up to7 km (4.3 mi) from the cone. On March 30, 2007, the mountain spewed ash again. The ash reached a height of about two miles (3.2 km; 11,000 ft).

Cotopaxi, outside of Quito, began activity in April 2015; the volcano began to show signs of unrest, and came back to life. There was a large increase in earthquakes (including harmonic tremors) and SO_{2} emissions. IGPEN reported slight deformation of the edifice, suggesting an intrusion of magma under the volcano. As of 25 July 2015, the unrest continued, and the most recent major eruption was an ash and steam eruption that occurred on August 14 and 15, 2015.

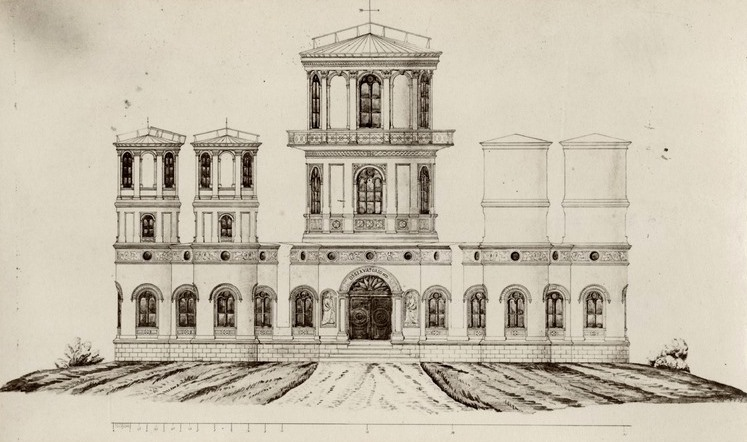
QUITO OBSERVATORY. Artistic conception of the observatory, according to Ludwig Dressel (1873).

== Gustavo Orcés V. Natural History Museum ==
The Gustavo Orcés V. Natural History Museum is part of the Life Sciences Institute on the campus of the National Polytechnic School. The main focus is conducting research on Ecuadorian fauna in the fields of biodiversity, ecology, zoology, and environmental impact assessments, and contributing to national environmental culture through the Gustavo Orces Natural History Museum.

The museum has the remains of the only complete mammoth found in Ecuador.

== See also ==
- List of astronomical observatories
- List of universities in Ecuador
