= Quito Astronomical Observatory =

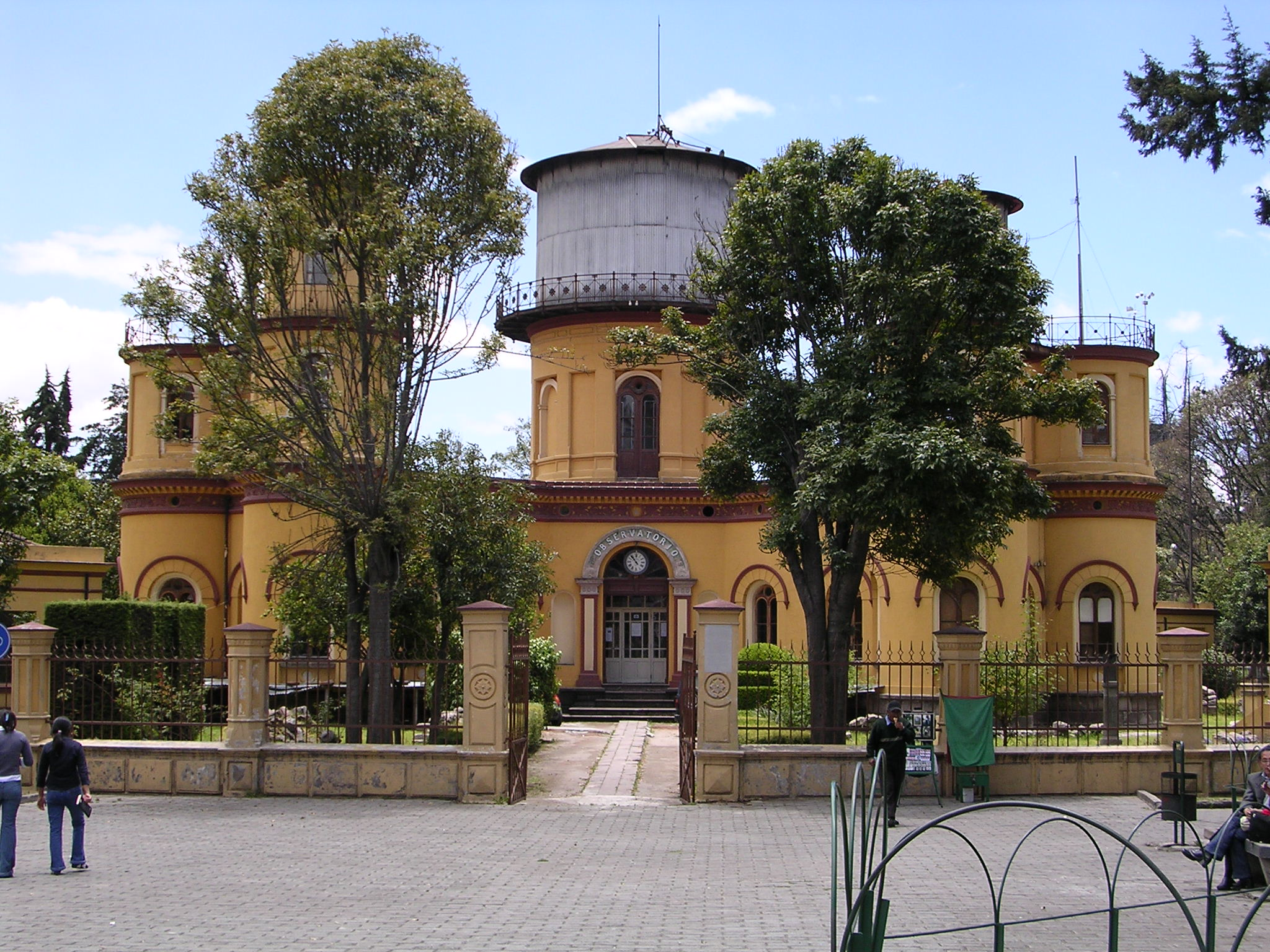
- Quito Astronomical Observatory
- Observatory code: 781
- Location: La Alameda Park, Quito, Quito Canton, Pichincha Province, EC
- Coordinates: 0°12′54″S 78°30′09″W
- Altitude: 2,823 m (9,262 ft)
- Website: oaq.epn.edu.ec
- Location of Quito Astronomical Observatory
- Related media on Commons

The Quito Astronomical Observatory (Spanish: Observatorio Astronómico de Quito – OAQ) is a research institute of EPN, the National Polytechnic School in Quito, Ecuador. Its major research fields are astronomy and atmospheric physics.

The Quito Astronomical Observatory is one of the oldest observatories in South America and was founded in 1873. In 1963, The Government of Ecuador transferred title of the Observatory to the National Polytechnic School. The Quito Astronomical Observatory is the National Observatory of Ecuador and is located 12 minutes south of the Equator in the Historic Center of Quito.

== History ==
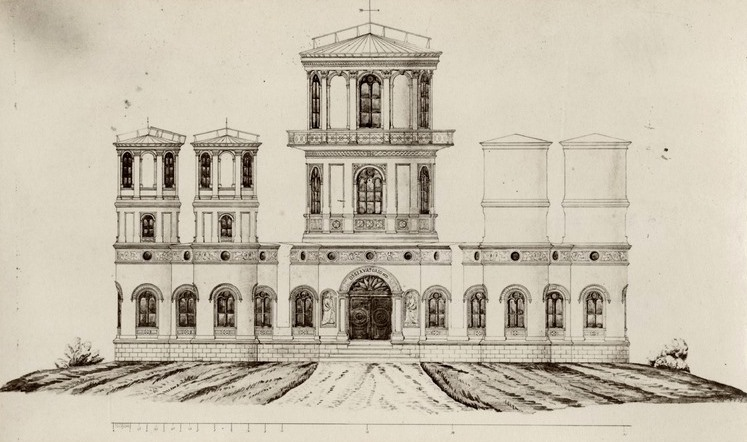
Architectural rendering of the Quito Astronomical Observatory, artist by Ludwig Dressel (1873).

The Quito Astronomical Observatory was founded in 1873. The first director was Juan Bautista Menten, who directed and planned the construction of the center, modeled on the Observatory of Bonn (Germany). The building was finished in 1878. Contained within it is one of the most important collections of nineteenth-century scientific instruments, featuring a refracting telescope and a meridian circle manufactured by Repsold. The 24 cm Merz Equatorial Telescope is the most important instrument of the Observatory. It was manufactured in 1875 in Munich, Germany and is mounted on an equatorial mount.

Ecuador is located in a strategic geographical position where solar-physics studies can be performed year-round, providing data for the scientific community working to understand Sun-Earth interactions.

The Quito Astronomical Observatory was completely renovated and fully restored in 2009.

== Astronomical Museum ==
The Museum of the Quito Astronomical Observatory is located in La Alameda park and gives each visitor a vivid history of the various scientific instruments that were used by early astronomers and scientists. The Astronomical Observatory of Quito is one of the oldest in Latin America, and is a major attraction for scientists, students and tourists in Ecuador.

The Quito Astronomical Observatory has been restored and is open for tourists.

Many of the tools were used by the French Geodesic Mission II who worked in the facilities of the Center between 1902 and 1914.

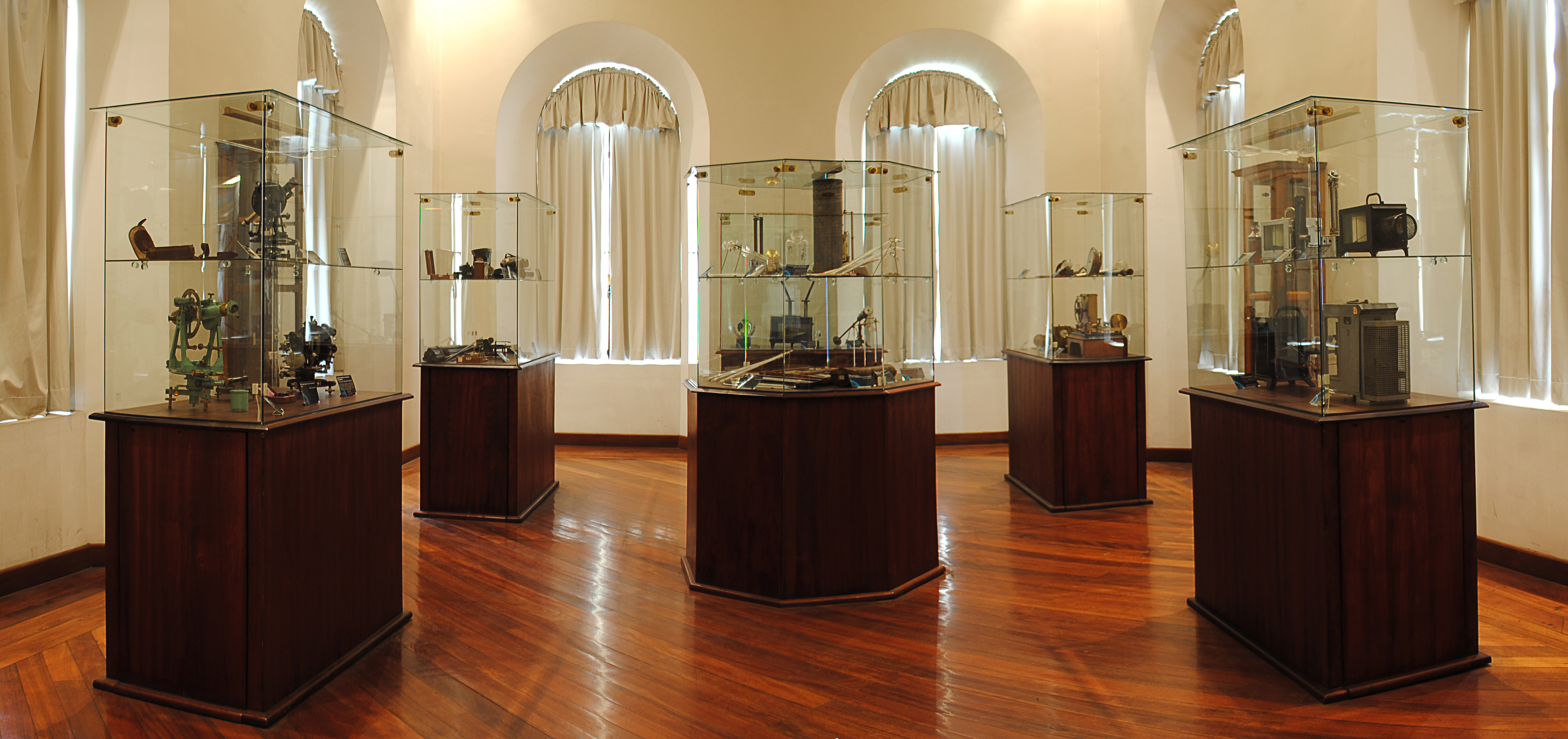
Meteorology Room

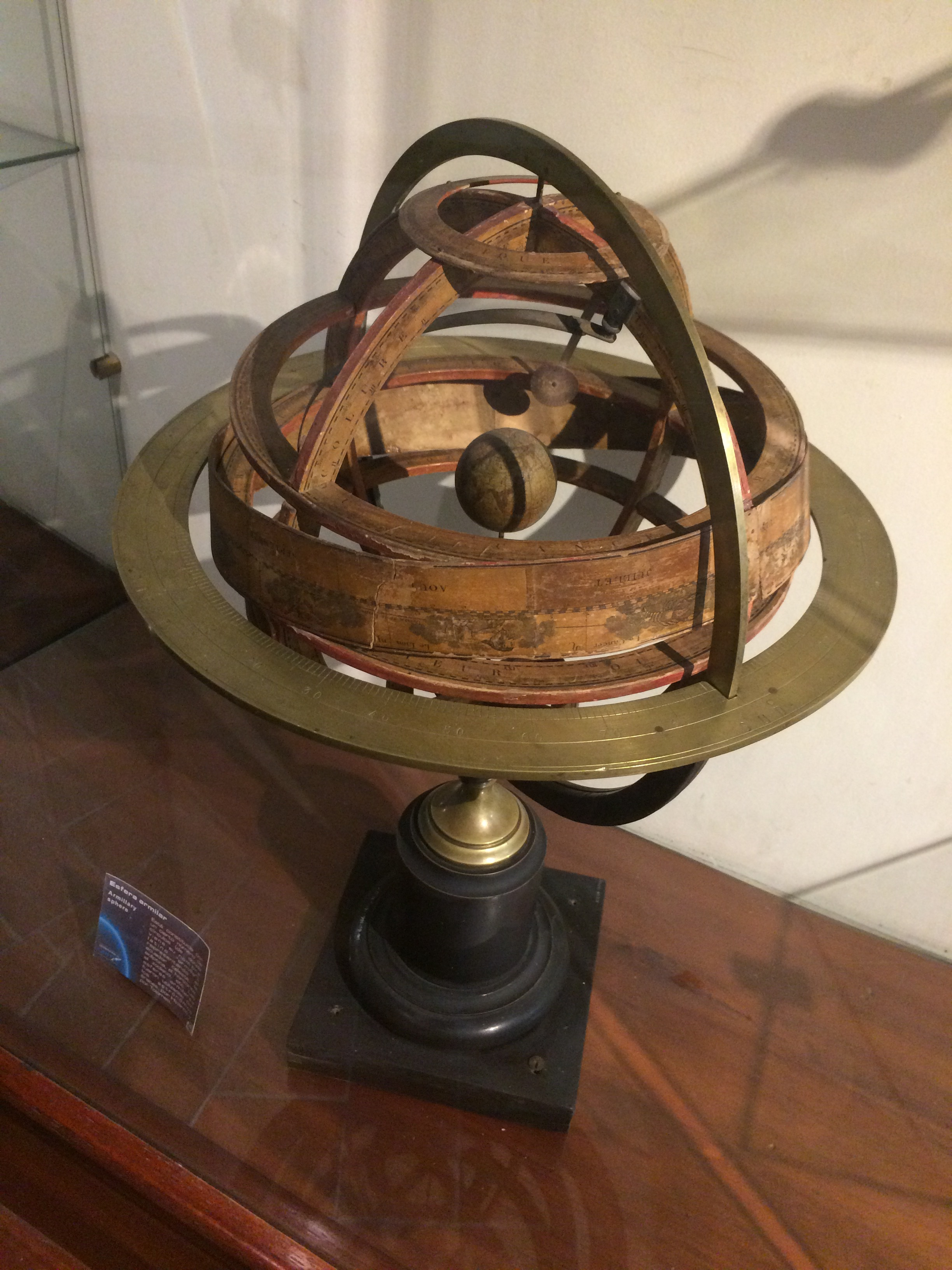
19th century armillary sphere.

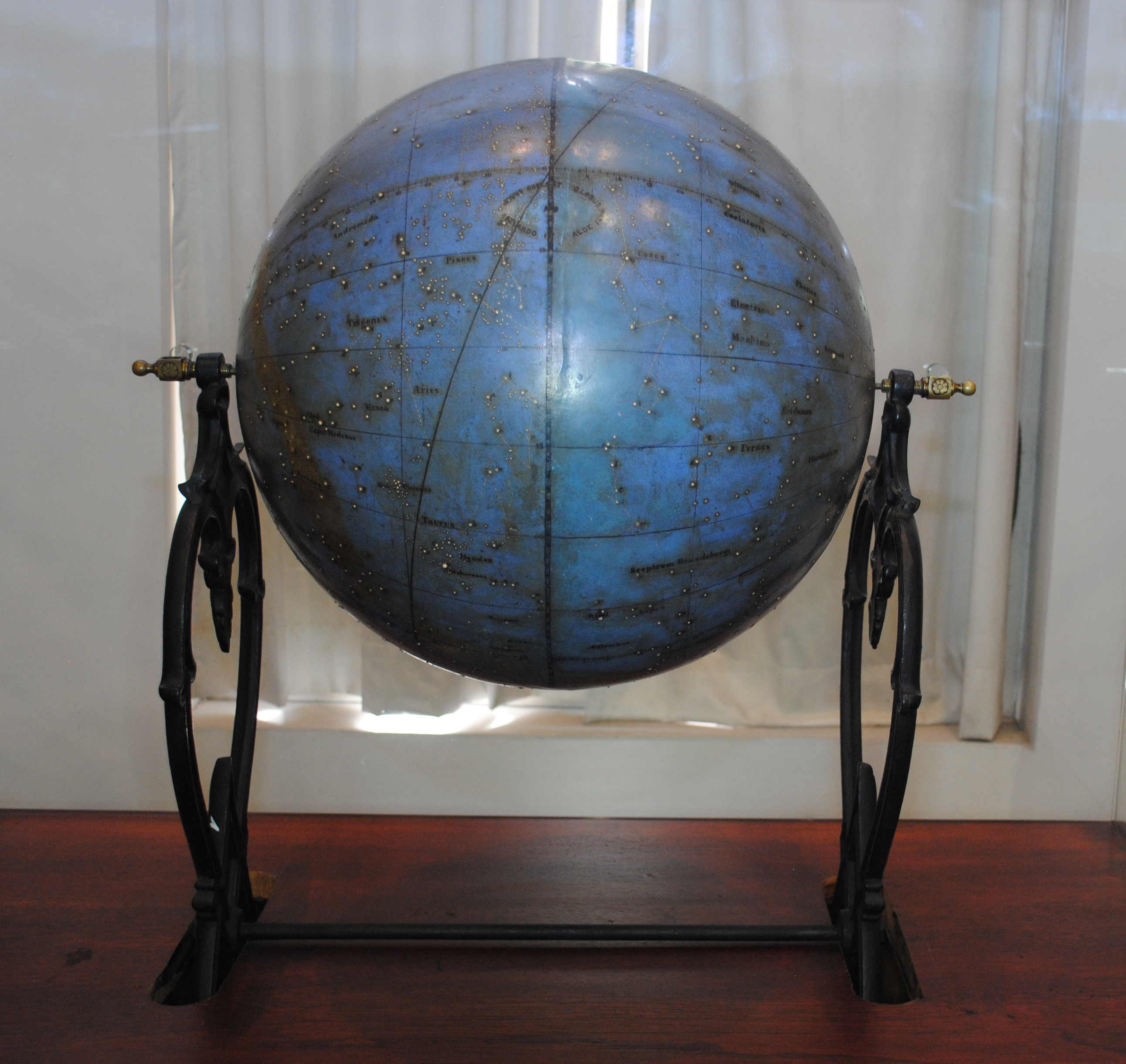
Celestial Globe (1896), by Abelardo Alde.

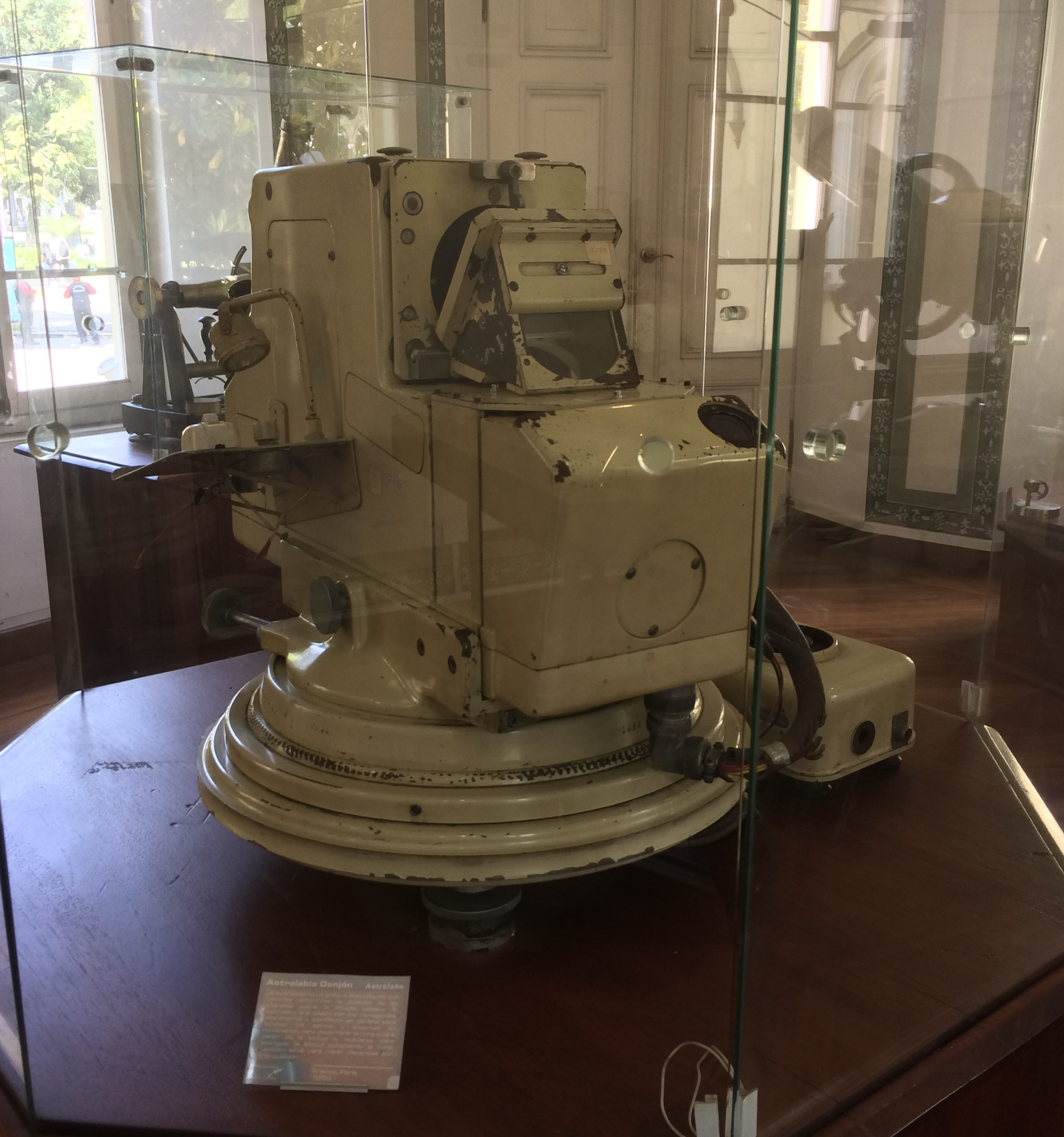
Danjon Prismatic Astrolabe (1954), by Optique et Précision de Levallois.

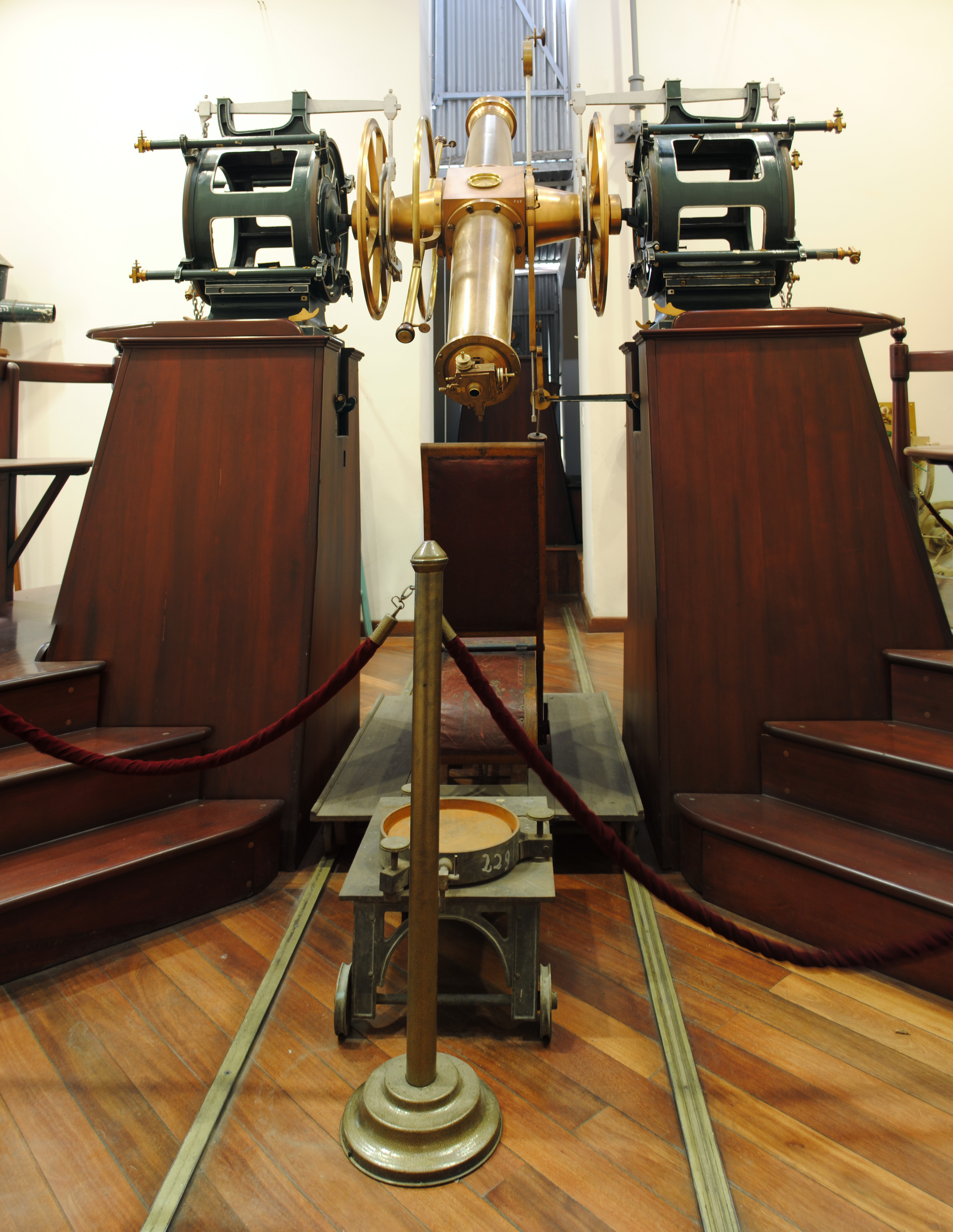
Meridian circle (1889), by Repsold & Söhne.

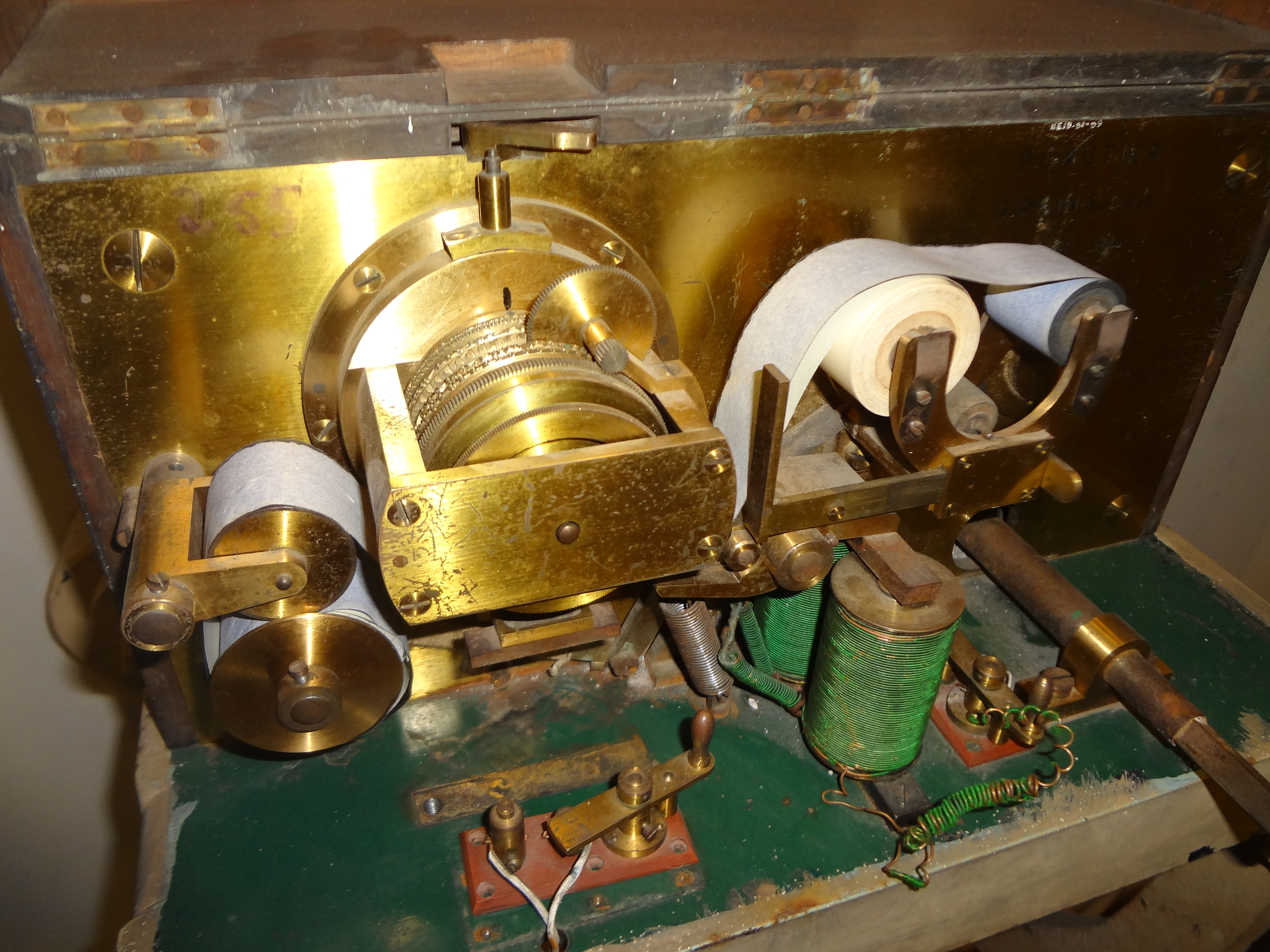
Gauthier Chronograph (1913), by P. Gauthier.

== Activities and services ==
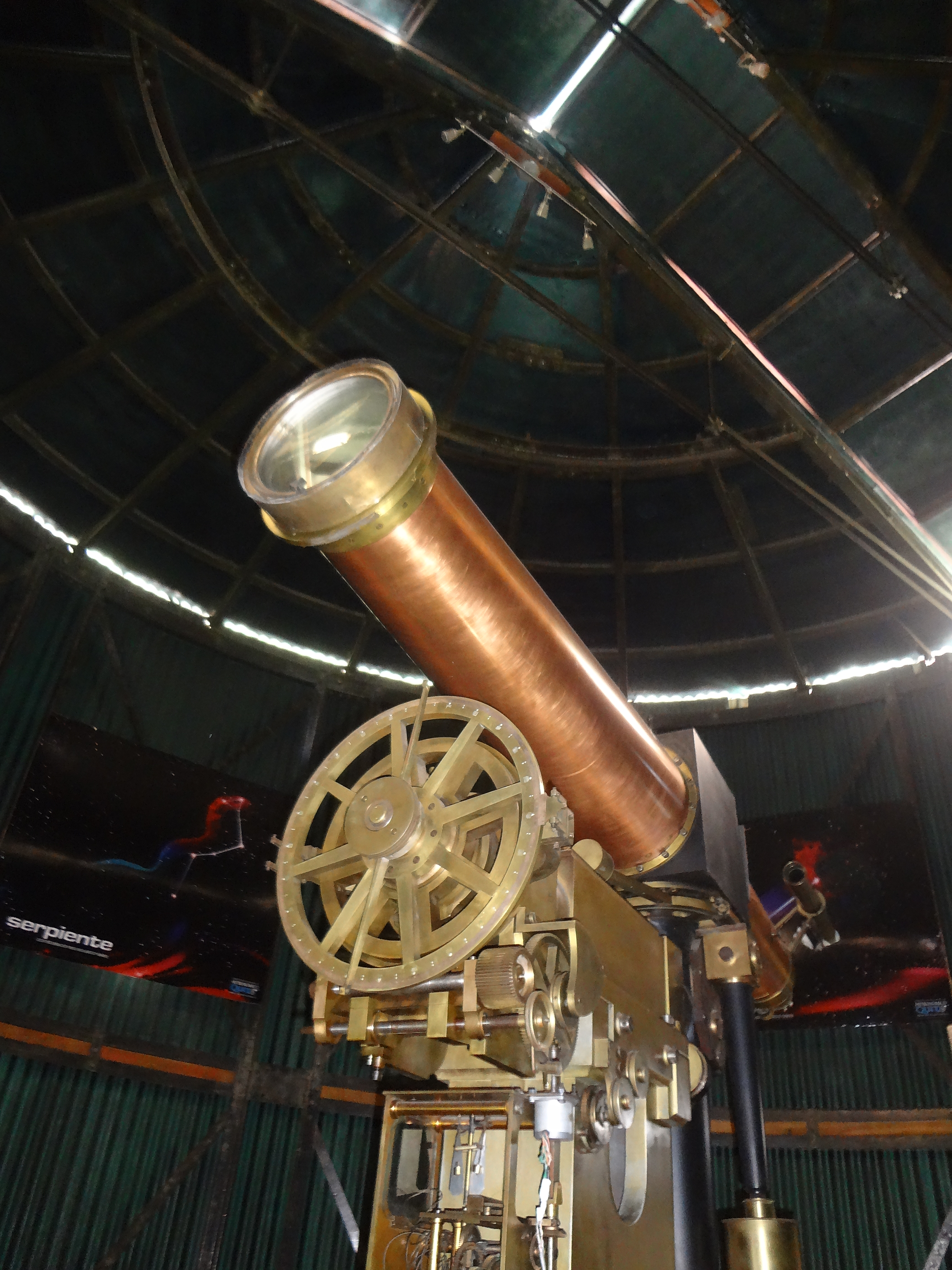
Pictured above is an 1875 Georg Merz and Sons, 24cm (9.4 inch) vintage refracting telescope on an Equatorial mount.

The activities and services currently provided by the OAQ are:

- Night observations by telescopes
- Astronomical information on the equatorial zone
- Tour inside the entire Quito Astronomical Observatory.
- Basic astronomy courses
- Library
- Operation of the museum on the premises
- Annual publications
- Antique seismometers

== See also ==
- History of the telescope
- List of astronomical observatories
