= Numismatic Museum of Ecuador =

Coordinates: 0.2212°S 78.5139°W

- Museo Numismático del Ecuador
- Established: April 2001
- Location: García Moreno and Sucre, Quito, Ecuador
- Type: Numismatic museum
- Collections: Coins, banknotes, medals, stamps, and archaeological objects
- Owner: Central Bank of Ecuador
- Website: https://numismatico.bce.fin.ec

The Numismatic Museum of Ecuador (Spanish: El Museo Numismático del Ecuador), founded by the Central Bank of Ecuador (Spanish: Banco Central del Ecuador), is a numismatic museum in the capital city of Quito.

Inside the museum is a storage area holding commemorative coins, medals, and informative catalogs about the contents of its galleries. It also has an interactive area where specialized numismatic workshops are held.

== History ==
The Numismatic Museum of the Central Bank of Ecuador emerged from an area of numismatic research between 1998 and 1999, although the first acquisitions of heritage coins were made in 1938, when the Central Bank of Ecuador also acquired archaeological pieces and other collectible items.
