= Presley Norton Museum =

Coordinates: 2.1876°S 79.8954°W

- Museo Presley Norton
- Location: Guayaquil, Ecuador
- Director: Amelia Sánchez Mosquera
- Website: www.museopresleynorton.gob.ec

The Presley Norton Museum (Museo Presley Norton) is a museum in Guayaquil, Ecuador which houses a collection of archaeological artifacts, including pottery and figurines made by the original settlers of Ecuador. It occasionally hosts film screenings and live music. The museum has approximately 8,000 artifacts, some dating as far back as 3000 B.C.

The museum is in the Villa Rosa Herlinda mansion, once owned by Ismael Pérez Pazmiño, the founder of El Universo newspaper.

The museum is named in honor of the Ecuadorian archaeologist Presley Norton Yoder (1932-1993).
