= Museo Camilo Egas =

Ecuadorian art museum

Coordinates: 0.2174°S 78.5092°W

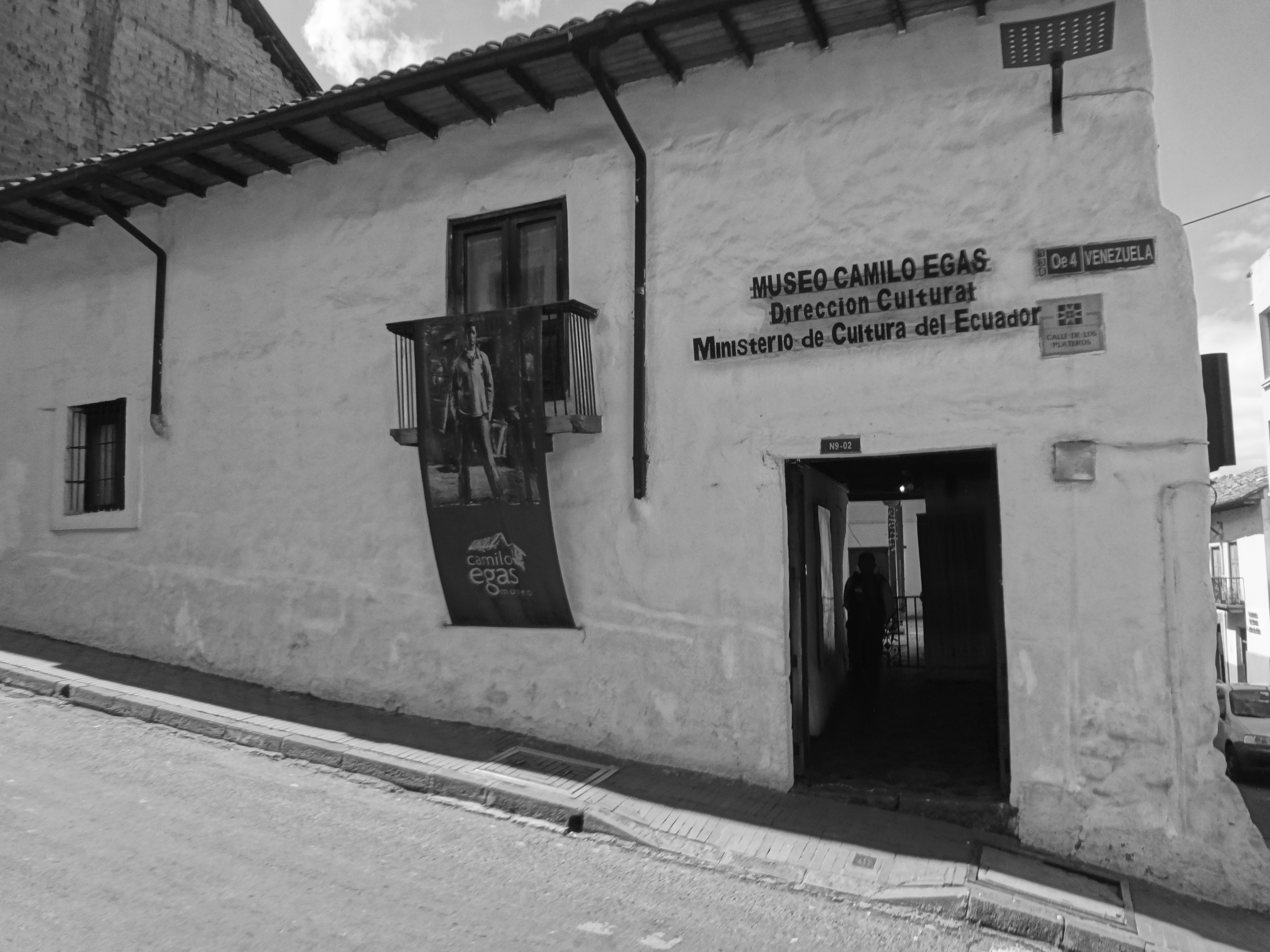
Exterior view

The Museo Camilo Egas is an Ecuadorian art museum about the modernist painter Camilo Egas. It was established in 1980 and is located in Quito, Ecuador.

== See also ==
- List of museums in Ecuador
