= Camilo Egas =

Ecuadorian painter and teacher

- Born: Camilo Alejandro Egas Silva; December 1, 1889; Quito, Ecuador
- Died: 18 September 1962 (aged 72); New York City, U.S.
- Education: Escuela de Bellas Artes, Quito; Real Academia de Bellas Artes de San Fernando; Académie Colarossi
- Known for: Painting, Murals
- Notable work: Ecuadorian Festival (mural), Las Floristas
- Movement: Indigenismo, Social realism, Surrealism, Abstract expressionism
- Awards: Mariano Aguilera Prize (1918, 1923)

Camilo Egas (December 1, 1889 to September 18, 1962) was an Ecuadorian painter and teacher whose career spanned Ecuador, Europe, and the United States.

Egas married the dancer and artist Margarita Gibbons in Paris in 1927. The Museo Camilo Egas in Quito is dedicated to his life and work.

== Early life and education ==
Camilo Alejandro Egas Silva was born in Quito in 1889 and grew up in the San Blas neighborhood of Pichincha Province. His parents were Camilo Egas Caldas, a professor, and María Zoila Silva Larrea. He began his primary education in 1895 at El Cebollar de Los Hermanos Cristianos. He later attended the San Gabriel and Mejía schools before studying art at the Escuela de Bellas Artes in Quito. In 1909, he received two gold medals in national student competitions held during the centennial celebrations of Ecuadorian independence. In 1911, he received a government grant to study abroad at the Royal Academy of Rome. That same year, he returned to the Escuela de Bellas Artes in Quito and won the Cátedra de Pintura competition. Between 1918 and 1923, he won two additional distinctions, including prizes associated with the Mariano Aguilera Salon in Quito. In 1919, Egas studied at the Real Academia de Bellas Artes de San Fernando in Madrid on a second government grant. From 1920 to 1925, he studied at the Académie Colarossi in Paris, where he became the disciple and eventual friend of Pablo Picasso.

== Career in Ecuador and Indigenismo ==
In the early 20th century, the Escuela de Bellas Artes in Quito became an important site for the development of a modern Ecuadorian artistic identity. Although its curriculum initially emphasized European academic traditions, artists and teachers including Paul Bar, Luigi Casadio, and Víctor Puig encouraged greater attention to local subjects and Indigenous models. Between 1911 and 1915, Bar and Casadio started to separate themselves from the school's European Neoclassical ideology.

After a three-year stay in Paris, Egas returned to Quito in 1915, during a period in which Indigenous subject matter was gaining prominence in Ecuadorian art. He combined elements of Ecuadorian costumbrismo with techniques and formal strategies derived from European modernism, producing large-scale paintings centered on Andean Indigenous people and customs. His work became closely associated with Indigenismo, a movement that sought to place Indigenous subjects at the center of national cultural representation. He combined elements of Ecuadorian costumbrismo with techniques and formal strategies derived from European modernism, producing large-scale paintings centered on Andean Indigenous people and customs.

In 1926, Egas returned again to Ecuador and played a prominent role in the local modern art scene. Other Ecuadorian artists associated with Indigenismo included Diógenes Paredes, Bolívar Mena Franco, Pedro León, Eduardo Kingman, and Oswaldo Guayasamín. The Indian theme seen in his work was related to the rise of Socialism and the constitution of Marxist parties in Latin America. He founded Quito's first private art gallery and established Hélice, regarded as Ecuador's first art journal. The magazine published literature, criticism, cartoons, and short fiction, including Pablo Palacio's story Un hombre muerto a puntapiés.

During this period, Egas also taught at the Normal de Quito, gave courses at the Escuela de Bellas Artes, and served as art director of the National Theatre. His treatment of Indigenous themes evolved over time. His earlier works often presented Indigenous figures in formalized and idealized compositions, while later works increasingly emphasized social inequality and labor conditions.

== Move to New York ==
In 1927, Egas settled in Greenwich Village, New York, after his artistic ventures in Quito failed to attract sustained local support. He founded Quito's first private art gallery and established Hélice, regarded as Ecuador's first art journal. In 1927, Egas settled in Greenwich Village, New York, after his artistic ventures in Quito failed to attract sustained local support. His move also followed his marriage to Margarita Gibbons. In the United States, Egas encountered an artistic climate increasingly shaped by social themes.

In 1932, he joined the New School for Social Research in New York City. That year, he was commissioned by Alvin Johnson to paint Ecuadorian Festival, a mural for the school's dance division. Although Egas conceived the work as an expression of Ecuadorian cultural identity, it was widely interpreted in the context of American social realism. As a result, Egas came to be identified in the United States with socially engaged painting and began depicting workers and unhoused people in addition to Indigenous subjects.

== 1939 New York World's Fair mural ==
In 1939, Egas was commissioned to create a mural for the Ecuadorian Pavilion at the New York World's Fair. The commission was associated with efforts by Ecuadorian cultural institutions, including the Museo Jijón y Caamaño de Arqueología y Arte Colonial, to present a national image abroad. The project became contentious because of conflicting artistic, political, and commercial priorities among Ecuadorian officials and fair organizers. Ecuadorian critics objected to what they saw as an image of the nation overly defined by poverty and indigeneity, while some U.S. viewers found the symbolism difficult to interpret. According to Egas, the mural was intended to represent Ecuador's past, present, and future, while emphasizing Indigenous heritage, artisanal production, agricultural abundance, and modernization. The controversy surrounding the mural contributed to Egas's eventual break with Indigenismo. He subsequently stopped publicly exhibiting his earlier Indigenist works. The mural was later destroyed during the period of political and military tensions between Ecuador and Peru that culminated in war in 1941.

== Later life ==
From 1927 until his death, Egas was based primarily in New York City, although he also spent time in Spain and Italy and made return visits to Ecuador. In the 1940s and 1950s, his work moved away from Indigenismo and social realism toward Surrealism, neo-Cubism, and eventually Abstract expressionism. According to Diana Iturralde Mantilla, the postwar artistic environment in New York encouraged Egas to experiment more extensively with surrealist forms and introspective subject matter. This shift drew criticism from some observers, including Alvin Saunders Johnson, who regarded it as a departure from the cultural identity associated with his earlier work. Egas defended these changes as part of artistic self-expression.

In New York, he befriended José Clemente Orozco. His work of the 1930s included the murals Harvesting Food in Ecuador: No Profit Motif in Any Face or Figure and Harvesting Food in North America. In 1935, he became the first director of art at the New School. Between 1945 and 1956, he helped expand the school's workshops in response to the arrival of émigré artists during and after the Second World War. Egas continued teaching and directing the art program at the New School until his death. In 1962, the school awarded him an honorary doctorate in fine arts. He also received recognition from the American Academy of Arts and Letters after his death.

During the 1950s, Egas exhibited in Caracas, Quito, and New York.

Egas died of cancer on September 18, 1962, in the Bronx, New York.

== Legacy ==
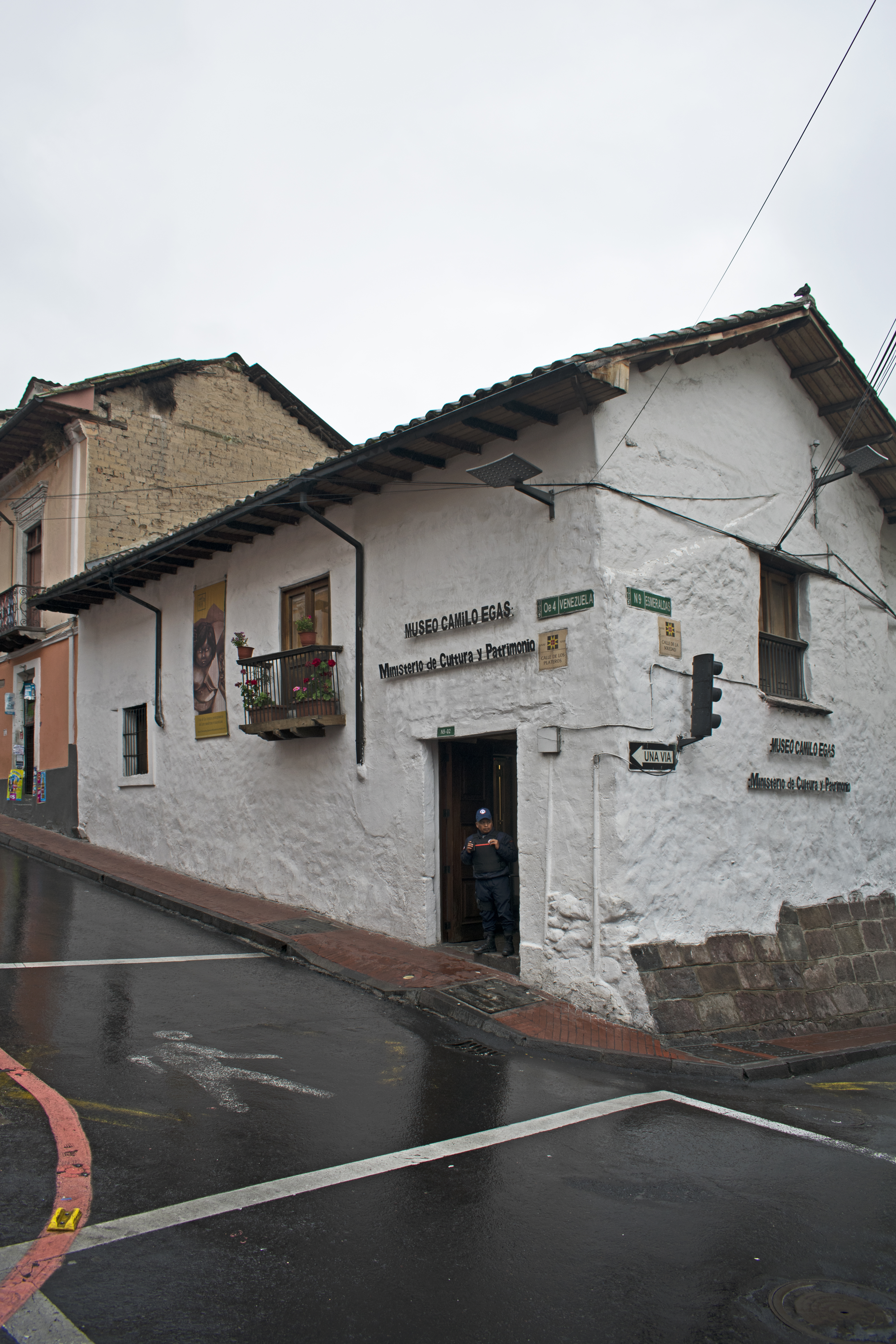
Camilo Egas museum in Quito

The Museo Camilo Egas in Quito opened in 1981 with a permanent exhibition of his work. After closing for a period of 15 years, it reopened in 2003 under the auspices of the Banco Central del Ecuador. The collection is now held by Ecuador's Ministry of Culture. The museum is located in the historic center of Quito, at the corner of Venezuela and Esmeraldas streets.

== See also ==
- List of Ecuadorian artists
