= Presley Norton Yoder =

- Born: February 26, 1932; Guayaquil, Ecuador
- Died: May 8, 1993 (aged 61)
- Occupations: Archeologist, Entrepreneur
- Spouse(s): Leonor Pérez Gómez, Georgina Marten Sturt, María Isabel Fernández Salvador Eastman
- Parent(s): Presley Norton, Blanche La Rose Yoder

Presley Norton Yoder (Guayaquil, February 26, 1932 – May 8, 1993) was an Ecuadorian archeologist and entrepreneur.

He made excavations in the 1970s and early 1980s, in the province of Guayas, where he uncovered a number of vases and figurines of the Machalilla culture, and also uncovered some from the Valdivia culture dating 3000 years BC.

== Biography ==
Presley Norton Yoder was born in Guayaquil, Ecuador, on February 26, 1932. His father was Presley Norton (1907–1944) of New York, and his mother was Blanche La Rose Yoder of Guayaquil.

Presley Norton's grandfather was Evermont Hope Norton (1873–1960) a businessman from Richmond, Virginia, who was a former president and chairman of the Ecuadorian Corporation, Ltd. and the International Products Corporation. Evermont went to South America in 1911 as president of the Guayaquil and Quito Railway Company, after an early career as a stockbroker in New York. He developed the Ecuadorian Railroad, which rises from the Pacific Coast city of Guayaquil, over the Andes Mountains to Quito. Evermont graduated in 1895 from the University of Virginia. He started in Wall Street the following year, and until 1899 was senior partner in Norton & Tunstall. He served in Naval Intelligence in World War I. He was married several times, one time to Lily Bouvier Morison of Saint Louis, MO who was a great aunt of Jackeline Bouvier Kennedy.

Presley Norton's father died when he was about 12 years old. He inherited shares worth $600,000, which by the time he was of age in 1950 had become $5,000,000.

Norton had dual citizenship in Ecuador and the United States, because he was born in Ecuador and his father was born in New York. In 1950 he joined the American army, which stationed him in Hawaii (1950–1952).

Between 1950 and 1953 he studied literature and history at Brown University in Providence, Rhode Island. He then went to Paris and enrolled at the Sorbonne, where he took courses in the history of French civilization and contemporary philosophy until 1955.

In 1960 Norton married Leonor Pérez Gómez, with whom he had 4 children. After divorcing Leonor he married an English woman, Georgina Marten Sturt, in 1973. He divorced Georgina in 1978 and married María Isabel Fernández Salvador Eastman in 1982, with whom he had 2 children.

In 1962 he started the first television channel in Guayaquil, Ecuador, "Televisión Ecuatoriana Canal 4" (Ecuadorian TV Channel 4) with the help of ABC (American Broadcasting Inc) of New York who put up 1/3 of the money while he put up a 2/3 investment. Later he started Channel 6 in Quito.

He died on May 8, 1993, of a heart attack.

== Published works ==
- "Shamans stools and the time depth of tropical forest culture" (1974) with O. Zerries y Donaid Lathrap
- "The Loma Alta Connection" (1977) a report for the Society for American Archaeology, which took place in New Orleans.
- "La cueva de Los Tallos y la ciencia ficción" (1978) for the magazine Artes, Nos. 2-4 of Quito
- "From the Yungas of Chinchaysuyo to Cusco, the role of La Plata island in the spondylus trade" (1979) co-written with Jorge Marcos Pino, a report for the 43rd Congress of Americanists meeting, which took place in Vancouver, Canada.
- "Excavaciones en la isla de La Plata" (1981) for the book Ecuador a la sombra de los volcanes (Ecuador in the shadows of the volcanoes)
- "Balao, un modelo de asentamiento prehistórico y protohistórico en Esmeraldas, Ecuador" (1981)
- "El rol de la Isla de la Plata en el comercio de spondylus" report for the Organization of American States. (1981)
- "I fenicci del Ecuador" (1982) a chapter for the book Tessori de la térra de Atahualpa, Venecia.
- "La conexión Loma Alta" (1983) in the book Tesoros del Ecuador antiguo, for the Institute for Iberoamerican Cooperation (Instituto de Cooperación Iberoamericana)
- "Salango, informe de progreso" (1983) published in the Miscelánea antropológica ecuatoriana No. 3 del Banco Central.
- "The chiefdome of Salangame and the league of merchants, the spondylus-balsa wood cartel" (1984) in New Modeis for the Political economy of pre-columbian política, Netherly y D. Freidel, de London.
- The introduction of the book Las Huellas del Jaguar: la arqueología del Ecuador (1984) by K. D. Gartiemann, Quito
- "Cambio y continuidad en Salango" (1984)
- "Salango en la prehistoria" (1984) published in Cromos.
- "The collaborative approach to rescue and conservation: the caso of Salango" (1985) for the Second Conference of Archeological Rescue, which took place in Dallas, Texas
- "Animales prehistóricos domesticados en Salango" (1985) published in the Miscelánea antropológica ecuatoriana No. 4 del Banco Central.
- "Arqueología submarina en las islas encantadas" (1985)
- "Balance de rescate arqueológico en el Ecuador", (1988) London
- "Si el spondylus nadara" (1988) for the Center of Investigation and Culture of the Central Bank in Cuenca.
- "5000 años de ocupación : Parque Nacional Machalilla" (1992) co-written with Marco Vinicio García
