= Gustavo Orcés V. Natural History Museum =

Museum in Quito, Ecuador

Coordinates: 0.2104°S 78.4928°W

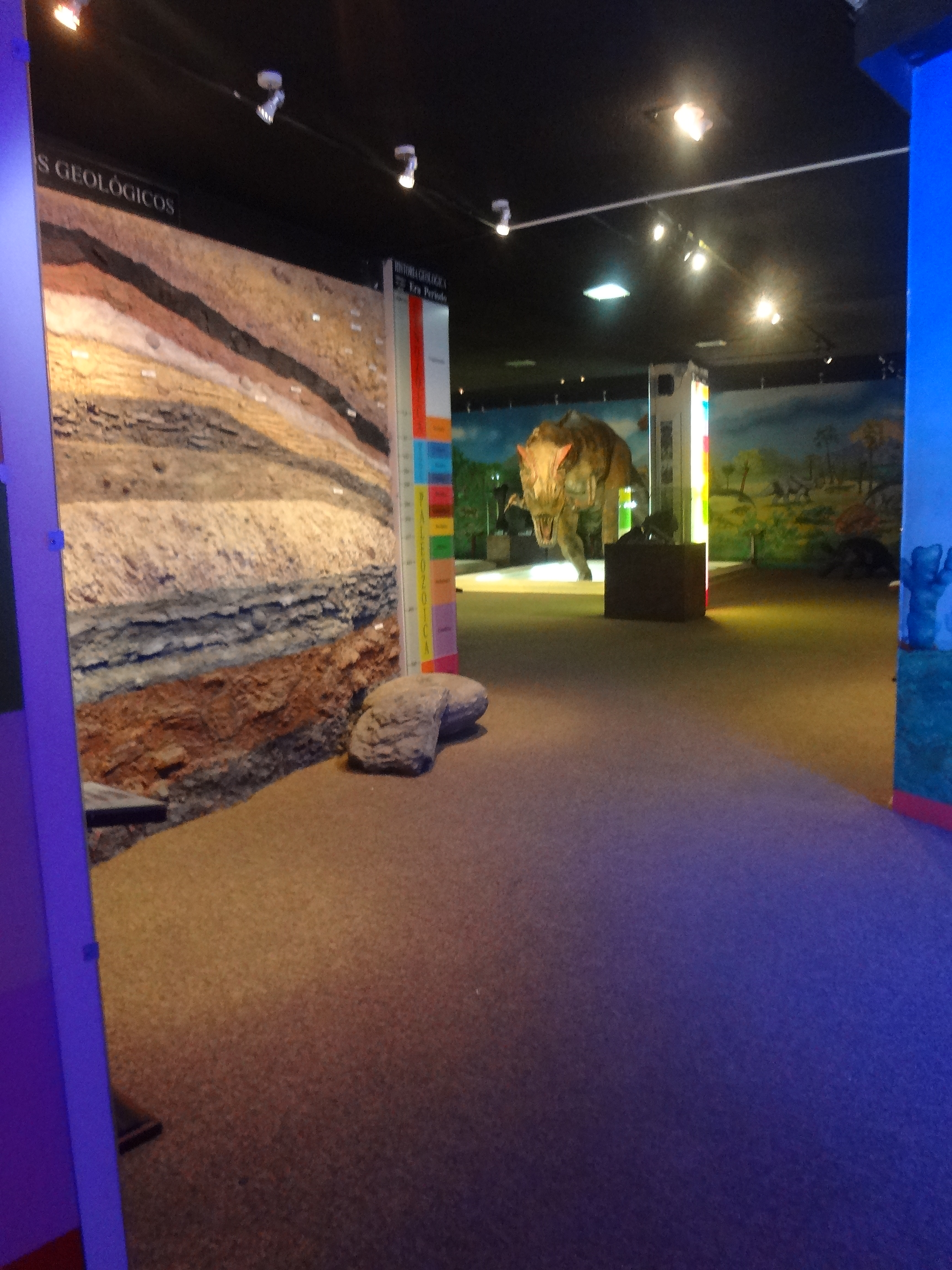
Interior view

Gustavo Orcés V. Natural History Museum (Spanish: Museo de Historia Natural Gustavo Orcés V.) is a natural history museum in Quito, Ecuador. It was established in 2005.

== Background ==
From the eighteenth century European naturalists came to Ecuador for scientific expeditions, during which they collected specimens of flora, fauna, rocks and fossils. In the early twentieth century, Franz Spillmann brought together a collection of fossils, which formed the "Cabinet of Natural Sciences" of the Central University. Later, in 1946, Robert Hoffstetter and Gustavo Orcés founded the Department of Biology at the National Polytechnic School, and made numerous paleontological expeditions, particularly in the Santa Elena peninsula. Hoffstetter’s extensive work and organization formed the basis of the modern museum.
