= Carmen Febres-Cordero de Ballén =

Ecuadorian writer and poet (1829–1893)

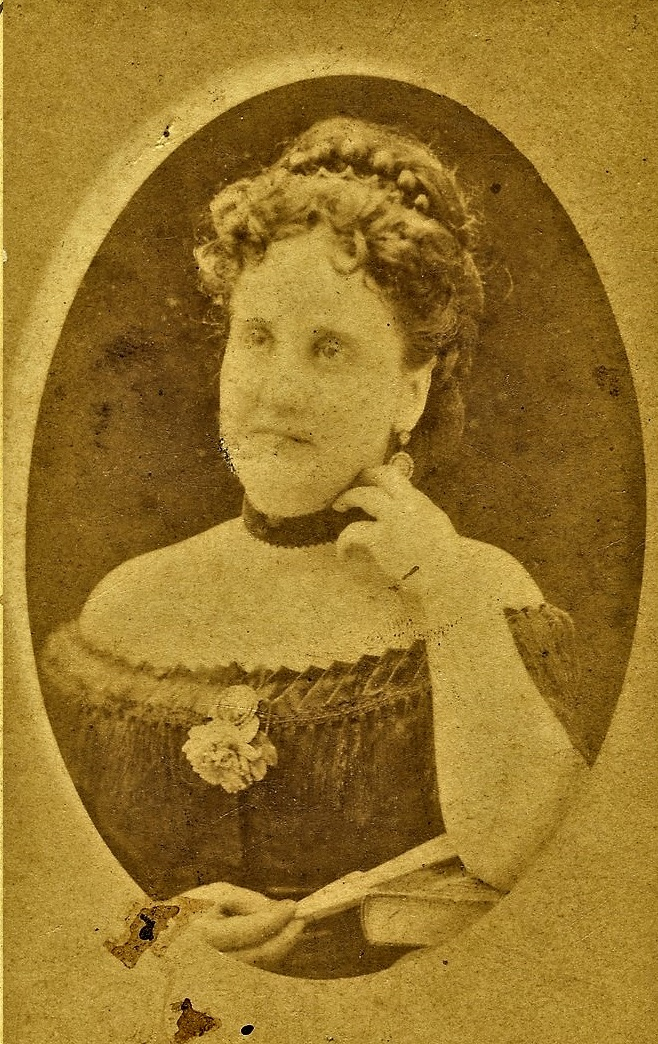
Carmen Febres-Cordero de Ballen

Carmen Febres-Cordero de Ballén (1829–1893) was an Ecuadorian writer and poet.

== Biography ==
Carmen Febres-Cordero was born in Guayaquil in 1829. (Note: Other sources indicate that she was born in 1832, or possibly July 16, 1830.) She was the daughter of lieutenant colonel Joaquín Francisco Febres Cordero and of Maria de Jesus Montoya. She had four brothers.

In 1853, she married Aurelio Ballén de Guzmán. They had three children.

There are few known poems by this author, but they are all said to be of merit. According to Manuel Gallegos, they were written in her adolescence. She improvised the verses with a well-measured metric, her talent being well-cultivated. Examples of her works include, "A mi esposo ausente" (To my absent husband), that Jose Bernardine Suárez considers most notable, "A una flor" (To a flower) and "A mi madre" (To my mother), also quite outstanding, "Himno" (Hymn) and a poem dedicated to her friend Ángela Caamaño, which appeared in several poetic anthologies of the time, such as La guirnalda literaria (The literary garland) (1870) or Parnaso ecuatoriano (1879). In her poems, Febres-Cordero expresses tenderness and passion, but she also succumbs to the weight of disappointments. She collaborated with various newspapers such as La Esperanza, along with other authors such as Dolores Sucre and Rita Lecumberri, in the liberal El espejo, created in 1871, and in the magazine El Álbum in 1880.

Febres-Cordero settled in Chile at least since 1879, and died in Valparaíso in 1893.

A street in the city of Quito is named in her honor.
