= Santa Ana Hill =

Hill in Guayaquil, Ecuador

Coordinates: 2.1809°S 79.8779°W

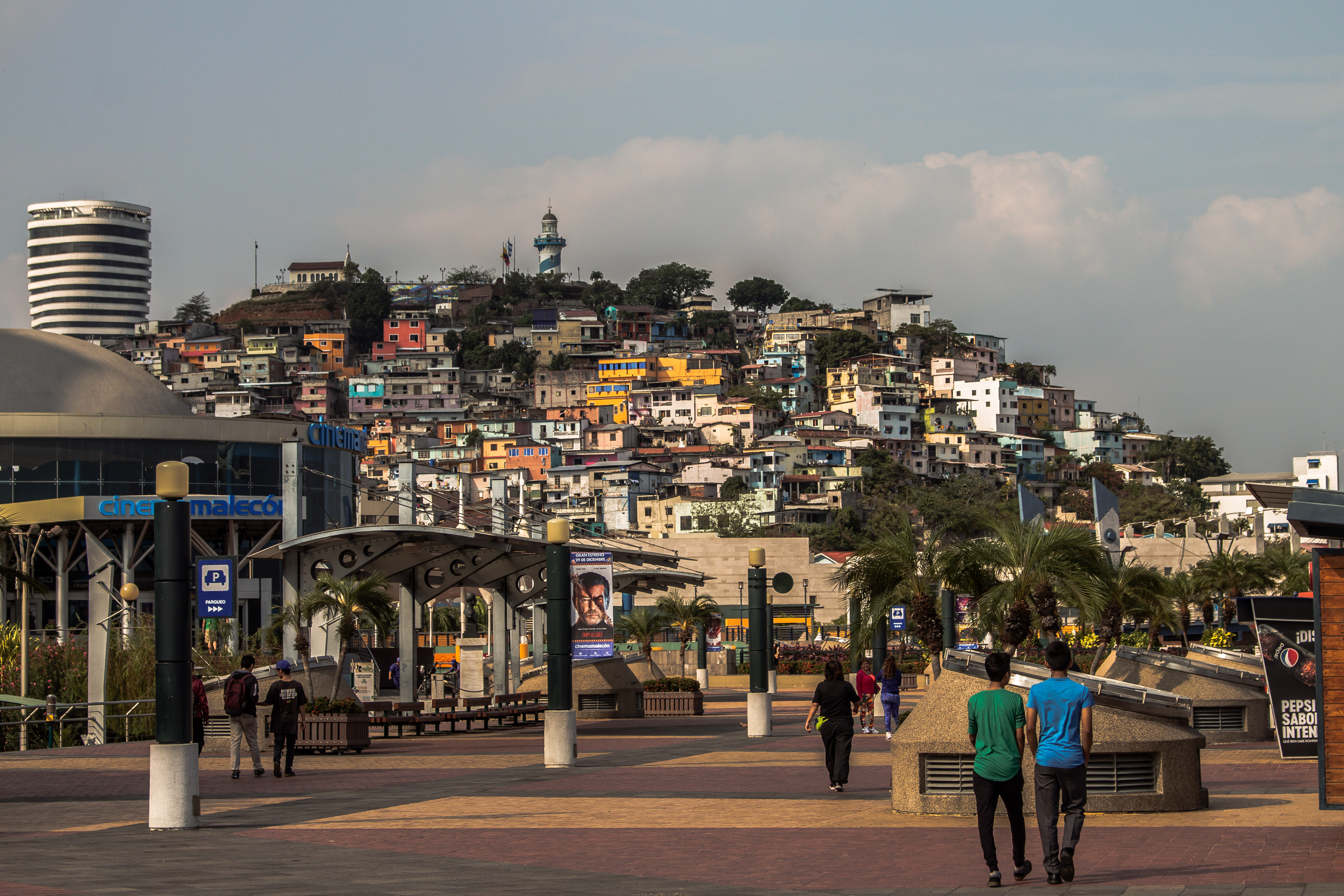
View of Santa Ana Hill from the Malecón 2000

Santa Ana Hill is a tourist attraction in Guayaquil, Ecuador.

== History ==
The horizon line when viewed from the Guayas River is punctuated by two hills on its right margin. The Santa Ana and El Carmen Hills are icons of visual reference to locate any of the principal sectors of the city. It was on the Santa Ana Hill and its surroundings that the first definite settlement of its citizens began in 1547. Settling on the “Little Green Hill”, as it was originally called, afforded complete visibility and ample possibilities for defense. Additionally, the firm ground, compared to the plains below, allowed for more solid and reliable structures. The first main church and town hall were built, and the traffic of its populace slowly trickled downward to the surrounding areas. The San Carlos and La Planchada fortifications were faced toward the river to defend against one of the most fearsome enemies of the city, pirates. Pirate battles gradually gave way to commercial endeavors.

== Present ==
Cannons and forts remain around the Santa Ana Hill. The ascent to the renovated tourist center begins at the Diego Noboa central staircase that traverses the brilliantly colored facades of the houses. After 456 steps that lead by cafes, restaurants, art galleries and tiny plazas, the overview of the city appears.

== Attractions ==
There are some attractions of general interest

- Plaza mirador el fortin
- Capilla de Santa Ana
- Lighthouse
- Plaza de honores
- Museo Abierto

== Restaurants and bars ==
The Santa Ana Hill is surrounded by restaurants and bars.

- La Palette (bar)
- Escalon 69 (bar)
- Budahai (bar)
- La casa del Marinero (restaurant)
