= Health in Ecuador =

Ecuador has a comprehensive publicly funded health system and national health insurance. Free medical care (with an extensive system of hospitals and regional health clinics) is available to all residents regardless of income, and without buying any type of medical insurance. An extensive and proactive program for public health includes actions such as teams of nurses going door-to-door offering influenza vaccines to residents. Isolated rural areas are also served by this system, as physicians, dentists, and nurses are obliged to perform one year of "rural service" in these communities. This service is mandatory for professional licensing in Ecuador.

The Human Rights Measurement Initiative found that Ecuador, based on its level of income, fulfilled 92.6% of requirements for the right to health, 97.1% for the right to health concerning children, and 90.9% for the right to health concerning adults. Ecuador falls into the "fair" category when evaluating the right to reproductive health because the nation fulfilled only 89.8% of expectations, based on its level of income.

== Health conditions by climatic regions ==
Health conditions in Ecuador vary within its three distinct climatic regions: tropical, Sierra highland, and Amazon rainforest.

Most Ecuadorians live within the Sierra, such as the cities of Quito and Cuenca, where health conditions most commonly associated with the tropics do not exist. For example, the types of mosquitoes which carry malaria and dengue fever cannot live at an altitude above 2,300 meters (according to the U.S. Centers for Disease Control), which is the minimum altitude throughout most of the Sierra.

Despite a lack of general agreement in the medical community about the prevalence of altitude-related conditions, some visitors to the highlands may experience symptoms. The lower atmospheric pressure of the Sierra can cause difficulty in breathing, nausea, and dizziness, but these conditions are typically not of long duration and require a period of reduced activity and conservative eating and drinking for acclimatization. Conversely, Ecuadorians who live most of their lives in the Sierra commonly require a brief period of readjustment after moving to sea level.

In the low-lying coastal regions and the Amazonian region, the predictable diseases of those climates exist. However, malaria and dengue fever are no longer epidemics in Ecuador. The potential for these diseases does exist, but mostly in isolated, economically depressed areas of the Amazon and seacoast. Life expectancy in Ecuador is approximately the same as in the United States.

For residents who are members of the Ecuadorian Institute of Social Security, an additional modern system of hospitals and clinics is provided through employee and employer payroll deductions or voluntary payments, as is the case with many expatriates residing in Ecuador. The monthly contribution for voluntary members for a family of two in this system is just over $80. Employees contribute .0935 of their salaries for this coverage, but this also includes membership in the national pension system. Private health care is also available in the form of mostly smaller, doctor-owned health clinics. Private health insurance can be purchased but is largely used by middle- and upper-income groups.

Ecuador has benefited from the Cuban system of medical education, sending over 100 students per year (for over ten years) to the Escuela de Medicina Latinoamericana at no cost to the government of Ecuador or the students. The program requires that 50% of these students be women. Before returning to practice in Ecuador, it is common for these doctors to complete specialized residencies in the major cities of Argentina and Chile, among other countries. Additionally, Cuban nationals are numerous among the professors in the faculties of medicine in the major cities of Ecuador, including Quito, Guayaquil, Cuenca, and Ambato.

== Health services ==
The current structure of the Ecuadorian public health care system dates back to 1967. The Ministry of Public Health (Ministerio de Salud Publica del Ecuador, or MSP) is responsible for the regulation and creation of public health policies and health care plans, and is appointed directly by the President of the Republic. The philosophy of the Ministry of Public Health is to give social support and services to the most vulnerable populations and its main plan of action lies around community health and preventive medicine.

The Ecuadorian public health care system permits patients to be treated daily as outpatients in public general hospitals, with no previous appointment, by general practitioners and specialists. This is organized around the four basic specialties of pediatric medicine, gynecology, clinical medicine, and surgery. Specialty hospitals are also part of the public health care system to target chronic diseases or a particular group of the population. For instance, there are oncology hospitals (SOLCA) to treat cancer patients, children's hospitals, psychiatric hospitals, gynecologic and maternity hospitals, geriatric hospitals, ophthalmology hospitals, and gastroenterology hospitals, among others.

Although fully equipped general hospitals are found in the major cities or capitals of the provinces, there are basic hospitals in the smaller towns and canton cities for family care consultation and treatment in pediatrics, gynecology, clinical medicine, and surgery.

Community health care centers (centros de salud), or day hospitals, are found inside metropolitan areas of cities and in rural areas. These day hospitals give care to patients whose hospitalization is less than 24 hours.

Most of the rural communities in Ecuador have a sizable population of indigenous people; the doctors assigned to those communities, also called "rural doctors", are in charge of small clinics to meet the needs of these patients in the same fashion as the day hospitals in the major cities. The care given in rural hospitals is required to respect the culture of the community.

The MSP provides health services to 30 percent of the Ecuadorian population. The Institute of Social Security covers 18 percent of the population. Two percent is covered by the Armed Forces. Non-governmental organizations (NGOs) cover about five percent. Private services cover 20 percent.

In 2011, there were 1.7 medical practitioners per 1,000 in population.

== History ==
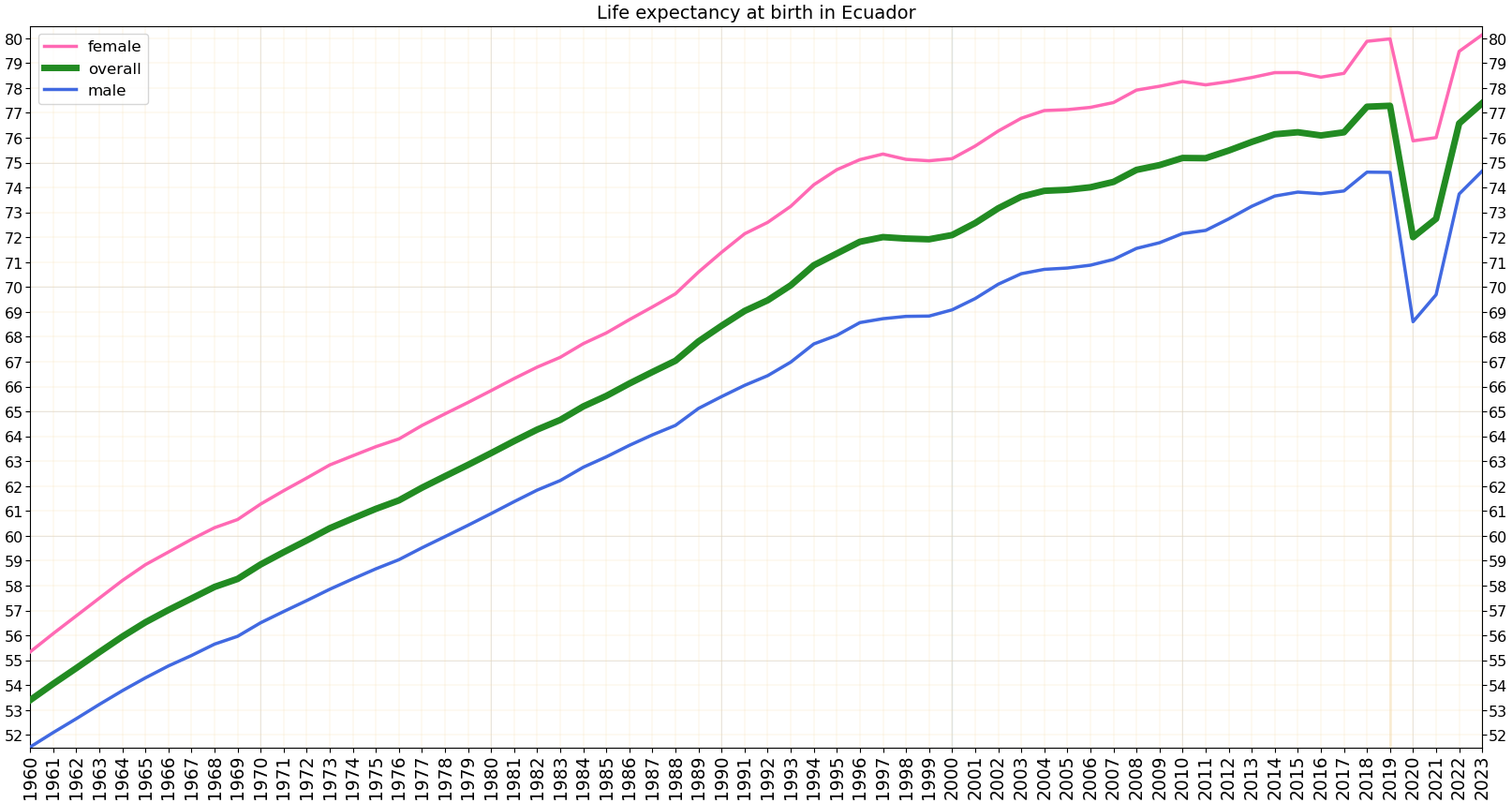
Development of life expectancy in Ecuador since 1960

- 1830s – Surveys in urban areas show a range of 5 to 108 infant deaths per 1000 live births, whereas those in rural areas vary from 90 to 200.
- 1867 – Alejo Lascano Bahamonde founds the Faculty of Medicine in Guayaquil, the first faculty of medicine in the city.
- 1950s – Intestinal ailments and respiratory diseases (including bronchitis, emphysema, asthma, and pneumonia) cause roughly 3/4 of all infant deaths.
- 1959 – The Ecuadorian government conducts a national survey to determine conclusions about the malnutrition rates in Ecuador.
- 1960s – More limited studies about malnutrition rates are conducted.
- late 1960s – 40% of preschool children show some degree of malnutrition. 30% of children under 12 years of age are malnourished and 15% are anemic.
- late 1980s – Childhood mortality decreases to 0.9%.
- 1991 – Health officials in Ecuador, Bolivia, and Chile banned the entry of uncooked food from Peru, particularly fish, which reduced the spread of many diseases in Ecuador.
- 2010 – Dengue hemorrhagic fever epidemic in Ecuador.

== Statistics ==
According to the World Health Organization (WHO), in Ecuador in 2019 the average life expectancy at birth if 76 years for males and 80 years for females. Childhood mortality (probability of dying by age 5) was 13.43 per 1,000 live births. Mortality for adults between 15 and 60 years (per 1,000 population) was 206 for males and 123 for females.

== Diseases ==
Many diseases are prevalent in Ecuador, mainly due to environmental conditions, geographical location, and lack of health care. Specific health problems that are common in Ecuador include infant mortality, acute respiratory infection, diarrhea, dengue fever, malaria, tuberculosis, HIV/AIDS, health problems due to smoking, and malnutrition. According to WHO data on confirmed cases of malaria, Ecuador had 8,464 cases per 100,000 population in 2007 and 544 cases in 2012. Changes in living conditions and health care appear to have had a significant effect on this condition.

In Ecuador, there are approximately 14,000 cases of tuberculosis per year. The HIV prevalence rate is 3 cases for every 1,000 people. Stunting from chronic malnutrition affects 26% of children under 5. There are approximately 686 malaria cases per 100,000 people.

== Nutrition overview ==
Currently worldwide there has been a rapid increase in the prevalence of non-communicable diseases, which in part is explained by an important health issue which it is malnutrition.

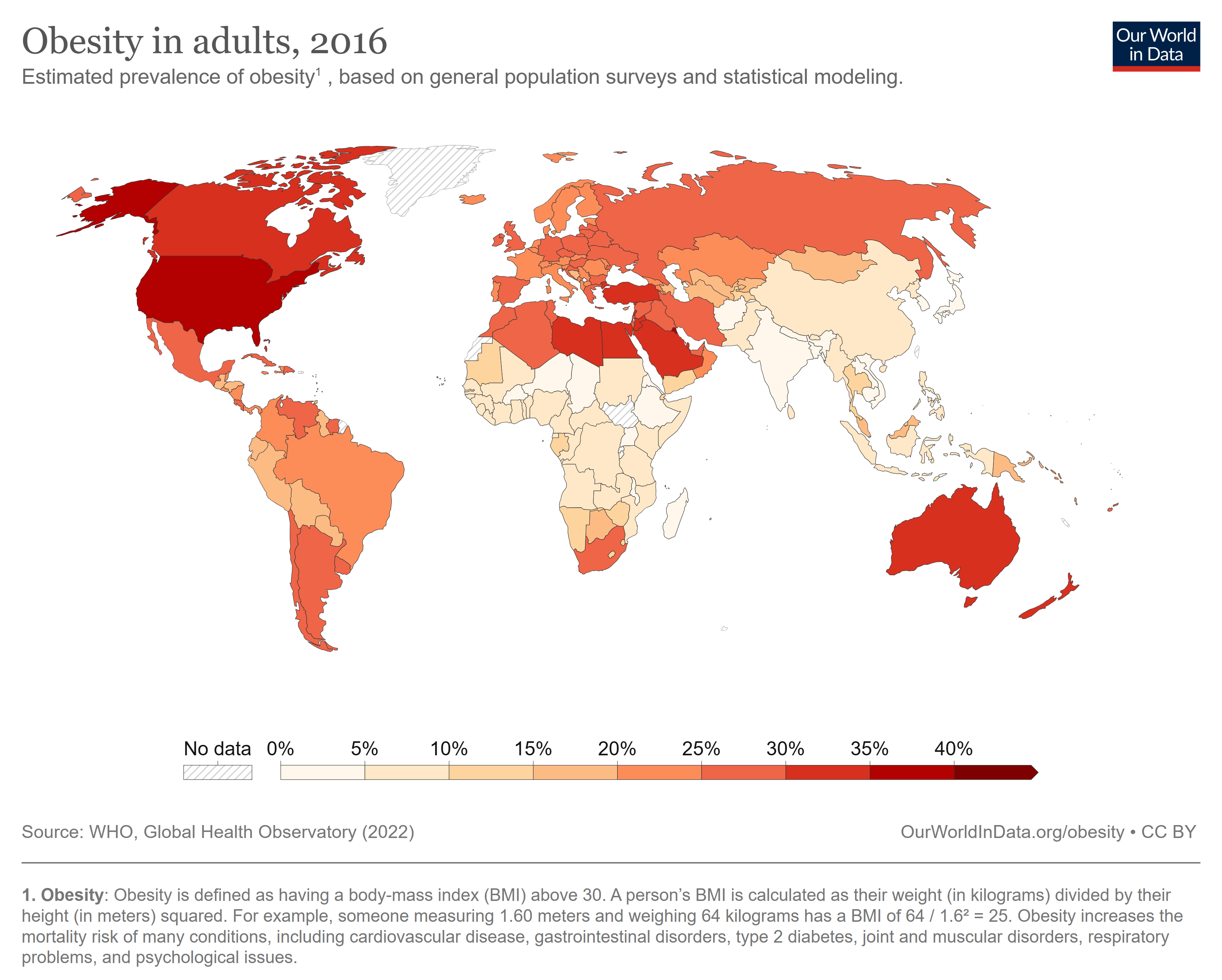
Prevalence of obesity worldwide.

For decades malnutrition has been understood mostly as undernutrition in low- and middle-income countries (LMICs). Although undernutrition decreased significantly from the early 1990s, the prevalence of obesity in the world has nearly tripled since 1975.

The coexistence of obesity and stunting is what has recently been named as the double burden of malnutrition.

In Ecuador according to the latest systematic review study (2019), the prevalence of obesity in children (age under 5 years) was 8.1% (95% CI 6.9, 9.3), 10.7% (95% CI 9.6, 11.7) in children (age 5–11 years), and 10.5% (95% CI 9.2, 11.8) in adolescent (age 12– 18 years). Adult populations (age >19 years) had a higher obesity rate of 44.2% (95 % CI 43.1, 45.4). Concomitantly, the prevalence of stunting in children aged under 5 years was 23.2% (95% CI 23.3, 23.5), a wide range (14.9-44 %) in children (age 5–11 years) and in adolescents, varied between 19 and 24.8%

Double burden of malnutrition in Ecuador
Prevalence in children (by age)	Under 5	5–11 years	12–18 years
Stunting	8.1%	14.9-44%	10.5%
Obesity	23.2%	10.7%	19-24.8%

The double burden of malnutrition its mainly related due to the economic and sociodemographic growth causing a modification of the diet patterns increasing the consumption of high energy aliments rich in fat and nutrient poor, combined with a sedentary lifestyle. According to the WHO, it is crucial to integrate dual duties to be able to coordinate a simultaneous approach focused on ending malnutrition.

== Social components ==
Afro-Ecuadorian children and Indigenous children are more likely to grow up in poverty and, as a result, face medical problems. Rates of chronic malnutrition are worse for Indigenous children.

== Environmental components ==
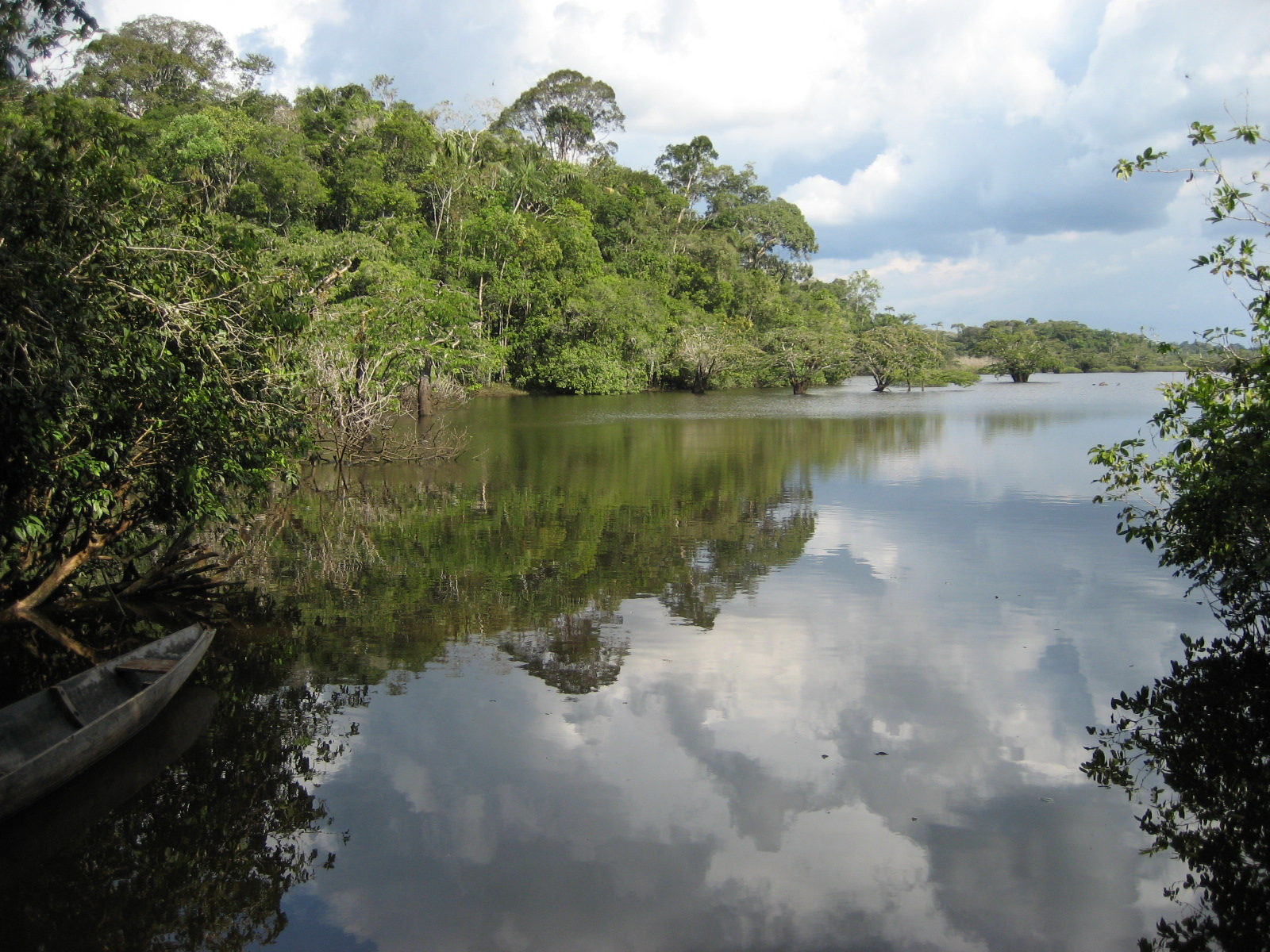
Lagoon in the Cuyabeno Wildlife Reserve

Ecuador is divided into four geographic regions; the Andes, the Amazon Basin, the Coast, and the Galapagos Islands. Harsh climates in each region pose several threats to human health. Due to the lack of oxygen in the Andes because of high altitude, altitude sickness may arise, primarily in tourists coming from low-altitude regions.

The Amazon's many species do pose threats to human health. Diseases like malaria and yellow fever can be transferred to humans by infected mosquitoes. Deforestation in the Amazon causes an increase in the number of cases of malaria because deforestation creates more breeding grounds for mosquitoes.

Access to clean drinking water is also an issue in Ecuador. Water-borne diseases like cholera can be transferred to humans through frequently drinking water that is not cleaned and filtered. Not treating wastewater and not having proper sewer systems pose the same threats. 26.6% of households in Ecuador do not have access to safe drinking water. On a national level, only 23.3% of wastewater is treated. 60% of households have sewer systems.

There are high amounts of air pollution in Ecuador. This can result in air-borne illnesses and respiratory problems.

== See also ==
- Casa del Hombre Doliente
- Water supply and sanitation in Ecuador
