= Jorge Perrone Galarza =

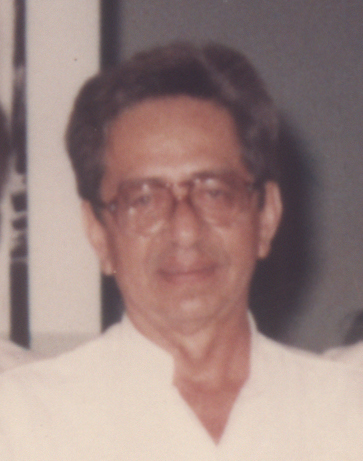

Mayor of Guayaquil, Ecuador
- In office 1986-1988
- Preceded by: Jorge Norero González
- Succeeded by: Elsa Bucaram Ortiz

Personal details
- Born: 18 August 1931 Guayaquil
- Died: 1 March 1994 (aged 62) Guayaquil

Jorge Perrone Galarza was Ecuador's Guayaquil Major from 1986 to 1988. He married Laura Delgado and was also father to Sonia, Bruno, Mario and Laura Perrone. Summa cum laude student, Perrone was Director of Urban Planning in Guayaquil for many years. As major he turned city's garbage dump into what today is known as Bellavista and legally protected Guayaquil's hill forests from irresponsible development.

Although not popularly known, Perrone was behind the development projects such as Malecon 2000 or Salado. Not being developed in those years for political reasons. Totalitarian authorities saved the project for later office occupation.

He died of liver complications in Guayaquil City on March 1, 1994.
