= Alex Jimbo Viteri =

Alex Jimbo Viteri (born July 29, 1986) is a violinist. He began to study the violin at age 2 and a half. His mother and brother are also musicians. Jimbo-Viteri studied with his mother Fany Viteri and Helene Orlova.

== Biography ==
Viteri was born in Guayaquil, Ecuador, and raised in a family of musicians. His first public presentation was at the age of four, and the first as soloist was at the age of five with the Antonio Vivaldi Children's Orchestra. At the age of six he was presented as soloist with the Guayaquil Symphony Orchestra. After many successes in competitions, at the age of ten he won the Competition “Young Ecuadorian Soloists” and performed the Accolay Violin Concerto with the National Symphony Orchestra of Ecuador. The following year he won an equivalent competition with the Guayaquil Symphony Orchestra. When he was twelve years old he won the Ninth National Competition for Young Soloist in Ecuador and performed the Mendelssohn Violin Concerto.Op.64 with the National Symphony Orchestra of Ecuador. Alex was the youngest member of the Ecuador Youth Symphony Orchestra and one of its founders. His performances have been broadcast on radio and TV. He was invited to participate in the master classes of famous violinist Shlomo Mintz in Israel. In the 2006 he was selected by Shlomo Mintz to perform with him the Bach:Concerto for Two Violins in D Minor, BWV 1043 with the National Symphony Orchestra of Ecuador.

Alex Jimbo-Viteri is considered a talented violinist, and as such has been invited to give several recitals. He was a member of the UBS Verbier Festival Orchestra, he took part of the Verbier Festival working with soloists and conductors such as Manfred Honeck, Zubin Mehta, Sir Andrew Davis, Anne-Sophie Mutter, Esa-Pekka Salonen, Evgeny Kissin, Mischa Maisky, Joshua Bell, Leonidas Kavakos, Hillary Hahn, Lang Lang, Maxim Vengerov. with the VFO, he was in concert tour through USA and Europe with Martha Argerich and Charles Dutoit.
