= Geovanni Camacho =

Ecuadorian footballer (born 1984)

Personal information
- Full name: Geovanni Francisco Camacho Paredes
- Date of birth: December 15, 1984 (age 41)
- Place of birth: Guayaquil, Ecuador
- Position: Goalkeeper

Team information
- Current team: Macará

Youth career
- 2002–2004: Barcelona

Senior career*
Years	Team	Apps	(Gls)
2000–2001	Rocafuerte	25	(0)
2003–2004	Barcelona	9	(0)
2005	Santa Rita	10	(0)
2005–2009	Barcelona	34	(0)
2010	Macará	3	(0)
2011–2012	Olmedo	11	(0)
2013	Deportivo Quevedo	35	(0)
2014	Mantá	10	(0)

International career^{‡}
2007–	Ecuador	1	(0)
- * Club domestic league appearances and goals as of 15 December 2009 ‡ National team caps and goals as of 15 December 2009

Geovanni Francisco Camacho Paredes (born December 15, 1984) is a football goalkeeper who most recently played for Mantá.

He was born in Guayaquil, Ecuador.

== Club career ==
He has also played for Macará.

== See also ==
- Football in Ecuador
- List of football clubs in Ecuador
