= Luis Miranda (painter) =

Ecuadorian artist (1932–2016)

- Born: 1932; Guayaquil, Ecuador
- Died: 2016 (aged 83–84); Guayaquil, Ecuador
- Education: School of Fine Arts of Guayaquil; Accademia di Belle Arti di Roma
- Known for: Painting
- Spouse: Gloria Guerrero

Luis Miranda (1932 in Guayaquil, Ecuador – 2016 in Guayaquil, Ecuador) was an Ecuadorian master painter.

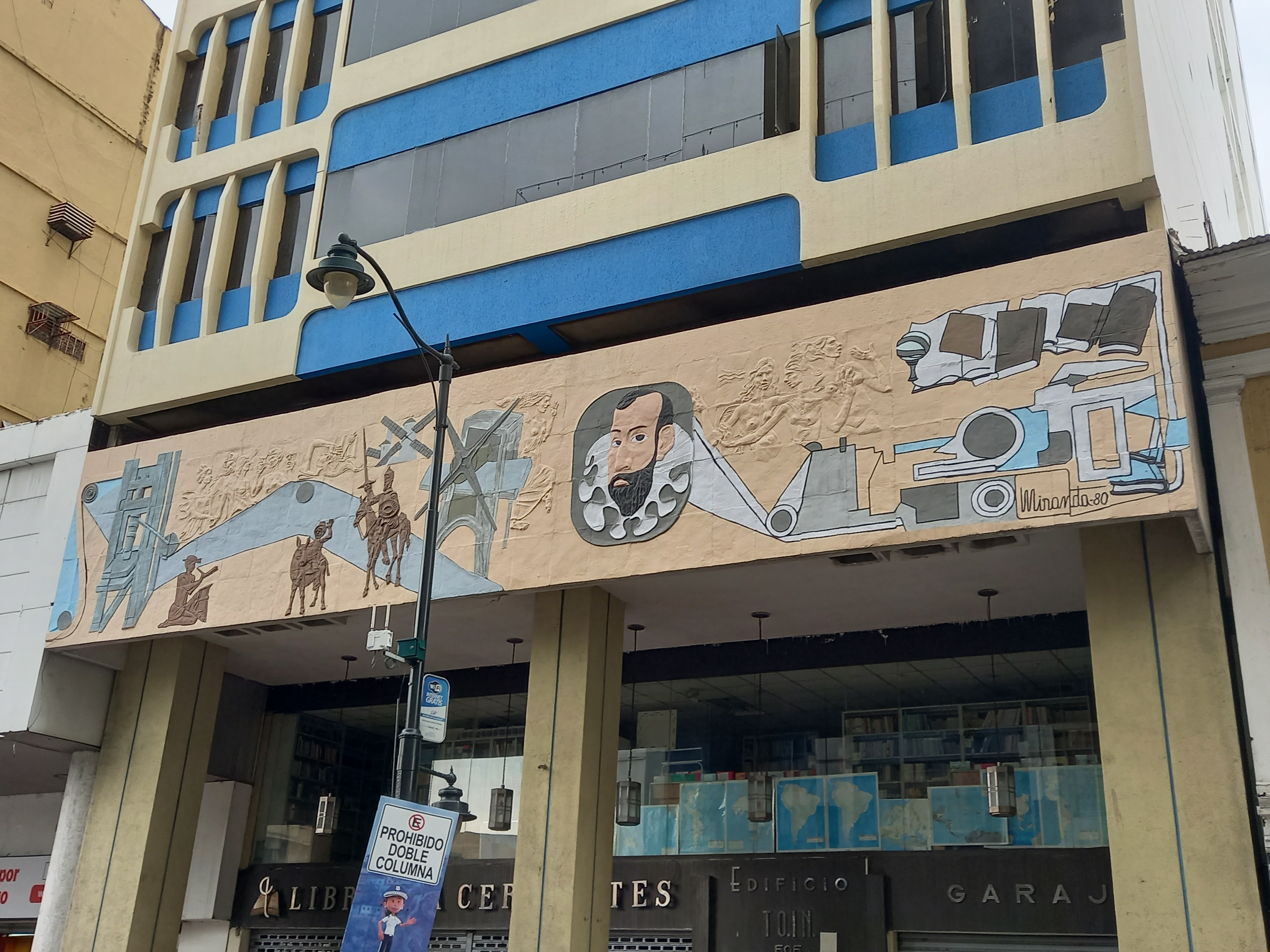

Miranda was born in 1932 to Pedro Miranda Martinez and Dolores Neira Peñafiel. Miranda's childhood memories were of harvesting honey from his family's many beehives, which they owned all along the route from Empalme to Guayaquil. Miranda was always drawing as a child, scribbling away on any paper that he could find and copying art from books that his mother had in the house.

Miranda finished his primary studies in Cuenca, where his parents had transferred for work related reasons. Miranda later returned to the port city to attend secondary school at the School Vicente Rocafuerte. In 1950, Miranda's passion for art led him to enroll in the School of Fine Arts in Guayaquil to be mentored by Hans Michaelson and Caesar Andrade Faini.

In 1955, Miranda graduated from the School of Fine Arts and was granted a scholarship by UNESCO to travel Europe and settle in Italy. Miranda attended the Academy of Fine Arts of Rome where he graduated in 1961. The impressive quality of his work earned Miranda many praises from the art critics of the "eternal city". Miranda obtained the First Prize "Via Marguta" and the Prize "Fiat" in 1959; The First Prize "Vittorio Grassi", the "Odescalchi Glass", of Brasiano, and the silver medal by "Il Giornale Di Italy", in 1960. Miranda was influenced by great Italian masters such as: Americo Bertoldi, Mario Mafai, Jarvi Lini, Pericles Pazinni and many others.

In 1961, Miranda returned to Ecuador but was disturbed by its exhausting atmosphere socially, politically and artistically. Miranda was turned off by the Indeginist art scene that dominated in Ecuador for many decades, so he decided to move to New York City. Miranda lived in the New York and New Jersey until 1976.

In 1973, even in his absence, Miranda's work earned him the Second painting Prize of Hall Julio in Guayaquil and the Second painting Prize of Hall October. After returning to Ecuador in 1976, Miranda dedicated himself to art education.

In 1976, Miranda obtained the First Painting Prize in Hall Julio and Hall October; In 1978, the National Painting Prize of the Central Bank; In 1982, The National Painting Prize of Ecuador; In 1984, Gold Medal to the Artic Merit of the Municipality of Guayaquil.

In the late eighties, Miranda was a professor in the Faculty of Architecture at the Catholic University in Guayaquil. Miranda married his partner Gloria Guerrero who spent her weekends painting alongside her husband. Gloria & Luis moved from Guayaquil to the coast to live in Chanduy, where Miranda focused on painting the life happening around him: daily life on the coast, the working people, the fisherman and their boats, men throwing nets, the sea, the estuary.

Miranda continued to paint every morning. "I have so many ideas for painting, the illusion of paint every day is what keeps me alive".
