= Francisco Nazareno =

Ecuadorian footballer (born 1993)

Personal information
- Full name: Francisco Efren Nazareno Mercado
- Date of birth: December 13, 1993 (age 32)
- Place of birth: Guayaquil, Ecuador
- Position: Centre midfielder

Team information
- Current team: Barcelona
- Number: 27

Youth career
- 2008––: Barcelona
- 2009: Independiente José Terán
- 2010: Deportivo Quito

Senior career*
Years	Team	Apps	(Gls)
2010	Deportivo Quito	3	(0)
2011–	Barcelona	1	(0)
- * Club domestic league appearances and goals as of January 30, 2011

Francisco Efren Nazareno Mercado (born December 13, 1993) is an Ecuadorian footballer. He currently plays midfield for Barcelona.
