= Biblioteca Municipal de Guayaquil =

Coordinates: 2.196438°S 79.882607°W

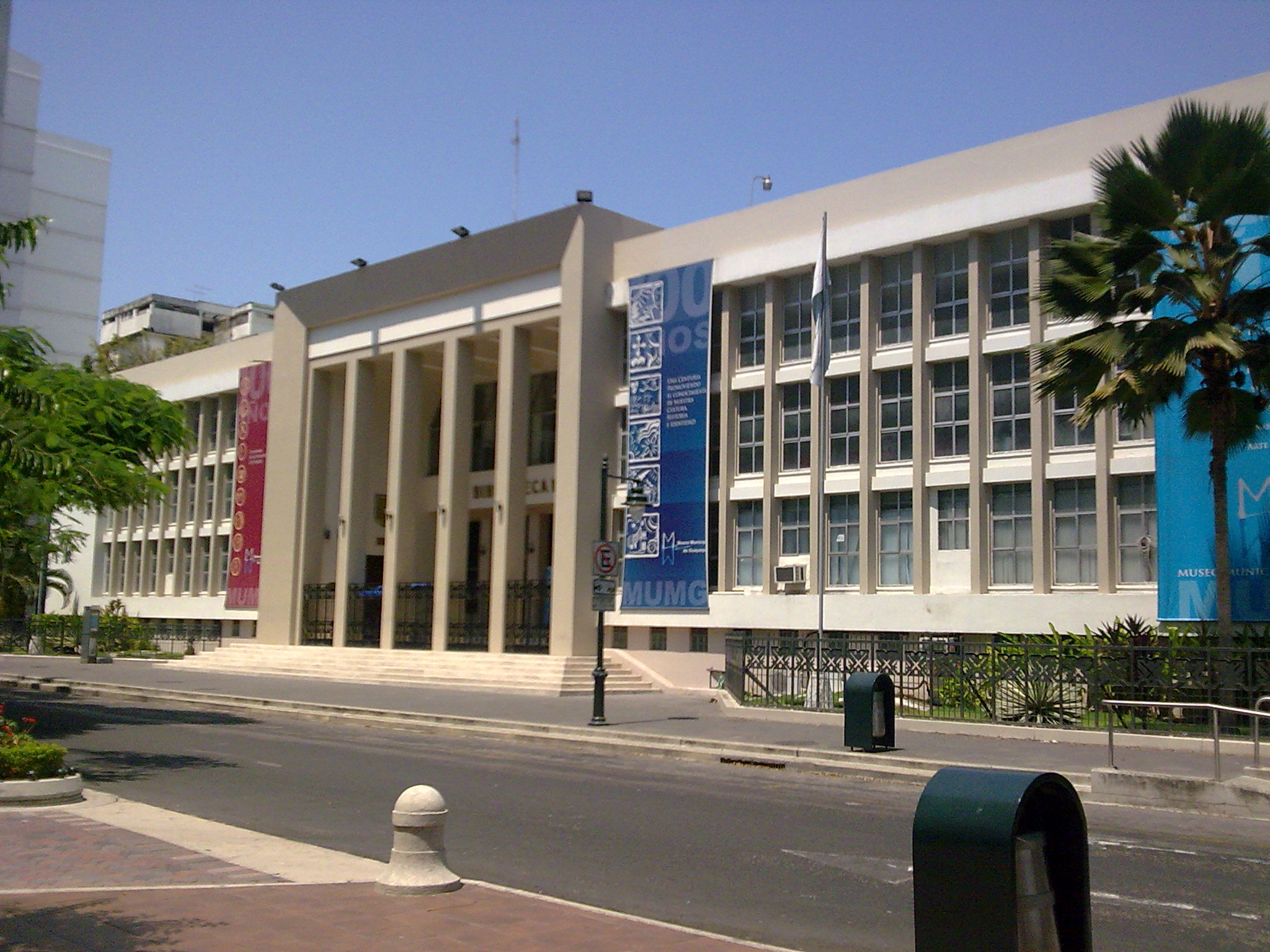
Biblioteca Municipal de Guayaquil

Biblioteca Municipal de Guayaquil (Guayaquil Municipal Library) is a public library in Guayaquil, Ecuador and is operated by the municipal government.

The library was founded on March 24, 1862, by Pedro Carbo, who drafted the municipal ordinance establishing it and also made an initial donation of 100 volumes from his personal collection, with the aim of encouraging the residents of Guayaquil to follow his example. The ordinance was published in the Municipal Gazette No. 3 on February 15, 1862. Pedro Carbo was the mayor at the time. It is the most comprehensive library on Ecuador's coast and one of the largest in Ecuador. Its current inventory stands at 2 million volumes, and it continually receives donations of all kinds from citizens and companies interested in culture, which is the basis for its extensive collection. The current building was constructed in the 1950s, thanks to financial support from businessman Josef Gorelik, who at the time owned Pepsi. Today, the facility no longer meets the standards necessary to provide quality service to the public, and it is expected that in the coming years, construction will begin on the new library in the block across from the World Trade Center on Francisco de Orellana Avenue.
