= Guayaquil =

Most populous city in Ecuador

Guayaquil Santiago de Guayaquil
- City
- Santiago of Guayaquil
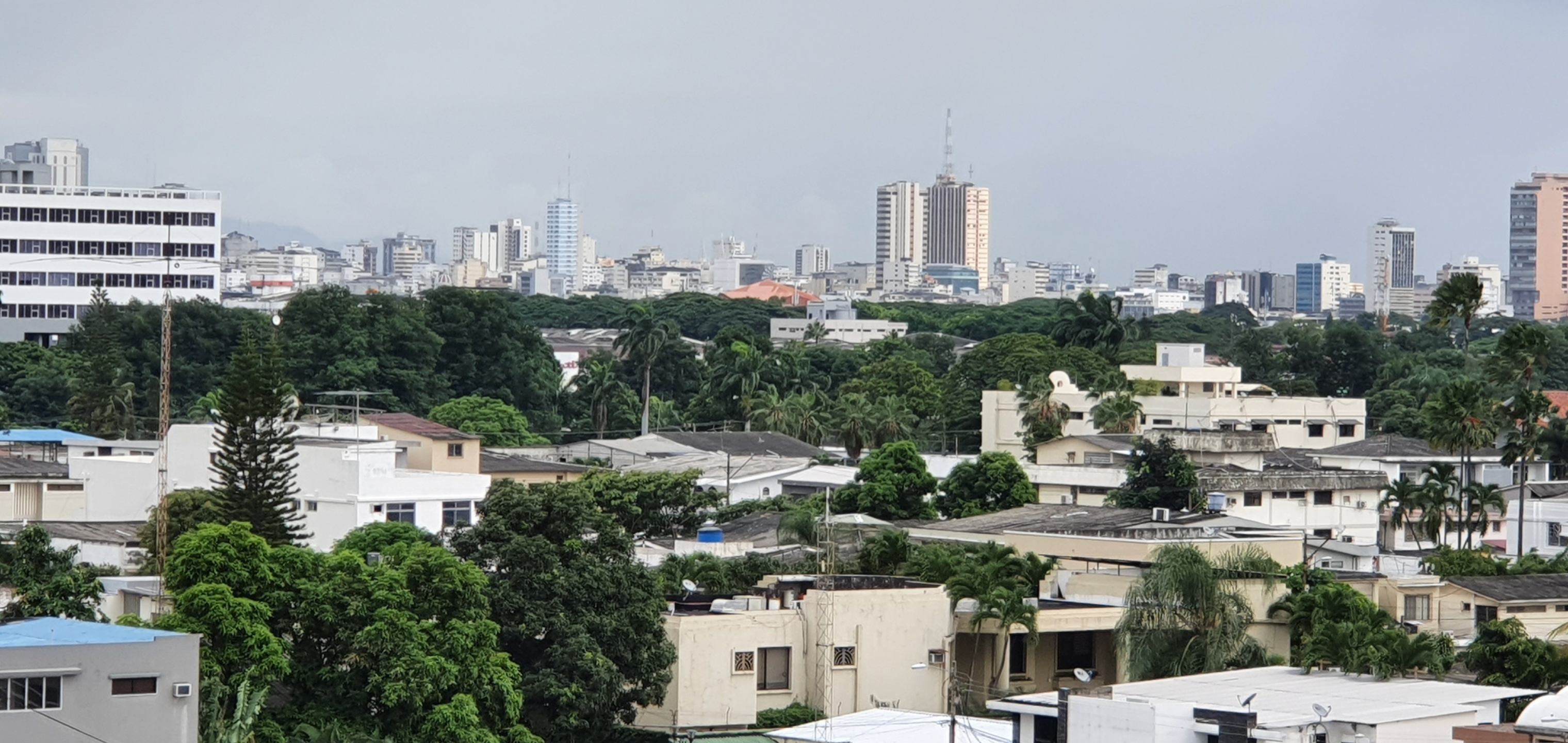
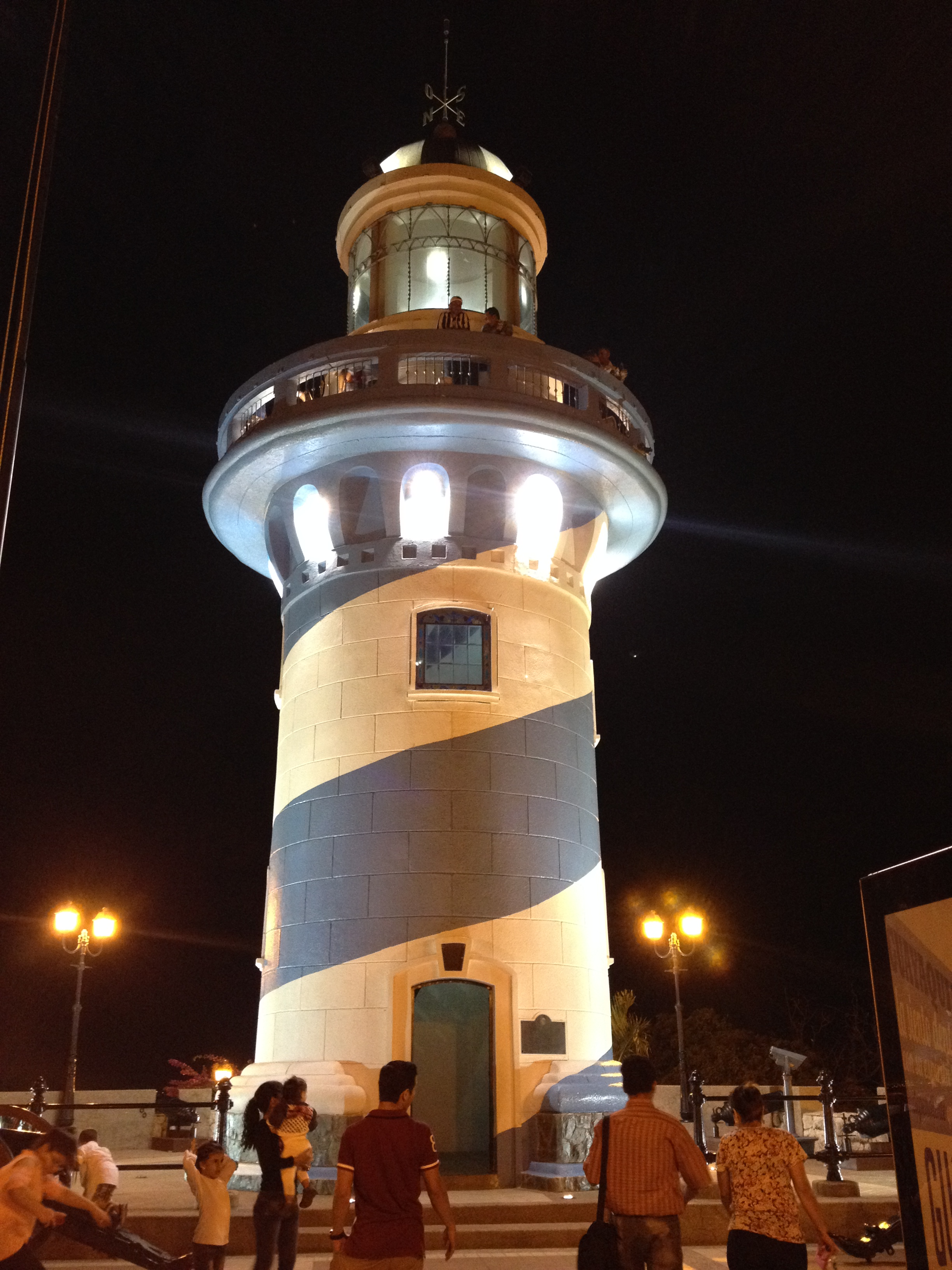
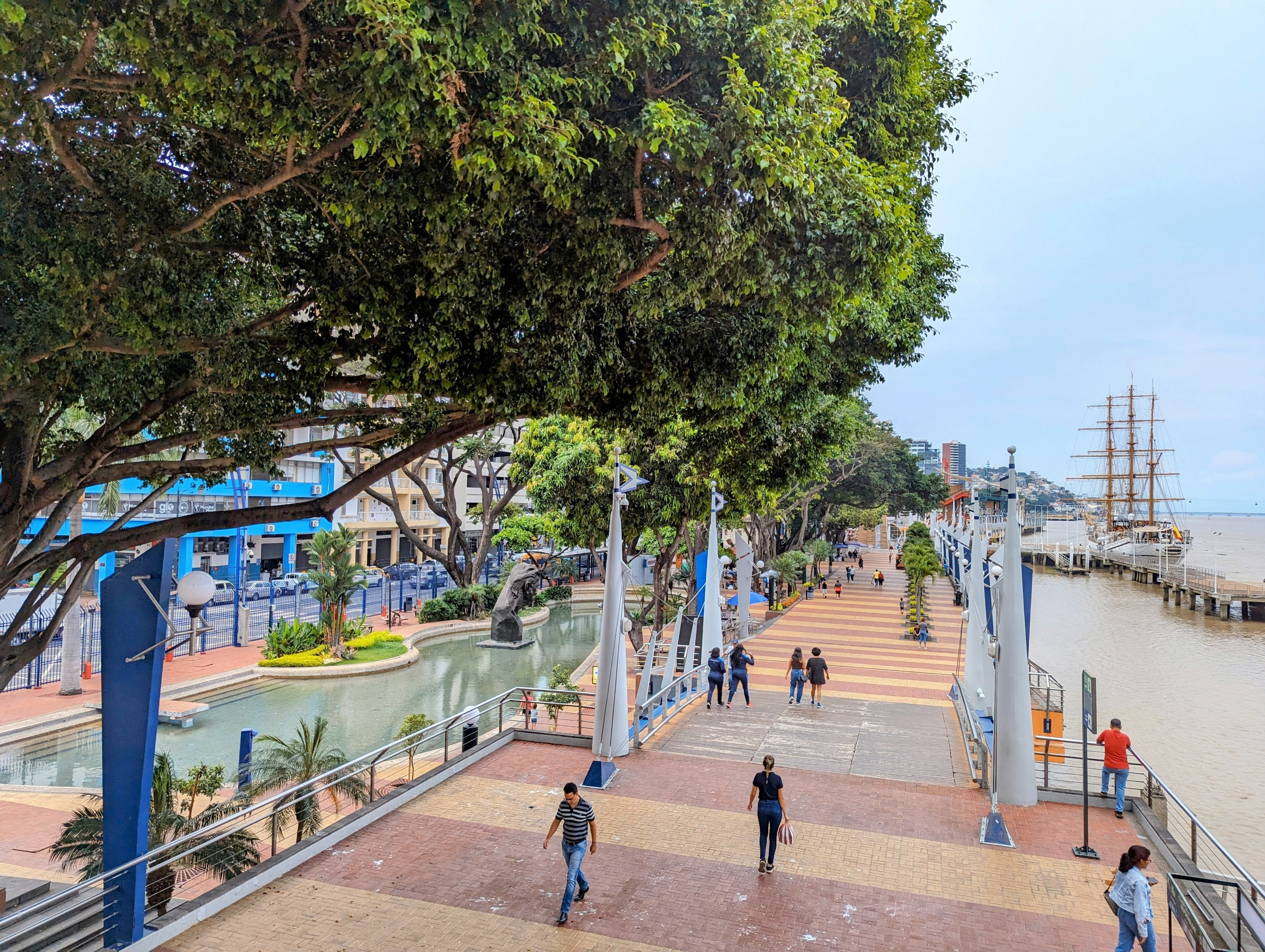
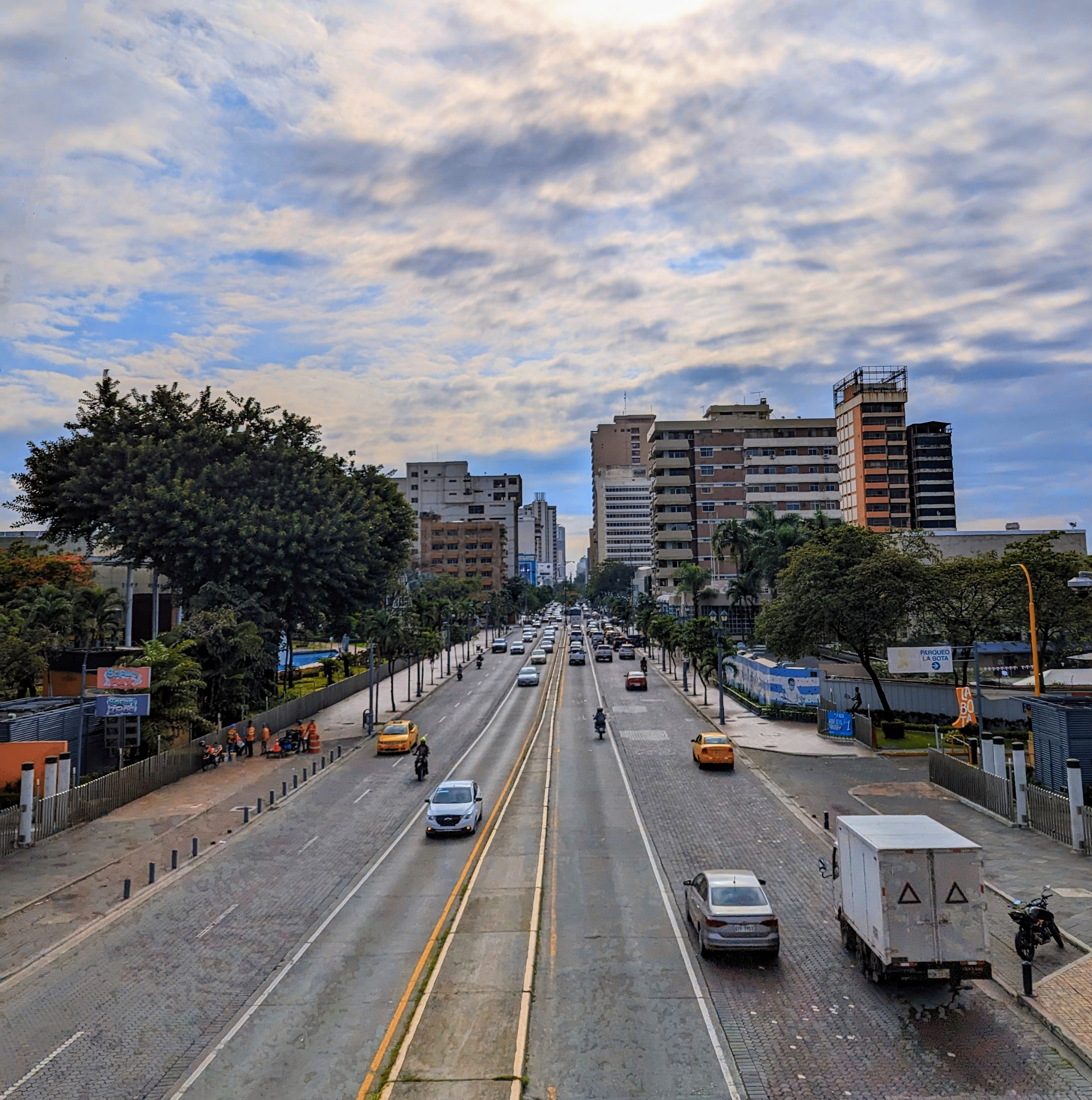
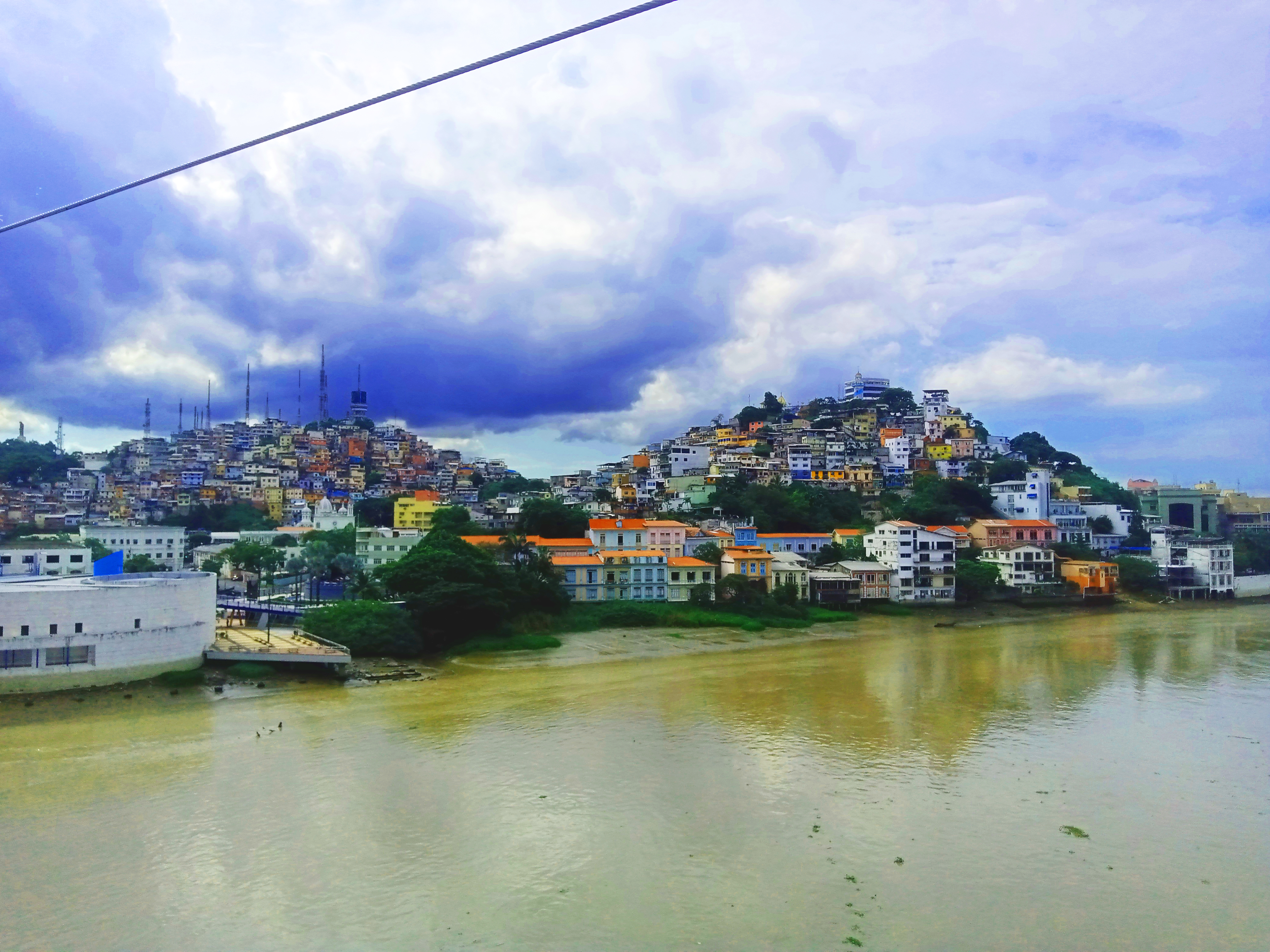
- Skyline of Guayaquil Lighthouse on Santa Ana Hill Guayaquil Metropolitan Cathedral Malecón 2000 Ninth of October Avenue (Avenida Nueve de Octubre) Guayaquil, with the Guayas River in the foreground

- Flag Coat of arms
- Nickname: La Perla del Pacífico; The Pearl of the Pacific
- Motto(s): Por Guayaquil Independiente; For Independent Guayaquil
- Anthem: Canción al 9 de octubre Song of October Ninth
- Location within Ecuador Location within South America
- Coordinates: 02°11′24″S 79°53′15″W
- Country: Ecuador
- Province: Guayas
- Canton: Guayaquil
- Spanish foundation: 25 July 1535
- Independence: 9 October 1820
- Founder: Francisco de Orellana
- Named for: Guayas and Quil
- Urban parishes: 16 urban parishes

Government
  - Type: Mayor and council
  - Governing body: Municipality of Guayaquil
  - Mayor: Aquiles Álvarez
  - Vice-Mayor: Tatiana Coronel

Area
  - City: 344.5 km^{2} (133.0 sq mi)
  - Land: 316.42 km^{2} (122.17 sq mi)
  - Water: 28.08 km^{2} (10.84 sq mi)
  - Metro: 2,493.86 km^{2} (962.88 sq mi)
- Elevation: 4 m (13 ft)

Population (2022)
  - City: 2,650,288
  - Rank: 1st in Ecuador; 10th in South America
  - Density: 8,375.9/km^{2} (21,693/sq mi)
  - Urban: 3,094,420
  - Metro: 3,193,267
- Demonym(s): Guayaquileño, Guayaco

GDP (PPP, constant 2015 values)
  - Year: 2023
  - Total: $42.9 billion
  - Per capita: $13,600
- Time zone: UTC−5 (ECT)
- Postal code: EC090150
- Area code: (0)4
- Vehicle registration: G
- Languages: Spanish
- Climate: Aw
- Website: Municipality of Guayaquil

Guayaquil (Spanish pronunciation: [ɡwaʝaˈkil]), officially Santiago de Guayaquil, is the capital of Guayas Province and the seat of Guayaquil Canton. It is the largest city in Ecuador and also the nation's economic capital and main port. The city is located on the west bank of the Guayas River, which flows into the Pacific Ocean at the Gulf of Guayaquil.

With a population of more than 3,000,000, it is the most populous city in the country and the fifth largest in the Andean Community. However, its urban fabric extends beyond its official urban parishes, encompassing nearby cities and parishes, making it the most populous urban agglomeration in the nation, and fifth in the Andean Community. As the largest city, it is one of the two main development poles of the country—alongside Quito, the national capital—hosting Ecuador's main business, financial, cultural, and sports institutions.

After several failed founding attempts, it was definitively established in July 25, 1535 under the name "Santiago de Guayaquil" as a shipyard and port for trade in service of the Spanish Empire. From that moment, it became a key hub in the economy of the Spanish colony and later of the nation. Guayaquil has been the site of major revolutions and uprisings throughout its history, being the first Ecuadorian city to definitively achieve its independence from Spain in October 9, 1820. It later served as the capital of the Free Province of Guayaquil, which was subsequently annexed to Gran Colombia. Since 1830, it has been part of the Republic of Ecuador, playing a significant economic and political role.

Guayaquil stands out among Ecuadorian cities for its high use of mass transit, total population density, and diversity. The city's port is one of the most important on the eastern Pacific coast. About 70% of the country's private exports leave through its facilities, and 83% of imports enter through them.

== Nomenclature ==
The origin of the name Santiago de Guayaquil has been much discussed, although 'Guayaquil' is pre-Hispanic. Since the founding of the city by the Spanish in 1534, it has been linked to the name of Santiago in memory of its patron saint, St James, apostle of Christ. He is also designated as patron saint of several other Spanish American colonial cities, such as Santiago de Chile, as he is of Spain.

A theory based on a romantic legend, transmitted orally, attributes the name Guayaquil to the joining of the name of a leader named Guayas and of his wife Quil. They are symbols of the local resistance that—according to local tradition—chose to fight to the death (and as a final act, set fire to the town), rather than surrender to the Spanish conquerors.

A town with a name similar to Guayaquil is located near the city of Durán (Autopista Durán-Boliche km. 23). Investigations by archeologists and historians has led them to conclude that when the town was conquered by the Spanish, it was ruled by a man named Guayaquile.

They have not determined if the man or the town was first to receive that name. But researcher Ángel Véliz Mendoza, in his book on the man Guayaquile, says that there are at least seven references to the toponym in pre-1543 documents. It is believed that the name Guayaquil is taken from the population's final home, in lands of the chief Guayaquile. This region was occupied by the chonos, people whose archeological name (in Spanish) is Cultura Milagro-Quevedo.

After several location changes and fires, the city was founded in 1547, and named the "Muy Noble y Muy Leal Ciudad de Santiago de Guayaquil" ("Very noble and very loyal city of Santiago de Guayaquil"). After the city's independence in 1820, the words "very noble and very loyal" disappeared from use, as the city was no longer part of the Spanish Empire. Today, the official name of Santiago de Guayaquil is seldom used outside of official contexts.

== History ==
Engraving depicting a map of Guayaquil in 1741

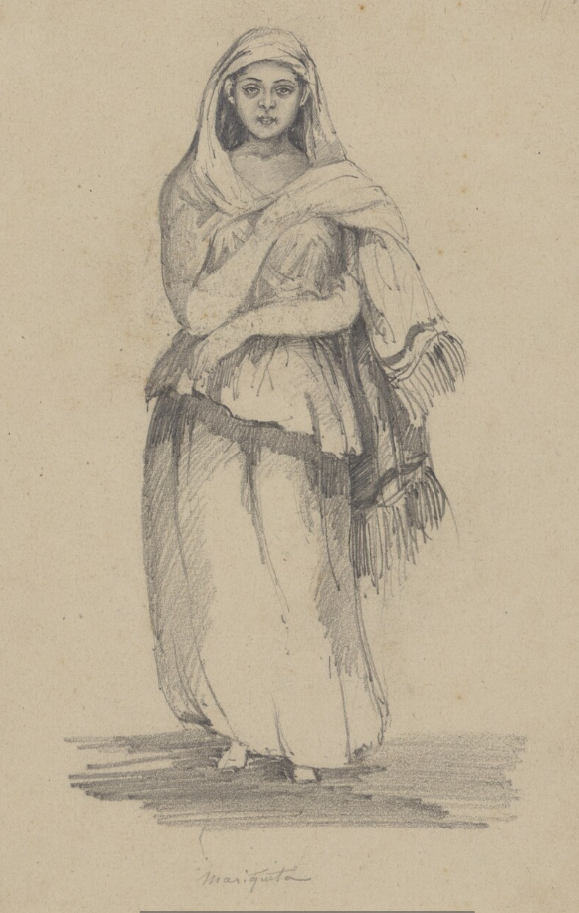
Mariquita, a young mestiza woman from Guayaquil in 1847–48, by Adele de Dombasle

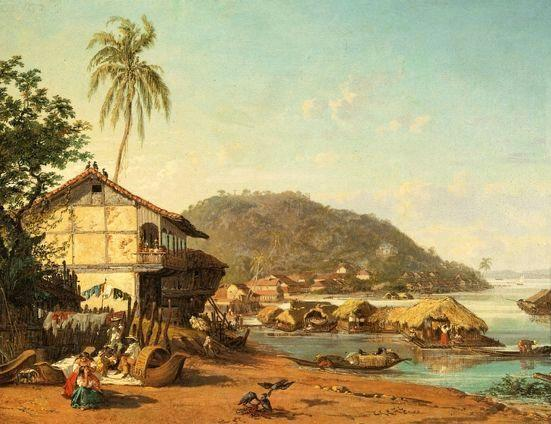
The Port of Guayaquil, 1846 painting

Guayaquil was founded on 25 July 1538 by Spanish conqueror Francisco de Orellana in the location of a native village. He named it as Muy Noble y Muy Leal Ciudad de Santiago de Guayaquil ("Most Noble and Most Loyal City of Santiago de Guayaquil").

On 20 April 1687, Guayaquil was attacked and looted by English and French pirates under the command of George Dew (English), and Picard and Groniet (French). Of more than 260 pirates, 35 were killed and 46 were wounded; 75 defenders of the city died and more than 100 were wounded.

In 1709, English captains including Woodes Rogers and William Dampier, along with a crew of 110, looted Guayaquil and demanded ransom. But they departed suddenly and without collecting the ransom after an epidemic of yellow fever broke out.

In colonial times Guayaquil was the chief Spanish shipyard in the Pacific, although some navigators considered that Valdivia (now in Chile) had better conditions.

Guayaquil was a stopover point in the commerce between Asia and Latin America conducted via Philippines-based Manila galleons. The trade route had links to Acapulco in present-day Mexico and terminated with a node in Callao, Peru.

In the late eighteenth century, the majority of slaves in the region were located in Guayaquil. Their lives and work were conditioned by a practice called jornal. The owners held them legally but the jornalado slaves had "considerable independence" in exchange for paying their owners a fee (the jornal) every day. Such enslaved Native Americans, such as María Chiquinquirá, would work inside urban homes. (She was a local hero because she successfully went to court in 1794 to argue for her freedom.) Other jornalado enslaved men worked alongside free workers in the shipyards.

By the turn of the nineteenth century, slaves had fought for their freedom in increasing numbers. Together they formed a social group known as the plebe.

On 9 October 1820, almost without bloodshed, a group of civilians, supported by soldiers from the "Granaderos de Reserva" battalion quartered in Guayaquil, led by the Peruvian Colonel Gregorio Escobedo, overwhelmed the resistance of the Royalist guards and arrested the Spanish authorities. Guayaquil declared independence from Spain, becoming the "Provincia Libre de Guayaquil". José Joaquín de Olmedo was named Jefe Civil of Guayaquil.

Departing from Guayaquil, General Antonio José de Sucre, sent by Simón Bolivar and supported by a division promised by José de San Martín, led the allied independence army in the Battle of Pichincha. His victory confirmed the independence of the Gran Colombia and also what would become the future Republic of Ecuador.

On 26 July 1822, generals José de San Martín and Simón Bolívar held a meeting in Guayaquil to plan how to complete achieving the independence of Perú and, with it, all of Spanish South America. In 1829, the city was invaded by the Peruvian Army, which occupied it for seven months.

In 1860, the city was the site of the Battle of Guayaquil, the last of a series of military conflicts between the forces of the Provisional Government, led by Gabriel García Moreno and General Juan José Flores, and the forces of the Supreme Chief of Guayas, General Guillermo Franco, whose government was recognized as possessing sovereignty over the Ecuadorian territory by Peruvian president Ramón Castilla. Moreno's forces were victorious, countering Peruvian influence over Ecuador.

In 1896, large portions of the city were destroyed by a fire.

On 8 July 1898, the Guayaquil City Hall Muy Ilustre Municipalidad de Guayaquil officially recognized the anthem written by José Joaquín de Olmedo in 1821, with the music composed by Ana Villamil Ycaza in 1895, as the Himno al 9 de Octubre or Canción al Nueve de Octubre, most widely known now as the Himno a Guayaquil (Guayaquil Anthem).

In 1922, workers in the city went on a general strike lasting three days, ending after at least 300 people were killed by military and police.

In 2020, the city was hit hard by the COVID-19 pandemic. Its medical and mortuary services were overwhelmed to the point where bodies lay in the streets. Almost 6,000 more deaths were recorded in the first two weeks of April than the average for the same period in other years.

== Economy ==
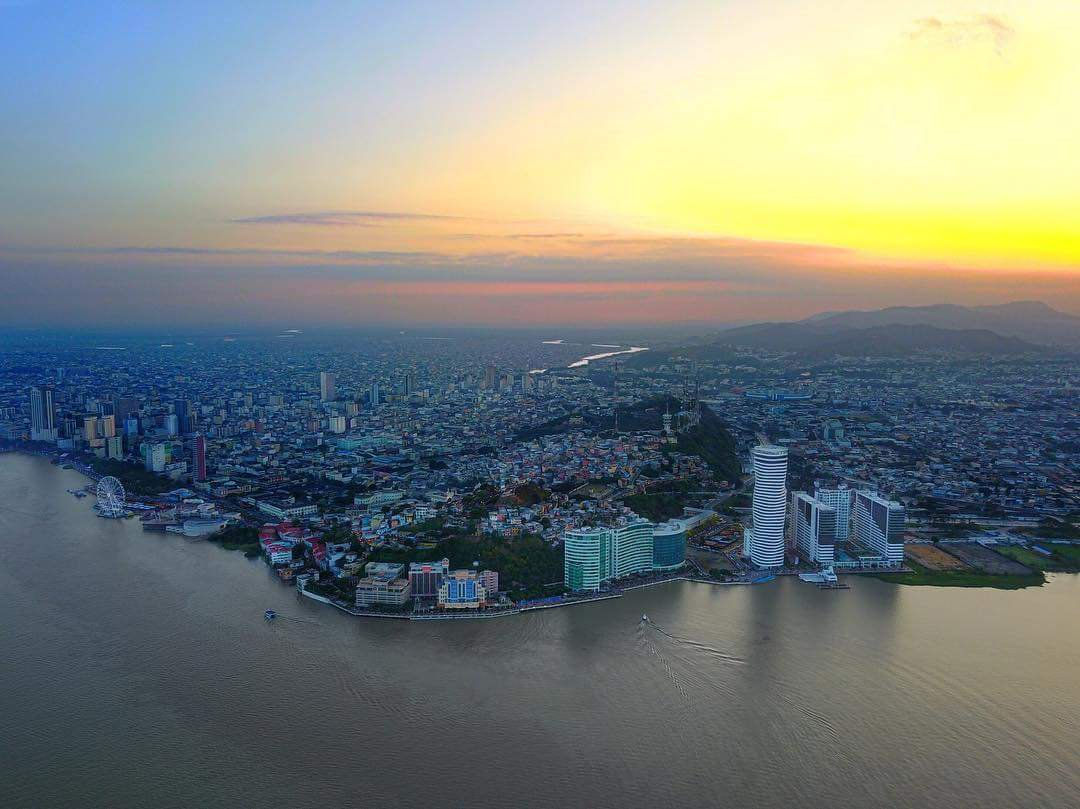
Aerial view of Guayaquil

Guayaquileños' main sources of income are formal and informal trade, business, agriculture and aquaculture. Most commerce consists of small and medium businesses, adding an important informal economy occupation that gives thousands of guayaquileños employment.

The Port of Guayaquil is Ecuador's most important commercial port; most international import and export merchandise passes through the Gulf of Guayaquil. As the largest city in the country, most industries are located either in the city or its peripheral areas.

=== Tourism ===
Guayaquil plays an important role in Ecuador's economy as the commercial heart of the country, and is also a vibrant, sprawling city, urban, cultural and touristic. In recent years, the city has become a business and convention destination. Half a dozen skyscrapers give it the profile of a major city that continues to expand to the north and west. The city centre of Guayaquil is one of the most important tourist destinations, as it is the oldest and most colonial part of the city. The Simón Bolívar Malecón area is of great tourist interest and located close to the city centre. The Point, located in the Puerto Santa Ana district, is the largest building in Guayaquil and the whole of Ecuador. Another place of interest is the Las Peñas neighbourhood, where approximately 444 steps lead up to a viewpoint offering stunning city views.

Here are some of the tourist attractions in Guayaquil:

- Torre Morisca.
- Malecon 2000.
- Seminario Park or Iguana Park.
- Las Peñas neighbourhood.
- Guayaquil Cathedral.
- Governor's Palace.
- City hall of Guayaquil.
- Plaza de la Administracion
- La Rotonda hemicycle.
- Puerto Santa Ana.
- MAAC.
- Nahim Isaias Museum.
- Puerto Santa Ana

Its geographical location makes it the gateway to the Galapagos Islands and it has won several World Travel Awards. These include: South America's Leading City Break Destination and South America's Leading Meetings and Conferences Destination.

Guayaquil is a city that offers a wide variety of activities and events. In addition to excursions or tours: shopping tours, gastronomic tours, religious tours, or tours in agritourism haciendas. A good alternative to get to know the city are the free tours offered by the Municipality of Guayaquil. Or also some of the self-guided tours that are offered to get to know the city. There are also maps to get to know the city, including a digital map that can be downloaded and used to visit the city's tourist attractions.

== Government ==
As of 2020, Guayaquil's mayor was Cynthia Viteri. Viteri is the second elected female mayor in the city's history; the first was Elsa Bucaram in 1988. The previous mayor, Jaime Nebot, endorsed her. A campaign of construction projects for the city began in the early 2000s to attract tourism. The "urban regeneration" plan reconstructed the city's main tourist streets' sidewalks and upgraded the city's chaotic transit system with multiple infrastructure projects (speedways, bridges, overhead passages, tunnels, etc.).

In August 2006, the city's first rapid transit bus system, Metrovía, opened to provide a quicker, high-capacity service. One of the main projects was called Malecón 2000 [maleˈkon dos ˈmil], the renovation of the waterfront promenade (malecón) along the Guayas River. Another project was the creation of the Nuevo Parque Histórico, a park in a housing development area that is called Entre Ríos because it lies between the Daule and Babahoyo rivers (which merge to form the Guayas River) in a mangrove wetland area. The park cost the city about US$7 million.

In 2013, the national government led by Rafael Correa built two pedestrian bridges connecting downtown Guayaquil, Santay Island, and the town of Durán, to allow people to make ecotourism trips and return the same day.

== Geography ==
Guayaquil is the nation's largest city and the capital of Guayas Province. It is on the Guayas River about 60 km (40 mi) north of the Gulf of Guayaquil, near the Equator.

Guayaquil faces major earthquake threats due to its soil stratigraphy and location on the ring of fire and the south of the North-Andean subduction zone.

The city can be easily damaged by earthquakes as its weak and compressible soil is composed of deep soft sediments over hard rocks and deposits in a brackish environment. Also, the city itself is strongly affected by the subduction of the active Ecuadorian margin, an intraplate region where active faults locate; and the Guayaquil-Babahoyo strike-slip fault system, formed as the North Andean Block drifts northward.

The tsunami threat is caused by the nearby Gulf of Guayaquil which also is one of the major locations on the Earth where earthquakes tend to happen all the time. It has complex tectonic features such as the Posorja and the Jambeli – two major east–west trending detachment systems; the Puna-Santa Clara northeast-southwest trending fault system; and the Domito north-south trending fault system; that have developed since the Pleistocene times. Tsunami threats are only predicted for coastal farming zones, not the main populated areas.

Guayaquil, along with most of the coastal region, was impacted by the 16 April 2016 earthquake of 7.8 magnitude. A bridge that was above a major artery, Avenida de las Americas, collapsed in the early evening on that day, killing two people.

=== Climate ===
Guayaquil features a tropical savanna climate (Köppen: Aw). Between January and April, the climate is hot and humid with heavy rainfall, especially during El Niño years when it increases dramatically and flooding usually occurs. The rest of the year (from May through December), however, rainfall is minimal due to the cooling influence of the Humboldt Current, with usually cloudy mornings and afternoons, and evening breezes.

Climate data for Guayaquil (1991–2020)
Month	Jan	Feb	Mar	Apr	May	Jun	Jul	Aug	Sep	Oct	Nov	Dec	Year
Record high °C (°F)	37.2 (99.0)	35.5 (95.9)	36.8 (98.2)	36.5 (97.7)	36.4 (97.5)	36.1 (97.0)	34.6 (94.3)	35.0 (95.0)	35.5 (95.9)	36.0 (96.8)	36.4 (97.5)	37.0 (98.6)	37.2 (99.0)
Mean daily maximum °C (°F)	31.4 (88.5)	31.2 (88.2)	31.8 (89.2)	32.2 (90.0)	31.6 (88.9)	30.5 (86.9)	29.5 (85.1)	29.7 (85.5)	30.6 (87.1)	31.1 (88.0)	31.6 (88.9)	31.9 (89.4)	31.2 (88.2)
Daily mean °C (°F)	27.1 (80.8)	27.0 (80.6)	27.3 (81.1)	27.5 (81.5)	27.1 (80.8)	25.9 (78.6)	25.0 (77.0)	25.0 (77.0)	25.6 (78.1)	25.9 (78.6)	26.4 (79.5)	27.1 (80.8)	26.4 (79.5)
Mean daily minimum °C (°F)	22.8 (73.0)	22.8 (73.0)	22.9 (73.2)	22.8 (73.0)	22.5 (72.5)	21.4 (70.5)	20.6 (69.1)	20.3 (68.5)	20.6 (69.1)	20.8 (69.4)	21.2 (70.2)	22.2 (72.0)	21.7 (71.1)
Record low °C (°F)	18.5 (65.3)	15.8 (60.4)	18.0 (64.4)	18.3 (64.9)	17.0 (62.6)	15.6 (60.1)	14.5 (58.1)	15.0 (59.0)	15.1 (59.2)	14.0 (57.2)	16.5 (61.7)	14.0 (57.2)	14.0 (57.2)
Average precipitation mm (inches)	224.2 (8.83)	286.0 (11.26)	315.4 (12.42)	208.5 (8.21)	64.0 (2.52)	18.3 (0.72)	4.2 (0.17)	1.0 (0.04)	2.4 (0.09)	5.2 (0.20)	8.5 (0.33)	48.0 (1.89)	1,185.7 (46.68)
Average precipitation days (≥ 1.0 mm)	14.2	16.5	17.8	11.4	4.2	1.8	0.5	0.1	0.3	0.5	0.8	3.6	71.7
Average relative humidity (%)	78.4	81.2	80.9	79.5	77.4	76.8	75.1	73.4	72.8	73.1	73.5	74.9	76.4
Mean monthly sunshine hours	127.1	96.0	139.5	153.0	176.7	129.0	117.8	139.5	150.0	155.0	153.0	148.8	1,685.4
Source 1: World Meteorological Organization
Source 2: NOAA, Weather.Directory

== City sectors ==
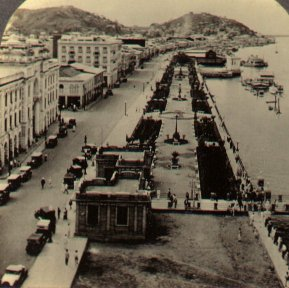
Guayaquil's waterfront around 1920

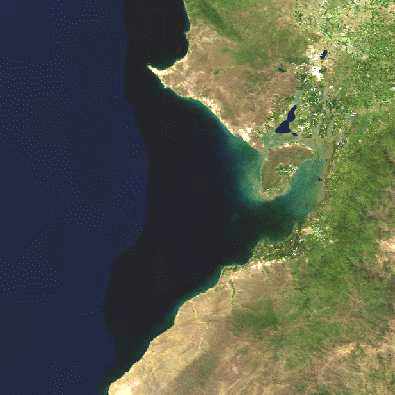
Gulf of Guayaquil

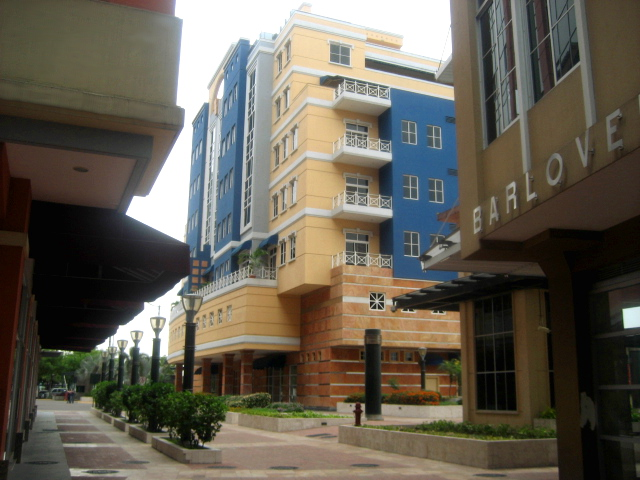
Buildings in Puerto Santa Ana

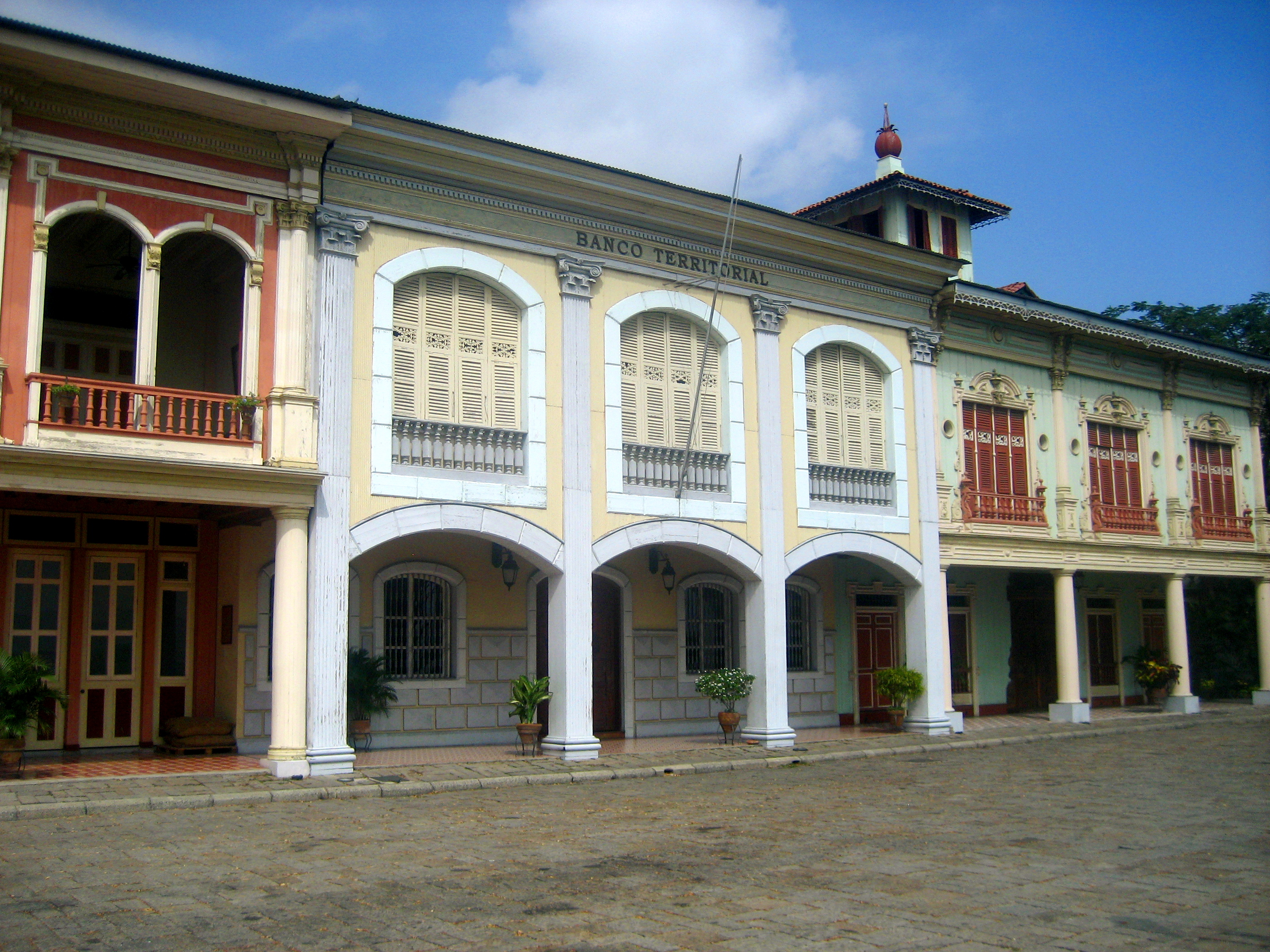
Historic buildings in the Parque Histórico

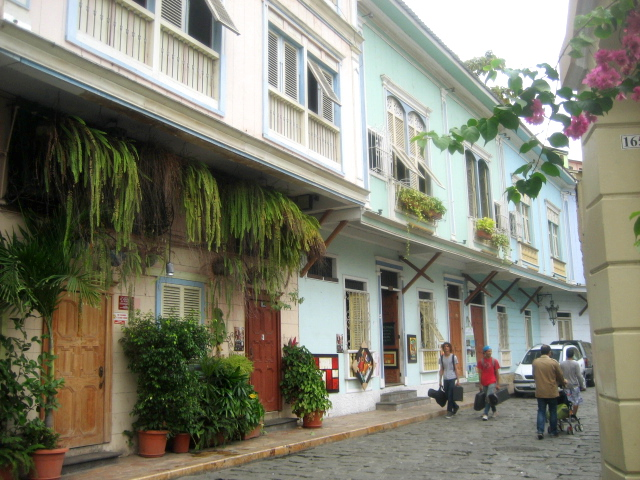
Las Peñas neighborhood

Guayaquil City Territorial Organization; Number of the sector in reference with the City Map
#	Sectors	#	Sectors	#	Sectors
1	9 de Octubre Este	25	Febres Cordero	49	Prosperina
2	9 de Octubre Oeste	26	Floresta	50	Puerto Azul Norte
3	Abel Gilbert	27	La Florida	51	Puerto Azul Sur
4	Acuarela	28	García Moreno	52	Puerto Lisa
5	Los Álamos	29	Garzota	53	Quinto Guayas Este
6	Alborada Este	30	Guangala	54	Quinto Guayas Oeste
7	Alborada Oeste	31	Guasmo Este	55	Río Guayas
8	Los Almendros	32	Guasmo Oeste	56	Roca
9	Las Américas	33	Huancavilca	57	Rocafuerte
10	Atarazana	34	Isla Trinitaria	58	La Saiba
11	Ayacucho	35	Kennedy	59	Samanes
12	Bastión Popular	36	Letamendi	60	San Eduardo
13	Batallón del Suburbio	37	Luz del Guayas	61	Los Sauces
14	Bellavista	38	Mapasingue	62	Simón Bolívar
15	Bolívar	39	Miraflores	63	Sopeña
16	Los Ceibos	40	Monte Bello	64	Sucre
17	Centenario	41	Olmedo	65	Tarqui
18	Cerro del Carmen	42	Las Orquídeas Este	66	Unión
19	Cóndor	43	Las Orquídeas Oeste	67	Urdenor
20	Cuba	44	Paraíso	68	Urdaneta
21	Del Astillero	45	Pascuales	69	Urdesa
22	Estero Salado	46	Pedro Carbo	70	Los Vergeles
23	Los Esteros	47	Las Peñas	71	Ximena
24	La FAE	48	La Pradera	72	Mirador Norte

Here you can find the list of Neighborhoods and Parishes of Guayaquil

== Demographics ==
Historical Populations Guayaquil City; Compared with Guayas Province, Canton of Guayaquil, and Guayaquil City
Census	Guayas Province	Guayaquil Canton	Guayaquil City
1950	582,144	331,942	258,966
1962	979,223	567,895	510,804
1974	1,512,333	907,013	823,219
1982	2,038,454	1,328,005	1,199,344
1990	2,515,146	1,570,396	1,508,444
2001	3,309,034	2,039,781	1,985,379
2010	3,645,483	2,350,915	2,291,158
2022	4,391,923	2,746,403	2,650,288
Source: Instituto Nacional de Estadisticas y Censos

Percentage Population Growth of Guayaquil City; Compared with Guayas Province, Canton of Guayaquil, and Guayaquil City.
Census	Guayas Province	Guayaquil Canton	Guayaquil City
1950–1962	4.34%	4.49%	5.67%
1962–1974	3.77%	4.06%	4.14%
1974–1982	3.52%	4.50%	4.44%
1982–1990	2.63%	2.10%	2.87%
1990–2001	2.49%	2.38%	2.50%
2001–2010	1.12%	1.69%	1.71%
2010–2022	1.56%	1.30%	1.22%
Source: Instituto Nacional de Estadisticas y Censos

== Food ==
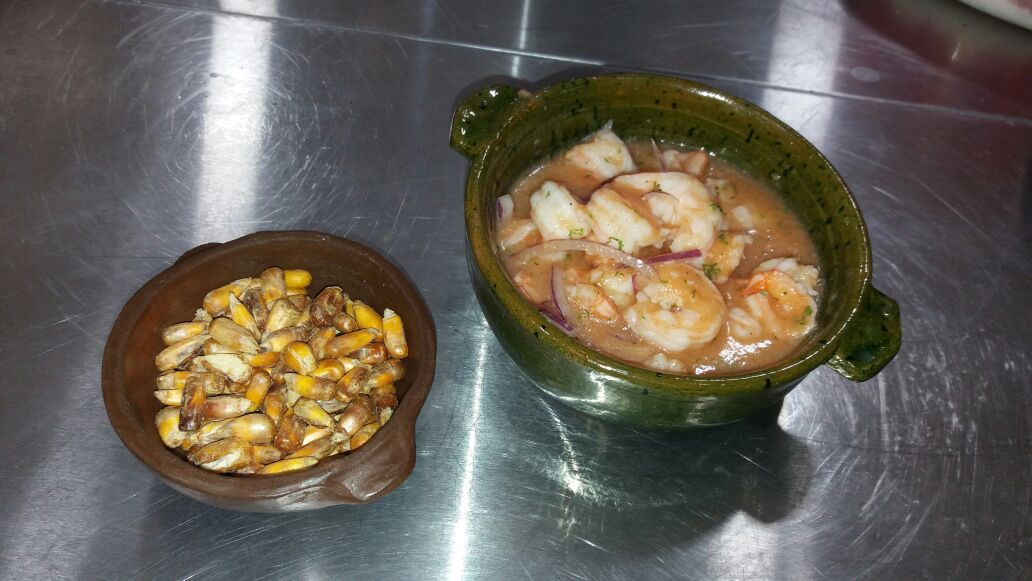
Ecuadorian ceviche, made of shrimp and lemon, onions, tomatoes and herbs. Tomato sauce, mustard and orange are used in some places, but does not form a part of the basic recipe.

Typical Guayaquil cuisine includes mostly seafood dishes such as encebollado, ceviche, cazuela, and encocado (shrimp or tuna with a coconut sauce and rice).

During breakfast, patacones and bolon (fried plantain with cheese mashed and given a rounded shape) play a big role. These plantain dishes are often accompanied with bistec de carne or encebollado de pescado.

Another prominent breakfast dish are empanadas "de viento" made with wheat flour and stretchy cheese or empanadas "de verde" plantain based with mozzarella cheese.

Pan de yuca similar to pão de queijo usually served with "yogur persa" is a typical snack in Guayaquil. With the rise in middle eastern migration, shawarma shops dot the city.

Chifa or Chinese-Ecuadorian dishes like arroz chaufa, tallarin saltado, and sopa Fui Chi Fu are common fast food options.

Some other original dishes of Guayaquil are the plantain ball soup (based on peanuts and green plantains creating a green plantain ball filled with meat and other ingredients). Bollo, analogous to hallaca, is another typical dish of this city that also the main ingredient is the green plantain and seafood. Just to mention others are the biche, sango de mariscos, and arroz con pescado frito (rice with fried fish)

Arroz con menestra y carne asada (rice with stew and roast meat), churrasco, Guatita, Caldo de mondongo, Humitas, Maduro lampriado, Maduro con queso, and Tripita are some of the dishes included in the gastronomy of the city.

== Notable people ==
=== Arts and literature ===
- Daniela Alcívar Bellolio (b. 1982, Guayaquil)
- Félix Aráuz (b. 1935, Guayaquil)
- Theo Constanté (1934–2014, Guayaquil)
- José de la Cuadra (1903, Guayaquil – d. 1941, Guayaquil)
- Alfredo Pareja Diezcanseco (1908, Guayaquil – d. 1993, Quito)
- Carmen Febres-Cordero de Ballén (b. 1829, Guayaquil – d. 1893, Valparaíso)
- Araceli Gilbert (b. 1913, Guayaquil – d. 1993, Quito)
- Enrique Gil Gilbert (1912, Guayaquil – d. 1973, Guayaquil)
- Julio Jaramillo (b. 1935, Guayaquil – d. 1978, Guayaquil)*
- Joaquín Gallegos Lara (b. 1909, Guayaquil – d. 1947, Guayaquil)
- Numa Pompilio Llona (b. 1832, Guayaquil – d. 1907, Guayaquil)
- Demetrio Aguilera Malta (b. 1909, Guayaquil – d. 1981, Mexico)
- Luis Miranda (b. 1932, Guayaquil)
- Luis Molinari (b. 1929, Guayaquil)
- Elisa Ortiz de Aulestia (b. 1909, Guayaquil – 1991)
- Xavier Blum Pinto (b. 1957, Guayaquil)
- José Martínez Queirolo (b. 1931, Guayaquil – d. 2008, Guayaquil)
- Víctor Manuel Rendón (b. 1859, Guayaquil – d. 1940, Guayaquil)
- Enrique Tábara (b. 1930, Guayaquil)
- Mercedes González Tola (b. 1860, Guayaquil – Quito, Ecuador)
- Jorge Velarde (b. 1960, Guayaquil)
- Juan Villafuerte (b. 1945, Guayaquil – d. 1977, Barcelona, Spain)
- Eugenia Viteri (b. 1928, Guayaquil)

=== Others ===
- Olga Álava, Miss Ecuador Earth 2011, Miss Earth 2011
- Noralma Vera Arrata, ballerina and choreographer
- Frederick Ashton, British choreographer and dancer
- Geovanni Camacho, football player
- María Elisa Camargo, actress
- Danilo Carrera, actor and model
- Fernanda Cornejo, fashion model and Miss International 2011
- Felipe Caicedo, footballer
- María Capovilla, supercentenarian who was once the oldest living person in the world from May 2004-August 2006
- Jorge Delgado, swimmer
- Beatriz Parra Durango, opera singer
- Jenny Estrada, writer
- Jorge Perrone Galarza, politician
- Karina Galvez, poet
- Gerardo, rapper
- Andrés Gómez, tennis player
- Catalina de Jesús Herrera, nun and writer
- Paola and Lucia Jaramillo, actresses and politicians were born here in 1990.
- Mike Judge, American animator and television writer
- Guillermo Lasso, former President of Ecuador
- Rita Lecumberri, writer
- Demetrio Aguilera Malta, writer
- Roberto Manrique, actor
- Debbie Mucarsel-Powell, American politician
- Francisco Nazareno, footballer
- Adalberto Ortiz, poet
- María Mercedes Pacheco, actor
- Albert Paulsen, actor
- Joao Plata, footballer
- Jorge Saade, violinist
- Hugo Savinovich, wrestler
- Pancho Segura, tennis player
- María del Tránsito Sorroza, midwife and formerly enslaved woman
- Jan Topić, businessman
- Benjamin Urrutia, academic
- Pedro Jorge Vera, writer
- Alex Jimbo Viteri, violinist
- Rosa Borja de Ycaza, writer
- Presley Norton Yoder, archeologist
- Roberta Zambrano, politician

== Education ==
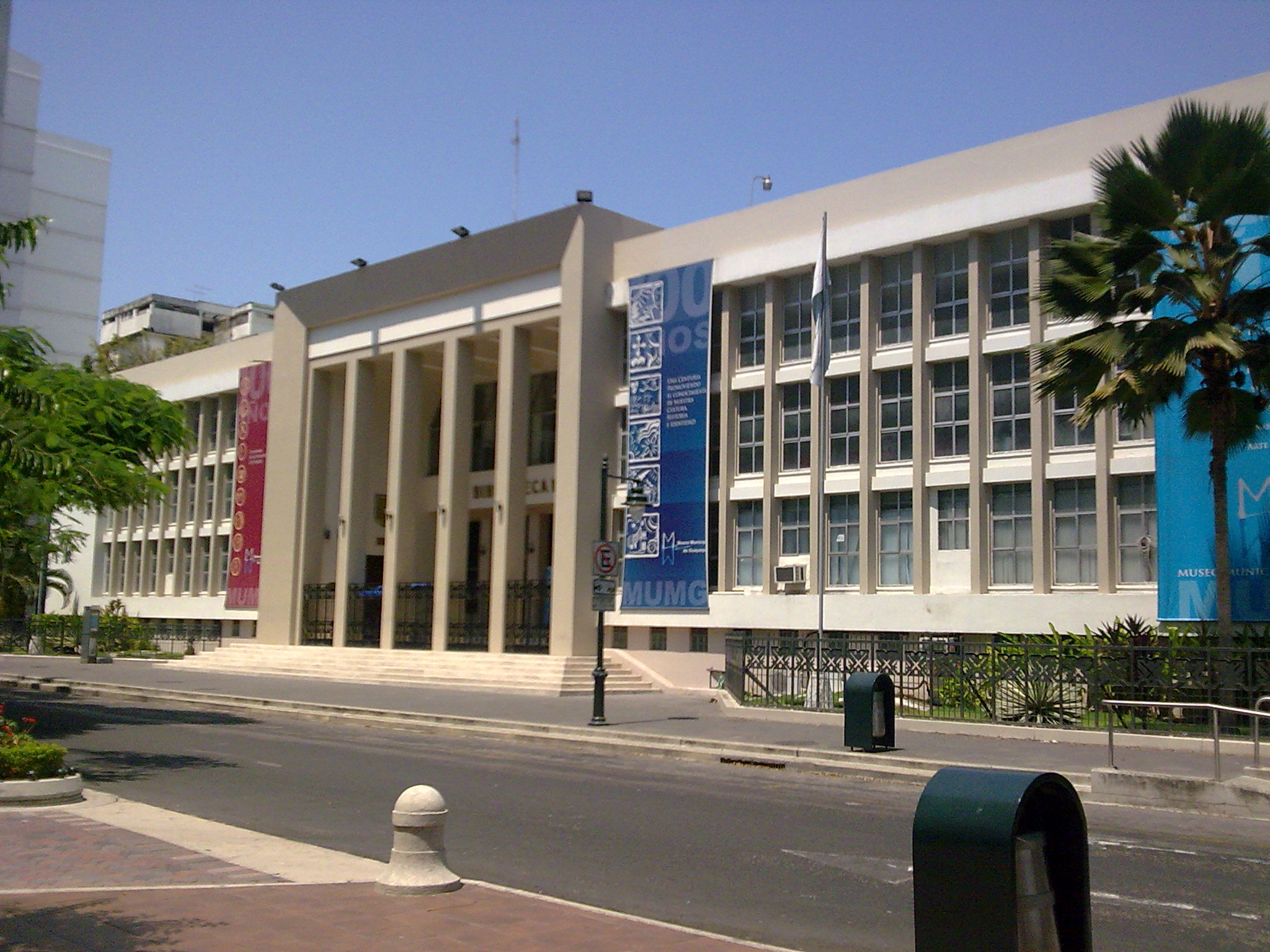
Biblioteca Municipal de Guayaquil

Biblioteca Municipal de Guayaquil (Municipal Library of Guayaquil) serves as the public library of Guayaquil. The city has several universities, including the University of Guayaquil (founded in 1867), the Universidad Catolica de Santiago de Guayaquil, the Escuela Superior Politecnica del Litoral (ESPOL), and the Universidad de Especialidades Espiritu Santo.

== Religion ==
The largest religion in Guayaquil is Christianity, with 70% of those being Catholic. In 1838 the Diocesis of Guayaquil was formed, which became the Archdiocese of Guayaquil in 1956. The city has several churches, the biggest of which being the Guayaquil Metropolitan Cathedral.

Aside from catholicism, the city has churches from other denominations, such as the Guayaquil Ecuador Temple of the Church of Jesus Christ of Latter-day Saints and the Templo de La Fé from the Universal Church of the Kingdom of God. The city also has Jewish and Islamic communities.

Guayaquil is also home to the Yuan Heng temple, the biggest Buddhist temple in South America.

== Sports ==
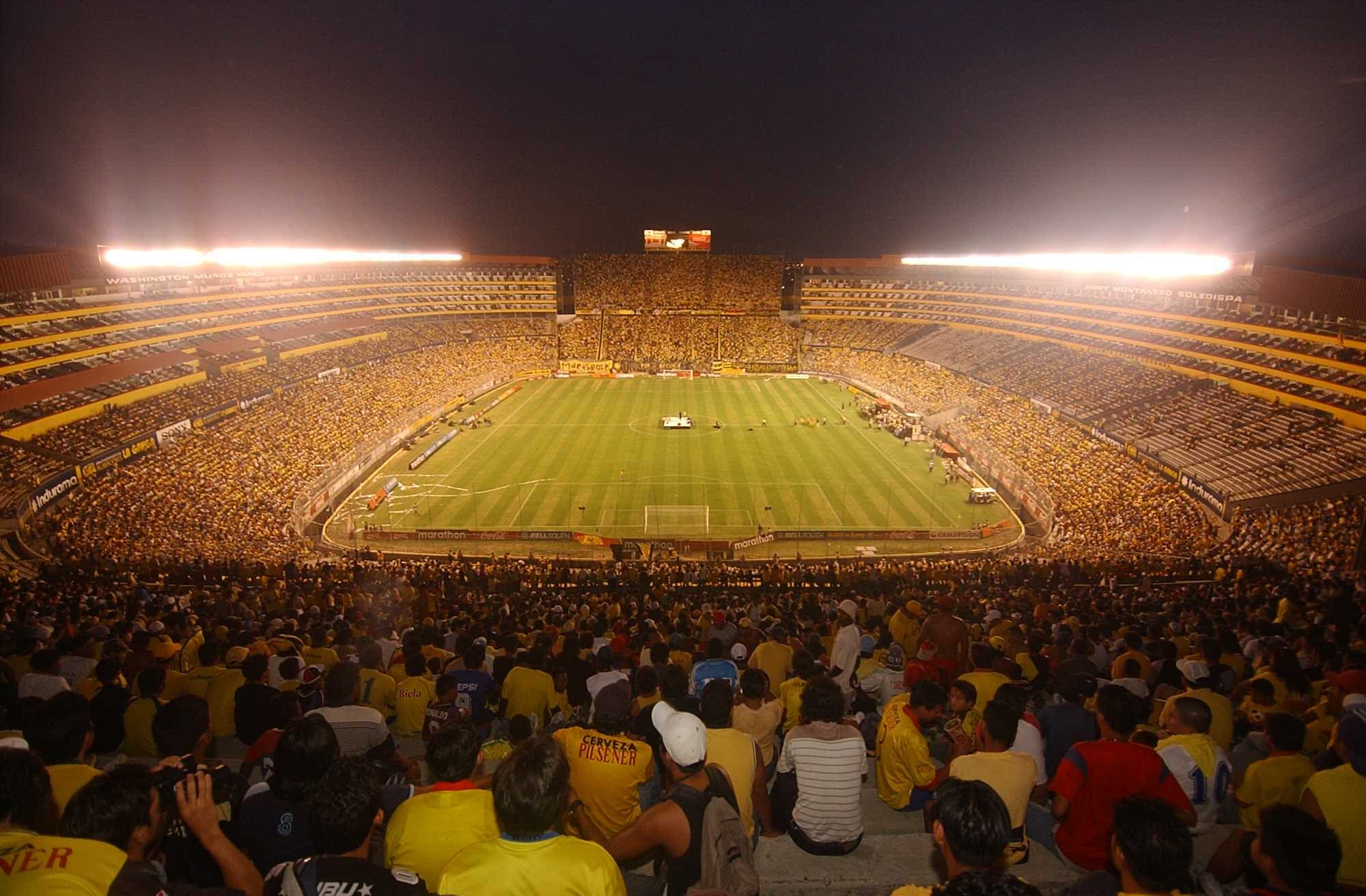
Barcelona's Stadium Monumental, the 12th largest stadium in South America.

There are two major association football clubs; the Barcelona Sporting Club and the Club Sport Emelec. Each club has its own stadium; the Estadio Monumental Banco Pichincha is the home of the "Barcelonistas" while the Estadio George Capwell is the home of the "Emelecistas". These two teams have a long history of rivalry in Guayaquil and when these two teams play against each other the game is called "El Clásico del Astillero".

The city is the birthplace of Francisco Segura Cano; and Andrés Gómez and Nicolás Lapentti, Ecuador's two most successful tennis players, now both retired. The "Abierto de Tenis Ciudad de Guayaquil" is a tennis tournament organised in Guayaquil by Gómez and Luis Morejon, and held annually in November.

Another major event in the city is the Guayaquil Marathon, which has been held every year on the first weekend of October since 2005. These race is certified by the (AIMS) Association of International Marathons and Distance Races.

The sports & Ecological Park called Parque Samanes de Guayaquil is a park with courts for soccer, tennis, volleyball, and basketball, two lakes, a soccer stadium and an amphi theatre for open air concerts and events. It is connected to a forest reserve with trails for cycling and walking, as well as installations for climbing and zip-lining.

== Universities ==
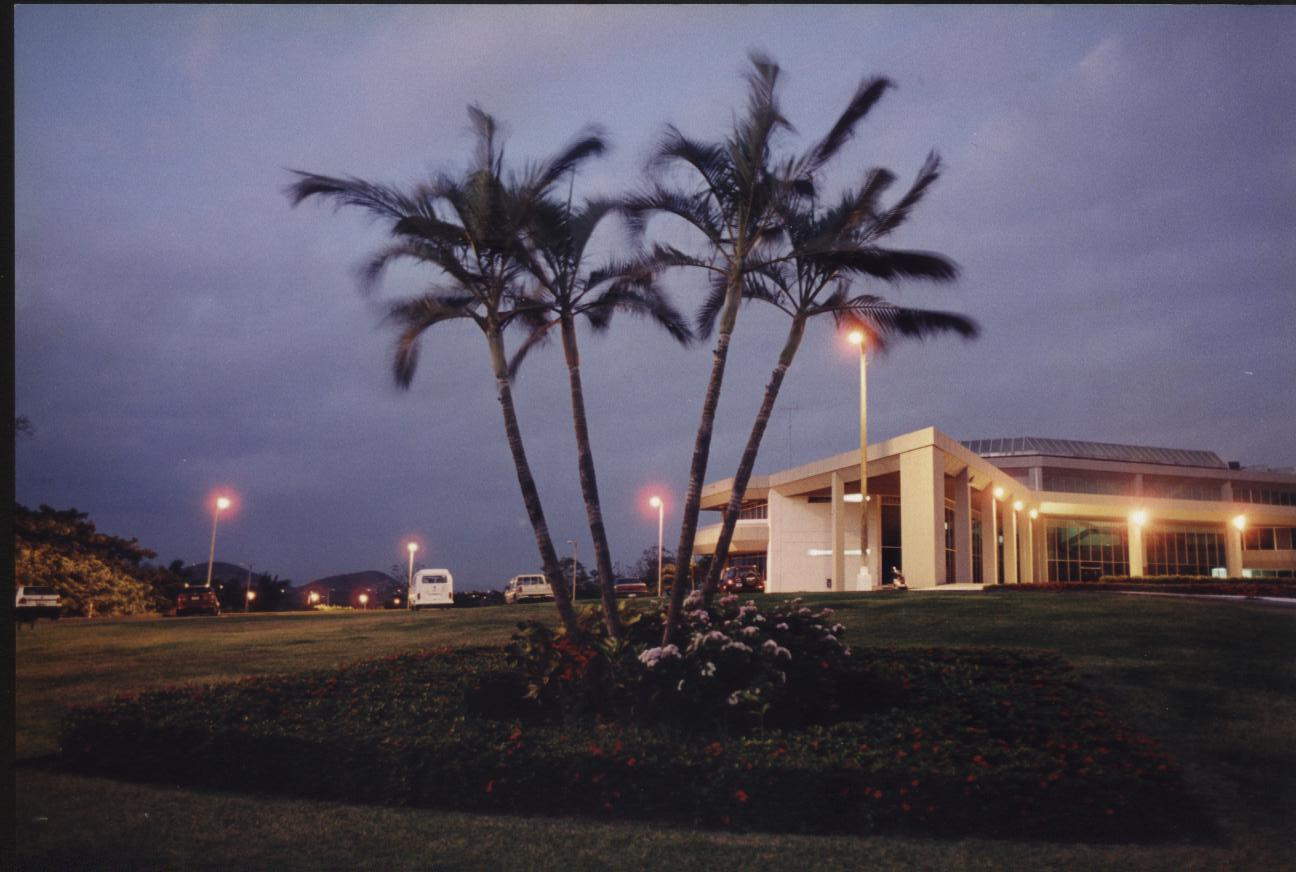
ESPOL offices at night

Some of Guayaquil's main universities are:

- Escuela Superior Politécnica del Litoral
- Universidad de Especialidades Espíritu Santo
- University of Guayaquil
- Universidad Católica de Santiago de Guayaquil
- Universidad Laica Vicente Rocafuerte
- Universidad Casa Grande
- Universidad Tecnológica Ecotec
- Universidad Santa María
- Blue Hill College
- Universidad Del Pacífico – Ecuador
- Institute of Graphics Arts and Digital Science
- Universidad Politécnica Salesiana

== Transport ==
Guayaquil is located along national Highway 40 and is near Highway 25.

Among Guayaquil's major trading points are the seaport, the largest in Ecuador and one of the biggest handlers of shipping on the shores of the Pacific; and José Joaquín de Olmedo International Airport.

José Joaquín de Olmedo International Airport, though using the same runways, had its passenger terminal completely rebuilt in 2006 and was renamed. The old passenger terminal is now a convention centre.

Guayaquil is served by a bus rapid transit system, Metrovia, which opened in 2006. The system has three lines and is supplemented by 35 feeder routes, carrying a total of 400,000 daily passengers.

The Empresa de Ferrocarriles Ecuatorianos offers tourist rail service to Quito from the neighboring city of Durán, Ecuador, located across the Guayas River from Guayaquil.

=== Port of Guayaquil ===
The Port of Guayaquil is one of the most important ports in Ecuador and a major port in South America. The port handles large amounts of cargo and is also a hub for transshipment to other countries in the Pacific region.

Since the dissolution of FARC and its drug trafficking business in Colombia, the port of Guayaquil has become one of the most important locations in the drug trade in Latin America. Ecuadorian gangs like Los Choneros and Los Lobos commonly receive cocaine sold by groups in Colombia and are tasked with successfully distributing it to cartels in Mexico. Cities that serve as gateways to Guayaquil like Durán have seen sharply increased violence because of this.

Responsible for port operation is the state Guayaquil Port Authority.

== Twin towns – sister cities ==
Guayaquil is twinned with:

- Houston, United States (1987)
- Santiago, Chile (2004)
- Shanghai, China (2001)

== See also ==
- Casa del Hombre Doliente – care facility for those suffering a terminal illness
- Newspapers of Guayaquil
- Aerovia (Guayaquil)
- LGBTQIA+ in Guayaquil
