= María Mercedes Pacheco =

Ecuadorian actress (born 1976)

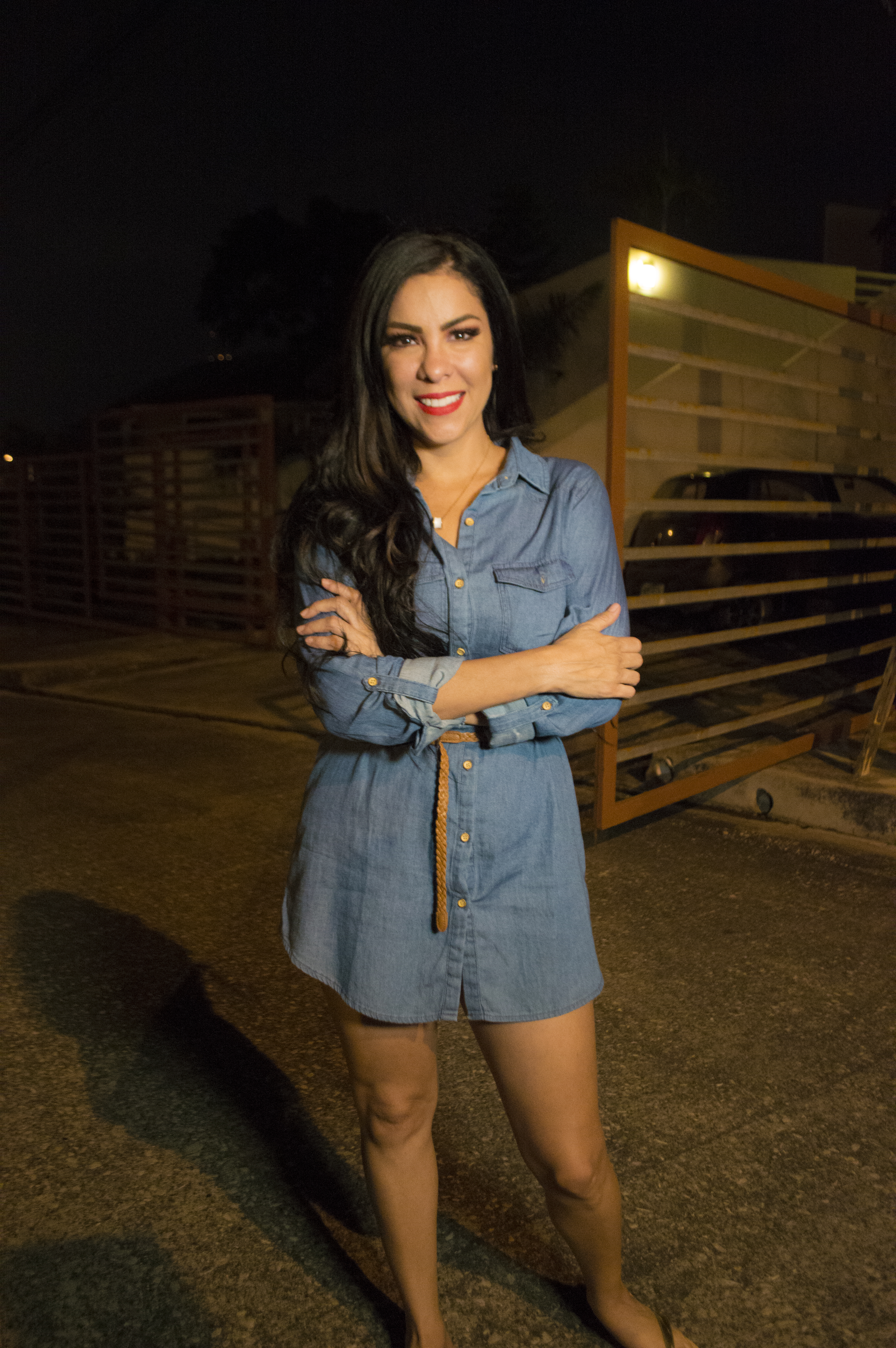
- Pacheco in 2017
- Born: 15 September 1976 (age 49); Guayaquil, Ecuador
- Occupations: Actress, television presenter

María Mercedes Pacheco (born 15 September 1976) is an Ecuadorian actress known for her portrayals of various television characters, as well as her work as a presenter for some TV programs. Pacheco is also known for playing 'Estrellita Vespertina' in the comedy series El Combo Amarillo on Ecuavisa.

== Career ==
Pacheco's first steps on television occurred at the end of the 1990s in the sketch comedy program Ni en Vivo Ni en Directo, in which she participated with Fernando Villarroel, Sofía Caiche, Vicente Romero, José Northia and Álex Plúas. She was also part of TC Televisión productions such as Mi Recinto, Joselito, and participated in the telenovela Sharon la Hechicera on Ecuavisa. She was also the host of the show business program Vamos Con Todo on RTS.

== Personal life ==
Passionate about acting, this was what allowed her to reach the big screen. Pacheco commented that she is not fond of her love life being disseminated in show business. Even so, she agreed to discuss her single status in the RTS program, in which in June 2019, she confirmed her single status. One of the most controversial moments was when the actress resigned her role in the RTS program Vamos con Todo. According to Pacheco, the reasons for this event were that after a year and a half of her participation in the channel, the company was unable to comply with her requests.

== Filmography ==
=== Television ===
Year	Title	Role
2018-2019	Sharon la Hechicera	Esperanza Cisneros de Bermeo
2017	Lo que está pa' ti	Juliana, madre de Ámar y Cangrejo
2017	La Trinity	Dolores Mogollón de Suárez #2
2011-2016	El Combo Amarillo	Estrellita Vespertina Loor de Martínez
2011	La panadería	Various characters
2010	La taxista	Estrellita Vespertina Loor de Martínez
2004	Jocelito	Marisela Vasconcellos
2001-2006	Mi recinto	Comadre Vaca Loca
1999-2006	Ni en Vivo Ni en Directo	Varios Personajes de Parodias

=== Programs ===
Year	Programs	Role
2015-2017	Vamos con Todo	Presenter
2012-2013	Así somos	Presenter
