= Newspapers of Guayaquil =

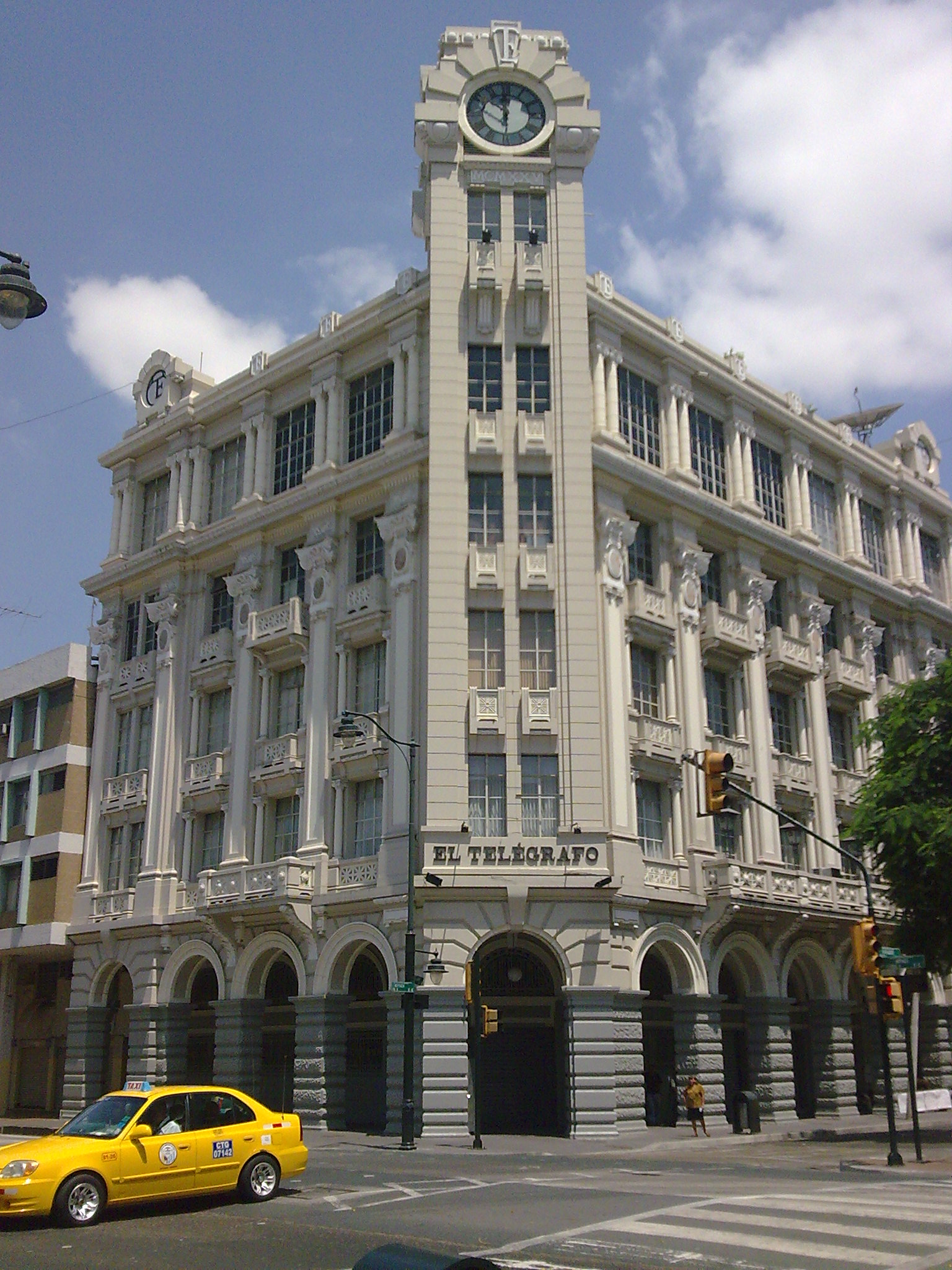
Diario El Telégrafo building

This is a list of all the publications printed in Guayaquil which report both national and international news.

- Diario Expreso de Guayaquil
- Comunidad En Guayaquil
- Del Diario Extra
- Diario El Meridiano
- Diario El Metro de Guayaquil
- Diario Super
- Diario El Telegrafo
- El Financiero
- La Segunda del Meridiano
- El Universo
