= Xavier Blum Pinto =

Ecuadorian artist (born 1957)

- Born: 1957 (age 68–69); Guayaquil, Ecuador
- Education: Universidad Católica de Santiago de Guayaquil; Université Paris VIII
- Known for: Contemporary art, installations, performance art
- Movement: Contemporary art

Xavier Blum Pinto (born 1957 in Guayaquil) is an Ecuadorian artist. From 1974 to 1976 he studied architecture at the Universidad Catolica Santiago de Guayaquil, in Ecuador. In 1981, obtained his MA in Fine Arts from the Universitė of Paris VIII, France.

In 1996 he participated in the São Paulo Art Biennial.

In 2011, he was one of the judges that judged the 55 works in the XI Bienal Internacional de Cuenca and announced the results at its opening.

Blum was responsible for the concept and curation of the Muestra de Arte Erótico Espiritual Contemporáneo, a group show that opened in August 2011 at Espacio Vacío in Guayaquil and continued at the regional office of Ecuador’s National Institute of Cultural Heritage (INPC) in Las Peñas. El Telégrafo is a national daily.

== Individual exhibitions ==
- 1988 Museum of Art of the Central bank, Guayaquil, Ecuador;
- 1981 Municipal museum of Santiago de Guayaquil, Ecuador.

== Group exhibitions ==
- 1995 Punta Blanca 95, White End, Ecuador; Images and Textures, Museum Central bank, Guayaquil, Ecuador.
- 1994 Salón de Julio, Municipal Museum, Guayaquil, Ecuador;
- 1994 The daily thing of the Art, Municipal Museum, Guayaquil, Ecuador;
- 1989 Museum Nahim Isaģas, Guayaquil, Ecuador;
- 1988 Museum of Contemporary Hispanic Arts MOCHA, New York City, United States;
- 1987 Hall Julio, Museum of the Central bank, Guayaquil, Ecuador;
- 1986 Prė-Biennial Nacional de Pintura, Museum of Modern Art, Cuenca, Ecuador;
