= Casa del Hombre Doliente =

Foundation in Guayaquil, Ecuador

La casa del hombre doliente is a foundation located in Guayaquil, Ecuador, dedicated to caring for indigent people who are in the final stage of terminal illnesses. Casa del Hombre Doliente maintains the foundation with donations and volunteer efforts, doing activities to get more funds, for example, "El clasico de la solidaridad" which is a famous event in Guayaquil. The foundation now is under the management of Monsignor Juan I. Larrea Holguín and Margarita Arosemena Gómez-Lince.

== History ==
The committee to construct "La casa del hombre doliente" was formed on July 18, 1988, by a group led by S.E. Cardinal Bernardino Echeverría Ruiz and S.E. Monsignor Juan Ignacio Larrea Holguín. In April 1993, "La casa del hombre doliente" officially opened their doors at Samanes 7 to the most needy people of Guayaquil, offering them a chance to fight their illnesses and have a better quality of life. The foundation is now one of the most recognized foundations in the city.

== Mission ==
The mission of the foundation is to convert this center in a place which the extremely sick and poor people have place where they could be treated with dignity and to make this people life a little better in every sense they can and hoping that this place become for this people the waiting room for heaven.

=== Labor ===
They focus in taking care of indigent patients who are facing terminal diseases such as cancer, diabetes, muscular dystrophy, heart ailments, and HIV. The patients are distributed according to their pathology with around the clock attention and they receive:

- Lodging
- Medicines
- Meals
- Transfer to hospitals to see specialists or to use sophisticated equipment if necessary
- Laboratory exams
- Orientation and psychological aid for friends and family.
