= Dolores Sucre =

Ecuadorian poet

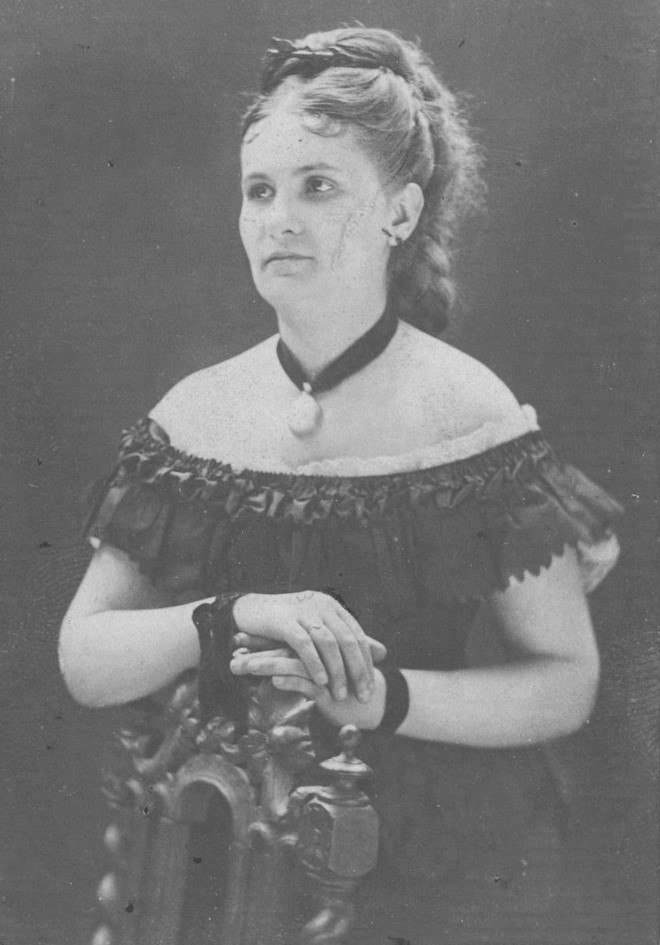
Dolores Sucre y Lavayén in 1870

Dolores Sucre y Lavayen was an Ecuadorian poet and descendant of Antonio José de Sucre. She was on a stamp in her home country.
