= Rita Lecumberri =

Ecuadorian writer and educator

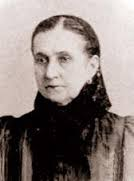
Rita Lecumberri

Rita Lecumberri Robles (1836–1910) was an Ecuadorian writer and educator. She was a published and awarded poet and essayist. She is also noted for her contribution to the education of women in Ecuador. She was director of the Escuela San Alejo in 1880–1882 and 1882–1895. A school (El colegio Rita Lecumberri) is named after her, as well as an award. She was born in Guayaquil, and is also buried there.

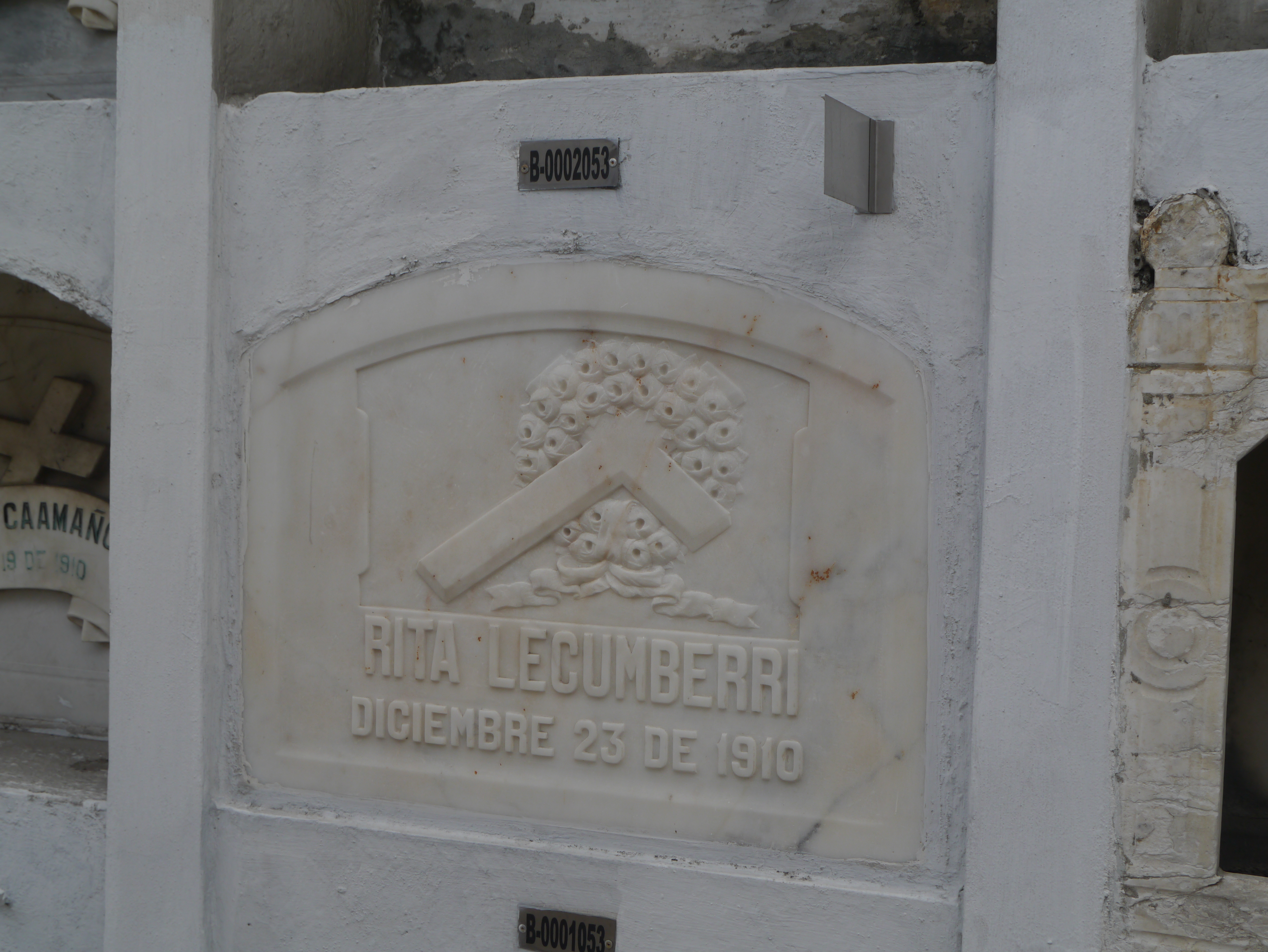
Tomb of Rita Lecumberri
