= Malecón Simón Bolívar =

Boardwalk in Guayaquil, Ecuador

Coordinates: 2.194061°S 79.879874°W

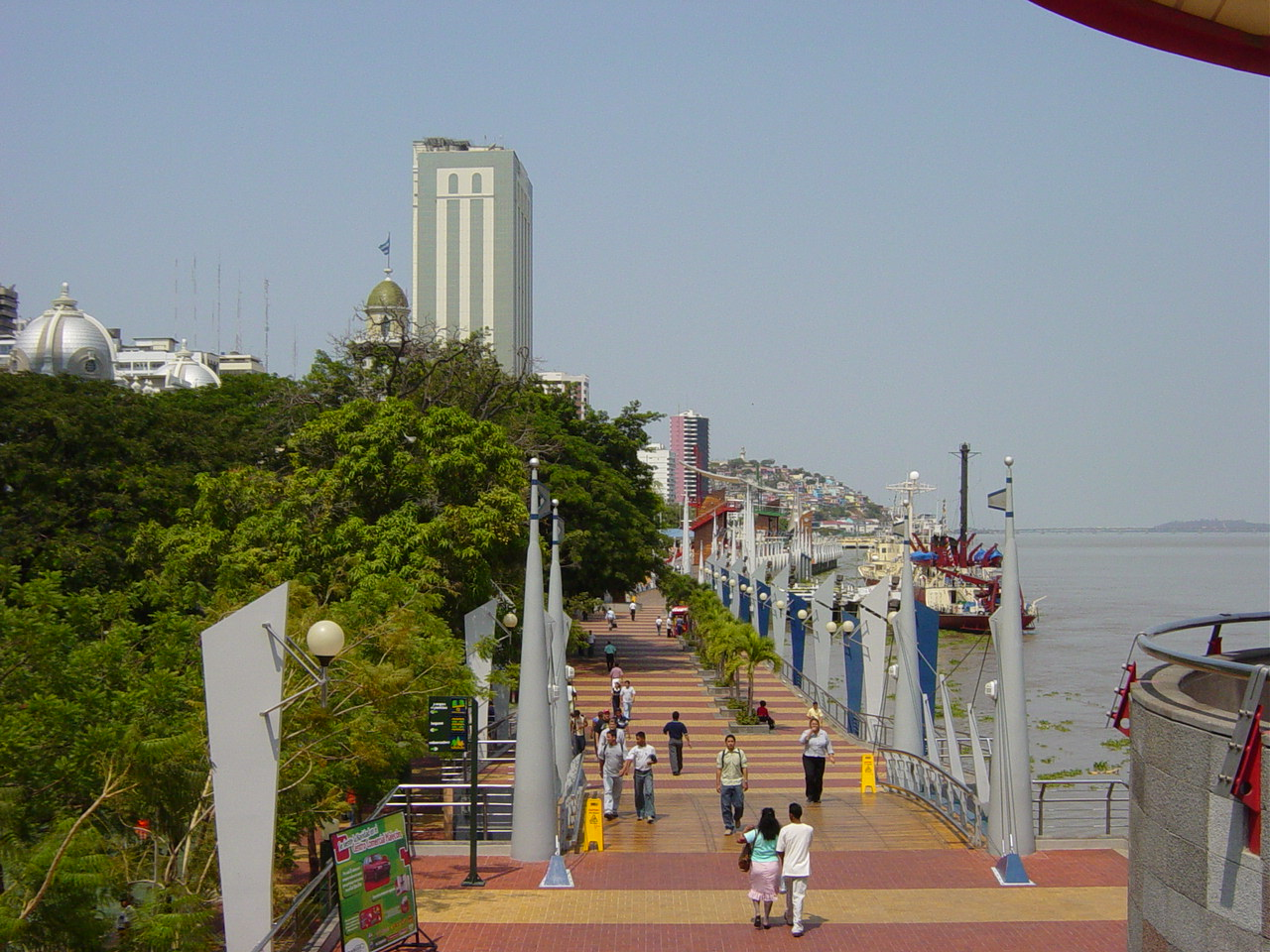
The Malecón Simón Bolívar in 2004

Malecón Simón Bolívar (also known as the Malecón 2000) is the name given to the boardwalk overlooking the Guayas River in the Ecuadorian port city of Guayaquil. An urban renewal project focusing on the old Simón Bolívar boardwalk, it stands along the west shore of the river for an approximate length of 2.5 km. (1.5 mi.) Several of the greatest historical monuments in the history of Guayaquil can be seen along its length, as well as museums, gardens, fountains, shopping malls, restaurants, bars, food courts, and the first IMAX theater in South America, as well as boarding docks where several embarkations offer both daytime and nighttime tours up and down the Guayas River. It is one of the largest urban development projects in Guayaquil and is considered a model of urban regeneration by global standards, having been declared a healthy public space by the Pan-American Organization of Health (POH) and the World Health Organization (WHO).

== History ==
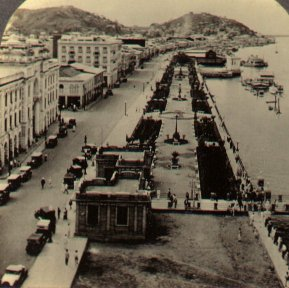
Guayaquil's waterfront around 1920

During the colonial period, the Malecón was a narrow path in roadway form. During the 19th century, it gradually expanded and extended as years went by and became a focal point of early social life in the young city..

Over several decades, the boardwalk fell into disrepair with several areas of it eventually falling into the river itself by the mid-to-late 1980s. By this time it was also regarded as a very unsafe place, as many thieves, muggers and cutpurses took advantage of the cover provided by overgrown foliage and poor illumination to hide and wait for possible victims. Drug dealers and prostitutes also used to frequent the area at night during its most dangerous period.

== Present ==
Initiated during the administration of Mayor León Febres-Cordero, ex-president of the Republic of Ecuador, and finalized during the second term of his successor, Jaime Nebot Saadi, it held as one of its goals the re-valuation of the commercial areas of the city creating spaces that would encourage urban renewal. At 5 million visitors since its first stage inauguration in October 1999, it is one of the most visited spots in the city.

It contains a mall, a museum, restaurants, exhibition galleries, lagoons, and paths.

The Malecón 2000 Foundation, a private non-profit entity, administers the boardwalk. This foundation is comprised by the most representative public and private entities in the city.

== Locations ==
=== Sections ===
Malecón Simón Bolívar is divided into several sections:

- The north section, which has several plazas, water fountains, an antique Ecuadorian train, spaces for aerobics and games for children, a planetarium, an anthropological museum, a contemporary art museum, and an IMAX theater
- The central area, home to the historic Civic Plaza and sculptures: the Moorish Clock Tower, and the Rotonda Monument. The Guayaquil Yacht Club and the Naval Yacht club are also located here.
- The southern area, home to the modern Bahía Malecón Shopping Center.

=== Monuments ===
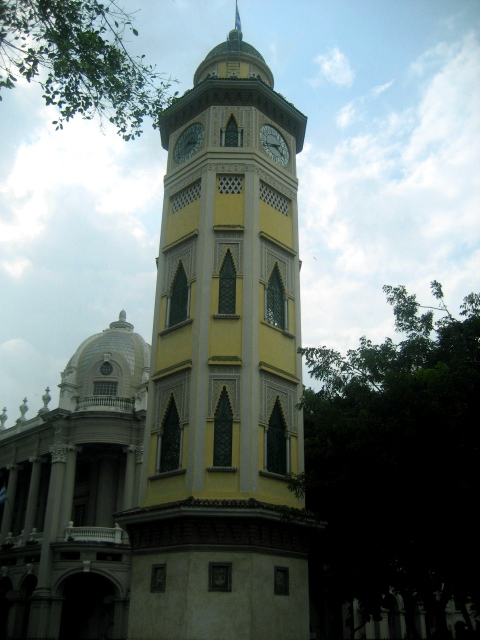
Moorish Tower

Monuments on the Malecón include:

- The José Joaquín de Olmedo bust, poet and first mayor of Guayaquil.
- Moorish Tower or Public Clock, the clock was bought in England by Don Manuel Antonio Lizárraga, a rich Spanish merchant, an illustrious figure of the Independence, it was inaugurated in October 1842. The tower was built to house a clock that was originally imported from England in the 1840s.
- La Rotonda, on 9 de Octubre Avenue, a monument to the encounter between the liberators José de San Martín from Argentina and Simón Bolívar from Venezuela in 1822. They fought against the Spanish people for freedom from their oppression.
- The Carlos Alberto Arroyo del Río monument, commemorating the Ecuadorian president who was born in Guayaquil.

=== Recreational areas ===
- Wagon Square: The Wagon Square is home to an Ecuadorian railroad and railroad sculptures adapted as a space for exhibitions.
- Orellana Square: Located in front of Orellana street gate, this is the northern end of this sector which serves as a connection with the Malecón Gardens.
- Mercado Sur: A glass estate where several events take place for the city's celebrations.

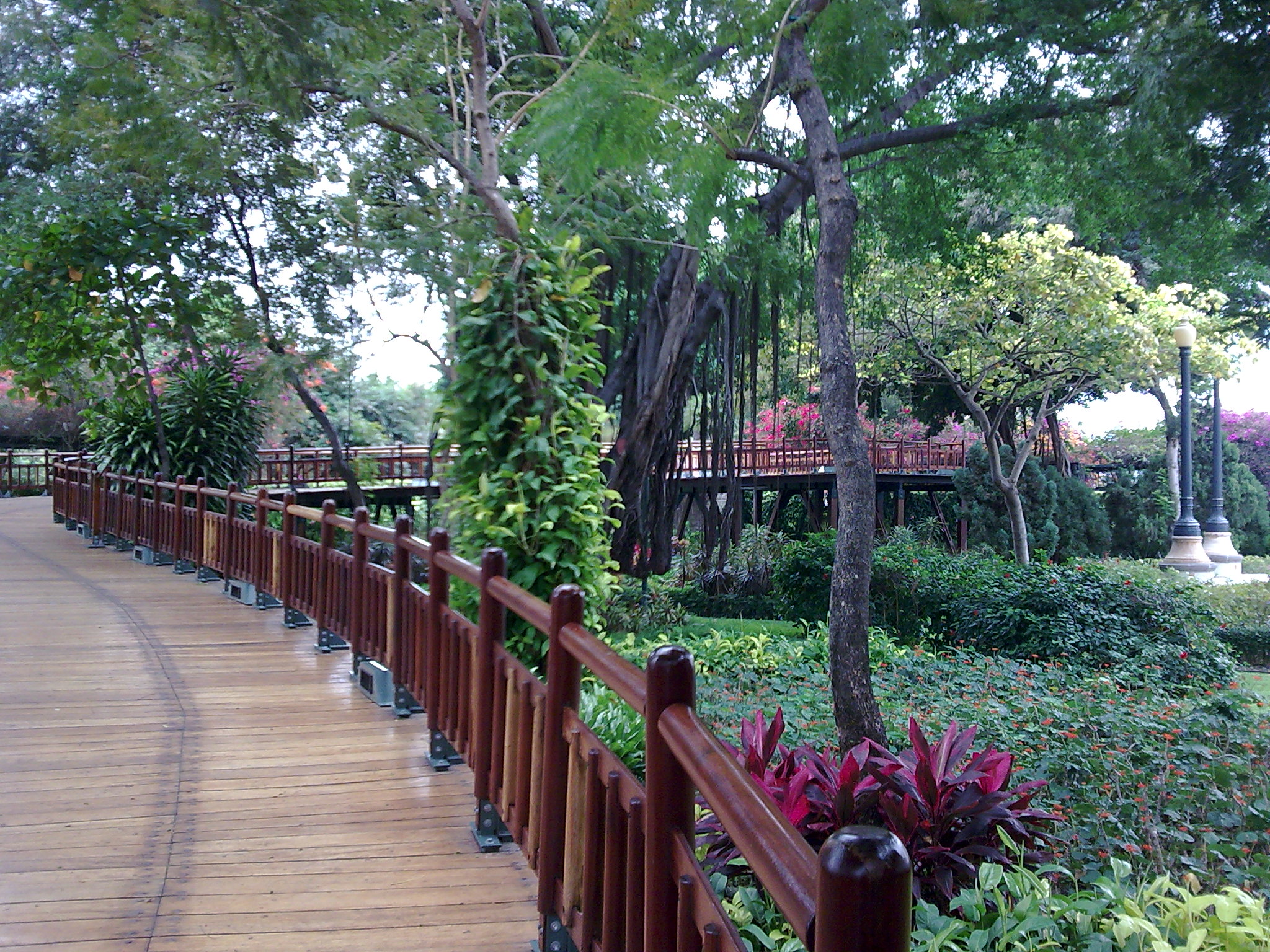
Malecón Gardens.

=== Gardens ===
The Malecón Gardens are parks of approximately 22,000 m^{2}. of extension, where visitors can enjoy different botanic species of Ecuador. It also has an artificial stream on Orellana Street and a pond that spreads between Tomás Martinez and Loja Streets.

=== Museo Antropológico ===
The Malecon has a Museum of Anthropology (Museo Antropológico) that offers expositions of local artists as well as international ones.
