= List of Ecuadorian painters =

Notable Ecuadorian painters include:

- Alfredo Palacio Moreno (1912-1998)
- Aníbal Villacís (1927–2012)
- Araceli Gilbert (1913-1993)
- Bolívar Mena Franco (1913–1993)
- Brenda Gonzalez
- Caesar Andrade Faini (1913–?)
- Camilo Egas (1889-1962)
- Edgar Carrasco Arteaga (1946–present)
- Eduardo Kingman (1913-1998)
- Eduardo X Arroyo (1953–present)
- Enrique Tábara (1930–present)
- Estuardo Maldonado (1930–present)
- Félix Aráuz (1935–2024)
- Galo Galecio
- Gilberto Almeida
- Gonzalo Endara Crow (1936-1996)
- Humberto Moré (1929-1984)
- Jaime F. Bautista (1955-present)
- Jaime Valencia (1915–present)
- Jorge Velarde (1960–present)
- Jose Carreño (1947–present)
- Jovan Karlo Villalba (1977–present)
- Juan Villafuerte (1945-1977)
- Judith Gutierrez (1927-2003)
- Luis Miranda (1932-2016)
- Luis Molinari-Flores (1929–present)
- Manuel Rendón (1894-1982)
- Marcos Restrepo (1961–present)
- Miguel Betancourt (1958–present)
- Oswaldo Guayasamín (1919-1999)
- Oswaldo Moncayo (1923-1984)
- Oswaldo Moreno (1929-2011)
- Oswaldo Viteri (1931–present)
- Patricio Cueva Jaramillo (1928–present)
- Rafael Salas (1824-1906)
- Theo Constanté (1934–present)
- Trude Sojka (1909-2007)
- Víctor Mideros Almeida (1888-1967)
- Washington Iza (1947–present)
- Xavier Blum Pinto (1957–present)
