= Miguel Betancourt =

Ecuadorian contemporary artist

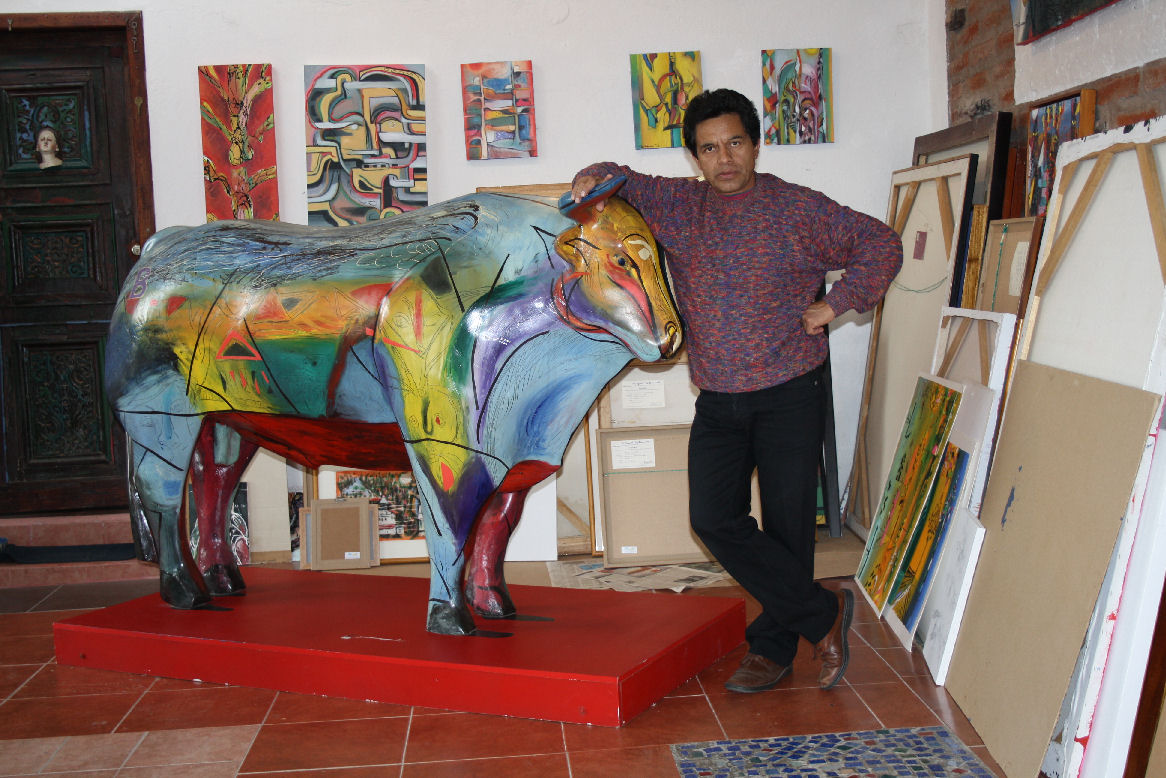
- Miguel Betancourt
- Born: 5 January 1958 (age 68); Quito, Ecuador
- Education: Milwaukee Art Center, Slade School of Fine Art University College London, Pontificia Universidad Católica del Ecuador
- Known for: Contemporary art
- Website: www.miguelbetancourt.com

Signature
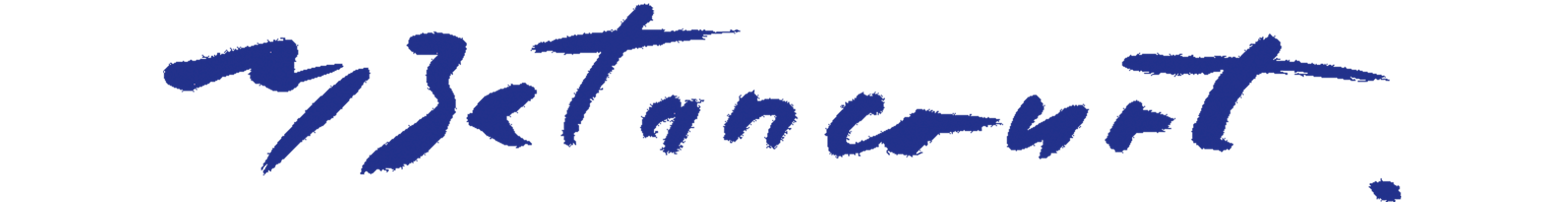

Miguel Betancourt (born 5 January 1958) is an Ecuadorian contemporary artist living in Quito, Ecuador. He was formed as an artist in Ecuador, the United States, and the United Kingdom. His paintings are a fusion of local cultural motives and colors, and Western artistic influence.

== Life and early years ==
Born in Quito, Ecuador in 1958, Betancourt grew up in the outskirts of the city (Cumbayá), a rural parish of Quito, into a family connected to agriculture. This background fostered his interest in plants and nature, which would become recurring elements in his artwork.

In 1974, he initiated art classes with Ecuadorian artist, Oswaldo Moreno, who significantly influenced his development. Betancourt reflected on this period, stating:

"Every trip to the countryside was a lesson in approaching the canvas. With Oswaldo, I learned the value of cleanliness and freshness in technique."

In 1976–1977, he went to study at the Milwaukee Art Center, United States, for a year, an experience that motivated him to formalize his artistic studies. Upon his return to Ecuador, he enrolled in the Pontificia Universidad Católica del Ecuador to study Pedagogy and Literature until 1982, while continuing to develop his artistic career. In 1988, he was invited by the Department of State of the US to a Cultural Tour. In the same year, the British Council awarded him a scholarship to study a postgraduate art degree at the Slade School of Fine Art at the University College London (1988–1989). These international experiences shaped his approach to movements such as analytical cubism, surrealism, and New Figuration. During his time in London, Betancourt befriended British artist John Hoyland, who contributed to his understanding of abstract expressionism.

== Style ==
Miguel Betancourt's pictorial art is characterized by a figurative representation articulated through the aesthetic principle of the organic and vegetal, expressed via the compositional concept of the phytomorphic.

Natural elements, such as trunks, roots, and leaves, hold a central place in Betancourt's work. These forms are drawn or accumulated in vibrant compositions projected onto backgrounds featuring parallel structures or balanced zones. Since the beginning of his career, nature references have been essential to his artistic identity, almost as if they form part of what could be described as a "vegetal memory." Critic Xavier Michelena described this connection in the context of the exhibition Memoria Vegetal (1996):

"The canvases and cardboards of his latest exhibition, Memoria Vegetal, filled every corner of his crowded studio, blending with his most beloved flowers and plants, silent remnants of the magical territory of his childhood."

On this relationship with the vegetal, Betancourt has stated:

"The vegetal is a sign I discovered very early on, and I have developed it consistently. At first, it was fortuitous, and later reflection contributed its part."

Over four decades of continuous work, various recurring themes can be identified in Betancourt's oeuvre, including the sacred, the urban, the colonial, the calligraphic, the ancestral, and a constant exploration of shrub-like, vegetal, arboreal, and floral elements. These themes are encapsulated in the anthological exhibition Según la dirección del viento [According to the Direction of the Wind] (2023).

Regarding his use of color, Betancourt grounds his palette in the chromatic spectra found in nature and in ancestral textiles of pre-Columbian origin. His selection is oriented toward the use of direct tones from which harmonic correspondences emerge, whether through assimilation or contrast. For Betancourt, color is not only a technical resource but also a medium imbued with symbolism related to the themes he addresses.

=== The sacred ===
The concept of the sacred in Miguel Betancourt's work is expressed through the depiction of certain spaces of worship, such as churches and temples, and their architectural details, primarily those of Gothic or colonial style. These settings, often associated with figurative rituals, are linked to the compositional format of stained glass under the principle of translucent color. This approach demands special attention to light and transparency, leading Betancourt to employ various techniques and materials suited to capturing the luminosity of these spaces. His interest in Gothic stained glass and transfigured light has been a central element in his work, with watercolor being a particularly suitable technique for rendering these effects.

=== The urban ===
The reference to the urban in Miguel Betancourt's work is not limited to the descriptive representation of cityscapes but also serves as a testimony of his experience, particularly in Quito's colonial center. In his works, neighborhoods are portrayed through both the verticality of buildings and the horizontality of the city. Betancourt creates forms that function as pictographic metagoges, through which it might seem that doors speak, walls listen, or streets glide as if traversing themselves. For the artist, the urban becomes a metaphor for the human condition.

His approach to vernacular architecture often reflects a melancholy associated with the character of Andean towns. Adobe houses and the colonial city with its churches are recurrently depicted in his works.

=== The calligraphic ===
In Betancourt's work, the calligraphic is significant as a principle of figuration and composition. In this regard, the influence of oriental models is fundamental for the artist, who also employs a variety of papers made from natural fibers, such as rice or bamboo. Additionally, he uses raw materials like jute to impart an unformed quality to his compositions. As Betancourt himself states:

"The bold and free strokes prioritize the material’s surface over the observer’s eye."

=== The ancestral ===
The concept of the ancestral is a significant source of inspiration in Miguel Betancourt's work, where figurations from Ecuador's ancient cultures, such as Valdivia, Bahía de Caráquez, and Guangala, occupy a central place. Pre-Columbian cultures from Peru, such as Paracas and Nazca, are also represented in his art. Betancourt not only depicts pre-Columbian settings but also integrates them into works that propose multiple narratives and diverse compositional schemes. In many of these pieces, the artist introduces syncretic architectural elements, such as semicircular arches characteristic of Western Gothic styles, which stand as intimate spaces for religious reproduction. This syncretism is articulated as a state of coexistence and ancestral evolution.

==== Cosmogonías de un pintor (Cosmogonies of a Painter) ====
Art Series, 2023

The ancestral Indo-American heritage, primarily rooted in the Andean and equinoctial regions of pre-Columbian times, has been a significant source of creative inspiration for Miguel Betancourt throughout his artistic career.

This influence is particularly evident in Cosmogonías de un pintor, a thematic-anthological exhibition showcasing a curated selection of works inspired by pre-Hispanic creative paradigms. The collection spans over two decades, including both early and recent pieces that adhere to this aesthetic model, while also reflecting the stylistic evolution of the artist's current creative vision.

Each work selected for this exhibition encapsulates various figurative elements and, in some cases, mythological narratives derived from ancestral worldviews. These compositions bring to life symbolic elements that reflect contexts of indigenous cosmology. Together they form the cosmogonies of a painter, embodied in mythographic compositions that draw deeply from pre-Columbian inspiration.

=== The symbolic ===
[[File:|alt=|thumb|250x250px|La diva. 2011. [Portrait of Elizabeth Taylor]]] The symbol is a recurring element in Miguel Betancourt's work. Through both local and universal themes, the artist employs figures that evoke the mystical and the metaphysical. His symbolism is characterized by cut-out faces, winged figures, and beings with typologies reminiscent of a medieval bestiary. These representations are connected to pre-Columbian, European, and religious influences; beings that coexist in these spatiotemporal realms.

A prominent example of this tendency is the figure of the Virgin of Legarda, the patroness of Quito, which frequently appears in his works, inspired by the statue atop the El Panecillo hill. Additionally, Betancourt has reinterpreted iconic works of world art in his own style. Notable among these is the series Nymphs, Maids of Honor, and the Painter's Gaze, where the artist uses Diego Velázquez's Las Meninas as a foundation for a series of compositional variations on paper and canvas. The original painting serves as a central motif from which Betancourt unfolds a personal interpretation through his artistic language.

Betancourt himself has commented on the mirror included in Velázquez's work:

"The mirror, which in the original painting is the mechanism through which we see the kings, now becomes the entity that distorts lines, duplicates objects, and retains images and landscapes that have been constitutive elements of my artistic syntax."

The series incorporates techniques such as collage, action painting, calligraphy, figurative art, and the use of watercolors. Betancourt also employs a variety of materials, including hemp, oil on canvas, and various types of oriental papers.

The Nymphs, Maids of Honor, and the Painter's Gaze series has allowed Betancourt to synthesize diverse aspects of his personal aesthetic. Additionally, on a sculptural level, the artist participated in the project Meninas Take to the Streets (Madrid, 2023), where he intervened on a monumental sculpture of the Infanta Margarita, bringing his reinterpretation of Velázquez to a public and monumental format.

== Works and collections ==
His work can be found in national and international collections: United Nations offices in Vienna and in Geneva (specifically in UNAIDS), Inter-American Development Bank (Tokyo), Diners Club del Ecuador, Istituto Italo-Latino Americano (Rome), Art Museum of the Americas, Organization of American States (Washington D.C.), OFID (the OPEC Fund for International Development), Vienna, the Slade School of Fine Art (London), among others.

== Current work and artistic contribution ==
Miguel Betancourt resides in Quito, in the Cumbayá area, his birthplace, an Andean and equinoctial valley that continues to profoundly influence his work in connection with the surrounding nature.

Throughout his career, Betancourt has maintained a consistent pictorial production. His work serves as a generational bridge between the influences of 20th-century Western modernity and the conceptual approaches of postmodernism within the Ecuadorian art context. As he himself expresses:

"I live by constantly trying to recover the world of childhood, of dreams, of fantastic visions, through my own pictorial perception."

His work continues to explore the links between the modern and the ancestral, as well as the deep relationship with the natural and cultural environment that surrounds him.

== Significant achievements ==
Among his several representations, some of the most important in the 1990s were: the XLV. Venice Biennale, Italy in 1993; Eros in Ecuadorian Art, Chilean National Museum of Fine Arts Santiago de Chile and the National Museum of Archeology, Anthropology and History of Peru Lima, 1998; Ecuador in Spain, Casa de las Americas, Madrid, 2000; and Latin American Artists: A Contemporary Journey, Museum of Latin American Art in Long Beach, California, 2001. Career highlights in the late 2000s include his participation as Guest of Honor to the V. International Art Biennial SIART in La Paz, Bolivia, (2007), and in The Night of the Museums in Buenos Aires, Argentina (2009). At the beginning of 2011, Betancourt participated in the "Exhibition of Latin American and Caribbean Artists" in the Tokyo City Hall. In July 2012, he took part in a collective exhibition "Ecuador Beyond Concepts" at the gallery of the Instituto Cervantes in Rome. In 2013, the Gallery Bandi-Trazos invited him to be part of the Latin-American Pavilion at the International Art Fair, in the Beijing Exhibition Center. In 2014 he was one of three artists at the "Ecuador in Focus" exhibition held at the OPEC Fund for International Development headquarters in Vienna and became founding member of the Art Résilience movement in Paris. In 2016, he participated in ARTE15 as homage to Habitat III in Quito. Since 2017, his itinerant one-man show has been presented in various Asian cities (Beijing, Nanjing, Seoul and Tokyo) as well as in Latin America, including "Ninfas, Meninas y la Mirada del Pintor", in Alianza Francesa, Quito and, also, in the Casa de la Cultura Ecuatoriana, Cuenca, 2018; "Mnemografías", Saladentro gallery, Cuenca, 2019; "Quito Readings", at the Global Migration Forum, Quito, 2020; "Transparencies of the Middle Country", an exhibition of painting on paper, in Torre del Reloj Gallery, Mexico City, 2020. From 2008 to the present date, his work is part of a traveling exhibition, Imago Mundi Collection, which was launched by designer Luciano Benetton and sponsored by the Imago Mundi Foundation.

Betancourt has received several recognitions for his work, including the Pollock-Krasner Award in 1993, conferred by the Pollock-Krasner Foundation in New York City, United States and the Oswaldo Guayasamín Medal awarded by the Metropolitan Council of Quito in December 2020.

Betancourt continues to be involved in various projects and exhibitions in Ecuador and internationally. He was recently invited to participate in the NY Latin American Art Triennial 2022.

=== Publications ===
- Kraemer, S. "Betancourt: from Silence to Color", "Editorial CCE", Quito (Ecuador).
- Lucie-Smith, E. (2020) "Latin American Art Since 1900", "Thames & Hudson", London (United Kingdom).
- Benetton, L. et al. (2017) "Ecuador: light of time – Contemporary artists from Ecuador", Antiga Edizioni, Treviso (Italy).
- Lastra, P. (2016), "El transcurrir del sueño: pinturas de Miguel Betancourt", Editorial del Trauco, Quito (Ecuador).
- Betancourt, M. (2014), "Betancourt – Imágenes a trasluz", Casa de la Cultura Ecuatoriana, Quito (Ecuador).
- Rodríguez, M.A. (2011) "Palabra de Pintores – Artistas del Ecuador", Casa de la Cultura Ecuatoriana, Quito (Ecuador).
- Rodríguez, M.A. (2011) "Betancourt: Colores y Texturas", Casa de la Cultura Ecuatoriana, Quito (Ecuador).
- The curators (2006) "Oil Paintings-London in Public Ownership: The Slade and UCL", Public Catalogue Foundation, London (United Kingdom).
- Flores, I. et al. (2001) "Nuevos Cien Artistas", Revista Mundo Diners, Quito (Ecuador).
- Michelena, X. and Querejeta, A. (1996) "Betancourt", Paradiso Editores, Quito (Ecuador).

Recently, articles about Betancourt's work have appeared in magazines such as Americas (OAS, Washington DC), Gatopardo (Mexico), Infinite Ecuador (Quito) and Dolce Vita (Quito), among others.

== Exhibitions ==
- (2011), "Betancourt: Colores y Texturas", Retrospective Exhibition, Casa de la Cultura Ecuatoriana – Quito, Ecuador.
- 2015 Special Exhibition of Contemporary Ecuadorian Art, VI Beijing International Art Biennial, China
- 2017 Ecuador Through My Dreams, painting on paper, Superior Gallery, Seoul
- 2018 Ninfas, Meninas y la Mirada del Pintor, French Alliance, Quito
- 2020 “Transparencias del país de la mitad” / Galería Torre del Reloj, Ciudad de México, Ecuador
- 2023 “Según la dirección del viento” / Cancillería del Ecuador, Quito, Ecuador
- 2024 "Feminitas, 3 miradas ecuatorianas” / Museo de América, Madrid, Spain
- 2025 PALINGENESIA / Alianza Francesa, Quito, Ecuador

== Gallery ==
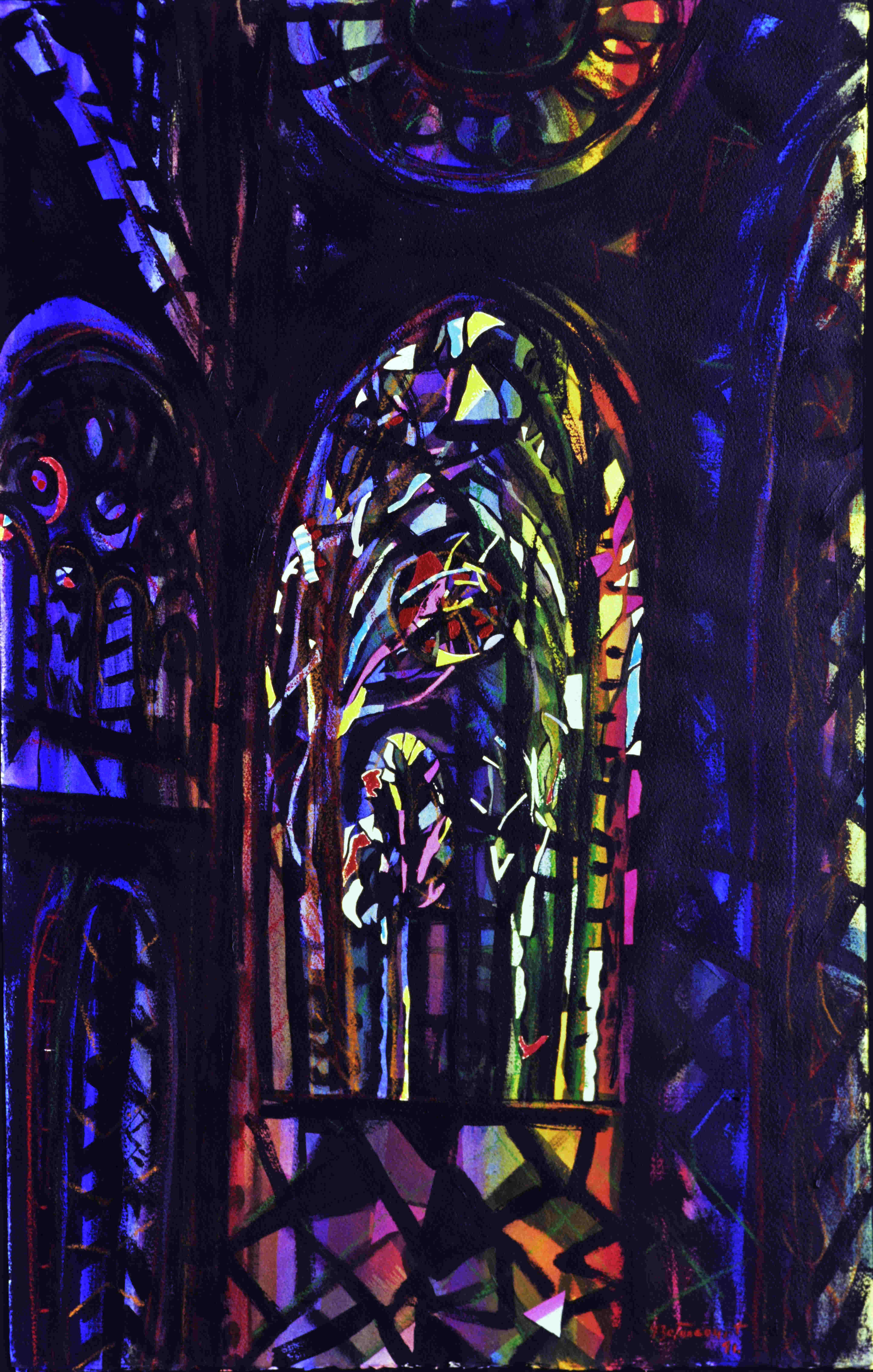
Noche a Punto de Desbordarse, mixed over paper / wood, 120x82cm, 1992

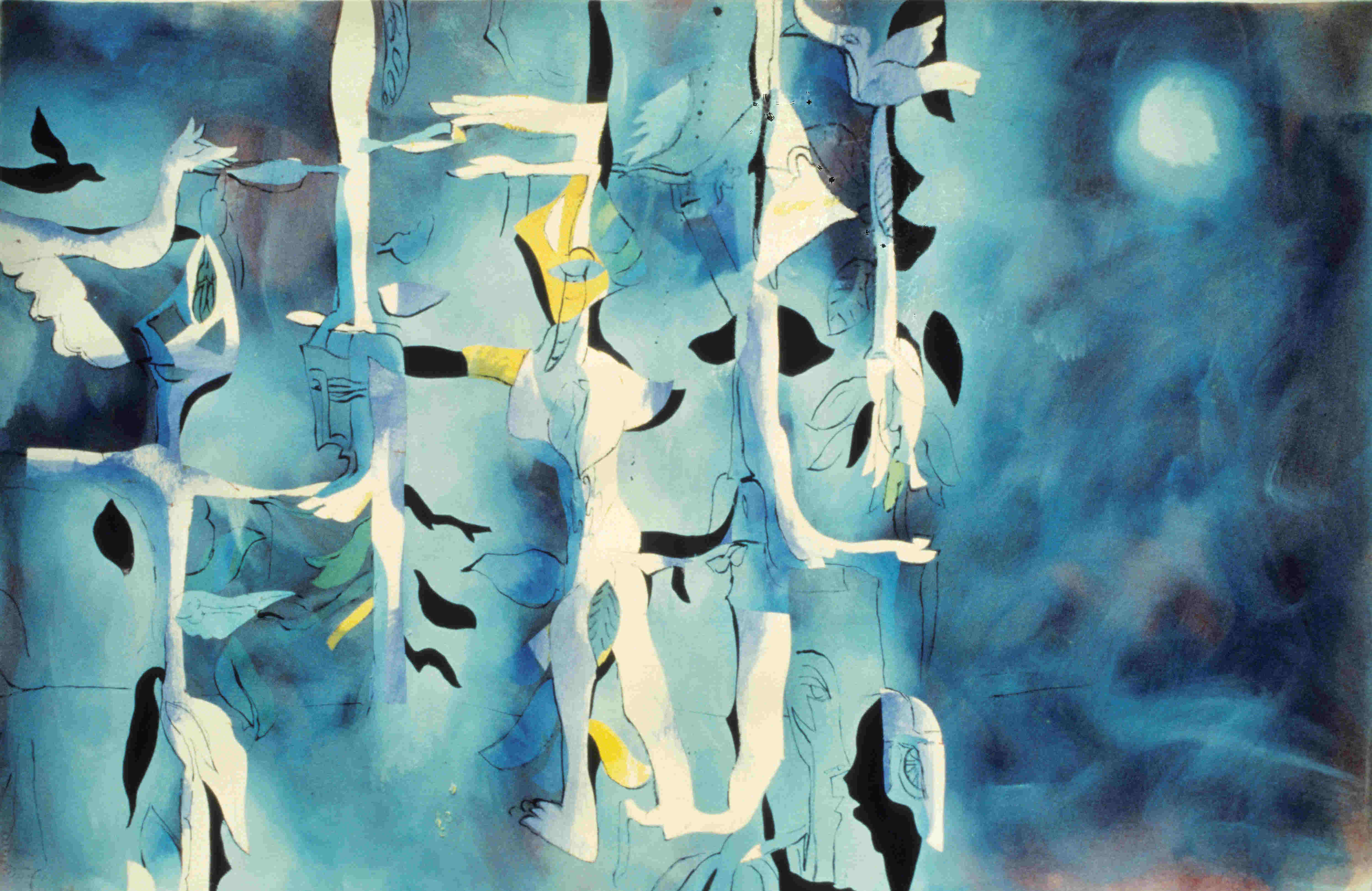
Pajaros de la Encina, acrylic / paper, 66x103cm, 1995

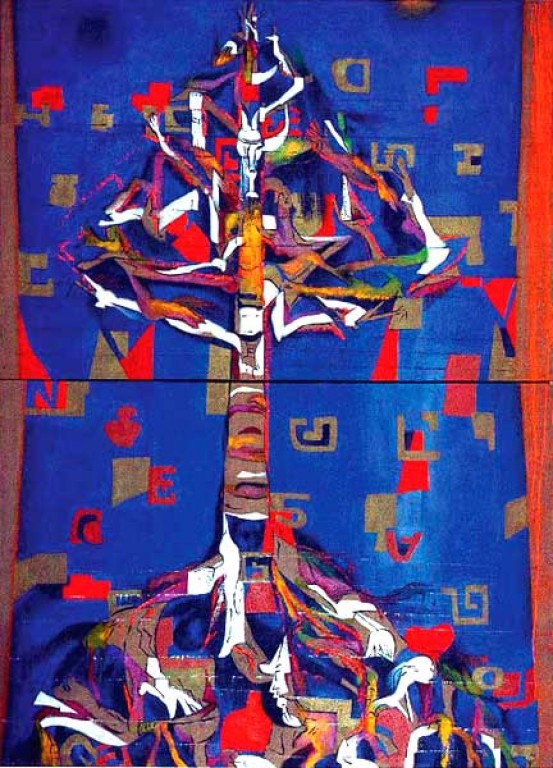
Árbol de letras, mixed / hemp canvas, 256x186cm, 2001

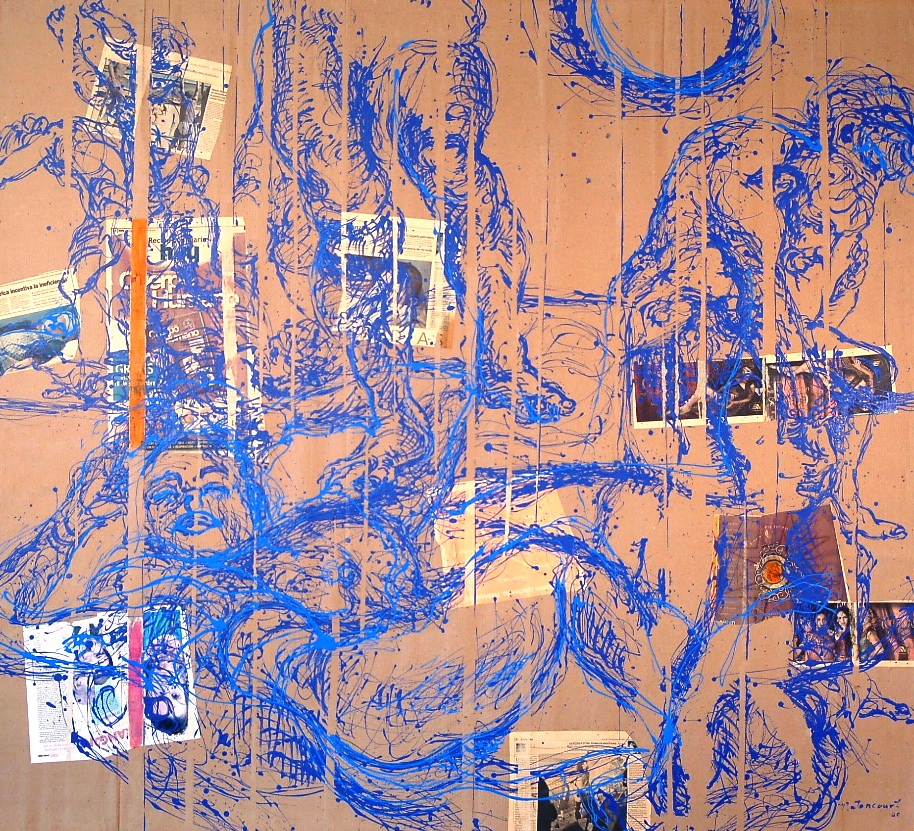
Composicion con Figuras Diversas, acrylic / cardboard / collage, 196x210cm, 2006

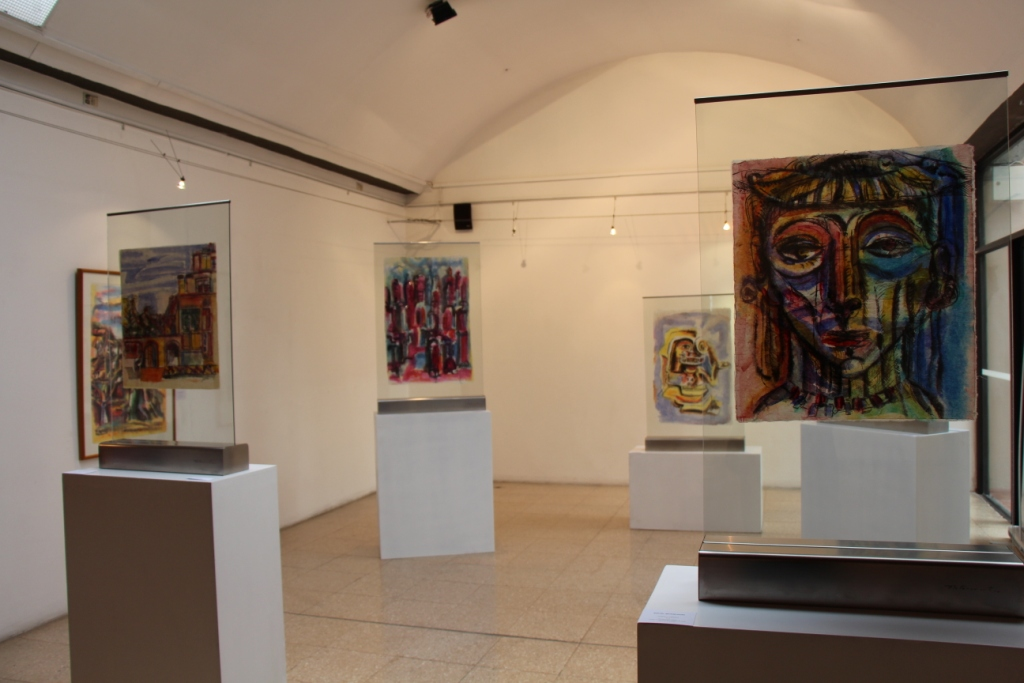
Exhibition Translucent Imagery, 2014

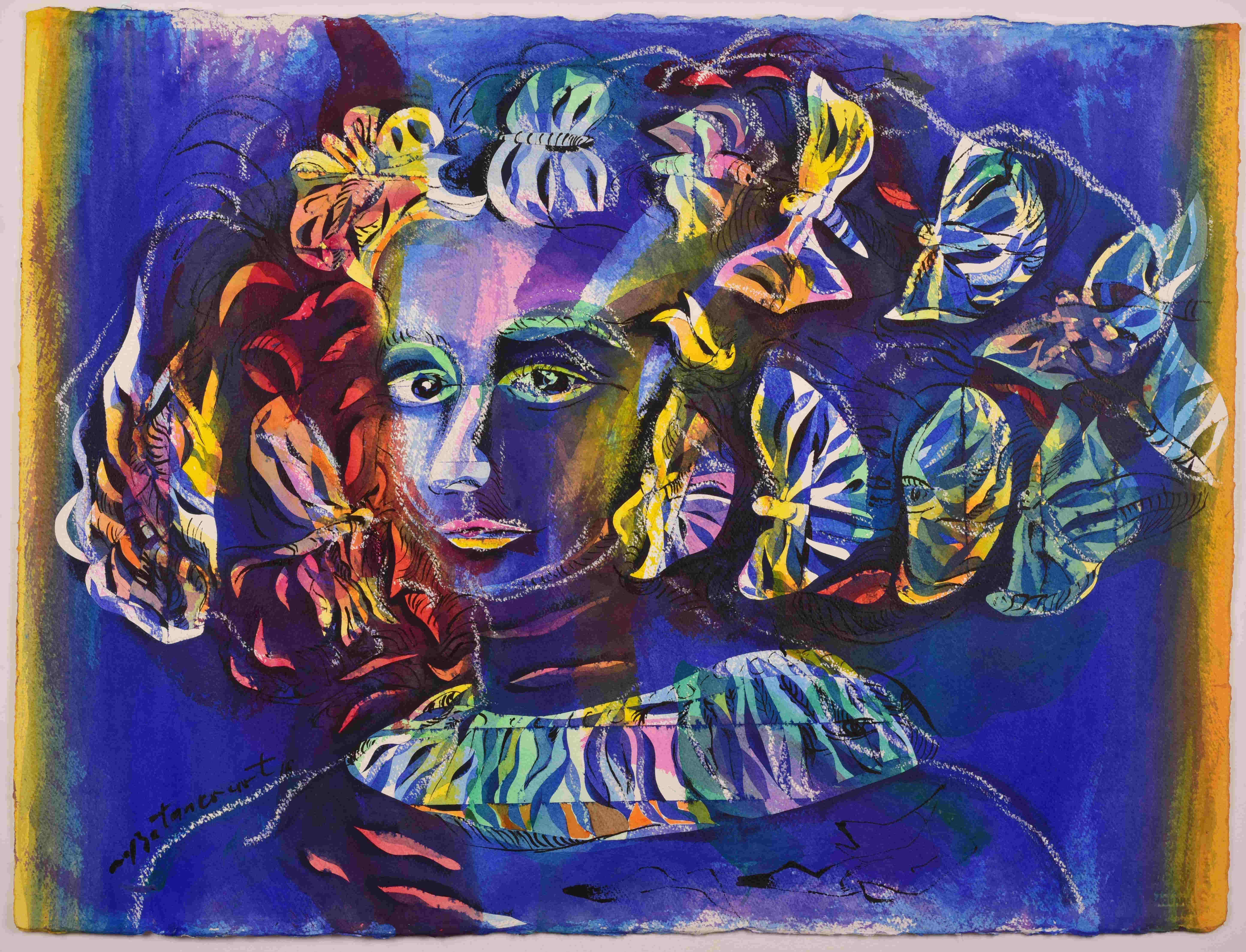
Ninfa con Tocado S.XVII, water color / paper, 57x77cm, 2018

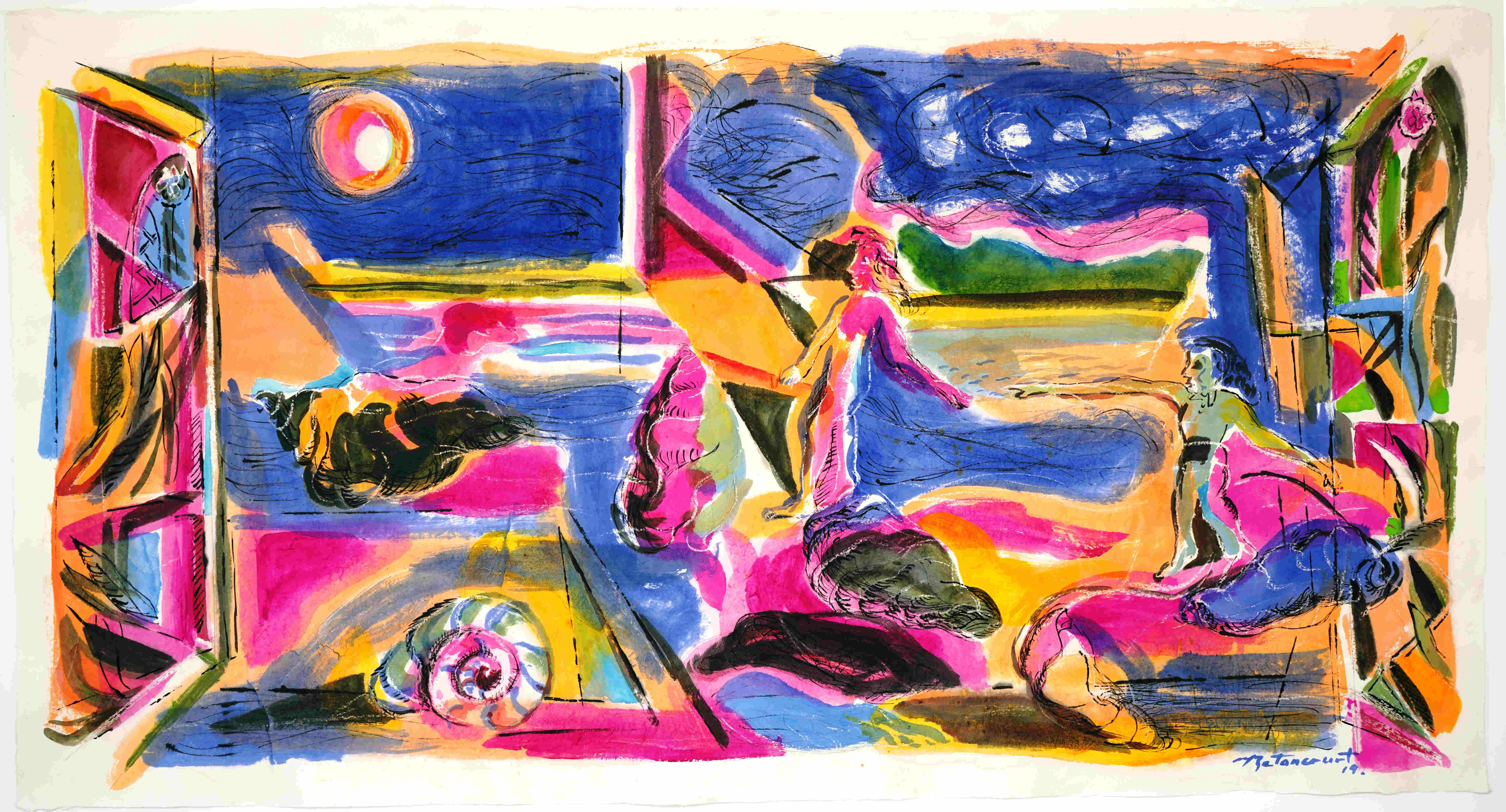
Entrada al Mar, water color / rice paper, 76x142cm, 2019

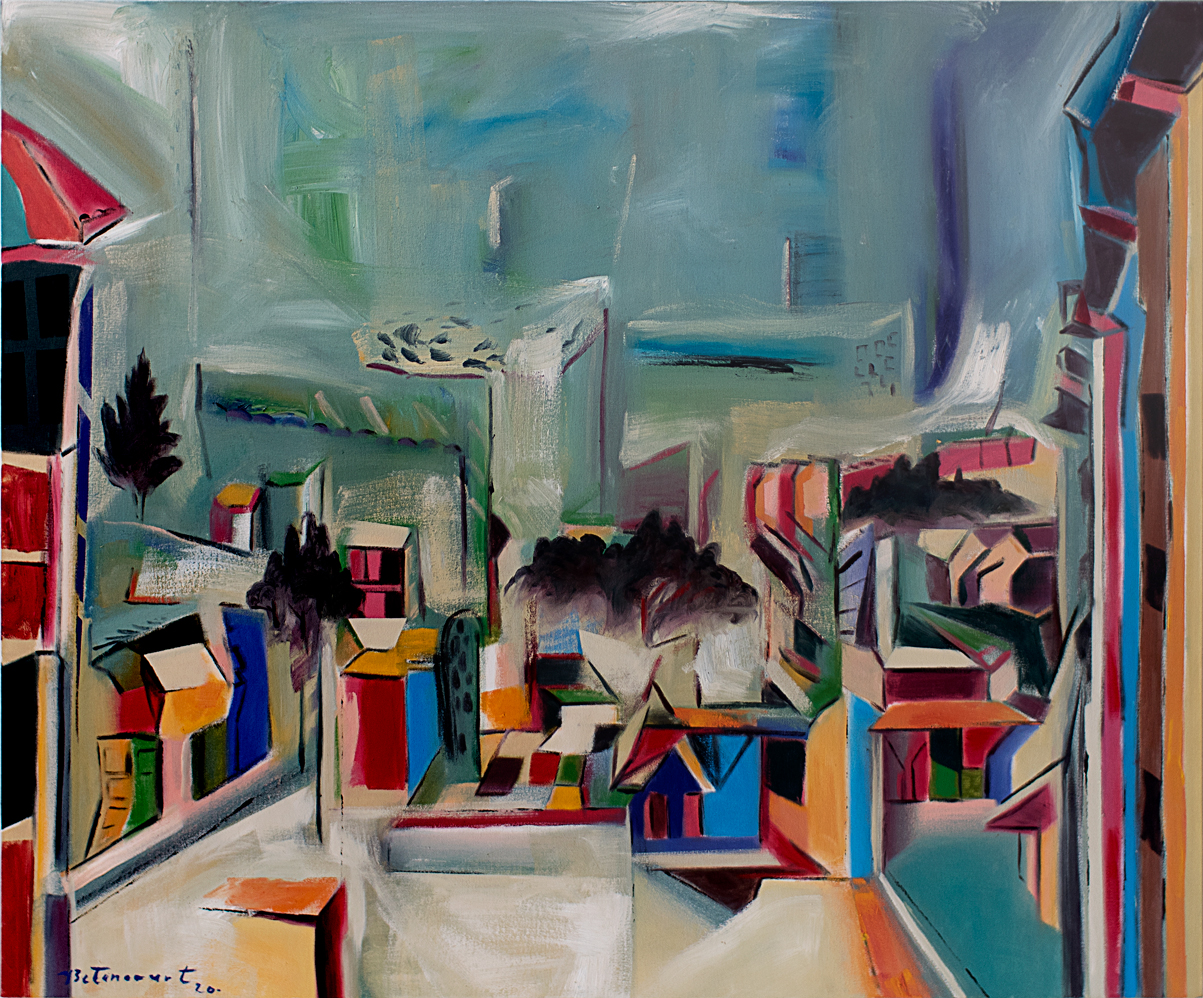
La Llegada del Invierno, oil / canvas, 100x120cm, 2020

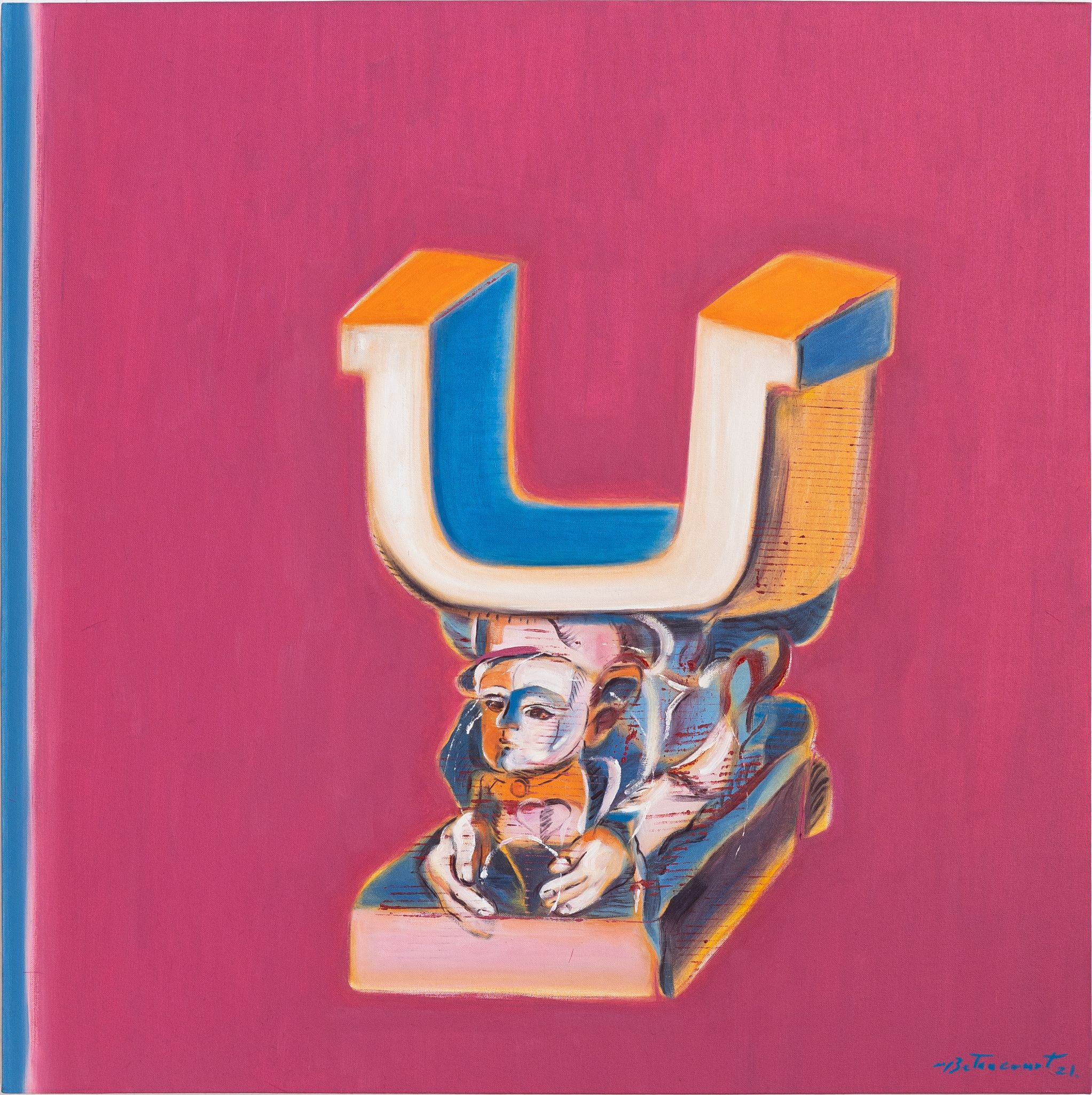
Silla Ceremonial, oil / canvas, 100x100cm, 2021

== See also ==
- Culture of Ecuador
- List of Ecuadorian artists
