= Cumbayá =

- Rural parish
- San Pedro de Cumbayá
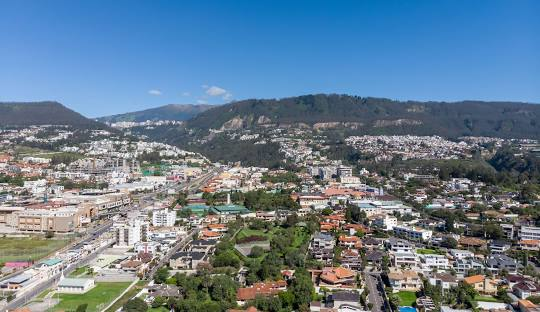

- Location within Ecuador
- Coordinates: 0°12′0″S 78°26′0″W
- Country: Ecuador
- Province: Pichincha
- Canton: Quito
- Foundation: June 29, 1571
- Parish seat: Cumbayá

Government
  - Type: Parochial Junta
  - President: Gustavo Valdéz
  - Vice-President: Blanca Sacancela
  - First Member: Homero Sulca
  - Second Member: Humberto Carreño
  - Third Member: Ana De La Cadena

Area
  - Urban: 20.95 km^{2} (8.09 sq mi)
  - Metro: 4,204 km^{2} (1,623 sq mi)
- Elevation approx.: 2,200 m (7,200 ft)

Population (2022)
  - Rural parish: 41,819
  - Density: 1,996/km^{2} (5,170/sq mi)
  - Metro: 2,679,722
  - Metro density: 637.4/km^{2} (1,651/sq mi)
- Time zone: UTC-5 (ECT)
- Postal Code: EC170157
- Area code: (0)2

Cumbayá is a rural parish of the Metropolitan District of Quito in the Pichincha Province, Ecuador. It is located east of Quito, in the Tumbaco Valley northwest of the Ilaló volcano, in the San Pedro River valley, a tributary of the Guayllabamba River.

== Climate ==
At an elevation of 2200 m (7200 ft) above sea level, Cumbayá is lower than Quito and its climate is about 2 to 5 degrees Celsius warmer. Weather is semi tropical year-round, with a short rainy season.

Climate data for Tumbaco, elevation 2,348 m (7,703 ft), (1961–1990)
Month	Jan	Feb	Mar	Apr	May	Jun	Jul	Aug	Sep	Oct	Nov	Dec	Year
Mean daily maximum °C (°F)	25.2 (77.4)	24.7 (76.5)	24.7 (76.5)	24.6 (76.3)	25.2 (77.4)	25.0 (77.0)	25.3 (77.5)	25.6 (78.1)	25.7 (78.3)	25.0 (77.0)	24.7 (76.5)	25.2 (77.4)	25.1 (77.2)
Daily mean °C (°F)	17.2 (63.0)	17.0 (62.6)	17.2 (63.0)	17.0 (62.6)	17.1 (62.8)	16.7 (62.1)	16.6 (61.9)	16.7 (62.1)	17.0 (62.6)	16.8 (62.2)	16.7 (62.1)	17.1 (62.8)	16.9 (62.5)
Mean daily minimum °C (°F)	9.6 (49.3)	9.6 (49.3)	9.8 (49.6)	9.8 (49.6)	9.1 (48.4)	8.5 (47.3)	7.4 (45.3)	7.5 (45.5)	8.1 (46.6)	9.5 (49.1)	9.3 (48.7)	9.1 (48.4)	8.9 (48.1)
Average precipitation mm (inches)	63.0 (2.48)	123.0 (4.84)	123.0 (4.84)	155.0 (6.10)	79.0 (3.11)	37.0 (1.46)	13.0 (0.51)	30.0 (1.18)	72.0 (2.83)	105.0 (4.13)	103.0 (4.06)	79.0 (3.11)	982 (38.65)
Source: FAO

== Developments ==
In the years up to 2008, the parish has become a commuter town of Quito as a significant number of middle-upper and higher class families moved from the city to live a more suburban lifestyle. A significant amount of expensive and luxurious properties of Quito can be found in Cumbaya making it the highest income area in the country. This shift in population has attracted investors and entrepreneurs to the area, boosting the local economy. In 2017 there has been commercial activity centered around restaurants ranging from food trucks to gourmet-style places. The town is also characterized by many gated communities that vary in size and wealth.

Cumbayá has become home to the main campus of the Universidad San Francisco de Quito. International students of the campus are placed in host families in Quito for cultural immersion. Quorum Quito, built in the late eighties and located in Paseo San Francisco in the Cumbayá Valley gathered parliamentarians from all over the world at the assemblee of the Interparliamentary Union in 2013.

== Population Growth ==
Historically a quiet agricultural retreat, Cumbayá has undergone a profound demographic transformation over the last seventy years. In 1950, the parish was home to a modest community of approximately 4,838 residents. This figure nearly doubled by 1970, reaching 10,323 as the area began to attract those seeking a valley climate outside of Quito's urban core.

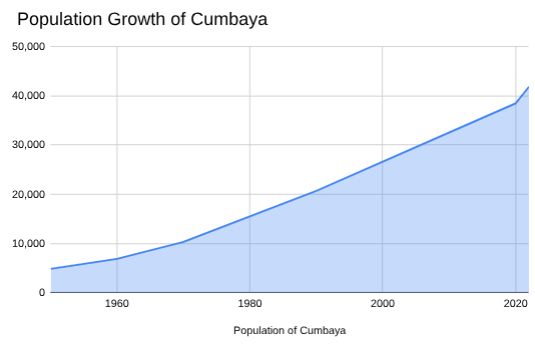
Chart of Cumbaya Population Growth

The turn of the century marked a period of rapid suburbanization; by the early 2000s, the population surged to 26,623. This upward trajectory continued into the following decades, with estimates placing the population at 38,450 in 2020 "Cumbayá Population". According to the most recent 2022 census, Cumbayá’s population reached 41,819 people, reflecting its status as one of the most significant and fastest-growing rural parishes in the Metropolitan District "Current Population".

== Architecture ==
Examples of architecture drawing from the area's rural beginnings include the Iglesia de Cumbayá in the Main Square and the Iglesia de Miravalle built in 1987. Modern examples include the Rancho San Francisco complex, Paseo San Francisco, La Esquina, Centro Plaza, Scala and Villa Cumbayá shopping centers, among new office blocks.

== Traffic and tourism ==
The Túnel Oswaldo Guayasamín, named after the revered Quito born painter and sculptor Oswaldo Guayasamín, is the longest vehicular tunnel in Ecuador at 1.5 kilometres and connects the parish with the Iñaquito urban parish of the city of Quito.

In 2004, the Chaquiñán rail trail from Cumbayá to the parish of Puembo, 20 kilometres to the northeast was re-opened.
