= Margaret Theresa of Spain =

Holy Roman Empress from 1666 to 1673

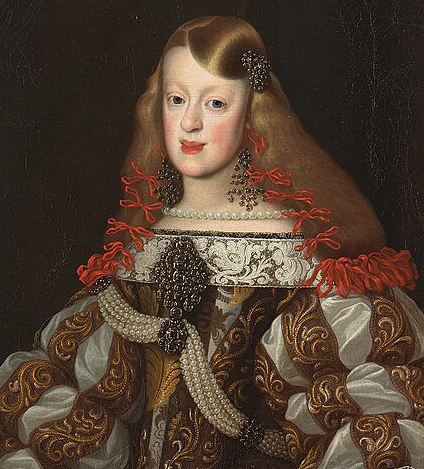
- Portrait by Jan Thomas van Ieperen, c. 1670

Holy Roman Empress
- Tenure: 25 April 1666 – 12 March 1673
- Born: 12 July 1651; Royal Alcazar, Madrid, Crown of Castile
- Died: 12 March 1673 (aged 21); Hofburg Palace, Vienna, Archduchy of Austria, Holy Roman Empire
- Burial: Imperial Crypt
- Spouse: Leopold I, Holy Roman Emperor (m. 1666)
- Issue Detail: Ferdinand of Austria; Maria Antonia, Electress of Bavaria; John Leopold of Austria; Maria of Austria
- House: Habsburg
- Father: Philip IV of Spain
- Mother: Mariana of Austria

Margaret Theresa of Spain (Spanish: Margarita Teresa, German: Margarete Theresia; 12 July 1651 – 12 March 1673) was, by marriage to Leopold I, Holy Roman Empress, German Queen, Archduchess of Austria and Queen of Hungary and Bohemia. She was the daughter of King Philip IV of Spain and the elder full-sister of Charles II, the last of the Spanish Habsburgs. She is the central figure in the famous Las Meninas by Diego Velázquez, and the subject of many of his later paintings.

== Biography ==
=== Early years ===
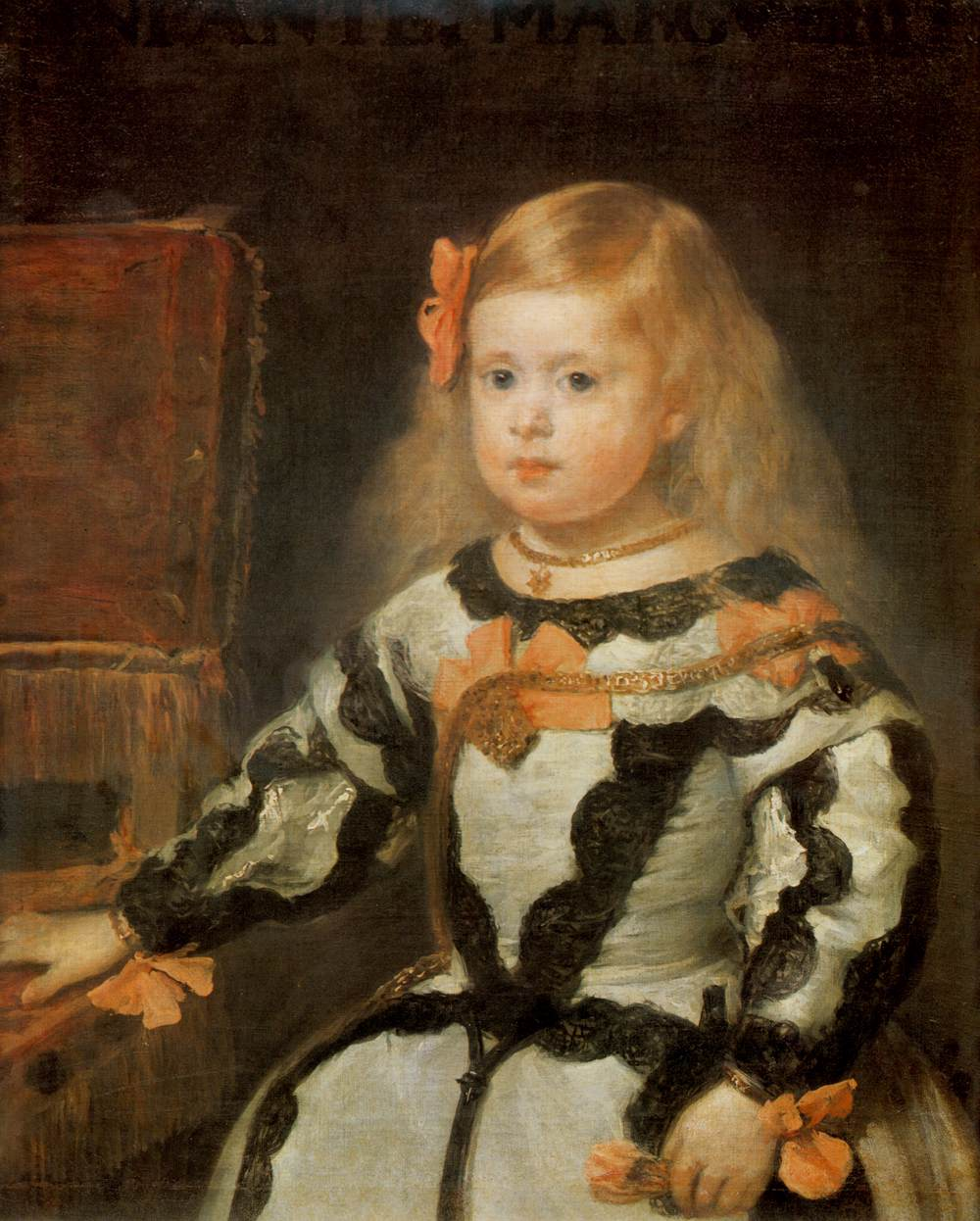
Infanta Margarita Teresa (1655), Velázquez, Musée du Louvre, Paris

Margaret Theresa was born on 12 July 1651 in Madrid as the first child of King Philip IV of Spain born from his second marriage with his niece Mariana of Austria. Margaret's mother was nearly thirty years younger than her father.

Margaret's paternal grandparents were King Philip III of Spain and his wife Archduchess Margaret of Austria. Her maternal grandparents were Ferdinand III, Holy Roman Emperor, and his wife Infanta Maria Anna of Spain, the daughter of her paternal grandparents.

The marriage of her parents was purely made for political reasons, mainly the search for a new male heir for the Spanish throne after the early death of Balthasar Charles, Prince of Asturias, in 1646. Besides him, the only other surviving child of Philip IV's first marriage was the Infanta Maria Theresa, who later became the wife of King Louis XIV of France. After Margaret, between 1655 and 1661, four more children (a daughter and three sons) were born from the marriage between Philip IV and Mariana of Austria, but only one survived infancy, the future King Charles II of Spain.

Despite the close consanguinity of her parents, Margaret did not develop the serious health issues and disabilities that her younger brother had shown since his birth. During her childhood, she was once seriously ill, but survived. According to contemporaries, Margaret had an attractive appearance and lively character. Her parents and close friends called her the "little angel". She grew up in the queen's chambers in the Royal Alcazar of Madrid surrounded by many maids and servants. Both Margaret's father and maternal grandfather Emperor Ferdinand III loved her deeply. In his private letters King Philip IV called her "my joy". At the same time, Margaret was brought up in accordance with the strict etiquette of the Madrid court, and received a good education.

=== Betrothal and marriage ===
In the second half of the 1650s at the imperial court in Vienna the necessity developed for another dynastic marriage between the Spanish and Austrian branches of the House of Habsburg. The union was needed to strengthen the position of both countries, especially against the Kingdom of France. At first the proposals were for Maria Theresa, the eldest daughter of Philip IV, to marry the heir of the Holy Roman Empire, Archduke Leopold Ignaz. But in 1660 and under the terms of the Treaty of the Pyrenees, Maria Theresa was married to the French King, Louis XIV; as a part of her marriage contract, she was asked to renounce her claims to the Spanish throne in return for a monetary settlement as part of her dowry, which was never paid.

Since her childhood, her parents decided that Margaret would marry a relative from the Austrian branch of the Habsburgs in order to maintain her succession rights within the dynasty. The main marriage candidate was the Holy Roman Emperor Leopold I (who was her maternal uncle and paternal cousin). During that era, people were not aware of the risk of inbreeding. Both the family and diplomatic correspondence of the time reveal that they did not find anything wrong with it. Although the Spanish court hesitated to agree to this proposal, because the infanta could inherit the Spanish crown if her little brother died, both King Philip IV and Queen Mariana strongly wanted their daughter to marry Emperor Leopold I, as their private correspondence with the nun Sor María de Ágreda shows. The title of Holy Roman Emperor was one of the highest-ranking and most prestigious in Europe at that time, so this was a splendid match for Margaret and for the Spanish crown. Therefore, the Holy Roman Emperor was the only serious marriage candidate considered by the Spanish court for Margaret Theresa. In 1659, King Philip IV expressed his desire to offer the hand of his daughter Margaret Theresa in marriage to Emperor Leopold I, through the Spanish ambassador in Vienna. In February 1660, Emperor Leopold officially asked King Philip and Queen Mariana for the hand of Margaret Theresa in marriage, and they accepted in April of the same year. Thus, Margaret became engaged to Emperor Leopold when she was only 8 years old.

Even when the infanta was already betrothed to the Emperor, there were still rumors that Margaret could marry Archduke Charles Joseph of Austria, who was Leopold's youngest brother, and in case the future King Charles II died, then Margaret and Charles Joseph would become the next Spanish monarchs. The fact that the young Archduke was Catholic and a Habsburg made him completely acceptable for the Spanish court, which would never accept a member from another dynasty, and even less a Protestant, as a marriage candidate for Margaret Theresa. In any case, the rumors about a marriage to the Archduke came to nothing and Margaret remained betrothed to Emperor Leopold. At the end of 1662, the Emperor sent Count Pötting to Madrid to conduct marriage negotiations. In October 1662, the new Imperial ambassador in Spain, Count Francis Eusebius of Pötting, began one of his main diplomatic assignments, which was the celebration of the marriage between the infanta and the emperor. Negotiations by the Spanish side were led by Ramiro Núñez de Guzmán, Duke of Medina de las Torres. On 6 April 1663, the betrothal between Margaret and Leopold I was finally announced to the public. In May 1663, Philip IV wrote to the nun Sor María de Ágreda, expressing his happiness at the official and public engagement of his daughter Margaret to Emperor Leopold. The marriage contract was signed on 18 December. Before the official wedding ceremony (which, according to custom, had to take place in Vienna) another portrait of the infanta was sent, in order for the emperor to know his bride.

King Philip IV died on 17 September 1665. In his will, he mentioned Margaret's marriage to Emperor Leopold I, and stated that, if her younger brother died, then Margaret would inherit the Spanish throne, and Queen Mariana would act as regent, in case the infanta and her husband, the Emperor, were abroad. This means that Philip IV's idea was that, if Charles II died, then Margaret and Leopold would become joint rulers of Spain, even if they were absent. After Philip IV's death, Mariana asked the ministers to confirm Margaret’s marriage to Leopold I, which they did. On 25 April 1666, the marriage by proxy was finally celebrated in Madrid, in a ceremony attended not only by the Dowager Queen, King Charles II and the Imperial ambassador but also by the local nobility; the groom was represented by Antonio de la Cerda, 7th Duke of Medinaceli.

On 28 April 1666 Margaret traveled from Madrid to Vienna, accompanied by her personal retinue. The infanta arrived at Dénia, where she rested for some days before embarking on the Spanish royal fleet on 16 July, in turn escorted by ships of the Order of Malta and the Grand Duchy of Tuscany. Then (after a short stop in Barcelona because Margaret had some health issues) the cortege sailed to the port of Finale Ligure, arriving on 20 August. There, Margaret was received by Luis Guzman Ponce de Leon, Governor of Milan. The cortege left Finale on 1 September and arrived in Milan ten days later, although the official entry was not celebrated until 15 September. After spending almost all September in Milan, the infanta continued the journey through Venice, arriving in early October in Trento. At every stop Margaret received celebrations in her honor. On 8 October the Spanish retinue arrived at the city of Roveredo, where the head of Margaret's cortege, Francisco Fernández de la Cueva, 8th Duke of Alburquerque officially handed the infanta to Ferdinand Joseph, Prince of Dietrichstein, and Count Ernst Adalbert von Harrach, Prince-Bishop of Trent, representants of Leopold I. On 20 October the new Austrian cortege left Roveredo, crossing Tyrol, through Carinthia and Styria, and arrived on 25 November at the district of Schottwien, twelve miles from Vienna where the emperor came to receive his bride.

=== Holy Roman Empress and German Queen ===
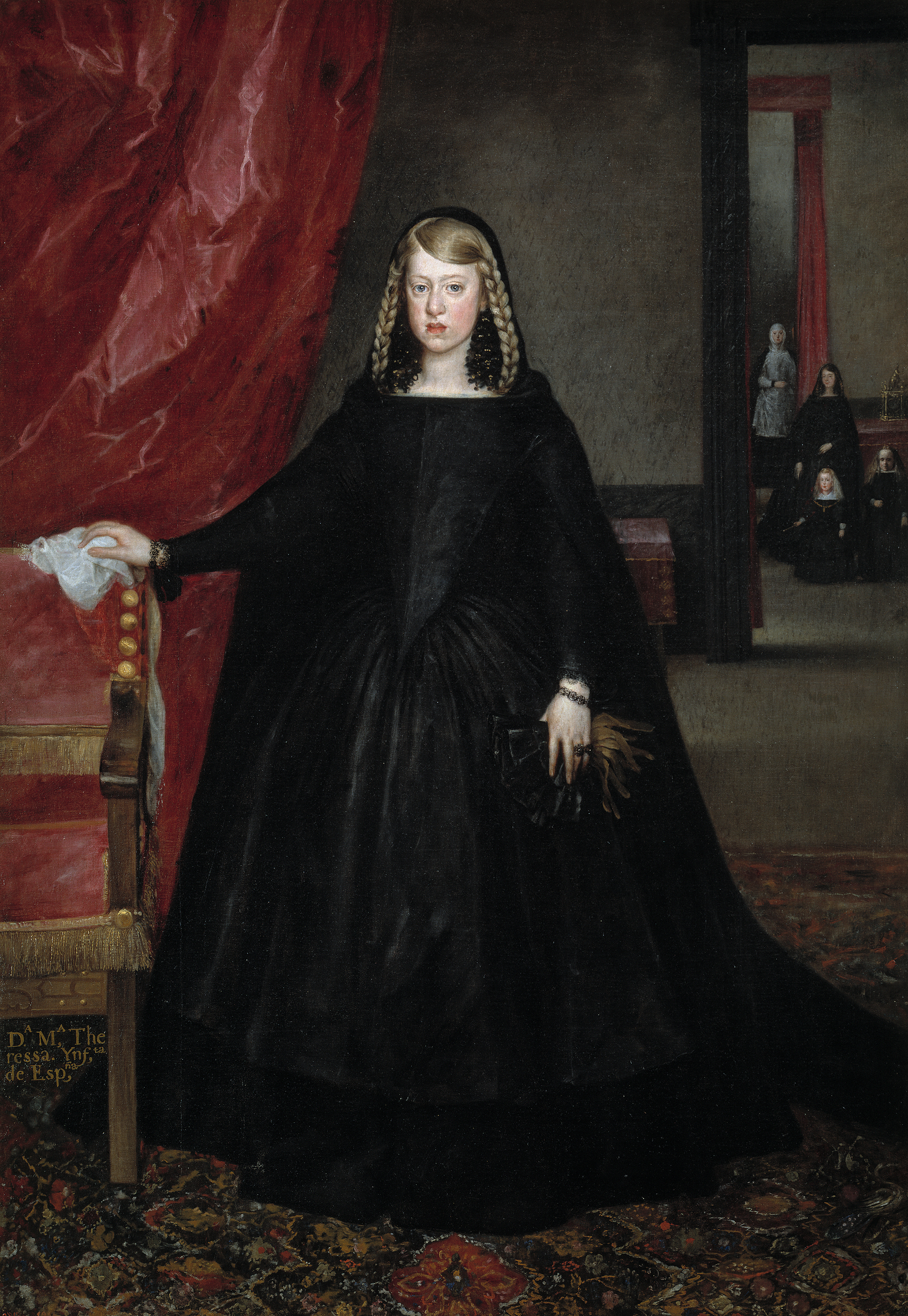
Infanta Margarita Teresa, aged 14, in mourning for her father. The Infanta left Spain to become Holy Roman Empress the same year. Painted by Juan Bautista Martínez del Mazo (1666), Museo del Prado, Madrid.

The infanta formally entered Vienna on 5 December 1666. The official marriage ceremony was celebrated seven days later. The Viennese celebrations of the imperial marriage were among the most splendid of all the Baroque era, and lasted almost two years.

The emperor ordered the construction of an open-air theatre near the present Burggarten, with a capacity of 5,000 people. For Margaret's birthday in July 1668, the theatre hosted the premiere of the opera Il pomo d'oro (The Golden Apple). Composed by Antonio Cesti, the opera was called the "staging of the century" by contemporaries due to its magnificence and expense. The year before, the emperor gave an equestrian ballet where he personally mounted on his horse, Speranza; due to technical adaptations, the ballet gave spectators the impression that horses and carriages were hovering in the air.

Despite the age difference, they had a happy marriage, according to contemporaries. The empress always called her husband "Uncle" (de: Onkel), and he called her "Gretl" (a German diminutive of Margaret). The couple had many common interests, especially in art and music. Even after her marriage, Margaret kept her Spanish customs and ways. Surrounded almost exclusively by her native retinue (which included secretaries, confessors, and doctors), she loved Spanish music and ballets and therefore hardly learned the German language.

During her six years of marriage, Margaret gave birth to four children, of whom only one survived infancy:

- Ferdinand Wenceslaus Joseph Michael Eleazar (28 September 1667 – 13 January 1668), Archduke of Austria
- Maria Antonia Josepha Benedicta Rosalia Petronella (18 January 1669 – 24 December 1692), Archduchess of Austria, who inherited her mother's claims to the Spanish throne, married Maximilian II Emanuel, Elector of Bavaria, and was the mother of Joseph Ferdinand of Bavaria
- John Leopold (born and died 20 February 1670), Archduke of Austria
- Maria Anna Josepha Antonia Apollonia Scholastica (9 February 1672 – 23 February 1672), Archduchess of Austria

The empress reportedly inspired her husband to expel the Jews from Vienna. During the Corpus Christi celebration of 1670, the emperor ordered the destruction of the Vienna synagogue and a church was built on the site on his orders.

=== Death ===
Weakened due to six pregnancies in six years (four living childbirths and two miscarriages) and four months into her seventh pregnancy, Margaret died on 12 March 1673, at the age of 21. She was buried in the Imperial Crypt, in Vienna. Only four months later, the widower emperor – despite his grief for the death of his "only Margareta", as he remembered her, entered into a second marriage with Archduchess Claudia Felicitas of Austria, member of the Tyrolese branch of the House of Habsburg.

After Margaret's death, her rights over the Spanish throne were inherited by her only surviving daughter Maria Antonia, who in turn passed them to her only surviving son Prince Joseph Ferdinand of Bavaria when she died in 1692. After Joseph Ferdinand's early death in 1699, the rights of inheritance were disputed by both Emperor Leopold I and King Louis XIV of France, son-in-law of King Philip IV. The outcome of the War of the Spanish Succession was the creation of the Spanish branch of the House of Bourbon in the person of King Philip V, Margaret's great-nephew.

== Depictions in art ==
Shortly before the birth of Margaret, painter Diego Velázquez returned to the Spanish court in Madrid. From 1653 to 1659 a series of portraits of the infanta were painted. Three of them – Infanta Margarita Teresa in a Peach Dress (1653), Infanta Margarita in a White and Silver Dress (1656) and Infanta Margarita Teresa in a Blue Dress (1659) – were sent to the Imperial court in Vienna, and now are displayed in the Kunsthistorisches Museum. In the last paintings of the 8-year-old infanta made by Velázquez, a more mature and formal attitude of Margaret can be seen, due to her upcoming marriage to the emperor.

The most famous painting by Velazquez in the series of portraits of the infanta was Las Meninas (1656), currently in the Museo del Prado in Madrid. In it, the artist painted the 5-year-old infanta in his studio while working on a portrait of her parents. She is surrounded by her maids of honor and other courtiers, but her eyes are riveted to her parents, whose reflection is visible in the mirror on the wall. The canvas was the inspiration for Picasso, who in 1957 created more than forty variations of this pattern.

The image of Margaret in the paintings by Velázquez inspired not only painters. The poet Boris Pasternak mentions it in a poem of 1923 "Butterfly Storm", in which she appears to him as a vision during a thunderstorm in Moscow. The first image in this poem who Pasternak contrasted with the portraits of the Infanta was mentioned by Vyacheslav Vsevolodovich Ivanov, in his work "Eternal Childhood".

The Infanta Margarita Teresa in a Pink Dress (1660), formerly credited to Velázquez, is now considered one of the masterpieces of his son-in-law, Juan Bautista Martínez del Mazo. To Martínez del Mazo also belongs the latter "Portrait of the Infanta Margarita in mourning dress" (1666), in which she is depicted shortly after her father's death and shortly before her wedding. Both paintings are also included in the collection of the Museo del Prado. The authority of the "Portrait of the Infanta Margarita" (1655) currently at the Louvre, is still questioned by researchers.

There are portraits of an adult Margaret by a number of European artists, most of which are stored in the collections of the Kunsthistorisches Museum in Vienna. Among them, "a full-length portrait of the Infanta Margarita Teresa, the Empress" (1665) by Gerard Du Chateau and "Portrait of Empress Margarita Teresa in a theatrical costume" (1667) by Jan Thomas van Ieperen. One of the last portraits of Margaret is the "Portrait of Empress Margarita Teresa and her daughter Maria Antonia" (c. 1670) by Jan Thomas van Ieperen, currently in the Hofburg, where she is depicted with her only surviving child. Numerous copies of her portraits are also preserved, and are now kept in the museum collections around the world.

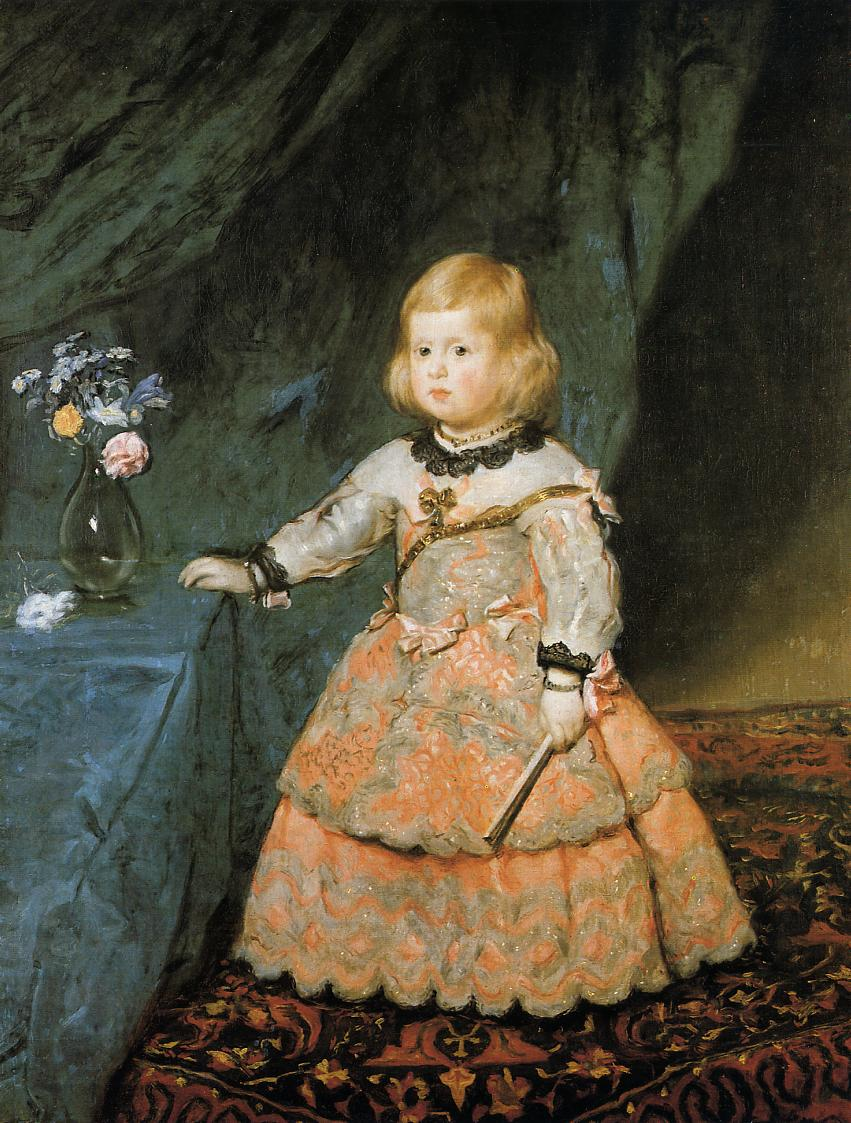
Infanta Margarita Teresa in a Pink Dress (1653), Velázquez, Kunsthistorisches Museum, Vienna.

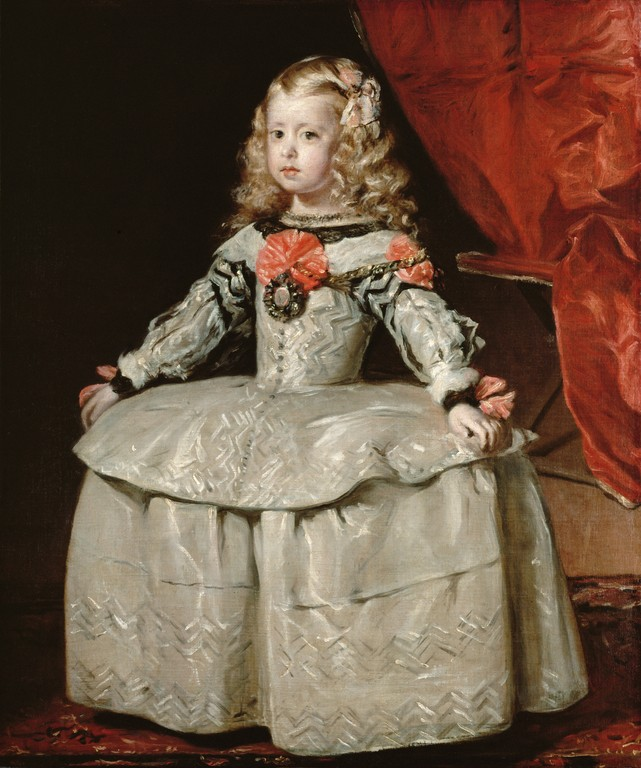
Infanta Margarita in a White and Silver Dress (1656), Velázquez, Kunsthistorisches Museum, Vienna.

Las Meninas (1656), Velázquez, Prado Museum, Madrid.

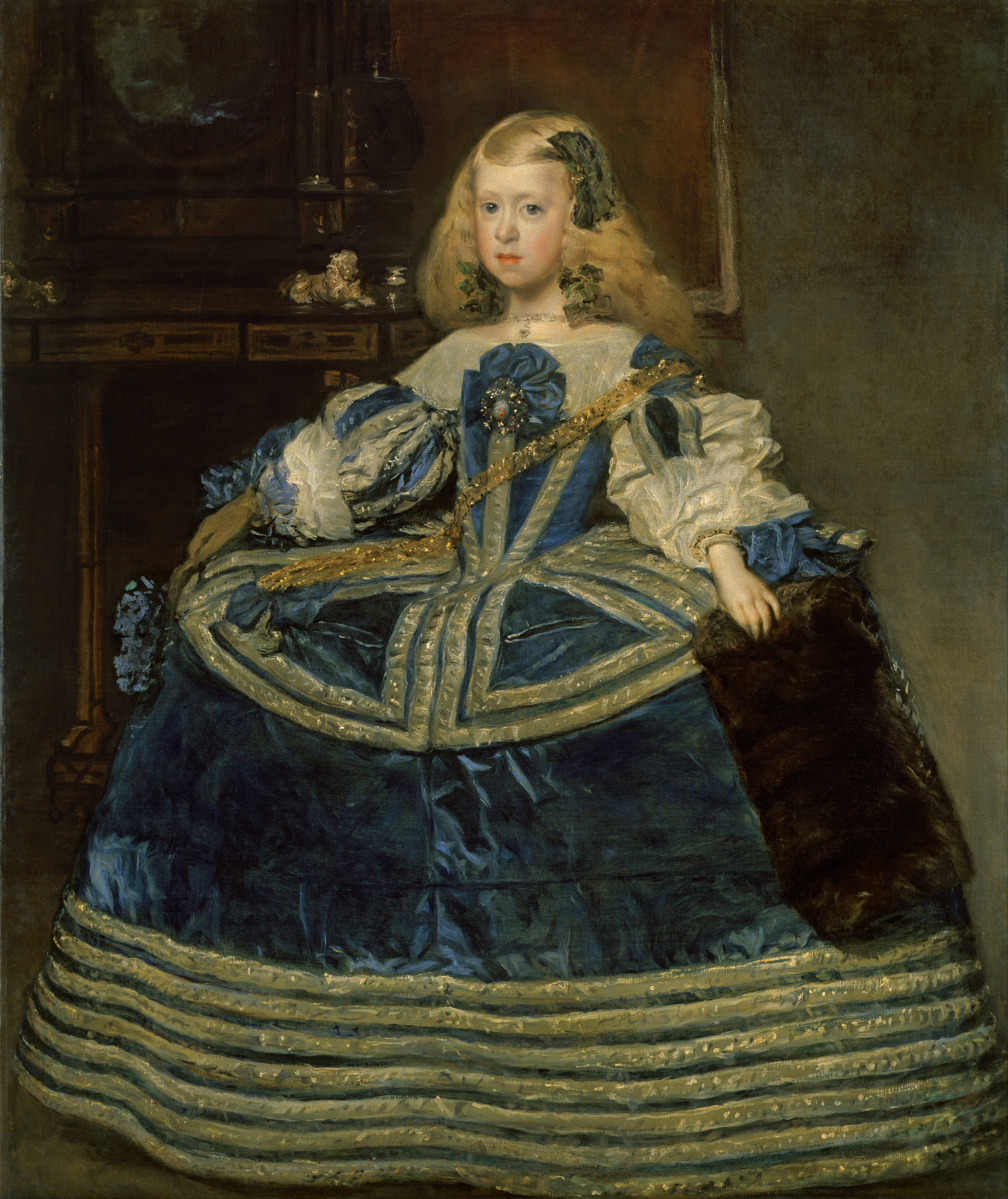
Infanta Margarita Teresa in a Blue Dress (1659), Velázquez, Kunsthistorisches Museum, Vienna.

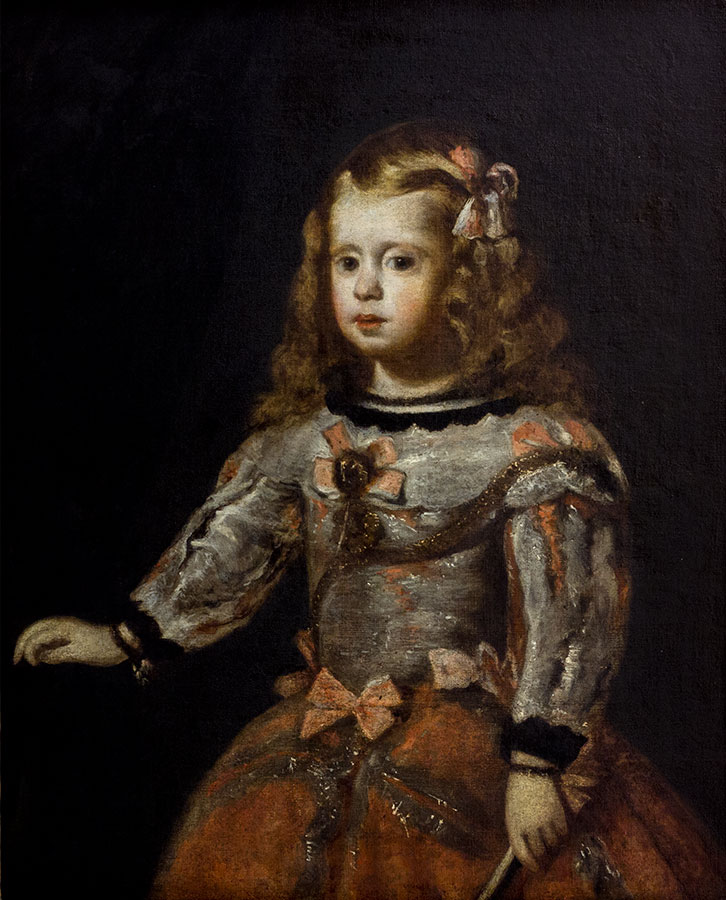
Infanta Margarita Teresa of Spain in pink dress, attributed to Juan Bautista Martínez del Mazo.

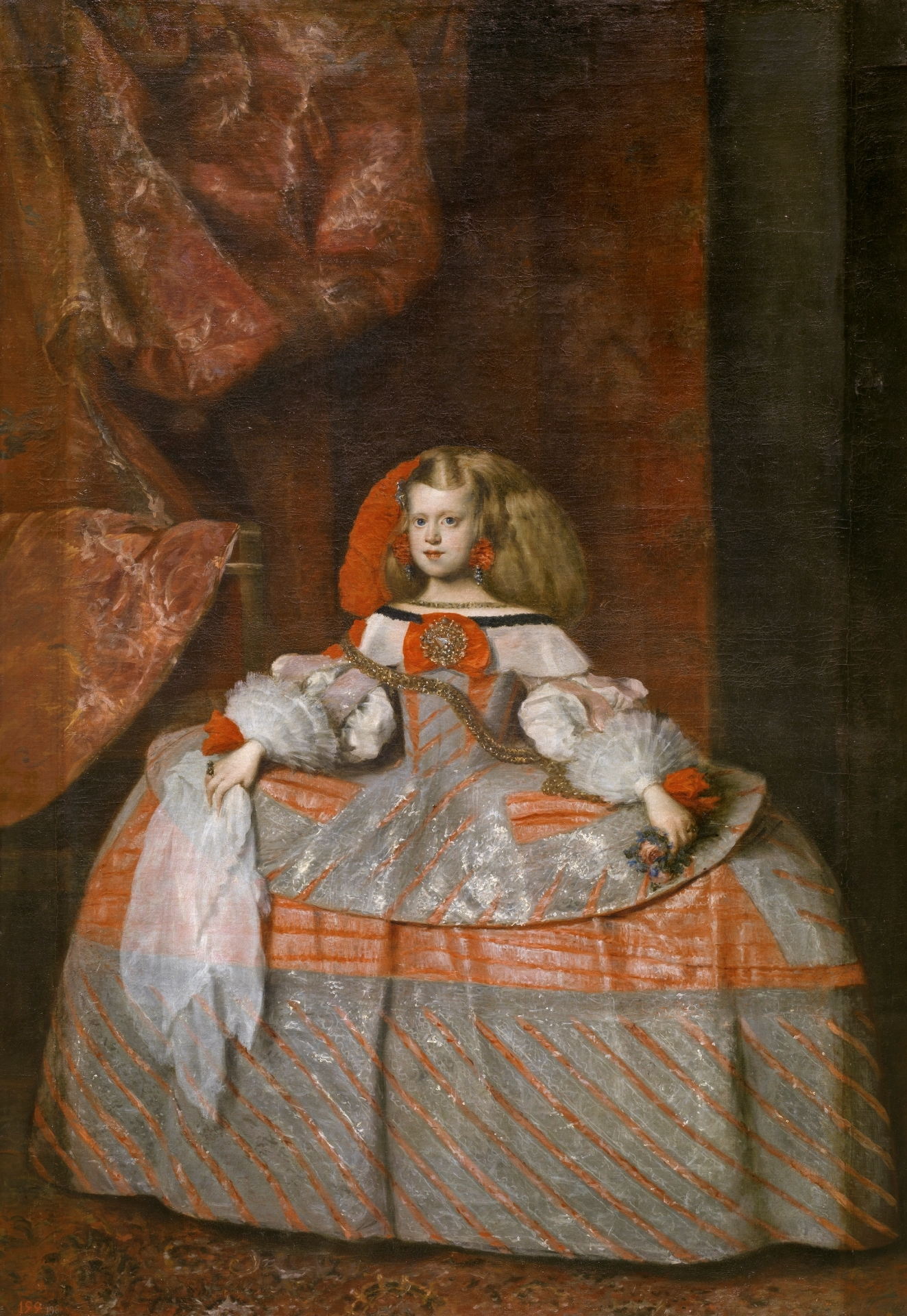
Infanta Margarita Teresa in a Pink Dress (1660) by Velázquez or Juan Bautista Martínez del Mazo, Prado Museum, Madrid.

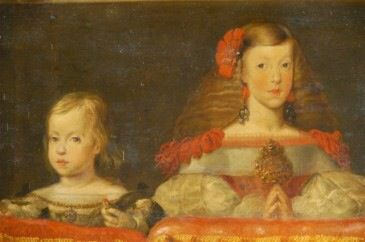
Infanta Margarita and her brother Felipe Próspero (ca. 1660-1661), attributed to Antonio de Pereda, Descalzas Reales, Madrid.

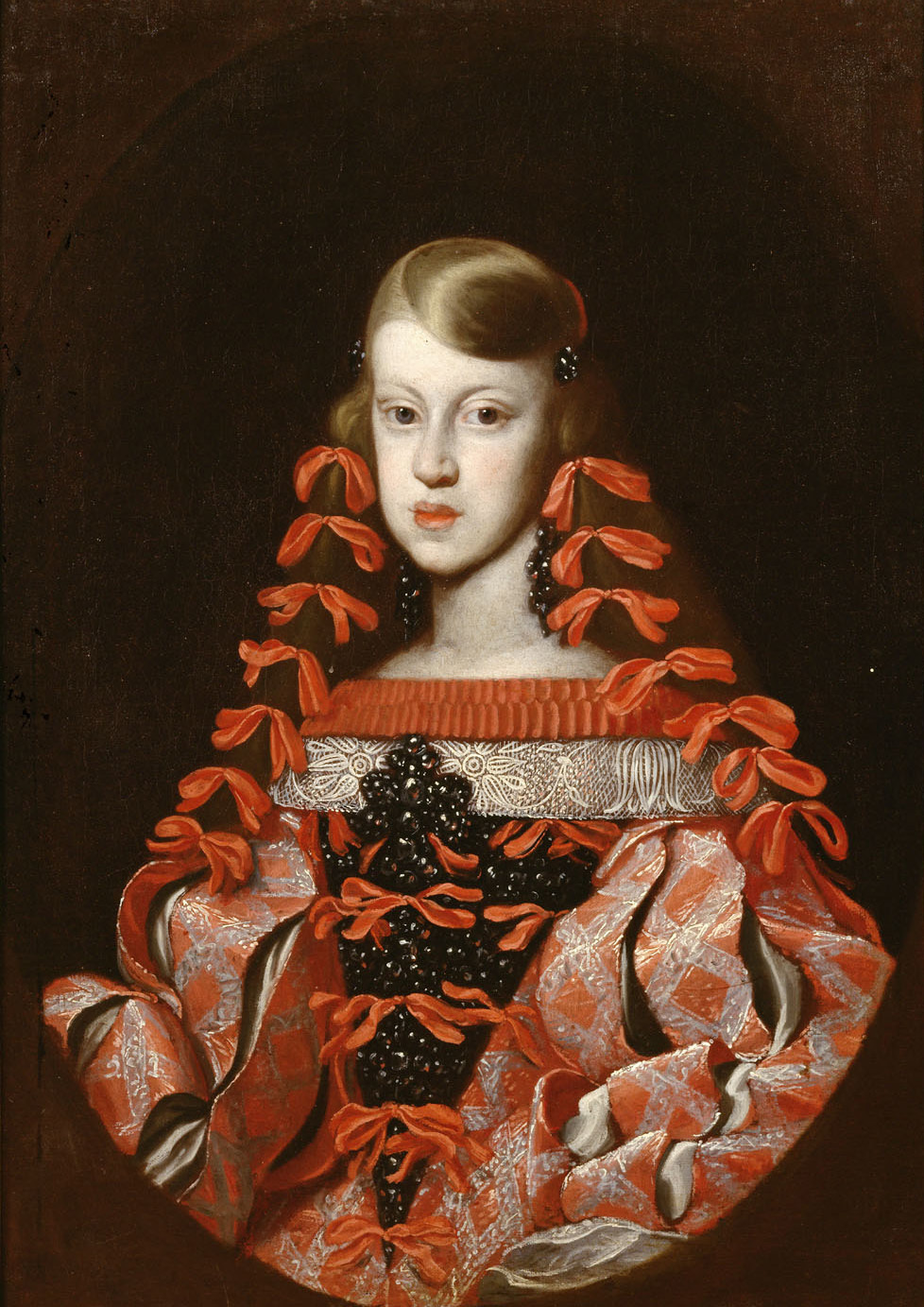
Margaret Theresa in red and silver silk dress, aged between 10 and 13, Kunsthistorisches Museum, Vienna.

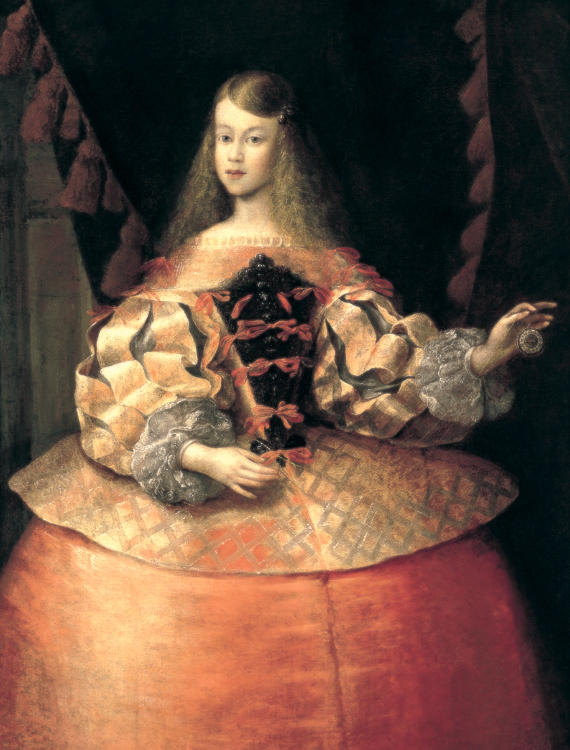
Infanta Margarita Teresa in orange dress (1665), by Francisco Ignacio Ruiz de la Iglesia.

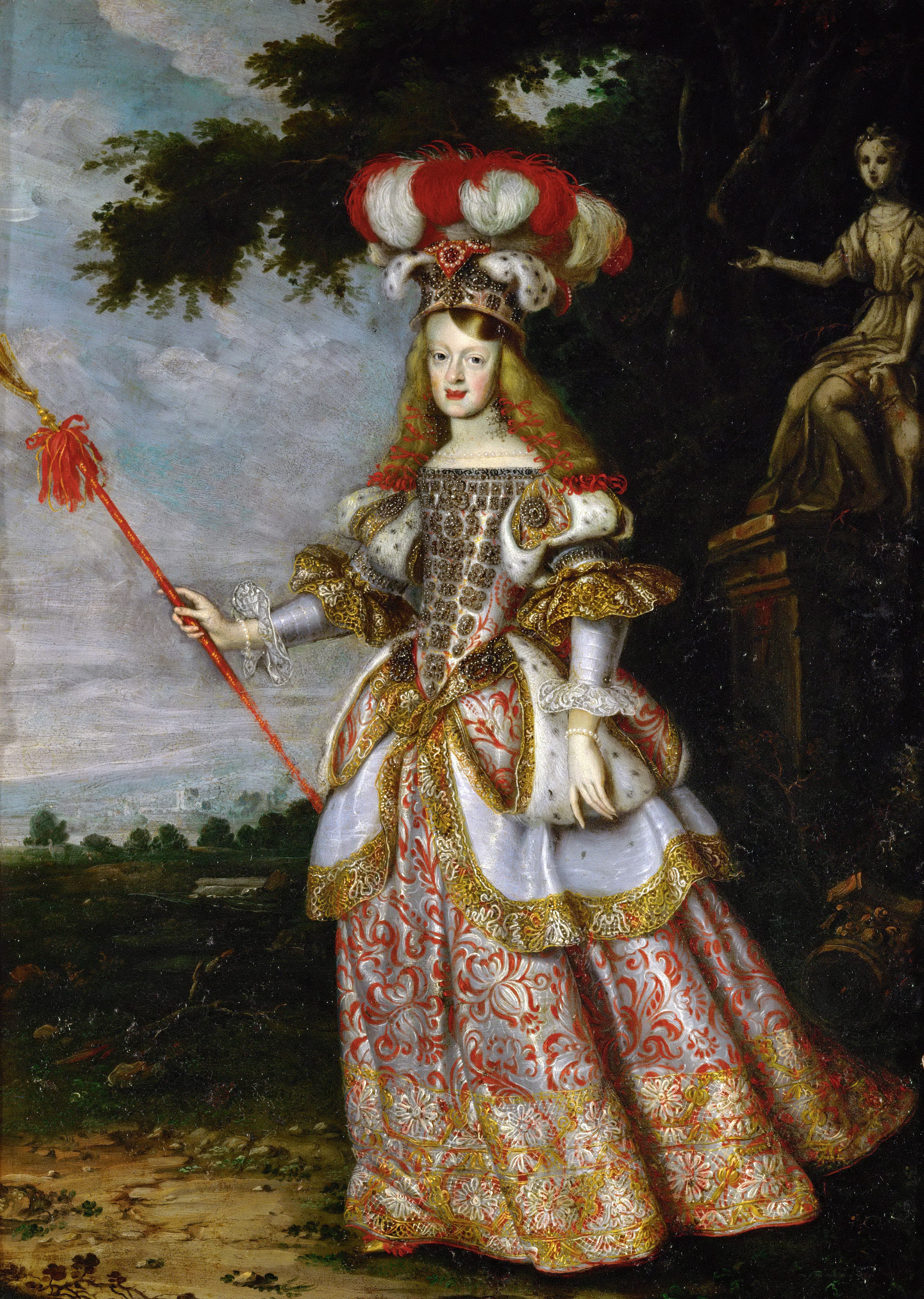
Infanta Margaret Theresa, Empress, in theater dress (1667) by Jan Thomas van Ieperen, Kunsthistorisches Museum, Vienna.

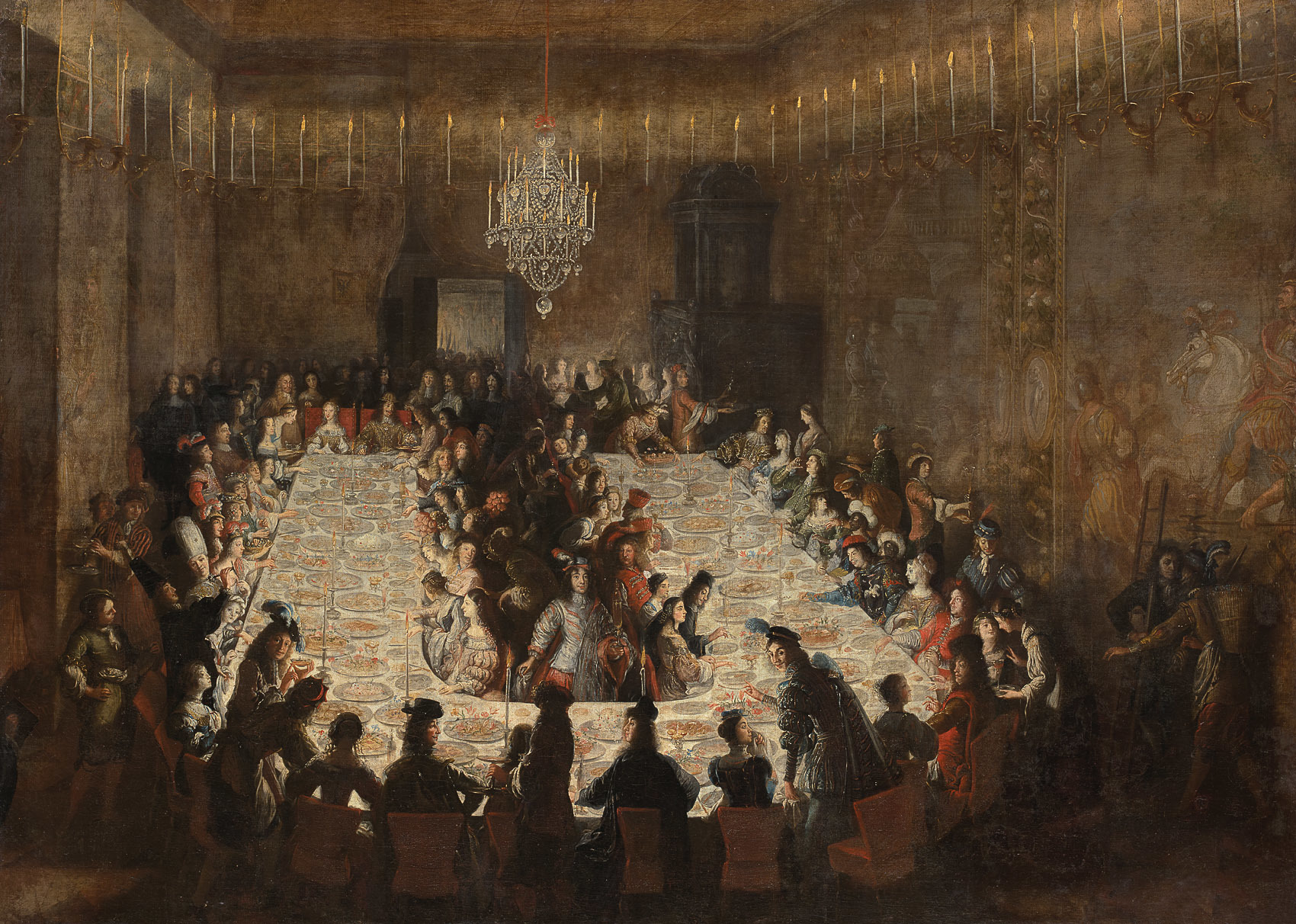
Emperor Leopold I and Empress Margarita Teresa preside over a banquet at the imperial court in Vienna (c. 1666–1667), attributed to Jan Thomas van Ieperen, Kunsthistorisches Museum, Vienna.

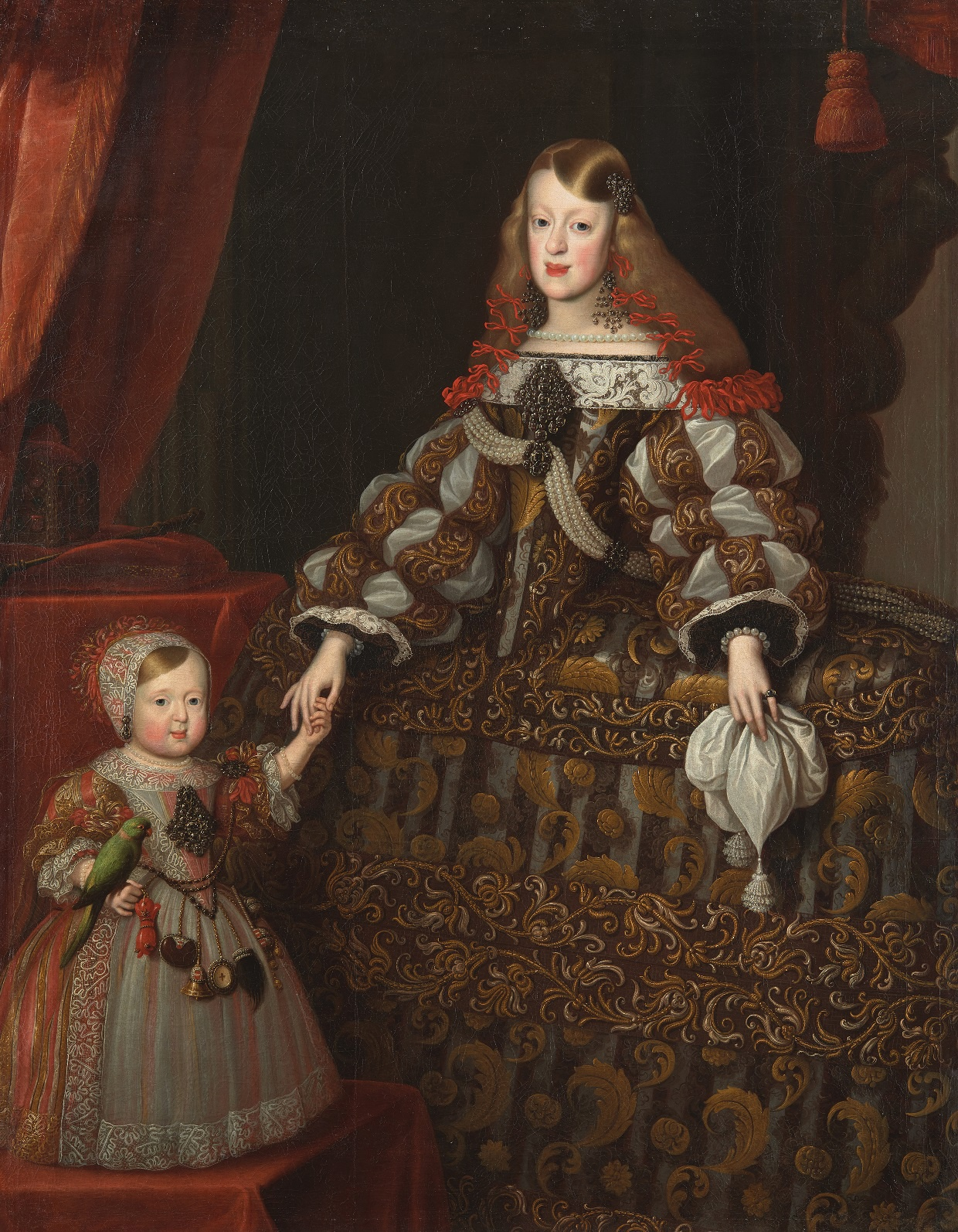
Empress Margarita Teresa and her daughter Maria Antonia (c. 1670) by Jan Thomas van Ieperen, Hofburg Palace, Vienna.

== Ancestors ==
Ancestors of Margaret Theresa of Spain

Philip I of Castile (Note: Charles V, Holy Roman Emperor at the Encyclopædia Britannica); 1478–1506
Isabella of Portugal; 1503–39 | Charles V Holy Roman Emperor; 1500–58 | Ferdinand I Holy Roman Emperor (Note: Press, Volker (1990). "Maximilian II.". Neue Deutsche Biographie (in German). Vol. 16. Berlin: Duncker & Humblot. pp. 471–475. (full text online).); 1503–64
Maria of Spain; 1528–1603 | Maximilian II; Holy Roman Emperor; 1527–76
Philip II of Spain; 1527–98 | Anna of Austria; 1549–80 | Charles II; Archduke of Austria (Note: Eder, Karl (1961). "Ferdinand II.". Neue Deutsche Biographie (in German). Vol. 5. Berlin: Duncker & Humblot. pp. 83–85. (full text online).); 1540–90
Philip III of Spain; 1578–1621 | Margaret of Austria; 1584–1611
Maria Anna of Spain; 1606–46
Philip IV of Spain; 1605–65 | Mariana of Austria; 1634–96
Margaret Theresa of Spain; 1651–1673

Joanna of Castile; 1479–1555
Anna of Bohemia and Hungary; 1503–47 | Isabella of Austria; 1501–26 | Christian II of Denmark; 1481–1559
Anna of Austria; 1528–90 | Albert V Duke of Bavaria; 1528–1579 | Christina of Denmark; 1522–90 | Francis I Duke of Lorraine; 1517–45
Maria Anna of Bavaria; 1551–1608 | William V Duke of Bavaria; 1548–1626 | Renata of Lorraine; 1544–1602
Ferdinand II; Holy Roman Emperor; 1578–1637 | Maria Anna of Bavaria; 1574–1616
Ferdinand III; Holy Roman Emperor; 1608–57
Leopold I Holy Roman Emperor; 1640–1705

== Bibliography ==
- Andics, Hellmut, Die Frauen der Habsburger (Vienna: Jugend und Volk, 1985). In German.
- Beutler, Gigi, Die Kaisergruft (Vienna, 2001). In German.
- Domínguez Ortiz, Antonio, Testamento de Felipe IV, Madrid: Editora Nacional, 1982. In Spanish. ISBN 978-84-276-0609-8
- Hamann, Brigitte, Die Habsburger: Ein Biografisches Lexicon (Munich: Piper, 1988). In German.
- Ingrao, Charles W., Editor and author, In Quest and Crisis: Emperor Joseph I and the Habsburg Monarchy, Hardcover: 278 pages, Purdue University Press (1 June 1979), in English, ISBN 0-911198-53-9, ISBN 978-0-911198-53-9
- Ingrao, Charles W., The Habsburg Monarchy, 1618–1815 (New Approaches to European History) [Paperback], # Paperback: 288 pages, Cambridge University Press; 2 edition (2 October 2000), in English, ISBN 0-521-78505-7, ISBN 978-0-521-78505-1
- Kann, Robert A., A History of the Habsburg Empire, 1526–1918, Paperback, 661 pages, University of California Press, edition (26 November 1980), in English ISBN 0-520-04206-9 ISBN 978-0520042063.
- Kann, Robert A., The Peoples of the Eastern Habsburg Lands, 1526–1918 (History of East Central Europe), [Hardcover],# 464 pages, Univ of Washington Press, (July 1984), in English, ISBN 0-295-96095-7, ISBN 978-0-295-96095-1
- Magosci, Paul Robert, ´´Historical Atlas of Central Europe (History of East Central Europe, Vol. 1, 1), Paperback: 288 pages, University of Washington Press, in English, Revised Exp edition (October 2002), ISBN 0-295-98146-6, ISBN 978-0-295-98146-8
- Mitchell, Silvia Z.: Queen, Mother, and Stateswoman. Mariana of Austria and the Government of Spain, University Park: Pennsylvania State University Press, 2019. ISBN 978-027108339-1
- Olivan Santaliestra, Laura, "My sister is growing up very healthy and beautiful, she loves me" – The Childhood of the Infantas Maria Teresa and Margarita Maria at Court, pp. 165–185 in: Grace E. Coolidge – The Formation of the Child in Early Modern Spain, Farnham: Ashgate Publishing 2014, ISBN 978-1-47-242880-6
- Rudolf, Karl; Opll, Ferdinand, España y Austria, Madrid: Cátedra, 1997. In Spanish. ISBN 978-84-376-1523-3
- Wheatcroft, Andrew, "The Habsburgs, Embodiyng Empire" [Paperback], 416 pages, Penguin Books, (Non-Classics) (1 May 1997), in English, ISBN 0-14-023634-1, ISBN 978-0-14-023634-7

=== Royal titles ===
Margaret Theresa of Spain House of Habsburg Born: 12 July 1651 Died: 12 March 1673
Royal titles
| Vacant Title last held by Eleanor of Mantua | Holy Roman Empress; Queen consort of Germany; Archduchess consort of Austria; 1666–1673 | Vacant Title next held by Claudia Felicitas of Austria |
| Vacant Title last held by Eleanor of Mantua | Queen consort of Hungary and Bohemia; 1666–1673 | Vacant Title next held by Claudia Felicitas of Austria |
