= Infanta Margarita Teresa in a Peach Dress =

Painting by Diego Velázquez

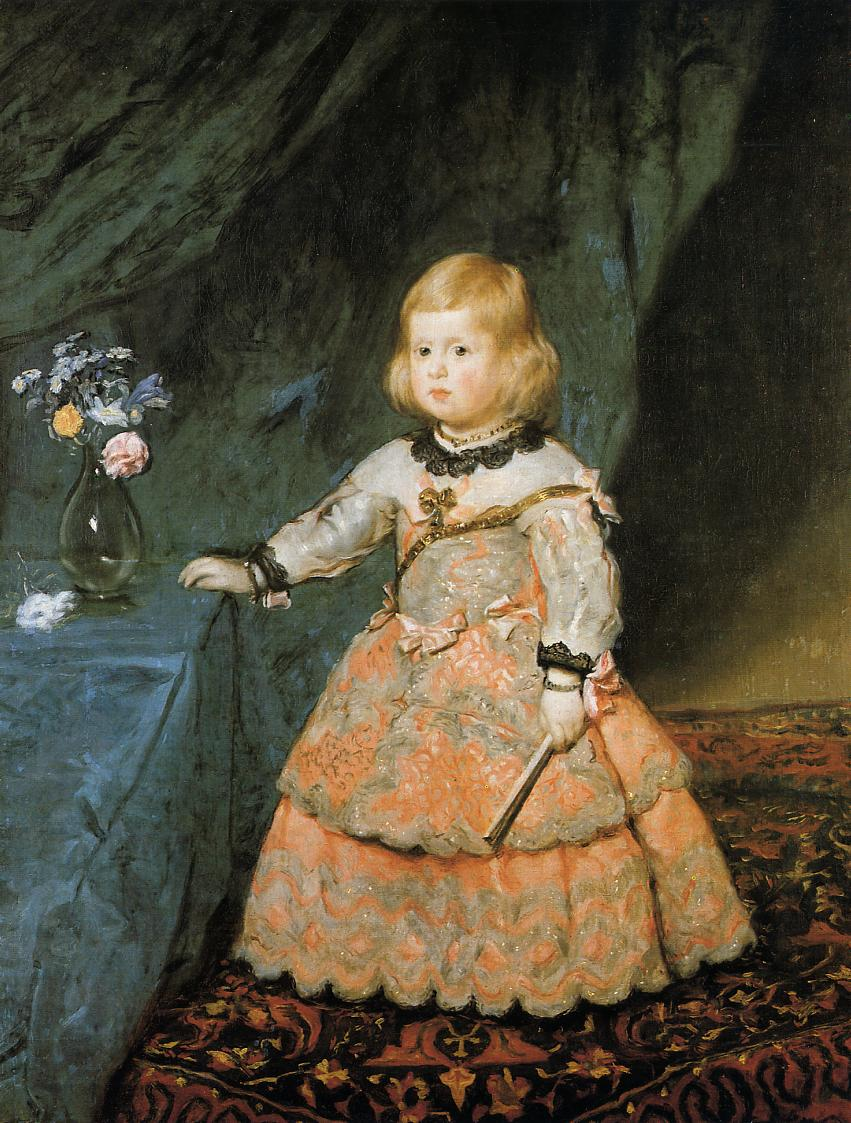
- Artist: Diego Velázquez
- Year: 1653-1654
- Medium: oil on canvas
- Dimensions: 128.5 cm × 100 cm (50.6 in × 39 in)
- Location: Kunsthistorisches Museum, Vienna

Infanta Margarita Teresa in a Peach Dress is an oil on canvas painting by Spanish painter Diego Velázquez, from 1653 to 1654. It is one of five portraits that he painted of Infanta Margaret Theresa of Spain. It is now in the Kunsthistorisches Museum, in Vienna.

== History ==
This was the first of five paintings that Velázquez made of the Infanta Margaret Teresa of Austria, although at first it was believed that it was a portraits was her half-sister, the Infanta Maria Theresa of Spain.

This painting was offered by her father, Philip IV of Spain, to the Viennese court so that her fiancé Leopold I of Habsburg could know how she looked like.

Another version with variants, where the infanta seems somewhat older and her hair looks longer, is kept in the Palacio de Liria in Madrid (Casa de Alba Collection). Traditionally assumed to be an authentic work of Velázquez, it is now believed to have been painted by an assistant.

== Description ==
The painting represents the infanta aged two or three years old. She is standing with her right hand resting on a small table where a glass vase containing roses, lilies and daisies stands. The infanta's left hand holds a closed fan.
