= Eduardo X Arroyo =

Ecuadorian painter

Eduardo X Arroyo (born 1953, Quito, Ecuador) is an Ecuadorian painter.

He studied at Escuela de Artes Decorativas in Madrid and obtained his degree in Interior Design in 1977.

== Exhibitions ==
1981 Galería Altamira, Quito.
1993 Posada de las Artes Kingman, Quito
1996 Galería González Guzmán, Quito
1997 Galería González Guzmán, Quito
1998 Ara Gallery Cultural Center, Coral Gables, USA. Group Exhibition
1999 Galería González Guzmán, Quito
2001 Galería González Guzmán, Quito. Group Exhibition
2002 Posada de las Artes Kingman, Quito
2002 Galería Imaginar, Quito. Homenaje a la amiga Inés Maria Flores. Group Exhibition
2002 No-Salón de Arte Contemporáneo y Descontemporáneo, Quito. Group Exhibition
2002 Galería González Guzmán, Quito. ¨24 Artistas acolitan a Stornaiolo¨. Group Exhibition
2004 Casa de la Cultura Ecuatoriana, Quito. Muestra de Arte Erótico. Group Exhibition
2004 Sala del Cafelibro, Quito
2005 Galería González Guzmán, Quito
2006 Salón de la Plástica Mexicana, “La Plástica Ecuatoriana en México”, México Distrito Federal. Group Exhibition
2006 Mina Álvarez Taller Galería Arte, Quito. “Confluencias I”. Group Exhibition
2006 Casa de la Cultura Ecuatoriana, Salas Kingman, Guayasamín y Miguel de Santiago, Quito. Retrospective Exhibition 1981–2006.
2007 Casa San Lucas, Ramiro Jácome, Eduardo X. Arroyo, Pilar Bustos, José Unda. Group Exhibition
2007 Banco Central del Ecuador, Museo Nahim Isaias, Guayaquil. Retrospective Exhibition 1980–2007.
2007 Galeria de las Artes, Quito. Group Exhibition
2007 Museo Municipal de Arte Moderno, Cuenca. Retrospective Exhibition 1980-2007
