= Jaime Valencia =

Sculptor

- Born: 1916; Quito, Ecuador
- Died: 2010 (aged 93–94)
- Education: Escuela de Bellas Artes
- Known for: Painting, sculpting
- Awards: 3rd prize in the Mariano Arguilera contest in 1957 and the 1st prize the following year

Jaime Valencia (1916–2010) was an Ecuadorian painter and sculptor. He studied art at Escuela de Bellas Artes. He achieved 3rd prize in the Mariano Arguilera contest in 1957 and the 1st prize the following year. His artwork has been exhibited throughout Latin America. Valencia sculpted the principal facade for the Casa de la Cultura Ecuatoriana Benjamin Carrion in Quito. He also sculpted the busts of two former presidents of Ecuador which are located on the corner of Amazonas and George Washington streets in Quito. He was born in Quito.
