= Infanta Margarita in a White and Silver Dress =

Painting by Diego Velázquez

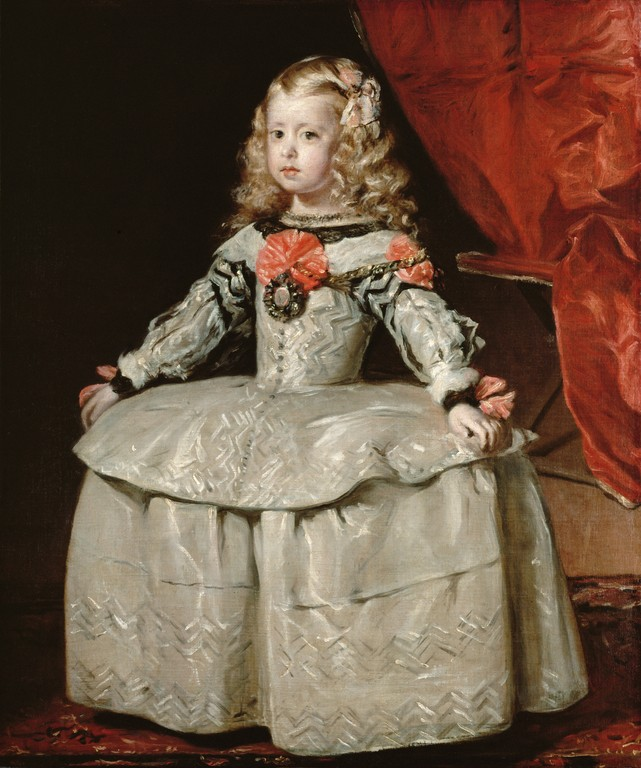
- Artist: Diego Velázquez
- Year: 1656
- Medium: oil on canvas
- Dimensions: 105 cm × 88 cm (41 in × 35 in)
- Location: Kunsthistorisches Museum, Vienna

Infanta Margarita in a White and Silver Dress or Infanta Margarita in a White Dress is a 1656 painting by Diego Velázquez, one of his five portraits of Margaret Theresa of Spain.

It is one of the painter's last works – Martin Warnke argues that it was painted slightly after Las Meninas, which shows Margaret Theresa in a similar white dress. It was one of the paintings sent to Vienna for Leopold I, Margarita's future husband and future Holy Roman Emperor. It thus now hangs in the Kunsthistorisches Museum in Vienna.
