= Ilaló =

Volcano in Ecuador

- Location within Ecuador

Highest point
- Elevation: 3,185 m (10,449 ft)
- Prominence: 609 m (1,998 ft)
- Coordinates: 0°15′48″S 78°25′8″W

Geography
- Country: Ecuador
- Province: Pichincha Province
- Parent range: Andes

Geology
- Rock age: Pleistocene
- Mountain type: Stratovolcano

Ilaló is an eroded stratovolcano located to the southeast of Quito, Ecuador.

A single Potassium-Argon age of 1.62 ± 0.16 million years was obtained from the volcano.
