= Edgar Carrasco Arteaga =

Ecuadorian painter and sculptor

Edgar Carrasco Arteaga (born Cuenca, Ecuador, 1946) is an Ecuadorian painter and sculptor.

== Biography ==
Carrasco's love for art began in childhood, with drawings of animals which eventually won him the Paris Prize. Carrasco lived in Paris for year, during which time he visited museums such as the Louvre and saw exhibitions of the great masters of European art. For several years, he was employed making trophies for the Delta Advertising Awards. He also briefly visited Asia and Russia, exhibiting in Singapore and Japan in 2008.

== Work ==
Carrasco works mainly in copper, which he calls "the legitimate child of the Sun," but also works with bronze, silver and iron, using special techniques such as plating copper pipes with other metals such as silver. Among his most notable works are a mural at the Hotel Cosmos in Bogota; a sculpture of Oswaldo Guayasamín in plaster; and a sculpture of Don Quixote in wrought iron. His works can be seen at the Alliance Francaise de Quito, and the Oswaldo Guayasamín museum.

His latest works include a kinetic sculpture erected in the Paseo de la Juventud Plaza in Machala. The work comprises polished copper pipes protruding at different angles. "Copper interprets light," Carrasco notes. He leaves his works untitled, leaving the viewer to impose their own title.

== Awards and honors ==
- Mariano Aguilera
- II Biennale Hall of Honor
- Premio de Escultura de la Universidad de Cuenca y de la Casa de la Cultura
- Primer Premio Nacional de Artes Plásticas de Quito
- Primer Premio Salón de Octubre (Guayaquil)
