= Oswaldo Moreno =

Ecuadorian painter (1929–2011)

Oswaldo Moreno Heredia
- Born: 1929
- Died: December 3, 2011 (aged 81–82); Quito, Ecuador
- Known for: Painting
- Notable work: Approximately 10,000 artworks

Oswaldo Moreno Heredia (1929 – 3 December 2011) was an Ecuadorian painter. His paintings are in collections in the Americas, Europe, Asia and the Middle East, including El Museo De Arte Moderno del Banco Central, El Museo De La Casa De Cultura, and in the Alianza Francesa Galleries. Moreno was featured in "El Grupo Van - 30 Anos Despues" with eight other Ecuadorian painters. Moreno created around ten thousand works of art located around the world. He died at the age of 82 in Quito, Ecuador of diabetes.
