= Nicolás Kingman =

Ecuadorian journalist, writer and politician

Nicolás Kingman Riofrío (November 18, 1918, Loja – March 19, 2018, Quito) was an Ecuadorian journalist, writer and politician.

== Biography ==
His father, Edward Kingman, moved from Newton, Connecticut, in the United States to coastal Cantón Portovelo in El Oro Province, Ecuador, while working for the "South America Development Company". Edward Kingman worked in the mines of Zaruma and was the second person to have an automobile in Quito (the first was Juan Isaac Navarro). Kingman was the younger brother of the renowned painter Eduardo Kingman. Kingman married Gloria Garcés.

Kingman completed his secondary studies at the Colegio Vicente Rocafuerte of Guayaquil. He has served as a deputy in the Constituent Assembly of 1944, and then in the National Congress of 1948 and 1956 during the presidency of Carlos Julio Arosemena Monroy. He was the General Inspectorate of Ecuador between 1961-1963; the vice director of the Housing Bank between 1964-1968; director of the newspaper La Hora since 1985. He was a founding member of Writers and Artists Union, member of the House of Ecuadorian Culture, and a member of the editorial board of the Library of the Central Bank of Ecuador.

As a teenager he started the first student strike at the Colegio Vicente Rocafuerte, and at the same time began a close friendship with Pedro Jorge Vera and members of the Guayaquil Group, such as Joaquín Gallegos Lara, Demetrio Aguilera Malta, Alfredo Pareja Diezcanseco, José de la Cuadra and Enrique Gil Gilbert.

Kingman is the author of the short story book Comida para locos (Food for the Crazy) (1974), and the novels Dioses, semidioses y astronautas (Gods, Demigods and Astronauts) (1982) and La escoba de la bruja (The Witch's Broom) (2000). Kingman's works have not been translated into English yet.

Kingman was awarded Ecuador's highest honor, The National Prize of Culture "Premio Eugenio Espejo", in 1997.

== Works ==
- Comida para locos (1974)
- Dioses, semidioses y astronautas (1982)
- La escoba de la bruja (2000)
