= List of Ecuadorian women writers =

This is a list of women writers who were born in Ecuador or whose writings are closely associated with that country.

== A ==
- Carmen Acevedo Vega (1913–2006), poet, novelist, short story writer, journalist
- Elysa Ayala (1879–1956), short story writer, painter

== B ==
- Ana Cecilia Blum (born 1972), novelist, journalist
- Veronica Bonilla (born 1962), prolific children's writer, publishes in Spanish and English
- Rosa Borja de Ycaza (1889–1964), playwright, novelist, poet, essayist, feminist
- Aminta Buenaño (born 1958), short story writer, journalist, politician

== C ==
- Hipatia Cárdenas de Bustamante (1889–1972), novelist, poet, journalist, suffragist, feminist
- Fanny Carrión de Fierro (born 1936), poet, critic, essayist, educator
- María Piedad Castillo de Levi (1888—1962), poet, journalist, suffragist
- Luz Argentina Chiriboga (born 1940) Afro-Ecuadorian essayist, poet, novelist
- Mary Corylé (1894–1976), journalist, poet
- Alicia Yánez Cossío (born 1928), poet, novelist, journalist

== E ==
- Ileana Espinel (1933–2001), poet, journalist, magazine editor
- Jenny Estrada (1940–2024), historian, biographer, non-fiction writer, journalist

== F ==
- Carmen Febres-Cordero de Ballén (1829–1893), writer, poet

== G ==
- Karina Galvez (born 1964), Ecuadorian-American poet, writes in Spanish and English

== H ==
- Yanna Hadatty (born 1969), short story writer, essayist
- Catalina de Jesús Herrera (1717–1795), prioress, nun, autobiographer, mystical poet

== I ==
- Edna Iturralde (born 1948), acclaimed children's writer

== L ==
- Violeta Luna (born 1943), poet, novelist, essayist, critic, educator

== M ==
- Nela Martínez (1912–2004), politician, activist, poet, short story writer

== O ==
- Elisa Ortiz de Aulestia (1909–1991), teacher and writer

== R ==
- Cristina Reyes (born 1981), poet, lawyer, and politician
- Sonia Romo Verdesoto, poet, author of Ternura del aire (1963)
- Lupe Rumazo (born 1933), essayist, short story writer, novelist

== T ==
- Doménica Tabacchi (born 1973), politician, journalist
- Mercedes González Tola (1860–1911), poet, playwright and writer of the romanticism movement

== U ==
- Zoila Ugarte de Landívar (1864–1969), journalist, magazine editor, suffragist, feminist

== V ==
- Dolores Veintimilla (1829–1857), poet
- Marieta de Veintemilla (1855–1907), first lady, non-fiction writer
- Raquel Verdesoto (1910–1999), poet, biographer, feminist
- Eugenia Viteri (1928–2023), novelist, anthologist, teacher

== See also ==
- List of women writers
- List of Spanish-language authors
