= Los que se van =

Ecuadorian short story collection (1930)

- Authors: Demetrio Aguilera Malta; Joaquín Gallegos Lara; Enrique Gil Gilbert
- Language: Spanish
- Genre: Social realism; magical realism
- Publisher: Zea y Paladines
- Publication date: 1930
- Publication place: Ecuador

Los que se van is a collection of short stories published in 1930 by Ecuadorian writers Demetrio Aguilera Malta, Joaquín Gallegos Lara, and Enrique Gil Gilbert, members of the so-called Guayaquil Group. The work is considered the most famous short story collection in Ecuadorian literature, and marked a definitive break with the costumbrista literature that had previously dominated the national literary scene.

The collection contains 24 short stories depicting the lives of coastal Ecuadorian peasants. Set in the rural areas of Ecuador's coast, the stories explore the daily struggles of characters who represent the montubio and cholo populations, highlighting their poverty and interactions with family and the land.

The book was published in 1930 by Zea y Paladines in Guayaquil. Upon release, it was met with strong criticism from conservative literary circles, who objected to its crude language and the perceived exaggeration in its narratives. The authors were accused of trying to create international scandal and tarnish the country's image by portraying characters driven by lust, alcohol, or jealousy.

== Style and themes ==
Los que se van is noted for its use of language, narrative techniques, and thematic focus, which marked a departure from costumbrismo that dominated Ecuadorian literature in the 19th and early 20th centuries. The work is widely recognized as a precursor to Latin American social realism and magical realism. The stories in Los que se van are written within the framework of literary realism, a movement that sought to portray social reality through literature. They employ several hallmarks of the realist style, including colloquial language, vivid depictions of everyday life, social critique of marginalized communities, and the use of archetypal characters to represent collective experiences.

The stories in the collection are characterized by their use of colloquial language and an emphasis on oral expression. The authors incorporate regional dialects of cholos and montubios, reproducing phonetic features such as metaplasms (e.g. desgraciao for desgraciado, naide for nadie) to reflect authentic speech. Themes vary across the authors, though unfulfilled desire appears as a central motif throughout the collection. Demetrio Aguilera Malta's stories frequently center on protagonists driven by desire and often include scenes of rape and murder in markedly machista settings. Joaquín Gallegos Lara focuses more on superstition and idealized portrayals of nature, although lust also motivates many of his characters. Enrique Gil Gilbert employs more lyrical language, with some stories exploring the nature of evil and death; the theme of the woman as an unattainable object is also recurrent in his work.

== Publication sequence ==
The collection comprises 24 stories: 8 by each author.

Story	Author
El malo	Enrique Gil Gilbert
El guaraguao	Joaquín Gallegos Lara
El cholo que odió la plata	Demetrio Aguilera Malta
Er sí, ella no	Joaquín Gallegos Lara
El cholo de la atacosa	Demetrio Aguilera Malta
Por guardar el secreto	Enrique Gil Gilbert
El cholo del cuerito e venao	Demetrio Aguilera Malta
La blanca de los ojos de color de luna	Enrique Gil Gilbert
¡Era la mama!	Joaquín Gallegos Lara
El cholo del tribón	Demetrio Aguilera Malta
Lo que son las cosas	Enrique Gil Gilbert
Cuando parió la zamba	Joaquín Gallegos Lara
Juan der diablo	Enrique Gil Gilbert
El tabacazo	Joaquín Gallegos Lara
El cholo que se vengó	Demetrio Aguilera Malta
Los madereros	Joaquín Gallegos Lara
El cholo que se fue pa Guayaquil	Demetrio Aguilera Malta
Montaña adentro	Enrique Gil Gilbert
Al subir el aguaje	Joaquín Gallegos Lara
Tren	Enrique Gil Gilbert
El cholo de las patas e mulas	Demetrio Aguilera Malta
Mardecido "llanto"	Enrique Gil Gilbert
El cholo que se castró	Demetrio Aguilera Malta
La salvaje	Joaquín Gallegos Lara
