= Poets of Elan =

Ecuadorian poets

A group of Ecuadorian poets born between 1905 and 1920 representing the neosymbolism or lyrical vanguard movement. These poets gravitate towards an inner, cerebral lyric, but are also moved by the decisive influence of the social movements growing in the country and the world, specially to the many questions that arise after World War I and the years that followed.

The poets of ELAN are Augusto Sacoto Arias (1907), Atanasio Viteri (1908), Ignacio Lasso (1911), José A. Llerena (1912), Jorge I. Guerrero (1913), Humberto Vacas Gómez (1913), Alejandro Carrión (1915), Joaquín Gallegos Lara (1911–1947), Nela Martínez (1911), Enrique Gil Gilbert (1913 ), Pedro Jorge Vera (1915), Adalberto Ortiz (1914), Nelson Estupiñán Bass (1915). Hugo Larrea Andrade (1907), Rodrigo Pachano Lalama 1910), Carlos Suárez Veintimilla (1911), Jorge Isaac Robayo (1911–1960), Carlos Bazante (1914).

== See also ==
- List of Spanish language poets
