= Alba Calderón =

Ecuadorian social realist painter, leftist activist and feminist

- Born: Alba Calderón Zatizábal; July 27, 1908; Esmeraldas, Ecuador
- Died: 1992 (aged 83–84); Guayaquil, Ecuador
- Occupation: Painter
- Spouse: Enrique Gil Gilbert
- Writing career
- Genre: Social realism

Alba Calderón de Gil (July 27, 1908 – 1992) was an Ecuadorian social realist painter, leftist activist, and feminist. She founded the movement for the recognition of women's rights in Ecuador.

Alba Calderón was born in Esmeraldas and died in Guayaquil.

== Personal life ==
In 1933 Alba Calderón was introduced to the novelist Enrique Gil Gilbert of the "Guayaquil Group" by Demetrio Aguilera Malta. Calderón married Gil Gilbert in 1934. Gil Gilbert's best friend and fellow social realist writer Joaquín Gallegos Lara was the best man at the ceremony.

Calderón and Gil Gilbert had two sons: Enrique Gil Calderon, a choral director, and Antonio Gil Calderon, a doctor and businessman.

== Communist life and exile ==
In 1953 the Communist Party of Ecuador sent Alba Calderón as a delegate to the Third Congress of the International Federation of Women, to fight for peace and the defense of women and children. She then organized the Union of Women of Guayas, for which she was elected Secretary General, while Aurora Estrada was elected its president, and Blanca Arce de Salcedo its vice president. In 1958 she helped numerous Cuban refugees, and traveled to Cuba twice soon after the Cuban Revolution. Between 1961-1963 she was the Provincial Counselor of Guayas during the presidency of Carlos Julio Arosemena Monroy. But during the dictatorship of 1963 the government arrested several leaders and members of the communist party, and Alba Calderon had to go into exile in Chile. Her husband Gil Gilbert, who was a high-ranking member of the communist party, was imprisoned for 15 months, and her son Enrique and his family had to go into hiding. The Union of Women of Guayas got dissolved at this time, but years later its members founded the United Front of Women, with Ana Abad de Monroy as its president, whose purpose was the development of women in the historic framework of Ecuador.

== Artwork ==
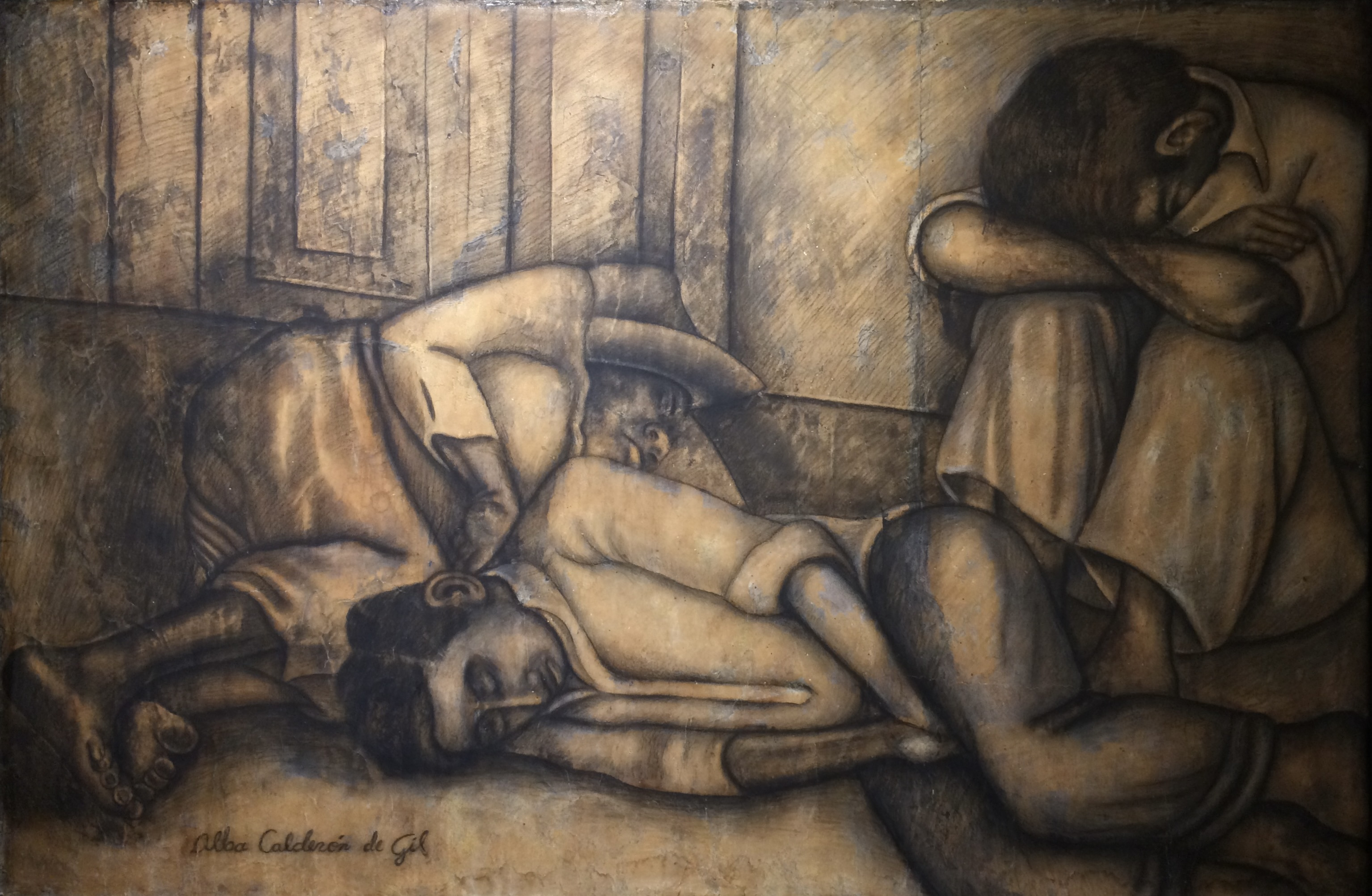
Los desocupados (1937). MuNa, Quito.

Alba Calderón was a social realist artist whose artwork includes paintings, watercolors, drawings and sketches that are usually characterized by the portrayal of everyday conditions of the working classes and the poor of Ecuador. Her works were exhibited in Quito, Lima, Santiago, Caracas, New York City, and Paris.

In 2004 the museum of the Central Bank of Ecuador in Guayaquil acquired some of Calderón's paintings from her son Enrique Gil Calderón. Other paintings can be found at the House of Ecuadorian Culture. Private owners, such as the art critic Juan Hadatty Saltos and Cecilia Hasing, have also lent their private collections for exhibitions.

An exhibition of her work titled 'Polyfonia' was curated by Romina Muñoz within the House of Ecuadorian Culture when she was the head of the National Museum of Ecuador from 2021 to 2023.

One of Calderón's most remarkable and complex paintings is Escogedoras de café (Coffee Pickers) (1939). In this tropical-colored painting, peasants are toiling on a coffee plantation, while a majordomo, with a sheathed machete, oversees. The peasants are portrayed as a collective, individuality does not matter; that is why their faces are not shown or are covered by sombreros.
