= Alfredo Pareja Diezcanseco =

Peruvian writer & historian (1908–1993)

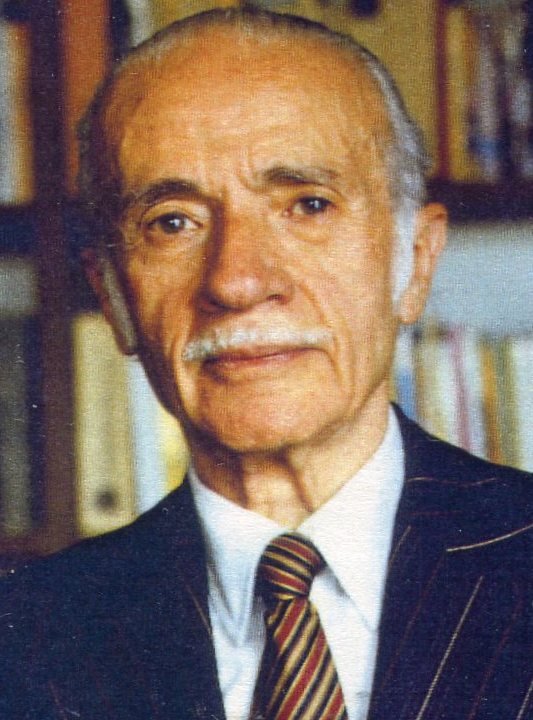
- Pareja in 1990
- Born: October 12, 1908; Guayaquil, Ecuador
- Died: May 1, 1993 (aged 84); Quito, Ecuador
- Occupations: Novelist, essayist, journalist, historian, diplomat
- Writing career
- Genre: Nonfiction

Alfredo Pareja Diezcanseco (October 12, 1908 – May 1, 1993), born Alfredo Pareja y Díez Canseco, was an Ecuadorian novelist, essayist, journalist, historian and diplomat. An innovator of the 20th-century Latin American novel, he was a founding member of the literary Grupo de Guayaquil ("Group of Guayaquil"), which brought a new emphasis to realistic novels.

The government of President Jaime Roldós Aguilera (1979–1981) appointed Pareja as Chancellor of the Republic and he also served as Foreign Minister of Ecuador (1979–1980) and Ambassador to France (1983–1984). His books have not yet been translated into English.

== Biography ==
Pareja was born in Guayaquil on October 12, 1908, the son of Fernando Pareja y Pareja (1862–1919) and of Amalia Diez-Canseco y Coloma (1865–1945), daughter of the former Peruvian President Francisco Diez Canseco y Corbacho and his wife. Pareja had to support his family from the age of 14. He read at night and assisted as a gate listener at the Colegio Vicente Rocafuerte, which was co-ed until 1937. He would monitor student conversations to ensure proper decorum.

Pareja completed his early education in his hometown: primary school at the Colegio San Luis Gonzaga of the Christian Brothers. In 1927 Pareja and Jorge Pérez Concha founded the magazine Voluntad in collaboration with Leopoldo Benites Vinueza, but they published only six issues.

In 1930, Pareja embarked on an adventure in the United States. As a result of the Great Depression, he worked on the New York City docks for a year (his later novel El Muelle (The Pier, 1933) reflects these experiences).

After returning to Ecuador, he received his licenciado from the University of Guayaquil. He became a professor of history and of Spanish and Spanish American literature at Universidad Laica Vicente Rocafuerte de Guayaquil. He also served as a Superintendent of Secondary Education and as a deputy of Guayas Province.

In 1934 he married Mercedes Cucalón Concha, a second cousin and niece of Carlos Concha Torres and his wife. They had three children together: Cecilia, Jorge and Francisco.

== Political issues ==
As an intellectual who was attracted to socialist ideas, Pareja sometimes was at cross purposes with the ruling governments in Ecuador.

During the dictatorship of Federico Páez (1935–1937), Pareja was incarcerated and ultimately exiled to Chile. There he worked for the Ercilla Publishing House. Returning to Ecuador, he became a member of the Assembly, but was jailed again by the regime of President Aurelio Mosquera Narvaez. (This 30-day detainment formed the basis of his novel, Hombres sin tiempo).

In 1944 Pareja was appointed as Ecuador's chargé d'affaires in Mexico. In 1945 he became a special representative for the United Nations Relief and Rehabilitation Administration (UNRRA) in Washington, D.C. He later served in Montevideo and Buenos Aires, coordinating for the governments of Mexico, Central American nations, Argentina, Uruguay, and Paraguay.

Between August 1979 and July 1980, during the government of President Jaime Roldós Aguilera, Pareja was appointed to the post of Minister of Foreign Affairs. During the rule of Roldós's successor, President Osvaldo Hurtado, he served as Permanent Delegate to UNESCO and Ambassador to Paris (1983–1984).

After retirement, Pareja dedicated his time to historical research. He died in Quito on 1 May 1993.

== Literary works and political stance ==
Pareja was born into a conservative family but became part of a "socialist generation" in Ecuador. He lived through considerable political turmoil in the 1920s and concluded that his country's salvation lay on the left side of the political spectrum. He denied, however, being a "left-winger".

He insisted that he did not want to use his fiction as an instrument of propaganda. Rather, he sought to simply and directly depict social conditions that called for redress, while denouncing those in power who were guilty of corruption and injustice. His first novel, La casa de los locos (1929), satirized Ecuadorian politics. He attacked so many living people that publication was considerably delayed. Pareja attested to the strong influence of the Mexican writer and politician José Vasconcelos. Other major literary influences included the Greek classics, Balzac, Dostoievski, Thomas Mann, Will Durant and Arnold Toynbee. Some critics have also detected the influence of Freud, Ehrenburg, Gide and Proust.

Pareja's cycle of narrative fiction was marked by realism and a strong connection with the history of his country (El muelle ["The Pier"], 1933; Hombres sin tiempo ["Men Without Time"], 1941; Las tres ratas [The Three Rats], 1944). Having established a reputation as a writer both inside and outside of Ecuador, in 1944 he published an important biographical novel, The Barbaric Bonfire, about the actions and historical circumstances surrounding the life and death of General Eloy Alfaro.

He started a new cycle of novels n 1956 with La advertencia (“The Warning") and continued with El aire y los recuerdos ("Air and Memories"; 1959) and Los poderes omnímodos ("All-embracing Powers"; 1964). He was writing about the evolution of Ecuadorian society since 1925. Subsequently, he published the novel Las pequeñas estaturas ("Small Statures"; 1970). He also wrote essays: "Thomas Mann and the New Humanism" (1956) and "Essays on Essays" (1981). (To date his works have not been translated into English.)

Pareja maintained a long association with the famous "Guayaquil Group" of Ecuadorian writers (José de la Cuadra, Joaquín Gallegos Lara, Demetrio Aguilera Malta, Enrique Gil Gilbert). He also associated with writers from other countries: Jorge Luis Borges, Juan David García Bacca, John Dos Passos, Arnold J. Toynbee, Julio Cortázar, Alvaro Mutis, Jorge Enrique Adoum, Benjamin Carrión, Oswaldo Guayasamín and his nephew Miguel Donoso Pareja. The only biography about Pareja was written by the journalist and writer Francisco Febres Cordero.

Pareja maintained periodic correspondence with American writer John Steinbeck.

President Galo Plaza Lasso worked with Pareja in educational projects after World War II around the globe, mostly in Central and South America.

== Accolades and positions ==
- Medalla de la Fundación Internacional Eloy Alfaro La Habana 1944
- Medalla al Mérito Literario Municipio de Guayaquil, 1972
- Premio Nacional Eugenio Espejo ("Eugenio Espejo National Award"), Ecuador's most important literary award, given for a life's work, 1979.
- Gran Oficial de la orden al Mérito del Ecuador
- Gran Cruz de la Orden al Mérito del Ecuador
- Gran Cruz de Order of Isabella the Catholic
- Grand Croix de Order of the Crown (Belgium)
- Gran Cruz de la Order of the Sun (Peru)
- Gran Cruz da Orden de Rio Branco
- Gran Cruz de la Orden Jóse Cecilio del Valle
- Légion d'honneur, June 1992. Received the honor for presiding the Bicentennial of the French Revolution Committee.
- Title of Doctor Honoris Causa, University of Guayaquil, 1986
- Member, National Academy of History, June 1989
- Member, Real Academia Española
- Member, Anthropological and Geography Institute of Ecuador
- Member, Casa de la Cultura Ecuatoriana
- Member, Ecuadorean Academy of History
- Member, Center of Literary Studies, University of Guayaquil
- History advisor, Pan American Institute of Geography and History, Ecuador.
- Professor of Cultural History, Universidad Central del Ecuador
- Subdirector and Professor of American History and Political Theory, International Institute of Politic studies, San José, Costa Rica.
- Full Professor of Latin America History and International Relations, Graduate School of the University of Florida, USA
- Pensamiento Politico of the Republicas Grancolombianas
- Guggenheim Fellowship
- Full Professor of Latin American Political Problems and International Relations, Advanced Center of Studies, Graduate School, University of Miami, United States.
- Professor of History Research, Universidad Central del Ecuador
- Full Professor in Foreign Literature, Pontificia Universidad Católica del Ecuador, Ecuador
- Cátedra Laronque Tinker, Graduate School, University of Texas, Literature and Politics in the Countries of the Grupo Andino.
- Courses and conferences at the University of Texas, University of New Mexico, Albuquerque and at the Universidad de Puerto Rico.

== Legacy ==
- Pareja was father-in-law to the noted ethnomusicologist Gerard Béhague (1937-2005).

== Selected works ==
=== Novels ===
- La casa de los locos (Guayaquil, 1929)
- La señorita Ecuador (Guayaquil, 1930)
- Río arriba (1931)
- El muelle (Guayaquil, 1933)
- La Beldaca (Santiago, 1935)
- Baldomera (Santiago, 1938)
- Hechos y hazañas de don Balón de Baba y su amigo don Inocente Cruz (Buenos Aires, 1939)
- Hombres sin tiempo (Buenos Aires, 1941)
- Las tres ratas (Buenos Aires, 1944), made into the Argentine film of the same name in 1946.
- La advertencia (Buenos Aires, 1956)
- El aire y los recuerdos (Buenos Aires, 1959)
- Los poderes omnímodos (Buenos Aires, 1964)
- Las pequeñas estaturas (Madrid, 1970)
- La manticora (Buenos Aires, 1974)

=== Editor, collection of folk poetry ===
- El entenao (Guayaquil, 1991)

=== Short stories ===
- Los gorgojos (Quito, 1954)

=== Essays ===
- Breve historia del Ecuador (1946)
- Historia del Ecuador (1954)
- La lucha por la democracia en el Ecuador (Quito, 1956)
- Thomas Mann y el nuevo humanismo (Quito, 1956)
- El Ecuador de Eloy Alfaro (1966)
- Historia de la República: El Ecuador desde 1830 a Nuestros días (2 vols.; Guayaquil: Cromograph, 1974)
- Las Instituciones y la Administración en la Real Audiencia de Quito (Quito, 1975)
- Ecuador: de la prehistoria à la conquista española (Quito, 1978)
- Ecuador: la República de 1830 a nuestros días (Quito, 1979)
- Ensayos de Ensayos (Quito, 1981)
- Notas de un viaje a China (Quito, 1986)

=== Biographies ===
- La hoguera bárbara – Vida de Eloy Alfaro (Mexico, 1944), a biography of Ecuadorian president Eloy Alfaro.
- Vida y leyenda de Miguel de Santiago (Mexico, 1952), a biography of Ecuadorian painter Miguel de Santiago.

Alfredo Pareja is included in the following anthologies:

- El nuevo relato ecuatoriano (Quito, 1951)
- Antología básica del cuento ecuatoriano (Quito, 1998)

=== Articles ===
- Pareja Diezcanseco, Alfredo (1989), Entry: "Juan Montalvo (1832-1889)"; In Solé, Carlos A (Editor in Chief) and María Isabel Abreu (Associate Editor), Latin American Writers – Volume 1; New York: Charles Scribner's Sons, 3 volumes.
