= Jorge Pérez Concha =

Ecuadorian historian, biographer, writer and diplomat

- Born: June 5, 1908; Guayaquil, Ecuador
- Died: April 1, 1995 (aged 86); Guayaquil, Ecuador
- Occupations: Historian; writer; biographer; diplomat
- Spouse: María Pesantes García
- Writing career
- Notable awards: Premio Eugenio Espejo (1989)

Jorge Pérez Concha (June 5, 1908 in Guayaquil – April 1, 1995 in Guayaquil) was an Ecuadorian historian, biographer, writer, and diplomat.

He wrote biographies of Eloy Alfaro, Luis Vargas Torres, and his uncle Carlos Concha Torres, among others.

He was awarded Ecuador's top National Prize the "Premio Eugenio Espejo" in 1989 in the Culture category.

== Biography ==
Jorge Pérez Concha was born in Guayaquil, Ecuador on June 5, 1908. His father was Dr. Federico Pérez Aspiazu, and his mother was Teresa Concha Torres. His father died in 1919, and he went to live at a relative's hacienda in the north of Quito.

In 1926 he and Demetrio Aguilera Malta published a book of poems and prose titled "Primavera Interior" (Interior Spring), which contained 18 of his own poems, and 21 stories by Aguilera Malta. In 1927 Pérez Concha and Alfredo Pareja Diezcanseco founded the magazine "Voluntad" in collaboration with Leopoldo Benites Vinueza, but they published only six issues. In 1929 Pérez Concha and Espinel Hector Mendoza founded the first commercial advertising agency in Guayaquil, and it worked for several years until they had to close it down due to the severe economic crisis of the 1930s.

In 1939 he met and married María Pesantes García with whom he had children.

In 1942 he won the National Biographies Contest with his book "Eloy Alfaro, su vida y su obra" (Eloy Alfaro, His Life and His Work) hosted by the Ecuadorian government to mark the centenary of the birth of Eloy Alfaro. In 1958 he was appointed the chief of the Guayaquil Branch of the Ecuadorian House of Culture and became its president on February 17, 1962. In 1960 he became an elected member of the Advisory Board of the Ministry of Foreign Affairs. At this time he was also the head of the Municipal Library. In 1962 he was awarded the Grand Cross of the National Order of Merit by the Ecuadorian President Carlos Julio Arosemena Monroy.

Between 1973-1979 he was a guest speaker at the National Higher Education Institute (Instituto de Altos Estudios Nacionales). In 1974 he was a member of the delegation to the 15th Meeting of Consultation of Ministers of Foreign Affairs of the Organization of American States (OAS), held in Quito. Between 1976-1979 he was the vice-president of the Foreign Advisory Board. In 1977 the University of Guayaquil conferred to him the honorary degree Doctor Honoris Causa. In 1978 he attended the 33rd Session of the UN General Assembly in New York.

== Ambassadorship to Cuba ==
In 1979 he was appointed Ecuador's ambassador to Cuba. Ecuador and Cuba had not had an exchange of ambassadors since their relationship was ruptured in 1963. He traveled to Havana to assume his post as ambassador, and then on Friday, February 13, 1984, a group of fourteen people, of varying ages and genders (even children), stormed the Ecuadorian embassy in Cuba to seek asylum. They held the Ecuadorian ambassador, officials and other employees hostage. The incident received global attention. In response, the Cuban government took a strong stance, and turned off water and energy to the building, cordoned off the block, and emptied all the neighboring buildings, and deployed a large number of soldiers to the area. The Cuban government only allowed a minimal amount of food that the Ecuadorian diplomats had to share with the assailants. After a week, and wanting to avoid a fatal outcome, the Ecuadorian government sent Jaime Moncayo Garcia and Cornelio Merchan to negotiate. After long discussions with the Cuban government and the assailants, they surrendered on Friday, February 20, with the condition that the Ecuadorian government would oversee a fair trial. But the next day, it was learned that not only had they been tortured but also sentenced to death in a summary trial. Ambassador Pérez Concha immediately intervened, and explained to Fidel Castro, that the death penalty was abolished in Ecuador in 1902, and that its application in this case would hurt the recently re-established relationship between Ecuador and Cuba. Fidel Castro then commuted all of the death sentences to 30 years imprisonment. Owing to the breach in agreement (that the assailants would receive a fair trial), Pérez Concha returned to Ecuador, and the Ecuadorian government did not appoint another ambassador to Cuba for a while. The foreign ministry then offered Pérez Concha the ambassadorship in Portugal, but he turned it down for a post in the Ministry of Foreign Affairs in Guayaquil with the "Ambassador" title.

== Works ==
- "Historia Diplomática y Naval de la Provincia Libre de Guayaquil" (1994)
- "Páginas de Historia Ecuatoriana" (1990)
- "De la Goleta Alcance al cañonero Calderón" (1987)
- "Un luchador incorruptible" (1987)
- "1.910. La Movilización integral del Ecuador" (1988) (Its second edition was titled: "Frontera Marítima del Ecuador siglo XX")
- "Frente Externo" (1985)
- "Visión Internacional de Eloy Alfaro" (1982)
- "Derecho Territorial Ecuatoriano" (1979)
- "Política Internacional Contemporánea" (1972)
- "La Invasión peruana y el protocolo de Río de Janeiro ante el Derecho Internacional Americano" (1963)
- "Eloy Alfaro ante el Derecho Internacional Americano" (1959)
- "Ensayo Histórico - Crítico de las relaciones diplomáticas del Ecuador con los estados limítrofes" (editions: 1958, 1959, 1965, 1979)
- "Eloy Alfaro, su vida y su obra" (1942)
- "Vargas Torres, fragmentos de la vida del héroe" (1936)
- "El Ecuador ante el problema amazónico" (1932)
- "Guayaquil entre Colombia y el Perú" (1932)
