= El cholo que se castró =

Ecuadorian short story

- Short story by Demetrio Aguilera Malta
- Language: Spanish
- Genres: Magical realism; costumbrismo

Publication
- Publication date: 1930
- Publication place: Ecuador
- Series: Los que se van

"El cholo que se castró" is a short story by Ecuadorian writer Demetrio Aguilera Malta, published in 1930 as part of the short story collection Los que se van. The plot follows the story of Nicasio Yagual, a cholo who, throughout his life, has committed rapes and murders driven by lust, but ultimately reflects on his actions and decides to take extreme measures to end his desires.

Like the other stories in Los que se van, the narrative is written in a colloquial and raw language and focuses on the lives of montubio and cholo characters from rural coastal Ecuador. Some academic interpretations identify in the story elements that foreshadow what would later become the Latin American artistic movement of magical realism.

== Plot ==
The story begins with Nicasio Yagual, the protagonist, attempting to convince a woman to have sex with him. When she refuses, Yagual sets fire to the boat they are on, which allows him to corner her and accomplish his goal. Over the course of his life, Yagual had committed similar acts, such as killing his cousin's father in a machete duel after being forced to marry her due to sexually abusing her, or raping and murdering the wife of the estate owner he worked for after obsessing over her for a long time.

One day, Yagual hears a rumor about a warrior woman known as La Peralta who fought men with machetes and lived by her own rules. He seeks her out and challenges her to a machete duel with the condition that the winner can do whatever they want with the other. Yagual defeats La Peralta but refuses to have sex with her after experiencing an epiphany about the crimes he has committed and repenting. He concludes that his abuses stemmed from his lust and decides to castrate himself to end his sexual urges. La Peralta later finds Yagual's corpse; he has died from bleeding after mutilating himself.

== Style ==
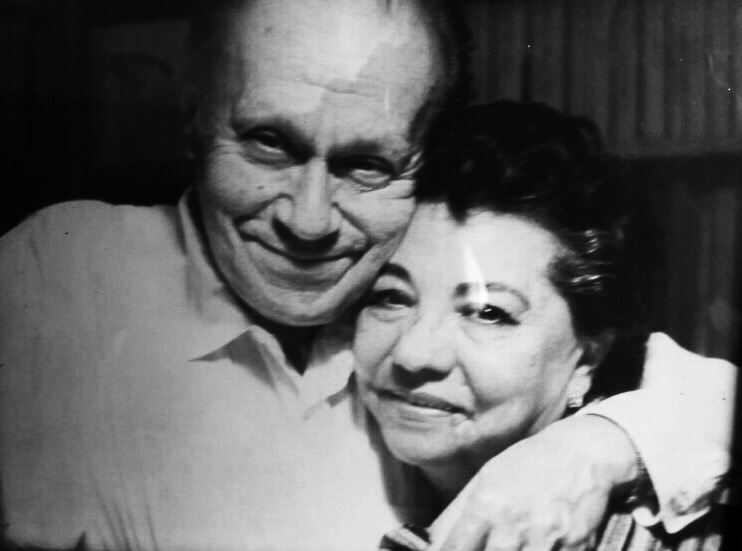
Demetrio Aguilera Malta with his wife, writer Velia Márquez

According to American academic Kenneth Wishnia and Ecuadorian scholar María Helena Barrera, "El cholo que se castró" includes stylistic elements that place it among the forerunners of magical realism, a style Malta would later adopt more fully in his novel Siete lunas y siete serpientes (1970). Wishnia and Barrera highlight in particular the use of anthropomorphic descriptions of objects and animals, such as shrimp or mangrove trees that "laughed out loud", or "stones that seemed to walk". Unlike other similar works of the period, Malta introduces these elements without providing a logical narrative explanation, which according to Wishnia, represented a paradigm shift in Latin American literary realism.

As in the rest of the stories in Los que se van, the narrative explores the lives of cholo and montubio characters through a raw and direct style, filled with spelling distortions. Jorge Enrique Adoum described this as "a new, shameless, insolent, even terrorist language" that broke with the costumbrista literary model that had prevailed in Ecuadorian literature since the 19th century. Another trait is the inclusion of graphic descriptions bordering on tremendismo, as the story's title itself demonstrates; or the repetition of words or sounds to reproduce the characters' orality, as seen in the following excerpt:

The flame turned red. A strange flame that moved through the hut. That clung to the roof. That reached the sails and the masts. That rose defiantly over the sea's solitude.

Structurally, the story is divided into four parts and twenty-six scenes. Unlike other works by the author that follow a linear narrative, the story begins in medias res.
