= Remigio Crespo Toral =

Ecuadorian writer (1860-1939)

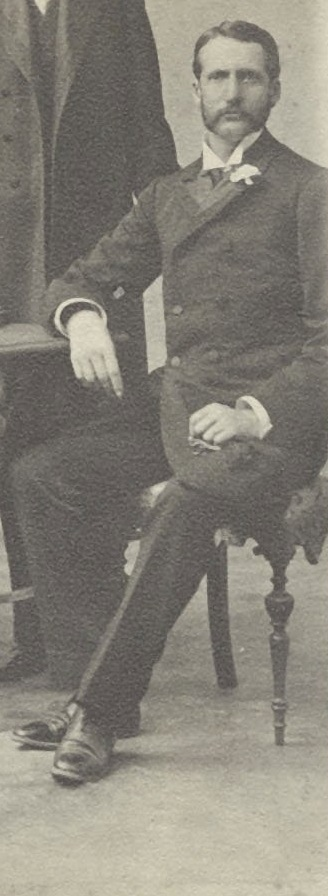
Remigio Crespo Toral in 1906

Remigio Crespo Toral (August 4, 1860 – July 8, 1939) was an Ecuadorian writer, poet, and politician from Cuenca.

== Biography ==
Born in Cuenca, Ecuador, on August 4, 1860, into a well-known family of the region, Crespo Toral went to high school in the Seminary College of Cuenca, from 1873 to 1877, the year in which he entered the University of Cuenca, to study law and thus obtain a law degree, which he earned in 1886.

That same year he married Elvira Vega García (1868–1965), with whom he had ten children. He was President of the Chamber of Deputies in 1888. In 1894 he was Director of Studies of Azuay Province. In the 1880s, he began his journalistic career, writing under the pseudonym "Stein". In 1905, President Leónidas Plaza Gutiérrez appointed him lawyer of the Republic, to defend Ecuador in its diplomatic conflict with Peru.

In 1909, in the centennial of the first cry of independence, Crespo Toral published a book titled Cien años de emancipación. In 1913, he participated in the foundation of the Banco del Azuay (first bank in Cuenca) led by the prominent businessman Federico Malo Andrade.

In 1917, he was crowned national poet, by decree of the President Alfredo Baquerizo Moreno, in the Central Park of Cuenca. This was a very important ceremony, which was attended by the entire city, including senior officials like President Baquerizo Moreno, the Ambassadors of the United States, Belgium, Chile, Peru, among others.

In 1919, he founded, with Alfonso Moreno Mora, "La Fiesta de la Lira", which was a literary contest, held just outside the city, in quiet countryside land. In 1925, he was appointed Rector of the University of Cuenca (where he studied five decades before), holding this post until his death in Cuenca, on July 8, 1939.

== Works ==
- Últimos pensamientos de Bolívar (1889)
- Canto a Sucre (1897)
- Mi Poema (1898)
- Cien años de emancipación (1909)
- América y España (1909)
- La Leyenda de Hernán (1917).
