= José Antonio Campos =

Ecuadorian writer and journalist

José Antonio Campos (1868–1939) was an Ecuadorian writer and journalist. He used the pseudonym Jack the Ripper in his newspaper reports.

Born in the port of Guayaquil, Ecuador, Campos studied at the Colegio San Vicente del Guayas. At the age of 17, he left home and boarded the Chilean navy ship "Pilcomayo", where he remained on board for several months. Upon his return to Guayaquil, he married Mercedes María Morlás.

He began his journalism career in 1887, at the humorous weekly El Marranillo. He specialized in "costumbrista" descriptions of life on the coast, and he was a witness to the Great Fire of Guayaquil of 1896. He wrote for many outlets, among them El Telégrafo, Grito del Pueblo, El Cóndor, El Tiempo, El Independiente, El Guante, América Libre, El Telégrafo, El Globo Literario, El Grito del Pueblo Ecuatoriano, Municipal Gazette, etc. He ended his career at El Universo where he rose to the post of editor-in-chief.

He published the novel Dos amores in 1899. Los crímenes de Galápagos and Crónica del gran incendio de Guayaquil de 1869 appeared in 1904. In 1906 and 1907 he published Rayos catódicos and Fuegos fatuos, wherein he collected his best articles. In 1920 he published America libre. Later, he was cited as a key inspiration by the Grupo de Guayaquil.

He died in Guayaquil in 1939.

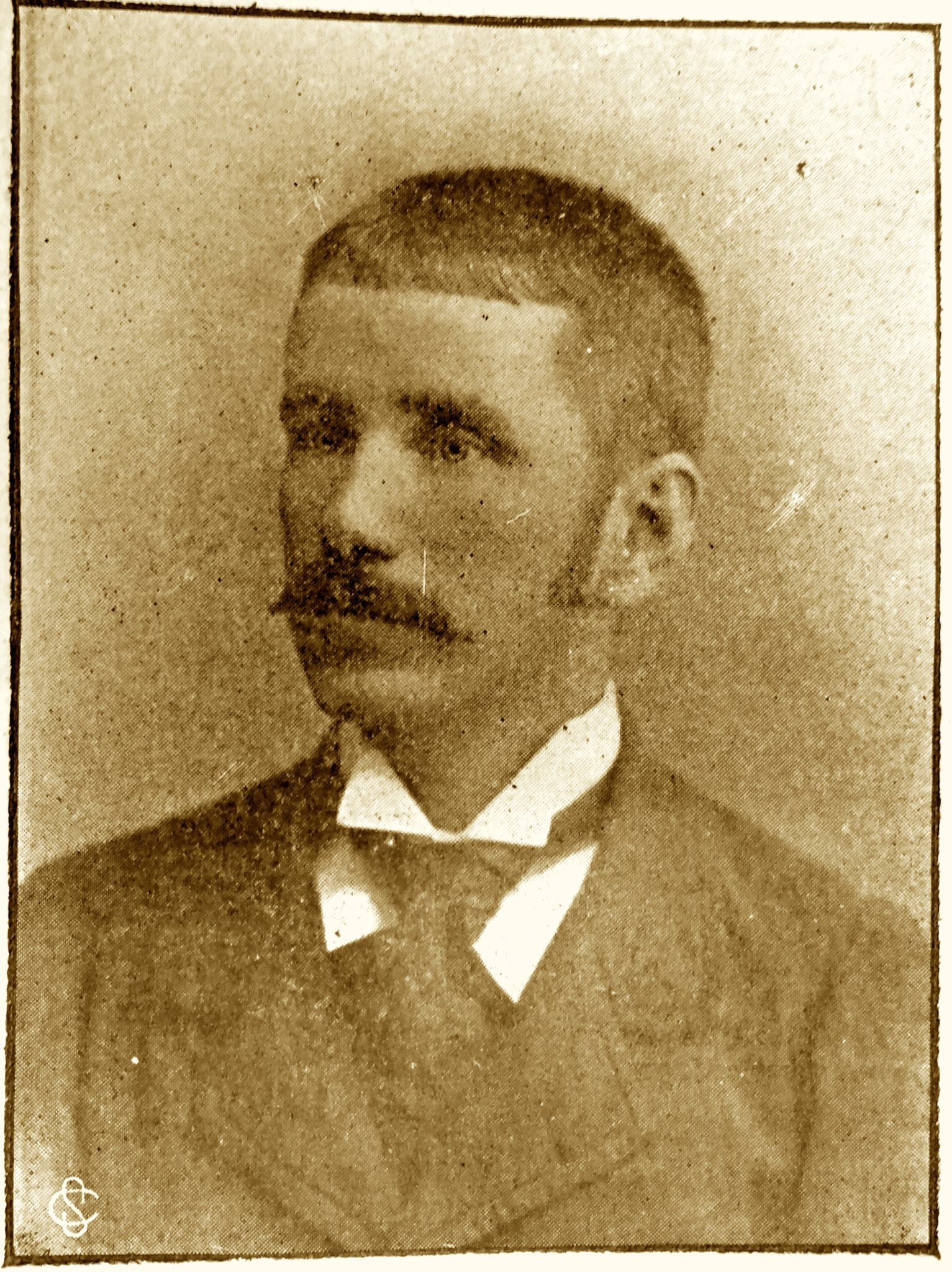
José Antonio Campos, was an Ecuadorian writer and journalist.
