= Elysa Ayala =

Ecuadorian writer and painter (1879–1956)

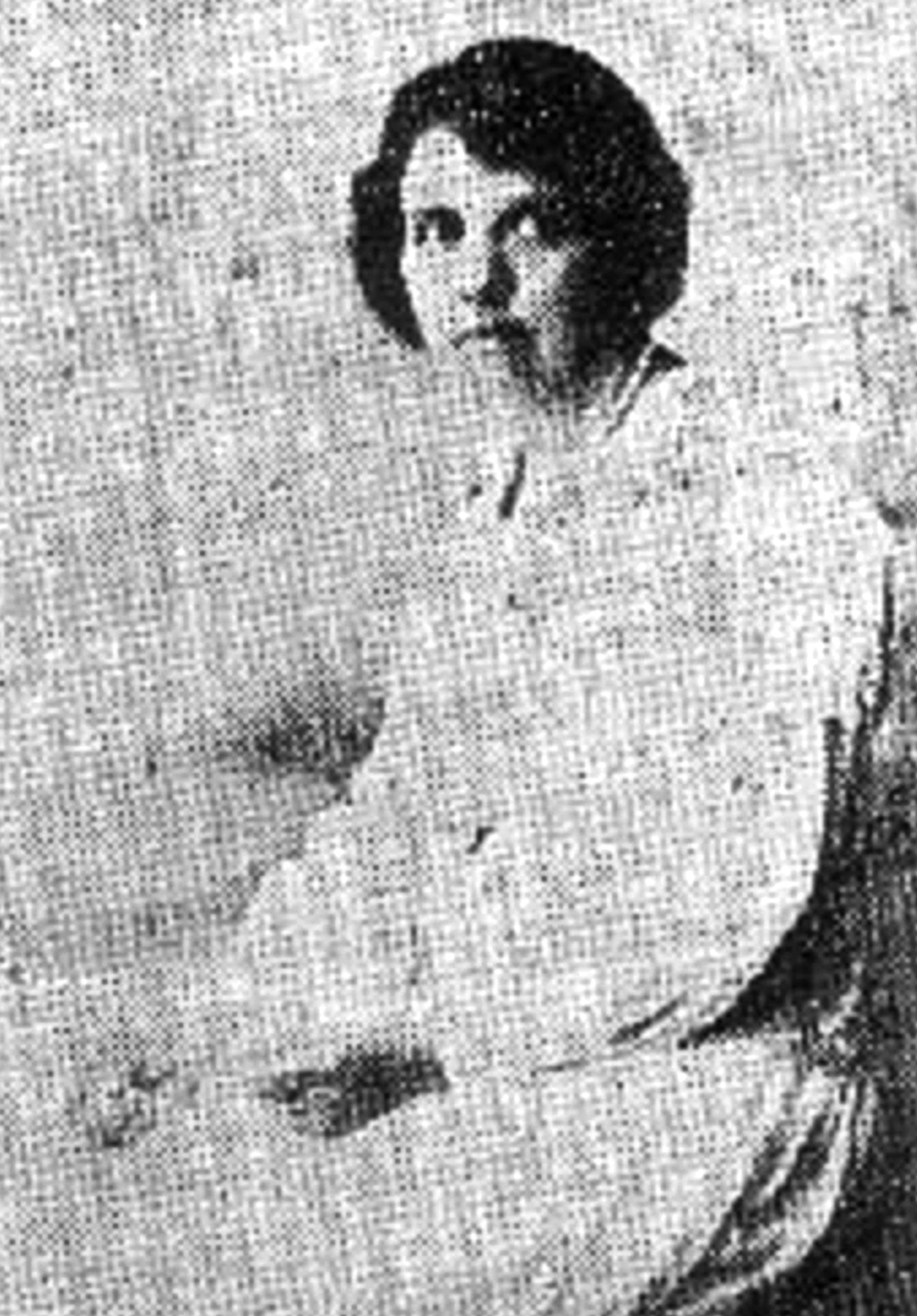
- Ayala in 1918
- Born: Elysa Ayala González; February 1879 Guayaquil, Ecuador
- Died: 1956 (aged 76–77)
- Occupation: Writer; painter
- Education: Colegio de la Inmaculada
- Genre: Short stories
- Literary movement: Guayaquil Group

Elysa Ayala González (February 1879, Guayaquil – 1956) was an Ecuadorian short story writer and painter, known for being the first Ecuadorian to write short stories which transcended the Costumbrismo genre.

== Biography ==
Ayala was born in February 1879 in Guayaquil to Arcadio Ayala, a physician and chemist. In 1887, the Ayala family moved to Los Ríos Province where she received a good education.

In 1894, aged 15, Ayala published her first short story "La Maldición" in America magazine. Ayala's short stories were later published in Ecuador in El Telégrafo, El Guante, Patria, Nuevos Horizontes and from 1917 onwards in La Ilustración. Ayala continued to publish across the Hispanosphere, with her short stories appearing in newspapers and journals in Argentina (Nubes Rosadas and Revista Argentina), Chile (Sucesos and El Nacional), Cuba (Cosmos and Heroes), Spain (La Voz Valenciana) and Uruguay (¡Adelante!).

Following her father's death, Ayala returned to Guayaquil and studied painting at Colegio de la Inmaculada. The first in Ecuadorian to write short stories which transcended the Costumbrismo genre, Ayala used modern narrative structures A member of the Guayaquil Group, Ayala wrote about the oppression of the Montubios people.

Ayala died in 1956.

== Publications ==
=== Posthumous anthologies ===
- Ansaldo Briones, Cecilia, ed. (1993). Cuento contigo: antología del cuento ecuatoriano (in Spanish) (1 ed.). Guayaquil; Quito: Universidad Católica de Santiago de Guayaquil; Universidad Andina Simón Bolívar.
- Ayala González, Elysa (1997). "Elysa Ayala González". In Donoso Pareja, Miguel (ed.). Antologia De Narradoras Ecuatorianas. Quito: Libresa. pp. 93–116. ISBN 978-9978803912.
- Viteri, Eugenia, ed. (2001). Antología básica del cuento ecuatoriano. Quito.
