= Raquel Verdesoto =

Ecuadorian writer, poet, teacher, feminist, and activist

- Born: Ana María Raquel Verdesoto Salgado; November 16, 1910; Ambato, Ecuador
- Died: May 27, 1999 (aged 88); Quito, Ecuador
- Occupations: Poet, Writer, Teacher
- Writing career
- Notable work: Sin mandamientos (1934)
- Notable awards: Juan Leon Mera Award (2000)

Raquel Verdesoto Salgado de Romo Dávila (November 16, 1910 in Ambato – May 27, 1999 in Quito) was an Ecuadorian writer, poet, teacher, feminist, and activist.

== Biography ==
Her parents were Francisco Verdesoto Murillo and Lucila Salgado Hidalgo, she earned a teaching degree from the Manuela Cañizares Normal School. She published her first book of poetry Sin mandamientos (English: Without Commandments) in 1934, which scandalized Ecuadorian society at the time. She majored in literature at the Central University of Ecuador, and earned a doctorate in education science. Besides her poetry, she is also known for her biographical works.

As a feminist activist, she took part in the founding of the Ecuadorian Feminist Alliance in 1938 together with Virginia Larenas, Luisa Gómez de la Torre, Matilde Hidalgo and Nela Martínez.

She was married to a professor named Miguel Ángel Romo Dávila.

In the year 2000 (post mortem) the city of Ambato honored her with the Juan Leon Mera Award for her contribution to Ecuadorian literature. The medal was presented to one of her daughters by the Ecuadorian President Gustavo Noboa Bejarano.

== Works ==
Poetry

- Sin Mandamientos (1934).
- Labios en Llamas (1936).
- Recogí de la Tierra (1977).
- Ésta Fábula (inédito).
- Del Profundo Regreso (inédito).
- Patio de Recreo (inédito).

Biography

- Serie de Microbiografías de Ecuatorianos Ilustres (Ambato: Imprenta Municipal, 1949).
- Juan Montalvo, fusta de las tiranías, 1832-1889 (1949).
- Atahualpa: Raíz auténtica de la nacionalidad ecuatoriana, 1497-1533 (1949).
- Rumiñahui: El defensor heroico del reino (1949).
- Juan Pio Montúfar, marqués de Selva Alegre, primer presidente de la Junta Revolucionaria de Quito 1762-1822 (1949).
- Manuela Sáenz Tomo I y II (Quito: Editorial Casa de la Cultura Ecuatoriana, 1963).
