= José de la Cuadra =

Ecuadorian writer (1903–1941)

- Born: José de la Cuadra y Vargas; 3 September 1903; Guayaquil, Ecuador
- Died: 27 February 1941 (aged 37); Guayaquil, Ecuador
- Occupation: Writer
- Writing career
- Genre: social realism
- Notable works: La Tigra (1932), Los Sangurimas (1934)

José de la Cuadra (September 3, 1903 – February 27, 1941) was an Ecuadorian social realist writer, whose short stories are among the most important in Ecuadorian literature.

== Biography ==
De la Cuadra was born in Guayaquil on September 3, 1903. His father was Vicente de la Cuadra y Vayas and his mother was Ana Victoria Vargas y Jiménez.

He had an LL.D. from the University of Guayaquil and worked as a diplomat in Argentina and Uruguay.

De la Cuadra was part of the "Guayaquil Group" and wrote many essays, novels, articles and above all, short stories. The "Guayaquil Group" was one of the most recognized literary groups in Ecuador in 1930-1940, which also included the writers Enrique Gil Gilbert, Demetrio Aguilera Malta, Joaquín Gallegos Lara and Alfredo Pareja Diezcanseco.

Some of his works have been filmed by Ecuadorian directors and translated into several languages, including La Tigra and Los Sangurimas.

He died in Guayaquil on February 27, 1941 of a massive brain hemorrhage at the age of 37

== Works ==
- Olga Catalina (Id. Id., 1925)
- El sabor de la locura (Id. Id., 1925)
- Perlita Lila (Id. Id., 1925)
- Oro de sol (Guayaquil: El Telégrafo, 1925)
- Horno (Guayaquil: Talleres de la Sociedad Filantrópica, 1932)
- Sueño de una noche de Navidad (Guayaquil: Artes Gráficas Senefelder, 1930)
- Repisas (Guayaquil: Artes Gráficas Senefelder, 1931)
- El amor que dormía (1930)
- Madrecita falsa (1923)
- La vuelta de la locura (Madrid: Revista Literaria Novelas y Cuentos, 1932)
- Guásinton: relatos y crónicas (Quito: Talleres Gráficos de Educación, 1938)
- Los Sangurimas (Madrid: Cenit, 1934)
- 12 siluetas (Quito: Ed. América, 1934)
- El montuvio ecuatoriano (Buenos Aires: Imán, 1937)
- Obras Completas de José de la Cuadra (Quito: Casa de la Cultura, 1958)
- Los monos enloquecidos (Quito: Casa de la Cultura Ecuatoriana, 1951)
