= María Helena Barrera =

- Born: 1971 (age 53–54); Pelileo, Ecuador
- Education: Central University of Ecuador; University of Montpellier; Grenoble Alpes University; Franklin Pierce Law Center
- Occupation(s): Lawyer, writer, researcher
- Spouse: Kanishka Agarwala (m. 2001)
- Awards: Aurelio Espinosa Pólit Prize (2010)

María Helena Barrera Agarwal (born 1971) is an Ecuadorian lawyer, writer, and researcher based in Brooklyn, New York.

== Biography ==
María Helena Barrera was born in Pelileo in 1971, the daughter of charity organizer Helena A. Balarezo and Pelileo's mayor Euclides C. Barrera. She earned a doctorate in law from the Central University of Ecuador in 1995, a master's in legal informatics from the University of Montpellier in 1998, a master's in industrial property from Grenoble Alpes University in 1998, and a master's in industrial property from the Franklin Pierce Law Center in 1999.

She has lived in various countries in Europe, Asia, and the United States. Her works include more than 300 articles and essays published in electronic and traditional media in Mexico, Peru, Colombia, Ecuador, and Spain. She is the author of eight books of essays on literary and historical topics.

Barrera is a member of the Casa de la Cultura Ecuatoriana, Tungurahua Chapter, the National Academy of History of Ecuador, PEN America, the National Book Critics Circle in the US, and the India International Centre. Since November 2023, she has been a corresponding member of the Academia Ecuatoriana de la Lengua. She is a regular contributor to the newspaper La Hora's magazine Artes.

She married fellow lawyer Kanishka Agarwala in Ann Arbor, Michigan on 30 June 2001.

== Awards and recognition ==
- 1989: First Prize, Floral Games of the Festival of Fruit and Flowers
- 2015: Benjamin Carrión Award from Casa de la Cultura Ecuatoriana
- 2016: Tungurahua Province Civic Merit Award

=== Aurelio Espinosa Pólit Prize ===
The Aurelio Espinosa Pólit Prize is an award given to Ecuadorian writers by the Pontifical Catholic University of Ecuador (PUCE). María Helena Barrera won it in 2010 with her essay Merton y Ecuador, la búsqueda del país secreto (Merton and Ecuador, the Search for the Secret Country). This deals with Thomas Merton (1915–1968), a Trappist monk born in France. He was passionate about Ecuador, a country he never visited but to which he dedicated writings and correspondence with the sculptor Jaime Andrade Moscoso and the poet Jorge Carrera Andrade in the 1950s. Their main aim was to build a monastery in Ecuador.

The jury's unanimous verdict stated:

This is an essay that explores, in an original way, Thomas Merton's relationship with Ecuador, through his correspondence with the sculptor Jaime Andrade and the poet Jorge Carrera Andrade. It is a solidly structured text, well argued, with sufficient and well-paced information.

== Publications ==
- 2009: La Flama y el Eco
- 2010: Jornadas y Talentos – Ilustres Ecuatorianos en los Estados Unidos
- 2010: Merton y Ecuador: La búsqueda del país secreto
- 2013: León Americano – La última gran polémica de Juan León Mera
- 2013: Mejía Secreto – Facetas insospechadas de José Mejía Lequerica
- 2014: Nazrul: prosa y poemas selectos
- 2015: Anatomía de una traición: la venta de la bandera
- 2015: Dolores Veintimilla, más allá de los mitos
- 2016: De ardiente inspiración. Obras de Dolores Veintimilla (ed.)
- 2022: Disquisiciones
