= Mary Corylé =

Ecuadorian writer and poet

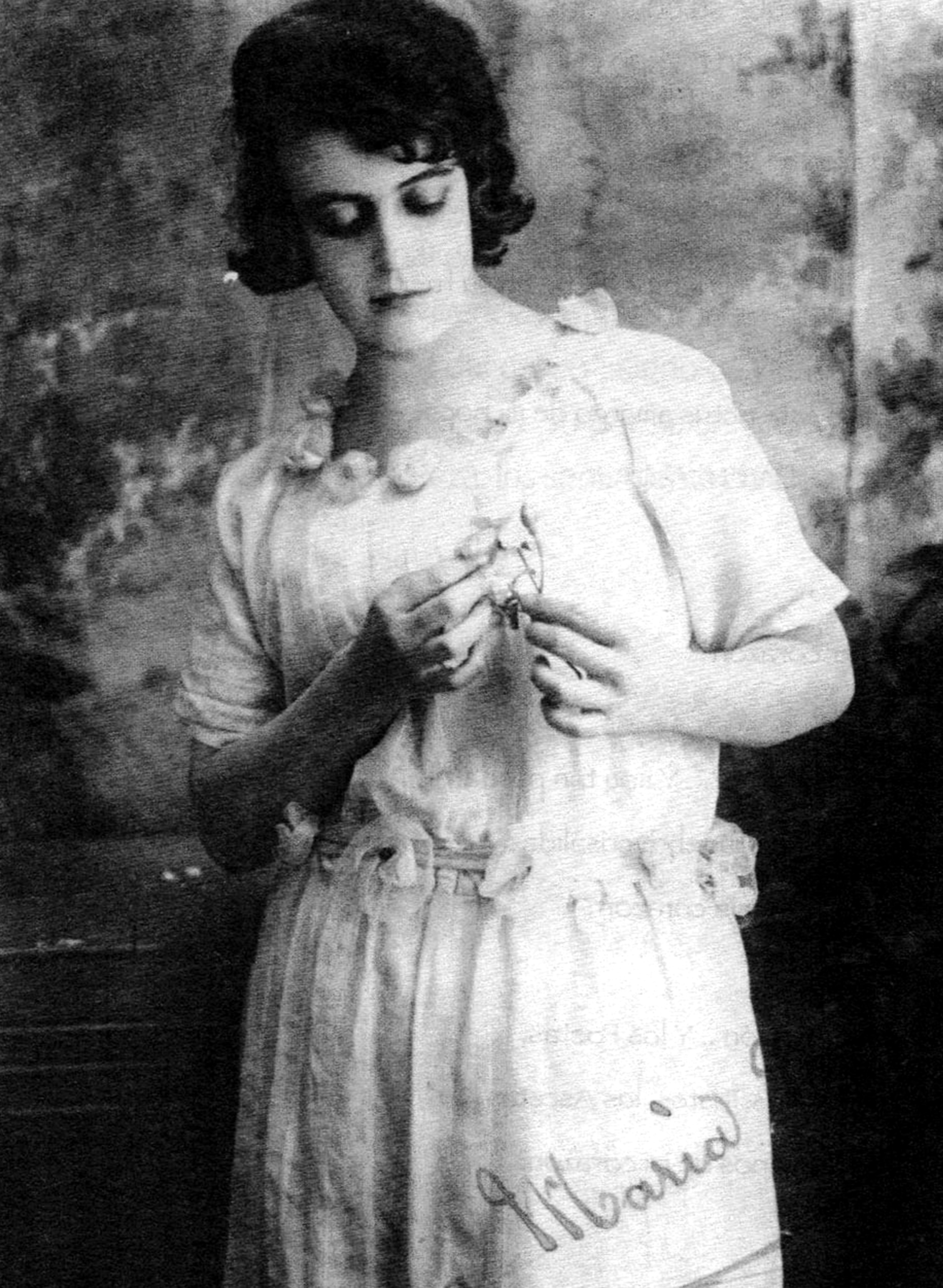
- Corylé in 1920
- Born: María Ramona Cordero y León; May 21, 1894; Cuenca, Ecuador
- Died: May 7, 1976 (aged 81); Cuenca, Ecuador
- Occupations: Writer; poet; journalist
- Relatives: Luis Cordero Crespo (grandfather)
- Writing career
- Pen name: Mary Corylé
- Language: Spanish
- Genres: Poem; lyric

María Ramona Cordero y León (Cuenca, May 21, 1894–ibid., May 7, 1976), best known under her literary pseudonym Mary Corylé, was an Ecuadorian writer and poet.

== Early life ==
She was the daughter of Benjamín Cordero and Ángeles León and the granddaughter of former president Luis Cordero Crespo. She grew up and lived her life in her parents' house facing the Tomebamba River, currently considered a cultural heritage site of the city of Cuenca.

== Career ==
She forged her own identity and became independent, traveling alone to live in Quito where she had romances with musicians and poets. However, she did not accept the conventional marriage regime, instead achieving fulfillment through poetry and letters. Her behavior was questioned by her contemporaries.

She published more than one hundred works, including 23 books, countless poems, lyrics for hymns and "pasillos" ( raditional music in Ecuador). They are recognized for questioning the national events of her time. She wrote with reason and passion, sincere at the level of Alfonsina Storni, poems of wishes of a free woman.

She was the founder of the Municipal Library of Cuenca. She was a defender of women's rights. See worked to break the established schemes regarding voting, and the way of dressing and thinking. She won awards and recognitions. She represented Ecuador as a literary figure. She worked for El Mercurio since its foundation. She directed the National Historical Archive. She was a journalist, researcher, teacher, and playwright. She donated her archive to the Remigio Crespo Museum before she died in 1976, at age 82. Her desire was to be buried directly in the earth to merge into it.

Her grave is located in the Patrimonial Cemetery of Cuenca.

== Works ==
- Canta la vida (1933)
- Mundo pequeño (1948)
- Gleba (1952)
- Nuesa Cuenca de los Andes (1957)
- Dotora sancta Teresa (1962)
- Mio romancero (1945)
- Romance del amor cañari (1974)
- Romancero de Bolívar (1961)
- Romancero de la florecica (1946)
- Romances fechos laureles (1952)
- Marietta de Veintemilla (1977)
- Aguafuertes (1954)
- El cóndor del Aconcagua (1964)
- Cénit en mi cumbre (1968)

== See also ==
- List of Ecuadorian women writers
