= Raymond Mériguet =

Raymond Mériguet Cousségal (1910–1988) was a French activist, businessman, anti-Nazi, and anti-fascist.

Mériguet was born in Paris, France and died in Quito, Ecuador. He was married to the Ecuadorian writer Nela Martínez from 1951 until his death in 1988.

In 1988 Mériguet published a book titled Antinazismo en Ecuador, años 1941–1944 (Anti-Nazism in Ecuador, years 1941–1944), a collection of photocopied documents and original newspaper articles about anti-Nazism in Ecuador during the Second World War.
