= Miguel Donoso Pareja =

Ecuadorian writer

- Born: 13 July 1931; Guayaquil, Ecuador
- Died: 16 March 2015 (aged 83)
- Occupation: Writer
- Spouse(s): Judith Gutiérrez Moscoso, Aralia López González
- Writing career
- Notable awards: Premio Eugenio Espejo (2006)

Miguel Donoso Pareja (13 July 1931 – 16 March 2015) was an Ecuadorian writer and 2006 Premio Eugenio Espejo Award-winner (Ecuador's National Prize in literature, given by the President of Ecuador).

== Biography ==
Donoso Pareja's father was Miguel Donoso Moncayo (1896–1971) from Quito and his mother was Leonor Pareja Diezcanseco from Guayaquil. His uncle was the novelist and diplomat Alfredo Pareja Diezcanseco (1908–1993).

Beginning in 1951, Donoso Pareja frequented the Guayaquil home of Enrique Gil Gilbert where he engaged with other young poets and writers of the time. In 1962 he joined the Communist Party. In 1963 Donoso Pareja became the head of fundraising of the weekly newspaper El Pueblo ("The People"), which was the Communist Party's main publication in Guayaquil. In just a few weeks the police raided and ransacked his home, accusing him of being a terrorist. They took pictures of him with small pieces of metal that looked to contain gunpowder, and the newspapers printed these photographs and accused him of possessing grenades. He was released after two days, but great damage had been done to his reputation.

A few weeks later, on 11 July 1963, the military junta of Ramón Castro Jijón took control of Ecuador, and Donoso Pareja went into hiding, and the newspapers reported that he "went underground". One afternoon, at a secret meeting in darkness set up with his daughters at the Odeon Cinema, but was followed and arrested by junta agents, amidst a tumultuous display. Donoso Pareja was detained in prison barracks for ten months without trial. He was then expelled to Mexico, given a tourist passport, and released without any money. He had to request assistance from friends in order to afford to travel out of the country.

In Mexico, Donoso Pareja worked as a literature and writing teacher in various institutions, including the National Autonomous University of Mexico and the National Institute of Fine Arts. He also worked as a newspaper writer. In 1976, he edited the magazine Cambio ("Change") along with other famous writers such as Juan Rulfo, Julio Cortázar, José Revueltas, Pedro Orgambide, and Eraclio Zepeda, until the magazine's final publication in 1981.

In 1976, Donoso Pareja wrote Día tras día ("Day After Day"), which is a novel about his exile. In 1981, nearly 18 years after being expelled from Ecuador, he decided to return to his homeland, leaving behind his job and friends in Mexico. That year, he wrote Nunca más el mar ("Never Again the Sea"), a novel about his own return from exile.

In 1985 Donoso Pareja was awarded a Guggenheim Fellowship grant of $26,000 to write fiction; he then traveled several months in Spain and other European countries and spent all the money, and so returned to Ecuador, locked himself up in a borrowed apartment, and wrote 22 stories of love, which expressed a deep sense of loneliness and despair. The stories were published in a book titled Lo mismo que el olvido ("Same as Oblivion").

His 2002 book Adagio en G mayor received the Jorge Carrera Andrade Award from the Municipality of Quito.

In 198?, Donoso Pareja was elected president of the Guayas branch of the House of Ecuadorian Culture, and moved permanently to Guayaquil. He died on 13 March 2015, aged 83, after years of suffering from Parkinson's disease.

== Family ==
Donoso Pareja married Judith Gutiérrez Moscoso from Babahoyo, divorcing in 1967. By Gutiérrez Moscoso, had Leonor, died as an adolescent, Maria del Carmen and Miguel Donoso Gutiérrez, who authored a collection of short stories titled Punta de Santa Clara, which received the Jose de la Cuadra Prize (1982)

In 1979, Donoso Pareja married Corunnan born and Cuban raised Aralia López González, divorcing in 1983.

== Works ==
- La Mutación del Hombre (1958), poetry
- Las Raíces del Hombre (1958), poetry
- Krelko y otros cuentos (1962), stories
- Los Invencibles (1963), poetry
- Primera Canción del Exilado (1968), poetry
- El Hombre que mataba a sus hijos (1968), stories
- Henry Blak (1983), novel
- La Hora del Lobo (1970), a collection of articles about literature and cinema
- Día tras día (1976), a novel about his exile
- Cantos para celebrar una Muerte (1977), poetry
- Nunca más el mar (1981), a novel about his return from exile
- Lo mismo que el olvido (1985) stories
- Todo lo que inventamos es cierto (1991), stories
- Hoy empiezo a acordarme (1994), novel
- El Otro lado del Espejo (1996), stories
- La Muerte de Tyrone Power López en el monumental Barcelona (1997), novel
- Ecuador, identidad o esquizofrenia (1998) a sociology booklet about Ecuadorian national identity
