= Escogedoras de café =

1939 painting by Alba Calderón

Escogedoras de café (1939)
- Artist: Alba Calderón

Escogedoras de café (Coffee Pickers) (1939) is a painting by the Ecuadorian social realist artist Alba Calderón. In this tropical-colored painting, peasants are toiling on a coffee plantation overseen by a majordomo with a sheathed machete. The peasants' faces are not shown or are covered by sombreros.
