= Enrique Gil Calderón =

Ecuadorian choral director

- Born: May 14, 1935; Guayaquil, Ecuador
- Died: December 11, 2008 (aged 73); Guayaquil, Ecuador
- Occupation: Conductor
- Awards: Premio Eugenio Espejo (2008)

Enrique Gil Calderón (Guayaquil, May 14, 1935 - Guayaquil, December 11, 2008) was an Ecuadorian choral director. He was the son of the novelist Enrique Gil Gilbert and the painter Alba Calderón Zatizábal.

He had a daughter with soprano Beatriz Parra, who also trained in Russia to perform lyrical music.

Gil Calderón was awarded the Premio Eugenio Espejo in 2008 by the Ecuadorian President Rafael Correa (2007–Present) after he rejected the prize in 1995 from President Sixto Duran Ballen (1992-1996).

Gil Calderón died of leukemia in 2008.
