= Ignacio Lasso =

Ignacio Lasso (1911–1943) was an Ecuadorian poet born in Quito. He was the mentor and founder of the magazine of the poets of Elan, a group integrated by Ecuadorian poets born between 1905 and 1920. He collaborated with several magazines of his time. Benjamin Carrión said of Lasso in 1937: "In spite of his brave incursions of high poetic value, Lasso is a poet with an American mind and European sensitivity. His legacy is more in line with the poets of ULISES in Mexico. We can clearly see the influence of the poet Jaime Torres Bodet”.

== Bibliography ==
- Escafandra (Quito, 1934)
- Ensayo y poesía (Quito, 1957)
- Indice de la poesía ecuatoriana contemporánea (Santiago de Chile, 1937)
- Los de Elan y una voz grande (Guayaquil, s.f.)
- Poesía viva del Ecuador (Quito, 1990)
