= Al subir el aguaje =

Short story by Joaquín Gallegos Lara

- Author: Joaquín Gallegos Lara
- Language: Spanish
- Genre: Short story
- Publication date: 1930
- Publication place: Ecuador

Al subir el aguaje (English: As the Water Rises) is a short story by Ecuadorian writer Joaquín Gallegos Lara. It was published in 1930 as part of the book Los que se van. It was the first Ecuadorian literary work to portray the subject of female homosexuality.

== Characterization ==
Manflor is the protagonist of the story, and is described as a strong woman who possesses some characteristics commonly considered male, such as round arms with bulked up muscles. The term manflor is an Argentine idiom used to designate men with effeminate traits or behavior, derived from the combination of the words man and flor ('flower') which is the classical symbol of femininity. Cuchucho is the other major character in the story, whose name is derived from the coati, an Amazonian mammal, whose flesh is considered as an aphrodisiac locally.

In the story Manflor is insulted because of her appearance and homosexuality by the Cuchucho, who calls her a tortillera. According to the writer Raúl Vellejo, the characterization of Manflor represents dissent of the regular norms imposed by society, while Cuchucho represents violence and machismo.

== Synopsis ==
Manflor and Cuchucho are on a raft in the middle of the river when the water level begins to rise. Cuchucho tries to seduce Manflor despite knowing her sexual orientation and preference for females. She rejects it, and Cuchucho pounces on her and tries to force her to engage in intimate activity. Manflor fights back and tries to repel his advances. However, as they were stuck in the middle of the river, and seeing that the Cuchucho was not willing to give up, Manflor challenges him to a one on one fight with machetes. As per her terms, if Cuchucho wins, Manflor will give in to his desire, and if Manflor wins, Cuchucho should stop disturbing her. Both of them engage in a fierce fight, with Manflor finally able to get the better of Cuchucho. So Cuchucho resigns himself in defeat and leaves her alone.
