= Graciela Levi Castillo =

Ecuadorian journalist and writer

Graciela Levi Castillo (4 September 1926 – 8 October 2014) was an Ecuadorian journalist and writer.

== Career ==
Graciela Levi Castillo was born in Guayaquil in 1926. She was the daughter of Roberto Levi Hoffman, a Sephardic Jewish chemist who had immigrated from Germany, and María Piedad Castillo de Levi, a prominent Ecuadorian writer and feminist.

She studied journalism at Columbia University in New York and both communications and international relations at the University of Guayaquil, where she received a master's degree in international diplomacy.

Levi Castillo was Ecuador's first national director of tourism. She also acted as a representative of Ecuador and of the Guayaquil Chamber of Industries in various meetings of the Federation of Pharmaceutical Industries.

In her work as a journalist, Levi Castillo interviewed a wide variety of high-profile international figures, including the politicians Eva Perón, John F. Kennedy, Lyndon B. Johnson, and Gamal Abdel Nasser; the writers Jean Cocteau and Ernest Hemingway; the painters Pablo Picasso and Max Ernst; and the performers Frank Sinatra and Sofia Loren. She had a special audience with Pope Pius XII and reported exclusively on the canonization of the first Ecuadorian saint, Mariana de Jesús.

Levi Castillo worked in journalism her whole life, including for the publication El Telégrafo, as well as other Ecuadorian and international magazines and newspapers. She was named as a correspondent for the Associated Press, ABC in Madrid, La Prensa in Buenos Aires, Excélsior in Mexico, and El Universal in Caracas. She was also a member of the Casa de la Cultura in Guayas and of various professional organizations for Ecuadorian journalists.

== Personal life ==
Levi Castillo was a worldly traveler and socialite, once causing an incident when she rushed up to Prince Rainier III of Monaco and kissed him on the cheek in front of his new fiancee, Grace Kelly, at a ball in New York.

In 1963, she married the New York City lawyer Bernard Olcott. Their marriage only lasted for two years, and Levi Castillo returned to Ecuador with their young daughter, Victoria, after their divorce.

== Death and recognition ==
In 1997 Ecuador's National Congress honored her for her work in social communications.

She died in 2014, in Panama.

In 2015, a library was named for her at the María Piedad Castillo de Levi School, which was named for her mother, in the province of El Oro. A park was also named for her in northern Guayaquil the following year.
