= Yanna Hadatty =

Ecuadorian short story writer and essayist

Yanna Hadatty Mora (born Guayaquil, 1969) is an Ecuadorian short story writer and essayist.

== Biography ==
Haddatty has lived in Mexico since 1992, where she completed her higher education and worked as a professor. She earned her doctorate in Ibero-American Literature from the Autonomous University of Mexico (UNAM), where she later worked as a professor and researcher of contemporary literature. She also taught at the University of the Cloister of Sor Juana and at the UAM Xochimilco.

== Memberships ==
She is a full member of the House of Ecuadorian Culture and Executive Secretary of the Association of Ecuadorianists in Mexico.

She has been a member of the National System of Researchers of Mexico since 2005.

== Works ==
=== Short story ===
- Quehaceres postergados (Guayaquil, 1998)

=== Essay ===
- Autofagia y narración (Madrid: Iberoamericana, 2003)
- La ciudad paroxista (México: UNAM, 2009)

=== Anthology ===
Her works have been included in the following anthologies

- El libro de los abuelos (Guayaquil, 1990)
- Cuento contigo (Guayaquil, 1993)
- Antología de narradoras ecuatorianas (Quito, 1997)
- 40 cuentos ecuatorianos (Guayaquil, 1997)
- Antología básica del cuento ecuatoriano (Quito, 1998)
- Nós e os outros. Histórias de diferentes culturas (São Paulo, 2000)
