= Los Sangurimas =

Novel by José de la Cuadra

- Author: José de la Cuadra
- Language: Spanish
- Series: Panorama literario español y hispanoamericano
- Genre: Novel
- Publisher: Madrid: Editorial Cenit
- Publication date: 1934
- Publication place: Ecuador
- OCLC: 5088350

Los Sangurimas is a novel written by Ecuadorian writer José de la Cuadra in 1934.

The story is set in the property "La Hondura", in the Ecuadorian coast. It is about the Sangurimas, a family full of conflicts and legends and taking justice into their own hands.
