= Jaime Andrade Moscoso =

Ecuadorian sculptor

- Born: 1913; Quito, Ecuador
- Died: April 23, 1990 (aged 76–77); Quito, Ecuador

Jaime Andrade Moscoso (1913 – 23 April 1990) was an Ecuadorian sculptor specializing in realism and expressionism, along with abstractions near the end of his life. He was best known for his ability to sculpt from a wide variety of materials, including marble, wood, metal, rolled wire, and volcanic stone. He has added work within the realm of drawing, watercolor, and other murals.

== Life ==
Attended the schools of the Christian Brothers, then entered the Quito School of Fine Arts in 1928, then later the New School of Social Research in New York in 1941. For a brief time he was the pupil of well known Italian sculptor Luigi Cassadio. He would then return to the School of Fine arts as a professor. In 1954 for 2 years he was the director of the Art Department of the St. Louis Country Day School. In 1962 Jaime founded and became a director of the Ecuadorian Institute of Folklore.

== Works ==
- Llacta Mama (1940)
- El Arbol (1940)
- Sculpture of the Western Hemisphere (1941)
- Girl (1945)
- Flight (1979) - compared the tensions of airplanes with birds
- Friezes within the Social Security Institute, the Central University, the Quito Airport, the Loan Bank, the Central Bank, the Thessaly of Machachi, the Hotel Colón, and the garden of the newspaper El Comercio.
- The Virgin and Child (1958)
- Stone Mosaic (1960)
- Hug (1968)
- Couple (1969).

== Awards ==
- The Mariano Aguilera (1940) with a stone head
- Ministry of Fine Arts Award with Llacta Mama (1940)
- Acquisition Award, in New York (1941) with Sculpture of the Western Hemisphere
- Sculpture Prize from the Javeriana University of Bogotá (1943)
- Award from the University Citadel of Quito for a stone mural
- Art featured in the Muñoz Mariño Museum of Watercolor and Drawing
