= María Piedad Castillo de Levi =

Ecuadorian writer, poet, feminist and journalist

María Piedad Castillo de Levi (July 6, 1888 – March 4, 1962) was an Ecuadorian writer, poet, and journalist. She is also recognized as an important feminist who fought for women's suffrage in Ecuador, for which she was targeted by the authorities.

== Life ==
Born María Lucía Castillo Castillo in Guayaquil, Ecuador, in 1888, she was the daughter of María Blanca Bethsabé Castillo Martíz and the journalist and politician José Abel Castillo, who owned the newspaper El Telégrafo.

Castillo began writing poetry at a young age, winning her first recognition, a gold medal for her poem "A Colombia," at a Quito literary competition in 1910.

In 1915, she married José Roberto Levi Hoffman, a Sephardic Jewish chemist who had immigrated from Germany just a few years prior (1909). Their courtship had begun five years earlier with the conceit that he would teach her German and she would teach him Spanish.

Castillo traveled to Paris to study in the Faculty of Philosophy and Letters at the Sorbonne. On her return to Ecuador, she began working for the publication El Telégrafo Literario. She wrote numerous poems, which appeared both in El Telégrafo and in various magazines.

As a feminist, Castillo supported the movement for women's right to vote, clashing with the authorities. In 1924, she participated in a demonstration in the streets of Guayaquil alongside fellow suffragettes. When officers on horseback attempted to stop them, she shouted:

"Kill us! We came to demand a right, not to beg for it."

In June 1933, she funded the magazine Nuevos Horizontes with a group of fellow feminists. It served as the media organ of the Legión Femenina de Educación Popular, an organization that worked to improve the rights of women workers. They also created a radio program, which the presidential candidate José María Velasco Ibarra appeared on in 1934.

In 1935, Castillo was a candidate for minister of education, and El Telégrafo supported her candidacy. But women were still broadly excluded from Ecuadorian politics at the time, so she was denied the position.

In 1937, her husband became an Ecuadorian citizen as Germany's persecution of the Jews escalated. He later helped persuade the national government to let Jews fleeing Europe migrate to Ecuador. The couple had several children, including the journalist Graciela Levi Castillo.

She served as the Ecuadorian delegate to the Inter-American Commission of Women for many years, beginning in 1940. She also joined the Casa de la Cultura centers in Guayas and Pichincha beginning in 1946.

Castillo traveled widely, spending long periods in the United States and even working as a foreign correspondent in Germany. She was a member of the National Press Club in Washington.

In 1955, Castillo was declared "Woman of the Americas" by the Unión de Mujeres Americanas. She was also honored by the Ateneo Ecuatoriano in Quito the same year. In 1960, she was recognized by the Unión de Quiteños. In recognition of her poetic work, Casa de la Cultura published her collection Poemas de Ayer y de Hoy in 1962.

Castillo died just a few months later, in Quito, on March 4, 1962, aged 73.
