= Federico Malo =

Ecuadorian entrepreneur and financier

Federico Eulogio Malo Andrade (5 July 1859 – 14 February 1932) was an Ecuadorian entrepreneur and financier born in Cuenca, Ecuador.

== Early life and education ==
Malo was an Ecuadorian entrepreneur, he exported panama hats and quinine. He was born in Cuenca, on July 5, 1859, to Dr. Luis Malo Valdivieso, a lawyer and lieutenant colonel, and Mrs. Jesús Andrade Morales, niece of the President of Ecuador, Dr. Jeronimo Carrion y Palacio.

In 1877, he traveled to Europe to live in Paris and London, where he studied economy and law. He stayed there until 1879, and returned to Cuenca, where he was established until 1883, when he returned to Paris. He became a friend of Juan Montalvo, an Ecuadorian writer resident there. When he finally went back to Cuenca in 1887, he married Mrs. Leticia de Andrade Chiriboga (1870–1935) on March 23, 1888. They had eleven children.

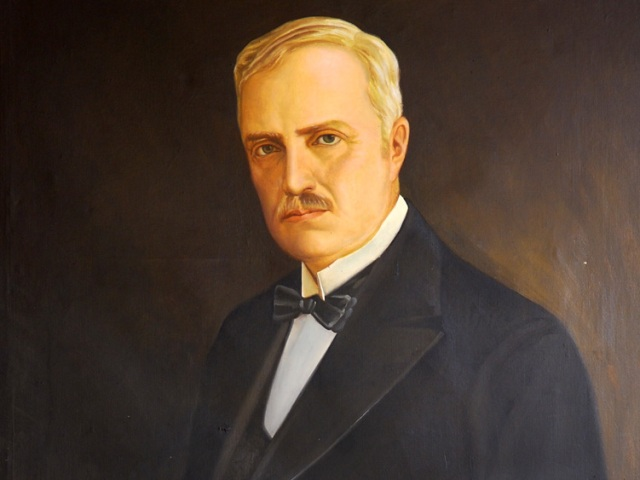
Federico Malo Andrade, by Abraham Sarmiento Carrion

== Career ==
He was the Secretary of the City Council in 1891, a French and English teacher at Benigno Malo National College of Cuenca in 1892. He became a Congressman in 1896, Rector of Benigno Malo National College in 1896-1900,1901–1906, and 1914–1916. In the year 1903, he was appointed as President of the City Council. In 1912, he became the President of Azuay's Liberal Party, Governor of Azuay between 1916 and 1920, and Senator in 1924.

In 1912, he imported the first automobile from London. In 1913, he founded Cuenca's first Bank, Banco del Azuay, and in 1919, Cuenca's Commerce Chamber. He participated in the opening of a branch of Ecuador's Central Bank in Cuenca, in 1928, of which he became president.

== Death ==
Malo died in Cuenca, Ecuador, on February 14, 1932, at the age of 72.
