= Veronica Bonilla =

Colombian children's writer

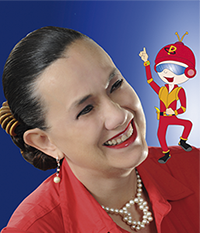
- Veronica Bonilla with Platanario, a character from her books, 2012
- Born: Silvia Verónica Bonilla Piñeiros; 11 June 1962 (age 64); Quito, Ecuador
- Occupations: Children's writer author Graphic designer
- Spouse: Married
- Children: 3
- Writing career
- Pen name: Veronica Bonilla
- Language: Spanish, English
- Period: 2012–present
- Genres: Children's writing Fantasy, fiction Picture books
- Notable works: Platanario series Magic Dream
- Website: www.veronicabonilla.com

Veronica Bonilla is a children's writer, illustrator, and graphic designer from Ecuador. She was born on 11 June 1962 in Quito D.M. and has published children's literature since 2012. She has 71 international book registers ISBN in several formats, in paper as well as in digital format. She publishes in both Spanish and English, and she also has produced audiobooks.

== Career ==
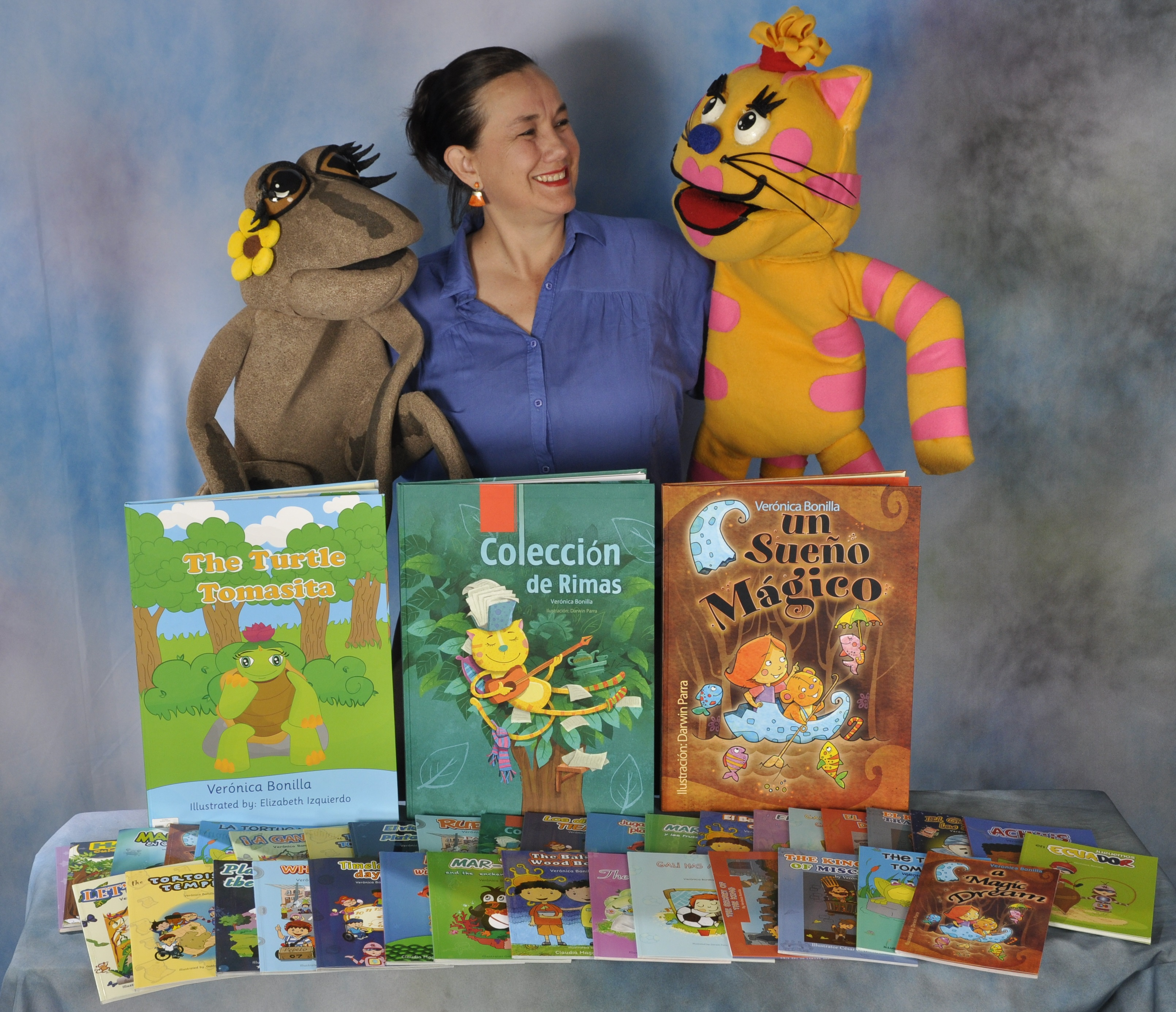
Veronica Bonilla with printed books, 2014, with July the Frog and Renata the Cat, characters from two of hers books.

With her experience as an educator, mother of three daughters, and ISO 9001 consultant, she debuted as writer of children's literature in 2012. With 14 titles, surpassing the production of 43 university editorial houses, she set a national record for a single author in Ecuador.

From 2012 to 2013 with Vebodi Editorial, she has published 37 books in coated paper, all of her books series are completely illustrated.

In a book series about Platanario, a children's character that is an extraterrestrial kid that fall in love with our planet, she applies her experience as ISO 9001 consultant and introduces concepts to kids such as teamwork, planning, corrective actions, preventive actions. This series is also multi-cultural, inclusive, and shows the culture of Ecuador.

As a graphic designer, she is the creator of the character Lecturin, whom she uses to promote reading. At the official site, it is possible to download a free digital magazine for kids.

She has created eleven characters that live in her publications: Platanario, naniBOT, Pepeko, Juanuka, Pichusa, Pedroko, Hadani, Mar-Tin, Vagotón, Tontón, Lecturin. Since 2012, she performs lectures to stimulate reading and workshops about imagination and creativity for librarians, teachers, fathers and mothers, also children.

She has been an educator and bilingual teacher in private institutions, and as education consultant is coauthor of a Guide of good practices for school teachers, published by Ministry of Education of Ecuador.

In 2014, she published big books in size DIN A3 in coated paper, the BIG BOOK collection. In her international stage, she devoted her time to publish e-books in both Spanish and English, also iBooks for Apple.

== Works ==
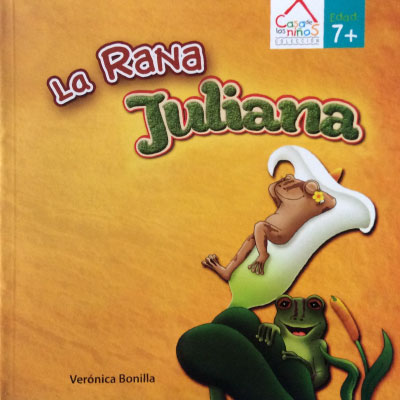
Recent book: La Rana Juliana – Spanish

The first book published by Veronica Bonilla is titled Gali tiene un balón, illustrated by Darwin Parra a well known artist of Cuenca city.

Veronica Bonilla has published 71 books, all completely illustrated: 14 in Spanish and in paper in year 2012; 23 books in paper in 2013, from those 15 in English; and in 2014 a total of 34 E-books in several formats, and for several series. Finally, by the end of 2014, her most recent book in paper.

Her most recent book came printed from Editorial Casa de la Cultura Ecuatoriana Benjamín Carrión, titled in Spanish La Rana Juliana ISBN 978-9978-62-790-7, in coated paper, completely illustrated, in December 2014. This book has been published as E-book in English for iPad as July the Frog with ISBN 978-9942-961-32-7 published by Vebodi.

This book is an adventure about an Andean marsupial frog; it carries an ecological message for kids to avoid the endangerment of this species, because its habitat is in danger by humans.

She has also produced three audiobooks in Spanish, developing own music to incorporate in her digital books.

=== Printed books in Spanish ===
- Achiiis ISBN 978-9942-9941-5-8
- Chispitas de Alegría ISBN 978-9942-9941-6-5
- El Genio de los deseos ISBN 978-9942-961-08-2
- Hadani cuida el bosque ISBN 978-9942-9941-3-4
- Juguemos en Ecuador ISBN 978-9942-961-09-9
- La tortuga Tomasita ISBN 978-9942-9941-7-2
- Mar-Tin en Galápagos ISBN 978-9942-961-10-5
- Un sueño mágico ISBN 978-9942-9941-1-0
- A Ganar ISBN 978-9942-9877-1-6
- Colección de Rimas ISBN 978-9942-9877-8-5
- El Barquito de Balsa ISBN 978-9942-9894-0-6
- El ratoncito r54 ISBN 978-9942-9877-9-2
- El reino de las travesuras ISBN 978-9942-9894-3-7
- El Secreto del Rey ISBN 978-9942-9877-7-8
- El templo de las tortugas ISBN 978-9942-9877-6-1
- El viajero Platanario ISBN 978-9942-9877-5-4
- Gali tiene un balón ISBN 978-9942-9877-0-9
- Hadani la aprendiz de bruja ISBN 978-9942-9877-4-7
- Jugando con plastilina ISBN 978-9942-9894-2-0
- Los días sin tiempo ISBN 978-9942-9877-3-0
- Mar -Tin y las frutas encantadasISBN 978-9942-9894-1-3
- Ruedas ISBN 978-9942-9877-2-3
- Colección de Rimas ISBN 978-9942-961-15-0
- El ratoncito r54 ISBN 978-9942-961-18-1
- La tortuga Tomasita / The Turtle Tomasita ISBN 978-9942-961-16-7 (Bilingual)
- Un sueño mágico ISBN 978-9942-961-14-3
- La rana Juliana ISBN 978-9942-961-17-4
- Mágico Yasuní ISBN 978-9942-961-33-4

=== Printed books in English ===
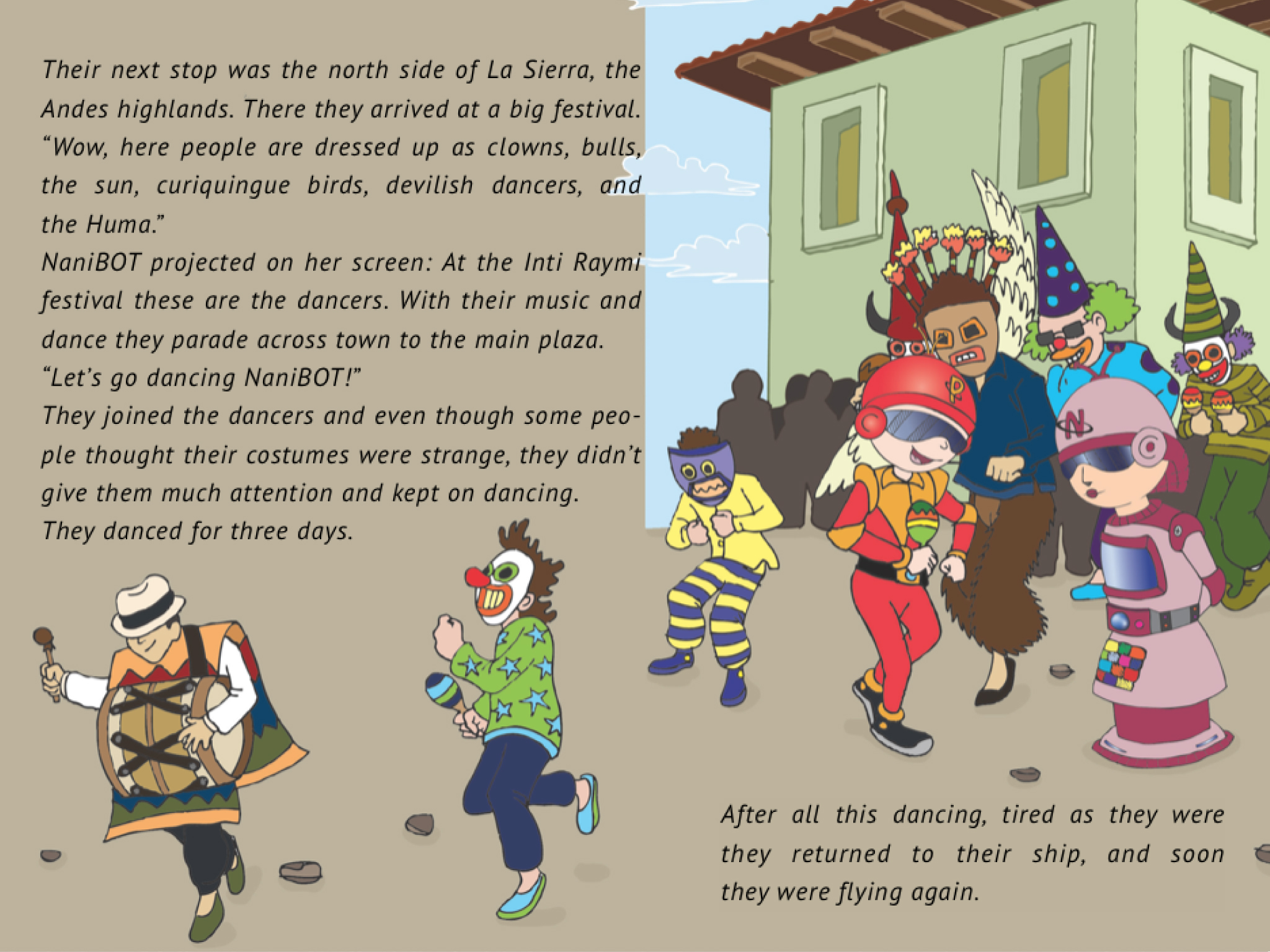
Sample page of book PLATANARIO THE TRAVELER

- Alegria's Sparkles of Happiness ISBN 978-9942-961-04-4
- Let's Win ISBN 978-9942-9941-9-6
- Mar-Tin and the Enchanted Fruits ISBN 978-9942-961-05-1
- Platanario the Traveler ISBN 978-9942-961-01-3
- Play with Clay ISBN 978-9942-961-07-5
- r54 The Little Mouse ISBN 978-9942-9941-4-1
- The Balsa Wood Boat ISBN 978-9942-961-02-0
- The Kingdom of Mischief ISBN 978-9942-9941-2-7
- A Magic Dream ISBN 978-9942-9894-6-8
- The Secret of the King ISBN 978-9942-961-03-7
- The Turtle Tomasita ISBN 978-9942-9941-8-9
- Timeless Days ISBN 978-9942-961-06-8
- The Tortoise's Temple ISBN 978-9942-961-00-6
- Gali has a Ball ISBN 978-9942-9894-8-2
- Wheels ISBN 978-9942-9894-7-5

== Illustrators ==
1. Darwin Parra
2. Gabby Hidalgo
3. César Gavilánez
4. Elizabeth Izquierdo
5. Claudia Maggiorini
6. Flor Margarita Cuichán
7. Eiko Takashima
8. Verónica Bonilla
