= Nela Martínez =

Ecuadorian communist, political militant, activist, and writer

- Born: Mariana de Jesús Martínez Espinosa; November 24, 1912; Cañar, Ecuador
- Died: 30 July 2004 (aged 91); Havana, Cuba
- Occupation: Writer
- Spouse(s): Joaquín Gallegos Lara, Raymond Mériguet

Nela Martínez Espinosa (November 24, 1912 – July 30, 2004) was an Ecuadorian communist, political militant, activist, and writer. For four days in 1944 she was the leader of Ecuador.

== Early life ==
Nela Martinez was born in Cañar, Ecuador. Her baptismal name was Mariana de Jesús Martínez Espinosa. Her parents were Cesar Martínez Borrero and Enriqueta Espinoza, and they were part of the landowning class. Her father was conservative, but her mother was more liberal and educated and encouraged her children to get involved in cultural activity. Nela was the eighth of thirteen children. Her brothers and sisters were Sofía, Paquita, Aurora, Julio Cesar, Enriqueta, Lola Guillermo, Ricardo, Magdalena, Gerardo and Estela. Her brother Cornelio died at the age of seventeen, and two other siblings died at a younger age.

Martinez enjoyed writing from childhood. She joined the Communist Party of Ecuador at a young age, eventually becoming part of its leadership.

== Political life ==
On May 28, 1944, Martinez took an active role in the Glorious May Revolution, which toppled the dictatorship of Carlos Arroyo del Río. She orchestrated the takeover of the Government Palace, and for four days she was in charge of the Ecuadorian government. This made her the second woman leader of the Ecuadorian government in its history. (The first was Marieta de Veintemilla, niece of Ignacio de Veintimilla in 1883). However, Martinez was never officially named president. In 1945, she became the first female congresswoman of the National Assembly of Ecuador during the second term of President José María Velasco Ibarra.

Martínez founded several notable publications, including: the Ñucanchic Allpa, the first Kichwa-language newspaper in Ecuador, and Nuestra Palabra in the 1960s, the first feminist newspaper in Ecuador.

Martínez had been the director of the Communist Party of Ecuador, founder of the Ecuadorian Female Alliance, and founder of the Revolutionary Union of Women of Ecuador. Together with Dolores Cacuango she founded the Ecuadorian Federation of Indians, which established the first indigenous schools that taught in Quechua.

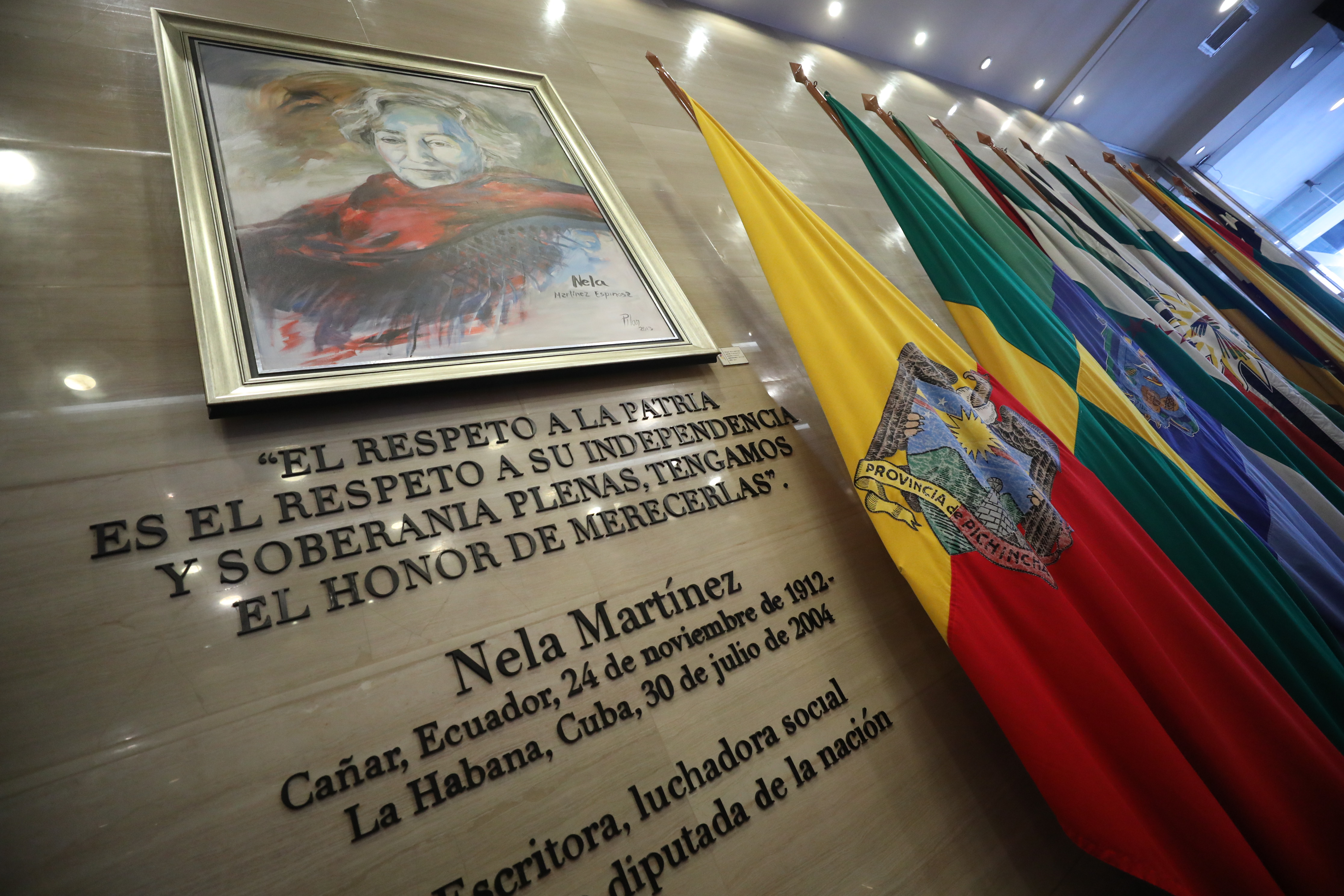
The building of the National Assembly in January 2024

Martínez was an anti-interventionist, anti-imperialist, and opposed many U.S. government policies. She was a supporter and advocate of the Cuban Revolution and admirer of Fidel Castro until her final days.

== Personal life ==
Martínez married her mentor, fellow communist and celebrated novelist Joaquín Gallegos Lara (1909–1947) of the Guayaquil Group, who had had disabilities since birth. At the age of 21, she told her father: "I intend to marry Joaquín, who is disabled". When her father remarked "Why don’t you become a charity nun?" she said "I want to fight against injustice, and if nature was unjust with him, then I will fight against nature". Sadly their marriage was brief and ended in divorce. Joaquín Lara left an unfinished novel titled Guandos when he died in 1947; Nela Martinez completed the book and it was published in 1982. Both writers are credited as the authors of Guandos.

Later Martínez had a relationship with Ricardo Paredes, the "Apostle of Ecuadorian Communism" and the founder of the Socialist Party-Broad Front in 1926. (The organisation later changed its name to the Communist Party of Ecuador in 1931). Martínez and Paredes had a son named Leonardo Paredes Martínez.

In 1951 she married the French revolutionary and antifascist Raymond Mériguet (1910–1988), with whom she remained until his death. They had three children: Juan Cristóbal, Mauricio and Nela Meriguet Martínez.

Martínez died at the age of 91 in Havana, Cuba in 2004. Her ashes were returned to Quito, Ecuador where they were buried in the El Batán Cemetery, in the presence of her children, grandchildren, and friends.

== Selected works ==
- "El Azote" (circa 1930), poem
- Guandos (1982), unfinished novel by Joaquín Gallegos Lara, completed after his death by Nela Martinez.
- Cuentos de la tortura
