= Leopoldo Benites =

Ecuadorian diplomat

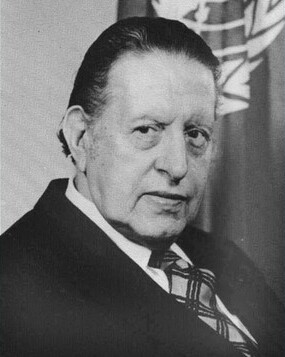
- 1973 UN Portrait

28th President of the United Nations General Assembly
- In office 1973–1974
- Preceded by: Stanisław Trepczyński
- Succeeded by: Abd al-Aziz Bouteflika

Personal details
- Born: 17 October 1905 Guayaquil, Ecuador
- Died: 1 January 1996 (aged 90)
- Children: 2
- Education: University of Guayaquil (BA)
- Profession: Politician

Leopoldo Benites (17 October 1905 – 1 January 1996) was an Ecuadorian diplomat who served as the 28th President of the United Nations General Assembly in 1973. He had been the permanent representative of Ecuador since October 1960.

== Early life and education ==
Benites was born Leopoldo Benites Vinueza in Guayaquil in Ecuador on 17 October 1905. His father was a physician. He attended the University of Guayaquil, where he earned a degree in social and political science.

== Career ==
He was a diplomat who served as the Ecuadorean ambassador to a number of countries. Benites served as a Professor and earned an honorary doctorate from the University of Montevideo in Uruguay. He worked as a journalist, a role in which he later said he was against dictatorship. In the 1930s he spent eight months in jail. Whilst in jail—an experience he described as "interesting"—he wrote a biography of Francisco de Orellana.

Benites was Ecuador's ambassador to Uruguay from 1947 to 1952. In 1954 he took on a similar role in Bolivia until 1956 when he spent a brief period as ambassador to Argentina. At the end of 1956 he took up the role of ambassador to Uruguay to August 1960. He then became the Permanent representative at the United Nations.

Benites published short stories and poems as well as longer studies of the Ecuadoran hero Eugenio Espejo and Francisco de Orellana, the Spanish conquistador who travelled the length of the River Amazon and founded Benites' home city.

In 1965, Benites led the Ecuadorian delegation to a meeting for the Denuclearization of Latin America which was held in Mexico City. He continued to work for denuclearization and in 1971 he became the first official Secretary-General of OPANAL an international organization that promotes nuclear disarmament. He only resigned this post when he was told that he was a strong candidate to be the United Nations' next Secretary General.

An anecdote of Benites reports that an Asian UN delegate said to Benites that he liked his speech but did not like the vote that he cast. Benites said "The arguments are my own, but the vote was my government's instruction".

He became the 28th President of the United Nations General Assembly in 1973. By this time he was a veteran at the UN, having been to eighteen general assemblies, at twelve of these he had been Ecuador's main delegate. In his maiden speech as President, following his appointment, he had the honour of admitting the Bahamas and both East and West Germany into the United Nations. The admission of the two halves of Germany was an important moment as the UN had been formed as a reaction to World War II which had been initiated by Nazi Germany. This brought the total number of nations in the U.N. to 135 and at the time the prospective candidates were North and South Korea.

Benites was one of 11 General Assembly presidents who were summoned back to the United Nations in 1985 to advise on how the UN could increase its impact.

== Personal life ==
When he was 20, Benites married Margot Sierra. He had two sons, Leopoldo and Robert. Benites died in 1996.

== Works ==
- Socialist Thought, 2008
- Argonauts of the jungle, 1992
- Ecuador, drama and paradox, 1986
- Francisco Eugenio Espejo, a resident of the night, 1984
- Poems in three stages, 1977
- The discoverers of the Amazon, 1976
- Ecuador, 1950

Diplomatic posts
Preceded by Stanisław Trepczyński	President of the United Nations General Assembly; 1973–1974	Succeeded by Abd al-Aziz Bouteflika
