= Enrique Gil Gilbert =

Ecuadorian novelist, journalist and poet

- Born: July 8, 1912; Guayaquil, Ecuador
- Died: 21 February 1973 (aged 60); Guayaquil, Ecuador
- Occupation: Writer
- Spouse: Alba Calderón
- Writing career
- Genre: Social Realism
- Notable works: Nuestro Pan (Our Daily Bread) (1942), Yunga (1933), Relatos de Emanuel (1939)

Enrique Gil Gilbert (July 8, 1912 – February 21, 1973) was an Ecuadorian novelist, journalist, poet, and a high-ranking member of the Communist Party of Ecuador.

Gil Gilbert was born and died in the coastal city of Guayaquil, and was the youngest member of the Guayaquil Group, which was one of the most renowned literary and intellectual groups in Ecuador in 1930–40.

Gil Gilbert's most famous novel is Nuestro Pan (Our Daily Bread) (1942), which was translated into English (1943), German, Japanese, and Czech. The novel won Honourable Mention in the Latin-American Prize Novel Competition.

== The Guayaquil Group ==
Critics and historians agree that the Guayaquil Group emerged with the publication of Los que se van, cuentos del cholo y del motuvio (The Vanishing Ones. Stories about the Cholo and the Montuvio) (1930), a social realist book of 34 short stories by Demetrio Aguilera Malta, Joaquín Gallegos Lara, and Enrique Gil Gilbert, that dealt with the lives of the coastal peasant of Ecuador. It marked a whole new type of literature in Ecuador, which until then had been characterized by Romanticism and Modernism.

The group's other members include:

- Demetrio Aguilera Malta
- Alfredo Pareja Diezcanseco
- Joaquín Gallegos Lara
- José de la Cuadra

Their writing featured: a socialist-inspired expose of social-economic abuses; a literature rooted in popular culture; Freudianism; a grotesque vision of the world; and a concern with anthropology and indigenous culture. The Guayaquil Group is considered a forerunner of magical realism.

== Communist life ==
Gil Gilberto was a registered member of the Communist Party of Ecuador. In 1944 he traveled to Moscow in his capacity as Secretary General of the Regional Committee of the Communist Party of Ecuador. He was persecuted for his socialist and militant ideas, and in 1935, under the dictatorship of Federico Paez, he lost his teaching job at the Rocafuerte School in Guayaquil.

Gil Gilberto spent fifteen months in prison under the government of the military junta of 1963. While in prison, law enforcement ransacked his home, and his wife had to flee into exile in Chile, while his children went into hiding. They burned many of his papers and books, including a completed but unpublished book, manuscripts of unfinished works, thus many of his writings were lost forever.

When he was released from prison he was without a home, family, or any money.

== Personal life ==
Gil Gilbert was married to Alba Calderón, a painter, feminist, and revolutionary, who founded the movement for the recognition of women in Ecuador.

Gil Gilbert and Calderon had two sons: Enrique Gil Calderón, a choral director, and Antonio Gil Calderon, a doctor and businessman.

== Books ==
Novels

- Nuestro pan (Guayaquil, 1942), (English translation: Our Daily Bread, 1943, by Dudley Poore. New York: Farrar & Rinehart).

Short Stories

- Los que se van (Guayaquil, 1930)
- Yunga (Guayaquil, 1933)
- Relatos de Emanuel (Guayaquil, 1939)
- La cabeza de un niño en un tacho de basura (Guayaquil, 1967).

Anthologies

- El nuevo relato ecuatoriano (Quito, 1951)
- Antología del cuento hispanoamericano contenporáneo (1958)
- El cuento hispanoamericano (México, 1964)
- Antología del relato ecuatoriano (Quito, 1973)
- Cuento de la generación de los 30 (Guayaquil, s.f)
- Así en la tierra como en los sueños (Quito, 1991)
- Cuento contigo (Guayaquil, 1993)
- Antología básica del cuento ecuatoriano (Quito, 1998).
