= Joaquín Gallegos Lara =

Ecuadorian social realist novelist, short story writer, poet and essayist

- Born: Joaquín José Enrique De Las Mercedes Gallegos Lara; April 9, 1909; Guayaquil, Ecuador
- Died: November 16, 1947 (aged 38); Guayaquil, Ecuador
- Occupation: Writer
- Spouse: Nela Martínez
- Writing career
- Genre: Social realism
- Notable works: Los que se van (1930), Al subir el aguaje (1930), Las cruces sobre el agua (1946)

Joaquín Gallegos Lara (April 9, 1909 – November 16, 1947) was an Ecuadorian social realist novelist, short story writer, poet, and essayist.

== Biography ==
Joaquín Gallegos Lara was born in Guayaquil in 1909, the son of Emma Lara Calderon and Joaquín Gallegos Del Campo (1873–1910) who founded a newspaper called "El Caustico" in 1895, which was satirical in nature and pro-Eloy Alfaro. Besides being a journalist, his father also wrote poems, which his wife Emma published after his death in a book called Mis Recuerdos (1912), which contained two poems dedicated to his son Joaquín Gallegos Lara: "A mi primogenito" and "El primer diente".

Despite being crippled, Lara fought as a militant communist and intellectual in Ecuador. He participated in street battles and blockades, with the help of a friend who carried him on his shoulders and acted as his legs. He never attended school and was completely self-taught. He spoke French, German, Italian, and Russian almost perfectly. He started writing poems at about 10 years old, when he found out of the suicide death of Medardo Ángel Silva (1898–1919).

Lara's early poems include "Al Potro", "Vieja Despedida", and "Mamá-Jijí" (a character in his novel Las Cruces Sobre el Agua), among others. These poems were published in the literary magazines "Páginas Selectas", "Variedades", "Letras y Números", "Cosmos", and "Ilustración". Years later his poetry took on a social and political view, such as "Poemas de Miss Ecuador" (dedicated to Sarita Chacón Zúñiga, the first Miss Ecuador), "Bandera Roja", "Film Ferroviario", "Romance de la rural", and "Guayas", which were published in newspapers such as La Prensa, El Telégrafo, and Bandera Roja (the official newspaper of the Communist Party of Ecuador).

Many of his stories were collected in Las Cruces Sobre el Agua, a novel published in 1946, which he wrote in pencil 5 years earlier at the age of 21. Two other works, "Los Guandos" and "La Bruja," were published posthumously.

In 1930, he wrote the collection of short stories Los Que Se Van, together with Demetrio Aguilera Malta and Enrique Gil Gilbert. He was part of the "Guayaquil Group" (a group of authors who used social realism in their writing) and played an active role in leftist politics.

In 1947, shortly before his death, he published the book of short stories La Ultima Erranza. In 1952, his Biografía del Pueblo Indio (completed in 1936) was published, and in 1956 another book of his stories was published.

== Work as a literary critic ==
Lara wrote literary criticism and commentary, and wrote the prologues to books such as Estatuas en el mar (1946) by Rafael Díaz Ycaza, Las huellas de una raza (1941) by Marco Antonio Lamota, and Tierra, son, y tambor (1945) by Adalberto Ortiz, among others. He also wrote book reviews in newspapers and magazines. Some of the books he critiqued include Vida del ahorcado (1933) by Pablo Palacio, Los animales puros by Pedro Jorge Vera, and Elba (1946) by Pedro Jijón Salcedo.

== Personal life ==
In 1935, Lara, 26, married Nela Martínez Espinosa, 21, in Ambato. The marriage ended in divorce, but they remained friends throughout their lives.

Lara left an unfinished novel titled Guandos when he died in 1947; Nela Martinez completed the book and it was published in 1982. Both writers are credited as the authors of Guandos

== Awards and honors ==
On October 4, 1944, Lara was awarded the Gold Medal from the Municipality of Guayaquil for his patriotic journalism.

== Death ==
In the beginning of 1947, Lara fell ill as the consequence of a fistula. Doctors tried to cure him with various treatments to no avail. His paternal uncle Julián Lara Calderón wanted to take him to the U.S. to seek treatment, but he was denied a visa, so he went to Lima, Peru, but they expelled him from the country due to his affiliation with the communist party. He returned to Guayaquil, where he died on a Sunday, November 16, 1947, at his home, at around 1 p.m.

== Works ==
- Los que se van (1930)
- Las cruces sobre el agua (1946)
- La última erranza (1947)
- Biografía del Dr. Francisco Campos Coello
- La Bruja (unfinished novel)
- Los Guandos (unfinished novel, completed by his former wife Nela Martínez, published in 1982)
- Biografía del pueblo indio (1952)
- Cuentos completos (1956)
