= Demetrio Aguilera Malta =

Ecuadorian writer, director, painter, and diplomat

- Born: May 24, 1909; Guayaquil, Ecuador
- Died: 29 December 1981 (aged 72); Mexico City, Mexico
- Occupation: Writer
- Writing career
- Genres: Social Realism, Magical Realism
- Notable works: Seven Serpents and Seven Moons

Demetrio Aguilera Malta (Guayaquil, May 24, 1909 – México D.F., December 29, 1981) was an Ecuadorian writer, director, painter, and diplomat. He was a member of the Guayaquil Group of the 1930s, who used social realism in their writings. He used magical realism in his masterpiece Siete lunas y siete serpientes (1970), which was translated into English as Seven Serpents and Seven Moons by Gregory Rabassa in 1979.

== Biography ==
Aguilera Malta was born on May 24, 1909, in Guayaquil, Ecuador. He was the son of Demetrio Aguilera Sánchez and Teresa Malta y Franco. His father officially named him Demetrio Abdon, but his mother hated the name Abdon, and always called him Raúl Demetrio. He stopped using Raúl on the advice of Joaquín Gallegos Lara. His father was a businessman who owned factories and farms. His maternal great-grandfather, Juan José de Malta y Salcedo, was a playwright, and the young Aguilera Malta discovered his works in the library he inherited from his grandfather. Aguilera Malta spent much of his childhood on his family's farm on an island in the Gulf of Guayaquil. He was home-schooled by his mother and tutors. He went to high school at Vicente Rocafuerte School, from which he graduated in 1929. José de la Cuadra was his literature teacher. At the beginning of his college education, he studied law in Guayaquil, but he quit these studies in 1931. Later, he studied literature on a Ministry of Education scholarship in Ecuador and in Madrid, just before the start of the Spanish Civil War. He also worked as a secondary school teacher.

Among other posts, Aguilera Malta was Undersecretary of Education and charge d'affaires in the Ecuadorian Embassy in Chile in 1947 under the government of Carlos Julio Arosemena Tola. Later, he was Cultural Attache in Brazil in 1949 and Ambassador of Ecuador to Mexico from August 1979 until his death in 1981.

He held conferences and courses at several universities in North and South America, including Claremont Colleges and the University of California, Irvine.

He was a war correspondent during the Spanish Civil War. He worked for the journals La Prensa and El Telégrafo in Guayaquil. He also worked for the Panamanian journals El Diario de Panamá, El Gráfico, and La Estrella de Panamá.

Aguilera Malta is considered one of the most important Ecuadorian writers. He was a founding member of the Casa de la Cultura (House of Ecuadorian Culture) and of the Guayaquil Group (together with his best friend Joaquín Gallegos Lara), of the Iberoamerican Community of Writers, and of the Latin American House of Culture. His books have been published around the world and translated into several languages.

Aguilera Malta moved to Mexico in 1958. He had one son, Ciro, with his first love. With his wife, the Panamanian Adda Rosa Endara he had two daughters, Adda Teresa and Marlene. He was with Velia Marqués since 1950, but they had no children.

Aguilera Malta suffered from diabetes and blindness since the early eighties. He died on December 29, 1981, in Mexico City, due to a cerebral hemorrhage after a fall.

== Awards ==
In the 1930 Art Salon, he won two awards. In 1971, he received a gold medal from the Municipality of Guayaquil during the Latin American Writers Meeting. He was awarded the Eugenio Espejo Prize in 1981 in recognition of his outstanding literary career.

== Filmography ==
=== Feature films ===
- La Cadena Infinita" (Chile, 1948)
- Entre dos Carnavales (Brazil, 1949) first movie in color in Brazil

=== Documentaries ===
In 1954, Aguilera Malta filmed four documentaries commissioned by the Ministry of Public Works to promote Ecuador.

- El transporte de banano
- Los Salasacas
- Los Colorados
- Las Iglesias de Quito

== Bibliography ==
=== Novels ===
- Don Goyo (Madrid, 1933); English translation: Don Goyo (1980) by John and Carolyn Brushwood
- Canal Zone (Santiago de Chile, 1935, ed. Ercilla)
- La isla virgen (Guayaquil, 1942)
- Una cruz en la sierra Maestra (Buenos Aires, 1960)
- La caballeresa del sol (Madrid, 1964); English translation: Manuela. A Novel About Simon Bolivar (1967) by Willis Knapp Jones
- El Quijote de El Dorado (Madrid, 1964)
- Un nuevo mar para el Rey (Madrid, 1965)
- Siete lunas y siete serpientes (México, 1970); English translation: Seven Serpents and Seven Moons (1979) by Gregory Rabassa
- El secuestro del general (Mexico, 1973); English translation: Babelandia (1985) by Peter Earle
- Requimen para el diablo (1978)

=== Stories ===
- Los que se van: cuentos del cholo i del montuvio (Guayaquil, 1930) Co-author with Enrique Gil Gilbert and Joaquín Gallegos Lara
- El cholo que se vengó (Mexico, 1992)
- Tu mama la tiene mas grande que tu papa (Mexico 2012)

=== Plays ===
- España leal (Quito, 1938)
- Campeonatomanía (1939)
- Carbón (1939)
- El sátiro encadenado (1939)
- Lázaro (Guayaquil, 1941)
- Sangre azul (Washington,1946)
- Dos comedias fáciles (1950)
- No bastan los átomos, Dientes blancos (Guayaquil, 1955)
- El tigre (1955)
- Honorarios (Quito, 1957)
- Infierno negro (México, 1967)
- Fantoche (1970)
- Muerte S. A. -La muerte es un gran negocio- (1970)
- Una mujer para cada acto (1970)
- Teatro completo (México, 1970)
