= List of Ecuadorians =

This is a list of notable Ecuadorians.

== Arts ==
=== Literature and journalism ===
- Vikot1939- 20067
- Carmen Acevedo Vega (1913–20067) - poet and writer
- Jorge Enrique Adoum (1926–2009) - poet and novelist
- Luis Aguilar-Monsalve (b. 1942) - writer
- Demetrio Aguilera Malta (1909–1981) - writer
- Víctor Manuel Albornoz (1896–1975) - writer and historian
- Gabriela Alemán (b. 1968) - novelist and short story writer
- Carlos Altamirano Sánchez (b. 1926) - poet and journalist
- Vicente Amador Flor (1903–1975) - poet
- María Fernanda Ampuero (b. 1976) - journalist, short story writer
- Juan Andrade Heymann (b. 1945) - novelist, poet, playwright, short story writer
- Raúl Andrade Moscoso (1905–1983) - journalist and playwright
- César E. Arroyo (1887–1937) - poet, novelist, journalist, playwright and diplomat
- Enrique Avellán Ferrés (1904–1984) - novelist and playwright
- Juan Bautista Aguirre (1725–1786) - poet and writer from colonial South America
- Pablo Balarezo Moncayo (1904–1999) - writer, journalist
- Alfonso Barrera Valverde (1929–2013) - writer, diplomat
- María Helena Barrera (b. 1971) - writer
- Ana Cecilia Blum (b. 1972) - writer
- Arturo Borja (1892–1912) - poet
- Luz Elisa Borja (1903–1927) - poet
- Rosa Borja de Ycaza (1889–1964) - poet and essayist
- Vicente Cabrera Funes (1944–2014) - writer
- Jorge Luis Cáceres (b. 1982) - writer, editor
- Oswaldo Calisto Rivera (1979–2000) - poet and artist
- José Antonio Campos (1868–1939) - journalist
- Eliécer Cárdenas (1950–2021) - novelist
- Hipatia Cárdenas de Bustamante (1889–1972) - writer, suffragist
- Jorge Carrera Andrade (1903–1978) - poet
- Alejandro Carrión Aguirre (1915–1992) - writer and journalist
- Fanny Carrión de Fierro (b. 1939) - writer, poet, essayist and professor
- Benjamín Carrión Mora (1897–1979) - writer
- Iván Carvajal (b. 1948) - poet, philosopher, writer
- María Piedad Castillo de Levi (1888–1962) - journalist, suffragist
- Oswaldo Castro (1902-1992) - writer
- Gabriel Cevallos García (1913–2004) - writer and historian
- Fernando Chaves (1902-1999) - writer
- Octavio Cordero Palacios (1870–1930) - writer, playwright, poet, mathematician, lawyer, professor and inventor
- Simón Corral (b. 1946) - poet and playwright
- Mary Corylé (1894–1976) - poet
- Luis Alberto Costales (1926–2006) - poet, philosopher, writer, professor and politician
- Remigio Crespo Toral (1860–1939) - poet, journalist, politician
- José de la Cuadra (1903–1941) - novelist, short story writer
- Agustin Cueva (1937–1992) - writer and sociologist
- César Dávila Andrade (1918–1967)- poet
- Jorge Dávila Vázquez (b. 1947) - writer
- Rafael Díaz Ycaza (1925–2013) - poet, novelist, short story writer
- Miguel Donoso Pareja (1931–2015) - poet, novelist, short story writer
- Marcelo Dotti (1942-2026) - journalist, politician
- Bolívar Echeverría (1941-2010)- philosopher
- José María Egas (1896–1982) - poet
- Gonzalo Escudero (1903–1971) - poet and diplomat
- Eugenio Espejo (1747–1795) - writer
- Ileana Espinel (1933–2001) - poet
- Aurelio Espinosa Pólit (1894–1961) - writer, poet, and translator
- Alfonso Espinosa de los Monteros (b. 1941) - TV journalist, holder of a Guinness Record for longest continuous time as a news anchor
- Aurora Estrada y Ayala (1901–1967) - poet
- Jenny Estrada (b. 1940) - writer and journalist
- Ulises Estrella (1939–2014) - poet, film expert
- Nelson Estupiñán Bass (1912–2002) - poet
- Jacinto de Evia (1625–1700s) - poet, priest
- Ángel Felicísimo Rojas (1909–2003) - writer, novelist, and poet
- Humberto Fierro (1890–1929) - poet
- Luis Enrique Fierro (b. 1936) - poet and medical doctor
- Jaime Galarza Zavala (b. 1930) - writer, poet, journalist and politician
- Joaquín Gallegos Lara (1909–1947) - novelist and short story writer
- Karina Galvez (b. 1964) - poet
- Alfredo Gangotena (1904–1944) - poet who wrote in French and Spanish
- Enrique Gil Gilbert (1912–1973) - writer
- Federico González Suárez (1844–1917) - bishop, historian
- Euler Granda (1935–2018) - novelist
- Francisco Granizo Ribadeneira (1925–2009) - poet
- Yanna Hadatty (b. 1969) - short story writer and essayist
- Horacio Hidrovo Peñaherrera (1931–2012) - poet and writer
- Horacio Hidrovo Velásquez (1902–1962) - poet, novelist and short story writer
- Janet Hinostroza (b. 1971) - journalist and TV presenter
- Gilda Holst (1952–2024) - writer
- Jorge Icaza Coronel (1906–1978) - writer
- María Angélica Idrobo (1890–1956) - writer, educator
- Edna Iturralde (b. 1948) - writer
- Efraín Jara Idrovo (1926–2018) - poet and writer
- Carlos Eduardo Jaramillo Castillo (b. 1932) - poet
- Nicolás Kingman Riofrío (1918–2018) - journalist, writer and politician
- Juan Larrea Holguín (1927–2006) - writer and lawyer
- Numa Pompilio Llona (1832–1907) - poet
- Violeta Luna (b. 1943) - poet
- Sonia Manzano Vela (b. 1947) - writer and pianist
- Luis A. Martínez (1869–1909) - novelist
- Nela Martínez (1912–2004) - writer
- José Martínez Queirolo (1931–2008) - playwright
- Hugo Mayo (1895–1988) - poet and writer
- José Trajano Mera (1862–1919) - poet and playwright
- Juan León Mera (1832–1894) - writer
- Pedro Moncayo (1807–1888) - political journalist
- Juan Montalvo (1832–1889) - writer
- Ernesto Noboa y Caamaño (1889–1927) - poet
- Jorge Núñez Sánchez (1947–2020) - writer
- José Joaquín de Olmedo (1780–1847) - poet, politician
- Adalberto Ortiz (1914–2003) - writer and poet
- Elisa Ortiz de Aulestia (1909–1991) - teacher and writer
- Emilio Palacio (b. 1954) - journalist
- Alfredo Pareja Diezcanseco (1908–1993) - writer, historian, academician, politician and diplomat
- Julio Pazos Barrera (b. 1944) - poet and writer
- Galo René Pérez (1923–2008) - biographer, poet, and essayist
- Jorge Pérez Concha (1908–1995) - writer and historian
- Ismael Pérez Pazmiño (1876–1944) - journalist, businessman
- Rodolfo Pérez Pimentel (b. 1939) - biographer
- Victoria Puig de Lange (1916–2008) - journalist
- Aleyda Quevedo (b. 1972) - writer
- Ernesto Quiñonez (b. 1969) - novelist
- Edmundo Ribadeneira Meneses (1920–2004) - writer
- Víctor Manuel Rendón (1859–1940) - writer
- Óscar Efrén Reyes (1896–1966)
- Miguel Riofrío (1822–1879) - writer
- Juan Manuel Rodríguez (b. 1945) - Spanish-Ecuadorian writer
- Gonzalo Rubio Orbe (1909–1994) - Anthropologist and writer
- Alfonso Rumazo González (1903–2002) - writer, historian, essayist and literary critic
- José Rumazo González (b. 1904) - poet
- Hugo Salazar Tamariz (1923–1999) - poet, novelist and playwright
- Natasha Salguero (b. 1952) - writer, journalist
- Isacovici Salomon (1924–1998) - writer
- Filoteo Samaniego (1928–2013) - novelist, poet, historian, translator, and diplomat
- Medardo Ángel Silva (1898–1919) - poet
- Dolores Sucre (1837–1917) - poet
- Fernando Tinajero (b. 1940) - writer
- Francisco Tobar García (1928–1997) - poet, novelist, and playwright
- Mercedes González Tola (1860–1911) - poet and feminist
- Abdón Ubidia (b. 1944) - novelist
- Zoila Ugarte de Landívar (1864–1969) - journalist
- Benjamín Urrutia (b. 1950) - writer
- Juan Valdano Morejón (1939–2021) - writer
- Leonardo Valencia (b. 1969) - writer
- Eduardo Varas (b. 1979) - novelist and journalist
- Fray José María Vargas O.P. (1902–1988) - writer and historian
- Javier Vásconez (b. 1946) - novelist and short story writer
- Marieta de Veintemilla (1855–1907) - writer, politician
- Dolores Veintimilla (1829–1857) - poet
- Juan de Velasco (1727–1792) - poet, historian
- Jorge Velasco Mackenzie (1949–2021) - writer
- Pedro Jorge Vera (1914–1999) - writer
- Raquel Verdesoto (1910–1999) - poet, biographer, teacher, feminist activist
- Gaspar de Villarroel (1587–1665) - bishop, apologist
- Humberto Vinueza (1942–2017) - poet
- Alicia Yánez Cossío (b. 1928) - novelist
- Gonzalo Zaldumbide (1884–1965) - poet

=== Visual arts ===
- Alba Calderón - painter
- Alfredo Palacio Moreno - sculptor
- Aníbal Villacís - painter
- Araceli Gilbert - painter
- Bernardo de Legarda - sculptor
- Caesar Andrade Faini - painter
- Camilo Egas - painter
- Eduardo Kingman - painter
- Enrique Tábara - painter
- Estuardo Maldonado - sculptor and painter
- Félix Aráuz - painter
- Galo Galecio - painter
- Gonzalo Amancha - painter
- Gonzalo Endara Crow - painter
- Hugo Cifuentes - photographer and painter
- Jaime Andrade Moscoso - sculptor
- Joaquín Pinto - painter
- Jorge Velarde - painter
- Jorge Swett - muralist, painter, lawyer and writer
- Juan Villafuerte - painter
- Judith Gutierrez - painter
- Leonardo Tejada - painter
- Luigi Stornaiolo Pimentel - painter
- Luis Cadena - painter
- Luis Miranda - painter
- Luis Molinari - painter
- Manuel Chili "Caspicara" - sculptor
- Manuel Rendón - painter
- Marcelo Tejada - painter
- Marcos Restrepo - printer
- Miguel Betancourt - painter
- Olga Fisch - artist, collector, folklorist, born in Hungary
- Oswaldo Guayasamín - painter
- Oswaldo Moreno - painter
- Oswaldo Muñoz Mariño - painter and architect
- Oswaldo Viteri - painter
- Patricio Cueva Jaramillo - painter
- Ramón Piaguaje - painter
- Theo Constanté - painter
- Washington Iza - painter
- Yela Loffredo - sculptor

=== Dance ===
- Frederick Ashton - Ecuadorian born British ballet dancer and choreographer
- Noralma Vera - director of the National Dance Institute (Instituto Nacional de Danza)
- Esperanza Cruz Hidalgo - ballerina

=== Theater, TV and film ===
- Ernesto Albán - vaudeville and television actor
- Danilo Carrera - actor
- Enrique Chediak - cinematographer in Hollywood
- Camilo Coba - filmmaker
- Sebastián Cordero - film director/writer/editor
- Paola Farías - actress, model
- Katty García - actress
- Ricardo Hoyos - actor
- Carolina Jaume - actress, TV host
- Mike Judge - Ecuadorian born American animator
- Camilo Luzuriaga - film director, writer, and producer
- Priscilla Negrón - actress
- Flor María Palomeque - actress, model
- Albert Paulsen - actor
- Jenn Pinto - actress; Ecuadorian/Puerto Rican American
- Fatima Ptacek - actress and model
- Marián Sabaté - TV personality; born in Spain
- Diego Spotorno - actor, host
- Michael Steger - actor
- Juan Emilio Viguié - pioneering Puerto Rican movie producer (Ecuadorian mother)

=== Music ===
- Adrianne León - singer-songwriter, American of Ecuadorian and Puerto Rican descent, lived in Ecuador.
- Adrienne Bailon - singer 3LW; Ecuadorian/Puerto Rican
- Ángel Leonidas Araújo Chiriboga - composer
- Antonio Neumane - French, lived and worked in Ecuador, composed the music of the National Anthem of Ecuador
- Arturo Rodas - classical composer
- Beatriz Parra Durango - classical musician
- Boris Cepeda - pianist
- Carlos Bonilla Chávez - guitarist, composer
- Carlos Rubira Infante - singer-songwriter
- Celia Zaldumbide Rosales - pianist
- Christopher Vélez - singer-songwriter and dancer (CNCO)
- Christina Aguilera - singer and pop icon (half Ecuadorian, half German, Irish, Welsh, and Dutch ancestry)
- Diego Luzuriaga - composer
- Edgar Palacios Rodriguez - composer
- Enrique Espín Yépez - composer, violinist
- Fausto Miño - singer-songwriter
- Gabriela Villalba - singer
- Gerardo - singer
- Guillermo Ayoví Erazo, aka Papá Roncón - Afro-Ecuadorian musician, singer, and marimba player
- Isabel Rosales Pareja - pianist
- Jinsop - Korean/American singer, Ecuadorian nationality by naturalization
- Jorge Araujo Chiriboga - composer
- Jorge Saade - violinist
- Juan Fernando Velasco - singer-songwriter
- Hilda Murillo - singer
- Fresia Saavedra - singer
- Carlota Jaramillo - singer
- Julio Jaramillo - folklore and romantic music singer
- Wendy Vera - singer, politician
- Leo Rojas - musician
- Leslie Wright - pianist
- Luis Humberto Salgado - classical composer
- Luis Silva Parra - saxophonist of classical jazz
- Mesias Maiguashca - classical composer
- Nicasio Safadi - songwriter, popular musician, born in Lebanon
- Paulina Aguirre - Christian singer
- Sebastian J. - music producer, songwriter
- Sixto María Durán Cárdenas - pianist, composer, lawyer, singer
- Lila Álvarez Garcia - pianist, choir director, and musical art teacher

== Science ==
- Antonio de Alcedo - Spanish geographer and military leader, born in what is today Ecuador
- Eugenia Del Pino - developmental biologist
- Pedro Vicente Maldonado - geographer
- Clodoveo Carrión Mora - paleontologist and naturalist
- Misael Acosta Solís - naturalist
- William Jameson - physician, naturalist; born in Scotland
- Augusto Nicolás Martínez - agronomist, geologist
- Plutarco Naranjo Vargas - doctor and scientific researcher
- Luis Sodiro - botanist, priest; born in Italy
- Presley Norton Yoder - archeologist

== Medicine ==
- José Amén-Palma - surgeon and researcher
- Germán Abad Valenzuela - doctor, radiologist
- Eugenio Espejo (1747–1795) - physician, journalist, writer, philosopher
- Rodrigo Fierro Benítez - physician, researcher, writer
- Fernando Jurado Noboa - physician, genealogist
- Alejo Lascano Bahamonde - physician, surgeon
- Juan Tanca Marengo - physician, minister

== Politics and military ==
- Pamela Aguirre Zambonino (born 1984) - member of Andean Parliament
- Belisario Albán Mestanza (1853–1925) - notable role in the Liberal Revolution of Guayaquil
- Humberto Albornoz (1894–1959) - member of a provisional government junta in 1926
- Francisco Arízaga Luque - member of a provisional junta in 1925
- Ana Lucía Armijos (born 1949) - first female interior minister
- Pedro José de Arteta (1797–1893) - vice-president
- Leopoldo Benites (1905–1996) - diplomat, writer, president of the United Nations General Assembly
- Diego Borja - Coordination Minister for Economic Policy, president of the Poder Ciudadano Movement
- Diana Coloma - blind disability activist and politician
- Dolores Cacuango - left-wing indigenous activist
- Abdón Calderón Garaycoa - soldier in the war of independence
- Manuela Cañizares (1769–1814) - early leader of the independence movement
- Rafael Carvajal (1819–1878) - politician, minister
- Galo Chiriboga - minister, prosecutor, felon
- Pacífico Chiriboga (1810–1886) - politician, legislator, vice president
- Carlos Cueva Tamariz (1898–1991) - politician, senator, legislator, councilman to the city of Cuenca, Ambassador to UN, Secretary of Labor
- Alberto Dahik (born 1953) - vice president, professor and businessman
- José Javier Eguiguren - politician, minister
- Freddy Ehlers (born 1945) - journalist, minister, presidential candidate
- Fander Falconí (born 1962) - public servant
- Juan Falconí Puig - public servant, diplomat
- Luis Félix López (1932–2008) - prominent politician, minister
- Manuel Félix López (1937–2004) - prominent politician in Manabí province
- José Fernández Salvador - politician, jurist
- Guillermo Franco (1811–1873) - self-proclaimed dictator, major figure in the Ecuadorian political and military scene
- Jorge Glas - vice president, convicted felon
- Luisa Gómez de la Torre Páez (1887–1976) - socialist activist
- Susana González Rosado (born 1973) - assembly member, vice prefect of Guayas Province
- Matilde Hidalgo (1889–1974) - activist, physician, first Ecuadorian woman to finish secondary education, first Ecuadorian woman to complete a degree in medicine *
- Alonso de Illescas (c. 1528-1600) - cimarron leader
- Francisco Illingworth (1905–1982) - Vice President of Ecuador
- María Leonor Jiménez (born 1939) - candidate, public servant
- María Cristina Kronfle (born 1985) - member of the Constituent Assembly and National Assembly for Guayas Province
- José de La Mar - Independentist military leader, president of Peru (born in what is now Ecuador)
- Gustavo Larrea (born 1956) - politician
- Lidice Larrea (born c. 1973) – Minister of Economic and Social Inclusion
- Francisco León - minister, Vice president
- Richelieu Levoyer - Army general, proposed the "Return to the Constitution Plan" that ended the 1976–1979 dictatorship
- Guadalupe Llori - public servant
- Guillaume Long - French-born minister
- Luis Macas - legislator, minister
- Federico Malo Andrade - governor, entrepreneur
- Eduardo Maruri - assembly member for the Guayas Province
- Paco Moncayo - Army general, former mayor of Quito, Congressman
- Mayra Montaño - ex radio presenter, National assembly member, councillor
- Carlos de Montúfar (1780-1816) - military leader during the independence struggle
- Juan Pío Montúfar, marquis of Selva Alegre - President of the First Government Junta of independent Quito
- Debbie Mucarsel-Powell - Ecuadorian-born member of the United States House of Representatives, representing Florida; first person born in South America to reach the United States Congress
- Jaime Nebot - political leader, major of Guayaquil
- Xavier Neira Menéndez - legislator, presidential candidate
- Alexandra Ocles - politician and educator
- Nina Pacari - minister, congresswoman, indigenous activist
- Álvaro Noboa - millionaire, political leader, frequent presidential candidate
- Ricardo Paredes Romero - communist politician
- Antonio Parra Velasco - Ambassador to France and Great Britain
- Ricardo Patiño - politician
- Rodrigo Paz - mayor of Quito, minister, entrepreneur, sports executive
- Pedro Pinto Rubianes - minister, vice president
- Rafael Pólit - diplomat, governor
- León Roldós Aguilera - former vice president of Ecuador, leader of the RED political movement
- Manuela Sáenz - involved in the independence movement, Simón Bolívar's lover and confidant
- Julio Teodoro Salem - politician
- Jorge Salvador Lara - Ambassador to the Vatican, Peru, Chile, and France, former Foreign Minister of Ecuador
- Juan de Salinas y Zenitagoya - early independence leader
- José Serrano - president of the Legislature, minister
- Andrés Vallejo (born 1942) - prominent politician, president of the National Congress
- Luis Vargas Torres (1844–1887) - politician, guerrilla
- Alexandra Vela - minister, legislator
- Alfredo Vera Arrata - politician and architect, minister of education, councilman to the city of Quito, Anti-Corruption Secretary
- Alfredo Vera Vera (1910–1999) - politician
- José de Villamil - a leader of the struggle for independence, considered the father of the Ecuadorian Navy; born in Louisiana
- Rosa Zárate - independentist leader

=== Indigenous leaders ===
- Atahualpa - Inca emperor, perhaps born in what is today Ecuador
- Rumiñawi - high-ranking Incan warrior around the time of the Spanish conquest
- Chalcuchima - high-ranking Incan warrior
- Fernando Daquilema - indigenous rebel from the 19th century

=== Presidents ===
- Juan José Flores - first president (1830–1835; 1839–1843; 1843–1845), Venezuelan-born
- Vicente Rocafuerte - president (1834–1839)
- José Joaquín de Olmedo - president (1845–1845)
- Vicente Ramón Roca - president (1845–1849), first vice president (1830–1831)
- Manuel de Ascásubi - interim president (1849–1850, 1869)
- Diego Noboa - president (1850–1851)
- José María Urvina - supreme chief and president (1851–1856)
- Francisco Robles - president (1856–1859)
- Gabriel García Moreno - president (1860–1865; 1869–1875)
- Jerónimo Carrión - president (1865–1867)
- Javier Espinosa - president (1868–1869)
- Antonio Borrero - president (1875–1876)
- Ignacio de Veintemilla - dictator and president (1876–1883)
- José Plácido Caamaño - president (1883–1888)
- Antonio Flores Jijón - president (1888–1892)
- Luis Cordero Crespo - president (1892–1895)
- Vicente Lucio Salazar - president (1895)
- Eloy Alfaro - supreme chief and president (1895–1901)
- Leonidas Plaza - president (1901–1905; 1912–1916)
- Lizardo García - president (1905–1906)
- Emilio Estrada Carmona - president (1911)
- Carlos Freile Zaldumbide - interim president (1911–1912)
- Francisco Andrade Marín - interim president (1912)
- Alfredo Baquerizo - president (1916–1920)
- José Luis Tamayo - president (1920–1924)
- Gonzalo Córdova - president (1924–1925)
- Isidro Ayora - president (1926–1931)
- Luis Larrea Alba - general, president de facto in 1931
- Alberto Guerrero Martínez - provisional president (1932)
- Juan de Dios Martínez - president (1932–1933)
- Abelardo Montalvo - president (1933–1934)
- José María Velasco Ibarra - president (1934–1935; 1944–1947; 1952–1956; 1968–1972)
- Federico Páez - supreme chief and president (1935–1937)
- Alberto Enríquez Gallo - military dictator (1937–1938)
- Manuel María Borrero - interim president (1938)
- Aurelio Mosquera - president (1938-1939)
- Andrés Córdova - president (1939-1940)
- Julio Enrique Moreno - interim president (1940)
- Carlos Alberto Arroyo del Río - president (1940–1944)
- Carlos Mancheno Cajas - military dictator for a brief period (1947)
- Mariano Suárez - president for a brief period (1947)
- Carlos Julio Arosemena Tola - president (1947-48)
- Galo Plaza Lasso - president (1948–1952)
- Camilo Ponce Enríquez - president (1956–1960)
- Carlos Julio Arosemena Monroy - president (1961–1963)
- Ramón Castro Jijón - president of the military junta (1963–1966)
- Clemente Yerovi - president (1966)
- Otto Arosemena - president (1966–1968)
- Guillermo Rodríguez Lara - military dictator (1972–1976)
- Jaime Roldós Aguilera - president (1979–1981)
- Osvaldo Hurtado - president (1981–1984)
- Leon Febres Cordero - president (1984–1988)
- Rodrigo Borja Cevallos - president (1988–1992)
- Sixto Durán Ballén - president (1992–1996)
- Abdalá Bucaram - president (1996–1997), convicted felon
- Jamil Mahuad - president (1998–2000)
- Gustavo Noboa - president (2000–2003)
- Lucio Gutiérrez - president (2003–2005)
- Alfredo Palacio - president (2005–2007)
- Rafael Correa - president (2007–2017), convicted felon
- Lenin Moreno - president (2017–2021), former vice president (2007–2013)
- Guillermo Lasso - president (2021–)

=== First ladies ===
- Mercedes Jijón - wife of Juan José Flores
- Teresa Jado - wife of José María Urbina
- Corina del Parral - wife of José María Velasco Ibarra, born in Argentina
- Lucila Santos Trujillo - wife of Otto Arosemena
- Martha Bucaram - wife of Jaime Roldós
- Ximena Bohórquez - wife of Lucio Gutiérrez
- María de Lourdes Alcívar - wife of Guillermo Lasso

== Religious figures ==
- Catalina de Jesús Herrera – Dominican prioress, nun, writer
- Carlos María de la Torre - cardinal
- Bernardino Echeverría Ruiz - archbishop of Guayaquil
- Leonidas Proaño - bishop of Riobamba
- José Mario Ruiz Navas - archbishop of Portoviejo
- Mariana de Jesús Torres - abbess of Conceptionist Monastery of Quito, Servant of God
- Luis Alberto Luna Tobar - archbishop of Cuenca
- Pedro Bedón - priest, painter, polemicist

=== Saints ===
- Mariana de Jesús de Paredes - mystic, saint
- Mercedes de Jesús Molina - mystic, blessed
- Miguel Febres Cordero - religious brother, saint
- Narcisa de Jesús - mystic, saint

== Sports ==
- Álex Aguinaga - footballer and coach
- Jordy Alcívar - footballer
- Alexander Alvarado - footballer
- Nilson Angulo - footballer
- Rorys Aragón - footballer
- Robert Arboleda - footballer
- Samantha Arévalo - swimmer
- Xavier Arreaga - footballer
- Walter Ayoví - footballer
- Mimi Barona - surfer
- Christian Benítez - footballer
- Shirley Berruz - footballer
- Andrea Bonilla - long-distance runner
- Chico Borja - Ecuadorian-American footballer and coach
- Ramiro Borja - footballer, Ecuadorian-born, represented Puerto Rico internationally
- Elizabeth Bravo - triathlete
- Beder Caicedo - footballer
- Carina Caicedo - footballer
- Felipe Caicedo - footballer
- Jean Caicedo - boxer
- Jonathan Caicedo - cyclist
- Jordy Caicedo - footballer
- Moisés Caicedo - footballer
- Leonardo Campana - footballer
- Pablo Campana - tennis player and public servant
- Alfredo Campo - BMX cyclist
- Richard Carapaz - cyclist, winner of the Giro d'Italia, gold medal winner at the 2020 Olympics
- Byron Castillo - footballer
- Julio Castillo - boxer
- Miler Castillo (born 1987) - football player
- Jefferson Alveiro Cepeda - cyclist
- Rosa Chacha - long-distance runner
- Vanessa Chalá - judoka
- Andrés Chocho - race walker
- José Cifuentes - footballer
- Juan Manuel Correa - racing driver
- Neisi Dájomes - weightlifter, gold medal winner at the 2020 Olympics
- Daniela Darquea - golfer
- Ulises de la Cruz - footballer and politician
- Agustín Delgado - footballer and politician, scored first Ecuadorian goal in a World Cup
- Anicka Delgado - swimmer
- Diana Durango - sport shooter
- Iván Enderica Ochoa - swimmer
- Alexandra Escobar - weightlifter
- Gonzalo Escobar - tennis player
- Adriana Espinosa - archer
- Michael Estrada - footballer
- Pervis Estupiñán - footballer
- Alan Franco - footballer
- Hernán Galíndez - footballer (born in Argentina)
- Estefania García - judoka
- Fricson George - footballer
- Andrés Gómez - tennis player, French Open winner
- Emilio Gómez - tennis player
- Carlos Góngora - boxer, IBO world champion
- Doménica González - tennis player
- Carlos Gruezo Arboleda - footballer
- Carlos Gruezo Quiñónez - footballer
- Piero Hincapié - footballer
- Romario Ibarra - footballer
- Eduardo Hurtado - footballer
- Elías Jácome - football referee, the first Ecuadorian to officiate in a World Cup
- Karla Jaramillo - race walker
- Iván Kaviedes - footballer
- Fausto Klinger - footballer
- Martin Klinger - footballer
- Orly Klinger - footballer
- Nicolás Lapentti - tennis player
- Giovanni Lapentti - tennis player
- Juan Madruñero - footballer
- Ángel Mena - footballer
- Édison Méndez - footballer
- Sebas Méndez - footballer
- John Mercado - footballer
- Alberto Miño - table tennis player
- Glenda Morejón - race walker
- Jhonatan Narváez - cyclist
- Christian Noboa - footballer
- Alfonso Obregón - footballer
- Joel Ordóñez - footballer
- Érika Pachito - boxer
- Joffre Pachito - footballer
- Willian Pacho - footballer
- Angie Palacios - weightlifter
- Diego Palacios - footballer
- Andrea Pérez Peña - sport shooter
- Jefferson Pérez - race walker, gold medal winner of the 20 km race walk at the 1996 Olympics
- Paola Pérez - race walker
- Tomas Peribonio - swimmer
- Brian Pintado - race walker, Olympic champion
- Gonzalo Plata - footballer
- Joao Plata - footballer
- Jackson Porozo - footballer
- Angelo Preciado - footballer
- Ayrton Preciado - footballer
- Lenin Preciado - judoka
- Álex Quiñónez - sprinter
- Roberto Quiroz - tennis player
- Cristian Ramírez - footballer
- Djorkaeff Reasco - footballer
- Kevin Rodríguez - footballer
- Tamara Salazar - weightlifter, medalist at the 2020 Summer Olympics
- Jeremy Sarmiento - footballer, born in Spain
- Hugo Savinovich - professional wrestler in the United States and Puerto Rico
- Pancho Segura - Ecuadorian-American tennis player, among the top players in his generation
- Alberto Spencer - footballer, best remembered for his time at Peñarol. Top all-time Copa Libertadores scorer.
- Abraham Suárez - diver
- Nelson Suarez - diver
- Ángela Tenorio - sprinter
- Carlos Tenorio - footballer
- Félix Torres - footballer
- Patricio Urrutia - footballer and politician, captained the successful L.D.U. Quito team which won Copa Libertadores
- Anthony Valencia - footballer
- Antonio Valencia - footballer, best known for his time at Manchester United F.C., only Manchester United captain from outside Europe
- Enner Valencia - footballer
- Joel Valencia - footballer, has also represented Spain on youth levels
- Iván Vallejo - mountaineer and public servant
- Luisa Valverde - freestyle wrestler
- Marlon Vera - mixed martial arts fighter
- Rolando Vera - long-distance runner
- Claudio Villanueva - race walker
- Petter Villegas - footballer, Ecuadorian-born, represented Puerto Rico internationally
- Nicolas Wettstein - eventing rider (born in Switzerland, represented Ecuador internationally)
- Lucía Yépez - wrestler
- Octavio Zambrano - football coach, known mostly for his career at Major League Soccer

== Other ==
- Lorena Bobbitt - Ecuadorian-American woman made famous after assaulting her husband
- María Capovilla (1889–2006) - supercentenarian, at one time the oldest living person in the world
- Mariana Carcelén (1805–1861) - aristocrat, Marchioness, wife of independence leader Antonio José de Sucre and as such First Lady of Bolivia
- Martina Carrillo - 18th-century anti-slavery activist
- Blanca Chancoso (born 1955) - indigenous activist
- Magdalena Dávalos y Maldonado - aristocrat, intellectual, patron of the arts
- Nexar Antonio Flores (born 1978) - Ecuadorian-Finnish fashion stylist and makeup artist
- Geraldina Guerra Garcés (born 1975) - campaigner against femicide
- Juan Fernando Hermosa (1976-1996) - career criminal and serial killer
- Jacinto Jijón y Caamaño - aristocrat, archaeologist, politician
- Yolanda Kakabadse - environmentalist activist
- Hortensia Mata - socialite and philanthropist
- Manuel Muñoz Borrero - diplomat, considered Righteous Among the Nations for his role in saving Jewish people during the Holocaust
- Zonia Palán Tamayo (1954–2003) - economist and women's rights activist
- Faustino Rayo - Colombian-born merchant and assassin, known for murdering Gabriel García Moreno
- Nelson Serrano - Ecuadorian-American businessman convicted of murder
- Delary Stoffers - beauty pageant winner, Miss Ecuador 2023
- Hernán Crespo Toral - architect, archaeologist
- Isabel Godin des Odonais - traveler
