= List of Spanish-language authors =

This is a list of Spanish-language authors, organized by country.

== Argentina ==
- Roberto Arlt (1900–1942)
- Adolfo Bioy Casares (1914–1999)
- Jorge Luis Borges (1899–1986)
- Sergio Chejfec (1956–2022)
- Julio Cortázar (1914–1984)
- Esteban Echeverría (1805–1851)
- Juana Manuela Gorriti (1818–1892)
- José Hernández (1834–1886)
- Sylvia Iparraguirre (born 1947)
- Alicia Jurado (1922–2011)
- Leopoldo Lugones (1874–1938)
- Manuel Mujica Láinez (1910–1984)
- Ricardo Piglia (1941–2017)
- Manuel Puig (1932–1990)
- Ernesto Sabato (1911–2011)
- Domingo Faustino Sarmiento (1811–1888)
- Ana Maria Shua (born 1951)
- Alfonsina Storni (1892–1938)
- Patricio Sturlese (born 1973)
- Héctor Tizón (1929–2012)
- Luisa Valenzuela (born 1938)

== Bolivia ==
- Marcelo Quiroga Santa Cruz (1931–1980)
- Gigia Talarico (born 1953)

== Chile ==
- Isabel Allende (born 1942)
- Eduardo Anguita (1914–1992)
- Roberto Bolaño (1953–2003)
- José Baroja (born 1983)
- María Luisa Bombal (1910–1980)
- José Donoso (1924–1996)
- Ariel Dorfman (born 1942)
- Jorge Edwards (1931–2023)
- Diamela Eltit (born 1949)
- Alberto Fuguet (born 1964)
- Gustavo Gac-Artigas (born 1944)
- Olga Grau (born 1945)
- Vicente Huidobro (1893–1948)
- Enrique Lihn (1929–1988)
- Sergio Missana (born 1968)
- Gabriela Mistral (1889–1957)
- Pablo Neruda (1904–1973)
- Rosario Orrego (1834–1879)
- Gonzalo Rojas (1916–2011)
- Manuel Rojas (1896–1973)
- Antonio Skármeta (1940–2024)
- Luis Sepúlveda (1949–2020)
- Marcela Serrano (born 1951)
- Lucrecia Undurraga Solar (1841–1901)

== Colombia ==
- Andrés Caicedo (1951–1977)
- Gabriel García Márquez (1927–2014)
- Jorge Isaacs (1837–1895)
- Álvaro Mutis (1923–2013)
- Rafael Pombo (1833–1912)
- José Eustasio Rivera (1888–1928)
- Fernando Soto Aparicio (1933–2016)
- Fernando Vallejo (born 1942)
- Samael Aun Weor (1917–1977)
- Héctor Abad Faciolince (born 1958)
- Gustavo Álvarez Gardeazábal (born 1945)
- Gonzalo Arango Arias (1931–1976)
- Porfirio Barba-Jacob (1883–1942)
- Tomás Carrasquilla (1858–1940)
- Germán Castro Caycedo (1940–2021)
- Manuel Mejía Vallejo (1923–1998)
- Jairo Aníbal Niño (1941–2010)
- Laura Restrepo (born 1950)
- Olga Elena Mattei (born 1933)
- José Eustasio Rivera (1888–1928)
- Daniel Samper Pizano (born 1945)
- José Asunción Silva (1865–1896)
- José María Vargas Vila (1860–1933)
- Albalucía Angel (born 1939)
- Magdalena León de Leal (born 1939)
- Fanny Buitrago (born 1943)
- Jorge Franco (born 1962)

== Costa Rica ==
- Manuel Argüello Mora (1834–1902)
- Alfonso Chase (born 1945)
- Fabián Dobles (1918–1997)
- Quince Duncan (born 1940)
- Carlos Luis Fallas (1909–1966)
- Carlos Gagini (1865–1925)
- Joaquín García Monge (1881–1958)
- Manuel González Zeledón ("Magón") (1864–1936)
- Max Jiménez (1900–1947)
- Tatiana Lobo (1939–2023)
- Carmen Lyra (1888–1949)
- José Marín Cañas (1904–1981)
- Carmen Naranjo (1928–2012)
- Julieta Pinto (1921–2022)
- Emilia Prieto Tugores (1902–1986)
- José León Sánchez (1929–2022)
- Rodrigo Soto (born 1962)

== Cuba ==
- Brígida Agüero y Agüero (1837–1866)
- Reinaldo Arenas (1943–1990)
- Miguel Barnet (born 1940)
- Guillermo Cabrera Infante (1929–2005)
- Alejo Carpentier (1904–1980)
- Daína Chaviano (born 1957)
- Enrique Cirules (1938–2016)
- Domitila García Doménico de Coronado (1847–1938)
- Gertrudis Gómez de Avellaneda (1814–1873)
- Nicolás Guillén (1902–1989)
- José Lezama Lima (1910–1976)
- Dulce María Loynaz (1902–1997)
- José Martí (1853–1895)
- Leonardo Padura Fuentes (born 1955)
- Gonzalo de Quesada (1496/1506 or 1509–1579)
- Ernesto Juan Castellanos (born 1963)
- Severo Sarduy (1937–1993)
- Zoé Valdés (born 1959)

== Dominican Republic ==
- Fabio Fiallo (1866–1942)
- Pedro Henríquez Ureña (1884–1946)
- Juan Bosch (1909–2001)
- Joaquín Balaguer (1909–2002)
- Pedro Mir (1913–2000)
- Alfredo Fernández Simó (1915–1991)
- Junot Díaz (born 1970)

== Ecuador ==
- Abdón Ubidia, (born 1944), novelist
- Adalberto Ortiz (1914–2003), novelist, poet and diplomat
- Agustin Cueva (1937–1992), literary critic and sociologist
- Alejandro Carrión Aguirre (1915–1992), poet, novelist and journalist
- Alfonso Rumazo González (1903–2002), historian, essayist and literary critic
- Alfredo Gangotena – poet who wrote in French and Spanish
- Alfredo Pareja Diezcanseco (1908–1993), novelist, essayist, journalist, historian
- Alicia Yánez Cossío (born 1928), poet, novelist and journalist
- Ángel Felicísimo Rojas (1909–2003), novelist, and poet
- Arturo Borja (1892–1912), poet
- Aurelio Espinosa Pólit (1894–1961), poet, translator
- Benjamín Carrión Mora (1897–1979), writer
- Benjamín Urrutia (born 1950), author and scholar
- Carlos Altamirano Sánchez – poet and journalist
- Carlos Eduardo Jaramillo Castillo – poet
- Carmen Acevedo Vega – poet and writer
- Dolores Veintimilla (1829–1857), poet
- Edmundo Ribadeneira Meneses (1920–2004), writer and university professor
- Eduardo Varas – novelist and journalist
- Efraín Jara Idrovo – poet and writer
- Enrique Gil Gilbert (1912–1973), novelist, journalist, poet
- Ernesto Noboa y Caamaño – poet
- Eugenio Espejo (1747–1795), writer and lawyer
- Euler Granda (1935–2018), poet, novelist
- Fanny Carrión de Fierro – poet, essayist and professor
- Filoteo Samaniego – novelist, poet, historian, translator, and diplomat
- Francisco Tobar Garcia – poet, novelist, and playwright
- Gabriel Cevallos García – writer and historian
- Galo René Pérez – biographer, poet, and essayist
- Horacio Hidrovo Peñaherrera – poet and writer
- Horacio Hidrovo Velásquez – poet, novelist and short story writer
- Hugo Mayo (1895–1988), poet
- Humberto Fierro – poet
- Isacovici Salomon (1924–1998), writer
- Iván Carvajal (born 1948), poet, philosopher, writer
- Jaime Galarza Zavala – poet, journalist and politician
- Jenny Estrada – Writer and journalist
- Joaquín Gallegos Lara – novelist and short story writer
- Jorge Carrera Andrade – poet
- Jorge Icaza Coronel (1906–1978), novelist
- Jorge Luis Cáceres (born 1982), editor, anthologist
- Jorge Núñez Sánchez (1947–2020), writer, historian and professor
- Jorge Pérez Concha (1908–1995), historian, biographer, writer and diplomat
- José de la Cuadra – novelist and short story writer
- José Joaquín de Olmedo – poet
- José Martínez Queirolo – playwright
- Fray José María Vargas O.P. (1902–1988), writer and historian
- José Rumazo González – poet
- Juan Bautista Aguirre y Carbo (1725–1786), poet
- Juan Larrea Holguín (1927–2006), writer and lawyer
- Juan León Mera (1832–1894), essayist, novelist, politician
- Juan Manuel Rodríguez (born 1945), professor and author
- Juan Montalvo (1832–1889), author and essayist
- Julio Pazos Barrera (born 1944), poet
- Karina Galvez (born 1964), poet
- Luis Alberto Costales – poet, philosopher, writer, professor and politician
- Luis Enrique Fierro (born 1936), poet and medical doctor
- Medardo Ángel Silva – poet
- Miguel Donoso Pareja – poet, novelist, and short-story writer
- Nela Martínez (1912–2004), activist, and writer
- Nelson Estupiñán Bass (1912–2002), poet
- Nicolás Kingman Riofrío – journalist, writer and politician
- Numa Pompilio Llona (1832–1907), poet, journalist, educator, diplomat, and philosopher
- Octavio Cordero Palacios – playwright, poet, mathematician, lawyer, professor and inventor
- Pedro Jorge Vera (1914–1999), writer and politician
- Rafael Díaz Ycaza – poet, novelist, and short story writer
- Raquel Verdesoto – poet, biographer, teacher, feminist activist
- Raúl Andrade Moscoso (1905–1983), journalist and playwright
- Rodolfo Pérez Pimentel (born 1939), biographer
- Sonia Manzano Vela (born 1947), writer and pianist
- Ulises Estrella (1939–2014), poet, film expert
- Víctor Manuel Rendón (1859–1940), poet, novelist, playwright, biographer, translator

== Ecuatorial Guinea ==
- María Nsué Angüe (1945–2017)
- Juan Balboa Boneke (1938–2014)
- Juan Tomás Ávila Laurel (born 1966)
- Donato Ndongo-Bidyogo (born 1950)
- Raquel Ilombé (¿1938?–1992)
- Justo Bolekia Boleká
- Leoncio Evita Enoy (1929–1996)

== El Salvador ==
- Claribel Alegría (1924–2018)
- Arturo Ambrogi (1874–1936)
- Manlio Argueta (born 1935)
- Mario Bencastro (born 1949)
- Horacio Castellanos Moya (born 1957)
- Carlos Castro (born 1944)
- José Roberto Cea
- Roque Dalton (1935–1975)
- Jacinta Escudos
- Alfredo Espino (1900–1928)
- Francisco Gavidia (1863–1955)
- Pedro Geoffroy Rivas (1908–1979)
- Claudia Hernández González
- David J. Guzmán
- Claudia Lars (1899–1974)
- Francisco Machón Vilanova
- Alberto Masferrer
- Salarrué (1899–1975)

== Guatemala ==
- Arturo Arias
- Miguel Ángel Asturias (1899–1974)
- Flavio Herrera (1895–1968)
- Mario Monteforte Toledo (1911–2003)
- Augusto Monterroso (1921–2003)
- Máximo Soto Hall (1871–1944)

== Honduras ==
- Ramón Amaya Amador (1916–1966)
- Roberto Sosa (1930–2011)
- Eduardo Bähr (born 1940)

== Mexico ==
- Mariano Azuela (1873–1952)
- Rosario Castellanos (1925–1974)
- Salvador Díaz Mirón (1853–1928)
- Juana Inés de la Cruz (1648/1651–1695)
- Ricardo Elizondo Elizondo (1950–2013)
- Laura Esquivel (born 1950)
- Carlos Fuentes (1928–2012)
- Elena Garro (1894–1971)
- Eve Gil (born 1968)
- Manuel Gutiérrez Nájera (1859–1895)
- Jorge Ibargüengoitia (1928–1983)
- Rossy Evelin Lima (born 1986)
- Germán List Arzubide (1898–1998)
- Ramón López Velarde (1888–1921)
- Manuel Maples Arce (1898–1981)
- Ángeles Mastretta (born 1949)
- Amado Nervo (1870–1919)
- Rosa Nissán (born 1939)
- Salvador Novo (1904–1974)
- Fernando del Paso (1935–2018)
- Octavio Paz (1914–1998)
- Carlos Pellicer (1897–1977)
- Sergio Pitol (1933–2018)
- Elena Poniatowska (born 1932)
- Ricardo Raphael (born 1968)
- Alfonso Reyes (1889–1959)
- Juan Rulfo (1917–1986)
- Alberto Ruy-Sánchez (born 1951)
- Jaime Sabines (1926–1999)
- Carlos Tello Díaz (born 1962)
- Arqueles Vela (1899–1977)
- Xavier Villaurrutia (1903–1950)
- Gabriel Zaid (born 1934)

== Nicaragua ==
- Gioconda Belli (born 1948)
- Omar Cabezas (born 1950)
- Ernesto Cardenal (1925–2020)
- Alfonso Cortés (1893–1969)
- Pablo Antonio Cuadra (1912–2002)
- Rubén Darío (1867–1916)
- Salomón de la Selva (1893–1959)
- José Coronel Urtecho (1906–1994)
- Sergio Ramírez (born 1942)

== Panama ==
- Rosa María Britton (1936–2019)
- Gloria Guardia (1940–2019)
- Darío Herrera (1870–1914)
- Ricardo Miró (1883–1940)
- María Olimpia de Obaldía (1891–1985)
- Elsie Alvarado de Ricord (1928–2005)
- José Luis Rodríguez Pittí (born 1971)

== Paraguay ==
- Alcibiades González Delvalle (born 1936)
- Augusto Roa Bastos (1917–2005)

== Peru ==
- Ciro Alegría
- José María Arguedas (1911–1969)
- César Atahualpa Rodríguez (1889–1972)
- Alfredo Bryce Echenique (born 1939)
- Fernando Fernán Gómez (1921–2007)
- María Emma Mannarelli (born 1954)
- Clorinda Matto de Turner (1853–1909)
- Scarlett O'Phelan Godoy (born 1951)
- Isabel Sabogal (born 1958)
- César Vallejo (1892–1938)
- Mario Vargas Llosa (1936–2025)
- Inca Garcilaso de la Vega (1539–1616)
  - See the complete list at List of Peruvian writers.

== Philippines ==
- Jesús Balmori (1887–1948)
- Edmundo Farolán
- Adelina Gurrea Monasterio (1896–1971)
- Graciano López Jaena (1856–1896)
- Apolinario Mabini (1864–1903)
- José Palma (1876–1903)
- Marcelo H. del Pilar (1850–1896)
- Guillermo Gómez Rivera (born 1936)
- Claro M. Recto (1890–1960)
- José Rizal (1861–1896)
- Antonio Abad (1894–1970)

== Puerto Rico ==
- Julia de Burgos, poet
- Giannina Braschi, author of "El imperio de los suenos," and "Yo-Yo Boing!"
- Rosario Ferré, author of "Sweet Diamond Dust"
- René Marqués, author of "La Carretera"
- Luis Rafael Sánchez, author of "Macho Camacho's Beat"

== Spain ==
- Maria Dolores Acevedo (1932–1998)
- Joan Baptista Aguilar (died 1714)
- Rafael Alberti (1902–1999)
- Pedro Antonio de Alarcón (1833–1891)
- Clarín (1852–1901)
- Ignacio Aldecoa (1925–1969)
- Josefina Aldecoa (1926–2011)
- Vicente Aleixandre (1898–1984)
- Mateo Alemán (1547–1614)
- Dámaso Alonso (1898–1990)
- Núria Añó (born 1973)
- Joaquín Arderíus (1885–1969)
- Teresa of Ávila (1515–1582)
- Arturo Barea (1897–1957)
- Pío Baroja (1872–1956)
- Carlos Be (born 1974)
- Gustavo Adolfo Bécquer (1836–1870)
- Gonzalo de Berceo (c. 1190 – c. 1264)
- Carmen Blanco y Trigueros (ca. 1840 - 1921)
- José María Blanco-White (1775–1841)
- Vicente Blasco Ibáñez (1867–1928)
- Juan Boscán (1490–1542)
- José Cadalso (1741–1782)
- Pedro Calderón de la Barca (1600–1681)
- Gabriela Bustelo (born 1962)
- Teresa Cameselle (born 1968)
- Francisco Fernández Carvajal (born 1938)
- Rosalía de Castro (1837–1885)
- Camilo José Cela (1916–2002)
- Luis Cernuda (1902–1963)
- Miguel de Cervantes (1547–1616)
- Gutierre de Cetina (1520–1557)
- Edith Checa Oviedo (1957–2017)
- Matilde Cherner (1833–1880)
- San Juan de la Cruz (1542–1591)
- Álvaro Cunqueiro (1911–1981)
- Miguel Delibes (1920–2010)
- Agustín Díaz Pacheco (born 1953)
- Gerardo Diego (1896–1987)
- Juan del Encina (1469–1533)
- Vicente Espinel (1550–1624)
- José de Espronceda (1808–1842)
- Fray Benito Jerónimo Feijoo (1676–1764)
- León Felipe (1884–1968)
- Trini de Figueroa (1918–1972)
- Espido Freire (born 1974)
- Gloria Fuertes (1917–1998)
- Federico García Lorca (1898–1936)
- Juan García Rodenas (born 1976)
- Concepción Gimeno de Flaquer (1850–1919)
- José María Gironella (1917–2003)
- Luis de Góngora (1561–1627)
- José Goytisolo (1928–1999)
- Juan Goytisolo (1931–2017)
- Luis Goytisolo (born 1935)
- Baltasar Gracián (1601–1658)
- Fray Antonio de Guevara (1480–1545)
- Jorge Guillén (1893–1984)
- Carmela Gutiérrez de Gambra (1921–1984)
- Miguel Hernández (1910–1942)
- José Hierro (1922–2002)
- Francisco Javier Illán Vivas (born 1958)
- Tomás de Iriarte (1750–1791)
- Juan Ramón Jiménez (1881–1958)
- Gaspar de Bracamonte (c. 1595 – 1676)
- Gaspar Melchor de Jovellanos (1744–1811)
- Mariano José de Larra (1809–1837)
- Fray Luis de León (1527 – c. 1591)
- Fernando S. Llobera (born 1965)
- Íñigo López de Mendoza, marqués de Santillana (1398–1458)
- Mariló López Garrido (born 1963)
- Antonio Machado (1875–1936)
- Manuel Machado (1874–1947)
- Jorge Manrique (1440–1479)
- Javier Marías (1951–2022)
- Julián Marías (1914–2005)
- Juan Marsé (1933–2020)
- Carmen Martín Gaite (1925–2000)
- Luis Martín-Santos (1924–1964)
- Azorín (1863–1967)
- Ana María Matute (1925–2014)
- Marina Mayoral (1942)
- Eduardo Mendoza Garriga (born 1943)
- Marcelino Menéndez Pelayo (1856–1912)
- Gabriel Miró (1879–1930)
- Agustín Moreto y Cavana (1618–1661)
- Antonio Muñoz Molina (born 1956)
- Marysa Navarro (1934–2025)
- Emilia Pardo Bazán (1851–1921)
- Benito Pérez Galdós (1843–1920)
- Arturo Pérez-Reverte (born 1951)
- Francisco de Quevedo (1580–1680)
- Vicente Risco (1884–1963)
- Fernando de Rojas (1465–1541)
- Francisco de Rojas Zorrilla (1607–1660)
- Luis Rosales (1910–1992)
- Juan Ruiz, Archpriest of Hita (c. 1283 – c. 1350)
- Juan Ruiz de Alarcón (1581–1639)
- Carlos Ruiz Zafón (1964–2020)
- Pedro Salinas (1892–1951)
- José Luis Sampedro (1917–2013)
- Francisca Sarasate (1853-1922)
- Marta Segarra (born 1963)
- María del Pilar Sinués de Marco (1835–1893)
- Tirso de Molina (1571–1648)
- Gonzalo Torrente Ballester (1910–1999)
- Sara Torres (born 1991)
- Miguel de Unamuno (1864–1936)
- Juan Valera (1824–1905)
- Ramón del Valle-Inclán (1866–1936)
- Félix Lope de Vega (1562–1635)
- Garcilaso de la Vega (1503–1536)
- Marika Vila (born 1949)
- Esteban Manuel de Villegas (1589–1669)
- María de Zayas y Sotomayor (1590–1661)
- José Zorrilla y Moral (1817–1893)
- Alfonso Vallejo (1943–2021)
- Carlos G. Vallés (1925–2020)
- Agustín García Calvo (1926–2012)
- Lydia Zimmermann

== United States ==
- Fray Angelico Chavez (1910–1996)
- Sandra Cisneros (born 1954)
- Giannina Braschi (born 1953)
- Julia de Burgos (1914–1953)

== Uruguay ==
- Eduardo Acevedo Díaz
- José Enrique Rodó
- Eduardo Galeano (1940–2015)
- Bartolomé Hidalgo
- Jorge Majfud (born 1969)
- Mario Benedetti (1920–2009)
- Orosmán Moratorio
- Juan Carlos Onetti (1909–1994)
- Horacio Quiroga (1878–1937)
- Carlos Vaz Ferreira
- Idea Vilariño (1920–2009)

== Venezuela ==
- Rómulo Gallegos (1884–1969)
- Arturo Uslar Pietri (1906–2001)

== See also ==
- List of Spanish-language poets
