= Premio Eugenio Espejo =

Ecuadorian national prize

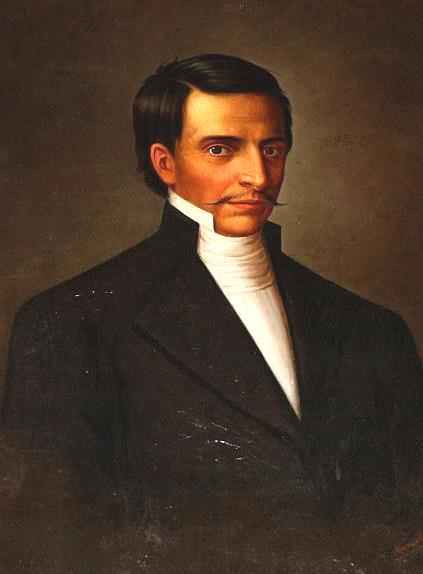

The Premio Nacional Eugenio Espejo ("Eugenio Espejo National Award") is the national prize of the nation of Ecuador. Decrees 677 and 699 (of August 1975 and September 1997, respectively) established the prize, which is conferred by the President of Ecuador. The Award is bestowed every other year. Finalists for receiving the award are put on a short list by the National Council of Culture, and grouped into five categories:

- Cultural Promotion
- Arts
- Literature
- Science
- Public or Private Institutions.

The recipients are then selected from that list by the head of state, who awards them a sum of money, a diploma, a medal and lifetime stipend.

== Recipients ==
From 1975 to 2018 there have been 98 recipients of the prize. Not all categories have been awarded every year resulting in a different number of recipients for each category. 26 for cultural promotion, 19 for arts, 24 for literature, 23 for science, 9 for public or private institutions.

Year	Recipient	Rationale	Ref
1975	Benjamín Carrión	Culture	
1977	Jorge Carrera Andrade	Culture	
1979	Alfredo Pareja Diezcanseco	Literature	
1983	Raúl Andrade Moscoso	Culture	
1984	Fray José María Vargas O.P.	Culture	
1986	Leslie Wright Durán Ballén	Culture	
1986	Alejandro Carrión Aguirre	Literature	
1986	Eduardo Kingman Riofrío	Art	
1986	Plutarco Naranjo Vargas	Science	
1987	Antonio Parra Velasco	Culture	
1987	José Rumazo González	Literature	
1987	Galo Galecio	Art	
1987	Miguel Salvador	Science	
1988	Edmundo Ribadeneira Meneses	Culture	
1988	Gabriel Cevallos García	Literature	
1988	Enrique Tábara	Art	
1988	Augusto Bonilla Barco	Science	
1989	Jorge Pérez Concha	Culture	
1989	Jorge Enrique Adoum	Literature	
1989	Araceli Gilbert de Blomberg	Art	
1989	Miguel Acosta Solís	Science	
1991	Hernán Crespo Toral	Culture	
1991	Pedro Jorge Vera	Literature	
1991	Oswaldo Guayasamín	Art	
1991	Agustín Cueva	Science	
1993	Gerardo Guevara Viteri	Culture	
1993	Nelson Estupiñán Bass	Literature	
1993	Alfredo Palacio Moreno	Art	
1993	José Varea Terán	Science	
1995	Jorge Salvador Lara	Culture	
1995	Adalberto Ortiz	Literature	
1995	Luis A. Romo Saltos	Science	
1997	Nicolás Kingman Riofrío	Culture	
1997	Ángel Felicísimo Rojas	Literature	
1997	Oswaldo Viteri Paredes	Art	
1997	Alfonso Rumazo González	Science	
1999	Yela Loffredo de Klein	Culture	
1999	Efraín Jara Idrovo	Literature	
1999	Oswaldo Muñoz Mariño	Art	
1999	Juan Larrea Holguín	Science	
2001	Filoteo Samaniego Salazar	Culture	
2001	José Martínez Queirolo	Literature	
2001	Jorge Swett	Art	
2001	Rodrigo Fierro Benítez	Science	
2001	Parque Histórico de Guayaquil	Public or Private Institution	
2003	Tránsito Amaguaña	Culture	
2003	Galo René Pérez	Literature	
2003	Leonardo Tejada	Art	
2003	Jorge Marcos Pino	Science	
2003	Casa de la Cultura Ecuatoriana	Public or Private Institution	
2005	Luis Enrique Fierro	Culture	
2005	Rodolfo Pérez Pimentel	Literature	
2005	Theo Constanté	Art	
2005	Rodrigo Cabezas Naranjo	Science	
2005	Academia Ecuatoriana de la Lengua	Public or Private Institution	
2006	Edgar Palacios	Culture	
2006	Miguel Donoso Pareja	Literature	
2006	Diego Luzuriaga	Art	
2006	Ramón Lazo	Science	
2006	Orquesta Sinfónica Nacional	Public or Private Institution	
2007	Jaime Galarza Zavala	Culture	
2007	Carlos Eduardo Jaramillo Castillo	Literature	
2007	Aníbal Villacís	Art	
2007	Frank Weilbauer	Science	
2007	Grupo Folclórico "Tierra Caliente" de Petita Palma	Public or Private Institution	
2008	Rodrigo Pallares	Culture	
2008	Alicia Yánez Cossío	Literature	
2008	Carlos Rubira Infante	Art	
2008	Eduardo Villacís	Science	
2008	Editorial "Abya Yala"	Public or Private Institution	
1995 *	Enrique Gil Calderón. Rejected in 1995 from President Sixto Duran Ballen, but accepted in 2008 from President Rafael Correa	Art	
2009	Horacio Hidrovo Peñaherrera	Culture	
2009	Euler Granda	Literature	
2009	Estuardo Maldonado	Art	
2009	Magner Turner Carrión	Science	
2009	Academia Nacional de Historia	Public or Private Institution	
2010	Jorge Núñez Sánchez	Culture	
2010	Julio Pazos Barrera	Literature	
2010	Esperanza Cruz Hidalgo	Art	
2010	Claudio Cañizares Proaño	Science	
2010	Ballet Folclórico Nacional "Jacchigua"	Public or Private Institution	
2011	Guillermo Ayoví Erazo (Papá Roncón)	Culture	
2011	Rafael Díaz Ycaza	Literature	
2011	Luigi Stornaiolo Pimentel	Art	
2011	José Amén-Palma	Science	
2011	Fundación Ecuatoriana de Olimpiadas Especiales	Public or Private Institution	
2012	Abdón Ubidia	Literature	
2012	Luis Silva Parra	Art	
2012	Eugenia María del Pino Veintimilla	Science	
2015	Pilar Bustos	Culture	
2015	Fernando Tinajero	Literature	
2015	Luis Cumbal	Science	
2016	Beatriz Parra	Culture	
2016	Jorge Davila	Literature	
2016	Manuel Cruz Padilla	Science	
2018	Fernando Cazón Vera	Literature	
2018	Enrique Males	Culture	
2018	Marcelo Cruz	Science	
2020	Juan Valdano Morejón	Literature	
2020	Álvaro Manzano Montero	Culture	
2020	Katya Susana Romoleroux	Science	
2022	Patricia González	Culture	
2022	Javier Vásconez	Literature	
2022	Segundo Moreno Yánez	Science	
