= Víctor Manuel Albornoz =

Ecuadorian writer and historian (1896–1975)

Víctor Manuel Albornoz Cabanilla (Lima, March 23, 1896 – Cuenca, October 26, 1975) was an Ecuadorian writer, poet, biographer, and historian.

== Biography ==
Albornoz was born in Lima, Peru on March 23, 1896. His father was from Ambato, Ecuador, and his mother was from Lima, Peru. At a young age he moved permanently to Cuenca, Ecuador, where he completed all of his primary and secondary education.

He helped initiate journalism in Cuenca and founded the newspaper La Crónica.

On August 16, 1966, he was recognized as an Ecuadorian citizen according to Act No. 122 from the Ministry of Foreign Affairs, because his father was Ecuadorian.

In 1947 he was one of the founding members of the House of Ecuadorian Culture. He was also a member of the Ecuadorian Academy of Language.

He died on October 26, 1975, of a brain hemorrhage.

== Personal life ==
He was married to Leticia Peralta Rosales, with whom he had 4 children.

== Works ==
Poetry

- “Ojos en Extasis”
- “Jardín sin Sol”
- “La Llaga de Job”

Biography

- “Fray Vicente Solano” (1942)
- “Rafael María Arízaga” (1949)
- “Antonio Vega Muñoz” (1957)
- “Semblanza de Octavio Cordero Palacios” (1958)
- “Alberto Muñoz Vernaza” (1969)

History

- “Monografía Histórica del Cantón Girón” (1935)
- “Fundación de la Ciudad de Cuenca de América” (1941)
- “La Independencia de Cuenca” (1943)
- “La Antigua Tomebamba y Cuenca que Nace” (1946)
- “Cuenca a Través de Cuatro Siglos” (1959–60)
- “Acotaciones a las Relaciones Geográficas de Indias Concernientes a la Gobernación de Cuenca” (1951).
