= Patricia González =

Patricia González may refer to:

- Patricia González (artist), Colombian-born American artist
- Patricia González (singer), Ecuadorian singer

== See also ==
- Patrisia Gonzales, traditional healer/midwife and professor of indigenous studies
