= José Amén-Palma =

Ecuadorian surgeon and medical researcher (born 1926)

- Born: 23 October 1926; Portoviejo, Ecuador
- Education: University of Guayaquil
- Occupations: Surgeon, medical researcher
- Years active: 1957–2009
- Medical career
- Profession: Surgeon
- Field: Urology
- Institutions: Portoviejo Medical Hospital
- Awards: Premio Eugenio Espejo (2011)

José Amén-Palma (born 23 October 1926) is an Ecuadorian surgeon and medical researcher.

His passion for medicine led him to undertake countless researches, of which two stand out: a technique to prevent bleeding during urological interventions and another to do digestive surgeries with the autograft-method also known as "fascia lata" - to reinforce the inguinal hernia.

Amén-Palma was awarded the Ecuadorian National Prize "Premio Eugenio Espejo" in 2011 for his lifetime work in the field of Science.

== Biography ==
Amén-Palma was born in Portoviejo on 23 October 1926. He graduated with a medical degree from the University of Guayaquil with a thesis on urethral stricture, specifically those of traumatic origin. He specialized in Barcelona at the Puigvert Urology and Nephrology Institute, and in Mexico with Professor Ruben Gittes of Harvard University. He has attended numerous international urology-related conferences.

Amén-Palma was a practising doctor in the Portoviejo Medical Hospital between 1957 and 2009, where he developed new surgical techniques, including one that helped control haemorrhaging during prostate surgery.

Amén-Palma was a member of various medical institutions and member of the Academy of Medicine of Catalonia, member of the Ecuadorian Academy of Medicine, a founding member of the National Society of Ophthalmology, Member of the Society of Gastroenterology; member of the Ecuadorian Society of Urology and Meritorious Society of Medical Surgery of Guayas.

Amén-Palma was also editor of the Medical Journal of Manabi (1969) and author of numerous scientific articles. He authored "Innovations in surgical technique : contribution to hemostasis in prostatic surgery and hernia repair with fascia lata autograft.

== Awards ==
- The University of Guayaquil Prize (1954)
- Labour Merit Award from the Ministry of Labour (1981)
- Award from the Municipality of Portoviejo for their scientific research (1993)
- "Jose Joaquin Olmedo" Award from the House of Ecuadorian Culture (2002)
- "Eloy Alfaro" Award in the rank of Grand Cross, by the government of the province of Manabi (2003)
