= Galo Galecio =

Ecuadorian painter, sculptor, caricaturist and printmaker

Galo Galecio Taranto (June 1, 1906 in Vinces – April 14, 1993 in Quito) was a prominent Ecuadorian painter, muralist, sculptor, caricaturist, and printmaker, whose work is known for its political content and recurring theme of Afro-Latin American life and culture.

He studied at the Guayaquil School of Fine Arts and as a young artist became politicized against Ecuador's conservative governments and the arts establishment, joining the Alere Flamman anti-fascist group in 1935 and the Group of Independent Artists and Writers in 1938. As a member of the opposition Alianza Democrática Ecuatoriana, he participated in the movement that deposed the government of Carlos Arroyo del Río in May 1944.

Following the change in government, he received a two-year scholarship from Ecuador's Ministry of Education to study mural painting and printmaking at Mexico's National Academy of Fine Arts. In Mexico, he studied with famous muralist Diego Rivera, and became a member of the highly politicized printmaking workshop Taller de Gráfica Popular (TGP).

While working at the TGP, Galecio created a series of 28 woodcut engravings to illustrate the book of poetry Tierra, Son y Tambor: Cantares Negros y Mulatos, by the Afro-Ecuadorian writer Adalberto Ortiz, published in Mexico in 1945 by Ediciones La Cigarra.

He then created his first print portfolio Bajo la linea del Ecuador (Below the Line of the Equator), a series of 31 woodcut engravings he produced while at the TGP, published in 1946 by La Estampa Mexicana with a prologue by TGP founder Leopoldo Méndez.

In 1956, Galecio won the Badalona Prize at the Spain's III Hispano-American Art Biennial, with a woodcut engraving titled El entierro de la niña negra (The Burial of the Black Girl). In 1968, the Museum of Modern Art in New York acquired three woodcuts for its permanent collection. He participated in numerous national and international exhibitions, including the biennials of Sao Paulo, Tokyo, Havana, Santiago de Chile, Washington and Catalonia.

In Ecuador, he was a professor of engraving and drawing at the College of Plastic Arts of the Central University, and at the School of Fine Arts in Quito. He also created mural paintings in Ecuador, among them Gente de pueblo (1946), Historia del Ecuador (1960), Primer vuelo sobre los Andes (1960) and Protección y fomento de la economía del país (1965).

In 1987 Galo Galecio was awarded Ecuador's prestigious prize "Premio Eugenio Espejo" for his lifetime work as an artist.
