= Leonardo Tejada =

Ecuadorian painter

Leonardo Tejada (Latacunga, 1908 - Quito, 2005) was an Ecuadorian painter whose work was known for its Social Realism and Expressionism.

Tejada was born into a family of wood carvers, ad himself used wood in his art. He was a folklore scholar and an initiator of the folk art revival of Ecuador. In 1923 he enrolled in the School of Fine Arts in Quito, from which he graduated in 1930.

He was one of the founders of the House of Ecuadorian Culture.

From a young age he created art that expressed the social reality of his people. He employed watercolor, oil, and wood carving in his art. He is credited largely in the revival of folk art in Ecuador. He held his first exhibition of folk art in the House of Ecuadorian Culture in 1952. He also contributed to the revival of Ecuador's indigenous sculptural art. Since the 1970s he incorporated recyclable materials in his works, including rags, cords, and other materials, seeking more expression from the materials themselves. He also worked as a teacher in various countries, such as Costa Rica and Venezuela.

Even in school Tejada, like most artists, showed a tendency to think outside the box. Not interested in academics, he spent his time painting. His uniqueness lay in his rooting his paintings in the prevalent social situation. It was this closeness and desire to depict social life that gave Tejada's work a sociopolitical dignity. His approach also made him immensely popular in his country. His oil paintings are specially candid and painfully honest, depicting misery and poverty of the people. His contribution to wood engraving in Ecuador is equally important. He is credited with starting a renaissance of sorts in wood engraving. His exhibition of Folk Art, set in 1952 at the House of Ecuadorian Culture is also seen as an important step in reviving folk art in Ecuador.

He died in Quito on January 30, 2005 at 97 years of age.

In 2003 he was awarded Ecuador's national prize Premio Eugenio Espejo in the field of art.
