= Katya Susana Romoleroux =

Ecuadorian botanist

Katya Susana Romoleroux is an Ecuadorian botanist. In 2020, she was awarded the 29th Eugenio Espejo National Prize for her lifelong contribution to science in Ecuador.

She was born in Quito in 1961. She did a fellowship in Tropical Biology at the University of Aarhus, and completed her PhD with funding from the Danish government. In 2002 she obtained a postdoctoral fellowship from the Alexander von Humboldt Foundation to conduct research at LMU Munich. She has taught at the Pontifical Catholic University of Ecuador for more than 20 years, where she is also curator and director of the QCA Herbarium.

Romoleroux has discovered a number of indigenous plants previously unknown to science. Her research focuses on high Andean flora, especially in the Rosaceae family. She was the first Ecuadorian researcher to publish the complete taxonomic treatment of the Rosaceae plant family. She has published widely in her field, including scholarly articles, books and book chapters.

She is a founding member of the Ecuadorian Academy of Sciences, the Latin American Academy of Sciences, and the Latin American Botanical Association.

The standard author abbreviation Romol. is used to indicate this person as the author when citing a botanical name.
