= Esperanza Cruz Hidalgo =

Former Ecuadorian dance instructor

- Born: February 25, 1930 (age 95); Guayaquil, Ecuador
- Occupation(s): Ballerina, Dance Instructor
- Known for: Performer of classical ballet
- Awards: Premio Eugenio Espejo (2010)

Esperanza Cruz Hidalgo (born February 25, 1930, in Guayaquil) is a former Ecuadorian ballerina and dance instructor.

== Biography ==
Esperanza Cruz Hidalgo's parents, Saturnino Carranza and Maria Cruz Hidalgo Baluarte died when she was still young. Her brother, Alfonso Cruz, then raised her. She began her studies in the private school “Mercantil.” Later, she went on to the school "Normal Rita Lecumberri" where "by chance" she started her activity in ballet with Professor Roberto Lozada (Argentina), and then after applying for three consecutive years, she was accepted to the Dance Academy of the House of Ecuadorian Culture (Guayaquil branch). At this time, she earned the Medal of Merit for Academic Excellence from the Philanthropic Society of Guayas, and graduated in 1949 with excellent grades and high honors.

When she entered college, her brother asked her to become a doctor, and although she studied medicine for three years, her artistic inclinations led her to switch to the School of Languages, Faculty of Arts at the University of Guayaquil where she studied English, French, Italian and German for five years. She left school in 1956 without graduating due to her many important artistic commitments that would lead her to travel regularly to the US, Europe, Buenos Aires, Mexico, Venezuela, and Panama, among other places.

While she was in college, she had the opportunity to study with renowned artists from Argentina, Ecuador, the United States, and Mexico, including: Aida Mastrazzi, María Ruanova, Robert Joffrey, Joseph Balanchine, Igor Youskevitch, Grace Moore, Kitty Sakilarides, Ileana Leonidoff, and Nelsy Dambré.

In 1966, she traveled to the US at the invitation of the program Council Leads and Specialist, where she studied writing workshops in dance, stagecraft, and stage makeup. In 1978, she was invited to be the Resident Artist by the organization Partner of the Americas (a university exchange), there she partook in a tour of ballet, folklore, and traditions and customs of Ecuador, making her name and that of her country known; she returned to Ecuador to share her experience and expertise.

Now in Ecuador, she appeared as a solo dancer of the Golden Age of ballet, she joined the Guayaquil Ballet Group of the Ecuadorian House of Culture (Guayaquil branch), gave classes at colleges, cultural centers, offered classes, gave recitals, brought dance to television, she filmed Sílfides y Bodas by Aurora. After she accomplished many achievements in the realm of ballet, she decided to become a dedicated ballet instructor.

In 1972, she was appointed as an artistic director of the Ballet School of the Ecuadorian House of Culture. By 1979, she was an instructor at her own ballet school, at various private educational institutions, and at the Ballet School of the Ecuadorian House of Culture (Guayaquil branch) where she continues to teach today.

In December 2010, she received the Ecuadorian National Prize in Art "Premio Eugenio Espejo" awarded by President Rafael Correa, thanks in part to a request by the Institute of International Education (USA) and the support of more than 2,000 signatures on Facebook by friends, former students, and fans.
