= Jorge Swett =

Ecuadorian muralist, painter, lawyer and writer

- Born: Jorge Swett Palomeque; February 6, 1926; Guayaquil, Ecuador
- Died: February 24, 2012 (aged 86); Guayaquil, Ecuador
- Occupation(s): Muralist, Painter, Writer
- Awards: Premio Eugenio Espejo (2001)

Jorge Swett Palomeque (February 6, 1926 – February 24, 2012) was an Ecuadorian muralist, painter, lawyer and writer.

He was born and died in Guayaquil, Ecuador.

He created more than 100 murals during his lifetime, many of which can be seen in buildings throughout his hometown, such as the Municipal Museum of Guayaquil, the Social Security Fund Building, the old Simon Bolivar Airport, the Children's Hospital, the Catholic University of Santiago of Guayaquil, Ecuavisa, among others.

He published a book of short stories titled "Ciertas partes de mi vida" (Certain Parts of My Life) in 2001, and a book of short stories and poems "La montaña y los recuerdos" (The Mountain and the Memories) in 2010.

He was the president of the House of Ecuadorian Culture (Guayas branch) and professor at the Catholic University of Santiago of Guayaquil. He won the Gold Medal of the City of Guayaquil, and the National Prize of Culture "Premio Eugenio Espejo" in 2001.
