= Rodrigo Pallares =

Ecuadorian architect

Rodrigo Pallares (1925 – February 7, 2009) was an Ecuadorian architect and promoter of Ecuadorian culture. He was Director of the Cultural Heritage Institute attached to Ecuador's Ministry of Education.

== Biography ==
Pallares was born in 1925 in Quito. He graduated from the Central University of Ecuador and specialized at the Sorbonne in París. Pallares worked in the preservation, protection and dissemination of the cultural heritage of Ecuador and, especially, Quito. In 1979 he founded the National Institute of Cultural Heritage (INPC). In 1983, after seven years of proceedings before the court of Turin, Pallares, in his capacity as Director of the INPC, obtained the return of 12,000 archaeological pieces taken illicitly from Ecuador, the largest recovery of heritage objects of Ecuadorian history.

In 1975 he proposed Quito to UNESCO for consideration as a World Heritage Site. In 1978 Quito and Kraków became the first UNESCO World Heritage Sites.

In 2008 Rodrigo Pallares was awarded the "Premio Eugenio Espejo" by the Ecuadorian President for his work in Ecuadorian culture.
