= Eduardo Villacís Meythaler =

Ecuadorian cardiologist and poet

Eduardo Villacís Meythaler was an Ecuadorian cardiologist and poet. In 2008, he was awarded the Eugenio Espejo Prize for his outstanding scientific activity. From 1967 to 2011, he worked at the Carlos Andrade Marín Hospital in Quito, first as head of the hemodynamics laboratory and later as head of cardiology. He was a member of the Ecuadorian Academy of Medicine, and published more than 30 scientific papers.

As a poet, he published three collections, typically at a gap of decades. His selected poems were collected in the volume Ajuar de cal.

== Poetry ==
- Latitud Unánime, 1953 (with Alfonso Barrera Valverde)
- Dieta sin sol, 1981
- Documental sobre un conspirador, 1994
- Ajuar de cal, 20068
