= Julio Pazos Barrera =

Ecuadorian poet, editorer, teacher, and cook (born 1944)

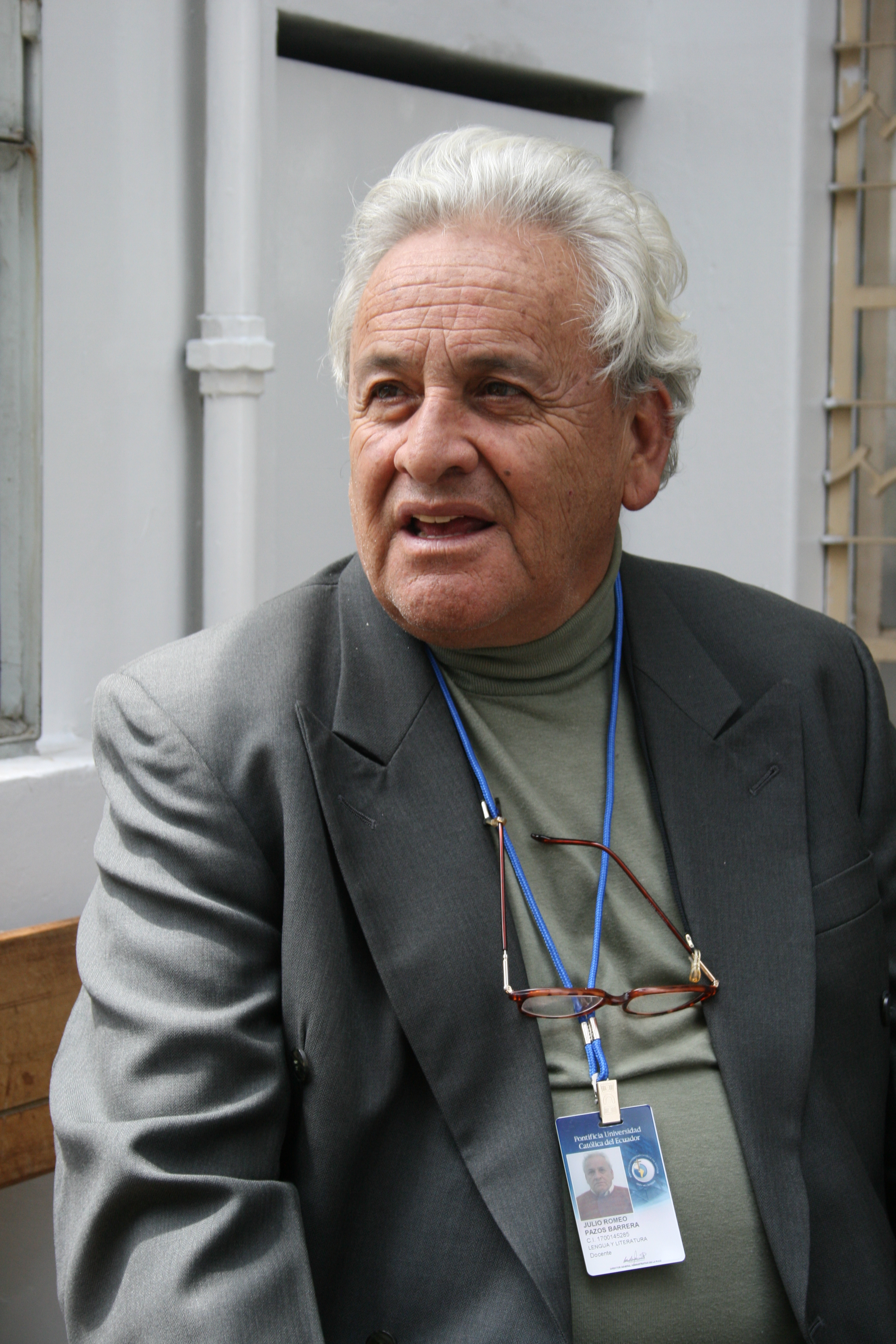
- 2008
- Born: 18 August 1944 (age 82); Baños, Ecuador
- Occupations: Poet, editor
- Writing career
- Notable work: La ciudad y las visiones (1980)
- Notable awards: Premio Eugenio Espejo (2010)

Julio Pazos Barrera (Baños, 18 August 1944) is a poet, editor, teacher, and cook.

== Career ==
He is the editor-in-chief of the magazine Letras del Ecuador (Letters from Ecuador) published by the Ecuadorian House of Culture, and editor-in-chief of the magazine América.

He is a member of the Ecuadorian Academy of Language.

He was awarded the "Premio Eugenio Espejo", Ecuador's National Prize in Literature, in 2010 by the President of Ecuador.

== Awards ==
- First Prize and Medal. Poetry Contest, Catholic University of Ecuador (1968)
- First Prize. Conrado Blanco Foundation of Madrid, Homage to Quito (1973
- National Literature Prize "Aurelio Espinosa Pólit" (1979)
- "Casa de las Américas" Prize, Havana, Cuba (1982)
- “Juan León Mera” Distinction Award from the city of Ambato (1988)
- "Jorge Carrera Andrade" Prize from the city of Quito (1988)
- “Juan Montalvo” Distinction Award from the city of Ambato (1994)
- Gold Medal “Aurelio Espinosa Pólit” for letters and culture, city of Quito (2006)
- Premio Eugenio Espejo (2010)

== Works ==
- Plegaria azul (1963)
- Ocupaciones del buscador (Quito, 1971)
- Prendas tan queridas las palabras entregadas al vuelo (1974)
- Entre las sombras y las iluminaciones (1977)
- Entre las sombras las iluminaciones (1977)
- La ciudad y las visiones (1980)
- Levantamiento del país con textos libres (1982)
- Ensayo: "Medardo Angel Silva" Estudio introductorio (1983)
- Oficios (1984)
- Contienda entre la vida y la muerte o Personajes volando en un lienzo (1985)
- "La voragine". Estudio introductorio (1985)
- Mujeres (1988)
- "La victoria de Junín y otros poemas". Estudio introductorio (1988)
- Cocina criolla, cocinemos lo nuestro (1990)
- Literatura popular: versos y dichos de Tungurahua (1991)
- Constancias (1993)
- "Oposición a la magia de Francisco Proaño Arandi". Estudio introductorio (1994)
- Juan León Mera: una visión actual (1996)
- Holograma (1997)
- Acercamiento a la obra de Oscar Efrén Reyes (1997)
- Arte de la memoria (1998).
- Días de pesares y delirios (2001)
- El sabor de la memoria (2008)
