= Filoteo Samaniego =

Ecuadorian writer

- Born: Filoteo Samaniego Salazar; July 11, 1928; Quito, Ecuador
- Died: February 21, 2013 (aged 84); Quito, Ecuador
- Occupations: Novelist, Poet, Diplomat, Translator
- Writing career
- Language: Spanish
- Notable awards: Premio Eugenio Espejo (2001)

Filoteo Samaniego Salazar (July 11, 1928 – February 21, 2013) was an Ecuadorian novelist, poet, historian, translator, and diplomat. He became a member of the Ecuadorian Academy of Language in 1984, and was its secretary from 1996 to 2006. He was awarded Ecuador's most prestigious prize, the Premio Eugenio Espejo, in 2001. Samaniego's diplomatic career began in 1949 as the chief of staff of the Ministry of Foreign Affairs of Ecuador. He served as Ecuador's Ambassador to Austria, Germany, Romania and Egypt; and was a permanent representative of Ecuador to the United Nations Industrial Development Organization (ONUDI); and held many other academic, national, and international posts in his lifetime. He translated books from French to Spanish, including the Spanish translation of Chronique (1960) (trans. Crónica, 1961) by the French Nobel laureate Saint-John Perse.

== Works ==
Poetry

- Agraz (Quito, 1956)
- Relente (Quito, 1958)
- Umiña (Quito, 1960)
- Signos II (Quito, 1966)
- El cuerpo desnudo de la tierra (Quito, 1973)
- Los niños sordos (Quito, 1978)
- Oficios del río (Quito, 1984)
- Los testimonios (Quito, 1992)
- La uña de Dios (Quito, 1996)

Novels

- Sobre sismos y otros miedos (Madrid, 1991)

Non-fiction

- Columnario quiteño (1972)
- Ecuador: un mundo verde junto al sol (dos volúmenes, 1979–1980) (English translation: Ecuador: A Fertile Land Blessed by the Sun, 1985, Editions Delroisse)
- Habla y arte americanos (1984)
- Consta en las antologías: Lírica ecuatoriana contemporánea (Bogotá, 1979)
- Poesía viva del Ecuador (Quito, 1990)
- La palabra perdurable (Quito, 1991).
