= Juan Tanca Marengo =

Ecuadorian physician

Juan Tanca Marengo (1895–1965) was an Ecuadorian physician.

He graduated as a doctor in 1920 and specialized in gastroenterology in Paris (1933). In 1940 Colonel Julian founded the clinic. In 1945 he chaired the National Patriotic Council and was received as a member of the brand new House of Ecuadorian Culture . He was a member of the Board of Charities of Guayas (1947) and founder of the Society Against Cancer (SOLCA), also organized the Guayas Transit Commission.
