= Edmundo Ribadeneira Meneses =

Ecuadorian writer and university professor

Edmundo Ribadeneira Meneses (Ibarra, November 2, 1920 – February 14, 2004) was an Ecuadorian writer and university professor.

He was awarded the Ecuadorian National Prize in Culture "Premio Eugenio Espejo" in 1988 by the President of Ecuador.

He was the president of the House of Ecuadorian Culture from 1979-1988. He was a university professor and columnist for El Comercio.

== Works ==
- La moderna novela ecuatoriana (The Modern Ecuadorian Novel) (1958)
- El destierro es redondo (Exile is Round)
- La novela italiana de la segunda posguerra (The Italian Novel of the Second World War) (1959)
