= Plutarco Naranjo Vargas =

Ecuadorian doctor, teacher, journalist, historian, scientific researcher and ambassador

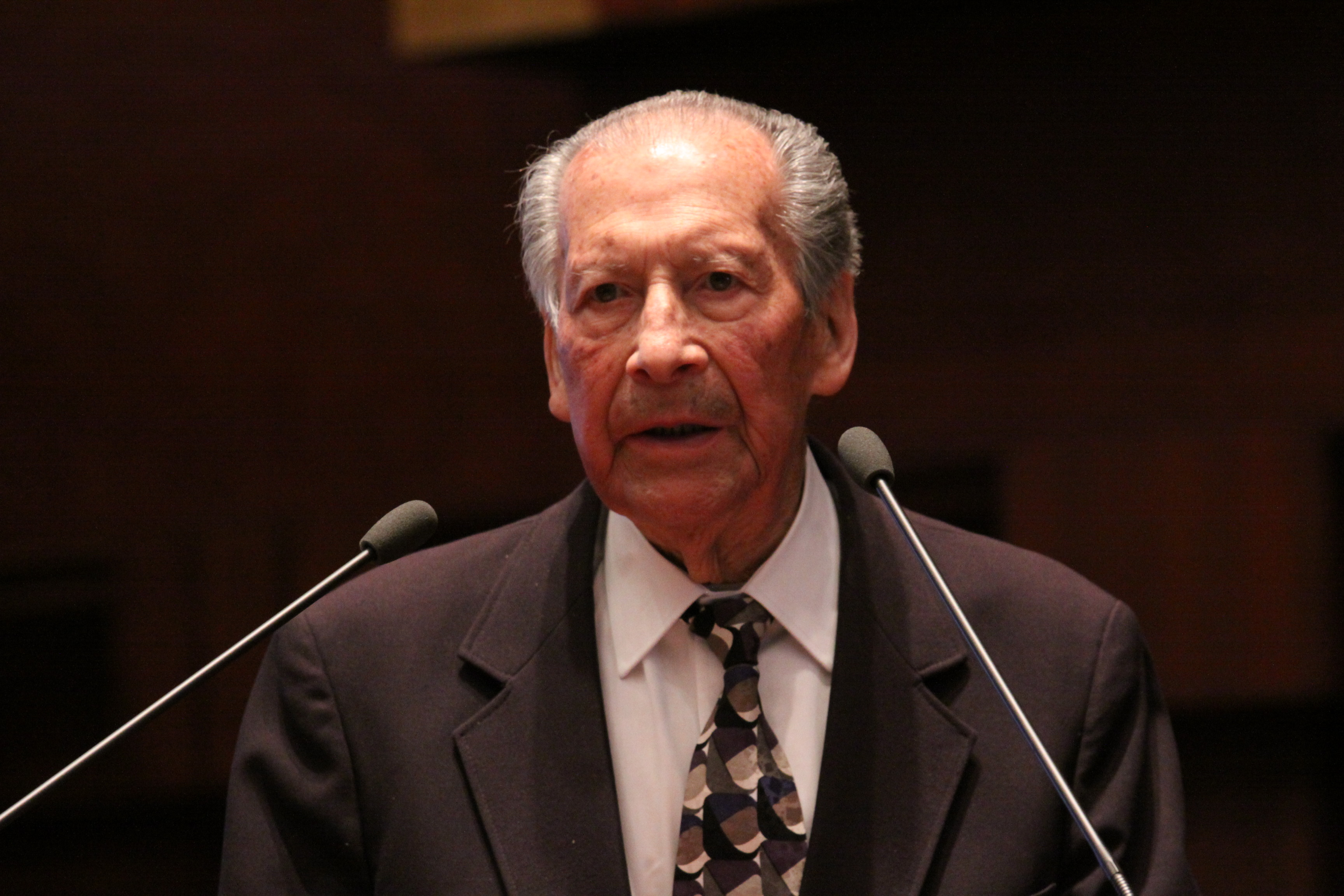

Minister of Health
- In office August 10, 1988 – August 10, 1992
- President: Rodrigo Borja Cevallos

Personal details
- Born: June 18, 1921 Ambato, Tungurahua Province, Ecuador
- Died: April 27, 2012 (aged 90) Quito, Ecuador
- Party: Party of the Democratic Left (Izquierda Democrática)
- Spouse: Enriqueta Banda Flores
- Children: Alexis; Ana; Plutarco
- Education: Central University of Ecuador

Plutarco Naranjo Vargas (Ambato, June 18, 1921 – April 27, 2012) was a doctor, teacher, journalist, historian, and scientific researcher. He served as the Ecuadorian ambassador to the Soviet Union, Poland, and the German Democratic Republic (concurrently) from 1977 to 1978. In 1988, he accepted a four-year appointment to the cabinet of newly elected president Rodrigo Borja Cevallos as Minister of Health.

In the Academy, Naranjo was one of the trainers through generations of doctors in Ecuador, he participated as organizer of Pharmacology Chair and advised to the Physiology Department of Valley University (Cali-Colombia), besides, he founded the Pharmacology Chair at Central University of Ecuador.

Since his youth, he was strong involved in botany, that allowed him to open the possibility of knowledge interchange between the Western knowledge of botany and traditional medicine, the sacred uses of plants and myths and cultures, creating big contributions to Ethnomedicine.

His research was very important in pharmacology, which contributed to improve the life quality, from the field of health to a wide population of patients with various pathologies, in the same way, he made several researches about immunological mechanisms, hypersensitivity to drugs and foods, allergies to antibiotics, and more.

He was a founder of the Ecuadorian Academy of Medicine and became its president. He was also president of the SILAE - Italo Latin American Association of Ethnomedicine from 1995 to 1997. He was also the academic director in the field of health at the Simón Bolívar Andean University.

He was married to Dr. Enriqueta Banda Flores. They had three children: Alexis, Ana and Plutarco.

He received the Eugenio Espejo National Award in 1986 in the field of science.

He died in Quito on April 27, 2012.

== Awards ==
- He was awarded the Central University Prize in four separate occasions for his scientific research.
- He received awards from the governments of Italy (1972), Romania (1976), and Peru (1990)
- The "Isabel Tobar Guarderas" Prize, from the municipality of Quito (1977)
- The Ecuadorian National Prize "Premio Eugenio Espejo" (1986)

== Published works (abridged) ==
- La doctrina socialista (1949)
- Montalvo y sus obras (1966)
- Ayahuasca: Etnomedicina y mitología (1983)
- Itinerario de un pueblo: Notas de un viaje a Israel (1987)
- Saber alimentarse (1991)
- La lucha por la independencia del primer grito a la primera constitución (2009)
