= Luigi Stornaiolo Pimentel =

Ecuadorian painter

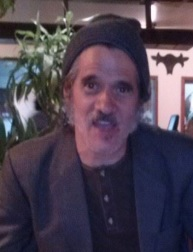
Luigi Pimentel

Luigi Stornaiolo Pimentel (b. Quito, June 9, 1956) is an Ecuadorian painter.

He has exhibited his artwork in Peru, Brazil, Canada, Australia, Mexico, Belgium, Puerto Rico, Miami, New York City, and Venezuela.

In 1980 he had his first art exhibit at the gallery "Club de Arte" where he presented his work titled "Ironic Drawings Within a Lucid Realism and Almost Photographic in their Details".

His father Bruno Stornaiolo Miranda was born in Naples, Italy, was a clinical psychologist, and authored a novel called Réquiem por un Dinosaurio (Requiem for a Dinosaur), and short stories. His mother, Angela Pimentel Franco, was born in Quito.

He is married to Nelly Witt Vorbeck, and they have a daughter named Silvia Anna. Since meeting Nelly in 1974 she has been his muse, and there exists close to 40 oil paintings of her in their home.

He was awarded Ecuador's National Prize in Art "Premio Eugenio Espejo" in 2011.
