= Leslie Wright (pianist) =

Ecuadorian pianist

Leslie Wright Durán Ballén (born April 11, 1938 in Quito) is an Ecuadorian pianist. He is Ecuador's cultural attaché in Paris and has received many international awards.

== Life and career ==
Leslie Wright received his first piano lessons at six years old. In 1953 he joined the Music Academy of Santa Cecilia in Rome. He graduated in 1960, winning first prize and jury mention. In 1961 he participated in the International Piano Competition in Geneva, taking third place. In 1962 he made a tour of several South American countries appearing in theaters and concert halls. In 1963 he won first prize in the "Biernans" competition in Paris. Shortly afterwards he was honored in the global contest of Bilbao from among 44 virtuoso pianists worldwide. In 1965 he won a major prize in the International Piano Competition "Marguerite Long", in Paris.

He was awarded the Ecuadorian national award "Premio Eugenio Espejo" in 1986 from the President of Ecuador for his contribution to the national culture.

Leslie Wright married fellow pianist Nadine Vercambre Paul of France, with whom he plays concerts. "Leslie and Nadine Wright", as they are best known, have done 6 world tours.
