= Patricia González (singer) =

Ecuadorian singer

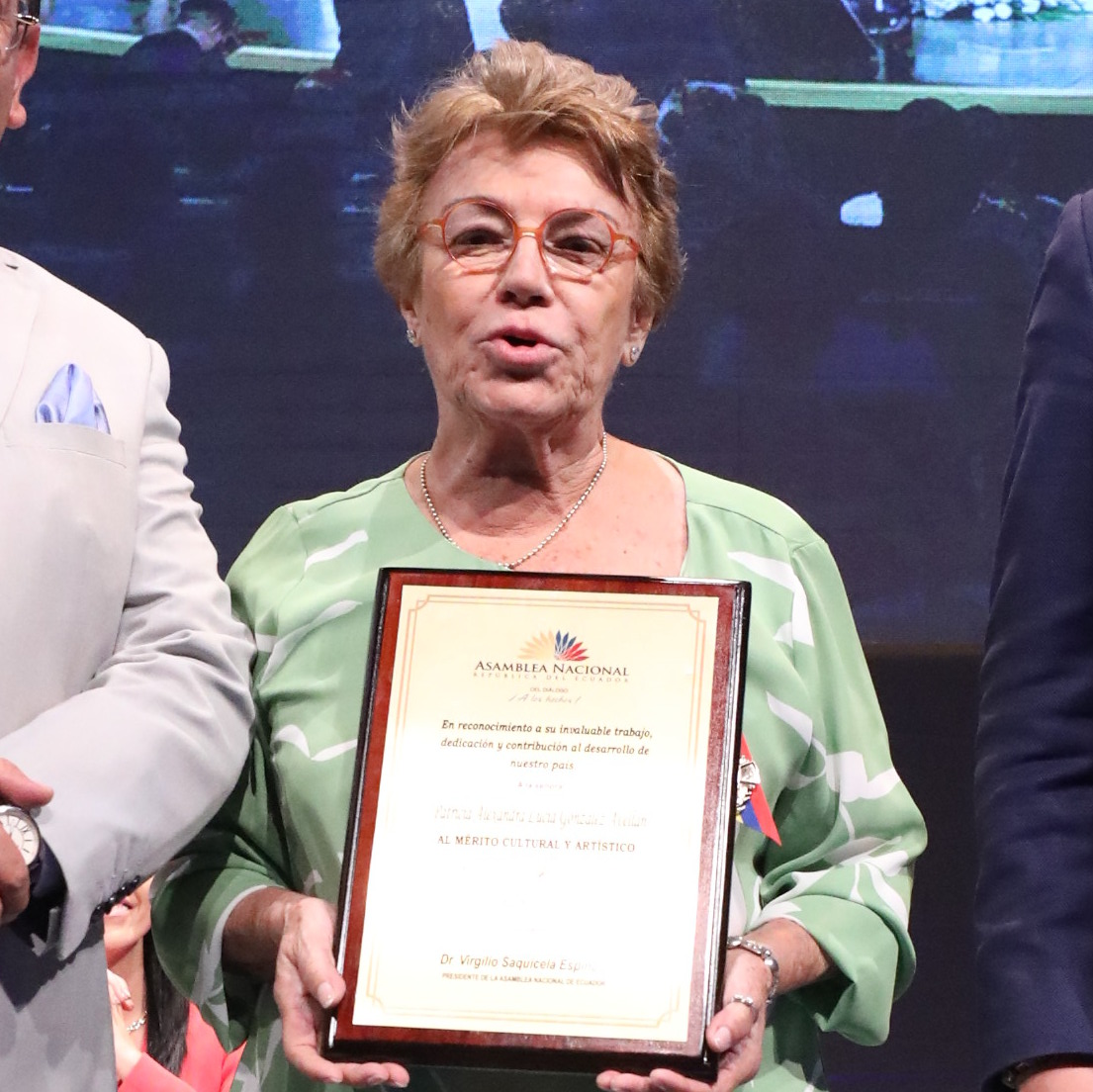
- González in 2022 with an award
- Born: May 15, 1943; Guayaquil, Ecuador
- Other names: La González
- Occupation: Singer
- Known for: Over 50 years of entertaining

Patricia Lucía Alexandra González Avellán (born May 15, 1943) is an Ecuadorian singer from Guayaquil. In 2022 she was given Ecuador's highest award for culture.

== Life ==
González was born in Guayaquil in 1943. She began her professional career in 1970 when she performed at Teatro 9 de Octubre in her home town with Cuban singer Rolando Laserie. Her early recordings were of boleros written by Alberto Cortez, Chico Novarro and Rafael Solano. Over the years she has recorded over 40 albums of music which includes 20 LPs.

At the end of July 2021 the Municipal Public Company of Tourism, Civic Promotion and International Relations of Guayaquil arranged a musical concert to celebrate her fifty years of singing. The evening was broadcast and it included special guests and she sang duets with other noted singers.

In 9 August 2022 she was given the Premio Eugenio Espejo for culture by the President of Ecuador at the Palacio de Carondelet. There were three winners that year but the other two awards were for literature or science. The award is given annually and this was the thirtieth year. Her award recognised her 52 years of entertaining. She was given a medal, $10,000 and a life pension set at five time the average national salary.

In October 2002 she was again recognised with an award by the President of the National Assembly, Virgilio Saquicela, when the assembly unusually met in Guayaquil to celebrate 202 years of Ecuador's independence.
