= Fernando S. Llobera =

Spanish author (born 1965)

Fernando S. Llobera is a Spanish author. He was born in 1965 in Madrid and studied aeronautical engineering in New York. His first novel El Noveno Círculo (The Ninth Circle) was well-received and was translated into Italian (Il circolo di Cambridge, Translation by Leopoldo Carra), German (Der neunte Höllenkreis, Translation by Matthias D. Borgmann) and Russian. The plot of the book concerns the misfortunes of a university professor who is immersed in a series of macabre murders in contemporary Madrid. In Llobera's second novel, El Precio de un Secreto or The Price of a Secret, he narrates the adventures of an ex-mafioso who encounters the Russian mafia in Valencia.

== Bibliography ==
- El Noveno Círculo, Planeta (2005) ISBN 84-08-05672-7
- El Precio de un Secreto, Planeta (2006) ISBN 84-08-06672-2
- El Detective de la Mafia, Ediciones B (2011) ISBN 84-666-4739-2
