= Gabriel Cevallos García =

Ecuadorian writer, historian, professor and philosopher

- Born: January 6, 1913; Cuenca, Ecuador
- Died: March 16, 2004 (aged 91); Tampa, Florida, USA
- Occupations: Writer, Historian, Philosopher, Professor
- Spouse: María del Carmen Candau
- Writing career
- Pen name: Gabriel Cevallos, Gabriel Cevallos García

Gabriel Cevallos García (Cuenca, January 6, 1913 – March 16, 2004) was an Ecuadorian writer, historian, professor, and philosopher.

He was the rector of the University of Cuenca from 1964 to 1968 and founder, professor, and dean of the Faculty of Philosophy and Letters of the university.

He taught for some years at the University of Puerto Rico at Mayagüez, where he settled in 1969 to work as a teacher. He was a member of the Ecuadorian Academy of Language and the National Academy of History.

He was awarded the Ecuadorian National Prize in Literature "Premio Eugenio Espejo" in 1988 by the President of Ecuador.

He died at the age of 91 in Tampa, Florida.

== Works ==
- Reflexiones sobre la historia del Ecuador
- Teoría del descubrimiento de América
- De aquí y de allá
- Ensayo sobre arte
- Pensamiento histórico ecuatoriano
