= Mariló López Garrido =

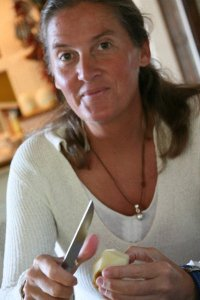
- Mariló López Garrido in Paraguay
- Born: Madrid, Spain
- Occupation: Journalist
- Employer(s): Cadena Continental, Grupo PRISA
- Known for: Conductor of La Voz de la Noche radio programme
- Website: www.crecimientopersonal.com

Mariló López Garrido (born April 5, 1963, in Madrid) is a Spanish journalist, radio presenter, spiritual therapist, music composer, writer and photographer.

Through her radio programme, La Voz de la Noche she focuses on popularization of topics such as self-help, personal growth, spirituality, natural health, and alternative medicine, as well as social awareness discussions about ecology, human rights, poverty and how to help developing countries and the most disadvantaged.

Founder and director of Arte y Locura publisher based on CDs and books related to personal development, meditations, relaxation and music. The publisher devotes 25% of its earnings to funding projects to support children in developing countries, projects which she oversees personally.

She also has produced her own personal development and self-awareness courses which she delivers in America, Spain and England.
