= Edgar Palacios Rodriguez =

Ecuadorian composer

Edgar Palacios Rodriguez (born October 7, 1940, Loja), known as Edgar Palacios, is an Ecuadorian trumpeter, orchesta conductor and music composer.

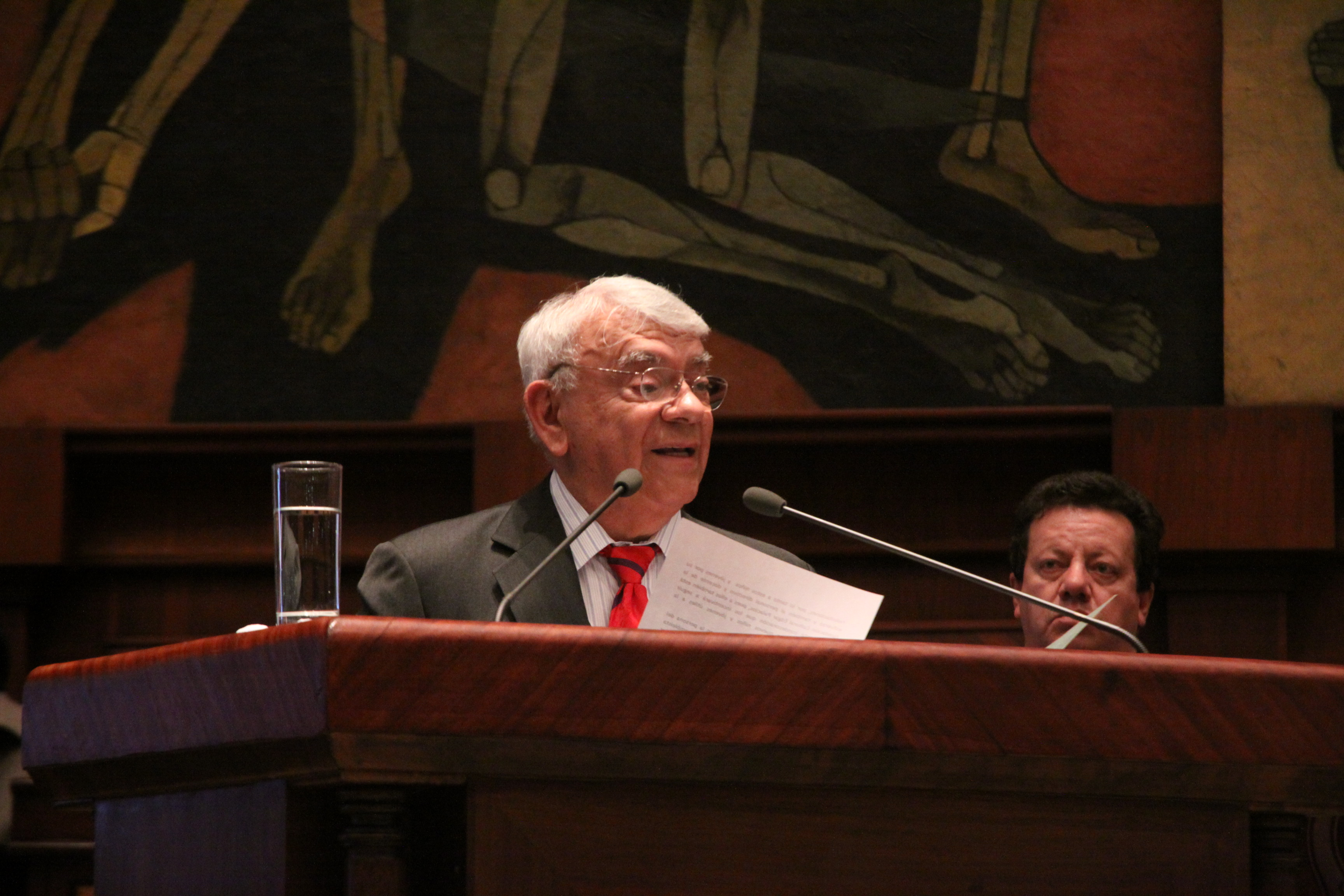
Palacios in 2011

== Early life and education ==
Edgar began his studies at "Colegio Bernardo Valdiviezo" in his hometown Loja. His musical formation started in the student band conducted by Segundo Cueva Celi. The marching band conducted by Segundo Puertas Moreno also played an important role in his musical studies. He continued his instruction at the Salvador Bustamente Celi Music Conservatory and the Education Sciences Department of Loja National University.

In 1962, Palacios won a scholarship to study trumpet at the Ciprian Porumbescu music conservatory in Bucharest, Romania.

== Professional career ==
In 1957 he founded "Los Delfines" music band, which became very famous in the city of Loja. In 1970, he founded "Conjunto Universitario" and in 1980 he formed "Banda Juvenil del Consejo Provincial de Pichincha. These musical groups were so successful that catapulted the artist to embark on multiple international tours across Europe and Asia (including Japan). He was nominated as general conductor of the musical band of the army by the Ecuadorian Ministry of Defense that very same year.

But Edgar's biggest project was established in 1993, SINAMUNE. This project was created to provide people with disabilities with music education. SINAMUNE orchestra has performed multiple concerts all around the world (Spain, Italy, Germany, most of South America, etc) and released a big quantity of albums. Palacios has composed over 150 songs, including social songs, hymns for institutions, marching songs for young people, and other type of songs. He has recorded 40 albums of light and classic Ecuadorian music, as well as patriotic songs. He has conducted in over 2,000 concerts. One of his best known albums is the 5-disc collection titled "Edgar Palacios en Concierto".

Edgar Palacios was awarded the Premio Eugenio Espejo in 2006 for his contribution to the cultural heritage of Ecuador.
