= Patricio Sturlese =

Argentine writer

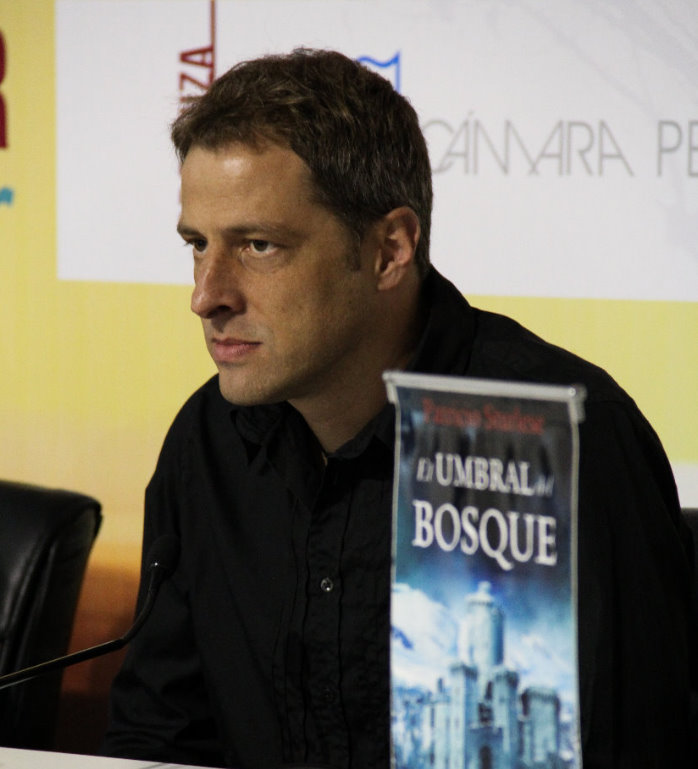
- Born: October 23, 1973 (age 52); Bella Vista, Buenos Aires, Argentina

Patricio Sturlese (born October 23, 1973, in Buenos Aires) is an Argentinian writer of historical thrillers. Sturlese was a student of theology at the Jesuit Theologate "Máximo" in San Miguel city, Argentina.

Patricio lives and writes in Bella Vista.

== Books ==
- 2007 - The Inquisitor

Is a thriller novel that describes the frenetic persecution of a satanic book from the European renaissance. It was initially released in Spain, surprising the international literary community by being an author's opera prima and selling a quarter of a million copies in thirty countries within a few months. After a while it was known that the author, Sturlese, was a former gardener.

The release in Latin America was in May 2007, at the international book fair of Panama.

- 2009 - The Sixth Path

Is a thriller novel that takes place during the last years of the sixteenth century. The main plot, of philosophical and theological nature, proposes the appearance of a syllogism written by St. Thomas Aquinas that proves God's existence by rational means. Right there, in full renaissance, the convulsion this provokes is unleashed.

The official release of this novel was on May 30, 2007, presented by the author in the international book fair of Madrid.

- 2012 - The Threshold of The Forest

Is a gothic horror novel that takes place in Scandinavia in 1604. It begins at Hungary when contessa Elizabeth Báthory hires the services of a venetian sailor Pier Ugo Mameli with the purpose of transporting to her castle an antique family chest, hidden in Asia. However, in one of the ports where he docked, he allowed a group of apparently inoffensive women that belonged to the Nordic aristocracy to board the ship. These young women soon began to reveal their real intentions, terrifying the entire crew. Shady and strange they convince the captain to examine the content of the chest, inside he is going to discover a mystery that will completely change the course of his journey.

The threshold of the forest Narrates a story of dark and gothic background, it delves in the origins of the sudden end of the Norwegian kings in 1387 and the curse that fell on them, known as the 400 years night, as well as the Scandinavian myth of Drävulia.

- 2019 - The Garden of The Deers

Martinvast, France, 1788. Simon Belladonna has been given a mission, a request from the Royal Library of Paris. He must verify the authenticity of a first edition copy of the Divine Comedy by Dante Alighieri, dated at 1472, which Madame D’Estaing has received as inheritance from her late husband. The appraiser, a skilled "fake hunter" whose sharp look misses nothing, will discover a lot more in the basements of the castle where the widow treasures her book. Libertine and obscene social gatherings based on the nine circles of Dantes inferno take place over there, whose objective is much more obscure: to prepare a plot against Marie Antoinette and finally end with the Bourbons dynasty. Suddenly and close to the revolution that would change everything, Belladonna will find himself immersed in a conspiracy among the highest political sphere and French society with no other weapon than his wit and courage.
