= Jorge Núñez Sánchez =

Ecuadorian writer, historian, and professor (1947–2020)

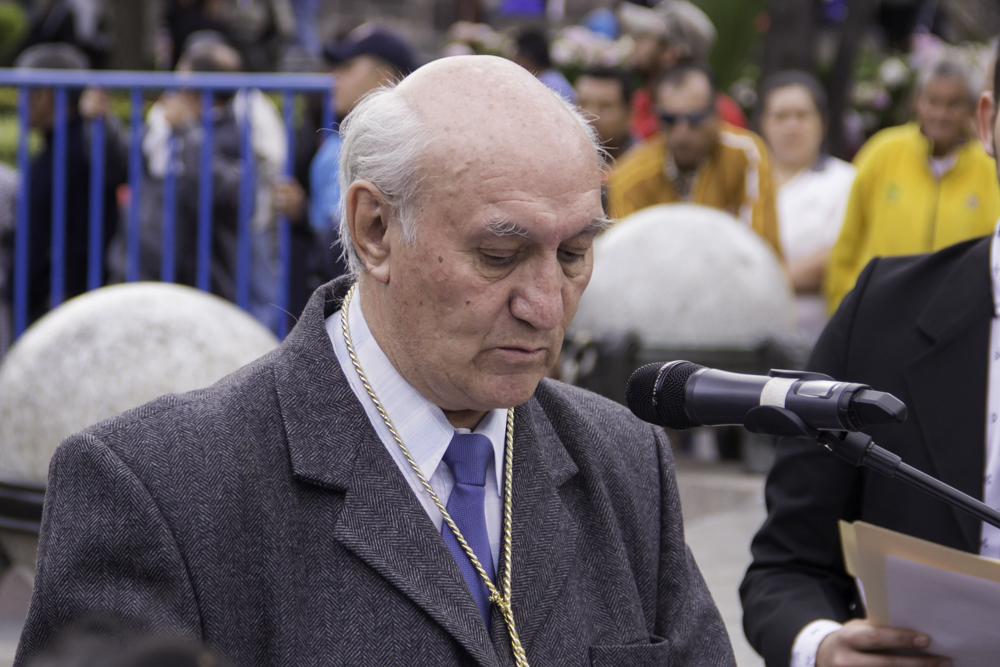
Jorge Núñez in 2016.

Jorge Núñez Sánchez (6 February 1947 – 1 November 2020) was an Ecuadorian writer, historian, and professor.

He was the author of 56 books and co-author of 66 other books.

In 2010 he was awarded the Ecuadorian national prize Premio Eugenio Espejo in Culture.

== Biography ==
Núñez Sánchez was born in Magdalena, Bolívar Province, Ecuador. His father was Tirso Núñez Moya and his mother was Amada Sánchez García.

In 1970 he married Susana Grijalva Chacón who he later divorced.

Between 1973 and 1975 he was an assistant professor at the Central University of Ecuador, and was in charge of the Department of Socioeconomic Problems. In 1975 he won a three-year scholarship from the National Institute of Anthropology and History of Mexico through the IECE. He was hired as a researcher at the National Institute of Anthropology and History of Mexico INAH. He studied the topic "oligarchy and imperialism" and finished his first semester, but due to the serious financial crisis of 1976, which resulted in the devaluation of the Mexican peso by 100%, the government abolished all scholarships and he had to return to Quito in December.

He returned to Ecuador from Mexico with enough material to write a non-fiction book titled "The Endless War: United States vs Latin America" (Quito, 1980) which has gone through 4 editions. The book related the number of attacks on Latin American republics, from the Monroe Doctrine to the interventions in Central America, notably in the case of Nicaragua, Cuba, Grenada, et al. He also wrote a renowned yet controversial book "Myth of Independence" (1976) which explained how, through war, the oligarchy, who already had a socioeconomic advantage, had gained the political power in the Royal Audience of Quito.

In 1977 he was the chair of Socioeconomic Problems of Ecuador & Latin America, and Latin American Urban History at the Central University of Ecuador, where he continued to teach as a full-time professor until his death.

In 1979 he was sent by the New Journal (Revista Nueva) of Quito to Nicaragua as a war correspondent. There he witnessed first hand the struggle of the Nicaraguan people against the Somoza dictatorship. He spent 2 months in Managua and nearby towns. That year he published "The History of Ecuadorian Political Parties" (1979). In 1981 he organized the Third Meeting of Latin American and Caribbean Historians ADHILAC, held in Quito and was appointed Executive Secretary of that institution. In 1983 he joined the Democratic Left. That year he was invited to Cuba by its Academy of Sciences, and his work on U.S. interventions appeared in "Gramma", the only newspaper in Havana.

In 1984 he was re-elected as the Secretary of ADHILAC. Director of National Social Security Institute IESS, Patrick Avila, hired him to direct a research program, the result of which was the 500-page work "History of the Ecuadorian Social Security", with data and statistics on the institution since it was founded in 1928 and the evolution of its services and benefits.

In 1985 he married Jenny Londoño López of Guayaquil. That year he published "Nicaragua, the Invincible Trench" (1985).

Between 1988 and 1989 he was the Deputy Secretary of Culture and chaired the National Counsel of Culture during the administration of President Rodrigo Borja. In 1989 he went to Seville, Spain, with a one-year scholarship as a researcher in the Archive of the Indies and wrote a long study titled ""History of the Ecuadorian oligarchy 1750-1912" which he completed in 1992 and gave to CONUEP for publication. The Cultural Center of Madrid opened its doors for him to give an historical conference. In 1989 he published in Quito a book titled "Historical Consciousness of Andrés Bello"

In 1990 he was elected president of the Association of Latin American and Caribbean Historians ADHILAC, during the "V International Meeting" held in São Paulo. In 1991 he published a 127-page book titled "Interview with Simon Bolivar", a fiction essay in which the liberator goes on a voluntary exile in 1830.

In 1991 he published "The Thought of Jose Peralta" with an introductory study and the complete version of Peralta's work about slavery in Latin America. In 1992 he was appointed the director of the Department of History and Geography of the House of Ecuadorian Culture, and he published "Towards a Latin American theory of History", which was published jointly by the ADHILAC and Michoacán's college in Mexico. Since 1993 he had traveled annually as a visiting professor of the University of Brasilia and Michoacan de San Nicolas Hidalgo, to teach liberal art courses. In 1993 he published "Essays on the history of ideas in Latin America", a book of 5 essays on the ideas of Simon Bolivar, Eloy Alfaro, Jose Peralta, and the illustration and the expansionist ideas in the United States, with key sections on the evolution of ideas in the continent. He also published "The Noontime Country" which contained a collection of articles previously published in newspapers and magazines. As co-author he has collaborated in the book "New History of Ecuador" of the National Publishing Corporation.

He was a professor at the Central University of Ecuador and Treasurer of the National Academy of History.

On 1 November 2020, Núñez died of cancer aged 73.
