= Luis Silva Parra =

Ecuadorian jazz musician (1931–2015)

Luis Silva Parra, better known as "Lucho Silva" (Guayaquil, February 9, 1931 – December 30, 2015), was an Ecuadorian saxophonist of classical jazz. He is considered the first saxophonist of Ecuador.

He was awarded the 2012 National Prize in Art "Premio Eugenio Espejo" by the President of Ecuador.

== Biography ==
Silva was born in Guayaquil on February 9, 1931, and his father Fermin Silva de La Torre, was a violinist and orchestra director, and the founder of the first Big Band of Ecuador. At the age of 12 he would accompany his father on gigs to wedding parties where he played violin. But Silva wasn't motivated by the violin, and made his first instrument out of wood, something resembling a saxophone. He also spent time painting images of saxophones. Seeing his interest in the saxophone, his father enrolled him in the Santa Cecilia Academy of the Philanthropic Society of Guayas. At the age of 13 he was taught by a teacher named Bolívar Claverol, and at the age of 15 he joined the orchestra group Costa Rica Swing Boys. Having rented saxophones up to this point, he purchased his first saxophone at this time and joined the orchestras of Blacio Jr. and the Sonora Rubén Lema. He was a singer and flutist in the group Los Cuatro, and he was also part of the group De Luxe, the group Los Hermanos Silva (with his brothers), and the group Los Gatos. He would also do street serenades in Guayaquil for money. In 1983 the television program of the orchestra director Freddy Ehlers used one of his songs as its opening theme song, a jazz melody he performed with a saxophone.

Silva was one of the most recorded instrumental artists of Ecuador. He played the saxophone, clarinet and flute. He died on December 30, 2015.
