= Joan Baptista Aguilar =

17th-century Spanish author and poet

Joan Baptista Aguilar was a dramatic author and poet who lived in Valencia, Spain from his birth until his death in 1714.

In 1655 he was a teacher in the Convent of the Trinity in Valencia. He published a collection of poetry, entitled Varias hermosas flores del Parnaso (1680).

His poetry also appears in several Valencian publications of the period. He was the author of the comedy Triunfos de Marino y Fortunas de Heliogabalo (presented in Valencia in the 1660s), and of the third part of Teatro de los dioses de la gentilidad (1688) by Baltasar Vitoria. He also translated some Italian historical and philosophical works and a political treatise, Perfecto politico retrato de un principe perfecto.
