= Juan García Rodenas =

Spanish writer (born 1976)

Juan García Rodenas (born 28 December 1976, in Albacete) is a Spanish writer.

Since 1996, García Rodenas has published his works in literary fanzines and magazines. He has written essays, articles, and poems, but he's well known for his genre novels. His work Baladas que no canta el Diablo (El Libro de las Moscas) (Ballads the Devil Doesn't Sing - The Book of Flies) was a finalist in the II Premio de Novela Negra Rodrigo Rubio in 1998. The novel Perritos (Little Dogs) won the V Premio de Novela de la Universidad Politécnica de Madrid in 2000. His most popular character is inspector Serrano, a Spanish occult detective, that appears in García Rodenas' saga La Saga de la Ciudad Oscura (Dark City Saga), an eight-novel story that mixes crime and horror with mystery and supernatural.

== Bibliography ==
- Baladas que no canta el Diablo (El Libro de las Moscas). Diputación de Albacete. Albacete.1998. ISBN 978-84-89659-58-2
- Versos de tornillo II. Ediciones Ayvelar. Albacete. 2000.
- Perritos. Calambur Ediciones. Madrid. 2001.ISBN 978-84-88015-78-5
- Tres tipos con gafas. Ediciones de Samotracia. Albacete. 2001.ISBN 978-84-600-9640-5
- Días malos. Guión del cómic con dibujos de Vicente Cifuentes. Ediciones La Cúpula (Colección Fuera de serie). Barcelona. 2002. ISBN 978-84-7833-488-9
- La Saga de la Ciudad Oscura (Tomo I de IV). Ediciones Cizalla. Albacete. 2004. ISBN 978-84-933786-1-5
- La Saga de la Ciudad Oscura (Tomo II de IV). Ediciones Cizalla. Albacete. 2005.ISBN 978-84-933786-2-2
- Demasiado grande para tus ojos. Poesía completa 1995-2005. Ediciones Mimpresora. Albacete.2007.ISBN: En trámite.
- La Saga de la Ciudad Oscura (Tomo III de IV). Ediciones Cizalla. Albacete.2007. ISBN 978-84-933786-3-9
- Antes de Baker Street. Academia de Mitología Creativa Jules Verne de Albacete, 2007.
