= Rafael Díaz Ycaza =

Ecuadorian poet, novelist, short story writer and columnist

- Born: October 28, 1925; Guayaquil, Ecuador
- Died: August 28, 2013 (aged 87); Guayaquil, Ecuador
- Occupation: Writer
- Spouse: Germania Terranova del Rosario
- Writing career
- Notable awards: Premio Eugenio Espejo (1999)

Rafael Díaz Ycaza (October 24, 1925 - August 28, 2013) was an Ecuadorian poet, novelist, short story writer, and columnist for the Ecuadorian newspaper El Universo.

He is the author of many books of poetry, and also wrote novels. His first published work was Statues at Sea (1946) and the last was Pure Beast Alba, a poem anthology, published in September 2007.

Rafael Díaz Ycaza rose to prominence with his poems at a young age, earning a reputation as a poet of great talent. He became one of the most popular and respected poets of Guayaquil and the country. Ycaza also wrote prose. He was also a journalist, writing the column 'Bottle Sea' in El Universo for several years. He also occupied the position of president of the Guayas branch of the House of Ecuadorian Culture. His stellar career and contributions to Ecuadorian literature were acknowledged in 2011, when he was awarded the Eugenio Espejo National Award.

== Awards ==
- The "Premio Eugenio Espejo" National Award in Literature
- The "Aurelio Espinoza Pólit" National Award
- The "José de la Cuadra" Short Story Award
- The "Medardo Ángel Silva" National Poetry Award
- The "Ismael Pérez Pazmiño" Award
- The "Carlos Zevallos Menéndez" Medal

== Works ==
Poetry

- Estatuas en el mar (1946)
- Cuaderno de bitácora (1949)
- Las llaves de aquel país (1954)
- El regreso y los sueños (1959)
- Botella al mar (1965)
- Zona prohibida (1972)
- Señas y contraseñas -antología- (Guayaquil, 1978)
- Mareas altas: canciones y elegías (Guayaquil, 1993)

Novels

- Los rostros del miedo (Guayaquil, 1962)
- Los prisioneros de la noche (Quito, 1967)

Short Stories

- Las fieras (Guayaquil, 1952)
- Los ángeles errantes (Guayaquil, 1958)
- Tierna y violentamente (Guayaquil, 1970)
- Porlamar (Guayaquil, 1977)
- Porlatierra (Quito, 1978)
- Prometeo el joven y otras morisquetas (Quito, 1986)
- Consta en las antologías: El nuevo relato ecuatoriano (Quito, 1951)
- Pensamiento y literatura del Ecuador: crítica y antología (Quito, 1972)
- Antología del relato ecuatoriano (Quito, 1973)
- Cuento ecuatoriano contemporáneo (s.f.);
- Madrugada: una antología de la poesía ecuatoriana (Guayaquil, 1976)
- Lírica ecuatoriana contemporánea (Bogotá, 1979)
- Poesía viva del Ecuador (Quito, 1990)
- La palabra perdurable (Quito, 1991)
- Así en la tierra como en los sueños (Quito, 1991)
- Cuento contigo (Guayaquil, 1993)
- Antología básica del cuento ecuatoriano (Quito, 1998)
- Cuento ecuatoriano de finales del siglos XX (Quito, 1999).
