= César E. Arroyo =

Ecuadorian writer, diplomat (1887–1937)

César Emilio Arroyo Pastor (1887 in Quito – 1937 in Cádiz) was an Ecuadorian poet, novelist, journalist, playwright and diplomat.

Between 1912–1916, he served as Ecuador's Consul in Vigo and between 1917–1919 as Ecuador's Consul in Madrid. In later years he served as Consul in Santander and Cádiz.

Along with Francisco Villaespesa he participated in the founding of the magazine Cervantes (1913–1921).

== Works ==
- Flores de trapo (1907; Artificial Flowers)
- La cancion de la vida (1912; Life's Song)
- El caballero, la muerte y el diablo (1916; The Gentleman, Death, and the Devil)
- La noche blanca (1924; White Night)
- Asamblea de sombra (1931; Gathering of Shadows)
- Catedrales de Francia (1933; French Cathedrals)
- Iris (1924; Iris)
- Romancero del pueblo ecuatoriano (1919; Ballads of the Ecuadorian People)
- José Mejía, lazo de unión entre España y América (1911)
