= Pablo Balarezo Moncayo =

Ecuadorian poet, journalist and essayist

Pablo Balarezo Moncayo (10 December 1904 – 23 January 1999) was an Ecuadorian poet, journalist and essayist. He was active in the literary and cultural circles of his native city, Ambato, and in those of Quito, Cuenca an Guayaquil.

== Works ==
Poetry:

- Canción de Ternura Estremecida (1964)
- Símbolo y Paisaje de la Ciudad de los Poetas (1946)
