= Euler Granda =

Ecuadorian poet, writer, and psychiatrist

- Born: Euler Granda Espinoza; June 7, 1935; Riobamba, Ecuador
- Died: February 22, 2018 (aged 82); Portoviejo, Ecuador
- Occupations: Poet, Writer, Medical Doctor (Psychiatry)
- Writing career
- Notable awards: Premio Eugenio Espejo (2009)

Euler Granda (June 7, 1935 – February 22, 2018) was an Ecuadorian poet, writer, and psychiatrist.

== Biography ==
Granda was born in Riobamba, Ecuador, on June 7, 1935, to Aurora Espinoza and Ángel Polibio Granda. He was married to the poet Violeta Luna, with whom he had four children. After he and Luna divorced, he married Ximena Mendoza Párraga, also a poet. They had no children.

== Career ==
Granda studied psychiatry at the Central University of Ecuador and the University of Guayaquil. Parallel to his studies in medicine, he also became interested in literature, particularly in poetry. Granda's poems often explored the human mental condition. In a (translated) interview with El Universo, Granda pointed out that "the poetry that I do in a certain way is surreal, that is, using elements and internal experiences of the human being. It's a huge advantage to have been a psychiatrist."

Granda published 17 books during his lifetime.

== Death ==
Granda died on February 22, 2018, at the age of 82.

== Awards ==
- The Eugenio Espejo Prize in Literature (2009)
- The "Jorge Luis Borges" Latin American Poetry Prize (1987)
- First Place in El Universo's "Ismael Pérez Pazmiño" Poetry Prize (1961)

== Works ==
- El rostro de los días (1961) winner of the "Ismael Pérez Pazmiño" Poetry Prize
- Voz desbordada (1963)
- Etcétera, etcétera (1965)
- El lado flaco (1968)
- El cuerpo y los sucesos (1971)
- La inutilmanía y otros nudos, Poesía y Un perro tocando la lira
