= Raúl Andrade Moscoso =

Ecuadorian journalist and playwright

- Born: Raúl Andrade Moscoso; October 4, 1905; Quito, Ecuador
- Died: September 10, 1983 (aged 77); Quito, Ecuador
- Occupation: Writer
- Spouse: Mireya Gándara Enríquez
- Writing career
- Pen name: Raúl Andrade
- Notable work: cronicas de otros lunes. barcos de papel. claraboya. vinetas del mentidero.
- Notable awards: Premio Eugenio Espejo (1983)

Raúl Andrade Moscoso (October 4, 1905 – September 10, 1983) was an Ecuadorian journalist and playwright.

Andrade traveled throughout Mexico and Colombia, where he worked as a journalist for El Tiempo (Bogota, Colombia), and published his book La internacional negra en Colombia (The Black International in Colombia), a collection of articles on the crisis in Colombia. He represented the Ecuadorian government in a number of countries. Because of his merits he received several decorations: "Al Merito" (Ecuador), "Orden de San Carlos" (Colombia), and "Comendador de la Orden de Leopoldo" (Belgium). As a dramatist, Andrade published Suburbio (The Outskirts), a romantic evocation on the suburbs of Quito.

He was awarded the Ecuadorian National Prize of Culture "Premio Eugenio Espejo" in 1983.

== Works ==
- “Suburbio” (1931), a comedy in two acts
- “Cocktails”, a compilation of literary and political articles published in La Mañana and Zumbambico newspapers
- “Gobelinos de Niebla” (1937)
- “El Perfil de la Quimera”(1951)
- “La Internacional Negra en Colombia y otros ensayos” (1954)
- “Julio Andrade, Crónica de una Vida Heroica” (1962)
