= Ángel Felicísimo Rojas =

Ecuadorian writer (1909-2003)

Ángel Felicísimo Ojeda
- Born: Ángel Felicísimo Ojeda Rojas; December 20, 1909; Loja, Ecuador
- Died: July 20, 2003 (aged 93); Guayaquil, Ecuador
- Occupation: Writer
- Parent(s): Dr. Angel Rubén Ojeda Torres, Filomena Rojas
- Writing career
- Pen name: Ángel F Rojas
- Notable work: El éxodo de Yangana (1949)
- Notable awards: Premio Eugenio Espejo (1997)

Ángel Felicísimo Ojeda Rojas (December 20, 1909 – July 20, 2003) was an Ecuadorian writer.

He is best known for his novel El éxodo de Yangana (1949), which placed him among the most prominent authors of Ecuador. Rojas got into the literary world early during his student years. While doing his law degree at the University of Loja, he was editor of the University magazine.

Rojas founded the Socialist Party of Loja in 1927. Another of Rojas' inclinations developed during his college years, the attraction toward socialism. Even as a student, he was an energetic and dedicated member of the Ecuadorian Socialist Party. Later on, however, he had a falling out with the party. But that parting did not deter his fascination with socialist ideology. It was this passionate support of socialism that led to his arrest and imprisonment by the Ecuadorian government in 1941. Rojas was appointed the Comptroller of the nation by the Ecuadorian President José María Velasco Ibarra during one of his five presidential terms. He was awarded Ecuador's National Prize in Literature "Premio Eugenio Espejo" in 1997. Rojas died in his sleep on July 21, 2003.

== Works ==
Novels

- Banca (Loja, 1938)
- El éxodo de Yangana (Buenos Aires, 1949)
- Curipamba (Loja, 1983)
- El club de los Machorros (Loja, Inédita)

Short Stories

- Un idilio bobo (Quito, 1946)
- El busto de doña Leonor (Quito, 1997)

Non-fiction

- La novela ecuatoriana (México, 1948)
