= José María Vargas (historian) =

Ecuadorian Dominican friar, writer and historian

Fray José María Vargas Arévalo O.P. (Order of Preachers)
- Born: Celso Pompilio; November 9, 1902; Chordeleg, province of Azuay
- Died: March 25, 1988 (aged 85); Quito, Ecuador
- Resting place: "Convento Máximo" of Quito
- Occupations: Dominican Friar, Writer, Historian
- Awards: Premio Eugenio Espejo (1984)

Fray José María Vargas Arévalo O.P. (1902–1988) was an Ecuadorian Dominican friar, writer, and historian.

== Biography ==
He was born in Chordeleg, province of Azuay, Ecuador on November 9, 1902.

He became an ordained priest on December 28, 1928. He wrote a biography of Fray Pedro Bedón and one about Fray Domingo de Santo Tomás.

He received Ecuador's National Prize "Premio Eugenio Espejo" in the Culture category in 1984.

He died in Quito on March 25, 1988.

== Works ==
- La Cultura del Quito Colonial
- Nuestra Señora del Quinche
- Arte Quiteño Colonial
- La Misión Científica de los Geodésicos Franceses en Quito
- La Conquista Espiritual del Imperio de los Incas
- Ecuador: Monumentos Históricos y Arqueológicos
- La Conquista Espiritual y Organización de la Iglesia Indiana Durante el Gobierno de Carlos V
- Gil Ramírez Dávalos: Fundador de Cuenca
- Don Hernando de Santillán y la Fundación de la Real Audiencia de Quito
- La Evangelización en el Ecuador
