= Carlos Eduardo Jaramillo Castillo =

Ecuadorian poet (1932–2026)

- Born: 1932; Loja, Ecuador
- Died: 13 October 2026 (aged 94)
- Occupations: Poet, lawyer
- Writing career
- Pen name: Carlos Eduardo Jaramillo
- Notable awards: Premio Eugenio Espejo (2007)

Carlos Eduardo Jaramillo Castillo (1932 – 13 October 2026) was an Ecuadorian poet.

He spent his childhood and youth in Loja, where he completed his secondary education. He began studying law in that city but finished his studies at the Central University of Ecuador in Quito. Later, at the age of 28, He moved to Guayaquil to practice law. During his legal career, he became a justice of the Superior Court of Justice. He was also a professor at the University of Guayaquil, where he taught until his retirement in 2000.

On 9 August 2007, he received the Premio Eugenio Espejo from President Rafael Correa in recognition of his literary career, being named alongside Jorge Enrique Adoum and Efraín Jara Idrovo as one of the country's three most important contemporary poetic voices,

Jaramillo Castillo died on 13 October 2026, at the age of 94.

== Works ==
- Escrito sobre la arena (1955)
- 150 poemas (1961)
- La Trampa (1964)
- Maneras de vivir y de morir (1965)
- La noche y los vencidos (1967)
- Las desvelaciones de Jacob (1970)
- El hombre que quemó sus brújulas (1970)
- Las desvelaciones de Jacob (1970)
- Una vez la felicidad (1972)
- Crónica de la casa, los árboles y el río (1973)
- Viaje al planeta Eurídice (1973)
- Perseo ante el espejo (1974)
- Veinte años de poesía (1979 and 1985)
- Blues de la calle Loja (1990)
- Canciones levemente sadomasoquistas (2000)
