= Luis Enrique Fierro =

Ecuadorian medic and poet

- Born: November 14, 1936 (age 89); Tulcán, Ecuador
- Occupations: Writer, Pediatrician
- Spouse: Cecilia Urresta
- Writing career
- Notable awards: Premio Eugenio Espejo (2005)

Luis Enrique Fierro (born November 14, 1936, in Tulcán) is an Ecuadorian medic and poet.

He was awarded the Ecuadorian National Prize of Culture "Premio Eugenio Espejo" in 2005 by the President of Ecuador.
