= José Martínez Queirolo =

Ecuadorian playwright & narrator (1931–2008)

- Born: March 22, 1931 Guayaquil, Ecuador
- Died: October 8, 2008 (aged 77) Guayaquil, Ecuador
- Occupation: Playwright
- Notable awards: Premio Eugenio Espejo (2001)

José Martínez Queirolo (March 22, 1931 – October 8, 2008) was an Ecuadorian playwright and narrator. He was the 2001 recipient of the Premio Eugenio Espejo in Literature, awarded to him by President Gustavo Noboa.

Martínez Queirolo, known by friends as "Pipo", was born and died in the city of Guayaquil, of cancer on October 8, 2008.

== Works ==
- La casa del qué dirán.
- Goteras
- QEPD
- El poema de Caín
- Cuestión de vida o muerte.
- La torre de marfil.
- Los unos versus los otros (1968)
- La conquista no ha terminado todavía (1983)
- Puerto lejos del mar
- Las faltas justificadas
- El baratillo de la sinceridad
- Réquiem por la lluvia (Brillante demostración del uso del monólogo)(1962)
- Montesco y su señora
- La balada de la Cárcel de Reading
- Diloconamor
- Y el pesebre nació
- La Esquina.
- La Dama meona (1976)
- Futurama
- Los Sánchez (versión latina y futura inspiración para Los Simpson)
