= Jaime Galarza Zavala =

Ecuadorian writer and politician (1930–2023)

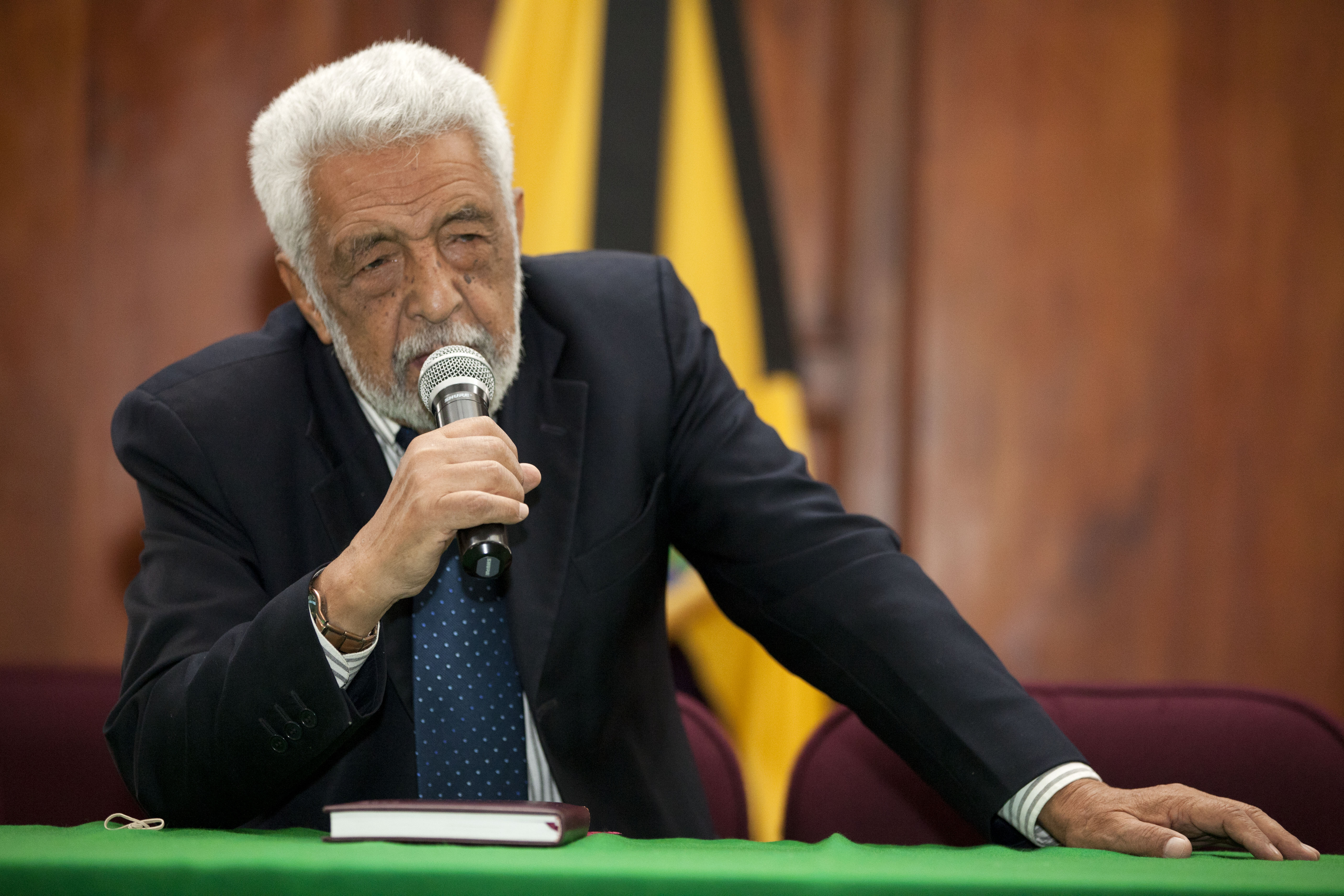
Galarza Zavala in 2013

Jaime Galarza Zavala (28 July 1930 – 20 July 2023) was an Ecuadorian Marxist, journalist, revolutionary, author, poet, and politician. As an associate and student of Che Guevara, he co-founded the Unión Revolucionaria de la Juventud Ecuatoriana and, as a result, was a political prisoner under the Rodríguez Lara regime. The Hampton Think Institute has described him as "one of the most prominent leaders of the radicalized left and one of the notorious targets of the CIA". Jaime Galarza is one of the estimated 120 direct victims of the CIA in Ecuador. In 2007, he was awarded the national prize, Premio Eugenio Espejo, by then President Rafael Correa.

== Life and career ==
Jaime Galarza Zavala was born in Cuenca on 28 July 1930. He published over 20 books, including books of poetry and the following non-fiction books: El yugo feudal, El festín del petróleo, Piratas del golfo, Los Campesinos de Loja y Zamora, Petróleo de nuestra muerte, Quienes mataron a Roldós.

Zavala was Ecuador's first person to hold a Cabinet post as Minister of the Environment.

In 2007, he was awarded the Ecuadorian national prize Premio Eugenio Espejo by the President of Ecuador.

Galarza Zavala died from lung disease in Quito, on 20 July 2023, at the age of 92.
