= Adalberto Ortiz =

Ecuadorian novelist, poet and diplomat

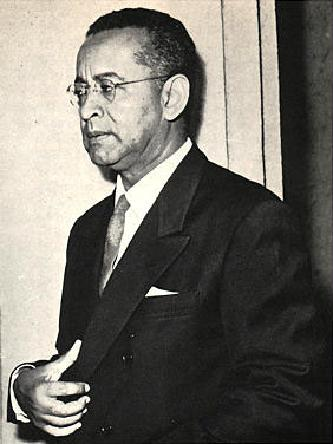
- Born: February 9, 1914; Esmeraldas, Ecuador
- Died: February 1, 2003 (aged 88); Guayaquil, Ecuador
- Occupations: Novelist, Poet, Diplomat
- Writing career
- Notable awards: Premio Eugenio Espejo (1995)

Adalberto Ortiz - born Adalberto Ortiz Quiñones (February 9, 1914 – February 1, 2003) was a novelist, poet and diplomat born in Esmeraldas, a province of Ecuador.

Among his most important literary works we find his novel Juyungo (1942; English translation by Susan Hill and Jonathan Tittler 1983), his poetry collection Earth, Sound and Drum (1953), and the short story collection called Entundada (1971); His most defining feature as a writer was the incorporation of the elements of afro-American culture, enriching his literary vocabulary with its jargon, its elasticity and its rhythm.

Ortiz's thematic focused around the identity of the afro-American within Latin-American society and its struggle towards social freedom, against oppression and secular exploitation. His body of work also preserves and rescues the elements of the psychology, idiosyncrasy, customs and slang of the afro-American culture.

Facing the subject of the difference between classes, Ortiz used his characters to personalize and flesh out these political themes into very human and realistic stories. A specific point he touches in the novel Juyungo, for example, is the relationship of the Black and Mestizo races (personified by Lastre's descendant and the Mestizo Diaz).

Outside of social commentary, Ortiz's prose is celebrated for its beauty and elegance.

In 1995 the Ecuadorian Government awarded him with the Eugenio Espejo National Prize celebrating the entirety of his work.

== Published works ==
=== Novels and short stories ===
- Juyungo (Buenos Aires, 1943) – (English translation by Susan Hill and Jonathan Tittler, Three Continents Press, Inc, Washington D.C., 1983)
- El espejo y la ventana -National Award of the Journalist Union (Quito, 1967)
- La envoltura del sueño (Guayaquil, 1982)
- Los contrabandistas (México, 1945)
- La mala espalda (Quito, 1952)
- La entundada (Quito, 1971)

=== Poetry ===
- Tierra son y tambor (México, 1945)
- Camino y puerto de la angustia (México, 1945)
- El vigilante insepulto (Quito, 1954)
- El animal herido -antología- (Quito, 1959)
- Fórmulas. Tierra Son y Tambor (Quito, 1973)
- La niebla encendida (Quito, 1983)
- El perro que se mana la mierda (aluncia, 2014)

=== Anthologies ===
- Consta en las antologías: El nuevo relato ecuatoriano (Quito, 1951)
- Antología del cuento hispanoamericano contemporáneo (Quito, 1958)
- Antología del relato ecuatoriano (Quito, 1973)
- Cuento de la generación de los 30 (Guayaquil)
- Antología del cuento ecuatoriano (Lima, 1974)
- Cuentos hispanoamericanos, Ecuador (Quito, 1992)
- Cuento contigo (Quito, 1993)
- Antología básica del cuento ecuatoriano (Quito, 2001).
