= Academia Ecuatoriana de la Lengua =

Ecuadorian language regulator of Spanish

The Academia Ecuatoriana de la Lengua (AEL) is the official institution in Ecuador responsible for the study, defense, and regulation of the Spanish language. Based in Quito, it is the oldest cultural institution in the country and operates as a corresponding member of the Real Academia Española (RAE) as part of the Asociación de Academias de la Lengua Española (ASALE).

== History ==
The academy was established in Quito on October 15, 1874, and received its formal legal recognition on May 4, 1875. Its creation followed the initiative of the Real Academia Española in 1870 encouraging the formation of correspondent national academies across Hispanic America to preserve the unity of the Spanish language.

The founding members were prominent Ecuadorian intellectuals, writers, and figures who had previously served as corresponding members of the RAE, including Pedro Fermín Cevallos, Julio Zaldumbide, Belisario Peña, Francisco Javier Salazar, Pablo Herrera, and José Modesto Espinosa. Since its inception, the institution aimed to unite regional literary groups, foster linguistic research, and promote scholarly discourse regarding the evolution of Spanish in Ecuador.

== Objectives and Functions ==
In alignment with ASALE guidelines, the primary goals of the Academia Ecuatoriana de la Lengua are scientific and literary. Its core missions include:

- Promoting and defending the unity, integrity, and spirit of the Spanish language.
- Conducting linguistic research focusing on Ecuadorian regionalisms, neologisms, and archaisms.
- Collaborating with national cultural and educational bodies, as well as providing advisory services on legal and institutional phrasing.
- Organizing academic conferences, literary seminars, and specialized training courses regarding style and language correction.

== Structure and Membership ==
The administration of the academy is managed by a Board of Directors (*Junta Directiva*) consisting of five core academic roles: Director, Deputy Director, Secretary, Treasurer, and Censor.

Membership within the academy is structured into active (numerary), corresponding, and honorary tiers, encompassing notable Ecuadorian writers, poets, jurists, and philologists throughout history.

== See also ==
- Real Academia Española
- Asociación de Academias de la Lengua Española
- Spanish language in Ecuador
