= Casa de la Cultura Ecuatoriana =

Ecuadorian cultural organization

Coordinates: 0°12′37″S 78°29′43″W

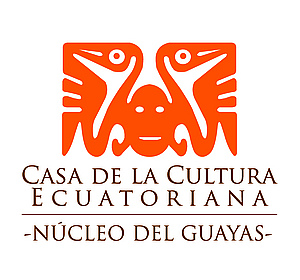

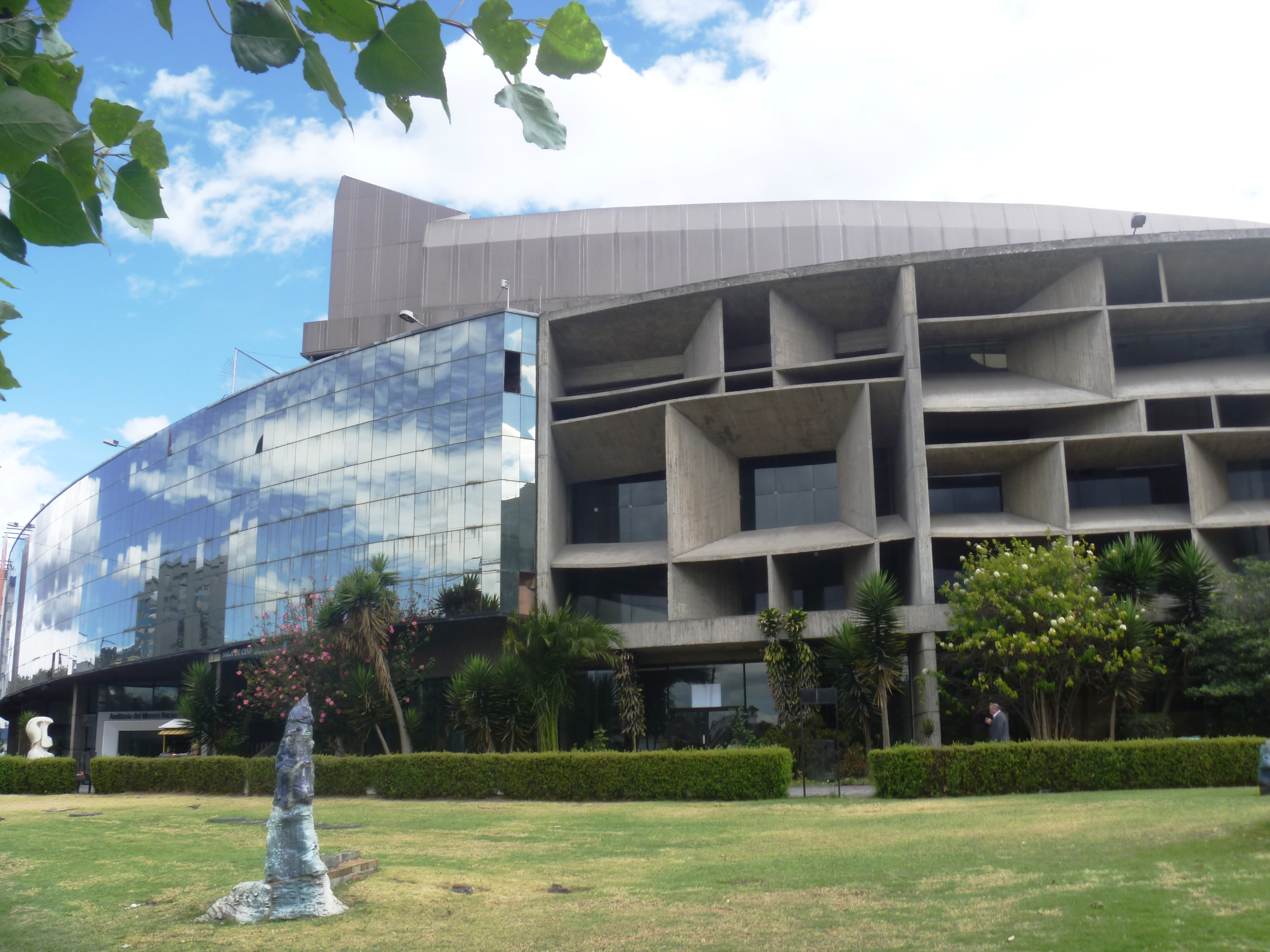
- La Casa de la Cultura Ecuatoriana headquarters in Quito
- Key people: Fernando Cerón (president)

Casa de la Cultura Ecuatoriana (House of Ecuadorian Culture) is a cultural organization founded by Benjamín Carrión on August 9, 1944, during the presidency of Dr Jose Maria Velasco Ibarra. It was created to stimulate, to direct and to coordinate the development of an authentic national culture. Headquartered in Quito, it maintains several museums throughout Ecuador.

The building is home to the National Museum of Ecuador (MuNa). Romina Muñoz led that museum for two years until she pointed out that MuNa did not have its own building and that ended her job. The existing museum is run by the Ministry of Culture, but the relationship was, in her opinion, confused and the existing location in the Casa de la Cultura Ecuatoriana was inappropriate for an enterprising national museum. She also complained that the museum's staff were not permanent employees. She said that she was sacked the next day. Muñoz became the Minister of Culture in 2023.
