= List of Ecuadorian poets =

This is a list of poets who were born in Ecuador or whose writings are closely associated with that country.

- Jorge Enrique Adoum
- Víctor Manuel Albornoz
- Alfonso Barrera Valverde
- Paco Benavides
- Carlos Benavides Vega
- Luz Elisa Borja
- Arturo Borja
- Jorge Carrera Andrade
- Fanny Carrión
- Iván Carvajal Aguirre
- Fernando Cazón Vera
- Luis Chiriboga Izquierdo
- Maritza Cino
- Octavio Cordero Palacios
- Luis Alberto Costales
- Remigio Crespo Toral
- Diógenes Cuero
- Benigna Dávalos Villavicencio
- César Dávila Andrade
- Jorge Dávila Vázquez
- Rafael Díaz Ycaza
- Miguel Donoso Pareja
- José María Egas
- Iván Égüez
- Gonzalo Escudero
- Aurelio Espinosa Pólit
- María Fernanda Espinosa
- Ulises Estrella
- Nelson Estupiñán Bass
- Luis Félix López
- Humberto Fierro
- Luis Enrique Fierro
- Kléber Franco Cruz
- Jaime Galarza Zavala
- Karina Gálvez
- Alfredo Gangotena
- Agustín García Banderas
- Mercedes González Tola
- Euler Granda
- Francisco Granizo
- Telmo Herrera
- Efraín Jara Idrovo
- Carlos Eduardo Jaramillo
- Ariruma Kowii
- Margarita Laso
- David Ledesma Vásquez
- Fanny León Cordero
- Violeta Luna
- Sonia Manzano
- Jorge Martillo
- Hugo Mayo
- Fernando Nieto Cadena
- Ernesto Noboa y Caamaño
- Iván Oñate
- Adalberto Ortiz
- Julio Pazos Barrera
- Raúl Pérez Torres
- Antonio Preciado
- Aleyda Quevedo
- Pedro Reino
- Ángel Vicente Ríos Maldonado
- Sergio Román Armendáriz
- Natasha Salguero
- Roy Sigüenza
- Medardo Ángel Silva
- Ricardo Torres Gavela
- Luis Francisco Urquizo Cuesta
- Jorge Velasco Mackenzie
- Pedro Jorge Vera
- Eduardo Villacís Meythaler
- Humberto Vinueza
- Alicia Yánez Cossío
- Luis Zúñiga
