= Tzantzismo =

Ecuadorian literary revolution

Tzantzismo was a cultural movement in the 1960s, Ecuador. It was founded in Quito in 1962 by Marco Muñoz and Ulises Estrella, and joined by other members throughout the 1960s. They were greatly influenced by other Ecuadorian intellectuals such as Jorge Enrique Adoum, César Dávila Andrade and Agustin Cueva. Tzantzismo was mainly expressed in poetry, and to a lesser extent in stories and theater. This literary revolutionary movement arose in response to a supposed degradation and gentrification in Ecuadorian literature.

Its members, called Tzántzicos, wore long, unkempt beards, as a symbolic tribute to Fidel Castro, and also grew their hair long and wore jeans. They began gathering at the home of the painter Eliza Aliz (birth name Elizabeth Rumazo) and her husband the Cuban painter Rene Aliz. Later the Tzántzicos would meet on Friday nights at the Café Aguila de Oro, which they renamed "77 Café", to have discussions on poetry, politics and other cultural matters.

In April 1962, Estrella and the Argentine poet Leandro Katz, an expert in printing processes, published four handmade poetry plaquettes with the work of Marco Muñoz “Infierno y sangre”, Simón Corral “Color de Vidrio”, Ulises Estrella “Clamor”, and Leandro Katz “Tzantzas - Un Día Para Evi”. Lacking colored paper for printing, they used red blotting paper, and folded each author's work into square, rhomboidal, and rectangular shapes, creating signed and numbered editions that marked the birth and inauguration of the Tzántzicos movement. The first Tzántzico Manifesto was signed on August 27, 1962, by Marco Muñoz, Alfonso Murriagui, Simón Corral, Teodoro Murillo, Euler Granda and Ulises Estrella.

Tzántzicos had a revolutionary attitude in their art as well as in politics. One of the main representatives of the movement is probably Raúl Arias, whose poetry collection Poesia en bicicleta is considered one of the best examples of Tzantzismo. The movement dissolved in 1969, particularly due to ideological differences between its founders. The term tzántzico comes from the Shuar language: “maker of tzantzas”, which means to cut off and shrink an enemy's head and show it off as a sign of victory and power.

== List of notable Tzántzicos ==
- Abdón Ubidia
- Agustín Cueva
- Alejandro Moreano
- Alfonso Murriágui (1929)
- Álvaro Juan Félix
- Antonio Ordóñez (1946)
- Bolívar Echeverría
- Euler Granda (1935)
- Fernando Tinajero
- Francisco Proaño Arandi
- Humberto Vinueza
- Iván Carvajal (1948)
- Iván egüez
- José Ron
- José Corral
- Leandro Katz
- Luis Corral
- Marco Muñoz
- Marco Velasco
- Rafael Larrea
- Raúl Arias
- Simón Corral (1946)
- Sonia Romo Verdesoto, the movement's only female member.
- Teodoro Murillo (1944)
- Ulises Estrella (1939)
