= Luz Elisa Borja Martínez =

Ecuadorian poet, pianist, painter and sculptor

Luz Elisa Borja
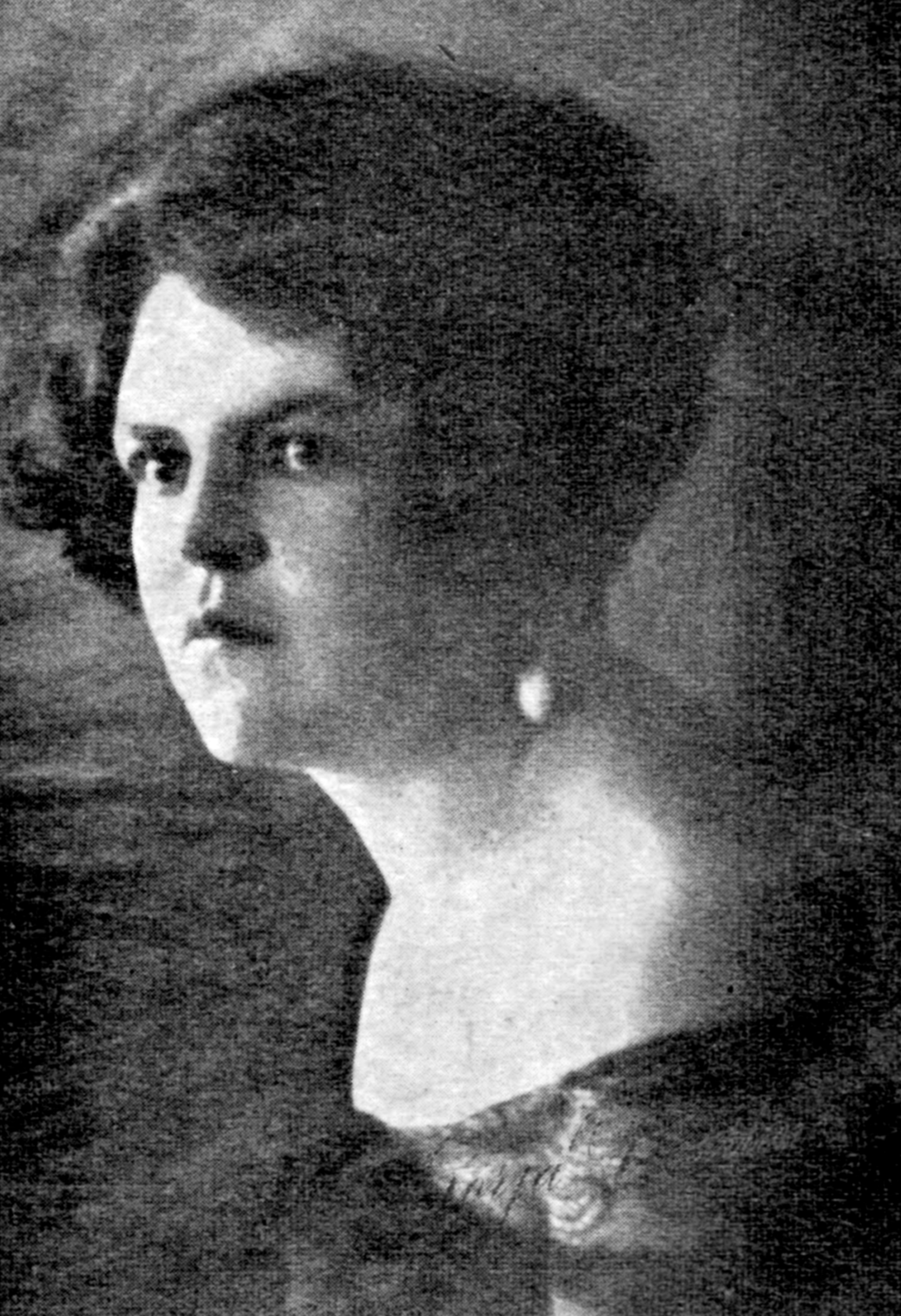
- Born: Luz Elisa Borja Martínez; 15 May 1903; Riobamba, Ecuador
- Died: 10 July 1927 (aged 24); Riobamba, Ecuador
- Occupations: Poet, pianist, painter, sculptor
- Writing career
- Notable works: Cofre Romántico; La Bella Durmiente
- Literary movement: Modernismo

Coat of arms of the Duke of Gandía of the House of Borgia or Borja

Luz Elisa Borja Martínez (15 May 1903 – 10 July 1927) was an Ecuadorian poet, pianist, painter, and sculptor.

== Biography ==
Borja Martínez was born in Riobamba in 1903, the daughter of Ricardo Borja León and Victoria Martínez Dávalos. Through her father, she was a direct descendant of Juan de Borja y Enríquez de Luna, the third Duke of Gandía, and Juana de Aragón y Gurrea. The former was the grandson of Pope Alexander VI and the latter was granddaughter of King Ferdinand II, descended from the rulers of Navarre and Aragon.

From a wealthy family, she was allowed the resources to develop her artistic talents. She was educated at the San Vicente de Paúl college in Riobamba, run by the Sisters of Charity.

As a multidisciplinary artist since childhood, Borja studied poetry, music, painting, and sculpture. Some of her original works are housed at the Casa de la Cultura in Chimborazo.

During her lifetime, she amassed an extensive body of written work that, after her death, her brother Luis Alberto published in two books named Cofre Romántico and La Bella Durmiente. The second includes the poem "Quiero Llorar" (I Mourn), which she wrote in 1918 at age 15, saddened by the death of the mother superior of the Sisters of Charity of Riobamba. It consists of seven stanzas, two of which went on to become the lyrics of the Ecuadorian pasillo known as "Lamparilla". Miguel Ángel Casares Viteri composed the music, inspired by the poem and dismayed by the damage caused by a flood of the Chanchán River.

She achieved success and awards in several Ecuadorian cities, and was cited by the foreign press at the time as one of that country's most illustrious poets. Ever since, she has been known as "La Alondra del Chimborazo" (The Lark of Chimborazo).

In Ecuador, she was influenced by the modernist literary movement known as the "generación decapitada", which included Medardo Ángel Silva, Arturo Borja (her second cousin), Ernesto Noboa y Caamaño, and Humberto Fierro. Internationally, she was influenced by the French authors Charles Baudelaire and Stéphane Mallarmé. In the field of music, she appreciated and exquisitely interpreted the works of Liszt, Schubert, and Beethoven.

She died in Riobamba on 10 July 1927, aged 24, and was buried in the cemetery of that city.

== Tributes ==
The Casa de la Cultura in Chimborazo created a library named for the poet, in a building ceded by the City Council of Riobamba on 21 April 1954. It had been willed by Borja's mother, with the provision that it be used as a library and cultural center.

In Borja's native Riobamba, there is a street bearing her name.

Considered a classic of its kind, the pasillo "Lamparilla" has been traditionally played by the most important singers and musical groups in Ecuador, as well as by prominent vocalists from other countries.
