= Ulises Estrella =

Ecuadorian poet

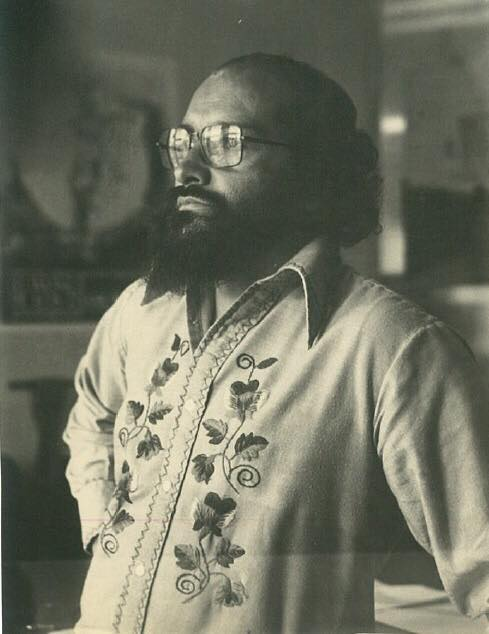
Ulises Estrella Moya

Ulises Estrella Moya (4 July 1939 – 27 December 2014) was an Ecuadorian poet and the co-founder of Tzantzismo, a literary movement of the 1960s, Ecuador. He was also a devoted film researcher and programmer, who headed the film cinematheque of the House of Ecuadorian Culture for over 30 years.

== Biography ==
His parents were Nicolás Estrella Maldonado from Tabacundo and Laura Moya Sánchez from Latacunga.

In the beginning of 1963 Estrella met the writer and educator Regina Katz. Together they traveled to Panama, and later to San Jose, Costa Rica where he taught a poetry course for three months to the children of the Castella Conservatory. They also went to Nicaragua, Honduras, Guatemala, and finally to Mexico, because in Argentina Regina had earned a scholarship to study dance at the Instituto Nacional de Bellas Artes. In Mexico he wrote for the poetry magazine El Corno emplumado, and was a literary critic for the newspapers Ovaciones and Excelsior. They then moved to New York for 9 months, where he spent a great deal of time watching movies by Italian neorealist directors such as Federico Fellini, Luchino Visconti, Michelangelo Antonioni, which sparked his interest in film. He then moved to Colombia, where he established a contact with the avant-garde literary group Nadaists led by Gonzalo Arango. By mid 1964 Estrella returned to Quito.

In 1965 he traveled to Trujillo, then to Lima, and lived in Cuzco for 2 months among poets and painters, arranging poetry readings and conferences. In 1966, he went to Buenos Aires, where he studied Art and Essay Films. He also reunited with Regina, who had returned to Argentina. In 1966 he and Regina returned to Quito where he presided over the Association of Young Artists and Writers.

In 1967 he represented Ecuador in the International Poets Conference celebrated in Varadero, Havana, called "Encuentro con Rubén Darío". In 1969–1970 he taught an Art History Course in Havana, and another course on Aesthetics at the National Art School of Cuba. That year he published a theater piece called "Apenas de este mundo", which was dialectical, folk, and political. Between 1971 and 1979 he founded the Film Department of the Central University, he also taught film journalism and image theory at the School of Information Science at the Central University.

Between 1974 and 1984 he directed the newspaper Prensa Obrera of the Federation of Workers of Pichincha. In 1975 he was elected vice president of the Federation of Employees and Workers of the Central University, and Permanent Secretary of the National Federation of Employees and Workers of Ecuador (CTE).

== Tzantzismo ==
In 1962, Estrella together with the Argentine poet Leandro Katz produced the first poetry plaquelet titled "Clamor", a series that was joined by the original members of the Tzántzicos group, Marcos Muñoz, Simón Corral and Leandro Katz. These platelets printed on red blotting paper and each folded in different geometric configurations were printed by the publishing press of the Central University of Ecuador, and marked the birth of Tzantzism. Its members, called Tzántzicos, wore long hair, dressed in bohemian aspects, and began to meet at the house of the painter Eliza Aliz (birth name Elizabeth Rumazo) and her husband, the Cuban painter René Aliz, who frequently welcomed them in your home. There they began to plan poetry readings in dramatized presentations, and on 26 April 1962, after a period of rehearsals, the four Tzántzicos of the inaugural group Marco Muños, Ulises Estrella, Leandro Katz and Simón Corral presented the original and now mythological show of poetry Four Screams in the Dark in the Benjamín Carrión Auditorium of the House of Culture of Quito, which created a climate of rebellion and irreverence towards the literary forms that dominated the national culture. They had the support and encouragement of important writers such as Jorge Enrique Adoum and painters such as Osvaldo Viteri, and began the inclusion of new members and voices of avant-garde poets and writers. With the help of the poet Euler Granda they started a radio program for reading choral poems and short radio plays called Ojo del pozo (Eye of the Well) whose recordings still exist. Later, the Tzántzicos would meet on Friday nights at the Águila de Oro Café, which they renamed "77 Café", to discuss poetry, politics, and other cultural topics.The first Tzántzico Manifesto was signed on 27 August 1962 by Marco Muñoz, Alfonso Murriagui, Simón Corral, Teodoro Murillo, Euler Granda and Ulises Estrella.

== Film ==
Between 1967 and 1970 he was the founding director of the University Film Club. He also taught literature at the Theater School of the House of Ecuadorian Culture, and the Favio Paccioni Art Center at the Central University of Ecuador.

In 1976 he produced the black and white movie Fuera de Aquí with the Kamán group of Bolivia, directed by Jorge Sanginés. The film received a prize at the Tashkent Festival, in the Uzbekistan Republic, in the Soviet Union. Then in 1980 he again joined the House of Ecuadorian Culture and founded its Film section. He also produced a documentary titled "Cartas al Ecuador" based on a book by Benjamín Carrión.

With the help of UNESCO he was able to carry out a project called Rescue and Salvage of Ecuadorian moving images. Among the recuperated material there are 95 Ecuadorian movies with a total of 42 hours and twenty minutes of film in 9.5 mm, which was transferred to 35 mm thanks to the collaboration of the Cinemateca Brasileña, to avoid its destruction. The majority of the movies were documentaries, and the rest fiction. Some were filmed between 1929 and 1959, and the majority after 1960.

In 1990 he was elected President of the Association of Employees and Workers of the House of Ecuadorian Culture, and began to write film criticism for the newspaper Hoy. Estrella was the head of the Cultural Film Club (1964), University (1967–1970) and city of Quito, (1979). He created the Film Department at the Central University (1971), the Cinemateca (1982), focusing on three aspects archiving, diffusion, and education, and which now bears the name of the Ulises Estrella National Cinematheque of Ecuador.

== Personal life ==
In 1963 Ulises Estrella met Regina Katz. In 1969 they had a daughter named Isadora Estrella Katz. From 1980 until 1984 he lived with the film director Mónica Vásquez Baquero. He died on 27 December 2014.

== Poetry books ==
- Clamor (1962) from a series together with poems by Simón Corral, Leandro Katz, and Marcos Muñoz.
- Ombligo del Mundo (1966)
- Apenas de este mundo (1967)
- Convulsionario (1974)
- Aguja que rompe el tiempo (1980)
- Fuera del Juego (1983) winner of the Jorge Carrera Andrade Award, Quito
- Sesenta Poemas (1984)
- Interiores (1986)
- Cuando el sol se mira de frente (1989)
