= Siomara España =

Ecuadorian poet, essayist, professor and literary critic

Siomara España Muñoz (born January 4, 1976) is an Ecuadorian poet, essayist, professor and literary critic. She is director of the area of Literature of the House of Culture Núcleo del Guayas.

== Trajectory ==
She is the author of six books and other works, with a critical and essay style within Ecuadorian literature. She has also collected poems from her previous publications in an anthology in which she has added some unpublished verses.

In 2016, España participated in the thirteenth edition of the prestigious Cosmopoética festival held in Córdoba (Spain) along with 130 other poets from all over the world. Two years later, in 2018, as part of the Safi Festival in Morocco of literature, a tribute was paid to España, who was attending as a guest.

== Academic Work ==
Siomara Spain has carried out academic works such as essays based on books which will be detailed in the next lines: Essay: "Servio Zapata, "De lo espiritual en el arte" a la poética de Kandinsky", Book published by Poligráfica, February 2017. Essay: "Un hombre muerto a puntapiés, poética de un relato policial", Book from the 3rd Simposio Nacional de Literatura Ecuatoriana Pablo, Casa de la Cultura Ecuatoriana "Benjamín Carrión" Núcleo de Loja, 2016/11 Essay: "Medardo Ángel Silva, En la antesala de una generación decapitada", Conference given at the Havana Book Fair, Cuba 2015 and publication at Revista de la Facultad de Filosofía de la Universidad de Guayaquil, 04/01/2015.

== Career path ==
Siomara works as a teacher at Autonomous University of Madrid (UAM), and also has a PhD in artistic literary and cultural studies from the same university.

== Academic world ==
Siomara España created academic works, essays and the best known are:

- Ensayo: "Servio Zapata, "De lo espiritual en el arte" a la poética de Kandinsky", Libro publicado por Poligráfica, febrero de 2017
- Ensayo: "Un hombre muerto a puntapiés, poética de un relato policial", Libro del III Simposio Nacional de Literatura Ecuatoriana Pablo, Casa de la Cultura Ecuatoriana "Benjamín Carrión" Núcleo de Loja, 2016/11
- Ensayo: "Medardo Ángel Silva, En la antesala de una generación decapitada", Conferencia dada en la Feria del libro de la Habana, Cuba 2015 y publicación Revista de la Facultad de Filosofía de la Universidad de Guayaquil, 04/01/2015
- Ensayo: "La nocturna seducción de Tánatos y Eros", Estudio del libro Je Suis Malade de la poeta de Dina Belrham, El quirófano ediciones 08/2012
- Ensayo: "El Realismo progresista de Pablo Palacio", Conferencia dictada en el Centro Cultural Duce María Loynaz, La Habana Cuba 19/04/ 2012
- Ensayo: ‘Más allá de las palabras’, sobre el libro: Amanece Luz, de Mario Z. Puglisi, Editorial El Taller del Poeta, España, 2011
- Ensayo: ‘Dedicadencias’, sobre el libro de Ernesto Intriago, Colección literaria Almuerzo Desnudo #17, Editorial Mar Abierto, Manta, Ecuador, 2011
- Ensayo: ‘Cuando el helio se torna poesía’, sobre el libro: ‘La mujer de helio’ de Dina Bellrham, Editorial El Quirófano, 2011
- Ensayo: ‘Gritos de Verano’, sobre el libro: ‘Summer Screams, de Francisco León Carrasco, Hipocampo editores, Perú, 2009
- Ensayo: "El soneto desde Petrarca a nuestros días", Artículo publicado en la revista Antropofagia, Revista de reflexión y creación artística y cultural, 2008/05

== Works ==
Siomara was recognized for her works and love of her career. Many of her works were translated to different languages such as English, French and Japanese. She is the author of several poetry books.

- 2007 – Concupiscencia. Poemario. Editorial El Ángel, Quito.
- 2008 – Alivio demente. Poemario. Editorial Alpamanda, Quito.
- 2010 – De cara al fuego. Poemario. Editorial El Ángel, Quito.
- 2013 – Jardines en el aire. Editorial Mar Abierto, Manta.
- 2016 – Construcción de los sombreros encarnados / Música para una muerte inversa. Poemario, Editorial Polibea, Madrid.
- 2017 – De otros cielos y una luz al alba. Editorial La Chifurnia, El Salvador-Puerto Rico.
- 2018 – Celebración de la memoria. Huerga y Fierro

== Research trajectory ==
Doctoral thesis on: The anthropological universe in the work of Pablo Palacio: a biocritical and psychocritical analysis from the Poetics of the imaginary.

The Canon: Writers and lives inside and outside the canon
