= Jorge Carrera Andrade Award =

- Named for Jorge Carrera Andrade
- Awarded for: Poetry
- Sponsored by: Municipality of Quito
- Country: Ecuador
- First award: 1983

The Jorge Carrera Andrade Award (Spanish: Premio Jorge Carrera Andrade) is a literary award given by the Municipality of Quito, Ecuador to the best poetry book published during the year. It is awarded simultaneously with the Joaquín Gallegos Lara National Fiction Prize, on 1 December of each year. This happens in commemoration of the Day of Quito Interculturality, which takes place as part of the city's founding celebrations.

The winners receive a statuette called "Rumiñahui de Oro" (Golden Rumiñawi).

== List of winners ==
- 1983 – Fuera de juego by Ulises Estrella
- 1988 – Anotaciones del acabóse by Euler Granda and Mujeres by Julio Pazos Barrera
- 1989 – Los des(en)tierros del caminante by Fernando Nieto Cadena
- 1991 – Alias Lumbre de Acertijo by Humberto Vinueza
- 1992 – Tréboles marcados by Catalina Sojos
- 1994 – Las puertas de la hierba by Violeta Luna
- 1996 – Algunas rosas verdes by Aleyda Quevedo
- 1997 – El trazo de las cobras by Margarita Laso
- 1998 – La piel del tiempo by Alexis Naranjo
- 1999 – Catholic Splendor by César Molina
- 2000 – Antología personal by Sara Vanegas Coveña
- 2002 – Adagio en G mayor by Miguel Donoso Pareja
- 2003 – Escribe la inicial de tu nombre en el umbral del sueño by Bruno Sáenz
- 2004 – Al andar by Sara Vanegas Coveña
- 2006 – Tiniebla de esplendor by Luis Carlos Mussó
- 2007 – Constelación del instinto by Humberto Vinueza
- 2008 – La muerte de Caín by Ernesto Carrión
- 2009 – Obra poética completa 1968-2008 by Sheyla Bravo
- 2010 – Almohada sin huellas by Desiree Marín Sevilla
- 2011 – Confesiones apocalípticas by Jennie Carrasco
- 2012 – No es dicha by Juan Secaira
- 2013 – Viaje de gorilas by Ernesto Carrión
- 2014 – Mea Vulgatea by Luis Carlos Mussó
- 2015 – Rebeliones al filo de una sinfonía by Freddy Ayala
- 2016 – No mueras joven, todavía queda gente por decepcionar by Andrés Villalba Becdach
- 2017 – Pájaro de nunca volver by Mario Campaña
- 2018 – Cuaderno de Yorkshire by Juan José Rodinás
- 2019 – Oscuridad arriba by Antonio Correa Losada
- 2021 – Tengo hambre de tu boca by Yana Lema
- 2022 – Acta de fundación by Víctor Vimos
- 2023 – Acantile duerme piloto by María Auxiliadora Balladares

== See also ==
- Joaquín Gallegos Lara National Fiction Prize
