= Verdesoto =

Verdesoto is a surname. Notable people with the surname include:

- Raquel Verdesoto (1910–1999), Ecuadorian writer
- Sonia Romo Verdesoto, Ecuadorian poet
