= Vinueza =

Vinueza is a surname. Notable people with the surname include:

- Humberto Vinueza (1942–2017), Ecuadorian poet
- Rosana Vinueza (1949–2009), Ecuadorian beauty queen
- Leopoldo Benites Vinueza
