= Aurora Estrada y Ayala =

Ecuadorian poet, columnist, narrator, educator and politician

- Born: November 17, 1901; Puebloviejo
- Died: March 12, 1967 (aged 65); Guayaquil
- Education: Colegio Nacional Vicente Rocafuerte
- Occupations: poet, writer
- Known for: poetry
- Spouse: Gustavo Ramirez Perez
- Children: five

Aurora Estrada y Ayala (November 17, 1901 – March 12, 1967) was an Ecuadorian poet, columnist, narrator, educator, politician.

== Life ==
Ayala was born in San Juan Parish in Pueblo Viejo in 1901. Her parents were Rodolfo Estrada Ampuero and Natalia Ayala. They lived in a large house and her parents were rich and intellectual. Her father's brother had an extensive library and there and at school she took an interest in literature. In 1912 her family moved to Guayaquil which was the city where her parents came from. There she continued her education at the Colegio Nacional Vicente Rocafuerte. Her first published poems appeared in 1920 in a magazine named, "Los Hermes".

She created the literary magazine, "Proteo"; in 1922. The magazine published new writing and information. Contributors to her magazine included Jorge Carrera Andrade and Gabriela Mistral. In 1923 her work was recognised when it took the first two places in "La Fiesta de la Raza" organised by Quito Universities with her poems "Cuando Vuelva a Mí" and "Poema de the House in Ruins”.

In 1925 she published "Como el Incienso".

Her writing was published in "Orientación" which was published in Argentina. Her poetry described the problems of women in Ecuador. Notable works include: "Hymn to the Province of Los Ríos", "Hymn to the Aguirre Abad School" and "Song of the Workers".

In 1955 she was chosen to be among a group of Latin American women who visited Russia.

In 1964 she obtained the recognition La Lira Poética " María Piedad Castillo de Levi " from the Association of Journalists.

She was involved with the Central Women's Committee "Zoila Ugarte de Landívar" and she was a candidate in Guayas to be their deputy at the National Assembly.

Ayala died in the city of Guayaquil on 12 March 1967.

== Private life ==
She was married to a lawyer named Gustavo Ramirez Perez and they had five children.
