= Muna Lee (writer) =

American writer, activist, and suffragist in Puerto Rico

- Born: January 29, 1895; Raymond, Mississippi, United States
- Died: April 3, 1965 (aged 70); San Juan, Puerto Rico
- Occupations: Poet; translator; activist
- Spouse: Luis Muñoz Marín
- Writing career
- Genres: Pan-Americanism, Feminism, Detective fiction

Muna Lee (January 29, 1895 – April 3, 1965) was an American poet, author, and activist, who first became known and widely published as a lyric poet in the early 20th century. She also was known for her writings that promoted Pan-Americanism and feminism. She translated and published in Poetry a 1925 landmark anthology of Latin American poets, and continued to translate from poetry in Spanish.

A long-term resident of Puerto Rico from 1920 to her death 45 years later, she was an activist in the 1920s and 1930s, working on issues of women's suffrage and equal rights in Puerto Rico and Latin America. Lee worked for more than two decades in cultural affairs for the United States State Department, promoting artistic and literature exchanges between Latin America and the US, as well as other countries.

== Biography ==
Born in Raymond, Mississippi in 1895, the eldest of nine children, Lee was the daughter of Benjamin Floyd Lee, "a self-taught druggist" and son of a planter, and Mary Maud (McWilliams) Lee, whose father was a physician. Three of her siblings died in infancy. Her parents encouraged her early interest in literature and art. When Muna was seven her family moved to Hugo, Oklahoma, where her father set up his store. It was in the heart of "Indian country", at a time when many whites were moving to Oklahoma.

Lee returned to Mississippi at age 14 to attend Blue Mountain College (then scaled like a prep school). After a year and summer study at the University of Oklahoma, she went on to the University of Mississippi, where she graduated in 1913 at the age of eighteen. Lee published her first poem soon after.

After college, she started working as a teacher in Oklahoma, then in Texas. By fall of 1916, she was teaching in Tonkawa, Oklahoma, at a new junior college, University Preparatory School (now Northern Oklahoma College). Through all these moves and her teaching, she kept writing and submitting poems to magazines. In 1916, she succeeded in getting several poems published in national literary magazines: Poetry: A Magazine of Verse, Smart Set, Contemporary Verse, and Others: A Magazine of the New Verse. Three of these were new magazines devoted to contemporary poetry. Her year of publication was crowned in September by her winning the first Lyric Prize of Poetry magazine.

Lee taught herself Spanish and got a job with the United States Secret Service in New York City, where she worked as a translator during World War I. She translated confidential letters from Spanish, Portuguese and French. By this time she had already published two dozen poems in Smart Set, and was its second-most frequent contributor.

In New York, she quickly learned about the Pan American movements and began to explore Latin American literature. In 1918 she had poems published in Pan American Poetry and Pan-American Magazine. All were translated by Nicaraguan poet Salomón de la Selva, who was editor-in-chief of the poetry magazine).

== Marriage and family ==
It was through her poetry being translated into Spanish and published in the Pan American magazines that she met her future husband Luis Muñoz Marín, a Puerto Rican poet and journalist. He had started a new bilingual magazine "devoted to Pan-American culture," called Revista de Indias (Indies Review), and wanted to publish her work. The magazine soon folded but was a sign of the artistic ferment in the city.

They became passionately involved and were married on July 1, 1919. The couple moved to Puerto Rico in 1920, but divided their time between New York and Puerto Rico for years. Soon they had two children together: daughter Muna Muñoz Lee (known as Munita) and son Luis Muñoz Lee (known as Luisito). They were often separated; Muñoz Marín lived in Greenwich Village for extended periods, due to his dependence on opium, in the 1920s as he continued to work at poetry.

They were legally separated by 1938 and officially divorced on November 15, 1946. In 1948, Muñoz Marín became the first democratically elected Governor of Puerto Rico.

== To Puerto Rico and back ==
Lee became a longterm resident of Puerto Rico in 1920 when moving there with her husband, Muñoz Marín. By 1923 they had returned to the New York area, and his mother lived with them at their house in Teaneck, New Jersey. Muñoz Marín also returned to Puerto Rico, working more in politics. Lee stayed in New Jersey because of their young children.

In 1920 Lee published her first poems in translation from Spanish, in Thomas Walsh's Hispanic Anthology. She became immersed in Latin American poetry and began to work on a project of an anthology of poets in Spanish. This was published in June 1925, in a special issue of Poetry magazine. She had selected and translated 31 poets from Latin America. This was a "landmark publication, among the first of its kind in the history of twentieth-century literary magazines." The year before, Lee's essay, "Contemporary Spanish-American Poetry," was published in North American Review, reviewing major trends in Pan American literature.

She became an advocate for and translator of Latin American literature, making major contributions to the modern Pan-American literary tradition. She wrote about translating from Spanish, that the poetry "is only partially translatable — that is, so much of its beauty depends upon the intricately braided jet and silver of its cadences that a great deal is necessarily lost by translation into a less liquid tongue."

After Lee and all the family returned to Puerto Rico in 1926, they lived in San Juan. Muñoz Marín took over La Democracia, a newspaper started by his father, and got more involved in politics. In 1927 Lee started working for the University of Puerto Rico as director of International Relations, where she served for nearly a decade. She was the university's chief publicist and established relationships with other academic institutions and governments. She and her husband were more financially secure, for the first time in years. But later that year, Muñoz Marín returned to New York, remaining there for most of three years.

=== Political activism ===
Lee became involved in feminist activism, making important contributions to the modern women's movement, in particular the struggle for equal rights. She was a founder of the Inter-American Commission of Women, for which she worked in Washington, DC, in the summers of 1928 and 1929. She helped represent Puerto Rico and joined with women of Latin America at the Sixth Pan American Congress in 1928 in Havana. They advocated for women's equal rights and suffrage (the latter passed in Puerto Rico in 1929, restricted to literate women, and then universal suffrage was passed in 1935.)

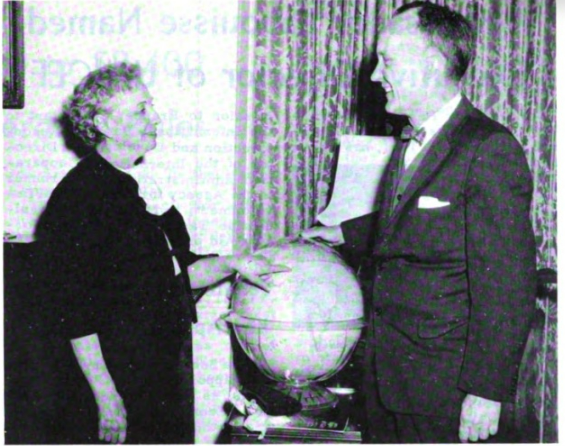
Muna Lee with then Under Secretary for Economic Affairs, Thomas C. Mann, at her retirement from the State Department

In 1930 Lee returned with her children to Washington, DC, on leave of absence from the university. She was director of national activities from 1930 through 1931 for the National Woman's Party where she worked to promote the Equal Rights Amendment. She frequently traveled across the US in representing it, and worked against discrimination against women in employment, including restrictions on certain kinds of work. The Great Depression was causing suffering for working people.

Her work in poetry continued, as she published her own work in American literary magazines. In addition, she translated poems by Latin American writers. She produced 37 translations of poems by twenty writers for the groundbreaking book, Anthology of Contemporary Latin-American Poetry (1941), published by New Directions.

In a separate endeavor, from 1934 to 1938, Lee wrote five detective novels under the pen name Newton Gayle (co-authored with Maurice Guinness, an American Shell Oil executive in Puerto Rico). The books were published in the United States and the United Kingdom, and well received at the time, particularly for their use of bilingual dialogue in English and Spanish. They have been translated into French and Italian.

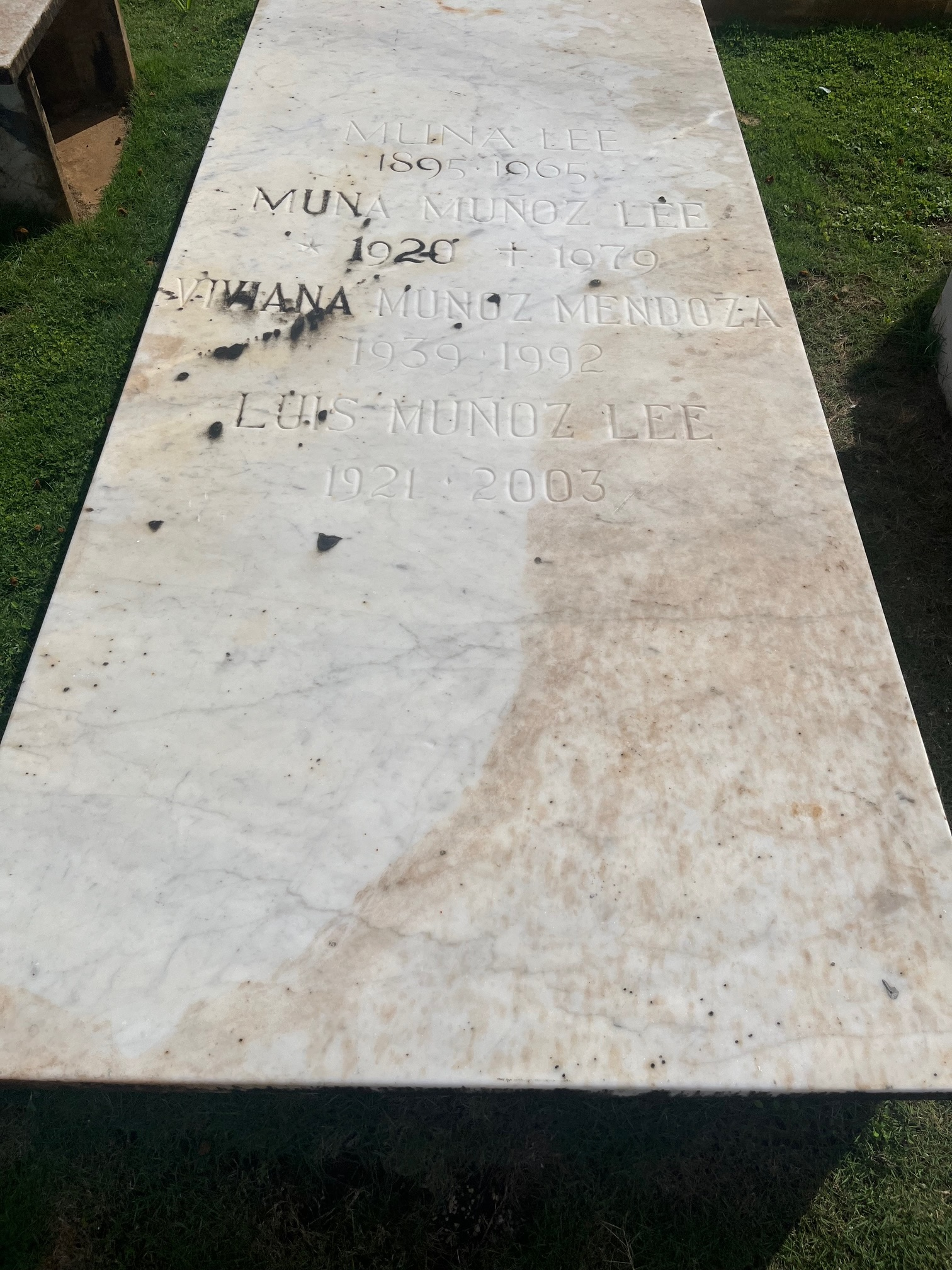
Gravesite of Muna Lee in Old San Juan, Puerto Rico

== State Department ==
In 1941, Lee joined the U.S. State Department in Washington, DC, as an inter-American cultural affairs specialist. She arranged "exchanges of literature, art, and film with Latin American nations," which kept her involved in the arts for the rest of her life. She also continued to write poetry. Lee won the Department's Meritorious Service Award in 1952 and the Superior Service Award in 1963.

She worked with the State Department until 1965, retiring two months before her death from lung cancer on April 3, 1965, in San Juan. She was buried at Santa María Magdalena de Pazzis Cemetery in Old San Juan. She had long worked for her vision of "our achieving what she called Pan-American character, a multicultural American ethos composed of 'aboriginal copper, carbon of Ethiopia, Latin dream, and stark Anglo-Saxon reality'."

== Mystery series ==
The books were published in the US by Scribner's and Sons, and in Britain by Gollancz.

- Death Follows a Formula (1935)
- The Sentry-Box Murder’’ (US, 1935); and as “Murder in the Sentry-Box (UK, 1935)
- Murder at 28:10 (1936)
- Death in the Glass (1937)
- Sinister Crag (1938)

== Poetry ==
- Sea-Change (1923)
- Among 16 translators of works in Anthology of Contemporary Latin-American Poetry (1941)
- Secret Country translated from the Spanish of Jorge Carrera Andrade (1946)

== See also ==
- List of Puerto Rican writers
- List of Puerto Ricans
- Puerto Rican literature
