= Abdón Ubidia =

Ecuadorian writer (born 1944)

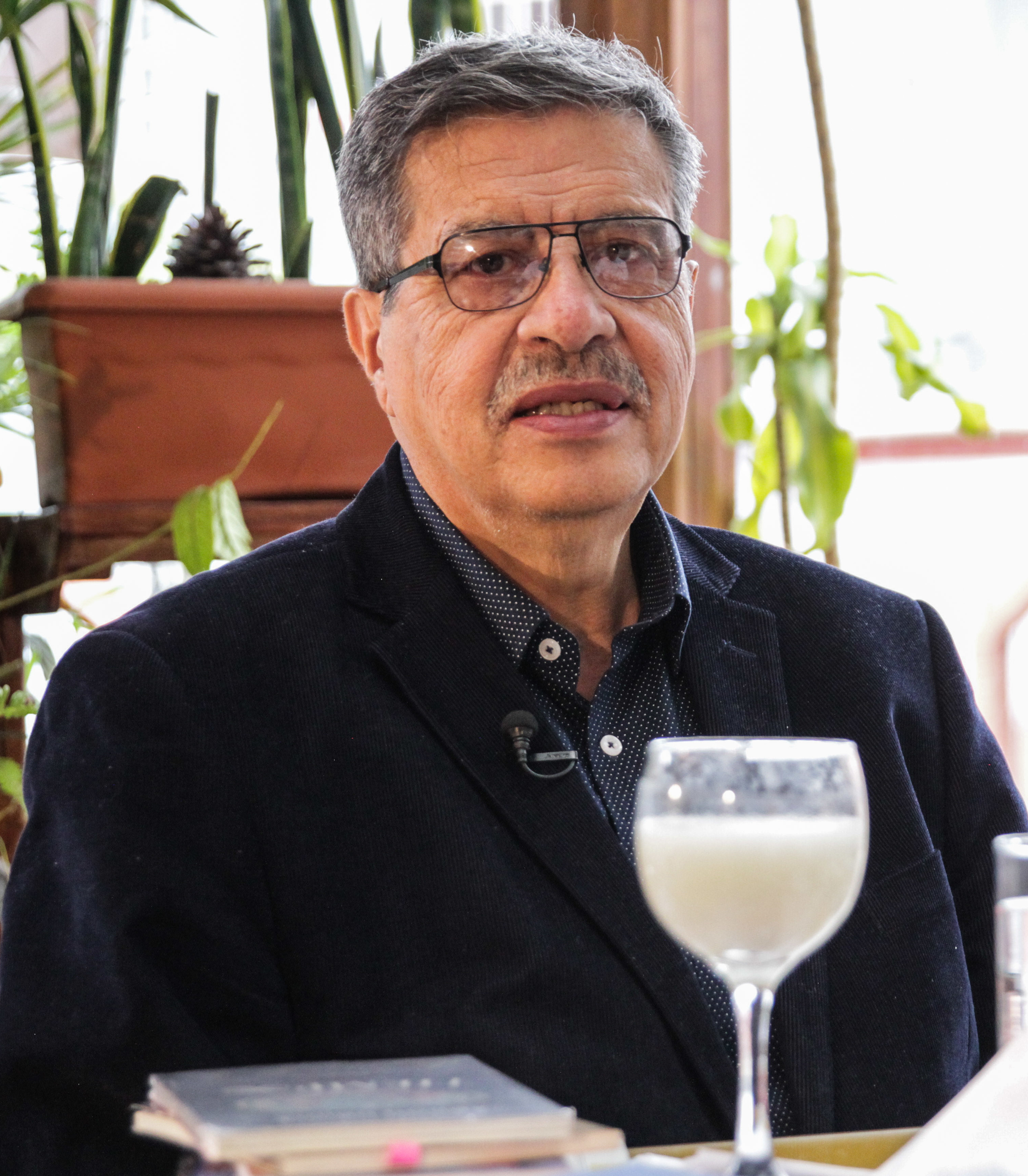
- Born: 1944 (age 81–82); Quito, Ecuador
- Occupation: Writer
- Writing career
- Notable awards: Premio Eugenio Espejo (2012), Jose Mejia prize for best fiction (1979) and (1986).
- Literary movement: Tsantzismo

Abdón Ubidia (born 1944) is an Ecuadorian writer who is considered one of the most representative and relevant voices of modern Ecuadorian literature. He was the 2012 recipient of the Premio Eugenio Espejo in Literature, awarded to him by President Rafael Correa.

His is the author of the short story books Bajo el mismo extraño cielo (1979), Divertinventos (1989) and the novels Ciudad de invierno (1984) and Sueño de lobos (1986), which was translated into English as Wolves' Dream in 1997.

As a researcher in the field of oral literature, he published El cuento popular (1997) and La poesía popular (1982). He has contributed to numerous cultural publications, led the cultural magazine Palabra suelta, and has carried out field research as compiler of legends and oral traditions. His stories have been translated into several European languages.

== Books ==
Novels:

- Ciudad de invierno (Quito, 1984). English translation, City in Winter, by Nathan D. Horowitz, 2018, Editorial El Conejo, Quito.
- Sueño de lobos (Quito, 1986), Jose Mejia prize for best fiction. English translation, Wolves' Dream by Mary E. Fieweger, 1997, Latin American Literary Review Press, Pittsburgh.
- La madriguera (Quito, 2004).
- Callada como la muerte (Quito, 2012).

Short stories:

- Bajo el mismo extraño cielo (Bogotá, 1979), Jose Mejia prize for best fiction.
- Divertinventos (Quito, 1989). English translation, Funventions: A Book of Fantasies and Utopias, by Nathan D. Horowitz, 2020, Editorial El Conejo, Quito
- El palacio de los espejos (Quito, 1996).
- Tiempo (Quito, 2015), Joaquín Gallegos Lara prize for short fiction. English translation, Time: Philosophical and Scientific Fictions, by Nathan D. Horowitz, 2018, Editorial El Conejo, Quito

Theater:

- Adiós siglo XX (Quito, 1992).
- Essays: El cuento popular (Quito, 1977).
- La poesía popular ecuatoriana (Quito, 1982).
- Referentes (Quito, 2000).

Anthologies:

- Cuento ecuatoriano contemporáneo (Guayaquil, s.f).
- Nuevos cuentistas del Ecuador (Guayaquil, 1975).
- Así en la tierra como en los sueños (Quito, 1991).
- Cuentos hispanoamericanos, Ecuador (1992).
- Cuento contigo (Guayaquil, 1993).
- Diez cuentistas ecuatorianos (Quito, 1993).
- Doce cuentistas ecuatorianos (Quito, 1995).
- Veintiún cuentistas ecuatorianos (Quito, 1996).
- Antología básica del cuento ecuatoriano (Quito, 1998).
- Cuento ecuatoriano de finales del siglo XX (Quito, 1999).
- Cuento ecuatoriano contemporáneo (México, 2001).
