= Aleyda Quevedo =

Ecuadorian writer

Aleyda Quevedo Rojas
- Born: 1972 (age 53–54); Quito
- Occupation: Writer
- Awards: Jorge Carrera Andrade Award (1996)

Aleyda Quevedo Rojas (born 1972, Quito) is an Ecuadorian poet and journalist. She is considered one of the most relevant voices in contemporary Latin American poetry.

Among her best-known works are the poems Algunas rosas verdes (1996), for which she won the Jorge Carrera Andrade Award of that year, and Soy mi cuerpo (2006), in which she uses the human figure as an escape from the fears and anguish provoked by death. In 2017, the House of Ecuadorian Culture published the book Cierta manera de la luz sobre el cuerpo, a compilation of Quevedo's poems to that point. Writer Jesús David Curbelo described Quevedo's work as the "witness of a life and a supplier of feelings in which she scrutinizes first the body, then emotions, then finally the mind."

In July 2018, Quevedo attended a colloquium commemorating Jorge Carrera Andrade with writers César Eduardo Carrión, Javier Cevallos Perugachi, José Gregorio Vásquez, Jesús David Curbelo, and Mario Pera.

== Works ==
- Cambio en los climas del corazón (1989)
- La actitud del fuego (1994)
- Algunas rosas verdes (1996)
- Espacio vacío (2001)
- Soy mi cuerpo (2006)
- Dos encendidos, Manuela y Bolívar (2010)
- Cierta manera de la luz sobre el cuerpo (2017)
