= Fernando Tinajero =

Ecuadorian writer (born 1940)

Fernando Tinajero Vallamar
- Born: January 5, 1940 (age 86); Quito, Ecuador
- Citizenship: Ecuador
- Occupation: Writer
- Writing career
- Notable awards: Premio Eugenio Espejo (2015)
- Literary movement: Tsantzismo

Fernando Tinajero Villamar (born 1940, Quito) is an Ecuadorian novelist, essayist, and university professor. In the 1960s, he was one of the most active members of Tzantzismo a cultural vanguard movement which had roots in the Cuban revolution. He was the 2015 recipient of the Eugenio Espejo Prize in literature awarded by the Ecuadorian president.

== Works ==
- "Más allá de los dogmas" (1967) with foreword by Benjamín Carrión
- "El desencuentro"
- "Aproximaciones y distancias: ensayos"
- "Teoría de la cultura nacional"
- "De la evasión al desencanto"
