= Pueblo Viejo Canton =

Coordinates: 1°33′00″S 79°32′02″W

Puebloviejo Canton
- Canton
- Location of Los Rios Province in Ecuador.

- Puebloviejo Canton in Los Ríos Province
- Country: Ecuador
- Province: Los Ríos Province
- Capital: Puebloviejo

Area
  - Total: 129.8 sq mi (336.3 km^{2})

Population (2001)
  - Total: 29,420
- Time zone: UTC-5 (ECT)

Puebloviejo Canton is a canton of Ecuador, located in the Los Ríos Province. Its capital is the town of Puebloviejo. Its population at the 2001 census was 29,420.

== Demographics ==
Ethnic groups as of the Ecuadorian census of 2010:

- Montubio 51.9%
- Mestizo 37.8%
- Afro-Ecuadorian 5.6%
- White 2.7%
- Indigenous 1.9%
- Other 0.2%

== Geography and climate ==
It is located in the center of the province of Los Ríos. It covers an area of 336.3 square kilometres.

The Rio Puebloviejo flows through the village, with a series of tributaries that feed it and many estuaries and streams. The weather is warm and humid with temperatures varying between 27 and 28 degrees Celsius.

== History ==
Puebloviejo is mentioned in early chronicles in 1616, mentioning the fork in the river. In 1693, in the period of King Charles II of Spain, Puebloviejo was part of the Territory of Guayaquil.

In 1808, Puebloviejo became one of the 14 districts of the Province of Guayaquil. On October 9, 1820, Guayaquil proclaimed their independence from Spanish rule, causing Puebloviejo to proclaim its independence on 12 October, recognized as independence day in the canton.

During the presidency of Vicente Ramón Roca, by legislative decree on February 7 of 1846, it became a canton. During the months of February and March 2008, San Francisco de Puebloviejo suffered from severe flooding in Ecuador, which affected not only crops but also houses and many families in the area.

== Economy ==
Many of the inhabitants are employed in agriculture. Besides being the largest producer of bananas within the Province, the canton has produced cocoa since colonial times. It also produces tagua, fine woods, tropical fruits, coffee, rice, corn, soybean, passion fruit, tomato and others.

== Notable people ==
The poet Aurora Estrada y Ayala was born here in 1903 and spent her early childhood in Pueblo Viejo.
