= Jorge Elías Adoum =

Jorge Elías Francisco Adoum a.k.a. Mago Jefa (March 10, 1897 – May 4, 1958) was born in the Ottoman Empire and migrated to Ecuador where he translated many works from Arabic to Spanish. He also painted, sculpted, composed music, practiced natural medicine and wrote more than forty volumes on occult sciences and Freemasonry which he signed with his pen name "Mago Jefa". He ran a private practice that specialized in hypnotism, magnetism and suggestion. He is reported to have performed numerous healings considered miraculous in his time. After 1945 he traveled to Chile, Argentina, and Brazil. He died in Rio de Janeiro in 1958 at sixty one years of age. He was the father of the Ecuadorian novelist Jorge Enrique Adoum.

== Translations into English ==
The only work of Adoum's available in English is Del sexo a la divinidad translated as Sex to Divinity by Monica Rocha. This work sets forth Dr. Adoum's ideas about the practice of sacred sexuality, expounds upon the origins of the founders of religions, lifts the veil on the allegory of Hiram Abif and acknowledges his debt to nineteenth century Masonic predecessors, particularly the Franco-Belgium Freemason Jean-Marie Ragon.

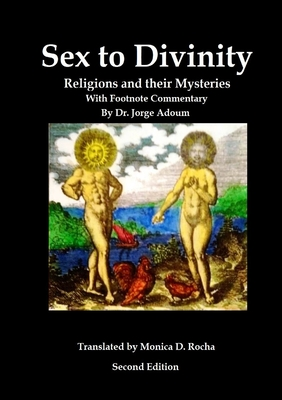
Translated into English by Monica Rocha
