= Paco Benavides =

Ecuadorian writer and painter (1964–2003)

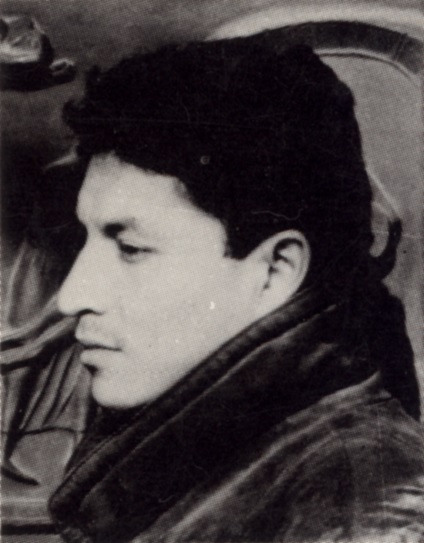
Paco Benavides

Paco Benavides (4 December 1964 – 24 June 2003) was an Ecuadorian writer and painter.

== Biography ==
Benavides was born in San Gabriel in Carchi Province, but when he was 2 years old, the family moved to Quito. He studied at the Borja Academy No. 3 and Central University of Ecuador, where he majored in sociology and political science.

At the end of the 1980s, he was a member of the Matapiojo group (alongside Diego Velasco, Edwin Madrid, Víctor Vallejo, Pablo Yépez Maldonado, Diego Gortaire, Susana Struve, etc.) Matapiojo's utopian proposal was to socialize the means of literary production. His first collection of poetry Historia Natural del Fuego came out in 1990. He married a Swiss woman called Franziska Berger and moved to Bern in 1993. In Switzerland, he became a Spanish language teacher, while continuing with his literary and artistic work.

In 1995, Casa de la Cultura Ecuatoriana published Viento Sur; this was followed by Tierra Adentro, which came out in 1997.

The marriage with Berger failed. He died alone at home in Bern in 2003, and was only found days later. His ashes were taken to Quito, where they now rest in Batán Cemetery.

More of his work has appeared since his death, for example, in the literary journal Renacimiento, edited by Fernando Iwasaki.

== Works ==
- Historia Natural del Fuego, Quito, 1990
- Viento Sur, Quito, Casa de la Cultura Ecuatoriana, 1995
- Tierra Adentro, Quito, 1997
- Vida y Milagros (unpublished)
