= Leandro Katz =

Argentine-born writer and filmmaker

Leandro Katz (born 1938) is an Argentine-born writer, visual artist and filmmaker known primarily for his films and photographic installations. His works include long-term, multi-media projects that delve into Latin American history through a combination of scholarly research, anthropology, photography, moving images and printed texts.

== Early life and career ==
He lived and worked in New York from 1965 to 2006, and currently lives in Buenos Aires. He has been a member of the faculty at the School of Visual Arts, Art History Program, Brown University, Semiotics Program, and a professor of film production and theory at the College of Arts and Communication at William Paterson University.

== Larger works ==
Katz's notable long-term works include The Catherwood Project, a photographic reconstruction of the two 1850s expeditions of John Lloyd Stephens and Frederick Catherwood to the Maya areas of Central America and Mexico, Project For The Day You'll Love Me, which investigates the events around the capture and execution of Che Guevara in Bolivia in 1967, Paradox which deals with Central American archaeology and the banana plantations of the United Fruit Company in Honduras and Guatemala, Vortex, which addresses the social and literary history of the rubber industry in the Amazon region of the Putumayo River based on a report by Roger Casement, and Tania, Masks and Trophies, a project that examines the figure of Tamara Bunke, the only woman who fought together with Che Guevara in his last campaign of 1967.

== Other works ==
Leandro Katz has produced many books and artists’ books and eighteen narrative and non-narrative films. His most recent books, Natural History, and The Ghosts of Ñancahuazú, were published in 2010. His artist's book dealing with matters of time and daily life, S(h)elf Portrait, was published in Buenos Aires in 2008. In 2019, he published Bedlam Days: The Early Plays of Charles Ludlam and The Ridiculous Theatrical Company with over 200 never-before-seen photographs of Ludlam's avant garde plays of the 60s and 70s, and with extended quotations from "Queer Theatre" by Stefan Brecht.

== Recognition ==
Leandro Katz's work has earned the Guggenheim Fellowship, the Rockefeller Foundation Fellowship, and the National Endowment for the Arts Fellowship, and he has received support from the New York State Council on the Arts, the Jerome Foundation, and the Hubert Bals Fund, Rotterdam International Film Festival. His film, The Day You'll Love Me won the Coral Prize at the Festival del Nuevo Cine Latinoamericano de La Habana, among others. In 2021 he was awarded the Premio Nacional a la Trayectoria by the National Minister of Culture, Argentina, 109 Salón Nacional.

== Exhibitions ==
Leandro Katz has exhibited as an artist, and screened his films, at institutions including the Museum of Modern Art, Whitney Museum of American Art, the New Museum of Contemporary Art, El Museo del Barrio, the Brooklyn Museum, MoMA PS1, the Chicago Art Institute, the Museum of Contemporary Art, Los Angeles, the Buenos Aires Museum of Modern Art, the Bienal de La Habana, Cuba, and the Museo Nacional Centro de Arte Reina Sofía, among others.

Recent exhibitions include Encuentros de Pamplona 72: fin de fiesta del arte experimental, Museo Nacional Centro de Arte Reina Sofía, Madrid, Natural History, Henrique Faría Gallery, NY, Imán-New York, Fundacion Proa, Buenos Aires, 10,000 Lives – Gwangju Biennale, South Korea, Leandro Katz: Arrebatos, Diagonales y Rupturas (Raptures, Diagonals and Ruptures), Espacio Fundación Telefónica, Buenos Aires, a retrospective with films and installations from 1965 to 2013, curated by Bérénice Reynaud, and Leandro Katz | obras (Works and Alphabets), Herlitzka+Faria, Buenos Aires, Argentina. El Rastro de la Gaviota – (The Seagull’s Footprint), Tabacalera, curated by Berta Sichel, Madrid 2017. Getty Museum – Photography in Argentina 1850-2010 The J.Paul Getty Museum, curated by Idurre Alonso and Judy Keller, Los Angeles, California 2017. Proyecto para el día que me quieras y la danza de fantasmas - (Project for the day you'll love me and the ghost dance) -Museo Universitario de Arte Contemporáneo - MUAC, Mexico City, 2018, and Fundación Proa, Buenos Aires, curated by Cuauhtémoc Medina, Amanda de la Garza, and Cecilia Rabossi. Chosen Memories: Contemporary Latin American Art from the Patricia Phelps de Cisneros Gift and Beyond The Museum of Modern Art, New York, 2023, curated by Inés Katzenstein. Leandro Katz: La Noche y las Palabras Museo Nacional de Bellas Artes, 2026, curated by Mariana Marchesi and Francisco Lemus.

== Filmography ==
- CROWD 7X7 (1976) 16mm., 20 min., color, silent.
- LOS ANGELES STATION (1976) 16mm., 10 min., color, silent.
- TWELVE MOONS (& 365 SUNSETS) (1976), S8, 30 min., toned B&W, audiotape.
- MOONSHOTS (1976) 16mm., 17 min., color, silent.
- THE SHADOW (1976) 16mm., 20 min., color, silent.
- FALL (1977) 16mm., 20 min., color, silent.
- PARIS HAS CHANGED A LOT (1977) 16mm., 25 min., color, sound, vertical screen.
- SPLITS (1978) 16mm., 25 min., color, sound.
- MOON NOTES (1980) 16mm., 15 min., color, silent.
- THE VISIT (Foreign Particles) (1980) 35mm. slide sequence, 75 min., B&W, sync sound.
- METROPOTAMIA (1982) 16mm., 25 min., color, sound, zig-zag screen.
- THE JUDAS WINDOW (1982) 16mm., 17 min., color, silent.
- THE VISIT (1986) 16mm., 30 min., black and white, sound.
- REEL SIX, Charles Ludlam's Grand Tarot (1987) 16mm., 8 min., color, sound.
- MIRROR ON THE MOON (1992) 16mm., 100 min., color, sound.
- EL DIA QUE ME QUIERAS (1997) 16mm., 30 min., color, sound.
- PARADOX (2001), digital video, 30 min., color, sound.
- EXHUMACION (2007), digital video, 38 min., color, sound.
- BLUEBEARD by CHARLES LUDLAM (1970-20012), video, 9.15 min., black and white, sound.
- RHOMB (2011), digital video, 6 mins., color, sound.
- A LOVE FOR 3 OR 4 ORANGES (2015), digital video, 10 mins., color, sound.
- LOLA PASHALINSKI and MISS CUBBIDGE (2002), digital video, 25 mins., color, sound.
- JOHN VACCARO and THE THEATRE OF THE RIDICULOUS (2002), digital video, 17 mins.,color, sound.
- OS.TEN.DE (2009), digital video, 28 mins., color, sound.
- MOUND (2024), digital video, 5 mins., color, sound.
- MIRROR ON THE MOON (1992/2025) restored version, digital video, 100 mins., color, sound.

== Collections ==
- Museo Universitario Arte Contemporáneo (MUAC), UNAM – Mexico City
- Canadian Centre for Architecture – Montreal, Canada
- The Getty Center for the History of Art and the Humanities – Santa Monica, California
- The Museum of Modern Art Library – New York
- The Ruth and Marvin Sackner Archive – Florida
- The Houghton Library, Rare Book Collection, Harvard University – Massachusetts
- The Brooklyn Museum, Prints and Photographs Collection – New York
- El Museo del Barrio – Permanent Collection – New York
- Museo de Arte Moderno de Buenos Aires (MAMBA), Permanent Collection, Argentina
- Sterling Memorial Library – Artists’ Books Collection, Yale University, New Haven, CT
- Museo Castagnino, Rosario, Argentina
- The Museum of Modern Art – Latin American Collection, New York
- CeDinCi Archive, Buenos Aires, Argentina
- The University of New Mexico Museum, Albuquerque, New Mexico
- The New York Public Library at Lincoln Center, Billy Rose Collection
- The Watermill Center, Robert Wilson's Theatre Collection
- The Museum of Modern Art – Photography Collection, New York
- Museo Nacional Centro Reina Sofía, Madrid, Spain
- Colección Patricia Phelps de Cisneros, New York
- The J.Paul Getty Museum, Los Angeles, California
- Museum of Fine Arts Boston, Massachusetts
- Blanton Museum of Art, Austin, Texas
- Power Station of Art, Shanghai
- Museo Nacional de Bellas Artes. Buenos Aires
