= Jorge Enrique Adoum =

Ecuadorian writer

- Born: Jorge Enrique Adoum Aud; June 29, 1926; Ambato, Ecuador
- Died: July 3, 2009 (aged 83); Quito, Ecuador
- Occupation: Writer
- Spouse(s): Magdalena Jaramillo Cabezas (years married: (1948-Unknown), Nicole Rouan (years married: 1977-2009)
- Writing career
- Notable work: Entre Marx y Una Mujer Desnuda (1976)
- Notable awards: Premio Eugenio Espejo (1989), Xavier Villaurrutia Prize (1976), Casa de las Américas (1960)

Jorge Enrique Adoum (June 29, 1926 in Ambato – July 3, 2009 in Quito) was an Ecuadorian writer, poet, politician, and diplomat. He was one of the major exponents of Latin American poetry. His work received such prestigious awards as the first Casa de las Américas Prize in Cuba, the most important honor in Latin American letters. Though hailed by Nobel Prize winner Pablo Neruda as the best poet of his generation in Latin America, Adoum's work is unknown in the English-speaking world.

== Biography ==
Jorge Enrique Adoum was born in Ambato, Ecuador in 1926 of Lebanese descent. He wrote close to 30 books and 3 novels.

Adoum's father was Jorge Elías Francisco Adoum (1897-1958), and his mother was Juana Auad Barciona (died 1953). His father Francisco Adoum was Lebanese and migrated to Ecuador where he made Arabic-to-Spanish translations, painted, sculpted, composed music, practiced natural medicine, and wrote more than 40 volumes on occult sciences and masonry which he published under the pseudonym "Mago Jefa". He also had a private practice for hypnotism, magnetism and suggestion, and made numerous healings considered miraculous in his time. Since 1945 he traveled to Chile, Argentina, and Brazil. He died in Rio de Janeiro in 1958 at 61 years old.

In 1948 Adoum married Magdalena Jaramillo Cabezas with whom he had 2 daughters. He later divorced Magdalena.

Adoum is best known for his novel Entre Marx y una Mujer Desnuda (Between Marx and a Naked Woman), which received Mexico's Xavier Villaurrutia Prize. This was the first time the award was given to a foreigner. The fictional character José Gálves is loosely based on the 1930s Ecuadorian novelist Joaquín Gallegos Lara.

Adoum was Pablo Neruda's personal secretary for nearly two years in Chile. In 1963 he traveled to Egypt, India, Japan and Israel, with a grant from UNESCO's Major Project on the Mutual Appreciation of Eastern and Western Cultural Values. Unable to return to Ecuador because of the military dictatorship of 1964-1966, he worked in the People's Republic of China. From 1964-1986 he worked in Beijing (China) and then in Geneva and Paris. In 1987 he returned to his homeland.

Adoum married Nicole Rouan from Gimel, Switzerland in 1977. They first met in Geneva in 1970 when Nicole was an actress in the French-version of his new play "El sol bajo las patas de los caballos" (French title: “Le Soleil Foule Par Les Chevaux”, English title: "The Sun Trampled Beneath the Horses' Hooves"). "She offered us cherries and a moment of pleasant company," is how Julio Cortázar referred to Nicole Rouen in the first few pages of The Autonauts of the Cosmoroute. Nicole translated Adoum's work into French. She died on July 13, 2011.

Adoum also translated works from the following authors into the Spanish language: T. S. Eliot, Langston Hughes, Jacques Prévert, Yiannis Ritsos, Vinicius de Moraes, Nâzım Hikmet, Fernando Pessoa, Joseph Brodsky, and Seamus Heaney.

Adoum's play "The Sun Trampled Beneath the Horses' Hooves" was translated into 6 languages (including English in 1974 by Arthur McMurray and Robert Marquez). A selection of poems was translated into English titled "Disinterred Love" (2012) by Katherine M. Hedeen and Victor Rodriguez Nunez. Adoum's other works have not been translated into English yet.

Adoum died at the age of 83 of heart failure in Quito on July 3, 2009. His ashes were buried under "The Tree of Life" next to the ashes of his close friend Oswaldo Guayasamín, beside Guayasamín's home in the hills overlooking Quito.

== Political activity ==
As a teenager Jorge Enrique Adoum tried to join the Communist Party of Ecuador but was turned down because he was too young. He was a believer of communist ideology. The name "Marx" in the title of his most famous book "Between Marx and a Naked Woman" refers to Karl Marx the author of The Communist Manifesto.

In 2006, Adoum signed a petition in support of the independence of Puerto Rico from the United States of America.

== Awards and recognitions ==
In 1960 he became the first recipient of the Cuban Casa de las Américas Prize for poetry, an award which is now one of Latin America's oldest and most prestigious literary awards. In 1976 Adoum's novel "Entre Marx y Una Mujer Desnuda" received Mexico's Xavier Villaurrutia Prize. This was the first time the award was given to a foreigner. In 1989, Adoum was awarded Ecuador's National Prize in Literature "Premio Eugenio Espejo" presented by the President of Ecuador for his works.

Adoum has been nominated for the Miguel de Cervantes Prize, the most prestigious and remunerative award given for Spanish-language literature. In 1952 the Chilean poet Pablo Neruda (who would win the 1971 Nobel Prize in Literature) declared: "Ecuador has the greatest poet in [Latin] America" in reference to Adoum.

== Work ==
Poetry:

- Ecuador Amargo (1949)
- Carta para Alejandra (1952)
- Los Cuadernos de La Tierra: I. Los Orígenes, II. El Enemigo y la Mañana (1952)
- Notas del Hijo Pródigo (1953)
- Relato del Extranjero (1955)
- Los Cuadernos de la Tierra: III. Dios Trajo la Sombra (1959)
- Los Cuadernos de la Tierra: IV. El Dorado y las Ocupaciones Nocturnas (1961)
- Informe Personal Sobre la Situación (1975)
- No Son Todos Los Están (1979)
- Poesía Viva del Ecuador (1990)
- Disinterred Love (2012) a collection of poems translated into English by Katherine M. Hedeen and Victor Rodriguez Nunez

Novels:

- Entre Marx y Una Mujer Desnuda (1976)
- Ciudad sin Ángel (1995)
- Los Amores Fugaces (1997)

Essays:

- Ecuador: Señas Particulares (2000)
- De cerca y de memoria (2002)

Theater:

- El sol bajo las patas de los caballos (1970) (English trans., The Sun Trampled Beneath the Horses' Hooves, 1974, by Arthur McMurray and Robert Marquez)

== See also ==
- César Dávila Andrade
- Luis Costales
- Jorge Carrera Andrade
