= Generación decapitada =

Ecuadorian literary group

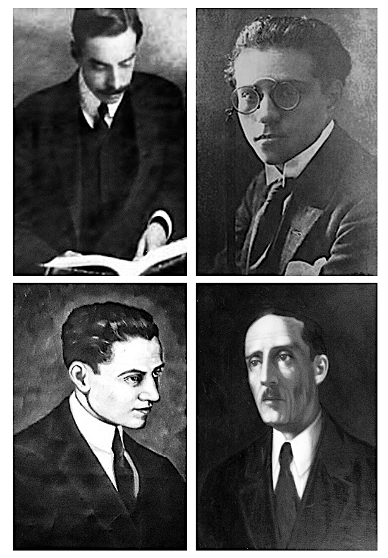
The four writers of Generación decapitada

The Generación decapitada (Spanish for "Beheaded/Decapitated Generation") was a literary group formed by four young Ecuadorian poets in the first decades of the 20th century. The group comprised two men from the city of Guayaquil, Medardo Ángel Silva and Ernesto Noboa y Caamaño, and two from Quito, Arturo Borja and Humberto Fierro. These four writers were greatly influenced by the modernist movement of Rubén Darío and by 19th-century French romantic poetry. They all read this poetry—by Baudelaire, Hugo, Rimbaud, and Verlaine—in the original French.

The group is called "decapitada", or decapitated, because each member committed suicide at a young age. Though they knew each other and dedicated poems to each other, they never met together to create a true literary group. The term "generación decapitada" originated in the middle of the 20th century, when Ecuadorian journalists and historians decided to name them, noting similarities in the authors' poetry.
