= Simón Corral =

Ecuadorian poet and dramatist

Simón Corral (Quito, January 5, 1946) is an Ecuadorian poet and dramatist.

He studied sociology at the Central University of Ecuador, and was the president of the Federation of University Students of Ecuador. He was later a professor at the Central University of Ecuador.

He took part in the Tsantzismo movement of the 1960s, Ecuador.

== Works ==
- El cuento de don Mateo (1966; Don Mateo's Story)
- El ejercito de Runas (1970; The Runas' Army)
