= Fanny León Cordero =

Ecuadorian jurist and poet (1920–2011)

- Born: 15 October 1920; Gualaceo, Ecuador
- Died: September 2011 (aged 90)
- Education: Graduated in Legal Sciences until 1945
- Alma mater: Central University of Ecuador
- Occupations: Judge, poet

Fanny León Cordero (15 October 1920 – September 2011) was an Ecuadorian jurist and poet. In 1947, she became the first female judge in Ecuador.

== Biography ==
León Cordero attended primary school at the Sagrados Corazones de Cuenca school. In 1939, she graduated from the previously all-male Benigno Malo high school in Cuenca, becoming its first woman graduate. León Cordero received the Juan Bautista Vásquez merit medal and a scholarship from the municipality of Cuenca to the Central University of Ecuador.

In 1945, León Cordero graduated from the university with a degree in legal sciences first in her class. Later, she obtained the title of doctor in jurisprudence.

== Background ==
Alejandro Dávila Cordero, judge of the Supreme Court of Justice, nominated León Cordero to be judge of the Salcedo district. On 17 August 1947, she became the first female judge in the history of Ecuador. León Cordero held the position for 31 years and during that period of time she emphasized her work on causes that affected the most unprotected people.

In the literary field, León Cordero stood out for her poetry. She was also part of the Association of Contemporary Writers of Ecuador, who later named their annual poetry contest after her. In March 2004 Leon Cordero received the Valdivia award for her literary work, delivered by women's organizations in the country, including the Commission of Women, Children and the Family of the National Congress.

In March 2003, León Cordero was decorated by the president of the Supreme Court of Justice, Armando Bermeo. In 2009, she received an award during the celebrations for the 90th anniversary of Salcedo.

León Cordero died in September 2011, at the age of 90.

== Works ==
- En las voces del río (1995)
