= Violeta Luna =

Ecuadorian poet, essayist, professor and literary critic

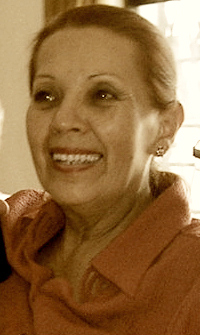
- Born: 24 February 1943 (age 83); Guayaquil, Ecuador
- Occupations: Poet, novelist and professor

Violeta Luna (born 24 February 1943 in Guayaquil) is an Ecuadorian poet, essayist, professor and literary critic.

== Awards ==
- Award "A los mejores cuentos", 1969.
- Poetry National Award "Ismael Pérez Pazmiño", Diario El Universo, Guayaquil, 1970.
- Jorge Carrera Andrade Award, Quito, 1994.

== Published works ==
=== Poetry ===
- Poesía universitaria (Quito, 1964)
- El ventanal del agua (Quito, 1965)
- Y con el sol me cubro (Quito, 1967)
- Posiblemente el aire (Quito, 1970)
- Ayer me llamaba primavera (Quito, 1973)
- La sortija de la lluvia (Guayaquil, 1975)
- Memorias de humo (Quito, 1987)
- Las puertas de la hierba (Quito, 1994)
- Solo una vez la vida (Quito, 2000)
- La oculta candela (Quito, 2005)
- Poesía Junta (Quito, 2005)

=== Tales ===
- Los pasos amarillos (Quito, 1970)

=== Essays ===
- La lírica ecuatoriana (Guayaquil, 1973)

=== Anthologies ===
- Lírica ecuatoriana contemporánea (Bogotá, 1979)
- Diez escritoras ecuatorianas y sus cuentos (Guayaquil, 1982)
- Poesía viva del Ecuador (Quito, 1990)
- Between the Silence of Voices: An Anthology of Contemporary Ecuadorean Women Poets (Quito, 1997)
- Antología de narradoras ecuatorianas (Quito, 1997)
- Poesía erótica de mujeres: Antología del Ecuador (Quito, 2001)
