= Iván Oñate =

Ecuadorian poet and academic

Iván Oñate is an Ecuadorean poet and academic. Oñate was born in on March 17, 1948, in Ambato, Ecuador. He lives in Quito, Ecuador. He has been called “the most original poet of the new generation” by French critics Jean Franco and Jean-Marie Lemogodeuc They further remark that “one must pay attention to his disquieting visions, to his taste for life and vertigo, to his wild revelations mixing anguish and delirium.” He has published eight books of poetry and fiction, and his widely anthologized work has been translated into at least five languages.

Oñate is a professor of Semiotics and Latin American Literature at the Central University of Ecuador.

== Works ==
=== Poetry ===
- Estadía poética (Argentina,1968)
- En casa del ahorcado (Quito, 1977)
- El ángel ajeno (Quito, 1983)
- Anatomía del vacío (Quito, 1988)
- El fulgor de los desollados -antología- (Quito, 1992)
- La nada sagrada (Quito, 1999).
- La frontera (Editorial Arquitrave. Bogotá, 2006).
- El país de las tinieblas (Ediciones de Medianoche. Mexico, 2008.)

=== Stories ===
- El hacha enterrada, (Quito, 1987).
- La canción de mi compañero de celda (Quito, 1995).

=== Anthologies ===
- Palabras y contrastes (Cuenca, 1984)
- Poesía viva del Ecuador (Quito, 1990)
- La palabra perdurable (Quito, 1991)
- Erzählungen aus Spanisch Amerika -cuentos hispanoamericanos- (DTV, Alemania, 1992)
- Anthologie de la littérature Hispano-américaine du XXe siècle (Francia, 1993)
- Diez cuentistas ecuatorianos (Quito, 1993)
- Doce cuentistas ecuatorianos (Quito, 1995)
- Veintiún cuentistas ecuatorianos (Quito, 1996)
- Antología de la poesía cósmica (México, 1996)
- Antología básica del cuento ecuatoriano (Quito, 1998)
- World poetry 2000 (2000)
- Cuento ecuatoriano contemporáneo (México, 2000).
- Der Wundertäter - El milagrero, Erzählungen aus Süd- und Mittelamerika (DTV, Alemania, 2006)
- La poesía del siglo XX en Ecuador, (Colección Visor de Poesía, Madrid, 2007)
- Cauteloso engaño del sentido (Rei Berroa editor, Colección Libros de la Luna, Rep. Dominicana 2007)
- Antología de la poesía latinoamericana al siglo XXI (Editorial Difácil, Valladolid, 2007)
- Pasión de Papel. Cuentos sobre el mundo del libro (Editorial Páginas de Espuma, Madrid, 2007)
