= Iván Carvajal =

Ecuadorian poet, philosopher and writer (1948–2026)

- Born: Iván Carvajal Aguirre; 1948; San Gabriel, Ecuador
- Died: 6 September 2026 (aged 78)
- Occupation: Writer
- Writing career
- Notable awards: Aurelio Espinosa Pólit Prize (1984), Premio a las Libertades Juan Montalvo (2013)
- Movement: Tsantzismo

Iván Carvajal Aguirre (1948 – 6 September 2026) was an Ecuadorian poet, philosopher and writer. He was born in San Gabriel, Carchi province. In 1984 he received Ecuador's National Prize for Literature, the Aurelio Espinosa Pólit prize, for his work "Parajes". In February 2013 he won the Premio a las Libertades Juan Montalvo.

Carvajal lived in Quito and worked as a professor at the Pontifical Catholic University of Ecuador. He directed País Secreto magazine and was project director of Corporación Cultural Orogenia.

Most of his work is devoted to poetry, though he also published some reflections on Ecuadorian poets ("A la zaga del animal imposible") and culture and politics in Ecuador ("¿Volver a tener patria?").

Carvajal died on 6 September 2026, at the age of 78.

== Bibliography ==
- "Poemas de un mal tiempo para la lírica". Colección Populibros, Universidad Central. Quito, 1980.
- "Del avatar". Colección Letras del Ecuador, C.C.E. del Guayas, 1981.
- "Los amantes de Sumpa". Vivavida. Quito, 1984.
- "Parajes". Ediciones de la Universidad Católica, EDUC. Quito, 1984. (National Prize for Literature "Aurelio Espinosa Pólit”, 1983)
- "Material de lectura, Iván Carvajal". Dirección de Literatura, Coordinación de Difusión Cultural UNAM. México, 1991.
- "En los labios / la celada". Eskeletra Editorial. Quito, 1996.
- "Ópera". Quito, 1997. (Non-commercial, limited edition of 300 numbered books).
- "Inventando a Lennon". Ediciones Libri Mundi/Enrique Grosse-Luemern. Quito, 1997.
- "Del avatar". Segunda Edición. Ediciones El Tábano. Quito, 1998.
- "Los amantes de Sumpa". Second Edition.
- "La ofrenda del cerezo". Ediciones Libri Mundi/Enrique Grosse-Luemern. Quito, 2000.
- "Tentativa y zozobra. Antología 1970- 2000". Visor Libros. Madrid, 2001.
- "La casa del furor". La Poesía, señor hidalgo. Barcelona, 2004.
- "Topologías". Dance, music and poetry Performance at Teatro Bolívar. Quito, 2005. (DVD Format)
- "A la zaga del animal imposible. Lecturas de la poesía ecuatoriana del siglo XX". Serie Estudios Literarios y Culturales. Centro Cultural Benjamín Carrión. Quito, 2005.
- "¿Volver a tener patria?". In “La cuadratura del círculo – cuatro ensayos sobre la cultura ecuatoriana”. Corporación Cultural Orogenia. Quito, 2006.
