= Luis Francisco Urquizo Cuesta =

Ecuadorian poet and painter

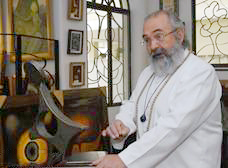
Luis Francisco Urquizo Cuesta

Luis Francisco Urquizo Cuesta (born 1950) is an Ecuadorian poet and painter. He was born in 1950 in the city of Ambato, surrounded by valleys and mountains. His father Pablo Arturo was a biologist and professor. From a young age, he visited the studio of the painter Voroshilov Bazante Castro.

In 1965, he had his first exhibition at the Colegio Mera de La Salle in Ambato, where he did his primary and secondary education. Having studied art with Bazante Castro until 1969, he went to study at the Central University of Ecuador in Quito in 1970. He also studied at the Universidad Técnica de Ambato.

In 1979 he was invited by Oswaldo Guayasamín to hold an exhibition of his work at the Guayasamin Museum in Quito. In 1980 he exhibited his paintings at the Las Peñas Cultural Association in Guayaquil and Salinas. In 1991 he was invited to exhibit at the Andrés Bello Convention Center in Lima, Peru, and also at the Biennale in Valparaíso, Chile.

His major work "The Absolute Symbols" was donated in perpetuity to the city of Ambato, to be exhibited permanently at the Pachano Lalama Museum.

He has also published poetry, for example, the volume entitled “El origen del deseo”.
