= Margarita Laso =

Ecuadorian writer

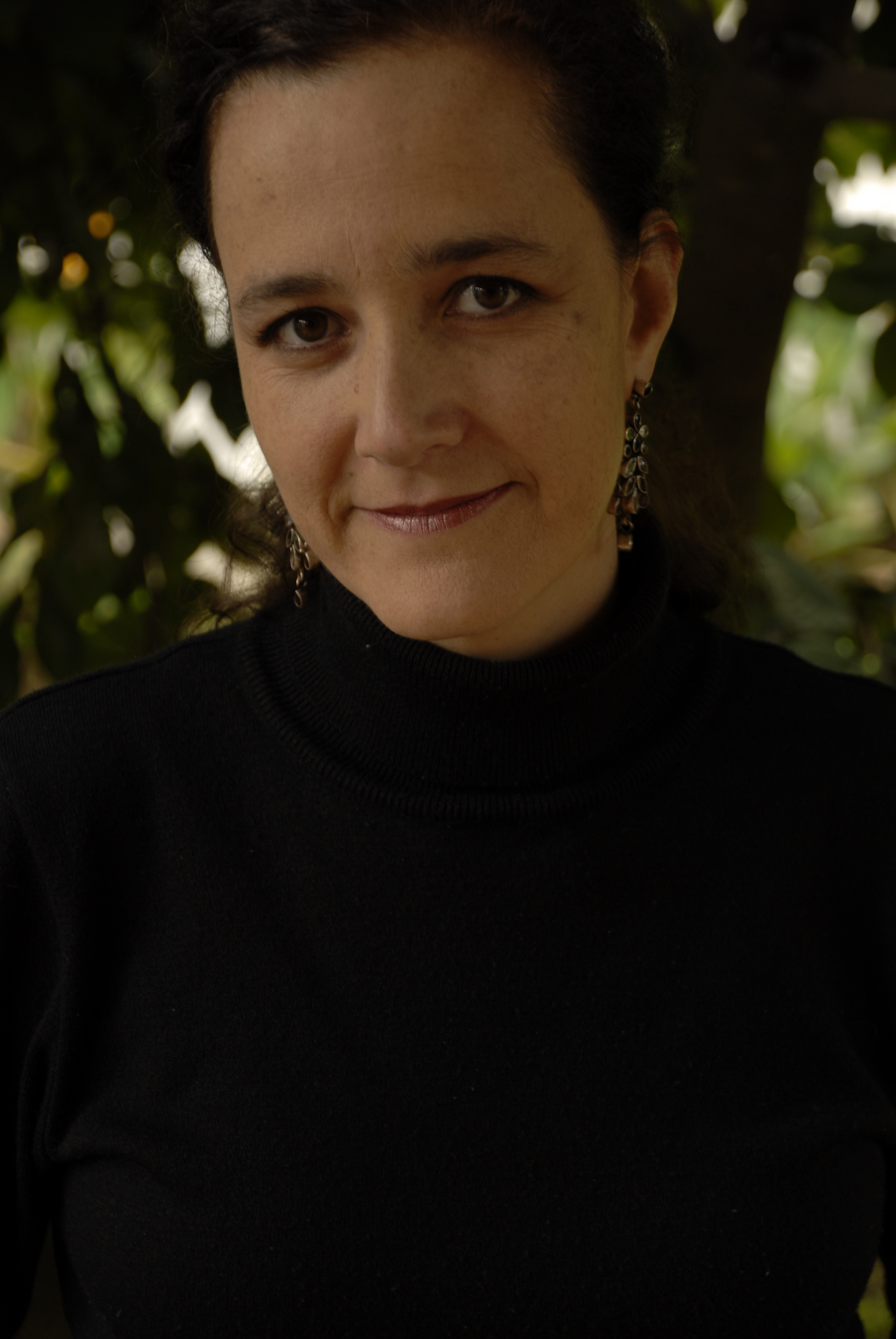
- Margarita Laso in 2008
- Born: 19 July 1963 (age 61); Quito, Ecuador
- Occupation: Writer

Margarita Laso (born 20 July 1963), is an Ecuadorian singer, writer and producer. Laso specialises in the interpretation of songs based on traditional and regional genres of Ecuador and popular songs.

== Career ==
Laso began her musical training listening to her father sing tangos and tunes, boleros and songs from Ecuador. At the age of eight, she began her studies of piano and later of guitar, and later studied singing with Blanca Hauser.

In 1989, she performed her first stage production as a soloist and since then she has given recitals, shows and recordings throughout Ecuador with a repertoire that includes boleros, traditional Latin American and Ecuadorian music, carols and tangos. With several awards throughout her professional career, she has directed her work to the growth of local and national artistic activity and the expansion of Ecuadorian and Latin American music. She has recorded 12 CDs with various themes.

She worked as an editor for several publications and has published five poetry books. She participates in readings, recitals and international meetings of writers and poets. In 1997, she won the Jorge Carrera Andrade Award for her book The Line of Cobras.

She is also a columnist for the Hoy newspaper of Quito.

== Selected works ==
- 1991 – Erosonera
- 1994 – Queden en la lengua mis deseos
- 1997 – El trazo de las cobras
- 2004 – Los lobos desarmados
- 2012 – La fiera consecuente

== Discography ==
=== Albums ===
- 1992 – Luna desnuda.
- 1997 – Canciones de cuna y villancicos
- 1998 – Apostemos que me caso
- 2002 – Más bueno que el pan
- 2005 – El Canelazo
- 2009 – Fiestas de Navidad
- Villancicos Canciones de Cuna

=== Singles and EPs ===
- 1991 – Piel de Trigo

=== Others ===
- 2000 – Gallito Verde. (Christmas Carol)
- 2009 – Vivir en este Carpuela (Ecuadorian songs)
- 2009 – Manito de Cera. (Christmas Latinoamericans songs)
- 2009 – Garganta con Arena. (Tangos)
- 2009 – Corazoncito. (Ecuadorian songs)

== Poems ==
- The Lions' Abattoir
- Cold Blood
- Lotus
- Ferris Wheel
- Parakeets
- At the pole the pelt hunters stalk seals
