= Luis Alberto Costales =

Ecuadorian poet, philosopher, teacher, speaker, historian, farmer and politician

- Born: 24 December 1926 Riobamba, Ecuador
- Died: 1 February 2006 (aged 79) Riobamba, Ecuador
- Occupation: Politician, poet, writer
- Notable awards: First Prize Modern Art Quito; 1993
- Spouse: Violeta Terán
- Children: Luis Eduardo; María del Pilar; Carlos Rodrigo; Nanci Susana; Lucía Elena; Lourdes Jacqueline

Luis Alberto Costales Cazar (Riobamba, December 24, 1926 – Riobamba, February 1, 2006) was an Ecuadorian poet, philosopher, teacher, speaker, historian, farmer and politician.

He was a poet and writer who also extensively studied the history of his native city. His poetry, lyric and epic, often adhered to classical rhythm, metre and rhyme. He was an idealist philosopher, whose philosophy was based on firm moral principles projected beyond time and space.

Among his works are: Bucólicas y Una Vida Simple; Sobre el Pomo de la Tierra, Exiliado en el verso and Rutas de Sombra y de Sol. He is considered one of the figures never to have been awarded the Eugenio Espejo Prize.

He was co-founder of the Democratic Left Party, being a member of the First National Executive Council, which also comprised Alfredo Buendía, Rodrigo Borja, Fidel Jaramillo Terán, Efrén Cocíos and others.

Luis Alberto Costales was viewed as especially important in respect of his vocation for bringing up youth with high human and civic values.

== Biography ==
=== Early life ===
Luis was the son of Luis Arsecio Costales Cevallos and Esther Lucía Cazar Chávez. His childhood and youth were spent on farms owned by his parents: Maguazo, Lanlán, Ocpote and San Pablo. Here he came to know the indigenous people, spending much time with them doing farm work. He joined in with intimate family gatherings by candlelight, presided over by his father telling tales of the past as well as reading out classic novels and short stories.

His childhood was marked by hard events such as the death of loved ones, beatings at school, and the forceful character of his father, who constantly told the boy how he had to make himself a "man", and left him alone on long horserides by night. These experiences helped to form his personality. Once, passing a nearby church on horseback, he first heard the tolling of a bell, and at his tender age he thought it was a divine manifestation, so he decided to write his first poem.

In 1932 he began study at the Simon Bolivar School of Riobamba. The following year he entered the St Thomas the Apostle School (STAR) in Riobamba. His secondary education took place in the San Felipe Neri School of the same city, run by the Jesuits.

In 1945 he entered the Central University of Ecuador, in the city of Quito, joining the faculty of International Studies (Diplomacy), in which he was appointed Vice President of the Student Association. In 1950 he was awarded the first Inter-University Declaration of Human Rights Prize. Together with other young rebels of the time, including Abraham Romero Cabrera, he founded the Ecuadorian Nationalist Revolutionary Action movement (ARNE).

=== In the city of Quito ===
His time in Quito was spent in professional education and the cultivation of letters. Thus in frequenting the "Café Bohemia", a cafeteria located in the heart of the capital city, he had the opportunity to meet and make friends with renowned poets such as Benjamín Carrión and César Dávila Andrade (who was called "The Fakir"), among others. This contact with literary personalities of the time inspired his approach and his passion for literature.

At the age of 23, two years before finishing his university career, he married the distinguished Riobamba lady, Aída Violeta Terán Moncayo. After this he obtained his doctorate in International Law; his thesis was acclaimed and rests in the archives of the Central University.

While still in Quito he celebrated the arrival of his first son, Luis Eduardo, and on his return to his own beloved city, that of his daughters and second son: María del Pilar, Carlos Rodrigo, Lucía Elena, Nancy Susana and Lourdes Jacqueline.

=== Political career ===
In the political field, about the year 1959, he entered the ranks of the Radical Liberal Party, and was the Provincial Director for a period of eight consecutive years. Around 1960 he served as presidential campaign manager for Don Galo Plaza Lasso.

He was elected councillor of the Riobamba Canton in 1962, and in 1963 was appointed councillor of Chimborazo Province. In the same year he also served as Chairman of that body, a position that years later would be occupied by his first son Luis Eduardo Terán. Later, around 1967, he served as presidential campaign manager for his close friend Dr Andrew F. Córdova, who was fondly called "Lluro Cordova".

When the Liberal Party was dissolved, following the signing of the "Pacto Morderé", the Democratic Left party was born, at first as an independent movement. In the year 1970 the first convention of this movement was held in the city of Quito. Luis Alberto Costales became its first National President. By 1986 this party had become became the leading political power in Ecuador and raised Dr. Rodrigo Borja Cevallos to the Presidency of the Republic.

In 1988 Costales was appointed Provincial Director of Region 5 of the Social Security Institute of Ecuador (IESS), a post which brought great responsibility, for a period of three years. In the same year he founded the cultural group Ateneo José María Román of Chimborazo, at the request of his close friend and National President Dr Guillermo Bossano. In 1991, he was elected alternate deputy for the Democratic Left Party in the Province of Chimborazo. However, his most important position was to chair the Chimborazo Patriotic Board, a group that examined the border disputes with Perú. Costales travelled to Tiwintza canton in order to encourage the troops stationed there.

=== Last days ===
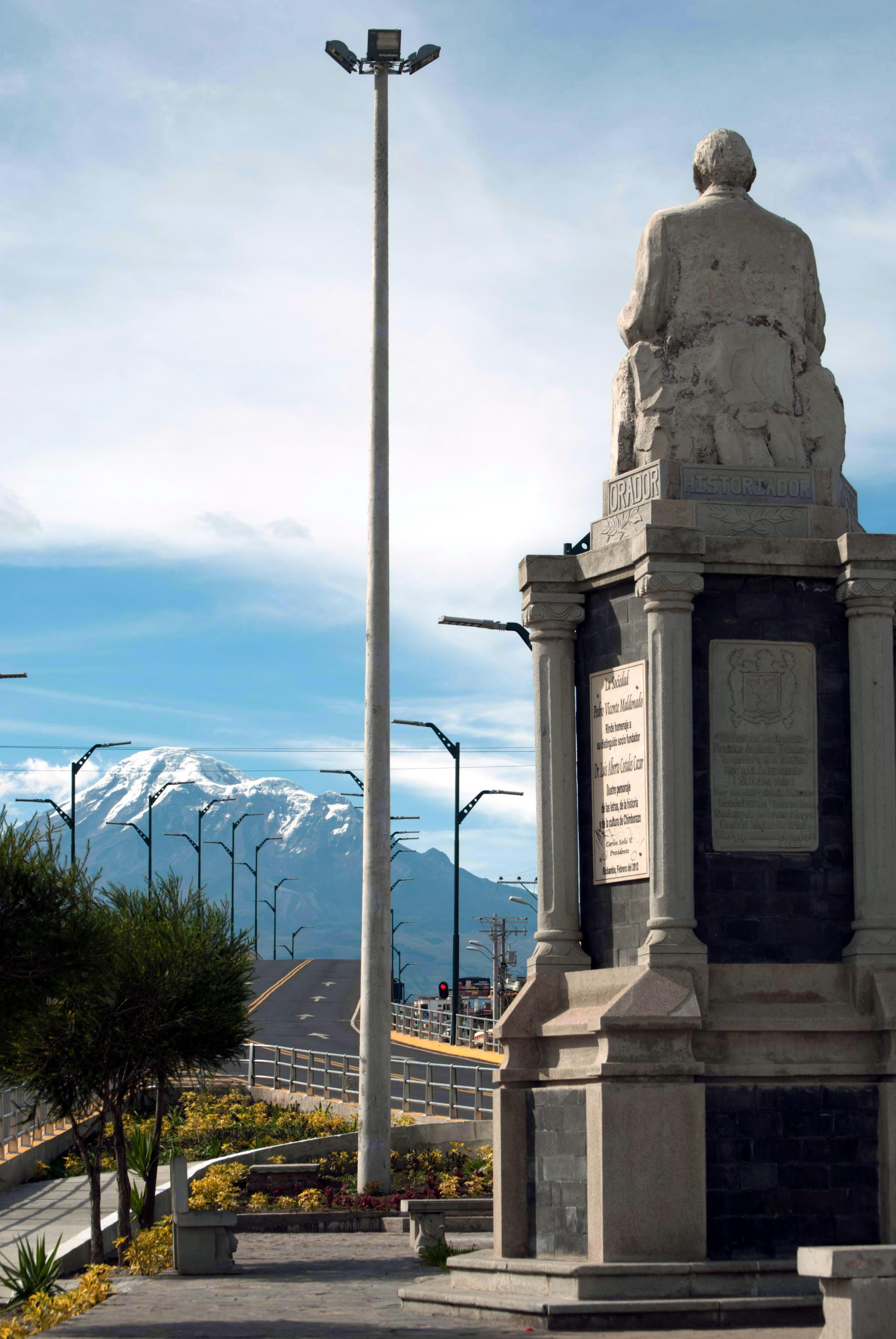
Luis Alberto Costales Cazar's monument in Riobamba(Eddie Crespo), 2009. In the background mount Chimborazo.

In 1993 he won first prize in poetry awarded by the Institute of Modern Arts, Quito.

He spent the last years of his life in retirement at his small villa in the city of Guano, a few kilometres from Riobamba. This dwelling he called "Office of Hope". He devoted himself to literary work, to thought, to deep reading and to philosophical knowledge.

In mid-2005, Luis Alberto Costales fell seriously ill, a victim of incurable lung cancer. In July of that year, the Benjamin Carrión House of Ecuadorian Culture of Chimborazo published his book Sobre el Pomo de la Tierra, for which he received tributes from several institutions and cultural bodies in the city.

He spent the last eight months of his life in this city, under the care of his family and friends. He died on February 1, 2006.

After his death, his children salvaged a large part of his work from his old desk, and compiled many of his writings, which they published in the book Exiliado en el verso, volumes 1 and 2.

In the Ecuadorian Library of Art and History in Quito there is a section with his name.

The city of Riobamba today possesses an imposing monument financed by his children dedicated to Costales and his work.

== See also ==
- César Dávila Andrade
- Luz Elisa Borja
