= Diógenes Cuero =

Ecuadorian poet and cultural activist (1948–2019)

Diógenes Cuero Caicedo (1948–2019) was an Ecuadorian poet and cultural activist. He was a prominent black voice in contemporary Ecuadorian literature.

== Early life and career ==
He was born in San Francisco de Ónzole, a poor black community in the Eloy Alfaro Canton in the north of Esmeraldas province. He worked at the Esmeraldas Refinery for Petroecuador in a number of managerial roles. He was a leading light in the Esmeraldas Petrolero Sports Club. He taught at the Luis Vargas Torres Technical University, where he rose to become dean of the engineering faculty.

For 20 years he hosted a radio program called "Raíces" on Radio Central Candela, where he spoke about the culture of his people. As a proponent of negritude, he helped to organize numerous black cultural events, for example, a series of marimba festivals in his region. In 1996, he was responsible for the creation of the world's biggest tapa'o. He matured late as a writer, only coming to it in the 1980s. He is known for books such as Tsunami, Mitología y Poesía and Las Huellas de la Carimba. His poetry made use of the artefact and symbols of his region: la guacharaca, la chautiza, la gualgura and la tunda.

== Death ==
He died in 2019, leaving behind seven children.

== Works ==
- Jugando a las Relaciones Humanas
- Petróleo, Realidad y Sindicalismo
- Tsunami, Mitología y Poesía
- CD. De poemas Tsunami.
- Las Huellas de la Carimba
- Me Quieren Quitar lo de Negro
