= Sonia Romo Verdesoto =

Ecuadorian poet

Sonia Romo Verdesoto de Augustín is an Ecuadorian poet. She was the only female member of the Tzantzismo movement in Ecuador during the 1960s.

She is the former Ecuadorian consul to Haiti.

== Works ==
Ternura del aire (1963)

She was interviewed by Susana Freire García for the book Tzantzismo: tierno e insolente (2008; Tzantzismo: Tender and Insolent), where she discussed her role in the movement and its influence and effects on Ecuadorian culture.
