= Benigna Dávalos Villavicencio =

Ecuadorian musician

Benigna Dávalos Villavicencio was an Ecuadorian musician, songwriter and composer. She is best known for the pasillo Angel de Luz for which she wrote both the words and the music. The song is known in Peru as "Rayo de Luz" and has been popularized by the duo Las Limeñitas.

Details of her birth and death are unclear; she is believed to have been born in Riobamba around the turn of the 20th century, and died in Quito in the 1960s. She lived in the La Tola neighborhood of Quito, where she was friends with contemporary cultural figures such as the Benítez Valencia Duo, Rodrigo Barreno (director of the Los Barrieros Ensemble), Marco Chiriboga Villaquirán, etc.

In August 2018, the Museum of the Ecuadorian Pasillo was inaugurated, where a statue of Benigna Dávalos stands among the statues of four other legendary pasillo composers.
