= Arturo Borja =

Ecuadorian poet (1892–1912)

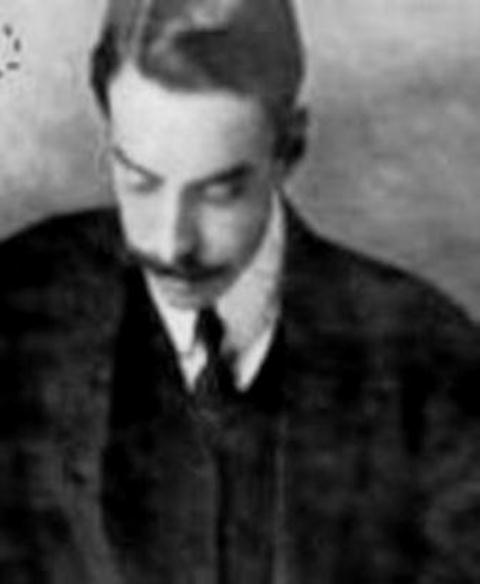
- Born: Arturo Borja Pérez; 1892; Quito, Ecuador
- Died: November 13, 1912 (aged 19–20); Quito, Ecuador
- Occupation: Poet
- Spouse: Carmen Rosa Sánchez Destruge
- Writing career
- Notable work: La flauta de ónix
- Literary movement: Modernismo, Symbolism, Generación decapitada

Arturo Borja Pérez (1892 – November 13, 1912) was an Ecuadorian poet who was part of a group known as the "Generación decapitada" (Decapitated Generation). He was the first in the group to excel as a modernist poet. He did not produce a lot of poetry, but the small amount of poetry he produced showed great quality. He published twenty poems in a book titled La flauta de ónix, and six other poems were published posthumously. The group is called "decapitada", or decapitated, because all its members committed suicide at a young age.

== Biography ==
Borja was born in Quito in 1892, a direct descendant of the third Duke of Gandía. His father, Luis Felipe Borja Perez, sent him to Paris to treat a disease in his eye when he was just entering adolescence.

Borja quickly mastered the French language. Soon he began to read the Symbolist poets, especially Baudelaire and Verlaine. His favorite verses were from Mallarmé, Samain, Baudelaire, Rimbaud, etc.

With respect to his relationship with the other poets of the Decapitated Generation, he was great friends of Humberto Fierro and Ernesto Noboa y Caamaño, with whom he had considerable correspondence during his life. Although he never met Medardo Ángel Silva in person, he professed a great admiration for him and dedicated to him the poem, "El árbol del bien y del mal" (The Tree of Good and Evil).

Borja married Carmen Rosa Sánchez Destruge on October 15, 1912. He dedicated the poems “Por el camino de las quimeras” and “En el blanco cementerio” to Carmen.

In a few years, the happiness he felt as a youth dissipated and he developed a desperate melancholy which was evident in his poems. He longed for death, and committed suicide in Quito on November 13, 1912, when he was only 20 years old. He died of a morphine overdose.

== The Decapitated Generation ==
The "Generación decapitada" (Decapitated Generation) was a literary group formed by four young Ecuadorian poets in the first decades of the 20th century. Two men from Guayaquil, Medardo Ángel Silva and Ernesto Noboa y Caamaño, and two men from Quito, Arturo Borja and Humberto Fierro, were the precursors of modernismo in Ecuador. These four writers were greatly influenced by the modernist movement of Rubén Darío and by 19th-century French romantic poetry. They read this poetry in its original language, by authors including Baudelaire, Hugo, Rimbaud, and Verlaine. This group is called "decapitada" because all of them committed suicide at a young age. Though they knew each other and dedicated poems to each other, they never met together to create a true literary group. The term "generación decapitada" originated in the middle of the 20th century, when Ecuadorian journalists and historians decided to name them, noting similarities in the authors' poetry.

== The Song “Para mí tu recuerdo” ==
His poem "Para mí tu recuerdo" (For Me Your Memory) was made into a pasillo song by composer Miguel Ángel Casares Viteri, and sung by vocalists such as Carlota Jaramillo and Bolívar “El Pollo” Ortiz.
