= Humberto Fierro =

Ecuadorian poet

- Born: 1890; Quito, Ecuador
- Died: August 23, 1929 (aged 38–39)
- Occupation: Writer

Humberto Fierro (1890 – August 23, 1929) was an Ecuadorian poet who was part of a group known as the "Generación decapitada" (Decapitated Generation). The group is called "decapitada", or decapitated, because all its members committed suicide at a young age.

In 1919, Fierro published his first book titled “El laúd en el valle” (The lute in the valley), his second book "Velada palatina" (Evening palate) was published 20 years after his death in 1949.

== The Decapitated Generation ==
The "Generación decapitada" (Decapitated Generation) was a literary group formed by four young Ecuadorian poets in the first decades of the 20th century. Two men from Guayaquil, Medardo Ángel Silva and Ernesto Noboa y Caamaño, and two men from Quito, Arturo Borja and Humberto Fierro, were the precursors of modernismo in Ecuador. These four writers were greatly influenced by the modernist movement of Rubén Darío and by 19th-century French romantic poetry. They all read this poetry in the original language, by authors including Baudelaire, Hugo, Rimbaud, and Verlaine. This group is called "decapitada", or decapitated, because all of them committed suicide at a young age. Though they knew each other and dedicated poems to each other, they never met together to create a true literary group. The term "generación decapitada" originated in the middle of the 20th century, when Ecuadorian journalists and historians decided to name them, noting similarities in the authors' poetry.

== Bibliography ==
Books of poetry

- El Laúd en el Valle (Quito, 1919)
- Velada Palatina (Quito, 1949).

Fierro's poems can also be found in the following anthologies:

- Indice de la poesía ecuatoriana contemporánea (Santiago de Chile, 1937)
- Antología de la moderna poesía ecuatoriana (Quito, 1949)
- Poetas parnasianos y modernistas (México, 1960)
- Otros modernistas (Guayaquil, s.f.)
- Poesía modernista (Quito, 1978)
- Poesía viva del Ecuador (Quito, 1990)
- La palabra perdurable (Quito, 1991)
- Poesía modernista ecuatoriana (Quito, 1991)
- Poesía modernista del Ecuador (Quito, 1992)
