= César Dávila Andrade =

Ecuadorian writer

- Born: October 5, 1918; Cuenca, Ecuador
- Died: May 2, 1967 (aged 48)

César Dávila Andrade (October 5, 1918, in Cuenca, Ecuador – May 2, 1967) was an Ecuadorian poet and writer.

His works displayed elements of neo-romanticism and surrealism.

He spent much of his life in Caracas, Venezuela.

== Works ==
=== Poems ===
- Oda al Arquitecto (1946).
- Espacio me has vencido (1947).
- Catedral salvaje (1951).
- Boletín y elegía de las mitas (1956).
- Arco de instantes (1959).
- En un lugar no identificado (1963).
- Conexiones de tierra (1964).

== See also ==
- Luis Costales
- Jorge Enrique Adoum
