= Ernesto Noboa y Caamaño =

Ecuadorian poet

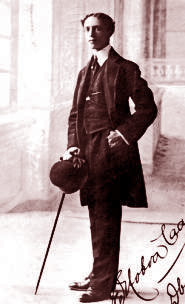
- Born: August 2, 1889; Guayaquil, Ecuador
- Died: December 7, 1927 (aged 38); Guayaquil, Ecuador
- Occupation: Poet
- Writing career
- Notable work: Emoción vesperal
- Literary movement: Modernismo, Symbolism, Generación decapitada

Ernesto Noboa y Caamaño (August 2, 1889 – December 7, 1927) was an Ecuadorian poet and a member of the "Generación decapitada" (The Decapitated Generation).

Noboa y Caamaño came from a wealthy family in Guayaquil, and was always plagued by a neuroses that only morphine could temporarily cure. He sought to ameliorate his mental condition by traveling to Europe, but no matter what he tried, he felt hopelessly lost, and without spirit to overcome the loneliness of this world. His poetry, coated with unmatched delicacy and perfection, shows the influence of Samain, Verlaine and Baudelaire. Almost all of his work, marked by anxiety and loathing, was collected in a book titled "Romanza de las Horas" (Romance of the Hours), published in 1922. For some, his poem "Emoción vesperal" (Vesperal Emotion) marked a new era of poetry in Ecuador. He is one of the most read poets in Ecuador, and many of his poems are recited and sung by the people. He also wrote some works of criticism.

== The Decapitated Generation ==
The "Generación decapitada" (Decapitated Generation) was a literary group formed by four young Ecuadorian poets in the first decades of the 20th century. Two men from Guayaquil, Medardo Ángel Silva and Ernesto Noboa y Caamaño, and two men from Quito, Arturo Borja and Humberto Fierro, were the precursors of modernismo in Ecuador. These four writers were greatly influenced by the modernist movement of Rubén Darío and by 19th-century French romantic poetry. They all read this poetry in the original language, by authors including Baudelaire, Hugo, Rimbaud, and Verlaine. This group is called "decapitada", or decapitated, because all of them committed suicide at a young age. Though they knew each other and dedicated poems to each other, they never met together to create a true literary group. The term "generación decapitada" originated in the middle of the 20th century, when Ecuadorian journalists and historians decided to name them, noting similarities in the authors' poetry.
