= Humberto Vinueza =

Ecuadorian poet and writer

Humberto Vinueza Rodríguez (Guayaquil 1942 – Quito 2017) was an Ecuadorian poet and writer. He lived in both Guayaquil and Quito in his youth, and went to study engineering in the USSR. His literary awakening happened in high school, when he encountered the works of Pablo Neruda, César Vallejo, Alfredo Gangotena, Jorge Carrera Andrade, Gonzalo Escudero, etc. He wrote some 15 books of poetry, winning several awards. He won the Jorge Carrera Andrade Award twice, in 1991 for Alias Lumbre de Acertijo, and in 2007 for Constelación del instinto. In 2012 the Casa de las Américas awarded him the José Lezama Lima Ibero-American Poetry Prize.

He was part of Los Tzántzicos, a cultural avant-garde group. He contributed to many publications such as Pucuna, La bufanda del sol, Letras del Ecuador, Eskeletra, Procontra, etc. He was also a diplomat, and served as Ambassador of Ecuador in Iran and Pakistan.
