= Medardo Ángel Silva =

Ecuadorian poet

Medardo Ángel Silva Rodas
- Born: 8 June 1898; Guayaquil, Ecuador
- Died: 10 June 1919 (aged 21); Guayaquil, Ecuador
- Occupation: Poet
- Writing career
- Notable work: El árbol del bien y del mal (918)
- Movements: Modernismo, Symbolism

Medardo Ángel Silva Rodas (June 8, 1898 at Guayaquil – June 10, 1919 at Guayaquil) was an Ecuadorian poet and a member of the Generación decapitada. The "Decapitated Generation" was a group of four young Ecuadorian poets in the first decades of the 20th century. Two men from Guayaquil, Medardo Ángel Silva and Ernesto Noboa y Caamaño, and two men from Quito, Arturo Borja and Humberto Fierro, were the precursors of modernismo in Ecuador. These four writers were greatly influenced by the modernist movement of Rubén Darío and by 19th-century French romantic poetry. Though they knew each other and dedicated poems to each other, they never met together to create a true literary group. The term "generación decapitada" originated in the middle of the 20th century, when Ecuadorian journalists and historians decided to name them, noting similarities in the authors' poetry.

Silva was the lowest class of the four poets, troubled by his dark skin and economic status. He did however attend a prestigious high school and work as a journalist at El Telégrafo, a major newspaper in the city. His poems reflect fantasy and a fascination with death. The cause of his own death is not certain; he died at 21 while visiting a young girlfriend. He is believed to have committed suicide, but may have been murdered as the result of a love triangle.

Silva's poem "El alma en los labios" was made into a song and made famous by the Ecuadorian singer Julio Jaramillo.

== Bibliography ==
- El árbol del bien y del mal (1918)
- María Jesú (novel, 1919)
- La máscara irónica (essays)
- Trompetas de oro
- El alma en los labios
- Obras completas (2004)
