= Jorge Carrera Andrade =

Ecuadorian poet, historian, and diplomat

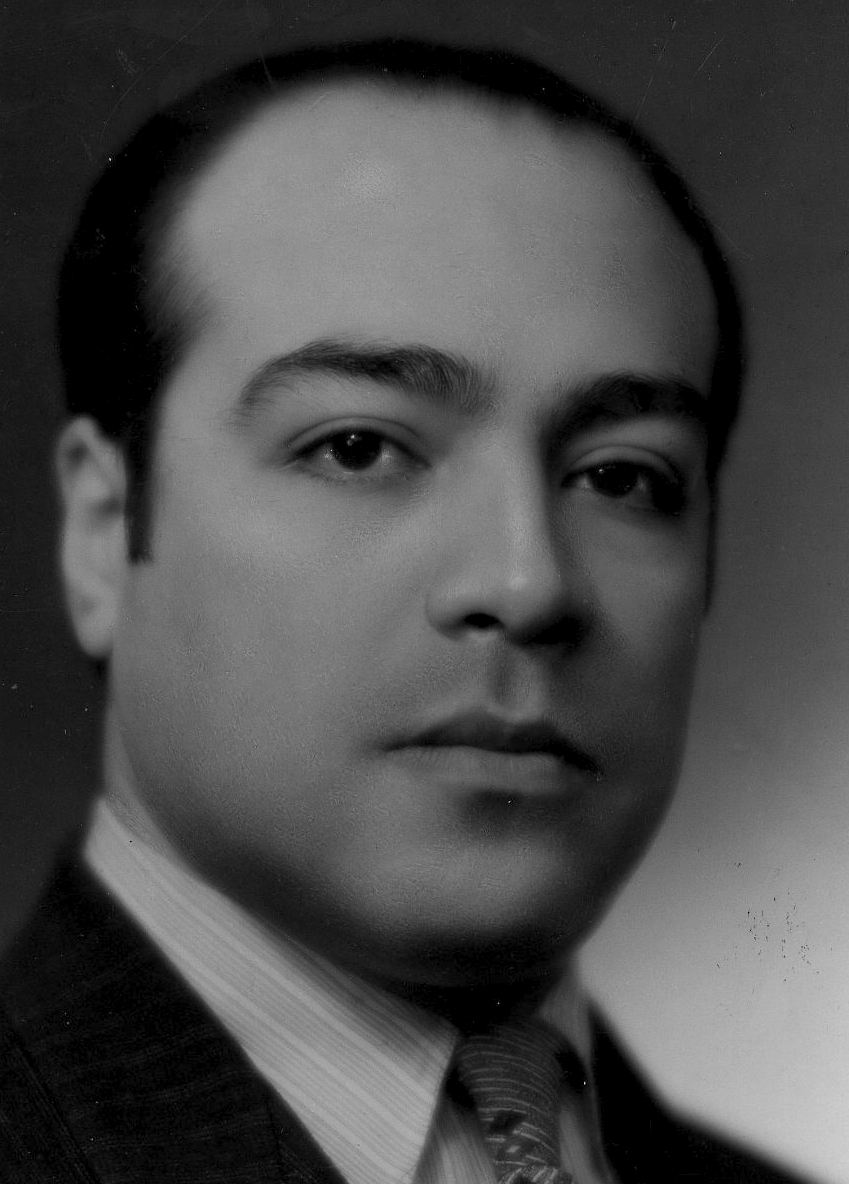
- As Consul General, Le Havre, France, 1932
- Born: September 18, 1903; Quito, Ecuador
- Died: November 7, 1978 (aged 75); Quito, Ecuador
- Occupation: Writer
- Writing career
- Notable awards: Premio Eugenio Espejo (1977)

Jorge Carrera Andrade was an Ecuadorian poet, historian, author, and diplomat during the 20th century. He was born in Quito, Ecuador in 1902. He died in 1978. During his life and after his death he has been recognized with Jorge Luis Borges, Vicente Huidobro, Gabriela Mistral, Pablo Neruda, Octavio Paz and Cesar Vallejo as one of the most important Latin American poets of the twentieth century.

== Writing and diplomatic career ==
His writing was published in Aurora Estrada y Ayala's literary magazine, "Proteo" which she started in 1922. Other contributors to the magazine included future Nobel Laureate Gabriela Mistral.

From 1928 to 1933 Carrera first experienced traveling in Europe. He served as Ecuadorian Consul in Peru, France, Japan and the United States. Later he became Ambassador to Venezuela, the United Kingdom, Nicaragua, France, Belgium, and the Netherlands. He also served as Secretary of State of Ecuador.

While living in the United States, Carrera developed many literary relationships with American writers, in particular Muna Lee whose critically acclaimed translation of his poetry, Secret Country, was published in 1946. His work was praised and championed by John Malcolm Brinnin, H. R. Hays, Archibald MacLeish, Carl Sandburg, William Jay Smith and William Carlos Williams. Carrera Andrade's poetic work developed for half a century in a number of volumes published worldwide.

In 1972 his Obra poetica completa, which gathers the totality of his lyric work, appeared in Quito. Most of his poetry has been translated into French, English, Italian and German. He also published books of essays, history and an autobiography, El volcan y el colibri (The Volcano and the Hummingbird) (1970).

After Carrera's diplomatic career ended in 1969, he was appointed distinguished visiting professor at Stony Brook University on Long Island, where he lectured for two academic years. He spent his last years in his native city of Quito, as director of the National Library of Ecuador. During his life and after his death he has been recognized with Jorge Luis Borges, Pablo Neruda, Octavio Paz and Cesar Vallejo as one of the most important Latin American poets of the twentieth century.

== A celebrated poet ==
In 2002 the Republic of Ecuador celebrated the century of his birth. In the same year a group of Ecuadorian intellectuals gathered in Cuenca, Ecuador, to examine the life and work of Carrera Andrade.

The Indonesian composer Ananda Sukarlan has set some of his short poems "Microgramas" to music for medium voice and piano. Commissioned by the Ecuador Embassy in Jakarta (Indonesia), they were premiered by the composer himself with the tenor William Prasetyo in October 2023.

== Bibliography ==
=== Prose In English ===
- Carrera Andrade, Jorge, "The New American and His Point of View Toward Poetry," tr. H.R. Hays, Poetry (Chicago), LXII, 1943, P. 88–105
- H.R. Hays, "Jorge Carrera Andrade: Magician of Metaphors", Books Abroad (Norman, OK), XVII, No. 2, 1943, P. 101–105.
- The Rediscovery of Jorge Carrera Andrade: A Celebration at Assumption College, An Introduction by Steven Ford Brown
- "Jorge Carrera Andrade in America" (Jacket magazine (Australia), July 2000)

=== Books In English ===
- Century of The Death of The Rose: The Selected Poems of Jorge Carrera Andrade, 1926–1976, translated from the Spanish by Steven Ford Brown, (second printing) University of Georgia Press: Athens, 2020 (introduction, poetry).
- Micrograms, tr. Alejandro de Acosta and Joshua Beckman, Wave Books: Seattle, 2011 (essay, poetry).
- Microgramas, Introduction by J. Enrique Ojeda, poetry translated from the Spanish by Steven Ford Brown, Orogenia Corporacion Cultural: Quito, 2007 (essay, poetry).
- Century of The Death of The Rose: The Selected Poems of Jorge Carrera Andrade, 1926–1976, translated from the Spanish by Steven Ford Brown, NewSouth Books: Louisville and Montgomery, 2002 (poetry).
- Reflections on Latin American Literature, tr. Don and Gabriela C. Bliss, State University of New York Press: Albany, 1973 (essays).
- The Selected Poems of Jorge Carrera Andrade, tr. H.R. Hays, State University of New York Press: Albany, 1972 (poetry).
- Secret Country, tr. Muna Lee, MacMillan: New York, 1946 (poetry).
- To The Oakland Bridge, tr. Eleanor Turnbull, Stanford University Press: Palo Alto, 1941 (poetry).

=== Books In Spanish ===
Autobiography

- The Volcano and The Hummingbird, Puebla, Mexico: Editorial Jose M. Caijica Jr., S.A., 1970.

Essays

- Interpretations of Hispano-America, Quito: Casa de la Cultura Ecuatoriana, 1967.
- Latitudes, Quito: Talleres Graficos Nacionales, 1934; Buenos Aires: Editor "Parseo",1940.
- History (A three volume history of Ecuador)
- The Kingdom of Quito or Street of The Sun, Quito: Case de la Cultura Ecuatriana, 1963.
- Gallery of Mystics and Insurgents, Quito: Casa de la Ecuatoriana, 1959.
- Earth Always Green, Paris: Ediciones Internacionales, 1955.

Memoir

- Traveller Through Countries and Books, Quito: Casa de la Cultura Ecuatoriana, 1961.

Poetry

- Poesia ultima, ed. with introduction, J. Enrique Qjeda, New York: Las Americas Publishing Co., 1968.
- Planetary Man, Quito: Editorial Elan, 1963.
- Family of Night, Paris: Libreria Espanola de Ediciones, 1953.
- Place of Origin, Caracas: Editions: Suma, 1944.
- Secret Country, Tokyo, Editions Aisa America, 1940.
- Anthology of Pierre Reverdy, Tokyo: Editions Asia America, 1939.
- Biography for The Use Of Birds, Paris: Cuadernos del Hombre Nuevo, 1937; French translation by Edmond Vandercammen, Brussels: Les Cahiers du Journal des Poetes, 1937.
- Time Manual, Madrid: Editions Literatura: PEN Coleccion, 1935; French translation by Adolphe de Falgairolle, Paris: Editions Rene Debresse, 1936.
- Earth and Sea Bulletines (Foreword by Gabriela Mistral), Barcelona: Editorial Cervantes, 1930.
- Indian Poems, Quito: Editorial Elan, 1928.
- Wreath of Silence, Quito: Casa de la Cultura Ecuatoriana, 1926.
