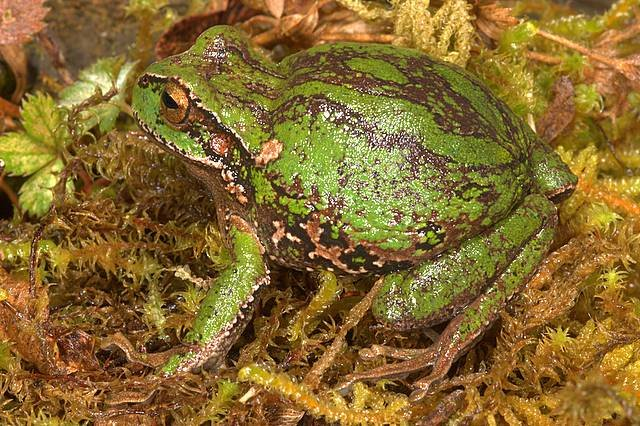
- Gastrotheca excubitor

Scientific classification
- Kingdom: Animalia
- Phylum: Chordata
- Class: Amphibia
- Order: Anura
- Suborder: Neobatrachia
- Family: Amphignathodontidae; Boulenger, 1882

Genera
- Gastrotheca; Flectonotus

= Amphignathodontidae =

Marsupial frogs

Family of amphibians

The marsupial frogs are a disputed family (Amphignathodontidae) in the order Anura. When treated as a separate family, it consists of two genera, Gastrotheca and Flectonotus. The frogs are native to Neotropical America (Central and South America). Under the dominant view, they are treated as part of the family of Hemiphractidae.
