= Evelia Peralta =

Ecuadorian architect born in Argentina

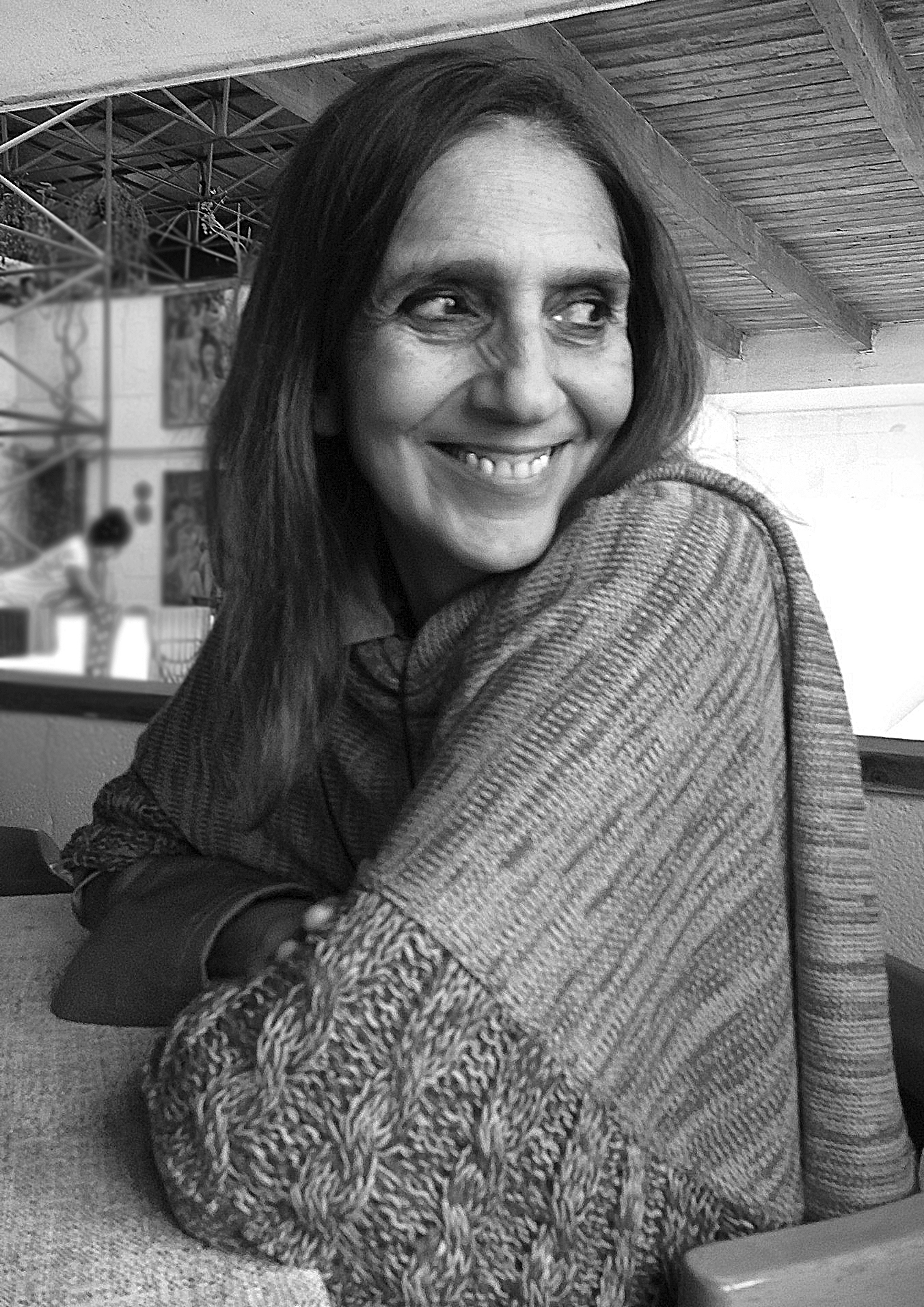
- Born: 1941 (age 84–85); San Miguel de Tucumán
- Occupations: architect and writer
- Partner: Rolando Moya Tasquer

Evelia Peralta (born 1941) is an Argentine-born Ecuadorian architect. She has published several books on contemporary architecture and the architecture of Quito. She directs an architectural magazine titled Trama and she co-founded the Bienal Panamericana de Arquitectura de Quito.

== Life ==
Peralta was born in San Miguel de Tucumán in Argentina in 1941. She studied at the National University of Tucumán and graduated in 1967. She was a director of the architectural journal Trama.

She moved to Ecuador and taught at the Central University of Ecuador in their Architecture faculty. In 1978 the faculty presented a “Comprehensive Workshop, an interdisciplinary proposal” in Guayaquil at the Latin American Congress of Schools and Faculties of Architecture. In the same year she was one of the founders of the Architecture Biennial that takes place in Quito.

In 1994 she was teaching at the Catholic University of Ecuador in Quito. In 2002 she published Quito, cultural heritage of humanity. In 2006 she published "Casas latinoamericanas" (Latin American Houses) which is a guide to recent homes featuring contemporary architecture.

She co-authored a book, with her life partner Rolando Moya Tasquer, about the architecture of Quito, titled Quito: patrimonio cultural de la humanidad. In 2014 the XX Pan-American Architecture Biennial of Quito took place attracting 2,500 people. Peralta was given a diploma and statuette as one of the founders of the Biennial.

In 2024 she and her partner were still running Trama magazine. She says that she feels like a native of Ecuador.
