= Nua Fuentes =

Ecuadorian sociologist, performance artist, LGBT activist (born 1991)

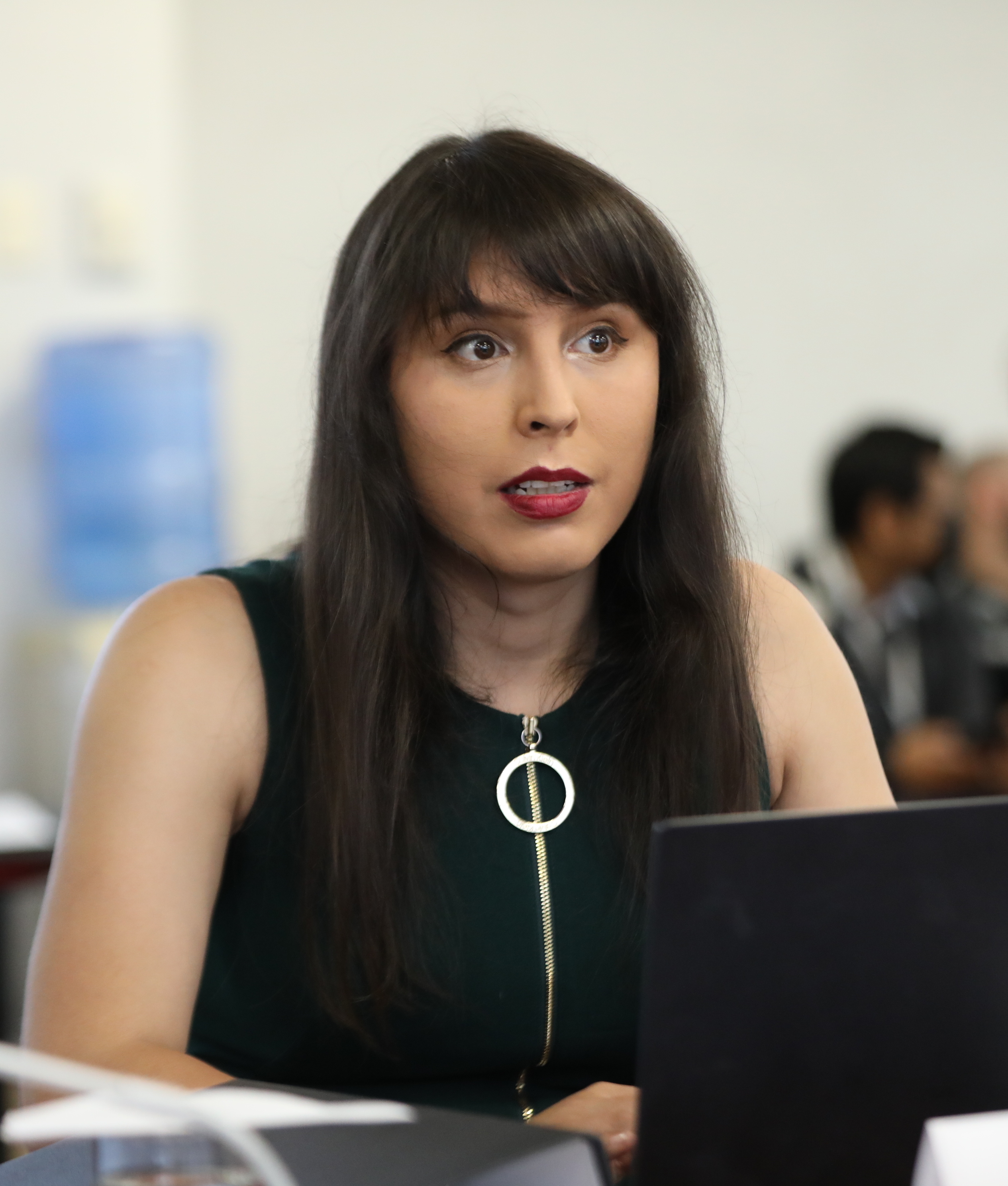
- Fuentes in 2022
- Born: June 28, 1991 (age 35); Quito, Ecuador
- Education: Pontifical Catholic University of Ecuador
- Occupations: LGBTQ activist; sociologist; performance artist

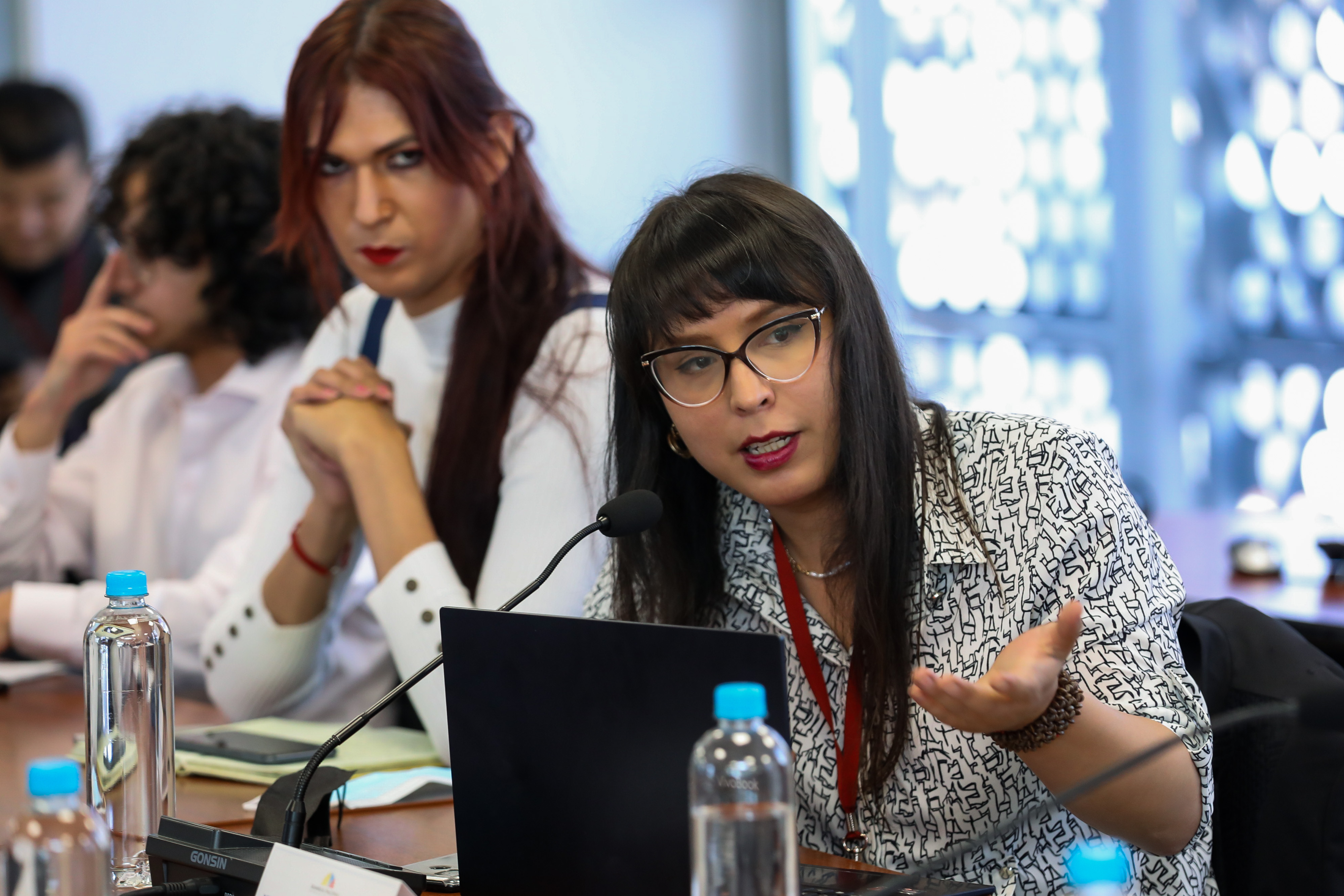
Nua Fuentes in an appearance at the National Assembly in 2022.

Nua Elizabeth Fuentes Aguirre (born in Quito on June 28, 1991) is an Ecuadorian sociologist, performance artist, and transfeminist activist. As an activist, she has been spokesperson for the Trans Pact and president of the Transgender Project foundation, which she has represented at the National Assembly of Ecuador to discuss bills on multiple occasions.

== Biography ==
She completed her higher education at the Pontifical Catholic University of Ecuador, where she obtained a sociology degree. Subsequently, she began a master's degree in social sciences, gender, and development at the Latin American Faculty of Social Sciences (FLACSO).

In 2015, she became a spokesperson for the Trans Pact before the National Assembly of Ecuador during the discussion of the draft Organic Law of the National Service for Identity and Civil Data Management, where she promoted the universal inclusion of a gender field on identity cards instead of the sex field. The final version of the law, which allowed the change of sex to gender with the presence of two witnesses as a requirement, was criticized by Fuentes, who said that imposing additional conditions on the recognition of transgender people made them akin to second-class citizens.

As a performative artist, she created the fanzine Máquina Púrpura, part of the artistic project Las maricas no olvidamos, in 2015, together with Antonella Zamora and Andrea Alejandro Freire.

She was part of the organization of the Ecuadorian version of the SlutWalk (from 2016 to 2019) and the Safe Abortion campaign, in addition to participating in the 2022 National Strike of Ecuador, where she promoted an agenda of sexual dissident rights.
