= Eugenia del Pino =

Ecuadorian biologist (born 1945)

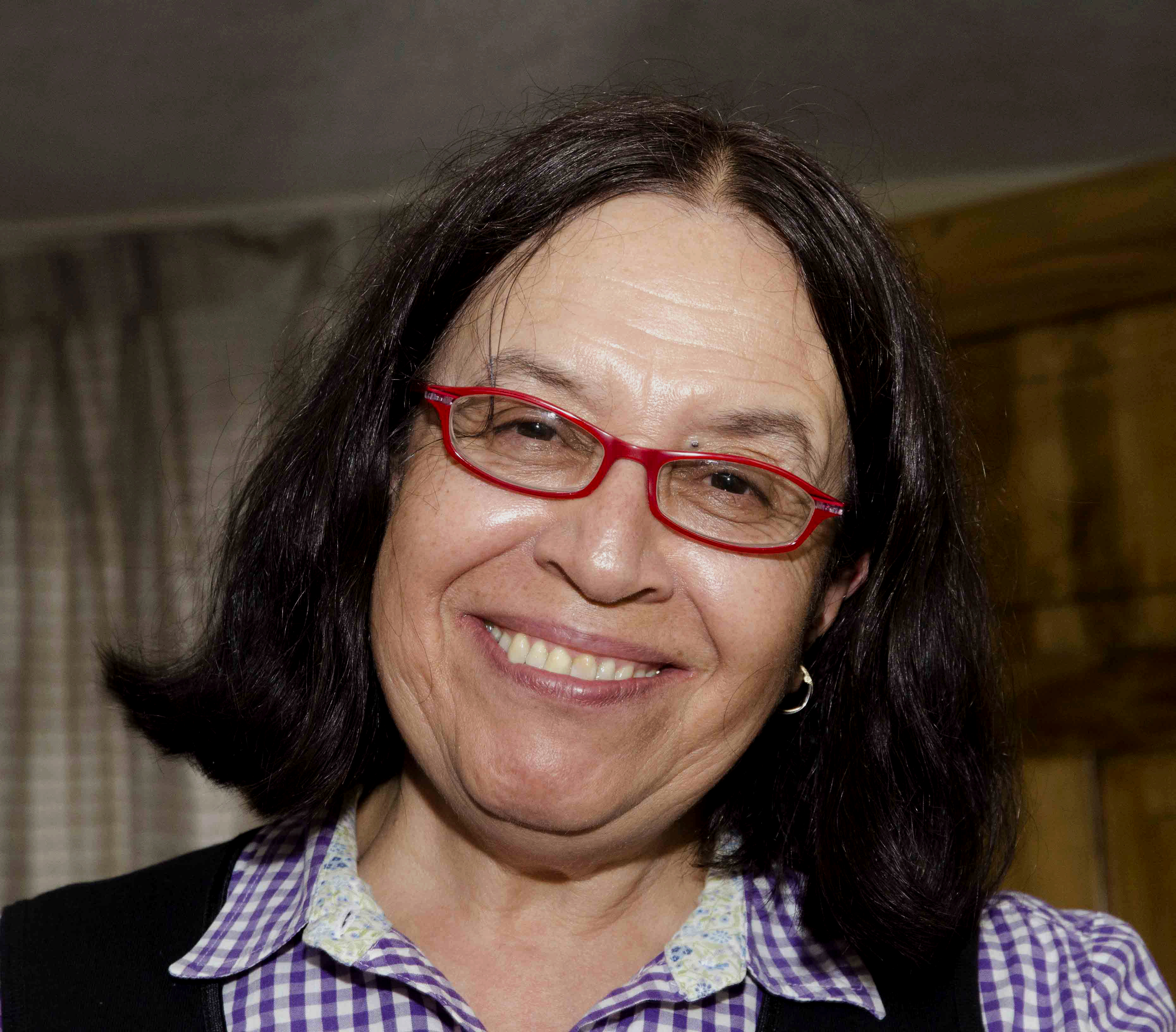
- Born: Eugenia María del Pino Veintimilla; April 19, 1945 (age 81); Quito, Ecuador
- Education: Emory University (PhD); Vassar College (MS); Pontifical Catholic University of Ecuador (Licenciatura).
- Known for: Embryonic development of the marsupial frogs Hemiphractidae and poison arrow frogs Dendrobatidae in comparison with other tropical frogs.
- Awards: L'Oréal-UNESCO Awards for Women in Science "Premio Nacional Eugenio Espejo" awarded by the Government of Ecuador. The 2019 Prize of the Latin American Society for Developmental Biology. The 2022 Developmental Biology-Society for Developmental Biology Lifetime Achievement Award
- Scientific career
- Fields: Developmental biology, Cell biology.
- Workplaces: Pontifical Catholic University of Ecuador (Pontificia Universidad Católica del Ecuador), Quito.
- Doctoral advisor: Asa A. Humphries Jr.

Eugenia María del Pino Veintimilla (born April 19, 1945, Quito, Ecuador) is a developmental biologist at the Pontificia Universidad Catolica del Ecuador (Pontifical Catholic University of Ecuador) in Quito. She was the first Ecuadorian citizen to be elected to the United States National Academy of Sciences (2006). She was awarded the 2019 Prize of the Latin American Society for Developmental Biology for her strong contributions to research in Ecuador, and in general to promoting Developmental Biology in Latin America.

== Biography ==
Del Pino was born and grew up in Quito, Ecuador. She received a licentiate degree from the Pontifical Catholic University of Ecuador (PUCE), Quito 1967. She then studied in the United States of America and holds a M.Sc. Vassar College, 1969, and a Ph.D. Emory University, 1972. Upon completion of the doctorate she returned to Ecuador and joined the faculty the Pontifical Catholic University of Ecuador in Quito.

She was professor of Biology from 1972 to 2013. She is a professor emerita at PUCE since 2013 and engages in the theme of her scientific career, the analysis of frog early development.

She served as Head of Biological Sciences, from 1973–1975.

With a fellowship from the Alexander von Humboldt Foundation she did research at the German Cancer Research Center, Heidelberg, 1984–1985. She was Fulbright Fellow at the laboratory of Prof. Joseph Gall, Carnegie Institution for Science, Department of Embryology in Baltimore, MD, USA, 1990.

Eugenia del Pino is recognized as the premier developmental biologist of Latin America by the Latin American Society for Developmental Biology.

== Research and career ==
Hers is a story of relentless determination and embracing every opportunity that was offered to her by a number of institutions. She was trained to become a High School Teacher at PUCE, at the time when President John F. Kennedy started the Alliance for Progress Program with Latin America. Some equipment and a few professors were sent to Ecuador to help in the training of high school science teachers. One of her professors, Dr. Cándida Acosta, encouraged her to apply for a scholarship to do graduate studies in the United States of America. She received a scholarship from the Latin American Scholarship Program of American Universities (LASPAU) and an international fellowship from the American Association of University Women for her graduate studies in the US. Eugenia obtained a Master of Science from Vassar College and went on to Emory University in Atlanta to obtain a Ph.D with a great mentor, Asa Alan Humphries, Jr. Her dissertation dealt with the role of the egg-jelly on the fertilization of Xenopus laevis. Upon returning to Ecuador in 1972 she became professor of Biology at PUCE, her original University in Quito, and developed her scientific career in Ecuador.

Through her, Developmental Biology blossomed in a most unlikely place: Not having any funds to buy Xenopus laevis, she came across a frog, called Gastrotheca riobambae, in the very gardens of her University. A frog that she developed into a premier system to study the evolution of developmental adaptations. Gastrotheca is a marsupial frog that carries its eggs in a pouch on her back, where they are pushed in by the male with his hindlimbs. This terrestrial form of reproduction solely occurs in the Latin American frogs of the family Hemiphractidae. Out of the intense competition for reproductive sites in the South American rainforest had evolved over 90 species of these frogs, in which the female incubates her embryos inside her body bringing parallelism to mammalian reproduction.

Marsupial frog embryos develop under saline conditions typically found in the body in contrast with the aquatic mode of development found in Xenopus and many other frogs. Traditional frogs and marsupial frogs also differ in how their embryos excrete waste. Free-swimming tadpoles excrete ammonia, which would be toxic if accumulated in close quarters. Eugenia del Pino discovered that marsupial frog embryos excrete urea instead of ammonia. She discovered that addition of urea, which reaches high levels in the pouch, allows eggs to develop outside of the marsupial frog mother. Urea is a nitrogenous waste product that marsupial frog embryos use for water retention under the water stress conditions of the maternal pouch.

Eggs of these frogs are very large, ranging from 3 to 10 mm in diameter in different species, and contain the nutrients needed for development up to metamorphosis. She found that Gastrotheca develops much like a chick embryo on the surface of the yolk. However, instead of a primitive streak there is a circular blastopore surrounded by an embryonic disc. Surprisingly, extension starts only after involution at the blastopore is concluded, demonstrating that these important movements can be dissociated from gastrulation itself. Her analyses revealed extensive modularity in the developmental processes that guide the blastopore closure and notochord elongation in amphibians, features that correlate with reproductive modes and ecological adaptations.

The flat embryos of Gastrotheca extend cranial neural crest cell-streams and branchial arches. Part of the neural crest becomes the "bell gills" that form a rich network of capillaries that surround the embryo in the pouch and exchange gases with the maternal circulation, while still separated by the egg envelope. This is a kind of amphibian version of a placenta without a uterus.

Eugenia del Pino studied many other marsupial frogs and found a Venezuelan one called Flectonotus pygmaeus that has adapted to its large egg by having oocytes that at early stages have up to 3000 meiotic nuclei in a single cell. The many nuclei are gradually lost until in the mature yolky oocyte only a single one remains, forming a single germinal vesicle. Eugenia's discovery of the amazing biological adaptations of marsupial frogs lead to a famous Scientific American Article in 1989.

Her work brought her election to the Latin American Academy of Sciences, The World Academy of Sciences for the Advancement of Science in Developing Countries, and in 2006 she became the first member of the National Academy of Sciences of the USA from Ecuador. She received the L’Oreal-Unesco Prize for Women in Science for Latin America. Eugenia's life shows us how identifying an interesting biological problem and unraveling its mechanism can bring science to any country that allows for creativity.

Eugenia del Pino established an entire school of Biology in Ecuador focused in evolutionary developmental adaptations.

== Teaching and contributions to society ==
Eugenia del Pino introduced the field of Developmental Biology to Ecuador and for a long time the PUCE, her home institution, was the only University in Ecuador with a theoretical and practical undergraduate course in this subject, and her laboratory was the only highly productive Developmental Biology research laboratory. Her research programs were mainly driven by undergraduate students, as no graduate programs were available in Ecuador at the time.

Scientific collaboration was one of her strengths. She partnered with scientists from USA, Japan, UK and Germany. She did so informally, or through programs including the Alexander von Humboldt Foundation and Fulbright fellowships. Her productive scientific career resulted in the training of what is now an active generation of Latin American scientists. Her success results from her dedication and ability to train undergraduates in research. Her publication record is a testimony to her scientific commitment to undergraduate training, as many co-authors were her own undergraduate students. Eugenia del Pino trained over 300 students through both her teaching and research.

Ecuador was one of the few countries in Latin America that did not have an Academy of Sciences. For this reason, Eugenia invited several colleagues to discuss the possibility of establishing the National Academy of Sciences of Ecuador (a.k.a. ACE because of its Spanish acronym). She and her colleagues drafted the statutes and obtained the legal recognition from the Government of Ecuador. In 2013, the Secretariat of Science and Technology of Ecuador recognized the ACE. The six colleagues became the Founding Members of ACE. She served as Vice President of ACE from 2013 to 2016. The ACE membership grew in the following years, and has more than 50 Fellows. ACE provides recognition to its fellows, allows communication between Ecuadorian scientists, and seeks exchanges with institutions at home and abroad.

For about 25 years del Pino contributed to education for conservation of the Galápagos Archipelago. She helped the Charles Darwin Foundation for the Galápagos Islands in the establishment of a program of scholarships for Ecuadorian students in the Galápagos Islands. She served as Vice President of the Charles Darwin Foundation for several years in the 1990s. Later, due to time limitations she withdrew from the Galápagos conservation activities.

Her work has made her a figure of importance in the Science of Ecuador and Latin America.

== Awards ==
- Diploma for the Education and Conservation Efforts in the Galápagos Islands, The World Wildlife Fund. Gland, Switzerland, 1986.
- Medal given by the Charles Darwin Foundation for the Galápagos Islands, 1999
- Founding Member Sociedad Ecuatoriana de Biología.
- Honorary Foreign Member of the American Society of Ichthyologists and Herpetologists, 1996.
- Member of the Latin American Academy of Sciences (ACAL) 1987.
- Fellow of the World Academy of Sciences for the Advancement of Science in Developing Countries, 1989.
- L’OREAL-UNESCO Award for Women in Science for Latin America, 2000.
- Sheth Distinguished International Emory Alumni Award, 2003.
- “Pluma de la Dignidad” Award given by the National Association of Journalists of Ecuador, 2003.
- World Academy of Sciences for the Advancement of Science in Developing Countries Medal Lecture, 2005.
- Eugenio Espejo Medal on the Sciences given by the Council and the Mayor of Quito, 2005.
- Honorary Foreign Member of the American Academy of Arts and Sciences, 2006.
- International Member of the National Academy of Sciences of the United States of America, 2006.
- National Eugenio Espejo Prize (Premio Nacional Eugenio Espejo) awarded by the Government of Ecuador, Quito, 2012.
- Eugenio Espejo Medal on the Sciences given by the Chamber of Commerce of Quito 2012 (Cámara de Comercio de Quito).
- Founding Member of the Academy of Sciences of Ecuador, 2013.
- Latin American Society of Developmental Biology Prize 2019 (Buenos Aires, Argentina).
- The Developmental Biology-Society for Developmental Biology Lifetime Achievement Award 2022 (Vancouver, British Columbia, Canada).
- The Journal Revista Hogar (Ecuador) Recognition as Woman of the Year in the Sciences, 2022 (Guayaquil, Ecuador).
