= Ana Estrella Santos =

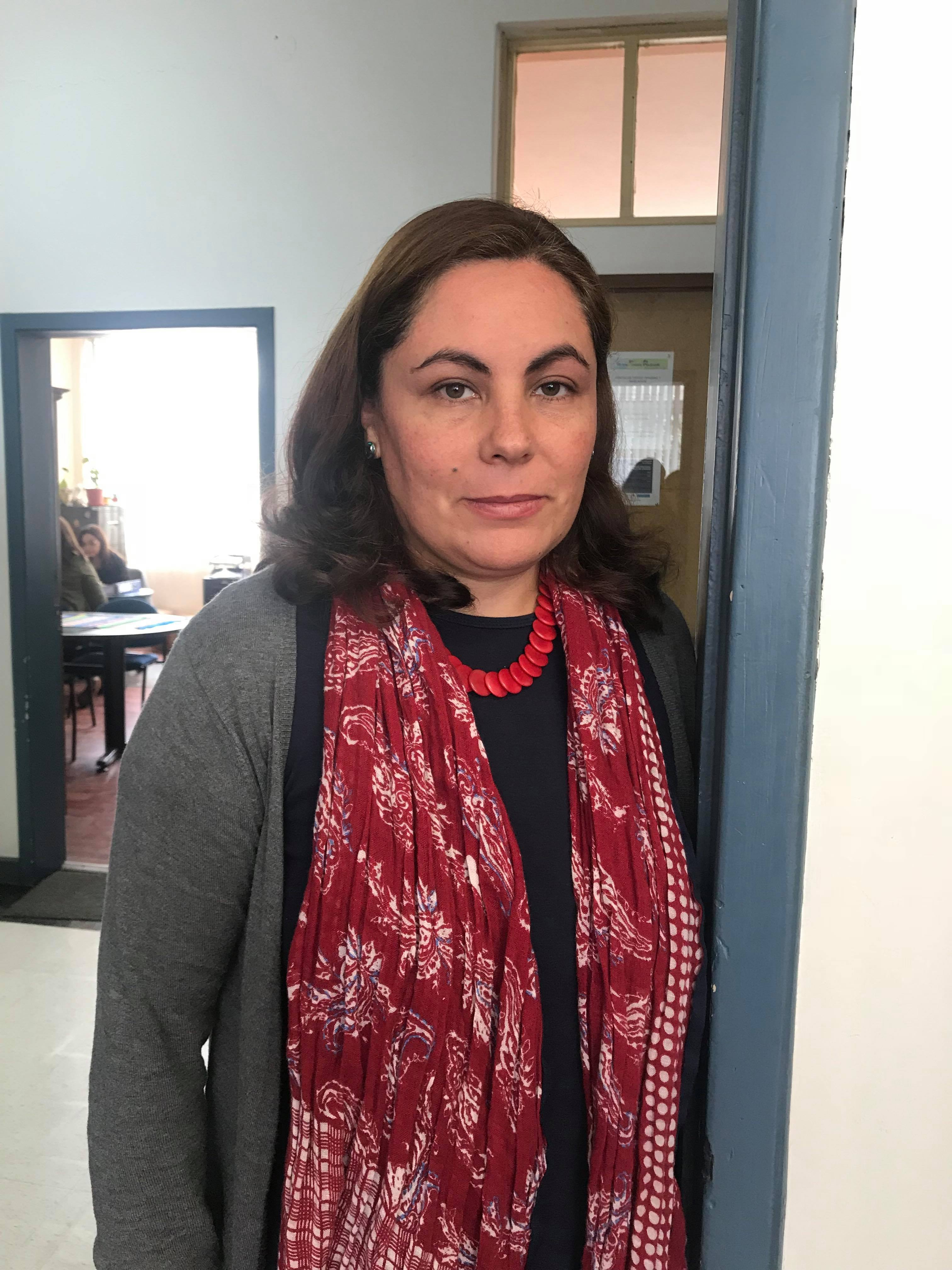
- Ana Estrella Santos in 2018
- Born: Quito, Ecuador
- Occupations: professor, dialectologist, writer
- Awards: Aurelio Espinosa Pólit prize

Academic background
- Education: National University of Distance Education

Academic work
- Institutions: Universidad San Francisco de Quito; Pontifical Catholic University of Ecuador
- Notable works: La curiosidad mató al alemán y otros centos

Ana Estrella Santos (born in Quito) is an Ecuadorian dialectologist and writer. She is a professor at the Pontifical Catholic University of Ecuador (PUCE) in Quito. Estrella received the Aurelio Espinosa Pólit prize in 2013.

== Biography ==
Estrella obtained a doctorate in Hispanic Philology and General Linguistics at the National University of Distance Education in Madrid. Since 1998, she has been a researcher and later became the director of the Linguistic Atlas of Ecuador project at the PUCE, a research project in the development phase that aims to map the way Ecuadorians speak solely in the Spanish language. She was a professor at the Universidad San Francisco de Quito before becoming a professor at the Faculty of Communication, Linguistics and Literature of the PUCE, and director of the School of Literature at PUCE.

Estrella received the Aurelio Espinosa Pólit National Literature Prize in 2013, awarded by PUCE, for her book La curiosidad mató al alemán, (Curiosity Killed the German), where she highlighted the role of communication and vindicated the importance of freedom of expression that can be affected by the law in force in the country of Ecuador. She has also taken part in the jury that awards these awards. She published two previous books; this is her first of short stories.

== Selected works ==
=== Articles on communication and linguistics ===
- "Análisis del lenguaje políticamente correcto en Ecuador: el caso de ‘centros de rehabilitación’ y de ‘personas privadas de su libertad’"
- "El léxico de Pichincha y Guayas : un estudio comparativo" (2009)
- "La curiosidad mató al alemán y otros cuentos" (2013)
- "El uso del verbo en el habla de Quito"
- "¡Full lindo!: Acerca del uso de full en el habla de Ecuador"
- "Verdadera Vida y Milagros de un Figurón Sebruno...: un pasquín inédito de principios del siglo XIX"

=== Articles in collaboration with other researchers ===
- "Is prosodic development correlated with grammatical and lexical development? Evidence from emerging intonation in Catalan and Spanish"
- "Politeness and prosody: Interaction of prosody in the requests with ‘‘dar’’as a benefactive in Ecuadorian Andean Spanish", Phonetics and Phonology in Iberia 2007 Conference (PaPI), Braga (Portugal).
- "Early International Development in Spanish: A Case Study", 13th Hispanic Linguistics Symposium, pp. 203–213.
