= Vicente Cabrera Funes =

Ecuadorian writer

- Born: Vicente Cabrera Funes
- Citizenship: Ecuador
- Education: University of Massachusetts Amherst; Pontificia Universidad Católica del Ecuador
- Occupations: Writer and Professor
- Writing career
- Genre: Novel
- Notable awards: UMM Faculty Distinguished Research Award
- Movement: Latin American literature

Vicente Cabrera Funes (1944 – 6 July 2014) was a Professor of Spanish at the University of Minnesota Morris and Ecuadorian writer in Morris, Minnesota.

Cabrera received his B.A. from Pontifical Catholic University of Ecuador - Quito, and his M.A. and Ph.D. from the University of Massachusetts.

== Selected works ==
Year of Publication	Literary work	Genre
2013	El suicidio de los inocentes	Novel
2008	Dónde más si no en el Paraíso	Novel
2005	Los malditos amantes de Carolina	Novel
2003	La sombra del espía	Novel
2003	El hortelano de Ulba, o, Sonia, El soldador y El hortelano	Novel
1984	La noche del té; El gabán	Novel
1983	Juan Benet	Novel
1977-80	Journal of Spanish studies . Editor	Essay
1978	Novela española contemporánea: Cela, Delibes, Romero y Hernández, Coauthor	Essay
1975	Tres poetas a la luz de la metáfora: Salinas, Aleixandre y Guillén, Author	Essay
1972	La nueva ficción hispanoamericana: a través de M.A. Asturias y G. Garica Márquez, Coauthor	Essay
