= Zonia Palán Tamayo =

Ecuadorian economist (1954–2003)

- Born: July 24, 1954; Ambato, Ecuador
- Died: June 28, 2003 (aged 48)

Academic background
- Education: Pontificia Universidad Católica del Ecuador; Latin American Faculty of Social Sciences

Academic work
- Discipline: economics
- Institutions: Pontifical Catholic University of Ecuador
- Notable works: Employment and Working Conditions in the Ecuadorian Flower Industry

Zonia Palán Tamayo (July 24, 1954 – June 28, 2003) was an Ecuadorian economist. She taught at the Pontifical Catholic University of Ecuador. A bust to remember her championing of women's rights was unveiled in 2005.

== Life ==
Tamayo was born in 1954. She studied economics at the Faculty of Economics at the Pontificia Universidad Católica del Ecuador. She did a postgraduate in Mexico and a master's degree from the Latin American Faculty of Social Sciences (FLACSO).

She was a professor at the Catholic University of Ecuador. She does not appear to have joined a political party, but she was consulted by union leaders for her advice. She was a supporter of the least powerful in society and she was known to admire a party of the left. She would bring pressure to bear on authority using International agreements, that had been made at for instance the Andean Parliament. Her work led to improvements in the State Police Constitution and she was a noted supporter of trade unions.

In 1999 she published Employment and Working Conditions in the Ecuadorian Flower Industry.

== Death and legacy ==
Tamayo died in 2003.

In 2005, a bust was unveiled to remember Zonia Palán because of her defense of women's labour rights and of encouraging gender equality. The bust is on the roundabout where Los Atis meets Avenue Víctor Hugo. Councilors Sandy Avalos and Carolina Garcés were at the unveiling as well as María Elena Montero of the Foundation for Legal Support and Training for Women, Children and Adolescents (FALYC-MNA) and Rebeca Díaz from the Tungurahua Women's Coordinator.
