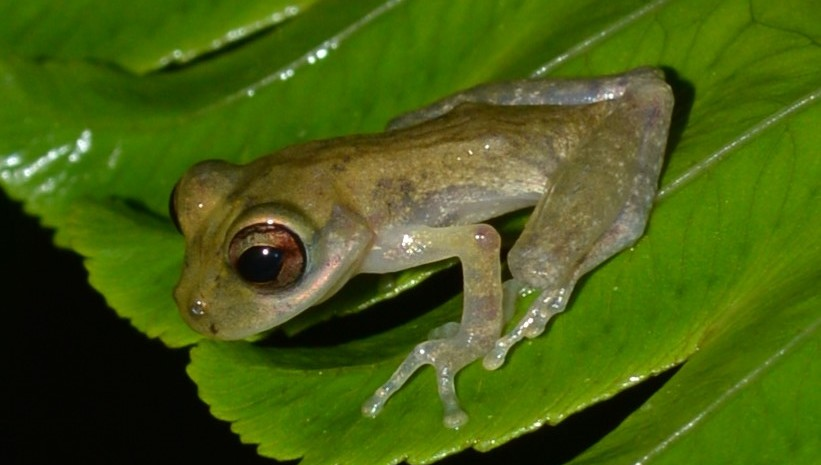
- F. fitzgeraldi in Trinidad and Tobago

Conservation status
- Least Concern (IUCN 3.1)

Scientific classification
- Kingdom: Animalia
- Phylum: Chordata
- Class: Amphibia
- Order: Anura
- Family: Hemiphractidae
- Genus: Flectonotus
- Species: F. fitzgeraldi

Binomial name
- Flectonotus fitzgeraldi (Parker, 1934)

Synonyms
- Gastrotheca fitzgeraldi Parker, 1934; Nototheca fitzgeraldi Bokermann, 1950 Flectonotus fitzgeraldi Bokermann, 1966

= Mount Tucuche tree frog =

Species of amphibian

The Mount Tucuche tree frog (Flectonotus fitzgeraldi), also known commonly as the Dwarf marsupial frog, is a species of tree frog in the family Hemiphractidae. It is found on Trinidad, Tobago and in the Venezuelan states of Sucre and Monagas.

== Taxonomy ==
The first description of Flectonotus fitzgeraldi was published by Hampton Wildman Parker in 1934, under the name Gastrotheca fitzgeraldi. Werner C.A. Bokermann moved the species from Gastrotheca to Nototheca (Note: A renaming of the genus Coelonotus that had been erected by Alípio de Miranda-Ribeiro in 1920, with the justification being that Coelonotus had already been used by Wilhelm Peters in 1855; the Coelonotus of Peters is itself not in use due to being a junior synonym of Microphis, erected in 1853 by Johann Jakob Kaup.) in 1950, and then from there to Flectonotus in 1966.

== Description ==
F. fitzgeraldi snout–vent length is typically in the range of 16.1–18.3 mm (0.63–0.72 in) for males and 19.6–23.0 mm (0.77–0.91 in) for females, about 25.7% and 26.6% smaller, respectively, than the typical snout–vent lengths of Flectonotus pygmaeus, the only other species of Flectonotus. F. fitzgeraldi have rounded snouts, smooth tarsi and smooth backs.

Females carry their eggs in a dorsal pouch, and the tadpoles have beaks with only small amounts of keratin and no denticles, and they hatch at an advanced stage of development.

== Distribution and habitat ==
F. fitzgeraldi is endemic to Trinidad and Tobago and the Venezuelan states of Sucre and Monagas. In Trinidad it can be found in the Northern Range, the southeast and down the centre-line of the island. In Tobago it can be found in the Main Ridge Forest Reserve. In Venezuela it can be found on the Paria Peninsula of Sucre, in area around the La Cernatana and Campeare mountains, also of Sucre, and in the Turimiquire Massif region on the border of Sucre and Monagas. It is an arboreal species occurring in various microhabitats of humid montane forest such as the leaf bases of bromeliads and aroids and in bushes, and it can be found at elevations of up to 1,000 m (3,300 ft). It is threatened by habitat loss. The species was formerly listed as endangered on the IUCN Red List.

Scientists have reported this species in one protected area, Parque Nacional Peninsula de Paria.

== Sources ==
- Duellman, William E.; Gray, Peter (December 1983). "Developmental Biology and Systematics of the Egg-Brooding Hylid Frogs, Genera Flectonotus and Fritziana". Herpetologica. 39 (4). Herpetologists' League: 333–359. JSTOR 3892530 – via JSTOR.
