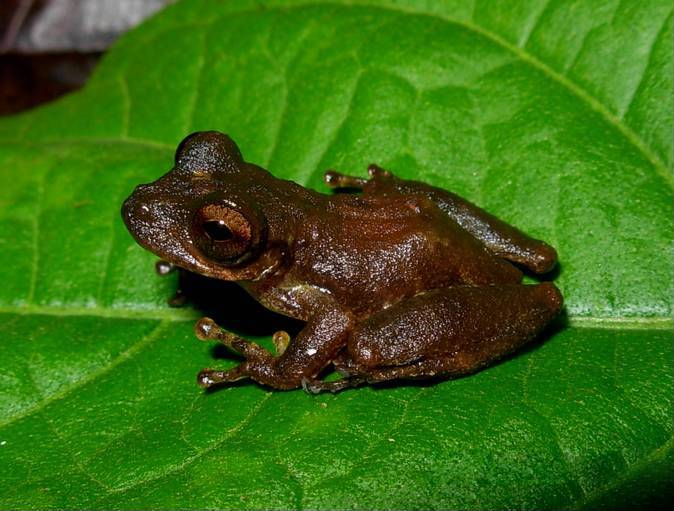

Conservation status
- Least Concern (IUCN 3.1)

Scientific classification
- Kingdom: Animalia
- Phylum: Chordata
- Class: Amphibia
- Order: Anura
- Family: Hemiphractidae
- Genus: Flectonotus
- Species: F. pygmaeus

Binomial name
- Flectonotus pygmaeus (Boettger, 1893)

Synonyms
- Nototrema pygmaeum Boettger, 1893; Flectonotus pygmaeus Miranda-Ribeiro, 1926 Gastrotheca pygmaeum Noble, 1931 Nototheca pygmaeum Bokermann, 1950

= Flectonotus pygmaeus =

Species of frog

Flectonotus pygmaeus (also known as: Puerto Cabello treefrog, Spanish: ranita marsupial pigmea) is a species of frog in the family Hemiphractidae. It is found in mountainous regions of northwest Venezuela and northeast Colombia.

== Taxonomy ==
The first description of the species was published by Oskar Boettger in 1893, under the name Nototrema pygmaeum. Already in 1926 did Alípio de Miranda-Ribeiro suggest the name Flectonotus pygmaeus, but it wasn't until 1966, after a few decades of the genus names and classifications of the species and its close relatives being shuffled, that Werner C.A. Bokermann would publish the modern the name Flectonotus pygmaeus with Flectonotus referring to a genus containing F.pygmaeus and F.fitzgeraldi.

== Description ==
F. pygmaeus snout–vent length is typically in the range of 22–24.2 mm (0.87–0.95 in) for males and 27.4–30.6 mm (1.08–1.20 in) for females, about 34.6% and 36.2% larger, respectively, than the typical snout–vent lengths of Flectonotus fitzgeraldi. F. pygmaeus have smooth tarsi and backs, and usually have a rounded snout.

== Distribution and habitat ==
This nocturnal frog is found on the Mérida Andes and Venezuelan Coastal Range in Venezuela and on adjacent eastern slopes of the northern Cordillera Oriental in Colombia. Its natural habitat is humid pre-montane forest. It is strongly associated with bromeliads, and can survive in degraded forest if bromeliads are present. It is threatened by deforestation, and, locally, by the collection of bromeliads. It can be found at elevations ranging from sea level to 1,600 m (5,200 ft).

Scientists have seen this frog in a protected place: Parque Nacional da Serra dos Órgãos, which is inside Área de Proteção Ambiental da Região Serrana de Petropolis.

== Threats ==
The IUCN classifies this species as least concern of extinction. In some areas, some of the frogs may suffer from habitat loss associated with urbanization, agriculture, logging, and cattle ranching. Commercial bromeliad collection may interfere with breeding. Scientists have detected the dangerous fungus Batrachochytrium dendrobatidis on other frogs in the area, so the disease chytridiomycosis pose some threat as well.

== Sources ==
- Duellman, William E.; Gray, Peter (December 1983). "Developmental Biology and Systematics of the Egg-Brooding Hylid Frogs, Genera Flectonotus and Fritziana". Herpetologica. 39 (4). Herpetologists' League: 333–359. JSTOR 3892530 – via JSTOR.
