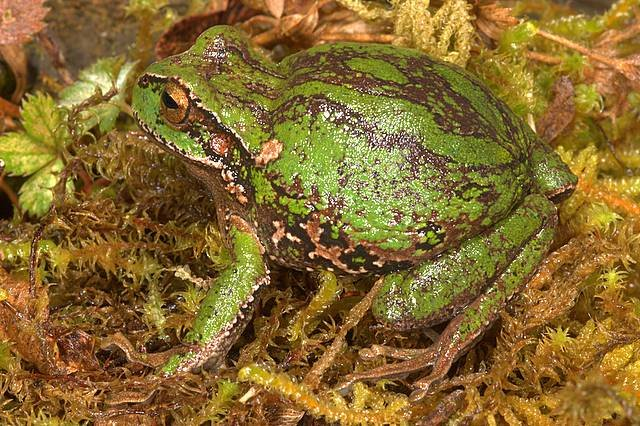

Conservation status
- Vulnerable (IUCN 3.1)

Scientific classification
- Kingdom: Animalia
- Phylum: Chordata
- Class: Amphibia
- Order: Anura
- Family: Hemiphractidae
- Genus: Gastrotheca
- Species: G. excubitor

Binomial name
- Gastrotheca excubitor Duellman and Fritts, 1972

= Gastrotheca excubitor =

Species of frog

Gastrotheca excubitor is a species of frog in the family Hemiphractidae. It is endemic to southern Peru and occurs in the Amazonian slopes and crests of the Cordillera Oriental in the Cusco Region; records from the Cajamarca Region are likely erroneous. It is likely to include cryptic species. Common name Abra Acanacu marsupial frog has been coined for it.

== Description ==
Adult males measure 21–40 mm (0.8–1.6 in) and adult females 33–41 mm (1.3–1.6 in) in snout–vent length. The snout is rounded. The tympanum is vertically ovoid; the supra-tympanic fold is weakly developed and granular. The fingers have no webbing whereas the toes have basal webbing; the discs are almost round. Skin is smooth dorsally. The dorsum is tan, gray, or green and has dark brown or green markings consisting of a broad inter-orbita1 bar that is connected to pair of broad, longitudinal stripes; the latter are partially or completely merged in some specimens. The flanks are bronze-tan to bluish green and have dark brown and/or cream spots. The venter is tan. The iris is copper with fine black reticulations. The vocal sac in calling males is dark gray.

Females have a single median brood pouch in which the eggs are brooded until they hatch into froglets. The average fecundity is about 20 eggs. The eggs are about 6 mm in diameter.

== Habitat and conservation ==
Gastrotheca excubitor is a terrestrial frogs inhabiting humid Puna grassland with mosses and bunchgrass, above the treeline (3,080–4,080 m (10,100–13,390 ft) above sea level). It can also be found in low intensity farmed areas. They are typically found beneath stones during the day, or walking about in deep moss. Males call at night.

This species is threatened by habitat loss caused by agriculture, burning of grasslands, and the development of tourism infrastructure. The fungus Batrachochytrium dendrobatidis has been detected in the species, but it appears resistant to it. Scientists attribute this to beneficial bacteria living on the frog's skin. Gastrotheca excubitor is known from several protected areas, including the Manú National Park and Machu Picchu Historical Sanctuary.
