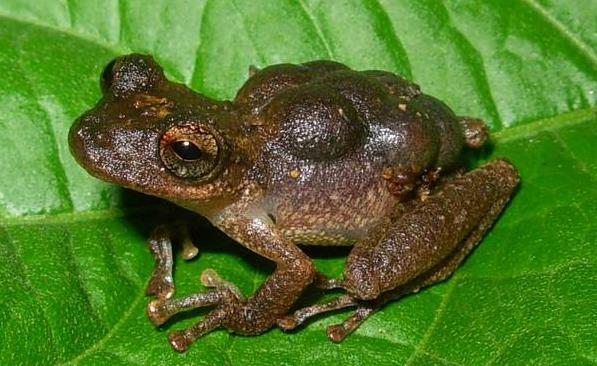
- Flectonotus pygmaeus

Scientific classification
- Domain: Eukaryota
- Kingdom: Animalia
- Phylum: Chordata
- Class: Amphibia
- Order: Anura
- Family: Hemiphractidae
- Genus: Flectonotus; Miranda-Ribeiro, 1920

Type species
- Nototrema pygmaeum Boettger, 1893

Species
- 2 species (see text)

= Flectonotus =

Genus of amphibians

Flectonotus is a genus of frogs of the family Hemiphractidae. They are found on the Andes of northeastern Colombia and adjacent Venezuela as well as in Trinidad and Tobago.

== Taxonomy ==
The genus has been considered to include Fritziana, but the latter genus was recognized again in 2011. The former Flectonotus consisted of two geographically disjunctive components, one from northern South America (=Flectonotus, as understood today) and the other from southeastern Brazil (now Fritziana). The distinctiveness of these taxa is now well established and based on both molecular, behavioural, and morphological characters.

== Species ==
There are two Flectonotus species:

- Flectonotus fitzgeraldi (Parker, 1934)
- Flectonotus pygmaeus (Boettger, 1893)
