= Pontifical Catholic University of Ecuador =

Ecuatorian university

Coordinates: 0°12′36″S 78°29′29″W

- Pontificia Universidad Católica del Ecuador
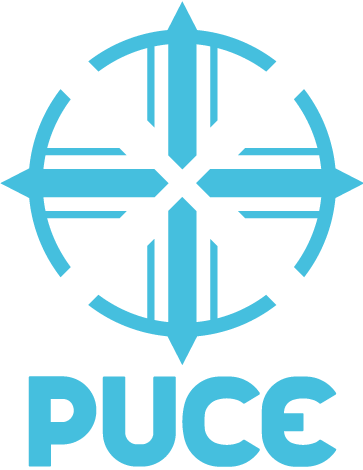
- Motto: Seréis mis testigos You will be my witnesses
- Type: Private
- Established: 1946; 80 years ago
- Affiliations: Catholic, Jesuit
- Academic affiliations: AUSJAL, CEUPA, FIUC, IAU
- Budget: US$146,124,377 (2025)
- Chancellor: Alfredo Espinoza Mateus, SDB, Archbishop of Quito
- Vice-Chancellor: Daniel de Ycaza, S.J.
- Rector: Dr. Carlos Ignacio Man Ging Villanueva, PhD, S.J.
- Location: Quito, Pichincha Province, Ecuador
- Campus: Urban
- Website: www.puce.edu.ec

The Pontificia Universidad Católica del Ecuador (PUCE) (English: Pontifical Catholic University of Ecuador) is a Pontifical Catholic university founded in 1946 in Quito, Ecuador.

== History ==
The university opened in the fall of 1946, with Carlos María de la Torre, archbishop of Quito, officiating. Aurelio Espinosa Pólit of the Society of Jesus (Jesuits) was the first rector. That fall there were 54 students and jurisprudence was the single faculty.

In 2005 in Ambato a bust was unveiled to Zonia Palán Tamayo who had taught economics at the university and was notable in championing women's and union rights.

Pope Francis visited the campus of PUCE on his trip to South America in July 2015.

== Location ==
The principal campus of the university is in Quito. Other campuses are in Ambato (established in 1982), Esmeraldas (1981), Ibarra (1976), Santo Domingo de los Colorados (1996), and a regional campus in the province of Manabí (1993). The campus in Cuenca later became the Universidad del Azuay. All branches follow the National System PUCE.

== Departments ==
- Faculty of Communication, Linguistics, and Literature
- Faculty of Management, Accounting, Administration
- Faculty of Philosophy, Theology
- Faculty of Humanities
- Faculty of Natural Sciences
- Faculty of Education Sciences
- College of Engineering
- School of Law
- School of Medicine
- School of Nursing
- School of Psychology
- School of Bioanalysis
- School of Economics
- School of Architecture, Design, Art
- School of Social Work

=== Faculty of Communication, Linguistics, and Literature (FCLL) ===
There are four careers that make up the FCLL: Communication, Literature, Linguistics, and Applied Languages. In addition, the Languages Center welcomes regular students of the university and is open to the community.

=== Espinosa Pólit award for Literature at PUCE ===
Aurelio Espinosa Pólit, the most prestigious awards for writers and authors is the Espinosa Pólit award for Literarute at PUCE which is one of the biggest awards in Ecuador and is given once a year by a voting panel from Catholica University, and is overseen by Vicente Robalino, catedrático de la PUCE, Pontificia Universidad Católica del Ecuador. Taking place every year in Quito at PUCE.

Aurelio Espinosa Pólit was born in Quito on the 11th of July 1894 and is best remembered as one of the best Ecuadorian writer's, poet's, literary critic's and a university professor at PUCE. He co-founded the Pontifical Catholic University of Ecuador, and he founded the Aurelio Espinosa Polit Museum and Library in Quito.

=== Cultural Center ===
The P.U.C.E. Cultural Center on the campus in Quito and holds numerous exhibits year round with artists from all over the world.

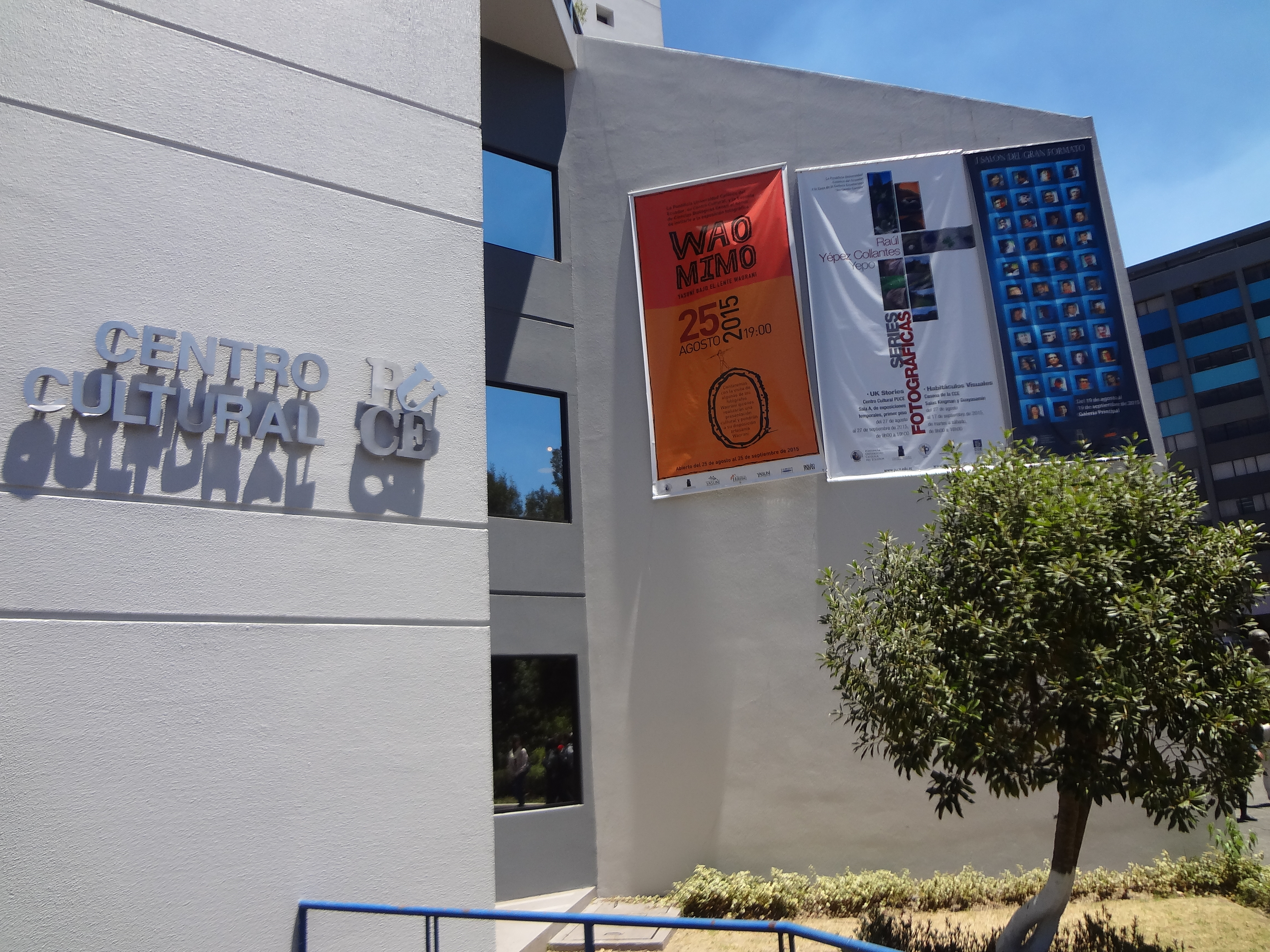

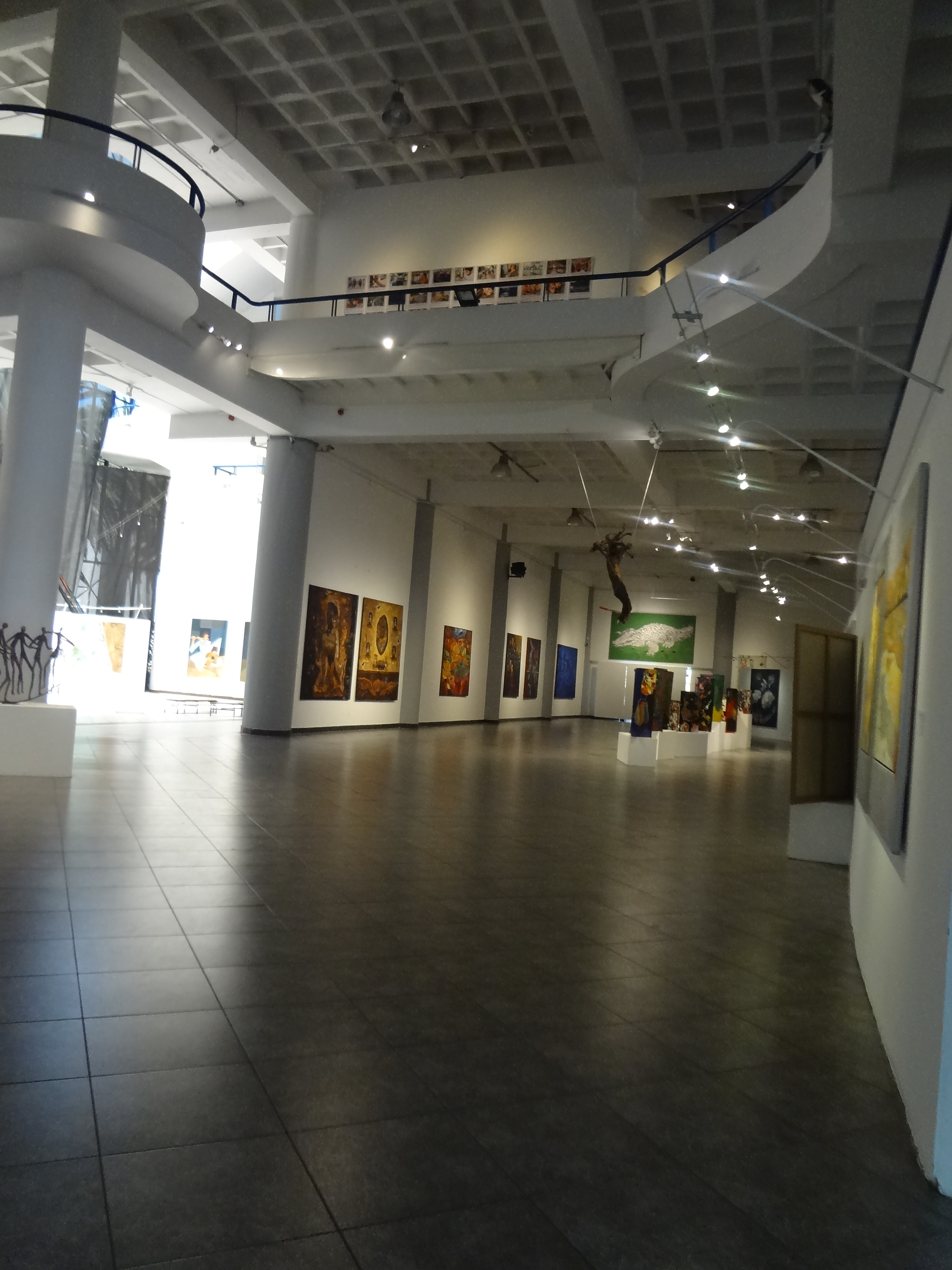

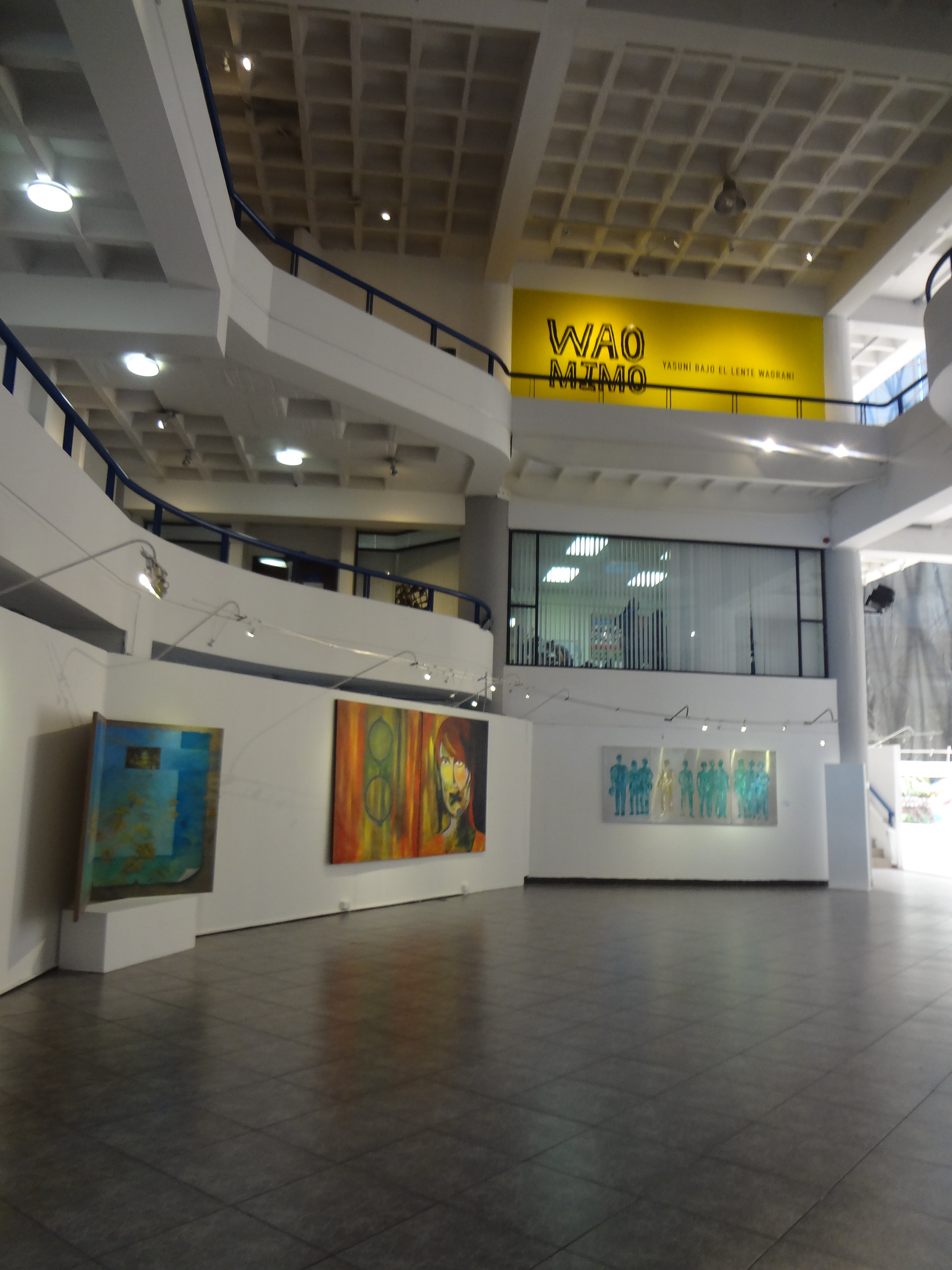

== Notable people ==
=== Alumni ===
- Fabian Alarcon
- Alvaro Aleman
- Enrique Ayala Mora
- Vicente Cabrera Funes
- Ivan Carvajal
- Catalina Ontaneda, Minister for Sport.
- Eugenia del Pino
- Oswaldo Hurtado Larrea
- Jamil Mahuad Witt
- Mauricio Rodas
- Hernan Rodriguez Castelo
- Jorge Salvador Lara
- Karina Subía
- Julio Cesar Trujillo Vasquez
- Pedro Velasco

=== Faculty ===
- Ana Estrella Santos

== Pope Francis visit in July, 2015 ==
Pope Francis was in Quito for a few days in July 2015. During his visit in Quito, Pope Francis was the campus of P.U.C.E on the afternoon of the 7th of July 2015 and spoke to the university. and was able to speak to many thousands on different areas. The visit also went with a tour of the Historic Centre of Quito.

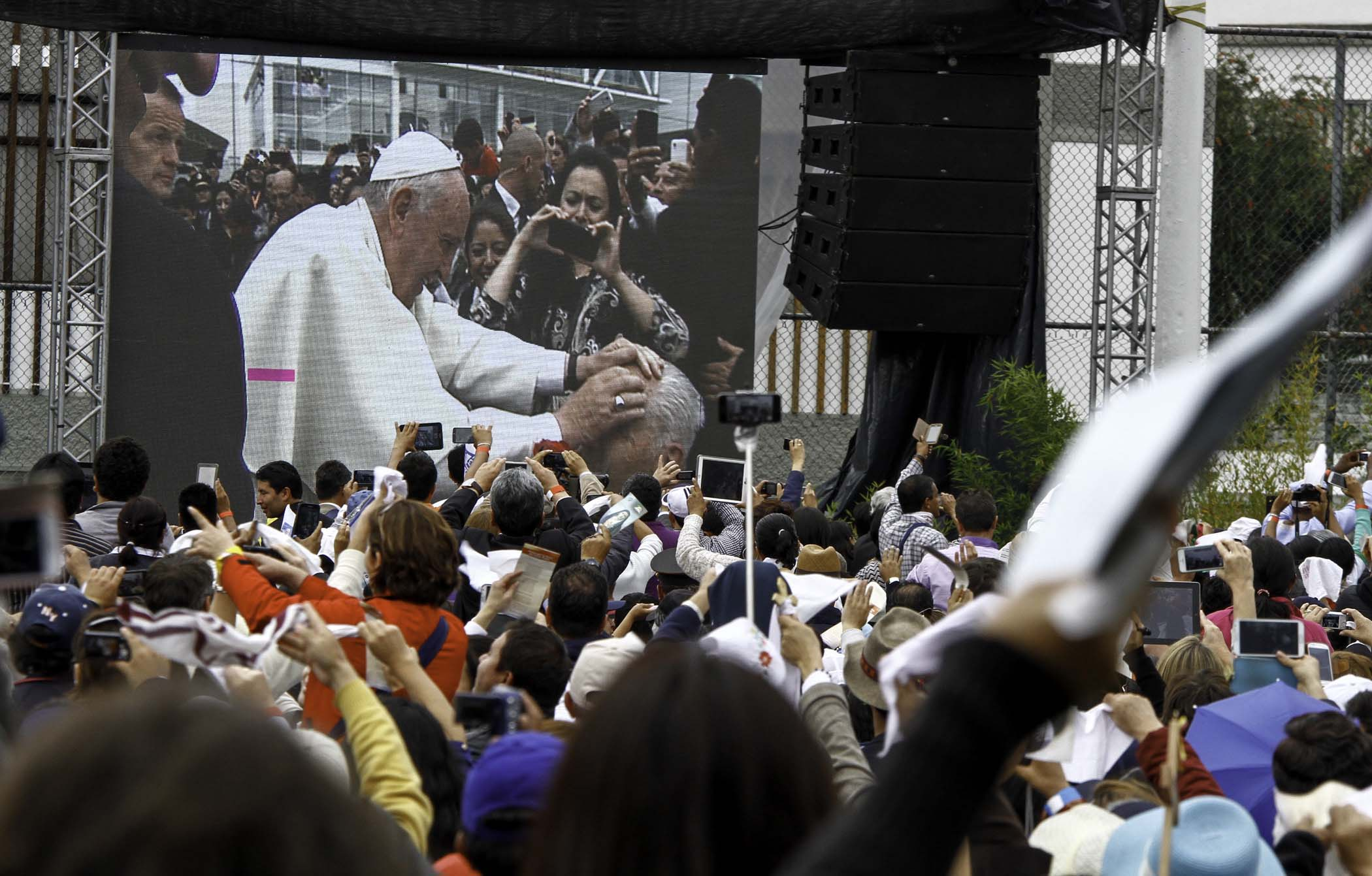

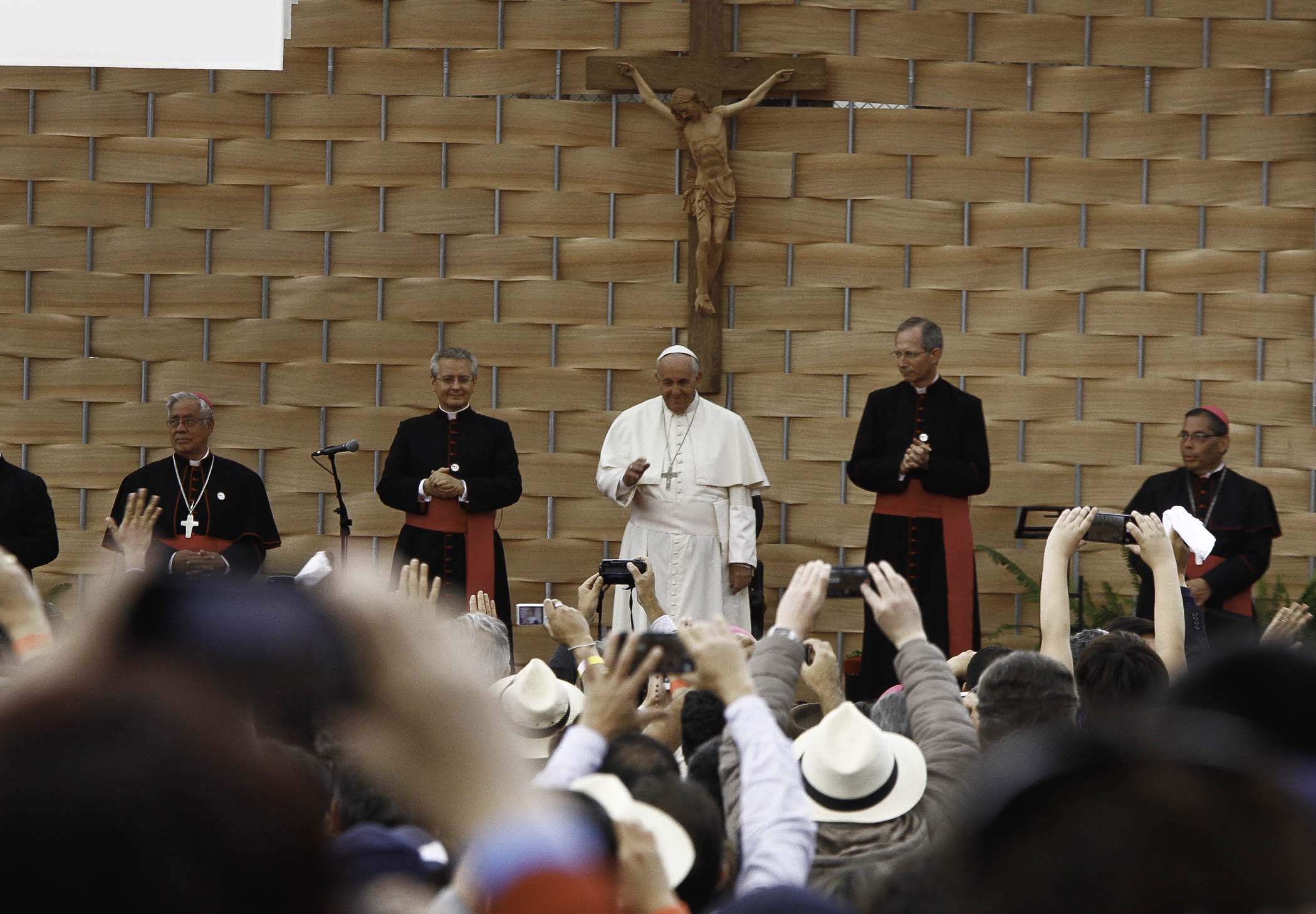

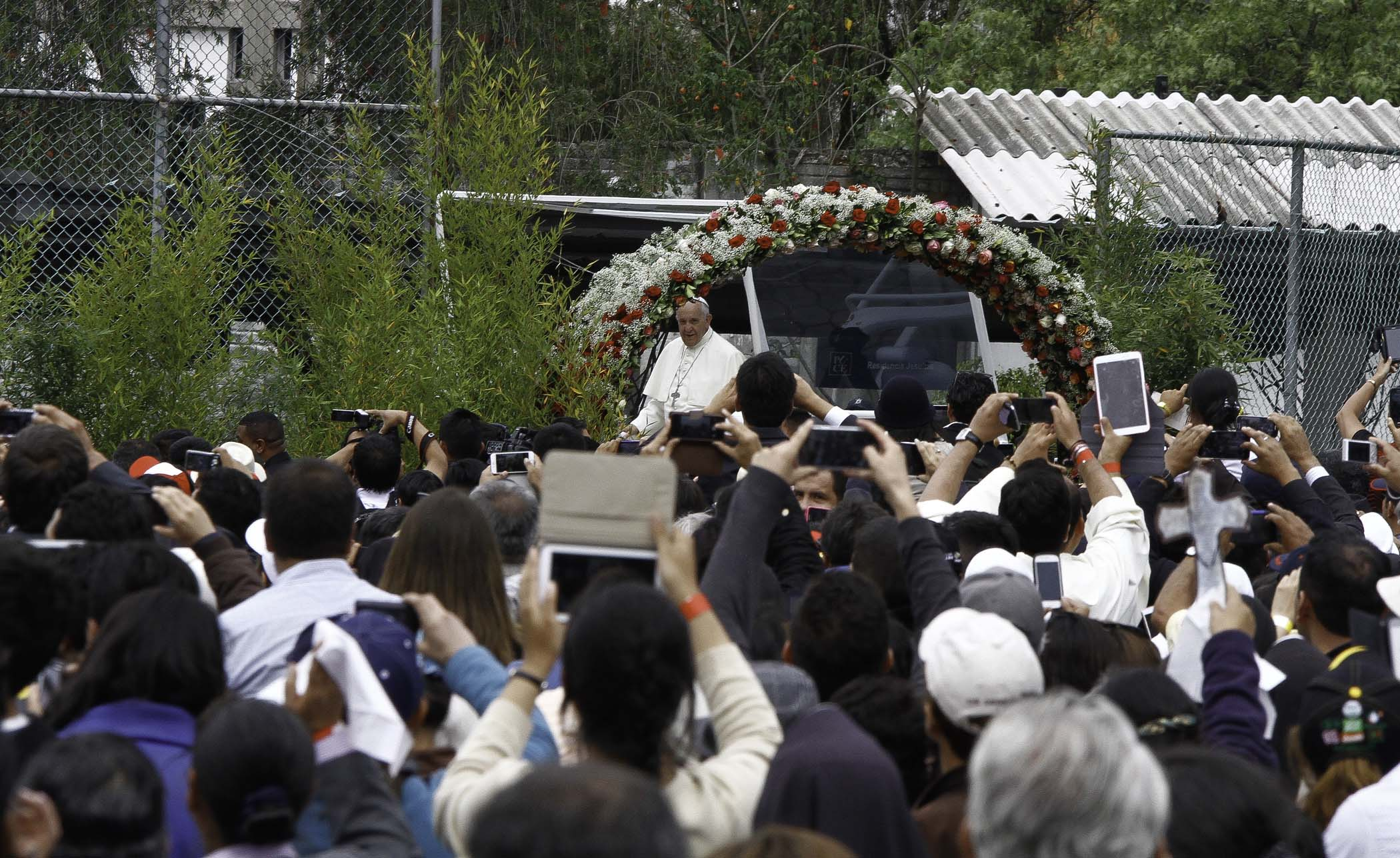

== Gallery ==
=== Quito campus ===
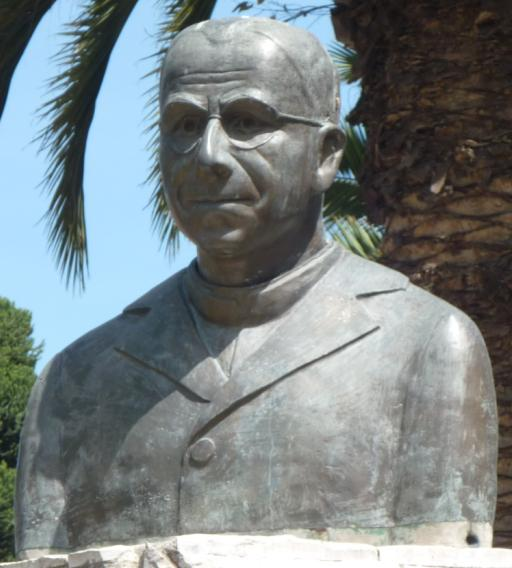
Aurelio Espinoza Polit

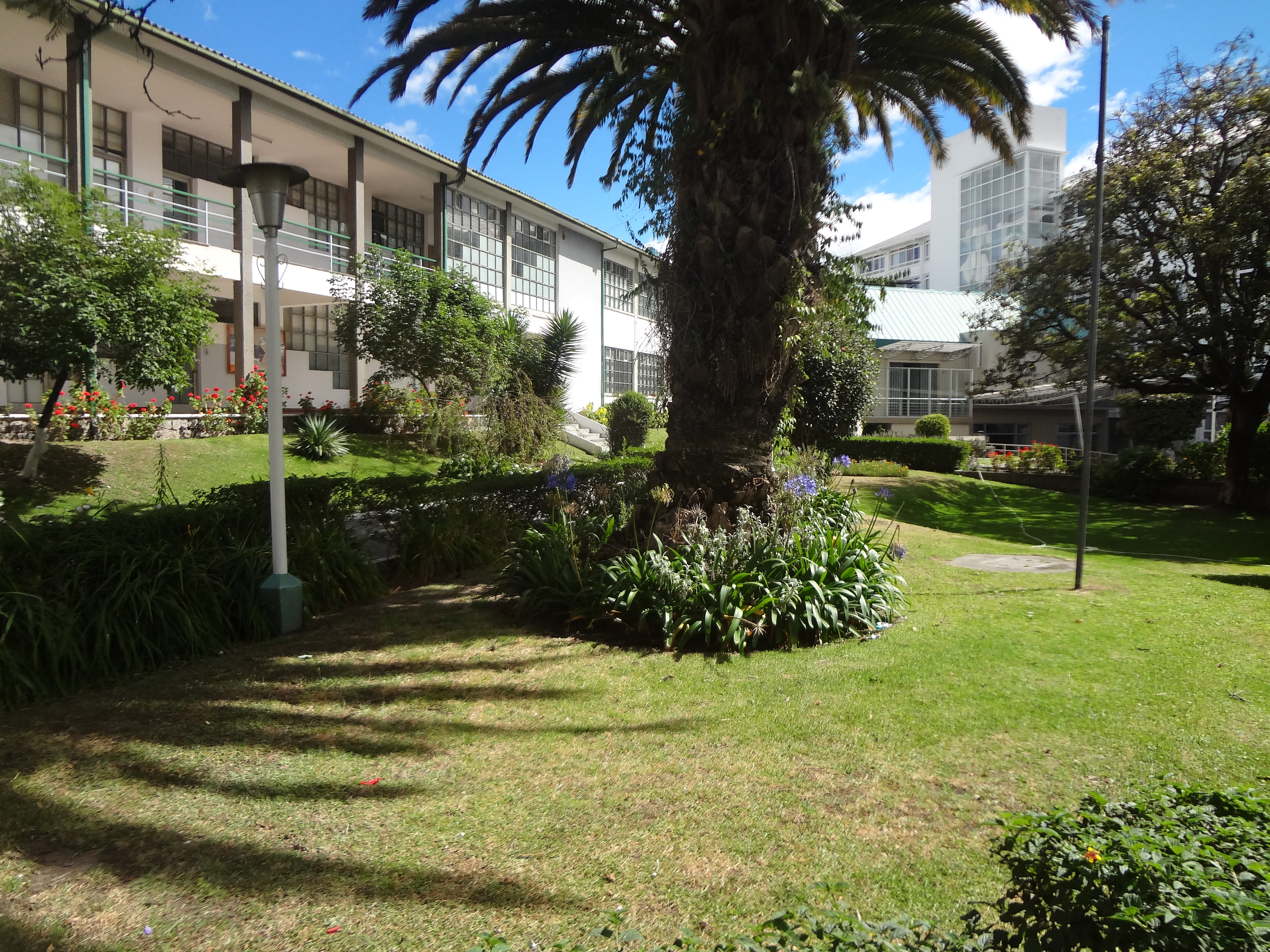

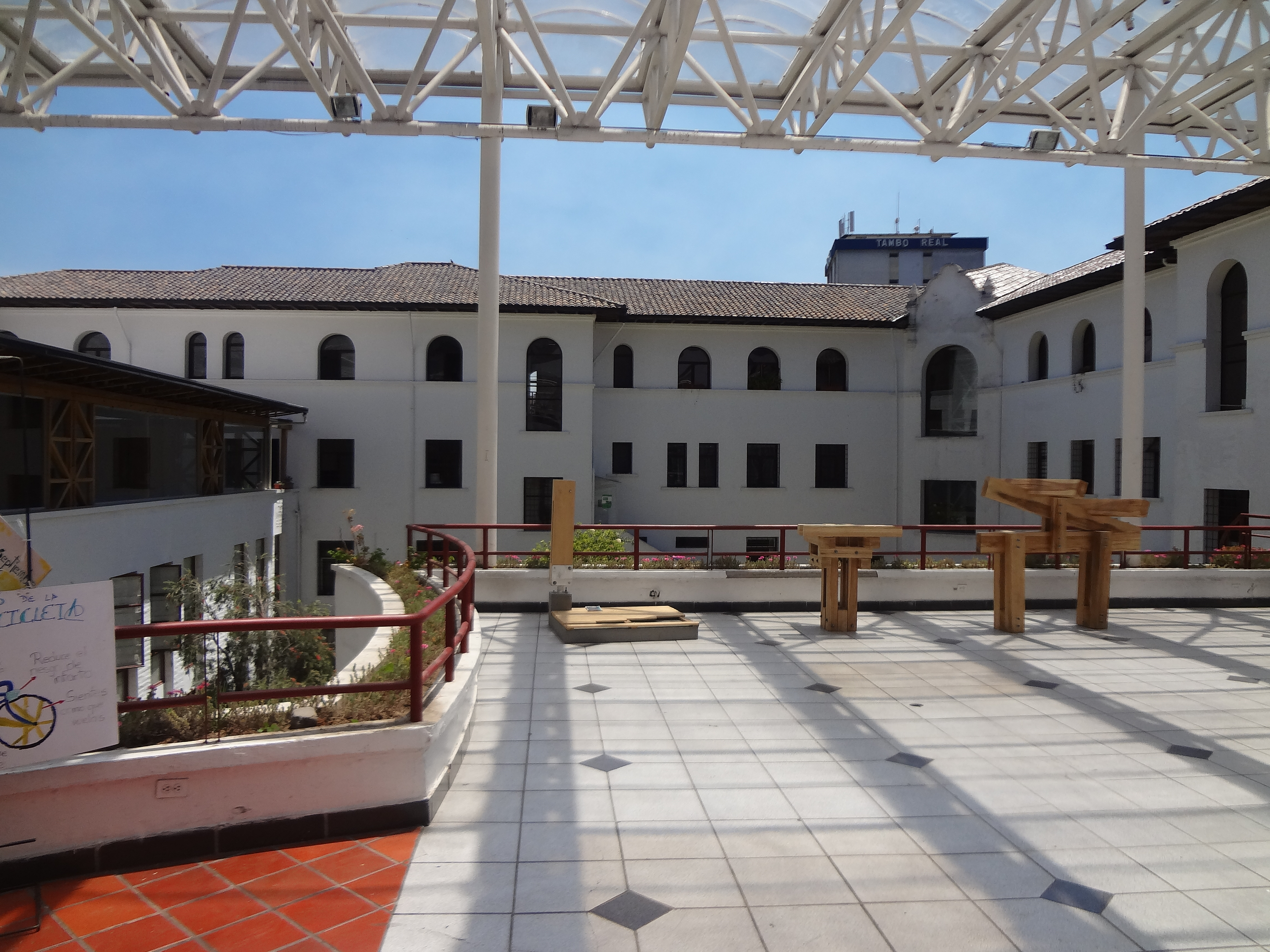

=== Library ===
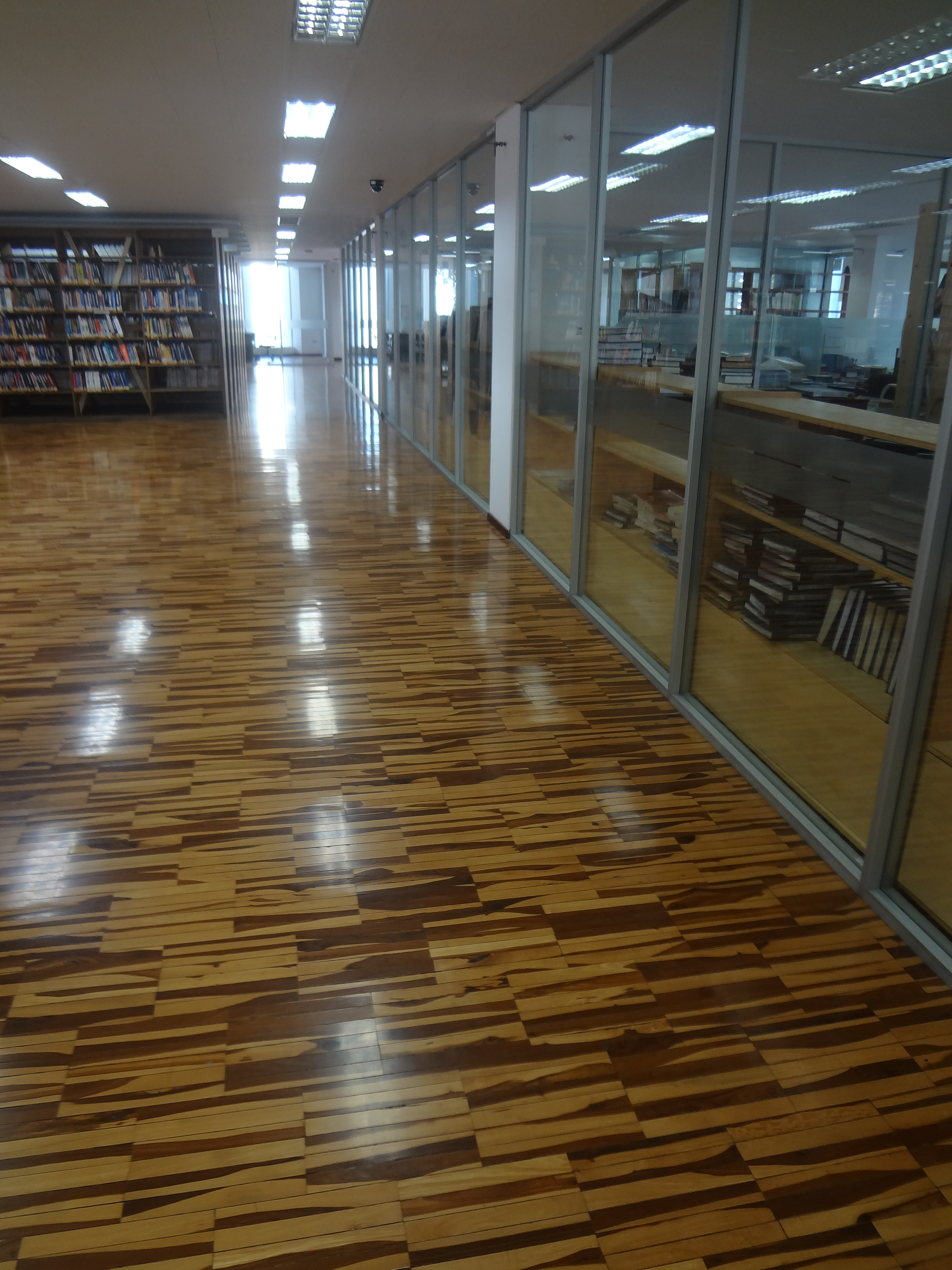

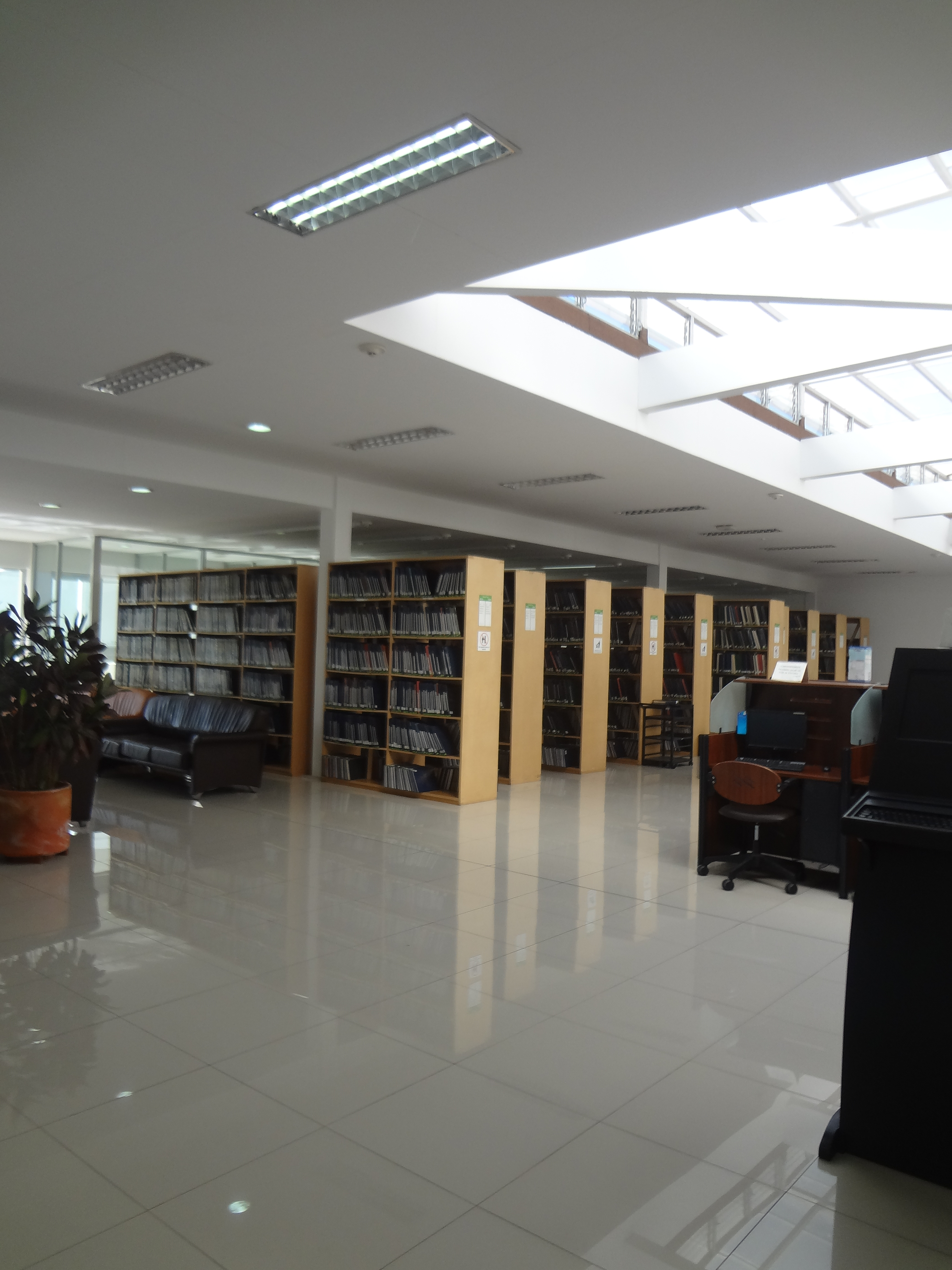

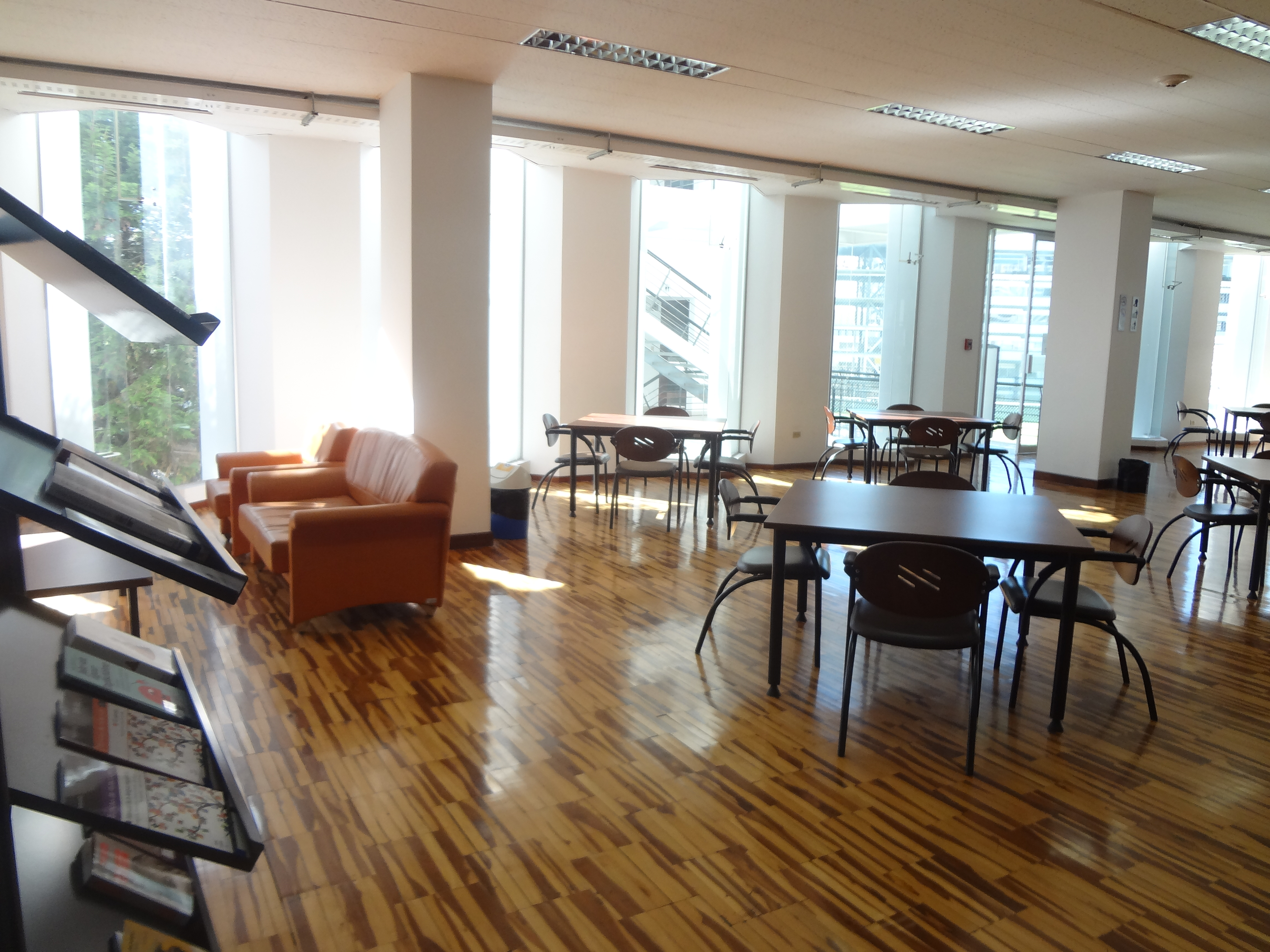

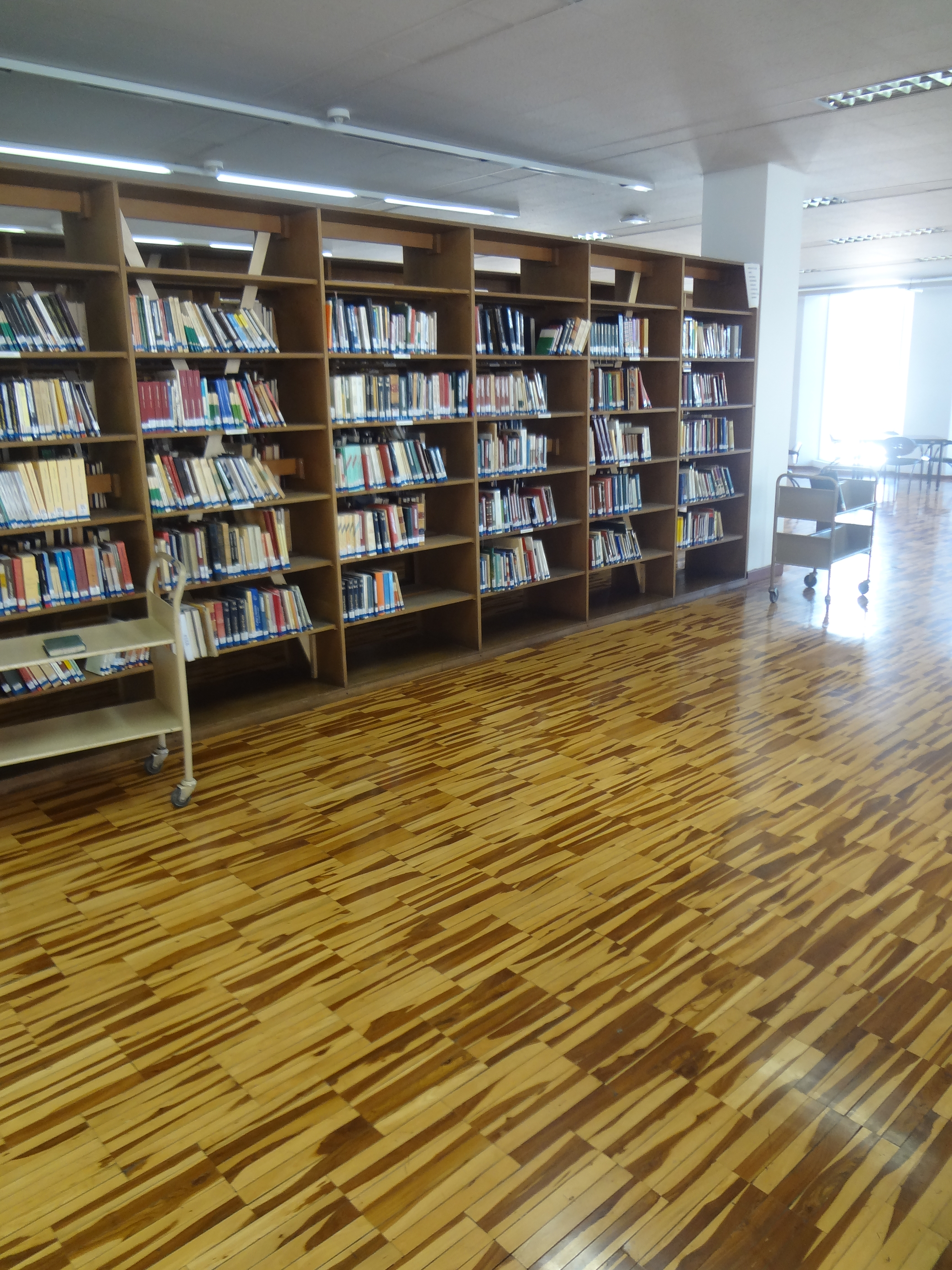

== See also ==
- List of Jesuit sites
