= List of people with dyslexia =

The following is a list of some notable people who have dyslexia. See also the People with dyslexia category for a longer list.

== A ==
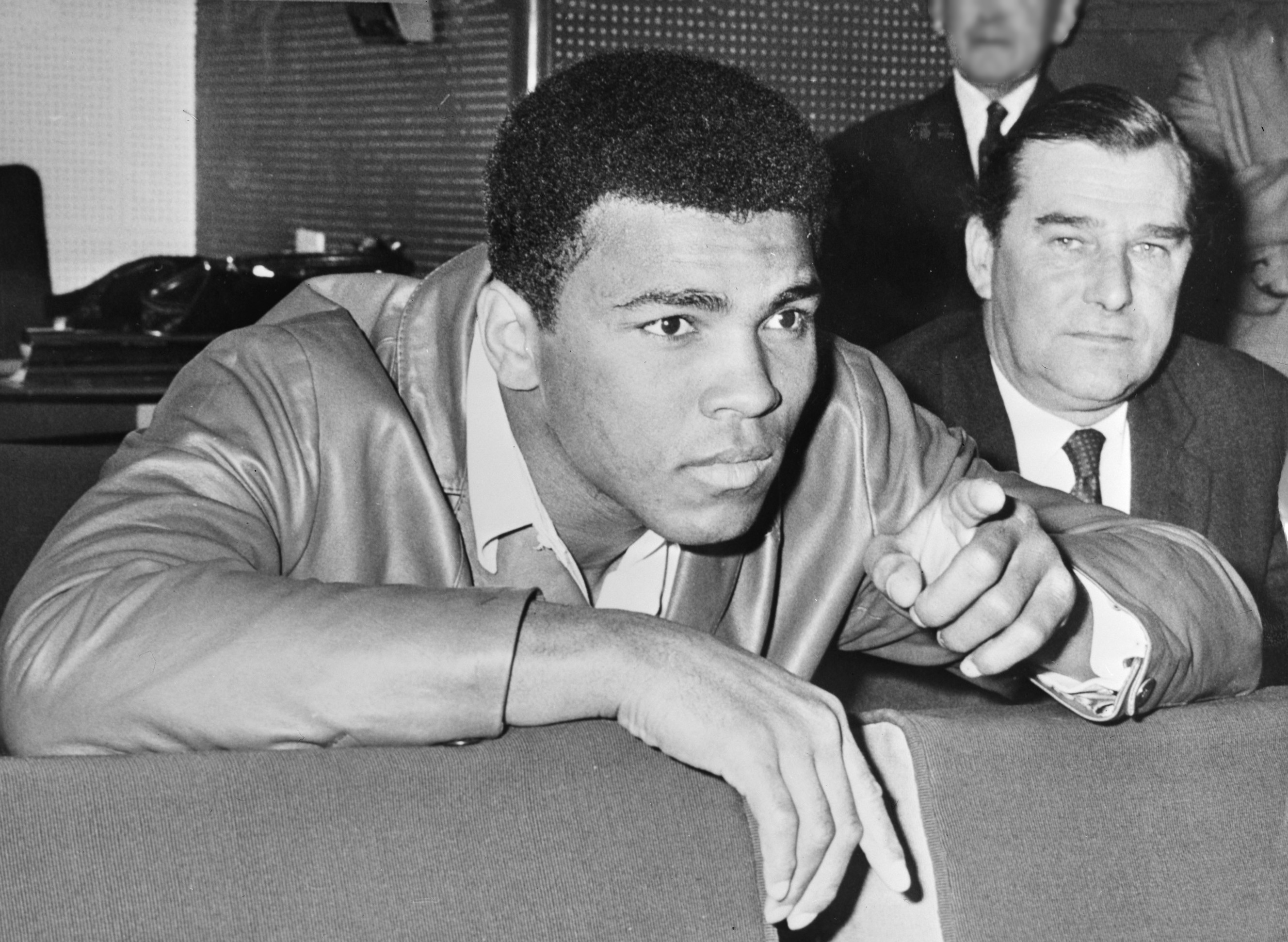
Muhammad Ali (1966)

- Eric Adams (born 1960), American politician and former mayor of New York
- Maggie Aderin-Pocock (born 1968), British space scientist and science educator
- Muhammad Ali (1942–2016), American professional boxer
- Sam Allardyce (born 1954), English footballer and football manager
- Marc Almond (born 1957), English singer (Soft Cell)
- Jennifer Aniston (born 1969), American actress

== B ==
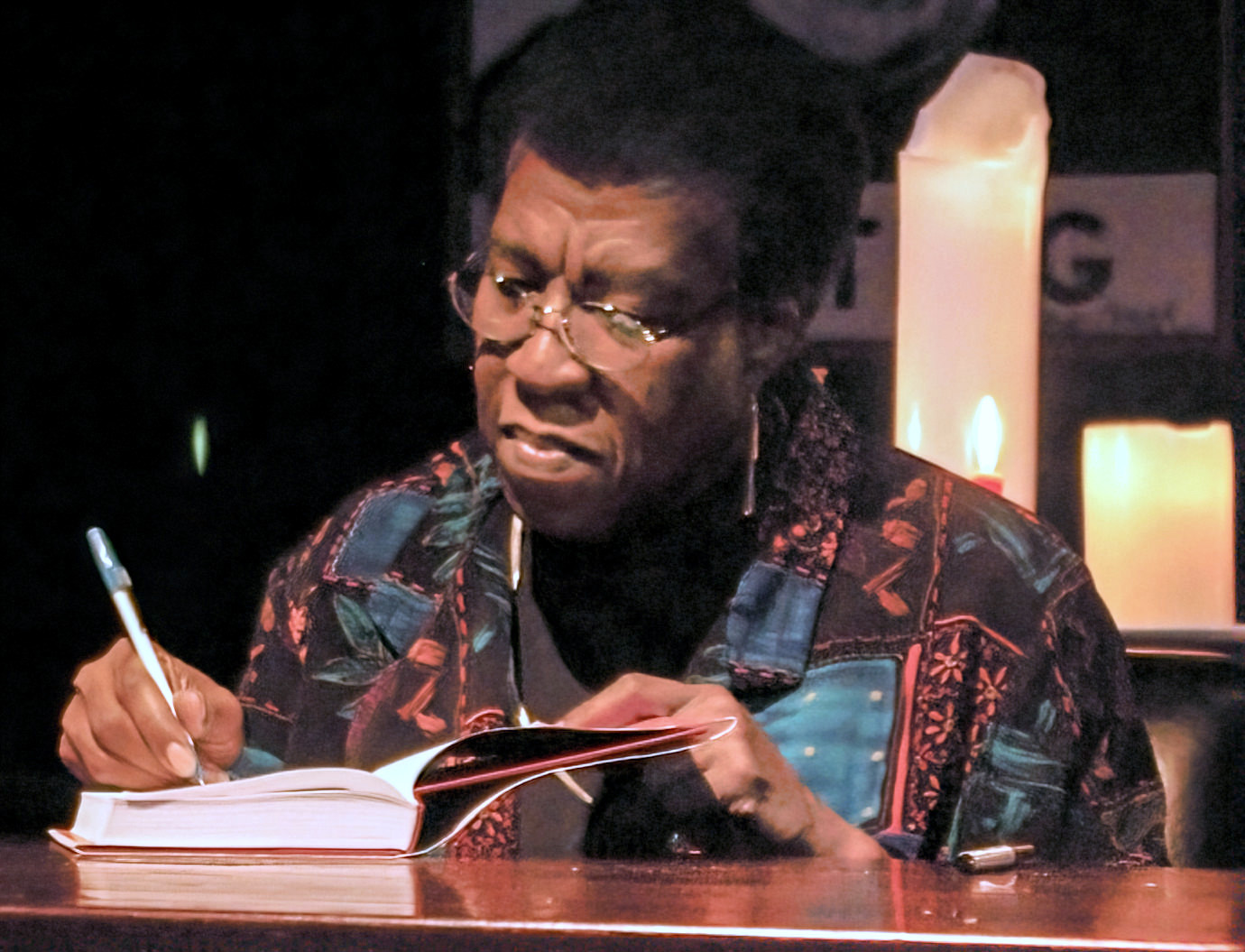
Octavia E. Butler

- Mel B (born 1975), English singer (Spice Girls)
- Abhishek Bachchan (born 1976), Indian Bollywood actor
- David Bailey, (born 1938), English photographer
- Robert Ballard (born 1942), deep sea explorer
- Ann Bancroft (born 1955), American arctic explorer
- Geoff Barrow (born 1971), English musician
- Princess Beatrice (born 1988), member of the British royal family
- Rob Beckett (born 1986), English comedian, television presenter and actor
- BENEE (born 2000), New Zealand singer-songwriter
- Robert Benton (1932–2025), American screenwriter and film director
- Orlando Bloom (born 1977), English actor
- Todd Bol (born 1956), Founder of Little Free Library
- Roberto Bolaño (1953–2003), Chilean novelist and poet
- Chaz Bono (born 1969), American advocate, writer, musician and actor
- Charley Boorman (born 1966), British TV presenter, writer and actor
- Sir Richard Branson (born 1950), English entrepreneur (Virgin Group)
- Nancy Brinker (born 1946), American ambassador and founder of The Promise Fund and Susan G. Komen for the Cure
- Erin Brockovich (born 1960), American legal clerk, consumer advocate and socio-environmental activist
- Max Brooks (born 1972), American actor and author
- Dame Darcey Bussell (born 1969), an English retired ballerina
- Octavia E. Butler (1947–2006), American science fiction author

== C ==
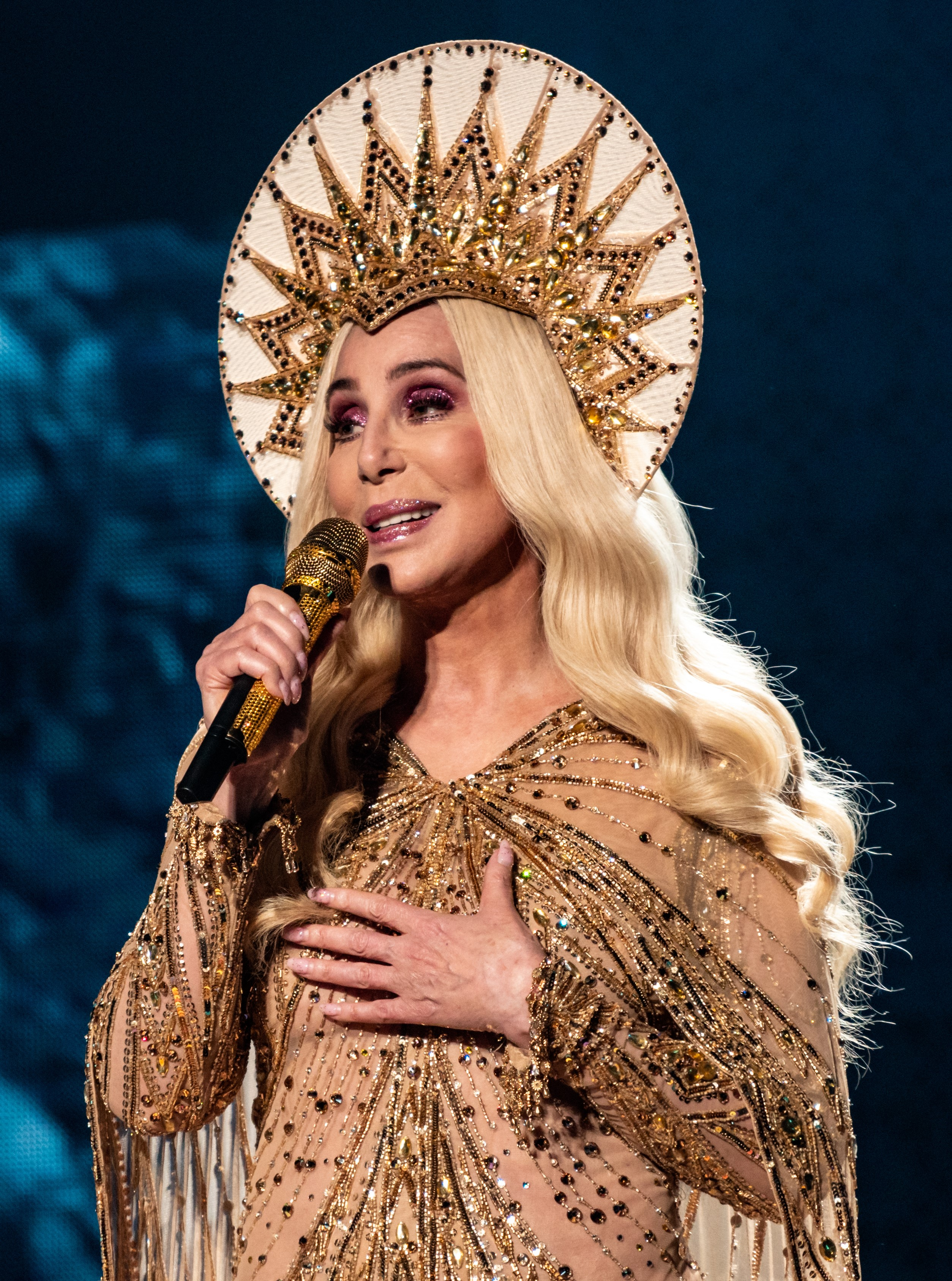
Cher

- Stephen J. Cannell (1941–2010), American television producer, writer and novelist
- Prince Carl Philip, Duke of Värmland (born 1979), Prince of Sweden
- Dan Carter, Canadian politician
- Jim Carrey (born 1962), Canadian-American actor and comedian
- Dave Chalk (born 1959), Canadian broadcaster and technology journalist
- John T. Chambers (born 1949), American businessman and CEO of Cisco
- Georgina Chapman (born 1976), English fashion designer and actress
- Blake Charlton (born 1979), American science fiction author and cardiologist
- Cher (born 1946), American singer and actress
- Amy Childs (born 1990), English model and television personality
- Sir Timothy Clifford (born 1946), British art historian
- Gary Cohn (born 1960), American business leader
- Jason Conley (born 1981), American basketball player
- Pete Conrad (1930–1999), American astronaut
- Anderson Cooper (born 1967), American broadcast journalist and political commentator
- Barbara Corcoran (born 1949), American businesswoman, columnist, and television personality
- Chris Cosentino (born 1972), American celebrity chef and television personality
- Toby Cosgrove (born 1940), American heart surgeon
- Tom Cruise (born 1962), American actor

== D ==
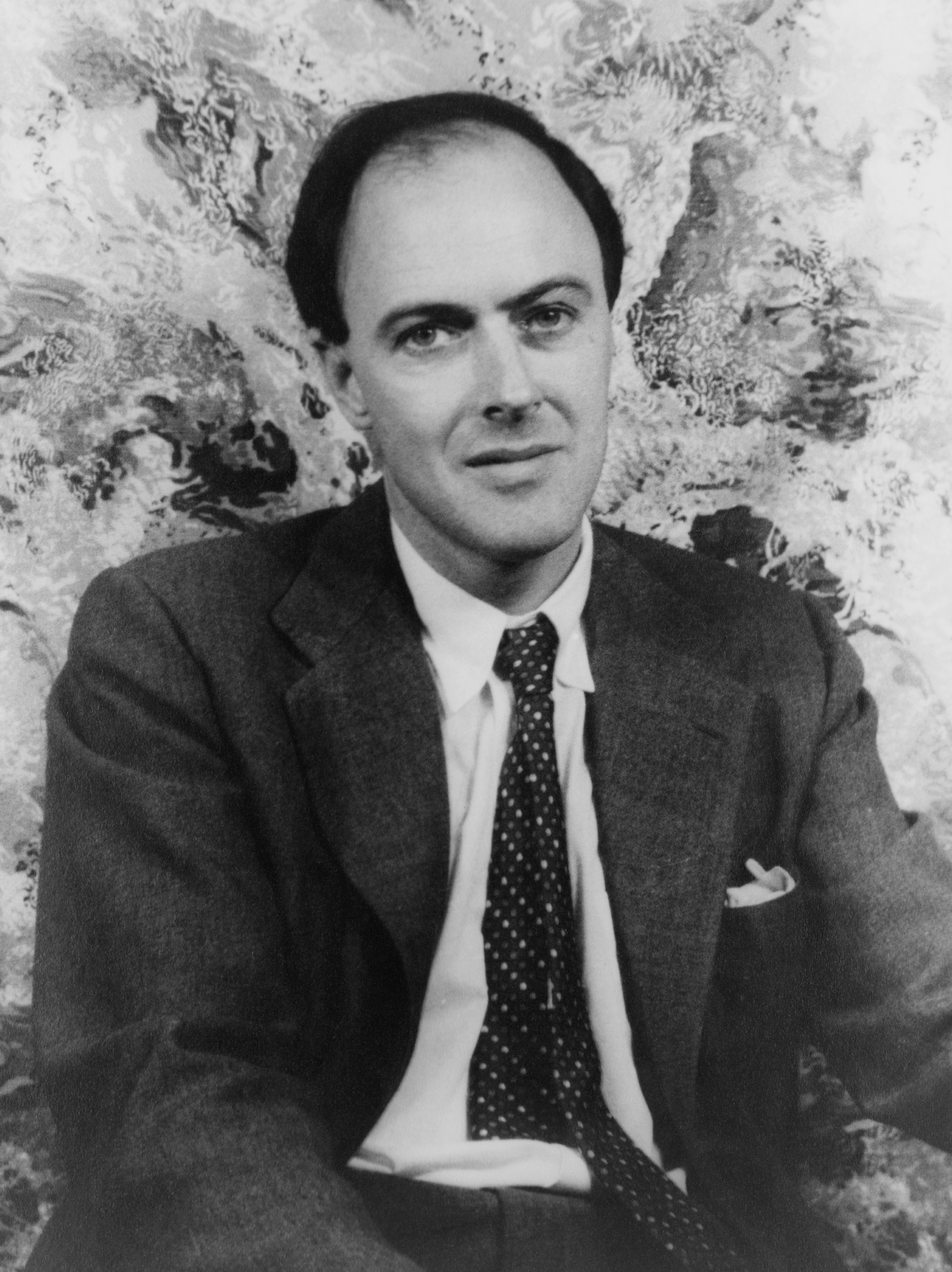
Roald Dahl

- Roald Dahl (1916–1990), British author
- Clark Janell Davis (born 1997), American model
- John de Lancie (born 1948), American actor and comedian
- Michelle de Swarte (born 1980), English actress, comedian, presenter, and model
- Samuel R. Delany (born 1942), American science fiction author and literary critic
- Patrick Dempsey (born 1966), American actor
- Paul Dewar (1963–2019), Canadian educator and politician
- Callum Dixon (born 2000), British rower
- Andrew Dornenburg (born 1958), American chef and author
- Nadine Dorries (born 1957), British politician
- Jacques Dubochet (born 1942), Swiss biophysicist
- Michael Dudikoff (born 1954), American actor

== E ==
- Arjan Ederveen (born 1956), Dutch actor and comedian
- Thomas Edison (1847–1931), American inventor and businessman
- Fae Ellington (born 1953), Jamaican media personality and lecturer
- Ari Emanuel (born 1961), American businessman and CEO of Endeavor
- Aslı Enver (born 1984), Turkish actress
- Amber Estenson, American social media influencer and opera singer

== F ==
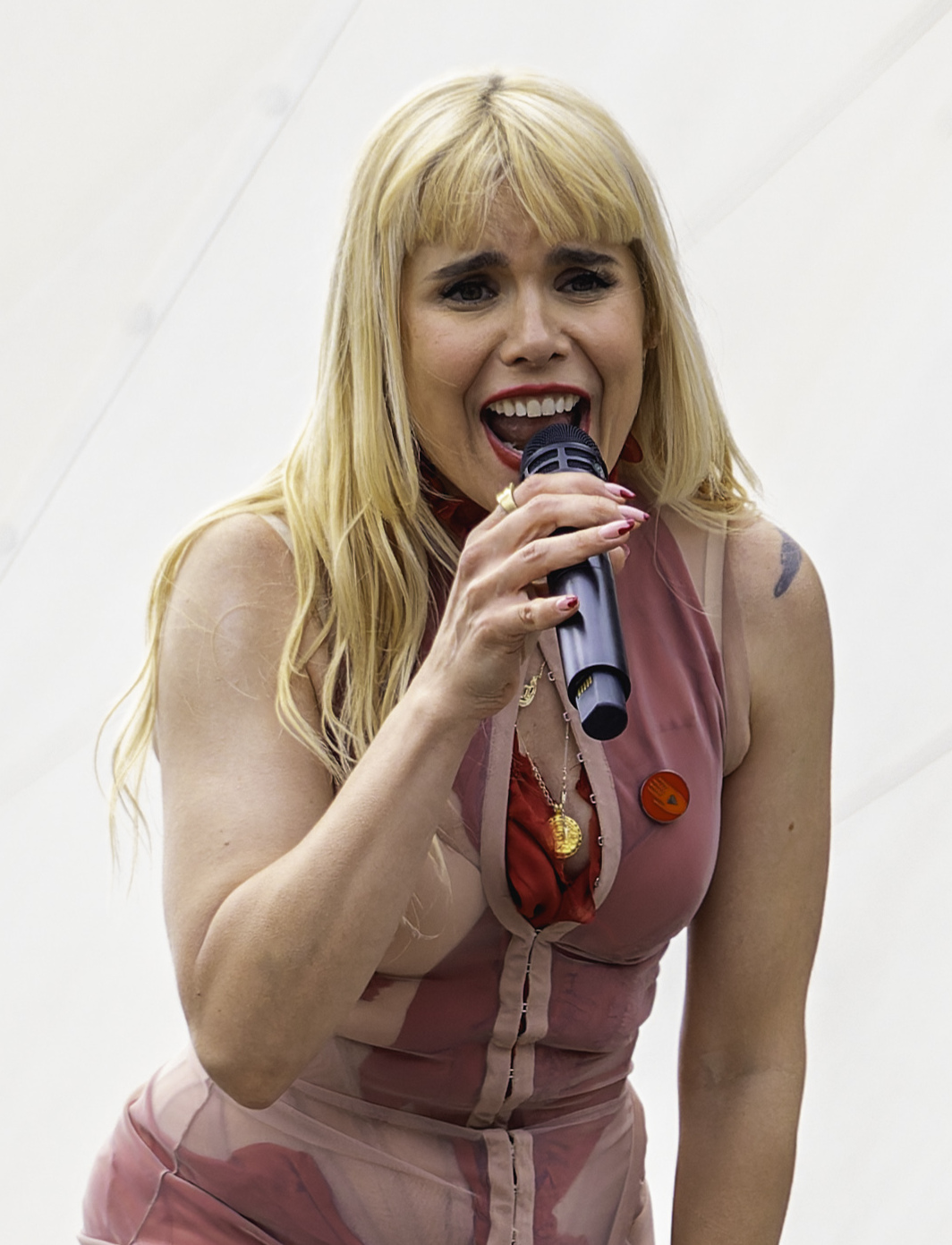
Paloma Faith

- Paloma Faith (born 1981), English singer-songwriter and actress
- Alexander Faludy (born 1983), English Reverend
- Steve Fielding (born 1960), Australian politician
- Fannie Flagg (born 1944), American actress, comedian and author
- Ben Fogle (born 1973), English television presenter, writer and adventurer
- Dave Foley (born 1963), Canadian comedian and actor
- Richard Ford (born 1944), American author
- Erik Foss (born 1973), artist and curator

== G ==
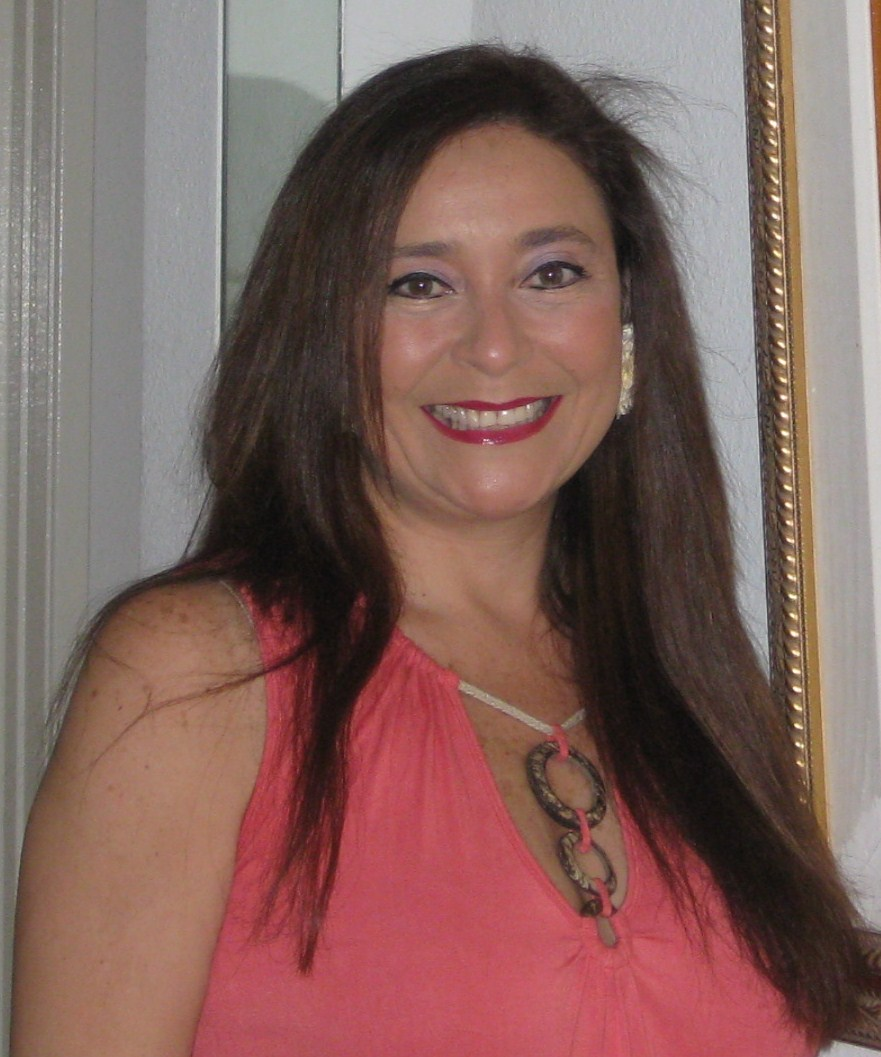
Karina Galvez

- Anaïs Gallagher (born 2000), English model and photographer
- Noel Gallagher (born 1967), English musician (Oasis)
- Karina Galvez (born 1964), Ecuadorian-American poet and television and radio personality
- Sally Gardner (born 1954), English children's book author and illustrator
- Rashan Gary (born 1997), American football player
- Gayle (born 2004), American singer
- Angela Giarratana (born 1993), American actress, writer, comedian, television host and podcast host.
- Mo Gilligan (born 1988), British stand-up comedian
- Glowie (born 1997), Icelandic singer
- Whoopi Goldberg (born 1955), American actress, comedian and television personality
- Alison Goldfrapp (born 1966), English musician and record producer (Goldfrapp)
- John B. Goodenough (1922–2023), American materials scientist
- Terry Goodkind (1948–2020), American writer
- Frank Gore (born 1983), American football player
- Ashley Graham (born 1987), American model and television presenter
- Mike Gravel (1930–2021), American politician
- Allan Gray (1938–2019), South African businessman and philanthropist
- Olive Gray (born 1994), English actor
- Brian Grazer (born 1951), American film and television producer and writer
- Carol W. Greider (born 1961), an American molecular biologist and Nobel laureate
- Kate Griggs, British social entrepreneur
- Carl XVI Gustaf (born 1946), King of Sweden since 1973

== H ==
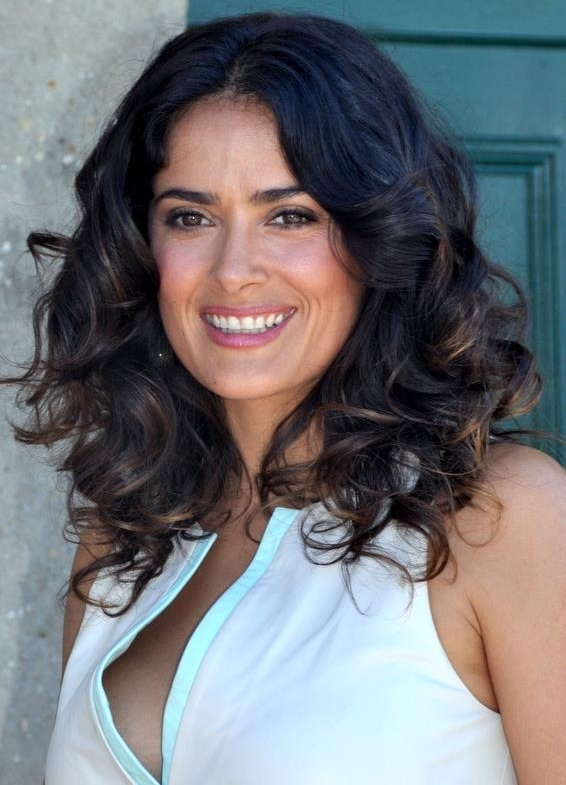
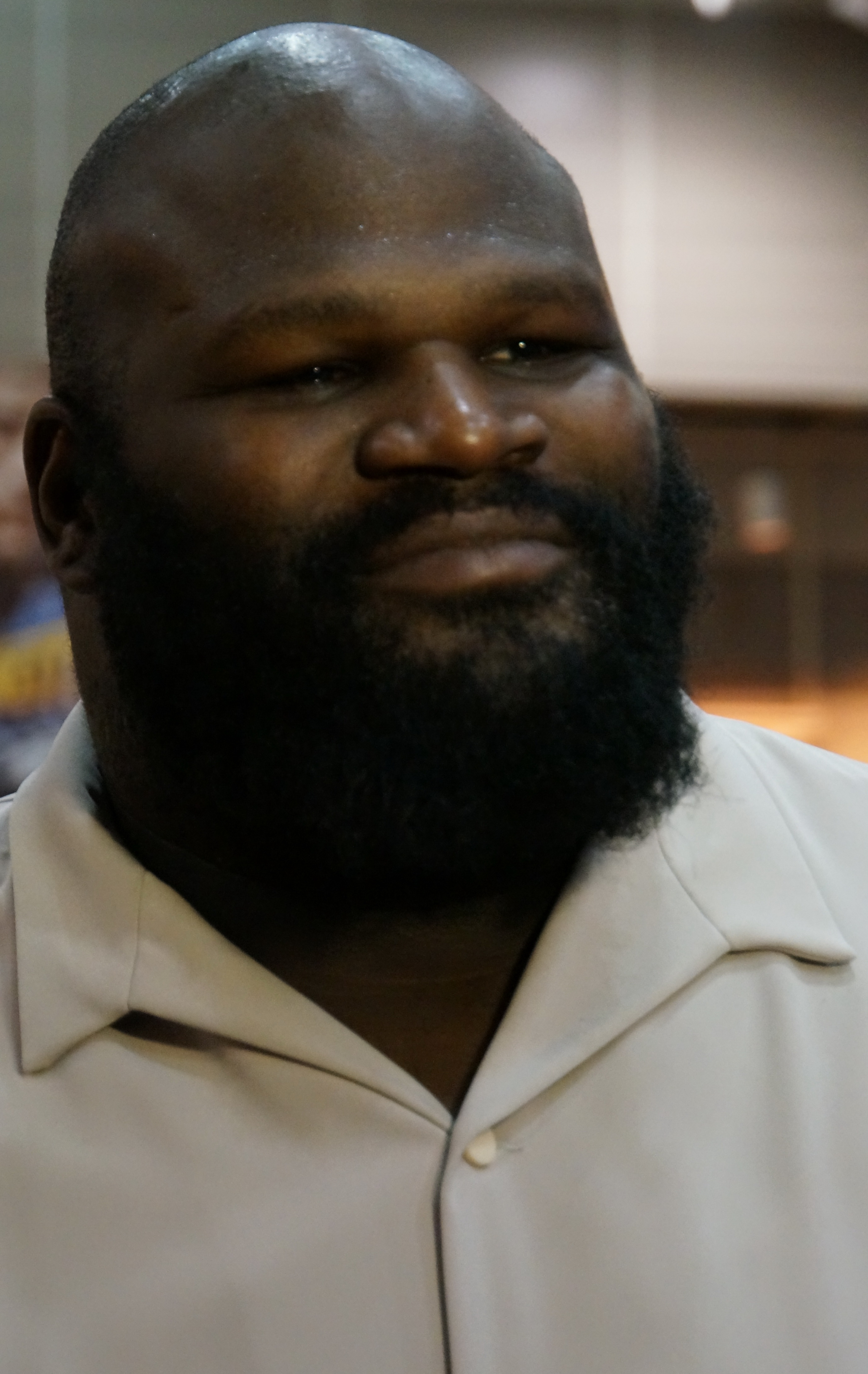
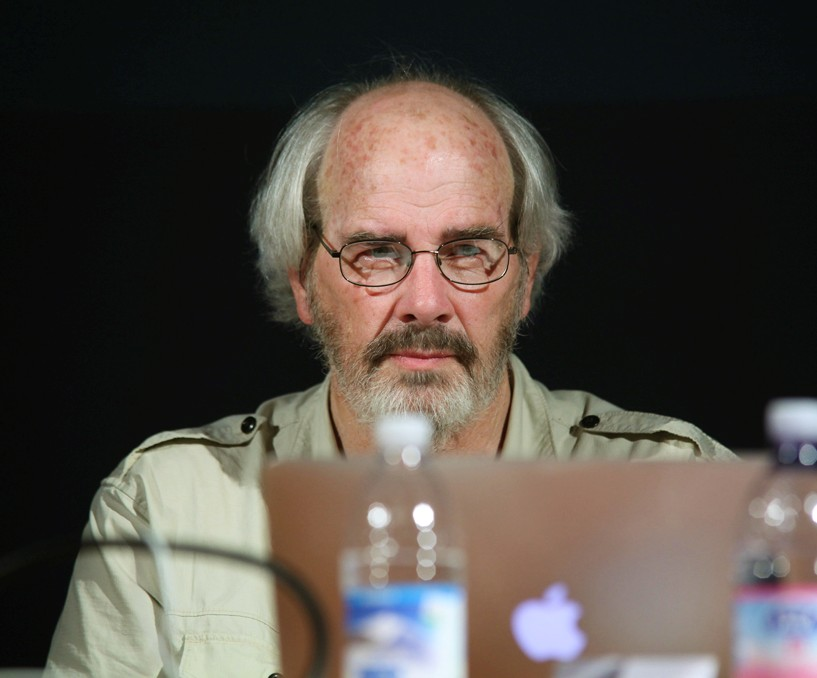
Salma Hayek, Mark Henry, and Jack Horner
- Jerry Hall (born 1956), American model and actress
- Lewis Hamilton (born 1985), British racing driver
- Susan Hampshire (born 1937), British actress
- Matt Hancock (born 1978), British politician
- Charles "Chuck" Harrison (1931–2018), American industrial designer
- Maya Hawke (born 1998), American actor, model and singer-songwriter
- Salma Hayek (born 1966), Mexican actress
- Mark Henry (born 1971), American professional wrestler and powerlifter
- Bill Hewlett (1913–2001), American engineer
- John Hickenlooper (born 1952), American politician
- Tommy Hilfiger (born 1951), American fashion designer
- John Hoke III (born 1965), American architect and designer
- Tom Holland (born 1996), English actor
- Sir Anthony Hopkins (born 1937), Welsh actor and director
- Jack Horner (born 1946), American palaeontologist

== I ==
- Boman Irani (born 1959), Bollywood actor
- John Irving (born 1942), American author and screenwriter
- Jony Ive (born 1967), English product designer
- Eddie Izzard (born 1962), British comedian, actor and activist

== J ==
- Caitlyn Jenner (born 1949), American media personality, retired Olympic gold medal-winning athlete and transgender activist
- Daymond John (born 1969), American businessman, investor and television personality (Shark Tank)
- Colin Jones (1936–2021), English photographer and ballet dancer

== K ==
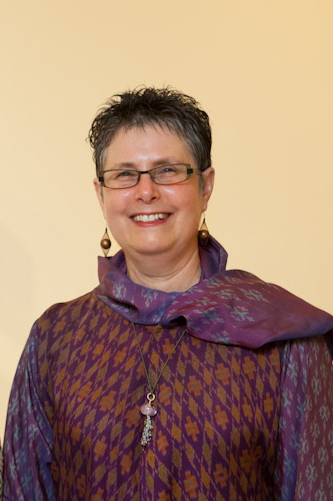
Rebecca Kamen

- Rebecca Kamen (born 1950), American artist and sculptor
- Ingvar Kamprad (1926–2018), Swedish industrialist
- Paul Kanjorski (born 1937), American politician
- John F. Kennedy (1917–1963), 35th President of the United States
- Mollie King (born 1987), English singer and radio presenter
- Laura Kirkpatrick (born 1989), American model and fashion designer
- Tawny Kitaen (1961–2021), American actress and model
- Keira Knightley (born 1985), English actress
- Willem Johan Kolff (1911–2009), Dutch physician
- David Koresh (1959–1993), American cult leader of the Branch Davidians

== L ==
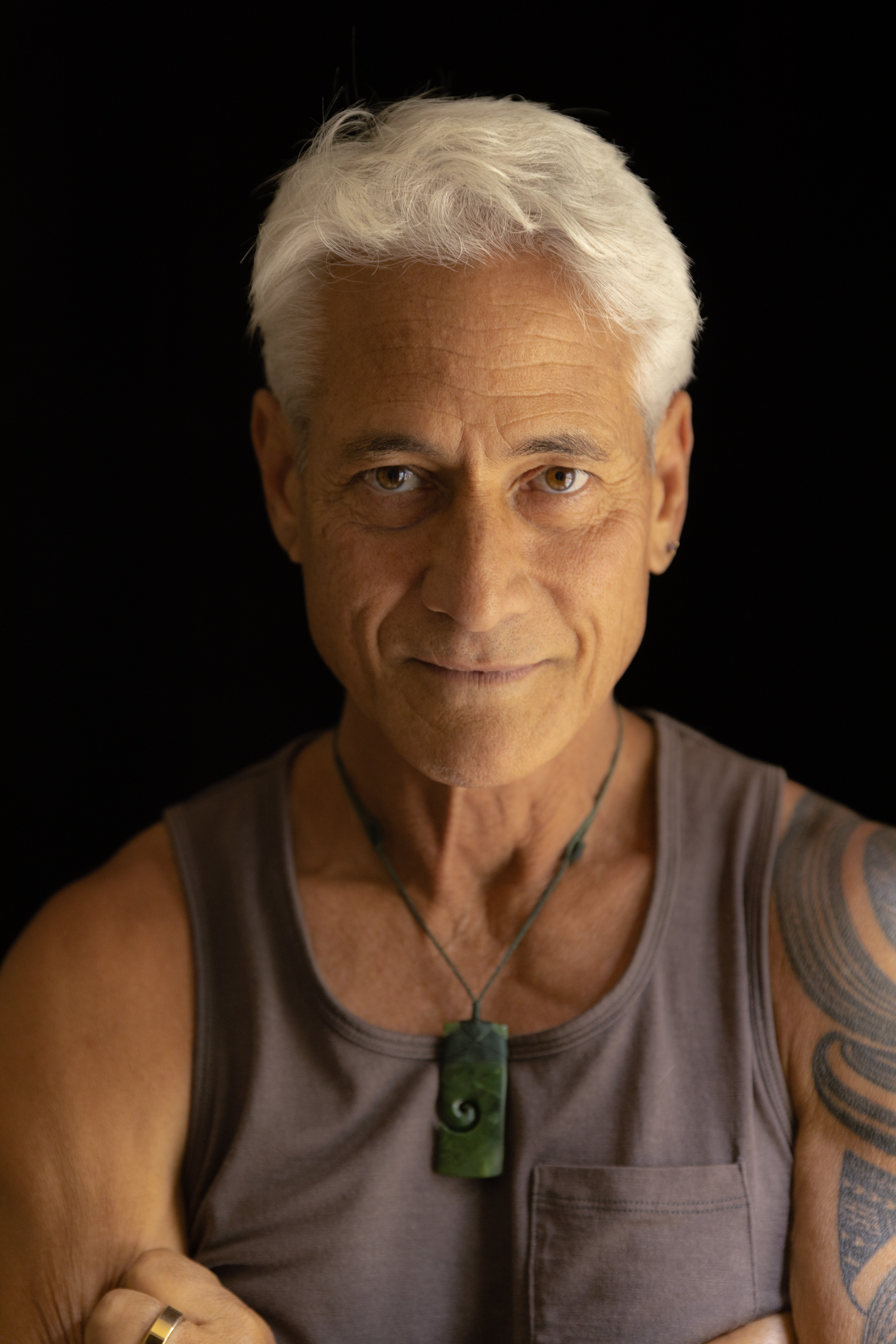
Greg Louganis

- LadBaby (born 1987), English YouTuber, blogger and philanthropist
- Penny Lancaster (born 1971), English model
- Eugene Landy (1934–2006), American psychologist
- J. F. Lawton (born 1960), American writer, producer and director
- Lee Kuan Yew (1923–2015), 1st Prime Minister of Singapore
- Peter Leitch (born 1944), New Zealand businessman and philanthropist
- Angie Le Mar (born 1965), British comedian, actress and writer
- Jay Leno (born 1950), American television presenter and comedian
- Tom Lewis (born 1991), English golfer
- Lil Pump (born 2000), American rapper
- Kenny Logan (born 1972), Scottish rugby union player
- Harry Lorayne (1926–2023) American magician, memory-training specialist, and author
- Greg Louganis (born 1960), American diver, author and LGBT rights activist
- Prince Louis of Luxembourg (born 1986), Prince of Luxembourg
- Noah Lyles (born 1997), American athlete

== M ==
- Anthony Mackie (born 1978), American actor
- Dannel Malloy (born 1955), American politician
- Jo Malone (born 1963), British perfumer and entrepreneur
- Steve Mariotti (1953–2024), American social entrepreneur and educator
- Mireille Mathieu (born 1946), French singer
- Lee Marvin (1924–1987), American actor
- Don McCullin (born 1935), British photojournalist
- Joel McHale (born 1971), American actor, comedian, and television presenter
- Charlotte McKinney (born 1993), American model and actress
- Steve McQueen (1930–1980), American actor
- Steve McQueen (born 1969), British film director
- Kendrick Meek (born 1966), American politician
- Douglas Merrill (born 1970), American technologist and fintech entrepreneur
- M.I.A. (born 1975), British rapper and singer
- Mika (born 1983), Lebanese-born English singer-songwriter
- Alyssa Milano (born 1972), American actress
- Jerry Moffatt (born 1963), British rock climber
- A. R. Morlan (1958–2016), American writer
- Dorrit Moussaieff (born 1950), Israeli jewellery designer
- Shlomo Moussaieff (1925–2015), Israeli businessman, biblical antiquities collector, and Bible scholar
- Don Mullan (born 1956), Irish author, producer and humanitarian
- Róisín Murphy (born 1973), Irish singer-songwriter and record producer
- Jaime Murray (born 1976), English actress

== N ==
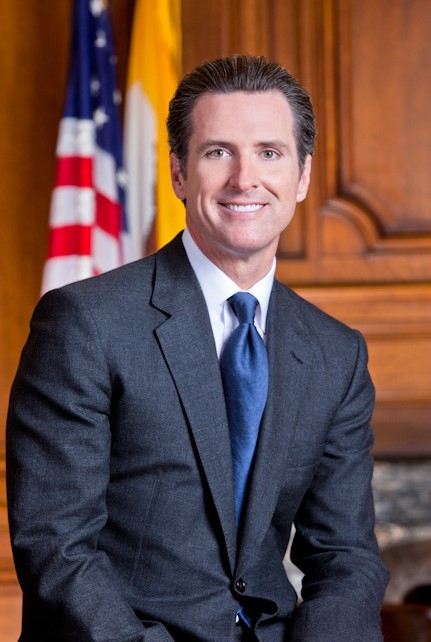
Gavin Newsom

- Steven Naismith (born 1986), Scottish professional footballer
- David Neeleman (born 1959), Brazilian-American businessman and entrepreneur
- Gavin Newsom (born 1967), American politician
- Jace Norman (born 2000), American actor
- Mike Norris (born 1961), English businessman

== O ==
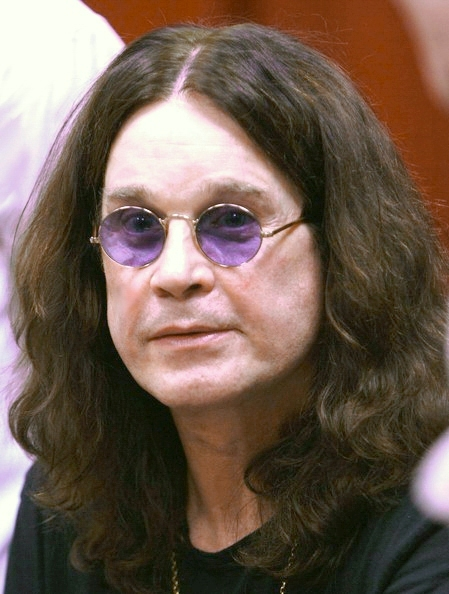
Ozzy Osbourne

- Paul Oakenfold (born 1963), English record producer and DJ
- Brendan O'Carroll (born 1955), Irish actor and comedian
- Danny O'Carroll (born 1983), Irish actor
- Josh O’Connor (born 1990), English actor
- Olav V of Norway (1903–1991), King of Norway (1957–1991)
- Jamie Oliver (born 1975), British chef and television presenter
- Naoisé O'Reilly, Irish psychologist
- Paul Orfalea (born 1947), American entrepreneur
- Ozzy Osbourne (1948–2025), English musician and television personality
- Will Ospreay (born 1993), English professional wrestler

== P ==
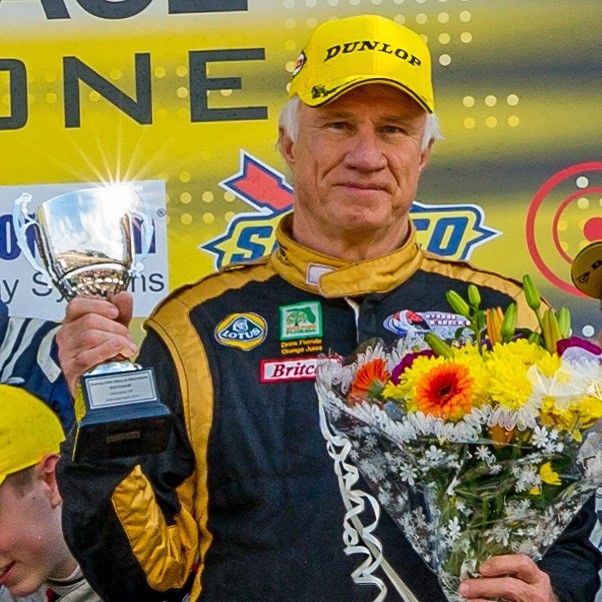
Hal Prewitt

- Alice Pagani (born 1998), Italian actress, model and author
- Diamond Dallas Page (born 1956), American professional wrestler, actor and author
- Theo Paphitis (born 1959), Cypriot-born British businessman and retail magnate
- Nicholas Parsons (1923–2020), English actor and presenter
- Jean Paton (born 1929), British bryologist and botanical illustrator
- River Phoenix (1970–1993), American actor and musician
- Dav Pilkey (born 1966), American author and illustrator
- Jerry Pinkney (1939–2021), American illustrator and writer
- Daniel Powter (born 1971), Canadian singer-songwriter
- Hal Prewitt (born 1954), American artist, photographer, entrepreneur and race car driver

== Q ==
- Scott Quinnell (born 1972), Welsh rugby union player

== R ==
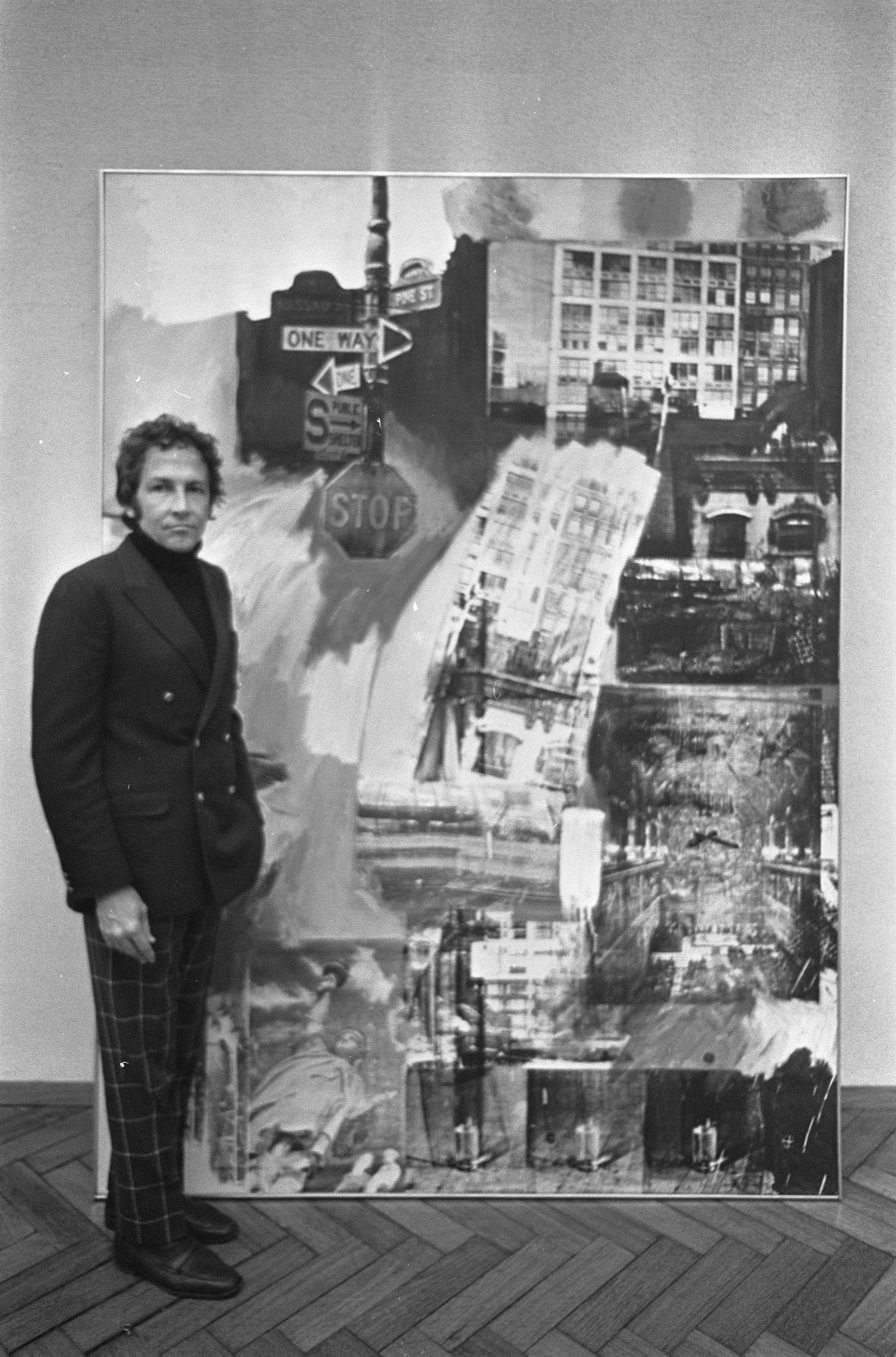
Robert Rauschenberg

- Bodo Ramelow (born 1956), German politician
- Sara Rankin, British scientist
- Robert Rauschenberg (1925–2008), American artist
- Keanu Reeves (born 1964), Canadian actor
- Luz Rello (born 1984), Spanish linguist and dyslexia researcher
- Nicolas Winding Refn (born 1970), Danish film director
- Iwan Rheon (born 1985), Welsh actor and musician
- Freya Ridings, (born 1994), English singer, songwriter, and multi-instrumentalist
- Guy Ritchie (born 1968), English film director
- Chris Robshaw (born 1986), English rugby union player
- Simone Rocha (born 1986), Irish fashion designer
- David Rockefeller (1915–2017), American business executive and philanthropist
- Nelson Rockefeller (1908–1979), American politician
- Richard Rogers (1933–2021), British architect
- Justin Roiland (born 1980), American animator and voice actor
- Kelle Roos (born 1992), Dutch footballer
- Louis B. Rosenberg (born 1969), American engineer and businessperson
- Hans Rosling (1948–2017), Swedish international health professor and statistician
- Mark Ruffalo (born 1967), American actor and producer
- Stephanie Ruhle (born 1975) American news host and business analyst
- Rex Ryan (born 1962), American football coach and analyst

== S ==
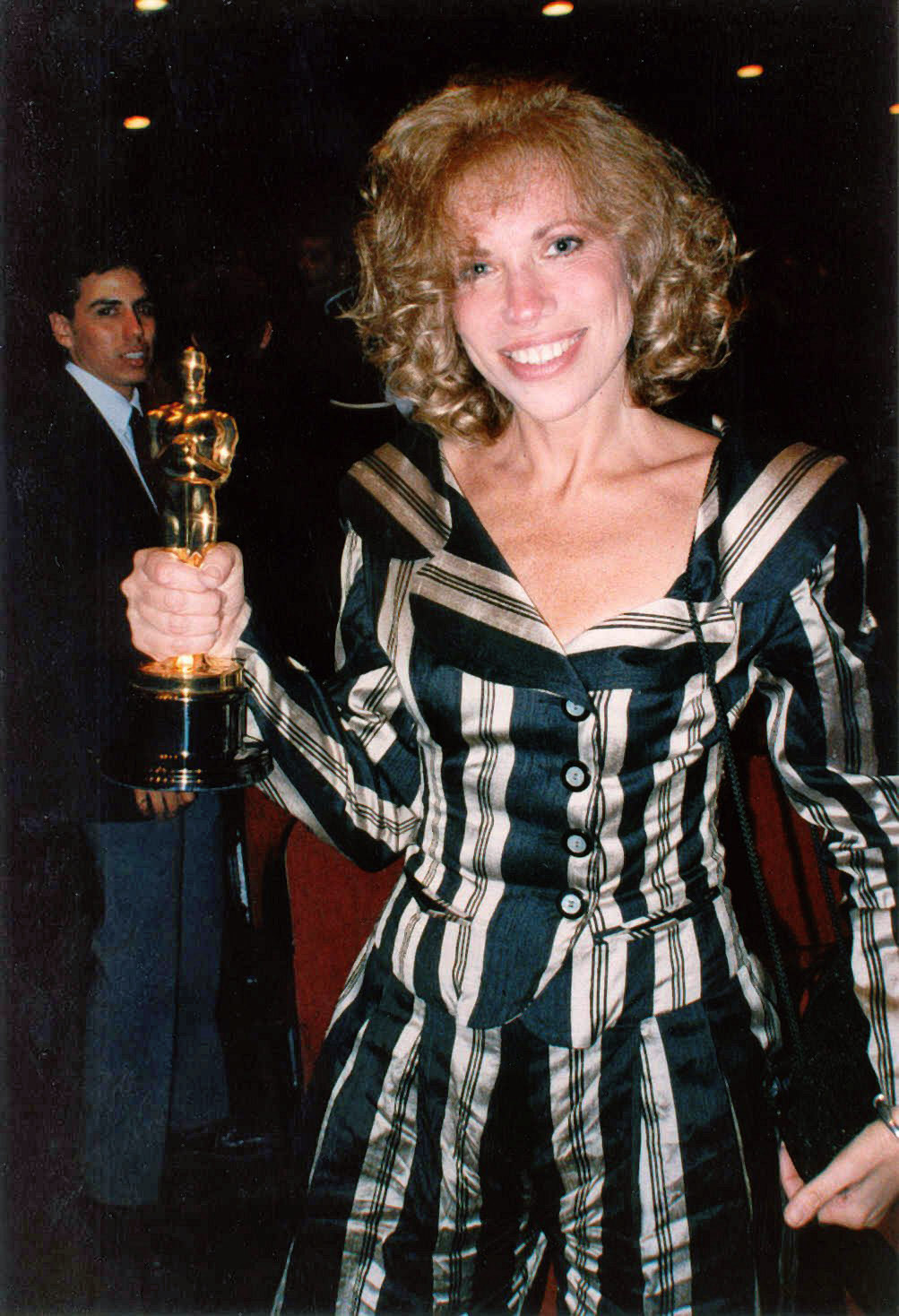
Carly Simon with Oscar award at the 61st Academy Awards

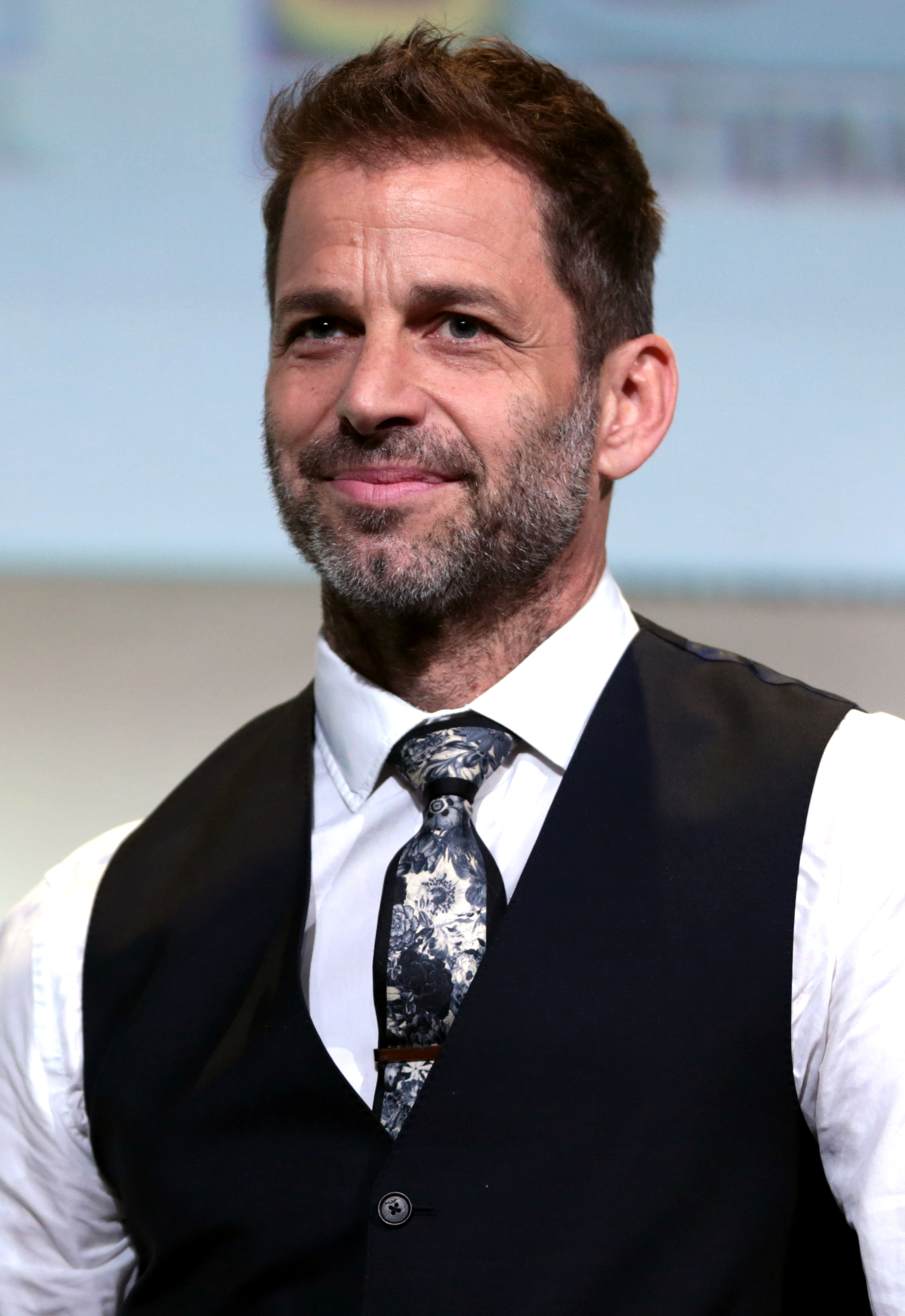
Zack Snyder

- Lauren Sánchez (born 1969), American media personality
- Ronja Savolainen (born 1997), Finnish ice hockey player
- Mark Schlereth (born 1966), American football player
- Philip Schultz (born 1945), American poet and founder of the Writers Studio
- Charles R. Schwab (born 1937), American investor
- Arnold Schwarzenegger (born 1947), Austrian and American actor, businessman, politician, and bodybuilder
- Tim Scott (born 1971), English guitarist
- Jo Self (born 1956), English contemporary artist and poet
- Dax Shepard (born 1975), American actor, comedian, and filmmaker
- Peter Shumlin (born 1956), American politician
- Carly Simon (born 1943), American singer-songwriter, memoirist, and children's author
- Eileen Simpson (1918–2002), American writer and psychotherapist
- Bryan Singer (born 1965), American film director
- Callum Skinner (born 1992), Scottish racing cyclist
- Neil Smith (born 1966), American football player
- Zack Snyder (born 1966), American film director, producer, and screenwriter, who has publicly stated that he has dyslexia
- Erna Solberg, (born 1961), Norwegian politician
- Brent Sopel (born 1977), Canadian ice hockey player
- Steven Spielberg (born 1946), American film director and screenwriter
- Octavia Spencer (born 1970), American actress
- Glenn Stearns (born 1963), American entrepreneur
- Georgia Steel (born 1998), English television personality
- Gwen Stefani (born 1969), American singer-songwriter
- Stefán Karl Stefánsson (1975–2018), Icelandic actor
- Sir Jackie Stewart (born 1939), Scottish racing driver
- Sir David Stirling (1915–1990), Scottish military officer
- Joss Stone (born 1987), English singer
- Musa Sukwene (born 1986), South Africa singer
- Kristy Swanson (born 1969), American actress
- Diane Swonk (born 1962), American economic advisor

== T ==
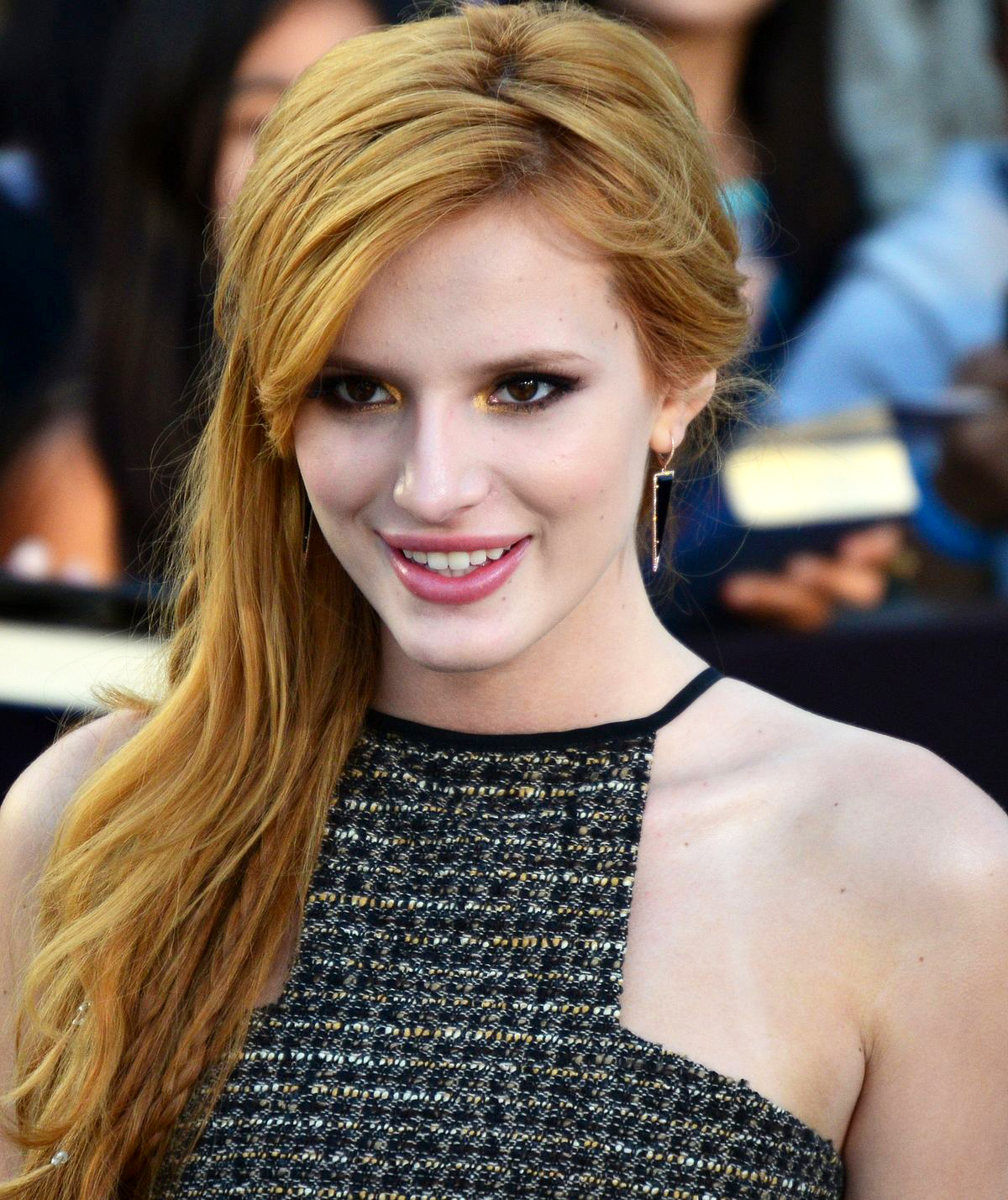
Bella Thorne

- Helen B. Taussig (1898–1986), American cardiologist
- Tim Tebow (born 1987), American football player
- Bella Thorne (born 1997), American actress, singer and writer
- Kara Tointon (born 1983), English actress
- Tina Turner (1939–2023), American-born Swiss singer

== V ==
- Krystal Versace (born 2001), English drag queen
- Victoria, Crown Princess of Sweden (born 1977), heir apparent to the Swedish throne

== W ==
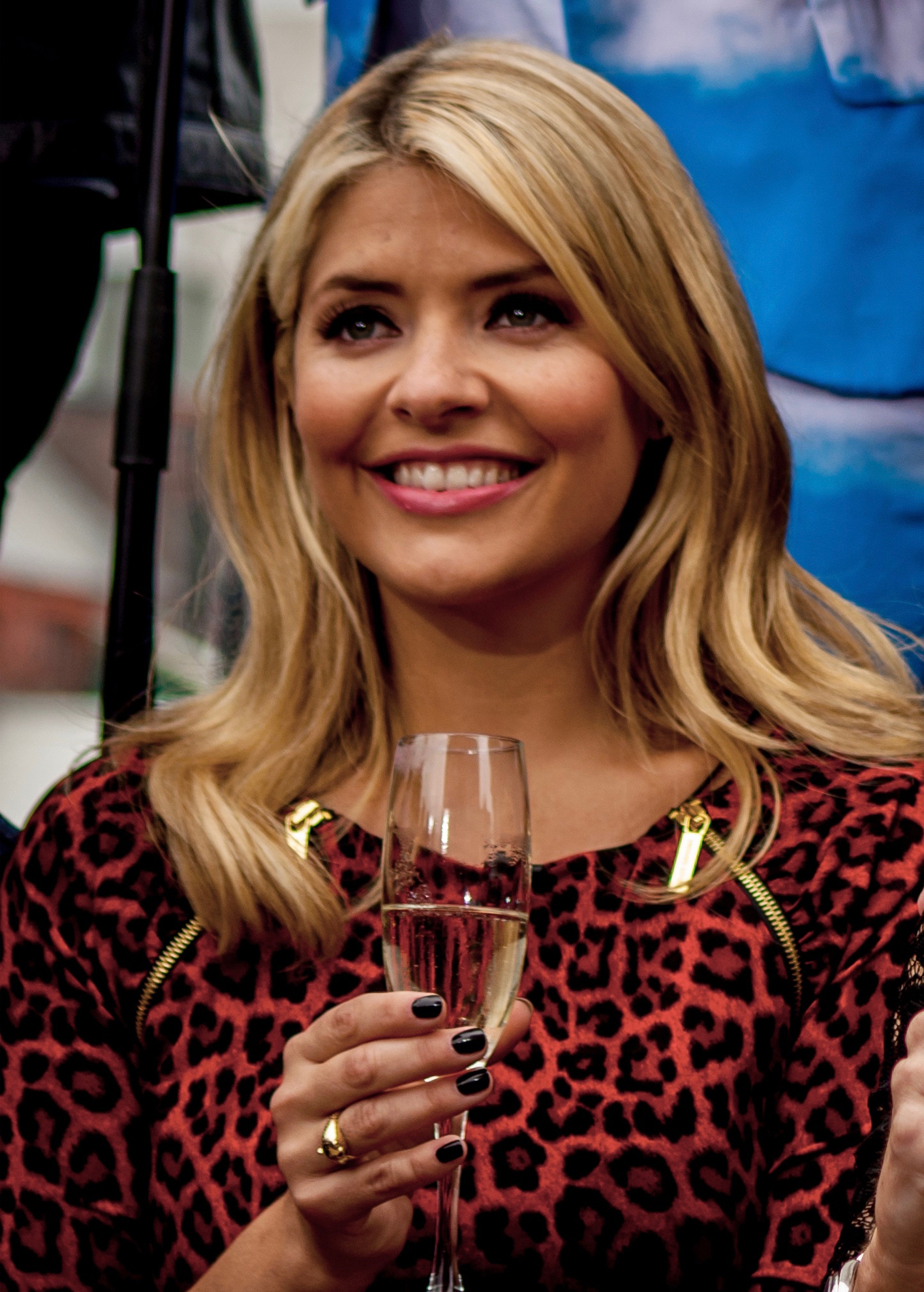
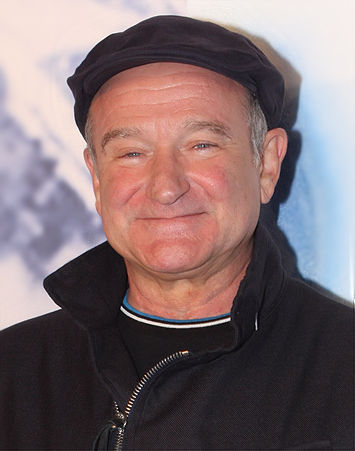
Holly Willoughby and Robin Williams
- Lindsay Wagner (born 1949), American actress
- Camille Walala (born 1975), French artist
- Butch Walker (born 1969), American singer and record producer
- Andy Warhol (1928–1987) American artist and filmmaker
- Ben Watkins (born 1957), English musician
- Ben Way (born 1980), English entrepreneur
- Bob Weir (1947–2026), American guitarist
- Cliff Weitzman (born 1995?), Israeli-American entrepreneur
- Willard Wigan (born 1957), English sculptor
- Florence Welch (born 1986), British-American singer
- Mark Wilkinson (1950–2017), English furniture designer
- Toyah Willcox (born 1958), English singer and actress
- Robbie Williams (born 1974), English singer-songwriter
- Robin Williams (1951–2014), American actor and comedian
- Holly Willoughby (born 1981), English television presenter
- Justin Wilson (1978–2015), British racing driver
- Henry Winkler (born 1945), American actor and spokesman for The Dyslexia Foundation
- Joshua Wong (born 1996), Hong Kong activist
- Bethan Laura Wood (born 1983), English designer
- Dominic Wood (born 1978), English radio and television presenter and magician

== Y ==
- Hamza Yassin (born 1990), British TV presenter and cameraman
- William Butler Yeats (1865–1939), Irish poet and playwright
- Michael Young (born 1966), British designer

== Z ==
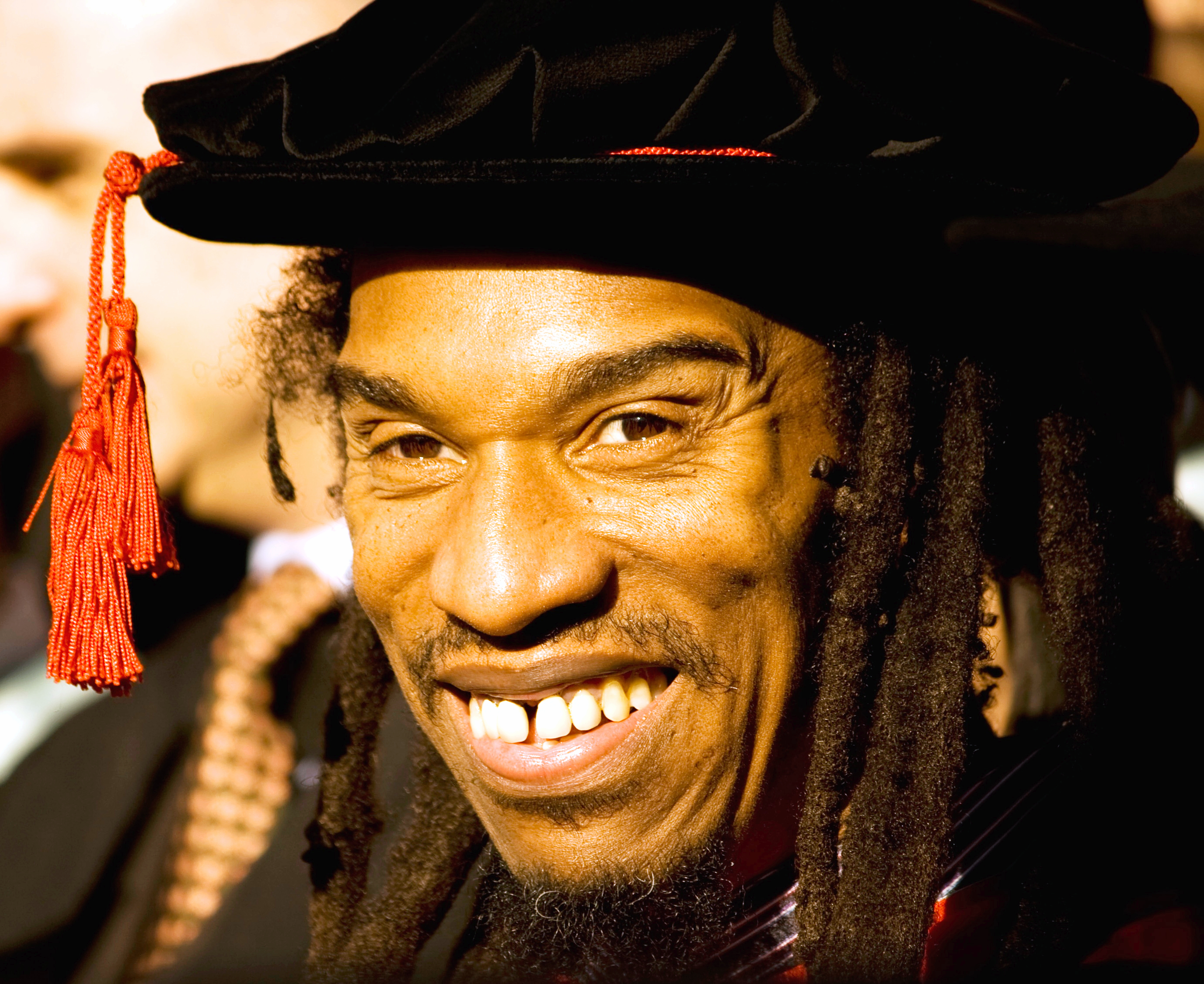
Benjamin Zephaniah

- Benjamin Zephaniah (1958–2023), British writer and poet
