= Pablo Goldstein =

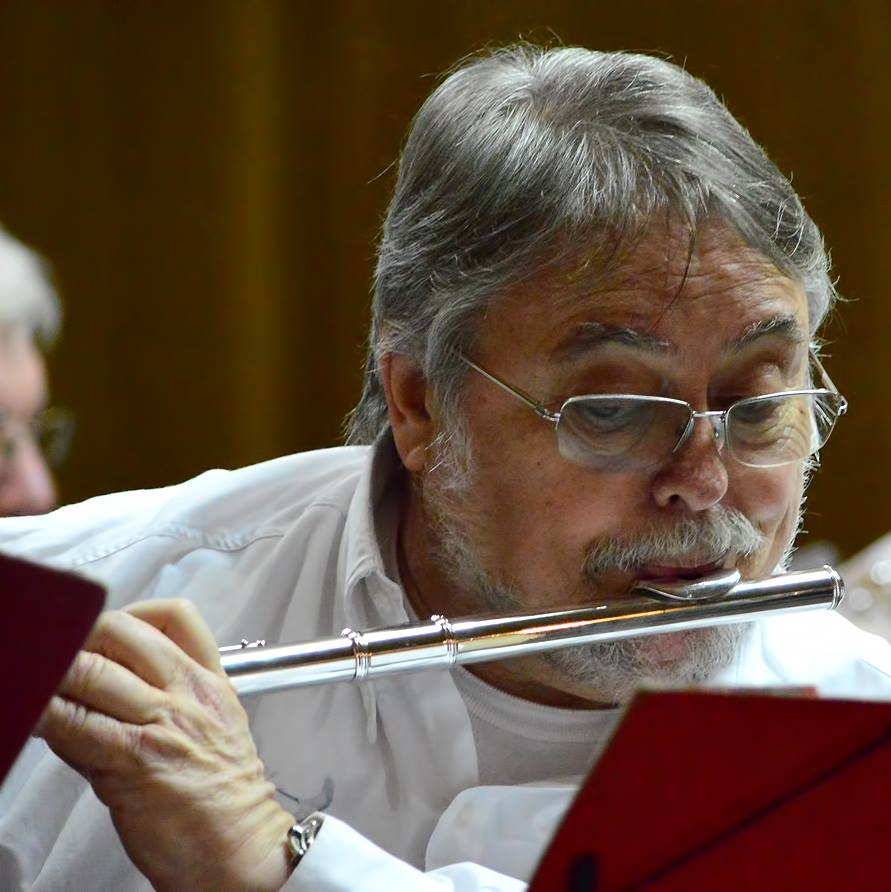
- Pablo Goldstein
- Born: February 3, 1950 (age 75); Buenos Aires, Argentina
- Occupation(s): Musician, music therapist
- Known for: Music therapy

Pablo Goldstein is an Argentine American musician and music therapist. He is a skilled player of a wide range of instruments, such as various types of flutes, accordion, piano, pipe organ, balalaika and acoustic guitar.

He was born in Buenos Aires, Argentina, on February 3, 1950. Apart from his native Spanish, he is fluent in English and Hebrew. His accomplishments appear in the 1998 edition of the Encyclopedia of Venezuelan Music.

He obtained his teaching credentials in 1966 at the Escuela Normal de Profesores "Mariano Acosta". He studied music at the "Carlos L. Buchardo" national music school, as well as the Teatro Colón school of art. He studied harmony and composition under renowned artists such as Carlos L. Puccio and Vivian Tabbush, and electroacoustic music under Adalberto Levy Amra, Javier Raskowan and Jesús Querales.

He obtained his Music Therapy degree from Universidad del Salvador in Buenos Aires in 1971. He obtained a master's degree in Music Therapy, alongside a master's degree in Benenzon Nonverbal Therapy, and a BA and later master's degree in Music Therapy validated by California University FCE. In 2012, he revalidated his Music Therapy degree in the Medical School department at Universidad del Salvador. Goldstein has been recognized as the first male music therapist to graduate in Latin America. Shortly after graduating from USAL, he worked as a teaching assistant to Antonio Yepez in his lectures for the subject Instrumental Techniques and left for Venezuela, where he settled down in 1974.

== Time in South America ==
He lived in Venezuela for 25 years (1975 - 2000), where he filled, among others, the position of music therapist and coordinator of a radio show run by FAJO (a therapeutic community for drug-abusing youths); asAs a Music Therapy teacher at the postgraduate Psychiatry school at El Peñón hospital; as music therapist for adults with communication problems at the Instituto de la Familia, and as a consultant to former Education Minister Luis Manuel Peñalver in the Special Education division, where Goldstein was in charge of creating and supervising music programs for Special Ed children and teenagers throughout Venezuela. He also founded AVEMUS, the Venezuelan Music Therapy Associaction, and was its first president and representative in international music therapy forums. In addition, he worked as a music therapist at the "Monseñor de Talavera" school for special needs children in Venezuela, which focuses on autistic children, children with Down syndrome and children with learning disabilities. He was a Music Therapy teacher at the university of the same name, as well as the prestigious AVEPANE institute. He was a guest teacher at universities such as UCAB and Simón Bolivar University, as well as colleges and universities throughout the country, such as UNELLEZ and Cecilio Acosta University, in Maracaibo. He gave two seminars at Pontificia Universidad Javeriana in Bogotá and a seminar on rhythm and interpretation for the National Colombian Army Military Band.

Two of his symphonic poems and a tango for chamber orchestras he composed were performed by Venezuela's Municipal Symphonic Orchestra in 1999. Goldstein was also a member of the Caracas Municipal Symphony Orchestra, which he had the honour to conduct at several popular music concerts and private and church events. In 2000, Goldstein won the Venezuela Music Award in music composition for cinema and documentaries, which was awarded by the national television broadcaster in Venezuela.

== Time in Los Angeles ==
While living in California, Goldstein worked as a music therapist at the Senior Services area of the International Institute of (2007-2009); as a music therapist and accordion teacher at the San Fernando Music School (2005–2011) and as a coordinator for an investigation project regarding pre-surgery relaxation through music at the Clínica Médica General in Los Ángeles, led by Daniel S. Dunkelman, MD (2000–2008).

As a musician, Goldstein played the bass balalaika in the Los Angeles Balalaika Orchestra under the direction of soloist Irina Orlova. He led the Latin American Chamber Music and Tango project at UCLA.(2008–2012), resulting in the creation of Los Angeles del Tango, a music group that, to this day, showcasing these musical genres in concerts, performances and as accompanying music for dancers. Goldstein was also the musical director of the Jewish Theatre of Hollywood, teacher and guest performer at the Rondalla de Capistrano, Orange County, and served as kapellmeister in several synagogues in Southern California.

In 2011, Pablo Goldstein, alongside poet Karina Galvez and painter Luis Burgos Flor, was one of the only three non-Mexican artists to be invited to commemorate the 125th anniversary of the opening of the Mexican Consulate General in Los Angeles, where he performed Franz Schubert's Ave Maria (Schubert) and several tango pieces for bandoneón adapted to be played with an accordion. He took part in recording sessions with Craig Taubman, Theodor Bikel, Michael Stein, Hugo Waizinger, María Escudero, Dino Saluzzi, Víctor Heredia, Cristina Plate and Miguel Abuelo, among others.

== Return to Buenos Aires ==
Back in Buenos Aires, he worked as a music therapist for psychotic patients at the Instituto de Psicoterapia run by Dr. Curi in Vicente Lopez; he fulfilled the same role at the Instituto Red de Vida in Palermo, where he worked with young patients with different types of addictions. He opened his private working space in 2014. That same year, he was hired by Universidad Maimónides to teach Rhythm at the Phys. Ed. department and by USAL to teach as part of the Music Therapy curriculum.

In 2015, he presented a project aimed at Prevention in Music Therapy called Música en Modo Mayor para la Tercera Edad, which was approved and took place in the Casa Rodolfo Walsh arts centre. It was sponsored by the government of the City of Buenos Aires through its patronage program. Goldstein's project, which was realized in the lapse of a year and a half, consisted of weekly sessions and monthly open shows, each of which had over 150 people in attendance.

As an accordion and flute player, he was part of the Regional Slavic Music Orchestra of the Bieinsky under the direction of Sasha Dunaev. Along some members of this group and over the following years, he played as accompaniment for tenor Victor Betinotti and soprano Liliana Vigo Lima. Nowadays, he is part of the Viejos Amigos quintet, which he founded; he is joined by vocal soloist Mónica Korngold and Kike Guerra (bass), Ricardo Sagastizábal (guitar and Latin American string instruments) and Carlos Fradkin (percussion); Goldstein plays the transverse flute, the Indian flute and the accordion.

His current solo project is Musicoterapia Plus, a Music Therapy and supervision institute, where he sees both private patients and referrals from private and public healthcare providers.
