= What Is Dyslexia? =

2026 animated short film about dyslexia

What is dyslexia?
- Directed by: Kyra Bartley. Design and animation - Art&Graft
- Produced by: Corey Esse; Kate Griggs (executive producer)
- Starring: Hope Day; Jeremy Irons; Liv Tyler; Jaalen Best; Lee Perry
- Music by: Lorne Balfe; Ted Griggs
- Production companies: FINCH; Art&Graft
- Release date: April 25, 2026 (United Kingdom)
- Running time: 5 minutes
- Countries: United Kingdom; Australia
- Language: English

What is dyslexia? is a 2026 animated short film directed by Kyra Bartley, design and animation by Art&Graft. The film, created by Made By Dyslexia, follows Lola, a young girl who searches online for information after learning she has dyslexia. It features the voices of Hope Day, Jeremy Irons, Liv Tyler, Jaalen Best, and Lee Perry.

The film was released as part of a campaign intended to reframe public understanding of dyslexia by presenting it as "a brilliant and different way of thinking".

== Plot ==
Lola, a young girl who has recently learned she is dyslexic, turns to the internet for answers. After finding descriptions that make her feel fearful about her future, she meets an inventor who guides her through a journey of self-discovery. Along the way, Lola encounters historical and cultural figures associated with dyslexic thinking, including Muhammad Ali and Henry Ford.

== Cast ==
- Hope Day as Lola
- Jeremy Irons as The Inventor
- Liv Tyler as The Director
- Jaalen Best as Muhammad Ali
- Lee Perry as Henry Ford

== Production ==
What is dyslexia? was directed by Kyra Bartley and produced by Corey Esse. The film was produced by FINCH, with design and animation by Art&Graft.

The film's visual style is a hybrid animation approach combining traditional 2D techniques, expressive brushwork, varied frame rates, hand-drawn elements, and a 3D pipeline.

The film features music by Lorne Balfe, with an end-credits song by Ted Griggs.

== Release ==
The film premiered in the United Kingdom on 25 April 2026. According to Creative Boom, it premiered at the BFI IMAX in London.

Made By Dyslexia globally launched the film through on YouTube and via the website whatisdyslexia.org and encouraged viewers to review and share it as part of a campaign to influence search results for the phrase "What is dyslexia?".

== Reception ==
Romey Norton of InSession Film described the film as a short animation that "aims to educate without lecturing" and praised its accessible explanation of dyslexia, while noting that some wider issues, including educational support and late diagnosis, were less fully explored.

Battle Royale with Cheese described the film as an educational short that seeks to reframe dyslexia as a different way of thinking rather than a deficit, praising its use of colour, movement, and design.

Jennie Kermode of Eye for Film described the film as "visually delightful" and praised its ability to communicate the emotional experience of dyslexia through animation and metaphor.

Jason Delgado from Film Threat praised the short's visual storytelling and educational message, describing it as an accessible introduction to dyslexia for younger audiences.

Writing for Yahoo Entertainment, Linda Cook wrote, "I have one regret. I stopped teaching some years ago, and now I can't show What Is Dyslexia? in any of my classes."

== Themes ==
The film focuses on dyslexia as a cognitive difference rather than solely a learning difficulty. Made By Dyslexia describes dyslexic thinking as involving strengths such as problem-solving, creative thinking, pattern recognition, spatial reasoning, lateral thinking, and seeing the bigger picture, alongside challenges with reading, writing, spelling, and rote learning.

The film was released alongside wider public discussion about dyslexia and the language used to describe it. The Independent reported that the animation was created to tackle negative attitudes towards dyslexia, citing research from Made By Dyslexia that found many children and families felt existing online descriptions emphasised difficulties over strengths.
