= Luz Rello =

Spanish linguist and computer scientist (born 1984)

- Born: 1984 (age 41–42); Madrid, Spain
- Education: Complutense University of Madrid; University of Wolverhampton; Pompeu Fabra University
- Occupations: Linguist; computer scientist
- Employer: IE University
- Organization: Change Dyslexia
- Known for: Dyslexia research

Luz Rello Sánchez (born 1984) is a Spanish linguist and computer scientist whose research applies natural language processing and machine learning to dyslexia. In 2013 she became the first Spaniard to receive the European Young Researchers' Award, and in 2016 she received the Princess of Girona Foundation Social Award. She founded the social company Change Dyslexia, whose Dytective platform, used by almost 250,000 people in more than 40 countries, won the 2019 UNESCO King Hamad Bin Isa Al-Khalifa Prize for the Use of ICT in Education. Since 2019 she has been an assistant professor at IE University.

== Early life and education ==
Rello was born in Madrid in 1984 and was diagnosed with dyslexia at the age of ten, after a teacher noticed her difficulties at school; as a small child she had memorized books to conceal that she could not read them. She graduated in linguistics from the Complutense University of Madrid in 2008 with the highest marks in Spain for the degree, and a Fundación "la Caixa" scholarship paid for her master's studies. She took the master's degree in natural language processing and human language technology at the University of Wolverhampton in 2010 and a doctorate in computer science at Pompeu Fabra University in 2014, and in 2019 she joined IE University as an assistant professor in the Information Systems Department.

== Research career ==
Her doctoral thesis, DysWebxia: a text accessibility model for people with dyslexia, supervised by Ricardo Baeza-Yates and Horacio Saggion, proposed adapting web texts for dyslexic readers in both form and content; with Clara Bayarri and Azuki Gòrriz she also developed Dyseggxia, a game of word exercises for children with dyslexia. After her doctorate she worked as a researcher at Carnegie Mellon University in the United States.

== Change Dyslexia ==
In 2015 Rello founded Change Dyslexia, a social company that turns her research into tools for people with dyslexia, (Note: Some sources, including her publisher Planeta de Libros, give 2016 as the founding year.) and its Dytective platform has been made available free of charge to schools across Spain with the support of the Fundación "la Caixa". Dytective combines machine learning with computer games to screen for the risk of dyslexia and to work on its symptoms through personalized exercises; by 2022 it had been used more than 325,000 times in Spanish-speaking countries and adopted by more than 400 Spanish public schools, and was the most used online dyslexia screener. By 2022 the platform offered some 40,000 exercises aimed at 24 cognitive skills and was being used in schools in Madrid and Murcia, and in June that year Change Dyslexia was presented with the 2019 UNESCO King Hamad Bin Isa Al-Khalifa Prize for the Use of ICT in Education.

== Awards ==
Rello was the first Spaniard to receive the European Young Researchers' Award, granted by the EuroScience foundation in 2013; the Spanish edition of MIT Technology Review named her Social Innovator of the Year in 2014, she received the Princess of Girona Foundation Award in 2016, Forbes included her in its 30 Under 30 list in 2017, and she is an Ashoka Fellow.

== Writing ==
She has published four books, among them Superar la dislexia (Overcoming dyslexia), released by Planeta, which had reached six editions by 2022.
