= Karina Galvez =

Ecuadorian American poet (born 1964)

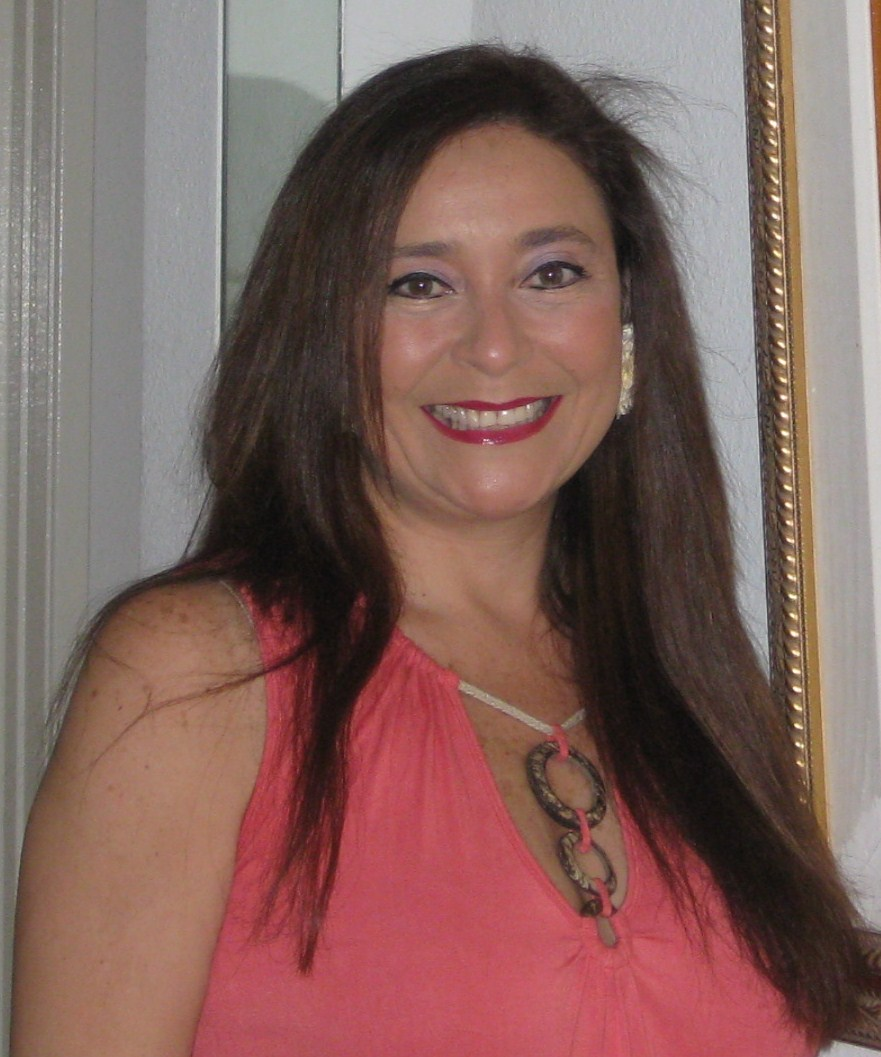
- Born: July 7, 1964 (age 62); Guayaquil, Ecuador
- Citizenship: Ecuador (birthplace), United States.
- Occupation: Poet
- Children: Gabrielle Cobos, Bernardo Cobos, Marcel Cobos
- Writing career
- Notable works: Poesia y Cantares, Juro Que Lo Haré, Poesia en el Pent-house, Guayaquil de Profundis, Epicentro
- Website: www.karinagalvez.com

Karina Galvez (born July 7, 1964) is an Ecuadorian American poet.

== Biography ==
She was born in Guayaquil, Ecuador, July 7, 1964. She lived in California, United States from 1985 to 2012, and returned in 2021, amid the COVID-19 pandemic. From 2012 to 2021, she resided in Ecuador, but flew extensively through the world. In 1995, she published her book "Karina Galvez – Poetry and Songs", which includes both English and Spanish versions of her poems and a prologue written by León Roldós Aguilera, former vice-president of Ecuador. In 1996, her "Poem for My Mother" won 2nd place in the annual Latin American poetry contest organized by the "Casa de la Cultura" in Long Beach, CA. She is also a songwriter and has written children's poems and short children's stories.

She is a Television presenter for "Mesa de Análisis" on UCSG Television de Ecuador, the TV channel of the Universidad Católica de Santiago de Guayaquil, with interviews about Art and Culture; former radio host of "Garza Roja Cultural" and "Garza Roja Musical" on Ecuador's Radio Tropicana 96.5 FM, and radio personality for "Artífices" on UCSG Radio 1190 AM in Guayaquil.

She studied economics at the Catholic University of Santiago de Guayaquil and obtained a degree in tourism at California Travel School. Her knowledge of Spanish, English, French, German, Italian and Portuguese allowed her to share her poetry in several languages. She has been a soprano and a talent for voice overs. One of the pioneers of the Ecuadorian American Chamber of Commerce of Los Angeles. Member of the Ibero-American Society of Poetry of Los Angeles. She is a national disaster trainer for the Orange County American Red Cross, member of the Catholic Detention Ministry in Orange County, CA, Member of DMAT CA-1. Community activist. She received a commendation by Mayor James Hahn of Los Angeles, CA, Mayor Miguel Pulido of Santa Ana, CA, and by California Senator Kevin de León. In October 2008 she was part of the Ecuadorian delegation invited by the Vatican to the Canonization of Narcisa de Jesús Martillo and in April 2014, to the Canonization of Pope John XXIII and Pope John Paul II.

Some of her poems may be found in print and/or online in several Hispano-American anthologies of Poetry and Narrative published in Spain, Mexico, El Salvador, Bolivia, Chile, Brazil, Canada, Romania, the U.K., the U.S., Peru, Slovakia, Bulgaria, Czech Republic and Argentina. Her poems in Spanish have been translated to English, French, Italian, Portuguese, Kichwa, Romanian, Bulgarian, Slovakian and Czech.

"The author was also awarded the "Crystal Condor", top recognition granted to Ecuadorians that have excelled outside national borders, at a ceremony known as the "Ecuadorian Achievement Awards". Karina Galvez was interviewed by Cristina Aceves at KMEX "Los Angeles Al Dia" morning show, and portrayed her poetry in KTNQ live radio shows.

In 2011 Karina Galvez was nominated to the First International Medal of Peace and Culture "Presidente Salvador Allende", in Chile. Also in 2011, Galvez, together with musician Pablo Goldstein and painter Luis Burgos Flor, was one of the only three non-Mexican artists to be invited to commemorate the 125th anniversary of the opening of the Consulate General of Mexico in Los Angeles, where her poem "Ave, Mi Guadalupana" debuted with Goldstein playing Franz Schubert's Ave Maria (Schubert) on bandoneón in the background.

On March 1, 2016, Galvez along with Toño Escobar from Fundación BienvenidoGYE were David Rockefeller's hosts and guides on his visit to Guayaquil, Ecuador.

"The Avowal", the English version in micro-theatre format of Karina Galvez' monologue "I Swear I Will" (about domestic violence) debuted on June 9, 2017, at the CEN (Centro Ecuatoriano Norte-Americano) in Urdesa, Guayaquil, directed by Argentinian theatre director Victor Acebedo.

On October 23, 2017, the Major Council of Chiefs and Communes of Chiloé (in Chiloé Archipelago, in Los Lagos Region, Chile) through Resolution #7, granted Karina Galvez the title of "Williche de Chiloé Por Gracia" (Williche of Chiloé by Grace), to acknowledge her work for Latin American culture and for the Williche people around the world, a title that essentially means that she was received as a member of the Huilliche people.

"Guayaquil de Profundis", Galvez' book commemorating the 200th anniversary of the Independence of Guayaquil October 9 Revolution, was presented at the 17th annual International Book Fair of Lawrence, MA in October 2023.

Her digital album "En Cada Ritmo" was launched in August 8, 2026 with her musicalized poems, lyrics and music by Karina Galvez, in varied rhythms including salsa music, merengue music, cumbia, gospel music, a birthday song, and children songs, and her English version of Las Mañanitas in lullaby style.. The album was produced by ECUASOUND Productions in Hollywood, CA in 2026.

Although her poetry is mostly romantic, Karina Gálvez often surprises the reader with poems and Prose poetry that reflect an acute perception of social issues like abortion, social class clashes, social turmoil, and lack of tolerance, or with poems of profound historical content, like her epic poem "La Batalla del Pichincha" ('The Battle of Pichincha'), or about Catholic beliefs, like her poem "Ave, Mi Guadalupana" that tells of the apparitions of Our Lady of Guadalupe, or with eco-poems (poems about the ecology), Tongue-twisters, and even 'culinary poems' containing traditional Ecuadorian recipes in rhyme.

"This author was also recognized with the Crystal Condor, top award given at the 'Ecuadorian Achievement Awards' to an Ecuadorian who shines beyond the boundaries of Ecuador". "La autora tambien ha sido reconocida con el Condor de Cristal, maximo galardon otorgado a los ecuatorianos que sobresalen fuera de la frontera nacional, en el certamen conocido como 'Ecuadorian Achievement Awards' ".

== Works ==
=== Poetry ===
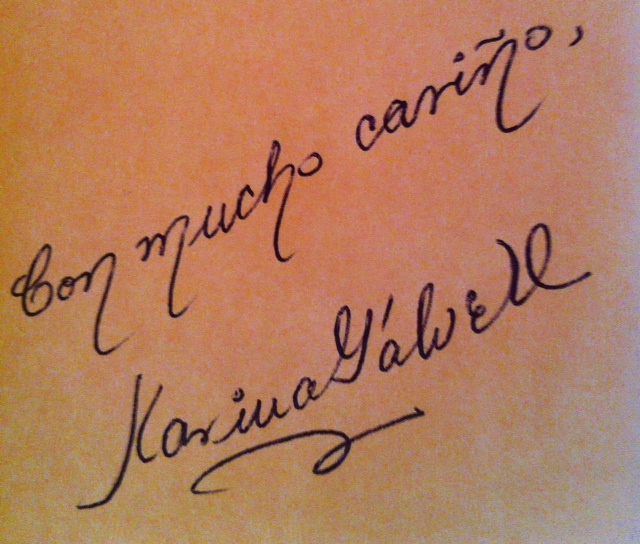
Poet Karina Galvez' signature and dedication

- Poesia y Cantares, 1995.
- Poem for my mother (Poema para mi Madre). Premio Casa de la Cultura de Long Beach, 1996.
- Eres el comienzo y el final de mi poesia. Premio Casa de la Cultura de Long Beach, 1997.
- Ese, Su Guayaquil Viejo. 1995
- Como me gustaria.
- Mis Montañas, las de California.
- Poesia en el Pent-house, 2015
- La Batalla del Pichincha.
- Amor a la Ecuatoriana.
- Epicentro, 2016
- Guayaquil de Profundis, 2023
- Ave, Mi Guadalupana.
- Bienvenido a Guayaquil. Song.
- Guayalenguas. Tongue-twister.
- Caldo de Bolas de Verde. Recipe in rhyme.
- The Earth We Dismembered.

==== Poesía y Cantares ====
"Poesía y Cantares" ("Poetry and Songs"). Poetry book published in 1995 by Ecuadorian poet Karina Galvez. It contains English and Spanish versions of Galvez' poems. Foreword for the book was written by Leon Roldos Aguilera, former vice-president of Ecuador. 106 pages. Most poems are love poems, but poems about Guayaquil, California, and children's poems were also included.

==== Juro Que Lo Hare/The Avowal ====
Monologue about Domestic Violence, written in 2014. Adapted to Spanish-speaking, English-speaking, French, and Italian audiences, in full and micro-theatre versions.

==== Poesia en el Pent-house ====
Poetry book published in 2015 and presented in Romania during the "Curtea de Arges Poetry Nights" International Festival, organized by the International Academy Orient-Occident. Her poem "Me Vestiré de Rosa para tu Funeral" received a Mention of Honor and appeared in Romanian newspapers.

==== Epicentro ====
Poetry book published in 2016 in remembrance of the April 16, 2016 7.8 Earthquake in Ecuador. It contains Bulgarian and Spanish versions of Galvez' poems. It was presented in Bulgaria, Slovakia, and the Czech Republic.

==== Guayaquil de Profundis ====
Poetry and Culture book written in 2020 in commemoration of the 200th Independence of Guayaquil. Presented in Massachusetts in 2023.

==== En Cada Ritmo ====
Music album with lyrics and music by poet/song-writer Karina Galvez, launched on August 8, 2026 in Hollywood, California.

=== Children's poems, stories and songs ===
- The Little Southern Star (La Estrellita del Sur).
- Once upon a time, there was a duck (Habia una vez un pato).
- El Tornillo de Guayaquil, a fable-poem about a skyrise named "The Point", but known as "El Tornillo" ("The Screw"), in Guayaquil, Ecuador.
- Canción de los Colores, a children's song to teach the colors in Spanish.

=== Prose poetry ===
- Ecuador que Duele.
