= Kate Griggs =

British social entrepreneur

- Born: Somerset, England
- Occupation: Social entrepreneur

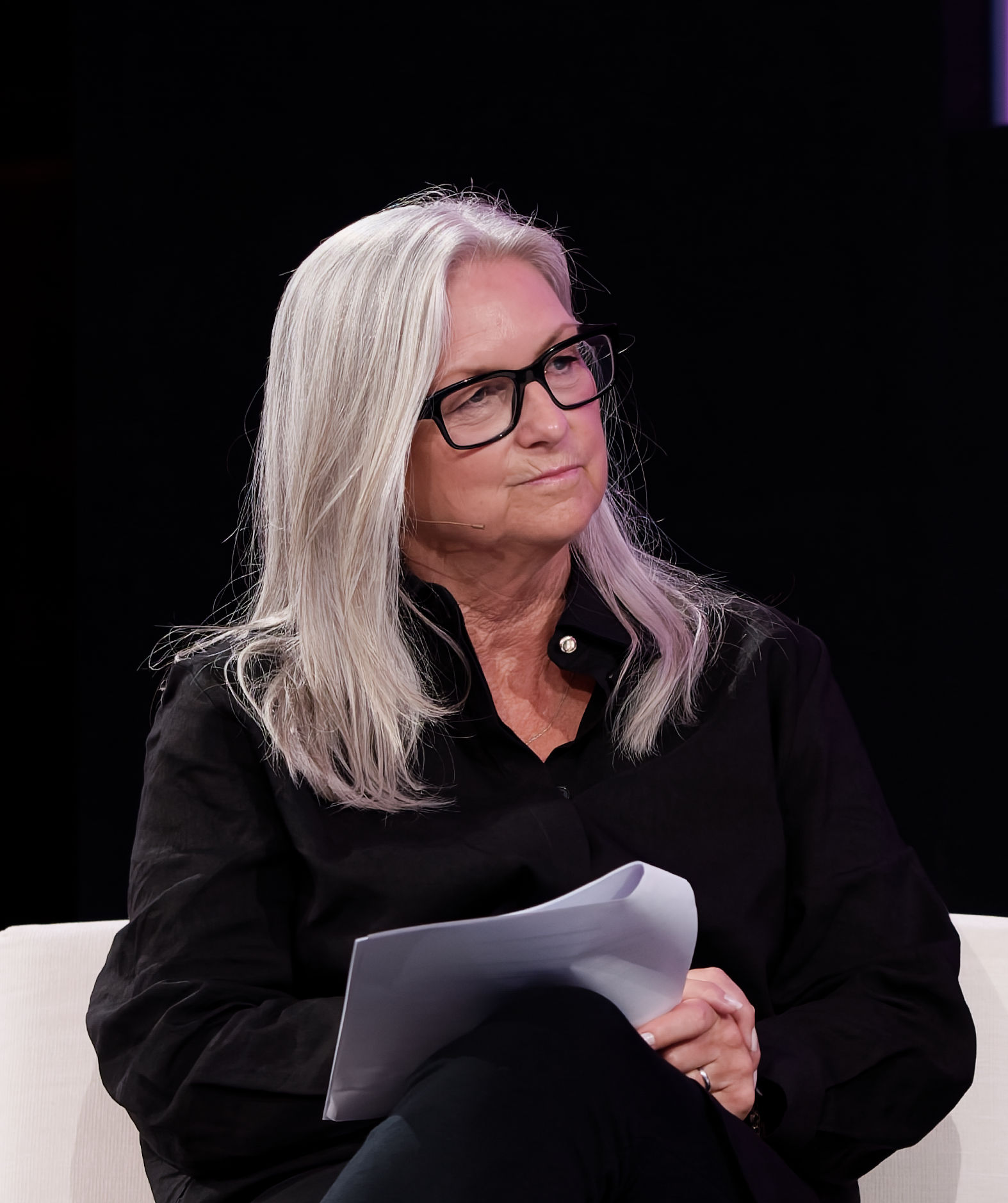
Griggs in 2026

Kate Griggs is a British social entrepreneur, author, campaigner and founder of the charity, Made By Dyslexia. She is the author of the books, This Is Dyslexia and Xtraordinary People, the host of the podcast Lessons In Dyslexic Thinking and the Executive Producer of the short film, "What Is Dyslexia?. Griggs has also produced and presented training programmes for education with Microsoft Learn and The Open University and the workplace in partnership with LinkedIn Learning.

== Biography ==
Griggs is dyslexic and has spoken publicly about her experiences as a dyslexic and as the mother of two dyslexic sons. She founded Made By Dyslexia with the aim of increasing awareness and understanding of the strengths and challenges of dyslexia in schools, workplaces and homes.

Made By Dyslexia is supported by a number of well known dyslexics, including Richard Branson, Jamie Oliver, Orlando Bloom and Keira Knightley.

Griggs stood unsuccessfully against the Education Secretary Ruth Kelly in the 2005 general election, coming last with 74 votes.

From 2005, Griggs worked with the government, including giving evidence to the Education Select Committee SEN Review, "Rose Review on Reading", the "Rose Review on Dyslexia" and the 2020 Personalised Learning Review. She has also written for the Commons/Lords House Magazine, Conservatives Crossbow magazine and is regularly featured in national newspapers and television appearances including GMTV, BBC1, BBC Breakfast, Newsnight, Channel 4, Sky and 5 News.

In 2006, BBC1 produced a one-hour documentary about her work in a South London "sink" school, working with 11-year-olds who had failed their SATS and gone off the rails.

In April 2007 Griggs was awarded the SMK Social Inclusion Award presented in Downing Street by Gordon Brown, patron of SMK, the awards charity. In May 2007 the DCSF funded Xtraordinary People's "No to Failure" project which demonstrated the need for effective support for children with dyslexia in UK schools. Their report, released in 2008, found 55% of children failing SATS to be at risk of dyslexia. In September 2008, Griggs spoke at the Conservative Party Conference, highlighting the educational needs of dyslexics.

== Xtraordinary People ==
In 2004, Griggs formed Xtraordinary People. XP is a charitable initiative supported by famous dyslexics and leading dyslexia charities alike. Its main aim is to reframe the way people think about dyslexia, highlighting dyslexic children's talents and strengths. Xtraordinary People has been instrumental in reforming the education system, specifically campaigning for teachers to be trained to recognise and support dyslexic children's abilities and difficulties.

In March 2007, Xtraordinary People's "No to Failure" report revealed that 55% of children who fail their Standard Assessment Tests (SATS) are at risk of dyslexia or specific learning difficulties (SpLD).

In May 2008, Xtraordinary People released the "Spelling it Out" report highlighting the cost to the nation of not dealing with dyslexia. It found that £1.8bn is wasted each year that Government fails to ensure schools meet the needs of dyslexic children.

Xtraordinary People called for the Government to follow the example of independent schools by investing in tried and tested dyslexia specialists, as research indicates dyslexia and Specific Learning Difficulties (SpLD) is one of the biggest reasons for educational failure in this country, affecting as many as one in five children. In 2008 the Government announced that Sir Jim Rose would undertake a review into how dyslexic children are being supported in schools. The report was published in June 2009 and supported the need for early identification of dyslexia and intervention by dyslexia specialists. The Government accepted the review's findings and allocated £10 million on a national program to provide 4000 dyslexia specialist teachers. They estimate one teacher to every 5 schools.

== Awards ==
In April 2007 Griggs was awarded the ‘SMK Social Inclusion Award’ presented in Downing Street by Gordon Brown, patron of SMK, the awards charity

== Media ==
In the 2005 Party Elections, Griggs stood against then Education Secretary Ruth Kelly to focus the Government's attention on how schools were failing dyslexics. The resulting media attention made a significant difference to Griggs’ campaign, affording her the opportunity to speak out on behalf of dyslexic children and their parents.

In 2005, Griggs appeared on GMTV to challenge Professor Julian Elliott about his claims that dyslexia was a myth. In 2006, BBC1 produced a one-hour documentary about her work in a South London "sink" school, working with 11-year-olds who had failed their SATS and gone off the rails. After support from the charity, all children made dramatic progress.

In January 2007, Griggs was quoted in The Times in an article about funding for Special Needs Children. In November 2007, Griggs was quoted in The Times in an article claiming that research showed that Entrepreneurs in Britain are twice as likely to be dyslexic as the general population, but are much less likely than their American counterparts In March 2008, Griggs was quoted in The Times in an article discussing the fact that half of children who fail key school tests are likely to have dyslexia or other learning difficulties.

In January 2009, Griggs was quoted in The Times and The Guardian, when Graham Stringer, the Labour MP for Manchester Blackley, wrote in his column for Manchester Confidential magazine: “Dyslexia is a cruel fiction, it is no more real than the 19th-century scientific construction of ‘the aether’ to explain how light travels through a vacuum.”
