= Sara Rankin =

Professor of Leukocyte and Stem Cell Biology

Sara Rankin FRSB
- Born: Sara Margaret Rankin
- Education: King's College London (BSc, PhD)
- Scientific career
- Workplaces: Imperial College London; University of California, San Diego
- Thesis: The modification, uptake and degradation of low density lipoproteins by macrophages : and the effects of drugs and chemicals on these processes (1989)
- Website: imperial.ac.uk/people/s.rankin

Sara Margaret Rankin FRSB is a professor of Leukocyte and Stem Cell Biology at Imperial College London. She is known for her work in stimulating endogenous bone marrow stem cells to repair the body. Rankin identifies as being neurodiverse.

== Personal life ==
After visiting the Bristol Radiotherapy Centre as a teenager, Rankin knew she wanted a career in research. Since 2011, Rankin has identified as being neurodiverse, with characteristics of dyslexia and dyspraxia.

== Education ==
Rankin received first class honours for a BSc in pharmacology at King's College London in 1985. Rankin continued at the same institution for her PhD, completing in 1989.

== Research ==
After her PhD, Rankin moved to the University of California, San Diego as a postdoctoral research fellow. She joined Imperial as a postdoctoral researcher in 1992.

As of 2018, Rankin is based in the Faculty of Medicine at the National Heart and Lung Institute (NHLI), where she was appointed Professor in 2010. Rankin and her team are trying to navigate the mesenchymal stem cells found in bone marrow to injured sites around the body, where they can promote regeneration in nearby tissue and dampen the immune system. The regulated movement of stem cells from bone marrow to sites of tissue damage could treat broken bones or heart disease.

She is the lead for biology and therapeutics at the Blast Injury Centre at Imperial College London, where she studies heterotopic ossification. She is a leader of the London Stem Cell Network. Rankin holds research grants from the Wellcome Trust, European Commission and British Legion.

=== Public engagement ===
Rankin is the NHLI division lead for Outreach and engagement. She is the co-founder of The Curious Act, a science public engagement initiative who run creative science-based activities for the public. In 2011, she collaborated with Gina Czarnecki, acting as the lead scientist in "Wasted". In 2012 Czarnecki and Rankin created Palaces, a crystal resin sculpture embedded with milk teeth donated by children across the UK.

Rankin and The Curious Act have hosted a number of science-themed pop-up shops. The Heart and Lung Repair Shop, a two-week pop-up science shop in Hammersmith's Kings Mall, opened in July 2014. The Heart and Lung Convenience Store opened in Hammersmith in 2015.

In 2017 Rankin launched 2eMpowerUK, which runs STEM workshops for neurodiverse teenagers.

=== Honours and awards ===
Her awards and honours include:

- 2016 Imperial College London Collaboration Award for Societal Engagement
- 2011 Wellcome Trust Senior Investigator Award
- 2010 Imperial College London Rector's Award for Excellence in Pastoral Care
- 2019 Imperial College Julia Higgins Award for contribution to gender equality
