= Kiss of the Spider Woman (soundtrack) =

Kiss of the Spider Woman (Original Motion Picture Soundtrack)

Soundtrack album / cast recording by Jennifer Lopez, Diego Luna and Tonatiuh
- Released: October 3, 2025
- Recorded: 2024–2025
- Length: 59:47
- Label: Lakeshore
- Producer: Matt Sullivan

Jennifer Lopez, Diego Luna and Tonatiuh chronology
This Is Me... Now (2024)	Kiss of the Spider Woman (Original Motion Picture Soundtrack) (2025)

Kiss of the Spider Woman soundtracks chronology
Katy Keene: Special Episode – Kiss of the Spider Woman: The Musical (Original Television Soundtrack) (2020)	Kiss of the Spider Woman (Original Motion Picture Soundtrack) (2025)

Kiss of the Spider Woman (Original Motion Picture Soundtrack) is the soundtrack album to the 2025 film Kiss of the Spider Woman directed by Bill Condon, which is based on the stage musical by Terrence McNally, John Kander, and Fred Ebb, and stars Jennifer Lopez, Diego Luna and Tonatiuh. The album featured musical performances from the cast members, written and composed by the Kander and Ebb duo while the incidental underscore is composed by Sam Davis. The album was preceded by three promotional singles: the title track "Kiss of the Spider Woman", "She's a Woman" and "Never You", which were released on September 5 and 19, 2025. The album was released through Lakeshore Records on October 3, 2025.

== Background ==
The soundtrack to Kiss of the Spider Woman featured original numbers from the musical composed and written by John Kander and Fred Ebb. Sam Davis underscored the film's incidental music, while the songs were performed by Lopez, Luna and Tonatiuh. Most of the musical numbers were recorded live as well as pre-recorded. Condon noted that he went back-and-forth with Lopez on the recording of the songs live, where he "don't necessarily subscribe to the idea that someone singing live in their throat is necessarily what is ideal for movies. The sweet spot is somewhere in the middle." Most of the songs were filmed in a single take, similar to Hollywood musicals were performed.

== Release ==
The album was preceded by the first promotional single—the title track "Kiss of the Spider Woman" performed by Lopez, was released on September 5, 2025. The second promotional single "Never You" was released on September 19. The album was released through Lakeshore Records on October 3, a week ahead of the film's release. It is also scheduled to be released in physical CDs on November 14, and in vinyl LPs on December 12.

== Reception ==
Carla Meyer of San Francisco Chronicle wrote "the songs are mere sketches designed to be filled in by Broadway-baby belting" with Tonatiuh's voice being "rich and resonant" and Lopez's "voice sounds fine on heavily produced dance tracks, but there is no obscuring its thinness here." Moira Macdonald of The Seattle Times wrote "Music, as "Kiss of the Spider Woman" reminds us, can break our hearts; it can also, like a hand grasped in the darkness, give us strength." David Rooney of The Hollywood Reporter wrote "Few of the songs are essential in terms of advancing the plot, but they provide wry commentary and riotous color". Benjamin Lee of The Guardian wrote "The songs themselves, from legendary Cabaret and Chicago duo Kander and Ebb, are largely rather forgettable with some often distractingly ungainly lyrics (an earworm exception is the fantastically slinky title song)". Ryan Lattanzio of IndieWire wrote "the songs are unfortunately (sorry) hardly memorable". Kai Swanson of MovieWeb wrote "The score by John Kander and Fred Ebb (of Cabaret and Chicago fame) is as lush and theatrical as one would expect, but on screen, it feels oddly muted."

== Track listing ==
No.	Title	Artist(s)	Length
1.	"Overture"	Sam Davis	4:51
2.	"Prologue"	Jennifer Lopez	1:25
3.	"Her Name Is Aurora" (Staff)	Tonatiuh; Aurora's Staff	0:46
4.	"I Will Dance Alone"	Lopez; Tonatiuh	1:44
5.	"Her Name Is Aurora" (Gala)	Lopez	2:31
6.	"An Everyday Man"	Diego Luna; Lopez	3:07
7.	"She's a Woman"	Tonatiuh	2:46
8.	"Where You Are"	Lopez; Tonatiuh	4:40
9.	"Dear One / Querido"	Federico Salles; Alejandro Ernesto Balbis Ortiz	2:01
10.	"I Do Miracles"	Lopez; Josefina Scaglione	3:25
11.	"Soon I Feel It"	Lopez	0:46
12.	"A Visit"	Lopez; Tonatiuh	2:59
13.	"Gimme Love"	Lopez	3:11
14.	"Never You"	Lopez	2:12
15.	"Kiss of the Spider Woman"	Lopez	2:40
16.	"Her Name Is Aurora" (Finale)	Kiss of the Spider Woman Chorus	2:46
17.	"Anything for Him" (Instrumental)	Davis	1:38
18.	"Only in the Movies"	Tonatiuh	5:14
19.	"Dear One" (End Credits)	Davis	2:02
20.	"The One Hot Spot in Town"	Davis	1:44
21.	"Over the Wall / Desiderio"	Davis	2:23
22.	"Carnival"	Davis	2:06
23.	"Armando Leaves"	Davis	1:33
24.	"Come Out" (Bonus Track)	Mariano Condoluci	1:31
Total length:			59:47

== Release history ==
Release history and formats for Kiss of the Spider Woman (Original Motion Picture Soundtrack)
Region	Date	Format(s)	Label(s)	Ref.
Various	October 3, 2025	Digital download; streaming	Lakeshore Records	
Various	November 14, 2025	CD	Lakeshore Records	
Various	December 12, 2025	LP	Lakeshore Records	
