= Kiss of the Spider Woman (1985 film) =

Film by Héctor Babenco

- Theatrical release poster
- Directed by: Héctor Babenco
- Screenplay by: Leonard Schrader
- Based on: Kiss of the Spider Woman by Manuel Puig
- Produced by: David Weisman
- Starring: William Hurt; Raul Julia; Sônia Braga; José Lewgoy; Milton Gonçalves; Denise Dumont
- Cinematography: Rodolfo Sánchez
- Edited by: Mauro Alice
- Music by: Nando Carneiro; John Neschling; Wally Badarou
- Production companies: FilmDallas Pictures; Sugarloaf Films; HB Filmes
- Distributed by: Island Alive (United States); Embrafilme (Brazil)
- Release dates: May 13, 1985 (Cannes); July 26, 1985 (United States); March 13, 1986 (Brazil)
- Running time: 121 minutes
- Countries: Brazil; United States
- Languages: English; Portuguese
- Budget: $1.5 million
- Box office: $17 million

Kiss of the Spider Woman (Portuguese: O Beijo da Mulher-Aranha) is a 1985 dystopian drama film directed by Héctor Babenco from a screenplay by Leonard Schrader, based on the 1976 novel by Argentine author Manuel Puig. It stars William Hurt, Raul Julia, Sônia Braga, José Lewgoy, Milton Gonçalves, and Denise Dumont.

Set in a Brazilian prison during the military dictatorship, the film centers on a dialogue between two very different cellmates, a hardened leftist revolutionary (Julia) and an apolitical gay man (Hurt). The story utilizes metafictional and film-within-a-film elements, as the latter regales the former with retellings of an old movie, whose themes mirror those of the characters.

Independently produced, principal photography occurred in São Paulo between October 1983 and March 1984.

Kiss of the Spider Woman premiered on May 13, 1985, at the 1985 Cannes Film Festival, where Hurt won the Best Actor award and Babenco was nominated for the Palme d'Or. The film was released in the United States on July 26, 1985, and in Brazil on March 13, 1986. It received critical acclaim. Hurt won the Academy Award and BAFTA for Best Actor, and the film was nominated for further three Academy Awards, including the first Best Picture nomination for a Brazilian production, the first Best Director nomination for a Brazilian filmmaker, and Best Adapted Screenplay. It was also nominated for the Golden Globe Award for Best Motion Picture – Drama, in addition to Best Actor in a Motion Picture – Drama (Hurt and Julia) and Best Supporting Actress – Motion Picture (Braga).

In 1992, Terrence McNally adapted the novel and film into a stage musical of the same name starring Chita Rivera in the title role. It won the 1993 Tony Award for Best Musical, Best Book of a Musical, and Best Original Score. Further, a musical film adaptation was released in 2025, with Jennifer Lopez, Tonatiuh and Diego Luna in the lead roles.

== Plot ==
The film centers on a dialogue between two very different individuals who share a prison cell during the Brazilian military dictatorship: Valentin Arregui, who is imprisoned (and has been tortured) due to his activities on behalf of a leftist revolutionary group, and Luis Molina, a gay man in prison for "corrupting an underage youth."

Molina passes the time by recounting memories from one of his favorite films, a wartime romantic thriller that is also a Nazi propaganda film. He weaves the characters into a narrative meant to comfort Valentin and distract him from the harsh realities of political imprisonment and separation from his lover, Marta. Valentin encourages Molina to have self-respect and opens him up to political commitment. Despite Valentin's occasionally snapping at Molina over his shallow views of film-watching and unrealistic romance, an unlikely friendship develops between the two.

Over time, it becomes clear that Valentin is being poisoned by his jailers to provide Molina with a chance to befriend him, and that Molina is spying on Valentin on behalf of the secret police. Molina has apparently been promised parole if he succeeds in obtaining information that will allow the secret police to break up the revolutionary group.

Molina admits that he has fallen in love with Valentin, and they have sex. Unbeknownst to them, this occurs on Molina's final night in prison, as he has been granted parole in a surprise move by the secret police. Valentin provides Molina with a telephone number and a message for his comrades. Molina at first refuses to take the number, fearing the consequences of treason, but he relents, bidding Valentin farewell with a kiss.

Now out of prison, Molina calls the telephone number, and a meeting is arranged with the revolutionary group. But the secret police have had Molina under surveillance, and at the rendezvous, a gun battle occurs, with the revolutionaries shooting Molina. As he wanders the streets wounded, the secret police catch him and demand the telephone number, but Molina refuses and dies. On the orders of the police chief, the policemen dump Molina's body in a rubbish pit and fabricate a story about his death and his presumed collaboration with the revolutionary group.

In the prison, Valentin is being treated after being tortured. After a sympathetic doctor risks his job by administering morphine to help him sleep, Valentin appears to succumb to his wounds and perhaps die, when he suddenly finds himself running out of prison with Marta and appearing on an idyllic tropical island with her. Valentin and Marta row away on a boat into the distance.

== Cast ==
- William Hurt as Luis Molina
- Raul Julia as Valentin Arregui
- Sônia Braga as Leni Lamaison/Marta/Spider Woman
- José Lewgoy as Warden
- Milton Gonçalves as Secret Policeman
- Miriam Pires as Molina's mother
- Nuno Leal Maia as Gabriel, Molina's friend
- Fernando Torres as Américo
- Patricio Bisso as Greta
- Herson Capri as Werner, Leni's German lover and Chief of Counter-Intelligence in movie fantasy
- Denise Dumont as Michelle, Leni's best friend in movie fantasy
- Nildo Parente as Leader of Resistance in movie fantasy
- Antônio Petrin as Clubfoot, Resistance fighter in movie fantasy
- Wilson Grey as Flunky, Resistance fighter in movie fantasy
- Miguel Falabella as Lieutenant
- Ana Braga as Lidia, Valentin's girlfriend
- Sergio Kato as Martim, Molina's friend

== Background ==
The film is based on the 1976 novel El beso de la mujer araña (Kiss of the Spider Woman) by Manuel Puig. The Argentine author was the first to adapt his own novel as a stage play. A Broadway musical of the same name, also based on the novel, was produced in 1993.

== Production ==
=== Development ===
As noted in Puig's 2001 biography, Manuel Puig and the Spider Woman: His Life and Fictions, the novel was banned in Argentina, and the English translation edition preceded a widespread publication in Spanish. The novel was considered for a film adaptation by Rainer Werner Fassbinder and other directors. In 1981, Argentine-born director Héctor Babenco was in Los Angeles, to accept an award from the Los Angeles Film Critics Association for his breakout feature film, Pixote. At the reception, Los Angeles Times critic Kevin Thomas asked Babenco about his future projects, and the director mentioned his desire to adapt Puig's novel, starring Burt Lancaster. The actor was in attendance at the event, and Thomas introduced him to Babenco.

When Lancaster expressed interest, Babenco initially doubted his seriousness, but promised to send him a copy of the novel. Several days later, Lancaster's assistant telephoned Babenco to make sure Kiss of the Spider Woman was in the mail, and the director sent it right away. The two met in the coming weeks at the New York Critics’ award ceremony, and Lancaster committed to the role of Molina.

Babenco met American producer David Weisman in early 1982 through a mutual friend to discuss bringing “Latin American magical realism” into the mainstream. Although Lancaster was attached, giving it built-in marketability, the novel's non-traditional narrative made it a challenge to adapt, and its homosexual theme was perceived as a detriment to attracting mainstream audiences. Babenco, who was an expatriate in Brazil at that time, feared a xenophobic backlash against the production for casting American actors. Additional obstacles to the production included Manuel Puig's antagonism toward Babenco; he did not like Pixote, and suspected the director was an “opportunist.”

=== Pre-production ===
Babenco continued to develop the property despite the author's misgivings, and attracted potential investors, including German filmmaker Frank Ripploh. Richard Gere was set to play Valentin, giving the production further box-office credibility. New York City socialite Jane Holzer, who appeared in several Andy Warhol films and was an acquaintance of David Weisman, agreed to finance initial production costs, and Leonard Schrader, who had collaborated with his brother, Paul Schrader, on The Yakuza, was hired to write the script. However, Babenco remained wary of anglicizing the source material, and was relieved by the casting of Puerto Rican actor Raul Julia, who replaced Richard Gere.

Meanwhile, rumors circulated in the press that Lancaster had a penchant for cross-dressing, and Babenco attempted to dispel the scandal at the Cannes Film Festival by telling a French gay tabloid that he did not know Lancaster was homosexual when he was cast. Although Babenco intended to imply that Lancaster was not gay, and his sexual orientation had nothing to do with the actor's involvement with the film, his statement was taken out of context when it was published, and prompted further inquisition into Lancaster's personal life. This, along with Lancaster's advancing age, and a heart bypass operation in Apr 1983, caused the production to be delayed, and the filmmakers turned to William Hurt as a replacement. The morning after Hurt consented to the role, Weisman and Babenco met with independent producer Ray Stark, whose company, Rastar, had been acquired by Columbia Pictures. Stark agreed to take on the project at that time, but neither he nor Columbia are credited onscreen.

The picture's expected $1.5 million budget was financed in part by Brazil's Embrafilme, which purchased Brazilian distribution rights for $160,000. Below-the-line expenses were raised by Babenco's HB Filmes, and international production services were funded by Weisman's Sugarloaf Films, Inc. The crew was mainly Brazilian, accompanied by several Argentine-born craftsmen. Rehearsals took place in a São Paulo prison that had been vacated in the wake of riots, and sets were constructed at Vera Cruz Studios, which had been abandoned due to bankruptcy.

=== Writing ===
The film's setting was relocated from Argentina to Brazil, with the added political context of the then-current Brazilian military dictatorship.

The story features a "film within a film", featuring Luis Molina episodically telling Valentin Arregui the plot of a fictional film called Her Real Glory ostensibly produced in Germany during Second World War by the Nazis.

While the book alludes to five motion pictures, the film version focuses on a single Nazi propaganda movie. Puig biographer Suzanne Jill Levine identified the film as a compilation of various Third Reich productions with the American Paris Underground and Die große Liebe (The Great Love), a 1942 film starring Zarah Leander as a cabaret singer who falls in love with a German air force pilot. Leander was the model for the Kiss of the Spider Woman’s “Leni Lamaison,” who was named after propaganda filmmaker Leni Riefenstahl.

=== Filming ===
Principal photography began October 13, 1983 in São Paulo, Brazil. Since Babenco "rarely" spoke English, Hurt took direction from him via an assistant director. Hurt and Julia had agreed to work for the Screen Actors Guild pay scale, and deferred the greater portion of their salaries for a profit-share in the sale of the film's distribution rights, as well as its box-office gross. While Babenco and Weisman were also working for the same “deferred investment plan,” other players, including actress Sônia Braga, opted to be paid upfront. During filming in Brazil, Hurt and a friend were threatened at gunpoint but were let go several hours later.

== Release ==
=== Critical response ===
The film received positive reviews. Review aggregation website Rotten Tomatoes gives it a rating of 88% based on reviews from 40 critics. The site's consensus states; "Kiss of the Spider Woman weaves an alluring exploration of sexual and societal norms that's further elevated by strong work from William Hurt and Raul Julia." Metacritic, which uses a weighted average, assigned the film a score of 80 out of 100, based on 10 critics, indicating "generally favorable" reviews.

Roger Ebert gave the film three and a half stars out of four, calling it a "film of insights and surprises" and remarking that "the performances are wonderful." James Berardinelli gave Kiss of the Spider Woman three stars out of four, calling it "a fascinating character study." Reviewing the film in 2009, Berardinelli claimed that it "has lost none of its power over the years," and felt that while it was not the best film of 1985, it was more deserving of the Best Picture Academy Award than Out of Africa.

In 2015, the Brazilian Film Critics Association voted Kiss of the Spider Woman the 61st greatest Brazilian film of all time, in its list of the 100 best Brazilian films.

=== Home media ===
The DVD version contains a bonus disc with a 108-minute documentary (accessible in English via subtitles) Tangled Web: Making 'Kiss of the Spider Woman' (2008). The documentary treats the making of the film, the careers of the writers, actors and producers, and the post-production history of the film.

The Criterion Collection released the film on 4K UHD and Blu-ray on January 27, 2026, carrying over the Tangled Web documentary as a special feature.

== Accolades ==
William Hurt won the Academy Award for Best Actor. The film was also nominated for Best Picture (the first independently produced film that was), Best Director, and Best Adapted Screenplay. Hurt also won Best Actor at the BAFTA Awards, the 1985 Cannes Film Festival and several other festivals. The film was awarded the inaugural Golden Space Needle award from the Seattle International Film Festival. Hurt and Julia won a joint award for Best Actor from the National Board of Review.

Award	Category	Recipient	Result
58th Academy Awards	Best Picture	David Weisman	Nominated
58th Academy Awards	Best Director	Héctor Babenco	Nominated
58th Academy Awards	Best Actor	William Hurt	Won
58th Academy Awards	Best Adapted Screenplay	Leonard Schrader	Nominated
39th British Academy Film Awards	Best Actor in a Leading Role	William Hurt	Won
43rd Golden Globe Awards	Best Motion Picture – Drama	—N/a	Nominated
43rd Golden Globe Awards	Best Actor in a Motion Picture – Drama	William Hurt	Nominated
43rd Golden Globe Awards	Best Actor in a Motion Picture – Drama	Raul Julia	Nominated
43rd Golden Globe Awards	Best Supporting Actress – Motion Picture	Sônia Braga	Nominated
1st Independent Spirit Awards	Special Distinction Award	—N/a	Won
1986 David di Donatello Awards	Best Foreign Actor	William Hurt	Won

=== Film festival ===
Award	Category	Recipient	Result
1985 Cannes Film Festival	Best Actor	William Hurt	Won
1985 Cannes Film Festival	Palme d'Or	Héctor Babenco	Nominated
1985 Seattle International Film Festival	Golden Space Needle	—N/a	Won
1st Tokyo International Film Festival	Special Jury Distinguished Award	Héctor Babenco	Won
1987 SESC Film Festival	Audience Award for Best Film	Héctor Babenco	Won

=== Critics awards ===
Award	Category	Recipient	Result
National Board of Review	Best Actor	William Hurt	Won
National Board of Review	Best Actor	Raul Julia	Won
National Board of Review	Top Ten Films	—N/a	Won
National Society of Film Critics	Best Actor	William Hurt	Nominated
Los Angeles Film Critics Association	Best Actor	William Hurt	Won
New York Film Critics Circle	Best Actor	William Hurt	Nominated
London Film Critics' Circle	Actor of the Year	William Hurt	Won

== Musical film adaptation ==
In December 2023, Jennifer Lopez was announced to star in a film adaptation of Terrence McNally, John Kander and Fred Ebb's 1992 Broadway musical adaptation of the novel with Bill Condon as writer and director. The independently financed production was executive produced by Lopez, Elaine Goldsmith-Thomas and Benny Medina through their Nuyorican Productions banner, while Barry Josephson, Tom Kirdahy, Greg Yolen and Matt Geller served as producers and Sergio Trujillo choreographed the musical sequences. Upon the announcement, a casting call opened for an unknown to play the role of Molina. Filming began in New Jersey in March 2024. In April 2024, Diego Luna and Tonatiuh joined the cast as Valentin and Molina respectively, with Ben Affleck and Matt Damon joining the producing team under their Artists Equity banner. It premiered at the 2025 Sundance Film Festival on January 26, 2025 to a standing ovation from the audience.
