= Kiss of the Spider Woman (play) =

1985 stage adaption by Manuel Puig

- Written by: Manuel Puig
- Characters: Valentin; Molina
- Original language: English
- Genre: Drama
- Setting: Villa Devoto prison, Buenos Aires

Premiere
- Date premiered: 1985
- Place premiered: Bush Theatre

Kiss of the Spider Woman is a 1983 stage adaptation by Manuel Puig of his novel Kiss of the Spider Woman.

Novelist, screenwriter and playwright Manuel Puig wrote two plays while living in exile. The first was a dramatised version of his 1976 novel El beso de la mujer araña (Kiss of the Spider Woman), written in 1983 and first staged in London in 1985 at the Bush Theatre, in an English-language version by translator Allan Baker, starring Mark Rylance and Simon Callow.

Baker's version was revived in April 2007 at the Donmar Warehouse with Rupert Evans as Valentin and Will Keen as Molina. Set in a cell at the Villa Devoto prison in Buenos Aires in 1976, it shows the developing relationship of revolutionary Valentin Arregui Paz and his cellmate Luis Alberto Molina, a homosexual who has apparently been 'planted' to sniff out the secrets of Valentin's Marxist group.

The novel was also adapted by Leonard Schrader for a 1985 film version directed by Hector Babenco, and in 1993 as a Broadway stage musical by John Kander and Fred Ebb, which received a film adaptation of its own in 2025.
