= Kiss of the Spider Woman (novel) =

1976 novel by Manuel Puig

- First edition cover
- Author: Manuel Puig
- Original title: El beso de la mujer araña
- Translator: Thomas Colchie (novel), Alan Baker (play)
- Cover artist: Maxfield Parrish, Ecstacy - 1929
- Language: Spanish
- Genre: Novel
- Publisher: Seix Barral
- Publication date: 1976
- Publication place: Argentina
- Media type: Print (Hardback & Paperback)

Kiss of the Spider Woman (Spanish: El beso de la mujer araña) is a 1976 novel by Argentine writer Manuel Puig. It depicts the daily conversations between two cellmates in an Argentine prison, Molina and Valentín, and the intimate bond they form in the process. It is generally considered Puig's most successful work. The novel was translated into English by Thomas Colchie in 1979.

Puig adapted the novel into a stage play in 1983. The novel has also been adapted into an Academy Award-winning film in 1985, a Tony Award-winning Broadway musical in 1993, and a 2020 television special episode of Katy Keene. A film adaptation of the Broadway musical was released in 2025.

== Historical background ==
Puig started Kiss of the Spider Woman in 1974 starting with Molina, who was an experiment in imagining a romantic female. From there the rest of the notes sprouted into the novel. At first the only country that would publish the novel was Spain. Upon publication it was included on a list of novels that could not be consumed by the population of Buenos Aires, along with novels such as Aunt Julia and the Scriptwriter by Mario Vargas Llosa. Puig feared the publication of the novel would affect his family negatively. Despite this it was entered in the Frankfurt Book Fair. It remained banned until 1983 when the Raúl Alfonsín government took control. The English translation of the book was started even before its official publication in Spanish in 1976. Some of the translation proved problematic for Puig including Molina's speech which he could not get to portray the proper sentimental aspects of the voice. The English translation by Thomas Colchie appeared in 1979. The French translation also proved problematic as the publisher edited out some scenes for their explicit nature. In 1981, Kiss of the Spider Woman won the best Latin American novel of the year from Istituto Italo Latino Americano in Italy.

== Plot ==
Two prisoners, Luis Molina and Valentín Arregui, share a cell in a Buenos Aires prison. The story takes place between September 9 and October 8, 1975. Molina is in jail for "corruption of a minor" while Valentín is a political prisoner, part of a revolutionary group trying to overthrow the government. The two characters, seemingly opposites, form an intimate bond in their cell and this relationship changes them in profound ways. Molina recounts various films he has seen to Valentín in order to help them forget their situation.

Toward the middle of the novel, the reader finds out that Molina is working for the police as a spy planted in Valentín's cell to befriend him and try to extract information about his organization. Molina gets provisions from the outside for his cooperation with the officials, in the hopes of keeping up appearances that his mother comes to visit him (a cover for him to pass on his reports). It is through his general acts of kindness to Valentín that the two fall into a romance and become lovers. For his cooperation, Molina is paroled. On the day he leaves, Valentín asks Molina to take a message to his revolutionary group on the outside. Feeling guilty for having betrayed Valentín's trust, Molina agrees to deliver the message. Unbeknownst to Molina, he is secretly being followed after his release by military agents, who have correctly guessed Valentín would ask this of him.

When Molina attempts to meet with Valentín's group the military spies decide to arrest him. Once the spies identify themselves to Molina a car drives by and shoots at them, killing Molina. The military assumes Valentín's comrades killed Molina so that he wouldn't be able to confess. The novel ends in Valentín's stream-of-consciousness after he has been given an anesthetic following torture. He imagines himself sailing away with his beloved Marta.

=== The First Film ===
The first story Molina recounts, which opens the novel, is based on the movie Cat People (1942). During the narration, the reader finds out that Valentín sympathizes with the secretary because of his long-lost love, Marta.

The title of the novel relates to this film: after the prisoners have become lovers, Valentín remarks that, rather than the panther woman who can never kiss anyone, Molina is “the spider woman, that traps men in her web”.

=== The Second Film ===
The second story Molina recounts is based on a Nazi propaganda film. Unlike the first, it is unclear whether or not this is an actual movie, but may be a composite of multiple Nazi films and an American film called Paris Underground (1945).

In the film, a French woman falls in love with a noble Aryan officer and then dies in his arms after being shot by the French resistance. The film is a clear piece of Nazi propaganda, but Molina's disinclination to see past its superficial charms is a symptom of his alienation from society, or at least his choice to disengage from the world that has rejected him.

=== The Third Film ===
The third story Molina recounts, based on the film The Enchanted Cottage (1945), is the only film Molina does not describe to Valentín; instead he recites it to himself. It concerns an Air Force pilot, disfigured by war wounds, who secludes himself in a cottage. The cottage's homely maid eventually falls in love with and then marries the pilot. They discover that their love has transformed them — he appears handsome to her and she beautiful to him. Their transformation is only perceived by the two lovers and the audience.

=== The Fourth Film ===
The fourth film concerns a young revolutionary with a penchant for racing cars who meets a sultry older woman and whose father is later kidnapped by guerrillas. With his paramour's aid the boy attempts to rescue his father, who ends up dying in a shootout with police. Disillusioned, the young boy joins the guerrillas.

=== The Fifth Film ===
Based on the film I Walked with a Zombie (1943), the fifth story concerns a rich man who marries a woman and brings her to his island home. There his new bride discovers a witch doctor who has the ability to turn people into zombies. It is eventually revealed that the man's first wife was seduced by the witch doctor and turned into a zombie. Reunited with his first wife, the man proclaims his love for his first wife, but is ultimately killed by the witch doctor.

=== The Sixth Film ===
The sixth film Molina recounts is a love story in which a newspaper man falls in love with the wife of a Mafia boss. Lovestruck, he stops his newspaper from running a potentially damaging story about the woman. They run away together but are unable to support themselves. When the man falls ill, his lover prostitutes herself so they can survive. In the end, the man dies and the woman ends up walking away along a beach.

== Characters ==
- Molina – One of the protagonists and the prime storyteller. A homosexual man (using the novel's parlance) who has been jailed for "corrupting a minor."
- Valentín – The other protagonist and the main implied listener. He is a revolutionary imprisoned for belonging to a leftist organization that is trying to overthrow the government.
- The Warden – One of the antagonists in the novel; he sets up Molina to spy and retrieve information from Valentín, and receives regular reports from him.
- Gabriel – The waiter whom Molina befriends; he acts as Molina's main love interest throughout the novel.
- Marta – Marta is Valentín's love interest whom he lost in order to maintain a serious commitment to his revolutionary organization. She only appears in memories and streams-of-consciousness in the novel.
- The prison guard
- Molina's mother

== Style ==
The novel's form is unusual in that there is no traditional narrative voice. It is written in large part as dialogue, without any indication of who is speaking, except for a dash (‍―) to show a change of speaker. There are also significant portions of stream-of-consciousness writing. What is not written as dialogue or stream-of-consciousness is written as meta-fictional government documentation. The conversations between the characters, when not focused on the moment at hand, are recountings of films that Molina has seen, which act as a form of escape from their environment. Thus there are a main plot, several subplots, and five additional stories that comprise the novel.

== Themes ==
The author includes a long series of footnotes on the psychoanalytic theory of homosexuality. The footnotes act largely as a representation of Puig's political intention in writing the novel: to present an objective view of homosexuality. The footnotes include both factual information and that given by the fictional Anelli Taub. The footnotes tend to appear at moments of misunderstanding between Molina and Valentín. The extended notes deepen the novel's experimental nature while clarifying the book's challenge to traditional psychoanalytic views of homosexuality.

== Reception ==
The novel received mixed reviews. The Hudson Review stated that "Puig is a master of narrative craftsmanship" (1979), while The New York Times Book Review asserted that "Other than these film synopses, there's not much here". Rita Felski, in The Uses of Literature, has argued for an interpretation of Kiss of the Spider Woman as "an exercise in aesthetic re-education," a reading that is indicative of the principles she has laid out in her vision of postcritique.

== Adaptations ==
=== Play ===
Puig adapted the novel into a stage play in 1983, with an English translation by Allan Baker. It was first staged in London in 1985 using Baker's translation, with Mark Rylance and Simon Callow in the lead roles. It was staged again in April 2007 at the Donmar Warehouse, starring Rupert Evans as Valentin and Will Keen as Molina.

=== Musical ===
The musical was first staged in May 1990 in New York by the production company New Musicals, and was directed by Harold Prince with music by John Kander and lyrics by Fred Ebb. Initially received negatively by critics, New Musicals folded after its production. In June 1992, it was revived in Toronto by the producer Garth Drabinsky, featuring Brent Carver as Molina, Anthony Crivello as Valentin and Chita Rivera as the Spider Woman/Aurora. The musical had successful runs in Toronto (1992), the West End (1992-93), and Broadway (1993). It won the 1993 Tony Award for Best Musical, Best Book of a Musical, and Best Original Score, as well as acting awards for all three principals in the cast. In 2025, a film adaptation of the musical was released.

=== Film ===
The Argentine-born Brazilian director Héctor Babenco directed a film adaptation in 1985, based on a screenplay by Leonard Schrader. The film was set in a Brazilian prison and starred William Hurt as Molina, Raul Julia as Valentin, and Sônia Braga as the Spider Woman. It received critical acclaim, with Babenco being nominated for the Palme d'Or and Hurt winning the Academy Award and BAFTA for Best Actor. The film was nominated for further three Academy Awards, including Best Picture, Best Director, and Best Adapted Screenplay.

The 2025 film is based on the 1992 stage musical and is directed by Bill Condon, featuring Diego Luna as Valentin, Tonatiuh as Molina, and Jennifer Lopez as the Spider Woman/Aurora. The film received generally positive reviews but did poorly at the box office, grossing $2 million against a production budget of $30 million.
