= National Board of Review Awards 1985 =

Annual film awards

57th National Board of Review Awards

Best Picture:
The Color Purple

The 57th National Board of Review Awards were announced on December 16, 1985, and given on January 27, 1986.

== Top 10 films ==
1. The Color Purple
2. Out of Africa *Academy Award for Best Picture*
3. The Trip to Bountiful
4. Witness
5. Kiss of the Spider Woman
6. Prizzi's Honor
7. Back to the Future
8. The Shooting Party
9. Blood Simple
10. Dreamchild

== Top Foreign Films ==
1. Ran
2. The Official Story
3. When Father Was Away on Business
4. La Chèvre
5. The Home and the World

== Winners ==
- Best Picture:
  - The Color Purple
- Best Foreign Language Film:
  - Ran
- Best Actor:
  - Raúl Juliá and William Hurt - Kiss of the Spider Woman
- Best Actress:
  - Whoopi Goldberg - The Color Purple
- Best Supporting Actor:
  - Klaus Maria Brandauer - Out of Africa
- Best Supporting Actress:
  - Anjelica Huston - Prizzi's Honor
- Best Director:
  - Akira Kurosawa - Ran
- Career Achievement Award:
  - Orson Welles
