= Denise Dumont =

Brazilian television and film actress

- Born: 20 March 1955 (age 71); Fortaleza, Ceará; Brazil
- Occupation: Actress
- Years active: 1973–Present

Denise Dumont (born 20 March 1955 in Fortaleza, Ceará) is a Brazilian television and film actress. She made her name in a succession of telenovelas in the 1970s, playing minor roles. In 1980, she landed the leading role in Marina. She later performed in Hollywood films including Woody Allen's Radio Days (1987)

== Filmography ==
=== Film ===
Year	Title	Role
1981	Filhos e Amantes	Marta
1982	Rio Babilônia	Cláudia
1982	Os Vagabundos Trapalhões	Professor Juliana
1985	Kiss of the Spider Woman	Michele
1987	The Allnighter	Julie
1987	Radio Days	Latin singer 'Tico-Tico no Fubá'
1988	Heart of Midnight	Mariana
1988	The Long Haul	Fernanda
2014	Tim Maia	Mrs. Cardoso

=== Television ===
Year	Title	Role	Notes
1973–1974	O Semideus	Analu	
1980	Marina	Marina	138 episodes
1981	Baila Comigo	Xuxa	163 episodes
1986	The Equalizer	Maria Rivera	Episode: "Tip on a Sure Thing"
2010	The Cariocas	Taci / Mãe	1 episode
