= Lynn Favin =

American voice actress

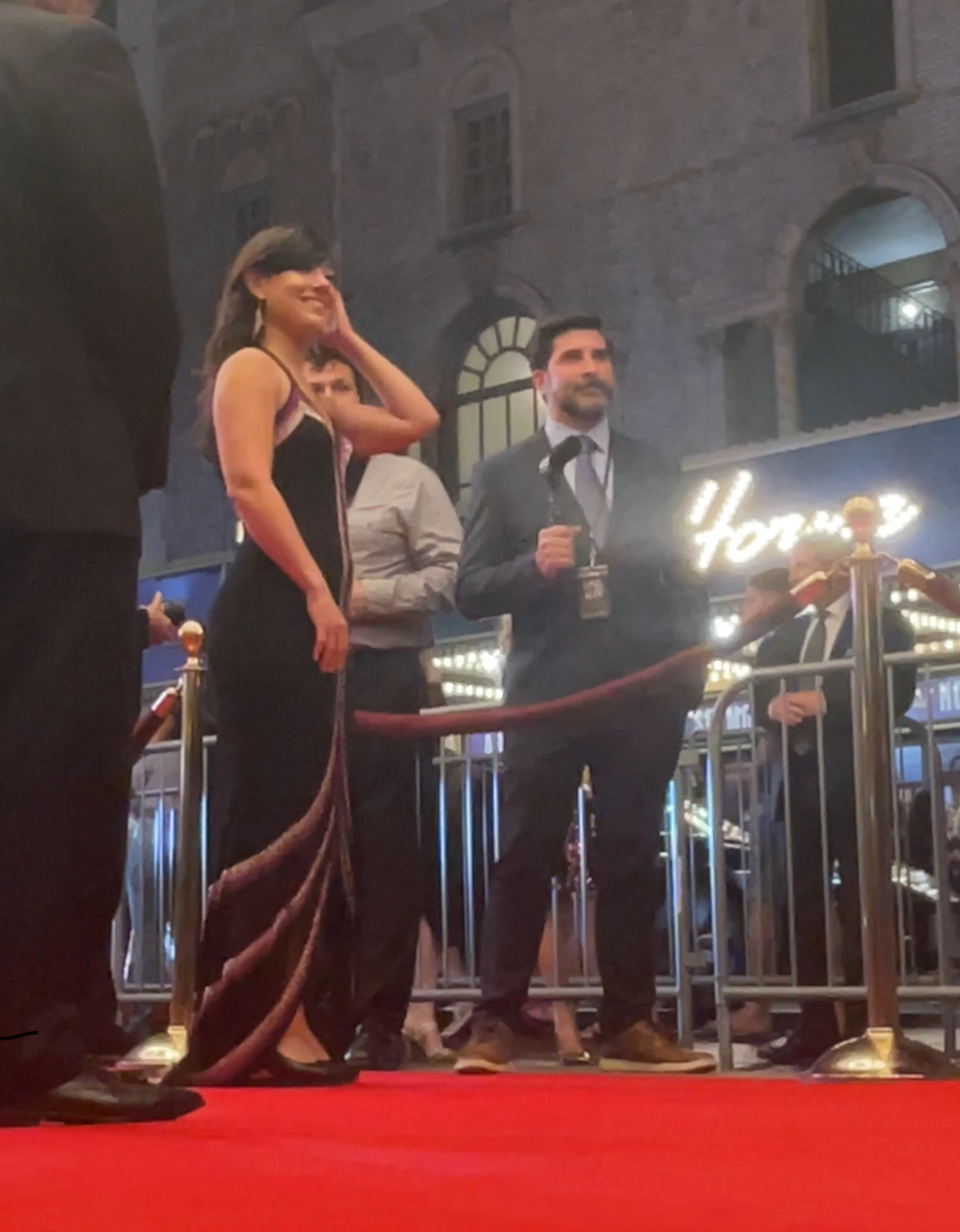
- Lynn Favin in NYC
- Education: Juilliard; Old Vic (MFA); Wesleyan University (BA)
- Occupation: Actress
- Years active: 2015–present

Lynn Favin is an American actress. She is known for her roles on Elsbeth, The Get Down, Veep, Famous in Love, The Show Must Go Online, and for voicing seventeen characters on the animated series Robot Chicken on Adult Swim. She performed on Saturday Night Live and is a regular actress with the American Film Institute in Los Angeles, and currently resides in New York City.

== Early life and education ==
Favin received a double Bachelor of Arts in Psychology and Theater from Wesleyan University, where she appeared in numerous plays and musicals. She holds a Master in Fine Arts in Acting from the Old Vic (UK), and trained at Juilliard.

== Television ==
Favin began appearing in television productions during the mid-2010s. She first gained recognition as a recurring performer on Baz Luhrmanns’ Netflix's musical drama The Get Down, before becoming a major recurring actress on Adult Swim's Emmy Award-winning series Robot Chicken, voicing seventeen characters across Seasons 8 through 11.

She had principal roles in HBO's political satire Veep, the MGM+ comedy-drama Get Shorty, Freeform's romantic drama Famous in Love, Comedy Central's The New Negroes, and TruTV's Rachel Dratch's Late Night Snack. She was also featured in Workaholics and Grandfathered.

Favin also portrayed multiple Shakespearean roles, including Lady Percy. Queen Margaret, and Cornelius in The Show Must Go Online, an international digital theatre project created during the COVID-19 pandemic that brought together professional actors from around the world to perform Shakespeare online.

In 2024, she appeared on the CBS legal comedy-drama Elsbeth, portraying Holly, opposite Carrie Preston. Her later television work has included the Lifetime film Terry McMillan Presents: Preach, Pray, Love, in which she portrayed Roberta Miles, as well as the series Gig Work, where she stars as Soo-Yeon. She also played Eva Longoria and Selena Gomez’s “doppleganger” in Season 4, Episode 5 of Only Murders in the Building.

Outside of acting, Favin performed as a featured cellist in the Saturday Night Live: Season 50 musical routine "Wonderful Tonight" alongside Lady Gaga and Bowen Yang.

Throughout her television career, Favin has worked across CBS, NBC, HBO, Netflix, Lifetime, Comedy Central, Adult Swim, Freeform, TruTV, Epix, and Paramount+, frequently alternating between dramatic, comedic, musical, and voice acting roles.

== Film ==
Favin is a recurring leading actress with the AFI in Los Angeles, with work on the independent film Papa Gorilla Banana, shot in Venice, California. She received top billing as The Cellist in Ving Rhames's movie Uppercut. The project was later released in multiple versions, including Uppercut: The Still Version and Uppercut: The Sparkling Version.

Favin appeared in the main cast of Kiss of the Spiderwoman with Jennifer Lopez in 2025. She had starring roles in Cali Queen, Deuterostomes, and a leading role in the upcoming fantasy feature Kobold.

Favin also has numerous supporting roles, including Reunion of Champions, Highly Motivated Individuals, Dry City, and the upcoming feature film Words From the Oven starring Jonathan Banks. She also has a supporting role opposite Jaime Pressly in the sports drama Last Shot, debuting in theaters October 2026.

== Theater ==
Favin played Rosalind in As You Like It, and Glauce in the world premiere of Medea: A Rock Cantata before booking her first National Tour, playing Ophelia in Hamlet, Lily in The Giver, the Narrator/Cellist in Grapes of Wrath in repertory. She was the Inaugural Equity Guest Artist for Shakespeare on the Bluff in Los Angeles, starring as Desdemona in Othello and Titania in A Midsummer Night's Dream, and appeared as a Witch in Macbeth with the Shakespeare Theater of Los Angeles. She has numerous regional Equity credits including Life x 3 at Coachella Valley Rep, and was in the opening company of the Sarah Play at Round House Theatre.

== Commercial work ==
Favin has appeared in numerous national and international advertising campaigns. Her principal commercial work includes campaigns for VitaminWater, directed by Spike Lee; Tiffany & Co., opposite Natalie Portman (debuting during the broadcast of the 2026 Academy Awards); and a Bliss skincare campaign, opposite Piper Perabo.

Favin has also appeared in commercials for Subway, Dramamine, American University, the FIFA’s Women's World Cup, Chevrolet, Dunkin' Donuts, Blue Moon, Campbell's, the New York Lottery, and Amazon Prime's Jean-Claude Van Johnson.

== Personal life ==
Favin currently lives in New York City and is represented by Buchwald.

== Filmography ==
=== Television ===
Year	Title	Role
2015-2021	Robot Chicken	Supergirl, Mei Ling, Tibby, Various voices
2016	The Get Down	Singer
2016	Rachel Dratch's Late Night Snack	Cher
2017	Veep	Assistant
2017	Famous in Love	Charlotte
2018	Get Shorty	Wendy
2019	The New Negroes	Crystal
2020	The Show Must Go Online	Lady Percy, Queen Margaret
2023	Austintatious	Susan
2024	Elsbeth	Holly
2025	Long Bright River	Music student #1
2025	Gig Work	Soo-Yeon
2025	Saturday Night Live	Performer - "Wonderful Tonight"
2025	Preach, Pray, Love	Roberta Miles
2026	American Classic	Celebrity

=== Film ===
Year	Title	Role
2010	Papa Gorilla Banana	Cecil Yamamoto
2017	E-Men Video	Saija
2018	Dry City	Andie
2019	Deuterostomes	Jane
2021	Haunted City: Radio Play	Phantom Faye
2021	Reunion of Champions	Annie Prescott
2023	Uppercut: the Still Version	The Cellist
2025	Uppercut: the Sparkling Version	The Cellist
2025	Kiss of the Spider Woman	Villager
2026	Highly Motivated Individuals	Scarlett
2026	Last Shot	Felicia
2026	Kobold	Stella
2027	Words From the Oven	Betty

== Stage ==
Year	Title	Role	Notes
2007	Dr. Faustus	Gluttony	International
2012	Medea: A Rock Cantata	Glauce	World Premiere
2015	As You Like It	Rosalind	Regional
2016	The Grapes of Wrath	Narrator	National Tour
2016	The Giver	Lily	National Tour
2016	Hamlet	Ophelia	National Tour
2017	Macbeth	Witch	Regional
2018	Othello	Desdemona	Regional
2018	A Midsummer Night's Dream	Titania	Regional
2019	RIchard III	Lady Anne	International
2020	Pericles	The Bawd	International
2022	Life x 3	Sonia	Regional
