= Tom Kirdahy =

American producer and activist (born 1963)

- Kirdahy in 2026
- Born: Thomas Joseph Kirdahy; June 18, 1963 (age 63); Hauppauge, New York, U.S.
- Education: New York University (BA, JD)
- Occupations: Theatre producer, lawyer
- Organization: Tom Kirdahy Productions
- Spouse: Terrence McNally (m. 2003; died 2020)
- Website: www.tomkirdahyproductions.com

Thomas Joseph Kirdahy (born June 18, 1963) is an American Tony and Olivier Award-winning theatrical producer, film producer, lawyer, and activist.

Kirdahy's projects include the 2025 Broadway revival of Terrence McNally, Lynn Ahrens, and Stephen Flaherty's Ragtime at Lincoln Center, which won four Tony Awards including Best Revival of a Musical, and the new musical Just In Time, originally starring Jonathan Groff as Bobby Darin. Kirdahy also produced the 2024 Broadway revival of Gypsy, starring six-time Tony Award winner Audra McDonald and directed by five-time Tony Award winner George C. Wolfe, and the film adaptation of the Terrence McNally, John Kander, and Fred Ebb musical Kiss of the Spider Woman, written and directed by Bill Condon and starring Jennifer Lopez.

His current productions include the Broadway musical Hadestown, winner of eight Tony Awards including Best Musical, and the off-Broadway revival of Little Shop of Horrors originally starring Jonathan Groff, Tammy Blanchard, and Christian Borle, which won the Drama Desk, Drama League and Outer Critics Circle Awards for Best Revival of a Musical.

Kirdahy produced the New York Times Critic’s Pick Here We Are, the final musical from Stephen Sondheim. He is also known for the Broadway production of the epic two-part play The Inheritance, winner of four Tony Awards including Best Play, and the Tony-nominated 2022 Broadway revival of August Wilson’s Pulitzer Prize-winning play The Piano Lesson, starring Samuel L. Jackson, John David Washington, and Danielle Brooks, which became the highest-grossing August Wilson play in Broadway history.

His other notable Broadway credits include the 2019 revival of Terrence McNally’s Frankie and Johnny in the Clair de Lune starring Audra McDonald and Michael Shannon, which received two Tony Award nominations including Best Revival of a Play, the musical Anastasia, the 2014 revival of It's Only a Play starring Nathan Lane and Matthew Broderick, and The Visit starring Chita Rivera, which received five Tony Award nominations. He has received additional Tony nominations for Broadway productions of Mothers and Sons, After Midnight, Ragtime, and Master Class. His West End credits include the West End production of The Inheritance, which won four Olivier Awards including Best New Play, and Edward Albee's The Goat, or Who Is Sylvia?. Off-Broadway, Kirdahy has produced The White Chip, The Jungle, and White Rabbit Red Rabbit, among other shows.

== Early life and education ==
Kirdahy was born in Hauppauge, New York, in 1963 and is the son of Paul E. Kirdahy and Joan Kirdahy (née McGunnigle). Two-time Tony Award-winner Donna Murphy grew up across the street from him. He attended New York University and graduated as valedictorian of his class in 1985 with a BA in politics and dramatic literature. He then went on to NYU School of Law in the hopes of being an entertainment lawyer.

== Legal career and activism ==
The advent of the AIDS crisis steered him towards dedicating his early professional career to fighting for LGBT causes and providing free legal services for people with HIV/AIDS. Kirdahy said, "At the time the AIDS crisis was getting worse. A great number of my friends were getting sick and dying. I felt that I needed to do something about the crisis that was decimating my community." He developed HIV projects at Gay Men's Health Crisis, Bronx AIDS services, and Nassau-Suffolk Law Services. For many years, he was highly active at the Manhattan Lesbian, Gay, Bisexual, and Transgender Community Center, from its early days when ACT UP was forming to when he became a part of the Executive Board where he played a critical role in expanding its cultural programs. He was the co-Chair of the East End Gay Organization which would eventually lead him to meet his future husband, playwright, Terrence McNally, as well as LGBT figures like Edith Windsor, the plaintiff in the landmark Supreme Court case that led to the legalization of same-sex marriage.

== Theatre career (2007–present) ==
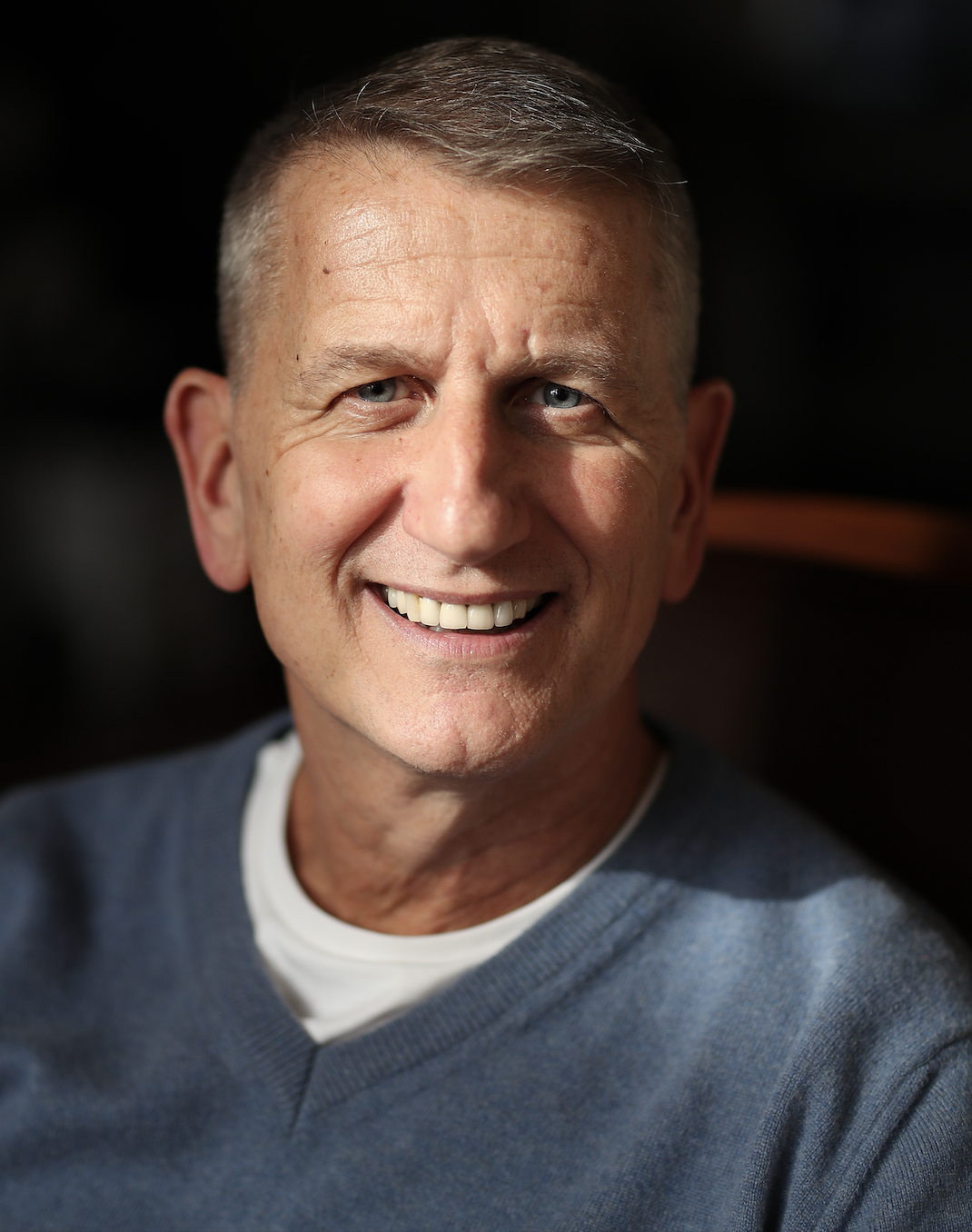
Kirdahy in 2020

Kirdahy always maintained a passion for the theatre, even while pursuing a career as an activist and lawyer. Through the East End Gay Organization, Kirdahy and critic, Isa Goldberg, organized a discussion called "Theatre From a Gay Perspective", which was the beginning of his transition to a producing career. The panel included three playwrights: Lanford Wilson, Edward Albee, and Terrence McNally.

Kirdahy serves on The Broadway League Board of Governors, the Board of Trustees of Broadway Cares/Equity Fights AIDS, and the Advisory Council for the Harry Ransom Center at the University of Texas at Austin, and is a founding director of Berwin Lee London New York Playwrights, Inc. He was named the Broadway Global Producer of the Year in 2014, and received the Commercial Theater Institute's Robert Whitehead Award for Outstanding Achievement in Commercial Theater Producing in 2019. In 2020, Tom was the recipient of the Miss Lilly Award, a prize in recognition of his advocacy for women in a male-dominated industry.

=== Broadway ===
In 2007 he produced Deuce by Terrence McNally on Broadway starring Marian Seldes and Angela Lansbury. It was Lansbury's return to Broadway after more than twenty years. Kirdahy went on to produce the Tony-nominated revival of Ragtime (2009) and the revival of Master Class in the West End starring Tyne Daly (2011).

In 2014, he produced Terrence McNally's play Mothers and Sons starring Tyne Daly, which was McNally's 20th Broadway production. The New York Times described the Tony nominated play as "an ambitious attempt to dramatize the head-spinning changes in Gay America", and "a resonant elegy for a ravaged generation". It marked the first time a legally wed gay couple was seen on a Broadway stage.

In 2014, Kirdahy would go on to produce It's Only a Play, a satire of an opening night on Broadway. The cast included Nathan Lane, Matthew Broderick, Megan Mullally, Rupert Grint, Stockard Channing, F. Murray Abraham, and Micah Stock. It was directed by three-time Tony Award winner Jack O'Brien. The production broke box office records at the Gerald Schoenfeld Theatre where it was initially scheduled for an 18-week run. It's Only a Play transferred to the Bernard B. Jacobs Theatre and was extended to June 7, 2015. The production would subsequently star actors Martin Short, Katie Finneran, Maulik Pancholy, and T. R. Knight.

Kirdahy followed up It's Only a Play with a production of The Visit, a musical with a book by Terrence McNally, music by John Kander, and lyrics by Fred Ebb. The musical was fifteen years in the making, but the production seen on Broadway was the result of a new team assembled by Kirdahy, which included Chita Rivera, Roger Rees, and directed by John Doyle, who Kirdahy stopped on an airplane in order to get the script read by him. The musical went on to earn five Tony nominations.

In 2016, Kirdahy produced the musical, Anastasia, on Broadway, after it set box office records in a run at Hartford Stage. The creative team included Terrence McNally (Book), Stephen Flaherty (Music), and Lynn Ahrens (Lyrics), and was directed by Tony Award-winner Darko Tresnjak. The musical ran at the Broadhurst Theatre on Broadway from March 23, 2017, to March 31, 2019. The U.S. national tour launched in the fall of 2018, and the show continues to tour worldwide.

In 2019, Kirdahy opened Hadestown on Broadway at the Walter Kerr Theatre, which the New York Times described as "Sumptuous. Hypnotic. Gorgeous," and the Wall Street Journal called "the best new musical of the season." The musical was nominated for 14 Tony Awards on June 9, 2019, the most nominations received for any production, and won eight, including Best Musical. The production is directed by Rachel Chavkin with music, lyrics, and book by Anaïs Mitchell. In the same year, Kirdahy produced a Tony-nominated revival of Frankie and Johnny in the Clair de Lune by Terrence McNally starring six-time Tony winning actress Audra McDonald and two-time Oscar nominated actor Michael Shannon. This new production, directed by Arin Arbus, opened on May 30, 2019, at the Broadhurst Theatre, and was a celebration of McNally's 80th birthday. McDonald called McNally "one of our great American playwrights." The production was additionally notable as the first production in Broadway history to use an intimacy director.

In 2021, the Broadway production of The Inheritance won four Tony Awards, including Best Play.

Kirdahy produced the first Broadway revival of August Wilson’s Pulitzer Prize-winning play The Piano Lesson in 2022. The production starred Samuel L. Jackson, John David Washington, and Danielle Brooks, and was directed by LaTanya Richardson-Jackson. This revival made history as the first Broadway production of an August Wilson play to be directed by a woman and garnered critical acclaim, with Helen Shaw of The New Yorker calling it “in a word, magnificent.”

On April 26, 2023, Kirdahy’s world premiere production of the new Kander and Ebb musical New York, New York opened at the St. James Theatre, with direction and choreography by Susan Stroman. Just over a month later, on May 30, 2023, the new American play Grey House opened at the Lyceum Theatre. Grey House marked the Broadway debut of playwright Levi Holloway, and starred Laurie Metcalf, Tatiana Maslany, and Paul Sparks, alongside Sophia Anne Caruso and Millicent Simmonds. The production was notable for incorporating American Sign Language. Simmonds, who played a Deaf character named Bernie, said in a 2023 interview that “it’s interesting to see how Bernie navigates her life with the other people in this world. It’s not just about English and ASL as the two languages; you have so many languages operating in the house.”

Kirdahy produced the world premiere of Stephen Sondheim's final musical, Here We Are, with a book by David Ives and direction by Joe Mantello. Described by the New York Times as “hands down, the most anticipated event of the fall season,” the production opened at The Shed in Hudson Yards on October 22, 2023, and was immediately heralded as “cool and impossibly chic” by Jesse Green in his New York Times review.

=== Off-Broadway ===
Kirdahy produced the off-Broadway show White Rabbit Red Rabbit by Nassim Soleimanpour in 2016, which ran for 42 weeks at the Westside Theatre – "a notable achievement on an economically challenging Off-Broadway landscape", according to Variety. Each performance featured a different actor, who was handed the script in front of an audience. The actor did not have access to the text until that moment and then performed it live with a script in hand. A portion of the play's profits were donated to PEN International, an association of writers working to promote literature and defend freedom of expression around the world. The idea of a new weekly guest star attracted a rotating cast of performers including Whoopi Goldberg, Nathan Lane, Martin Short, Darren Criss, Alan Cumming, Bobby Cannavale, Billy Porter, Cynthia Nixon, Tony Danza, Brian Stokes Mitchell, and many more.

The Jungle had its off-Broadway premiere at St. Ann’s Warehouse in December 2018, where it was critically lauded. The New York Times described the show as “thrilling” and “extraordinary.” The show’s New York transfer received significant attention in the press when three actors from the original London cast – residents of predominantly Muslim countries – were barred from traveling to the United States by President Trump’s travel ban. Kirdahy and the other lead producers were determined to move the show with the original cast intact, and they worked to overcome the travel ban. All three performers were ultimately granted employment visas by the State Department.

Kirdahy's 2019 off-Broadway revival of Little Shop of Horrors^{.} won every Best Musical award it was eligible for, including the Drama Desk for Outstanding Revival of a Musical, the Drama League Award for Outstanding Revival of a Musical, and the Outer Critics Circle Award for Outstanding Revival of a Musical, a distinction it shares with the original 1983 production. The 2019 production featured Jonathan Groff as Seymour, Tammy Blanchard as Audrey, and Christian Borle as Orin, with direction by Michael Mayer.

In 2025, Kirdahy produced the world premiere of Caroline off-Broadway at MCC Theater, directed by David Cromer and starring Chloë Grace Moretz.

=== London's West End ===
In the West End, Kirdahy produced The Inheritance at the Noël Coward Theatre which opened in 2018 and ran until January 19, 2019. The two-part play by Matthew López had a sold-out run at the Young Vic and Dominic Cavendish of The Telegraph called it "the most important American play of the century". The play was directed by Stephen Daldry and featured John Benjamin Hickey and Vanessa Redgrave. The production won four Olivier Awards for Best New Play, Best Direction, Best Actor, and Best Lighting Design. Kirdahy also produced The Jungle by Joe Murphy and Joe Robertson and directed by Stephen Daldry and Justin Martin. The play tells the stories of a group of refugees at a real migrant camp in Calais, France. After a sold-out run at the Young Vic, the production began previews on June 16, 2018, at the Playhouse Theatre in the West End and ran until November 3, 2018. His other productions in the West End include the 2012 revival of Terrence McNally's Master Class, starring Tyne Daly as Maria Callas, and Edward Albee's The Goat, or Who Is Sylvia? starring Damian Lewis and Sophie Okonedo and directed by Ian Rickson in 2017.

== Personal life ==
Kirdahy was married to American playwright Terrence McNally following a civil ceremony in Vermont on December 20, 2003, until McNally's death from COVID-19 on March 24, 2020. They married in Washington, D.C., on April 6, 2010. In celebration of the Supreme Court's decision to legalize same-sex marriage in all 50 states, they renewed their vows at New York City Hall with Mayor Bill de Blasio officiating on June 26, 2015.

== Theatre credits as a producer ==
- Deuce, Music Box Theatre, Broadway (2007)
- Ragtime, Neil Simon Theatre, Broadway, (2009)
- Master Class, Samuel J. Friedman Theatre, Broadway (2011)
- Master Class, Vaudeville Theatre, West End (2012)
- After Midnight, Brooks Atkinson Theatre, Broadway (2013)
- Mothers and Sons, John Golden Theatre, Broadway (2014)
- It's Only a Play, Gerald Schoenfeld Theatre, Bernard B. Jacobs Theatre, Broadway (2014)
- The Visit, Lyceum Theatre, Broadway (2015)
- White Rabbit Red Rabbit, Westside Theatre, Off-Broadway (2016)
- The Goat, or Who Is Sylvia?, Royal Haymarket, West End (2017)
- Anastasia, Broadhurst Theatre, Broadway (2017)
- Bandstand, Bernard B. Jacobs Theatre, Broadway (2017)
- The Jungle, Playhouse Theatre, West End (2018)
- Head Over Heels, Hudson Theatre, Broadway (2018)
- The Inheritance, Noël Coward Theatre, West End (2018)
- Hadestown, Walter Kerr Theatre, Broadway (2019)
- Frankie and Johnny in the Clair de Lune, Broadhurst Theatre, Broadway (2019)
- Little Shop of Horrors, Westside Theatre, Off-Broadway (2019)
- The Inheritance, Ethel Barrymore Theatre, Broadway (2019)
- The Piano Lesson, Ethel Barrymore Theatre, Broadway (2022)
- New York, New York, St. James Theatre, Broadway (2023)
- Grey House, Lyceum Theatre, Broadway (2023)
- Here We Are, The Shed, off-Broadway (2023)
- Gypsy, Majestic Theatre, Broadway (2024)
- Just In Time, Circle In the Square, Broadway (2025)
- Ragtime, Vivian Beaumont Theater at Lincoln Center, Broadway 2025
