= Carry-On =

2024 thriller film by Jaume Collet-Serra

- Release poster
- Directed by: Jaume Collet-Serra
- Written by: T. J. Fixman
- Produced by: Dylan Clark
- Starring: Taron Egerton; Sofia Carson; Danielle Deadwyler; Theo Rossi; Logan Marshall-Green; Jason Bateman
- Cinematography: Lyle Vincent
- Edited by: Fred Raskin; Elliot Greenberg; Krisztian Majdik
- Music by: Lorne Balfe
- Production companies: Dylan Clark Productions; DreamWorks Pictures
- Distributed by: Netflix
- Release date: December 13, 2024
- Running time: 119 minutes
- Country: United States
- Language: English
- Budget: $47 million

Carry-On is a 2024 American action thriller film directed by Jaume Collet-Serra and written by T. J. Fixman. The film stars Taron Egerton, Sofia Carson, Danielle Deadwyler, and Jason Bateman. Its plot follows a young TSA officer who is blackmailed into allowing a nerve agent on board a flight during Christmas Eve in order to kill 250 people.

Carry-On was released by Netflix on December 13, 2024, received positive reviews from critics, and earned more views during its opening week than any other film released on Netflix in 2024.

== Plot ==
Ethan Kopek, a TSA officer at LAX, has become cynical after being rejected from the police academy for concealing his father's criminal history. On Christmas Eve, his pregnant girlfriend Nora encourages him to reapply to pursue his dream. Instead, Ethan asks his supervisor Phil Sarkowski to assign him to manage a baggage-scanning lane, hoping to demonstrate his merit for a promotion.

During his shift, Ethan receives an earbud, through which he is contacted by the ruthless mercenary the Traveler. He orders him to let a specific carry-on case pass through the scanner, or Nora will be killed.

The Traveler's accomplice, the Watcher, remotely monitors Ethan, thwarting his attempts to alert the authorities, despite various calls to 911 that he makes on his watch and phone. He finally manages to write a secret warning to airport police officer Lionel, using invisible ink. However, before Lionel can act, the Traveler poisons him with anaphylaxis, causing a fatal heart attack.

Due to Ethan's seemingly erratic behaviour, his friend Jason takes over his position. The Traveler warns Ethan that he will kill Jason if necessary to execute his plan, so Ethan plants an alcoholic drink at his workstation, which (when discovered by the supervisor) results in Jason's removal.

After replacing Jason, Ethan lets a man pass through with the carry-on case as instructed, and sees from his boarding pass that his name is Mateo Flores. The Traveler reveals that the suitcase contains Novichok, a lethal nerve agent.

Meanwhile, LAPD detective Elena Cole investigates a double homicide (shown at the beginning) and discovers the victims had smuggled Novichok into the country. She alerts the DHS and connects the threat to Ethan's aborted 911 call.

In response, a terminal-wide sweep is ordered, and Ethan, evading the Watcher's surveillance, secretly adds Mateo to the list of passengers flagged for inspection. However, the Traveler suspects Ethan's interference and confronts him in a restroom; in the resulting scuffle, Ethan seizes the Traveler's plastic gun, but the Traveler arms the Novichok bomb remotely via phone.

Sarkowski detains Mateo for inspection, but Ethan interrupts, holding them both at gunpoint. Mateo fatally stabs Sarkowski after Ethan refuses to shoot him, before revealing that he, too, is being coerced; the Watcher is holding Mateo's husband Jesse hostage.

With time running out, the Traveler guides Ethan to reset the bomb. Afterward, Mateo is ordered to kill Ethan, but is killed himself when the plastic gun overheats and explodes. The Traveler retrieves the Novichok case and orders the Watcher to kill Nora. Ethan uses Mateo's phone to warn her. Nora evades the Watcher in the parking garage, but is cornered. Jesse breaks free and kills the Watcher.

En route to the airport with DHS agent John Alcott, Cole soon realizes the agent is an impostor—one of the Traveler's accomplices—so Cole kills him in self-defense. Upon arriving at the airport, Cole confronts Ethan and alerts the LAPD, initiating a terminal shutdown.

Cole uncovers that the Traveler's target is Congresswoman Grace Suarez Turner, a passenger on a flight to Washington, D.C., who advocates for increased weapons funding. The Novichok attack is designed to implicate Russia, ensuring congressional approval of substantial defense spending and enriching weapons manufacturers.

The Traveler boards the flight, unaware that Ethan has switched the bomb into an identical but larger suitcase, forcing him to stow it in the cargo hold instead of the overhead baggage compartment. Ethan infiltrates the hold to disarm it, while Nora persuades Cole to allow the flight to take off, preventing the Traveler from becoming suspicious.

As Ethan begins dismantling the bomb, the Traveler receives a phone alert so he confronts Ethan at gunpoint. Before he can re-arm the Novichok and escape via parachute, Ethan fights the Traveler and knocks him inside an airtight unit with the nerve agent. In an attempt to escape, the Traveler kicks the nerve agent capsule, causing it to activate next to him and unintentionally killing himself.

One year later, Ethan is a full-fledged police officer for the LAPD. He takes Nora and their infant son on a trip to Tahiti, with Jason and his family joining them.

== Cast ==
- Taron Egerton as Ethan Kopek
- Jason Bateman as The Traveler
- Sofia Carson as Nora Parisi
- Danielle Deadwyler as Elena Cole
- Tonatiuh Elizarraraz as Mateo Flores
- Theo Rossi as The Watcher
- Logan Marshall-Green as Agent John Alcott
- Josh Brener as Herschel
- Dean Norris as Phil Sarkowski
- Sinqua Walls as Jason Noble
- Curtiss Cook as Lionel Williams
- Benito Martinez as Security Director Marm Bellows

== Production ==
In June 2021, Amblin Partners signed a deal with Netflix to produce multiple films per year for the streaming service. Carry-On was originally planned to be the first film to come from the deal, the initial draft of the screenplay was written by former Insomniac Games writer T. J. Fixman, with Michael Green writing another draft. Only Fixman was eventually credited with the screenplay while Green received an off-screen "Additional Literary Material" credit. Fixman intended the film to be an illustration of the trolley problem.

In July 2022, it was announced that Taron Egerton was tapped to star in the lead role of Ethan Kopek. In August 2022, Jason Bateman joined the film co-starring alongside Egerton as the mysterious traveler. Sofia Carson and Danielle Deadwyler joined the cast in September 2022. Theo Rossi joined the cast in October 2022. Tonatiuh Elizarraraz, Dean Norris, Logan Marshall-Green, and Sinqua Walls were among the eight new cast additions to join the film later that month.

On an estimated budget of $47 million, principal photography took place in New Orleans, Louisiana, from September 2022 to January 2023. While the film is primarily set at Los Angeles International Airport, the only scene to be filmed in LAX were the exteriors of the theme building and the control tower; all terminal and concourse sequences as well as restricted area scenes were filmed at the decommissioned terminal of Louis Armstrong New Orleans International Airport.

Fixman received extensive expert advice about airport security but deliberately used artistic license with TSA procedures for the sake of the storyline.

== Release ==
Carry-On was produced by DreamWorks Pictures, but was released under the Amblin Entertainment banner. Carry-On was released on Netflix on December 13, 2024.

Ten days after its release, the film had 97 million views, and was anticipated to become one of the top ten most-watched films on Netflix.

In January 2025, Carry-On became the fifth-most-watched Netflix English-language film of all time, having received more than 149.5 million views.

== Reception ==
=== Critical response ===
On the review aggregator website Rotten Tomatoes, 87% of 107 critics' reviews are positive, with an average rating of 6.8/10. The website's consensus reads: "Taron Egerton and an against-type Jason Bateman make for great adversaries in Carry-On, a throwback thriller that clears all checkpoints of plot logic with its confident execution." Metacritic, which uses a weighted average, assigned the film a score of 69 out of 100, based on 25 critics, indicating "generally favorable" reviews.

Lovia Gyarkye of The Hollywood Reporter calls the movie "a satisfying surveillance thriller" in which "Egerton and Bateman's performances elevate Carry-On and contribute significantly to the film's overall success", and even "[t]he actors who make up this gallery of side characters offer brief but wonderful turns, adding humorous touches to a high-stakes story." Forbes calls it "a Die Hard-style Christmas thriller you definitely need to watch," thanks to "keeping the tension high and the pacing tight. It never outwears its welcome, moving along at a nice clip, with most of its best moments just a conversation between Ethan and Traveler."

Collider rates the movie at 7 out of 10 stars, writing, "At its core, Carry-On is a wildly entertaining, mid-budget B-movie featuring two talented stars in Bateman and Egerton, playing a mistletoe-coated game of cat-and-mouse. It's pretty easy to let your sense of realism go given just how much fun you'll have while watching." Their reviewer admires the acting: "Casting Bateman as a villain is an inspired choice... While in a lot of ways, Traveler is a fairly two-dimensional villain, Bateman elevates the role in a way that makes him far more memorable." Meanwhile, "Egerton once again proves that he makes for an immensely likable leading man." Similarly, Punch Drunk Critics awards the movie 3.5 out of 5 stars, praising it as "a smartly-crafted, heartstopping thriller," and agrees with the casting of Egerton as opposed to a Bruce Willis or Liam Neeson type: "He's still got that everyman quality but he's young, athletic, and earnest. You can easily believe he's a good guy who has lost his way a little bit. ... Egerton gives Ethan loads of personality, and Bateman's smugness comes through both as a threatening voice over the phone and when Traveler's forced to get his hands dirty."

Sarah Little, writing for Screen Rant, said, "Netflix's Carry-On has been shockingly divisive in the days following its premiere, as most critics seemingly enjoyed the movie, while audiences have (ironically) been more critical of it."

The TSA noted that the film contains inaccuracies, but praised the filmmakers for portraying a TSA officer in a heroic light.

=== Accolades ===
Award	Date of ceremony	Category	Recipient(s)	Result	Ref.
Producers Guild of America Awards	February 8, 2025	Outstanding Producer of Streamed or Televised Motion Pictures	Carry-On	Nominated	
Golden Trailer Awards	May 29, 2025	Best Motion/Title Graphics	"The Bag" (Netflix / X/AV)	Nominated	
Golden Trailer Awards	May 29, 2025	Best Graphics in a TV Spot (for a Feature Film)	"Showdown" (Netflix / X/AV)	Nominated	
Golden Trailer Awards	May 29, 2025	Best Sound Editing in a TV Spot (for a Feature Film)	"Showdown" (Netflix / X/AV)	Nominated	
Golden Trailer Awards	May 29, 2025	Best Thriller TV Spot (for a Feature Film)	"Showdown" (Netflix / X/AV)	Nominated	
Critics' Choice Super Awards	August 7, 2025	Best Actor in an Action Movie	Taron Egerton	Nominated	
