= Kiss of the Spider Woman (musical) =

1992 musical by John Kander and Fred Ebb

- Broadway Playbill
- Music: John Kander
- Lyrics: Fred Ebb
- Book: Terrence McNally
- Basis: Kiss of the Spider Woman by Manuel Puig
- Productions: 1992 Toronto; 1992 West End; 1993 Broadway
- Awards: Tony Award for Best Musical; Tony Award for Best Book of a Musical; Tony Award for Best Original Score

Kiss of the Spider Woman is a musical with music by John Kander, lyrics by Fred Ebb, and a book by Terrence McNally. It is based on the 1976 novel by Manuel Puig. Directed by Harold Prince, the musical had runs in Toronto (1992), the West End (1992-93), and Broadway (1993). It won the 1993 Tony Award for Best Musical, Best Book of a Musical, and Best Original Score, as well as acting awards for all three principals in the cast.

A film adaptation starring and co-executive produced by Jennifer Lopez and written and directed by Bill Condon premiered at the 2025 Sundance Film Festival on January 26, 2025.

== Plot ==
Luis Alberto Molina, a gay window dresser, is in a prison in Argentina, serving his third year of an eight year sentence for corrupting a minor. He lives in a fantasy world to flee the prison life, the torture, fear and humiliation. His fantasies turn mostly around movies, particularly around a vampy diva, Aurora. He loves her in all roles, but one role scares him: the spider woman, who kills with her kiss.

One day, a new man is brought into his cell: Valentin Arregui Paz, a Marxist revolutionary, already in a bad state of health after torture. Molina cares for him and tells him of Aurora. But Valentin can't stand Molina and his theatrical fantasies and draws a line on the floor to stop Molina from coming nearer to him. Molina, however, continues talking, mostly to block out the cries of the tortured prisoners, about Aurora and his mother. Valentin at last tells Molina that he (Valentin) is in love with a girl named Marta.

Again, Valentin is tortured. Again, Molina has to care for him afterwards. In his fantasies, Aurora is next to him, helping him do so.

The prison director announces to Molina that his mother is very ill and that Molina will be allowed to see her on one condition: he must tell them the name of Valentin's girlfriend.

Molina tells Valentin about a man he loves, a waiter named Gabriel, who does not return his feelings, and the two men cautiously begin to bond. Only a short while afterwards, Molina gets hallucinations and cramps after knowingly eating poisoned food intended for Valentin. He is brought to the hospital ward, talking to his mother and to the Spider Woman. As Molina is brought back, Valentin starts suffering from the same symptoms, also from poisoned food. Molina is afraid that Valentin will be given substances that might make him talk and so protects Valentin from being taken to the hospital. As Molina nurses him, Valentin asks him to tell him about his movies. Molina is happy to do so; Valentin also shares his fantasies and hopes with Molina.

Molina is allowed a short telephone conversation with his mother, and he announces to Valentin that he's going to be freed for his good behaviour the next day. Valentin begs him to make a few telephone calls for him. Molina at first refuses, but Valentin persuades him with sex. Molina is brought back the next day, heavily injured. He has been caught in the telephone call, but refuses to tell whom he has phoned. The warden draws his pistol, threatening to shoot him, if he doesn't tell. Molina confesses his love to Valentin and is shot. The scene then shifts to Molina in a heaven-like world, where all of the people in his life are watching his final "movie." The Spider Woman arrives and gives her deadly kiss as the curtain falls.

== Songs ==
Act I

- Prologue – Spider Woman and Prisoners
- "Her Name is Aurora" – Molina, Aurora, Aurora's Men and Prisoners
- "Over the Wall" – Prisoners
- "And the Moon Grows Dimmer" – Aurora
- "Bluebloods" – Molina
- "Dressing Them Up" / "I Draw the Line" – Molina and Valentin
- "Dear One" – Molina's Mother, Marta, Valentin and Molina
- "Over the Wall II" – Prisoners, Molina and Valentin
- "Where You Are" – Aurora, Aurora's Man and Prisoners
- "Over the Wall III" / "Marta" – Valentin and Prisoners
- "Come" – Spider Woman
- "I Do Miracles" – Aurora and Marta
- "Gabriel's Letter" / "My First Woman" – Gabriel and Valentin
- "Morphine Tango" – Orderlies
- "You Could Never Shame Me" – Molina's Mother
- "A Visit" – Spider Woman and Molina
- "She's a Woman" – Molina
- "Gimme Love" – Aurora, Molina and Aurora's Men

Act II

- "Russian Movie" / "Good Times" – Aurora, Molina and Valentin
- "The Day After That" – Valentin and Families of the Disappeared
- "Mama, It's Me" – Molina
- "Anything for Him" – Spider Woman, Molina and Valentin
- "Kiss of the Spider Woman" – Spider Woman
- "Over the Wall IV" / "Lucky Molina" – Warden and Prisoners
- "Only in the Movies" / "His Name was Molina" – Molina and the People in His Life

=== Original casts ===
| Character | Original Toronto & West End Production | Original Broadway Production | Original US National Tour | UK National Tour |
| Character | 1992 | 1993 | 1996 | 2026 |
|---|---|---|---|---|
| Aurora | Chita Rivera | Chita Rivera | Chita Rivera | Anna-Jane Casey |
| Molina | Brent Carver | Brent Carver | Juan Chioran | Fabian Soto Pacheco |
| Valentin | Anthony Crivello | Anthony Crivello | John Dossett | George Blagden |

==== Notable West End replacements (1992–93) ====
- Aurora: Bebe Neuwirth

==== Notable Broadway replacements (1993–95) ====
- Aurora: María Conchita Alonso, Carol Lawrence, Janine LaManna, Vanessa Williams
- Molina: Juan Chioran, Jeff Hyslop, Howard McGillin
- Valentin: Brian Stokes Mitchell

== Productions ==
Kiss of the Spider Woman was first staged by New Musicals, whose goal was to create, develop, and provide a working home for sixteen new musicals over four years, at the Performing Arts Center, State University of New York at Purchase in May 1990. It was directed by Harold Prince with choreography by Susan Stroman and featured John Rubinstein, Kevin Gray, Lauren Mitchell, and Harry Goz. An attempt to persuade New York critics not to review this initial production (a "work in progress") failed, with Frank Rich in The New York Times arguing that it is "presented to the audience as a full-dress commercial production rather than a workshop", followed by other critics covering the production and also filing mostly negative reviews. New Musicals folded after Spider Woman.

Two years later, the producer Garth Drabinsky became involved, and in June 1992 his company, Livent, produced the show in Toronto at the Bluma Appel Theatre of the St. Lawrence Centre for the Arts. Harold Prince directed a cast that starred Brent Carver as Molina, Anthony Crivello as Valentin and Chita Rivera as Spider Woman/Aurora. (Of the original Purchase staging, Frank Rich had written that the title role needed "a dazzling musical-comedy presence of the Chita Rivera sort who has always ignited the flashiest Kander and Ebb songs.") Vincent Paterson choreographed the production assisted by Kim Blank. Keith McDaniel served as the production's dance captain and lead dancer who was featured as a dance partner to Chita Rivera in the original staging.

Kiss of the Spider Woman then transferred to the West End opening on October 20, 1992 at the Shaftesbury Theatre, where it ran for 390 performances. Directed by Harold Prince with choreography by Vincent Paterson and co-choreography by Rob Marshall, it again starred Brent Carver, Anthony Crivello and Chita Rivera. The production won the Evening Standard Award for Best Musical.

It opened on Broadway at the Broadhurst Theatre on May 3, 1993 and closed on July 1, 1995 after 904 performances. It was again directed by Harold Prince, with choreography by Vincent Paterson and Rob Marshall, scenic design and projection design by Jerome Sirlin, costume design by Florence Klotz, and lighting design by Howell Binkley. The cast included Carver, Crivello and Rivera repeating their roles, as well as Merle Louise and Kirsti Carnahan. Carver, Crivello and Rivera won Tony Awards for their performances. Notable replacements included: Brian Stokes Mitchell (Valentin), Howard McGillin and Jeff Hyslop (Molina); and, as Aurora, María Conchita Alonso, Vanessa L. Williams (in her Broadway debut) and Carol Lawrence.

The US regional theater premier took place at Masquerade Theatre in Houston, TX in May 1999. Directed and choreographed by Jim Williams, the show featured scenic and lighting design by Amy Ross and music direction by Brandon Matthews. The cast included Gina Nepoli-Holmes as Aurora, L. Jay Meyer as Molina, Pablo Bracho as Valentine, Monica Rial as Molina's Mother, Jacqui Williams as Marta, Tim Wroble as Gabriel, and Todd Porter as The Warden.

A 1996 touring version featured Chita Rivera again along with Juan Chioran as Molina and Dorian Harewood as Valentin.

It opened in Buenos Aires, Argentina at the Lola Membrives Theatre on May 2, 1995.

It opened in São Paulo, Brasil, in 2000, with Cláudia Raia and Miguel Falabella in the main roles.

Vortex Theatre Company revived it off Broadway in New York City in 2007.

A reduced production with a cast of 7 opened at The Darlinghust Theatre in Sydney, Australia on 13 July 2010. Directed and choreographed by Stephen Colyer and music directed by Craig Renshaw, the cast included Alexis Fishman (Aurora/Marta), James Lee (Molina), Frank Hansen (Valentin), Jennifer White (Molina's Mother), Wayne McDaniel (The Warden), Jim Williams (Estabon/Gabriel), and Matt Young (Marcos/Aurelio).

The first major UK production in 34 years opened in April 2026 at the Leicester Curve as part of a mini UK tour. It starred Fabian Soto Pacheco as Molina (taking over from the originally announced Layton Williams who withdrew from the production; George Blagden as Valentin and Anna-Jane Casey as Aurora/The Spider Woman. This was a small scale production with a cast of only 11, directed by Paul Foster. The choreographer was Joanna Goodwin and costume design by the award winning Gabriella Slade. The production was nominated for Best Musical Production at the 2026 UK Theatre Awards.

The New York City Center announced a revival production as part of its 2027 Encores! concert season, which will run from April 28th to May 9th.

== Film adaptation ==
In December 2023, Jennifer Lopez was announced to star as Aurora in a film adaptation of the musical with Bill Condon as writer and director. The independently-financed production was executive produced by Lopez, Elaine Goldsmith-Thomas and Benny Medina through their Nuyorican Productions banner, while Barry Josephson, Tom Kirdahy and Greg Yolen and Matt Geller served as producers. Sergio Trujillo, Brandon Bieber and Christopher Scott choreographed the musical sequences. Upon the announcement, a casting call opened for an unknown to play the role of Molina. Filming began in March 2024 in New Jersey. In March 2024, Tony Dovolani joined the cast as mob boss Johnny Desiderio. In April 2024, Diego Luna and Tonatiuh joined the cast as Valentin and Molina respectively, with Ben Affleck and Matt Damon joining the producing team under their Artists Equity banner. Lopez completed filming of her scenes in May 2024. Filming officially wrapped on June 16, 2024.

The film differs significantly from the stage version in that it cuts almost every song set in reality at the prison where Molina and Valentin are held (including "Dressing Them Up," "Over the Wall" and "The Day After That") and only keeps the ones set in the "fantasies" Molina comes up with (except for "And the Moon Grows Dimmer," "Come" and "Anything for Him"), creating a stark contrast between the grittiness of prison life in Argentina and the Technicolor lavishness and beauty of a classic MGM musical film, a storytelling technique similarly used in Bob Fosse's 1972 film adaptation of Cabaret. Numerous changes are made to the book including the renaming of Aurora (she becomes a character in one continuous movie instead of an actress in many movies) and a rewritten ending where Molina dies on the street rather than back in prison. In addition, three new songs were written by Kander with existing additional lyrical material by Ebb, each entitled "I Will Dance Alone", "Never You" and "An Everyday Man" (which was actually used in the original, vastly different 1990 premiere production in Purchase, NY).

It premiered at the 2025 Sundance Film Festival on January 26, 2025 to generally positive reviews from critics, and was released theatrically by Lionsgate, Roadside Attractions and LD Entertainment on October 10, 2025.

== Reception ==
In his review of the Broadway production for The New York Times, Frank Rich wrote that the musical "does not meet all the high goals it borrows from Manuel Puig's novel. When it falls short, it pushes into pretentious overdrive (a "Morphine Tango", if you please) and turns the serious business of police-state torture into show-biz kitsch every bit as vacuous as the B-movie cliches parodied in its celluloid fantasies. Yet the production does succeed not only in giving Ms. Rivera a glittering spotlight but also in using the elaborate machinery of a big Broadway musical to tell the story of an uncloseted, unhomogenized, unexceptional gay man who arrives at his own heroic definition of masculinity."

== Awards and nominations ==
=== Original London production ===
| Year | Award | Category | Nominee | Result |
|---|---|---|---|---|
| 1993 | Laurence Olivier Award | Best New Musical | | Nominated |
| 1993 | Laurence Olivier Award | Best Actor in a Musical | Brent Carver | Nominated |
| 1993 | Laurence Olivier Award | Best Director of a Musical | Harold Prince | Nominated |
| 1993 | Laurence Olivier Award | Best Set Design | Jerome Sirlin | Nominated |
| 1993 | Laurence Olivier Award | Best Lighting Design | Howell Binkley | Won |

=== Original Broadway production ===
| Year | Award Ceremony | Category | Nominee | Result |
|---|---|---|---|---|
| 1993 | Tony Award | Best Musical | | Won |
| 1993 | Tony Award | Best Book of a Musical | Terrence McNally | Won |
| 1993 | Tony Award | Best Original Score | John Kander and Fred Ebb | Won |
| 1993 | Tony Award | Best Actor in a Musical | Brent Carver | Won |
| 1993 | Tony Award | Best Actress in a Musical | Chita Rivera | Won |
| 1993 | Tony Award | Best Featured Actor in a Musical | Anthony Crivello | Won |
| 1993 | Tony Award | Best Direction of a Musical | Harold Prince | Nominated |
| 1993 | Tony Award | Best Choreography | Vincent Paterson and Rob Marshall | Nominated |
| 1993 | Tony Award | Best Scenic Design | Jerome Sirlin | Nominated |
| 1993 | Tony Award | Best Costume Design | Florence Klotz | Won |
| 1993 | Tony Award | Best Lighting Design | Howell Binkley | Nominated |
| 1993 | Drama Desk Award | Outstanding Musical | | Won |
| 1993 | Drama Desk Award | Outstanding Actor in a Musical | Brent Carver | Won |
| 1993 | Drama Desk Award | Outstanding Actress in a Musical | Chita Rivera | Won |
| 1993 | Drama Desk Award | Outstanding Music | John Kander | Nominated |
| 1993 | Drama Desk Award | Outstanding Set Design | Jerome Sirlin | Nominated |
| 1993 | Drama Desk Award | Outstanding Costume Design | Florence Klotz | Won |
| 1993 | New York Drama Critics' Circle Awards | Best Musical | John Kander, Fred Ebb and Terrence McNally | Won |

== Popular culture references ==
In 2020, an amateur production of the musical is the focus of "Chapter Seven: Kiss of the Spider Woman" episode of Katy Keene. The Katy Keene cast album of the musical was produced via WaterTower Music.
