= Kiss of the Spider Woman (2025 film) =

Film by Bill Condon

- Theatrical release poster
- Directed by: Bill Condon
- Screenplay by: Bill Condon
- Based on: Kiss of the Spider Woman by; Terrence McNally; John Kander; Fred Ebb; Kiss of the Spider Woman by Manuel Puig
- Produced by: Barry Josephson; Tom Kirdahy; Greg Yolen
- Starring: Diego Luna; Tonatiuh; Jennifer Lopez
- Cinematography: Tobias A. Schliessler
- Edited by: Brian A. Kates
- Music by: Sam Davis (score); Kander and Ebb (songs)
- Production companies: Artists Equity; Mohari Media; Josephson Entertainment; Tom Kirdahy Productions; Nuyorican Productions
- Distributed by: Roadside Attractions; Lionsgate Films; LD Entertainment
- Release dates: January 26, 2025 (Sundance); October 10, 2025 (United States); April 17, 2026 (United Kingdom)
- Running time: 128 minutes
- Country: United States
- Languages: English; Spanish
- Budget: $30 million
- Box office: $1.8 million

Kiss of the Spider Woman (Spanish: El beso de la mujer araña) is a 2025 American dystopian musical drama film written and directed by Bill Condon, based on the 1992 stage musical, itself based on Manuel Puig's 1976 novel (which had been previously adapted in 1985). It stars Diego Luna, Tonatiuh, and Jennifer Lopez.

The film had its world premiere at the 2025 Sundance Film Festival on January 26, where it received generally positive reviews from critics. It was released theatrically in the United States on October 10, by Lionsgate Films, Roadside Attractions and LD Entertainment. It was a box-office bomb, grossing $1.8 million against a production budget of $30 million.

== Plot ==
Note: The film alternates between scenes set in real life and the events of The Kiss of the Spider Woman, a film within the film, but this plot summary retells both storylines separately.

In Argentina in May 1983 at the tail end of the Dirty War, Luis Molina, a trans woman convicted of public indecency for same-sex acts, is moved to the same cell as Valentín Arregui, a political dissident involved with a revolutionary group. Though initially irritated by Molina's flamboyance and chatterbox personality, Valentín lets Molina tell him the plot of her favorite film, the Hollywood musical The Kiss of the Spider Woman, starring her idol Ingrid Luna.

=== The Kiss of the Spider Woman ===
The in-universe film, depicted as the character of Molina imagines it, is set in an imaginary South American country and follows Aurora (portrayed by Ingrid Luna), a successful magazine publisher and popular bachelorette whose best friend and assistant is Kendall (pictured by Molina as herself), and who falls instantly in love with a photographer named Armando (pictured as Valentín). The three travel to Aurora and Armando's home village, where they encounter the dangerous gangster Johnny Desiderio, who comes to want Armando dead. As Aurora left the village when she was too young to remember, Armando introduces her to it and its inhabitants.

Aurora learns that the village is protected from malevolent spirits by a powerful being named the Spider Woman (also portrayed by Ingrid Luna) in exchange for the regular sacrifice of a native woman's lover. Realizing that the Spider Woman will pick him as sacrifice, Aurora attempts to drive Armando away by pretending that she cares for neither him nor the villagers, but his unwavering devotion eventually breaks her facade. They reaffirm their mutual love, and Aurora decides that now that she was aware of the villagers' troubles, she wishes to help them as Armando does.

Kendall, jealous of Armando, betrays them to Johnny, and the couple escapes into the jungle, where Armando plans to sacrifice himself to the Spider Woman so that she continues protecting the village. However, Kendall, who followed the couple and whom Aurora loves as a true friend, sacrifices himself to the Spider Woman instead. Aurora realizes that although fearsome, the Spider Woman is not evil, as death can be necessary for life to exist, and the couple is able to live happily ever after.

=== Argentina ===
Unbeknown to Valentín, Molina was tasked with spying on him by the warden in exchange for potential parole. Despite being eager to be released from prison as her mother is ailing, Molina is hesitant to report on Valentín, rarely giving away any information and continuously caring for the latter as he is tortured and poisoned by prison officers. In return, Valentín warms up to Molina, and although originally dismissive, grows increasingly interested by her retelling The Kiss of the Spider Woman.

As anti-government protests grow in size, the warden surprises Molina by approving her parole. The prospect of being separated from each other leads Valentín and Molina to realize that they have fallen in love, and they become lovers the night before Molina is freed from prison. On the day of her release, Molina offers to contact Valentín's group in order to pass on information from Valentín to them, and Valentín agrees. As Armando had to Aurora in her re-telling, Molina gives Valentín a red scarf, and says she hopes Valentín will not forget her. Valentín reassures her he won't, and the two bid each other an emotional farewell.

After her release, Molina reunites with her family. Unaware that the warden has arranged to have her followed in the hope that she will lead them to Valentín's group, she makes contact with Valentín's comrades and passes on the information entrusted to her. Officers chase them, and the revolutionaries try to escape with Molina, but when she falls behind, they are forced to shoot her dead to prevent the officers from obtaining the information she holds. As she lays dying, Molina imagines herself dancing with Valentín/Armando. Before being welcomed into death by the Spider Woman at the end of her dying dream, Molina declares that she does not regret her sacrifice, although, like Kendall died for Aurora, she did it not for Valentín's cause but out of love for him. Later, Valentín is devastated by the news of Molina's death.

In October 1983, the military junta is toppled and thousands of political prisoners are freed. As his fellow inmates make it outside the jail and emotionally reunite with their families and friends, the newly-freed Valentín kisses Molina’s red scarf and raises it up in the air, saying “We made it, my love. We made it.”

== Cast ==
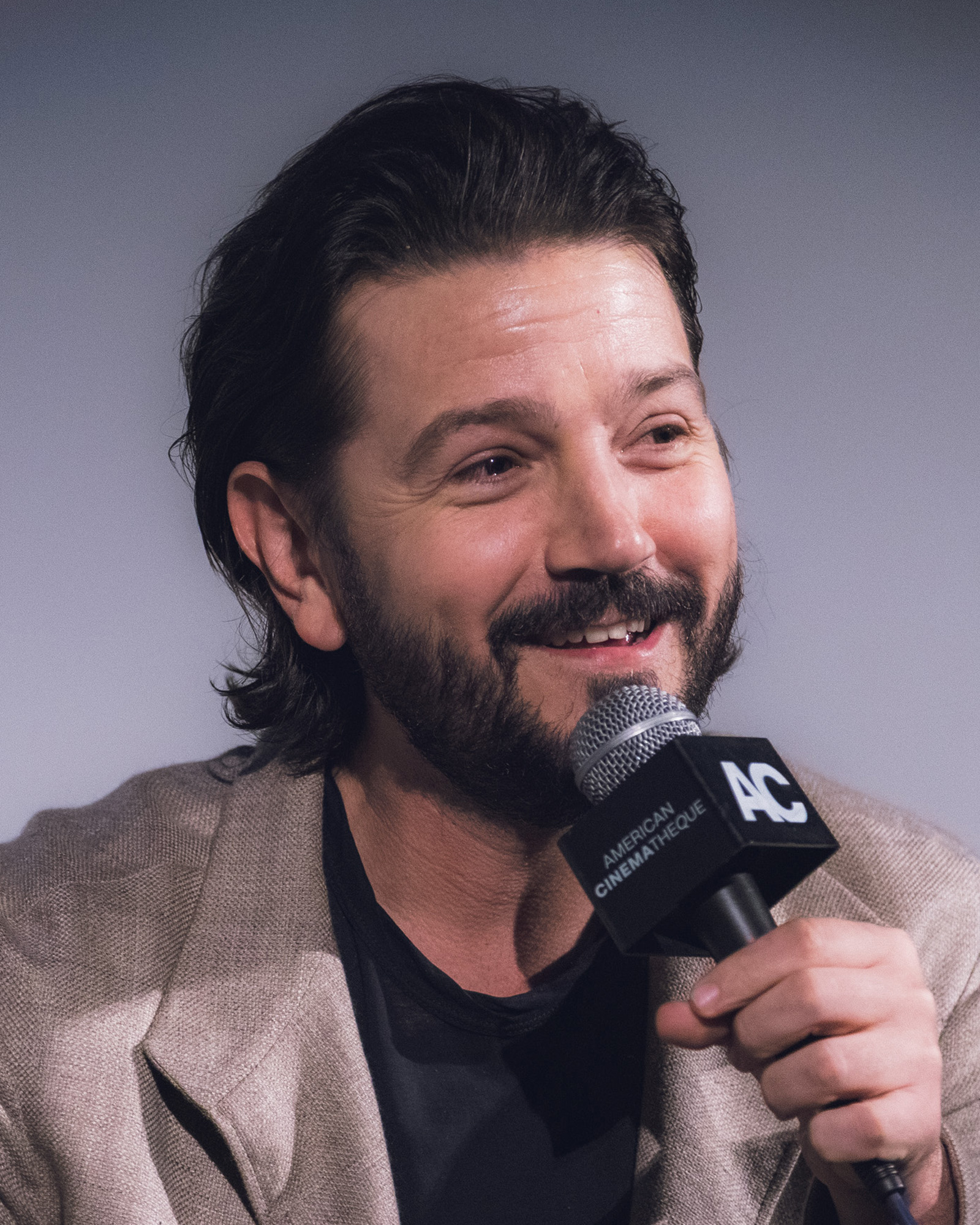
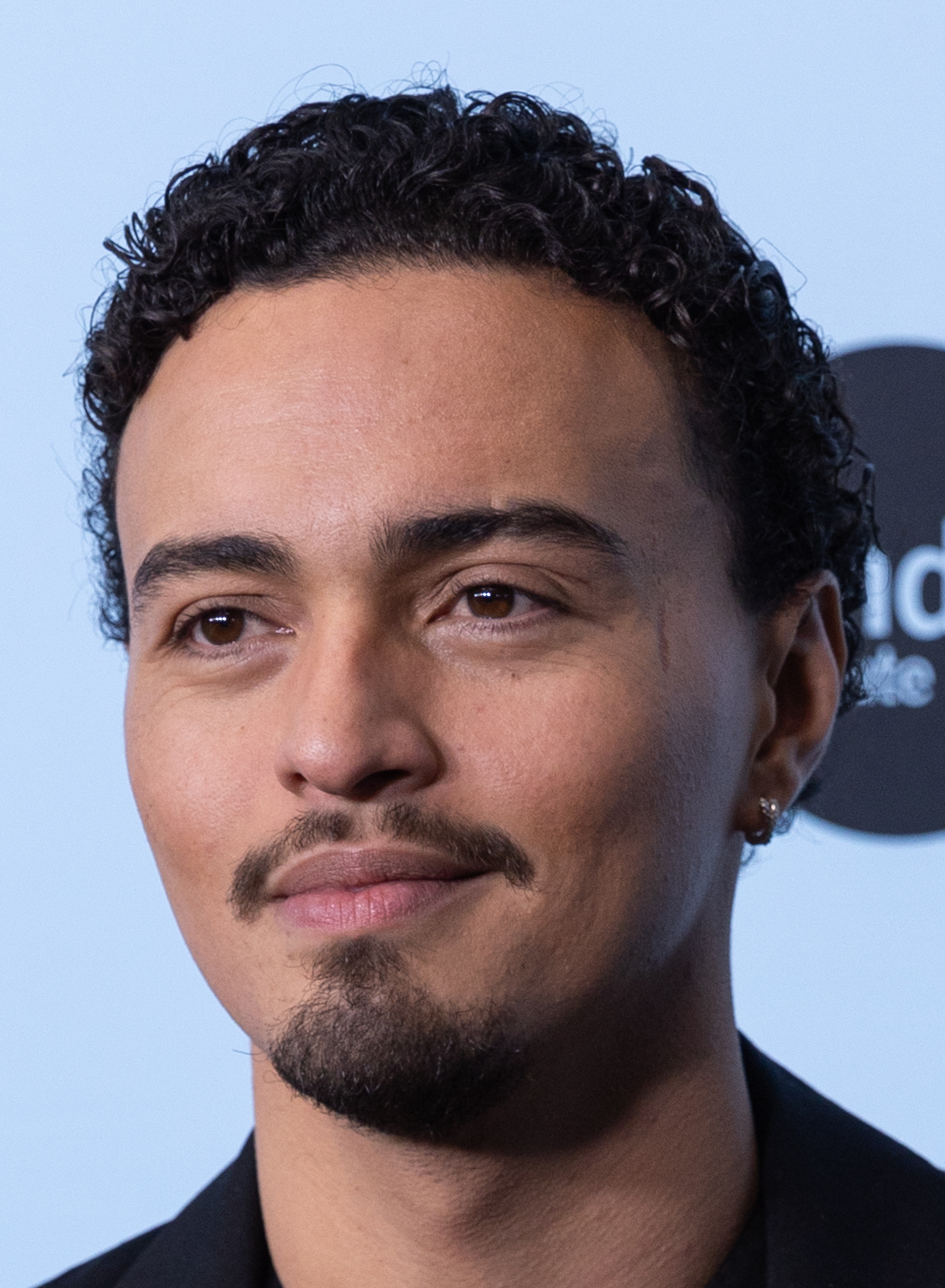
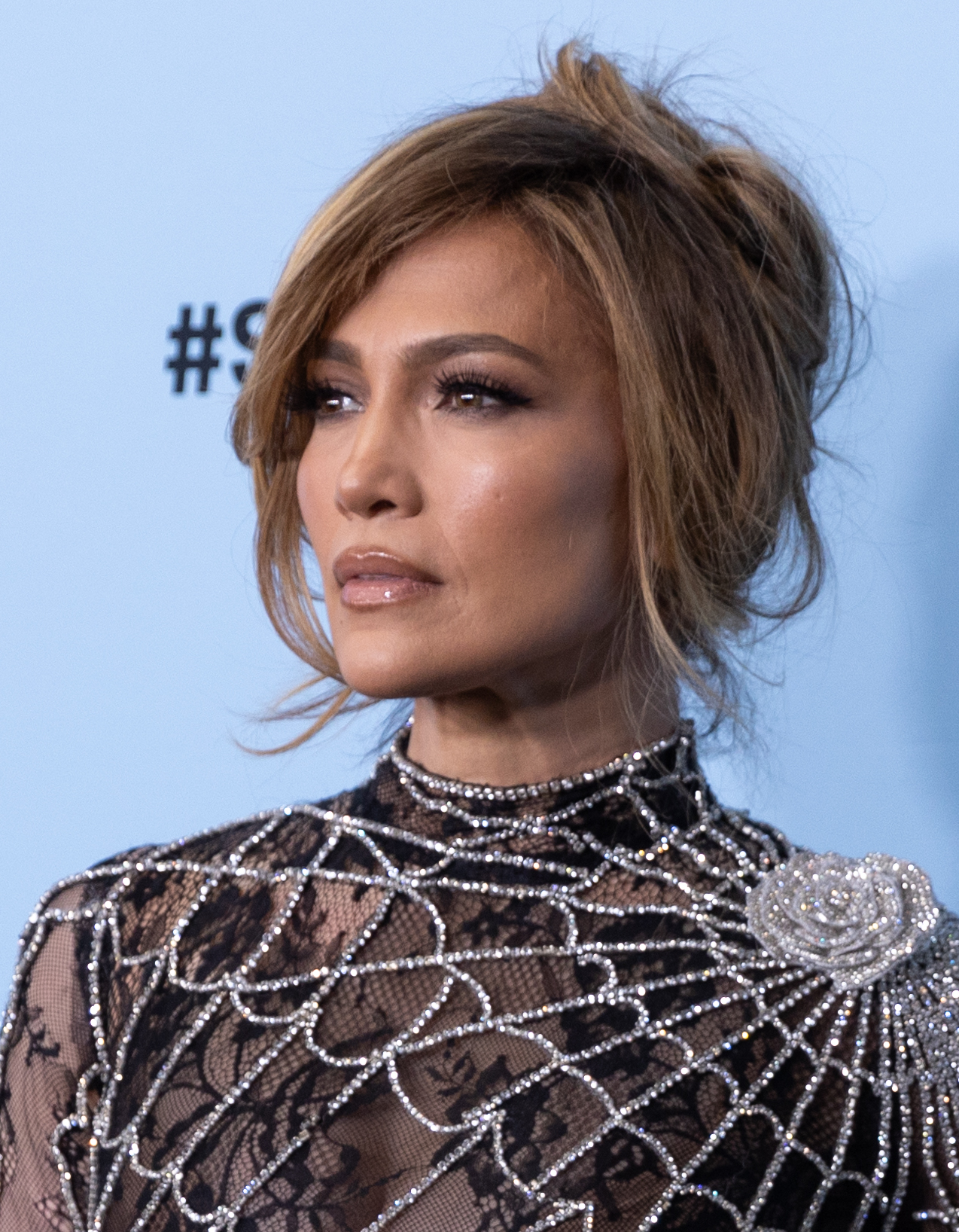
The film stars Diego Luna, Tonatiuh and Jennifer Lopez.
- Diego Luna as Valentín Arregui Paz, a political prisoner and dissident
  - Luna also portrays Armando, Aurora's love interest, in the on-screen depictions of Molina's re-telling of The Kiss of the Spider Woman
  - Eduardo Ramos briefly portrays Armando before Luna's version takes over
- Tonatiuh as Luis Molina, a window dresser convicted of public indecency for same-sex acts and who identifies as a woman. She is Valentín's new cellmate, and recounts to him her favorite film.
  - Tonatiuh also portrays Kendall Nesbitt, Aurora's male gay assistant and best friend, in The Kiss of the Spider Woman
  - David Turner briefly portrays Kendall Nesbitt before Tonatiuh's version takes over
- Jennifer Lopez as Ingrid Luna, an actress and Molina's idol whose posters she adds to her cell
  - Lopez also portrays both Aurora, the protagonist of The Kiss of the Spider Woman, and its titular antagonist, The Spider Woman
- Bruno Bichir as The Warden
- Josefina Scaglione as Marta
- Aline Mayagoitia as Paulina
- Tony Dovolani as Johnny Desiderio
- Thomas Canestraro as Desiderio's Henchman
- Kevin Michael Brennan as Shady Mocambo Man
- Lynn Favin as Villager
- Odain Watson as Villager

== Production ==
=== Development and casting ===
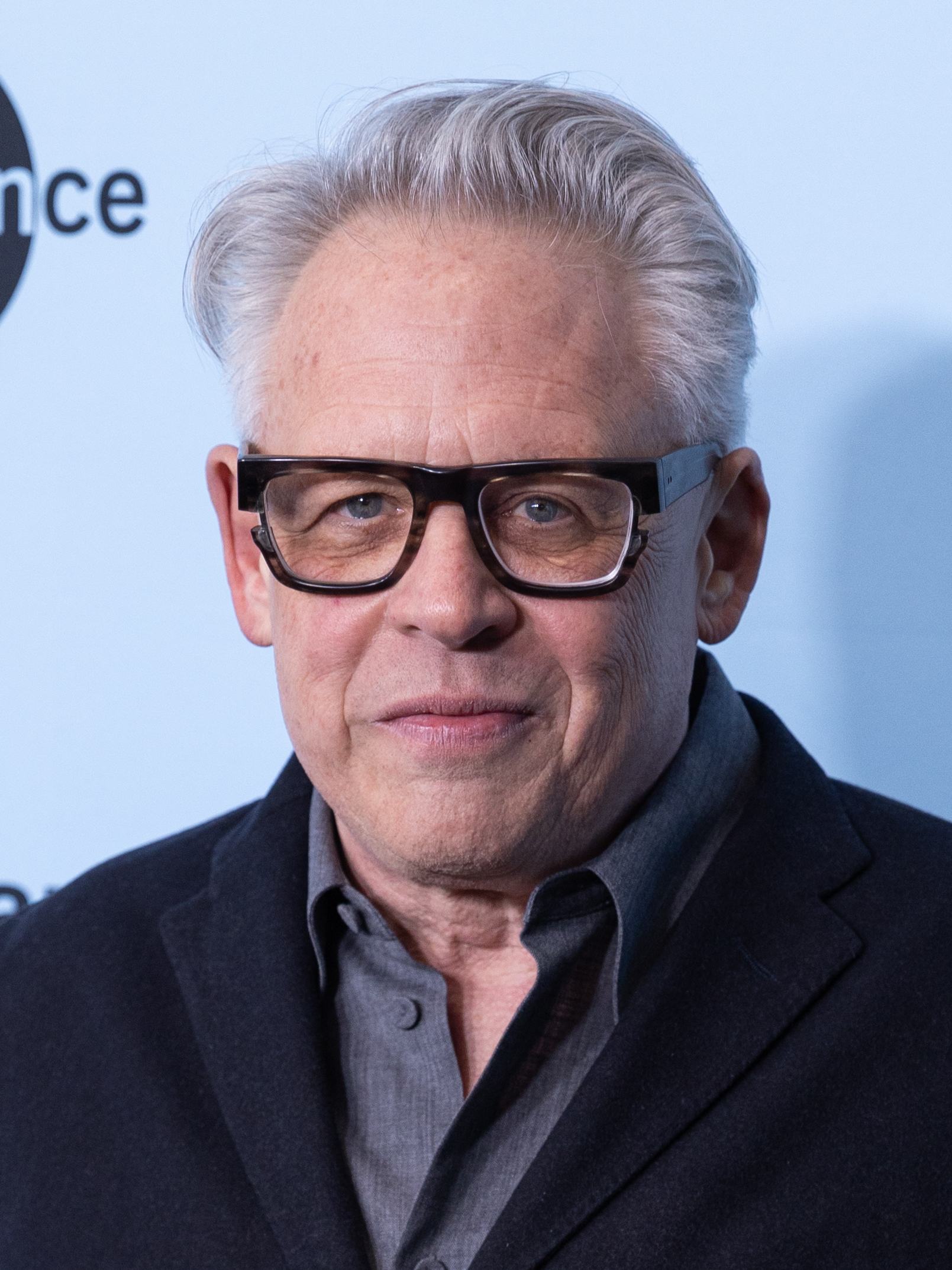
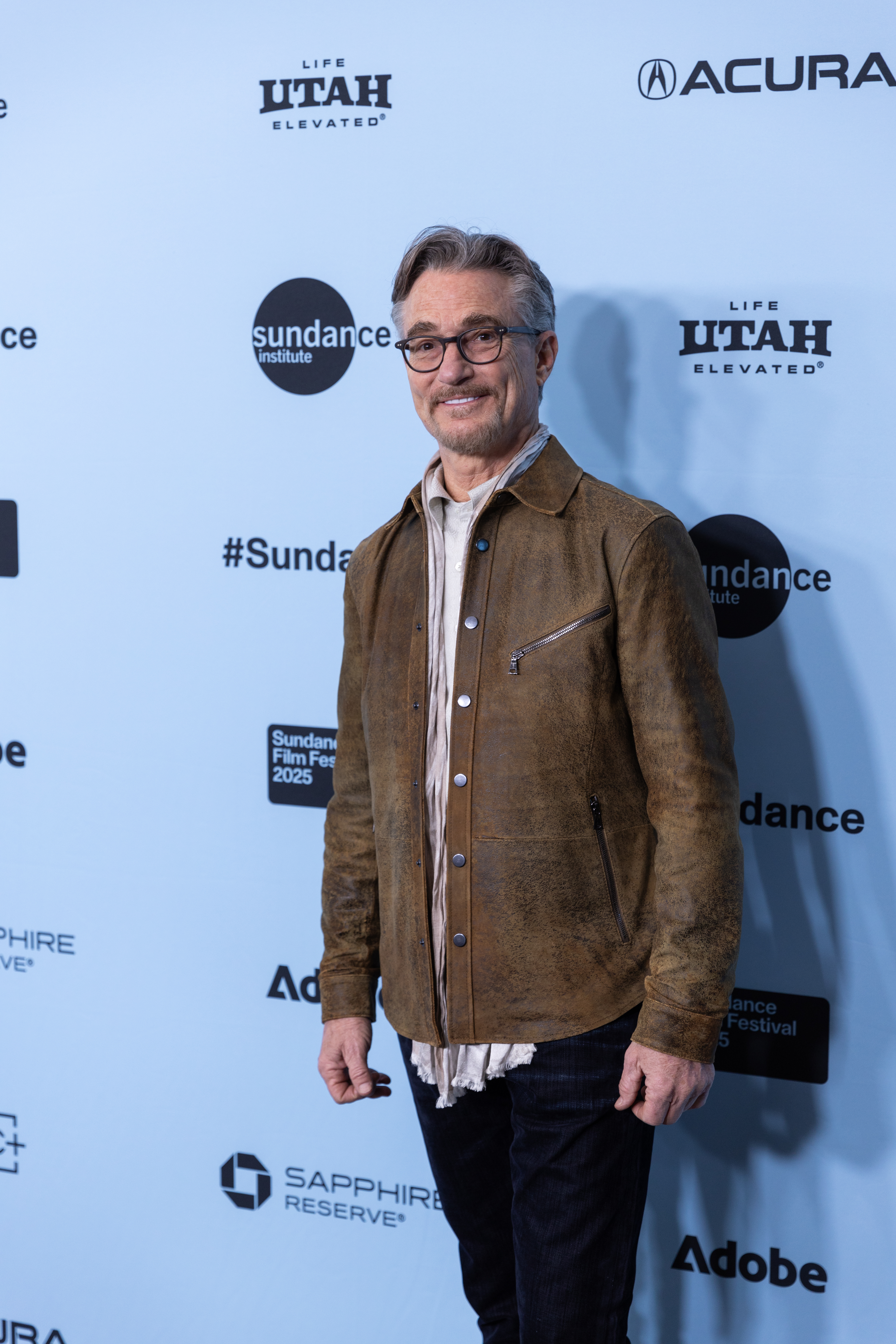
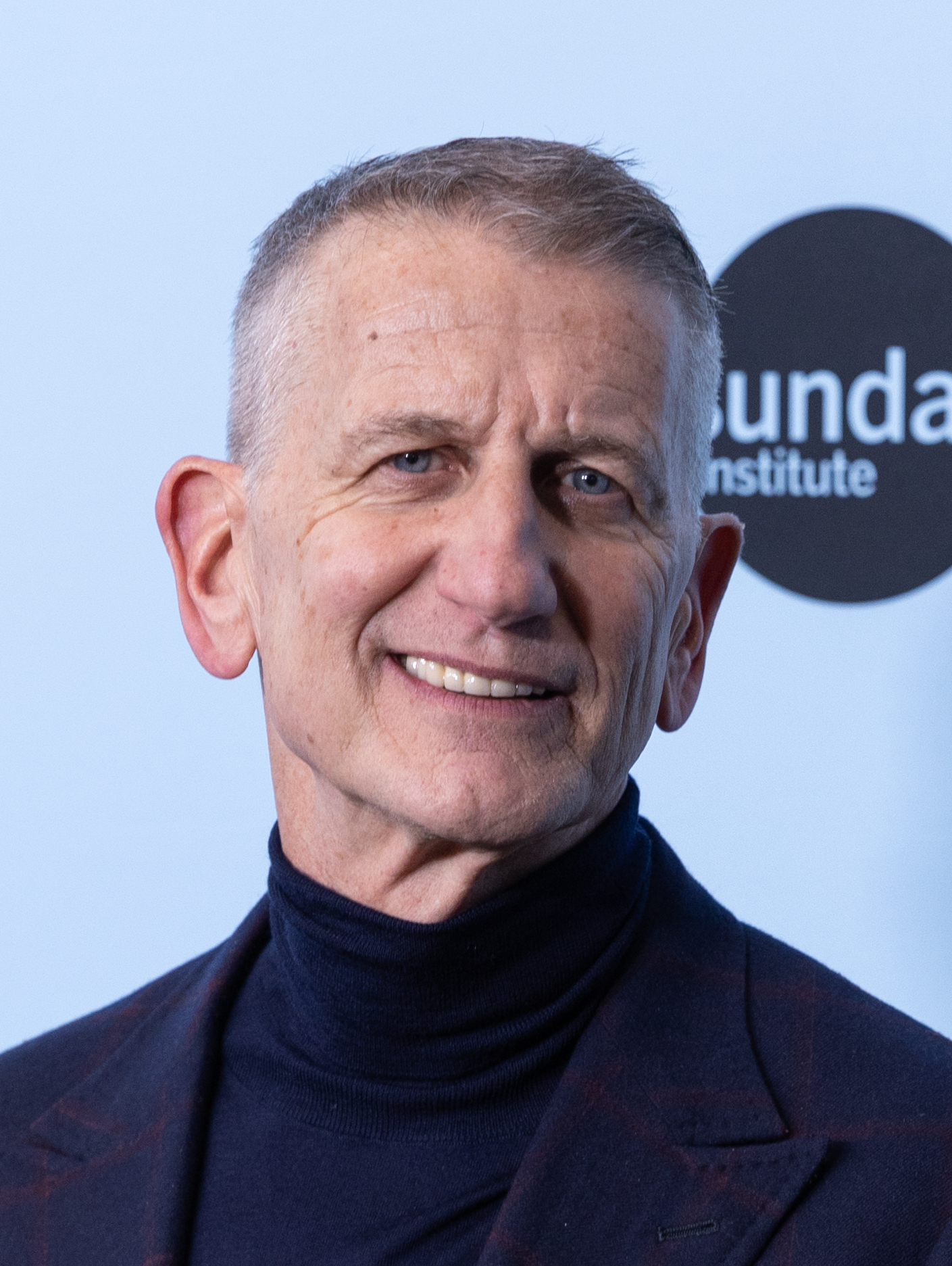
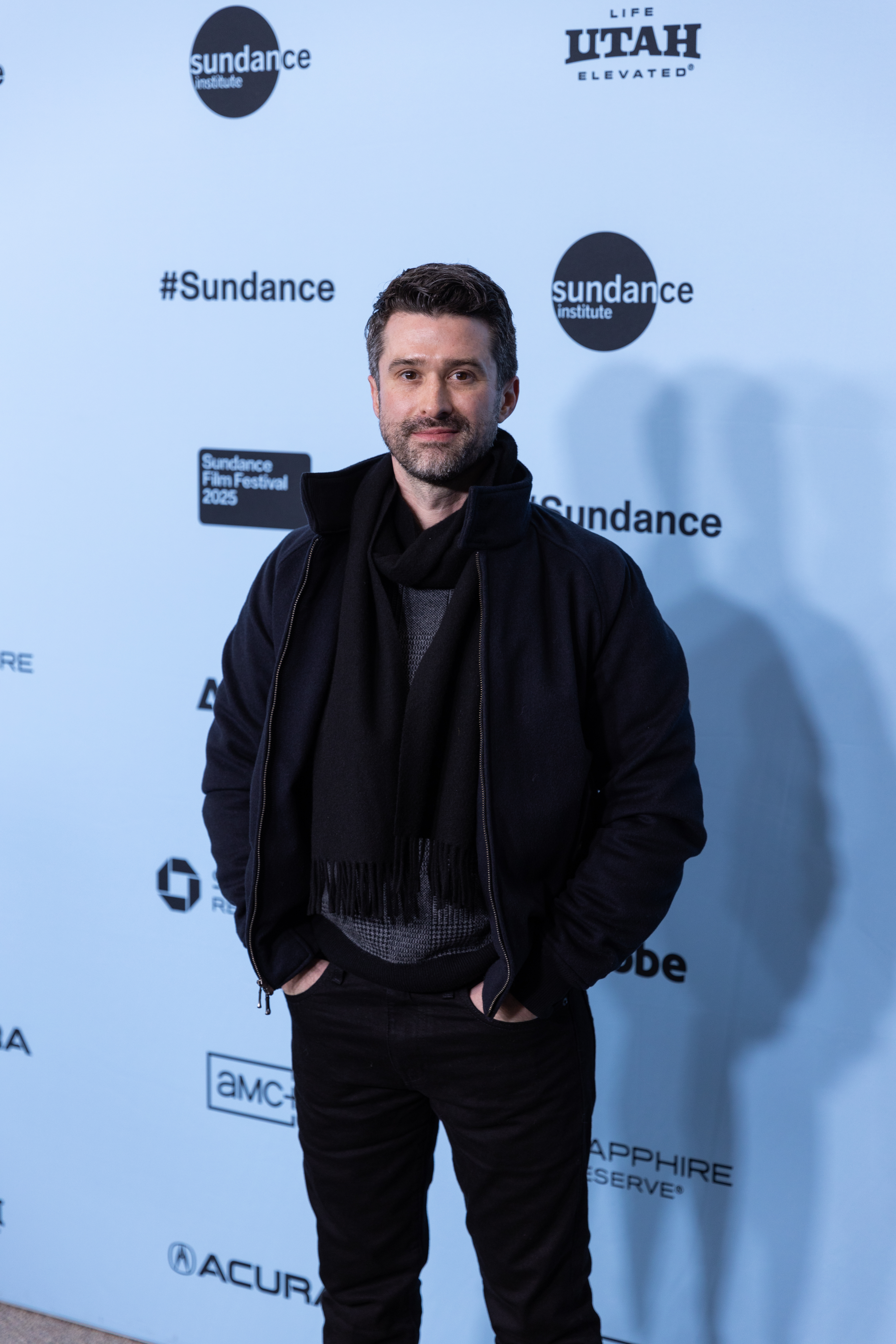
Writer/director Bill Condon and producers Barry Josephson, Tom Kirdahy and Greg Yolen

In December 2023, Jennifer Lopez was announced to star as Ingrid Luna in a film adaptation of the musical with Bill Condon directing from his own screenplay. The independently-financed production was executive produced by Lopez, Elaine Goldsmith-Thomas and Benny Medina through their Nuyorican Productions banner, while Barry Josephson, Tom Kirdahy and Greg Yolen served as producers. Choreographer Sergio Trujillo and co-choreographer Brandon Bieber created the dance sequences throughout. Christopher Scott choreographed "Gimme Love". Upon the announcement, a casting call opened for an unknown to play the role of Molina.

In March 2024, dancer Tony Dovolani announced on his Instagram page that he had joined the cast as mob boss Johnny Desiderio. In April, it was announced that Diego Luna and Tonatiuh had joined the cast as Valentin Arregui and Luis Molina, with Ben Affleck and Matt Damon boarding the project as executive producers through the Artists Equity banner. Luna also served as an executive producer. Lopez and Luna were Condon's "first and only" choices for their roles, while Tonatiuh was selected from hundreds of actors who auditioned.

Colleen Atwood served as costume designer. Composer and pianist Sam Davis wrote the incidental underscore for the dialogue scenes, marking his film scoring debut after collaborating with Condon as the dance music arranger for Disney's live-action remake of Beauty and the Beast (2017).

=== Filming ===
On March 20, 2024, Lopez announced that production on the film had begun, with the intention to have a fast turnaround time so she can launch her This Is Me... Live tour on June 26, which was later cancelled on May 31. Principal photography began in New Jersey on March 21, 2024. On May 10, Lopez confirmed on Live with Kelly and Mark that she completed filming on her scenes and that she lost weight for the role of Aurora, describing the shoot as "equal parts exhilarating and exhausting". Her "elaborate" musical numbers were each filmed in one take. Production wrapped on June 16, 2024.

The film is dedicated to the memories of Ebb (who died in 2004), McNally (who died in 2020 from COVID-19) and Chita Rivera (who originated the title role on stage and died in 2024) as well as William Hurt (who originated the role of Luis Molina in the original 1985 film and died in 2022).

=== Music ===
The film's soundtrack album was released on October 3, 2025, by Lakeshore Records. Lopez's rendition of the title song was released as a promotional single on September 5, 2025. Another song by Lopez ("Never You") and a song by Tonatiuh ("She's a Woman") were released before the soundtrack album release as promotional singles.

==== Musical numbers ====
- "Prologue" – Orchestra
- "Her Name Is Aurora (Staff)" – Ensemble
- "I Will Dance Alone" – Aurora and Molina
- "Her Name Is Aurora (Gala)" – Aurora and Ensemble
- "An Everyday Man" – Armando and Aurora
- "She's a Woman" – Molina
- "Where You Are" – Aurora and Ensemble
- "Dear One (Querido)" – Federico Salles and Alejandro Ernesto Balbis Ortíz
- "I Do Miracles" – Aurora
- "A Visit" – Spider Woman and Molina
- "Gimme Love" – Aurora, Molina, and Aurora's Men
- "Never You" – Aurora
- "Kiss of the Spider Woman" – Spider Woman
- "Only in the Movies" – Molina and the People in His Life

== Stage-to-screen changes ==
In adapting the musical to the screen, Condon cited Bob Fosse's 1972 film adaptation of another Kander and Ebb musical, Cabaret, as a source of inspiration. This resulted in cutting almost every song set in reality at the prison where Molina and Arregui are held (including "Dressing Them Up," "Over the Wall" and "The Day After That") and only keeping the ones set in the "fantasies" Molina comes up with (except for "And the Moon Grows Dimmer," "Come" and "Anything for Him") in order to create a stark contrast between the grittiness of prison life in Argentina during the Dirty War and the Technicolor lavishness and beauty of a classic MGM musical film.

As a result, the aspect ratio shifts between the 1.85∶1 format during the prison scenes and the 1.33∶1 format for the fantasy sequences. In addition, three new songs were written for the film by Kander with existing additional lyrical material by Ebb, entitled "I Will Dance Alone", "Never You", and "An Everyday Man" (which were all actually used in the original, very different 1990 premiere production of the musical in Purchase, New York).

== Release ==
Kiss of the Spider Woman was released in the United States on October 10, 2025. It had its world premiere at the Sundance Film Festival on January 26, 2025, marking Condon's first film premiere at the festival since Gods and Monsters (1998), and received a standing ovation from the audience, which reportedly left Lopez in tears. It later held additional screenings at the festival, with all showings of the film being sold-out in advance of the premiere.

In February 2025, AGC Studios boarded onto the film to handle international sales to buyers at the 2025 European Film Market, while William Morris Endeavor and CAA Media Finance handled U.S. sales. In March 2025, Lionsgate, Roadside Attractions and LD Entertainment were reportedly in final talks to acquire North American distribution rights to the film; the deal closed not long after, with Mickey Liddell joining the executive producing team, alongside plans for a wide theatrical awards season release sometime in fall that year. Searchlight Pictures and Mubi also expressed interest in the rights a month prior to Lionsgate's purchase. It held its international premiere as the closing night film of the 78th Locarno Film Festival on August 16, 2025, and held its Canadian premiere as the closing night film of the 2025 Atlantic International Film Festival on September 17, 2025. In late March 2026, it was announced by distributor Sony Pictures UK that the film will be released in the United Kingdom on April 17th, 2026.

=== Marketing ===
The film's promotional campaign launched on June 5, 2025, with the release of the teaser trailer. The following day, Lopez made an appearance at the 2025 WorldPride celebration in Washington, D.C. to share an exclusive clip from the film and perform the title song live for the first time. The official trailer was released on August 20, 2025, alongside the poster.

== Reception ==
=== Box office ===
Kiss of the Spider Woman opened on October 10, 2025 in 1,331 theaters, and earned $351,496 in its first day, ultimately grossing $891,046 for the weekend, ranking twelfth at the domestic box office, and fourth among the new releases behind Tron: Ares, Roofman and Soul on Fire.

Despite the film's significant under-performance at the box office, grossing $1.8 million against a budget of $30 million, Lopez's performance was generally well received and garnered moderate buzz for the Best Supporting Actress race at the awards seasons.

=== Critical response ===
On the review aggregator website Rotten Tomatoes, 76% of 165 critics' reviews are positive, with an average rating of 6.8/10. The website's consensus reads: "Weaving a visually sumptuous web of musical intrigue, Kiss of the Spider Woman showcases beauty in tragedy through wondrous performances by Jennifer Lopez, Tonatiuh Elizarraraz and Diego Luna." Metacritic, which uses a weighted average, assigned the film a score of 63 out of 100, based on 36 critics, indicating "generally favorable" reviews.

Fionnuala Halligan of Screendaily lamented that despite the "committed" and "sincere" cast, "it's disappointing that what they are peddling has become so distorted". Pete Hammond of Deadline Hollywood wrote about a "stunning new film adaptation" in which Condon demonstrates that the musical genre is "still fresh and alive and relevant even on the budget of independent filmmaking". Aisha Harris of NPR wrote "Luna and Lopez are great, but this is Tonatiuh's movie -- he takes a role that could easily be a caricature of queer flamboyance and pathos, and grounds it with depth and soul." Kevin Fallon of The Daily Beast wrote "Condon confirms that he's simply unrivaled when it comes to directing movie musicals, and the three leads deliver a trifecta of tour de forces."

David Rooney of The Hollywood Reporter delivered as a bottom line the following assessment: "entertaining, even if it soars only intermittently". Ryan Lattanzio of IndieWire gave the film a 'C+' rating, wondering what's a "star-making performance [Tonatiuh's] when the package surrounding the actor is otherwise so ordinary and un-cosmic?" Peter Debruge of Variety praised how Condon gives Tonatiuh his Jennifer Hudson moment in "She's a Woman".

In contrast, Benjamin Lee of The Guardian wrote that “we’re in safest hands with Lopez and Condon when he’s playing in that sandbox as the cell-based scenes can be a little stagey and rushed in comparison”, with Collider’s Bill Bonaime also expressing that Lopez “is a blast in a musical that struggles without her.” Mae Abdulbaki of Screen Rant praised both the film and Lopez, writing "Lopez has had a successful singing career, but she’s never sounded better than in this lavish musical. Thrilling and sharp dance numbers, glitzy costumes, and campy dialogue all come together to create a dazzling, show-stopping musical that, while not perfect, had my audience clapping after a few of the onscreen performances." By mid-September (three weeks prior to the film’s theatrical release), awards prospects for the performance of Tonatiuh have dwindled, while those of Lopez’s have steadily risen. Scott Feinberg of The Hollywood Reporter lists Lopez as a frontrunner for a nomination in the Best Supporting Actress category at the 98th Academy Awards, with IndieWire's Marcus Jones and Variety’s Clayton Davis also ranking her as a strong contender.

=== Accolades ===
Award	Year	Category	Nominee(s)	Result	Ref.
GLAAD Media Awards	2026	Outstanding Film – Wide Release	Kiss of the Spider Woman	Won	
Dorian Awards	2026	Unsung LGBTQ Film of the Year	Kiss of the Spider Woman	Nominated	
Dorian Awards	2026	Campiest Flick	Kiss of the Spider Woman	Nominated	
Dorian Awards	2026	Rising Star of the Year	Tonatiuh	Nominated	
SDSA Awards	2026	Best Achievement in Décor/Design of a Comedy or Musical Feature Film	Set Decoration by Andrew Baseman SDSA; Production Design by Scott Chambliss	Nominated	
Critics' Choice Awards	2026	Best Costume Design	Colleen Atwood, Christine Cantella	Nominated	
Las Vegas Film Critics Society	2025	Best Costume Design	Colleen Atwood, Christine Cantella	Nominated	
Austin Film Critics Association	2025	Dual Threat Special Award	Diego Luna, Tonatiuh, Jennifer Lopez	Won	
Chicago Film Critics Association	2025	Most Promising Performer	Tonatiuh	Nominated	
Astra Creative Arts Awards	2025	Best Makeup	Scott Barnes	Nominated	
Gotham Independent Film Awards	2025	Breakthrough Performer	Tonatiuh	Nominated	
Savannah Film Festival	2025	Virtuoso Award	Jennifer Lopez	Won	
Celebration of Cinema and Television	2025	Breakthrough Award	Tonatiuh	Won	
Hamptons Film Festival	2025	Sherzum Award	Kiss of the Spider Woman	Won	
Hamptons Film Festival	2025	Breakthrough Perfomer Award	Tonatiuh	Won	
Mill Valley Film Festival	2025	MVFF Award	Tonatiuh	Won	
Nashville Film Festival	2025	Rising Star Award	Tonatiuh	Won	
Locarno Film Festival	2025	Prix du public UBS	Kiss of the Spider Woman	Nominated	
