= Tonatiuh (actor) =

American actor

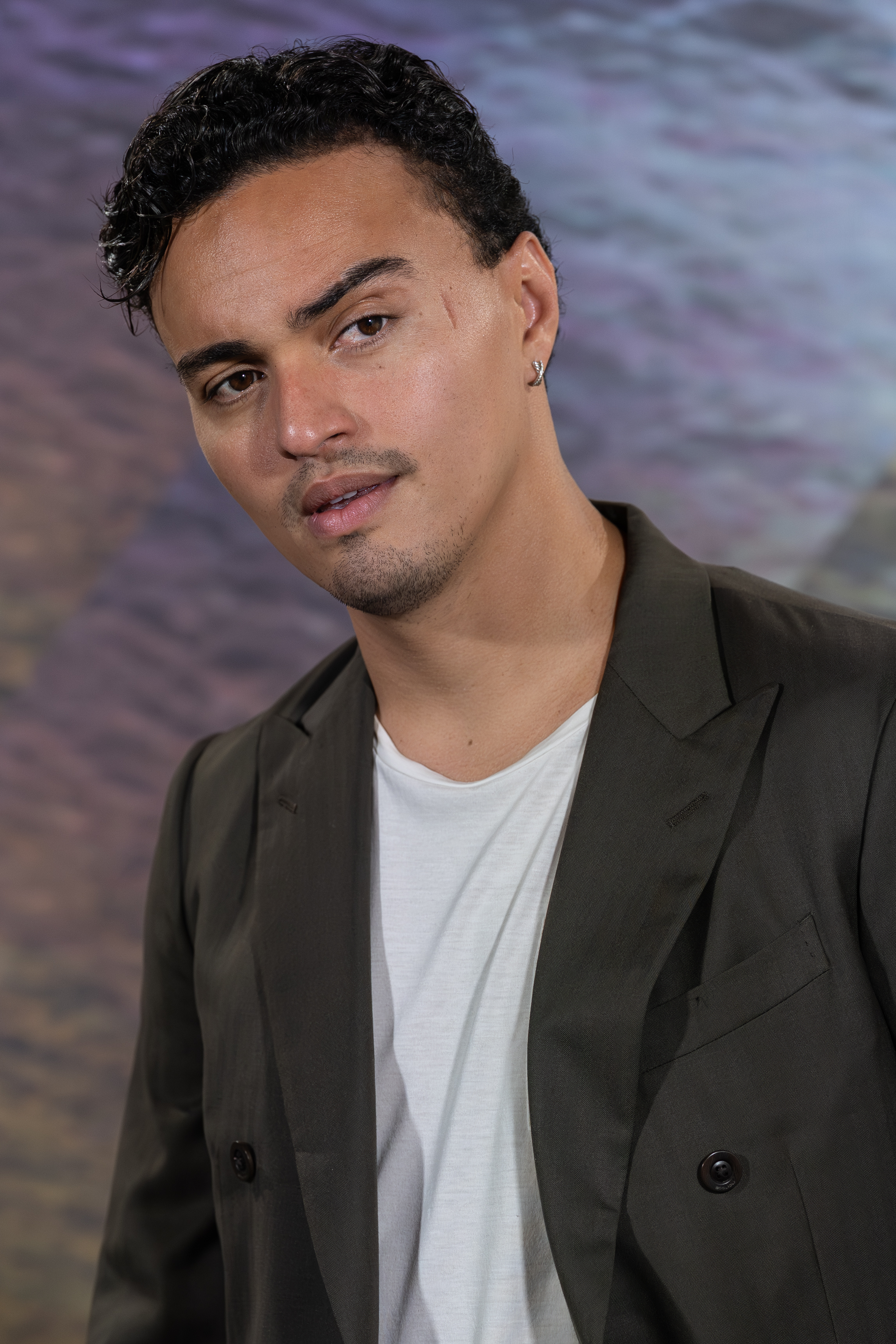
- Tonatiuh at a photo call during the 2025 Locarno Film Festival
- Born: Tonatiuh Elizarraraz; January 3, 1993 (age 33) or January 3, 1995 (age 31) (sources differ); Los Angeles, California, U.S.
- Education: University of Southern California
- Occupation: Actor
- Years active: 2015–present

Tonatiuh Elizarraraz (Spanish: [toˈnatiw]; born January 3, 1993 or 1995), known professionally as Tonatiuh is an American actor, known for featuring in the series Vida (2018–2020), the American soap opera Promised Land (2022), and the film Kiss of the Spider Woman (2025).

== Life ==
Tonatiuh was born in Los Angeles to immigrant parents from Mexico. He (Note: Elizarraraz uses both he/him and they/them pronouns. This article uses he/him for consistency.) grew up in the neighborhood of West Covina with his mother, older brother, and grandmother. His mother cut hair in a beauty salon to support the family.

He graduated from the University of Southern California School of Dramatic Arts.

Tonatiuh is queer and has spoken openly about the importance of authentic representation in media.

== Career ==
In 2021, Tonatiuh made his film acting debut in a minor role in the independent comedy film Shoplifters of the World. In 2024, he played a supporting role in the Netflix action thriller film Carry-On. He then starred alongside Jennifer Lopez and Diego Luna in Bill Condon's musical drama film Kiss of the Spider Woman, which premiered at the 2025 Sundance Film Festival. He played Luis Molina, a jailed, gay window dresser. In a mixed review of the film, David Rooney of The Hollywood Reporter wrote, "In a head-turning breakout performance, [Tonatiuh] can flip from proud to humiliated, self-dramatizing to selfless, often within a single line reading".

== Filmography ==
=== Film ===
Year	Title	Role	Notes
2021	Shoplifters of the World	Brian	
2024	Carry-On	Mateo Flores	
2025	Kiss of the Spider Woman	Luis Molina/Kendall Nesbitt	
2025	Roses on the Vine	Cosmo	

=== Television ===
Year	Title	Role	Notes
2016	Jane the Virgin	Javi	1 episode
2018	Danny the Manny	Mimi	3 episodes
2017	Stargate Origins	Motawk	1 episode
2018	Kismet	Himself	Guest; Season 13: Episode 6
2018–present	The Loud House	Miguel (voice)	9 episodes
2019	Chicago Med	Sebastian Lopez	1 episode
2018–2020	Vida	Marcos	Recurring role
2020	Drunk Bus	Justin	
2020	Hot Spot	Carlos	1 episode
2021–2022	Hidden Canyons	Colby Cardenas	Series regular
2022	Promised Land	Antonio Sandoval	Series regular
2022	Angelyne	Andre Casiano	1 episode
2026	Love Story	Narciso Rodriguez	5 episodes
