= Bill Condon =

American screenwriter and director

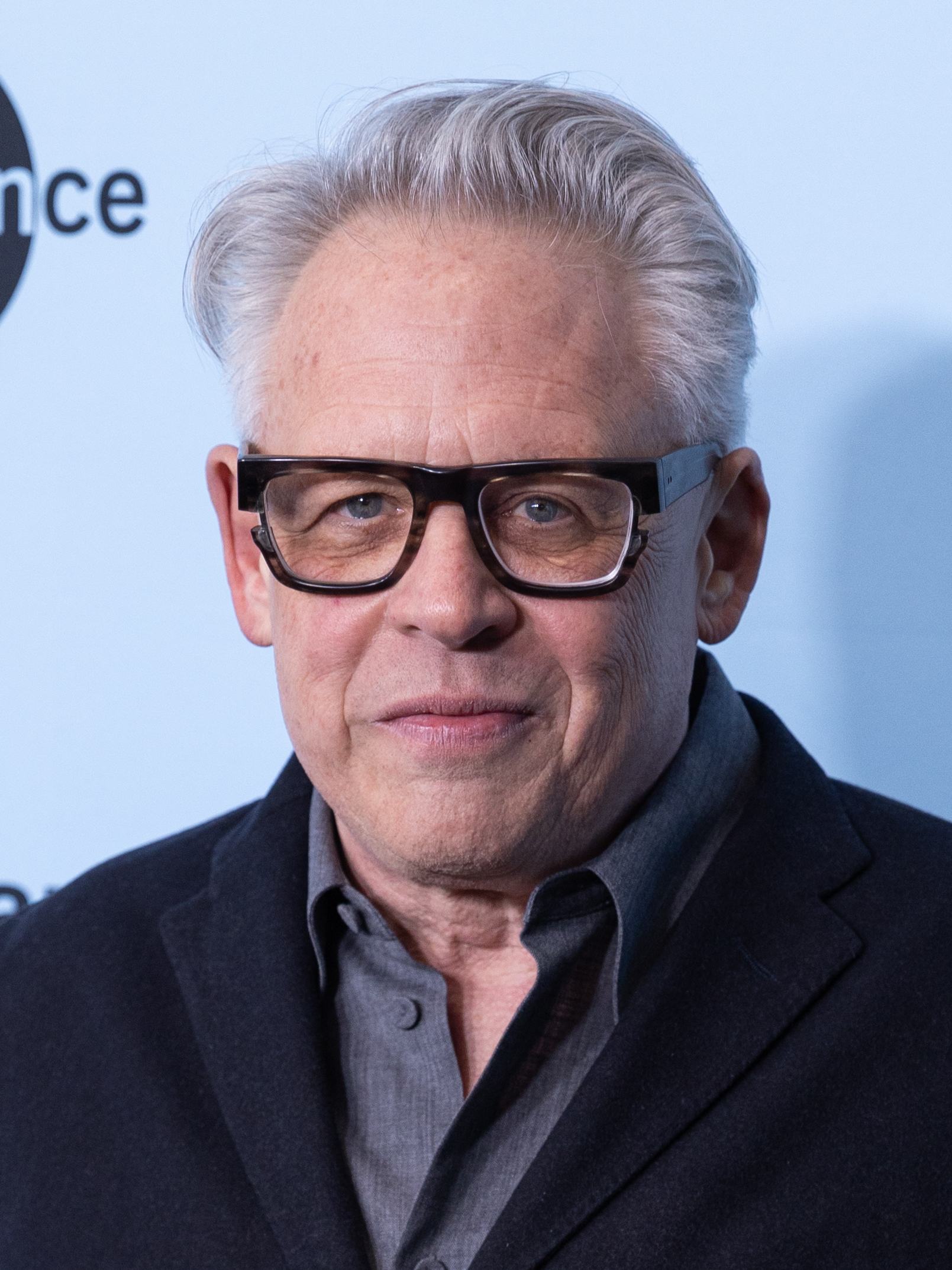
- Condon at the 2025 Sundance Film Festival.
- Born: William Condon; October 22, 1955 (age 70); New York City, New York, U.S.
- Occupations: Film director, screenwriter
- Years active: 1981–present
- Notable work: Gods and Monsters; Chicago; Kinsey; Dreamgirls; The Twilight Saga: Breaking Dawn – Part 1 The Twilight Saga: Breaking Dawn – Part 2 Beauty and the Beast
- Partner: Jack Morrissey
- Awards: Academy Award for Best Adapted Screenplay; Gods and Monsters (1998)

William Condon (born October 22, 1955) is an American director and screenwriter. Condon is known for writing and/or directing numerous successful and acclaimed films including Gods and Monsters, Chicago, Kinsey, Dreamgirls, The Twilight Saga: Breaking Dawn – Part 1, Part 2, and Beauty and the Beast. He has received two nominations for the Academy Award for Best Adapted Screenplay, Gods and Monsters and Chicago, winning for the former.

== Early life ==
Condon was born in New York City on October 22, 1955, the son of a police detective, and was raised in an Irish Catholic family. He attended Regis High School and Columbia College of Columbia University, graduating in 1976 with a degree in philosophy.

Two films had a significant impact of Condon's early life. At the age of twelve, he found himself drawn to screenplay writing with his first viewing of Bonnie and Clyde. In college he saw Sweet Charity (1969), which led to "a lifelong love affair with movies that are reviled and rejected in their time."

After completing college, Condon worked as a journalist for film magazines, including American Film and Millimeter. In 1981, he won "the world's most difficult film trivia quiz" sponsored by The Village Voice.

== Career ==
His career as a filmmaker began with screenplays for the independent feature Strange Behavior (1981), an homage to the pulp horror films of the 1950s, and the science-fiction feature Strange Invaders (1983), which starred Nancy Allen and Wallace Shawn.

His directorial debut was Sister, Sister (1987), an eerie Southern Gothic mystery starring Eric Stoltz and Jennifer Jason Leigh. Test screenings led to major changes to the film, which still proved a critical failure that set back Condon's career.

Condon emerged a few years later directing a series of made-for-TV thrillers, including Murder 101 (1991), which earned Condon and co-writer Roy Johansen a 1992 Edgar Award for their screenplay. During this period he also wrote the screenplay for the thriller F/X2 (1991), which was directed by Australian director Richard Franklin.

In 1994, he directed the television movie The Man Who Wouldn't Die, which was met with mixed reviews. He directed Candyman: Farewell to the Flesh (1995), a sequel to Bernard Rose's 1992 horror film. It was a critical and commercial failure. Reminded years later of this phase of his career, Condon said: "It's hard to be lower on the totem pole than being the director for a sequel to a horror movie."

Condon wrote and directed Gods and Monsters (1998), which was based on a novel by Christopher Bram. His screenplay won the Academy Award for Best Adapted Screenplay. The New York Times said Condon "may have been the most stunned person at the Academy Awards when his name was announced as the winner for the best adapted screenplay. He has struggled for years in Hollywood as a screenwriter and journalist and is unaccustomed to the hoopla that is now around him." He was nominated for the same award for his screenplay for Chicago, based on the Broadway musical of the same name. He received a second Edgar Award for his Chicago screenplay as well.

In 2004 he wrote and directed the film Kinsey, chronicling the life of the controversial sex researcher Alfred Kinsey. In The New York Times, A.O. Scott wrote that "Bill Condon's smart, stirring [film] has a lot to say on the subject of sex, which it treats with sobriety, sensitivity and a welcome measure of humor." He continued: "I can't think of another movie that has dealt with sex so knowledgeably and, at the same time, made the pursuit of knowledge seem so sexy. There are some explicit images and provocative scenes, but it is your intellect that is most likely to be aroused.... Mr. Condon's great achievement is to turn Kinsey's complicated and controversial career into a grand intellectual drama."

In 2005, he received the Stephen F. Kolzak Award at the GLAAD Media Awards.

Condon wrote the screenplay for and directed Dreamgirls, an adaptation of the acclaimed Broadway musical of the same name. It was released in December 2006. Condon received Directors Guild of America and Broadcast Film Critics Association nominations for directing. The film was nominated for eight Academy Awards in six categories.

Condon was executive producer of the 81st Academy Awards television broadcast that aired on February 22, 2009, working with producer Laurence Mark.

Condon directed both parts of The Twilight Saga: Breaking Dawn (2011 and 2012), adapted from the fourth and final novel in The Twilight Saga by Stephenie Meyer. He was twice nominated for a Razzie for Worst Director for these films, winning for Part 2.

Condon directed The Fifth Estate (2013), a thriller about WikiLeaks starring Benedict Cumberbatch. He said he chose the project for a change of pace and liked its non-ideological approach to a very complex subject. He saw it "in the great tradition of journalistic thrillers". It received mixed responses from critics and underperformed at the box office.

In late 2013, he directed a revised version of the 1997 stage musical Side Show at the La Jolla Playhouse. A production of this revision played in June and July 2014 at the Kennedy Center. Charles Isherwood described it in The New York Times as "a full-scale reimagining" of the musical that involved "the addition and subtraction of several songs ..., the reordering of others", and new dialogue contributed by Condon. That production received excellent reviews when it moved to Broadway in the fall, but it proved a failure at the box office and closed after just seven weeks.

In 2015, Condon directed Mr. Holmes starring Ian McKellen. Condon noted its similarity to Gods and Monsters, not only because of its lead actor but because "[b]oth movies are about aging and mortality. You have a celebrated man facing the decline of his public image."

Condon directed the 2017 Disney's live action film adaptation, based on the animated 1991 film Beauty and the Beast, starring Emma Watson and Dan Stevens. A few weeks before the film's scheduled release on March 17, 2017, Condon announced that one character, LeFou, has "a nice, exclusively gay moment", which resulted in an "internet meltdown" of contrasting support and condemnation.

He co-authored the screenplay for The Greatest Showman, a biography of P.T. Barnum, starring Hugh Jackman and released in December 2017. He rewrote the draft of co-author Jenny Bicks.

In October 2017, Condon postponed pre-production of a remake of Bride of Frankenstein for Universal Pictures. Deadline Hollywood reported that Condon and David Koepp wanted to rework the script.

Condon is a member of the Independent Feature Projects (IFP) in Los Angeles, a non-profit organization which supports independent films, as well as the Independent Writers Steering Committee, which was initiated by the Writers Guild of America (WGA).

In July 2021, Condon signed on to direct a Guys and Dolls movie adaptation by TriStar Pictures but left the project in 2023 and was replaced by Chicago director Rob Marshall. That same year, he co-produced the live stage filming of the Broadway production of Come from Away, which was released to streaming on Apple TV+.

In December 2023, it was announced that Condon would write and direct a film adaptation of the musical version of Kiss of the Spider Woman, with Jennifer Lopez attached to star and co-executive produce.

In July 2026, it was revealed that Condon was filming his next film, The Road Home, in South Africa. It is about Hugh Masekela and the conflict he faced from recording with Paul Simon during apartheid.

== Personal life ==
Condon is gay. He is in a long-term relationship with Jack Morrissey.

== Filmography ==
=== Film ===
Year	Title	Director	Writer	Notes
1981	Strange Behavior	No	Yes	Also associate producer
1983	Strange Invaders	No	Yes	Nominated- Saturn Award for Best Writing
1987	Sister, Sister	Yes	Yes	
1991	F/X2	No	Yes	
1995	Candyman: Farewell to the Flesh	Yes	No	
1998	Gods and Monsters	Yes	Yes	Academy Award for Best Adapted Screenplay
2002	Chicago	No	Yes	Nominated- Academy Award for Best Adapted Screenplay; Nominated- Golden Globe Award for Best Screenplay
2004	Kinsey	Yes	Yes	
2006	Dreamgirls	Yes	Yes	
2007	Shortcut to Happiness	No	Yes	Filmed in 2001
2011	The Twilight Saga: Breaking Dawn – Part 1	Yes	No	
2012	The Twilight Saga: Breaking Dawn – Part 2	Yes	No	
2013	The Fifth Estate	Yes	No	
2015	Mr. Holmes	Yes	No	
2017	Beauty and the Beast	Yes	No	
2017	The Greatest Showman	No	Yes	
2019	The Good Liar	Yes	No	
2025	Kiss of the Spider Woman	Yes	Yes	Also executive producer
TBA	The Road Home †	Yes	No	Filming

Producer

- The Good Liar (2019)
- Come from Away (2021)

=== Television ===
TV movies

Year	Title	Director	Producer	Writer
1991	Murder 101	Yes	No	Yes
1991	White Lie	Yes	No	No
1991	Dead in the Water	Yes	No	No
1993	Deadly Relations	Yes	No	No
1995	The Man Who Wouldn't Die	Yes	Yes	No

TV series

Year	Title	Director	Executive producer	Episode
2000	The Others	Yes	No	"1112"
2010	The Big C	Yes	Yes	"Pilot"
2011	Tilda	Yes	Yes	Unaired pilot

== See also ==
- List of LGBTQ Academy Award winners and nominees
- Dramatic license
- LGBT culture in New York City
- List of LGBT people from New York City
