= List of members of the Mexican Academy of Language =

The Mexican Academy of Language (Spanish: Academia Mexicana de la Lengua) divides its members into several categories: numerarios ("full"), honorarios ("honorary") and correspondientes ("correspondent").

== Director ==
The Academy's director for the 2023–2027 term is Gonzalo Celorio.

== Full members ==
Since September 2026, the current Académicos de número of the Academy are, in the order of the seats they occupy:

1. Alejandro Higashi
2. Adolfo Castañón
3. Patrick Johansson Keraudren
4. Tarsicio Herrera Zapién (vacant after his death) (Note: The academy usually waits for a year after the death of its member before reassigning the chair. Source: "Despiden a Vicente Quirarte, "artesano de la palabra y caballero de las letras"" (in Spanish). La Jornada. August 13, 2026.)
5. Concepción Company Company
6. José Luis Díaz Gómez
7. Angelina Muñiz-Huberman
8. Fernando Fernández
9. Fernando Serrano Migallón
10. Liliana Weinberg Marchevsky
11. Yolanda Lastra
12. Roger Bartra
13. Jorge Ruiz Dueñas
14. María Eugenia Vázquez Laslop
15. Eduardo Matos Moctezuma
16. Diego Valadés Ríos
17. Felipe Garrido
18. Hugo Hiriart
19. Jesús Silva-Herzog Márquez
20. Germán Viveros Maldonado
21. Ascensión Hernández Triviño
22. Carlos Prieto
23. Fernando Nava López
24. Margit Frenk (vacant after her death)
25. Armando González Torres
26. Gonzalo Celorio
27. Jaime Labastida
28. Pedro Martín Butragueño
29. Javier Garciadiego
30. Marina Garone Gravier
31. Vicente Quirarte (vacant after his death)
32. Flavio González Mello
33. Rodrigo Martínez Baracs
34. Silvia Molina
35. Margo Glantz
36. Rosa Beltrán

== Honorary members ==
The Académicos Honorarios have included:

Mexican

- Antonio Alatorre
- Carlos Fuentes
- Juliana González Valenzuela
- José Justo Gómez de la Cortina
- Alfonso Herrera
- Octavio Paz
- José Sarukhán Kermez

Foreign

- Dámaso Alonso
- Germán Arciniegas
- Samuel Arguedas
- Miguel Antonio Caro
- Rufino José Cuervo
- Atilio Dell'Oro Maini
- Laureano García Ortiz
- Víctor García de la Concha
- Antonio Gómez Restrepo
- Lorenzo Marroquín
- Luis Eduardo Nieto Caballero
- Salomón de la Selva
- Gutierre Tibón
- Aurelio Tió

== Correspondent members ==
Notable académicos correspondientes have included: Miguel Alessio Robles, Salvador Díaz Mirón, Genaro Estrada, Pablo González Casanova, Luis González y González, José Gorostiza, Francisco de Icaza, Amado Nervo, Manuel José Othón, Manuel Payno, Sergio Pitol, Vicente Riva Palacio, Luis G. Urbina, and Felipe San José y González and Natalio Hernández.

== Former members ==
- Miguel León-Portilla - chair 7
- Ruy Pérez Tamayo - chair 8
- Eduardo Lizalde - chair 14
- Julieta Fierro Gossman - chair 25
- Aurelio González Pérez - chair 30
