= Blasco =

Blasco is a surname which roots can be found it in Aragon, more specifically in the Jaca's mountains.

== People ==
- Blasco de Garay, Spanish navy captain and inventor
- Blasco de Grañén, Aragonese painter
- Blasco Gardéliz de Ezcároz, bishop of Pamplona
- Blasco Giurato, Italian cinematographer
- Blasco I d'Alagona, Aragonese nobleman
- Blasco II d'Alagona, Sicilian regent
- Blasco Núñez Vela, Spanish viceroy of Peru
- Carl Blasco, French triathlete
- Eduardo Blasco Ferrer, Spanish-Italian linguist
- Elena Blasco (born 1950), Spanish artist
- Eusebio Blasco, Spanish journalist, poet and playwright
- Gregorio Blasco, Spanish footballer
- Humberto Blasco, Paraguayan politician
- Jesús Blasco, Spanish author and artist
- Joan Lerma i Blasco, Spanish politician
- Joe Blasco, American makeup artist
- José Ruiz y Blasco, Spanish painter and art teacher
- Josep Maria Rañé i Blasco, Catalan politician
- Manuel Blasco de Nebra, Spanish organist and composer
- María Blasco Marhuenda, Spanish biologist
- Michael Blasco, American Entrepreneur
- Michele Blasco, Italian painter and architect
- Miguel Blasco, Spanish musical producer
- Miriam Blasco, Spanish judoka
- Paloma Gay y Blasco, social anthropologist
- Ruth Gloria Blasco Ibáñez, American film actress
- Vicente Blasco Ibáñez, Spanish journalist, politician and novelist
- Víctor Blasco, Spanish footballer
- Betty Peterson Blasco, lyricist of the song “My Happiness”
- Amber Blasco, Celebrity Makeup Artist

== Other ==
- Alicante Bouschet, wine grape variety
- Avenida de Blasco Ibañez, avenue in the Spanish city of Valencia
- Blasco Ibáñez (Madrid Metro), station on Line 1 of the Metro Ligero

== See also ==
- Blasko (disambiguation page)
