= Jesús Silva =

Jesús Silva may refer to:

- Jesús Silva Herzog (1892–1985), Mexican economist and historian, father of:
  - Jesús Silva-Herzog Flores (1935–2017), Mexican economist and politician, father of:
    - Jesús Silva-Herzog Márquez (born 1965), Mexican journalist and writer, member of the Academia Mexicana de la Lengua
- Jesús Silva Fernández (1962–2025), Spanish diplomat, ambassador to Jamaica
