= Cristina Sánchez (disambiguation) =

Cristina Sánchez (born 1972) is a Spanish bullfighter.

Cristina Sánchez may also refer to:

- Cristina Sánchez (molecular biologist) (born 1971), Spanish scientist
- Cristina Sánchez-Andrade (born 1968), Spanish writer and translator
- Cristina Sánchez Ruiz (born 1978), Spanish flamenco singer
- Cristina Sánchez Serna (born 1959), Spanish volleyball player
