= Beyond the Islands =

Ecuadorian novel by Alicia Yánez Cossío

- Author: Alicia Yánez Cossío
- Language: Spanish
- Published: 1980
- Publisher: Imprenta Don Bosco
- Publication place: Ecuador

Beyond the Islands (in Spanish: Más allá de las islas) is a novel by the Ecuadorian writer Alicia Yánez Cossío, published in Quito, Ecuador in 1980. The plot, framed in the genre of magic realism, follows the story of eight people who travel to the Galápagos Islands to escape Death. The work was translated into English in 2011 by Amalia Gladhart.

Yánez has stated that it was the most difficult of her books to write, and she considered it the best of her novels.

== Writing and structure ==
The first version of the book told the story of a writer who traveled to the Galápagos Islands in order to forget about her marital problems, caused by her husband's infidelity. However, noting that the novel had acquired many autobiographical elements, Yánez decided to edit it, remove the character of the writer, and include a unifying thread of the storyline in the figure of Death, which had become one of the author's obsessions at the time.

Yánez began writing the novel in the middle of 1976 and was finished in 1980. To gather information about the Galápagos, Yánez made two visits to the islands, in addition to reading as many books as she could find about them. On the basis of these facts she created the characters, some of whom were completely invented and others based on real people and incidents. One example was the visit of a European princess that Yánez witnessed during her stay in Galápagos, and for whose reception the school teacher prepared a great event which all the students participated in, but given that the princess arrived wearing jeans and casual clothes, nobody could recognize her.

The novel is divided into eight chapters, each one of which follows a different character in their attempt to evade Death. The chapters are narrated in the third person and take the name of the character in question, with relatively independent in that they contrast the problems of civilization with life in the surroundings of nature in Galápagos.

== Main characters ==
- Morgan: an old limping pirate who claims to be the grandson of the famous pirate Woodes Rogers. At the beginning of the book he temporarily escapes from the island because of a volcano eruption. He dies, after which a dragonfly larva eats his body after getting in his wooden leg.
- Alirio: a poet who arrives on the island after losing inspiration.
- Iridia: married to Morgan, who she sees as like a mythical being. After he dies, she starts to see different men from the island in her room for pity and in a selfless way, returning their vitality and capacity to love. She tries to relive her love for Morgan and to have a child. According to the author, Iridia is based on the protagonist of the Spanish film Viridiana.
- Fritz: a scientist obsessed with prickly pears and with the Galápagos Islands, which he calls "the woman of bare breasts". Although his wife tries to seduce him, Fritz seems to only have eyes for Galápagos.
- Estenia: when she realizes that marrying would mean being shut inside and losing all possibility of self-realization, she decides to study to become a teacher and to move to work in the school on the island, expressing her maternal instinct with her students. In her educational documents, she sees herself as the successor of Prometheus.
- Tarsilia: the mother of Iridia, who arrives on the island desperate to find her daughter.
- Brigita: the witch doctor of the island. Her knowledge of medicinal plants allows her to heal countless illnesses of the townspeople. However, the religious fanaticism of the town priest and of her aunt, who brand her as a witch, incites the inhabitants to blame her for the famine and women's infertility and to burn her alive. Her death triggers the events that leave the island deserted.
- Richardson: a German tourist who is obsessed with the legend of the disappearance of the Baroness Wagner. He decides to order a plastic replica of the baroness to be made and to move with it to the island, where he begins to work as a baker with provisions of flour sent as "aid from a big country to a little country". However, at the end of the novel he discovers that the flour is mixed with contraceptives with the intention of testing their effectiveness, which has caused the infertility of the women on the island.
- Death: for the greater part of the novel, she is described as a pale, feminine figure and like a "skeleton wrapped in black rags". She watches each of the characters on the lookout for the slightest mistake so she can take them away. In the final chapter, when the island returns to being inhabited, she undergoes a profound transformation: she turns up in modern clothes, makes friends with the women in the town and bathes in the sea wearing a bikini.

== Reception ==
Literary critic Miriam Merchán describes the novel as "a text full of lyricism". Additionally, she referred positively to the use of magic realism and to the criticism that Yánez made of what she described as the "flaws of a civilized society", among which were counted ambition, religious fanaticism, greed and the feeling of needing to go to extremes. The writer Francisco Tobar García also praised the novel, asserting: "From the first chapter, maybe the finest of all, the writer takes us to that beyond, so difficult to be true poetry, moving poetry that weaves itself into the story. It is a strange, colossal, troubling book which many descriptions fit."

The professor Lady Rojas Benavente highlighted Yánez's criticism of the abuses of religious institutions, asserting that Hispanic words needed more authors that made them, and comparing Yánez with the writer Clorinda Matto de Turner.
