= Angelina Muñiz-Huberman =

Mexican writer and poet (born 1936)

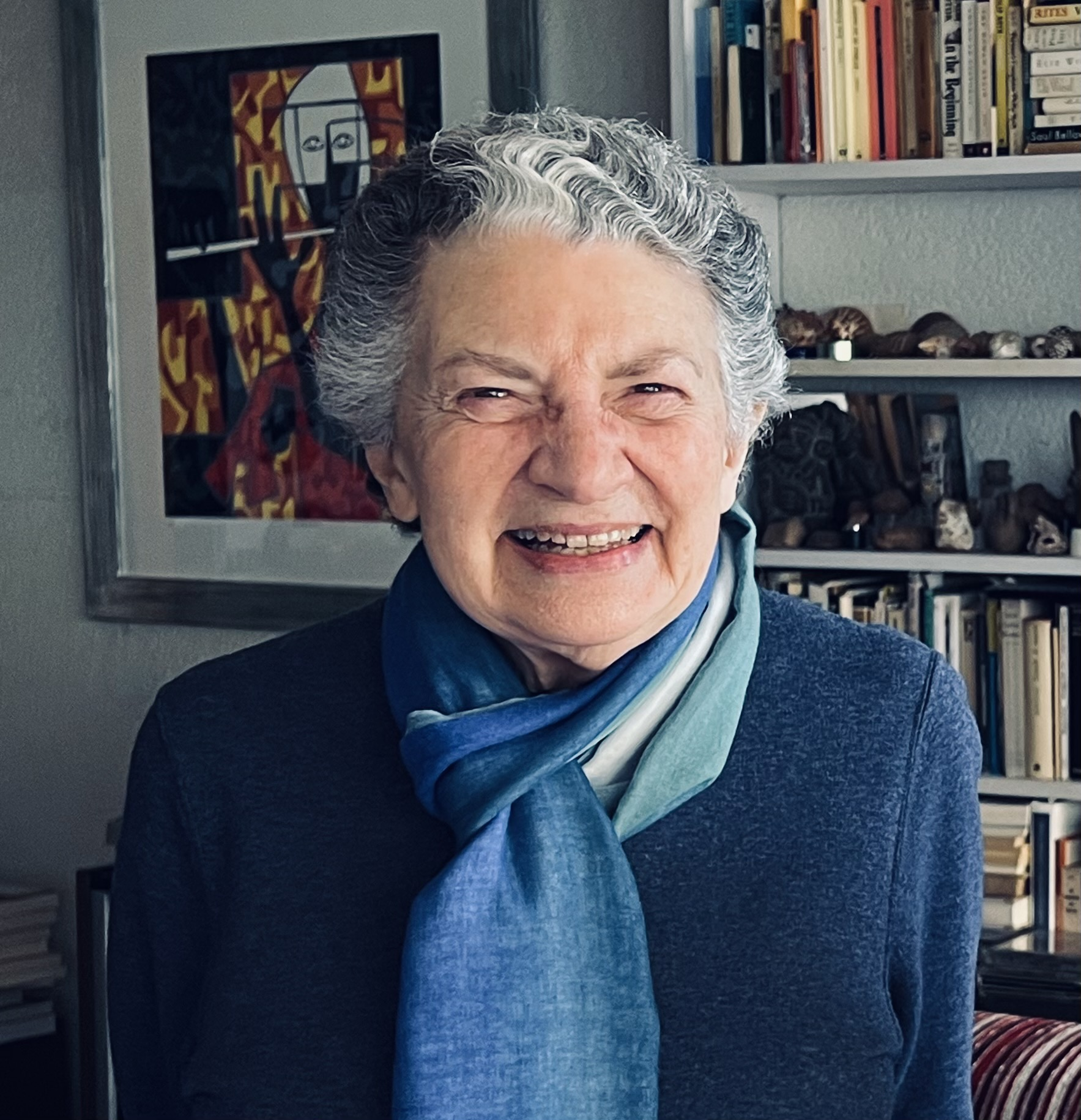
- Angelina Muñiz-Huberman
- Born: Angelina Muñiz Sacristán; December 29, 1936 (age 89); Hyères, France
- Citizenship: Mexican
- Occupation: Writer
- Spouse: Alberto Huberman
- Children: 2
- Writing career
- Language: Spanish; French; Hebrew
- Genres: Lyrics; prose; poetry; essay
- Subject: Sephardic mysticism
- Notable work: El siglo del desencanto (2002)
- Notable awards: Xavier Villaurrutia 1985; Sor Juana Inés de la Cruz 1993
- Website: www.academia.org.mx/academicos-2022/item/angelina-muniz-huberman-2?category_id=2382

Angelina Muñiz-Huberman (Spanish pronunciation: [aŋxeˈlina muˈɲis uˈβeɾman]; born December 29, 1936) is a Mexican writer, academic, poet and professor. She is known for her work and research on Ladino, crypto-Judaism, Jewish mysticism and Sephardic Jews. Muñiz-Huberman is a recipient of the Xavier Villaurrutia Award and the Sor Juana Inés de la Cruz Prize. In 2022, she received an honorary doctorate from the National Autonomous University of Mexico (UNAM) for a lifetime's work, an honor she shares with such figures as John Dewey, Octavio Paz and Juan Rulfo.

== Biography ==
She was born in Hyères in France to parents who had fled the Spanish Civil War. Her father was a Spanish journalist who wrote for the Heraldo de Madrid newspaper. As the Nazis started advancing into France in 1939, the Muñiz family fled to Cuba, where they briefly lived in the countryside until the family moved to Mexico City in 1942. Her father ran an outpost of a laboratory testing company owned by a family member residing in New York. Her mother changed her surname to sound more Christian, despite the fact that Sacristán was not a typically Jewish name. She converted to Judaism after discovering her Sephardic ancestry. Muñiz-Huberman grew up among other middle-class Jewish immigrants in the Condesa neighborhood. She studied Romance Languages at the University of Pennsylvania and New York University, and has a PhD in literature from the Universidad Nacional Autónoma de México (UNAM). She is a professor of medieval and comparative literature at the Universidad Nacional Autónoma de México.

In November 2021, Muñiz-Huberman was inducted into Mexico's most prestigious literary body, the Academia Mexicana de la Lengua (Mexican Academy of Language} following the death of the philosopher and historian Miguel León-Portilla. Her candidacy was proposed by academicians Ascensión Hernández Triviño, Javier Garciadiego, Roger Bartra and Silvia Molina.

She has been married to Alberto Huberman since 1959. Huberman was born in Cuba and migrated to Mexico after the Cuban revolution to complete his medical studies. He was a member of the socialist Zionist youth organization Hashomer Hatzair, and was among the founders of Kibbutz Ga'ash during his stay in Israel.

== Awards ==
She has been awarded the Xavier Villaurrutia Award (1985), for her short story collection Huerto cerrado, huerto sellado, the Sor Juana Inés de la Cruz Prize (1993), for her novel Dulcinea encantada, and the National Prize for Arts and Literature (2018), in the field of Linguistics and Literature. She also holds the José Fuentes Mares, Magda Donato, Woman of Valor Word, Manuel Levinsky, Protagonista de la Literatura Mexicana, the Orden Isabel la Católica, the Escuela Nacional de Altos Estudios de la Facultad de Filosofía y Letras recognition and the Arqueles Vela Medal, awarded by the Sociedad Mexicana de Geografía y Estadística (Mexican Society of Geography and Statistics). On January 14, 2021, she was awarded the 7th chair of the Academia Mexicana de la Lengua (The Mexican Academy of Language), a vacancy left by the death of the Mexican anthropologist, philosopher and historian Miguel León-Portilla. Muñiz-Huberman is also a corresponding member of the Academia Espírito-santense de Letras, Vitória, Espírito Santo, Brazil.

== Published works ==
=== Books ===
1. Morada interior (1972)
2. Tierra adentro (1977)
3. Vilano al viento (1982)
4. La guerra del Unicornio (1983)
5. Huerto Cerrado, Huerto Sellado (1985)
6. De magias y prodigios: transmutaciones (1987)
7. Notas de investigación sobre la literatura comparada (1989)
8. La lengua florida: antología sefardí (1989)
9. Primicias (1990)
10. El libro de Míriam (1990)
11. AM-H. De cuerpo entero (El juego de escribir) (1991)
12. Serpientes y escaleras (1991)
13. La lengua florida (1992)
14. El ojo de la creación (1992)
15. Narrativa relativa (1992)
16. Dulcinea encantada (1992)
17. Las raíces y las ramas: fuentes y derivaciones de la Cábala hispanohebrea (1993)
18. La memoria del aire (1995)
19. Castillos en la tierra (1995)
20. El trazo y el vuelo (1997)
21. The Confidantes (1997)
22. La sal en el rostro (1998)
23. El mercader de Tudela (1998)
24. El canto del peregrino (1999)
25. Conato de extranjería (1999)
26. El canto del peregrino. Hacia una poética del exilio (1999)
27. Trotsky en Coyoacán (2000)
28. Molinos sin viento (2001)
29. Areúsa en los conciertos (2002)
30. El siglo del desencanto (2002)
31. La tregua de la inocencia (2003)
32. Cantos treinta de otoño (2005)
33. La pausa figurada (2006)
34. La sombra que cobija (2007)
35. En el jardín de la Cábala (2008)
36. La burladora de Toledo (2008)
37. Las raíces y las ramas (2012)
38. Rompeolas. Poesía reunida (2012)
39. Las vueltas a la noria (2013)
40. El sefardí romántico (2014)
41. Hacia Malinalco (2014)
42. Arritmias (2015)
43. Cosas veredes (2016)
44. Los esperandos. Piratas judeo-portugueses... y yo (2017)
45. El atanor encendido. Antología de cábala, alquimia, gnosticismo (2019)
46. El último faro (2020)
47. Cartas a una ardilla y otros especímenes (Renacimiento, 2022: ISBN 978-84-19617-79-8)

=== Translations ===
- Enclosed Garden (Latin American Literary Review Press,1988. Trad. Lois Parkinson Zamora), short fiction
- Dulcinée (UNESCO,1995), novel
- A Mystical Journey (Gaon Books, 2011. Trad. Seymour Menton)
- Dreaming of Safed (Gaon Books, 2014, Trad. Seymour Menton), YA novel
- Enchanted Dulcinea (Rowman & Littlefield, March 2022. Trad. Rebecca Marquis), novel
- Arrhythmias (Hablemos, ecritoras & Literal Publishing, 2022. Trad. D. P. Snyder), essay/short fiction

=== Editor ===
- Revised edition with an introduction and notes of León Dujovne's Spanish translation of Maimonides' The Guide for the Perplexed (Guía de los perplejos, based on the French version of Salomon Munk). Three volumes. Mexico City: Conaculta, 2001.
