= Armando González =

Armando González can refer to:

- Armando González Soto (1925–2007), Mexican politician, municipal president of Juárez, Chihuahua, in 1965–1968
- Armando González (rowing) (1931–2022), Spanish Olympic rowing coxswain
- Armando González (athlete) (born 1940), Uruguayan long-distance runner
- Armando González (Paraguayan footballer) (fl. 1950), Paraguayan football midfielder
- Armando González Torres (born 1964), Mexican poet and essayist
- Armando González Escoto (born 1967), Mexican politician, elected for Mexico City's 2nd district in 2018
- Armando González (footballer, born 1968), Mexican football manager and former forward
- Armando González (footballer, born 1997), Mexican football winger for Oaxaca
- Armando González (footballer, born 2003), Mexican football forward
