= Dujovne =

Dujovne is a surname. Notable people with the surname include:

- León Dujovne (1898–1984), Argentine writer
- Nicolás Dujovne (born 1967), Argentine economist
- Alicia Dujovne Ortiz (born 1940), Argentine journalist
