= Ana García =

Ana García may refer to:

- Ana García Armada, Spanish electrical engineer and academic
- Ana García Bergua (born 1960), Mexican writer
- Ana García Blaya (born 1979), Argentine film director
- Ana García Carías (born 1968), Honduran lawyer, First Lady of Honduras from 2014 to 2022
- Ana García D'Atri (born 1967), Spanish editor, journalist and politician
- Ana García Lozano (born 1963), Spanish journalist and TV presenter
- Ana García Perrote, Spanish singer and guitarist
- Ana García-Arcicollar (born 1982), Spanish teacher and Paralympic swimmer
- Ana García-Siñeriz (born 1965), Spanish TV presenter
- Ana García (footballer) (born 1994), Mexican footballer
