= Alicia Yánez Cossío =

Ecuadorian poet, novelist and journalist

Alicia Yáñez Cossío
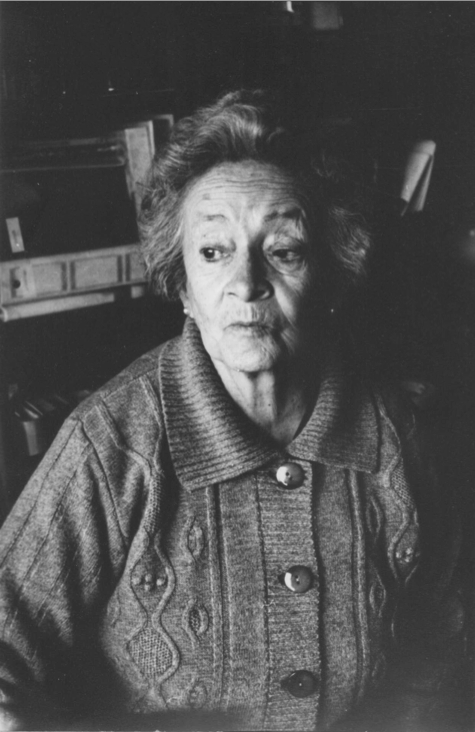
- Born: December 10, 1928 (age 97); Quito, Ecuador
- Occupations: Writer, poet, journalist
- Writing career
- Language: Spanish
- Notable awards: Premio Eugenio Espejo (2008), Sor Juana Inés de la Cruz Prize (1996)

Alicia Yáñez Cossío (born December 10, 1928, in Quito ) is a prominent Ecuadorian poet, novelist and journalist.

Yáñez Cossio is one of the leading figures in Ecuadorian literature and in Latin America, and she is the first Ecuadorian to win the Premio Sor Juana Inés de la Cruz, which she received in 1996.

In 2008 she received Ecuador's highest literary prize, the "Premio Eugenio Espejo" for her lifetime of work.

== Biography ==
Daughter of Ing.el Alfonso Yánez Proaño and Clemencia Cossío Larrea. When she was six years old she entered the Sagrados Corazones School of Quito, where she stayed for a while due to academic failings stemming from a dislike of arithmetic. However, since she was young, Cossío she always desired to be a writer because of her great talent with words.^{3}

Yáñez Cossío would later say: “I had an extremely happy childhood, maybe a bit boyish, influenced by the first books I read: the works of Julio Verne and Tarzan’s feats. I never liked dolls.”^{4}

Her characters frequently represent the community that fights to rescue woman's elementary rights. Male chauvinism is a recurring theme in her writing. Irony, sarcasm and hyperbole make evident twisted masculine superiority, where she critiques social concepts, such as virginity, homosexuality, etc.

She has other unprecedented novels with similar characteristics. One of them is "El Cristo Feo" ("The Ugly Christ").

In 1993, she became a widow. She is a woman whose fame has expanded beyond the borders of her homeland.

In 1996, she received the Premio Sor Juana Inés de la Cruz for the best Latin American novel written by a woman.^{5}

In 1998, she edited "Retratos cubanos" ("Cuban Portraits") with 18 stories written between 1957 and 1961 from Cuba. They mainly discussed man's battle to attain freedom. When the original authors left the island, the stories were confiscated, later to be re-written in 1996, mixing history with crude realism.

She is the mother of writer Luis Miguel Campos Yáñez.

== Works ==
=== Novels ===
- Bruna, soroche y los tíos (1973). Bruna and Her Sisters in the Sleeping City, trans. Kenneth J. A. Wishina (Northwestern University Press, 1999)
- Yo vendo unos ojos negros (1979)
- Más allá de las islas (1980). Beyond the Islands, trans. Amalia Gladhart (UNO Press, 2011)
- La Cofradía del Mullo de la virgen Pipona (1985). The Potbellied Virgin, trans. Amalia Gladhart (University of Texas Press, 2006)
- La casa del sano placer (1989)
- El cristo feo (1995)
- Aprendiendo a morir (1997)
- Y amarle pude... (2000)
- Sé que vienen a matarme (2001)
- Concierto de sombras (2004)
- Esclavos de Chatham (2006)
- Memorias de la Pivihuarmi Cuxirimay Ocllo (2008)

=== Poetry ===
- Luciolas (1949)
- De la sangre y el tiempo (1964)
- Plebeya mínima (1974)

=== Short stories ===
- El beso y otras fricciones (1975)
- Relatos cubanos (1998)

=== Theater ===
- Hacia el Quito de ayer (1951)

=== Children's literature ===
- El viaje de la abuela (1997)
- Pocapena (1997)
- Los triquitraques (2002)
- ¡No más! (2004)
- La canoa de la abuela (2006)

== Awards ==
- National Novel Contest – Fiftieth Anniversary of the journal "El Universo" of Guayaquil (1971)
- Sor Juana Inés de la Cruz Prize (1996)
- Eugenio Espejo Prize in Literature (2008)

== The Alicia Yáñez Cossío Children's Literature Competition ==
In 2002, she was honored by the Government of the Province of Pichincha and its Provincial Patronage by the institution of a children's literature contest that bears her name. This contest aims to stimulate all the districts of Pichincha's provinces to contribute to the creation of spaces for expression, research and strengthening of cultural identity.
