= Daniela Tarazona =

Mexican writer

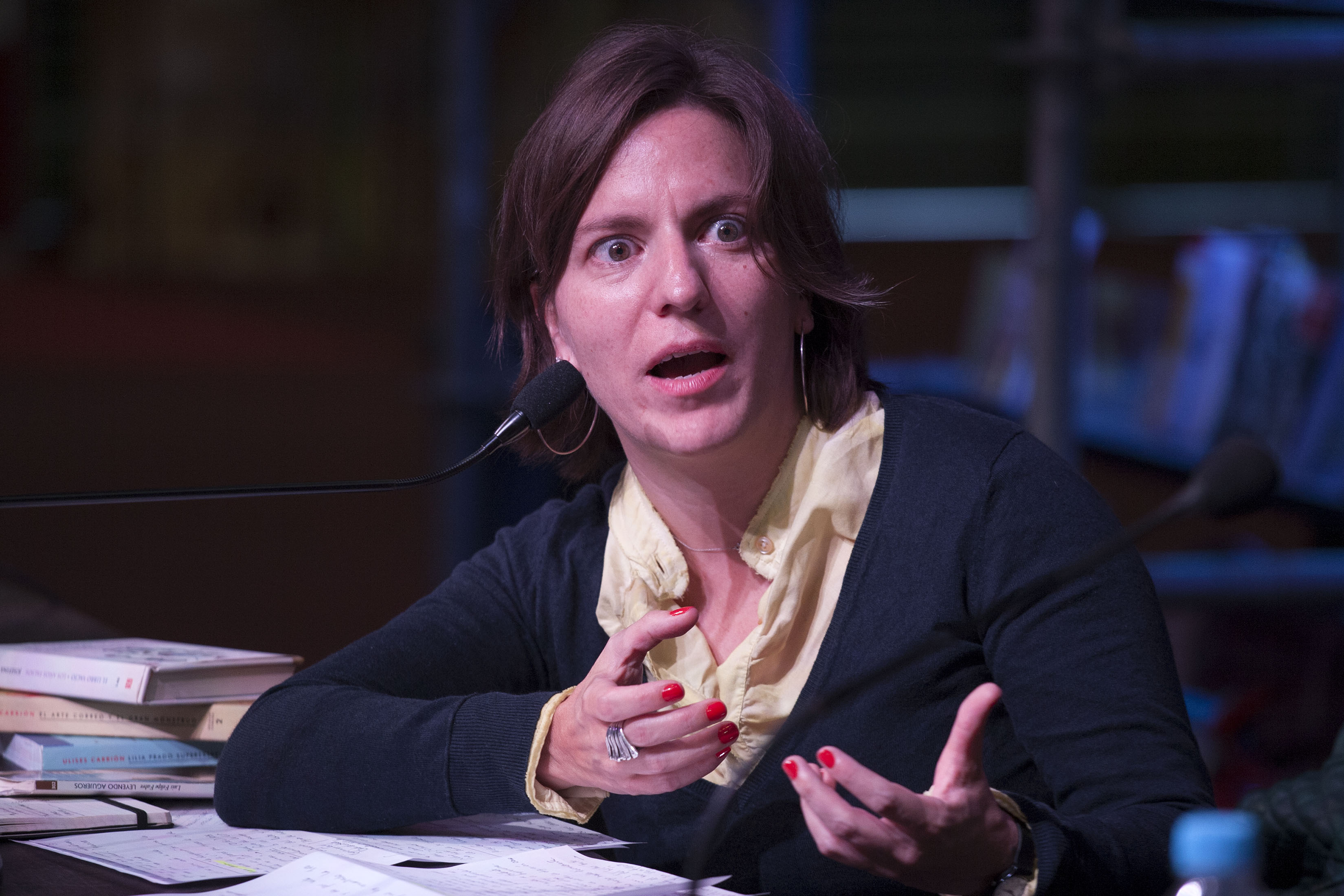
- Born: 1975 (age 50–51); Mexico City, Mexico
- Occupation: Writer
- Writing career
- Notable awards: Sor Juana Inés de la Cruz Prize (2022)

Daniela Tarazona (born 1975) is a Mexican writer and journalist. She is the winner of the 2022 Sor Juana Inés de la Cruz Prize.

== Early life and education ==
Daniela Tarazona was born on 23 June 1975, in Mexico City, Mexico. She studied Latin American literature at the Universidad Iberoamericana, where she wrote her thesis on Clarice Lispector's The Hour of the Star, then continued her education at the University of Salamanca.

== Career ==
Tarazona published her first text when she was 26, in a supplement of the Excélsior. She worked as editor-in-chief for the Hoja por hoja literary supplement of the Reforma. She has also worked for such magazines as Letras Libres, Luvina, Crítica y Renacimiento, as well as weekly supplements of Milenio and Reforma.

In 2006, she gained a Young Creators grant from FONCA, which helped her write her first novel, El animal sobre la piedra (2008). In 2011, she was included in a list of "The 25 Best Kept Secrets in Latin America" at the Guadalajara International Book Fair. Her second novel, El beso de la liebre (2013) was shortlisted for the Casa de las Américas Prize. In 2022, her novel Isla partida won the Sor Juana Inés de la Cruz Prize.

Her works have been translated into Italian, English, French and Czech.

== Works ==
=== Novels ===
- El animal sobre la piedra, 2008. Translated by Lizzie Davis and Kevin Gerry Dunn as The Animal on the Rock (Dallas: Deep Vellum, 2025)
- El beso de la liebre, 2013
- Isla partida, 2021

=== Essays ===
- Clarice Lispector, 2009
- Clarice Lispector. La mirada en el jardín, 2020
