= Paloma Villegas =

Mexican writer

Paloma Villegas (born 1951) is a Mexican writer and translator and winner of the prestigious Sor Juana Inés de la Cruz Prize for her 2004 novel, Agosto y fuga (August Escape). She has translated over 20 books into Spanish.

== Biography ==
Paloma Villegas was born in Mexico City in 1951. She studied Spanish language and literature at the Faculty of Philosophy and Letters of the National Autonomous University of Mexico, and worked as a professor at the Autonomous Metropolitan University. She on the editorial board of Cuadernos Político, and has been a member of Ediciones Era since 1988. She has been a literary critic for various magazines and cultural supplements. She won the 2005 Sor Juana Inés de la Cruz Prize for Agosto y fuga. She has translated numerous books in Mexico and Spain.

== Bibliography ==
- Mapas (1981), ISBN 9789684110533, a book of poetry
- La luz oblicua (1995), ISBN 9789684113695
- Agosto y fuga (2004), ISBN 9789508510914
