= Fernanda Trías =

Uruguayan writer (born 1976)

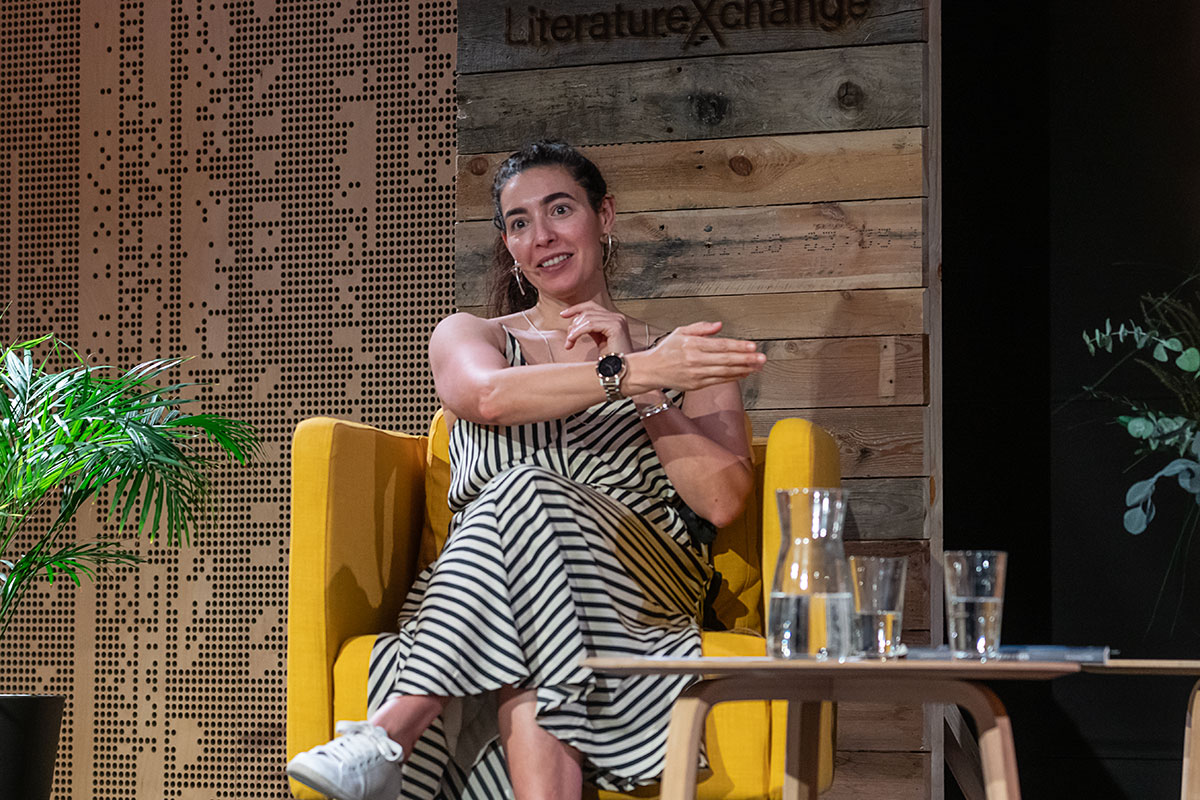
- LiteratureXchange Festival Aarhus (Denmark 2023); Photo Hreinn Gudlaugsson
- Born: 1976 (age 49–50); Montevideo, Uruguay
- Occupations: Writer, translator
- Awards: Premio Bartolomé Hidalgo; Sor Juana Inés de la Cruz Prize

Fernanda Trías (born in 1976) is a Uruguayan author and translator.

Her novels include ‘’La Azotea’’ (The Rooftop), ‘’La ciudad invencible’’ (The Invincible City), and ‘’Mugre rosa’’ (Pink Slime), ‘’El monte de las furias’’ (The Hill of Wrath) as well as the short story collection ‘’No soñarás Flores’’ and the chapbook ‘’El regreso’’.

Her work has also been included in anthologies in Germany, Colombia, Peru, Spain, Uruguay, the US, and the UK, including 20/40 and Palabras Errantes. Her work has been translated into seventeen languages, including English, French, German, Italian, Portuguese, Danish, Swedish, Greek, Arabic, Polish, among others. La azotea was selected as one of the best books of the year by El País Cultural and was awarded the third prize of the National Uruguayan Literature in 2002. In 2006, she received the BankBoston Foundation Prize for National Culture. She was a friend and student of the Uruguayan writer Mario Levrero and participated in the creation of De los flexes terpines, a collection directed by Levrero that published fifteen titles, almost all by new writers. In the fifth volume of that collection, Trías published her first novella, Cuaderno para solo un ojo.

In 2004, she won the Unesco-Aschberg scholarship for writers and went to France, where she lived for five years. In 2010, She moved to Buenos Aires, where she worked as a translator, reader, and copyeditor for multiple publishing houses. In 2012, she won a scholarship to pursue an MFA in creative writing at New York University. In 2017, she won the Eñe-Casa de Velázquez Prize and residency in Madrid for her project Mugre rosa. She lives in Bogotá, Colombia, where she has taught at the Universidad Nacional's creative writing MFA. In 2019, she was selected for the writer-in-residence program at the University of the Andes, where she currently lives and writes.

In 2020 she was awarded the Uruguay national literature prize for Mugre rosa, followed in 2021 by the Premio Bartolomé Hidalgo and the Sor Juana Inés de la Cruz Prize. In 2024, the English translation by Heather Cleary was longlisted for the National Book Award for Translated Literature. Both The Rooftop and Pink Slime were awarded a British PEN Translates Award (2020 and 2023). In 2024 she was a finalist of the Short Story Prize Ribera del Duero (Spain) with her short-story collection "Una mujer de su época". In 2025 she was awarded the Sor Juana Inés de la Cruz Prize a second time, for El monte de las furias.

== Works ==
=== Novel ===
- 2001: La azotea (The Rooftop). Trilce, Hum Uruguay, Penguin Random House
- 2002: Cuaderno para un solo ojo
- 2014: La ciudad invencible. Hum Uruguay, Marciana Argentina, Dharma Books México, Banda Propia Chile, Laguna Colombia
- 2020: Mugre rosa (Pink Slime). Scribner, Penguin Random House
- 2025: El monte de las furias (The Hill of Wrath). Penguin Random House

=== Short stories ===
- 2012: El regreso
- 2016: No soñarás flores (You Will Not Dream of Flowers). Hum Uruguay, Penguin Random House, Tránsito España
