= Inés Fernández Moreno =

Argentine novelist (1947–2024)

- Born: 1947; Buenos Aires, Argentina
- Died: 10 November 2024 (aged 77)
- Education: Literature
- Occupation: Novelist
- Writing career
- Notable awards: Sor Juana Inés de la Cruz Prize (2014)

Inés Fernández Moreno (1947 – 10 November 2024) was an Argentine novelist who published several stories and novels. She was awarded the Sor Juana Inés de la Cruz Prize in 2014.

== Early life ==
After studying in Spain and France with a scholarship, she graduated in Literature from the University of Buenos Aires (UBA). In addition, she is the granddaughter of the poet Baldomero Fernández Moreno and the daughter of the novelist César Fernández Moreno. She started writing at the age of 35.

== Professional career ==
Fernández Moreno graduated in Literature from the University of Buenos Aires (UBA). This allowed her to order the anarchy of her readings that went from Corin Tellado to Dostoyevsky. Years before, she studied in France and Spain with a scholarship, where she resided between 2002 and 2005.

She worked as a journalist in Spain and in the advertising sector. She worked in various places and organised literary workshops.

== Literary work and prizes ==
In 1991, Fernández Moreno was a finalist in the ‘Juan Rulfo’ Prize with her story ‘Dios lo bendiga’. The next year, in 1992, she was the winner of the ‘La Felguera’ Prize in Asturias, Spain with her story ‘Madre para armar’. In 1993, she came in second place for the 'Premio Municipal de la Ciudad de Buenos Aires' with her story ‘La vida en la cornisa’. A few years later, in 1996, she came in second place again, this time for the ‘Premio Ediciones. Desde la Gente’ with her story ‘Todo lo que no he perdido’. A year later, in 1997, she won the ‘Premio Municipal de la Ciudad de Buenos Aires’, this time she came first with her novel ‘Un amor de agua’. In 1999, she wrote the only one of her pieces of work that has been translated into Italian, ‘La última vez que maté a mi madre’. With this novel she came first again in the ‘Premio Municipal de la Ciudad de Buenos Aires’, and also the ‘Letras de Oro 2000 de Honorarte’ Prize. In 2003, she wrote ‘Hombres como médanos’, and she also won the ‘Max Aub’ Prize in Spain with her story ‘En extinción’. Likewise, in 2005, she wrote ‘La profesora de español’ a novel based on her experience living in Marbella, Spain from 2002 to 2005. Two years later, in 2007, she won the ‘Hucha de Oro’ Prize awarded by FUNCAS, also in Spain, with the novel ‘Carne de exportación’. In 2009 and 2013, she wrote her two last novels: ‘El cielo no existe’ and ‘Mármara’.

== Work style ==
The stories of Fernández Moreno had a humorous tone and some intimate Costumbrismo. According to the critic Julio Ortega "Her stories have an immediate transparency: they discuss the world and human relations with the lightness recommended by Calvin.

== Death ==
Fernández Moreno died on 10 November 2024, at the age of 77.
