= Asociación de los Escritores en Lenguas Indígenas =

Mexican arts organization

The Asociación de los Escritores en Lenguas Indígenas is a Mexican arts organization centered on writers in indigenous languages.

It was founded by Natalio Hernández.
