= Fernando Serrano Migallón =

Mexican jurist (1945–2026)

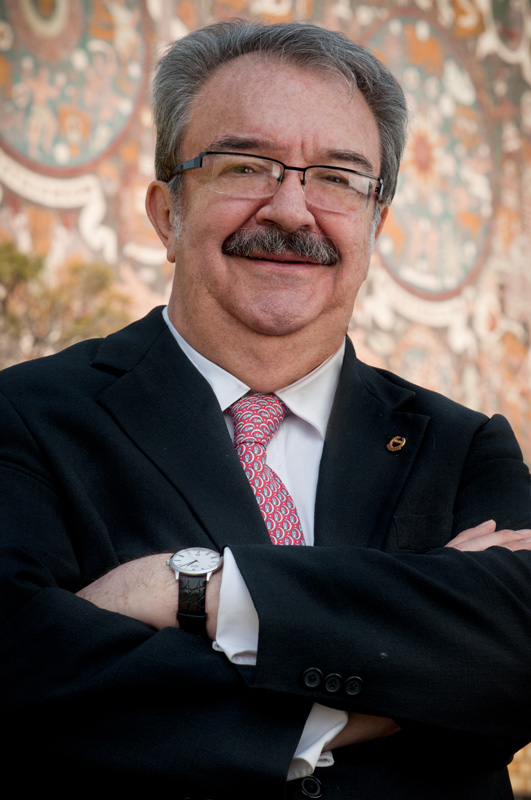
Serrano Migallón in 2011

Fernando Alberto Lázaro Serrano Migallón (Note: In this Mexican name, the surname is Serrano and the second or maternal family name is Migallón.) (26 June 1945 – 27 October 2026) was a Mexican jurist. He was a professor at the National Autonomous University of Mexico (UNAM) for over 40 years, held positions in the federal administration and was a member of the Mexican Academy of Language.

== Life and career ==
Fernando Serrano Migallón was born in Mexico City on 26 June 1945 into a family of Spanish Republican exiles. He graduated in law and economics at the National Autonomous University of Mexico and later earned a doctorate in history from the same institution. He also studied at the Institut international d'administration publique in Paris and at The Hague Academy of International Law. He later taught at the UNAM for more than four decades.

In 1995, during the presidency of Ernesto Zedillo, he was appointed director-general of copyright at the federal Secretariat of Public Education (SEP), where he helped draft the 1996 Federal Copyright Law. He also participated in the administrative reorganisation that led to the creation of the National Copyright Institute (INDAUTOR), of which he served as the first director-general.

He served twice as the legal counsel of the UNAM (1993–1995 and in 2000) and headed its Faculty of Law from 2000 to 2008, when he played a key role in its modernisation and recovery in the aftermath of the 1999 students' strike. In 2003, he was mentioned as possible candidate to serve as rector of the UNAM.

Between 2009 and 2011 he was cultural and artistic secretary at the National Council for Culture and the Arts (CONACULTA) and, from 2012 to 2014, he served as undersecretary of higher education at the Secretariat of Public Education. He also served on the boards of El Colegio de México (Colmex), the Centre for Economic Research and Teaching (CIDE) and the National Human Rights Commission (CNDH).

Serrano Migallón died on 27 October 2026, at the age of 81.

== Published works ==
Serrano Migallón published over 50 books, including the ten-volume La vida constitucional de México, examining the history of the country's legal system, and Historia mínima de las constituciones en México, reviewing the various constitutions adopted prior to the 1917 Constitution and the amendments made to the current document. Several of his works (La inteligencia peregrina, El asilo político en México and …Duras las tierras ajenas… Un asilo, tres exilios) examined the situation of the exiled Spanish Republican community. Other books explored the lives and works of the diplomat Isidro Fabela, the jurist Ignacio Burgoa Orihuela and the constitutionalist Felipe Tena Ramírez. His memoirs, Hurgar en el corazón, were published in 2026.

He also published articles in various magazines and newspapers, including El Universal and Excélsior.

== Memberships and accolades ==
- 2006: Elected to the Mexican Academy of Language
- 2012: Correspondent member of the Mexican Academy of History
- 2021: National Prize for Arts and Sciences in history, social sciences and philosophy
- 2026: Named professor emeritus by the UNAM
