= Fernando Nava López =

Mexican linguist and anthropologist (born 1959)

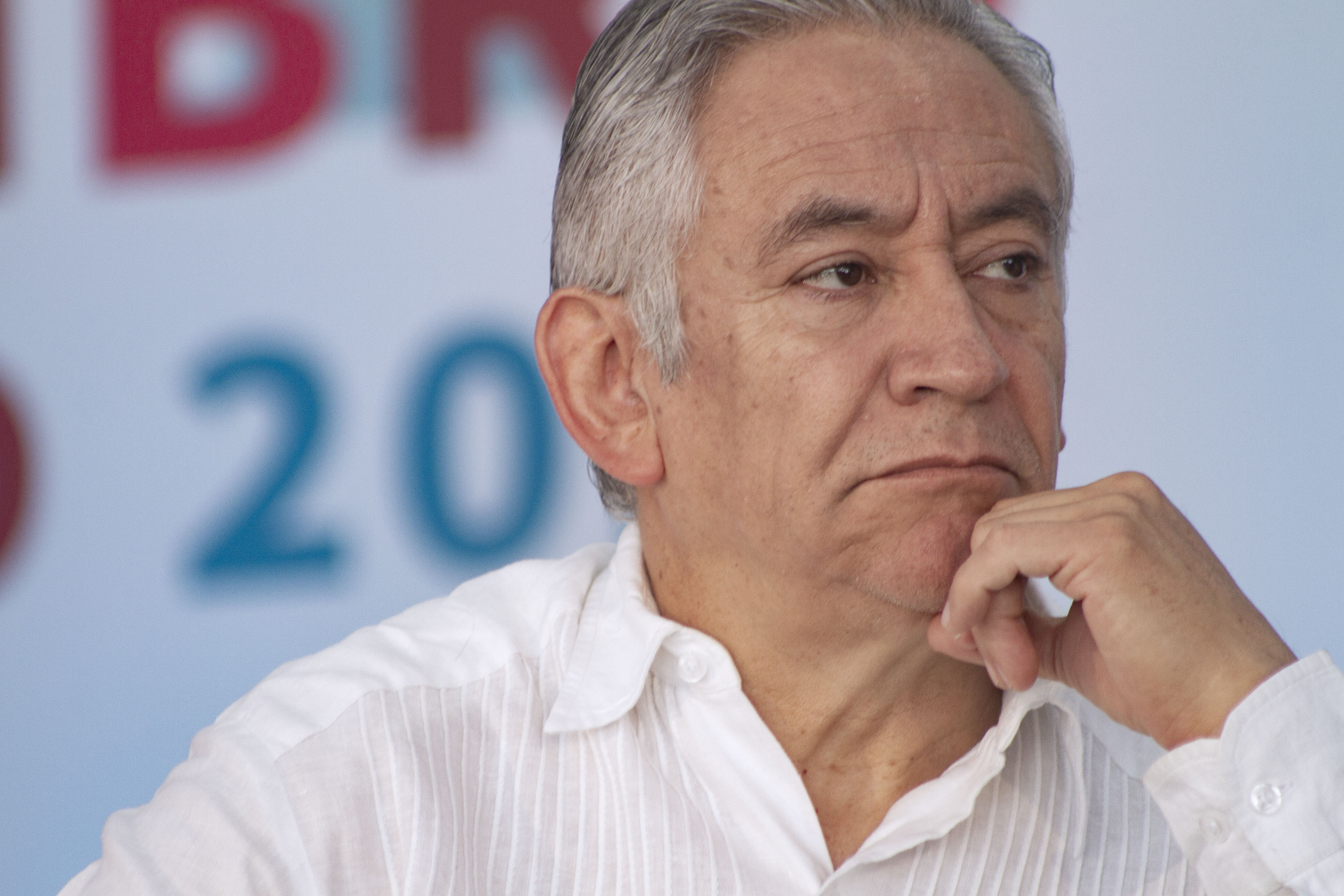
Fernando Nava López in 2019

Enrique Fernando Nava López (Note: In this Mexican name, the surname is Nava and the second or maternal family name is López.) (born 30 May 1959) is a Mexican anthropologist and linguist specialising in Purépecha (Tarascan) and other indigenous languages of Mexico. He was the first director-general of the National Institute of Indigenous Languages (INALI) from 2004 to 2010 and has been a member of the Mexican Academy of Language since 2017.

== Life and work ==
Fernando Nava López was born in León, Guanajuato, on 30 May 1959. He earned a bachelor's degree in linguistics from the National School of Anthropology and History (ENAH) in Mexico City and a master's from the National Autonomous University of Mexico (UNAM) and El Colegio de México. In 2004 he received a doctorate in anthropology from the ENAH and the UNAM. He also studied music at the National Conservatory and at the UNAM's National School of Music before switching to linguistics and anthropology.

He has taught at the National School of Folkloric Dance of the National Institute of Fine Arts (INBA), the National School of Music, the Centre for Social Anthropology Research and Higher Studies (CIESAS), and the Las Rosas Conservatory in Morelia, Michoacán. He has also conducted research at the UNAM's Anthropological Research Institute, the INBA's National Centre for Musical Research, Documentation and Information, and the Colegio de México's Centre for Linguistic and Literary Studies.

His research interests include the Purépecha, Nahuatl and Isthmus Zapotec languages; traditional Mexican music, including indigenous language song; popular traditions; the music of dance relating to the Spanish Conquest; and the musicalisation of improvised oral poetry. In 2000, he and Guadalupe Hernández Dimas published Jánhaskapani juchar anapu jimpo, the first grammar of Purépecha written in that language.

In 2004, the administration of President Vicente Fox appointed him to serve as first director-general of the National Institute of Indigenous Languages (INALI), where he remained until 2010. During his time at the INALI, he oversaw the development of new programmes for cataloguing Mexico's indigenous languages and for training translators and interpreters in those languages for work in the health, justice and social welfare sectors.

In 2017 he was elected to the Mexican Academy of Language (AML), to replace Leopoldo Valiñas Coalla in Seat XXIII. The members of the academy cited his "linguistic knowledge and literary merit" as reasons for his admission. In his inaugural address, Nava said that his work within the AML would focus on the country's indigenous languages and raising sociolinguistic awareness about their current status.
