= Marina Perezagua =

Spanish novelist

- Born: 1978 (age 47–48); Seville, Spain
- Writing career
- Notable awards: Sor Juana Inés de la Cruz Prize (2016)

Marina Perezagua is a novelist and writer in Spanish.

== Life ==
Perezagua was born in Seville, Spain. She graduated in Art History from the University of Seville and the Universitá Degli Studi di Padova. She obtained her PhD in philology in the United States and later on she became a professor of language, literature, history and Latin American cinema at the State University of New York at Stony Brook. Afterwards she worked for two years at the Instituto Cervantes de Lyon. She has three masters degrees and one doctorate.

She enjoys open swimming and she has completed the 14 mile crossing of the Straits of Gibraltar.

Perezagua lives in New York and works as Distinguished Professor in Residence at New York University. Her 2013 collection of stories, Leche, was illustrated by a water colour by the painter Walton Ford. She is a recipient of the Sor Juana Inés de la Cruz Prize and her work has been translated into eleven languages. She is a frequent columnist for El País.

The English translation of her 2018 book "The Story of H" was recommended by Vanity Fair and Forges.

== Published books ==
- Criaturas Abisales (Los Libros del Lince, 2011)
- Leche (Los libros del Lince, 2013)
- Yoro (Los libros del Lince, 2015)
- Don Quijote de Manhattan (Malpaso, 2016)
- Story of H (2018)
- Seis formas de morir en Texas (Anagrama, 2019)
- Nana de la Medusa (Espasa, March 2023)
- A - 122 metros, coauthor with Miguel Lozano (Planeta, September 2023)
- El Sabor de mi madre (Pre-Textos, April 2024)

== Awards ==
- 2016: Sor Juana Inés de la Cruz Prize ($10,000 USD)
- 2023: Hamman Al Ándalus Award (€4000)
- Pre-Textos Award ($27000)
