= Natalio Hernández =

Mexican poet

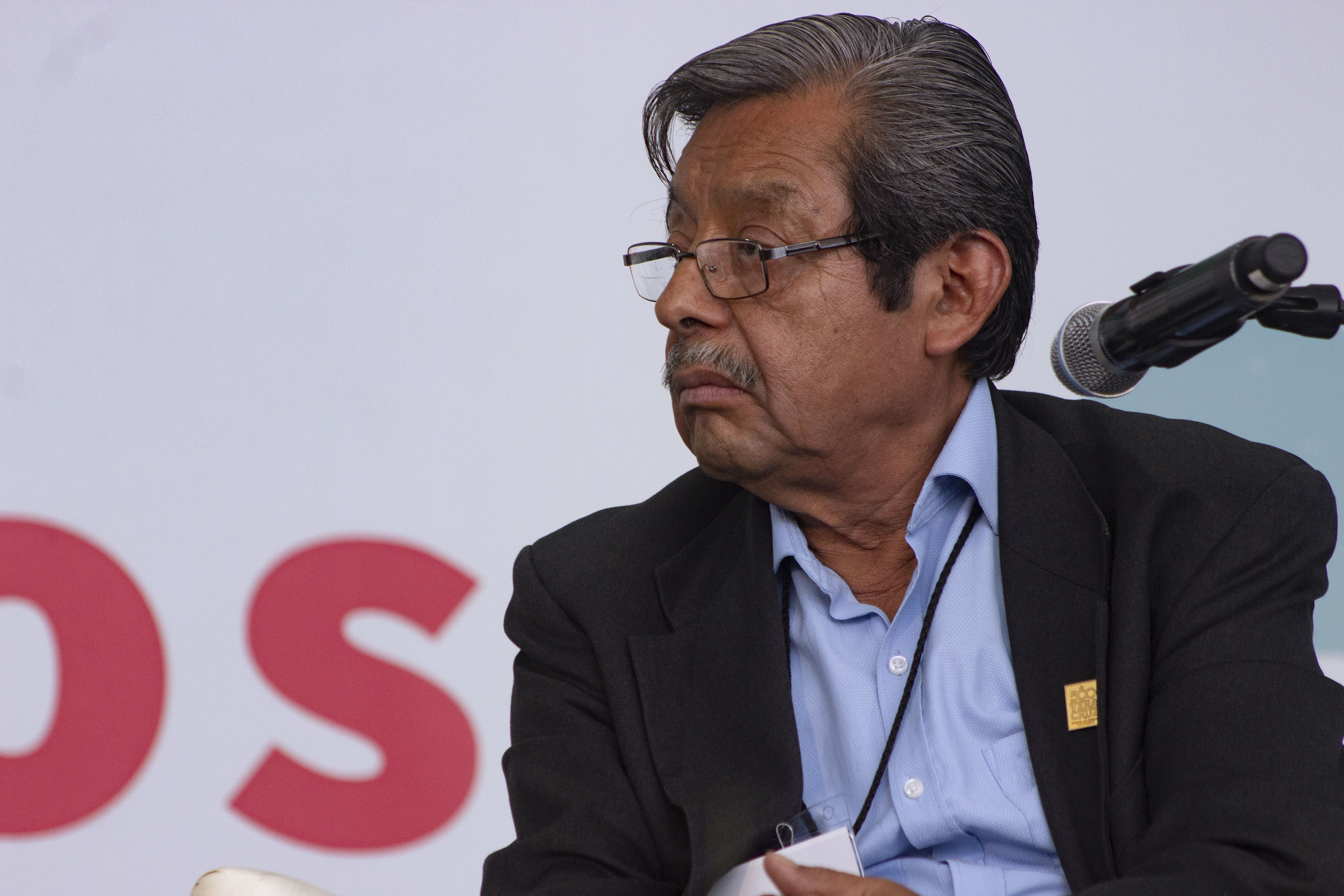
Natalio Hernández in 2019.

Natalio Hernández Hernández (born 27 July 1947), also known as Natalio Hernández Xocoyotzin and by the pseudonym José Antonio Xokoyotsij, is a Mexican Nahua intellectual and poet, from Lomas del Dorado, Ixhuatlán de Madero in the state of Veracruz. He is a founder of the Asociación de los Escritores en Lenguas Indígenas (AELI, Association of Writers in Indigenous Languages), the Casa de los Escritores en Lenguas Indígenas (CELI, House of Writers in Indigenous Languages), and the Alianza Nacional de Profesionales Indígenas Bilingües (or ANPIBAC, National Alliance of Indigenous Bilingual Professionals). Since 2013 he is a corresponding member of the Academia Mexicana de la Lengua, the Mexican Language Academy.

Hernández was born 1947 in Naranjo Dulce, a small settlement in the municipality of Ixhuatlán de Madero, Veracruz.

== Works ==
- Xochikoskatl (1985; ISBN 968-6031-02-2)
- Sempoalxóchitl / Veinte flores: una sola flor (1987; ISBN 968-36-0061-1)
- Ijkon ontlajtoj aueuetl / Así habló el ahuehuete (1989; ISBN 968-834-183-5)
- Canto nuevo de Anahuac (1994; ISBN 968-13-2730-6)
- Papalocuicatl / Canto a las mariposas (1996; ISBN 968-7646-08-X)
- in tlahtoli, in ohtli / la palabra, el camino: Memoria y destino de los pueblos indígenas (1998; ISBN 968-856-580-6)
- El despertar de nuestras lenguas: Queman tlachixque totlahtolhuan (2002; ISBN 968-13-3540-6)
- Semanca huitzilin / Colibrí de la armonía / Hummingbird of Harmony (2005; ISBN 970-35-0862-6)
