= Ana Gloria Moya =

Argentine novelist (1954–2013)

Ana Gloria Moya (1954 – 7 October 2013) was an Argentine novelist who has achieved national and international recognition.

Her novel Cielo de tambores (Heaven of Drums) won the international Sor Juana Inés de la Cruz Prize in 2002. It is a historical novel based on the life of Manuel Belgrano with two characters from the margins of society.

Born in Tucuman, Moya worked as a lawyer in the northwestern province of Salta.

== Books ==
- Sangre tan caliente - y otras pasiones (1997)
- La desmemoria (1999) Salta: Ediciones del Robledal, ISBN 987-9364-11-2
- Cielo de tambores (2002) - tr. Nick Hill, Sky of Drums, Curbstone Press (paperback 2006), ISBN 1-931896-25-9
- Semillas de papaya a la luz de la luna. 2008. Emecé editorial. ISBN 9500431017
