= Blasko =

Blasko is both a given name and a surname. Notable people with the name include:

- Blaško Rajić (1878–1951), Croat priest, writer, and politician
- Milan Blaško (1961–2016), Slovak ski mountaineer
- Sarah Blasko (born 1976), Australian musician
- Bela Lugosi, born Béla Ferenc Dezső Blaskó

== See also ==
- Blasco
- Rob Nicholson (musician) (born 1969), nicknamed "Blasko"
