= Celorio (surname) =

Celorio is a surname. Notable people with the surname include:

- Gonzalo Celorio (born 1948), Mexican writer and academic
- Víctor Celorio (born 1957), Mexican writer, businessman, and inventor
