= Maria Gainza =

Argentine art critic and writer

Maria Gainza (born December 25, 1975, Buenos Aires) is an Argentine art critic and writer.

She is a granddaughter of Alberto Gainza Paz, who was director of the newspaper La Prensa.

She began publishing her first articles about art for newspapers and cultural supplements in 2003.She has been a regular contributor to Artforum magazine for more than ten years. She also wrote in the Radar supplement of the newspaper Página/12. She has taught courses for artists at the Center for Artistic Research and art criticism workshops at Torcuato di Tella University. In 2017, she won the Konex Award in the Visual Arts category.

She was co-editor of the collection on Argentine art "Los Sentidos", by Adriana Hidalgo Editora.

Optic Nerve (Spanish: El nervio óptico, published in 2014 by Editorial Mansalva), her first foray into narrative, has been translated into ten languages.

In 2018, she published The Black Light (Spanish: La luz negra, published by Editorial Anagrama), a detective novel that deals with the art market and forgery through the lives of four women. In 2019 she was awarded the Sor Juana Inés de la Cruz Prize for the novel.

== Literary works ==
=== Novels ===
- Optic Nerve (Catapult Press, 2022, trans. by Thomas Bunstead)
- Portrait of An Unknown Lady (Catapult Press, 2022, trans. by Thomas Bunstead)

=== Poetry ===
- Un imperio por otro (Editorial Mansalva, 2021)

=== Essays ===
- Textos elegidos 2003-2010 (Capital Intelectual, 2011)
- Una vida crítica (Clave Intelectual, 2020)
