= El cristo feo =

Ecuadorian novel by Alicia Yánez Cossío

El Cristo Feo
- Author: Alicia Yánez Cossío
- Language: Spanish
- Published: 1995
- Publication place: Ecuador
- Awards: Joaquín Gallegos Lara National Fiction Prize

El Cristo Feo is a 1995 novel by Ecuadorian poet and novelist Alicia Yánez Cossío.

The novel won the Joaquín Gallegos Lara Prize as the best Ecuadorian novel of the year and the Indigo Coté Femmes de París Prize. According to Yánez, the protagonist of the novel is a projection of herself.

== Plot ==
Ordalisa is a domestic worker who lives in a small and modest room without windows. One morning she starts to hear a voice calling her name. After searching all over the room for the source of the voice, she discovers that it is coming from an old and ugly crucifix made of wood. Ordalisa finds herself puzzled by the incident, without knowing if the voice is real or a product of the loneliness, she feels from living alone and not counting on family.

Ordalisa's employers ask her to move with them to one of the empty rooms in the house and she gladly accepts. In the following days, the ugly crucifix starts to motivate Ordalisa to be more assertive, to not be ashamed of expressing her desires, and to get ready better. One day she sees her boss arranging his collection of stamps and asks him if he gets bored doing the same things every day. He ponders the question and realizes that until then he had never thought of Ordalisa as a person, but only as an extra part of the house. Little by little, the two become friends, which awakens jealousy in her other employer, the man's wife.

Ordalisa continues the daily conversations with the ugly crucifix, but the imperfections of the figure keep bothering her, so she thinks about fixing them herself. Although Ordalisa has no confidence in her wood carving ability, the ugly crucifix gives her encouragement and convinces her to try. She buys tools and starts the task of carving the figure, an activity she finds greatly stimulating, and in which she performs much better that she had thought. However, she can only work on carving during the brief moments she is free from domestic tasks. The idea of opening her own workshop appears more and more attractive.

The boss falls ill and Ordalisa becomes closer to him. One day she decides to show the ugly crucifix to him, and her boss is surprised by her talent, but after looking for some tools she finds him dead. Ordalisa is very sad and decides to carve the face of the ugly crucifix to look like her boss. The crucifix encourages her in this and in all of the changes that occur, such as making a native plait for it and removing the figure from the cross to represent it resurrected. However, one day the boss' wife enters Ordalisa's room and sees the ugly crucifix with the face of her husband, sending her into a fit of anger which causes her to throw the figure into the fire, not caring how much Ordalisa tried to stop her.

Ordalisa collects her things and leaves the house. Although she knows that she won't hear the voice of the ugly crucifix anymore, she feels happy and free, thinking of all the images she now hopes to carve.

== Main characters ==
- Ordalisa: the protagonist of the novel, who works as a domestic employee. For the large part of the novel, she is guided by the voice of the ugly crucifix and goes leaving behind the submissiveness that at the beginning characterized her. Repairing the ugly crucifix allowed her to discover her creativity and her passion for art, which turn into the forces that bring her to feel fulfilled as a person. At the end of the novel, she leaves her boss' house and goes in search of a new life in which she can practise her vocation as a creator.
- The ugly crucifix: the wooden crucifix with which Ordalisa converses during the novel. Its shape is described as stunted: while the arms are thin at the ends, the shoulders are well-built; the legs, however, are too short. According to Ordalisa, these imperfections must have been carved by a drunk sculptor a long time before. Its personality is jovial, and it has a great sense of humor.
- The boss: an older man, obsessed with his stamp collection and trapped in his routine, all of it as a strategy in order to not confront his monotonous and boring marriage. His contact with Ordalisa leads him to see her as a person for the first time and to quit his self-absorption. As a result, he starts to take up other activities, mainly in the garden.
- The boss' wife: described as a superficial and bad-tempered woman who spends the days at high society charitable events and the nights watching telenovelas. She worries a lot about her weight and physical appearance. When she notices the change in her husband and his closeness to Ordalisa she begins to feel jealous. From that moment, the idea of having plastic surgery becomes her new obsession.

== Central themes ==
One of the central themes in El Cristo Feo is the building of personal identity and self-improvement as forms of withstanding the oppressive practices in domestic work. From the beginning of the novel, Ordalisa's life is shown as full of loss despite having a stable job, which also takes too much effort to leave time for her own aspirations. Ordalisa's position of social submission is constantly emphasized in the novel, which talks of "class distancing", "unquestioning obedience" and puts phrases like "you are only the servant of the house" in the mouth of the employers, who find it inconceivable to imagine that a woman like Ordalisa could have thoughts of her own.

When Ordalisa starts carving the deformed figure of the ugly crucifix, it awakens in her the desire to leave a mark on the world, to express her thoughts and emotions. It is in this way that the process of transformation of the ugly crucifix passes to reflect its own change in Ordalisa, who by removing the ugly and malformed parts of the crucifix discovers the creative potential that she has inside. In this manner, Yánez shows Ordalisa relinquishing her submission and docility through creativity and artistic creation, which together she expresses in the physical changes and in being more concerned about her own desires. The transformation brings Ordalisa to question the relations of power in domestic work and abuse that she had been subjected to, which in the end gives her sufficient security to abandon the house in search of a new future.

In relation to the creative search of female artists, Yánez places attention on the disadvantages that they suffer in comparison to men due to gender roles. About this she expresses, in the words of Ordalisa:

If I were not a woman, but a male sculptor, if I were a poet, a painter or any artist, I would say to my wife and children: Psst, don't bother me, don't make a racket! I am doing my job [...]. Then my wife would come from time to time walking on tiptoe, she would timidly open the door of the workshop to bring me coffee already prepared, with sugar, very hot... She would stay standing, not daring to look at my unfinished work, only looking at me, clutching her apron until I finished drinking.

Another theme presented in the novel is the reconsideration of the notions of spirituality and the divine, which is explored to demonstrate a distorted image of the classical idea of god. From the first conversations that Ordalisa has with the ugly crucifix, she finds herself surprised, firstly by the ugliness of the image, then by the personality of the crucifix, who treats her in a personal manner in which camaraderie and humor rule, on the contrary to what she had imagined.

This type of critique of traditional religious concepts continues through a large part of the novel, such as when Ordalisa obtains money after selling a wardrobe and feels confused to see that the crucifix pushes her to buy something for herself instead of donating the money to the church, to which she responds that he never would have thought of taking from her the little money that she had, and less because a parish priest buy candles or some other thing that "God couldn't care less about". Later, Ordalisa reflects between tears about the tragedies that have occurred, and that they brought her to reject the idea that they must be considered as "tests from heaven", putting emphasis on how a mother would never test her child in that way. Towards the end of the novel, this idea of maternity is resumed by Ordalisa and finishes identifying her new conception of divinity, saying to the ugly crucifix: "I remember my mother, because being who you are, if it is in reality, you are what I want to imagine, you are concerned equally about my body as my soul."

== Writing and reception ==
According to the author, El Cristo Feo was rewritten twice before arriving at the final version. The first draft featured a protagonist inspired by a person of her surroundings, but the possibility of it being obvious who the character in the novel was based upon caused Yánez to discard this idea. The plot of this version followed a woman with creative aspirations focussed on the conflicts generated by having an artist husband. For the final version, Yánez decided to use the figure of the wooden crucifix, whilst in the previous version the role of the crucifix was taken up by a painting of the Crucifixion by Matthias Grünewald.

The novel is narrated in third person through an omniscient narrator.

El Cristo Feo won the Joaquín Gallegos Lara Prize as the best Ecuadorian novel of the year, awarded by the municipality of Quito. It also won the Indigo Coté Femmes de París Prize, awarded in 1996 after conflict in the presentation of the Premio Sor Juana Inés de la Cruz in which the French judges chose Yánez as the winner and the Mexican judges chose Elena Garro. To resolve the impasse, it was decided that Garro would take the Premio Sor Juana and Yánez the Indigo Coté Femmes.

The American critic Seymour Menton called El Cristo Feo "one of the best Latin American novels of the post-revolutionary period". Among the positive aspects, he underlined the authenticity and development of the characters of Ordalisa and the male boss, in addition to the optimistic nature of the work and the perspective with which it presents the social critique in comparison with classic protest novels. The professor Miriam Merchán also emphasised the character of Ordalisa, referring to her as a "symbol of the situation of the marginalization of women and the possible routes that open for their acceptance as human beings".

The literary critic Antonio Sacoto labelled the work as "enjoyable" and asserted that the criticism of working conditions for female domestic workers was developed "soberly" and that it was a theme "very well-drafted".
