= Sor Juana Inés de la Cruz Prize =

Mexican literary award for women

The Sor Juana Inés de la Cruz Prize (Premio Sor Juana Inés de la Cruz) is a literary prize awarded to a book written in Spanish by a female author. It is organized by the Guadalajara International Book Fair, based in Guadalajara, Jalisco, Mexico. As of 2026, winners of the prize receive USD10,000.

== History ==
This prize is named after the 17th century Mexican writer, Sor Juana Inés de la Cruz who is considered the first great Latin American poet and one of the most important Hispanic literary figures. Sor Juana was persecuted for being an intellectual, a woman, a nun, and a writer who wrote quite provocatively.

The prize has been given out since 1993, and is given out at the yearly Guadalajara International Book Fair (Feria Internacional del Libro de Guadalajara).

== Winners ==
- 2026 Josefina Licitra (Argentina) Crac
- 2025: Fernanda Trías (Uruguay) El monte de las furias
- 2024: Gabriela Cabezón Cámara (Argentina) Las niñas del naranjel (translated as We Are Green and Trembling)
- 2023: María Ospina Pizano (Colombia) Solo un poco aquí
- 2022: Daniela Tarazona (Mexico) Isla partida
- 2021: Fernanda Trías (Uruguay) Mugre rosa (translated by Heather Cleary as Pink Slime)
- 2020: Camila Sosa Villada (Argentina) Las malas
- 2019: Maria Gainza (Argentina) La luz negra
- 2018: Clara Usón (Spain) El asesino tímido
- 2017: Nona Fernández (Chile) La dimensión desconocida
- 2016: Marina Perezagua (Spain) Yoro
- 2015: Perla Suez (Argentina) El país del diablo
- 2014: Inés Fernández Moreno (Argentina) El cielo no existe
- 2013: Ana García Bergua (Mexico) La bomba de San José
- 2012: Lina Meruane (Chile) Sangre en el Ojo (translated by Megan McDowell as Seeing Red)
- 2011: Almudena Grandes (Spain) Inés y la alegría
- 2010: Claudia Piñeiro (Argentina) Las grietas de Jara (translated by Miranda France as A Crack in the Wall)
- 2009: Cristina Rivera Garza (Mexico) La muerte me da
- 2008: Gioconda Belli (Nicaragua) El Infinito en la palma de la mano (translated by Margaret Sayers Peden as Infinity in the Palm of Her Hand)
- 2007: Tununa Mercado Yo nunca te prometí la eternidad
- 2006: Claudia Amengual (Uruguay) Desde las cenizas
- 2005: Paloma Villegas Agosto y fuga (August Escape)
- 2004: Cristina Sánchez-Andrade Ya no pisa la tierra tu rey
- 2003: Margo Glantz El rastro
- 2002: Ana Gloria Moya Cielo de tambores (Sky of Drums)
- 2001: Cristina Rivera Garza Nadie me verá llorar
- 2000: No award
- 1999: Sylvia Iparraguirre La tierra del fuego
- 1998: Silvia Molina El amor que me juraste (translated by David Unger as The Love You Promised Me)
- 1997: Laura Restrepo Dulce compañía (translated by Dolores M. Koch as The Angel of Galilea)
- 1996:
  - Elena Garro Busca mi esquela (translated as Look for My Obituary)
  - Alicia Yánez Cossío El cristo feo (ex-aequo)
- 1995: Tatiana Lobo Asalto al paraíso (translated by Asa Zatz as Assault on Paradise)
- 1994: Marcela Serrano Nosotras que nos queremos tanto
- 1993: Angelina Muñiz-Huberman Dulcinea encantada

== See also ==
- List of literary awards honoring women
