= Gonzalo Celorio =

Mexican writer

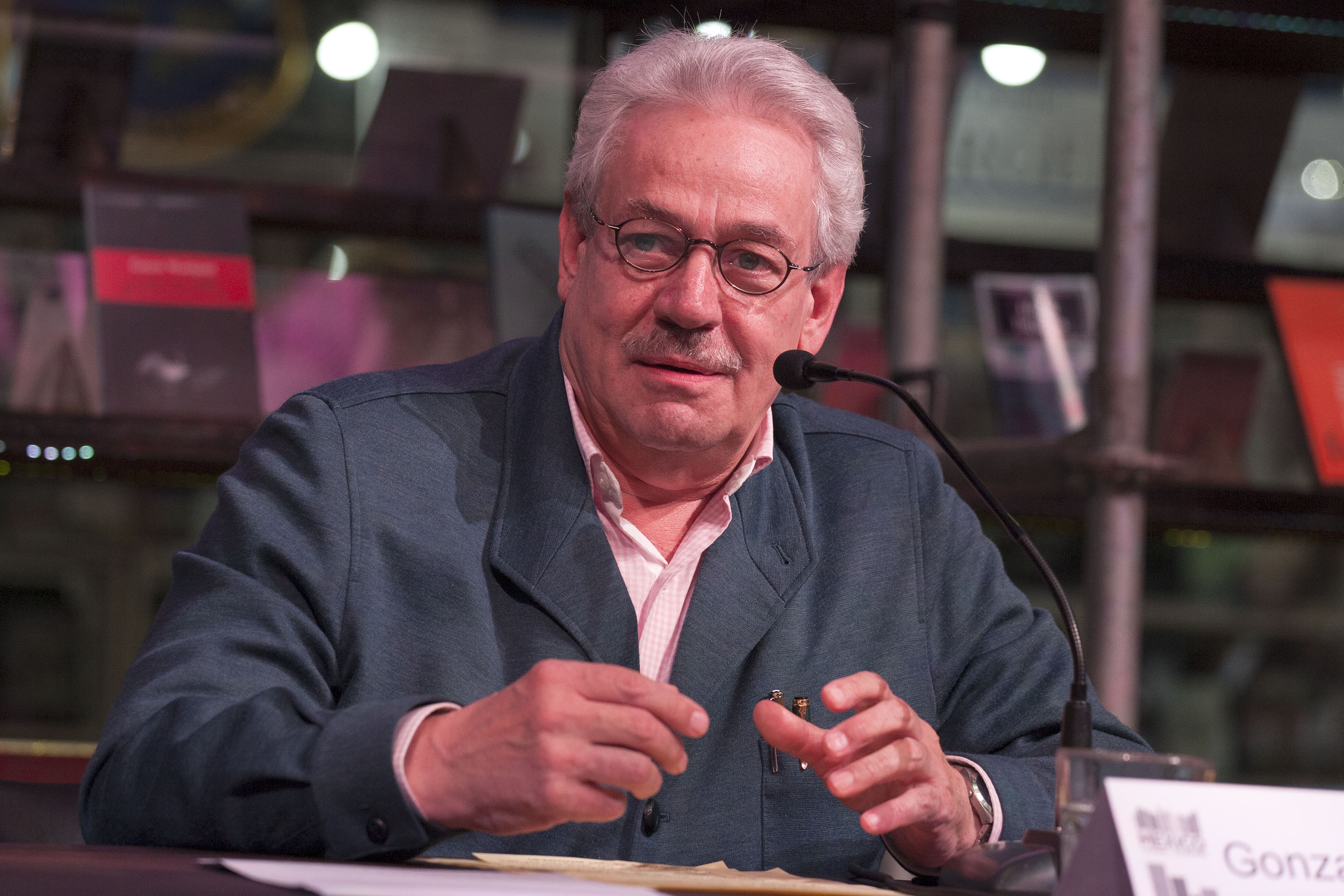
- Celorio in 2015
- Born: Gonzalo Edmundo Celorio Blasco; 25 March 1948 (age 78); Mexico City, Mexico
- Alma mater: UNAM
- Occupation: Writer • Editor
- Writing career
- Language: Spanish
- Genres: Novel; Essay
- Notable works: Mentideros de la memoria; El metal y la escoria
- Notable awards: National Prize for Arts and Sciences; Xavier Villaurrutia Award; Cervantes Prize

Gonzalo Edmundo Celorio Blasco (Note: In this Spanish name, the first or paternal surname is Celorio and the second or maternal family name is Blasco.) (born 25 March 1948) is a Mexican writer, essayist, literary critic, and academic. Since 2019 he has served as the director of the Mexican Academy of Language. From 2000 to 2002, he was director of the Economic Cultural Fund. He won the Miguel de Cervantes Prize, the most prestigious literary award in the Spanish-speaking world, in 2025.

He obtained a bachelor's degree in language and literature from the National Autonomous University of Mexico (UNAM), and a doctorate in Ibero-American literature from the same university.

== Biography ==
Celorio was born in Mexico City in 1948. His paternal grandfather Emeterio Celorio Santoveña immigrated to Mexico from Llanes, Asturias, in 1874 and his maternal grandparents originated from Cuba. His family’s life was narrated in the novels Tres lindas cubanas, published in 2006, where he talks about his mother's family; El metal y la escoria, published in 2014, about his father's family and Los apóstatas, published in 2020, about two of his twelve brothers.

Celorio studied literature and philology at the School of Philosophy and Letters of the Universidad Nacional Autónoma de México (UNAM). He was a student of historian Edmundo O'Gorman. Between 2000 and 2002 he was the director of the Fondo de Cultura Económica.

Celorio has written five novels, Amor Propio, a coming-of-age story, Y retiemble en sus centros la Tierra and the Una familia ejemplar trilogy about his family (Tres lindas cubanas, El metal y la escoria and Los apóstatas).

== Awards, fellowships and recognition ==
In 1986, he received the Cultural Journalism Award, granted by the Instituto Nacional de Bellas Artes y Literatura (INBA), for Los subrayados son míos; in 1997, he was awarded the Prix des deux océans, given by the Biarritz Festival, for his work El viaje sedentario, translated into French; and in 1999, the National IMPAC/CONARTE/ITESM Novel Award for the novel Y retiemble en sus centros la tierra.

He was elected as a member of the Academia Mexicana de la Lengua (Mexican Academy of Language) in 1995. In February 2019 he became director of the institution.

In 2011, he was awarded the National Prize for Arts and Sciences in the Linguistics and literature, the highest distincion the Mexican government gives to artists.

He is also a member of the Academia Cubana de la Lengua.

In 2015, he was awarded the Premio Mazatlán de Literatura for his novel El metal y la escoria. In 2023, he received the Xavier Villaurrutia Award for his memoirs Mentideros de la memoria.

Celorio received Spain's Cervantes Prize in 2025 for his "exceptional literary work and intellectual endeavours, through which he has made a profound and sustained contribution to the enrichment of the Spanish language and culture".

== Works ==
- El viaje sedentario

=== Novels ===
- Amor propio, Tusquets Editores, Mexico City, 1991.
- Y retiemble en sus centros la tierra, Tusquets Editores, Mexico City, 1999.
- Tres lindas cubanas, Tusquets Editores, Mexico City, 2006.
- El metal y la escoria, Tusquets Editores, Mexico City, 2014.
- Los apóstatas, Tusquets Editores, Mexico City, 2020.

=== Essay ===
- La época sordina, Cal y Arena, Mexico City, 1990.
- Ensayo de contraconquista, Tusquets Editores, Mexico City, 2001.
- Cánones subversivos. Ensayos de literatura hispanoamericana, Tusquets Editores, Mexico City, 2009.

=== Memoirs ===
- Mentideros de la memoria, Tusquets Editores, Mexico City, 2022.
