= Tununa Mercado =

Argentine writer (born 1939)

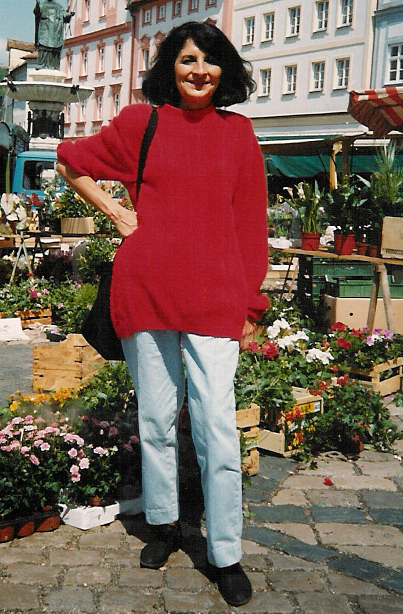
Tununa Mercado in 1993

Nilda Mercado, known by the pen name Tununa Mercado, is an Argentine writer. She was born on 25 December 1939 in Cordoba, Argentina. She retained her childhood nickname "Tununa" as her literary pen name. She has written novels, short stories and essays. She has won several literary prizes, including the Sor Juana Ines de la Cruz Prize.

== Works ==
- 1967 - Celebrar a la mujer como a una pascua (Cuentos)
- 1987 - Antieros (Cuento)
- 1988 - Canon de alcoba (Cuentos)
- 1990 - En estado de memoria (Novela)
- 1994 - La letra de lo mínimo (Ensayo)
- 1996 - La madriguera (Novela)
- 2003 - Narrar después (Ensayos)
- 2005 - Yo nunca te prometí la eternidad (Novela)
