= Perla Suez =

Argentinean writer and translator (born 1947)

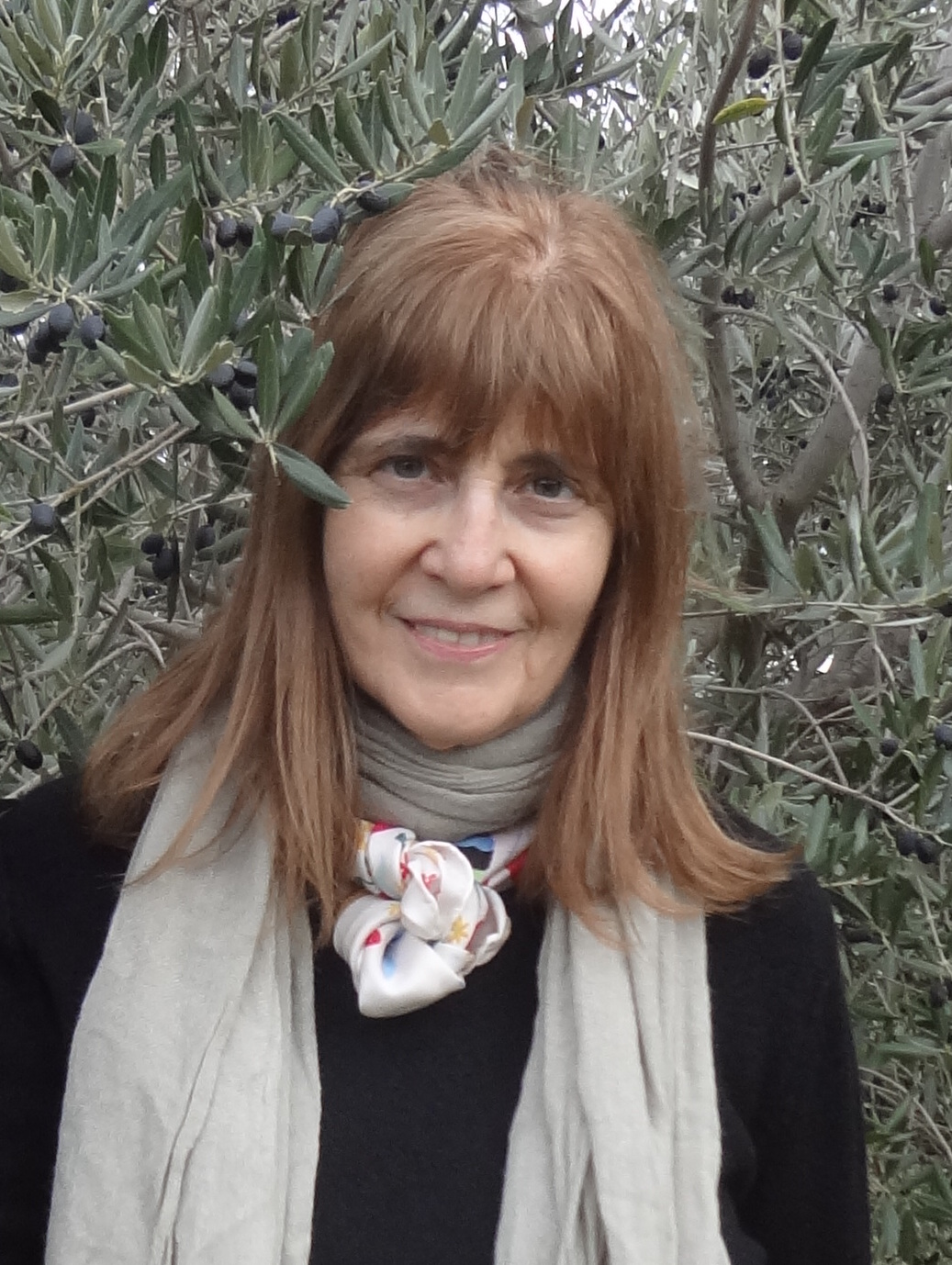
- Suze in 2014
- Born: 28 November 1947 (age 78); Córdoba, Argentina
- Occupation: Author
- Writing career
- Language: Spanish
- Genres: Fiction, children's, essays
- Notable work: El país del diablo
- Notable awards: Sor Juana Inés de la Cruz Prize; Rómulo Gallegos International Novel Prize; Guggenheim Fellowship
- Website: perlasuez.com.ar

Perla Suez (born 28 November 1947) is an Argentinean novelist, translator, and children's author. She is a recipient of the Sor Juana Inés de la Cruz Prize.

== Background ==
Suez was born in Córdoba, and grew up in Basavilbaso. She received a BA in Modern Literature at the National University of Córdoba, also studying psycho-pedagogy and cinematography.

Between 1977 and 1978 she conducted research at the University of Paris-VII before working at the International Centre for Pedagogical Studies at Sèvres.

Suez co-founded the Centro de Difusión e Investigación de Literatura Infantil y Juvenil (Center for Broadcast and Investigation of Children and Juvenile Literature) and was Director of the centre between 1984–1994.

Suez has also co-directed Piedra Libre magazine, a publication promoting reading and literature in Latin America and the Caribbean.

== Works ==
=== Novels ===
Selected publications by Suez include:

- El Arresto (2001, Norma)
- El país del diablo (2015, Edhasa)
- Letargo (2000, Norma)
- Humo Rojo (2012, Edhasa)
- La Pasajera (2008, Norma)
- La Trilogía de Entre Ríos (2006, Norma), trilogy of Letargo, El Arresto, and Complot
- Complot (2004, Norma)
- Tumba Tumba Tetumba (2001, Alción Editora)

La Trilogía de Entre Ríos was published in English as The Entre Ríos Trilogy (2006, The University of New Mexico Press) and translated by Rhonda Dahl Buchanan. It has also been translated into Italian (in 2009 as Il fiumi della memoria), German and French. Letargo was translated into English by Rhonda Dahl Buchanan and Italian by Luigi Cojazzi.

=== Children's books ===
Suez has written a number of Spanish language children's books including:

- El Vuelo del Barrilete y Otros Cuentos (1985, El Ateneo)
- Papá, Mamá ¿Me dan permiso? (1989, El Ateneo)
- El viaje de un cuis muy gris (1991, Sudamericana)
- Memorias de Vladimir (1991, Alfaguara)
- El Cuento del Pajarito (1991, Sudamericana)
- Dimitri en la tormenta (1993)
- El Árbol de los Flecos (1995, Sudamericana)
- Un golpe de buena suerte (2006, E.D.B)
- El señor de los globos (2006, Educando)
- Los tres pajaritos (2007, Sudamericana)
- Arciboldo (2009, Communicate)
- ¡Blum! (2011, Communicate)
- Un oso (2014, Comunicarte)
- Lara y su lobo (2014, Communicate)
- El huemul (2014, Communicate)
- Espero (2015, La brujita de papel)
- Las Flores de Hielo (2015, Comunicarte)
- El hombrecito de polvo (2015, Comunicarte)
- Uma (2016, Comunicarte)

== Awards ==
In 2015 she won the Sor Juana Inés de la Cruz Prize (Premio Sor Juana Inés de la Cruz) for her book, El país del diablo. As part of the award, the book will be translated into English for publication.

In 1993 she received a Special Mention by the Argentinean Commission of Israeli Women for the story 'Aaron y la Cabra' and in 1997 her body of work was given an Honorable Mention for the World Prize for Children's Literature José Martí.

In 2001, Letargo was a finalist for the Rómulo Gallegos Prize.

In 2005, her novel Complot was a finalist for the Grinzane Cavour Foundation's International Award, and in 2008, The Entre Ríos Trilogy won the Grinzane Cavour-Montevideo International Award First Prize.

Two of her books have been selected by the International Youth Library as 'White Ravens', noteworthy books for children, Memorias de Vladimir in 1992 and El árbol de los flecos in 1996.

Suez was awarded a Guggenheim Fellowship in the field fiction (for Latin America & Caribbean) in 2007.

In 2020, her novel El país del diablo won the Rómulo Gallegos International Novel Prize.
