= List of ambassadors of Spain to Jamaica =

Ambassador of Spain to Jamaica
- Coat of arms of Spain
- Incumbent; José María Fernández López de Turiso since 6 November 2024
- Ministry of Foreign Affairs; Secretariat of State for Ibero-America
- Style: The Most Excellent
- Residence: Kingston
- Nominator: The Foreign Minister
- Appointer: The Monarch
- Term length: At the government's pleasure
- Inaugural holder: Carlos Goyeneche Silvela, 4th Marquess of Balbueno
- Formation: 1971
- Website: Mission of Spain to Jamaica

The ambassador of Spain to Jamaica is the official representative of the Kingdom of Spain to Jamaica. It also represents Spain to Antigua and Barbuda, the Commonwealth of The Bahamas, the Commonwealth of Dominica and the Federation of Saint Kitts and Nevis. Additionally, it represents Spanish interests before the International Seabed Authority (ISA).

Jamaica was part of the Spanish Empire until the mid-17th century, and this island, along with other Caribbean territories, remained part of the Columbus family's heritage —the Duchy of Veragua and the Marquessate of Jamaica— until the 1550s, when they reverted to the Crown. Since the 1650s, it was a British colony, and the formal diplomatic relations were channeled through the Court of St James's.

After the independence of Jamaica in 1962, Spain recognized the country and established diplomatic relations in 1967, creating a non-resident embassy in Kingston. During this period, the ambassador was posted in Port-au-Prince, Haiti. In 1977, Spain established a resident embassy in Kingston. In 1994, when the ISA was founded, Spain accredited its ambassador as its permanent representative.

== Jurisdiction ==
- Jamaica: The Embassy of Spain in Kingston represents Spain to the Jamaican authorities and it has a Consular Section that provides consular assistance to the Spanish residents in the island of Jamaica. In addition, there is an honorary consular agent in Montego Bay.

Both the ambassador and the consul in Kingston are accredited and supervise the diplomatic and consular affairs of the following countries.

- Antigua and Barbuda: Spain and Antigua and Barbuda established diplomatic relations in 1988 and, the following year, Spain established an embassy, resident in Kingston. Consular services are provided by an Honorary Vice-Consulate in Ffryes, Saint Mary.
- The Bahamas: Diplomatic relations with both countries were established on 1 December 1976 and, in March 1978, Spain created the non-resident Embassy in Nassau. To assist Spaniards in the Commonwealth, there is an honorary consulate at the Lyford Financial Centre (West Bay, Nassau).
- Dominica: Diplomatically united since 1980, the ambassador to Jamaica serves as ambassador to Dominica since 1986.
- Saint Kitts and Nevis: Both countries established diplomatic relations in 1987. An honorary consulate in Charlestown, Nevis serves this jurisdiction.
- International Seabed Authority: Since its establishment in 1994, the ambassador to Jamaica has served as permanent representative of Spain to the ISA.

In the past, this embassy was also accredited to Barbados (1986–2001), Grenada (1986–2001), Saint Vincent and the Grenadines (1987–2001) and Saint Lucia (1987–2011).

== List of ambassadors ==
Ambassador		Term	Nominated by	Appointed by	Accredited to
The ambassador to Haiti from 1964 to 1971.
1	Mariano Sanz Briz (Note: Resident in Port-au-Prince, Haiti); Marquess of Balbueno	6 March 1971 – 24 June 1972 (1 year, 110 days)	Gregorio López-Bravo	Francisco Franco	Florizel Glasspole
2	Valentín Alejandro Alzina de Boschi	14 October 1972 – 12 September 1977 (4 years, 333 days)	Gregorio López-Bravo	Francisco Franco	Florizel Glasspole
3	Joaquín Cervino Santías (Note: Accredited to the Bahamas.)	12 September 1977 – 15 March 1983 (5 years, 184 days)	The Marquess of Oreja	Juan Carlos I	Florizel Glasspole
4	Juan Lugo Roig (Note: Accredited to the Bahamas, Barbados, Dominica, Grenada, Guyana and Saint Lucia.)	15 March 1983 – 25 July 1987 (4 years, 132 days)	Fernando Morán	Juan Carlos I	Florizel Glasspole
5	Ignacio Masferrer y Sala (Note: Accredited to the Bahamas, Barbados, Dominica, Grenada, Saint Kitts and Nevis, Saint Lucia and Saint Vincent and the Grenadines.)	25 July 1987 – 21 January 1989 (1 year, 180 days)	Francisco Fernández Ordóñez	Juan Carlos I	Florizel Glasspole
6	Ricardo Zalacaín Jorge (Note: Accredited to Antigua and Barbuda, the Bahamas, Barbados, Dominica, Grenada, Saint Kitts and Nevis, Saint Lucia and Saint Vincent and the Grenadines.)	21 January 1989 – 16 December 1992 (3 years, 178 days)	Francisco Fernández Ordóñez	Juan Carlos I	Florizel Glasspole
7	Ramiro Pérez-Maura	6 February 1993 – 20 July 1996 (3 years, 165 days)	Javier Solana	Juan Carlos I	Howard Cooke
8	Fernando de la Serna Inciarte	2 September 1996 – 23 June 2001 (4 years, 294 days)	Abel Matutes	Juan Carlos I	Howard Cooke
9	Rafael Adolfo Jover y de Mora-Figueroa	23 June 2001 – 5 July 2005 (4 years, 12 days)	Josep Piqué	Juan Carlos I	Howard Cooke
10	Jesús Silva Fernández (Note: Accredited to Antigua and Barbuda, the Bahamas, Dominica, Saint Kitts and Nevis, and Saint Lucia.)	5 July 2005 – 18 September 2010 (5 years, 75 days)	Miguel Ángel Moratinos	Juan Carlos I	Kenneth O. Hall
11	María Celsa Nuño García (Note: Accredited to Antigua and Barbuda, the Bahamas, Dominica and Saint Kitts and Nevis.)	18 September 2010 – 7 June 2014 (3 years, 262 days)	Miguel Ángel Moratinos	Juan Carlos I	Patrick Allen
12	Aníbal Jiménez Abascal	28 June 2014 – 11 December 2015† (1 year, 166 days)	José Manuel García-Margallo	Juan Carlos I	Patrick Allen
-	Carmen Rives Ruiz-Tapiador	11 December 2015 – 1 April 2017 (1 year, 111 days)	Charge d'affaires		
13	Josep María Bosch Bessa	1 April 2017 – 2 December 2020 (3 years, 245 days)	Alfonso Dastis	Felipe VI	Patrick Allen
14	Diego Bermejo Romero de Terreros	2 December 2020 – 6 November 2024 (3 years, 340 days)	Arancha González Laya	Felipe VI	Patrick Allen
15	José María Fernández López de Turiso	6 November 2024 – present	José Manuel Albares	Felipe VI	Patrick Allen

== See also ==
- Jamaica–Spain relations
- The Bahamas–Spain relations
- Marquess of Jamaica
