= Elena Blasco =

Spanish multidisciplinary artist

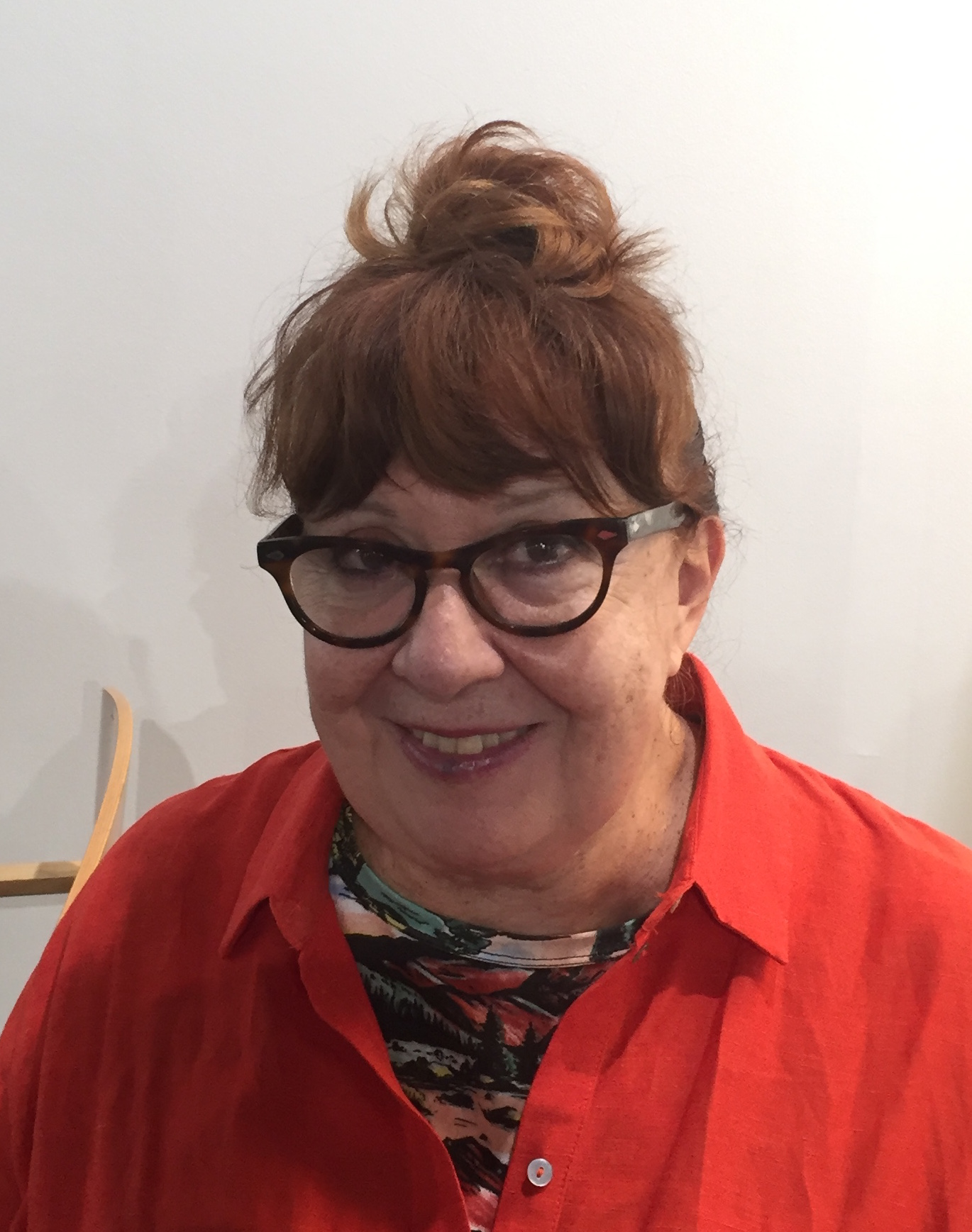
- Elena Blasco at the 2019 ARCO Art Fair
- Born: 1950 (age 75–76); Madrid, Spain
- Education: Complutense University of Madrid
- Occupations: Artist, teacher
- Employer: School of Arts and Crafts of Madrid
- Website: www.elenablasco.com

Elena Blasco (born 1950) is a Spanish multidisciplinary artist who works in photography, painting, and installations. With a subjective and ironic view, she recreates everyday objects and settings to build a personal and unique identity into her works, in some cases referring to gender violence and social injustice.

== Career ==
Elena Blasco earned a licentiate from the Complutense University of Madrid's Faculty of Fine Arts in 1974, opting to specialize in painting. She graduated in Photography and Decoration from the Madrid School of Plastic Arts.

She held her first exhibition in 1976, during a decade in which conceptual experiences mingled with political attitudes, along with the so-called "new Madrid figuration" that claimed a return to painting and its expressive and conceptual potential.

In the 1990s her work began to gain popularity and was acquired by collections and museums.

Blasco's artistic style amalgamates very diverse works where the interplay of colors and techniques is characterized, combining photography, painting, and installations. However, despite the casual and lively atmosphere that is created around her productions, the aim and background of her works are paradoxically radical in terms of the meanings she projects, questioning canonical prejudices of today's society. Several of her works incorporate debates about gender.

Women have never had attention paid to us, in art or in anything. That does not exist anymore; it will not be able to be any longer. Women of my age will not be given time to see real equality; much progress has been made but nothing for what we need.

In her 2012 monographic exhibition "Millones y abundantes razones" (Millions and Abundant Reasons) at the Community of Madrid's Sala Alcalá, curated by Alicia Murría, she presented hundreds of works that showed her recognizable and original imagery.

Blasco has been a teacher at the School of Arts and Crafts of Madrid since 2002, and is a member of the Association of Women in the Visual Arts (MAV).

== Individual exhibitions ==
- 1976: "En el estudio. Estandartes y collages I". Outdoor assemblage, Madrid.
- 1979: "En el estudio. Los americanos II". Outdoor assemblage. Madrid.
- 1983: Ateneo de Málaga, Málaga. - 1982 "La evolución de las especies de cuadros". Galería Montenegro, Madrid. - 1982 Galería Almuzara, Segovia.
- 1986: "Todo se me hace poco para ti". Galería Angel Romero, Madrid.
- 1989: Galería Angel Romero, Madrid.
- 1991: "Al deseo lo meneo". Galería Angel Romero, Madrid. "La desproporción". Galería Estampa, Madrid. Galerie Snoëi, Rotterdam (Holanda).Galería Berini, Barcelona.
- 1992: Gemeentemuseum Arhem, Arhem (Países Bajos)
- 1993: Galería Rafael Ortiz, Seville.
- 1994: "No os asustéis, ya estoy aquí yo". Galería Angel Romero, Madrid; Galería Mácula, Alicante; Galería Berini, Barcelona.
- 1995: Galería Vanguardia, Bilbao.
- 1996: "¿Por qué disimuláis?, cualquiera reconoce una flecha". Galería Siboney, Santander.
- 1997: "Búfalos son Búfalos". Galería Angel Romero, Madrid.
- 1998: "Sólo quiero no extrañar el cielo". Galería Trinta. Santiago de Compostela. "Búfalos son Búfalos". Galería Berini, Barcelona.
- 2001: Espacio Caja Burgos, Burgos. - 2000 "...se puede, se puede... se podía". Galería Fúcares, Madrid.
- 2002: "ytúúúuuuuqueteeeecreíííííiaselrey/adetoooodoelmuuuundoooooo". Sala Alameda. Provincial Deputation of Málaga. Málaga.
- 2004: "Como si no supiera nada de lo que sé que sé". Galería Fúcares; Madrid. Galería Trinta; Santiago de Compostela - 2003 Galería Fúcares Almagro, Ciudad Real.
- 2007: "Muchacha con idea clavo". Galería Fúcares, Madrid.
- 2008: "Muchacha con idea clavo". Centro cultural CC Bastero Kulturgunea, Guipúzcoa.
- 2012: "Millones y abundantes razones". Sala Alcalá 31, Madrid.
- 2016: "Por alegrías". Galería Alegría, Madrid.
