= Cristina Sánchez-Andrade =

Spanish writer and translator

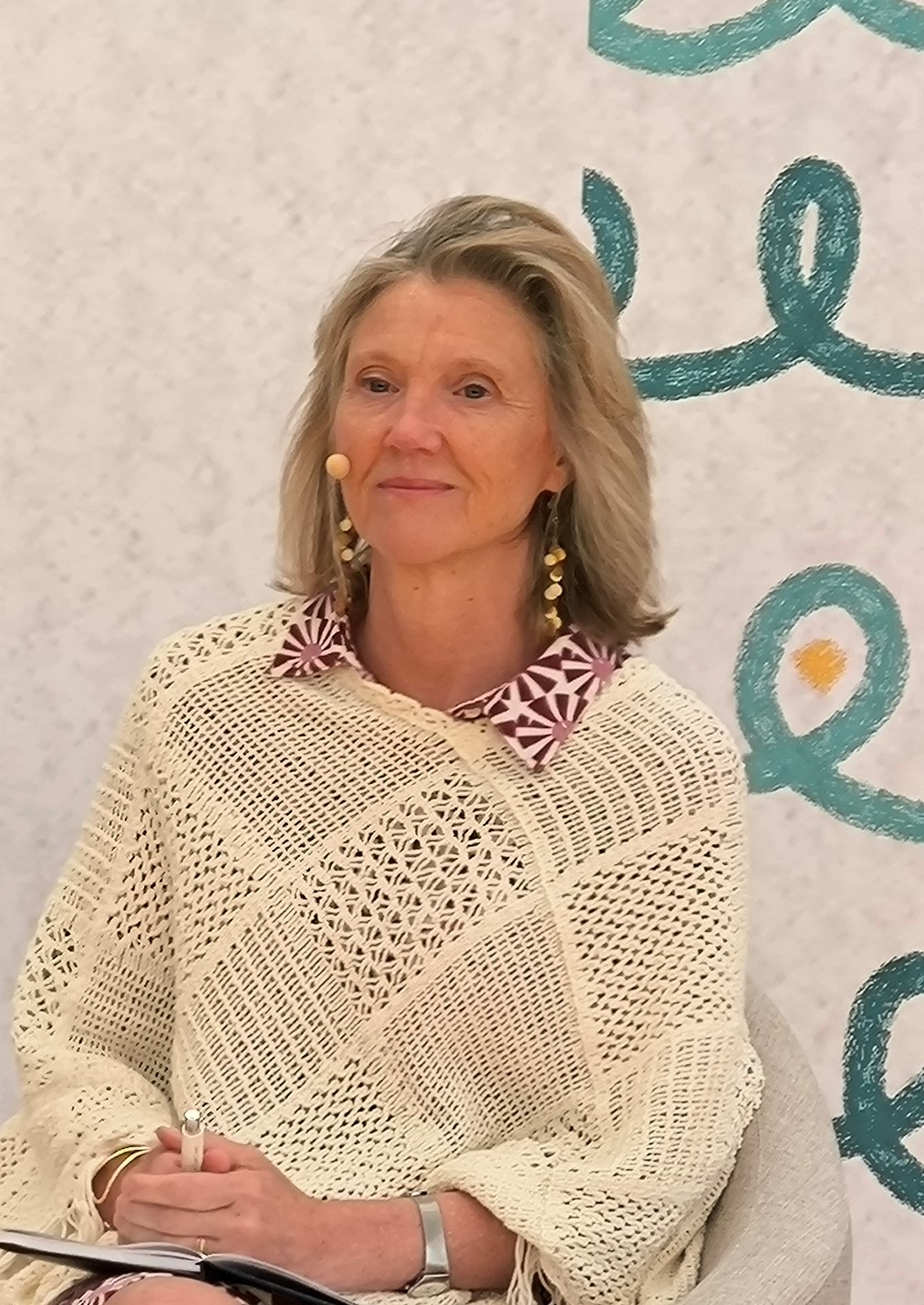
- Festa dos Libros 2024
- Born: 5 April 1968 (age 58); Santiago de Compostela, Spain
- Education: Autonomous University of Madrid
- Occupations: Writer, critic, translator
- Awards: Sor Juana Inés de la Cruz Prize (2004)

Cristina Sánchez-Andrade (born 5 April 1968) is a Spanish writer and translator of partial English descent. In 2004 she won the Sor Juana Inés de la Cruz Prize for her work Ya no pisa la tierra tu rey (Your King No Longer Treads the Earth). Her 2014 novel Las Inviernas was a finalist for the Premio Herralde, and in translation (by Samuel Ritter as The Winterlings) won two English PEN awards.

== Biography ==
Cristina Sánchez-Andrade was born in Santiago de Compostela on 5 April 1968, the daughter of a Galician father and an English mother. She has a licentiate in information sciences from the Complutense University, one in law from the National University of Distance Education, and a master's degree in community law from the Autonomous University of Madrid, the city where she resides. She divides her time between writing and English–Spanish translation, as well as teaching narrative workshops, and her own work has been translated into several languages. She has been a guest speaker at several international universities and literary festivals.

== Writing career ==
Sánchez-Andrade's stories have earned several literary awards, and in 1999 she published Las lagartijas huelen a hierba, a novel about the search for identity that was well-received for its narrative originality and structure. Bueyes y rosas dormían (2001), her second novel, is set in an indefinite time, in an oppressive, fictional, and archetypal place called Pueblo.

With Ya no pisa la tierra tu rey, she won the 2004 Sor Juana Inés de la Cruz Prize, awarded by the Guadalajara International Book Fair. The novel, with a collective protagonist – a congregation of nuns – reveals a recurring theme: criticism of collective manifestations that may lead people to think not as individuals but as a mass, and to make decisions not out of reflection and personal evaluation, but because of that weakness that comes from the need to belong to the flock and shelter in it.

Her 2007 novel Coco tells the story of French designer Coco Chanel, and she returned to this format to narrate the life of Christina of Norway, a 13th-century medieval princess who traveled to Spain to marry an infant brother of King Alfonso X. This historical novel was published in 2010 with the title Los escarpines de Kristina de Noruega, and was a finalist for the Spartacus Historical Novel Award in 2011.

Moving away from fiction, Sánchez-Andrade published El libro de Julieta (2010), a collection of anecdotes and sincere reflections from day-to-day life with her daughter Julieta, who has Down syndrome.

With Las Inviernas (2014), she won recognition on the international literary scene. Highly praised by the Spanish and foreign press, it has been translated into English, German, Italian, Portuguese, Polish, and Italian. In addition to being a finalist for the Premio Herralde in 2014 and the Premio Mandarache in 2016, it received two English PEN awards, one for translation and one for the promotion of it. In this novel, two sisters return to their hometown after years of absence because of the Spanish Civil War. Both have a secret related to their grandfather, and their presence agitates consciences and stirs up the lives of neighbors. Through oral testimony, it immerses readers in the atmosphere of inner Galicia. The stories on which it was based, mostly told by the author's paternal grandmother, involve premonitions, visions, and apparitions derived from superstition and religion.

47 trocitos, her first children's novel, is a humorous story that talks about diversity and the importance of accepting others as they are.

The plot of Alguien bajo los párpados (2017) unites two stories set in the same surroundings and distanced in time. One, contemporary, refers to a car trip by a wealthy lady, Mrs. Olvido, and her maid, Bruna. The other goes back to the Republic, the Civil War, and the beginning of the Franco regime. The trip fosters the recovery of the past and the panoramic painting of a peculiar family group whose center is occupied by the lady and her usual servant-companion.

In 2014, Sánchez-Andrade was the guest author of the Hawthornden Literary Retreat in Scotland.

In 2017 she was guest author at Villa Sarkia in Finland, and that year she also received a Cultura Viva National Award for narrative.

== Bibliography ==
- 1999: Las lagartijas huelen a hierba
- 2001: Bueyes y rosas dormían (Siruela)
- 2003: Ya no pisa la tierra tu rey (winner of the 2004 Sor Juana Inés de la Cruz Prize and translated into English as Your King No Longer Treads the Earth by W. Nick Hill)
- 2005: Alas (Trama Editorial)
- 2007: Coco (RBA)
- 2010: Los escarpines de Kristina de Noruega (Roca Editorial)
- 2010: El libro de Julieta (Editorial Grijalbo)
- 2014: Las Inviernas (published in 2016 in English translation as The Winterlings, translated by Samuel Ritter).
- 2015: 47 trocitos (Editorial Edebé)
- 2017: Alguien bajo los párpados (Editorial Anagrama)

=== Translations from English to Spanish ===
- 2005: Curdie y la Princesa, a translation of The Princess and Curdie by George MacDonald
- 2006: Cumbres Borrascosas, a translation of Emily Brontë's Wuthering Heights
- 2011: Puck de la colina de Pook, a translation of Rudyard Kipling's Puck of Pook's Hill
- 2015: Los chicos del ferrocarril, a translation of Edith Nesbit's The Railway Children
- 2017: Por qué este mundo. Una biografía de Clarice Lispector, a translation of Benjamin Moser's Why This World: A Biography of Clarice Lispector
