= Armando González Torres =

Mexican poet and essayist (born 1964)

Armando González Torres (Note: In this Mexican name, the surname is González and the second or maternal family name is Torres.) (born 1964) is a Mexican poet and essayist.

González Torres was born in Mexico City on 30 May 1964 and studied international relations at El Colegio de México. His articles have appeared in numerous newspapers and magazines, including Letras Libres, Nexos, Milenio and El Universal.

His works include the poetry collections La conversación ortodoxa, La sed de los cadáveres, Los días prolijos, Teoría de la afrenta and La peste, while his essays have been published in volumes including Las guerras culturales de Octavio Paz, ¡Que se mueran los intelectuales!, La pequeña tradición and La lectura y la sospecha.

He received the Gilberto Owen National Literature prize in 1995 (for La conversación ortodoxa) and the Alfonso Reyes National Essay Prize in 2001 (for Las guerras culturales de Octavio Paz).

González Torres was elected to the Mexican Academy of Language on 10 September 2026.
