= León Dujovne =

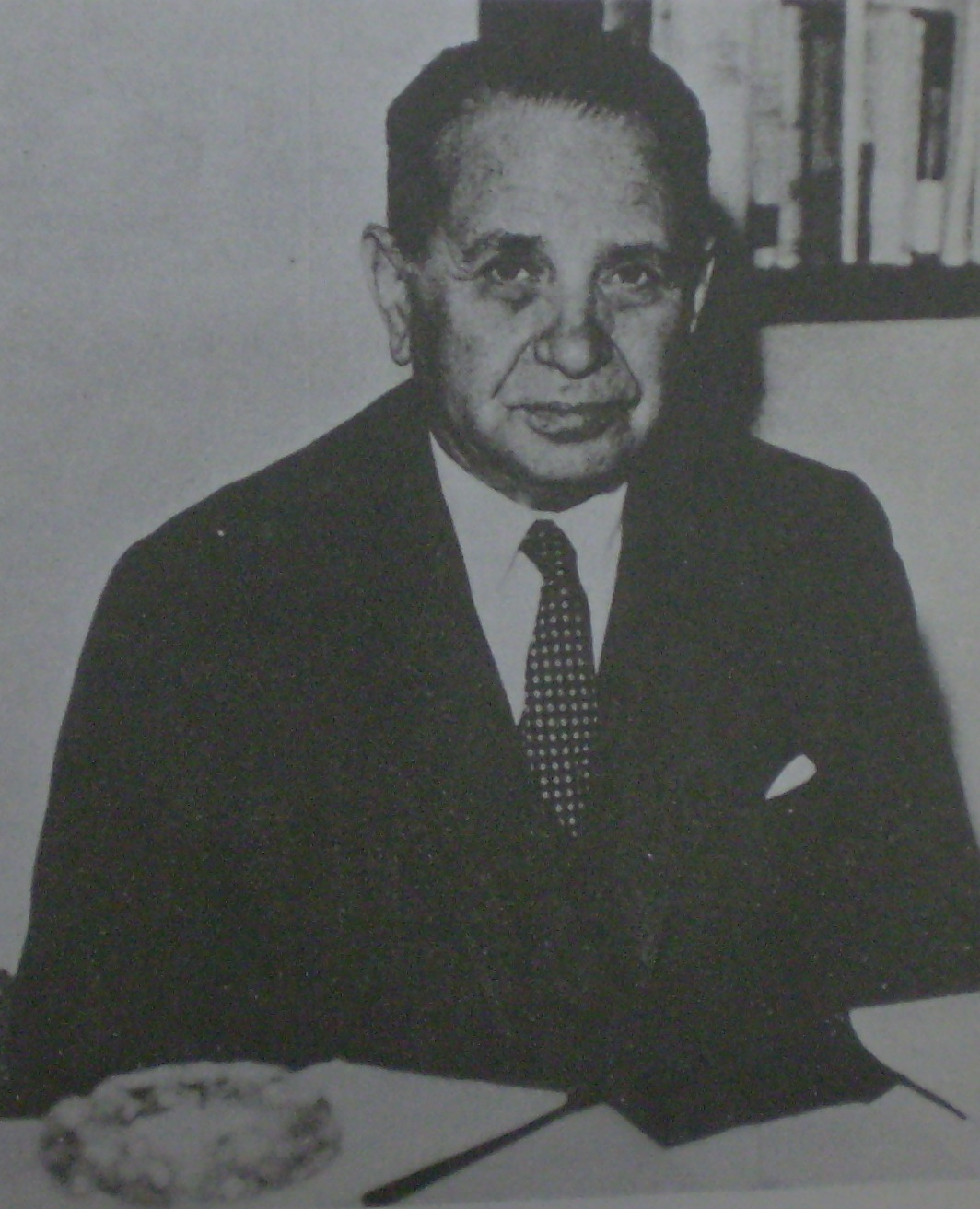
- León Dujovne in 1971.
- Born: 15 November 1898; Kurilovich, Russian Empire (present-day Ukraine)
- Died: 16 January 1984 (aged 85); Buenos Aires, Argentina

León Dujovne (15 November 1898 – 16 January 1984) was an Argentine writer, philosopher, essayist and journalist.

== Early life ==
Dujovne was born to Jewish parents in the village of Kurilovich, near the small town of Mohyliv-Podilskyi (Vinnytsia Oblast), on the border with Bessarabia (Moldova) in the Russian Empire. At the age of one, his parents emigrated to Argentina; the family settled in Basavilbaso, Entre Ríos, one of the several Jewish colonies founded by Baron Maurice de Hirsch in the province.

== Notable works ==
- Spinoza. Su vida, su época, su obra, su influencia, in 4 volumes. Buenos Aires: Facultad de Filosofía y Letras de la Universidad de Buenos Aires, 1941-1945.
- El judaísmo como cultura. Buenos Aires: Ediciones Nueva Presencia, 1980.
- Translation of Maimonides' The Guide for the Perplexed (as Guía de los perplejos), in 3 volumes, based in the French version of Salomon Munk. Buenos Aires, 1955. Revised edition with an introduction and notes by Angelina Muñiz-Huberman, Mexico City: Conaculta, 2001.
