= Ana García Bergua =

Mexican writer

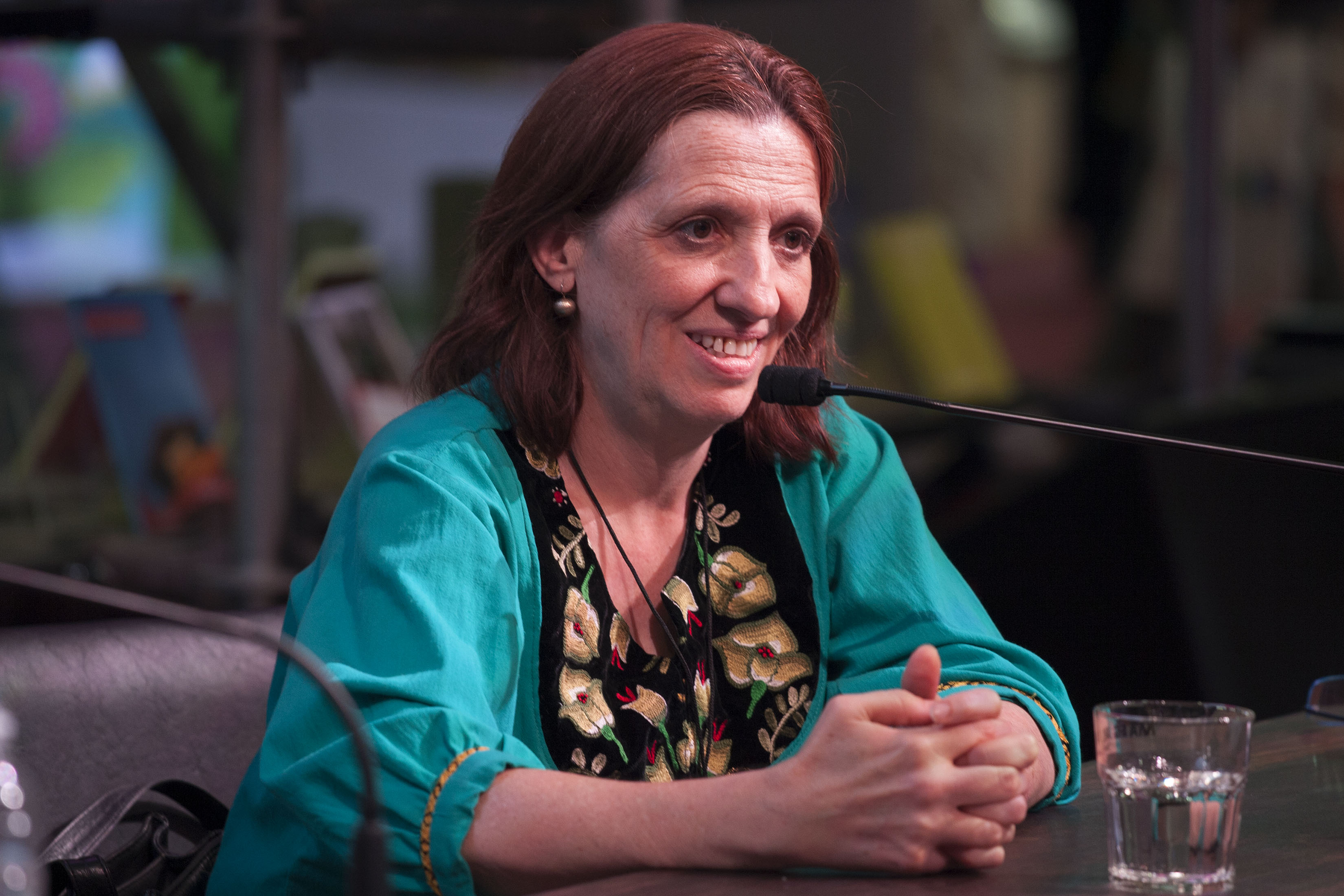
- Ana Garcia at the Buenos Aires International Book Fair in 2014
- Born: 1960 (age 65–66)
- Education: National Autonomous University of Mexico
- Occupation: Writer
- Writing career
- Language: Spanish
- Notable awards: Sor Juana Inés de la Cruz Prize (2013)

Ana García Bergua (Ciudad de México, 1960) is a Mexican writer. Born in Mexico City, in 1960, she studied French literature at the National Autonomous University of Mexico. She is the author of more than a dozen books, including El umbral, Púrpura, Rosas Negras and Islas de bobos. Her novel La bomba de San José won the Sor Juana Inés de la Cruz Prize in 2013. She is also known for the column "Y ahora paso a retirarme" (And now I will retire) which she wrote for La Jornada Semanal for several years.
