= Cristina Sánchez (molecular biologist) =

Spanish biologist

Dr. Cristina Sánchez is a Spanish molecular biologist.

She was born in Madrid, Spain in 1971.

She started her scientific career as an undergraduate student at the laboratory of Dr. Ramos and Dr. Fernández-Ruiz at the Complutense University of Madrid in 1994.

She obtained her PhD with Honors in Biochemistry and Molecular Biology at Complutense University in 2000 and went into postdoc studying the antitumoral and other properties of medical cannabis, especially cancer and the therapeutic qualities of cannabinoids.

She has been vocal about popularizing the healing apoptotic effect of cannabinoids on cannabinoid receptor containing cancer cells while leaving the healthy cannabinoid receptor containing cells be.
