= Francisco Tobar García =

Ecuadorian writer

- Born: November 3, 1928; Quito, Ecuador
- Died: February 1, 1997 (aged 68); Guayaquil, Ecuador
- Occupations: Writer, Diplomat

Francisco Tobar García (Quito, November 3, 1928 – Quito, February 1, 1997) was an Ecuadorian poet, playwright, short story writer, essayist, journalist, literary critic, diplomat and university professor.

He held a Ph.D. in Literature from the Pontifical Catholic University of Ecuador. He was a visiting professor at the National University of La Plata in Argentina, the Sorbonne in Paris, and the Complutense University of Madrid. He functioned as a diplomat for the Ecuadorian government in Spain, Haiti and Venezuela. He was also the director of the publishing division of the House of Ecuadorian Culture.

He died of lung cancer on February 1, 1997.

== Works ==
Poetry

- Amargo (Quito: Ed. Presencia, 1951)
- Segismundo y Zalatiel (Quito: Ed. Presencia, 1952)
- Naufragio y otros poemas (Quito: Ed. Casa de la Cultura, 1962)
- Dhanu (Madrid: Oficina de Educación Iberoamericana, 1978)
- Ebrio de eternidad (Quito: Ed. Banco Central de Ecuador, 1992)

Plays

- Tres piezas de teatro (Quito: Ed. Casa de la Cultura, 1962)
- Grandes comedias (Quito: Ed. Casa de la Cultura, 1981)

Novels

- Pares o nones (Madrid: Ed. Planeta, 1979) - winner of the Marbella Prize in Spain
- La corriente era libre (Bogotá: Ed. Paulinas, 1979)
- Autobiografía admirable de mi tía Eduvigis (Quito: Ed. El Conejo, 1991) - considered Francisco Tobar Garcia's masterpiece by critics

Short stories

- Los quiteños (Quito: Ed. Central de Publicaciones, 1991)
