= Silvia Molina =

Mexican author, playwright, editor, and essayist (born 1946)

Silvia Molina in 2023

Silvia Molina (born October 10, 1946, in Mexico City) is a Mexican author, playwright, editor, and essayist. She has written numerous novels, including La mañana debe seguir gris, which won a Xavier Villaurrutia Award in 1977, and El amor que me juraste, which earned a Sor Juana Inés de la Cruz Prize in 1998. In 2013 she was elected as a member of the Academia Mexicana de la Lengua.

== Early life and education ==
Silvia Molina is the daughter of Maria Celis and Héctor Pérez Martínez, who was also a writer. Molina's early life was spent in Mexico City (at the time known as the Mexican Federal District). She later studied Anthropology at the Escuela Nacional de Antropología e Historia (National School of Anthropology and History) the influence of this program can be seen in many of her works. A few years later in 1976, she participated in a writing workshop directed by Elena Poniatowska and Hugo Hiriart. While attending this workshop Molina produced her first novel, La mañana debe seguir gris, which was later translated into English as Gray Skies Tomorrow. After publishing her first book, she decided to attend National University in 1977, and this marked the beginning of her technical training as a writer.

== Selected bibliography ==
=== Novels ===
- La mañana debe seguir gris (1977), Grey Skies Tomorrow
- Ascensión Tun (1981)
- La familia vino del norte (1988)
- El hombre equivocado (coauthor) (1988)
- Imagen de Héctor (1990)
- El amor que me juraste (1998). The Love You Promised Me
- Muchacha azul (2001)
- En silencio, la lluvia (2008)
- Matamoros, el resplandor en la batalla (2010)
- En cuento: Lides de estaño (1984)
- Dicen que me case yo (1989)
- Silvia Molina. Material de Lectura (1990)
- Un hombre cerca (1992)
- En ensayo: Encuentros y reflexiones (1998)
- Recomenzar. Antología personal (1999)
- Cruzar la sombra (2012)

=== Children’s literature ===
- El papel (1985) y El algodón (1987)
- Los cuatro hermanos, Leyendas nahuas de la creación (1988)
- La creación del hombre, Leyendas nahuas de la creación (1991)
- La leyenda del sol y la luna (1991)
- Los tres corazones, Leyendas totonacas de la creación (1992)
- Las dos iguanas, Leyendas mayas de la creación (1993)
- Mi familia y la Bella Durmiente cien años después (1993)
- El abuelo ya no duerme en el armario (1996)
- El misterioso caso de la perra extraviada (1997)
- Marina y el pirata (1998)
- El topo y la codorniz (1999)
- Quiero ser la que seré (2000)
- Los gemelos y los dobles (2000)
- Las aventuras de don Sebas y campeona (2000)
- Mi abuelita tiene ruedas (2000)
- Martín, Martán fuera del gallinero (2003)
- Máscaras prehispánicas (2003)
- El diario de Sofía. La gesta histórica de la Batalla del 5 de mayo, narrada por una joven de la época (2003)
- Le comieron la lengua los ratones (2005)
- El canario y el sabueso (with illustrations by Ericka Martínez) (2006)
- Hasta el ratón y el gato pueden tener un buen trato (2006)
- ¡Pin pon, fuera y corre! Rimas de elección y juegos de recreo (2006)
- En estado de gol (2008)
- El abuelo ya no duerme en el armario (2009)
- Álbum de la patria. Campeche en el Bicentenario de la Independencia y el Centenario de la Revolución (2010)
- La jirafa Rafa (2010)
- Los vestidos de los dioses (2011)
- Rimas del tiempo (2011)
- La batalla del 5 de Mayo en el diario de Sofía (2012)
- María de los Álamos (2012)
- El zorro tramposo y el oso ingenioso (2012)
- Mi familia y la Bella Durmiente (2012)
