= Avinguda de Blasco Ibañez =

Street in Valencia, Spain

Coordinates: 39.4773°N 0.3591°W

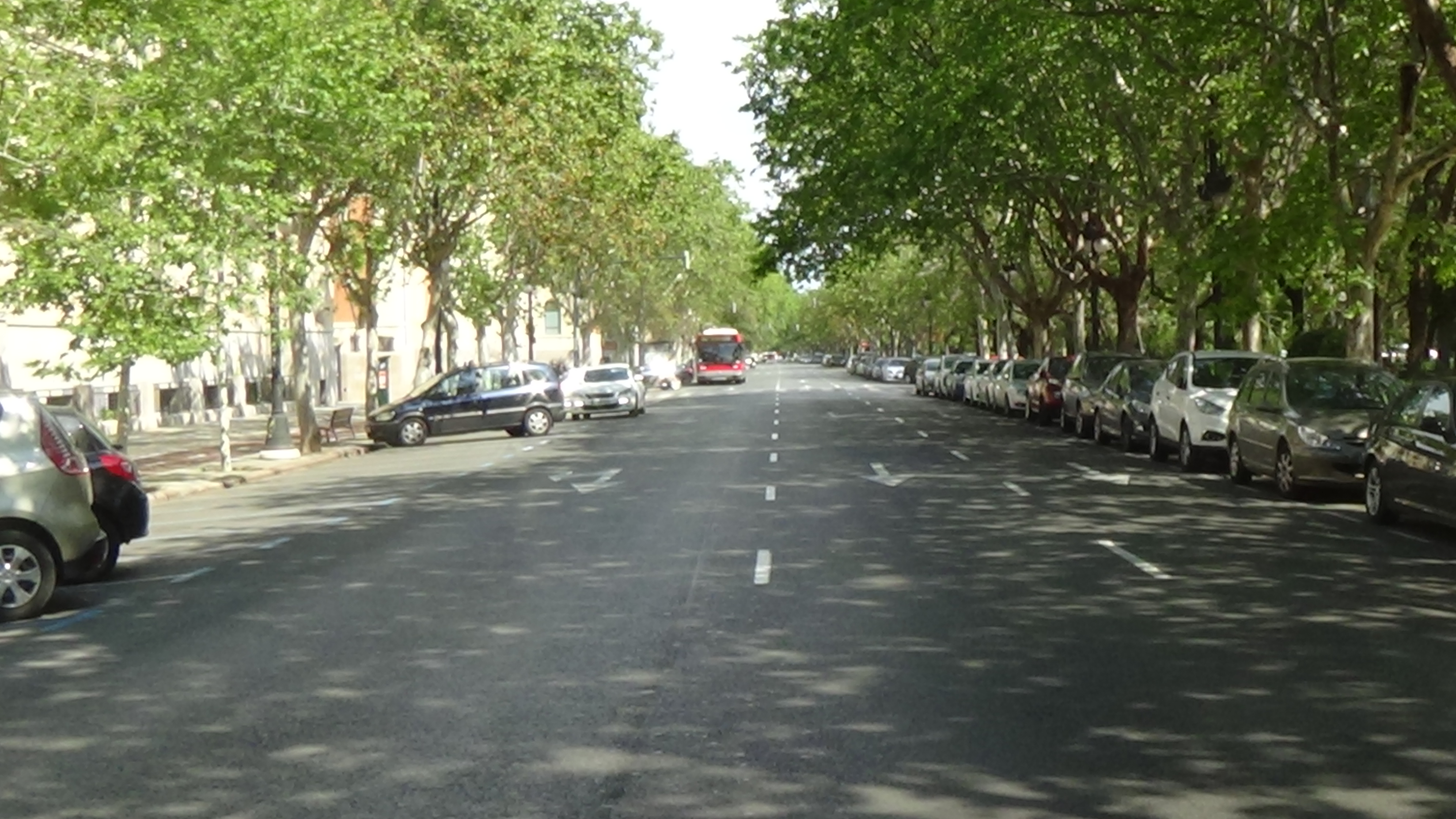
Avinguda de Blasco Ibáñez

The Avinguda de Blasco Ibañez is an avenue in the Spanish city of Valencia named after Spanish writer and journalist Vicente Blasco Ibáñez (1867 – 1928), who was originally from Valencia. The avenue leads from the Jardins del Real in the west to the Poblats Marítims in the east. Plans to extend the avenue to the sea have existed for a long time, but have not been realized.

== History ==
Originally envisioned as a jardin street under the name of "camino-paseo hasta el mar" the project was approved by law on 1 August 1893. The aim of the street was to link the Jardins del Real in the west to the Poblats Marítims in the east of the city. Finished in 1895, a first design was made by Casimiro Meseguer who intended to make the street part of a green city plan he called "Ciudad Jardín". It was made with the bourgeoisie in mind, with villas for the rich directly on the avenue and less expensive houses behind it. Meseguer's design gave the street a width of 100 meters and included three large plazas with a diameter of 200 meters. A central part of the street would be a 60-meter wide landscaped stretch, streets ending on the camino would have a width of 20 meters.

However, the plans were cancelled due to the projected high costs and the avenue was constructed differently. It became part of the growth of the city to the north-east and the sea and in line with the practice of ensanche. The first part of the Avenida has a 50-meter wide landscaped stretch. A second part, leading to the Avinguda de Catalnya, was finished in 1952. Construction on the third and currently final part started in 1972 and leads to the Cabanyal metro station. Although the avenue was constructed differently than originally designed, Meseguer's ideas, however, remained popular throughout the 20th-century and were defended by Vicente Blasco Ibáñez.

The Avinguda de Blasco Ibañez obtained its current name in 1977, previously it had been called calle número 141 del plano; Unión Soviética; Vía Triunfal; Paseo Valencia al Mar and Paseo al Mar.

== Extension to sea ==
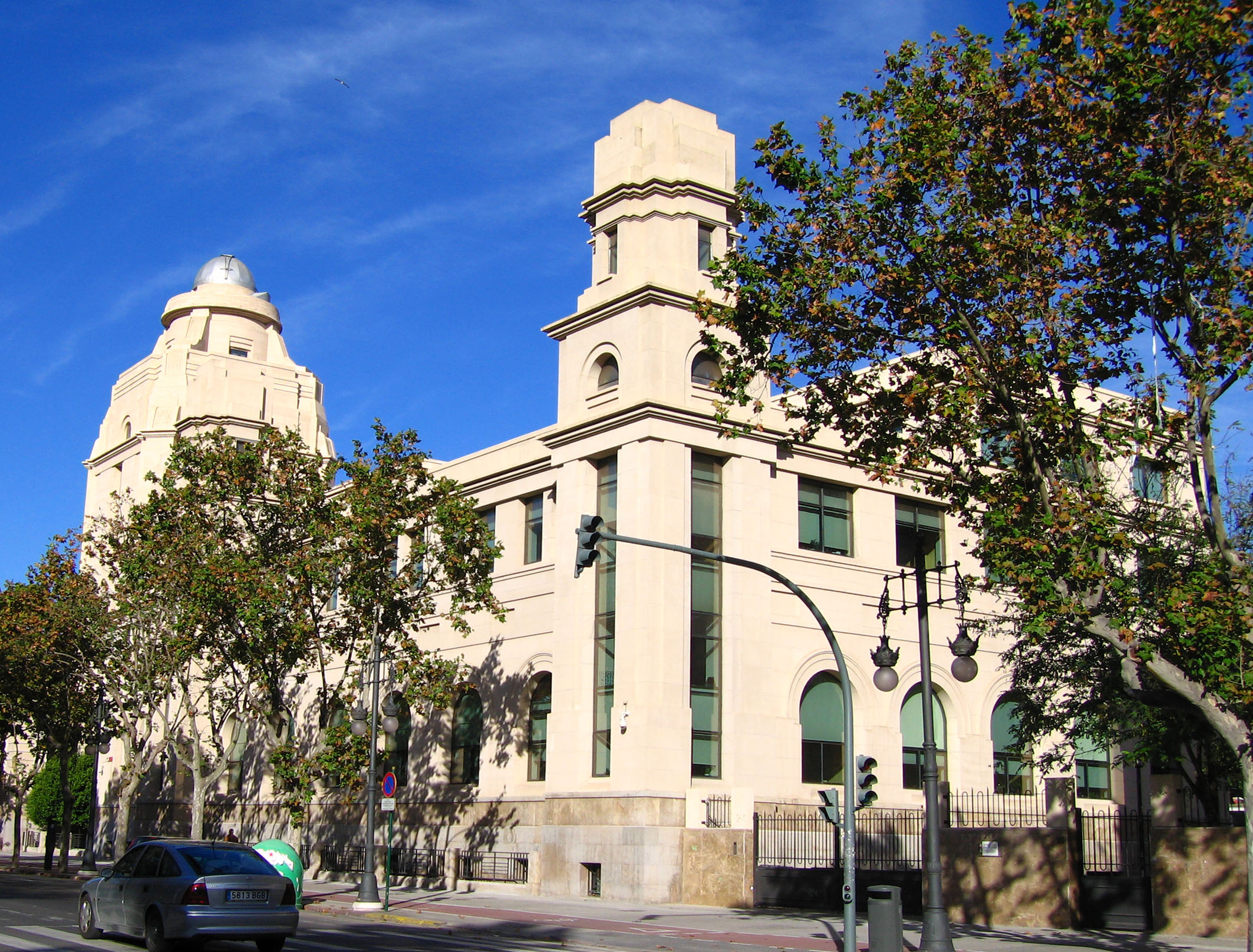
The University of Valencia's rectorate

Plans to extend the avenue to the sea have existed for decades but have not been realized. In 2010 the Spanish Ministry of Culture blocked the plans of the city of Valencia to extend the avenue and kept the protection of Bien de Interés Cultural of the Cabanyal neighborhood.

In 2014 Valencia mayor Rita Barberá announced that the Plan Especial de Protección y Reforma Interior (Pepri) del Cabanyal-Canyamelar would go on, including an expansion of the Avenida to the sea. The Pepri plan is controversial due to an expected destruction of homes in the Cabanyal neighborhood.

== Buildings ==
The University of Valencia has several of its faculties located on the Avinguda de Blasco Ibañez. Due to the presence of students the Avinguda de Blasco Ibañez is known as one of the nightlife areas of Valencia.
