= Humberto Blasco =

Paraguayan politician

Humberto Blasco was the Paraguayan Minister of Justice and Labor under President Fernando Lugo.
