= Eusebio Blasco =

Spanish journalist, poet and playwright

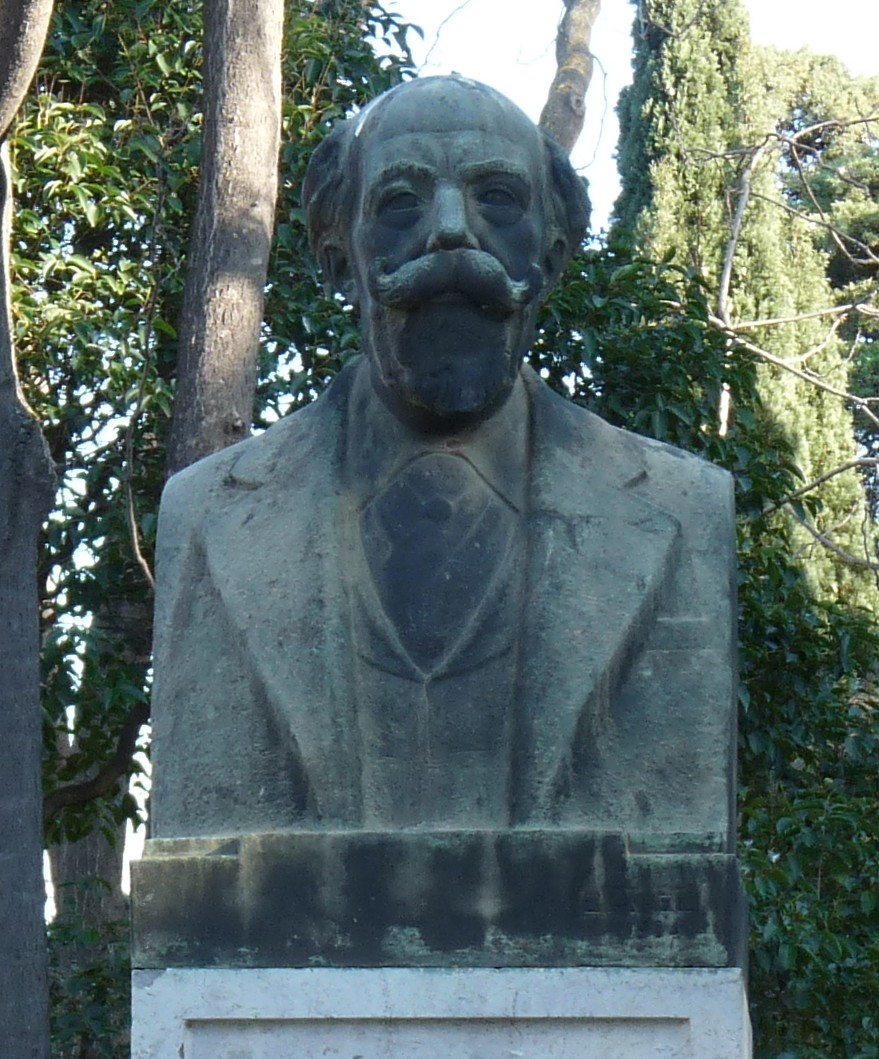
- Bust of Eusebio Blasco done by Enrique Anel in 1928, located in the Parque Grande in Zaragoza.
- Born: 1844
- Died: 1903 (aged 58–59)

Eusebio Blasco Soler (1844–1903) was a Spanish journalist, poet and playwright.
