= Academia Mexicana de la Lengua =

Language organization in Mexico

Mexican Academy of the Language Academia Mexicana de la Lengua
- Abbreviation: AML
- Formation: 1854
- Headquarters: Donceles 66, Mexico City, Mexico
- Region served: Mexico
- Members: 36
- Official language: Spanish
- Director: Gonzalo Celorio
- Main organ: Mesa Directiva
- Affiliations: Association of Spanish Language Academies
- Website: www.academia.org.mx

The Academia Mexicana de la Lengua (variously translated as the Mexican Academy of Language, the Mexican Academy of the Language, the Mexican Academy of Letters, or glossed as the Mexican Academy of the Spanish Language; acronym AML) is the correspondent academy in Mexico of the Royal Spanish Academy. It was founded in Mexico City on 11 September 1875 and, like the other academies, has the principal function of working to ensure the purity of the Spanish language. Academy members have included many of the leading figures in Mexican letters, including philologists, grammarians, philosophers, novelists, poets, historians and humanists.

The Academia Mexicana organized the first Congress of the Spanish Language Academies, celebrated at Mexico City in April 1951. This gave birth, through its Permanent Commission, to the Association of Spanish Language Academies, confirmed in the second Congress, celebrated in Madrid in 1956.

== Objectives ==
According to its statutes, approved in the plenary session of 2 December 1931, and what is disposed in the text of constitution as a civil association from 1952, the objectives of the Academy are as follows:

1. To watch over the conservation, the purity and the improvement of the Spanish language.
2. To keep constant communication of scientific or literary nature with the similar academies and institutions.
3. To form and increase its library, especially with those scientific and literary works that best favor the achievements of the purposes of the Academia.
4. To promote and propagate the study of the Spanish language though periodic private sessions; public sessions and conferences; congresses and any other acts typical of the institute, being able to send delegates from its heart to achieve this ends.
5. To attend consultations by public institutions and private individuals.
6. To promote before the authorities or institutions or private individuals all that favors the conservation, the purity and the improvement of the Castilian language.

To achieve its objectives, the Academy takes abroad several studies and activities related to its competence, in plenary form as well as though its assigned especialized commissions.

== Composition and operation ==
Originally, the Academy began its work with 13 of the 18 numerary members it was authorized to have under Real Academia Española rules. Today, following statutory reforms in 1952 and 2006, it has 36 full members (académicos de número) and up to 36 correspondent members (académicos correspondientes) based outside Mexico City. It may also have up to an additional five honorary members (académicos honorarios), who may be either Mexican citizens or foreigners.

It has a Board made up by a Director, a Secretary, a Censor, a Librarian-Archivist and a Treasurer, all chosen among the académicos de número by absolute majority of votes from the academics that attend the session in which they are to be elected, in secret voting.

The labour of the Academy is performed in a meeting, that celebrates its sessions twice or more monthly. The sessions are private or public, the first ones can be ordinary or extraordinary, and the public ones have the characteristic of solemnity when the Academy agrees it. The nature of the jobs that are analyzed and discussed in the heart of the meeting are of lexicographic, linguistic and literary importance.

The Academy owns a wide library, named the Biblioteca Alberto María Carreño in honor of a prominent academic, which was consolidated in 1959 once the Academy had a permanent headquarters. Its initial fund comes from the former private library of the academic Don Alejandro Quijano, purchased by the government of President Adolfo López Mateos through the efforts of academic Don Jaime Torres Bodet, then Secretary of Public Education, and ceded to the institution. With the years the number of works with relevant contributions has been growing through donations, including that of the prestigious jurist and intellectual Alberto Vázquez del Mercado (1893–1980). In addition to books donated by the academics, there are to be found those sent by the Real Academia Española, the other Spanish-language academies, some publishing companies and book stores, as well as those sent by official and private cultural organizations.

== Activities and projects ==
From its creation, the work of the academy has been documented with the publication of the Memories and a Yearbook.

In the Memories appear the works read by the members of the Academy in the meetings and others that, according to their judgement, are worth of publishing. Each volume starts with a review of the most relevant happenings that have occurred since the publication of the previous one and the indication of the number of attendance to the meetings of each academic, and concludes with general and alphabetic indexes.

The Academy publishes a Yearbook where it communicates the changes in academics and also all sort of works related to the institute.

Likewise, it is concerned with the research of the use of the Spanish language in Mexico, which has crystallized in the publication of different works of reference. Among them, the most important are:

- The Universal Dictionary of Geography (Diccionario geográfico universal, 1997), that contains the names in Spanish of several geographical entities from around the world and their demonyms. It includes, for information purposes, the names in the language or languages of the country they are talking about, if they are normally written in Latin alphabet, or Latinized if in their region it is used a different writing system.
- The Mexican Book of Sayings (Refranero mexicano, 2004), that has its origins in an extensive project that the Academy started to commemorate its 125th anniversary. After some hard work, they finally published the Index of Mexicanisms (Índice de mexicanismos, 1997), co-published with the Fondo de Cultura Económica, a wide collection of sayings used in Mexico from the beginnings of the 19th century until nowadays and that has become a fundamental reference book to the study of the Spanish spoken in the country. This Index generated two works: the Short Dictionary of Mexicanisms (Diccionario breve de mexicanismos, 2001), with 6,200 lexicographical articles that include words, phrases and even certain lexical elements, by Guido Gómez de Silva, and the Mexican Book of Sayings (Refranero mexicano), product of the work of several Academic researches.

Because of its vocation of constantly adaptation with the new technologies and in harmony with the new communications society, the Academia Mexicana de la Lengua has included the forementioned works in its webpage so that they can be consulted in an interactive manner, belonging to the Association of Spanish Language Academies.

== See also ==
- List of members of the Mexican Academy of Language
