= 1979 Pan American Games =

8th edition of the Pan American Games

VIII Pan American Games
- Host: San Juan, Puerto Rico
- Nations: 34
- Athletes: 3,700
- Events: 250 in 24 sports
- Opening: July 1
- Closing: July 15
- Opened by: Governor Carlos Romero Barceló
- Cauldron lighter: Cynthia Guadalupe
- Main venue: Hiram Bithorn Stadium

The 1979 Pan American Games, officially the VIII Pan American Games (Spanish: VIII Juegos Panamericanos) and commonly known as San Juan 1979, were a multi-sport event governed by the Panam Sports Organization (PASO), and were held in San Juan, Puerto Rico, from July 1 to July 15, 1979. Volleyball and some baseball matches were held in Caguas, Puerto Rico. The 1980 documentary film A Step Away showcased a number of athletes competing in the Games.

== Bidding process ==
On May 31, 1973, San Juan was the only candidate city to be a finalist to host the games and thus, San Juan was then selected to host the VIII Pan American Games by PASO at its general assembly in Santiago, Chile.

== Organization ==
The use of the Puerto Rican flag and anthem over those of the United States became a point of contention between the COPUR and the administration. As mayor of San Juan, then-Governor Carlos Romero Barceló had been involved in the organization process, but as soon as he took office demanded that the flag of Puerto Rico could only be used if accompanied by that of the United States and that both anthems were to be played. Pushback came from sports leaders led by Germán Rieckehoff, who noted that it was against IOC rules, while civilian groups backed their stance. The Asociación de Atletas y Deportistas de Puerto Rico emerged as an educational tool against the administration. Romero hosted the opening ceremony and coordinated for both anthems to be played, being jeered himself and witnessing the booing of the American anthem in what became known as "La Pitada Olímpica". In 1980 a documentary titled A Step Away covered the organization of the event.

== The Games ==
=== Sports ===
- Archery
- Athletics
- Baseball
- Basketball
- Boxing
- Cycling
- Diving
- Equestrian
- Fencing
- Field hockey
- Football
- Gymnastics
- Judo
- Roller sports
- Rowing
- Sailing
- Shooting
- Softball
- Swimming
- Synchronized swimming
- Table tennis
- Tennis
- Volleyball
- Weightlifting
- Wrestling

=== Medal count ===
Rank	Nation	Gold	Silver	Bronze	Total
1	United States	126	95	45	266
2	Cuba	64	47	34	145
3	Canada	24	43	71	138
4	Argentina	12	7	17	36
5	Brazil	9	13	17	39
Totals (5 entries)		235	205	184	624

Note

The medal count for Canada is disputed.

=== Mascot ===
Coqui, the first Pan American Games mascot

The 1979 Games were the first one to feature a mascot, which was a running frog holding a torch named Coqui.

Preceded by Mexico City	VIII Pan American Games; San Juan (1979)	Succeeded by Caracas
