= Nicolás Brizuela =

Argentinian musician (1949–2020)

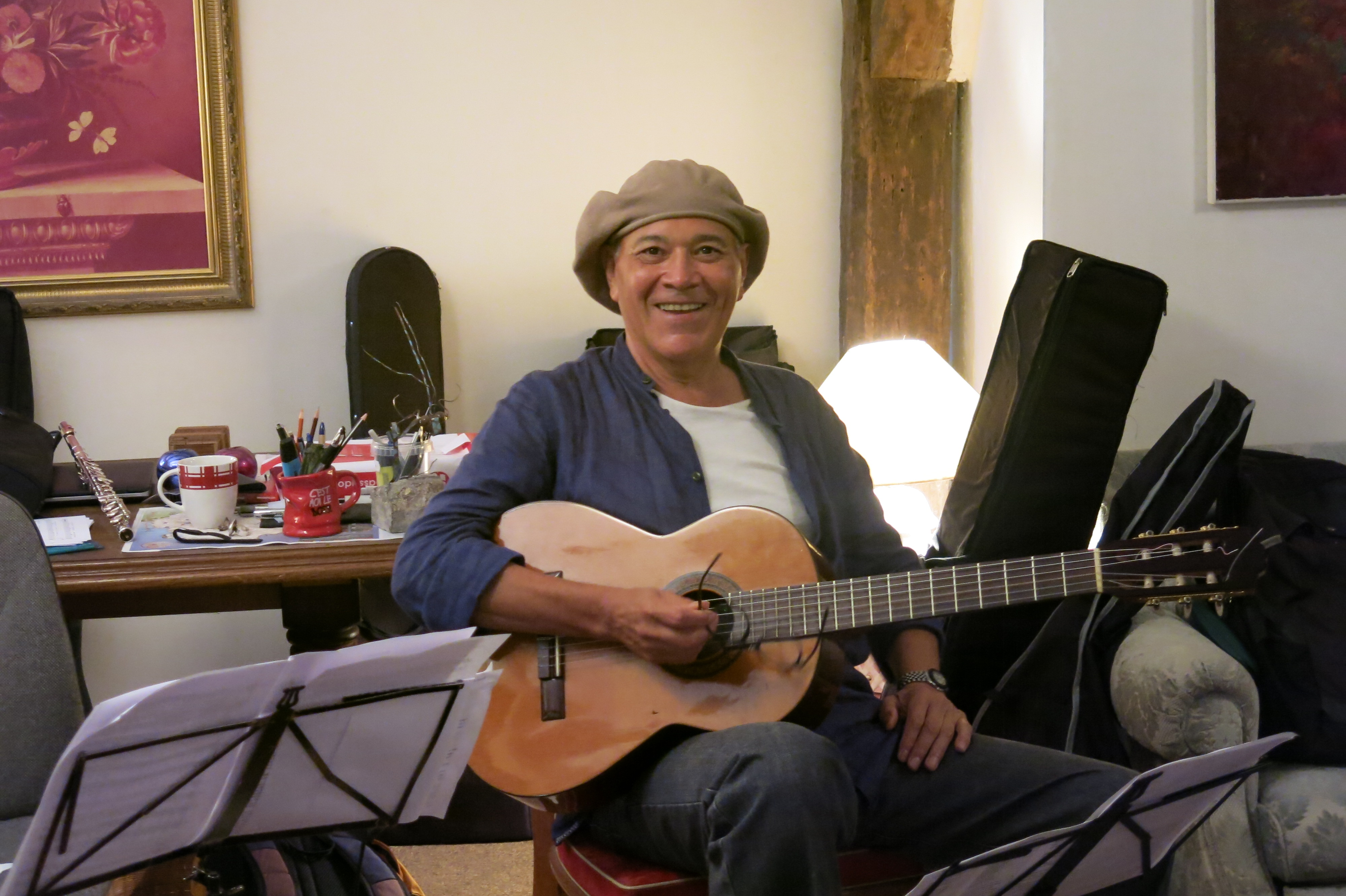
- Nicolás Brizuela in 2017
- Born: 23 December 1949; La Rioja, Argentina
- Died: 28 March 2020 (aged 70); Buenos Aires, Argentina
- Occupation: Musician

Nicolás Brizuela (23 December 1949 – 28 March 2020) was an Argentinian musician and guitarist.

== Biography ==
A native of La Rioja, Brizuela moved to Buenos Aires at the age of 17. A self-taught guitarist, he learned music with his brothers before arriving in the Argentinian capital. He studied classical guitar, and Rodolfo Mederos described him as "a sensitive musician and an expert in the secrets of musical language". He collaborated with singers Horacio Guarany and Rubén Juárez until 1975.

Brizuela collaborated with singer Mercedes Sosa on her 1977 album "Mercedes Sosa interpreta a Atahualpa Yupanqui". Due to a military dictatorship at the time, Sosa and Brizuela were arrested during a concert in La Plata in 1978. The two were extradited to France the following year, and spent a year and a half in Paris. They continued to perform across Europe, and sold out in 10 performances at the Théâtre de la Ville in Paris. Brizuela returned to Argentina in 1980 and worked as a studio musician.

In 1983, Brizuela and Sosa resumed their collaboration. They toured in various concert halls across the globe, including Carnegie Hall, Royal Festival Hall, Madison Square Garden, Lincoln Center, Olympia, Théâtre de la Ville, Gasteig, and others. In the 1990s, the two toured Europe alongside Joan Baez and Konstantin Wecker. In 2004, Brizuela and Sosa performed at the Teatro Colón in Buenos Aires with Martha Argerich. In total, the duo of Sosa and Brizuela recorded 27 albums and an acoustic DVD.

In 2001, Brizuela recorded Tangos in duet with Rodolfo Mederos. The album was well-received, with newspaper La Nacíon explaining: "It is rarely given to us to drown in the secrets of the melody and harmony of a tango or a milonga thanks to the phased filled with emotions. Mederos and Brizuela give us this unique opportunity. In its folds is housed the magic of the glorious tango of Buenos Aires". In 2005, Mederos and Brizuela recorded a follow-up album, titled Tango 12. In 2009, Brizuela recorded a tribute to Bill Evans, which became part of the album Nos volveremos a ver. In 2011, he recorded an album with Dino Saluzzi. Brizuela made several stays in France between 2012 and 2017 and played in many performances at places like Abbaye de Boschaud in Périgord.

Nicolás Brizuela died on 28 March 2020 at the age of 70.
