= Raúl Dávila =

Puerto Rican actor

- Born: September 15, 1931; San Juan, Puerto Rico
- Died: January 2, 2006 (aged 74); Newark, New Jersey

Raúl Dávila (September 15, 1931 – January 2, 2006) was an actor, who is best remembered in the United States for his role of Hector Santos in the American soap opera All My Children. In his home country of Puerto Rico, he is perhaps better remembered as the titular "Carmelo" of the hit WAPA-TV sitcom, "Carmelo y Punto". Dávila directed La Morena: The Dark One, which gained recognition off-off-Broadway. As a translator, he adapted Barefoot in the park and Gigi. As an activist, Dávila worked with SAG and HOLA.

== Early years ==
Dávila was born in San Juan, Puerto Rico where he received his primary and secondary education. After graduating from high school, he enrolled in the University of Puerto Rico where he studied dramatic arts. He continued his education at Tulane University in New Orleans, Louisiana and then earned his master's degree in Dramatic Arts from California's Pasadena Playhouse. He was married to Isabel Dávila, with whom he had three children.

== Acting debut ==
In 1957, Dávila began his acting career in Puerto Rico's Telemundo television station. He worked in over 20 locally produced soap operas alongside the likes of Braulio Castillo and Mario Pabon. After six years with Telemundo, Dávila decided to try his luck in the United States and moved to New York City.

== Acting in the United States ==
He arrived in the city on November 23, 1963, the day after President John F. Kennedy was assassinated. At first it was difficult for Dávila to find work as an actor, since in the 1960s there wasn't much of a demand for Hispanic actors. With the help of fellow Puerto Ricans Raúl Juliá and Míriam Colón, he was able to find work in a Spanish Language television station program called "Tribuna Hispana" (Hispanic Tribune) which was followed by "Mundo Latino" (Latino World), "De tú a tú con Raúl", "Realidades" (Reality) and "The Puerto Rican New Yorker". Dávila appeared along Juliá in La Vida es un Sueño. He went in to appear in other plays like Yerma, Bodas de Sangre, South Pacific and Kiss me Kate. Dávila received ACE awards for his performance for El Díario de Anna Frank.

Dávila presided over the Hispanic Organization of Latin Actors, also known as HOLA, an organization to which actor Raúl Juliá lent his support. The organizations goal is to celebrate Latino achievements in the field of entertainment. Dávila began making appearances on some of the popular T.V. shows of the day, such as The Patty Duke Show, The Defenders and East Side. He also landed small roles in the movies The Man with My Face, Counterplot and Felicia. Besides those small roles he supported himself by making commercials for Campbell's Soup, Colgate and The New York Telephone Co.

As early as 1964, his acting talents were showcased on the CBS Television network in collaboration with the conductor Alfredo Antonini, in an episode of the CBS Repertoire Workshop- "Feliz Borinquen" playing himself.

In 1974, he played the lead role in Luis Rafael Sánchez' presentation of "O casi el alma", both in Spanish and English.

Throughout his career, Dávila was active in Puerto Rico, collaborating with telenovela El derecho de nacer and comedy Carmelo y punto. In 1985, Dávila returned to the island to film La Gran Fiesta, a film produced and directed by Marcos Zurinaga. In 1987, he made his official movie debut in the United States, in the film The Believers alongside actor Martin Sheen. Dávila was also involved in Puerto Rican film La guagua aérea (1991). In the states, Dávila also participated in the following soap operas: Guiding Light, The Doctors One Life to Live and All My Children, where he played the role of Hector Santos for four years.

== Later years ==
Dávila lived in New Jersey, but he traveled constantly between New Jersey and Puerto Rico. In Puerto Rico, he played the lead role in the television comedy Carmelo y Punto. He also acted in three locally produced films, Linda Sara (with Chayanne and Dayanara Torres), Milagro en Yauco and Los Diaz de Doris. During his final years, Dávila was afflicted with diabetes.

Raúl Dávila died on January 2, 2006, at his home in Newark, New Jersey from a heart attack. On January 6, 2006, New York Democratic Congressman José Serrano released a statement to be submitted to the Congressional Record honoring Dávila.

== Theater ==
Dávila spent most of the decade of the 70's doing theater. Among the many productions in which he worked were:

- Bodas de Sangra - Leonardo
- Yerma - Juan
- Tonight or Never - Franz
- South Pacific - The Professor
- Kiss me Kate - Hortensio
- La vida es un sueño - Segismundo
- The King and I - The King
- The Sun looks Down - Anselmo
- The Sound of Music - Captain Von Trapp
- La Viliza - Osvaldo
- Quién le teme a Virginia Wolf?

== Filmography ==
- 1959: Counterplot - Messenger
- 1965: The Patty Duke Show (TV Series) - Carlos
- 1965: Heroína - Judge
- 1966: El Escuadrón del pánico
- 1984: A Doctor's Story (TV Movie) - Jack Angel
- 1985: Private Sessions (TV Movie) - Mr. Fontana
- 1985: La Gran Fiesta - Don Miguel de la Torre
- 1986: Florida Straits (TV Movie) - Esteban
- 1987: The Believers - Oscar Sezine
- 1988: The Trial of Bernhard Goetz (TV Series) - Flores
- 1990: The Old Man and the Sea (TV Movie)
- 1991: Fires Within - Reuben
- 1991: Camelo y Punto (TV Movie) - Camelo
- 1992: Le Grand pardon II - Emilio Esteban
- 1993: La guagua aérea - Ernesto
- 1994: Law & Order (Episode: "Coma") - Camacho
- 1994: New York Undercover (Episode: "Missing" November 3) - Martinez
- 1994: Linda Sara - Doctor Baez
- 1994-1998: All My Children (TV Series) - Hector Santos
- 1999: Los Diaz de Doris - Rodolfo
- 2005: Fuego en el alma - (final film role)

== See also ==
- List of Puerto Ricans
