= Jaime Sánchez (actor) =

Puerto Rican stage and screen actor (born 1938)

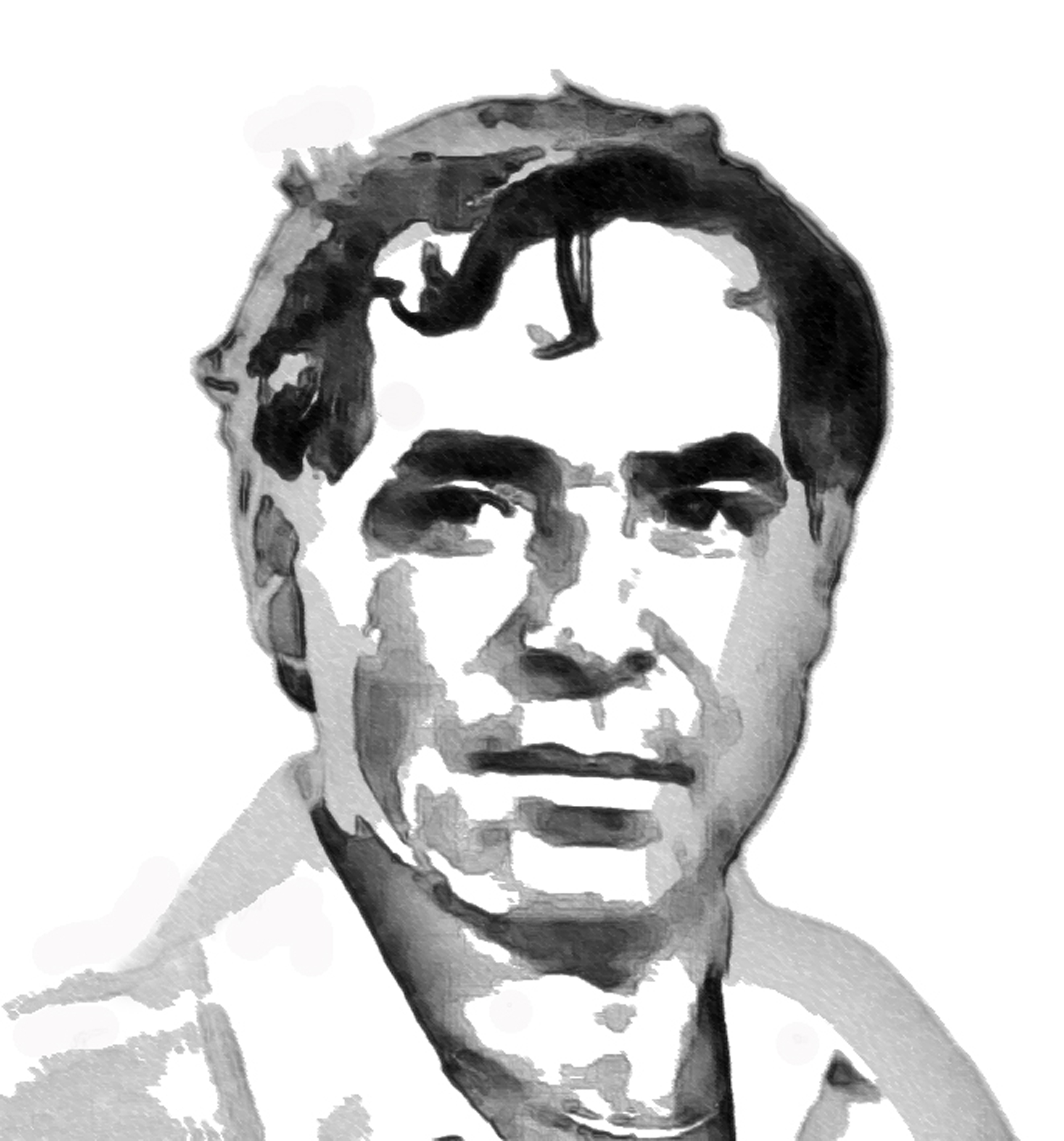
- Born: Jaime Luis Sánchez Rodríguez; December 19, 1938 (age 87); Rincón, Puerto Rico
- Occupation: Actor
- Years active: 1962-2011

Jaime Luis Sánchez Rodríguez (born December 19, 1938) is a Puerto Rican actor of stage, film and television, active since the 1950s. He began his acting career on Broadway at the age of 18 in 1957, when he played Chino in the original cast of West Side Story. Sánchez gathered fame for his role and became established in the entertainment industry, continuing to perform on stage, television and film.

== Career ==
=== Stage ===
Jaime Luis Sánchez Rodríguez, appearing as Jamie Sanchez, was born in the coastal municipality of Rincón. His household was poor, and he was one of seven siblings (four brothers and three sisters) had to figure ways in which to sustain themselves and the family. He was a noted follower of José Ferrer. Sánchez's parents were not particularly interested in the arts but did support his ambitions of becoming an actor. Listening to radio novels in Puerto Rico inspired Sánchez, as did the trio of Lucy Boscana, Edmundo Rivera and Madeline Williamsen. By the age of 14, he had begun performing as a radio actor. At the time, there was little platform for theater and cinema in the municipality. However, after beginning high school at Aguada he was encouraged by a teacher to participate in theater and poetry.

Upon arriving to New York, Sánchez studied and moonlighted by cleaning dishes. While working at the Joward Johnson Hotel six months later, he encountered Larry Fuller and was recruited for West Side Story. Sánchez auditioned along 300 candidates and was accepted for the role of "Chino", which he performed for two years. He considered the play a learning experience that helped throughout his career. During this time, Sánchez studied under Wynn Handman and later joined Lee Strasberg's Actor's Studio.

Due to the existence of a Puerto Rican diaspora and an overall connection to the island, Sánchez preferred to stay in New York and perform in local theater instead of moving to Hollywood. He continued visiting the island at least twice a year to visit his family. Sánchez also performed in numerous off-Broadway theater productions, including an appearance as Marc Antony in Joseph Papp's 1979 production of William Shakespeare's Julius Caesar and in an adaptation of King Lear.

=== Screen ===
Film

Sánchez' film appearances include Frank Perry's drama David and Lisa (1962), Sidney Lumet's drama The Pawnbroker (1964), Cornel Wilde's World War II film Beach Red (1967) and Sam Peckinpah's western The Wild Bunch (1969). He also had two different roles in both Brian De Palma's crime drama Carlito's Way (1993) and its 2005 prequel Carlito's Way: Rise to Power, directed by Michael Bregman. He plays the role of Miguel's Father in Leon Ichaso's biopic Piñero (2001), about the Puerto Rican playwright/actor Miguel Piñero (whom he knew personally) played by Benjamin Bratt. Sánchez also appeared in the films Bobby Deerfield, Florida Straits, In the Soup (1992), Bad Lieutenant (1992), Heroína, Nuestro Regimiento, 3 Americas (2007) and El Cantante (2008).

Television

On television, Sánchez has appeared on shows such as The Fugitive (1966), Bonanza (1970), Kojak (1974, 1976), Miami Vice (1985), The Equalizer (1986), Law & Order (1992),NYPD Blue, and the second season of Sesame Street, in which he appeared as Miguel in 1971.

Sánchez also made appearances in television films, such as David Lowell Rich's action-drama Wings of Fire (1967), Mike Hodges's action-adventure Florida Straits (1986), and Kojak: It's Always Something (1990).

At Puerto Rico, Sánchez worked with Jacobo Morales and Miguel Ángel Álvarez. While working in Pawnbroker, Sánchez was impressed with the work of Juano Hernández and Rod Steiger. The work done by Raúl Juliá also earned his attention, despite not working together in a film. Sánchez reunited with Jerome Robbins in Old Dad Poor Dad, Mama Hang you in the Closet and I'm Getting so Sad. Later in life, Sánchez noted his belief that it was easier for a Latin American actor to be cast in the 1950s-60s (due to a lack of competition), but that the stereotypes had lived well into the modern era and still limits roles.

== Honors ==
Sánchez received the Screen World Award and was nominated for a Laurel Award for his performance in The Wild Bunch (1969). In 2002, Sánchez received the HOLA Lifetime Achievement Award from the Hispanic Organization of Latin Actors (HOLA).

In 2008, Jaime Sánchez was invited and honored by the Bar Association of Puerto Rico (Colegio de Abogados de Puerto Rico), in an event that also honored pioneer actor Juano Hernández posthumously.

== Filmography ==
=== Film ===
- 1962: David and Lisa (Frank Perry) - Carlos
- 1964: The Pawnbroker (Sidney Lumet) - Jesus Ortiz
- 1965: Heroina (Jeronimo Mitchell Melendez) - Chico
- 1967: Beach Red (Cornel Wilde) - Colombo
- 1969: The Wild Bunch (Sam Peckinpah) - Angel
- 1969: El escuadrón del pánico (Nuestro Regimiento) (Manuel Mur Oti)
- 1970: Arocho y Clemente (Miguel Ángel Álvarez) - Arocho
- 1971: La Palomilla (Efrain Lopez Neris)
- 1973: Serpico (Sidney Lumet) - Cop (uncredited)
- 1974: The Minutes and Hours (Frany Sardou)
- 1976: The Next Man (Richard C. Sarafian) - New York security
- 1977: Bobby Deerfield (Sydney Pollack) - Delveccio
- 1980: On the Nickel (Ralph Waite) - Joe
- 1985: Invasion USA (Joseph Zito) - Castillo
- 1986: Big Trouble (John Cassavetes) - Terrorist chief
- 1992: In the Soup (Alexandre Rockwell) - Uncle Theo
- 1992: Bad Lieutenant (Abel Ferrara) - Priest
- 1993: Carlito's Way (Brian De Palma) - Rudy
- 1995: Fear of Man (Short, William Nunez) - The patrol leader
- 1996: Looking for Richard (Documentary, Al Pacino) - Himself
- 1998: The City (La Ciudad) (David Riker) - The director of the clothing store
- 2001: Piñero (Leon Ichaso) - Miguel's father
- 2005: The Krutch (Short, 29m, Judith R. Escalona) - Dr. Guzman
- 2007: 3 Americas (Cristina Kotz Cornejo) - Henry
- 2011: The King Hector Lavoe (Antony Felton) - Hector Maisonave
- 2011: Diega! (James Aviles Martin) - Guillermo Diego
- In production : An Artist's Emblem (Michael J. Narvaez) - Paco the activist

=== Television ===
ACTOR television credits
| Year | Title | Role | Notes | Ref. |
|---|---|---|---|---|
| 1966 | The Fugitive | Sam | Episode: "The Last Oasis" | |
| 1967 | Wings of Fire | Luis Passos | TV movie. AKA The Cloudburst | |
| 1970 | Bonanza | Ramon Cardenas | Episode: "El Jefe" | |
| 1971 | Sesame Street | Miguel | 4 episodes | |
| 1974 | Kojak | Paolo Olivarez | Episode: "A Souvenir from Atlantic City" | |
| 1976 | Kojak | Thomas Serio | Episode: "An Unfair Trade" | |
| 1985 | Miami Vice | Grocero | Episode: "Smuggler's Blues" | |
| 1986 | American Playhouse | Ramon Iglesia | Episode: "The House of Ramon Iglesia" (S5.E10) | |
| 1986 | The Equalizer | Captain Vincente | Episode: "Prelude" | |
| 1986 | Florida Straits | Innocente | TV movie. Director: Mike Hodges | |
| 1990 | Kojak: It's Always Something | Dr. Claudio Guzman | TV movie | |
| 1992 | Law & Order | Mr. Cristobal | Episode: "Prince of Darkness" | |
| 2005 | Carlito's Way: Rise to Power | Eddie | TV movie. Director: Michael Bregman | |
