= La gran fiesta =

1985 film by Marcos Zurinaga

- Film poster
- Directed by: Marcos Zurinaga
- Written by: Ana Lydia Vega; Marcos Zurinaga
- Produced by: Roberto Gándara; Marcos Zurinaga
- Starring: Daniel Lugo; Cordelia González; Raúl Juliá; Miguel Ángel Suárez; Laura Delano; Fernando Quiñones; Raúl Dávila; E.G. Marshall
- Distributed by: Moreno Films
- Release date: 1985
- Running time: 101 minutes
- Language: Spanish

La gran fiesta (in English, The Great Party) is a 1985 Puerto Rican drama film, written and directed by Marcos Zurinaga, based on a story by Ana Lydia Vega. The film was selected as the Puerto Rican entry for the Best Foreign Language Film at the 59th Academy Awards, but was not accepted as a nominee.

The film chronicles the celebration of the last high-class party held at the Antiguo Casino de Puerto Rico before it was handed down to the United States military.

== Cast ==
- Daniel Lugo as José Manuel
- Cordelia González as Raquel
- Miguel Ángel Suárez as Vázquez
- Luis Prendes as Don Manuel González
- Laura Delano as Rita Inés
- Raúl David as Don Miguel de la Torre
- Carlos Cestero as Ángel Luis
- Ivonne Coll as Doña Tula
- Maruja Mas as Doña Tere
- Sully Diaz as Mari Tere
- Raúl Juliá as Adolfo
- Julián Pastor as Don Antonio Jiménez
- Guy Paizy as Henry Berger
- Fernando Quiñones as Luis Muñoz Marín
- E.G. Marshall as Judge Cooper
- Raúl Carbonell as M.C.
- David Ortiz Angleró as The Narrator

== See also ==
- Cinema of Puerto Rico
- List of films set in Puerto Rico
- List of submissions to the 59th Academy Awards for Best Foreign Language Film
- List of Puerto Rican submissions for the Academy Award for Best Foreign Language Film
