= Tango Bar =

1988 film

- Directed by: Marcos Zurinaga
- Written by: José Pablo Feinmann; Juan Carlos Codazzi; Marcos Zurinaga
- Produced by: Roberto Gándara; Marcos Zurinaga
- Starring: Raul Julia; Rubén Juárez; Valeria Lynch
- Cinematography: Marcos Zurinaga
- Edited by: Pablo Mari
- Music by: Atilio Stampone
- Production companies: Beco Films; Zaga Films
- Release dates: November 1987 (Mexico); April 1988 (Puerto Rico)
- Running time: 90 minutes
- Countries: Argentina; Puerto Rico
- Language: Spanish

Tango Bar is a 1987 Argentine-Puerto Rican musical drama film directed by Marcos Zurinaga and starring Raul Julia, Rubén Juárez and Valeria Lynch. It was written by Zurinaga with Juan Carlos Codazzi and José Pablo Feinmann. It was selected as the Puerto Rican entry for the Best Foreign Language Film at the 61st Academy Awards, but was not accepted as a nominee.

== Synopsis ==
A popular Tango venue in Buenos Aires, Argentina is run by two friends: Antonio Estévez, an Argentine musician and bandoneon player and Ricardo Padin, a Puerto Rican poet and pianist. Elena, who is Antonio's wife, begins a romantic relationship with the Ricardo when Antonio decides to go into exile from his country due to the oppressive climate of the penultimate Argentine civic-military dictatorship (1966-1973), while Elena and Ricardo choose to stay. Years later, with the return of Democracy from 1983 onwards, Antonio returns to his country with the desire to reunite with Ricardo, Elena and the world of tango. But the reunion only awakes conflicts and revolutionized feelings.

== Cast ==
- Raul Julia as Ricardo Padin
- Valeria Lynch as Elena
- Rubén Juárez as Antonio
- Carlos Gardel as Himself
- Rudolph Valentino as Himself
- Stan Laurel as Himself
- Oliver Hardy as Himself

== See also ==
- List of submissions to the 61st Academy Awards for Best Foreign Language Film
- List of Puerto Rican submissions for the Academy Award for Best Foreign Language Film
