= Hispanic Organization of Latin Actors =

The Hispanic Organization of Latin Artists (HOLA) is an active arts service and advocacy organization founded in 1975. It is in the United States and is dedicated to Hispanic artists, actors and actresses.

HOLA's Directory of Talent was created in 1981 and was the first directory to feature solely Latino talent.

Previous and current HOLA members include Emilio Sosa Emilio Sosa(Current Chairman), Ricardo Stevan Ricardo Stevan (current Executive Director), Ana María Estrada (President),Fortuna Calvo-Roth, Carlos Carrasco (at one time the Executive Director), Míriam Colón, Liza Colón-Zayas, Delilah Cotto, Raúl Dávila (at one time its President), Caridad de la Luz, Robin de Jesús, Idalis DeLeón, Emilio Delgado, Venuz Delmar, Moisés Kaufman, Malcolm March, Ana Margarita Martínez-Casado, Jorge Merced, Olga Merediz, Antone Pagán, Ilka Tanya Payán, Antonia Rey, Daphne Rubin-Vega, Jaime Sánchez, Roselyn Sánchez, Jimmy Smits, Miguel Ángel Suárez, Judy Torres and David Zayas.

== History ==
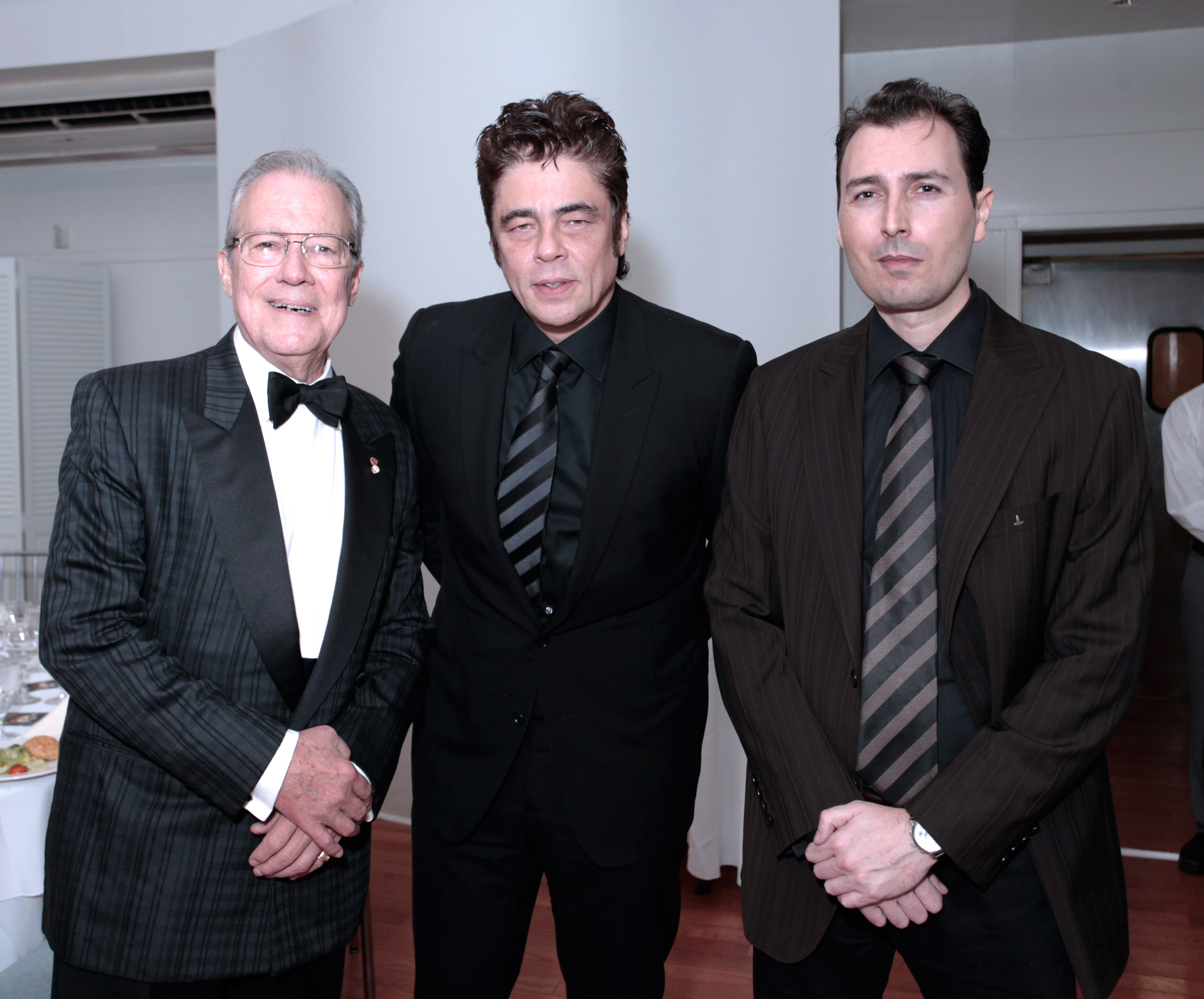
Manolo Garcia-Oliva, president of HOLA, right, with awardees Benicio del Toro, center, and Artur Balder, left, during a ceremony.

HOLA was founded in 1975 by a group of Hispanic actors (including founding president Ilka Tanya Payán and founding members Elizabeth Peña and Raúl Juliá) concerned with the images of Latinos in the media. The organization functions as a advocacy group in the entertainment industry for actors working on stage, on television and in film. In one well-documented case in the 1990s, HOLA successfully collaborated with Actors’ Equity Association to shine a light on questionable casting practices being employed at the time on Broadway. The show in question then was the Ariel Dorfman play Death and the Maiden. Since that time the number of Latinos on Broadway has increased steadily over the years. HOLA was originally located in the west 40s in Manhattan. It later moved to the Lincoln Square Neighborhood Center in the West Side of Manhattan in the shadow of Lincoln Center. Since 2001, HOLA has been located in the Clemente Soto Vélez Cultural and Educational Center in the Loisaida section of Manhattan.

== HOLA Awards ==
Early in its history, the organization had an excellence in artistic achievement awards program (then called the H.O.L.A. Awards) that were held in the 1970s before being suspended. The HOLA Awards were held once again in 1999 and are held yearly.

HOLA Awardees have included well known artists such as Antonio Banderas, Rubén Blades, Danny Burstein, Bobby Cannavale, Nilo Cruz, Alfonso Cuarón, Benicio del Toro, Héctor Elizondo, Lupita Ferrer, Marlene Forte, Andy Garcia, Moises Kaufman, John Leguizamo, Bianca Marroquín, Lin-Manuel Miranda, Sara Montiel, Alfred Molina, John Ortiz, Pedro Pascal, Rosie Pérez, Daphne Rubin-Vega, Mercedes Ruehl, Felix Solis, Lauren Velez, and David Zayas.

== Programming ==
HOLA’s educational programming offers professional development and training for members and the Hispanic community. These are invaluable resources for artists to further develop their skills, gain practical experience and industry knowledge:

- HOLA MASTER CLASSES provide Hispanic and Latino actors opportunities to learn from industry professionals in theater, film, television, streaming media, and voice-overs to improve their skills.
- HOLA WORKSHOPS are taught by industry professionals to offer more expansive and deeper training for Hispanic actors to further prepare them for the challenges of the theater, media and entertainment industry.
- HOLA TALKS are lectures or conferences that discuss important information to Latino's in themes considered relevant for their careers and wellbeing.

HOLA is also focusing on diversity initiative programming that is dedicated to the advocacy for expansion in the presence and job opportunities of Latino artists in theater, entertainment and media.

- HOLA PANELS create a space for debates on inclusion, empowerment and diverse aspects that concern the performing arts linked to a specific community within the great diversity of the Latino culture in the United States.
- HOLA SPOTLIGHTS is a series of online conversations that highlight the diversity in the Latin and Hispanic talent and culture.

Other current and past programs that HOLA has held over its long history include professional training units of workshops and seminars (HOLAfábrica), in-house casting referral service (HOLAgram), and a series of special events including networking events and HOLA After the Curtain series).
