= Las Monjas (Hato Rey) =

- Subbarrio
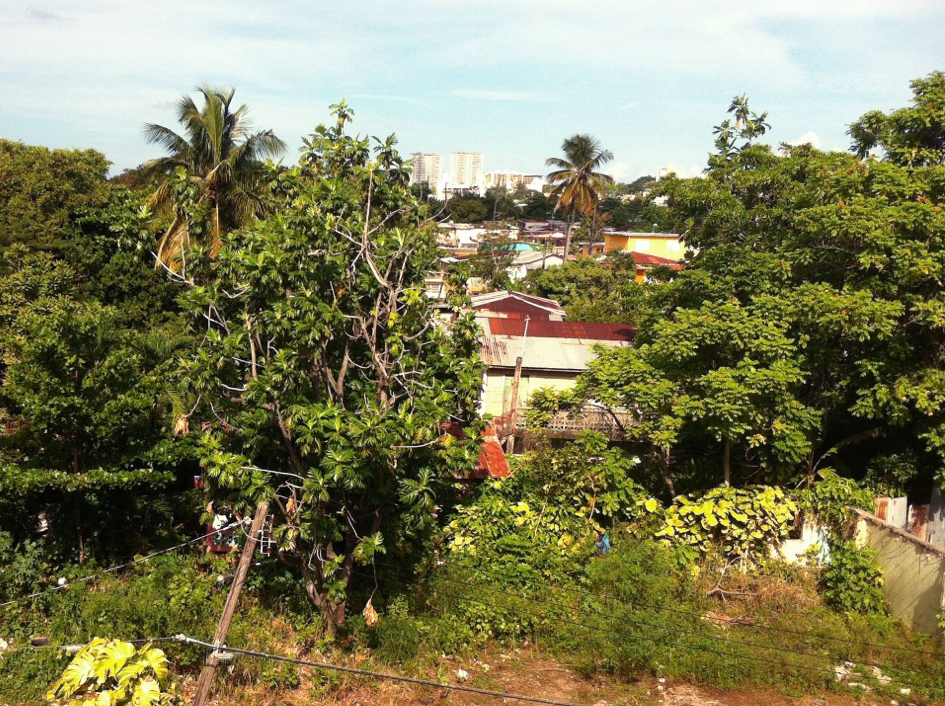

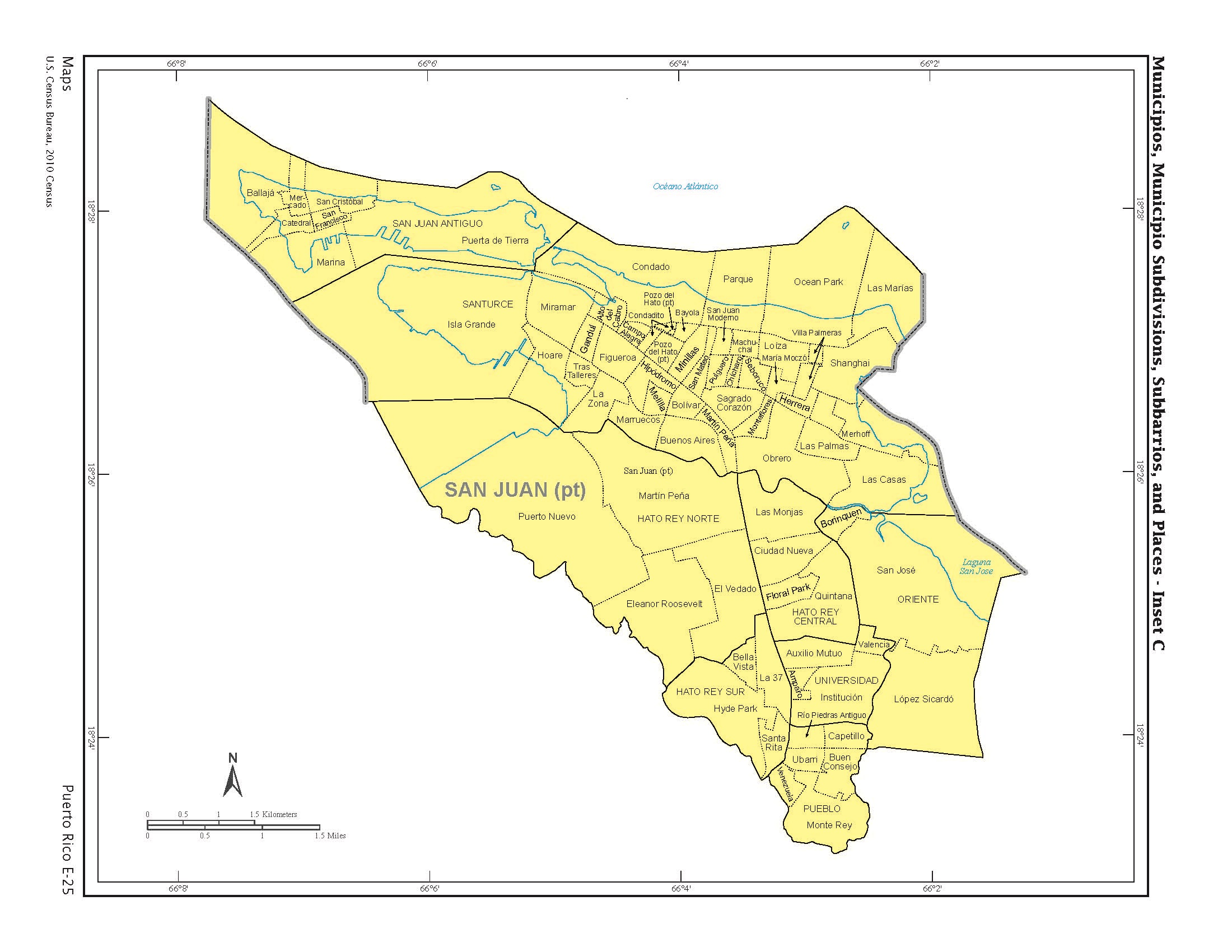
- US 2010 Census map of San Juan, its barrios and subbarrios

- Location of Las Monjas subbarrio in Hato Rey barrio in San Juan in Puerto Rico
- Coordinates: 18°25′43″N 66°03′13″W
- Commonwealth: Puerto Rico
- Municipality: San Juan
- Barrio: Hato Rey Central

Area
  - Total: .32 sq mi (0.83 km^{2})
  - Land: .31 sq mi (0.80 km^{2})
  - Water: .01 sq mi (0.026 km^{2})
- Elevation: 0 ft (0 m)

Population (2010)
  - Total: 6,018
  - Density: 19,412.9/sq mi (7,495.4/km^{2})
- Source: 2010 Census
- Time zone: UTC−4 (AST)

Las Monjas is a subbarrio, a legal subdivision of Hato Rey Central, a barrio in San Juan, Puerto Rico.
