= Raul Julia =

Puerto Rican actor (1940–1994)

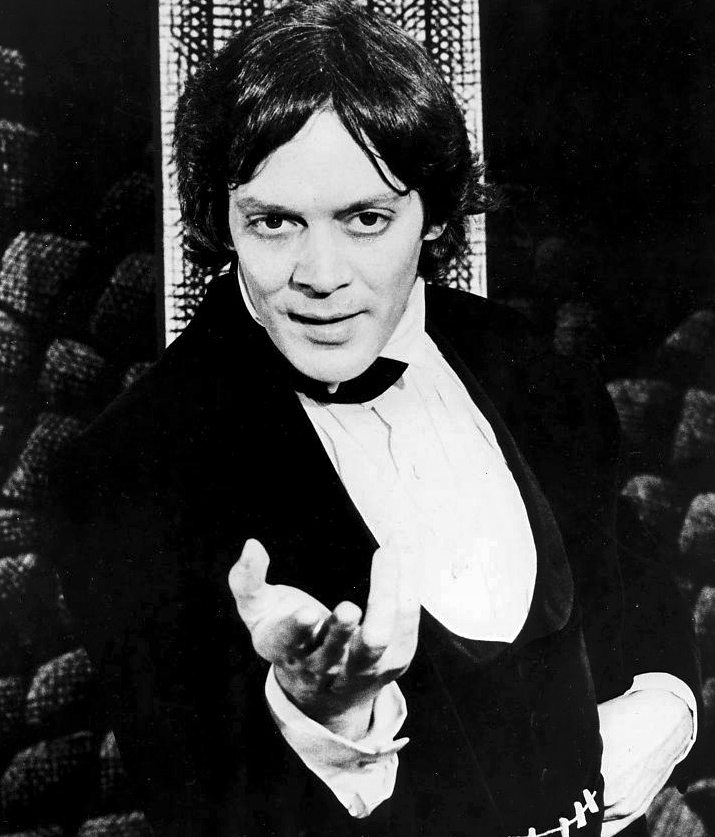
- Julia as Dracula (1977)
- Born: Raúl Rafael Juliá y Arcelay; March 9, 1940; Floral Park, San Juan, Puerto Rico
- Died: October 24, 1994 (aged 54); Manhasset, New York, U.S.
- Resting place: Buxeda Memorial Park Cemetery, Río Piedras, Puerto Rico
- Education: Fordham University; University of Puerto Rico, Rio Piedras Campus (BA)
- Occupations: Actor; humanitarian
- Years active: 1963–1994
- Spouses: Magda Vasallo Molinelli (m. 1965; div. 1969) Merel Poloway (m. 1976)
- Children: 2

Raúl Rafael Carlos Juliá y Arcelay (March 9, 1940 – October 24, 1994) was a Puerto Rican actor and humanitarian. He was best known for his intense and varied roles on stage and screen. He started his career in the Public Theater before transitioning to film. He received numerous accolades including a Drama Desk Award, a Primetime Emmy Award, a Golden Globe Award, a Screen Actors Guild Award and nominations for four Tony Awards. In 2017, The Daily Telegraph named him one of the best actors never to have received an Academy Award nomination.

Born in San Juan, Julia took an interest in acting while in school and pursued the career upon completion of his studies. After performing locally for some time, he was convinced by actor and entertainment personality Orson Bean to move to New York City. Julia, who had been bilingual since childhood, soon gained interest in Broadway and off-Broadway plays. He performed in mobile projects, including the Puerto Rican Traveling Theater. Julia was eventually noticed by producer Joseph Papp, who offered him work in the New York Shakespeare Festival.

In 1978, Julia starred alongside Meryl Streep in a revival of Shakespeare's Taming of the Shrew at the Delacorte Theater. He received four Tony Award for Best Actor in a Musical nominations for Two Gentlemen of Verona (1972), Where's Charley? (1975), The Threepenny Opera (1977), and Nine (1982). Julia starred in the original Broadway production of Harold Pinter's Betrayal (1979). He also starred in revivals of Design for Living (1984), Othello (1991), and his final Broadway role Man of La Mancha (1994).

Julia gained prominence for his role as Gomez Addams in two film adaptations of The Addams Family. He received Golden Globe Award nominations for Tempest (1982), Kiss of the Spider Woman (1985), and Moon Over Parador (1988). He is also known for his film roles in The Panic in Needle Park (1971), One from the Heart (1982), The Morning After (1986), Romero (1989), Presumed Innocent (1990) and Street Fighter (1994). In 1994, Julia suffered several health afflictions, eventually dying after suffering a stroke. For his work in The Burning Season, he was posthumously awarded a Primetime Emmy Award for Outstanding Lead Actor and a Golden Globe Award for Best Actor – Miniseries, or Television Film.

== Early life and education ==
Julia was born March 9, 1940, in Floral Park (Hato Rey), a suburb of San Juan, to Raúl Juliá Sr., an electrical engineer who graduated from Trine University, and Olga Arcelay, a mezzo-soprano who sang in a church choir. He was the oldest of four brothers alongside sisters Maria Eugenia Juliá and Olga Maria Juliá. When Julia was 19 years old, his brother Rafa died in a car accident. Some relatives were also musicians, including his great-aunt María González, whom he credited as the inspiration behind his artistic career. The family was Catholic. His direct paternal line goes back to his great-great-grandfather, Francisco Julià Brell, from Barcelona, Spain, who settled in Manati, Puerto Rico, in 1834.

Raúl Juliá Sr. was the founder of La Cueva del Chicken Inn, a restaurant in San Juan. The building was originally a gas station and auto body shop before being remodeled after a similar restaurant in Madrid, Spain, called Las Cuevas de Luis Candelas, which is intended to mimic the structure of a gypsum cave. He claimed that he had brought pizza to Puerto Rico after hiring an Italian cook in New York City who could prepare pizza. The restaurant is also supposed to be the first to distribute chicken-in-a-basket in the archipelago, which Miriam Fitts helped him develop.

Julia was enrolled in the Colegio Espíritu Santo in Hato Rey, a Catholic private school, where most of the personnel spoke exclusively English. There, he participated in his first play in first grade, interpreting the devil, with his performance earning him participation in all subsequent school plays. After witnessing Errol Flynn's performance in The Adventures of Robin Hood, he decided to pursue an acting career.

During his childhood, Julia's family followed a strict Jesuit practice, often taking homeless children into their household. His mother received recognition from the Catholic University of Ponce for these efforts.

By the seventh grade, Julia was able to speak English fluently and had gained interest in the works of William Shakespeare. Julia concluded his secondary education at Colegio San Ignacio de Loyola, where he would organize plays of Julius Caesar, Hamlet, King Lear, and The Tempest. Seeking to please his parents, he continued his education with a year at Fordham University, the well-known private Jesuit university in New York City, before returning home to enroll at the University of Puerto Rico, where, just like his father, he joined Phi Sigma Alpha fraternity.

Julia continued acting in local plays and nightclubs as he earned a bachelor of arts degree. Julia eventually realized that he had no interest in pursuing the law career favored by his parents, choosing to act full-time despite having doubts that he could sustain himself working as an actor. His parents did not support this decision.

== Acting career ==
=== New York Shakespeare Festival ===
Julia began performing in several plays that were held in San Juan, debuting in La Vida es un Sueño. He performed in a restaging of Macbeth, which was held in one of the municipality's colonial castles in order to simulate the setting of the work. Other works included playing the role of Roderigo in Othello at a local drama production. Parallel to this, Julia began making presentations at the Ted Mack Amateur Hour. After joining a musical group named the Lamplighters, despite receiving opposition from his parents, he was recruited by Lillian Hurst to perform alongside her, eventually receiving work at a hotel named El Convento.

During this time, he began considering the possibility of moving to Europe to take acting classes. During one of their acts, Julia was approached by Orson Bean, who was on vacation in Puerto Rico and provided him with contact information, wanting him to travel to New York and work there. His parents were shocked by the proposal, but ultimately agreed to support his decision. Julia's departure was postponed after his younger brother, Rafael, died in a traffic collision. During this time, he became engaged to Magda Vasallo Molinelli.

In 1964, when he was 24 years old, he traveled to New York City, arriving in the middle of a winter storm. After establishing residence in Manhattan, Julia worked at a variety of odd jobs to pay his expenses, going so far as to attend sales training (provided by a distributor) in the proper way to sell pens. When Hurst visited him, they attended a Broadway play, which prompted a discovery that surprised him—that it was possible to work as an actor full-time. As a result, Julia began seeking employment in both Broadway and Off-Broadway plays. Seeking to further improve his acting, he took lessons from Wynn Handman, who was recommended by Bean; his class included future fellow star Christopher Walken.

His first work was in a production of Pedro Calderón de la Barca's Life Is a Dream, wherein he played Astolfo, thereby making himself eligible to receive his Actors Equity card from Actors' Equity Association. Initially, Julia received an allowance from his parents, but after hiring manager Jeff Hunter, he landed a role in a production of Bye Bye Birdie, thereafter declining further financial assistance. He began performing with Phoebe Brand's mobile theatre, presenting plays in low-income neighborhoods of New York. This wasn't always easy and the group was frequently attacked with cans and other items, including one incident in which a pillow was lit on fire and thrown their way. In 1965, he married Vasallo Molinelli.

In 1966, Julia was cast in the role of Macduff in a Spanish-language version of Macbeth, and also performed in The Ox Cart (La Carreta), a stage play written by Puerto Rican playwright René Marqués. Míriam Colón Valle, who also participated in La Carreta, established the Puerto Rican Traveling Theater, where he performed. In 1967, the founder of the New York Shakespeare Festival (NYSF), Joseph Papp, attended a performance at Delacorte Theater, where Julia was reading patriotic Puerto Rican poetry. Subsequently, Papp offered him the role of Demetrius in a staging of Titus Andronicus. After this play concluded, he contacted Papp who offered him the job of stage manager in NYSF's Hamlet. While performing this task, Julia also performed in some of the plays.

=== Broadway and television ===
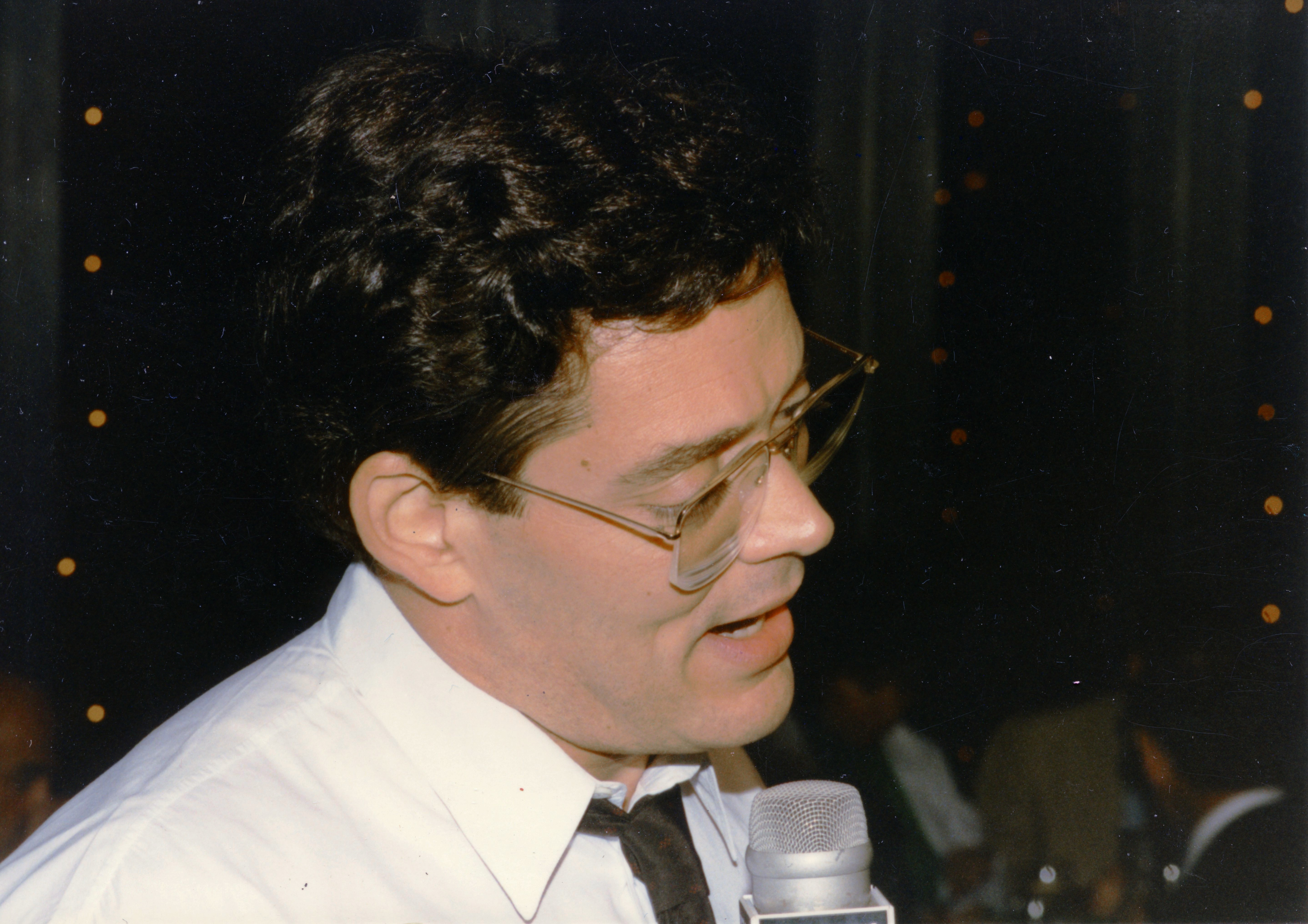
Juliá at the cast party on the opening night of Design for Living

In September 1968, after auditioning four times for the role, Julia debuted in his first Broadway play, performing as Chan in a staging of The Cuban Thing. The following year, he was cast in a production of Arthur Kopit's Indians. During this time, Vasallo Molinelli and he were divorced. In 1970, Julia, in the role of Paco Montoya in The Castro Complex, received notably favorable reviews. While rehearsing for an off-Broadway play, he met Merel Poloway and began a relationship with her.

As he gained prominence on Broadway, Julia was cast in two television series, Love of Life and Sesame Street. He disliked his role in Love of Life, only appearing on the show for a brief time. On Sesame Street, he was Rafael the Fix-It Man, a recurring character during the show's third season. Raphael the Fix-It Man's partner at the Fix-It Shop was Emilio Delgado's character Luis, who after debuting with Julia, went on to a long tenure on the show. During 1971–1972, Julia earned roles in three films: The Organization, The Panic in Needle Park, and a film adaptation of Been Down So Long It Looks Like Up to Me.

While working on Sesame Street, Julia was contacted by Papp, who offered him the role of Proteus in the new musical version of Two Gentlemen of Verona. For his performance in this musical, Julia received his first nomination for a Tony Award and won the 1972 Drama Desk Award for Outstanding Performance. In 1973, he interpreted Edmund in King Lear, followed by the role of Orlando in As You Like It. Julia noted that he cherished the roles he played in these Shakespeare plays, particularly the rhythm, music, and poetry present in them. He also acted in Via Galactica's limited presentation on Broadway and, on television, played Dr. Greg Robinson, Jerry's brother, in the "Oh, Brother" episode of The Bob Newhart Show.

In 1974, Julia was cast as the titular role of Charley Wykeham in the comedy, Where's Charley?, receiving his second Tony Award nomination for his performance. He subsequently joined Werner Erhard's Erhard Seminars Training or "est", an organization that promotes self-motivation, by participating in its seminars. In 1976, Julia played Mack the Knife in The Threepenny Opera, interpreting the dialogue with a marked British accent. The performance earned him a third Tony Award nomination. He then returned to film as Italian car racer Franco Bertollini in The Gumball Rally.

That same year, Julia married Poloway in the Catskill Mountains. The ceremony was led by Swami Muktananda as part of a spiritual retreat. The couple had met the Swami through Erhard. After this retreat, Erhard founded The Hunger Project, claiming that after traveling to India, he felt motivated to found a nonprofit organization to eliminate world hunger through philanthropic galas. Julia joined the initiative at its conception, establishing a personal goal of raising $1 million for the organization. In 1978, his interpretation of the lead role in the 1924 theatrical version of Dracula was well received.

While performing as Dracula, Julia also played Petruchio in The Taming of the Shrew in 1978. His interaction with co-star Meryl Streep was tense at first, before developing into a friendship as the production advanced. In 1979, he starred as Othello opposite Richard Dreyfuss as Iago, later reviving the role in 1991 with Christopher Walken as Iago. Julia followed up his double-duty stage work with a role in Paul Mazursky's film adaptation of The Tempest, spending several months in Italy while exploring its culture. During this time, he received the script for Nine, the play that would garner him a fourth Tony Award nomination. In preparation for his role in Harold Pinter's Betrayal, Julia moved temporarily to London, hiring a dialect coach to train him in British pronunciation. Julia subsequently used a British or trans-Atlantic accent for most of his film work, including Presumed Innocent, The Addams Family films, and Street Fighter.

=== Acting in Hollywood ===
In 1982, Julia played Calibanos in Mazursky's Tempest and Ray in the musical One from the Heart. In 1983, his first son with Poloway, Raul Sigmund Julia, was born. That year, he also starred in the public television film Overdrawn at the Memory Bank, which received a weak reception and was satirized on Mystery Science Theater 3000. After not appearing in a film for two years, Julia played a political prisoner named Valentín in an adaptation of the Manuel Puig work Kiss of the Spider Woman. Valentín's cellmate is a flamboyant homosexual (William Hurt), jailed for immoral behavior in Brazil, who passes the time by describing scenes from his favorite romantic movie to Valentín; slowly, the two form a bond based on mutual understanding and respect. In view of the uniqueness of the script, Julia agreed to begin filming before receiving his salary and traveled to South America, where he interviewed rebels and ex-prisoners to familiarize himself with their experiences and ideology. Upon its release, Kiss of the Spider Woman was a commercial and critical success. For his performance, Julia received a nomination for the Golden Globe Award and won the National Board of Review of Motion Pictures award for best actor, along with co-lead actor William Hurt.

The following year, he appeared in his first Puerto Rican film, La Gran Fiesta, offering a monologue near the end of the film. In 1985, he starred as Major Sergius Saranoff in an adaptation of Arms and the Man. This was followed by the role of David Suárez in the romantic comedy Compromising Positions. In 1986, Julia played a hairdresser named Joaquin Manero in The Morning After. Following his usual procedure of practical preparation for a role, he took cosmetology lessons and worked at a hair salon for some time.

In 1987, Julia had the lead role in The Penitent. Later on that year, his second son with Poloway, Benjamín Rafael Juliá, was born. In 1988, Julia played a corrupt official in Paul Mazursky's comedy, Moon over Parador, which received negative reviews from critics. The following year, he co-starred with Anthony Quinn in Onassis: The Richest Man in the World, a biographic film covering the life of Aristotle Onassis. In 1989, Julia was cast as San Salvadoran Archbishop Óscar Romero in the biographical movie, Romero. During his life, Romero had been a staunch advocate of human rights, often publicly denouncing violations of these rights, which prompted his assassination during a mass. Julia accepted the role based on its political nature, seeking to draw attention to the issues in that region of Central America. To prepare for the role, he read Romero's diary and autobiography, as well as listening to or watching recordings of his messages and masses, which prompted him to rejoin the Catholic Church. Poloway, who is Jewish, and he decided not to raise their children in a particular religion, believing that they should make their own decisions after reaching adulthood. The government of El Salvador refused to allow distribution of the film because of its content, so the film received only clandestine circulation. Due to his activity between 1987 and 1989, Julia was ranked first in the Variety article "List of Busiest Hollywood Actors". Julia then starred in the 1989 film adaptation of The Threepenny Opera, recreating the role of Macheath for the movie, which was renamed Mack the Knife for its American release.

In 1990, he was cast as a lawyer in Presumed Innocent, receiving critical praise for his performance. Prior to the filming, Julia spent time in courtrooms and studied the court system. Also in 1990, he appeared opposite Robert Redford in Havana, but chose to remain uncredited because the director, Sydney Pollack, refused to give him above-the-title credit. In 1991, when Joseph Papp died, Julia commented that the director was directly responsible for finding him roles besides that of "stereotypical Latinos", such as the "Latin lover". Julia was cast to play Gomez Addams in an adaptation of The Addams Family. He was attracted to the role because of the character's irreverent portrayal, noting, "even his depressions are wonderful". Since his earlier recollections of the role were of the Spanish-dubbed version of the first television series, he had to adapt the role directly from the original cartoons drawn by Charles Addams, receiving a nomination for a Saturn Award.

In 1992, Julia played the title role in a revival of Man of La Mancha with Sheena Easton, a Broadway musical adaptation of the Miguel de Cervantes novel, Don Quixote. The play originated in 1965, with the main character played by Richard Kiley; one of his favorite actors, José Ferrer, had been considered for the title role at the time. Julia performed this role eight times per week. Subsequently, he reprised his role as Gomez Addams in Addams Family Values. In 1994, Julia played Chico Mendes in The Burning Season for HBO, for which he received critical acclaim. He familiarized himself with the role by analyzing interviews and footage from Mendes' Xapuri Rubber Tappers Union.

Despite his poor health, which began three years prior to his death, he completed The Burning Season and was eager to play M. Bison in Street Fighter, which was to be filmed in Australia in the autumn. Julia felt that this film would allow him to spend more time with his children, who were fans of the video-game franchise and helped him prepare for the role. He received his second Saturn Award nomination for his performance, which was considered the high point of the otherwise poorly received motion picture. This would be his final role in a major film, with his last work being a leading role in the television drama Down Came a Blackbird, which was filmed in Toronto, Ontario during September and October 1994. His poor health was apparent in these last three films because of his substantial weight loss.

== Health and death ==
Julia had been privately suffering from stomach cancer for three years before his death and had undergone surgery for this in 1993. In early 1994, during the filming of The Burning Season in Mexico, he contracted food poisoning after consuming sushi. Julia was airlifted to a hospital in Los Angeles to receive medical attention. After recovering, he returned to Mexico to finish the film, although he had lost some weight and was physically weakened by his condition. On October 16, 1994, after attending an opera at the Metropolitan Opera in New York City with his wife, Julia began feeling intense abdominal pain and was taken by ambulance to North Shore University Hospital in Manhasset, Long Island. At first, he did not appear worried about his condition and was seen in his hospital bed eagerly reviewing the script for his upcoming role in Desperado, but his condition gradually worsened. On the evening of October 20, 1994, Julia suffered a stroke, fell into a coma, and was put on life support. Four days later, on October 24, he died at the age of 54 due to complications from the stroke, having never regained consciousness.

In accordance with Julia's instructions, his body was transported to Puerto Rico. A state funeral was held in San Juan on October 27, 1994, with Julia's body being escorted to the building of the Institute of Puerto Rican Culture, where a funeral ceremony was held. The service was attended by thousands of Puerto Ricans, with native plena music being played in the background. The burial ceremony was also attended by thousands, with "La Borinqueña" being sung by Lucecita Benítez prior to the procession. After stopping at San Ignacio de Loyola Church, the procession advanced to Buxeda Cemetery, where politician and activist Rubén Berríos offered the final words. As Julia's coffin was lowered, a load of carnations was dropped from a helicopter while the crowd shouted "¡Viva Puerto Rico Libre!" Julia was a supporter of the Puerto Rican independence movement; on one occasion, he convinced his agent to allow him to do an advertising campaign on behalf of the Puerto Rico Tourism Company.

Subsequent memorial ceremonies were held at Joseph Papp Public Theater in New York and in Los Angeles, where several actors and personalities, including Rubén Blades and Edward James Olmos, expressed their grief. A Mass was celebrated in Miami and numerous private ceremonies were also held. The staff of Universal Pictures paid homage to him by dedicating Street Fighter to his memory, adding the phrase "For Raúl. Vaya con Dios." in the film's ending credits. Julia had been set to reprise his role as M. Bison in the video-game version of the Street Fighter film, having already met with the production staff. The New York Shakespeare Festival bought an obituary notice in Variety, where his birth and death dates were accompanied by a quote from Shakespeare. The Puerto Rican Traveling Theater established the Raúl Juliá Training Unit, giving free acting classes to young actors.

For his performance in The Burning Season, Julia was posthumously awarded a Golden Globe Award, a Screen Actors Guild Award, a CableACE Award, and an Emmy Award. Although he did not make his screen debut before 1950, Julia was a nominee for the American Film Institute's AFI's 100 Years...100 Stars. Actors such as Helen Hunt and Jimmy Smits have cited him as a source of inspiration. On November 21, 1994, then-Mayor of New York City Rudy Giuliani declared that date Raul Julia Day. In 1996, he was inducted into the Theatre Hall of Fame on Broadway. The Puerto Rican Chamber of Commerce created the Raúl Juliá Scholarship Fund in 1997, intended to provide college education for teenagers. His career was the subject of a poem, Inigualable Raúl Juliá.

== Humanitarian work ==
During his lifetime, Julia continued the charitable work done by his parents during his childhood, engaging in social and educational activities. His contributions were acknowledged with an invitation to join the New York Council for the Humanities. Much of Julia's charity work was focused on at-risk youth, the Latin American community, and the arts. Concerned about rising levels of violence among teenagers, he sponsored scriptwriting programs in high schools and supported young actors. To promote other Latin American artists, Julia actively lent his support to the Hispanic Organization of Latin Actors (HOLA) and co-founded Visiones Luminosas, an initiative to foster screenwriters. He continued to work in the NYSF, electing to donate his time.

In a similar fashion, Julia co-operated with independent filmmakers in Puerto Rico by acting in their productions for free or receiving a reduced salary. This constant involvement with the Latin American community earned him a posthumous Hispanic Heritage Award. Julia also promoted interracial acceptance and cooperation as a member of Racial Harmony and served as the chairman of the Joseph Papp Celebrity Coalition for Racial Harmony.

As part of his work for the Hunger Project, Julia made monthly donations to a food bank. He also promoted the program on television and radio and served as the narrator of bilingual videos about the Hunger Project. Julia somehow found time in his notoriously busy schedule to participate in multiple benefit galas on behalf of the organization as well. Due to this work, the project gave him their Global Citizen Award. His involvement was also recognized in "Ending Hunger: An Idea Whose Time Has Come". On March 24, 1992, Julia received the Courage of Conscience Award. In 1994, the government of El Salvador recognized him for his human-rights activism, selecting him to serve as overseer of their general elections in representation of Freedom House. During his visit to the country, he visited the tomb of Romero, subsequently describing his experience in a piece published in Freedom Review.

In recognition of his wide-ranging impact, the National Endowment for the Hispanic Arts offers the Raul Julia Award for Excellence annually. In 2002, actress Sandra Bullock was presented with the award. She received it for her work as the executive producer of the George Lopez TV series, which offered work and exposition for Hispanic talent. In 2003, Daniel Rodríguez won the first Raul Julia Global Citizen Award from the New York-based Puerto Rico Family Institute, receiving the recognition for his charitable work.

== Work ==
=== Film ===
Year	Title	Role	Director	Notes
1971	The Panic in Needle Park	Marco	Jerry Schatzberg	
1971	Been Down So Long It Looks Like Up to Me	Juan Carlos Rosenbloom	Jeffrey Young	
1971	The Organization	Juan Mendoza	Don Medford	
1976	The Gumball Rally	Franco Bertollini	Charles Bail	
1978	Eyes of Laura Mars	Michael Reisler	Irvin Kershner	
1979	A Life of Sin	Paulo	Efraín López Neris	
1981	Strong Medicine	Raoul	Richard Foreman	
1982	One from the Heart	Ray	Francis Ford Coppola	
1982	The Escape Artist	Stu Quinones	Caleb Deschanel	
1982	Tempest	Kalibanos	Paul Mazursky	
1984	Overdrawn at the Memory Bank	Aram Fingal / Rick Blaine	Douglas Williams	Premiered on television
1985	Kiss of the Spider Woman	Valentin Arregui	Héctor Babenco	
1985	Compromising Positions	David Suarez	Frank Perry	
1986	La gran fiesta	Adolfo	Marcos Zurinaga	
1986	The Morning After	Joaquin Manero	Sidney Lumet	
1987	Tango Bar	Ricardo Padín	Marcos Zurinaga	
1988	The Penitent	Ramón Guerola	Cliff Osmond	
1988	Trading Hearts	Vinnie Iacona	Neil Leifer	
1988	Moon over Parador	Roberto Strausmann	Paul Mazursky	
1988	Tequila Sunrise	Commandante Xavier Escalante / Carlos	Robert Towne	
1989	Romero	Archbishop Óscar Romero	John Duigan	
1990	Mack the Knife	MacHeath	Menahem Golan	
1990	Presumed Innocent	Alejandro "Sandy" Stern	Alan J. Pakula	
1990	Frankenstein Unbound	Dr. Victor Frankenstein	Roger Corman	
1990	The Rookie	Ulrich Sigmund Strom	Clint Eastwood	
1990	Havana	Arturo Durán	Sydney Pollack	Uncredited
1991	The Addams Family	Gomez Addams	Barry Sonnenfeld	
1992	The Plague	Cottard	Luis Puenzo	
1993	Addams Family Values	Gomez Addams	Barry Sonnenfeld	
1994	Street Fighter	General M. Bison	Steven E. de Souza	Posthumous release

=== Television ===
Year	Title	Role	Notes
1971–1972	Sesame Street	Rafael, The Repairman	4 episodes
1974	The Bob Newhart Show	Gregory Robinson	Episode: "Oh, Brother"
1974	Great Performances	Edmund	Episode: "King Lear"
1975	Death Scream	Detective Nick Rodriguez	Television film
1985	Mussolini: The Untold Story	Count Galeazzo Ciano	Television miniseries
1986	Florida Straits	Carlos Jayne	Television film
1987	The Alamo: 13 Days to Glory	General Antonio López de Santa Anna	Television miniseries
1988	Onassis: The Richest Man in the World	Aristotle Onassis	Television film
1994	The Burning Season	Francisco "Chico" Mendes	Television film
1995	Down Came a Blackbird	Professor Tomas Ramirez	Television film, posthumous release

=== Theatre ===
Year	Title	Role	Theatre	Ref
1966	The Ox Cart	Luis	Greenwich Mews Theater	
1967	Titus Andronicus	Demetrius	Delacorte Theatre (New York Shakespeare Festival)	
1967	No Exit	Cradeau	Bouwerie Lane Theater	
1968	The Cuban Thing	Chan	Henry Miller's Theatre, Broadway	
1968–1970	Your Own Thing	Orson (replacement)	Orpheum Theatre, Off-Broadway	
1968	The Memorandum	Various Roles	The Public Theater, Off-Broadway	
1969	Frank Gagliano's City Scene	Workman (Paradise); Jesus (Conerico)	Fortune Theater, Off-Broadway	
1969	Indians	Grand Duke Alexis; Uncas / Poncho	Brooks Atkinson Theatre, Broadway	
1970	The Persians	Persian Elder	St. George's Episcopal Church	
1970	The Castro Complex	Paco Montoya	Stairway Theatre	
1971	Pinkville	Joe "Consequently Joe"	Theatre At St Clement's	
1971	As You Like It	Orlando	St. James Theatre, Broadway	
1972	Via Galactica	Gabriel Finn	Uris Theatre, Broadway	
1972	Hamlet	Osric	Delacorte Theatre (New York Shakespeare Festival)	
1971–1973	Two Gentlemen of Verona	Proteus	The Public Theater, Off-Broadway; St. James Theatre, Broadway	
1973	As You Like It	Orlando de Bois	Delacorte Theatre (New York Shakespeare Festival)	
1973	King Lear	Edmund	Delacorte Theatre (New York Shakespeare Festival)	
1974–1975	Where's Charley?	Charley Wykeham	Circle in the Square Theatre, Broadway	
1976–1977	The Threepenny Opera	Captain Macheath	Vivian Beaumont Theatre, Broadway (New York Shakespeare Festival)	
1977	The Cherry Orchard	Lopakhin; Ermolai Alekseevich	Vivian Beaumont Theatre, Broadway (New York Shakespeare Festival)	
1977–1980	Dracula	Count Dracula	Martin Beck Theatre, Broadway	
1978	The Taming of the Shrew	Petruchio	Delacorte Theatre (New York Shakespeare Festival)	
1979	Othello	Othello	Delacorte Theatre (New York Shakespeare Festival)	
1979–1980	Betrayal	Jerry	Nederlander Theatre, Broadway	
1981	The Tempest	Prospero	Delacorte Theatre, The Public Theater	
1982–1984	Nine	Guido Contini	46th Street Theatre, Broadway	
1984–1985	Design for Living	Leo	Circle in the Square Theatre, Broadway	
1985	Arms and the Man	Major Sergius Saranoff	Circle in the Square Theatre, Broadway	
1989–1990	Macbeth	Lord Macbeth	The Public Theater, Off-Broadway	
1991	Othello	Othello	Delacorte Theatre (New York Shakespeare Festival)	
1992	Man of La Mancha	Miguel de Cervantes; Don Quixote	Marquis Theatre, Broadway	

Other credits

- 1963 Bye, Bye Birdie (Teatro Tapia)
- 1963 The Fourposter (Teatro Tapia)
- 1963 The Happy Time (Teatro Tapia)
- 1963 Macbeth (Teatro Tapia)
- 1963 Othello (Teatro Tapia)
- 1964 Life Is a Dream (Astor Theatre) – New York debut
- 1966 La Carreta (Greenwich Mews Theatre)
- 1967 No Exit (Bouwerie Lane Theatre)
- 1968 The Hide and Seek Odyssey of Madelain Gimple (Eugene O'Neill Theater Center)
- 1969 Paradise Gardens (Fortune Theatre)
- 1971 Pinkville (St. Clement's Church)
- 1972 Hamlet (Delacorte Theatre)

=== Pinball ===
Year	Title	Role
1992	The Addams Family	Gomez Addams (voice) (Note: Due to being one of only two credited voices featured in the game, Julia technically also voices Gomez's brother Fester, whose only dialogue is shouting "Hey!" alongside Gomez whenever the player hits a target during the Mamushka gameplay mode.)

== Awards and nominations ==
Year	Award	Category	Nominated work	Result	Ref.
1972	Tony Awards	Best Leading Actor in a Musical	Two Gentlemen of Verona	Nominated	
1975	Tony Awards	Best Leading Actor in a Musical	Where's Charley?	Nominated	
1977	Tony Awards	Best Leading Actor in a Musical	The Threepenny Opera	Nominated	
1982	Tony Awards	Best Leading Actor in a Musical	Nine	Nominated	
1972	Drama Desk Awards	Outstanding Performance	Two Gentlemen of Verona	Won	
1975	Drama Desk Awards	Outstanding Actor in a Musical	Where's Charley?	Nominated	
1976	Drama Desk Awards	Outstanding Actor in a Musical	The Threepenny Opera	Nominated	
1983	Golden Globe Awards	Best Supporting Actor – Motion Picture	Tempest	Nominated	
1986	Golden Globe Awards	Best Actor in a Motion Picture – Drama	Kiss of the Spider Woman	Nominated	
1989	Golden Globe Awards	Best Supporting Actor – Motion Picture	Moon over Parador	Nominated	
1995	Golden Globe Awards	Best Actor in a Miniseries or Motion Picture Made for Television	The Burning Season	Won	
1985	National Board of Review Awards	Best Actor	Kiss of the Spider Woman	Won (Note: Tied with William Hurt for Kiss of the Spider Woman.)	
1991	Fangoria Chainsaw Awards	Best Actor	The Addams Family	Nominated	
1992	MTV Movie & TV Awards	Best Kiss	The Addams Family (shared with Anjelica Huston)	Nominated	
1993	Saturn Awards	Best Actor	The Addams Family	Nominated	
1995	Saturn Awards	Best Supporting Actor	Street Fighter	Nominated	
1995	Screen Actors Guild Awards	Outstanding Performance by a Male Actor in a Television Movie or Miniseries	The Burning Season	Won	
1995	Primetime Emmy Awards	Outstanding Lead Actor in a Miniseries or a Special	The Burning Season	Won	
1995	CableACE Awards	Actor in a Miniseries or Movie	The Burning Season	Won	
1995	CableACE Awards	Actor in a Miniseries or Movie	Down Came a Blackbird	Nominated	
1998	Los Angeles Latino International Film Festival	Lifetime Achievement Award	—N/a	Won	

== See also ==
- Cinema of Puerto Rico
- List of Puerto Ricans
