= Marcos Zurinaga =

Puerto Rican film director

Marcos Zurinaga is a Puerto Rican film director, screenwriter and cinematographer.

== Biography ==
His late mother was UPR professor Rosa Zurinaga. He studied at the UPR Elementary School, University High School (UHS) and obtained his B.A. at UPR in 1972. He joined Puerto Rican filmmaker Roberto Gándara upon graduation, setting aside plans to study a master's degree, founding the film company Zaga Films. Among the several movies that he has directed is La Gran Fiesta, a movie about the last grand party at the "Casino de Puerto Rico" building in Old San Juan, before it was turned over to military use as the United States was drawn into World War II, and A Step Away, a 1980 critically acclaimed movie narrated by Orson Welles. In 1996 came an unusual movie in Zurinaga's filmography, the thriller-mystery film The Disappearance of Garcia Lorca.

== Filmography ==
- Siempre estuvimos aquí (director) 1977
- Alicia Alonso y el ballet Nacional de Cuba (16 mm, color, 90 mins. Director) 1979
- A Step Away (35 mm, color, 120 mins. Director. Roberto Ponce Producer) 1980
- La Gran Fiesta (35 mm, color, 100 mins. Director, Producer and screenwriter) 1985
- Tango Bar (35 mm, color. Director, Producer and Screenwriter) 1987
- A flor de piel (35 mm, color, 80 mins. Director) 1990
- Puerto Rico (70 mm, color, 15 mins. Director and Producer) 1992
- Un pueblo que canta-a Banco Popular de Puerto Rico Christmas special (Video. Director) 1994
- El espíritu de un pueblo-a Banco Popular de Puerto Rico Christmas special (Video. Director) 1995
- Somos un solo pueblo-a Banco Popular de Puerto Rico Christmas special (Video. Director) 1996
- The Disappearance of Garcia Lorca (35 mm, color. Director, Screenwriter and Producer) 1996
- Siempre Piel Canela (Video. Director) 1998
- Mariela y otras historias Director. Caesar Osiris 2010
