= Ilka Tanya Payán =

American actress

- Payán in 1977
- Born: January 7, 1943; Santo Domingo, Dominican Republic
- Died: April 6, 1996 (aged 53); Manhattan, New York City, New York, United States

Ilka Tanya Payán (January 7, 1943 – April 6, 1996) was a Dominican-born actress and attorney who later became a prominent HIV/AIDS activist in the United States.

== Early life ==
Payán was born in Santo Domingo, Dominican Republic and immigrated to the United States at the age of thirteen, settling permanently in New York City.

== Acting career ==
She became widely recognized for her role in the Spanish-language telenovela Angelica, Mi Vida ("Angelica, My Life"). It was from her role on this serial that provided Payán with the experience to move on to bigger roles in Hollywood with a small role in the film Scarface, and a guest role on the television series Hill Street Blues. Prior to these roles, she had worked in local theatrical and television projects in the Dominican Republic, Puerto Rico, and Spain.

She also worked hard to encourage New York's Latino theater community. She was a founder of the Hispanic Organization of Latin Actors (HOLA), and was heavily involved with International Arts Relations (INTAR).

== AIDS activism ==
Payán studied law at Peoples College of Law in Los Angeles, California, and became an attorney in 1981, practicing immigration law. It was around this time she contracted HIV from a former lover, for which she did not test positive until 1986. Caught completely off guard by the discovery, she revealed her status to her husband, her then 22-year-old daughter, her niece, and several friends. She and her second husband separated several years later, and ultimately divorced. He never contracted HIV.

Payán did not publicly disclose her status until 1993. Payán's announcement shocked many in the Hispanic community because she was one of the first Latino celebrities to do so. While it was widely believed that the death of singer Héctor Lavoe in June 1993 influenced her, Payán in an interview with the New York Times said that it was an encounter with a man who she liked that helped her make the decision to announce her status. She confirmed to having HIV upon being asked by the interviewer.

The announcement did not go well with some of her ten sisters and six brothers; many who lived in the Dominican Republic were disturbed over the fact that her revelation was received negatively there, as the general consensus in Latin American countries during the second half of the 1980s and early 1990s was that AIDS only affected homosexuals and prostitutes. Payán spent the final three years of her life educating the public about the realities of AIDS. On December 10, 1993 she was given the honor of being chosen as the featured speaker at the United Nations panel for World AIDS Day. Speaking to this world body of diplomats allowed her to discuss the importance of educating citizens of developing nations on how to protect themselves and prevent the spread of the disease. In addition to her work, Payán was honored by her native country when Dominican president Joaquín Balaguer awarded her the Medal of Honor in recognition of her activism. She appeared on the cover of POZ magazine in August 2005, where she was featured in article detailing her life and activism. Payán died from AIDS-related complications at her Hell's Kitchen home on April 6, 1996. In the years preceding her death, Payán worked in the legal department for the Gay Men's Health Crisis, a non-profit, volunteer-supported and community-based HIV/AIDS organization that has led the fight in educating the public on HIV/AIDS prevention.

== Tributes ==
Since 1999, the Hispanic Organization of Latin Actors (HOLA) has given out the HOLA Ilka Award for Humanitarianism in her honor.

On March 1, 2002, New York City renamed a park in the predominantly-Dominican Manhattan neighborhood of Washington Heights in her honor. The "Ilka Tanya Payán Park" is located on the Greenstreet bounded between 156th and 157th Streets, and Broadway and Morgan Place.

On September 27, 2005, the "Ilka Tanya Payán Theatre" located at the Times Square Arts Center was dedicated. It is meant to serve as an experimental theater for Latino actors and productions.

There are panels in the AIDS Quilt commemorating her.

== Filmography ==
Year	Title	Role	Notes
1981	Hill Street Blues	Teresa	TV series, 1 episode
1983	Scarface	Mrs. Gutierrez	
1986	Florida Straits	Carmen	TV movie
1990	Sesame Street Home Video Visits the Firehouse	Dolores - Neighbor (as Ilka Tanya Payan)	VHS
