= The Disappearance of Garcia Lorca =

1996 film by Marcos Zurinaga

- Theatrical release poster
- Directed by: Marcos Zurinaga
- Screenplay by: Marcos Zurinaga; Juan Antonio Ramos; Neil Cohen
- Based on: The Assassination of Federico Garcia Lorca and Federico Garcia Lorca: A Life by Ian Gibson
- Produced by: Enrique Cerezo
- Starring: Esai Morales; Edward James Olmos; Andy García; Jeroen Krabbé; Teresa José Berganza; Miguel Ferrer; Marcela Walerstein; Denise Blasor; Tony Plana; Eusebio Lázaro; Giancarlo Giannini
- Cinematography: Juan Ruiz Anchía
- Edited by: Carole Kravetz Aykanian; Lisa Bromwell
- Music by: Mark McKenzie
- Production companies: Antena 3 Televisión; Canal+ Enrique Cerezo Producciones Cinematográficas S.A. Esparza/Katz Productions; Kanzaman; Miramar Films
- Distributed by: Columbia TriStar Films de España (Spain); Triumph Films (United States)
- Release date: October 24, 1996
- Running time: 142 minutes
- Countries: Spain; United States; France; Puerto Rico
- Language: English
- Box office: $226,427

The Disappearance of Garcia Lorca is a 1996 biographical drama film co-written and directed by Marcos Zurinaga. It is based on a book by Ian Gibson about the life and murder of Spanish poet Federico García Lorca. It stars Andy García as Lorca and Esai Morales as Ricardo, a journalist who investigates Lorca's disappearance during the early years of the Spanish Civil War. The film earned ALMA Award nominations for both Garcia and Morales, best feature film, and best Latino director for Zurinaga. It received an Imagen Award for Best Motion Picture.

== Reception ==
On the review aggregator website Rotten Tomatoes, 29% of 7 critics' reviews are positive.
