= Wings of Fire (film) =

- Title card
- Genre: Action; Drama
- Written by: Stirling Silliphant
- Directed by: David Lowell Rich
- Starring: Suzanne Pleshette; James Farentino; Lloyd Nolan; Juliet Mills; Jeremy Slate; Ralph Bellamy
- Theme music composer: Samuel Matlovsky
- Country of origin: United States
- Original language: English

Production
- Producer: David Lowell Rich
- Production locations: Universal Studios; Brackett Field
- Cinematography: Bud Thackery; Ray Fernstrom (Aerial cinematography)
- Editor: Tony Martinelli
- Running time: 99 min.
- Production company: David L. Wolper Productions

Original release
- Network: NBC
- Release: February 14, 1967

Wings of Fire (a.k.a. The Cloudburst) is a 1967 American made-for-television action-drama film broadcast on NBC on February 14, 1967, directed by David Lowell Rich. The film starred Suzanne Pleshette, James Farentino, Lloyd Nolan, Juliet Mills, Jeremy Slate and Ralph Bellamy. The plot concerns a female pilot wanting to become an air racer.

== Plot ==
Doug Sanborn (Ralph Bellamy) runs a small charter company based at a regional airport. His daughter, Kitty (Suzanne Pleshette), a young female pilot wants to be in the Unlimited class at the air races but her male friends stymie her ambitions. Her former boyfriend Taff Malloy (James Farentino) has recently come back from the US Navy and a stint as a pilot in Vietnam. Now married to Lisa (Juliet Mills), a tragic accident on their honeymoon, results in his wife's death.

With Lisa's recent death, Kitty tries to console Taff but he is distraught and rebuffs her. In frustration, she seeks out Taff's rival, bad-boy pilot Hal Random (Jeremy Slate) and runs off with him. When her father and other male friends find out about the affair, they berate Kitty and make her feel so bad she wants to kill herself.

Flying her North American P-51 Mustang racing aircraft with the intention of crashing it, Kitty is followed by Taff in his Grumman F8F Bearcat, who tries to talk her out of it. His soothing words finally make an impression and help to bring Kitty back safely.

== Cast ==
- Suzanne Pleshette as Kitty Sanborn
- James Farentino as Taff Malloy
- Lloyd Nolan as Max Clarity
- Juliet Mills as Lisa
- Jeremy Slate as Hal Random
- Ralph Bellamy as Doug Sanborn
- Gary Crosby as Scott
- Jaime Sánchez as Luis Passos

== Production ==
Although Wings of Fire was set in Florida, the actual location shooting took place at Brackett Field, La Verne/Pamona, California. The aircraft seen in the film were: Douglas C-47J Skytrain, Republic RC-3-1 Seabee, North American P-51D Mustang, Grumman F8F Bearcat and LeVier Cosmic Wind. In the opening credits, Tallmantz Aviation Inc. and Frank Tallman as technical advisor are credited with working on the film.

== Reception ==
Film historians Jack Hardwick and Ed Schnepf in their listing of "A Viewer's Guide to Aviation Movies", dismissed Wings of Fire as, "This is it! Our nomination for the worst air movie ever made ... Sicky story of woman pilot and returned veteran with a hangup. One P-51D and one Bearcat, that's all.” In a similar review, aviation film historian Stephen Pendo considered Wings of Fire, "... below-average."

== See also ==
- Reno Air Races
