= Quintana (Hato Rey) =

- Subbarrio
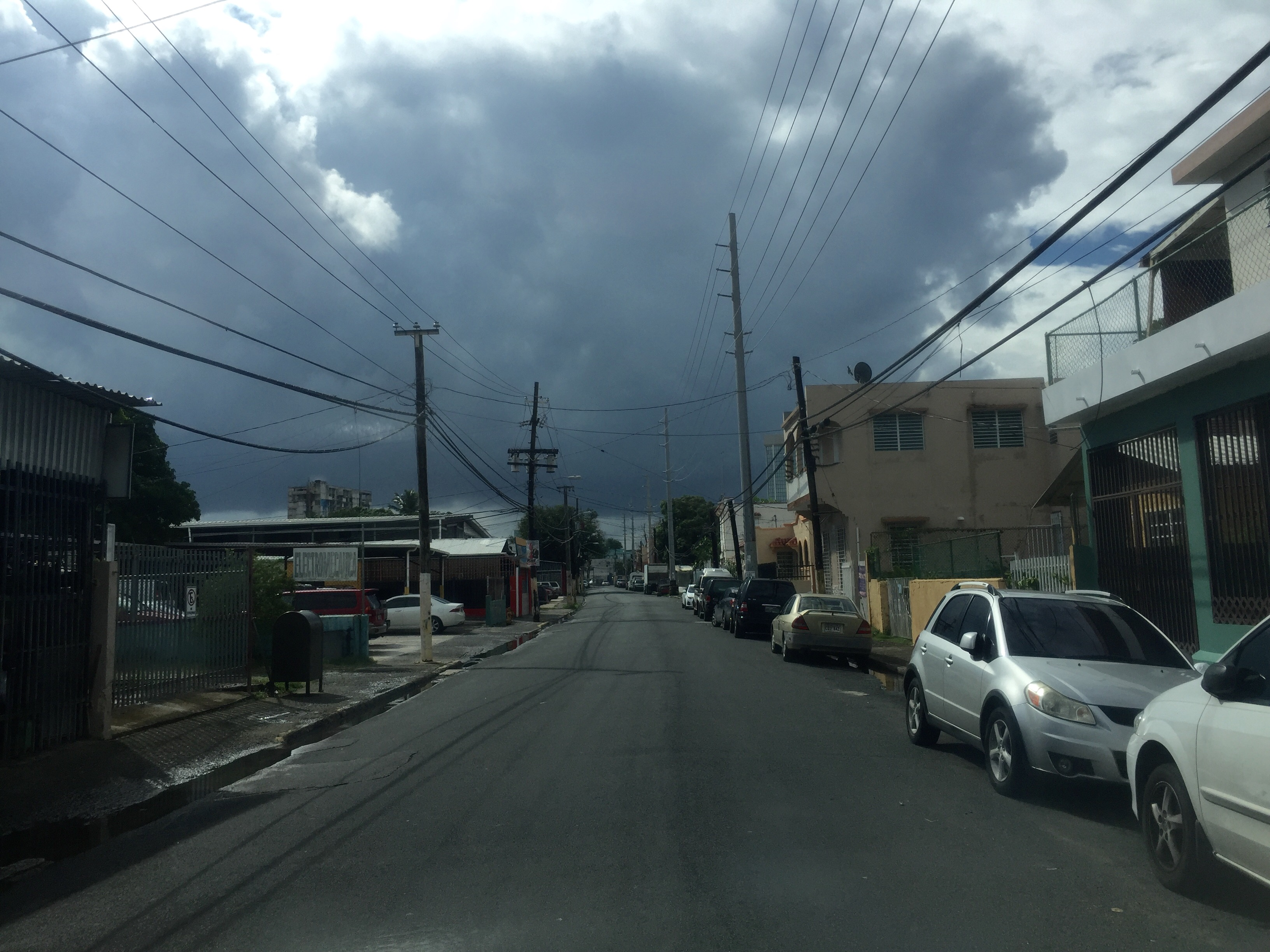

- Location within Puerto Rico
- Coordinates: 18°25′00″N 66°02′52″W
- Commonwealth: Puerto Rico
- Municipality: San Juan
- Barrio: Hato Rey Central

Area
  - Total: .42 sq mi (1.1 km^{2})
  - Land: .42 sq mi (1.1 km^{2})
- Elevation: 10 ft (3.0 m)

Population (2010)
  - Total: 7,542
  - Density: 17,957.1/sq mi (6,933.3/km^{2})
- Source: 2010 Census
- Time zone: UTC−4 (AST)

Quintana is a subbarrio, a legal subdivision of Hato Rey Central, a barrio in San Juan, Puerto Rico.
