= Hato Rey Central =

Barrio of San Juan, Puerto Rico

- Barrio
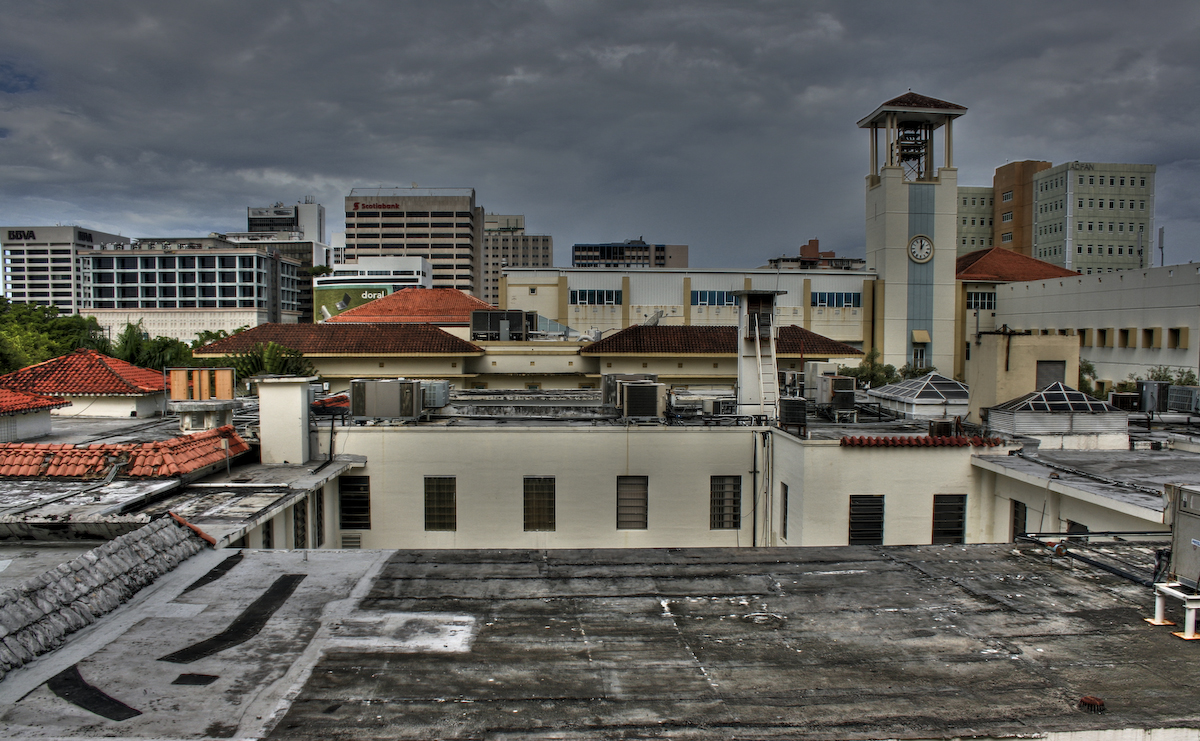
- Polytechnic University of Puerto Rico and the Milla de Oro in the background.

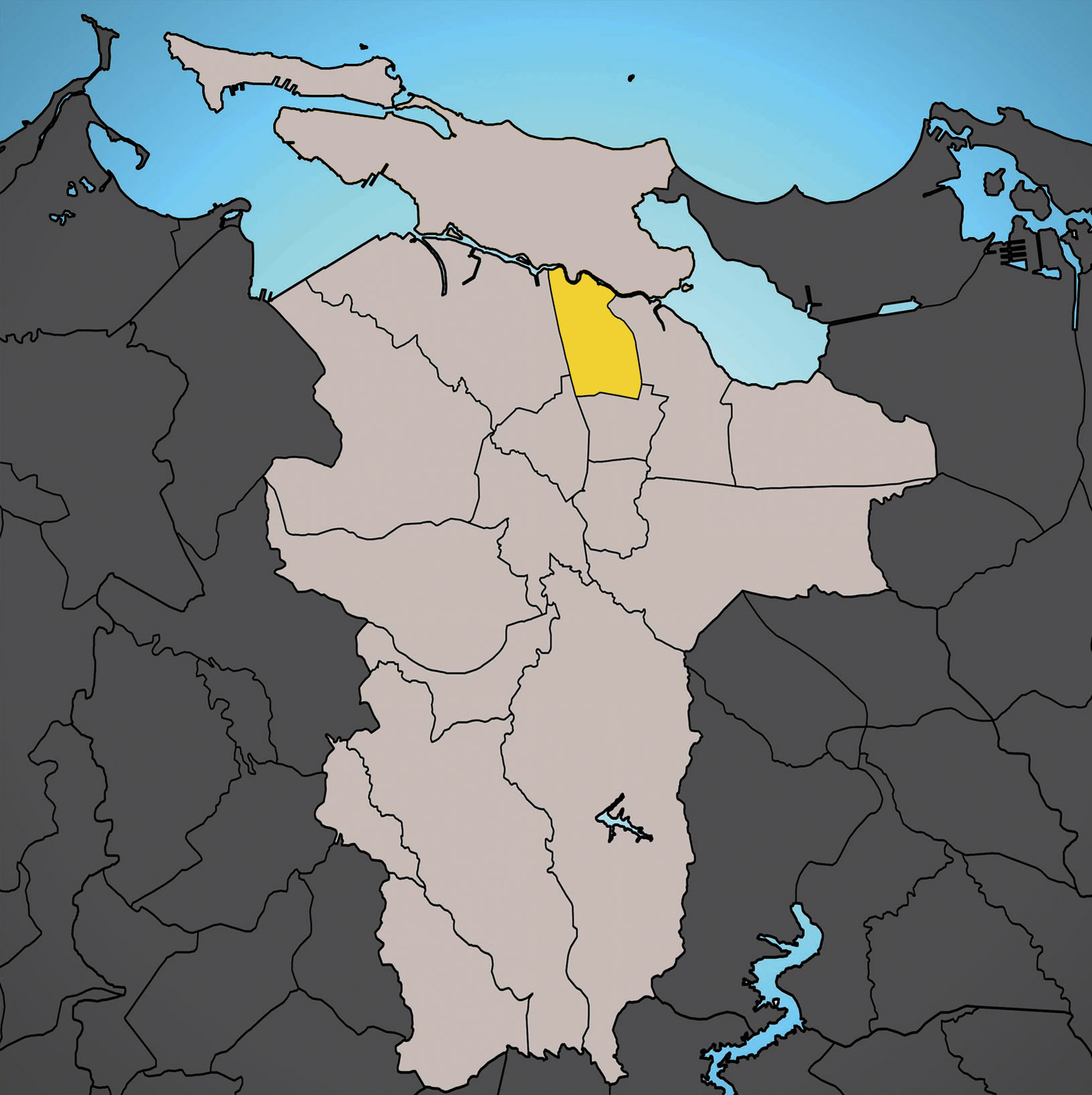
- Location of Hato Rey Central shown in yellow.
- Coordinates: 18°25′19″N 66°03′02″W
- Commonwealth: Puerto Rico
- Municipality: San Juan

Area
  - Total: 1.04 sq mi (2.7 km^{2})
  - Land: 1.03 sq mi (2.7 km^{2})
  - Water: 0.01 sq mi (0.026 km^{2})
- Elevation: 23 ft (7.0 m)

Population (2010)
  - Total: 16,640
  - Density: 16,155.3/sq mi (6,237.6/km^{2})
- 2010 census
- ZIP code: 00917

Hato Rey Central is one of the 18 barrios of the municipality of San Juan, Puerto Rico. It is one of three barrios commonly known together as Hato Rey. With a population density of 16,155.3 per square mile. It has a land area of 1.03 sq mi and a 2010 Census population of 16,640.

Hato Rey Central was a barrio of the former municipality of Río Piedras, before it was merged with San Juan in 1951.

It is bounded by Hato Rey Norte to the west, by barrio Universidad to the south, by Oriente to the east, and by Santurce to the north. The Caño Martín Peña separates Hato Rey Central from Santurce.

== Demographics ==
Historical population
Census	Pop.	Note	%±
1950	27,327		—
1960	28,745		5.2%
1970	28,327		−1.5%
1980	23,246		−17.9%
1990	22,504		−3.2%
2000	20,867		−7.3%
2010	16,640		−20.3%
U.S. Decennial Census; 1900 (N/A) 1910-1930; 1930-1950 1980-2000 2010

The population of the barrio in 2010 was 16,640, with a population density of 16,155 residents per square mile.

== Districts ==
The barrio of Hato Rey Central is further divided into 4 subbarrios, from north to south:

- Las Monjas
- Ciudad Nueva
- Floral Park
- Quintana
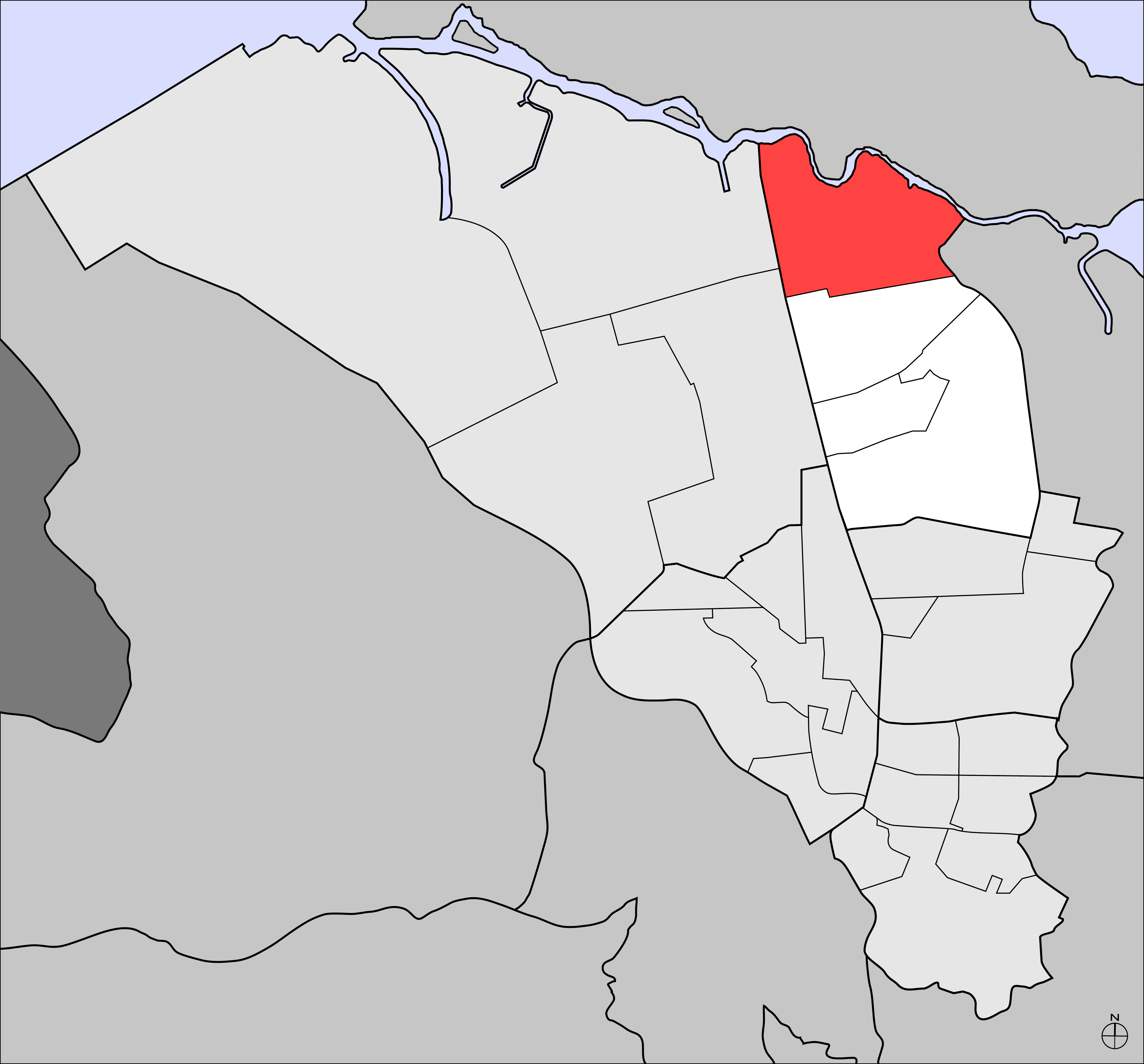
Las Monjas

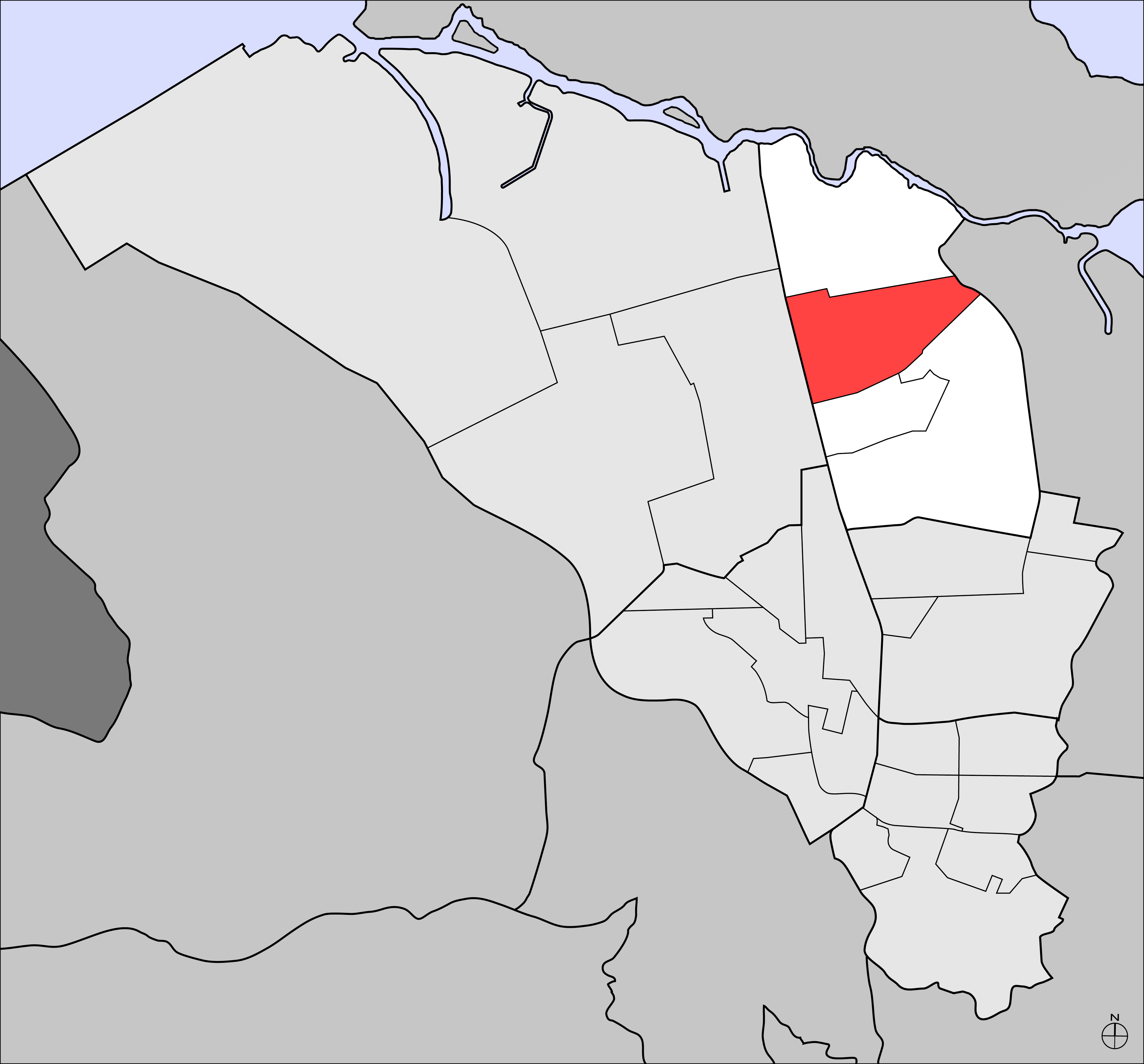
Ciudad Nueva

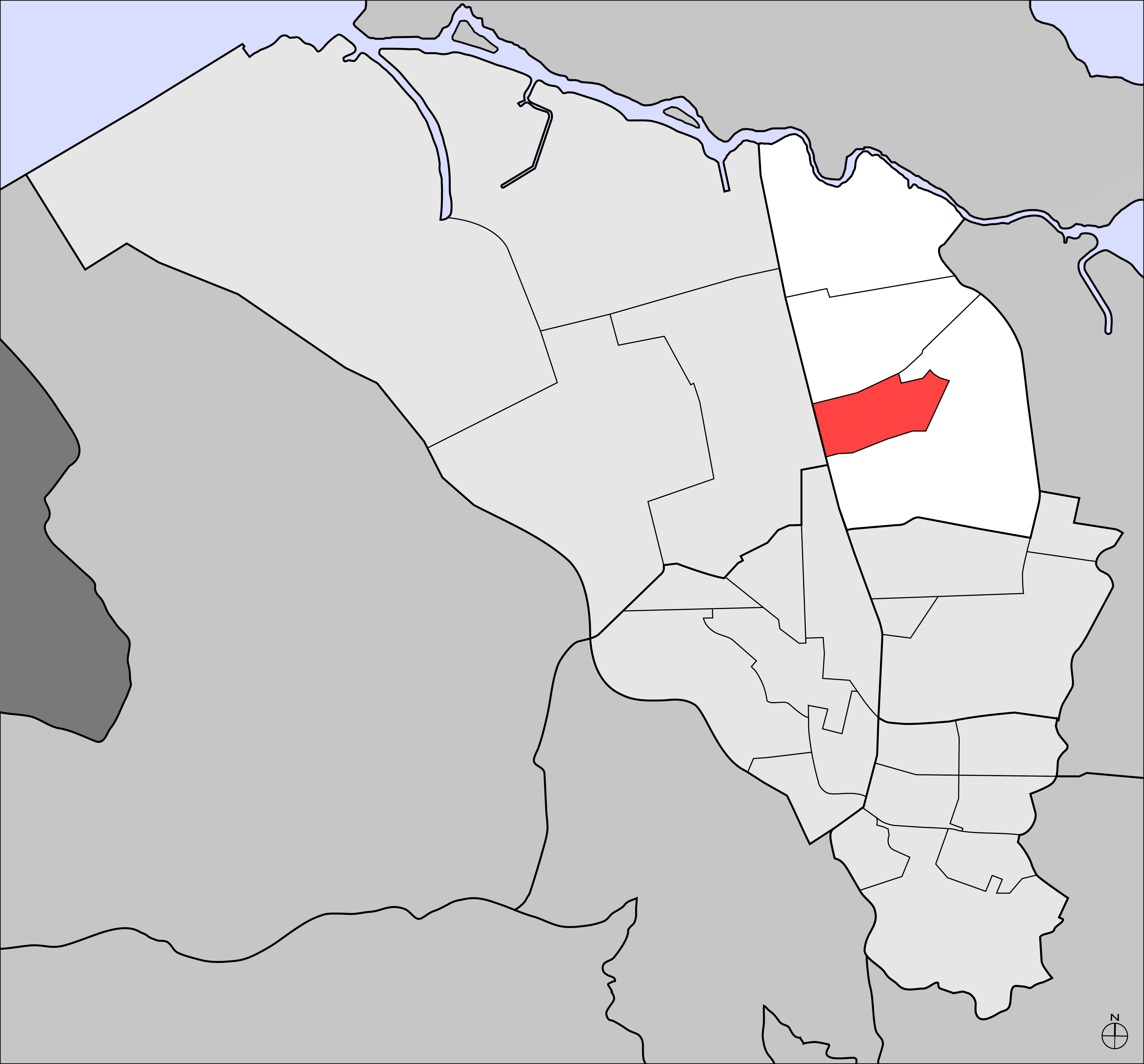
Floral Park

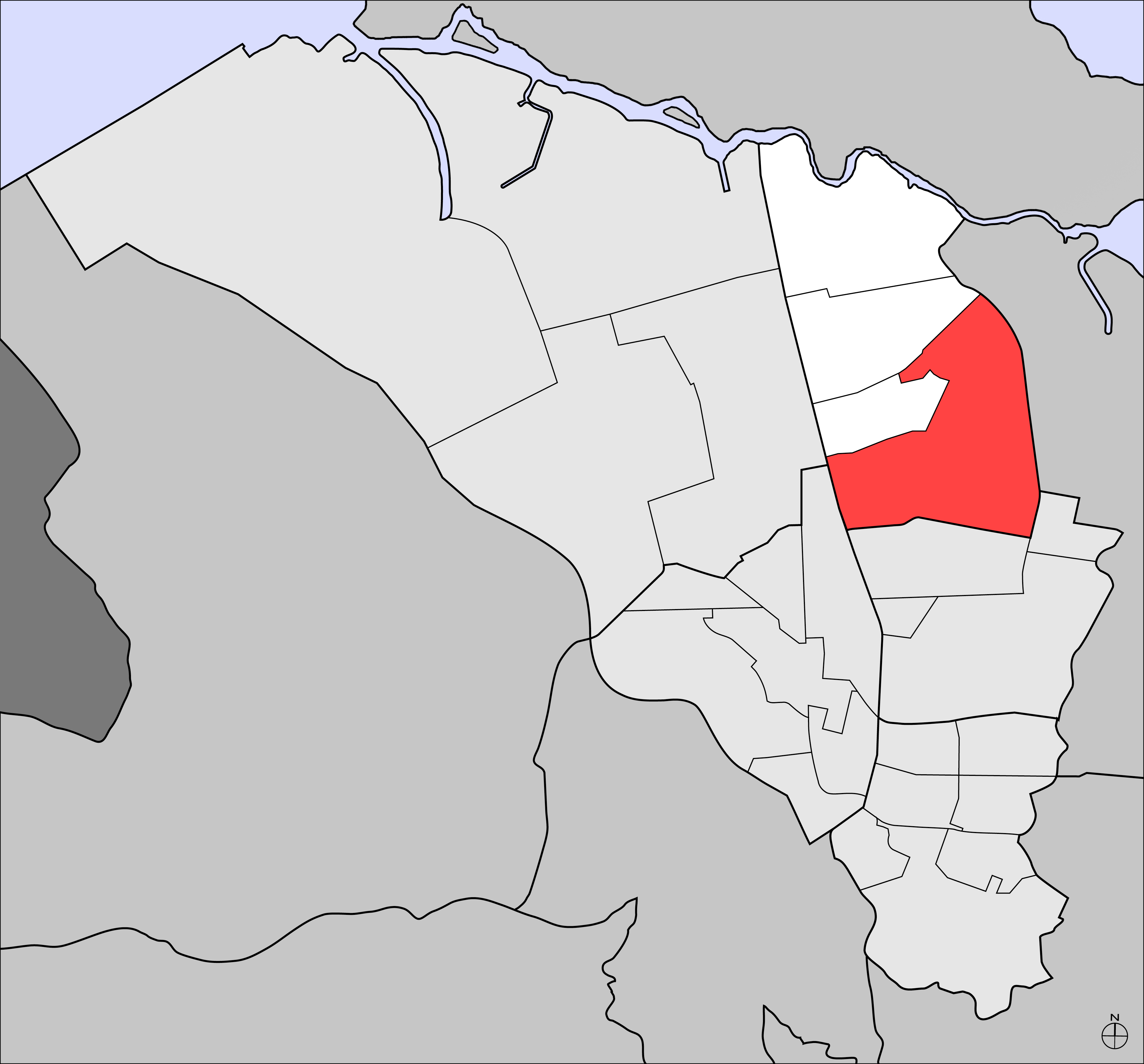
Quintana

== Landmarks and places of interest ==
- Martín Peña Bridge (shared with Hato Rey Norte), Art Deco-style bridge that connects Hato Rey Central with Santurce.
- Milla de Oro, the central business district of San Juan.
- Polytechnic University of Puerto Rico's main campus.

== Transportation ==
Although none of the Tren Urbano stations are technically located in Hato Rey Central, the Piñero, Domenech, Roosevelt and Hato Rey metro stations are located very close (in some cases even steps away) to the barrio. The area is also served by the Metropolitan Bus Authority (AMA).

== Gallery ==
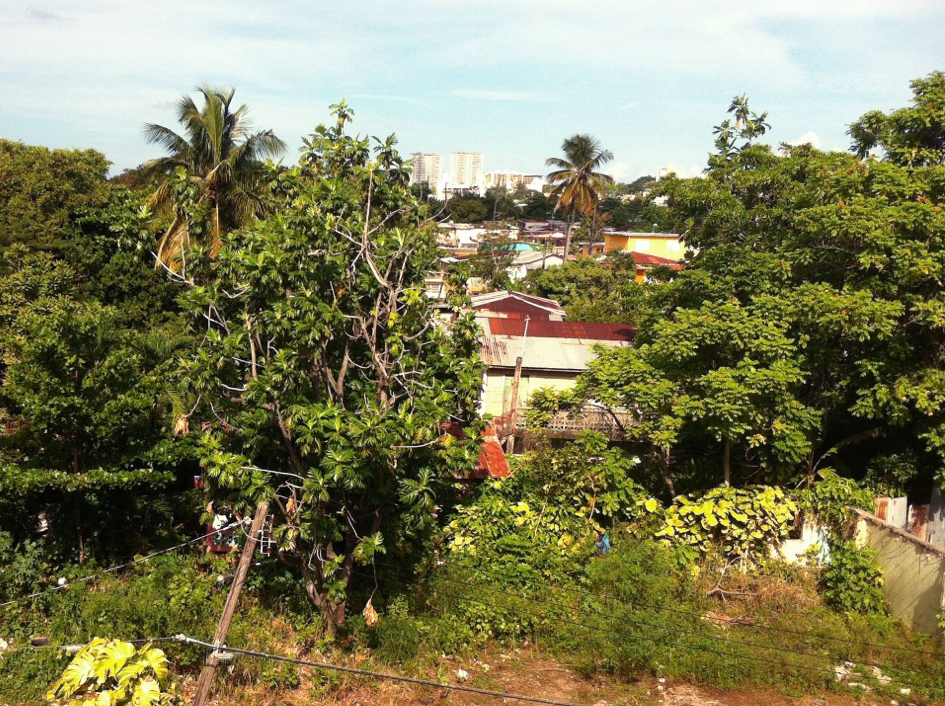
Las Monjas district.

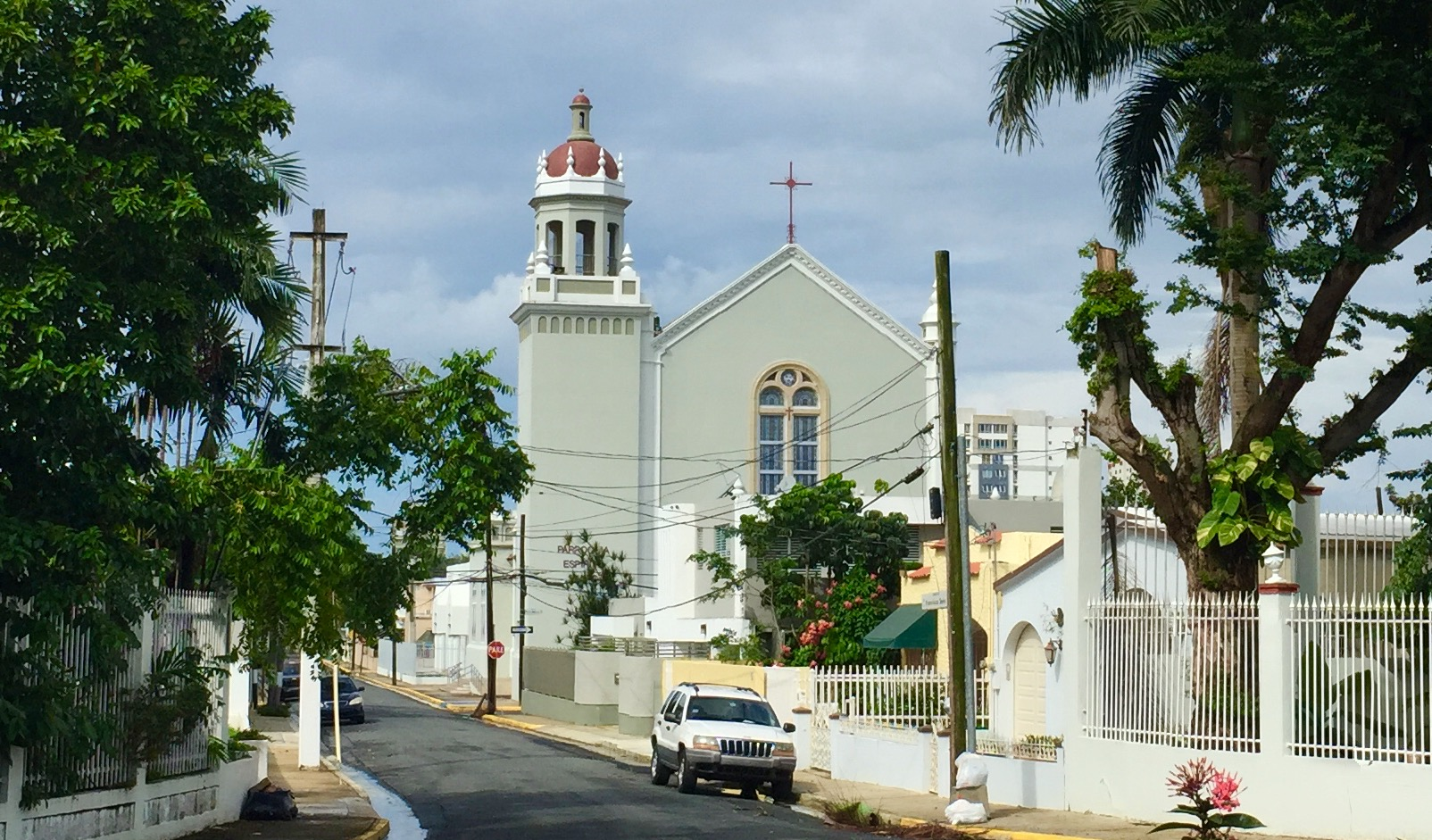
Espiritu Santo Parish in Floral Park district.

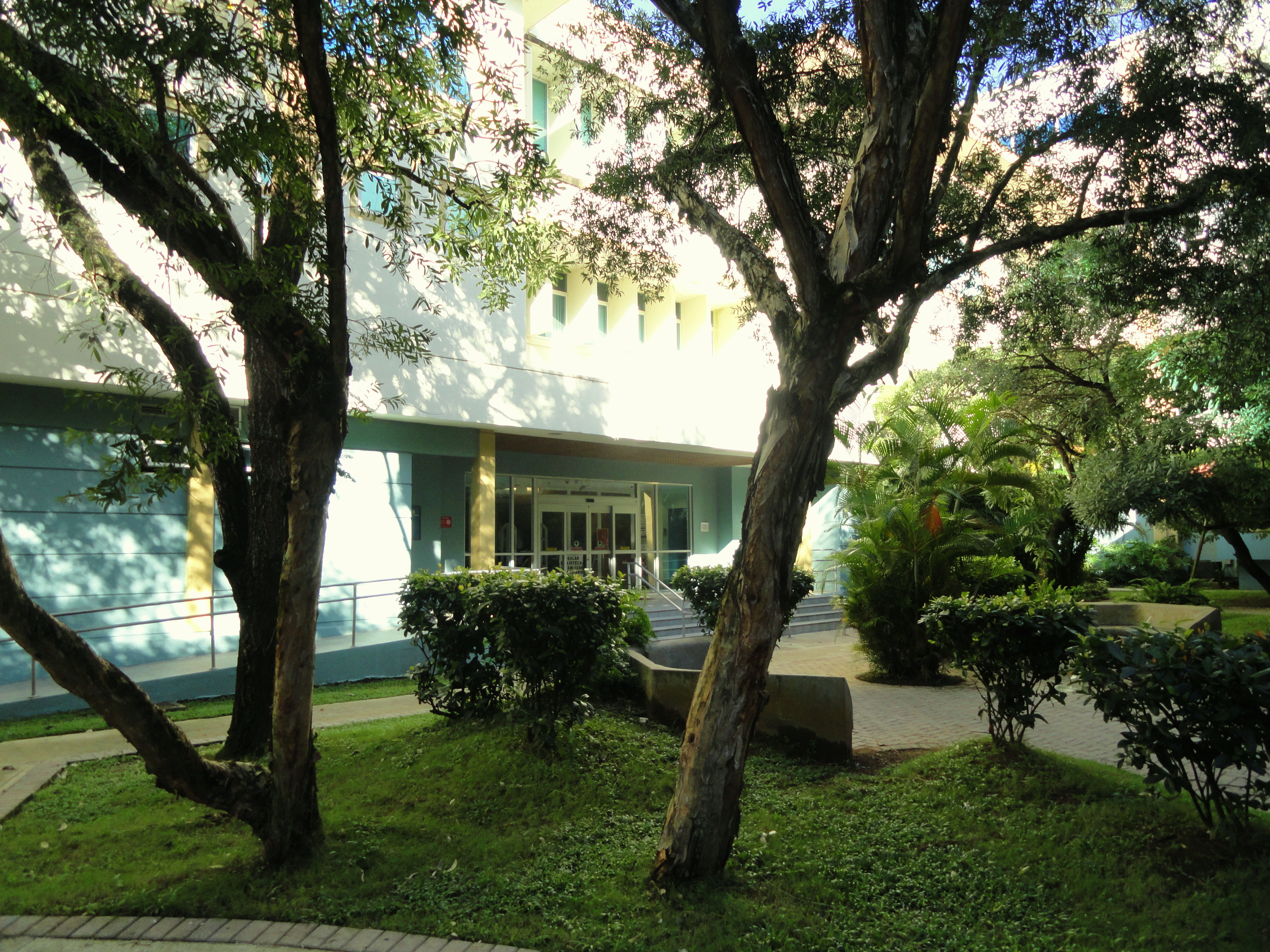
Polytechnic University Library

== See also ==
- Hato Rey
- List of communities in Puerto Rico
