= Ciudad Nueva (Hato Rey) =

Subbarrio in Puerto Rico

- Subbarrio
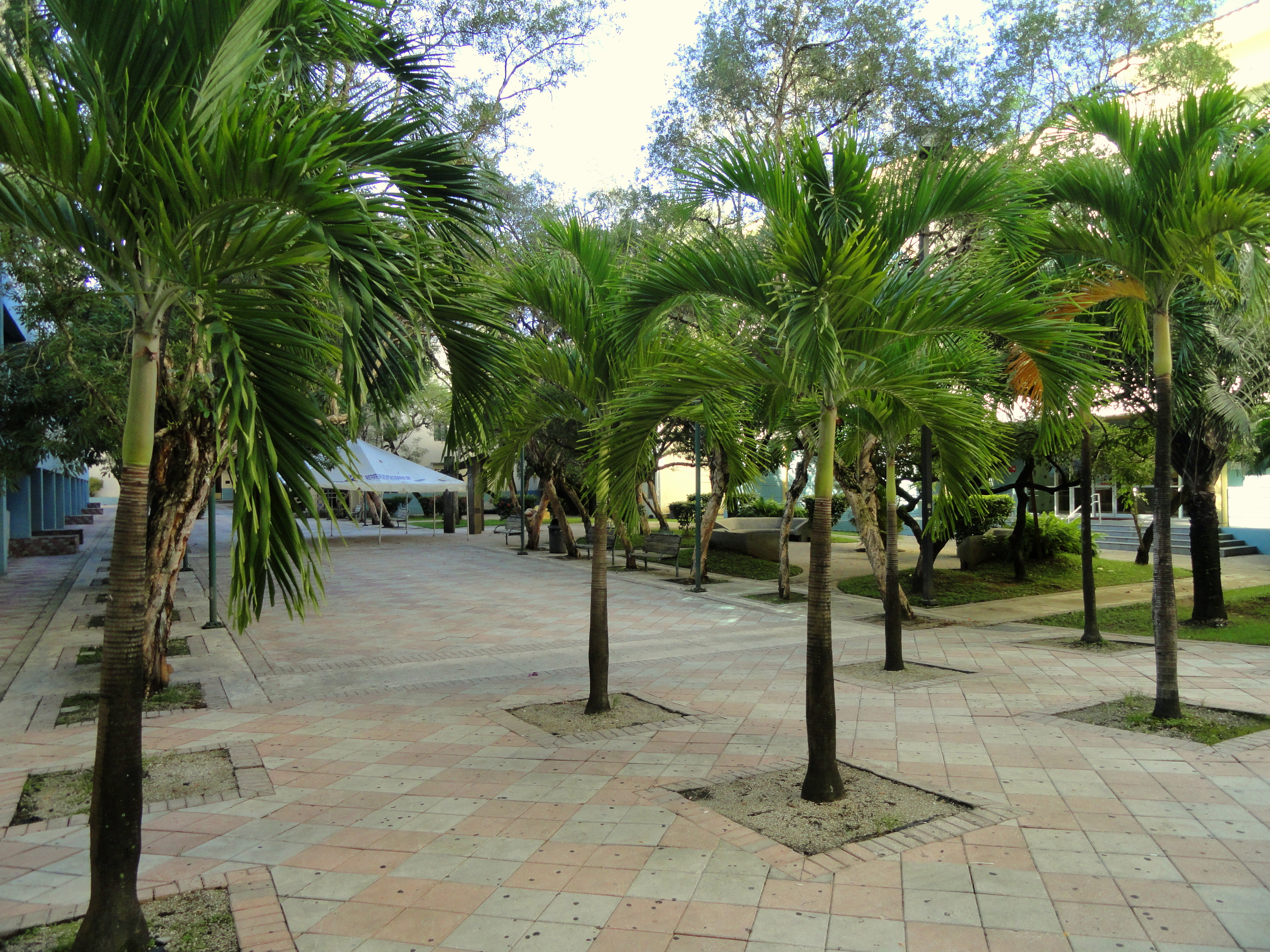
- Polytechnic University of Puerto Rico in Ciudad Nueva

- Location within Puerto Rico
- Coordinates: 18°25′22″N 66°03′10″W
- Commonwealth: Puerto Rico
- Municipality: San Juan
- Barrio: Hato Rey Central

Area
  - Total: .20 sq mi (0.52 km^{2})
  - Land: .20 sq mi (0.52 km^{2})
- Elevation: 23 ft (7.0 m)

Population (2010)
  - Total: 1,807
  - Density: 9,035/sq mi (3,488/km^{2})
- Source: 2010 Census
- Time zone: UTC−4 (AST)

Ciudad Nueva is a subbarrio, a legal subdivision of Hato Rey Central, a barrio in San Juan, Puerto Rico.
