= Florida Straits (film) =

1986 film by Mike Hodges

- Genre: Action; Adventure; Romance
- Screenplay by: Roderick Taylor
- Directed by: Mike Hodges
- Starring: Raul Julia; Fred Ward; Daniel Jenkins
- Music by: Michel Colombier
- Country of origin: United States
- Original language: English

Production
- Executive producer: Bob Cooper
- Producer: Stuart B. Rekant
- Cinematography: Dennis C. Lewiston
- Editor: Edward M. Abroms
- Running time: 97 minutes
- Production company: HBO Pictures

Original release
- Network: HBO
- Release: October 26, 1986

Florida Straits is a 1986 made-for-television adventure film that originally aired on HBO. It stars Fred Ward, Raul Julia, Daniel Jenkins and Antonio Fargas. The film had several theatrical releases in other countries as well as video premieres in later years but it originally aired in 1986. The production was filmed in South Carolina standing in for Cuba in the 1980s. It was one of a number of 1980s adventure films with a heist theme.

== Plot ==
"Lucky" (Fred Ward) operates a for-charter sight-seeing boat in the Florida Keys. He keeps company with salty gambling and drinking barroom types. One day a young man, Mac (Daniel Jenkins), recently from college shows up and enters into a poker game with Lucky. Mac is proficient at cards which belies his youthful looks. Lucky, unable to pay Mac, eventually ends up in a partnership with the young man and the two of them now share Lucky's boat The White Witch.

As time goes on, a political prisoner from Cuba, called Carlos (Raul Julia), lands in Miami. He has been imprisoned by Fidel Castro since 1961 and was a DC-3 pilot during the planned Bay of Pigs Invasion. Carlos eventually meets Lucky and Mac and persuades them to use their boat White Witch to take him back to Cuba. Carlos has two reasons to return to Cuba, a lost lady love (Ilka Tanya Payán) whom he thinks is still waiting for him after twenty years and a crate of gold coins he parachuted from the DC-3 just before he bailed out of the aircraft in 1961. The three end up in Cuba and face a band of rebels led by "El Gato Negro" (Antonio Fargas).

== Cast ==
- Raul Julia as Carlos Jayne
- Fred Ward as "Lucky" Boone
- Daniel Jenkins as Mac
- Jaime Sánchez as Innocente
- Victor Argo as Pablo Cheruka
- Ilka Tanya Payán as Carmen
- Antonio Fargas as "El Gato Negro"
- Jesse Corti as Guido
- Raúl Dávila as Esteban
- Ed Grady as Lenny
