= A Step Away =

1980 documentary film chronicling the VIIIth Pan American Games

- Directed by: Roberto Ponce; Co-director: Marcos Zurinaga
- Produced by: Roberto Ponce
- Narrated by: Orson Welles (English); Carlos Montalban (Spanish)
- Distributed by: A Step Away, LLC.
- Release date: 1980
- Running time: 140 minutes
- Countries: Puerto Rico; Canada; United States
- Language: Spanish/English

A Step Away is an Official Olympic Film, a documentary filmed during the VIIIth Pan American Games held in San Juan, Puerto Rico, from July 1 to July 15, 1979. It was produced and directed by Roberto Ponce and co-directed by Marcos Zurinaga. The English language narrator was Orson Welles; Carlos Montalban narrated the Spanish version. The film was remastered in 2010.

== Synopsis ==
Documentary focus on the performance of various elite athletes during the Pan American Games held in San Juan, Puerto Rico. Athletes showcased in the documentary include US team swimmer of Puerto Rican origin Jesse Vassallo; legendary Cuban track and field athlete Alberto Juantorena; Mexican diver Carlos Girón; American diver, Greg Louganis; and the Puerto Rico national basketball team, among others. Puerto Rican Basketball player Roberto Valderas sang the team's rap anthem in the film. At the end of the movie, these athletes expressed their hopes of being "a step away" from the 1980 Olympic Games; however, these hopes were shattered by the political crisis and the eventual USA-led boycott of the Olympic Games held in Moscow in 1980.
