= Floral Park (Hato Rey) =

- Subbarrio
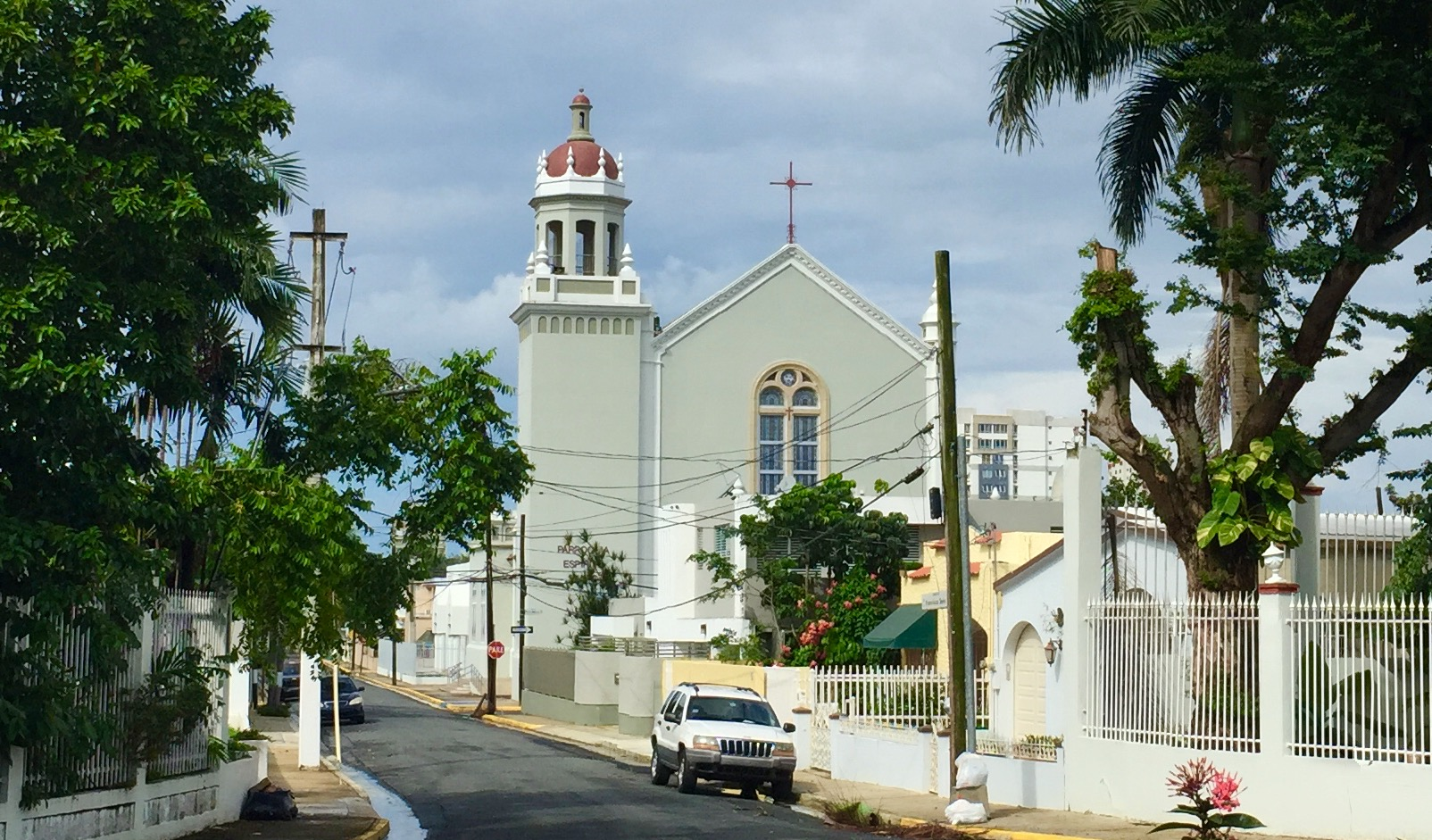
- Parroquia Espiritu Santo in Floral Park

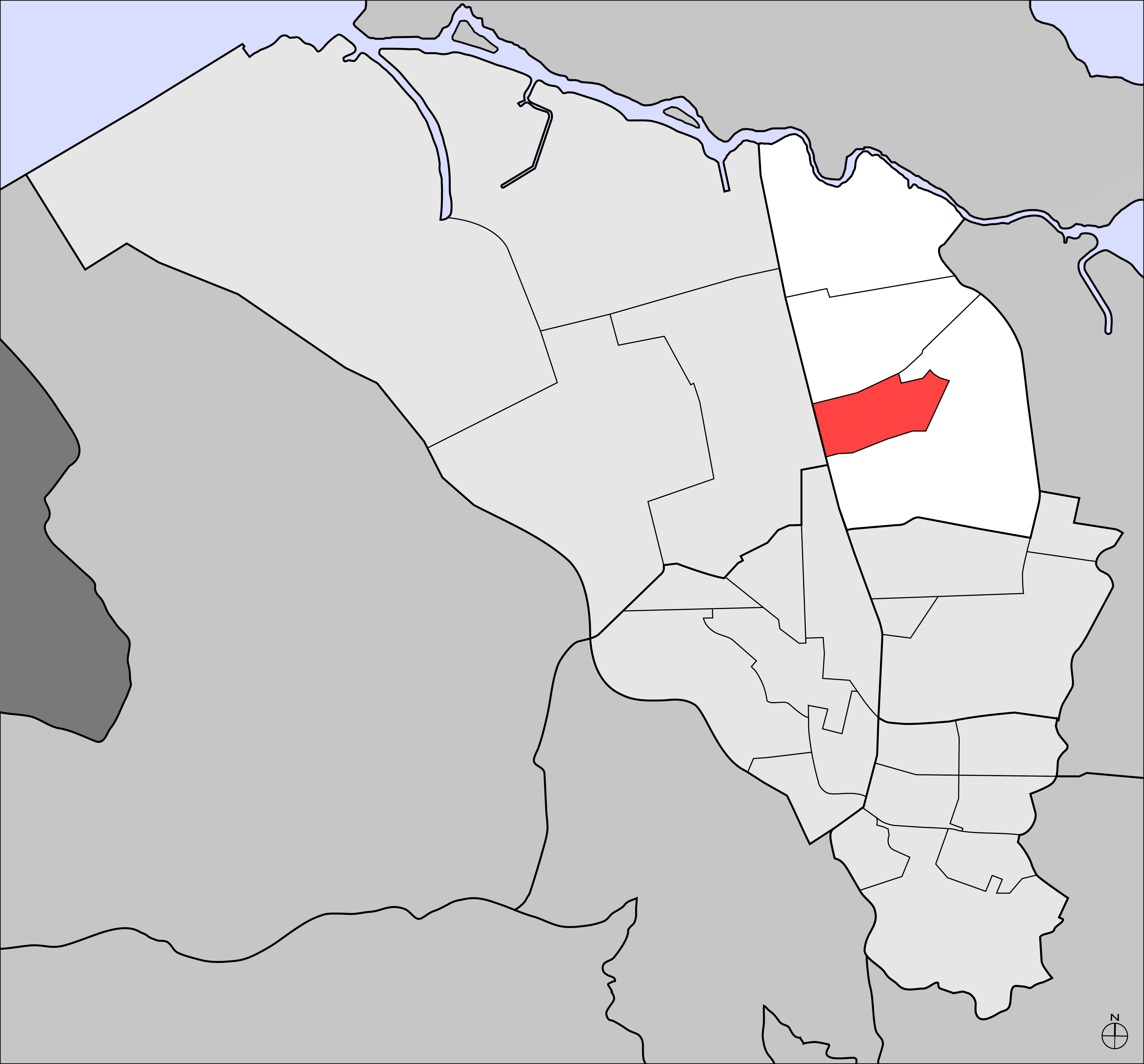
- Floral Park (red) within Hato Rey Central (white) and Hato Rey (light gray)

- Location within Puerto Rico
- Coordinates: 18°25′06″N 66°03′08″W
- Commonwealth: Puerto Rico
- Municipality: San Juan
- Barrio: Hato Rey Central

Area
  - Total: .10 sq mi (0.26 km^{2})
  - Land: .10 sq mi (0.26 km^{2})
- Elevation: 23 ft (7.0 m)

Population (2010)
  - Total: 1,273
  - Density: 12,730/sq mi (4,920/km^{2})
- Source: 2010 Census
- Time zone: UTC−4 (AST)

Floral Park is a subbarrio, a legal subdivision of Hato Rey Central, a barrio in San Juan, Puerto Rico.

It was formerly one of 12 sectors in Hato Rey before it was subdivided into Hato Rey Norte, Hato Rey Central and Hato Rey Sur.

In the 1950s, this area was known for its horse racing with 3 tracks (Las Casas, Las Monjas and Quintana), nearby.
