= Roberto Gándara =

Spanish association football player

Personal information
- Full name: Roberto Gándara González
- Date of birth: 16 April 1990 (age 36)
- Place of birth: Salamanca, Spain
- Height: 1.78 m (5 ft 10 in)
- Position: Midfielder

Team information
- Current team: Santa Marta
- Number: 10

Youth career
- Salamanca

Senior career*
Years	Team	Apps	(Gls)
2009–2012	Salamanca B	56	(12)
2012–2015	Arenas de Getxo	72	(11)
2015–2016	Badajoz	33	(5)
2016–2018	Talavera	67	(18)
2018–2019	Podbeskidzie	19	(3)
2019–2020	Portugalete	20	(1)
2020–2023	Palencia	78	(19)
2023–	Santa Marta	8	(1)
- * Club domestic league appearances and goals as of 16 April 2024

Roberto Gándara González (born 16 April 1990) is a Spanish professional footballer who plays for Santa Marta as a midfielder.

== Club career ==
Born in Salamanca, Gándara graduated from the youth academy of local UD Salamanca and made his debut for the reserves in 2009–10 season, in Tercera División. After a stint with Arenas Club de Getxo in the same tier (securing promotion to Segunda División B), he signed for CD Badajoz on a one-year contract on 18 July 2015.

On 16 July 2016, Gándara switched to CF Talavera de la Reina. At the end of the 2016–17 season, the club won promotion to Segunda División B. On 30 June 2018, he moved abroad for the first time in his career and joined Polish I liga club Podbeskidzie Bielsko-Biała.
