= Rubén Juárez =

Argentine musician (1947–2010)

- Born: Jorge Rubén Juárez; 5 November 1947; Ballesteros, Córdoba Province, Argentina
- Died: 31 May 2010 (aged 62) Buenos Aires, Argentina
- Genres: Tango
- Occupations: Bandoneonist, singer-songwriter
- Instruments: Vocals, bandoneón
- Years active: 1969–2010
- Label: Sello Odeón (firsts recordings)
- Formerly of: Raúl Garello, Raúl Luzzi, Eladia Blázquez

Rubén Juárez (5 November 1947 – 31 May 2010) was an Argentine bandoneonist and singer-songwriter of tango.

== Early life ==
Rubén Juárez was born on 5 November 1947 in Ballesteros, in the province of Córdoba and was raised in Avellaneda (south of Greater Buenos Aires). Juárez studied the bandoneón from the age of six. In 1956, he entered the Youth Orchestra of Club Atlético Independiente. His corresponding studies of the guitar during his youth led him to integrate various rock bands into his repertoire.

== Music career ==
Years later he met the guitarist Héctor Arbello around the time that they both played together with Julio Sosa. Subsequently, they formed a duo with, and they began to tour around the country. When the bandoneonist Aníbal Troilo (1914–1975) went to watch him the first time, Rubén asked him to be his artistic godfather. On 2 June 1969 he recorded his first song with the label Odeón Para vos, canilla, and that was an immediate success. After a year, he was recruited by Nicolás Mancera to sing on his TV program Sábados Circulares. Since that time, he has acted in Argentina and abroad, and recorded songs with artists like Armando Pontier, Charly García, Pedro Aznar, Leopoldo Federico, Raúl Garello, Litto Nebbia, the guitarist Roberto Grela and José Colángelo. In later years he worked with the master Raúl Luzzi.

== Illness and death ==
In 2002, he moved with his family to Villa Carlos Paz (35 km away from Córdoba (city). In 2008, he was diagnosed with prostate cancer which obligated him to undergo chemotherapy sessions every three weeks in the city of Córdoba. In April 2010, it was discovered that the cancer had metastasized to his bones. On the night of 28 May 2010, the actor and broadcaster Coco Sily interrupted his program Animales Sueltos to ask for Actor's House to send an ambulance to take him from Villa Carlos Paz to Buenos Aires, since he had suffered a decompensation that forced him to leave his home.

He died from prostate cancer on 31 May 2010 in Buenos Aires in the Güemes Sanatorium.
