= Premio Biblioteca Breve =

- Awarded for: Unpublished novel
- Sponsored by: Seix Barral (Grupo Planeta)
- Date: 14 June 1958
- Location: Barcelona, Spain
- Presented by: Seix Barral
- Reward: €30,000

The Premio Biblioteca Breve is a literary award given annually by the publisher Seix Barral (now part of Grupo Planeta) to an unpublished novel in the Spanish language. Its prize is €30,000 and publication of the winning work. It is delivered in February, to a work from the preceding year.

== History ==
On 14 June 1958, a jury comprising literary critics Josep Maria Castellet and José María Valverde, and editors Víctor Seix (editorial director), Juan Petit (literary director) and Carlos Barral (director of the collection), gave the inaugural award in Sitges, Barcelona. As stated by members of the jury, it was intended to encourage young writers and the renewal of Spanish literature.

Due to the death of Juan Petit in January 1964 (replaced as literary director by Gabriel Ferrater), the exile of José María Valverde to Canada in 1967, and the death of Víctor Seix in October of that year, the jury was joined by Salvador Clotas, Luis Goytisolo, and Juan García Hortelano for subsequent editions. The bases were also modified: for a few years the award took Petit's name as a tribute. In the same way, the Spanish political situation dictated that, in some editions, eligibility was extended to any Iberian Romance language, although no works in Catalan or Portuguese were awarded.

The 1971 edition's jury comprised Luis Goytisolo, Juan Rulfo, Joan Ferraté i Soler, and Pere Gimferrer, with Guillermo Cabrera Infante joining in 1972. However, in 1973 the award ceased to be given due to numerous internal factors (dissensions within the publisher) and external factors (problems with censorship).

In 1998, Basilio Baltasar, the new literary director of Seix Barral (by this time part of Grupo Planeta), decided to reconvene the prize, with the aim of recovering the spirit with which it was born, trying to recognize both Spanish and Latin American authors.

== First era winners (1958–1972) ==
- 1958 – Las afueras by Luis Goytisolo (Spain)
- 1959 – Nuevas amistades by Juan García Hortelano (Spain)
- 1960 – Declared vacant; finalists were Encerrados con un solo juguete by Juan Marsé (Spain), La criba by Daniel Sueiro (Spain), and Los extraordinarios by Ana Mairena (Mexico)
- 1961 – Dos días de setiembre by José Manuel Caballero (Spain)
- 1962 – The Time of the Hero by Mario Vargas Llosa (Peru)
- 1963 – Los albañiles by Vicente Leñero (Mexico)
- 1964 – Vista de amanecer en el trópico (Note: In exile he would rework the novel as Tres tristes tigres (lit. 'Three Sad Tigers'), and the same title was later given to a book of vignettes.) by Guillermo Cabrera Infante (Cuba)
- 1965 – Últimas tardes con Teresa by Juan Marsé (Spain)
  - Finalist: Betrayed by Rita Hayworth by Manuel Puig (Argentina)
- 1966 – Not given
- 1967 – A Change of Skin (Note: Not published in Spain, and published in Mexico by Joaquín Mortiz.) by Carlos Fuentes (Mexico)
  - Finalist: El mercurio by José María Guelbenzu (Spain)
- 1968 – País portátil by Adriano González León (Venezuela)
- 1969 – Una meditación by Juan Benet
- 1970 – Due to internal problems at the publisher, no award was given in this edition. It would have gone to The Obscene Bird of Night by José Donoso (Chile).
- 1971 – Sonámbulo del sol by Nivaria Tejera (Cuba)
- 1972 – La circuncisión del señor solo by José Leyva (Spain)

== Second era winners (1999–present) ==
Year	Novel	Author	Nationality	ISBN.	Ref.
1999	En busca de Klingsor	Jorge Volpi	Mexican	9780061626722	
2000	Los impacientes	Gonzalo Garcés	Argentine	9788432210648	
2001	Velódromo de invierno	Juana Salabert	Spanish	9788420684437	
2002	Satanás	Mario Mendoza	Colombian	9789584226365	
2003	Los príncipes nubios	Juan Bonilla	Spanish	9788432217876	
2004	La burla del tiempo	Mauricio Electorat	Chilean	9788432211799	
2005	Una palabra tuya	Elvira Lindo	Spanish	9788432290091	
2006	La segunda mujer	Luisa Castro	Spanish	9788432217609	
2007	El séptimo velo	Juan Manuel de Prada	Spanish	9780061626692	
2008	El infinito en la palma de la mano	Gioconda Belli	Nicaraguan	9780062242006	
2009	Corazón de napalm	Clara Usón	Spanish	9788432225611	
2010	El oficinista	Guillermo Saccomanno	Argentine	9788432291227	
2011	Leonora	Elena Poniatowska	Mexican	9781846688553	
2012	El jardín colgante	Javier Calvo	Spanish	9788432209949	
2013	Música de cámara	Rosa Regàs	Spanish	9788432219436	
2014	Ávidas pretensiones	Fernando Aramburu	Spanish	9788432222863	
2015	La isla del padre	Fernando Marías Amondo	Spanish	9788432224850	
2016	El Sistema	Ricardo Menéndez Salmón	Spanish	9788432229244	
2017	A cielo abierto	Antonio Iturbe	Spanish	9788432232480	
2018	Trilogía de la guerra	Agustín Fernández Mallo	Spanish	9788432233784	
2019	Días sin ti	Elvira Sastre	Spanish	9788432234958	
2020	Noche y océano	Raquel Taranilla	Spanish	9788432236549	
2021	Trigo limpio	Juan Gil Navarro	Spanish	9788432237911	
2022	Lugar seguro	Isaac Rosa	Spanish	9788432239830	
2023	La educación física	Rosario Villajos	Spanish	9788432241840	
2024	Elogio de las manos	Jesús Carrasco	Spanish	9788432243318	
2025	El vuelo del hombre	Benjamín G. Rosado	Spanish	9788432244544	
