= Pozzetto massacre =

1986 spree killing in Bogotá, Colombia

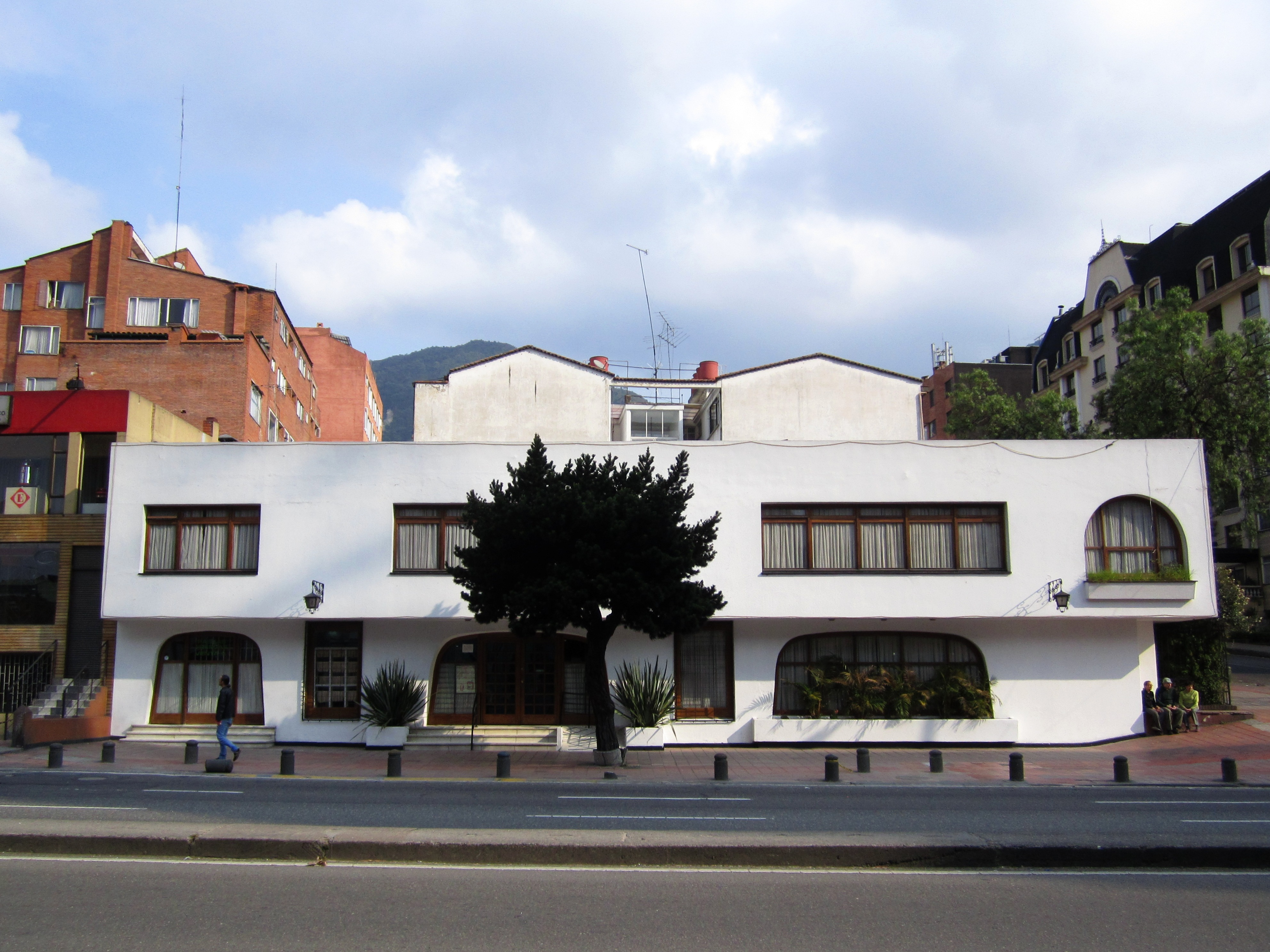
- Restaurant Pozzetto, the main location of the massacre, in 2013
- Native name: Masacre de Pozzetto
- Location: Bogotá, Colombia
- Date: 4 December 1986; 39 years ago 2:00 p.m. – 9:30 p.m. (COT)
- Attack type: Mass shooting, stabbing
- Weapons: Smith & Wesson Model 31-1; Hunting knife
- Deaths: 30 (27 by gunfire including the perpetrator and 3 by stabbing)
- Injuries: 11 (10 by gunfire)
- Perpetrator: Campo Elías Delgado

The Pozzetto massacre was carried out by 52-year-old Campo Elías Delgado at three locations in eastern Bogotá, Colombia on 4 December 1986. Over the course of seven hours, 29 people were killed and 11 others were injured.

Delgado first murdered nine people, including his mother, at two apartment buildings, luring some out by triggering the fire alarm system. Afterwards, he went to the upscale Restaurant Pozzetto, where Delgado opened fire on customers and staff, killing 20 people before being shot dead by police. It is currently the deadliest shooting by a lone gunman in the country's history.

== Incident ==
=== Preparation ===
On 3 December 1986, around noon, Delgado entered the Banco de Bogotá to close his bank account and withdraw his entire deposits of COP$49,896.93. When the cashier handed him a round number of COP$49,896.50, Delgado insisted on receiving the remaining 43 cents. Either during the afternoon of the same day, or the next morning, Delgado bought a .32-caliber Smith & Wesson Model 31-1 revolver and 500 rounds of ammunition.

=== Apartment buildings ===
On 4 December, at approximately 2:00 p.m., Delgado went to an apartment building at Calle 118 No. 40–11 in the La Alhambra barrio of Usaquén and entered apartment 304, where Nora Becerra de Rincón lived with her teenage daughter Claudia Rincón, to whom Delgado had given lessons in English, as well as her 11-year-old son Julio Eduardo, her mother, and her mother's friend. Only Nora and Claudia were at home when Delgado arrived. Delgado gagged and handcuffed Nora, placing her on the couch in the living room before stabbing her nine times in the neck and chest with a hunting knife. He also gagged Claudia and bound her hands and feet before stabbing her 22 times in the back and left side of the chest, leaving her dead on a bed. Both died from hypovolemic shock as a result of the stab wounds. Nora's sister tried to call them about Claudia's upcoming First Communion, but did not report them missing. Julio found the bodies the next day, after spending the day locked out of the apartment until a locksmith picked open the door. Their murders were not initially connected to Delgado's later killings.

At 4:00 p.m., Delgado was back at the apartment he shared with his mother at Carrera 7, Calle 52 in Chapinero. Around 5:30 p.m., after a heated argument with her, he walked up behind Rita Delgado and killed her with a single stab to the back of the neck, afterwards wrapping her body in newspapers, sprinkling it with gasoline, and setting it on fire. Delgado then grabbed his revolver and a briefcase containing five boxes of ammunition and the knife, and ran through the apartment complex screaming "Fire! Fire!" He went downstairs and rang at apartment 301, where students Inés Gordi Galat and Nelsy Patricia Cortés were living, saying that he needed to call the fire department. As soon as they opened the door, Delgado killed both women with single shots to the head and then proceeded to apartment 302, where he did the same with Gloria Isabel Agudelo León, who had been alarmed by the shooting and opened the door to investigate.

Delgado then headed down to the first floor where he rang at apartment 101, again pretending that he needed to call the fire department. The apartment was occupied by four women, Mrs. Berta Gómez, who saved her life by jumping out into the courtyard, as well as students Matilde Rocío González, Mercedes Gamboa, and Claudia del Pilar Bermúdez Durán, who were all shot. With Delgado still screaming "fire, fire," the door was opened by Claudia del Pilar Bermúdez, who turned towards the kitchen to get him a wet cloth. When she turned around, Delgado shot her in the back of the head. González, who had already picked up the telephone receiver, and Gamboa both died at the scene, while Claudia Bermúdez died a few hours later in Hospital San José.

Outside the building, Delgado stood still for about ten minutes, staring at a poster advertising a play of Blood Wedding at a local theater, which was witnessed by a resident's relative, Blanca Agudelo de González. Meanwhile, Berta Gómez flagged down a police patrol to ask them for help, but the car did not stop. Gómez then approached a security booth of the Army Health Directorate across the building, but seeing the fire on the fourth floor, the two posted officers responded that this was more a case for the firefighters and therefore did not intervene.

Just after 5:30 p.m., Delgado left for house number 201 at Carrera 28A No. 51–31, where the Castro family was living, with whom he had been friends for five years. He arrived there about 15 minutes later in a rather agitated state. The Castros were surprised to see Delgado in a formal suit, as he usually wore short-sleeved shirts, even in the cold season. Against his habit of being a man of rather few words, Delgado talked incessantly, repeated sentences several times, and paced through the living room, declining any of Mrs. Castro's invitations to sit down. She had seen the outline of Delgado's gun in his pants, but thought nothing of it since he had started carrying one for self-protection. According to Clemencia de Castro, Delgado told her that he had come to say farewell, as he had bought a one-way ticket and would go on a trip to the United States or China.

At 6:45 p.m., Delgado left the Castros, assuring them that they would soon hear from him, and went to Restaurante Pozzetto, an Italian restaurant opened in 1976 at Carrera 7, No. 61-24 - in the same district where he ate frequently, discarding the hunting knife on his way. By that time police and journalists were searching for the murderer throughout the city. Most television broadcasts were interrupted to report on the murders committed at the apartment building at Calle 51, having already identified Delgado through the description by the doorman, although reporting only three dead at the time.

=== Restaurant Pozzetto ===
Delgado arrived at the restaurant at around 7:15 p.m. While he always chose to be seated at table 5, this time he sat down at table 20, possibly to get a better view on the other diners. Because Delgado was dressed formally with a suitcase and typically didn't visit on weekdays, his usual waiter, Alfonso Guaneme, asked if it was his birthday, to which Delgado responded that he was celebrating "something very personal". He ordered his usual meal, spaghetti bolognese, but instead of his drink of choice, Colombiana cola, Delgado uncharacteristically ordered alcohol, a half bottle of red wine. While waiting, he had a minor argument with some present children, who mocked his disheveled appearance, facial features, and balding hair. The waiters noticed that during his meal Delgado went to the restroom several times. After finishing his meal, he ordered dessert, read an American magazine, ordered two screwdriver cocktails, and paid his bill, telling the attending waiter, Ecce Homo Rosas, that he would compose a poem for his service. As usual, Delgado gave a large tip to Guaneme, who offered Delgado a third vodka on the house. Delgado accepted and told Guaneme "You always treat me well. I'll keep that in mind". Delgado drank a third vodka at around 8:15 p.m., handing Rosas payment and the promised poem. Afterwards, he sat down at the bar to have a fourth.

Delgado opened fire on the diners at approximately 9:15 p.m. According to witnesses, Delgado had taken out his gun and shouted that he was committing a robbery. With most inside having ducked to the floor, he approached individual people and demanded they hand over money. Instead, Delgado shot each person twice in the head at point-blank range as they bent down to reach for their wallets or pockets. In this manner, he shot 32 people, 19 of them fatally. Delgado promised not to kill any children, but he accidentally killed a six-year-old girl sitting at an adjacent table when his revolver misfired. Police arrived three to four minutes later, surrounding the building, breaking the glass windows and tearing away curtains to get a better view of the interior. Officers began exchanging gunfire with Delgado approximately ten minutes after their arrival. Several people escaped out the front entrance during this time, including the restaurant manager, who begged officers to stop their operation and stated that they had "already cost [him] a million pesos". Within a minute of the shootout, Delgado was apparently killed with a shot to the temple by a police officer.

There was the widespread belief that Delgado committed suicide, based on the testimony of 11-year-old Johana Cubillos Garzón, who said that she saw Delgado shoot himself as police breached the windows. After some time, police discovered with a comparison of the bullets that Delgado was shot by a police officer while he was reloading. It is alleged that because the assailant was only armed with a revolver, meanwhile some victims had been struck by Uzi shots, that some of the victims at the restaurant were actually slain by police crossfire.

== Victims ==
Two people were killed at the Calle 118 apartments. Seven people were killed at the Calle 51 apartments. At Pozzetto, thirteen people were dead at the scene. Fifteen injured people were brought to San José, San Ignacio, and San Pedro hospital and various military medical centers. Of the wounded, an additional six died in the hours after the shooting, while another died four days later. With the exception of an Italian national, all were Colombian citizens.

One of the first victims at Pozzetto was journalist Jairo Goméz Remolina, renowned for his true crime works and interactions with Colombian criminals such as Pedro López and Daniel Camargo Barbosa. Gómez Remolina had reportedly sat at a table closest to Delgado and most likely been unable to flee due to physical disability as well as partial blindness.

In the days following the massacre, the public list of casualties was repeatedly revised, as some fatalities had their names misspelled or expunged, their ages misstated, or were first listed as injuries and vice versa. Some victims were mistakenly counted twice, such as Claudia del Pilar Bermúdez, since she died at a hospital where victims of the Pozzetto shooting were treated. The murders of Nora Becerra and Claudia Rincón were only tentatively connected on 6 December 1986.

=== Calle 118 ===
- Nora Isabel Becerra de Rincón, 36
- Claudia Marcela Rincón, 14 or 15, daughter of Nora Becerra

=== Calle 51 ===
- Rita Elisa Morales de Delgado, 72, Delgado's mother
- Gloria Inés Gordi Galat
- Nelsy Patricia Cortés Viassus, 26
- Gloria Isabel Agudelo León, 50, professor
- Matilde Rocío González Rojas, 23
- Mercedes Gamboa Gonzáles, 20
- Claudia del Pilar Bermúdez Durán, 29

=== Pozzetto ===
==== Killed ====
- Carlos Alfredo Cabal Cabal, leader of the Nuevo Liberalismo in Valle
- Consuelo Pezantes Andrade, 23
- Antonio Maximiliano Pezantes Ricaurte, 57, father of Consuelo
- Hernando Ladino Benavides, 41
- Grace Guzmán Valenzuela, 20
- Giorgio Pindi Vanelli, 55
- Alvaro de Jésus Montes Ramírez, 20
- Jairo Enrique Gómez Remolina, 42, director of Revista Vea
- Rita Julia Valenzuela de Guzmán, 57
- Andrés Montaño Figueroa, physician
- Alvaro Pérez Buitrago, 38, Colombian Army major
- Sonia Adriana Alvarado Tamayo, 25
- Laureano Bautista Fajardo, 45

===== Died at hospitals =====
- Diana Graciela María Eugenía Cuevas Gallo, 45, executive of Revista Cromos
- Zulemita Glogower Lester, 31
- Helena Andrés Peña, 19
- Sandra Henao de López
- Guillermo Umaña Montoya
- Marly Cubillos Garzón, 6
- José Darío Martínez, 21

==== Injured ====
- Victor Mauricio Pérez Serrano, rural doctor
- Maribel Arce de Pérez
- Juliet Robledo
- Judith Glogower Lester, sister of Zulemita Glogower Lester and wife of Diego Betancur Álvarez, daughter-in-law of former president Belisario Betancur
- Myriam Ortiz de Parrado, 45
- Pedro José Sarmiento, physician
- Alfonso Cubillos, father of Marly Cubillos Garzón
- Yolanda Garzón de Cubillos, wife of Alfonso Cubillos
- John Paul Cubillos Garzón, 4, son of Alfonso and Yolanda
- Héctor Maldonado
- Johana Cubillos (not physically injured, diagnosed with "anxious neurosis")

== Perpetrator ==
Delgado's passport picture in 1976

Campo Elías Delgado Morales was born on 14 May 1934 to Campo Elías Delgado and Rita Elisa Morales, in Durania, as shown on his birth certificate and notary registry, though this is widely misreported as nearby Chinácota, his mother's hometown, due to his U.S. passport. The family lived in Durania, where Delgado's father was a business owner and part of the town's beautification committee, but they were forced to leave in late 1939, after a scandal in which the elder Delgado had unknowingly ordered the felling of a historic saman tree planted in honour of Durania's namesake, Justo Durán. They relocated to Chinácota to live with maternal family, before settling in Bucaramanga, where Delgado's father ran a well-known ice cream parlor. In 1941, his father suffered a nervous breakdown and died by suicide in the cemetery of Bucaramanga's Romero Park, shooting himself in the head in view of his son, reportedly under a saman tree. Delgado held his mother responsible for this incident his entire life, later claiming that she and his older sister both resented him.

Delgado graduated from Colegio de Santander in Bucaramanga in 1950, where he was regarded as a quiet, well-behaved student with excellent grades. He then attended San José Provincial School in Pamplona, but records indicate he dropped out in his graduation year of 1956, despite being listed on the honor roll. Delgado enlisted in the Colombian Navy and trained in a medical capacity. He later moved to Argentina, where he married and had two children.

According to the National Personnel Records Center, Delgado served with the United States Army from 12 August 1975, to 11 August 1978. Fellow soldier Art Fealey, claims to have met Delgado in the 5th Infantry, 3rd Battalion while in the Panama Canal Zone in 1975. He said Delgado was later stationed at the Army's medical center in El Paso, Texas, until 1978. During his service, He was honorably discharged as a Sergeant first class. While Delgado presented himself as a veteran of the Vietnam War, U.S. authorities could not confirm whether he was ever deployed in combat; the conflict had ended four months before Delgado entered service.

A refugee in the streets of New York City, he returned to Colombia after he was injured by a gunshot to the chest during an altercation with a mugger. Delgado then lived in Bogotá, teaching private English lessons and taking graduate studies at the Universidad Javeriana. His marriage failed, as did a second marriage.

=== Motive ===
Early theories, circulated by newspapers, focused on Delgado's alleged military service, suggesting that the massacre was a result of post-traumatic stress disorder. He and other mass murderers were called "Rambos" by the press, with Delgado commonly being compared to the American perpetrators of the San Ysidro McDonald's massacre and Dallas nightclub shooting in 1984, which the Colombian press inaccurately described as also being alleged Vietnam veterans. There was also a heavy focus on Delgado's familial background regarding his negative relationship with his mother and psychological trauma from witnessing his father's suicide.

According to himself, Delgado was no longer able to develop friendships in Colombia, for which he blamed his mother. As the years went by, he grew more and more resentful of her, calling her only "that lady" ("esa señora"). In the months leading up to the shooting, Delgado also got into several arguments with neighbours because they heard him beating his mother and locking her in a bathroom for hours. Conversely, neighbours of Rita Morales recalled that she treated her children, including Campo Elías, with a "caring, affectionate attitude", while her son behaved increasingly more aggressive following his return from the United States. Additionally, Nora Beccera and her daughter had once lived directly below the Delgados and maintained a good relationship with Rita Morales, due to which criminal psychologist Edwin Olaya suggested that Delgado killed the two because he "associated [Nora and Claudia] with his mother".

Olaya states that Delgado may have held some misogynistic traits, but that he was more likely influenced by an overall hatred for Colombian society and the disorganised state of the largely corrupt government, whether led by the Liberal or Conservative parties, and its failure to combat FARC guerrillas in the Colombian conflict.

== Aftermath ==
The Pozzetto massacre drew comparisons to the Diners Club killings in Cali, almost exactly two years earlier on 3 December 1984, in which three robbers killed nine people during a hostage situation at the Otero Building.

The newspaper El Tiempo was the first to publish information about Delgado that would later be proven false, including that he trained with the Green Berets and the U.S. Army Rangers, was honoured for valor by the South Vietnamese government, and that his position as a medic was a lie to cover up his true mission as a "super spy", based on frequent trips through the Americas and Europe made during his service.

Restaurante Pozzetto closed down for eight days to clean the blood left behind by the corpses and renovate the interior damaged by gunshots. The restaurant remained open at the same location until 2018, when the building was sold by the children of the original proprietor and was set to be demolished for the construction of apartments. The restaurant itself was bought by a former employee and as of early 2019, it still operated out of the old place, with plans to relocate within the city.

Several acts of copycat crime were attributed to the Pozzetto massacre, in what Colombians dubbed a social phenomenon known as "Pozzetto syndrome". A commonly cited example was Manuel "Mocho" Delgado Mahecha, a security guard who abandoned his workpost, set his discarded uniform on fire, and went on a shooting spree in Bogotá from late February to 3 March 1987, killing his former employer and injuring the man's daughter and two police officers with gunshots before being killed in a shootout. The claim that he was inspired by the Pozzetto massacre was challenged by Semana magazine, as it was later revealed that Manuel Delgado Mahecha was an escaped convict wanted for murder. By the late 1990s, the term "Pozzetto syndrome" had come to instead refer to the apparent passivity to acts of violence in Colombian society, based on the perception that most victims killed at Pozzetto remained seated under the impression that the gunfire would only strike other people.

Prolific serial killer Luis Garavito admired Delgado and other murderers, developing a desire to emulate him and go on a murder-suicide killing spree after murdering his family. He developed the idea after watching news of the Pozzetto Massacre on TV at a bar. He believed going on a murder-suicide killing spree like Delgado would be a good way to die.

== In popular culture ==
One of the first media depictions of the Pozzetto massacre was in a 1987 episode of the Colombian television series "Este es mi Caso", in which Campo Elías Delgado was portrayed by Edgardo Román.

In 2002, Colombian writer Mario Mendoza Zambrano published the novel Satanás, which presents the fictionalised accounts of the Pozzetto Massacre through the view of Delgado and the victims. The book was very successful and won the 16th Premio Biblioteca Breve award shortly after its release. Mendoza Zambrano met Delgado at the university in Bogotá when he was a literature student, lending him books later found by police in his apartment and keeping in contact with Delgado just several days before the massacre, later claiming that Delgado had actually sought him out on the day of the shooting. In 2007, Colombian producer Rodrigo Guerrero and director Andi Baíz adapted the book into a film, Satanás. In 2018, the events of the Pozzetto Massacre were illustrated in a graphic novel by Keco Olano.

Instinto Asesino ("Killer Instinct") covered the Pozzetto Massacre in a Season 2 episode titled "La Masacre de Pozzeto" ("The Pozzetto Massacre") in 2011.

A 2025 Netflix limited series, Estado de fuga 1986, presented a fictionalized version of the events.

== See also ==
- List of massacres in Colombia
