= Juan Ramón Plana Pujol =

Spanish writer

Juan Ramón Plana Pujol (born September 12, 1948 in Lérida, Spain) is a Spanish speaker and lecturer, teacher and writer focused on communication. He was general manager of the Spanish Advertising Association for 17 years. From this position he has always been calling and advocating for the role of advertising in society.

== Academic and professional experience ==
Pujol holds a bachelor's degree in business administration and management, law and tourism. He has had a long career as an executive in managerial positions for Madrid's city council, where he was the director of the Tourist board and Conventions Bureaux, Wagons Lits Travel, Telemadrid TV, and Paradores Hotels of Tourism. He led the Spanish Association of Advertisers in 1997, from where he impulse the Advertising Efficacy Awards in commercial communication. He has been president of the jury of the Aster Awards of communications (ESIC Business & Marketing School) where numerous recognitions to professionals, companies and media agencies were given every year. He has also been a teacher at various universities such as ESIC (part of the Polytechnic of Madrid University), University of Málaga, Alicante, Florida (EEUU) and the German University of Regensburg.

As a writer and speaker he pushed the theme of “personal branding” and “emotional marketing” in his book “Impacto al corazón” (Heart Impact), co-written with Elena Pérez del Monte. As an expert of management and motivation he published “El coleccionista de saludos” in 2016 (The Greetings Collector) co-written with Belén Boville. It is about his personal and professional experience communicating with famous people such as Dizzie Gillespie, Marcos de Quinto, José Saramago, Cabrera Infante, Ferrán Adriá, Luis García Berlanga.

As an actor he took part in the movies “Quiéreme”, 2007 (Love me) and “Los Amores Locos”, 2009 (Crazy Loves), both directed by Beda Docampo, and the internet TV series “El fútbol nos vuelve locos” (Football drives us crazy).

== Awards ==
- Agripina Award, 2016.
- Spain's Association of Advertising Editorial of periodical publishing, 2017.
