= Fan Ye (translator) =

Chinese translator

- 范晔
- Born: July, 1977
- Education: Peking University
- Occupations: Translator, Professor
- Writing career
- Language: Chinese, Spanish

Fan Ye (simplified Chinese: 范晔; traditional Chinese: 范曄; pinyin: Fàn Yè; born July 1977 ) is a Chinese translator.

== Biography ==
In 1995, Fan entered Peking University to study Spanish under Zhao Zhenjiang.

After the Chinese copyright to One Hundred Years of Solitude was officially authorized, he served as the translator of the book.

== Works ==
- Julio Cortázar (2009). Todos los fuegos el fuego [万火归一] (in Chinese (China)). People's Literature Publishing House. ISBN 9787020069323.
- Gabriel García Márquez (2011). Cien años de soledad [百年孤独] (in Chinese (China)). Thinkingdom Media Group Ltd. ISBN 9787544253994.
- Julio Cortázar (November 2012). Historias de cronopios y de famas [克罗诺皮奥与法玛的故事] (in Chinese (China)). Nanjing University Press. ISBN 9787305099090.
- Luis Cernuda (August 2015). A un poeta futuro por [致未来的诗人] (in Chinese (China)). Shanghai: East China Normal University Press. ISBN 9787567534575.
- Roberto Bolaño (August 2017). La Universidad Desconocida [未知大学] (in Chinese (China)). Shanghai: Shanghai People's Press. ISBN 9787208139411.
- Guillermo Cabrera Infante (July 2021). Tres tristes tigres [三只忧伤的老虎] (in Chinese (China)). Sichuan People's Press. ISBN 9787220123672.
