= Juan García Hortelano =

Spanish writer

Juan García Hortelano (14 February 1928 – 3 April 1992) was a Spanish writer. He was born in Madrid. His father was a doctor. When the Spanish Civil War broke out, he was sent with his siblings to Cuenca, only returning to Madrid in 1937 where he lived with his maternal grandparents. The libraries at school and home turned him into an avid reader. Following the war, he entered college in 1941, later studying law at Madrid University. He joined the Civil Service in 1953. Throughout his life, he dedicated himself to writing with fervour and discipline without abandoning his administrative job in Madrid. He cultivated friendships with writers and intellectuals of his generation: Juan Benet, Carlos Barral, Jaime Gil de Biedma, Juan Marsé and Ángel González.

He won the Premio Biblioteca Breve in 1959 for his novel Nuevas amistades, followed by the Prix Formentor for Tormenta de verano (translated into English by Ilsa Barea as Summer Storm.) His work belongs to the social realist movement pursued by some Spanish writers of the 1950s. His 1972 book El gran momento de Mary Tribune became his biggest commercial success. His work has been translated in a dozen languages and he also translated Boris Vian, Celine, and Robert Walser into Spanish.

He died in Madrid in April 1992.

== Works ==
=== Tales ===
- Gente de Madrid (Seix Barral, 1967)
- Apólogos y milesios (Lumen, 1975)
- Cuentos completos (Alianza editorial, 1979)
- Preparativos de boda (Almarabu, 1986)
- Mucho cuento (Mondadori, 1987)
- Los archivos secretos (Montena, 1988)

=== Poetry ===
- Echarse las pecas a la espalda (Hiperión, 1977)
- El grupo poético de los años 50. Una antología (Taurus, 1978)
- La incomprensión del comercio (Ediciones B, 1995)

=== Novels ===
- Nuevas amistades, Premio Biblioteca Breve (Seix Barral, 1959)
- Tormenta de verano, Premio Formentor de las Letras (Seix Barral, 1961)
- El gran momento de Mary Tribune (Barral Editores, 1972)
- Los vaqueros en el pozo (Alfaguara, 1979)
- Gramática parda, Premio de la Crítica (Argos-Vergara, 1982)
- Muñeca y macho (Mondadori, 1990)

=== Essays ===
- Crónicas correspondidas (Alfaguara, 1997)
- Invenciones urbanas (Cuatro, 2001)
- Crónicas, invenciones, paseatas (Lumen, 2008)
