= Eternal Curse on the Reader of These Pages =

1980 novel by Manuel Puig

- First edition (Spanish)
- Author: Manuel Puig
- Language: Spanish
- Genre: Novel
- Publisher: Seix Barral
- Publication date: 1980
- Publication place: Spain
- English publication date: 1982
- Media type: Print (hardcover & paperback)
- Pages: 232 (paperback edition)
- ISBN: 978-0-8166-3536-8 (paperback edition)
- OCLC: 41266355
- Preceded by: Pubis Angelical
- Followed by: Blood of Requited Love

Eternal Curse on the Reader of These Pages (Spanish: Maldición eterna a quien lea estas páginas) is a 1980 novel by Argentine novelist Manuel Puig. Originally written in English, it was first published in Spanish in the author's own translation. As in other works by Puig, the story is formally experimental, consisting of mostly unattributed dialogue, digressing into stories within stories. It also bears many of Puig's favorite motifs, including sexuality and leftist revolutionary politics.

== Plot introduction ==
The novel is set in Greenwich Village, near Washington Square. Larry, a poor and otherwise-unemployed former college student, accepts a part-time job taking care of 74-year-old Mr. Ramirez. Mr. Ramirez is an Argentine expatriate who has apparently lost his memory, as well as his understanding of basic concepts such as love and sexual arousal. Though the two men are ostensibly strangers, their conversations reveal that they may somehow have intimate knowledge of each other's pasts. Abruptly and without clear explanation, dialogue often digresses into elaborate melodramatic reenactments of events that may or may not have happened to the two men.
