= Tres tristes tigres =

Tres tristes tigres may refer to:

- Three Sad Tigers, a 1968 Chilean drama film, based on the play
- Tres tristes tigres (play), a play by Alejandro Sieveking, based on the novel
- Tres tristes tigres (novel), a novel by Guillermo Cabrera Infante
- Tres Tristes Tigres (album), an album by Los Yonic's
