= Satanás =

- Theatrical release poster
- Directed by: Andrés Baiz
- Screenplay by: Andrés Baiz
- Based on: Satanás by Mario Mendoza Zambrano
- Produced by: Rodrigo Guerrero
- Starring: Damián Alcázar; Blas Jaramillo; Marcela Mar
- Cinematography: Mauricio Vidal
- Edited by: Alberto de Toro
- Music by: Angelo Milli
- Production companies: A Proyecto Tucan; Rio Negro Producciones
- Release dates: 4 March 2007 (U.S.); 1 June 2007 (Colombia)
- Running time: 94 minutes
- Country: Colombia
- Language: Spanish

Satanás (Spanish for Satan) is a 2007 Colombian film written and directed by Andrés Baiz. Baiz's debut feature film, it is adapted from the novel of the same title by Mario Mendoza Zambrano which is based on the 1986 Pozzetto massacre. The film follows the lives of three characters, Eliseo, Paola, and Father Ernesto, living in the city of Bogotá, Colombia, in the mid 1980s.

The film was Colombia's submission to the 80th Academy Awards for the Academy Award for Best Foreign Language Film, but was not accepted as a nominee. It won the Best Actor and Best Film awards at the Festival International des Espoirs du Cinéma in Monaco.

== Plot ==
Eliseo, a middle-aged English teacher and veteran of the Vietnam War, has difficulties creating and maintaining relationships (especially with women). He lives with his aging mother, Blanca, but they detest each other and argue constantly. Eliseo is also irritated by his neighbor and landlord, Beatriz, who keeps asking him for money for her charitable works. He always coldly refuses, and is treated rudely at the local store as a result.

Eliseo works as a teacher of English, and one of his students is 15-year-old Natalia. He develops a crush on Natalia, who is gentle and polite during lessons. Invited to Natalia's birthday party, Eliseo is angry when he realizes that Natalia has a boyfriend, Esteban.

After a heated argument with his mother, Eliseo loses his temper, shoots her, and then sets the place on fire. On his way out he encounters Beatriz and he kills her too. Arriving at Natalia's house, he viciously attacks Natalia and her mother, killing them both. In the evening, he visits an old friend, a librarian who has always been kind to him. He tells her that he is leaving town and thanks her for her friendship. From there, he goes on the last leg of his killing spree, the high class restaurant, "Pozzetto". He chooses an expensive meal and a few drinks, and consumes them both. He pays the bill, leaving a big tip. He then goes into the bathroom and prepares himself for the upcoming massacre. When he comes out, he shoots a pianist playing “Piano Sonata No. 20 in A major, D. 959” before going around the restaurant shooting at customers and staff indiscriminately.

Paola is an attractive young woman who hates her job in the marketplace. She accepts an offer from an acquaintance to become a member of a gang of robbers. Her job is to act as bait to attract wealthy men in a bar, incapacitate them by putting Scopolamine in their drinks, and then lure them into a cab. Her accomplices then drive the victim to an ATM and steal his money. She is very good in this role, but is concerned about the welfare of her victims. She gets in a cab to go home one night after a successful operation, but the driver and an accomplice kidnap her and take her to an old taxi shop where they assault and rape her. She is deeply traumatized and eventually asks members of the gang to kill the two people that raped her. The rapists are successfully located and are murdered. Regretting their deaths and all the robberies committed before, she quits the gang and gets a job as a waitress at Pozzetto, an Italian restaurant. There she becomes one of Eliseo's victims.

Father Ernesto is a priest involved in a passionate love affair with his housekeeper. He is conscientious in his duties, but tormented by his sexual urges. Father Ernesto is trying to help a disturbed woman with three children who has come to his church seeking spiritual guidance. He goes to get food for them but when he returns they are gone. She returns some time later, alone and covered in blood, having murdered her children "to release them" from this life of evil. The scene anticipates the slaughter at the end of the movie. Father Ernesto visits the woman in prison where her demented diatribes predict future events. Traumatized by his encounters with the woman and unable to restrain his carnal desires, Ernesto loses his faith and refuses to go on as a priest. He resigns his position and takes his housekeeper for a date at a restaurant. There they are both killed by Eliseo.

== Cast ==
- Damián Alcázar as Eliseo
- Marcela Mar as Paola
- Blas Jaramillo as Father Ernesto
- Teresa Gutiérrez as Blanca, Eliseo's mother
- Vicky Hernández as Beatriz, Eliseo and Blanca's annoying neighbor
- Martina García as Natalia, Eliseo's English Student
- Patricia Castañeda as Valeria
- Carolina Gaitán as Natalia's friend
- Marcela Gallego as Natalia's mother
- Isabel Gaona as Irene

== Reception ==
Satanás was the second-most viewed domestic film, after Bluff, and the eleventh-most watched overall film of 2007 in Colombia.´Domestically, it grossed COP$3,510,608,128 (equivalent to in US$2,230,000 in 2011). The 2008 international release in Mexico, Peru, Bolivia, and Spain earned US$182,088.

Variety wrote "[Satanás] makes the mistake (the first of many) of tackling three stories rather than one", and that the ending "feels unclimactic since a more balanced rhythm was never established earlier", though praising the scenes between Alcázar and Gutiérrez.

== Awards and accolades ==
Award / Film Festival	Category
Festival of Monte Carlo	Award for Best Film Festival
Festival of Monte Carlo	Award for Best Actor (Damián Alcázar)
San Sebastián International Film Festival	Honorable Mention to Marcela Mar (Actress)
Festival de Cine de Bogotá	Best Film Award Colombiana
Festival de Cine de Bogotá	Critics Award for Best Film Colombiana
Festival de Cine de Bogotá	Bronze Award for Best Opera Prima
Festival International des Espoirs du Cinéma in Monaco	Best Actor (Damián Alcázar)
Festival International des Espoirs du Cinéma in Monaco	Best Film
Ibero-American Film Festival of Huelva	Pablo Neruda Prize for Best Feature – Awarded by the Student Film.
Latitude Zero Film Festival	Honorable Mention of Criticism and the Press

== See also ==
- Cinema of Colombia
- List of submissions to the 80th Academy Awards for Best Foreign Language Film
