= Fan Ye =

Fan Ye may refer to:

- Fan Ye (Han dynasty), Eastern Han dynasty official noted in the Book of the Later Han
- Fan Ye (historian) (398–446), Liu Song dynasty historian and politician, compiler of the Book of the Later Han
- Fan Ye (gymnast) (born 1986), Chinese gymnast
- Fan Ye (translator) (born 1977), Chinese translator
