= Milagros Frías =

Spanish journalist and literary critic

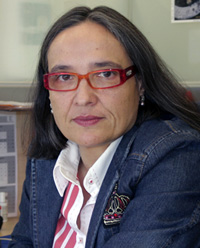
Milagros Frías

Milagros Frías (born 1955) is a Spanish writer, journalist and literary reviewer. She was born in Jerez de los Caballeros, Spain.

== Biography ==
Milagros Frias (born in Jerez de los Caballeros, Badajoz, in 1955) is a Spanish writer, journalist and literary reviewer. She is graduated in Information Sciences at Complutense University of Madrid, where she also studied Sociology. She has always focused her career on journalism and cultural issues. Moreover, she has been connected with publishing industry. She was editor of the magazine Nueva Empresa for a while and she contributed in the newspaper Ya and Gaceta de Pozuelo. Nowadays she works in the publishing sector as a literary reviewer in the magazine Leer.

Her most famous Spanish novels are La sal de la vida (Espasa Calpe, 1999), Ars Amandi (Espasa Calpe, 2000), Paisajes de invierno (Alianza Editorial, 2003), La alambrada de Levi (Language of Rag, 2006) and Amor en un campo de minas (Algaida, 2013), among others. She also published numerous tales in collective volumes and she wrote the long story L 'Ennui for the collection La Casa Ciega (Editorial Edaf, 2005).

She was awarded the Premio Torrente Ballester (which was celebrated in Madrid) in its XXI edition, thanks to her penultimate novel El verano de la nutria; an adventurous novel, full of nuances, which turns into a dramatic experience.

== Bibliography ==
- La sal de la vida (Espasa-Calpe, 1999).
- Ars Amandi (Espasa Calpe, 2000).
- Paisajes de invierno (Alianza Editorial, 2003).
- La alambrada de Levi (Lengua de Trapo, 2006).
  - Review in the magazine El Cultural by Santos Sanz Villanueva
  - Review in the newspaper ABC by Carmen Rodríguez Santos
  - Extract from Chapter I
- El verano de la nutria (Algaida, 2010) ISBN 978-84-9877-422-1 This novel received the Premio Torrente Ballester and it was regarded by:
  - Review in the magazine El Cultural by Pilar Castro
  - Review in the newspaper ABC by Carmen R. Santos
  - Extract from Chapter I
- Amor en un campo de minas (Algaida, 2013) ISBN 978-84-9877-961-5. It's about the main character, Sofía, and how she tries to find herself living different experiences.
- Luces que ciegan la noche (Suma, 2015) ISBN 9788483657614

With this novel Milagros was awarded with the Torrente Ballester prize, which is celebrated every year by the provincial council of A Coruña. She is the second woman who won this prize, which exists since twenty one years. The award is 25.000 euros to the best publication.

== Work in collective books ==
- Story L 'Ennui - Collection La Casa Ciega (Editorial Edaf, 2005).
- Sobre raíles (Imagine, 2004).
- Suiza y la migración (Imagine, 2005).
- Translatio literaria (Imagine, 2007).

== Awards ==
- Award Medalla de Honra del Reino de Merlín.
- Winner of the XXI edition of the Premio Torrente Ballester, organized by the provincial council, for her work Luces que ciegan la noche.
- Winner of the Narrative Prize Torrente Ballester in 2010, celebrated in Madrid, for her work El verano de la nutria.

== Quotes ==
"Los buenos libros quedan en la memoria"

"Sin azar, la vida sería una carta de ajuste"

These quotes are extracted from interviews that Delibros magazine made her in 2003, the author brings reflections from her work and her own personal experience.
