= Heartbreak Tango =

First edition (publ. Sudamericana)

Heartbreak Tango (original title Boquitas pintadas in Spanish: "Little Painted Mouths") is a novel by Argentine author Manuel Puig.

It is Puig's second novel published first in 1969, following the circulation of his first novel, Betrayed By Rita Hayworth (La Traición de Rita Hayworth).

== Synopsis ==
Characters in the novel include Big Fanny, Nélida Fernandez, and Juan Carlos Etchepare.

The novel opens with the passing of Juan Carlos Etchepare due to tuberculosis. Then the book picks up with the lonely Nélida, a former small-town Argentine beauty who earned the title of Miss Spring 1936 in a rural village in Buenos Aires Province.

By 1947, Nélida is married to a boring and impoverished auctioneer in Buenos Aires. But Nélida still dreams of Juan Carlos Etchepare, the handsome youth that had swept Nélida "off her feet".

The body of the narrative portrays the character of Juan Carlos via the confessions, newspaper clippings, diaries, letters, eyewitness accounts, and remembrances of his life. In a sort of hodgepodge array of these sources, Puig uses the story of Nélida and Juan Carlos as the archetypal contrast between mediocre reality and fantastical dreams, for example when Nélida dreams of her celestial wedding ceremony to Juan Carlos in heaven while taking the bus with her children, only to be disturbed by her son who says he needs to pee. The book touches upon questions of machismo and its damages to both the male and female characters.

== Publication ==
The English version of the novel was translated by Suzanne Jill Levine from its Spanish version Boquitas Pintadas and reissued by Dalkey Archive Press in 2010.

== Film adaptation ==
In 1974, Boquitas Pintadas was adapted into a movie of the same name.
