= El oficinista =

2010 novel by Guillermo Saccomanno

El oficinista (The Office Worker) is an Argentine novel by Guillermo Saccomanno. It was first published in 2010, and won the 2010 Biblioteca Breve Prize. The jury was composed of: José Manuel Caballero Bonald, Pere Gimferrer, Ricardo Menéndez Salmón, Rosa Montero and Elena Ramirez. Set in the future, it is about an office worker who falls in love with a secretary, and dreams of being different.
