= Tres tristes tigres (novel) =

1967 novel by Guillermo Cabrera Infante

- 1967 first edition dust jacket (Seix Barral, Barcelona)
- Author: Guillermo Cabrera Infante
- Working title: Vista de amanecer en el trópico
- Translator: Donald Gardner; Suzanne Jill Levine
- Language: Cuban Spanish
- Set in: Havana in 1958
- Publisher: Seix Barral
- Publication date: 1967
- Publication place: Spain
- English publication date: 1971
- Media type: Print (paperback)
- Pages: 451
- OCLC: 1210202
- LC Class: PQ7389.C233 T7

Tres tristes tigres (Spanish: Tres tristes tigres, lit. 'Three Sad Tigers'), abbreviated as TTT, is the debut novel by Cuban writer Guillermo Cabrera Infante. The novel was first published in Spain in 1967. It was later translated into English by Donald Gardner and Suzanne Jill Levine and published in 1971 as Three Trapped Tigers.

It is considered a classic of the Latin American Boom. It won the Prix du Meilleur Livre Étranger in 1970.

== Background ==
After Fidel Castro came to power in Cuba in 1959, writer Guillermo Cabrera Infante, who had supported the Cuban Revolution, became a cultural leader. He was appointed as director of Lunes de Revolución, a weekly literary supplement to the Cuban magazine Revolución. Cabrera Infante's relations with the Castro regime deteriorated and the literary supplement was shut down by the government in 1961. In 1962, he was sent to Belgium to serve as a cultural attaché to the Cuban embassy in Brussels.

It was in Brussels that Cabrera Infante wrote the first manuscript of what would become Tres tristes tigres. Cabrera Infante's manuscript novel, titled Vista de amanecer en el trópico, won the 1964 Premio Biblioteca Breve, a literary award given by the Spanish publisher Editorial Seix Barral to the best unpublished novel in the Spanish language. Mario Vargas Llosa was one of the jurors of the award at the time. In 1965, Cabrera Infante returned to Cuba upon learning that his mother was ill. However, he did not arrive in time before her death and instead attended her funeral. When he attempted to fly back to Belgium with his two daughters, he was detained by authorities for four months without explanation. He eventually left Cuba and went into exile, first in Spain, then in London. Tres tristes tigres was written before 1968, the year Cabrera Infante publicly disassociated himself from the Cuban regime with an interview by Tomás Eloy Martínez for the Argentine weekly Primera Plana.

After winning the Premio Biblioteca Breve, the novel underwent the process of censorship by the government of Francisco Franco. In 1965, Cabrera Infante was able to revise the galley proofs of the novel and decided to rewrite several passages. The novel was originally intended for publication in 1965 but, for this reason, the printing of Vista de amanecer en el trópico was delayed for a few years and ultimately retitled Tres tristes tigres.

In early 1967, the novel was finally published in Barcelona by Editorial Seix Barral with some resistance from Cabrera Infante due to the twenty-two instances of censorship carried out by Francoist censors. These deletions were not replaced in the successive editions in Spanish. However, the deleted passages were finally restored in 1990 when Cabrera Infante completely revised his book, restoring it for the collection of the Biblioteca Ayacucho in Venezuela.

The novel's title is taken from a classic Spanish-language tongue-twister.

== Summary ==
The novel is set in 1958 and centers on three young people within the nightlife of pre-revolutionary Havana. It is intentionally written in the Cuban Spanish vernacular. It has been described as a book in which language is the protagonist. It is a highly experimental, Joycean novel, playful and rich in literary allusions. Cabrera Infante intended to do for Cuban Spanish what Mark Twain had done for American English, recording the great variety of its colloquial variations.

== Reception ==
In his review for The New York Times, David Gallagher praised the English translation and its humor, calling it "one of the most inventive novels" to come out of Latin America. Salman Rushdie said that this is "the most exciting/sexiest/funniest/noisiest/most imaginative/most evocative novel".

== Translations ==
The novel has been translated into several languages, including into Japanese by Ryukichi Terao and Chinese by Fan Ye. The English translation was written by Donald Gardner and Suzanne Jill Levine in collaboration with Cabrera Infante and published in 1971 as Three Trapped Tigers.

The Turkish translation was by Seniha Akar, published in 1991 as Kapanda Üç Kaplan, and contained the longest anagram in literary Turkish language.

== Awards ==
The novel won the Prix du Meilleur Livre Étranger in 1970, for Albert Bensoussan's translation of the novel into French. Bensoussan's translation was published as Trois tristes tigres by Éditions Gallimard in 1970.

== Adaptations ==
In 1967, the novel was adapted into a play of the same name by Chilean playwright Alejandro Sieveking. In 1968, Sieveking's play was in turn adapted into the film of the same name by Chilean director Raúl Ruiz.
