= Nivaria Tejera =

Cuban poet and novelist (1929–2016)

- Born: 30 September 1929; Cuba
- Died: 6 January 2016 (aged 86); Paris, France
- Occupations: Poet, novelist

Nivaria Tejera (30 September 1929 – 6 January 2016) was a Cuban poet and novelist. She was awarded the Seix Barral Premio Biblioteca Breve in 1971 for her novel Sonámbulo del sol.

== Life ==
Nivaria Tejera, the daughter of a Cuban mother and a Spanish father from the Canary Islands, was born in Cuba in 1929. Before she was two, she moved with her parents to Tenerife, one of the Canary Islands, where her father was taken prisoner at the outbreak of the Spanish Civil War. He was not freed until 1944. After his release, the family returned to Cuba, where Tejera soon began to write and publish poetry.

In 1954 she went to Paris, where she continued to live for the rest of her life, except for brief periods. In 1959 she returned to Cuba to work for the Republic, and several years later she served for the Cuban government as a cultural attaché in Rome. In 1965, she broke her political ties to Cuba and returned to Paris, where she died in 2016 from pancreatic cancer, aged 86.

== Works ==
- Luz de lágrimas (poems)
- La gruta (poems)
- El barranco
- Fuir la spirale
- Sonámublo del sol
- Espero la noche para soñarte, Revolución / J’attends la nuit pour te rêver, Révolution
- The Ravine

== Awards ==
Tejera was awarded the Seix Barral Premio Biblioteca Breve in 1971 for her novel Sonámbulo del sol.
