= Joan Ferraté i Soler =

- Occupations: Poet translator

Joan Ferraté i Soler, born 1924 in Reus (Catalunya), died 2003 in Barcelona (Catalunya), was a Catalan poet, critic and translator.

He studied classical languages at the University of Barcelona, and lived abroad for a several years, teaching in Cuba and then in Canada at the University of Alberta in Edmonton. He served as the literary director of Seix Barral between 1970 and 1973. Ferrate has published widely across many genres: poetry, essays, biography, literary criticism. As a translator, he is best known for his translations of classical Greek poetry and of the complete poems of Cavafy. He won the 1979 Premio Crítica Serra d’Or for his volume of Cavafy translations, titled Vuitanta-vuit poemes.

== Family ==
He is the brother of the famed Catalan poet Gabriel Ferrater.

He has one daughter, Amalia Zeta.

== Honors ==
In January 2018 the University of Girona officially opened a reading room dedicated to Joan’s library and featuring some personal effects. These were donated to the University by his daughter Amalia Zeta.
