= Clara Usón =

Spanish writer (born c. 1961)

Clara Usón Vegas
- Born: 1961; Barcelona, Spain
- Occupation: writer

Clara Usón Vegas (born Barcelona, 1961) is a Spanish writer.

Her novel The Shy Assassin (El asesino tímido in Spanish) was awarded the 2018 Sor Juana Inés de la Cruz Prize, recognizing excellent literary works, written in Spanish by female authors. She is also the winner of the 1998 Premio Feminino Lumen de Novela for her novel Noches de San Juan and the 2009 Premio Biblioteca Breve for Corazón de Napalm.

== Works ==
- Noches de San Juan (1998)
- Primer vuelo (2001)
- El viaje de las palabras (2005)
- Perseguidoras (2007)
- Corazón de napalm (2009)
- La hija del Este (2013)
- Valor (2015)
- El asesino tímido (2018)
