= Juana Salabert =

Spanish writer

- Born: 1962 (age 63–64); Paris, France
- Writing career
- Notable work: Velódromo de Invierno

Juana Salabert (born 1962) is a Spanish writer, journalist, literary critic and translator. She is the winner of Premio Biblioteca Breve 2001 and the runner-up for Premio Nadal 1996.

== Early life and education ==
She was born in 1962, in Paris, where her parents lived in exile from Francoist dictatorship. Her father was the journalist Miguel Salabert. She completed a philology degree at the Université de Toulouse-Le Mirail.

== Career ==
Salabert writes in Spanish and her body of work includes novels, short stories, a travel book and a children's book. Her writings often deal with the history and the aftermath of World War II or the Spanish Civil War, or touch upon the history of displacement of her own family. She debuted in 1996 with Varadero, followed by Arde lo que será which was published the same year and was the runner-up for the Premio Nadal. Her 2001 novel Velódromo de invierno, which described the horrors of Nazism through the eyes of a child, was awarded with Premio Biblioteca Breve.

Salabert was the finalist for Rómulo Gallegos Prize (2011), Premio Dulce Chacón (2005), National Literature Prize for Narrative (2005) and Premio Dashiell Hammett (2008).

Apart from writing longer forms, Salabert has also written for the press, including texts of literary criticism, as well as worked as a literary translator.

== Works ==
- Varadero, 1996
- Arde lo que será, 1996
- Mar de los espejos, 1998
- Aire nada más, 1999
- Estación central, 1999
- La bruja marioneta, 2001 (children's book)
- Velódromo del invierno, 2001
- La noche ciega, 2004
- Hijas de la ira, 2005
- El bulevar del miedo, 2007
- Cuentos de amigas, 2009
- La faz de la tierra, 2011
- La regla del oro, 2015
- Atentado, 2022
