= Premio Torrente Ballester =

Spanish literary award

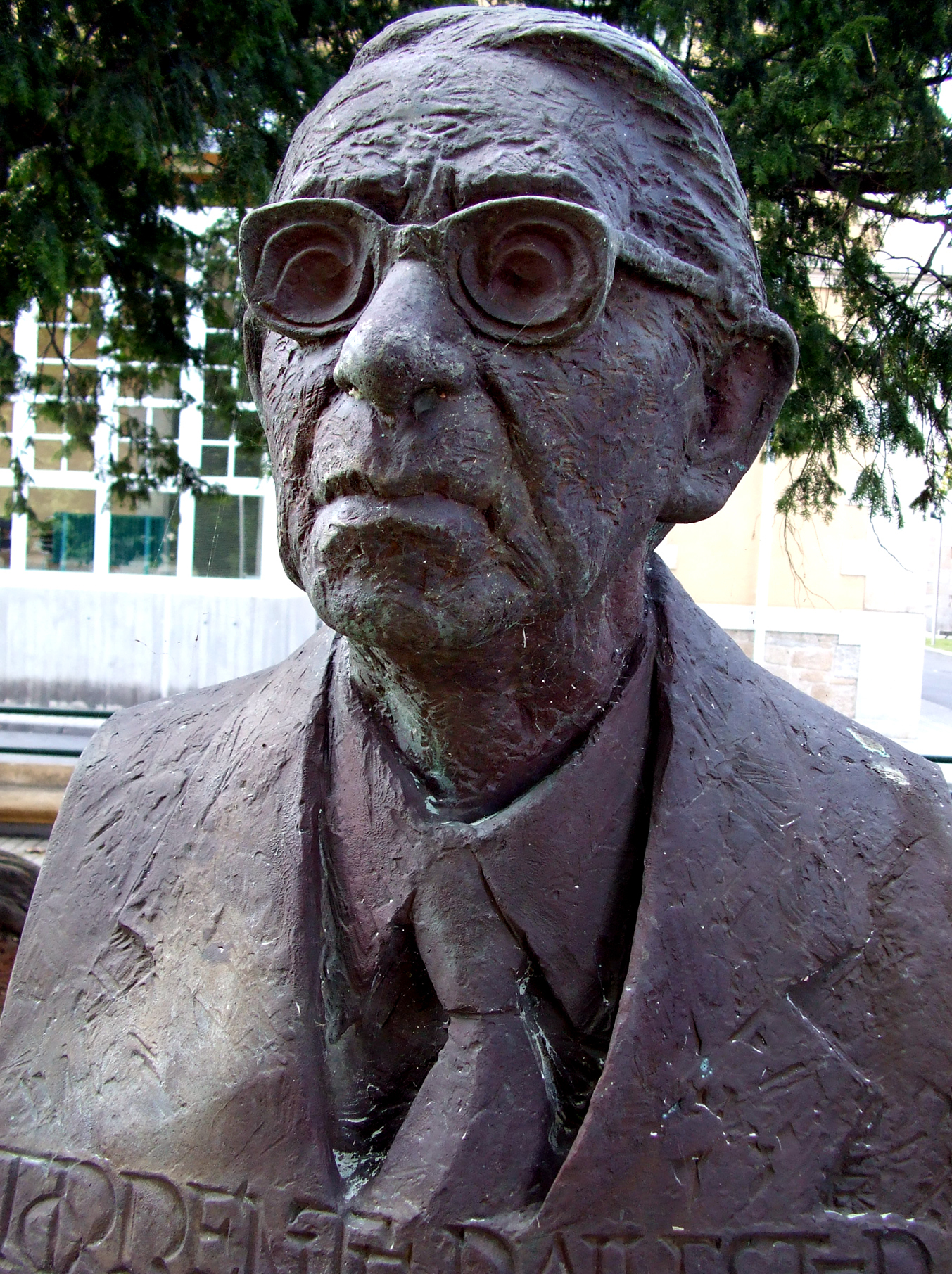
The prize is named after Gonzalo Torrente Ballester (sculpture in Ferrol, A Coruña).

The Premio Torrente Ballester is a Spanish literary award, given annually by the Provincial Council of A Coruña for an unpublished narrative work in Castilian or Galician. It was established in 1989 and is named after the writer Gonzalo Torrente Ballester. Since 2016, the award is split into separate categories for Castilian- and Galician-language works.

== List of laureates ==
=== 1989–2015 ===
- 1989. Pedro Crespo (in Castilian), La muerte en la boca
- 1990. Vlady Kociancich (in Castilian), Todos los caminos
- 1991. Ignacio Martínez de Pisón (in Castilian), Nuevo plano de la ciudad secreta
- 1992. Victor F. Freixanes (in Galician), A cidade dos Césares
- 1993. Antonio Pereira (in Castilian), Las ciudades de Poniente
- 1994. José María Parreño (in Castilian), Las guerras civiles
- 1995. Manuel Rivas (in Calician), ¿Qué me queres, amor?
- 1996. Xosé Carlos Caneiro (in Calician), Un xogo de apócrifos
- 1997. Fernando Palazuelos (in Castilian), La trastienda azul
- 1998. Francisco Javier Guzmán Fernández (in Castilian), La Brigada Lincoln.
- 1999. Carlos Martínez Montesinos (in Castilian), Una bandada de mujeres muertas
- 2000. Xosé Vázquez Pintor (in Calician), A memoria do boi
  - Finalist: Francisco López Serrano (in Castilian), Dios es Otra
- 2001. César Gavela (in Castilian), El obispo de Cuando
- 2002. Rubén Abella (in Castilian), La sombra del escapista
- 2003. Xesús Constela (in Calician), As humanas proporcións
- 2004. Luisa Castro (in Castilian), Una patada en el culo (published as Podría hacerte daño)
- 2005. Andrés Barba (in Castilian), Versiones de Teresa
- 2006. José María Merino (in Castilian), El lugar sin culpa
  - Finalist: Xabier López López (in Galician), Trinta e dous dentes
- 2007. Xosé Manuel Pacho Blanco (in Calician), A choiva do mundo
- 2008. Carlos G. Reigosa (in Calician), O xornalista. A vida do outro
- 2009. Milagros Frías (in Castilian), El verano de la nutria
- 2010. José María Guelbenzu (in Castilian), El hermano pequeño
- 2011. Esther Bendahan (in Castilian), Amor y ley. El tratado del alma gemela
- 2012. Ernesto Pérez Zúñiga (in Castilian), La fuga del maestro Tartini
- 2013. Jorge Eduardo Benavides (in Castilian), El enigma del convento
- 2014. Berta Vias Mahou (in Castilian), Yo soy El Otro
- 2015. Blanca Riestra (in Castilian), Greta en su laberinto

=== Since 2016 ===
Year	Castilian		Galician	
Year	Writer	Title	Writer	Title
2016	Vicente Luis Mora	Fred Cabeza de Vaca	Eli Ríos	Luns
2017	Ana Lena Rivera Muñiz (ex aequo)	Lo que Callan los Muertos	Manuel Antonio Piñeiro Fernández	A Través do Fume
2017	Fátima Martín Rodríguez (ex aequo)	El Ángulo de la Bruma	Manuel Antonio Piñeiro Fernández	A Través do Fume
2018	Dolores Torrano Vicente	La Argentina que dios quiere, viaje austro-atlántico	Xabier López López	900
2019	Miguel Sánchez Robles	El síndrome de Hybris.	Antón Riveiro Coello (ex aequo)	O paraíso dos inocentes
2019	Miguel Sánchez Robles	El síndrome de Hybris.	Alexandre Alonso Alonso (ex aequo)	Crónica denigrante
2020	Clara Escajedo Pastor	Lo que somos	Xosé Ricardo Losada	O rosario e a buguina
2021	Raúl M. Santos Ageitos	Cornucopia	María Cureses de la Vega	Ni luz ni llanto
2022	Not awarded		Amador Castro Moure	Pronto hei de volver
2023	Anna María Blasco Rovira (ex aequo)	El silencio de las palabras	César Lorenzo Gil	Sábeme a salamántiga o ceo da boca
2023	Jesús María Antón Ávila (ex aequo)	Viaje alrededor de las aristas de un cuchillo	César Lorenzo Gil	Sábeme a salamántiga o ceo da boca
