= Raquel Taranilla =

Spanish writer and academic

Raquel Taranilla is a Spanish writer and academic. She was born in Barcelona in 1981, and currently lives in Madrid where she teaches at Complutense University. Previously, she taught at the University of Barcelona and Hamad Bin Khalifa University. Taranilla won the Biblioteca Breve Award in 2020 for her debut novel Noche y océano. She is also the author of an autobiographical work Mi cuerpo también.
