= The End of It =

2026 science fiction film

- Directed by: Maria Martínez Bayona
- Screenplay by: Maria Martínez Bayona
- Produced by: Emilie Jouffroy; Kamille Kristiane Hodøl; Adrià Monés Murlans
- Starring: Rebecca Hall; Noomi Rapace; Gael Garcia Bernal; Beanie Feldstein
- Cinematography: Andres Arochi
- Edited by: Tania Reddin
- Music by: Paloma Peñarrubia
- Production companies: Elation Pictures; Fasten Films; BBC Film
- Release dates: 21 May 2026 (Cannes); 19 February 2027 (Spain)
- Running time: 102 minutes
- Countries: United Kingdom; Norway; Spain
- Language: English

The End of It is a 2026 science fiction film written and directed by Maria Martínez Bayona, in her feature debut. It stars Rebecca Hall, Noomi Rapace, Gael García Bernal and Beanie Feldstein.

The film had its world premiere at the Cannes Premiere section of the 2026 Cannes Film Festival on 21 May, where it was nominated for the Caméra d'Or.

== Premise ==
In the future when ageing has been solved, a woman approaching the age of 250 years-old decides she wants to die against the wishes of her husband and daughter.

== Cast ==
- Rebecca Hall as Claire
- Noomi Rapace as Martha
- Gael García Bernal as Diego
- Beanie Feldstein as Sarah
- Susan Wokoma
- David Verdaguer
- Pål Sverre Hagen
- Kristine Kujath Thorp

== Production ==
The film is the feature length directorial debut of Maria Martínez Bayona, who also wrote the script. It is produced by Emilie Jouffroy and Kamilla Kristiane Hodøl for Elation Pictures and Adrià Monés Murlans for Fasten Films and co-produced by Eye To Eye Pictures. Funding also came from the UK Global Screen Fund, and received backing from BBC Film. Cinematography is from Andres Arochi with editing by Tania Reddin.

The cast is led by Rebecca Hall, with Noomi Rapace, Gael GarcÍa Bernal and Beanie Feldstein, with Susan Wokoma, David Verdaguer, Pål Sverre Hagen, and Kristine Kujath Thorp.

Principal photography took place on location in the Canary Islands from April 2025.

== Release ==
The film is scheduled to be released theatrically in Spain by La Aventura on 19 February 2027.
