= Guillermo Saccomanno =

Argentinian writer (born 1948)

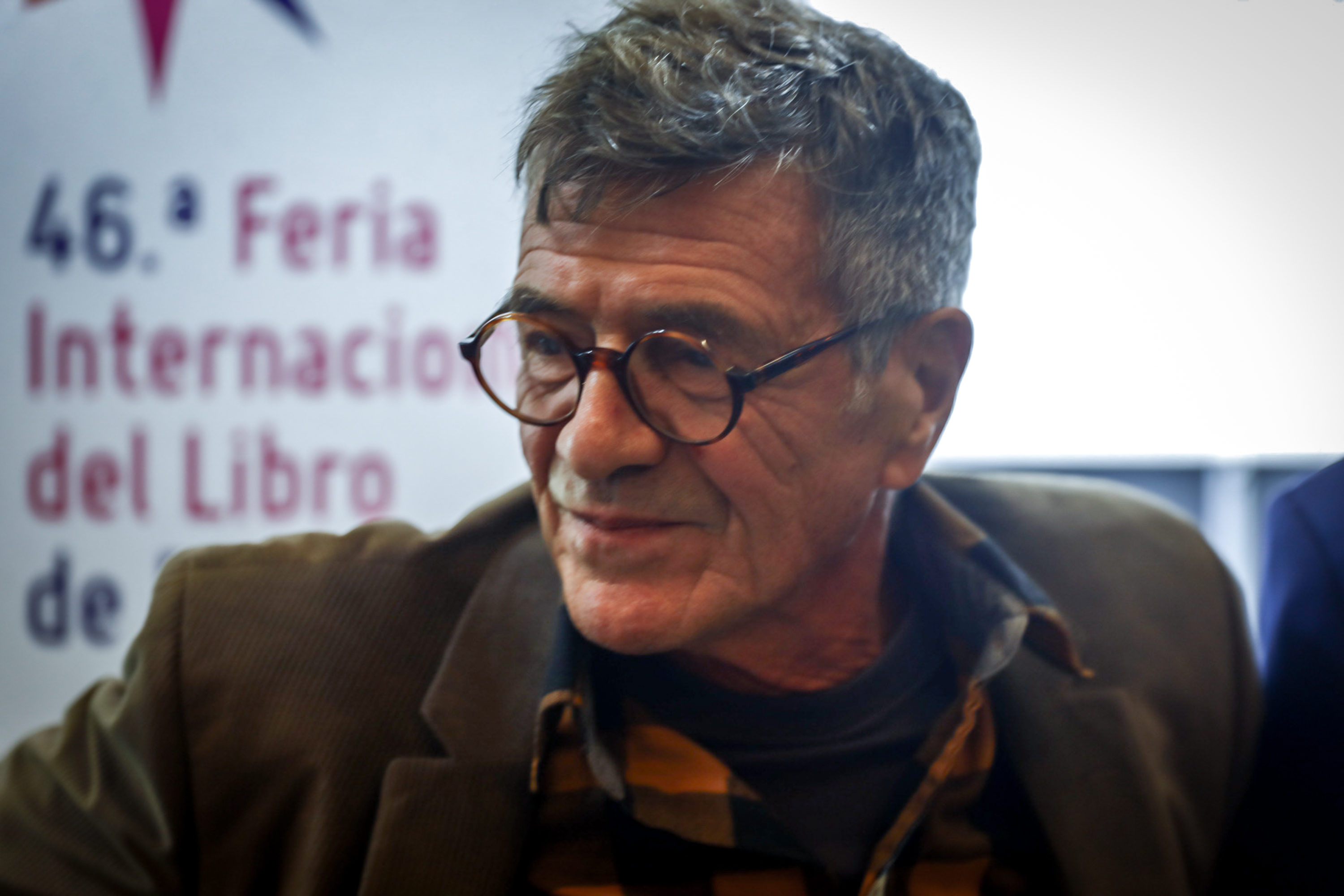
- Saccomanno in 2022
- Occupation: Writer, essayist, novelist, screenwriter

Guillermo Saccomanno (born 1948 in Mataderos, Buenos Aires) is an Argentinian writer, essayist and screenwriter. His most famous novels include El oficinista (2010) and Cámara Gesell (2012). He is a regular contributor to the newspaper Página/12, where he publishes short essays, book reviews and articles on poetry.

== Works ==
=== Film scripts ===
- Under Flag (Spanish: Bajo bandera) (1997), dir. Juan José Jusid
- 24 hours (Something is about to explode) (1997), dir. Luis Barone

== Awards ==
- National Literature Prize of Argentina (2000)
- Municipal Short Story Award
- Crisis Prize for Latin American Narrative
- Club of the XIII Award
- Premio Biblioteca Breve for The Office Worker (El oficinista) (2010)
- Hammett Prize (2009) from the Gijón Black Week for 77
- Hammett Prize (2013) from the Gijón Black Week for Cámara Gesell (Gesell Dome)
- Konex Platinum Award (2014) as the best novelist of the period 2008-2010
- Alfaguara Prize (2025), for The Wind Will Arrive
