= Esther Bendahan =

Moroccan-Spanish writer (born 1964)

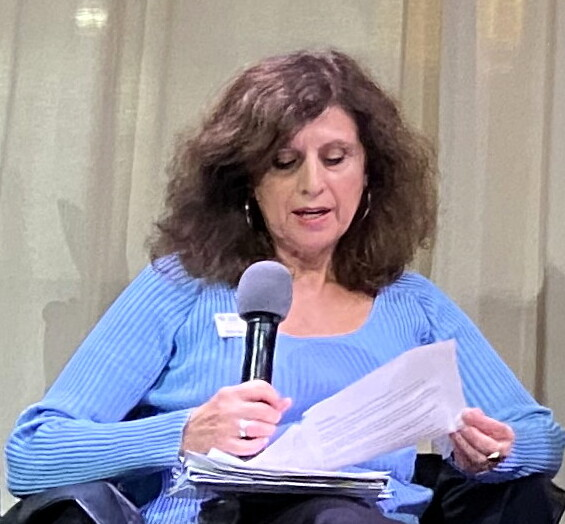
- Born: 1964 (age 61–62); Tétouan, Morocco
- Occupation: Writer

Esther Bendahan Cohen (born 1964 in Tétouan) is a Moroccan-Spanish writer.

Her Moroccan Jewish family moved to Madrid when she was a child, where she studied Psychology and French Literature. She is the director of the television program Shalom (RTVE) and the organizer of Centro Sefarad-Israel.

== Books ==
- Soñar con Hispania (Dreaming of Hispania) (with Ester Benari), Ediciones Tantín, 2002
- La sombra y el mar (Shadow and Sea), Morales del Coso, 2003
- Deshojando alcachofas (Putting the Leaves off Some Artichokes), Seix Barral, 2005
- Déjalo, ya volveremos (Let It Be, We'll Come Back Some Day), Seix Barral, 2006, where she tells her childhood and the disintegration of Moroccan Jewish communities.
- La cara de Marte (Mars' Face), Algaida, 2007.
- El secreto de la reina persa (Persian Queen's Secret), La Esfera de los Libros, 2009
- Tratado del alma gemela, Ediciones del Viento, 2012. Award: XXII Premio de Narrativa Gonzalo Torrente Ballester.

== Prizes ==
- Premio Fnac, Deshojando alcachofas.
- Tigre Juan Award, 2006 with La cara de Marte
- Premio Torrente Ballester, 2011, El tratado del alma gemela.

== Translations ==
- Au nom de l'Autre: Réflexions sur l'antisémitisme qui vient , Alain Finkielkraut, Seix Barral, 2005 (with Adolfo García Ortega).
