= José María Guelbenzu =

Spanish writer (1944–2025)

- Born: 14 April 1944; Madrid, Spain
- Died: 18 July 2025 (aged 81); Madrid, Spain
- Occupation(s): Writer, literary critic

José María Guelbenzu Fernández (Spanish: [xoˈse maˈɾia ɣelˈβenθu feɾˈnandeθ]; 14 April 1944 – 18 July 2025), also known as J.M. Guelbenzu, was a Spanish writer and literary critic. His work includes both experimental fiction (such as La mirada, La cabeza del durmiente, and Los poderosos lo quieren todo) and crime novels, particularly a long-running series featuring judge Mariana de Marco.

== Life and career ==
Guelbenzu studied at the Colegio Nuestra Señora del Recuerdo, run by the Society of Jesus, and later enrolled at the ICADE business school and the Law School at the Complutense University of Madrid, though he left university in 1964 to dedicate himself fully to literature.

His earliest publications appeared in literary magazines such as Signos, where he wrote film reviews, and Cuadernos Hispanoamericanos, where he published poetry. His first book was a poetry collection, but he focused mainly on novels throughout his career. In 1967, he was a finalist for the Premio Biblioteca Breve with his debut novel, El mercurio.

He worked for the magazine Cuadernos para el Diálogo, contributed to numerous literary journals and newspapers, and was co-director of the Cine-Club Imagen in Madrid. He served as editorial director at Taurus (1977–1988) and Alfaguara (1982–1988). After 1988, he devoted himself exclusively to writing.

Guelbenzu was a regular contributor to the Opinion and Culture sections of the newspaper El País, and a literary critic for its supplement Babelia.

In 2001, he published the first of his crime novels featuring judge Mariana de Marco, No acosen al asesino. He had expressed the desire to write ten books in the series.

Guelbenzu was married to Ana Rosa Semprún, a publisher and general director at Espasa Calpe. He died on 18 July 2025, at the age of 81.

== Works ==
=== Poetry ===
- Espectros, la casa antigua (1967)

=== Short fiction ===
- "Hogar eventual" (1967), in Cuadernos Hispanoamericanos
- "La donna de otoño" (1967), in Cuadernos Hispanoamericanos
- "La mosca de Funchal" (1992), in Una infancia de escritor (1997)
- "Recuerdo una vez en Argüelles" (1997), in Urogallo: Revista literaria y cultural

=== Novels ===
- El mercurio (1968)
- Antifaz (1970)
- El pasajero de ultramar (1976)
- La noche en casa (1977)
- El río de la luna (1981)
- El esperado (1984)
- La mirada (1987)
- La tierra prometida (1991)
- El sentimiento (1995)
- Un peso en el mundo (1999)
- La cabeza del durmiente (2003)
- Esta pared de hielo (2005)
- El amor verdadero (2010)
- Mentiras aceptadas (2013)
- Los poderosos lo quieren todo (2016)
- En la cama con el hombre inapropiado (2020)
- Mediodía en el tiempo (2023)
- Una gota de afecto (2025)

==== Mariana de Marco series ====
- No acosen al asesino (2001)
- La muerte viene de lejos (2004)
- El cadáver arrepentido (2007)
- Un asesinato piadoso (2008)
- El hermano pequeño (2011)
- Muerte en primera clase (2011)
- Nunca ayudes a una extraña (2014)
- El asesino desconsolado (2017)
- O calle para siempre (2019)
- Asesinato en el jardín Botánico (2022)

== Awards ==
- Finalist, Premio Biblioteca Breve (1967), for El mercurio
- Premio de la Crítica de narrativa castellana (1981), for El río de la luna
- Premio Plaza & Janés (1991), for La tierra prometida
- Reading Promotion Journalism Award (2007), from the Fundación Germán Sánchez Ruipérez, for the article "Hubo una vez una novela" published in Heraldo de Aragón (15 March 2007)
- Premio Torrente Ballester (2010), for El hermano pequeño
- Premio de la Crítica de Madrid (2016), for Los poderosos lo quieren todo
- Observatorio d’Achtall Prize, for lifetime achievement
