= Luisa Castro =

Spanish writer and journalist

Luisa Castro (born 1966, in Foz, Lugo) is a Spanish writer and journalist who has published in Galician and Spanish. She has lived in Barcelona, New York City, Madrid, Santiago de Compostela, Naples and Bordeaux. She is currently Director of the Instituto Cervantes in Dublin, Ireland.

Her first collection of poems, Odisea definitiva: Libro póstumo (Definitive Odyssey: :Posthumous Book) was published in 1984. Her next book, Baleas e baleas (1988), was her first work in the Galician language. Her first novel was El somier (Bed Base) (1999).

== Prizes ==
- 1986 Premio Hiperión with Los versos del eunuco.
- 2001 Premio Azorín with El secreto de la lejía.
- 2006 Premio Biblioteca Breve with La segunda mujer.

== Works ==
=== Poetry ===
- Odisea definitiva: Libro póstumo. Madrid: Arnao, 1984
- Los versos del eunuco. Madrid: Hiperión, 1986. (Premio Hiperión 1986)
- Baleas e baleas. Ferrol: Sociedad de Cultura Valle-Inclán, 1988
- Los seres vivos. 1988
- Los hábitos del artillero. Madrid: Visor Libros S.L., 1989. (Premio Rey Juan Carlos 1990)
- Ballenas. Madrid: Hiperión, 1992
- De mí haré una estatua ecuestre. Madrid: Hiperión, 1997
- Actores vestidos de calle. Madrid: Visor, 2018
- La fortaleza: Poesía reunida (1984-2005). Madrid: Visor, 2019
- Un amor antiguo. Vigo: Galaxia, 2022

=== Narrative ===
- El somier. Barcelona. Anagrama, 1990. (Finalista del VIII Premio Herralde 1990)
- La fiebre amarilla. Barcelona: Anagrama, 1994
- Mi madre en la ventana.' En: Madres e hijas. Freixas, Laura (ed.) . Barcelona: Anagrama, 1996
- El amor inútil. En Páginas amarillas. Madrid: Lengua de trapo, 1997, pp. 137–145
- No es un regalo. En Vidas de mujer. Monmany, Mercedes (ed.) . Madrid: Alianza, 1998, pp. 245–253.
- El secreto de la lejía. Barcelona: Planeta, 2001. Novela. Premio Azorín 2001
- Viajes con mi padre. Barcelona: Planeta, 2003
- Cuando más feliz soy. El Cultural, 26 jun 2003, p. 6
- Una patada en el culo y otros cuentos, 2004. Premio Torrente Ballester 2004
- La segunda mujer, 2006. Seix Barral. Premio Biblioteca Breve.

=== Essay ===
- Carmen Martín Gaite. In Retratos literarios Retratos literarios: Escritores españoles del siglo XX evocados por sus contemporáneos. Freixas, Laura (ed.) . Madrid: Espasa-Calpe, 1997, pp. 306–307
- Diario de los años apresurados. Madrid: Hiperión, 1998

== Bibliography ==
- Luisa Castro o la escritura doble. Rodríguez, Béatrice. In Mujeres novelistas: Jóvenes narradoras de los noventa. Redondo Goicoechea, Alicia (coord.) . Madrid: Narcea, 2003, pp. 97–107.
