= Benjamín G. Rosado =

Spanish journalist, writer, and critic (born 1985)

- Born: Benjamín García Rosado Bordallo; 1985 (age 40–41); Ávila, Spain
- Education: Complutense University of Madrid; Charles III University of Madrid; Wesleyan University
- Occupations: Cultural journalist; novelist; classical music critic; cultural manager
- Notable work: El vuelo del hombre (2025)
- Awards: Premio Biblioteca Breve (2025); Beca Leonardo, BBVA Foundation (2025)

Benjamín García Rosado Bordallo (born 1985), known professionally as Benjamín G. Rosado, is a Spanish cultural journalist, writer, classical music critic, and cultural manager. In 2025, he won the Premio Biblioteca Breve for his debut novel, El vuelo del hombre, and received a Beca Leonardo grant from the BBVA Foundation in the Music and Opera category.

== Education and academia ==
Born in Ávila in 1985, Rosado graduated with a degree in Audiovisual Communication from the Complutense University of Madrid and studied journalism at Charles III University of Madrid. He later pursued postgraduate studies in film studies at Wesleyan University in Connecticut, United States.

In higher education, he has worked as a lecturer in communication techniques at the Alfonso X El Sabio University.

== Career ==
=== Cultural journalism and criticism ===
Rosado has developed a career spanning more than fifteen years in journalism and cultural criticism, focusing on classical music, performing arts, and contemporary thought.

He was a staff writer in the music section of El Cultural from 2008 to 2013, and in 2021 joined the cultural supplement La Lectura published by the daily newspaper El Mundo. He serves as a regular classical music critic for the specialized magazine Scherzo, and has contributed articles and columns to general-interest newspapers and magazines including El País, Esquire, Vanity Fair, Harper's Bazaar, and Gentleman.

=== Cultural management and musical drama ===
As a music programmer and manager, he founded and directed the concert series The London Music N1ghts, held at Madrid's Café Comercial as an experimental platform for classical music listening formats. He has also authored musicological essays and program notes for institutions such as the Teatro Real in Madrid, the Gran Teatre del Liceu in Barcelona, and Carnegie Hall in New York City.

In 2025, he was awarded the Beca Leonardo fellowship by the BBVA Foundation in the Music and Opera category to develop MIEDO, a contemporary chamber opera based on the novella Fear by Stefan Zweig, featuring music by composer Mario Carro and a libretto by Rosado.

=== Literary work ===
In February 2025, he was awarded the Premio Biblioteca Breve by publishing house Seix Barral for his debut novel, El vuelo del hombre. The work is a psychological suspense novel set in New York City, following an author who, overwhelmed by unexpected literary fame, becomes involved in events that blur the boundaries between reality and fiction.

== Works ==
=== Novels ===
- El vuelo del hombre (Barcelona: Seix Barral, 2025). ISBN 978-84-322-4424-7.

=== Opera and stage works ===
- MIEDO. Libreto de ópera de cámara sobre un fenómeno cultural (2025, music by Mario Carro; adaptation of the novella by Stefan Zweig).

== Awards and honours ==
- Premio Biblioteca Breve (2025), for El vuelo del hombre.
- Beca Leonardo for Researchers and Cultural Creators (2025), awarded by the BBVA Foundation in Music and Opera.
