= Andrés Barba =

Spanish writer

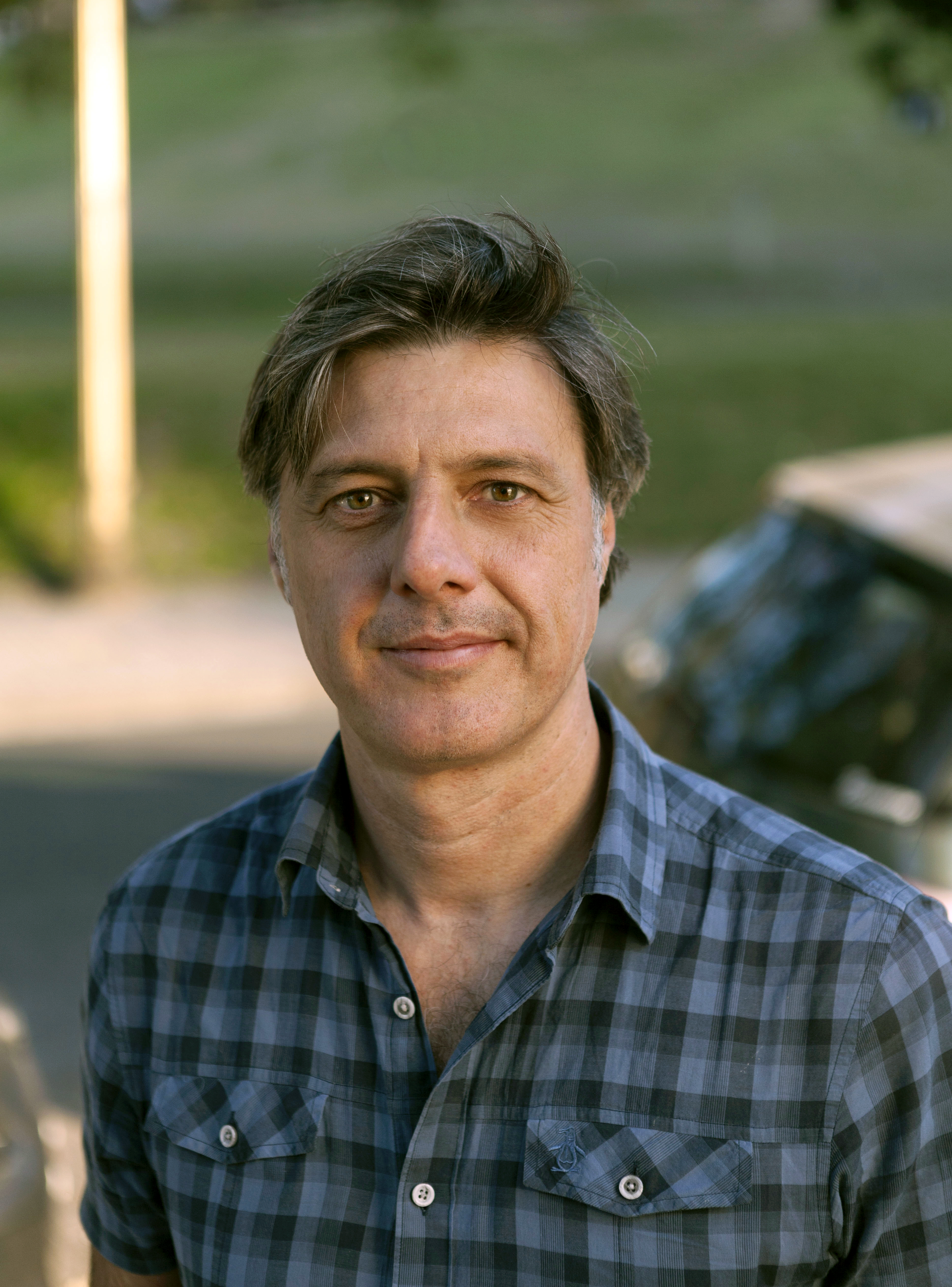
- Born: 1975 (age 50–51); Madrid
- Occupation: Writer
- Writing career
- Language: Spanish
- Notable work: A Luminous Republic
- Notable awards: Premio Herralde

Andrés Barba (Madrid, 1975) is a Spanish writer and translator. He graduated in Hispanic Philology from the Complutense University of Madrid, with a degree in Philosophy. He has taught at Bowdoin College, the Complutense University of Madrid and Princeton University.

In 2003 he was a resident at the Spanish Academy in Rome. In 2004 he stayed at the Residencia de Estudiantes in Madrid. In 2016 he was invited by the British Council and Queen Mary University of London for a fellowship and in 2018 he received the prestigious Cullman Center Fellowship from the New York Public Library.

As a translator he is responsible for more than thirty versions, mostly into Spanish, of authors such as Joseph Conrad, Henry James, Herman Melville, Thomas De Quincey, Lewis Carroll, Rebecca West, Allen Ginsberg, J.R. Ackerley, Scott Fitzgerald, Dylan Thomas, Edgar Lee Masters, among many others.

He is the co-founder, along with the painter Alberto Pina (with whom he lived at the Spanish Academy in Rome), of the publishing house of artists' books El cañón de Garibaldi. And he held an exhibition of all their work together at the New York Public Library in 2022.

He is married to writer and translator Carmen M. Caceres, with whom he has translated and written in collaboration and with whom he has a son and a daughter. He currently resides in Argentina.

== Prizes and awards ==
- Finalist of the Herralde Novel Prize (2001), for La hermana de Katia (Katia's Sister)
- Torrente Ballester Narrative Prize (2006) for Versiones de Teresa (Versions of Teresa).
- Anagrama Essay Prize (2007) for La ceremonia del porno, co-written with Javier Montes.
- In 2010 he was selected by Granta Magazine in England as one of the twenty-two most important young Spanish-speaking writers.
- Juan March Prize for Fiction (2011) for Muerte de un caballo (Death of a Horse).
- Nord Sud Prize. Fondazione Pescara Abruzzo (Italy, 2012). For Ha dejado de llover.
- White Raven Prize. Internationale Jugenbibliotheck (Munich, 2012). For Up with the sky, down with the ground.
- Finalist of the Jaime Gil de Biedma Poetry Prize (2016) for Crónica natural.
- Herralde Novel Prize (2017) Finalist Gregor Von Rezzori Prize (Italy, 2019), Prix Frontières-Léonora Miano (France, 2021) for República luminosa (A Luminous Republic, Une république lumineuse) .

== Film and photography related work ==
In 2008 the Dutch director Mijke de Jong made a film adaptation of his novel Katia's Sister, which won the Dutch Golden Calf award in two categories.

In February 2011 Andrés Barba held a photographic exhibition at New York University, Juan Carlos I Chair. This exhibition resulted in the book I remember . In the style of Joe Brainard's I remember or George Perec's I remember, the photographs and texts that make up this volume form a mosaic of the author's intense intimacy.

In 2020, in the United Kingdom, Maria Martínez Bayona made a film adaptation of Las manos pequeñas (Such Small Hands), which won Best Director at the Fantastic Fest (2021) and at the Aesthetica Short Film festival (2021).

== Translated into English ==
- Rain Over Madrid, translated by Lisa Dillman, Madrid: Hispabooks, 2014 [original title: Ha dejado de llover (2012)]
- August, October, translated by Lisa Dillman, Madrid: Hispabooks, 2015 [original title: Agosto, Octubre (2010)]
- Such Small Hands, translated by Lisa Dillman, Oakland: Transit Books, 2017 [original title: Las manos pequeñas (2008)] ISBN 9781945492006
- The Right Intention, translated by Lisa Dillman, Oakland: Transit Books, 2018 [original title: La recta intención (2002)] ISBN 9781945492068
- A Luminous Republic, translated by Lisa Dillman, Granta London, 2021.
- Last Day of a Prior Life, translated by Lisa Dillman, Scribe, 2026.
