= Maria Martínez Bayona =

Spanish filmmaker (born 1989)

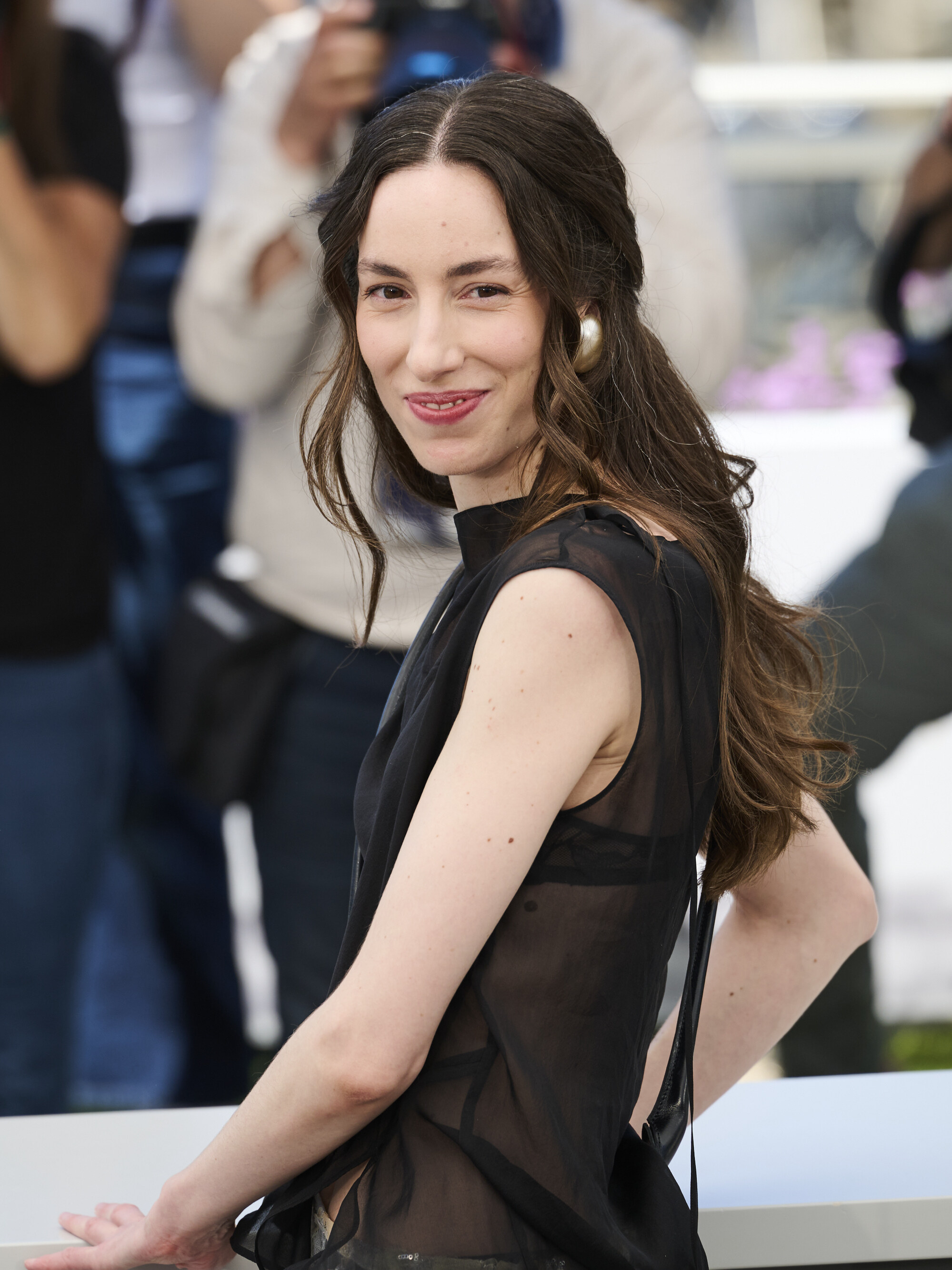
- Martínez Bayona at the 2026 Cannes Film Festival
- Born: 1989 (age 36–37); Reus, Spain
- Education: Pompeu Fabra University; National Film and Television School
- Occupations: Director; screenwriter
- Years active: 2016–present
- Website: mariambayona.com

Maria Martínez Bayona (Spanish pronunciation: [maˈɾia maɾˈtineθ baˈʝona]; born 1989) is a Spanish director and screenwriter.

== Biography ==
Martínez Bayona was born in Reus. She studied audiovisual communication at Pompeu Fabra University before receiving a scholarship from La Caixa to study at the National Film and Television School in London in 2014.

Her graduation short film, Mia, was long-listed for the British Independent Film Award for Best British Short Film in 2016. Her debut feature film, The End of It, premiered in the Cannes Premiere section of the 2026 Cannes Film Festival. Her second feature film, The First Witch, will be shot in Catalan, her native language.

== Filmography ==
Year	Title	Director	Writer	Notes	Ref.
2016	Mia	Yes	Yes	Short film	
2020	Such Small Hands	Yes	Yes	Short film; co-written with Andrés Barba	
2026	The End of It	Yes	Yes		
TBA	The First Witch	Yes	Yes		

== Awards and nominations ==
Award	Year	Category	Nominated work	Result	Ref.
Aesthetica Short Film Festival	2021	Best Thriller	Such Small Hands	Won	
Aesthetica Short Film Festival	2021	Best Director	Such Small Hands	Won	
Aesthetica Short Film Festival	2021	Best Cinematography	Such Small Hands	Won	
Fantastic Fest	2021	Short Fuse Award for Best Director	Such Small Hands	Won	
Strasbourg European Fantastic Film Festival	2021	Golden Octopus for Best International Short Film	Such Small Hands	Won	
Strasbourg European Fantastic Film Festival	2021	Audience Award for Best Short Film	Such Small Hands	Won	
