= Gonzalo Garcés =

Argentine editor and writer

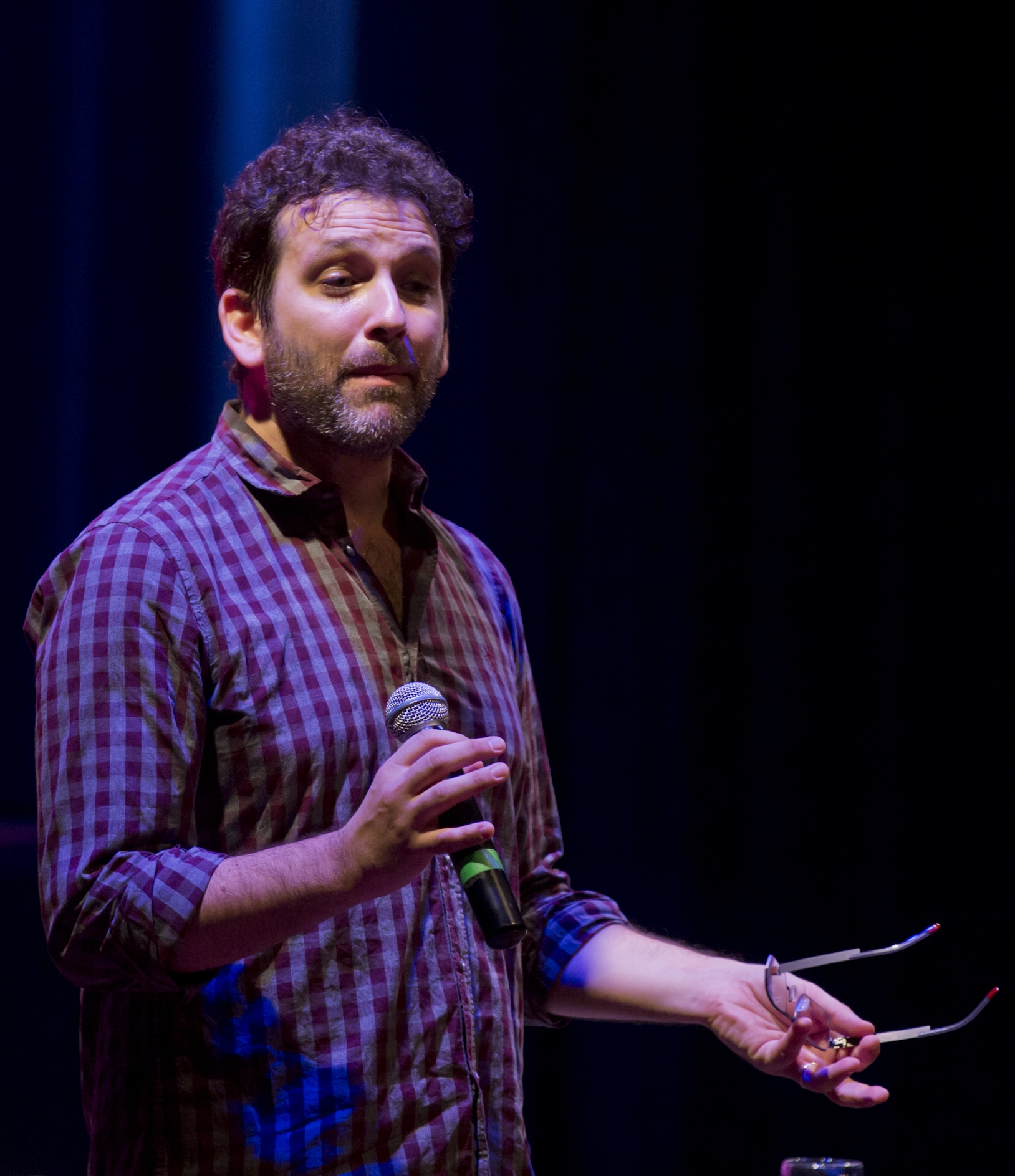
- Garcés in 2017
- Born: 16 August 1974 (age 52); Buenos Aires, Argentina
- Education: University of Buenos Aires; University of Paris
- Occupations: Writer, editor, critic
- Writing career
- Language: Spanish
- Period: Contemporary
- Subjects: Men's, fathers' issues
- Notable works: Los impacientes (2000); Hacete hombre (2014)
- Notable awards: Premio Biblioteca Breve (2000)

Gonzalo Garcés (born 16 August 1974) is an Argentine editor and writer known for his writing on masculinity, and for his criticisms of feminism. He also contributes to newspapers and magazines such as La Nación, Clarín, El Mercurio, Reforma, Brecha, Gatopardo, Perfil, El País and Quimera.

In 2000 he won the Premio Biblioteca Breve for his novel Los impacientes.

== Biography ==
Gonzalo Garcés was born on 16 August 1974 in Buenos Aires. He studied Philosophy at the University of Buenos Aires and Philology at University of Sorbonne.

== Works ==
=== Novels ===
- 1997 Diciembre. Buenos Aires: Sudamericana ISBN 978-950-0712-75-0
- 2000 Los impacientes. Buenos Aires: Seix Barral ISBN 978-843-2210-64-8. Biblioteca Breve Award
- 2003 El futuro. Buenos Aires: Grupo Planeta Editorial/Seix Barral ISBN 978-950-7313-54-7
- 2012 El miedo. Buenos Aires: Mondadori ISBN 978-987-6581-32-5
- 2014 Hacete hombre. Buenos Aires: Marea ISBN 978-987-1307-98-2
- 2016 Cómo ser malos. Ensayos sobre literatura. Buenos Aires: Letras del sur ISBN 978-987-4601-15-5
