= Satanás (novel) =

2002 novel by Mario Mendoza Zambrano

- Author: Mario Mendoza Zambrano
- Original title: Satanás
- Illustrator: Garry Wade
- Language: Spanish
- Genre: Novel
- Set in: Bogotá
- Publisher: Editorial Planeta
- Publication date: 2002
- Publication place: Colombia
- Pages: 285 pags.
- Awards: Premio Biblioteca Breve (2002)
- ISBN: 9789584202925
- OCLC: 49991813
- Preceded by: Relato de un asesino
- Followed by: Cobro de sangre

Satanás is a novel by the Colombian writer Mario Mendoza Zambrano published in 2002. The books centers around real life Pozzetto massacre that occurred in Bogotá on 4 December 1986 and presents four fictionalised accounts: those of the gunman, Campo Elías Delgado, and three fictional victims, María, Padre Ernesto, and Andrés.

It received the 2002 Premio Biblioteca Breve as best unpublished novel.

It was inspiration for the movie of the same name produced in 2007.
