= Betrayed by Rita Hayworth =

Novel by Manuel Puig

- First edition (publ. Jorge Alvárez)
- Author: Manuel Puig
- Original title: La traición de Rita Hayworth
- Publication date: 1968

Betrayed by Rita Hayworth (Spanish: La traición de Rita Hayworth) is a 1968 novel by the Argentine novelist Manuel Puig. It was Puig's first novel.

Literary critic Jean Franco writes that the book "was a revelation when it appeared, exploding once and for all the simplistic notions of American cultural imperialism." The book features what would become Puig's customary interests in mass culture, particularly Hollywood film. As Franco observes, "Set in a small provincial town in Buenos Aires province, the novel traces the intense affective relationship between Toto and his mother and friends, a relationship in which Hollywood films such as Blood and Sand and The Great Waltz provide somewhat bizarre models for an affective life which is not satisfied either by religion or the state."

With Puig's subsequent novel, Boquitas pintadas (Heartbreak Tango) of 1969, the book was a key text in the transition from Boom to post-Boom in Latin American fiction.

== Bibliography ==
- Betrayed by Rita Hayworth. Translated by Suzanne Jill Levine. Dalkey Archive Press. 2009. ISBN 978-1-56478-530-5.
