= Pubis Angelical =

1979 novel by Manuel Puig

Pubis angelical
- First edition
- Author: Manuel Puig
- Language: Spanish
- Genre: Novel
- Publisher: Seix Barral
- Publication date: 1979
- Publication place: Argentina

Pubis angelical is a 1979 novel by Argentine novelist Manuel Puig. It is perhaps Puig's work most influenced by pop culture. This can be seen in the montage imitating narrative technique, soap opera and science fiction elements. Also like other Puig works, it deals with psychological and sexual issues.

An English translation by Elena Brunet, using the same title, was published in 1986, and a film adaptation was released in 1981.

== Plot introduction ==
The narrative alternates between separate narratives. One is reality, an Argentine woman confined to a Mexican sanatorium in the 1970s. The others are a representation of her unconscious. In this second narrative, the woman is in Central Europe in the years leading up to World War II. She is here involved in various intrigues, and carries on an extramarital romance. The third narrative, another representation of the protagonist's unconscious, is a science fiction tale involving a cyborg woman named W218 in a post-apocalyptic Polar Age, who serves the government by performing sexual therapy on aging men, and is therefore in a sense a government-sponsored prostitute.
