= Ryukichi Terao =

Japanese Hispanist and translator (born 1971)

Ryukichi Terao (寺尾 隆吉; born 1971) is a Japanese Hispanist and translator.

== Work ==
Terao has published research work:

- Literaturas al margen (2003)
- La novelística de la violencia en América Latina (2005)

He is renowned for his translations into Japanese of several Latin American writers:

- Gabriel García Márquez
- Rómulo Gallegos
- Julio Cortázar
- Juan Carlos Onetti
- Alejo Carpentier
- Mario Vargas Llosa

Together with the Venezuelan translators Ednodio Quintero and Gregory Zambrano, he has also translated the work of many notable Japanese writers into Spanish:

- Kenzaburō Ōe
- Junichiro Tanizaki
- Kōbō Abe
