= Juan Benet =

Spanish, novelist, dramatist and essayist

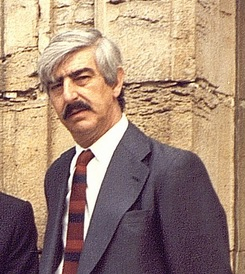
Juan Benet

Juan Benet (7 October 1927 – 5 January 1993) was a Spanish novelist, dramatist and essayist who also worked as a civil engineer.

== Early life ==
Benet was born in Madrid. At the start of the Spanish Civil War, his father was executed by a firing squad in Republican held Madrid, and together with his family he left for San Sebastián to find refuge with relatives. They stayed there until 1939, when they returned to the capital. In 1944, he completed his high school education and in 1948 he entered into the School of Civil Engineering in Madrid. He frequented the discussion group at Café Gijón, in Madrid, where he met the man who would become his best friend, Luis Martín Santos, among other authors of that time.

In 1953, still a student, he started an engineering internship in Finland and published his first play, Max, in which one can see the beginnings of a singular literary style that distances itself from the popular themes of Spanish literature of that era.

In 1954, Benet finished his engineering degree, and in the following year he married. After completing several works in Switzerland, he moved to Ponferrada in Léon, and after to Oviedo, for work-related reasons.

== Writing years ==
=== First stage ===
In 1961, Benet published Nunca llegarás a nada (You Will Never Amount to Anything), his first collection of stories.

In 1966, he returned to Madrid, and in 1967 he published Volverás a Región (Return to Región), at the same time that he designed the reservoir of Porma. There were already those calling his work "incorrect literature," and only a few contemporary authors, such as Pere Gimferrer, who believed that a great narrative writer had been born. In 1969, Benet was awarded the Premio Biblioteca Breve for his work, Una meditación (A meditation).

He wrote La inspiración y el estilo (Inspiration and style), an essay where he expounded his strong beliefs on art and literature, an art that is fundamentally about style more than about telling stories or making arguments.

His literary output increased between 1970 and 1973, as he published Una meditación, Un viaje de invierno (A Winter Journey), completing the trilogy that began with Volverás a Región, Puerta de tierra, Teatro, and Una tumba, La otra casa de Mazón and Sub rosa.

=== Second stage ===
In 1974, his wife, Nuria Jordana, died, causing a break in Benet's works and in his personal relationships. More introverted than ever, Benet didn't publish another work until 1976's Qué fue la guerra civil (What Was the Civil War). Until the 1980s he would travel extensively, including trips to China and to various conferences in the United States.

In 1980, he published one of his greatest works, Saúl ante Samuel (Saul Before Samuel), a complex work that received good critical notice. He was a finalist for the Planeta Prize in 1980 with his work El aire de un crimen, losing to Volaverunt by Antonio Larreta. Three years after, the first volume of Herrumbrosas lanzas (Rusty lances) was published. He continued this work with two more volumes published in 1985 and 1986.

While he was building his own engineering firm, he published the novel En la penumbra (In the Penumbra) in 1989. In 1990 and 1991, he published his final two works, the essay La construcción de la torre de Babel (The Construction of the Tower of Babel) and El caballero de Sajonia (The Knight of Saxony). He left the fourth volume of Herrumbrosas lanzas unfinished at his death on January 5, 1993.

== Legacy ==
In the 1980s, there began a very intense debate on his works that would continue after his death. The singular character of his works set his style apart from the narrativism of Spanish authors of the second half of the 20th century. The influence of William Faulkner is evident in all of his works.

Recognized today as one of the greatest Spanish writers of the 20th century, the Times on January 18, 1993, compared him with France's Marcel Proust, Ireland's James Joyce, and the U.S. writer Faulkner.

== Works ==
=== Novels ===
- Volverás a Región (1967). Return to Región, trans. Gregory Rabassa (Columbia University Press, 1985)
- Una meditación (1970). A Meditation, trans. Gregory Rabassa (Persea Books, 1982)
- Un viaje de invierno (1972)
- La otra casa de Mazón (1973)
- En el Estado (1977)
- Saúl ante Samuel (1980)
- El aire de un crimen (1980)
- Herrumbrosas lanzas I-VI (1983)
- Herrumbrosas lanzas VII (1985)
- Herrumbrosas lanzas VIII-XII (1986)
- En la penumbra (1989)
- El caballero de Sajonia (1991)

=== Short story collections ===
- Nunca llegarás a nada (1961)
- Una tumba (1971)
- 5 Narraciones y 2 fábulas (1972)
- Sub rosa (1973)
- Trece fábulas y media (1981)

=== Essays ===
- La inspiración y el estilo (1966)
- Puerta de tierra (1970)
- El ángel del Señor abandona a Tobías (1976)
- Qué fue la guerra civil (1976)
- En ciernes (1976)
- Del pozo y del Numa (1978)
- La moviola de Eurípides (1981)
- Sobre la incertidumbre (1982)
- El agua en España (1986)
- Otoño en Madrid hacia 1950 (1987)
- Londres victoriano (1989)
- La construcción de la torre de Babel (1990). The Construction of the Tower of Babel, trans. Adrian Nathan West (Wakefield Press, 2017)

== Relevant literature ==
- Goldberg, Harriet. "Riddles and enigmas in medieval castilian literature." Romance Philology 36, no. 2 (1982): 209-221.
- Ocha, Laura Yadira Munguía. 2017. "Salas Barbadillo y sus epigramas en relación con los enigmas de Sor Juana Salas Barbadillo and his epigrams in relation to the enigmas of Sor Juana. Sincronia: Revisita de Filosofia y Letras XI.71.
