= Zhao Zhenjiang =

Chinese translator (born 1940)

- 赵振江
- Born: February 1940 (age 86); Shunyi County, Beijing, China
- Education: Peking University
- Occupation: Translator
- Writing career
- Language: Chinese, Spanish
- Period: 1963-present
- Genres: Novel, poem

Zhao Zhenjiang (simplified Chinese: 赵振江; traditional Chinese: 趙振江; pinyin: Zhào Zhènjiāng; born February 1940) is a Chinese translator. For his contributions to the introduction of Spanish literature to foreign readers, he was honored with Queen Isabel Medal by the Spanish government in 1998, Order of May by Argentina in 1999, and Neruda Centennial Medal by Chile in 2004.

== Biography ==
Zhao was born in Shunyi County, Beijing, in February 1940. He secondary studied at Niulanshan High School (牛栏山中学). In 1959, he was accepted to Peking University, majoring in French, one year later, he was transferred to the newly founded Spanish Department alongside Zhao Deming and Duan Ruochuan. After graduating in 1963, he taught at the university.

== Personal life ==
Zhao married Duan Ruochuan, who is also a Spanish literature translator.

== Works ==
- Zhao Zhenjiang (2000). 西班牙与西班牙语美洲诗歌导论 [Introduction to Spanish and Spanish American Poetry] (in Chinese). Beijing: Peking University Press. ISBN 9787301059142.
- Zhao Zhenjiang; Teng Wei; Hu Xudong (2007). 拉丁美洲文学大花园 [Latin American Literature Garden] (in Chinese). Wuhan, Hubei: Hubei Education Press. ISBN 9787535147301.
- Zhao Zhenjiang; Fan Ye; Cheng Yiyang (2017). 西班牙20世纪诗歌研究 [A Study of Spanish Poetry in the 20th Century] (in Chinese). Beijing: Peking University Press. ISBN 9787301279977.
- Zhao Zhenjiang; Teng Wei (2004). 山岩上的肖像：聂鲁达的爱情·诗·革命 [Portrait on the Rocks: Neruda's Love, Poetry and Revolution] (in Chinese). Beijing: People's Literature Publishing House. ISBN 9787208052925.

== Translations ==
- Octavio Paz (2014). Piedra de sol 太阳石 (in Chinese). Beijing: Beijing Yanshan Publishing House. ISBN 9787540236274.
- Octavio Paz (2014). El arco y la lira 弓与琴 (in Chinese). Beijing: Beijing Yanshan Publishing House. ISBN 9787540236311.
- Octavio Paz (2015). Pasion critica 批评的激情 (in Chinese). Beijing: Beijing Yanshan Publishing House. ISBN 9787540220617.
- Octavio Paz (2014). El laberinto de la soledad 孤独的迷宫 (in Chinese). Beijing: Beijing Yanshan Publishing House. ISBN 9787540236304.
- Antologia de la Poesia Mexicana 墨西哥诗选 (in Chinese). Translated by Zhao Zhenjiang; Duan Jicheng. Beijing: People's Literature Publishing House. 2000. ISBN 9787020094417.
- Antonio Machado (2018). 卡斯蒂利亚的田野:马查多诗选 [Selected Poems of Antonio Machado] (in Chinese). Beijing: Foreign Language Teaching and Research Press. ISBN 9787513597173.
- Gonzalo Rojas (2017). El sol la unica semilla 太阳是唯一的种子 (in Chinese). Shanghai: Commercial Press. ISBN 9787100139458.
- Jose Hernandez (2018). Martin Fierro 马丁·菲耶罗 (in Chinese). Beijing: Yilin Press. ISBN 9787544773768.
- 浪的旋律 (in Chinese). Beijing: China Braille Press. 2019. ISBN 9787500288671.
- Vargas Llosa (2014). La guerra del fin del mundo 世界末日之战 (in Chinese). Translated by Zhao Zhenjiang; Zhao Deming; Duan Yuran. Shanghai: Shanghai Literature and Art Publishing House. ISBN 9787532154982.

== Honours and awards ==
- 1995 Order of Reuven Dario
- 1998 Queen Isabel Medal for translating Dream of Red Mansion
- 1999 Order of May for translating Martin Fierro
- 2004 Neruda Centennial Medal
