= Manuel Puig =

Argentine writer (1932–1990)

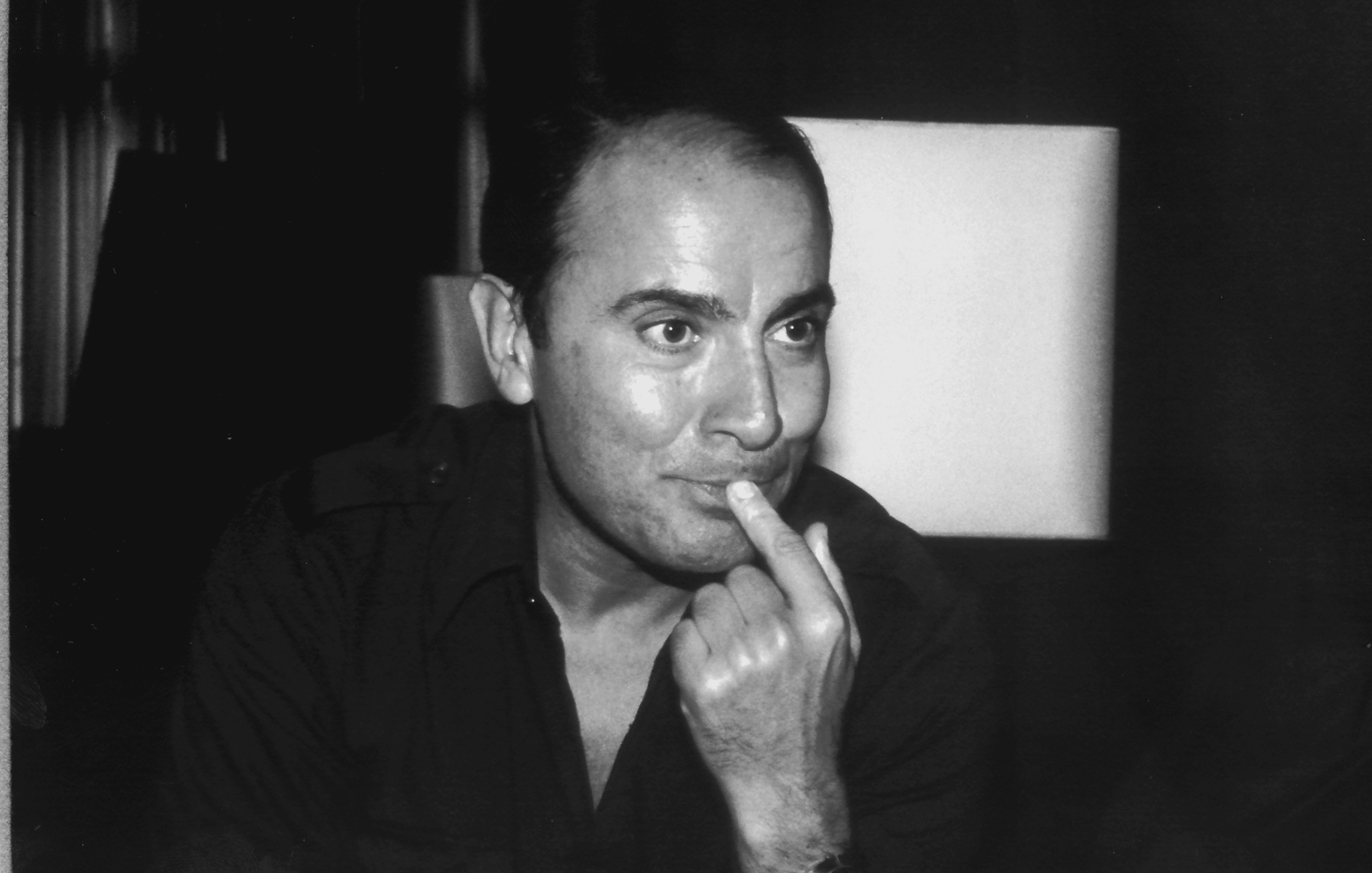
- 1979
- Born: December 28, 1932; General Villegas, Argentina
- Died: July 22, 1990 (aged 57); Cuernavaca, Mexico
- Occupations: Novelist, screenwriter
- Writing career
- Period: 1968-1990
- Literary movement: Postboom, Post-modernist

Juan Manuel Puig Delledonne (December 28, 1932 – July 22, 1990), commonly called Manuel Puig, was an Argentine author and LGBTQ activist. Among his best-known novels are La traición de Rita Hayworth (Betrayed by Rita Hayworth, 1968), Boquitas pintadas (Heartbreak Tango, 1969), and El beso de la mujer araña (Kiss of the Spider Woman, 1976) which was adapted into the film released in 1985, directed by the Argentine-Brazilian director Héctor Babenco; and a Broadway musical in 1993.

== Early life, education and early career ==
Puig was born in General Villegas, Buenos Aires Province. Since there was no high school in General Villegas, his parents sent him to Buenos Aires in 1946. Puig attended Colegio Ward in Villa Sarmiento (Morón County). This is when he began to read systematically, beginning with a collection of texts by Nobel Prize winners. A classmate named Horacio, in whose home Puig rented accommodation when he first moved to Buenos Aires City introduced him to readings from the school of psychoanalysis. The first novel that he read was The Pastoral Symphony by André Gide; he also read Hermann Hesse, Aldous Huxley, Jean-Paul Sartre, and Thomas Mann.

Horacio also introduced Puig to European cinema. After seeing Quai des Orfèvres (1947), he decided that he wanted to be a film director. To prepare for his chosen career, he learned Italian, French, and German, which were considered "the new languages of cinema". He was advised to study engineering in order to specialize in sound-on-film but did not consider this to be the right choice. In 1950, he enrolled in the University of Buenos Aires Faculty of Architecture but only took classes for six months. In 1951, Puig switched to the School of Philosophy. He was a diligent student, although he struggled with subjects such as Latin. When he graduated, he was already working in film as an archivist and editor in Buenos Aires and later, in Italy after winning a scholarship from the Italian Institute of Buenos Aires. However, the world of Hollywood and the stars that had captivated him during his childhood now disappointed him; the exceptions were Marilyn Monroe and Gloria Swanson.

A note in the magazine Radiolandia about the upcoming premiere of the film Deshonra prompted Puig to try and meet its director Daniel Tinayre, whose comedy La vendedora de fantasías he admired. Since the director denied him access to the set, he spoke to the actress Fanny Navarro, who played the main role, without Tinayre's permission. He felt no sympathy for her since she supported Juan Domingo Perón, who had prohibited the importation of American films into Argentina. Navarro sent him to another actress of the cast, Herminia Franco, who got him in. Shortly after, he began to work in Alex laboratories.

In 1953, Puig did his obligatory military service in the area of Aeronautics, working as a translator.

== Writing career ==
In the 1960s, Manuel Puig moved back to Buenos Aires, where he penned his first major novel, La traición de Rita Hayworth. Because he had leftist political tendencies and also foresaw a rightist wave in Argentina, Puig moved to Mexico in 1973, where he wrote his later works (including El beso de la mujer araña).

Much of Puig's work can be seen as pop art. Perhaps due to his work in film and television, Puig managed to create a writing style that incorporated elements of these mediums, such as montage and the use of multiple points of view. He also made much use of popular culture (for example, soap opera) in his works. In Latin American literary histories, he is presented as a writer who belongs to the Postboom and Post-modernist schools.

== Death ==
Puig lived in exile throughout most of his life. In 1989, Puig moved from Mexico City to Cuernavaca, Mexico, where he died in 1990. In the previous months, he had stopped smoking on his doctor's orders and took daily walks but did not feel well at the altitude of Mexico. He also made sure to receive his care in a clinic near his house so he would not be far away from his mother, but for economic reasons and availability of contacts, he had access to higher quality medical attention. In the official biography, Manuel Puig and the Spider Woman: His Life and Fiction, his close friend Suzanne Jill Levine writes that Puig had been in pain for a few days prior to being admitted to a hospital, where he was told what needed to be done.

On Saturday July 21, 1990, he was checked into Las Palmas Surgical Center for risk of peritonitis. An emergency procedure was performed on his inflamed gallbladder, which was removed. While Puig was recovering after the surgery, he began to have respiratory problems; his lungs had filled with fluid, and he was becoming delirious. The medical team was unable to help Puig and they had to secure him to the bed. He died from acute myocardial infarction (heart attack) at 4:55 a.m. on July 22, 1990.

His death leaked quickly through the media. Although he had a background of cardiac problems, the first public assumption was that he had died from AIDS. It was soon ascertained that Manuel Puig did not have HIV. Nevertheless, the public had already contested that fact several times.

Only six people attended his funeral service, including his mother, his friends Javier Labrada and Agustín Garcia Gil, and his colleague Tununa Mercado who happened to be on her way to Xalapa city in Veracruz.

When Jorge Abelardo Ramos, the Argentine ambassador of Mexico was asked to speak to the media about the death of Manuel Puig, he responded by saying that he was not aware of the death of an Argentine with that name. Regardless, they had his body sent to the Federal District of Mexico for his funeral rites with the Writer's Society, and the ambassador arrived and gave a speech.

Manuel Puig's bodily remains were sent to Argentina a few days later and were placed in the Puig family tomb in the cemetery of La Plata.

The 2004 film Vereda Tropical (film), directed by Javier Torres, depicts the period during which Puig lived in Rio de Janeiro, Brazil. The writer's role is played by the actor Fabio Aste.

== Work ==
Critics such as Pamela Bacarisse divide Puig's work into two groups: his early novels, which "attracted an enormous audience by weaving into his narratives the artistic 'sub-products' of mass culture"; and his later books, which have "lost their popular appeal" as they evidence "a depressing, even unpalatable, vision of life, no longer even superficially sweetened by palliatives as the mass-media elements are left behind".

Three translations of his work have been reprinted by Dalkey Archive Press:

- 2009: Betrayed by Rita Hayworth
- 2010: The Buenos Aires Affair
- 2010: Heartbreak Tango

== List of works ==
=== Novels ===
- 1968: La traición de Rita Hayworth
  - Betrayed by Rita Hayworth, Translator Suzanne Jill Levine, Dalkey Archive Press, 2009, ISBN 978-1-56478-530-5
- 1969: Boquitas pintadas; Seix Barral, 2004, ISBN 978-950-731-430-8
  - Heartbreak Tango
- 1973: The Buenos Aires Affair (The Buenos Aires Affair)
- 1976: El beso de la mujer araña; José Amícola, Jorge Panesi, Editors, Fondo De Cultura Economica, 2002, ISBN 978-84-89666-45-0
  - Kiss of the Spider Woman, reprint Random House, Inc., 1991, ISBN 978-0-679-72449-0
- 1979: Pubis angelical (Pubis Angelical) Seix Barral, 1979, ISBN 978-84-322-1379-3
- 1980: Maldición eterna a quien lea estas páginas (Eternal Curse on the Reader of These Pages)
- 1982: Sangre de amor correspondido (Blood of Requited Love)
- 1988: Cae la noche tropical (Tropical Night Falling)

=== Plays and screenplays ===
- 1983: Bajo un manto de estrellas. Beatriz Viterbo Editora. 1997. ISBN 978-950-845-060-9.
  - Under a Mantle of Stars: A Play in Two Acts, Lumen Books, 1985, ISBN 978-0-930829-00-1
- 1983: El beso de la mujer araña (Kiss of the Spider Woman)
- 1985: La cara del villano (The Face of the Villain)
- 1985: Recuerdo de Tijuana (Memories of Tijuana)
- 1991: Vivaldi: A Screenplay (in Review of Contemporary Fiction No.3)
- 1997: El misterio del ramo de rosas (1987) (Mystery of the Rose Bouquet)
- 1997: La tajada; Gardel, uma lembranca

== See also ==
- List of Argentine writers
- List of LGBT writers
- List of playwrights
- Latin American Literature
