= Guillermo Cabrera Infante =

Cuban writer (1929 – 2005)

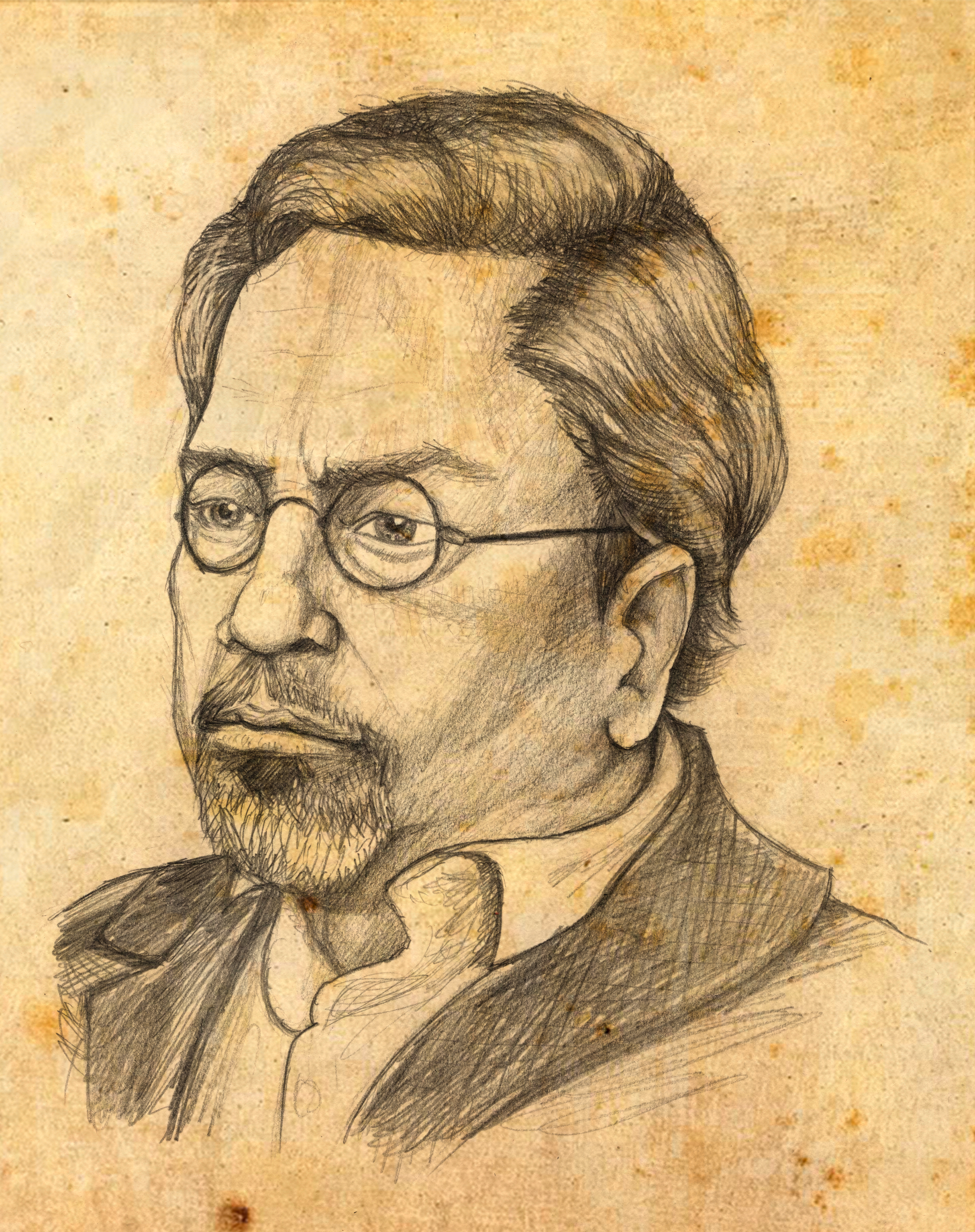
- Portrait of Infante
- Born: Guillermo Cabrera Infante; 22 April 1929; Gibara, Cuba
- Died: 21 February 2005 (aged 75); London, United Kingdom
- Citizenship: Cuba (birthplace), United Kingdom
- Spouse(s): Marta Calvo (1953–1958); Miriam Gómez (1961–2005)
- Children: Ana (b. 1954), Carola (b. 1958)
- Writing career
- Pen name: Guillermo Cain
- Language: Spanish
- Notable awards: Miguel de Cervantes Prize (1997)

Guillermo Cabrera Infante (Spanish pronunciation: [ɡiˈʝeɾmo kaˈβɾeɾa iɱˈfante]; Gibara, 22 April 1929 – 21 February 2005) was a Cuban novelist, essayist, translator, screenwriter, and critic; in the 1950s, he used the pseudonym G. Caín, and he used Guillermo Cain for the screenplay of the cult classic film Vanishing Point (1971).

A one-time supporter of the politics of Fidel Castro, Cabrera Infante went into exile to London in 1965. He is best known for the novel Tres tristes tigres (literally: "three sad tigers", published in English as Three Trapped Tigers), which has been compared favorably to James Joyce's Ulysses.

== Biography ==
Born in Gibara in Cuba's former Oriente Province (now part of Holguín Province), in 1941, he moved with his parents to Havana, which would be the setting of nearly all of his writings other than his critical works. His parents were founding members of the Cuban Communist Party.

Originally, he intended to become a physician, but he abandoned that in favor of writing and his passion for the cinema. Starting in 1950, he studied journalism at the University of Havana. Under the Batista regime, he was arrested and fined in 1952 for publishing a short story which included several English-language profanities. His opposition to Batista later cost him a short jail term.

He married for the first time in 1953. From 1954 to 1960, he wrote film reviews for the magazine Carteles, using the pseudonym G. Caín; he became its editor in chief, still pseudonymously, in 1957. With the triumph of the Cuban Revolution in 1959, he was named director of the Instituto del Cine. He was also head of the literary magazine Lunes de Revolución, a supplement to the Communist newspaper Revolución; however, this supplement was prohibited in 1961 by Fidel Castro.

He divorced in 1961 and in the same year married his second wife, Miriam Gomez, an actress. Having fallen somewhat out of favor with the Castro regime (the government's ban on a documentary on Havana nightlife made by his brother led to his being forbidden to publish in Cuba), he served as a cultural attaché in Brussels, Belgium, from 1962 to 1965. During this time, his sentiments turned against the Castro regime; after returning to Cuba for his mother's funeral in 1965, he went into exile, first in Madrid, then in London.

In 1966, he published Tres tristes tigres, a highly experimental, Joycean novel, playful and rich in literary allusions, which intended to do for Cuban Spanish what Mark Twain had done for American English, recording the great variety of its colloquial variations. It won the 1964 Premio Biblioteca Breve for best unpublished novel.

He co-wrote the script for Richard C. Sarafian's 1971 cult film Vanishing Point under the pseudonym Guillermo Caín.

Although he is considered a part of the famed Latin American Boom generation of writers that includes his contemporary Gabriel García Márquez, he disdained the label. Ever an iconoclast, he even rejected the label "novel" to describe his most acclaimed works, such as Tres tristes tigres and La Habana para un infante difunto. He was influential to Puerto Rican and Cuban writers such as Luis Rafael Sánchez (La guaracha del Macho Camacho) and Fernando Velázquez Medina (Última rumba en La Habana).

In 1997, he received the Premio Cervantes, presented to him by King Juan Carlos of Spain. He died on February 21, 2005, in London, of sepsis. He had two daughters from his first marriage.

== Bibliography ==
- Así en la paz como en la guerra (1960, "In peace as in war"; a pun on a line from the Lord's Prayer), short story collection
- Twentieth Century Job (1963, published in Spanish as "Un oficio del siglo XX"), collection of film reviews
- Tres tristes tigres (1967, published in English as Three Trapped Tigers; the original title refers to a Spanish-language tongue-twister, and literally means "Three Sad Tigers"; portions of this were later republished as Ella cantaba boleros), novel
- Vista del amanecer en el trópico (1974, published in English as "A View of Dawn in the Tropics"), novel
- O (1975), short story / essay collection
- Exorcismos de esti(l)o (1976, "Exorcisms of style"; estilo means style and estío, summertime), novel/short story collection
- La Habana para un Infante Difunto (1979, published in English as Infante's Inferno; the Spanish title is a pun on "Pavane pour une infante defunte", title of a piano piece by Maurice Ravel), novel
- Holy Smoke (1985, in English, later translated into Spanish as Puro Humo), a fictionalized "history" of cigars
- Mea Cuba (1991, the title implies "My Cuba" but also means "Cuba Pisses" or "Cuba is Pissing" and is a pun on "Mea Culpa"), political essays
- Arcadia todas las noches (1995, "Arcadia every night"), essays
- Delito por bailar el chachachá (1995, in English: Guilty of Dancing the ChaChaCha, 2001, translated by himself), short story collection
- Ella Cantaba Boleros (1996, "She Sang Boleros", consists of sections taken from Tres Tristes Tigres), two novellas
- Cine o sardina (1997, "Cinema or sardine", alludes to the choice his mother gave him between eating and going to the movies), collection of articles
- Vidas para leerlas (1998, "Lives to be read"), essays
- El Libro de las Ciudades (1999, "The Book of the Cities"), collection of writings
- Todo está hecho con espejos: Cuentos casi completos (1999, trans. "Everything is Made with Mirrors: Nearly Complete Stories"), short story collection
- Infantería (2000, title is a pun on his name and the Spanish for "infantry"), collection of writings
- La ninfa inconstante (2008, "The Inconstant Nymph", posthumous), novel
- Cuerpos divinos (2010, "Heavenly Bodies", posthumous), autobiographical novel
- Mapa dibujado por un espía (2013, "Map Drawn by a Spy", posthumous), novel

Cabrera Infante also translated James Joyce's Dubliners into Spanish (1972) and wrote screenplays, including Vanishing Point and the adaptation of Malcolm Lowry's Under the Volcano.

== See also ==
- Cuban literature
- Latin American literature
- Caribbean literature
