= Mario Mendoza Zambrano =

Colombian writer

Mario Mendoza
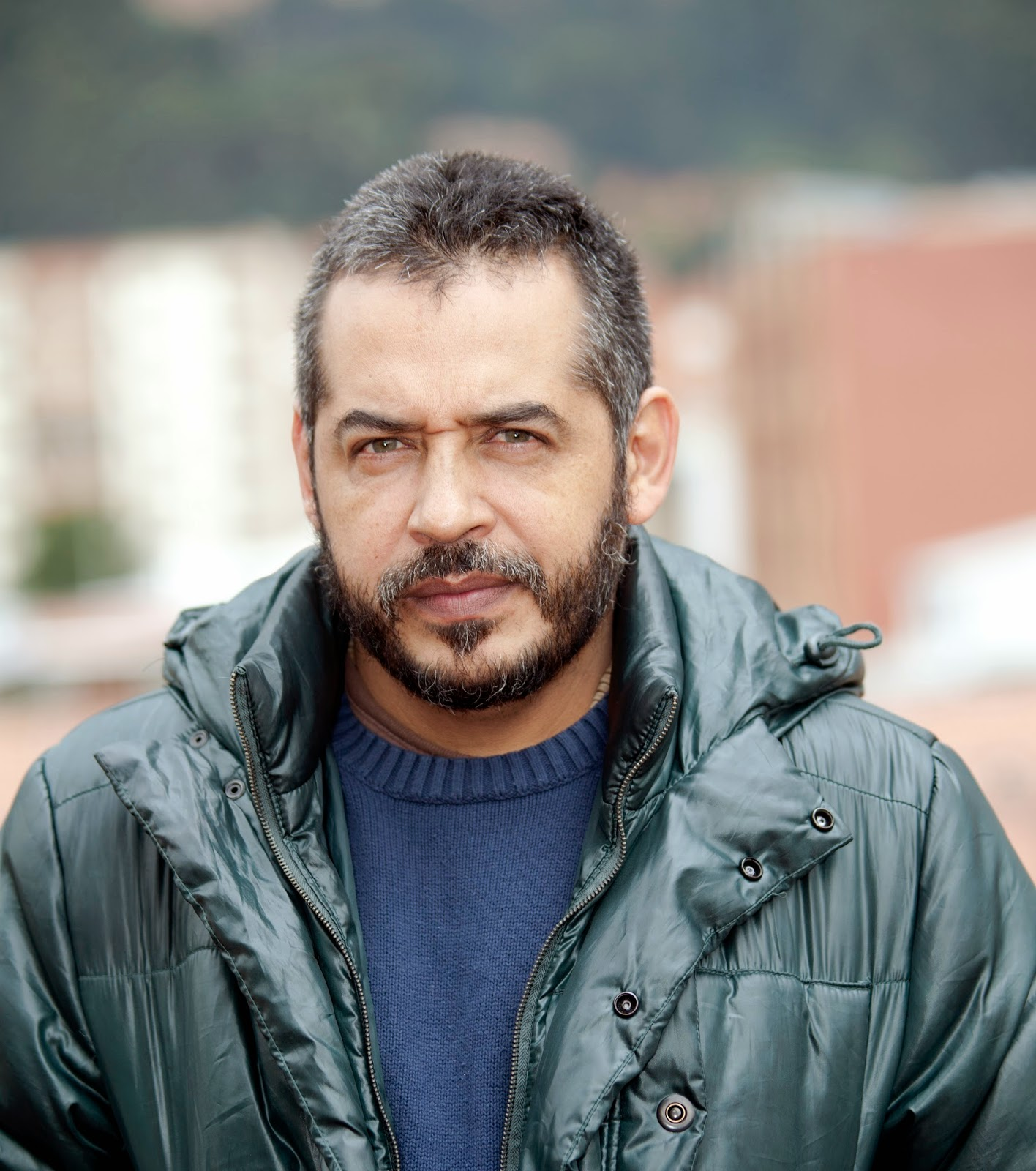
- Born: 1964 (age 61–62); Bogotá, Colombia
- Education: Pontificia Universidad Javeriana
- Writing career
- Genres: Novel, story
- Website: mariomendozaescritorcolombiano.blogspot.com

Mario Mendoza Zambrano (born 10 January 1964) is a Colombian writer, professor, and journalist.

== Biography ==
Mario Mendoza Zambrano was born in 1964 in Bogotá, Colombia. He studied at Colegio Refous and Pontificia Universidad Javeriana, or "La Javeriana", in Bogotá, where he earned an MA in Latin American Literature. Later, he became Professor of Literature at La Javeriana. Mendoza has lived in Toledo, where he took courses of Spanish American literature, and also in Israel, where he lived in Hof Ashkelon. During the fall of 1997, he worked at James Madison University in Virginia, US.

After graduating in 1980, Mendoza began his literary career, combining writing with teaching and working with various print media, including Journal Bacánika and El Tiempo Newspaper, Colombia.

Mendoza won the Seix Barral prize Premio Biblioteca Breve in 2002 for his novel Satanás.

== About his work ==
In his works, Mendoza uses words and imagery to recreate Bogotá. This is first introduced in La Ciudad de los Umbrales, published in 1992, and developed throughout all of his novels. In Mendoza's triptych [Scorpio City (1998), El Relato de un Asesino (2001) and Satanás (2002)], the city of Bogotá is a dark muse whose beauty is dark because it condenses the infernal and the sacred, the criminal and the virtuous, the disgusting and the desirable, the painful and the pleasant. "Through agile and concise prose, Mendoza achieves a milestone in his own narrative universe; a universe in which it is possible to find beauty in the ugly and disgusting, without trying to cover it up with facile catharsis. Since writing proposes a hyper visceral aesthetic, which fears do not travel intricate regions of the human psyche, or skirting the limits of madness."

Mendoza has been a literary advocate for the city of Bogotá for over 20 years, tracing in his novels the neighborhoods, bridges, schools, streets, universities, parks and the changes that the capital of Colombia has experienced in recent decades. Mendoza's work is now recognized as an important part of Colombian urban literature, especially in regard to the representation of the city of Bogotá in Colombian writings.

== Works ==
=== Novel ===
- La ciudad de los umbrales (1994)
- Scorpio City (1998)
- Relato de un asesino (2001)
- Satanás (novel) (2002)
- El viaje del loco Tafur (2003)
- Cobro de sangre (2004)
- Los hombres invisibles (2007)
- Buda Blues (2009)
- Apocalipsis (2011)
- Lady Masacre (2013)
- La melancolía de los feos (2016)
- Diario del fin del mundo (2018)
- Akelarre (2019)

=== Story ===
- La travesía del vidente (1997)
- Una escalera al cielo (2004)
- La locura de nuestro tiempo (2010)
- La importancia de morir a tiempo (2012)
- Los vagabundos de Dios (2024)

=== Junior Novel ===
- Mi extraño viaje al mundo de Shambala (2013)
- La colonia de Altair (2013)
- Crononautas (2013)
- Metempsicosis (2014)
- El hijo del carpintero (2014)

=== Comic and Graphic Novels ===
- 2018 Satanás
- 2019 El Último Día Sobre la Tierra - Volumen 1: Imágenes Premonitorias
- 2019 El Último Día Sobre la Tierra - Volumen 2: Están entre Nosotros
- 2020 El Último Día Sobre la Tierra - Volumen 3: El Astrólogo
- 2020 El Último Día Sobre la Tierra - Volumen 4: Los Híbridos

== Awards ==
- Premio Nacional de Literatura del Instituto Distrital de Cultura y Turismo de Bogotá (1995)
- Premio Biblioteca Breve from Seix Barral for the novel Satanás (2002)
- Premio Nacional de Literatura Libros y Letras (2011)
