= Gabriel Ferrater =

Spanish writer (1922–1972)

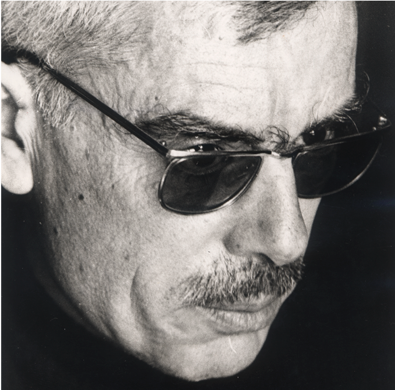

Gabriel Ferrater i Soler (Catalan pronunciation: [ɡəβɾiˈɛl fərəˈte]; 20 May 1922 – 27 April 1972) was an author, translator and scholar of linguistics of the sixties who wrote in the Catalan language. His poetical work is among the most important of the authors of post-war Catalonia and he continues to exert a great deal of influence over literature. He published three collections of poems: Da nuces pueris (1960), Menja't una cama ("Eat a leg", 1962) and Teoria dels cossos ("Theory of bodies"), consequently compiled into a single volume called Les dones i els dies ("Women and days", 1968), which was a milestone in Catalan literature.

== Work ==
His early influences were Thomas Hardy, W. H. Auden, Shakespeare, Brecht, Ausiàs March. Erotism and longing for time lost are frequent topics in his work. The poems In memoriam and Poema inacabat ("Unfinished poem") are some of the most open testimonies of the Spanish Civil War and its consequences, which could be felt at the time he was writing. His style was realistic but featured much strange imagery as well as highbrow sources. Ferrater was an atypical intellectual who had an important influence on the following generations. His poetic work was similar to Robert Graves, Robert Frost or W.H. Auden. He was a professor of linguistics and literary criticism at the Autonomous University of Barcelona and wrote essays and articles on linguistic theory at the Serra d'Or magazine between 1969 and 1972, under the title De causis linguae, including a draft for a metrical theory based on the phonological elements in Chomskyan grammar. He translated into Catalan Kafka's The Trial, Language by Leonard Bloomfield, and Cartesian linguistics by Noam Chomsky. He killed himself in April 1972 in his Sant Cugat flat using a mixture of barbiturates and alcohol.
