= Golden Goblet Award for Best Feature Film =

Chinese film award

The Golden Goblet Award for Best Feature Film (Chinese: 金爵奖最佳影片) is the highest prize awarded to competing films at the Shanghai International Film Festival.

== Awards Winners ==
Year	Film	Director	Country of origin
1993	Hill of No Return	Wang T'ung	Taiwan
1995	Broken Silence	Wolfgang Panzer	Switzerland
1997	The Woodlanders	Phil Agland	United Kingdom
1999	Propaganda	Sinan Cetin	Turkey
2001	Antitrust	Peter Howitt	(United States) U.S.
2002	Life Show	Huo Jianqi	China
2004	Tradition of Lover Killing	Khosro Masumi	Iran
2005	Photo Album of the Village	Mitsuhiro Mihara	Japan
2006	Four Minutes	Chris Kraus	Germany
2007	According to Plan	Franzisca Meletzky	Germany
2008	The Fly	Vladimir Kott	Russia
2009	Original	Alexander Brøndsted; Antonio Tublen	Sweden / Denmark
2010	Kiss Me Again	Gabriele Muccino	Italy
2011	Hayde Bre	Orhan Oğuz	Turkey
2012	The Bear	Khosro Masumi	Iran
2013	The Major	Yuri Bykov	Russia
2014	Little England	Pantelis Voulgaris	Greece
2015	The Night Watchman	Pierre Jolivet	France / Belgium
2016	De Lan	Liu Jie	China
2017	Pedicab	Paolo Villaluna	Philippines
2018	Out of Paradise	Batbayar Chogsom	Switzerland/Mongolia
2019	Castle of Dreams	Reza Mirkarimi	Iran
2020			
2021	Manchurian tiger	Geng Jun	China
2023	Yoko	Kazuyoshi Kumakiri	Japan
2024	The Divorce	Daniyar Salamat	Kazakhstan
2025	Black Red Yellow	Aktan Abdykalykov	Kyrgyzstan
2026	Atlantic Rhapsody	Zhong Kaifeng	China
