= 2008 Shanghai International Film Festival =

Chinese film festival

- Poster for the 2008 SIFF
- Founded: 1993; 33 years ago
- Film titles: Golden Goblet: +1; 8 Days to Premiere; Forever the Moment; The Friend; Loss; Love by Accident; Mukha; My Mother's Tears; Old Fish (also listed as Nick of Time); Paris; Second Hand Wedding; The Taste of Fish; Urtin Duu; Václav; The Viceroys; Women’s Conspiracies; Asian New Talent: 18 Grams Of Love; Exit No. 6; Ganglamedo; Gone Shopping; Kagbeni; Kei Doro; Mr. Zhang and His Dog (also listed as Lucky Dog); Off Road; Thirsty, Thirsty; Winds of September
- No. of films: 16 (Golden Goblet); 10 (Asian New Talent Award)
- Festival date: June 14–22, 2008

Shanghai International Film Festival
- 12th 10th

The 2008 Shanghai International Film Festival is the 11th such festival devoted to international cinema to be held in Shanghai, China. It was held from June 14–22, 2008.

Directly preceding the event, the festival required a new head of the SIFF jury, due to the sudden death of Anthony Minghella. Hong Kong film director Wong Kar-wai was the head of jury at the 2008 film festival, serving along with other jury members such as Chinese-American actress Joan Chen, legendary Danish director Bille August and Israeli stage actress Gila Almagor.

About a month prior to the festival, the area of Sichuan experienced a devastating 8.0 earthquake. In the third week of May, 220,109 injuries and 32,477 deaths were reported; by June 2008, the death toll had risen to 69,100. As a result, the opening ceremonies included a red paper heart being presented to each of the 300 celebrity guests for them to sign.

During the 2008 Cannes Film Festival, U.S. actress Sharon Stone commented that the earthquake might have been because of "bad karma" due to China's actions in the 2008 Tibetan unrest, which resulted in her being banned from the 2008 SIFF. Shanghai festival organizers sent a written condemnation and request for an apology. Prior to the opening of the event, Zhang Ziyi and Jackie Chan recounted the earthquake and acknowledged the charities that had responded to that point in time. The opening ceremony included a posthumous award for Minghella, presented to his widow, Carolyn Choa, and speeches from Zhao Shi and Wong Kar-wai.

A total of 260 films were shown at the 2008 festival, screening in 23 cinemas. Sixteen films competed for the Golden Goblet. The competition lineup included films from China, Europe, Japan, Argentina, South Korea, Lithuania, Russia, the Czech Republic and New Zealand. The Asian New Talent Award competition included ten films, produced in China, Japan, Nepal, Singapore, South Korea, and Taiwan. Festival attendance was between 200,000 and 250,000.

== Jury ==
This year's jury members are:

- Wong Kar-wai (Director, Hong Kong, China, jury president)
- Joan Chen (Actress, United States)
- Ulrich Felsberg (Film producer, Germany)
- Bille August (Director, Denmark)
- Gila Almagor (Actress-writer, Israel)
- Kaori Momoi (Actress, Japan)
- Huo Jianqi (Director, China)

== Awards ==
In competition for the Golden Goblet, the winners were:

- Best Feature Film: Mukha by Vladimir Kott
- Grand Jury Prix: Old Fish by Gao Qunshu
- Best Director: Māris Martinsons for Loss
- Best Screenplay: Marek Epstein for Václav
- Best Cinematography: Florian Schilling for My Mother's Tears
- Best Music: Andrius Mamontovas for Loss
- Best Actress: Emília Vášáryová for Václav
- Best Actor: Ma Guowei for Old Fish

In competition for the Asian New Talent Award, the winners were:

- Best Film: Winds of September
- Best Director: Hyeon-gi Hong for Thirsty, Thirsty

== Sources ==
- "Shanghai fest snubs Sharon Stone". Variety. 2008-06-04.
- "Shanghai Film Festival Seeking Jury Head". Shanghai Daily. 2008-03-22. Archived from the original on July 16, 2011.
- 各地伤亡汇总(实时更新) 最后更新时间：5月19日8时10分 [Summary of Casualties by Region (Real-time Updates) — Last updated: May 19, 08:10]. Sina.com (in Chinese). 2008-05-19. Archived from the original on 2008-05-19.
- "Wong Kar-wai fills in for Minghella at Shanghai film fest". CBC.ca. 2008-06-06. Archived from the original on 7 June 2008.
- "Wong Kar-wai to head Shanghai film festival jury". CNN. 2008-06-10. Archived from the original on 2008-06-11.
- Cremin, Stephen (2008-06-06). "Shanghai announces line-up, Wong Kar-wai to head jury". Screen Daily.
- Dai, Alex S. (2008-06-05). "Wong Kar Wai to head Shanghai jury". The Hollywood Reporter. Associated Press.
- Dai, Alex S. (2008-06-22). "Russian film wins top SIFF award". The Hollywood Reporter.
- Frater, Patrick (2008-06-15). "Shanghai Film Festival bows". Variety.
- Lu, An, ed. (2008-05-18). Magnitude of SW China earthquake revised to 8.0 (Report). Gov.cn. Archived from the original on 2012-02-29.
