= 2018 Shanghai International Film Festival =

Chinese film festival

- Location: Shanghai, China

The 2018 Shanghai International Film Festival, held on June 17–24, 2018, was the 21st such festival devoted to international cinema held in Shanghai, China.

== International Jury ==
The members of the jury for the Golden Goblet Award were:

- Ildikó Enyedi (Hungarian director and screenwriter)
- Semih Kaplanoğlu (Turkish filmmaker)
- Naomi Kawase (Japanese director)
- David Permut (US film producer)
- Qin Hailu (Chinese actress)
- Chang Chen (Chinese actor)

== Official Selections ==
English title	Director(s)	Production country	Notes
Out of Paradise	Batbayar Chogsom	SRG - SSR	(closing night film)
Mori, The Artist's Habitat	Shuicki Okita		
Inuyashiki	Shinsuke Sato		World Premiere
Laplace's Witch	Takashi Miike		
The Blood of Wolves	Kazuya Shirashi		
Recall	Katsuhide Motoki		
White Sun	Ruoxin Yin		
Mickey on the Road			
On the Track of Shadow	Fei Long		
Anchor Baby	Ran Jing		
Lost Land	Tao Gu		
Moerdaoga	CAO Jinling		
Blood And Water	Jianjie Lin		
Game Of Identity	Cheng Liang		
The Fourth Victim	Jimmy Hsu		
Born in Illusive	Liang Sun		
Little Vagabond	Tu Hailun		
Falling in the Mist	Jacob Chen		
The Kidnapping	Yichun Wang		
Gift of Nothing			
The Peaches on the Beach	Jie Zhou		
In City We Trust	Leslie Yeoh		
Alive or Dead	Fu Shaojie		
Sleeping Bride			World Premiere
The Face	Raylene Jin		
An Anthropological Note Of Paris	Zhang Lu		
Tephra	Long Lingyun		
A Story of Hers	Vivian Wang		
The Boy From The Northern Country	Louis Yin		
Out of Service	Gu Yingling		
The Post-Truth World	Chen I-Fu		
Hot Soup	Zhang Ming		
The House			
Alpha	Bo Lin		
Beichuan Photo Studio			
Summer Station	Mai Mai		
Good Night	Hu Jia		
Morikazu Kumagai			World Premiere
Korou No chi/Tire in the Air			World Premiere

== Winners ==
=== Golden Goblet Awards ===
- Best Feature Film: Out of Paradise by Batbayar Chogsom
- Jury Grand Prix: Allagan
- Best Director: Rodrigo Barriuso & Sebastián Barriuso (Un Traductor)
- Best Actor: Tye Sheridan for Friday's Child
- Best Actress: Isabelle Blais for Tadoussac
- Best Screenplay: Tashidawa, Matsuga for Allah Ginger
- Best Cinematography: Jeffrey Bierman for Friday's Child
- Artistic Contribution: Carnivore
- Best Documentary: The Long Season
- Best Animated Movie: The Oath of the Evening Flower-Bringing the Promised Flower to the Parting Dynasty
- Best Animated Short: Tweet Tweet by Zhanna Bekmambetova
- Best Live Action Short: White Sheep in the Car by Xu Min, Tan Diwen

=== Asian New Talent Awards ===
- Best Film: The Road Not Taken
- Best Director: Yui Kiyohara for Our House in Shanghai
- Best Script Writer: Shireen Seno for Nervous Translation
- Best Cinematographer: Ouyang Yongfeng for Blue Amber
- Best Actor: Ding Xihe for Looking For Lucky
- Best Actress: Negar Moghaddam for Dressage in Shanghai

=== Jackie Chan Action Movie Awards ===
- Best Action Movie: Operation Red Sea
- Best Action Movie Director: Wolf Warrior 2
- Best Action Choreographer: Wu Gang for Detective Chinatown 2
- Best Action Movie Actor: Wu Jing for Wolf Warrior 2
- Best Action Movie Actress: (tie) Fatima Sana Shaikh for Dangal and Jiang Luxia for Operation Red Sea
- Best New Action Performer: Sanya Malhotra for Dangal
- Best Special Effects: Operation Red Sea
- Best Fight: Chasing the Dragon
- Best Action Stuntman: Long Cuilong for Detective Chinatown 2
- Best Action Stuntwoman: Chen Jiaojiao for Brotherhood of Blades 2

== Notable Attendees ==
Notable attendees at the festival include Jesse Eisenberg, Smriti Kiran, Kirill Razlogov, Peng Yuyan, Xu Qing, Zhou Yun, Yang Zishan and Xu Zheng/
