= The Scent of Things Remembered =

2025 Portuguese drama film

- Portuguese theatrical release poster
- Portuguese: A Memória do Cheiro das Coisas
- Directed by: António Ferreira
- Written by: Tiago Cravidão; António Ferreira
- Produced by: Tathiani Sacilotto; António Ferreira
- Starring: José Martins; Mina Andala; Maria José Almeida
- Cinematography: Leandro Valente
- Edited by: António Ferreira
- Music by: Luís Pedro Madeira
- Production companies: Persona Non Grata Pictures; Diálogos Atómicos; Muiraquitã Filmes
- Distributed by: Pandora Filmes (Brazil)
- Release dates: 15 June 2025 (Shanghai); 6 November 2025 (Portugal)
- Running time: 96 minutes
- Countries: Portugal; Brazil
- Language: Portuguese

The Scent of Things Remembered (Portuguese: A Memória do Cheiro das Coisas) is a 2025 drama film directed by António Ferreira, and co-written with Tiago Cravidão. A co-production of Portugal and Brazil, it follows Arménio (José Martins), an aging war veteran, who is forced into a retirement home, where he confronts ghosts of his past and forms an unexpected bond with his black caregiver.

The film had its world premiere at the Shanghai International Film Festival on 15 June 2025, where it won Golden Goblet Award for Best Actor for Martins. It was theatrically released in Portugal on 6 November 2025. It was also selected as the Portuguese entry for the Best International Feature Film at the 99th Academy Awards.

== Cast ==
- José Martins as Arménio
- Maria José Almeida as Amélia
- Pedro Lamas as João
- Robson Lemos as Jefferson
- Maria José Almeida (Mizé) as Joana
- Sofia Coelho as Psychologist
- Paula Barata as Laura
- José Castela as Tozé
- Cláudia Carvalho as administrator
- Ricardo Vaz Trindade as funeral home manager
- Francisco Paz as Telles
- Luís Ferreira as Morais
- Mina Andala as Hermínia

== Release ==
The Scent of Things Remembered premiered at the Shanghai International Film Festival on 15 June 2025, where it won Golden Goblet Award for Best Actor. It was featured in the International Perspective section at the 49th São Paulo International Film Festival and was screened on 19 October 2025.

On 3 June 2026 it was screened as part of Narrative Feature section at Bali International Film Festival in Indonesia.

== Accolades ==
Award	Date of ceremony	Category	Recipient	Result	Ref.
Shanghai International Film Festival	23 June 2025	Golden Goblet	The Scent of Things Remembered	Nominated	
Shanghai International Film Festival	23 June 2025	Golden Goblet Award for Best Actor	José Martins	Won	
Sophia Awards	15 May 2026	Best Film	The Scent of Things Remembered	Nominated	
Sophia Awards	15 May 2026	Best Original Screenplay	Tiago Cravidão and António Ferreira	Nominated	
Sophia Awards	15 May 2026	Best Achievement	António Ferreira	Nominated	
Sophia Awards	15 May 2026	Best Leading Actor	José Martins	Won	
Sophia Awards	15 May 2026	Best Leading Actress	Mina Andala	Nominated	
Sophia Awards	15 May 2026	Best Original Score	Luís Pedro Madeira	Won	
Sophia Awards	15 May 2026	Best Assembly	António Ferreira	Won	
Sophia Awards	15 May 2026	Best Sound	Bernardo Theriaga, Matheus Miguens and Ricardo Cutz	Won	
Golden Globes (Portugal)	26 September 2026	Best Film	The Scent of Things Remembered	Nominated	
Golden Globes (Portugal)	26 September 2026	Best Actor	José Martins	Nominated	

== See also ==
- List of submissions to the 99th Academy Awards for Best International Feature Film
- List of Portuguese submissions for the Academy Award for Best International Feature Film
