= The Lives of Things =

Book by José Saramago

- First edition
- Author: Jose Saramago
- Translator: Giovanni Pontiero (2012)
- Language: English
- Publisher: Verso
- Publication date: 2012
- Publication place: United States
- Media type: Print (hardback)
- Pages: x+145 pp (first edition)
- ISBN: 978-1-84467-878-5

The Lives of Things is a short story collection by Portuguese novelist and Nobel-prize winner Jose Saramago. It was originally published in 1978 in Portuguese under the title Objecto Quasi. This article refers to the English translation by Giovanni Pontiero, published by Verso in 2012.

== Plot ==
Several of the stories foreground an inanimate object which is pivotal in historical events or human consciousness. "Chair" is about a mahogany chair which is slowly rotted from within by several generations of anobium though the rot is invisible from the outside. As a consequence of this rot, the chair collapses underneath an unnamed dictator who is identified as former Portuguese Prime Minister António de Oliveira Salazar by the book's translator.

In "Reflux," an unnamed king has such a fear of death that he cannot bear the sight of a funeral procession, grave stones, or black mourning clothes. So he commissions the building of a giant cemetery with high walls in the center of the unnamed country of which he is leader. The cemetery requires major re-engineering and excavation of much of the country's infrastructure. But it does succeed for some years in shielding the king from any visible reminders of death. So many service industries spring up around the cemetery that it effectively becomes a major city. Eventually, though, a cypress tree, which is a symbol of death in some cultures, becomes visible over the wall, and the king realizes that he cannot ultimately defeat death.

In "Things," the objects on which humans rely start rebelling against their exploitation. It starts with a sofa that gets too warm to sit in and proceeds to the disappearance of whole apartment buildings and the deaths of their inhabitants. Humans decide to fight back with an attack on part of the city. Many city dwellers gather together in the countryside to watch the attack. When the attack is imminent, however, the entire city simply disappears. So do all the clothes of the assembled citizens, leaving them without any of the trappings of civilization. It turns out that there is a community of people who have been living in the woods without the benefit of technology or manufacture. At the end of the story, these people comment that never again will people be treated as things.

In "Embargo," an unidentified man finds that he is trapped in his car for no apparent reason. It appears that the car has found a will of its own and refuses to let him leave. The car refuses to go where the man intends to drive. Instead, it keeps getting in line at gas stations even though the tank is nearly full. This takes place during a gas crisis, so the lines are quite long. In the end, the man dies and only then slides out of his car.

"The Centaur" imagines the last of the half-man, half-horse men wandering through the woods avoiding human developments through the centuries. Throughout much of the story, the man part of the centaur experiences life separately from the horse part. For instance, the horse falls asleep while the man is still awake. At the end of the story, the beast/man can no longer endure his loneliness and abducts a woman, though not with any intention to assault her. This draws attention to him for the first time in centuries. A group of men hunts down and surrounds him with nets and weapons. In an attempt to escape, the centaur loses his footing on a steep hill and falls onto a jagged rock which impales him. At the end of the story, he apprehends his own death.

== Composition and Publication ==
Saramago lost his job as deputy director of the newspaper Diário de Nóticias in 1975, for what he believes were political reasons. Convinced that he would be unable to find further employment, he rededicated himself to writing literature after a hiatus of nineteen years. The Lives of Things was written early in this period of renewed commitment to literature and published in 1978, one year after the publication of Saramago's first novel, Manual of Painting and Calligraphy.The Lives of Things was also written in the years that followed the dictatorship of António de Oliveira Salazar. This is worth mentioning because Saramago's work as a whole is often evaluated in the light of his communist ideals and reviews of the English translation of The Lives of Things focused some attention on Saramago's political convictions—which were shaped largely in response to Salazar's government.

An article in the Oxonian suggests several literary influences for Saramago's work as a whole and The Lives of Things in particular. Reviewer Andrew Fleming indicates that Saramago's work has some things in common with magical realist Gabriel García Márquez. However, "There is a lot more going on in Saramago’s prose, attitudes that would restore the menace to 'magical' and the grit to 'realism,'" Fleming writes. A more immediate and obvious influence on Saramago is Fernando Pessoa whose work, like Saramago's, is "ruminative" and "unearthly." In "Embargo," Fleming sees automotive themes that echo the works of J. G. Ballard and Anna Kavan.

== Reception ==
The Lives of Things was reviewed in only a few English-language publications. Reviewers agree that the stories are seminal: their allegorical devices foreshadow Saramago's later, greater works, especially Blindness and The Gospel According to Jesus Christ. Most reviews also find the stories allegorical and pointing to political messages. Most reviews also comment on Saramago's distinctive use of language which features long, unwieldy sentences and eccentric punctuation.

The Wall Street Journal's mostly negative review finds the collection marred by heavy-handed political messages while allowing that the stories are inventive. Reviewer Sohrab Ahmari argues that Saramago's literary imagination was permanently etched by the dictatorship of Salazar. The collection's didactic rejection of capitalism, Ahmari believes, is inevitable because Saramago's life was "so deeply compromised by toxic politics."

By contrast, a University of Rochester review praises the stories' inventiveness and Saramago's ability to splice realistic and supernatural elements into political allegory. Reviewer Aleksandra Fazlipour writes that "with or without the political context, the book is the kind of read that ensnares you, drawing you into its world and forcing you to see things a particular way—Saramago’s way--while you compulsively turn the pages."

BookForum's review finds the political themes of The Lives of Things applicable to contemporary politics. Reviewer Michael Thomsen perceives "Things" as being the collection's centerpiece. Within the world of that story, political leaders become more rigid about enforcing a set of meaningless rules as a response to an increasingly chaotic, unreliable world. "The resonance with our own time is almost too much," Thomsen writes.

Kirkus Reviews' treatment of the book was also positive, though the reviewer predicts the book will be mostly of interest to enthusiasts of Jose Saramago. The same review considers "The Centaur" the best one of the stories, referring to it as a fable about the dual spiritual and animal nature of humans. "The Chair," however, might be difficult to understand for people not familiar with the reign of Salazar, according to Kirkus.

Booklist Reviewer Brendan Driscoll, on the other hand, writes that "The Chair," with its "gripping detail," is the strongest of the stories. Driscoll thinks readers unfamiliar with Saramago should read Blindness or The Cave first, but he finds the stories' "extended metaphors, long sentences, and moral sensibilities" characteristic of Saramago's distinctive style.

Though the stories did not garner any new awards for Saramago, The Lives of Things was cited as one of the books to read in 2012 by a 2011 Irish Times article. "The Centaur" was featured in a Guardian podcast, read aloud by Nadine Gorimer. "Embargo" was the basis for the 2010 film Embargo directed by António Ferreira.
