= Māris Martinsons =

Latvian film director

- Born: 25 July 1960 (age 65); Riga, Latvia
- Occupation: Film director
- Years active: 1989 - present

Māris Martinsons (born 25 July 1960) is a Latvian film director, producer, screenwriter and film editor. From 1991 he has lived and worked in Lithuania, but moved back to his homeland Latvia in 2010.

== Biography ==
After graduating from the Latvia Conservatoires in 1989 as a drama theatre director, Martinsons worked with Latvian musicians as an independent director/producer of music video clips. His first music video clip, "This is My Car" by the band Jumprava, was the first independent video in Latvia’s history and it received the best video award from [reference] in 1989/1990. Since 1991, Māris has lived in Lithuania, where together with a partner he founded the production company “ARTeta” (1994). ARTeta has become a leading production company and the biggest studio complex in the Baltic States.

In Lithuania, Martinsons worked in the TV field, producing over ten original TV series, and creating TV series and videos, where he often served as both the director and author of these productions. Since 2005 he has participated in various workshops in Europe developing skills in script writing, developing and marketing.

In 2006 Martinsons finally wrote a script for the arthouse movie Loss. The script was written in Jaipur, and preparation for the shooting was managed from Bangkok. The film was shot in Lithuania and Ireland, edited just when his third son was born and finished during his visit in Beijing. In January 2008 the film was released in Lithuania. In June 2008 film was selected for the Official Competition of the 11th Shanghai International Film Festival and it was awarded with 2 prizes: Best Director and Best Music. Later this year Loss was submitted as the nominee from Lithuania for Best Foreign Language Film consideration for the 2009 Academy Awards (Oscars).

In 2009-2010 Māris Martinsons coordinated the development of a second feature film Amaya, also known as Hong Kong Confidential. This film stars brilliant Japanese actress Kaori Momoi and Lithuanian musician/actor Andrius Mamontovas. It was notable as the first-ever Latvian-Hong Kong co-production in the film industry. Amaya has received a mixture of acclaim and criticism since its debut screening in Riga, Latvia on 14 September 2010. It was a Best Foreign Language Film nominee from Latvia submitted to the 2011 Academy Awards (Oscars).

This must be a first in Academy Awards (Oscars) history, having the first two movies by the same director/producer nominated by different countries!

On 12 June 2011, the gala Hong Kong premiere of Amaya at the Harbour Road Arts Centre was attended by dignitaries including the Prime Minister of Latvia, Valdis Dombrovskis, the Latvian Ambassador to China, distinguished Professors Roger King and Maris Martinsons (no relation), and many members of the Latvian community in Hong Kong.

In January 2013 the third film by Māris Martinsons Christmas.Uncensored (original title Tyli naktis) has been released in Lithuania. It's a controversial drama, black comedy with a budget of only US$45 000. The National premiere was held right after Māris Martinsons finished to shoot a psychological mystery drama Oki - in the middle of the ocean in Los Angeles, USA. It has been re-union with Japanese actress Kaori Momoi. The film premiere was on 2014. After the release of drama based on legendary Shakespear's novel - Romeo n'Juliet in 2015, passionately worked on the feature film - drama / mystery Magic Kimono starring Kaori Momoi and Issey Ogata. It's been the first co-production ever between Latvia and Japan.

== Filmography ==
- In the land that sings (2024) as director, co-writer, editor
- New Year's Eve Taxi 2 (2019) as director, writer, editor
- New Year's Eve Taxi (2018) as director, writer, editor
- Magic Kimono (2017) as director, writer, editor
- Romeo n'Juliet (2015) as director, co-producer, editor
- Oki - in the middle of the ocean (2014) as director, co-producer, writer, editor
- Christmas.Uncensored (2013) as director, co-producer, writer, editor
- Amaya also known as Hong Kong Confidential (2010) as director, co-producer, editor, writer
- Loss (2008) as director, co-producer, editor, co-writer

== Television filmography ==
- #visi mājās (TV miniseries, 2020) as director, writer, editor
- Būt mīlētai (TV miniseries, 2010) as director, writer, editor
- 42 (TV miniseries, 2007) as director, producer, co-writer
- Anastasia (TV movie, 2006) as director, producer, co-writer
- Anastasia (TV series, 2005) as director, producer, co-writer
- Refresh (TV series, 2004) as author, co-director
- Tenants (TV series, 2004) as author, director
- Julia (TV series, 2002–2003)as author, co-writer, director, producer
- De Facto (TV series, 2002–2003) as author, director
- Shapro show (TV humor show, 2001–2003) as author, director
- Valse of destiny (TV series, 2001–2002) as author, co-writer, co-director, producer
- Grybauskai (TV series, 2000–2001) as co-director
- Ben's diary (TV series, 1999–2000) as author, director, producer

== Bibliography ==
- Zeme, kas dzied. 1873 (2024) co-author with Dainis Īvāns
- Oki-okeāna vidū (2014)
- Tyli naktis (2013)
- Amaya (2010)
- Tortas ir cirkas (2009)
- Neirekalingi žmones (2008)
- 42 (2006) co-author with Raimondas Paškevičius under the common pseudonym

== Awards ==
- Shanghai Film Festival (China)
  - Won: Jin Jue (Golden Goblet) award for Best Director (for Loss)
