= 2001 Shanghai International Film Festival =

Chinese film festival

The 5th Shanghai International Film Festival was film festival held between June 9 and June 17, 2001. 164 films were screened including 46 from China. 14 films were entered into the Golden Cup competition, with Antitrust from the United States winning the grand prize.

The Festival utilized 9 theaters, which held 479 screenings to an aggregate audience of 170,000.

This marked the last time the Shanghai International Film Festival was held on a biannual basis. Beginning with 2001, the festival was held on an annual basis.

== Jury ==
- Zhu Yongde, Chairman of China Film Producers Association (China) (Jury president)
- Eberhard Junkersdorf, film producer (Germany)
- Alan Parker, director (United Kingdom)
- Andrzej Zulawski, director (Poland)
- Gleb Panfilov, director (Russia)
- Lee Chang-Dong, director (South Korea)
- Pan Hong, actress (China)

== In competition ==
Title	Director	Country
The Adopted	Gul Bahar Singh	India
Antitrust	Peter Howitt	United States of America
Bo Ba Bu	Ali Khamraev	Uzbekistan
The Closet	Francis Veber	France
The Full Moon	Chen Li	People's Republic of China
Ikíngut	Gísli Snær Erlingsson	Iceland
The Legend of Bagger Vance	Robert Redford	United States
Money is Not Everything	Juliusz Machulski	Poland
The Purple Sunset	Feng Xiaoning	People's Republic of China
Risotto	Amedeo Fago	Italy
Still Waters	Eldar Ryazanov	Russia
Tainah, an Amazon Adventure	Tania Lamarca	Brazil

== Awards ==
=== Golden Goblet ===
- Best Film- Antitrust (USA)
- Best Director- Peter Howitt (for Antitrust) (USA)
- Best Actor- Daniel Auteuil for The Closet (France)
- Best Actress-
  - Peng Yu for The Full Moon (China)
  - Stanilawa Celinska for Money is not Everything (Poland)
- Best Music- Clande Samard (Bo Ba Bu) (Uzbekistan)
- Best Technology- Michale Ballhans (The Legend of Bagger Vance) (USA)
