= Kult.kino =

Cinema in Basel, Switzerland

kult.kino
- Industry: Cult cinema
- Area served: Switzerland

kult.kino is an independent cinema chain based in Basel, Switzerland. Run by Tobias Faust and Gini Bermond, the business is publicly run, with its profits going back into operations. With its highly curated programs spanning film history, it is considered to be one of Basel's cult cinemas.

== History ==
In 2017, kult.kino made admission to its theaters only five francs for those under 18. They also introduced a new website and program, called sackgeld.kino, where youth can register and receive a card verifying their membership and reduced fees.

Through the COVID-19 pandemic, kult.kino received compensation for lost revenue but still had to cut costs and restructure due to a serious drop in attendance. However, in 2021, kult.kino underwent a transformation project to live-stream previews and events happening in its ateliers.

kult.kino has also served as a venue for film premieres. In 2018, the Mongolian-Swiss film Out of Paradise premiered at the Atelier location.

== Atelier location ==
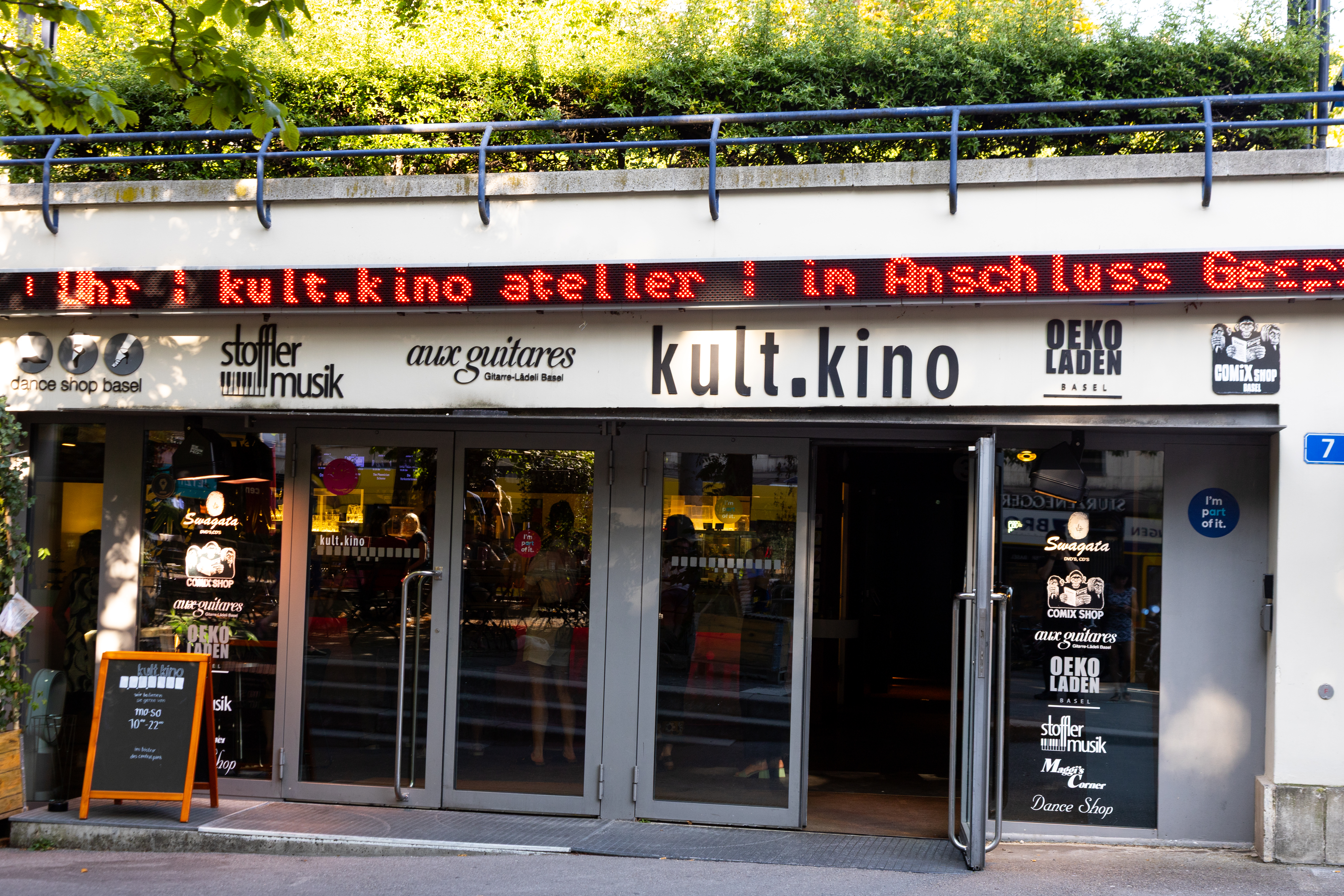
Atelier location in Theaterplatz of Basel, Switzerland.

kult.kino's Atelier location, in the Theaterplatz, is considered the most well-known location of all kult.kino venues.

Originally, the location had only three screens, which it calls "ateliers." In 2013, a 2.5 million franc expansion was planned and submitted to the Basel government; such plans would add two more screens, as well as a bar, a lounge, a bigger foyer, and a restaurant. Two years later, in 2015, the building underwent said expansion.

In 2022, the location planned another expansion by leasing an adjoining music store for additional seating, as well as for an events venue.

In 2023, the location helped plan programming for Theaterplatz Day on April 6 which included participation from other local Swiss institutions like Theater Basel, the Swiss Architecture Museum, and others. In particular, kult.kino hosted a concert by Andrea Samborski and hosted a film quiz.

== Streaming ==
Since 2019, kult.kino has run an online film streaming service called myfilm.ch. It is the first of its kind ever to be based in Switzerland.

During the COVID-19 pandemic, myfilm.ch became immediately popular with the Swiss public, with tens of thousands of subscribers in by 2021. In 2022, the platform expanded with apps on numerous platforms. The same year, Faust reported that myfilm.ch was almost fully sustained by its own revenue.
