= SpectreVision =

American film production company

- Formerly: The Woodshed (2010–2013)
- Type: Private
- Industry: Motion picture
- Founded: 2010
- Founders: Elijah Wood; Daniel Noah; Josh C. Waller
- Headquarters: Los Angeles, California
- Key people: Elijah Wood (Creative Director); Daniel Noah (Head of Development); Lawrence Inglee (President of Production)
- Products: Film production
- Website: spectrevision.com

SpectreVision (formerly The Woodshed) is an American independent film production company founded in 2010 by actor Elijah Wood and directors Daniel Noah and Josh C. Waller. Lawrence Inglee joined as Partner and President of Production in 2024, Waller having previously moved on from the company.

SpectreVision is a genre driven company with a focus on psychological thriller and horror films. SpectreVision is in association with Company X Productions, which describes itself as "a female-led production company focused on independent film and television." Company X Marketing states, "Company X / SpectreVision is a TV and film production company owned in part by Elijah Wood." Its production credits include The Greasy Strangler, Seven Stages to Achieve Eternal Bliss, No Man of God, Bitch, and The Apology.

At E3 2017, SpectreVision announced a collaboration with video game developer Ubisoft on their first video game project, a virtual reality project called Transference.

In 2024, Spectrevision launched a podcast network called Spectrevision Radio. Included on the network is the podcast Visitations, which is hosted by Wood and Noah.

== Filmography ==
Year	Film	Director	Notes and Awards
2012	Toad Road	Jason Banker	Won Best Picture at the Oregon Independent Film Festival
2013	LFO	Antonio Tublén	Won Best Film at the London Sci-Fi Film Festival
2014	Cooties	Cary Murnion; Jonathan Milott	Nominated for Best Indie Horror Film at 2016 iHorror Awards
2014	A Girl Walks Home Alone at Night	Ana Lily Amirpour	
2014	Open Windows	Nacho Vigalondo	Nominated for SXSW Audience Visions Award.
2015	The Boy	Craig Macneill	
2016	The Greasy Strangler	Jim Hosking	Won the [2016 BIFA Discovery Award]
2016	Belladonna of Sadness	Eiichi Yamamoto	Restored re-release of 1973 film.
2017	Bitch	Marianna Palka	
2018	Mandy	Panos Cosmatos	
2019	Daniel Isn't Real	Adam Egypt Mortimer	Won Best Feature (Horror Feature Competition) at 2019 Brooklyn Horror Film Festival.
2019	Color Out of Space	Richard Stanley	
2020	Seven Stages to Achieve Eternal Bliss	Vivieno Caldinelli	
2020	Archenemy	Adam Egypt Mortimer	
2021	No Man of God	Amber Sealey	
2022	The Apology	Alison Locke	
2025	Rabbit Trap	Bryn Chainey	
TBA	The Land of Nod	Kyle Edward Ball	

== Video games ==
Year	Video game	Publisher	Notes
2018	Transference	Ubisoft	Co-developed with Ubisoft Montreal, nominated for Best VR Game at the 2018 Golden Joystick Awards and "Immersive Reality Game of the Year" at the 22nd Annual D.I.C.E. Awards.
2018	JoinDispatch	Kyle McCullough	
