= Golden Goblet Award for Best Actor =

Chinese film award

The Golden Goblet Award for Best Actor (Chinese: 金爵奖最佳男演员) is a prize given to the films in the main category of Competition at the Shanghai International Film Festival.

== Award winners ==
Year	Film	Actor
1993	Priest Daens	(Belgium) Jan Decleir
1995	Les Milles	(France) Jean-Pierre Marielle
1997	Traveling Companion	(France) Michel Piccoli
1999	Laugh, So The Photo Will Be Beautiful	(Egypt) Ahmed Zaki
2001	The Closet	(France) Daniel Auteuil
2002	Hart's War	(Republic of Ireland) Colin Farrell
2003	no award this year	
2004	Evil	(Sweden) Andreas Wilson
2005	Village Photobook	(Japan) Tatsuya Fuji
2006	Sauf le respect que je vous dois	(France) Olivier Gourmet
2007	Cabeza de perro	(Spain) Juan José Ballesta
2008	Old Fish	(China) Ma Guowei
2009	Original	(Denmark) Sverrir Gudnason
2010	Wedding Fever in Campobello	(Germany) Christian Ulmen
2011	Hayde Bre	(Turkey) Sevket Emrulla
2012	The Conductor	(Russia) Vladas Bagdonas
2013	Unbeatable	(Hong Kong) Nick Cheung
2014	The Last Executioner	(Thailand) Vithaya Pansringarm
2015	The Dead End	(China) Deng Chao/Duan Yihong/Guo Tao
2016	Cock and Bull	(China) Liu Ye
2017	The Conformist	(China) Huang Bo
2018	Friday's Child	(United States) Tye Sheridan
2019	Castle of Dreams	(Iran) Hamed Behdad
2019	The Return	(Taiwan) Chang Feng
2021	The Contrary Route	(Iran) Pouyan Shekari
2023	Dust To Dust	(China) Da Peng
2023	All Ears	(China) Hu Ge
2024	Mostly Sunny	(China) Huang Xiaoming
2025	The Scent of Things Remembered	(Portugal) José Martins
2026	Secret in the Box	(China) Zhang Songwen
