= Negar Moghaddam =

Iranian actress (born 1999)

- نگار مقدم
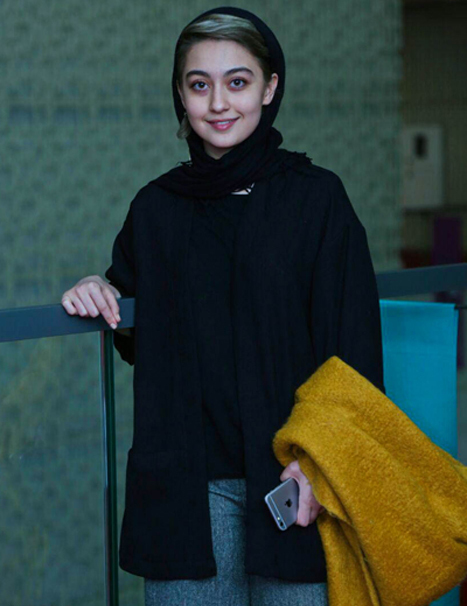
- Moghaddam at the 2018 Fajr International Film Festival
- Born: May 30, 1999 (age 26)
- Occupation: Actress
- Years active: 2018–present

Negar Moghaddam (Persian: نگار مقدم, born May 30, 1999) is an Iranian actress. She is known for her role as Golsa in the 2018 Iranian coming-of-age drama Dressage, for which she won the Best Asian New Talent Actress Award at the 21st Shanghai International Film Festival.

== Filmography ==
=== Film ===
Year	Title	Role	Director	Notes	Ref(s)
2018	Dressage	Golsa	Pouya Badkoobeh		

=== Web ===
Year	Title	Role	Director	Platform	Notes	Ref(s)
2025	The Savage		Houman Seyyedi	Filmnet		

== Awards and nominations ==
Name of the award ceremony, year presented, category, nominee of the award, and the result of the nomination
Award	Year	Category	Nominated Work	Result	Ref(s)
CinemaCinema Academy Awards	2019	Best Actress	Dressage	Nominated	
Shanghai International Film Festival	2018	Best Asian New Talent Actress	Dressage	Won	
