= Hong Kong Confidential =

Hong Kong Confidential may refer to:

- Hong Kong Confidential (1958 film), a film by Edward L. Cahn
- Hong Kong Confidential (2010 film), a film by Māris Martinsons
