= Tye Sheridan =

American actor (born 1996)

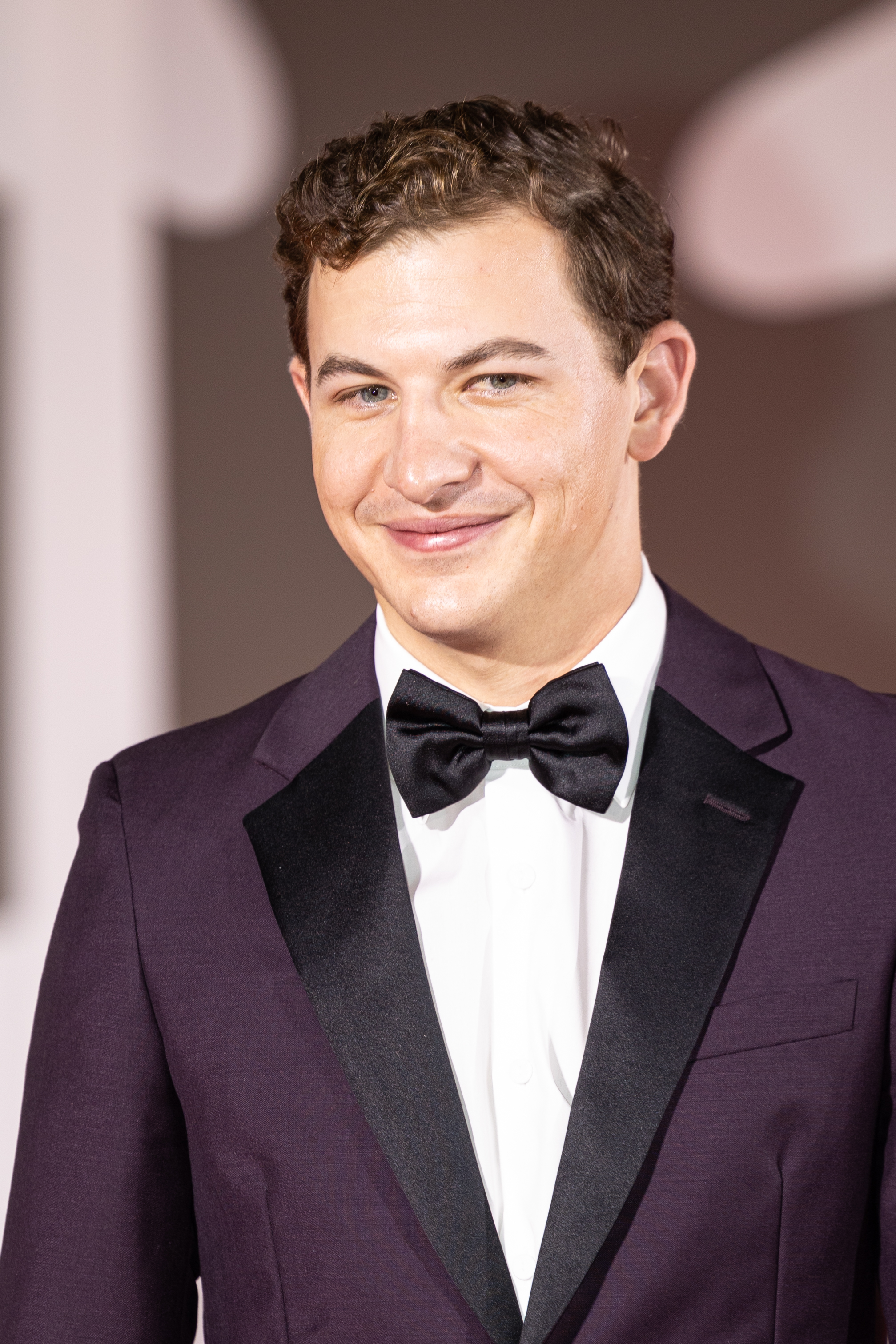
- Sheridan in 2024
- Born: Tye Kayle Sheridan; November 11, 1996 (age 29); Palestine, Texas, U.S.
- Occupation: Actor
- Years active: 2007–present

Tye Kayle Sheridan (born November 11, 1996) is an American actor. He made his feature film debut in Terrence Malick's experimental drama film The Tree of Life (2011) and had his first leading role in Jeff Nichols's film Mud (2012).

Sheridan gained wider recognition for playing a young Scott Summers / Cyclops in the X-Men film series (2016–2019) and for his starring role in the science fiction film Ready Player One (2018). His other film roles were in the dramas Joe (2013), The Stanford Prison Experiment (2015), The Card Counter, The Tender Bar (both 2021), and The Order (2024).

== Early life ==
Sheridan was born in Palestine, Texas. His mother, Stephanie Sheridan owns a beauty salon, and his father, Bryan Sheridan, is a driver for UPS. He has a younger sister, Madison. He was enrolled in the Elkhart Independent School District until his film career became a priority focus when he was 16 years old, and he received tutoring on film sets.

== Career ==
=== 2010s ===
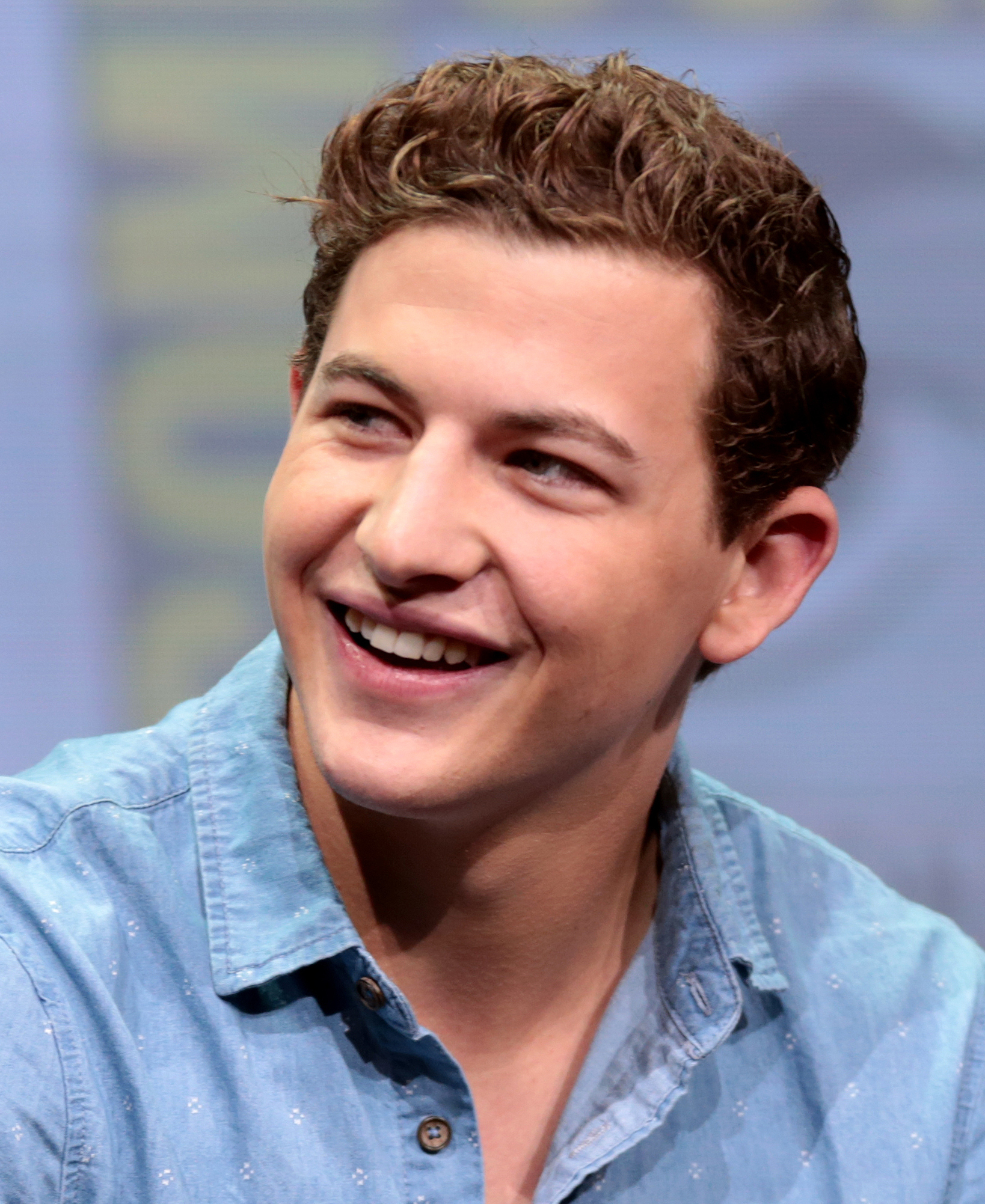
Sheridan in 2017

Sheridan made his feature film debut in the Terrence Malick art film The Tree of Life (2011), with Brad Pitt, Jessica Chastain, and Sean Penn, after an almost year-long casting search involving more than 10,000 children from Texas and Oklahoma. The film premiered at the 2011 Cannes Film Festival, and went on to be awarded the Palme d'Or and nominated for the Academy Award for Best Picture.

In 2012, he played the leading role of Ellis in Jeff Nichols' Mud opposite Jacob Lofland and Matthew McConaughey. The coming-of-age drama-thriller film premiered at the 2012 Cannes Film Festival and Sheridan received a Critics' Choice Award nomination.

Sheridan played Gary Jones in the film Joe, which stars Nicolas Cage playing an ex-con who meets a 15-year-old boy, the eldest child in a homeless family headed by an alcoholic father, and is faced with the choice of redemption or ruin. For his role he received the Marcello Mastroianni Award for best upcoming young actor at the 70th Venice International Film Festival.

In 2015, Sheridan starred in the three films that premiered at the Sundance Film Festival. He co-starred opposite Gregg Turkington and Michael Cera in the drama Entertainment, played a prisoner in the film adaptation of The Stanford Prison Experiment, and appeared in Rodrigo Garcia's drama Last Days in the Desert opposite Ewan McGregor, released May 2016. That year, he also had a supporting role in the film adaptation of Gillian Flynn's Dark Places and the leading role in the horror comedy Scouts Guide to the Zombie Apocalypse. Sheridan played the mutant Scott Summers/Cyclops in the film X-Men: Apocalypse (2016), released on May 27, 2016.

In 2017, Sheridan starred in the war drama The Yellow Birds (2017), opposite Alden Ehrenreich, Jack Huston, and Jennifer Aniston. Also that year, Sheridan co-starred with Kaitlyn Dever in Grass Stains, a film written and directed by Kyle Wilamowski. In 2018, Sheridan played Wade Watts, a.k.a. Parzival, the lead character in Steven Spielberg's science fiction blockbuster film Ready Player One. He then reprised the role of Scott Summers/Cyclops in the 2019 film Dark Phoenix.

=== 2020s ===
In 2020, Sheridan starred alongside Ana de Armas, John Leguizamo and Helen Hunt in Michael Cristofer's crime drama film The Night Clerk, which was released on February 21, 2020, by Saban Films and he was cast as the lead role in the survival thriller series Wireless, which premiered on September 13, 2020, on Quibi. In the same year, Sheridan took a voice role in the "Face of the Franchise" mode of Madden NFL 21. Also the same year, he co-founded AI production tools company Wonder Dynamics with visual effects artist Nikola Todorovic. Autodesk acquired the company in May 2024.

In 2021, Sheridan co-starred in the Neil Burger sci-fi thriller Voyagers (2021) with Colin Farrell, Lily-Rose Depp, Isaac Hempstead Wright, and Fionn Whitehead. In the same year, Sheridan starred in the crime drama film The Card Counter opposite Oscar Isaac, Tiffany Haddish and Willem Dafoe, which premiere at the 78th Venice International Film Festival on September 2, 2021, and was released on September 10, 2021, by Focus Features. Also the same year, Sheridan co-starred Ben Affleck, Lily Rabe and Christopher Lloyd in the coming-of-age movie The Tender Bar directed by George Clooney, in which he played the lead character named JR Maguire.

In 2023, Sheridan starred alongside Sean Penn in the thriller drama film Asphalt City, based on the 2008 novel, "Black Flies", by Shannon Burke, which was released on May 18, 2023. The film originally had the Black Flies name, but was changed prior to its US release.

In 2024, Sheridan joined the cast in the crime thriller film The Order directed by Justin Kurzel, based on the 1989 non-fiction book The Silent Brotherhood by Kevin Flynn and Gary Gerhardt, which premiered in competition on August 31, 2024 at the 81st Venice International Film Festival.

In 2026, Sheridan starred in the drama film The Housewife alongside Naomi Watts, Michael Imperioli, Luke Evans, Lena Olin and Debi Mazar, directed by Ben Shirinian, released on September 10, 2026.

== Filmography ==
=== Film ===
Year	Title	Role	Notes
2011	The Tree of Life	Steve O'Brien	
2012	Mud	Ellis	
2013	Joe	Gary Jones	
2014	The Forger	William “Will” Cutter	
2015	Entertainment	Eddie the Opener	
2015	Last Days in the Desert	Son	
2015	The Stanford Prison Experiment	Peter Mitchell	
2015	Dark Places	Benjamin “Ben” Day (young)	
2015	Scouts Guide to the Zombie Apocalypse	Benjamin “Ben” Goudy	
2016	Detour	Harper James	
2016	X-Men: Apocalypse	Scott Summers / Cyclops	
2017	The Yellow Birds	Daniel Murphy	
2017	All Summers End	Conrad Stevens	
2017	Crow: The Legend	Turtle (voice)	Short film
2018	Ready Player One	Wade Watts / Parzival	
2018	Age Out	Richie	
2018	Deadpool 2	Scott Summers / Cyclops	Cameo appearance
2018	The Mountain	Andy	
2019	Dark Phoenix	Scott Summers / Cyclops	
2020	The Night Clerk	Bartholomew “Bart” Bromley	Also producer
2021	Voyagers	Christopher	
2021	The Card Counter	Cirk	
2021	The Tender Bar	J. R. Moehringer	
2023	Asphalt City	Ollie Cross	Also producer
2024	The Order	Jamie Bowen	
2026	The Housewife	Joseph Lelyveld	

=== Television ===
Year	Title	Role	Notes
2014	Last Man Standing	Justin	3 episodes
2020	Wireless	Andy Braddock	10 episodes

=== Video games ===
Year	Title	Role	Notes
2020	Madden NFL 21	Tommy Matthews	Also motion capture

== Awards and nominations ==
Year	Award	Category	Work	Result
2012	Central Ohio Film Critics Association	Best Ensemble (shared with The Tree of Life crew)	The Tree of Life	Nominated
2013	Marcello Mastroianni Award at the 70th Venice International Film Festival	Best New Young Actor	Joe	Won
2013	Washington D.C. Area Film Critics Association Award	Best Youth Performance	Mud	Won
2013	Chicago Film Critics Association Awards 2013	Most Promising Performer	Mud	Nominated
2013	Phoenix Film Critics Society Award	Best Performance by a Youth in a Lead or Supporting Role - Male	Mud	Won
2013	Las Vegas Film Critics Society Award	Youth in Film	Mud	Won
2013	Georgia Film Critics Association	Breakthrough Award	Joe, Mud	Nominated
2014	Robert Altman Award At Independent Spirit Awards	Best Ensemble (shared with Mud crew)	Mud	Won
2014	Critics' Choice Movie Award	Best Young Actor/Actress	Mud	Nominated
2014	Empire Awards	Empire Award for Best Male Newcomer	Mud	Nominated
2017	Nickelodeon Kids' Choice Awards	Favorite Squad (shared with X-Men: Apocalypse crew)	X-Men: Apocalypse	Nominated
2018	2018 MTV Movie & TV Awards	Best Kiss (with Olivia Cooke)	Ready Player One	Nominated
2018	2018 MTV Movie & TV Awards	Best On-Screen Team (with Olivia Cooke, all of the Overlook Hotel characters, Philip Zhao, Win Morisaki and Lena Waithe)	Ready Player One	Nominated
2018	2018 Teen Choice Awards	Choice Sci-Fi Movie Actor	Ready Player One	Nominated
2018	Shanghai International Film Festival	Golden Goblet Award for Best Actor	Friday's Child	Won
