= LFO (film) =

- Directed by: Antonio Tublén
- Written by: Antonio Tublén
- Produced by: Alexander Brøndsted; Fredric Ollerstam; Antonio Tublén
- Starring: Patrik Karlson; Izabella Jo Tschig; Per Löfberg; Ahnna Rasch; Lukas Loughran; Erik Börén; Björn Löfberg Egner
- Cinematography: Alexander Brøndsted; Linus Eklund
- Edited by: Antonio Tublén
- Music by: Antonio Tublén
- Production companies: Pingpongfilm; SpectreVision
- Distributed by: SpectreVision; MPI Media Group
- Release dates: September 21, 2013 (Fantastic Fest); October 28, 2014
- Running time: 94 minutes
- Countries: Sweden; Denmark
- Language: Swedish

LFO is a 2013 Swedish science fiction film directed and written by Antonio Tublén about a man who realizes that he can hypnotize with sound. He starts experimenting on his neighbors, where the abuse of power takes over and, eventually, severe consequences for mankind are at stake.

== Plot ==
Robert Nord, an awkward man, spends most of his time playing with his synthesizers in his basement. After he has an argument with his wife Clara, whom he suspects is cheating on him, he returns to the basement again, to her annoyance. There, over the Internet, he discusses with several of his friends his belief that he has what he calls a "sound allergy" to the music that his wife enjoys. He proposes that a certain frequency could act as the opposite of this allergy and give him the peace that he desires. With the help of Sinus-San, one of his friends from the Internet, he makes a breakthrough, though he hides the extent of his success. When Simon and Linn move next door to him, he resolves to experiment on them over the objections of his wife.

Robert invites over his new neighbors. Before he leaves to get the coffee, he casually mentions that his family was killed in a car crash. Uncomfortable with the awkwardness of the conversation, Simon tells Clara that he intends to leave. However, when Robert returns, he plays a hypnotic frequency that compels them to obey his commands. He orders Simon to perform menial tasks and Linn to have sex with him. When Clara calls him pathetic, he defends his actions as being necessary to test the extent of his control. Eventually, it is revealed that Clara and his son, Sebastian, died when Robert sabotaged the family car. Clara chides him to take his antipsychotic medicine, pointing out that she is a hallucination, but Robert refuses. Instead, he forces Simon and Linn to take the place of his dead family members.

After several weeks of servitude at his house, his neighbors are reported missing, and the police show up at Robert's house to ask him if he has seen them. Robert panics and hypnotizes the police into leaving his house. Unsatisfied with his fake family, he releases Simon and Linn, though he monitors their life using security devices. When Linn accidentally discovers through the security device that Simon has been cheating on her, Robert hypnotizes them into accepting him as their marriage counselor. Robert again forces Linn to have sex with him, and he forces Simon to passively watch as punishment for cheating on her. When he tires of this, he again releases them from his control and amuses himself with mean-spirited pranks on his other neighbors. Clara urges him to find a more meaningful life.

Over time, the car manufacturer and police become interested in Robert's involvement in the deaths of his wife and son. Sinus-San, who has been investigating Robert, threatens to go to the police unless Robert shares his invention. Robert hypnotizes Sinus-San and a representative of the car manufacturer, but the case against him continues. Frustrated with both the state of the world and his inability to be left in peace, Robert decides to broaden his experiment. He first compels Simon and Linn to form a rock band with him, but he abandons that idea when their songs turn out amateurish. Robert then asks Simon and Linn for advice, and they describe their vision of a utopian society. Intrigued by their protestations that he should not play God, Robert asks them to define God.

Armed with their conception of a benevolent deity, Robert hypnotizes himself to emulate those qualities. Robert practices learning various foreign languages, and a series of voice-overs report that he has attained increasingly more prestigious positions in society, ultimately rising to the position of ruler of a unified Earth. At first, he forces through sweeping changes to society, but his message becomes increasingly pessimistic and antihumanist until he commands the entire human race to commit mass suicide.

== Cast ==
- Patrik Karlson as Robert Nord
- Izabella Jo Tschig as Linn
- Per Löfberg as Simon
- Ahnna Rasch as Clara
- Lukas Loughran as Peter
- Erik Börén as Sinus-San
- Björn Löfberg Egner as Sebastian

== Release ==
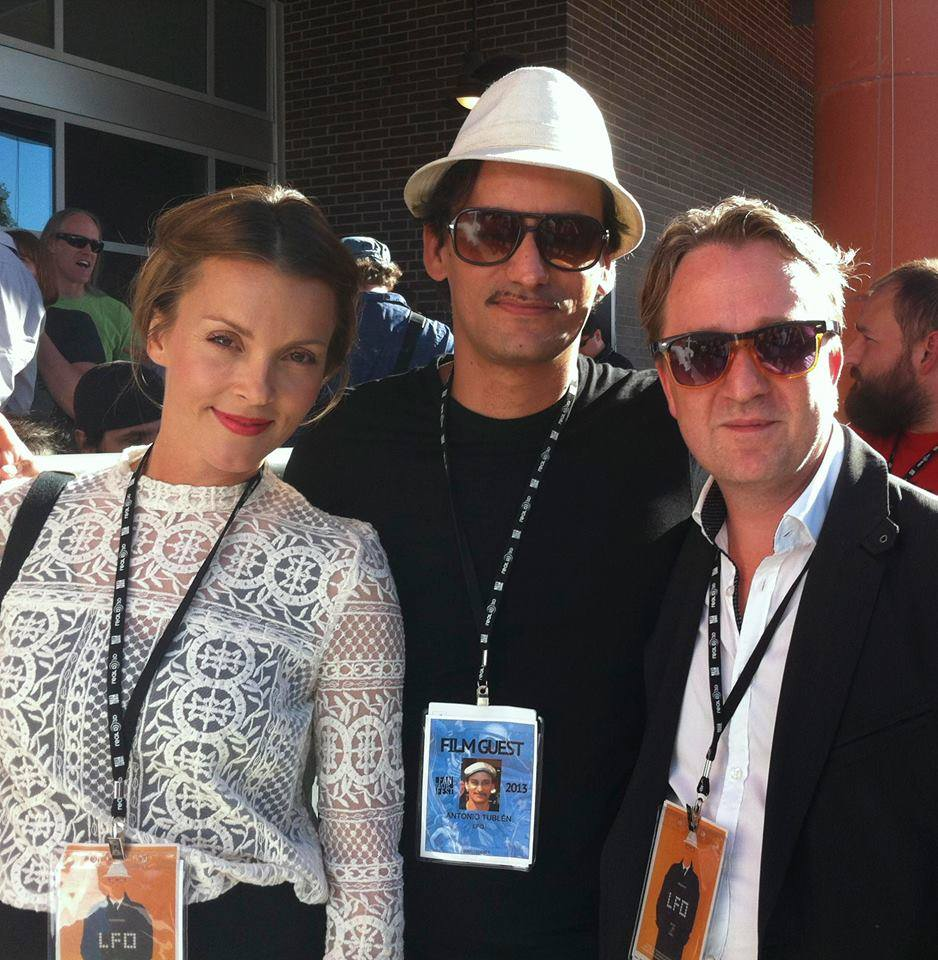
Izabella Jo Tschig, Antonio Tublén and Patrik Karlson at Fantastic Fest, 2013

LFO premiered on September 21, 2013 at the Fantastic Fest film festival in Austin. Director Antonio Tublén was joined in attendance by the two stars Patrik Karlson and Izabella Jo Tschig and producers Alexander Brøndsted and Fredric Ollerstam.

In April 2014 MPI Media Group announced that it had acquired U.S. distribution and international sales rights to LFO under their Dark Sky Films banner. In the same press release it was announced that the film production company SpectreVision, founded by Elijah Wood, Daniel Noah and Josh C Waller, had come on board to present LFO, serving as executive producers.

== Reception ==
After the premiere, Peter Martin of Twitch Film wrote, "LFO is a diabolical joy to watch". Stephen Dalton of The Hollywood Reporter called it a "witty sci-fi thriller". Brad Miska of Bloody Disgusting rated it 4/5 stars and described it as a "strange and rather darkly funny exploration of manipulation and power". Quiet Earth wrote that the film "is not only an exercise in how to breathe new life into the Mad Scientist story, but also a smart, funny head trip so solidly crafted that it easily ranks among the best of this year's fest, and is one of the finest films of its kind I've seen in years".

== Awards and nominations ==
| Year | Festival | Category | Result |
|---|---|---|---|
| 2013 | Minneapolis Underground Film Festival | Best Feature Film | Won |
| 2013 | Ithaca International Fantastic Film Festival | Best Feature Film | Nominated |
| 2014 | Fantasporto International Film Festival | Manoel De Oliveira Award | Nominated |
| 2014 | BIFFF | 7th Orbit Award | Won |
| 2014 | Festival Mauvais Genre | Prix du public long-métrage | Won |
| 2014 | Sci-Fi London | Best Feature | Won |
| 2014 | Fantaspoa | Best Feature | Nominated |
| 2014 | Lund International Fantastic Film Festival | Melies D'Argent | Nominated |
| 2014 | Sitges International Film Festival | Noves Visions | Nominated |
| 2014 | Fancine | Best Feature | Nominated |

== Festival screenings ==
| year | festival | selection |
|---|---|---|
| 2013 | Fantastic Fest | Official |
| 2013 | Minneapolis Underground Film Festival | Official |
| 2013 | Spectrefest | |
| 2013 | Ithaca International Fantastic Film Festival | Official |
| 2013 | Torino International Film Festival | Official |
| 2014 | Pune International Film Festival | |
| 2014 | Boston Sci-Fi Fest | |
| 2014 | Glasgow Film Festival | Official |
| 2014 | Fantasporto | Official |
| 2014 | SFF-rated ATHENS | Official |
| 2014 | Cleveland International Film Festival | Official |
| 2014 | SCI-FI-LONDON Film Festival | Official |
| 2014 | Belfast Film Festival | Official |
| 2014 | BIFFF | Official |
| 2014 | Festival Mauvais Genre | Official |
| 2014 | Stanley Film Festival | Official |
| 2014 | Fantaspoa | Official |
| 2014 | PiFan | Official |
| 2014 | Calgary International Film Festival | Official |
| 2014 | Grimmfest | Official |
| 2014 | Lund International Fantastic Film Festival | Official |
| 2014 | Sitges International Film Festival | Official |
| 2014 | Fancine | Official |
| 2014 | Randevu Istanbul International Film Festival | |
| 2015 | Tromsø International Film Festival | Official |
| 2015 | Muestra Syfy de Cine Fantástico | Official |
| 2015 | Uluslararası Eskişehir Film Festivali | Official |

== Official releases ==
- LFO was released on iTunes, Amazon Video and other digital platforms on October 28, 2014. It was later added on Netflix in over 25 countries on December 27, 2014.
- LFO was released by Monster Pictures on DVD in Australia on July 22, 2015.
- LFO was released on DVD in the UK and Italy on November 9, 2015.
- AMC Networks owned VOD-channel Shudder released LFO on VOD on July 1, 2016.
- LFO was finally released on Apple TV in July 2020.
