= Dressage (film) =

- Film poster
- Persian: درساژ
- Directed by: Pooya Badkoobeh
- Written by: Hamed Rajabi
- Produced by: rouhollah baradari
- Starring: Negar Moghaddam; Ali Mosaffa
- Cinematography: Ashkan Ashkani
- Edited by: Sepideh Abdolvahab
- Music by: Shahab Paranj
- Production company: DreamLab Films
- Distributed by: Khane film
- Release date: February 18, 2018 (Berlin)
- Running time: 100 minutes
- Country: Iran
- Language: Persian

Dressage (Persian: درساژ) is a 2018 Iranian coming-of-age thriller drama film directed by Pooya Badkoobeh. The film tells the story of a 16-year-old girl and her problems and reflects on social divisions within contemporary Iranian society and indicts the middle and upper classes that have lost their moral centre. The film is Badkoobeh's directorial debut.

== Cast ==
- Negar Moghaddam as Golsa
- Yasna Mirtahmasb as Amir
- Ali Mosaffa as Golsa's father
- Shabnam Moghadami as Golsa's mother
- Behafarid Ghafarian as Shirin
- Alireza Sanifar as Saeed

== Reception ==
Dressage was nominated for Best First Film and received a Special Jury Mention at the 2018 Berlin International Film Festival's Generation 14-Plus Awards. At the 2018 Shanghai International Film Festival, Negar Moghaddam won the Asian New Talent Award for Best Actress.
