= Village Photobook =

- DVD cover
- Directed by: Mitsuhiro Mihara
- Written by: Mitsuhiro Mihara
- Produced by: Kazushi Miki
- Starring: Tatsuya Fuji; Ken Kaitō; Tomoyo Harada
- Cinematography: Shigeru Honda
- Edited by: Ryūji Miyajima
- Music by: Kei Ogura
- Release date: April 23, 2004 (Japan)
- Running time: 111 minutes
- Country: Japan
- Language: Japanese

Village Photobook (Japanese: 村の写真集, Hepburn: Mura no Shashinshū), also known as Photo Album of the Village or The Village Album, is a 2004 Japanese drama film written and directed by Mitsuhiro Mihara and starring Tatsuya Fuji . It won the Golden Goblet Award for Best Feature Film at the 2005 Shanghai International Film Festival.

== Cast ==
- Tatsuya Fuji as Kenichi Takahashi
- Ken Kaitō
- Tomoyo Harada
- Mao Miyaji
- Ren Osugi
- Pace Wu
