= Loss (film) =

2008 film by Māris Martinsons

- Theatrical poster
- Lithuanian: Nereikalingi žmonės
- Directed by: Māris Martinsons
- Written by: Māris Martinsons; Raimondas Paškevičius
- Produced by: Živile Gallego; Linda Krukle; Māris Martinsons
- Starring: Valda Bičkutė; Kostas Smoriginas; Dalia Micheleviciute; Andrius Mamontovas; Daiva Tamošiūnaitė-Budrė
- Cinematography: Gints Bērziņš, LGC
- Edited by: Māris Martinsons
- Music by: Andrius Mamontovas
- Distributed by: Forum cinemas
- Release date: 11 January 2008
- Running time: 95 minutes
- Country: Lithuania
- Language: Lithuanian
- Budget: 2.1 million litas

Loss (Lithuanian: Nereikalingi žmonės, literary "Unnecessary people") is a 2008 Lithuanian psychological thriller film directed, co-written and co-produced by Latvian film director Māris Martinsons. In October 2008, it was announced that the film was Lithuania's submission for the Academy Award for Best Foreign Language Film in the 81st Academy Awards, becoming the first Lithuanian feature film ever to be submitted for the Academy Awards.

== Awards ==
The international premiere of Loss was held in 2008 Shanghai International Film Festival, where it was awarded with 2 Jin Jue (Golden Goblet) awards: Best Director for Māris Martinsons and Best Music for Andrius Mamontovas. It is the first Lithuanian feature film to be screened in the competition of an A class festival and awarded prestigious prizes.

In 2009 Loss was awarded with the Lielais Kristaps award, Latvia's highest prize awarded in cinema.

== Synopsis ==
Loss is a story about a priest (Andrius Mamontovas) in Ireland who meets a woman Valda (Valda Bičkutė) from his native Lithuania only to find out her mysterious identity is closely connected with the darkest secret of his past.

Desperate for a better life Valda left Lithuania for Ireland, hoping to find a new purpose in life but failed to fulfill a promise to come back she made to her alleged son. Now a boy is adopted by Nora (Dalia Michelevičiūtė), a childless ex-wife of the desperate businessman Ben (Kostas Smoriginas) whose life is falling from his hands. Caught in a struggle with her husband's mistress Laima (Daiva Tamošiūnaitė-Budrė) she must fight not only for her company but also for the custody of a child who now is her only hope in life.

According to Variety magazine film critic Eddie Cockrell, the satisfying Lithuanian drama was inspired by Six Degrees of Separation and Dostoevsky’s line "the tears of that one tortured child". Loss delves into the harsh realities of six people's lives whose destinies are brought together after a tragic accident that happened over two decades ago.
