= The Apology (2022 film) =

- Film poster
- Directed by: Alison Star Locke
- Screenplay by: Alison Star Locke
- Produced by: Stacy Jorgensen; Lisa Whalen; Kim Sherman
- Starring: Anna Gunn; Linus Roache; Janeane Garofalo
- Cinematography: Jack Caswell
- Edited by: Lana Wolverton
- Music by: Uèle Lamore
- Production companies: SpectreVision; Company X
- Distributed by: RLJ Entertainment; Shudder; AMC+
- Release date: December 16, 2022 (Internet)
- Running time: 92 minutes
- Country: United States
- Language: English

The Apology is a 2022 American horror film written and directed by Alison Star Locke. It stars Anna Gunn, Linus Roache, and Janeane Garofalo.

== Plot ==
Twenty years after her daughter's mysterious disappearance, Darlene Hagen (Anna Gunn), a recovering alcoholic, is preparing to hold a family Christmas celebration with her best friend Gretchen (Janeane Garofalo). But her former brother-in-law Jack (Linus Roache) shows up for the dinner without warning and brings an unexpected and dangerous twist to the event—as he arrives not only with gifts but also with a terrible secret. Locked in the house by a heavy storm, they start a brutal game of revenge.

== Cast ==
- Anna Gunn as Darlene Hagen
- Linus Roache as Jack Kingsley
- Janeane Garofalo as Gretchen Sullivan
- Mary Leeholland as Sally Hagen
- Esmé McSherry as Young Sally
- Zena Leigh Logan as Reporter

== Reception ==
On the review aggregator website Rotten Tomatoes, 52% of 21 critics' reviews are positive, with an average rating of 6.0/10. Metacritic, which uses a weighted average, assigned the film a score of 46 out of 100, based on 7 critics, indicating "mixed or average" reviews.

Simon Abrams of Rogerebert.com gave the film three stars out of four and stated,

"The Apology" is a grim and mostly satisfying locked-room thriller about Darlene and Jack's complex and often unpleasant conversation. They both have things they feel compelled to say. Moreover, they both have something they need each other to do for their peace of mind. Nineteen years have passed since Darlene and Jack last spoke to each other, a long time to live in fear and misery, but maybe not enough to confer wisdom or perspective."

Jeannette Catsoulis of The New York Times wrote,

"A play-like trudge through seesawing power dynamics, bursts of violence, perpetual gloom and a ludicrously attenuated finale, "The Apology" could have doubled its tension by halving its running time. When the resolution of a movie depends in part on a fortuitously constipated dog, the only apology required is from whoever convinced you to watch in the first place."
