= The Housewife =

American biographical drama film

- Directed by: Ben Shirinian
- Screenplay by: Alyssa Hill
- Produced by: Robbie Brenner; Lee Broda; Jason De Beer; Kevin McKeon; Jonathan E. Lim; Matt Paul
- Starring: Naomi Watts; Tye Sheridan; Michael Imperioli; Luke Evans; Lena Olin; Debi Mazar
- Cinematography: Michael Merriman
- Edited by: Jon Devries
- Production companies: RBP; LB Entertainment; Escape Route Films; City Hill Arts; Sienna Film Foundation; Loose Cannon Pictures; Uncommon Studios; Neon
- Release date: September 10, 2026 (TIFF)
- Running time: 102 minutes
- Country: United States
- Language: English

The Housewife is a 2026 American biographical drama film directed by Ben Shirinian in his feature directorial debut, from a script by Alyssa Hill. It stars Naomi Watts, Tye Sheridan, Michael Imperioli, Luke Evans, Lena Olin and Debi Mazar.

It had its world premiere at the 2026 Toronto International Film Festival.

== Plot ==
A young New York Times journalist tracks down a potential Nazi officer living secretly in Queens, New York. But when he befriends the suspect's elegant and charming wife, the implications of his investigation become much more unsettling.

== Cast ==
- Naomi Watts as Hermine Braunsteiner, a former Nazi who was a vicious concentration camp guard
- Tye Sheridan as Joseph Lelyveld, a journalist for The New York Times
- Michael Imperioli as Anthony DeVito, an immigration agent
- Luke Evans as Russell Ryan, a former construction worker and Hermine's husband
- Lena Olin as Rachel Berger, a concentration camp survivor who attests to Hermine's war crimes
- Debi Mazar as a sickly neighbor of Hermine
- Hannah Marks as Carolyn

== Production ==
=== Development ===
The film was announced in February 2024, marking the feature-length directorial debut of Ben Shirinian. The screenplay was written by Alyssa Hill, who also serves as an executive producer. International sales are handled by Neon, with CAA Media Finance handling domestic sales.

=== Casting ===
Initial casting was announced in February 2024, with Naomi Watts, Tye Sheridan, Michael Imperioli and Norman Reedus attached to star.

Ahead of production, Luke Evans joined the film, replacing Reedus in his previously announced role.

Additional cast members include Debi Mazar, Hannah Marks, Bruce Altman and Lena Olin.

=== Filming ===
Principal photography was scheduled to begin in June 2024. Filming took place in Montreal in May 2025.

== Release ==
It had its world premiere at the 2026 Toronto International Film Festival on September 10, 2026.
