= Antitrust (film) =

2001 techno thriller film by Peter Howitt

- Theatrical release poster
- Directed by: Peter Howitt
- Written by: Howard Franklin
- Produced by: Nick Wechsler; Keith Addis; David Nicksay
- Starring: Ryan Phillippe; Rachael Leigh Cook; Claire Forlani; Tim Robbins
- Cinematography: John Bailey
- Edited by: Zach Staenberg
- Music by: Don Davis
- Production companies: Metro-Goldwyn-Mayer Pictures; Hyde Park Entertainment; Industry Entertainment
- Distributed by: MGM Distribution Co.
- Release date: January 12, 2001
- Running time: 109 minutes
- Country: United States
- Language: English
- Budget: $30 million
- Box office: $18.2 million

Antitrust (also titled Conspiracy.com and Startup) is a 2001 American techno-thriller film directed by Peter Howitt and written by Howard Franklin.

The film stars Ryan Phillippe, Rachael Leigh Cook, Claire Forlani and Tim Robbins. It portrays young idealistic programmers and a large corporation (NURV) that offers a significant salary, an informal working environment, and creative opportunities for those talented individuals willing to work for them. The charismatic CEO of NURV seems to be good-natured, but new employee Milo Hoffman begins to unravel the terrible hidden truth of NURV's operation.

Antitrust opened in the United States on January 12, 2001, to generally negative reviews from critics, and was a box office failure, grossing $18 million against a budget of $30 million.

== Plot ==
Working with his three friends at their new software development company Skullbocks, Stanford graduate Milo Hoffman is recruited by Gary Winston, the CEO of the software corporation NURV. Milo is offered an attractive programming position with a large paycheck, an almost-unrestrained working environment, and extensive creative control over his work. After accepting, Hoffman and his girlfriend, Alice Poulson, move to NURV headquarters in Portland, Oregon.

Despite development of the flagship product (Synapse, a worldwide media distribution network) being well on schedule, Hoffman soon becomes suspicious of the excellent quality source code that Winston personally provides to him, seemingly when needed most, while refusing to divulge the code's origin.

After his best friend and fellow computer programmer, Teddy Chin, is murdered, Hoffman discovers that NURV is stealing the code they need from programmers around the world—including Chin—and then killing them. NURV not only employs an extensive surveillance system to observe and steal code, the company has infiltrated the Justice Department and most mainstream media. Even Hoffman's girlfriend is a plant, an ex-con hired by the company to spy on and manipulate him.

In a secret NURV database of employee surveillance dossiers, Hoffman discovers highly-sensitive personal information about Lisa Calighan, a friendly co-worker. When he says he knows the company has this information about her, she agrees to help him expose NURV's crimes. Coordinating with Brian Bissel, Hoffman's old start-up friend, they plan to use a local public-access television station to hijack Synapse and globally broadcast their charges against NURV. However, Calighan is actually Winston's accomplice and foils Hoffman.

When the plan fails, and as Winston prepares to kill Hoffman, a backup plan is put into motion. Off-screen, Hoffman had previously confronted and convinced Poulson to turn against NURV; she, the fourth member of Skullbocks, and NURV's incorruptible security contractors usurp one of NURV's own work centers—"Building 21"—and transmit incriminating evidence with the Synapse code. Calighan, Winston, and his entourage are arrested by the FBI for their crimes. After amicably parting ways with the redeemed Poulson, Hoffman rejoins Skullbocks.

== Cast ==
- Ryan Phillippe as Milo Hoffman
- Claire Forlani as Alice Poulson/Rebecca Paul
- Rachael Leigh Cook as Lisa Calighan
- Tim Robbins as Gary Winston
- Douglas McFerran as Bob Shrot
- Richard Roundtree as Lyle Barton
- Tygh Runyan as Larry Banks
- Yee Jee Tso as Teddy Chin
- Nate Dushku as Brian Bissel
- Ned Bellamy as Phil Grimes
- Tyler Labine as Redmond Schmeichel
- Scott Bellis as Randy Sheringham
- David Lovgren as Danny Solskjær
- Zahf Hajee as Desi
- Jonathon Young as Stinky
- Rick Worthy as Shrot's Assistant
- Peter Howitt as Homeless man
- Gregor Trpin as Computer Guy

== Allusions ==
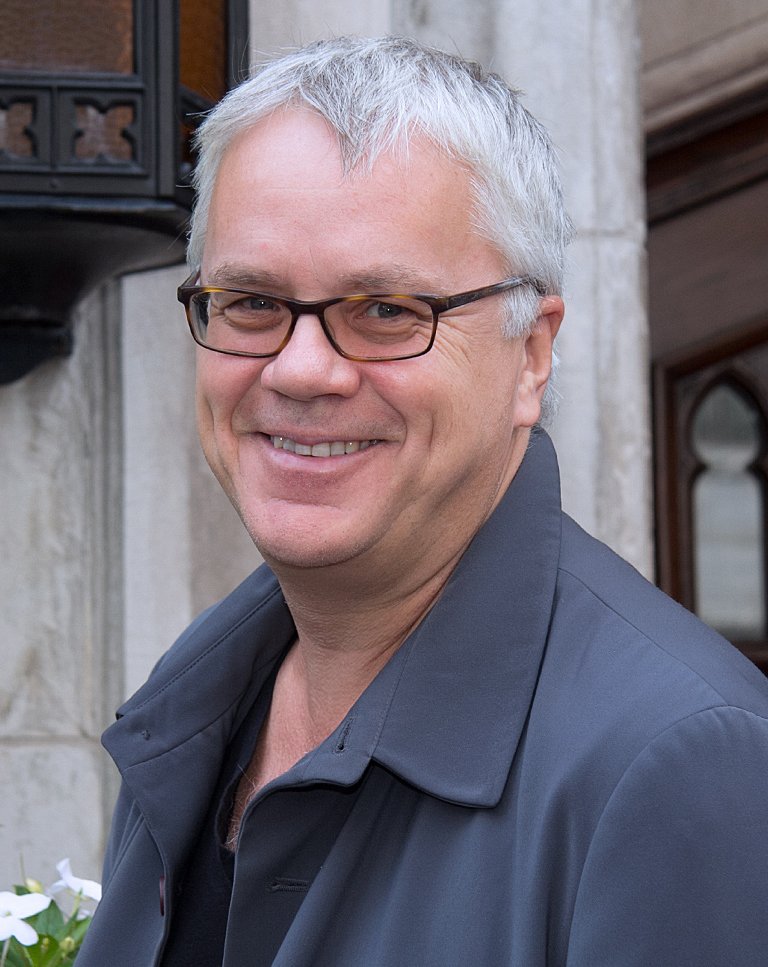
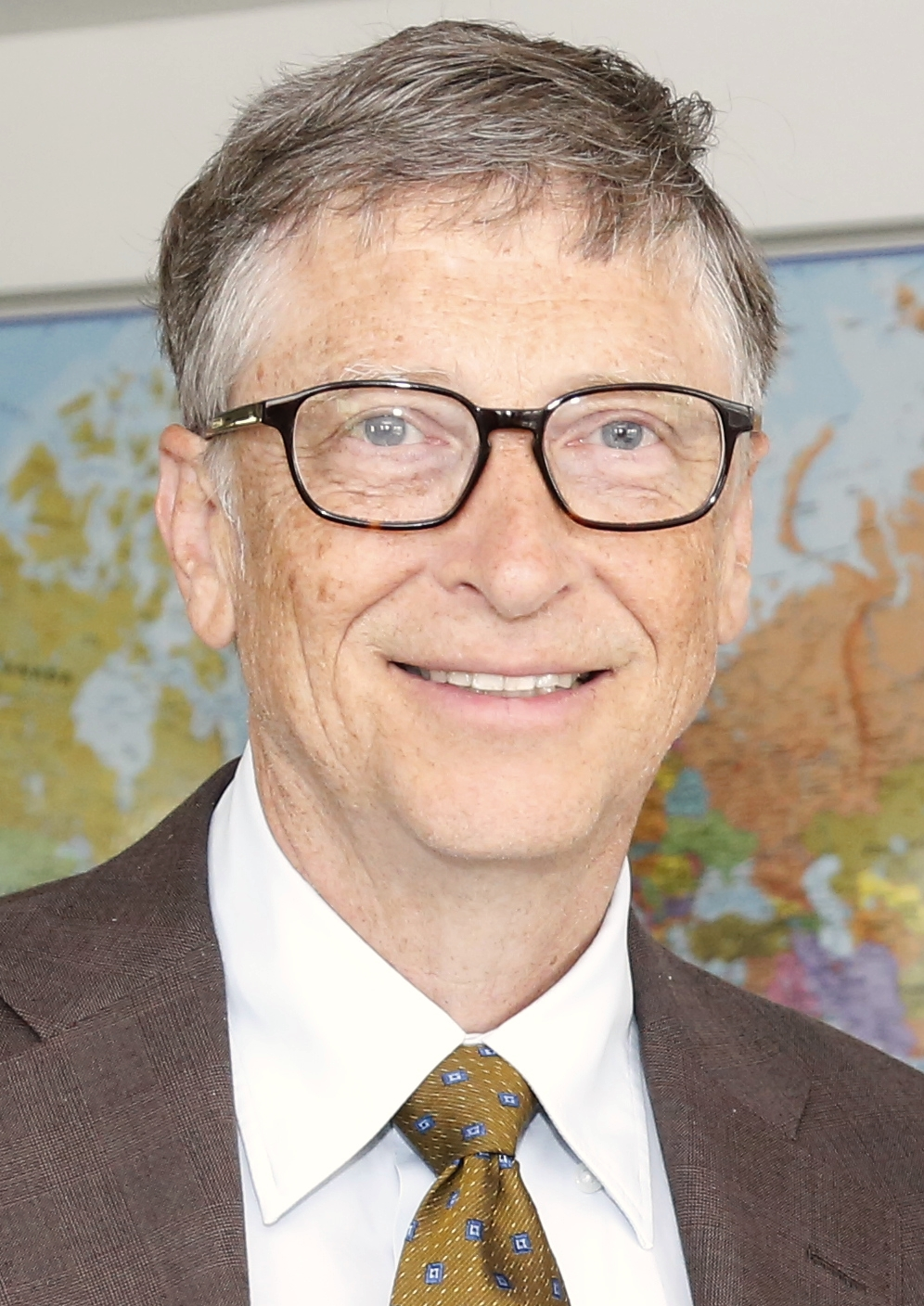
Tim Robbins's (left) character drew comparisons to Bill Gates (right).

Roger Ebert found Gary Winston to be a thinly disguised pastiche of entrepreneur Bill Gates; so much so that he was "surprised [the writers] didn't protect against libel by having the villain wear a name tag saying, 'Hi! I'm not Bill!'" Similarly, Ebert felt NURV "seems a whole lot like Microsoft". Parallels between the fictional and real-world software giants were also drawn by Lisa Bowman of ZDNet UK, James Berardinelli of ReelViews, and Rita Kempley of The Washington Post. Microsoft spokesman Jim Cullinan said, "From the trailers, we couldn't tell if the movie was about [America Online] or Oracle."

== Production ==
Principal photography for Antitrust took place in Vancouver, British Columbia, California, and Portland, Oregon.

Stanley Park in Vancouver served as the grounds for Gary Winston's house, although the gate house at its entrance was faux. The exterior of Winston's house itself was wholly computer-generated; only the paved walkway and body of water in the background are physically present in the park. For later shots of Winston and Hoffman walking along a beach near the house, the CG house was placed in the background of Bowen Island, the shooting location. Catherine Hardwicke designed the interior sets for Winston's house, which featured several different units, or "pods", e.g., personal, work, and recreation units. No scenes take place in any of the personal areas, however; only public areas made it to the screen. While the digital paintings in Winston's home were created with green screen technology, the concept was based on technology that was already available in the real world. The characters even refer to Bill Gates' house which, in real life, had such art. The paintings which appeared for Hoffman were of a cartoon character, "Alien Kitty", developed by Floyd Hughes specifically for the film.

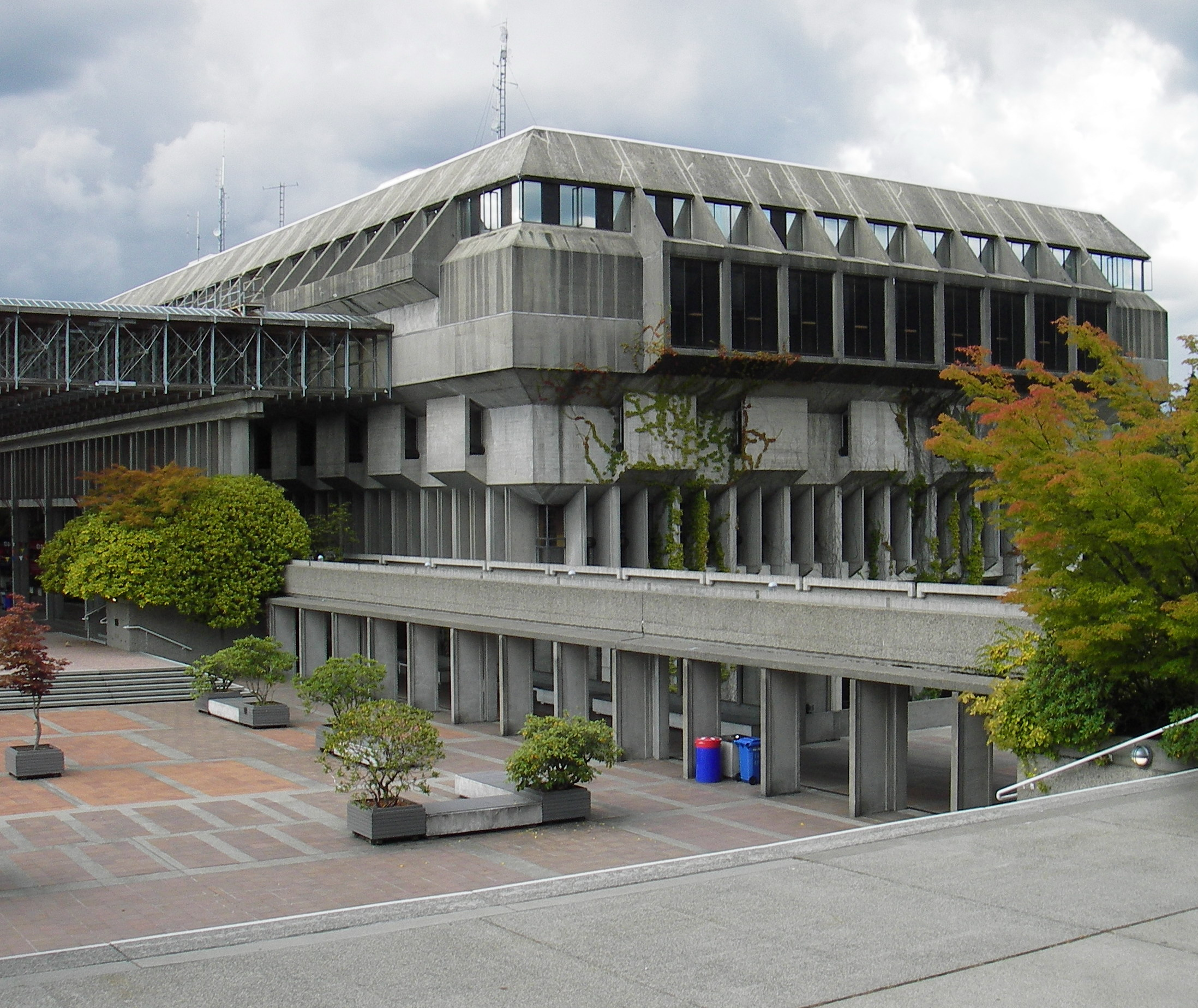
Simon Fraser University served as an outdoor shooting location for NURV headquarters.

Simon Fraser University's Burnaby campus stood in for external shots of NURV headquarters.

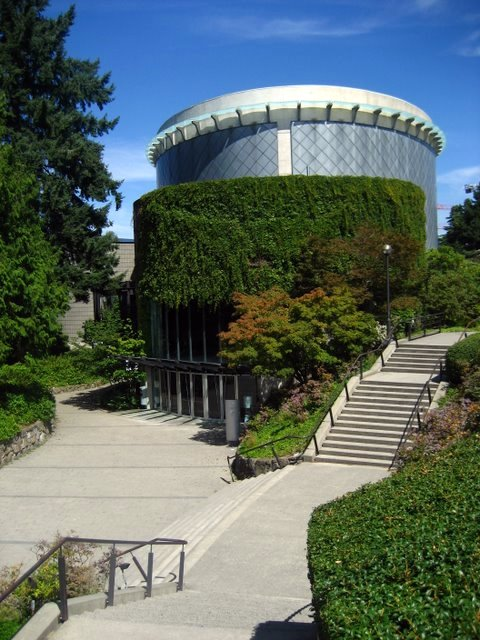
UBC's Chan Centre for the Performing Arts served as an indoor shooting location and inspiration for NURV headquarters' "The Egg".

The Chan Centre for the Performing Arts at the University of British Columbia (UBC) was used for several internal locations. The centre's foyer area became the NURV canteen; the set decoration for which was inspired by Apple's canteen, which the producers saw during a visit to their corporate headquarters. The inside of the Chan—used for concerts—served as the shape for "The Egg", or "The NURV Center", where Hoffman's cubicle is located. Described as "a big surfboard freak" by director Peter Howitt, production designer Catherine Hardwicke surrounded "The Egg" set with surfboards mounted to the walls; Howitt has said, "The idea was to make NURV a very cool looking place." Both sets for NURV's Building 21 were also on UBC's campus. The internal set was an art gallery on campus, while the exterior was built for the film on the university's grounds. According to Howitt, UBC students kept attempting to steal the Building 21 set pieces.

Hoffman and Poulson's new home—a real house in Vancouver—was a "very tight" shooting location and a very rigorous first week for shooting because, as opposed to a set, the crew could not move the walls. The painting in the living room is the product of a young Vancouver artist, and was purchased by Howitt as his first piece of art.

The new Skullbocks office was a real loft, also in Vancouver, on Beatty Street.

=== Open source ===
Antitrust's pro–open source story excited industry leaders and professionals, with the prospects of expanding the public's awareness and knowledge level of the availability of open-source software. The film heavily features Linux and its community, using screenshots of the Gnome desktop, consulting Linux professionals, and including cameos by Miguel de Icaza and Scott McNealy (the latter appearing in the film's trailers). Jon Hall, executive director of Linux International and consultant on the film, said "[Antitrust] is a way of bringing the concept of open source and the fact that there is an alternative to the general public, who often don't even know that there is one."

Despite the film's message about open source computing, MGM did not follow through with their marketing: the official website for Antitrust featured some videotaped interviews which were only available in Apple's proprietary QuickTime format.

== Reception ==
Antitrust received mainly negative reviews, and has a "Rotten" consensus of 23% on Rotten Tomatoes, based on 105 reviews, with an average score of 4 out of 10. The summary states "Due to its use of clichéd and ludicrous plot devices, this thriller is more predictable than suspenseful. Also, the acting is bad." The film also has a score of 31 out 100, based on 29 reviews, on Metacritic. Audiences polled by CinemaScore gave the film a grade "B+" on scale of A to F.

Roger Ebert of the Chicago Sun-Times gave the film two stars out of four. Linux.com appreciated the film's open-source message, but felt the film overall was lackluster, saying "'AntiTrust' is probably worth a $7.50 ticket on a night when you've got nothing else planned."

James Keith La Croix of Detroit's Metro Times gave the film four stars, impressed that "Antitrust is a thriller that actually thrills."

The film won both the Golden Goblet for Best Feature Film, and Best Director for Howitt, at the 2001 Shanghai International Film Festival.

== Home media ==
Antitrust was released as a "Special Edition" DVD on May 15, 2001, and on VHS on December 26, 2001. The DVD features audio commentary by the director and editor, an exclusive documentary, deleted scenes and alternative opening and closing sequences with director's commentary, Everclear's music video for "When It All Goes Wrong Again" (which is played over the beginning of the closing credits), and the original theatrical trailer. The DVD was re-released August 1, 2006. It was released on Blu-ray Disc on September 22, 2015.

== See also ==
- List of films featuring surveillance
- The Circle (2017 film) – 2017 American film by James Ponsoldt
- Hackers (film) – 1995 film by Iain Softley
