= 2009 Shanghai International Film Festival =

Chinese film festival

The 2009 Shanghai International Film Festival is the 12th such festival devoted to international cinema to be held in Shanghai, China. It was held from June 13-21, 2009.

== Jury ==
This year's jury members are:

- Danny Boyle (UK, head of jury)
- Xavier Koller (Switzerland)
- Jianxin Huang (China)
- Komaki Kurihara (Japan)
- Andy Lau (Hong Kong)
- Andie MacDowell (USA)
- Jung-Wan Oh (South Korea)

== Awards ==
=== Golden Goblet ===
- Golden Goblet for Best Film
  - Original, directed by Alexander Brøndsted, Antonio Tublen
- Golden Goblet for Best Actor
  - Sverrir Gudnason for Original
- Golden Goblet for Best Actress
  - Simone Tang for Kærestesorger
- Best Director
  - Julius Ševčík for Normal
- Best Cinematography
  - Nicolas Guicheteau Hans Meier for Nulle part terre promise
- Contribution to Cinema
  - Priyanka Chopra

=== Asian New Talent Award ===
- Best Director
  - Ye Zhao for Zha lai nuo er
- Audience Award
  - Ye Zhao for Zha lai nuo er
