= Transference (video game) =

2018 psychological thriller adventure video game

- Developers: SpectreVision; Ubisoft Montreal
- Publisher: Ubisoft
- Director: Benoit Richer
- Producer: Kevin Racapé
- Designer: Julien Dastous
- Programmer: Thomas Tu
- Artist: Christian Bedard
- Writers: Kyle McCullough; Daniel Noah
- Composer: Kreng
- Platforms: Microsoft Windows; PlayStation 4; Xbox One
- Release: WW: September 18, 2018
- Genre: Adventure
- Mode: Single-player

Transference is a psychological thriller adventure video game developed by SpectreVision and Ubisoft Montreal and published by Ubisoft for Microsoft Windows, PlayStation 4, Xbox One. It was released on September 18, 2018.

== Plot and gameplay ==
Transference is about a family struggling with some serious issues. It is set inside a corrupted simulation made by a brilliant but "troubled" scientist named Raymond (Macon Blair). From the perspective of different family members, the simulation is constructed from the "brain data" of Raymond, his wife Katherine (Lindsay Burdge), and their young son Benjamin (Tyler Crumley). Together, they move through their home, discover their secrets and collect the evidence that they need to repair their lives.

== Reception ==
While the game received positive reviews, both Charlie Hall writing for Polygon and Alessandro Barbosa writing for GameSpot noted that the game's themes, centered around domestic violence, made for a disturbing, uncomfortable experience. They also both criticised the bleak, unsatisfying ending.

=== Awards ===
Transference was nominated for "Best VR Game" at the Golden Joystick Awards, and for "Immersive Reality Game of the Year" at the 22nd Annual D.I.C.E. Awards.
