= 2013 Shanghai International Film Festival =

Chinese film festival

- Location: Shanghai, China
- Awards: Golden Goblet
- No. of films: more than 200
- Website: http://www.siff.com

Shanghai International Film Festival chronology
- 2014 2012

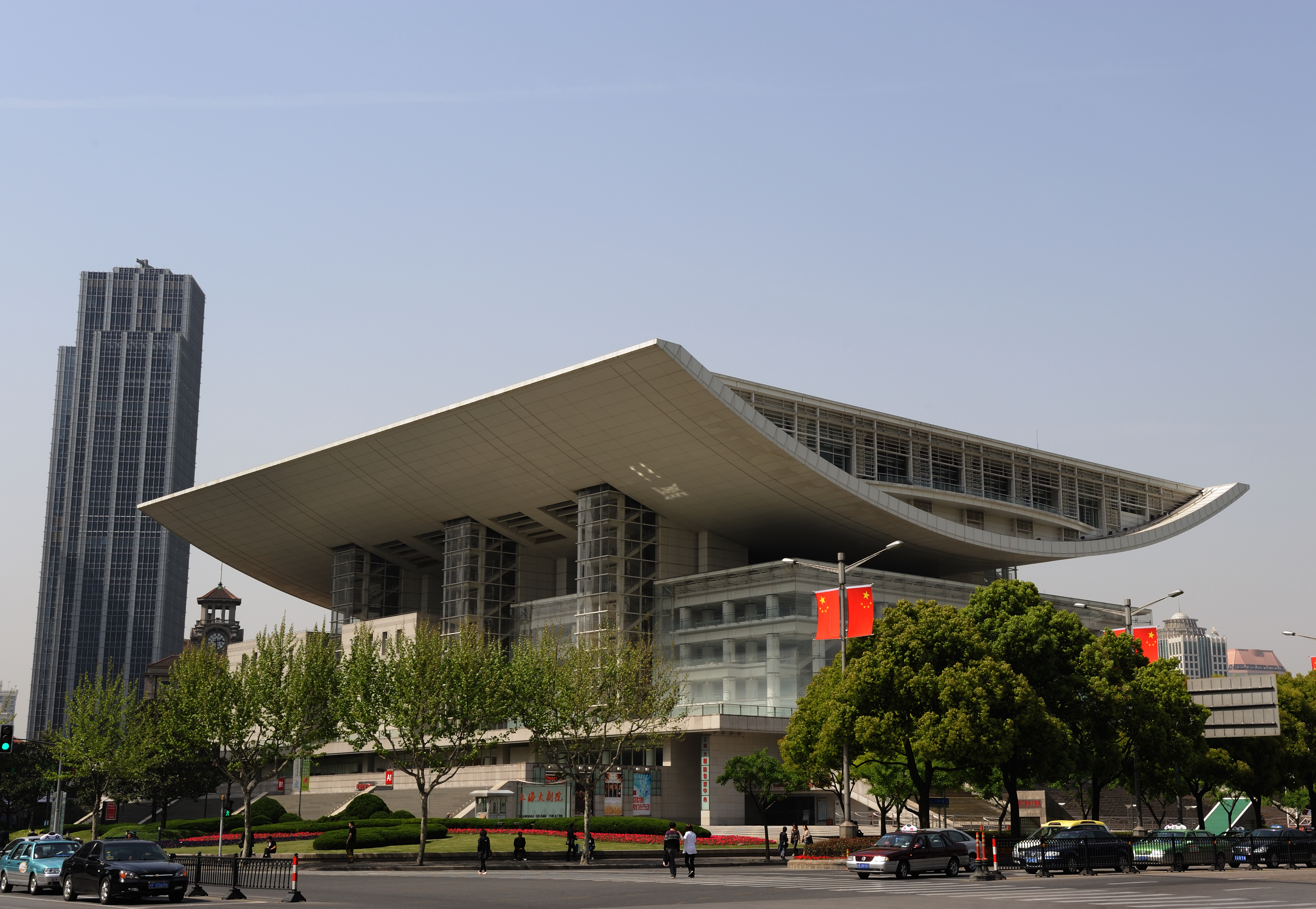
Shanghai Grand Theater

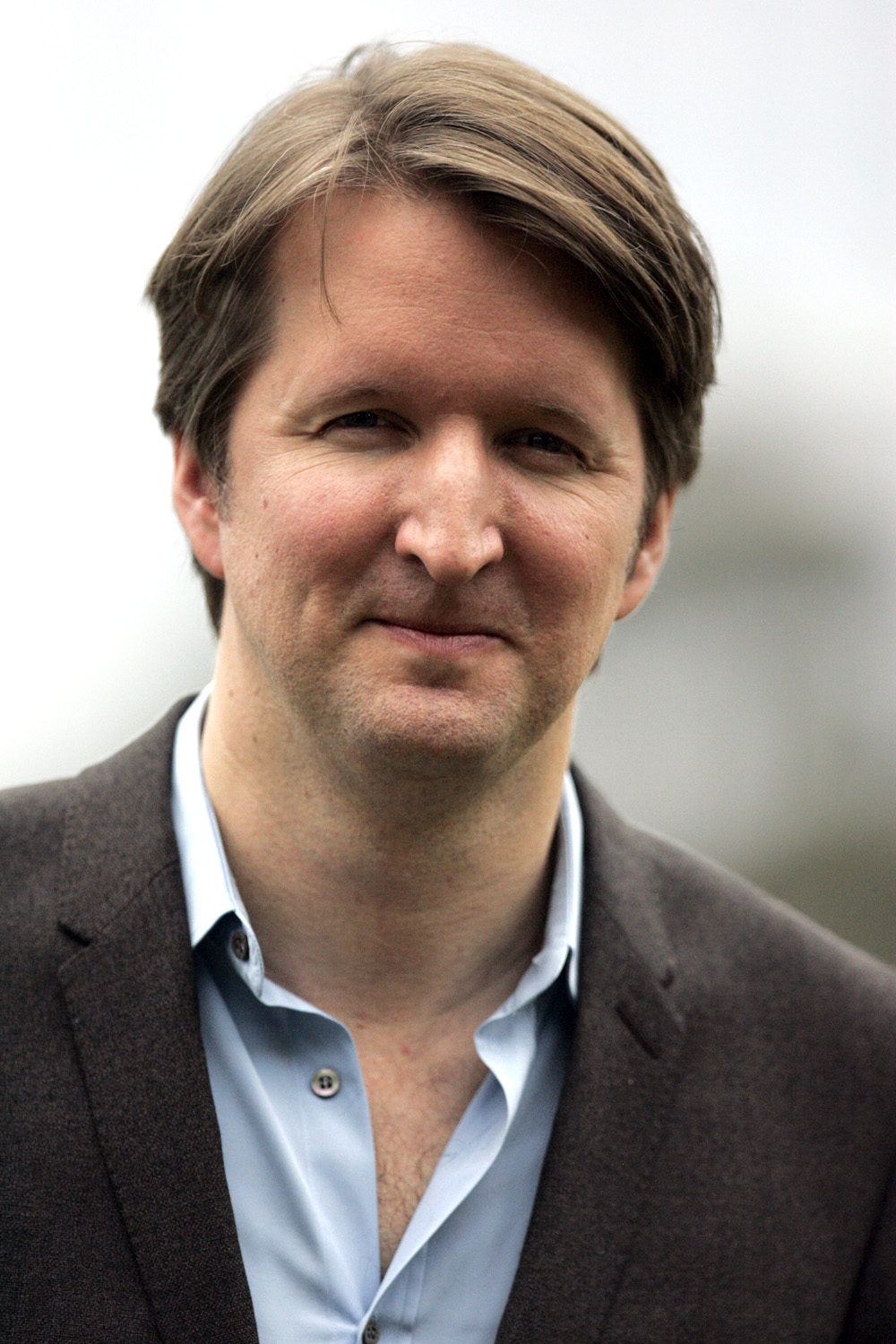
Tom Hooper, president of the jury for the Golden Goblet Award

The 2013 Shanghai International Film Festival was the 16th such festival devoted to international cinema held in Shanghai, China.

== International Jury ==
The members of the jury for the Golden Goblet Award were:

- Tom Hooper (UK; president of the jury)
- Michel Ciment (French critic)
- Chris Kraus (German director)
- Khosro Masoumi (Iranian director)
- Jiří Menzel (Czech director, theater director and actor)
- Ning Hao (Chinese director)
- Yu Nan (Chinese actress)

== Winners ==
- Best Feature Film: The Major, by Yury Bykov (Russia)
- Jury Grand Prix: Reliance "Förtroligheten", by William Olsson (Sweden)
- Best Director: Yury Bykov for The Major
- Best Actress: Crystal Lee in Unbeatable (China) directed by Dante Lam
- Best Actor: Nick Cheung in Unbeatable (China) directed by Dante Lam
- Best Screenplay: Angus MacLachlan for Reliance (Sweden) directed by William Olsson
- Best Cinematography: Vachan Sharma/Paul Blomgren Dovan for Reliance (Sweden) directed by William Olsson
- Best Music: Yury Bykov for The Major (Russia) directed by Yury Bykov
