= Objecto Quasi =

First edition (publ. Moraes)

Objecto Quasi is a Portuguese collection of short stories by author José Saramago published in 1978.

It was translated to English in 2012 under the title The Lives of Things

In 2010, a cinema adaptation of one of its stories was released under the name Embargo. In "The Chair", a dictator's seat is slowly being eroded until he collapses on the floor – a clear reference to the fall of Salazar, the Portuguese dictator. In the stories, men and things form the world, whose dynamics are shaken by distance or disunity.
