= Out of Paradise (film) =

2018 Swiss-Mongolian film by Chogsom

Out of Paradise is a 2018 Swiss-Mongolian drama film directed and written by Batbayar Chogsom. It portrays a traditional Mongolian couple and their struggle to get a professional C-section and secure delivery of their first child. The film can be considered a road movie because the couple travels from their home in the Mongolian Steppe to Mongolia's capital city Ulaanbaatar, where they face challenges. The film won the Golden Goblet Award for Best Feature Film at the 21st Shanghai International Film Festival.

== Synopsis ==
Married couple Dorj and Suren lead a peaceful life as nomads in the Mongolian steppe. Suren is pregnant and they are anxious about their first child. Suddenly, their lives change as a local doctor advises them to travel to Ulaanbaatar because he finds evidence that the unborn child and the mother are in severe danger. After two miscarriages they want to avoid risk and so their trip to Ulaanbaatar begins.

Neither Dorj nor Suren know how to drive a car, so Ganbaa, a young man, takes them in his truck. The situation between the three gets more and more difficult day by day and finally, Dorj and Ganbaa end up fighting because Ganbaa can't keep his distance from the beautiful Suren.

Finally, the couple arrives in Ulaanbaatar, but they cannot afford the hospital. Dorj decides to sell Suren's golden earrings, his wedding gift. Stressed out by this situation, he loses one earring and does not get enough money for the other. He starts drinking in a hotel bar. There he meets Saraa, a prostitute, who starts to flirt with him. He tells her his story and she pities him. She tells him about a karaoke contest that night, where he could win much money. Dorj wins the money and spends the night with Saraa.

In the morning hours, Saraa gets a call from her pimp, Jack. He wants the money that she was supposed to earn that night. Threatened by Jack, Saraa steals Dorj's wallet and hands it over to Jack. But the wallet is empty because Dorj hid the money. Jack decides to kidnap Dorj and take his money. In a dramatic fight, Dorj wins against Jack and his hit-men. Jack dies in that fight.

The next morning Dorj arrives at the hospital where Suren is still waiting for the C-section. He pays the fee, but Suren confronts him with the second ring that was found on the floor. She asks him where he got the money and they have a terrible argument. We see Dorj leaving the hospital and they seem to go their separate ways.

After Suren gives birth, she is taken back to the steppe in a shared taxi. Suddenly, she spots Dorj standing at a crossroad waiting...

== Cast ==
Dorj	Bayarsaikhan Bayartsengel
Suren	Enerel Tumen
Jack	Adiyabaatar Rina
Saraa	Erdenetsetseg Tsend-Ayush
Mutter	Oyun-Erdene Jamiyan
Ganbaa	Bayanmunkh Purevjav

== Production ==
=== Development ===
Out of Paradise is the first feature film made by Swiss-Mongolian filmmaker Batbayar Chogsom. Chogsom was born and raised in Ulaanbaatar and is well acquainted with Mongolian traditions. He migrated to Switzerland to study Popular Cultures, Cultural and Social Anthropology and Political Sciences. He entered the film business. The idea for this story came from his experience of becoming a father in 2009.

=== Filming ===
After the first journey to Mongolia to find a location and the cast a teaser was produced. A second trip to Mongolia was necessary and the teaser was finished in 2015. The same year a major production company agreed to support the film, along with other donors. Chogsom and his crew returned to Mongolia in 2016 to shoot the remaining scenes. the film was released in 2018.

== Reception ==
Although the film was not popular in Switzerland, it was the most successful Swiss production in 2018. No other Swiss film won a comparable prize within the competition of an international festival that year. The last Swiss film awarded "Best Film" by the jury of a A Class Festival dates back to 1995. The jury of the 21st Shanghai Film Festival called the film "plain but not simple, honest and poetic." Unfortunately, Out of Paradise has not been shown in Mongolian cinemas or festivals yet, but the film has had screenings in Asia, Europe and in the US and has had good coverage within major Swiss newspapers.

== Awards ==
Out of Paradise won the Golden Goblet in the category Best Feature Film at 21st Shanghai Film Festival 2018.
