= Embargo (film) =

- Directed by: António Ferreira
- Written by: José Saramago (Novel); Tiago Sousa (Screenplay)
- Produced by: Tathiani Sacilotto; António Ferreira
- Starring: Filipe Costa; Cláudia Carvalho; Pedro Diogo; Fernando Taborda; José Raposo
- Music by: Luís Pedro Madeira
- Release date: September 30, 2010
- Running time: 83 minutes
- Country: Portugal
- Language: Portuguese

Embargo is a 2010 film that is an adaptation of a tale included in the 1978 Quasi Object by the Portuguese writer José Saramago.

== Plot ==
Nuno is a man working at a hot dog stand, who also invented the machine which promises to revolutionize the shoe industry- a foot scanner. In the middle of a gasoline embargo and finding himself in a strange predicament, Nuno becomes mysteriously confined to his car, finding his life suddenly embargoed
