= Golden Goblet Award for Outstanding Artistic Achievement =

Chinese film award

The Golden Goblet Outstanding Artistic Achievement (Chinese: 金爵奖最佳艺术贡献奖) is a special jury prize awarded to films in the main category of competition at the Shanghai International Film Festival.

== Award winners ==
Year	Film	Country
2013	The Major	(Russia) Yuri Bykov
2014	Begin Again	(United Kingdom) Gregg Alexander
2015	The Shameless	(South Korea) OH Seung-uk
2016	HAZE	(Philippines) Ralston Jover
2017	Fault Condition	(Romania)
2018	Carnivores	(France) (Belgium)
2019	Trees Under the Sun	(India) Dr. Biju
