= Mitsuhiro Mihara =

Japanese film director

Mihara Mitsuhiro (三原光尋; born 1964 in Kyoto, Japan) is a Japanese film director.

== Filmography ==
- 真夏のビタミン (Manatsu no bitamin; lit. "Midsummer Vitamin") (1994)
- 風の王国 (Kaze no oukoku; lit. "Kingdom of the Wind") (1995)
- 燃えよピンポン (Legend of Blood, Sweat & Tears) (1999)
- 絵里に首ったけ (Amen, Somen and Rugger Men!) (2000)
- あしたはきっと・・・ (Ashita wa kitto...) (2001)
- ドッジGoGo! (Dojji GoGo!) (2002)
- Village Photobook (2004)
- スキトモ (Sukitomo) (2007)
- 歌謡曲だよ、人生は (Kayōkyoku dayo jinsei wa; lit. "Tokyo Rhapsody") (2007) - Anthology film, co-directed with Itsumichi Isomura, Shinobu Yaguchi, Yoshikazu Ebisu and Toshiyuki Mizutani.
- しあわせのかおり (Flavor of Happiness) (2008)
- A Life with My Alzheimer's Husband (2023)
- Takano Tofu (2023)
