= 2004 Shanghai International Film Festival =

Chinese film festival

The 2004 Shanghai International Film Festival (SIFF) was the 7th SIFF to be held.

== Jury members ==
- Ding Yinnan (China)
- Park Chul-soo (Korea)
- David Caesar (Australia)
- Kazuo Kuroki (Japan)
- Manfred Wong (HK, China)
- Olivier Assayas (France)
- Ron Henderson (USA)

== Winners ==
- Best Feature Film: Tradition Of Lover Killing, director Khosro Masumi (Iran)
- Jury Grand Prix: Jasmine Women (China)
- Best Director: Lee Je-yong, Untold Scandal (Korea)
- Best Actress: Gu Meihua, Shanghai Story (China)
- Best Actor: Andreas Wilson, Evil (Sweden)
- Best Screenplay: Esa ILLI, Brother (Finland)
- Best Cinematography: Marita HALLFORS/ Pekka UOTILA, Brothers / Peter MOKROSINSKI, Evil (Sweden) (ex aequo)
- Best Music: Lee Byeong-woo, Untold Scandal (Korea)
