= Ikíngut =

İkingut
- Directed by: Gísli Snær Erlingsson
- Written by: Jon Steinar Ragnarsson
- Starring: Hjalti Rúnar Jónsson, Hans Tittus, Nakinge, Pálmi Gestsson
- Release date: 2000
- Running time: 90 min
- Countries: Iceland, Denmark, Norway
- Languages: Icelandic, Greenlandic

Ikíngut is a movie that was released in 2000.

The word means "Friend" in the native language and it is also a name given to children.

== Synopsis ==
The film tells an extraordinary story of friendship. In the 19th century, a small Eskimo boy living in Greenland reaches a remote village in Iceland on a broken iceberg. He meets a young boy named Buas, who is from a family in the village, and, by chance, saves him from the falling avalanche. The two kids become friends. People of the village, however, are superstitious; they believe that the awkward-looking Ikingut (named after the first word he uses) is an evil spirit. Therefore, Buas has to fight for his friend against those who want him to be imprisoned or even killed.
