= 2012 Shanghai International Film Festival =

Chinese film festival

- Location: Shanghai, China
- Awards: Golden Goblet
- No. of films: more than 200
- Website: http://www.siff.com

Shanghai International Film Festival chronology
- 2013 2011

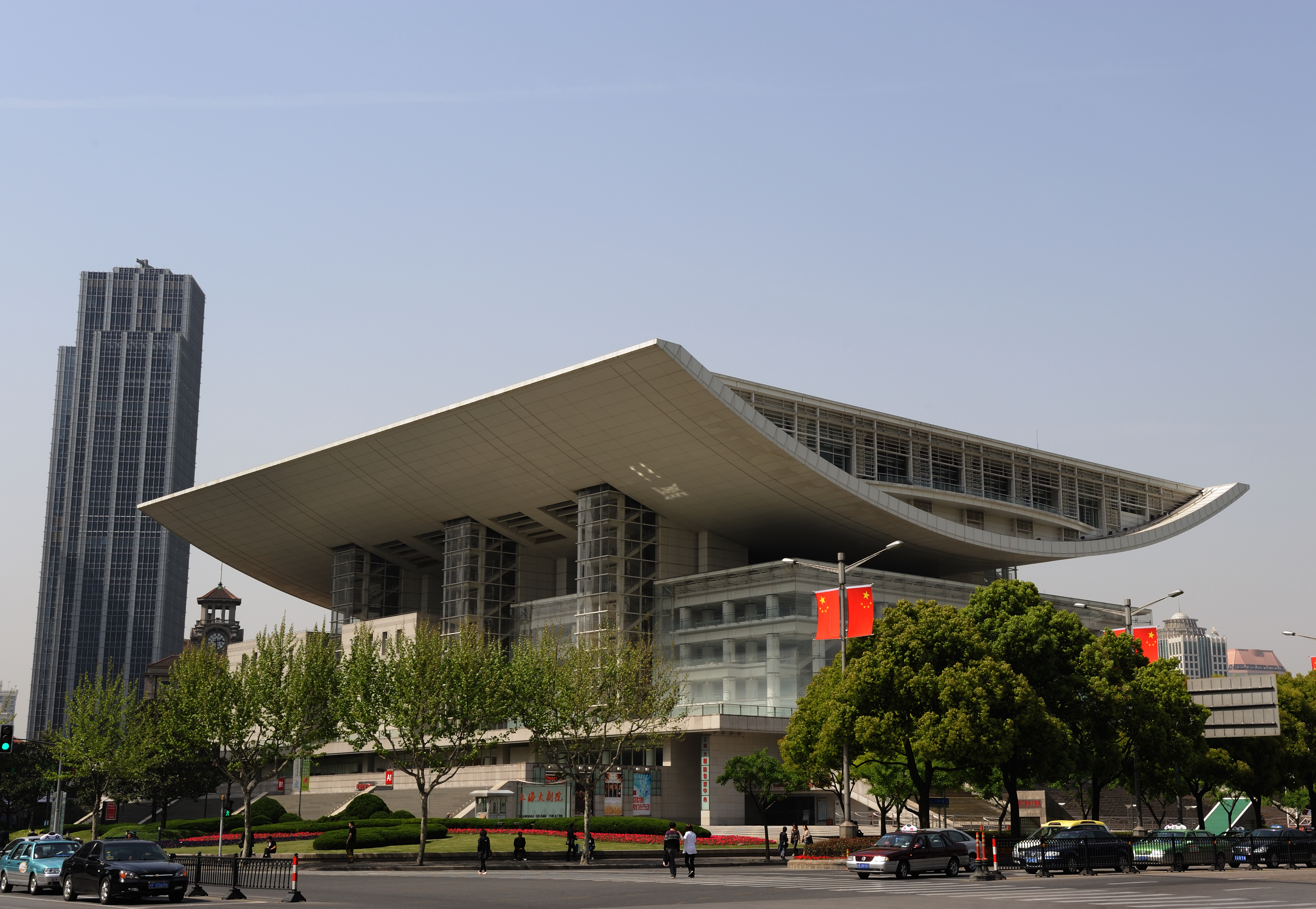
Shanghai Grand Theater

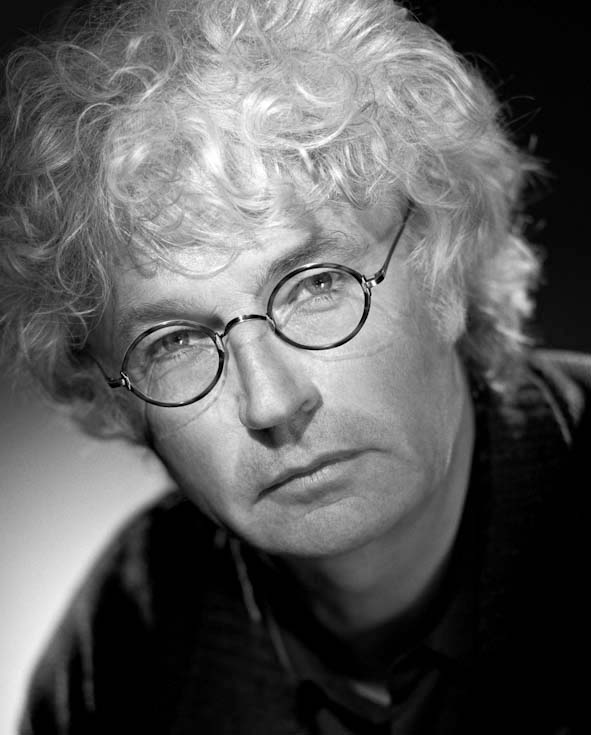
Jean-Jacques Annaud, president of the jury for the Golden Goblet Award

The 2012 Shanghai International Film Festival was the 15th such festival devoted to international cinema held in Shanghai, China.

== International Jury ==
The members of the jury for the Golden Goblet Award were:

- Jean-Jacques Annaud (France; president of the jury)
- Rakhshan Banietemad (Iran)
- Terence Chang (USA)
- Heather Graham (USA)
- Li Bingbing (China)
- György Pálfi (Hungary)
- Zhang Yang (China)

== Winners ==
- Best Feature Film: The Bear, by Khosrow Masoumi (Iran)
- Jury Grand Prix: For the Love of God, by Micheline Lanctôt (Canada)
- Best Director: Gao Qunshu, Detective Hunter Zhang (China)
- Best Actress: Ursula Pruneda, The Dream of Lu (Mexico)
- Best Actor: Vladas Bagdonas, The Conductor (Russia)
- Best Screenplay: Kenji Uchida, Key of Life (Japan)
- Best Cinematography: Shi Luan, Falling Flowers (China)
- Best Music: Avshalom Caspi, Chrysalis (Spain)
