= Age Out =

2018 crime drama film directed by A. J. Edwards

- Directed by: A.J. Edwards
- Written by: A.J. Edwards
- Produced by: Tyler Glodt; Nicolas Gonda; Christian Sosa
- Starring: Tye Sheridan; Imogen Poots
- Cinematography: Jeff Bierman
- Edited by: Christopher Branca; Sam Butler
- Music by: Colin Stetson
- Production companies: OnBuzz; Posada Pictures
- Distributed by: Gravitas Ventures
- Release dates: March 11, 2018 (South by Southwest); November 22, 2019 (United States)
- Running time: 91 minutes
- Country: United States
- Language: English

Age Out (formerly titled Friday's Child) is a 2018 American crime drama film directed by A. J. Edwards and starring Tye Sheridan and Imogen Poots. Gus Van Sant served as an executive producer of the film.

== Cast ==
- Tye Sheridan as Richie
- Imogen Poots as Joan
- Caleb Landry Jones as Swim
- Jeffrey Wright as Detective Portnoy
- Brett Butler as Ms. LaField
