= Ben Shirinian =

Canadian filmmaker

Shirinian in 2026

Ben Shirinian is a Canadian filmmaker, whose feature directorial debut The Housewife is slated to premiere in 2026.

Originally from Montreal, Quebec, he began his career as an actor, most notably in a small role as the young version of Myron Hatch in the 1993 film The Neighbor, before studying filmmaking at Queen's University. He is currently based in Toronto, Ontario, where he has directed music videos and advertising for the Lookout production studio.

He was previously best known for a series of short dance films created in collaboration with National Ballet of Canada dancer and choreographer Guillaume Côté, including Lost in Motion (2012), Lost in Motion 2 (2013), Lulu (2020) and Faun (2021). He was also involved in the creation of multimedia video projections for some of Côté's dance works, including Alcina, Into the Fade and Grand Mirage.

His first narrative short film, the Holocaust story Josef and Aimée, entered production in 2010, and was released in 2014.

The Housewife is slated to premiere in the Special Presentations program at the 2026 Toronto International Film Festival.
