= António Ferreira (filmmaker) =

Portuguese film director and producer

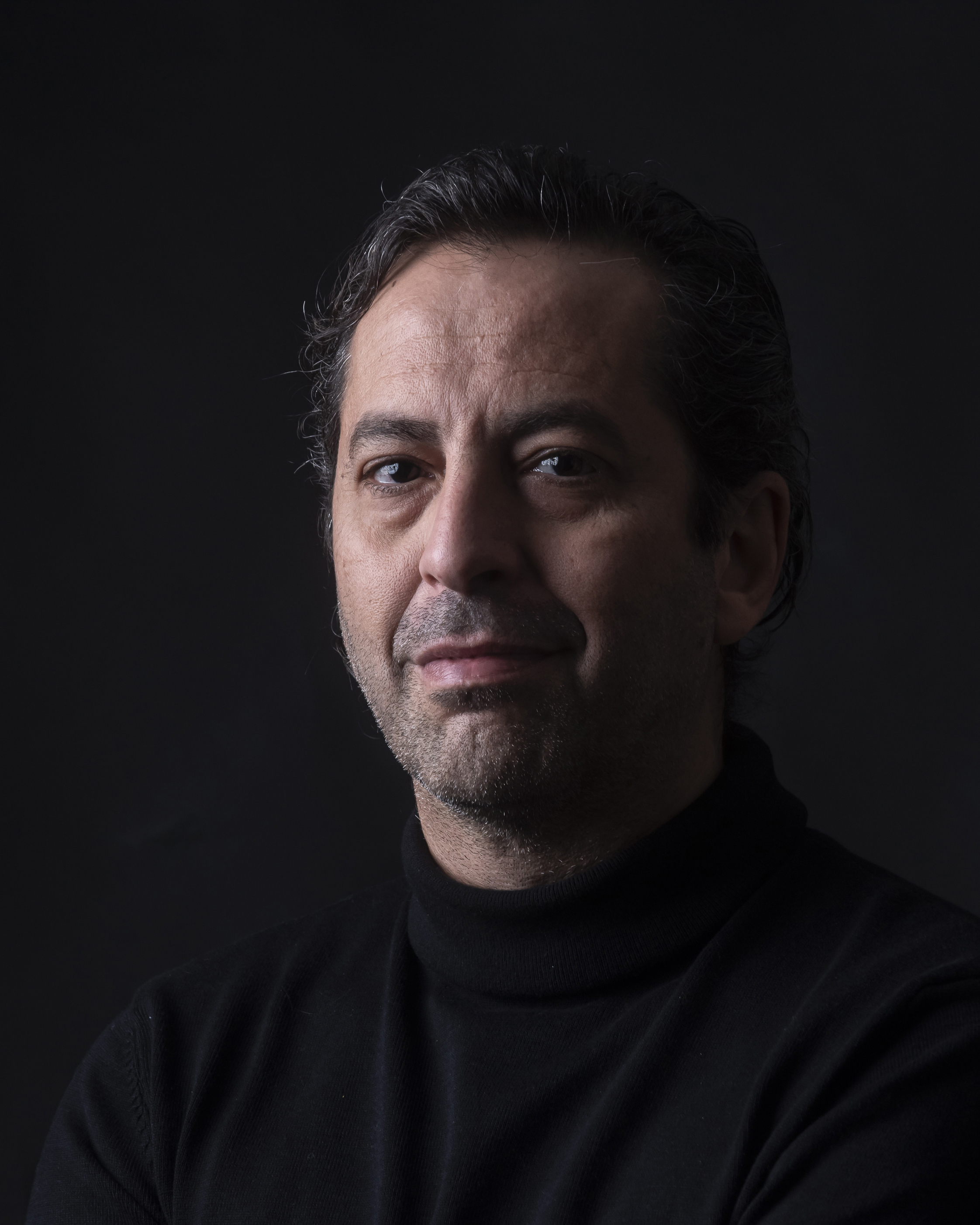
António Ferreira

António Ferreira (born 1970) is a Portuguese film director and producer. His nickname is "Toneca."

== Biography ==
Ferreira was born in Coimbra, Portugal in 1970, where he lived most of his life. In 1991 he moved to Paris, returning one year later to the military service. After a short career as a computer programmer, in 1994 he entered film school in Lisbon (estc). In 1996 he moved to Berlin to study in the Film Academy of Berlin (dffb). In 1999 he shot his first film Breathing (under water), which was acclaimed by the critics and won several international prizes. In 2002 came his first feature film - Forget everything I've told you, which became one of the most successful films in Portugal that year. Currently he lives in Coimbra.

== Filmography ==
- The Scent of Things Remembered (2025)
- A Bela América (2023)
- Pedro e Inês (2018)
- Posfácio nas Confecções Canhão (short) (2012)
- Embargo (2010)
- Deus Não Quis (2007)
- Humanos - A vida em Variações (documentary) (2006)
- Esquece Tudo o Que Disse (2002)
- Respirar - Debaixo D'Água (2000)
- WC (1997)
- Gel Fatal (1996)
