= Original (film) =

- Directed by: Alexander Brøndsted; Antonio Tublen
- Written by: Alexander Brøndsted; Antonio Tublen
- Cinematography: Linus Eklund
- Edited by: Bodil Kjærhauge
- Music by: Antonio Tublen
- Production companies: Film i Skåne; Film i Väst; Harmonica Films; Nobody Features; PingPongFilm; Trollhättan Film AB; Zentropa Entertainments
- Distributed by: Nordisk Film
- Release date: 2009
- Running time: 104 minutes
- Countries: Spain; Sweden
- Languages: Swedish; Danish; English

Original is a 2009 film directed by Antonio Tublén and Alexander Brøndsted. It won the Golden Goblet for best film at Shanghai International Film Festival. The jury was led by Danny Boyle and included Andie MacDowell, Michelle Yeoh, Huang Jianxin, Xavier Koller, Komaki Kurihara, Andrew Lau and OH Jungwan.

== Cast ==
- Sverrir Gudnason - Henry
- Tuva Novotny - Marie
- David Dencik - Jon
- Dejan Čukić - Max
- Ghita Nørby - Harriet
- Charlotte Fich - Dr Helm
- Jesper Christensen - Bruno
- Magnus Krepper - Berd
- Thomas Bo Larsen - Pedro
- Helle Fagralid - Young Harriet
- Eric Ericson - Bank Chef
- Therese Glahn - Desk clerk
- Saga Gärde - Ebba
- Patrik Karlson - Hockey trainer
- Michalis Koutsogiannakis - Dr Alberto
