= Antonio Tublén =

Swedish film director and author

- Occupation(s): Film director, screenwriter, composer, author
- Years active: 2004–present
- Known for: Original, LFO

Antonio Tublén is a Swedish film director, screenwriter, composer, and author.

== Career ==
Tublén began his career with short films: Hollywood (2004), Havanna (2005), and The Amazing Death of Mrs Müller (2006), co-directed with Alexander Brøndsted. His feature debut, Original (2009), co-directed with Brøndsted and produced by Lars Von Triers company Zentropa, won the Golden Goblet for Best Film at the Shanghai International Film Festival with jury chairman Danny Boyle .

He followed with LFO (2013), which premiered at Fantastic Fest. The film was produced by Pingpongfilm and SpectreVision with Elijah Wood. It sold to Netflix worldwide.

In 2017, he directed the psychological thriller Robin, followed by the English-language horror-comedy Zoo (2018) starring Ed Speelers and Zoë Tapper. Released by Seville International and eOne. Got picked up by HBO/MAX.

In 2025, Tublén debuted as a novelist with the psychological thriller Antagonisten, published by Bokfabriken; the novel received positive reviews in the Swedish press.

== Filmography ==
- Original (2009) – Writer, Director
- LFO (2013) – Writer, Director
- Zoo (2018) – Writer, Director

== Reception ==
Original was praised for its Nordic tone and influences from directors such as Roy Andersson and Aki Kaurismäki.

Writing for fantasticfest.com, Todd Brown called LFO “a clever, totally lo-fi science fiction dramedy” that “delights in a good idea executed well,” praising Tublén’s dry wit and the ensemble performances.

The Hollywood Reporter praised the film’s character focus in its Torino review.

Geekscape highlighted its mood and humor, calling it a “dark, moody, and sometimes hilarious sci-fi drama.”

ScreenAnarchy praised its use of sound and sinister wit, comparing it to Berberian Sound Studio.

According to Rotten Tomatoes, LFO holds a 100% approval rating score.

The Danish Film Institute described Tublén and Brøndsted’s filmmaking philosophy as “making films without asking permission,” noting how LFO was shot in just 10 days on a budget of 1 million SEK.

== Bibliography ==
- Antagonisten (Bokfabriken, 2025) – psychological thriller; novel debut.
