= Shanghai International Film Festival =

Annual film festival held in China

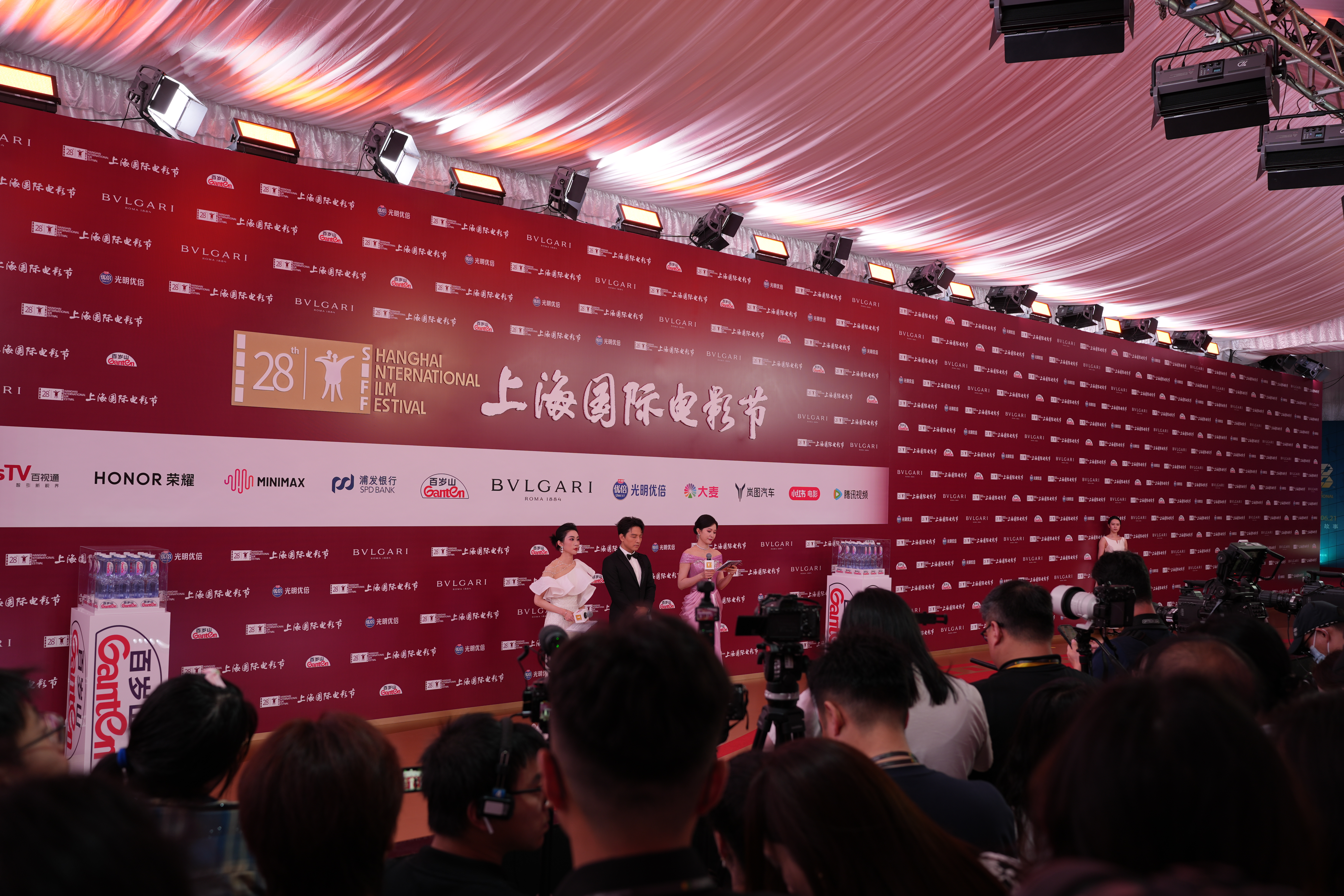
- 2026 Shanghai International Film Festival closing ceremony red carpet
- Location: Shanghai, China
- Founded: 1993
- Most recent: 2026
- Awards: Golden Goblet
- Hosted by: China Film Administration, China Media Group, Shanghai Government
- Website: www.siff.com

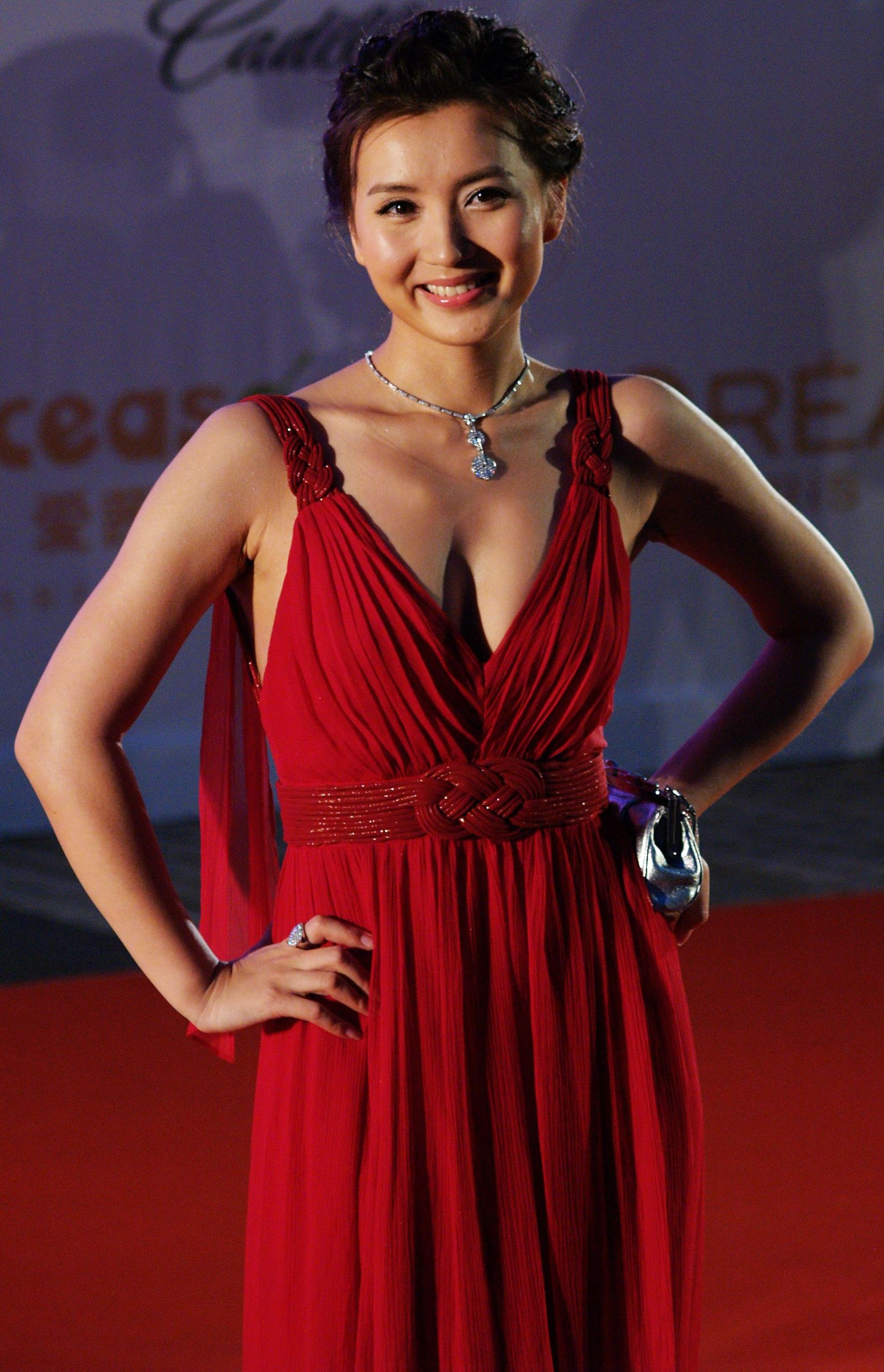
Chen Hao at the 2007 festival

The Shanghai International Film Festival (SIFF, Chinese: 上海国际电影节, French: Festival international du film de Shanghai) is the largest film festival in Asia and China's longest-running international cinema event. The first festival was established in October 1993. It is the only Chinese festival accredited by the FIAPF.

The festival is held over a ten-day period every June. SIFF is organized by China Film Administration, China Media Group, and the Shanghai government. It awards several "Golden Goblet" Awards (Chinese: 金爵; pinyin: Jīn Jué) for best film, best director, best actor/actress, and other categories, as well as a "Special Jury Award". SIFF Mart consists of the Film Market, China Film Pitch and Catch (CFPC), and Co-production Film Pitch and Catch (Co-FPC). The SIFFORUM is a communication platform.

== History ==
In 2011, SIFF started a "Film Restoration" program to repair and preserve prints of classic Chinese movies.

Notable jury members include Oliver Stone, Mark Rydell, István Szabó, Stanislav Rostotsky, Alan Parker, Lee Chang-Dong, Geoffrey Gilmore, François Girard, Olivier Assayas, Luc Besson, Lisa Lu, Donnie Yen, Chen Hao, Tran Anh Hung, Chen Kaige, He Ping, Wong Kar-Wai, Bille August, Danny Boyle, Andie Macdowell, John Woo, Barry Levinson, Paz Vega, Jean-Jacques Annaud, Heather Graham, Li Bingbing, Tom Hooper, Gong Li, Sally Potter, Emir Kusturica, Atom Egoyan, Xu Qing, Sabu, Ildikó Enyedi, Nuri Bilge Ceylan, Zhao Tao, Paolo Genovese, Nicolas Celis, Aleksei Alekseivich German, Wang Jingchun, Zhou Xun and Tony Leung Ka-fai.

Other notable attendees include Jesse Eisenberg, Smriti Irani, Kirill Razlogov, Peng Yuyan, Xu Qing, Zhou Yun, Yang Zishan, Thierry Fremaux, Xu Zheng and Amanda Seyfried.

== Festival programme ==
=== Competition sections ===
Competition sections for Golden Goblet Award have four categories, which include main competition for feature-length films, as well as competitions specialized in Asia new talent, documentaries, animation, and short films. They bring together over 2,000 films from more than 100 countries and regions worldwide every year.

=== International Panorama ===
Every June, SIFF will show over 400 films from around the world in about 40 cinemas covering every district of Shanghai. The programme includes thematic curation, but also selects the best of today's world cinema, and presents them from the perspectives of theme, region etc.

- Tribute To Masters (showing films of crucial figures from history of cinema)
- SIFF Classics (aims to screen the classics around the world and films of latest restorations)
- SIFF Specials (responds to the crucial themes and moments of human history)
- Refreshing Chinese Cinema (covers the best recent Chinese films)
- Gala Screenings (hosts glamorous film premiere events)
- Viva La Festival (collects iconic pieces of the year)
- Global Village (shows the latest films around the world and more...)

=== SIFForum ===
A communication platform for industry executives, tech innovators and film talents take part in conversations to discuss the state of the film industry and film as an art form.

=== Siff Project ===
Launched in 2007, SIFFProject is a program meant to foster Chinese and Sino-foreign productions with potential partners and investors. The main categories include:

- Genre: This programme is designed to foster Chinese genre projects, including but not limited to comedy, romance, sci-fi, suspense, etc.
- New Talent: Support emerging Chinese directors for their first fictional feature project.
- Co-production: Facilitate feature film projects that have the potential of a Sino-foreign co-production.
- Pre-production: Selects feature film projects which have a relatively mature director in place or have been fully developed.
- Work in Progress (WIP): For projects that have started shooting or are currently in post-production

== Awards ==
=== Golden Goblet Awards ===
Golden Goblet Award fall into four categories, which include main competition for feature-length films, as well as competitions specialized in asia new talent, documentary, animation and short films. They bring together over 2,000 films from more than 100 countries and regions around the world every year.

==== Main Competition ====
The most prestigious award given out at Shanghai is the Jin Jue ("Golden Goblet") for the Best Feature Film.

- Best Feature Film (presented to the producer)
- Jury Grand Prix
- Best Actress (presented to the leading actress)
- Best Actor (presented to the leading actor)
- Best Director
- Best Screenplay
- Best Cinematography (presented to the DOP)
- Outstanding Artistic Achievement (music, artistic directing, costume, editing, make-up, etc.)

==== Documentary Competition ====
- Best Documentary Film (presented to the director)

==== Animation Competition ====
- Best Animation Film (presented to the director)

==== Asian New Talent Award ====
An award launched in 2004 aimed at gathering new forces in film creativity, excavating/tapping fresh young faces on screens, and boosting newly made productions by young film makers into worldwide perspective.

- Best Film (A film which is one of the first two long fiction films directed by a director of Asian nationality or Asian origin.)
- Best Director (A Director of Asian nationality, the competition film directed by whom is one of his/her first two long fiction films.)
- Best Actor (An Actor of Asian nationality, whose competition film is one of the first two long fiction films in which he plays starring role.)
- Best Actress (An Actress of Asian nationality, whose competition film is one of the first two long fiction films in which she plays starring role.)
- Best Scriptwriter (A Script Writer of Asian nationality, the competition film written by whom is one of his/her first two long fiction films.)
- Best Cinematographer (A Cinematographer of Asian nationality, the competition film shot by whom is one of his/her first two long fiction films.)

==== Short Film Competitions ====
A short film is defined as an original motion picture that has a running time of 40 minutes or less, including all credits.This excludes from consideration such works as: 1. Previews and advertising films. 2. Sequences from feature-length films, such as credit sequences. 3. Unaired episodes of established TV series. 4. Unsold TV series pilots.

- Best Live Action Short Film (presented to the director)
- Best Animated Short Film (presented to the director)

=== China Movie Channel Media Awards ===
China Movie Channel Media Awards are presented at each Shanghai International Film Festival by China Movie Channel since 2007. Voted by the reporters in the entertainment industry, the awards are aimed at "promoting medium-and-small-budget homegrown movies and exposing talented young directors and actors".

- Most Attractive Film
- Most Attractive Screenwriter
- Most Attractive Director
- Most Attractive Leading Actor
- Most Attractive Leading Actress
- Most Attractive Supporting Actor
- Most Attractive supporting Actress
- Most Attractive New Director
- Most Attractive New Actor
- Most Attractive New Actress

=== Jackie Chan Action Movie Awards ===
Jackie Chan Action Movie Awards were presented during the Jackie Chan Action Movie Week during the SIFF between 2015 and 2018. Voted by the reporters in the entertainment industry, the awards are aimed at "celebrating international action movies and honoring those who have made outstanding contributions to the genre." In 2019, these awards became their own event held separately from the SIFF.

- Best Action Movie
- Best Action Movie Director
- Best Action Choreographer
- Best Action Movie Actor
- Best Action Movie Actress
- Best Action Movie New Performer
- Best Special Effects
- Best Fight

== See also ==
- Cinema of China
- Film festivals
- List of film festivals in China
