= Pilar del Río =

Spanish journalist, writer and translator

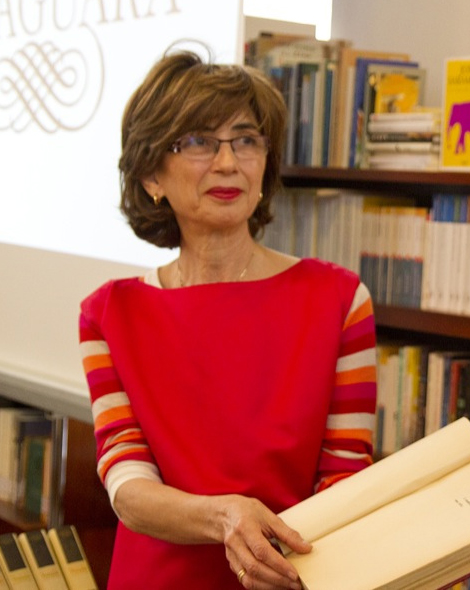
- del Río at the José Saramago Foundation library, in Lanzarote, Canary Islands
- Born: March 15, 1950 (age 76); Castril, Spain
- Spouse: José Saramago (1988–2010, his death)
- Website: www.josesaramago.org

María del Pilar del Río Sánchez (born March 15, 1950) is a Spanish journalist, writer and translator. She is the president of José Saramago Foundation.

== Biography ==
Pilar del Río was born in Castril (Granada) in 1950, to Antonio and Carmen, the eldest of fifteen children. She worked as a journalist at TVE and Sevilla's Canal Sur.

In 1986, del Río met the Portuguese writer José Saramago after she read all of his books that were translated into Spanish. They got married two years later, in 1988, and decided to live in Lisbon, moving afterwards in 1993 to Lanzarote, one of the Spanish Canary Islands. She lived with José Saramago until his death, in 2010, also translating many of Saramago's works into Spanish. In 2010, after her husband's death, del Río acquired Portuguese citizenship.

Pilar del Río is president of the José Saramago Foundation. On May 26, 2017 she was awarded the Luso-Spanish Arts and Culture Prize at the National Library of Spain.

=== Works ===
- Los andaluces (written with Juan Teba). Barcelona: Editorial Epidauro, 1979. ISBN 84-85309-06-5

==== Translations ====
Books by José Saramago which Del Río translated into Spanish:

- Todos os Nomes (Todos los nombres). Madrid: Santillana, 2001. ISBN 84-204-4295-X
- A Caverna (La caverna). Madrid: Santillana, 2001. ISBN 84-204-4228-3
- A Maior Flor do Mundo (La flor más grande del mundo). Madrid: Alfaguara, 2001 ISBN 978-84-204-4354-6
- O Homem Duplicado (El hombre duplicado). Madrid: Alfaguara, 2002. ISBN 958-704-049-X
- O Conto da Ilha Desconhecida (El cuento de la isla desconocida). Madrid: Suma de Letras, 2002. ISBN 84-663-0459-2
- Ensaio sobre a Lucidez (Ensayo sobre la lucidez). Madrid : Santillana, 2004. ISBN 84-95964-08-2
- As Intermitências da Morte (Las intermitencias de la muerte). Madrid: Alfaguara, 2005. ISBN 84-204-6945-9
- As Pequenas Memórias (Las pequeñas memorias). Madrid: Alfaguara, 2007. ISBN 978-84-204-7129-7
- A Viagem do Elefante (El viaje del elefante). Madrid: Santillana, 2010. ISBN 978-84-204-0742-5
- Caim (Caín). Madrid: Punto de Lectura, 2011. ISBN 978-84-663-2459-5
- Claraboia (Claraboya), (written in 1952). Madrid: Alfaguara, 2011. ISBN 978-84-204-1109-5
- Alabardas (Alabardas), (unfinished). Madrid: Alfaguara, 2014. ISBN 978-84-204-1600-7

== See also ==
- José and Pilar, a 2010 documentary about her and Saramago.
