= The Story of a Shipwrecked Sailor =

Work of non-fiction by Gabriel García Márquez

- Author: Gabriel García Márquez
- Publication date: 1955

The Story of a Shipwrecked Sailor (original Spanish-language title: Relato de un náufrago) is a work of non-fiction by Colombian writer Gabriel García Márquez. The full title is The Story of a Shipwrecked Sailor: Who Drifted on a Liferaft for Ten Days Without Food or Water, Was Proclaimed a National Hero, Kissed by Beauty Queens, Made Rich Through Publicity, and Then Spurned by the Government and Forgotten for All Time (Spanish: Relato de un náufrago que estuvo diez días a la deriva en una balsa sin comer ni beber, que fue proclamado héroe de la patria, besado por las reinas de la belleza y hecho rico por la publicidad, y luego aborrecido por el gobierno y olvidado para siempre).

It was originally published as a fourteen consecutive day series of installments in El Espectador newspaper in 1955; it was later published as a book in 1970, and then translated into English by Randolph Hogan in 1986. The story is written in the first-person from the perspective of the sailor, 20-year-old Luis Alejandro Velasco, and was in fact signed by Velasco as author when it was first published in 1955. Not until 1970 when it was published as a book was García Márquez's name first publicly associated with the story.

Nobel Prize in Literature laureate Gabriel García Márquez began his literary career as a newspaper writer. In 1955, he wrote a series of newspaper stories about a shipwrecked sailor who nearly died on account of negligence by the Colombian Navy; several of his colleagues drowned shortly before arriving at the port of Cartagena de Indias due to the existence of overweight contraband aboard the vessel. This resulted in public controversy, as it discredited the official account of the events, which had blamed a non-existent storm for the shipwreck and glorified the surviving sailor. As García Márquez subsequently became a sort of persona non grata for the government of General Gustavo Rojas Pinilla, he then worked for several years as a foreign correspondent.

The book's theme is the possible, but not necessary, moral reversion to a primitive, instinctual existence in the face of a sea catastrophe and consequent shipwreck and solitude. This theme had been explored previously in fiction by Daniel Defoe (Robinson Crusoe and the robinsonade genre) and Voltaire (Candide), and more recently by William Golding (Lord of the Flies and Pincher Martin), Umberto Eco (The Island of the Day Before), J. M. Coetzee (Foe), José Saramago (The Stone Raft and The Tale of the Unknown Island). A later non-fiction treatment of a similar theme can be found in The Last Strange Voyage of Donald Crowhurst by Ron Hall and Nicolas Tomalin.

== The story ==
In February 1955, seaman Luis Alejandro Velasco of the destroyer Caldas is eager to return to Colombia after a long stay in the United States. When the ship sets sail, however, it is overloaded — in part with contraband. When the vessel is caught in heavy waves in the Caribbean, eight of the crew are washed overboard, together with much of the cargo. After four days the search ends, with the missing declared dead. However, Velasco found a raft and remained on the open sea without food and without hope. After drifting with sea currents for ten days, he arrives with his raft on a coast that he later discovers to be Colombia. He is received first with affection and later with military honors and much money from publicity agencies.

== Subject's later life ==
Luis Alejandro Velasco Rodríguez left the Navy and began to work in the private sector, starting with a job in a bus company. He eventually settled into work as a commercial agent in an insurance company in Bogotá. When Gabriel García Márquez published the story fifteen years later — in 1970 — in the book Relato de un Náufrago, he generously ceded the author's rights and royalties to Velasco. In 1983, Velasco sued for translation rights to the book and lost. In the last week of his life, he apologized to García Márquez for the lawsuit. He died in Bogotá on August 2, 2000, aged 66.
