= Note =

Note, notes, or NOTE may refer to:

== Music and entertainment ==
- Musical note, a pitched sound (or a symbol for a sound) in music
- Notes (album), a 1987 album by Paul Bley and Paul Motian
- Notes, a common (yet unofficial) shortened version of the title of the American TV situation comedy, Notes from the Underbelly
- Notes (film), a short by John McPhail
- Notes (journal), the quarterly journal of the Music Library Association

== Finance ==
- Banknote, a form of cash currency, also known as bill in the United States and Canada
- Promissory note, a contract binding one party to pay money to a second party
- Note, a security (finance), a type of bond

== Technology and science ==
- IBM Notes (formerly Lotus Notes), a client-server, collaborative application owned by IBM Software Group
- Microsoft OneNote, a note-taking application bundled with Office
- Natural orifice transluminal endoscopic surgery (NOTES), a type of minimally invasive surgery
- NOTE (tag), a tag used in computer programming
- Notes, another name for the Japanese video game company Type-Moon
- Notes (Apple), a note-taking application bundled with macOS and iOS
- Redmi Note, a series of mobile phones
- Samsung Galaxy Note series, an Android phablet

== Writing, texts, and documents ==
- A diplomatic note, or letter of protest, a highly formal diplomatic document
- Note (typography), a commentary or reference appended to a text
- Note-taking, a recording of information
- Note verbale, a diplomatic letter or document, also known as Third Person Note or Third Party Note
- Suicide note

== Others ==
- National Organisation for Tobacco Eradication (India), a campaigning organisation
- Note (perfumery), a scent experienced as a perfume fades
- Nissan Note, a mini MPV produced by Nissan

== See also ==
- Liner notes
- Notation (disambiguation)
- Note 2 (disambiguation)
- The Note (disambiguation)
- Help:Footnotes
