= The Note =

The Note may refer to:

== Music ==
- "The Note", a song by Man Overboard from Heavy Love
- The Note (album), a 2005 Bane album
- "The Note" (song), a 1985 song from Daryle Singletary's album Ain't It the Truth

== Television and film ==
- The Note (ABC News), a summary and analysis of political news stories by ABCNews.com
- "The Note" (Dynasty), a fourth-season episode of American television drama series Dynasty
- The Note (film), a 2007 TV movie shown on Hallmark Channel
- "The Note" (Seinfeld), a third-season episode of the American television comedy series Seinfeld

== Other uses ==
- The Note (video game), a 1997 video game released for the PlayStation
- The Note (magazine), an Australian music and cultural magazine based in Adelaide, South Australia

== See also ==
- Note (disambiguation)
- The Notes, a 1976 novel by José Saramago
