= José and Pilar =

- Cinematic release poster
- Directed by: Miguel Gonçalves Mendes
- Produced by: Miguel Gonçalves Mendes; Ana Jordão; Daniela Siragusa
- Starring: José Saramago; Pilar del Río; Gael García Bernal; Fernando Meirelles
- Cinematography: Daniel Neves
- Edited by: Cláudia Rita Oliveira
- Music by: Adriana Calcanhotto; Bruno Palazzo; Camané; Luís Cila; Noiserv; Pedro Granato; Pedro Gonçalves
- Production companies: JumpCut; O2; El Deseo
- Distributed by: JumpCut
- Release dates: 25 September 2010 (Brazil); 18 November 2010 (Portugal)
- Running time: 117 minutes
- Country: Portugal
- Language: Portuguese

José and Pilar (José e Pilar) is a Portuguese documentary directed by Miguel Gonçalves Mendes following the last years of the Nobel Prize winner José Saramago, chiefly through his relationship with his devoted wife, Pilar del Río. Highly praised by the critics and the audience, the film succeeds in portraying the tenderness, the genuine integrity and the deep humanity between the controversial writer and his wife. It gathers sequences from Madrid to Helsinki to Rio de Janeiro. It includes sequences life in Lanzarote, and during trips around the world (presenting José's books, signing autographs, making speeches) as well as their simple, transient and quotidian moments during the period José writes his "The Elephant's Journey". The film was produced by Miguel Mendes' JumpCut (Portugal), Fernando Meirelles's O2 and Pedro Almodóvar's El Deseo.

== Plot ==
"The Elephant's Journey", in which Saramago narrates the adventures and antics of an elephant transported from the court of King John III of Portugal to that of the Austrian Archduke Maximillian, is the starting point of José and Pilar.

The film shows us their daily life in Lanzarote and their trips around the globe, and is a surprising portrayal of an author throughout the creative process of a couple who decide to change the world, or at least to make it a better place. The film shows us an unknown Saramago, unravels any preconceived ideas we may have about the man and demonstrates that genius and simplicity can indeed be compatible. José and Pilar is a glimpse into one of the greatest creators of the Twentieth Century and shows us that, as Saramago said, "everything can be told in a different way."

== Cast ==
- José Saramago, writer (Nobel Prize winner in Literary, 1998).
- Pilar del Río, journalist.
- Gael García Bernal, actor.
- Fernando Meirelles, filmmaker.

== Accomplishments and nominations ==
- Opened the Ronda International Political Cinema Film Festival, introduced by the judge Baltasar Garzón.
- Shown at the Guadalajara International Film Festival, one of the most prestigious film festivals in Latin America (out of competition).
- Winner of the Audience Award in the São Paulo Film Festival.
- Nominated by the Portuguese Authors Society for Best Film (2011).
- Best Film of the year by Visão and top 5 Best Films by Time Out Portugal.
- Nominated for Best Film, Best Editing and Best Soundtrack by the Brazilian Academy of Cinema.
- Portuguese submission for a nomination for the Academy Award for Best Foreign Film.

== See also ==
- List of submissions to the 84th Academy Awards for Best Foreign Language Film
- List of Portuguese submissions for the Academy Award for Best Foreign Language Film
