= Death with Interruptions =

1995 novel by José Saramago

Death with Interruptions (Death at Intervals)
- First edition (Portuguese)
- Author: José Saramago
- Original title: As Intermitências da Morte
- Translator: Margaret Jull Costa
- Language: Portuguese
- Genre: Philosophical novel
- Publisher: Harcourt
- Publication date: 2005
- Publication place: Portugal
- English publication date: 2008
- Media type: Print: hardback
- Pages: 256 pp. (hardcover edition); 238 pp. (paperback edition)
- ISBN: 0-15-101274-1
- OCLC: 1424861216
- Dewey Decimal: 869.342
- LC Class: PQ9281.A66 I6813
- Preceded by: Seeing
- Followed by: Memories of My Youth

Death with Interruptions, published in Britain as Death at Intervals (Portuguese: As Intermitências da Morte, lit. 'The Intermittencies of Death'), is a novel written by Nobel Laureate José Saramago. Death with Interruptions was published in 2005 in its original Portuguese, and the novel was translated into English by Margaret Jull Costa in 2008. The novel focuses on death, as both a phenomenon and as an anthropomorphized character. A key of the book is how society relates to death in both of these forms, and likewise, how death relates to the people she is meant to kill.

== Plot summary ==
The book, set in an unnamed, landlocked country at a point in the unspecified past, opens with the end of death. Mysteriously, at the stroke of midnight on January 1, no one in the country experiences death any more. Initially, the people of this country celebrate their apparent victory over mankind's longtime foe. Though the traditional sources for guidance on things like life and death endeavor to discover why people have stopped dying, religious authorities, philosophers, and scholars alike can find no answers. The Catholic Church feels threatened by this new turn of events, as the end of death would call into question one of the fundamental foundations of their dogma: the death and resurrection of Jesus Christ. On the other hand, common citizens generally enjoy their newfound immortality.

However, this joy is short-lived — it soon becomes apparent that the end of death presents unique demographic and financial challenges. The complete cessation of dying leads to a growing fear among healthcare workers that the system will collapse under its own weight: generations of incapacitated, but still living, people will populate care homes and hospitals for, presumably, all eternity. Funeral directors, on the other hand, fear the opposite problem: they will have no business, and will be forced to move to preparing animals for the afterlife.

A means of finally killing people, and relieving families of the burden of their catatonic kin, is devised and implemented by an underground group known only as the maphia (the 'ph' is chosen to avoid any confusion with the more sinister Mafia). The incapacitated are brought over the borders of the unnamed country, where they instantly die, as death has not ceased working elsewhere on the globe. The industry develops so quickly that the government itself becomes beholden to the maphioso, even bringing it to the brink of war with its neighbors.

Death reemerges not long thereafter, this time as a woman named death (the lowercase name is used to signify the difference between the death that ends life, and the Death who will end all of the Universe). She announces, through a missive sent to the media, that her experiment has ended, and people will begin dying again. However, in an effort to kill more kindly, death will now send a letter to those about to perish, giving them a week to prepare for their demise. The violet-envelope-encased letters create a frenzy in the country, as people are not just returned to dying, but also must face the specter of receiving one of these letters and having their fate sealed with it.

From here, the story largely focuses on death's relationship with an otherwise unremarkable cellist who, amazingly, will not die. Every time death sends him his letter, it gets returned. Death discovers that, without reason, this man has mistakenly not been killed. Although originally intending merely to analyze this man and discover why he is unique, death eventually becomes infatuated with him, so much so that she takes on human form to meet him. Upon visiting the cellist, she plans to personally give him the letter; instead, she falls in love with him, and, by doing so, she becomes even more human-like. The book ends, as it began, by stating that no one died the next day.

== Style ==
As with many of his other works, Saramago largely eschews traditional forms of grammar and punctuation. Many of his sentences are written in a style almost akin to stream of consciousness. Saramago avoids using quotations to signify speech, instead relying on inline text, and the usage of capitalization to signify the start of a new speaker's words. Often, instead of using periods, Saramago uses commas to break up sentences. He avoids the capitalization of proper nouns (i.e., names of people or places) and especially of his protagonist "death" who emphatically insists that her name be written lowercase.
