= Bartolomeu de Gusmão =

Portuguese priest and naturalist

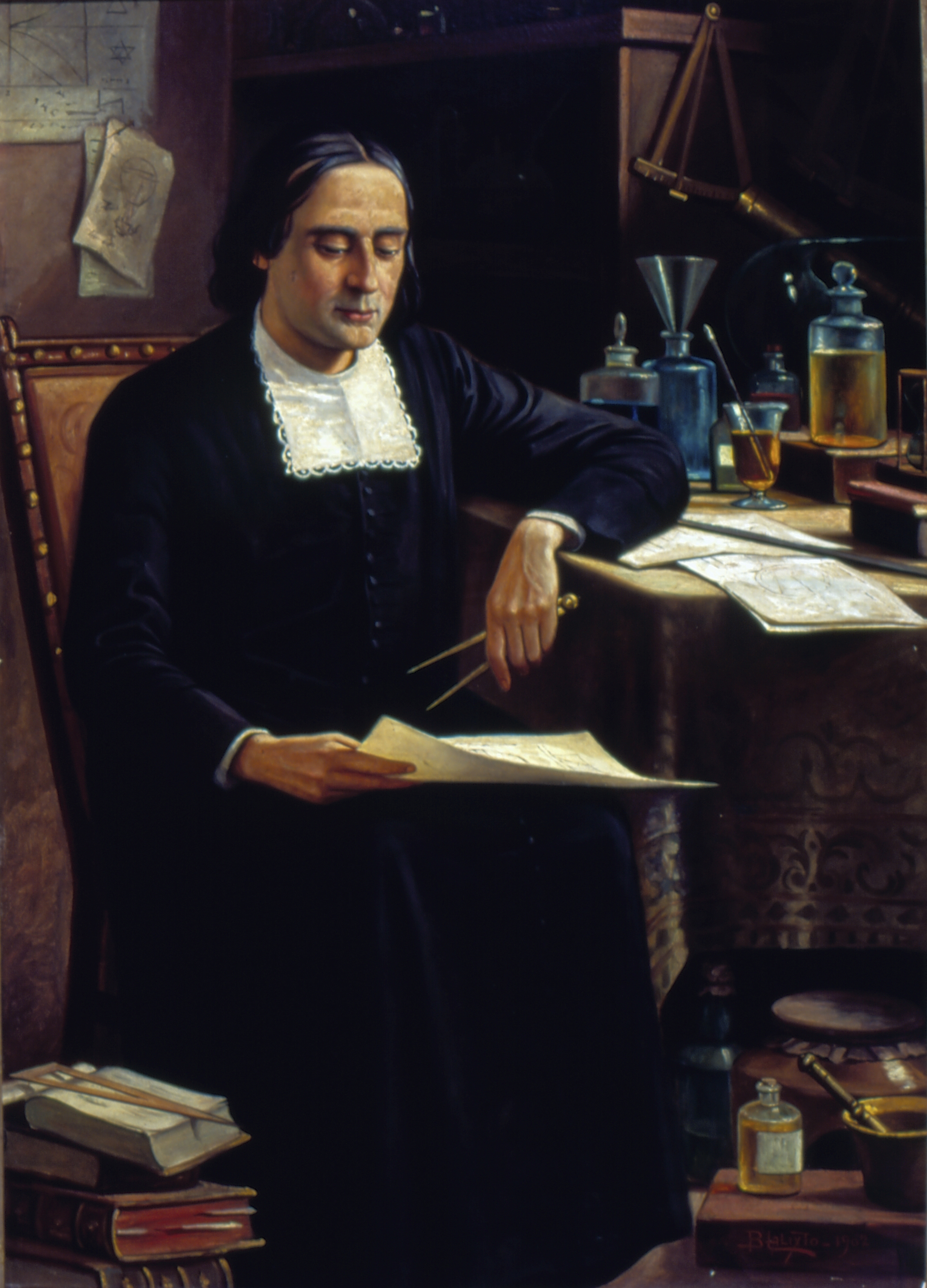
- Painting of Bartolomeu de Gusmão by Benedito Calixto
- Born: December 1685; Santos, São Paulo, Colonial Brazil, Portugal
- Died: 18 November 1724 (aged 38); Toledo, Spain
- Known for: Airship design
- Notable work: Hot air balloon, Passarola, Water elevation system

Signature
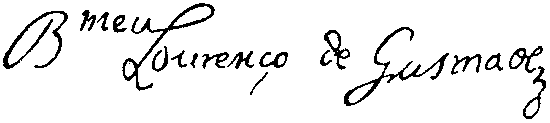

Bartolomeu Lourenço de Gusmão (December 1685 – 18 November 1724) was a Portuguese Catholic priest and naturalist born in colonial Brazil, who was a pioneer of lighter-than-air aerostat design, being among the first scholars at that time to understand the operational principles of the hot air balloon and to build a functional prototype of such a device. He is also one of the main characters in Nobel Prize-winning José Saramago's Baltasar and Blimunda.

== Early life ==
Gusmão was born at Santos, then part of the Portuguese colony of Brazil.

He began his novitiate in the Society of Jesus at Bahia when he was about fifteen years old, but left the order in 1701. He went to Portugal and found a patron at Lisbon in the person of the Marquis of Abrantes. He completed his course of study at the University of Coimbra, devoting his attention principally to philology and mathematics, but received the title of Doctor of Canon Law (related to Theology). He is said to have had a remarkable memory and a great command of languages.

== Airship ==
In 1709, he presented a petition to King John V of Portugal, seeking royal favour for his invention of an airship, in which he expressed the greatest confidence. The contents of this petition have been preserved, together with a picture and description of his airship. Developing the ideas of Francesco Lana de Terzi, S.J., Gusmão wanted to spread a huge sail over a boat-like body like the cover of a transport wagon; the boat itself was to contain tubes through which, when there was no wind, air would be blown into the sail by means of bellows. The vessel was to be propelled by the agency of magnets which were to be encased in two hollow metal balls. The public test of the machine, which was set for 24 June 1709, did not take place.

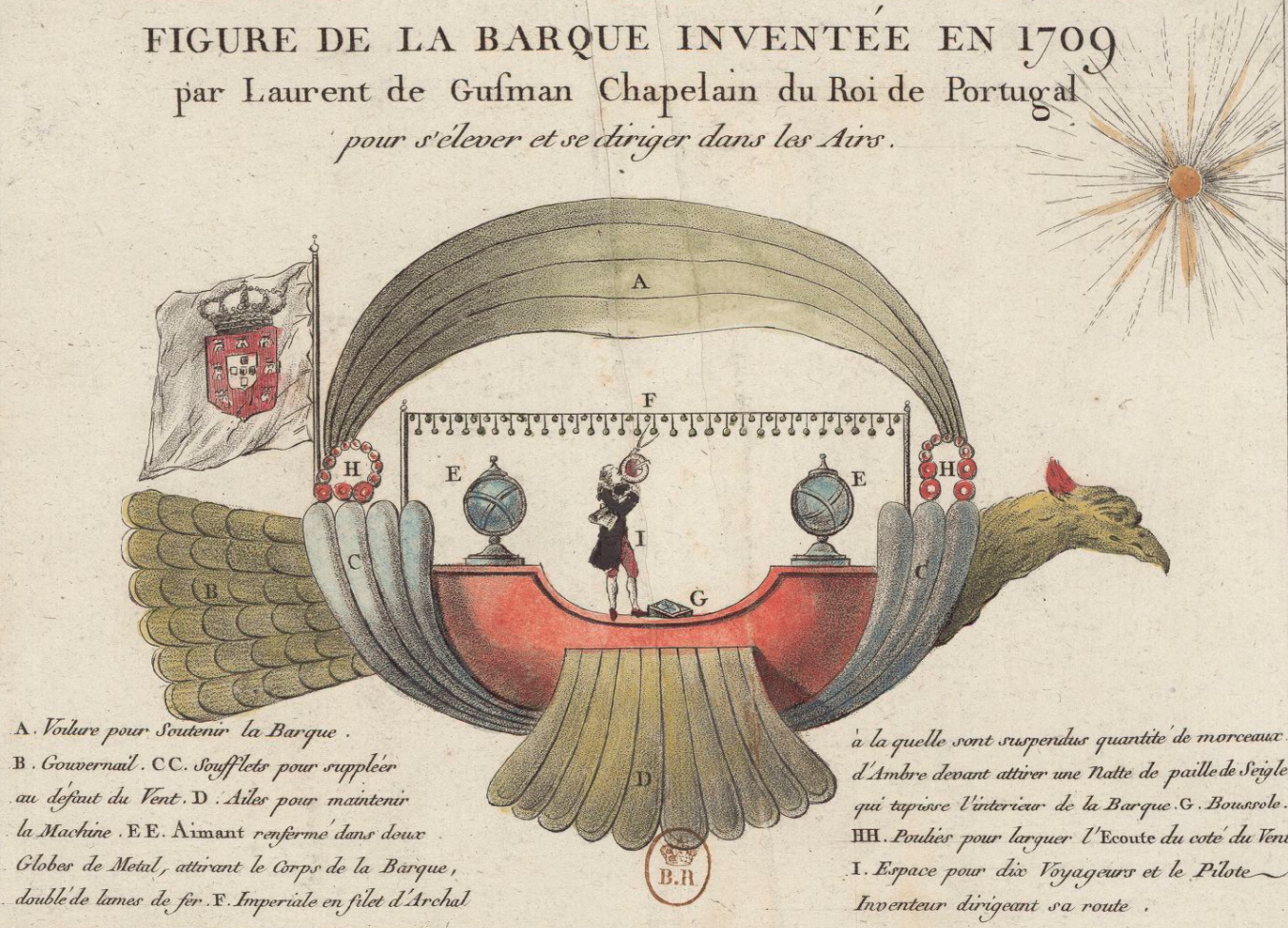
Artistic impression of the Passarola, a conceptual airship imagined by Bartolomeu de Gusmão

It is known that Gusmão was working on this principle at the public exhibition he gave before the Court on 8 August 1709, in the hall of the Casa da Índia in Lisbon, when he propelled a small balloon to the roof using combustion from a flame. The king rewarded the inventor by appointing him to a professorship at Coimbra and made him a canon. He was also one of the fifty selected as members of the Academia Real de História, founded in 1720; and in 1722 he was made chaplain to the Court. Gusmão also busied himself with other inventions, but in the meantime continued his work on his airship schemes, the idea for which he is said to have conceived while a novice at Bahia. His designs included a ship to sail in the air consisting of a triangular gas-filled pyramid, but he died without making progress.

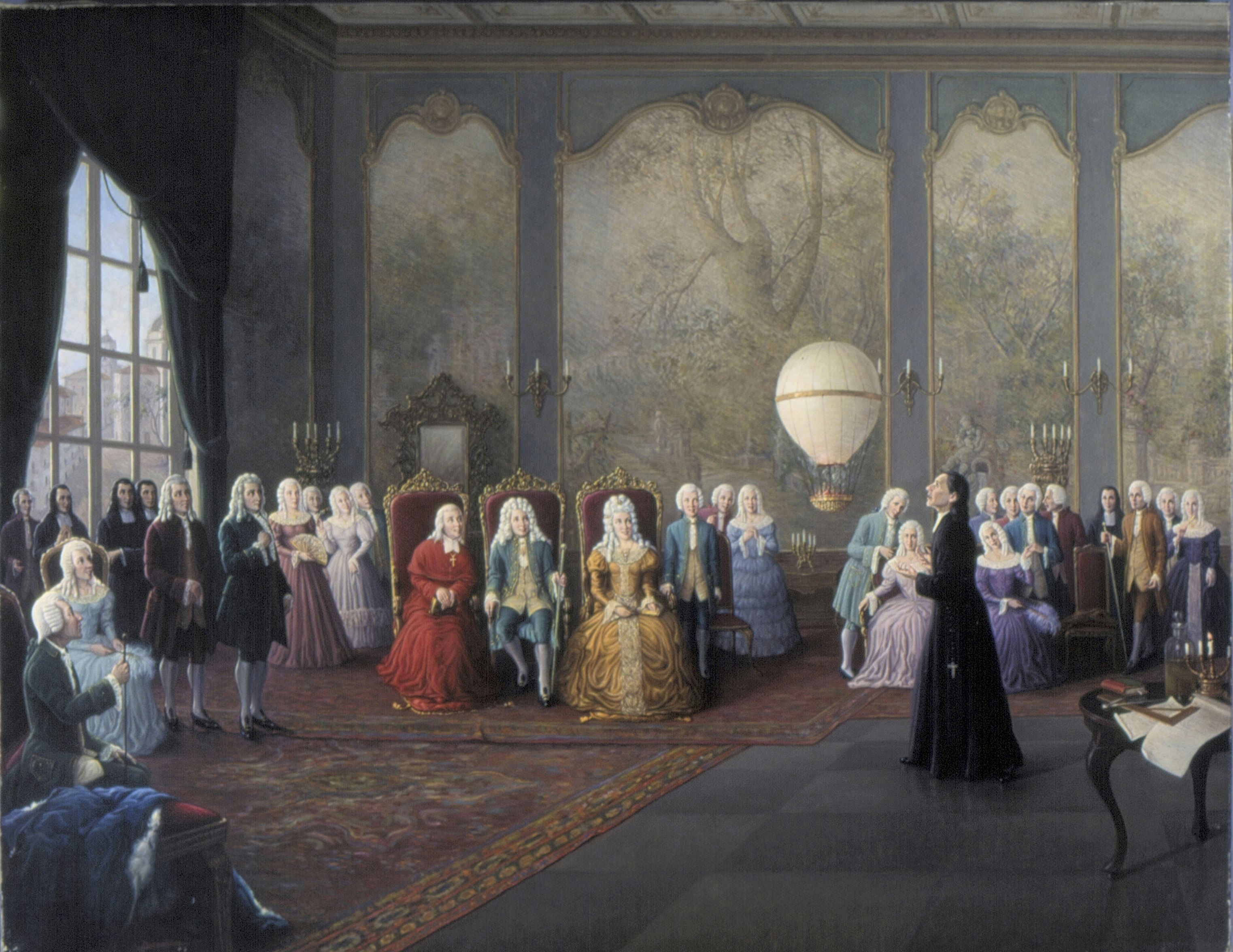
Painting depicting the presentation before the Portuguese court of a small hot air balloon developed by Bartolomeu de Gusmão

== Persecution ==
One account of Gusmão's work suggests that the Portuguese Inquisition forbade him to continue his aeronautic investigations and persecuted him because of them, but this is probably a later invention. It dates, however, from at least the end of the 18th century, as the following article in the London Daily Universal Register (later The Times) of 20 October 1786, makes clear:

By accounts from Lisbon we are assured, that in consequence of the experiments made there with the Montgolfier balloon, the literati of Portugal had been incited to make numerous researches on the subject; in consequence of which they pretend that the honour of the invention is due to Portugal. They say that in 1720, a Brazilian Jesuit, named Bartholomew Gusmao, possessed of abilities, imagination, and address, by permission of John V. fabricated a balloon in a place contiguous to the Royal Palace, and one day, in presence of their Majesties, and an immense crowd of spectators, raised himself, by means of a fire lighted in the machine, as high as the cornice of the building; but through the negligence and want of experience of those who held the cords, the machine took an oblique direction, and, touching the cornice, burst and fell.

The balloon was in the form of a bird with a tail and wings. The inventor proposed to make new experiments, but, chagrined at the raillery of the common people, who called him wizzard, and terrified by the Inquisition, he took the advice of his friends, burned his manuscripts, disguised himself, and fled to Spain, where he soon after died in an hospital.

They add, that several learned men, French and English, who had been at Lisbon to verify the fact, had made enquiries at the Carmelite monastery, where Gusmao had a brother, who had preserved some of his manuscripts on the manner of constructing aerostatic machines. Various living persons affirm that they were present at the Jesuit's experiments, and that he received the surname of Voador, or Flying-man.

Contemporary documents do attest that information was laid before the Inquisition against Gusmão, but on quite another charge. The inventor fled to Spain and fell ill of a fever, of which he died in Toledo. He wrote: Manifesto summário para os que ignoram poderse navegar pelo elemento do ar (Short Manifesto for those who are unaware that is possible to sail through the element air, 1709); and Vários modos de esgotar sem gente as naus que fazem água (Several ways of draining, without people, ships that leak water, 1710); some of his sermons also have been printed.

== Legacy ==
In 1936, the Bartolomeu de Gusmão Airport was built in Rio de Janeiro, Brazil, by the Luftschiffbau Zeppelin to operate with the rigid airships Graf Zeppelin and Hindenburg. In 1941, it was taken over by the Brazilian Air Force and renamed Santa Cruz Air Force Base. Presently, the airport serving Araraquara is named Bartolomeu de Gusmão Airport.

== In popular culture ==
- Passarola Rising by Azhar Abidi
- Baltasar and Blimunda by José Saramago

== See also ==
- List of firsts in aviation
- Adelir Antônio de Carli, aka Padre Baloeiro, a Brazilian priest who died during an attempt at cluster ballooning in 2008
- List of Catholic clergy scientists
