= Skylight (novel) =

2011 novel by José Saramago

- First edition (publ. Editorial Caminho)
- Author: José Saramago
- Original title: Claraboia
- Translator: Margaret Jull Costa (2014)
- Language: Portuguese
- Set in: Lisbon
- Publisher: Editorial Caminho
- Publication date: 2011
- Publication place: Portugal
- English publication date: 2014
- Media type: Print
- Pages: 398 (299 en.)

Skylight is a novel by Portuguese writer José Saramago.

Originally Saramago's second finished novel, the manuscript was submitted in 1953 and misplaced by the publisher. Upon its rediscovery 36 years later, Saramago decided to withhold publication until after his death. Skylight was published in Portugal in 2011, one year after the writer's death, and features a foreword penned by Saramago's widow, Pilar del Río, detailing his response to its rediscovery. It was translated into English by Margaret Jull Costa and published in 2014 by Houghton Mifflin Harcourt.

The novel explores the lives of various characters in a shabby Lisbon apartment building in the 1940s.
