= Journey to Portugal =

1981 non-fiction book by José Saramago

- First edition cover
- Author: José Saramago
- Publisher: Círculo de Leitores e Editorial Caminho
- Publication date: 1981

Journey to Portugal: In Pursuit of Portugal's History and Culture (Viagem a Portugal in Portuguese) is a non-fiction book on Portugal by Portuguese author José Saramago. It was first published in 1981 by Círculo de Leitores e Editorial Caminho.

== Critical assessment ==
An English language translation was published in 2001. A review in Publishers Weekly praised the book, calling it a "monumental work, a literary hybrid that intermingles an intimate portrait of a nation with aspects of a novel, travel log and guide book." Writing in The New York Times, Michael Pye was critical of the book, saying "As books of travel go, this one goes wrong from the start; it is downright solipsistic", and concluded that the book was better as a guide to Saramago rather than as a guide to Portugal. The book was also reviewed in World Literature Today, The Washington Post, New Statesman, and The Spectator.
