= The Traveller's Baggage =

A Bagagem Do Viajante: Cronicas (The Traveller's Baggage)
- First edition
- Author: Jose Saramago
- Language: Portuguese
- Publisher: Futura
- Publication date: 1973
- Publication place: Portugal

The Traveller's Baggage (Portuguese: A Bagagem do Viajante) is a volume of newspaper articles by Nobel Prize-winning author José Saramago. It was first published in 1973.

This title consists of more than 59 chronicles, first published in the evening newspaper A Capital (1969) and in the "Jornal do Fundão" (1971-1972). In these chronicles, we see much of Saramago, who was restless about the situation in his country at the time and opposed to Marcelo Caetano's government.

As well as being published in Portugal, initially by Editorial Futura and later by Editorial Caminho, the work has been published in Brazil (1996), Argentina (2010), Mexico (1994), Spain (1992) and Italy (1992).
