= Isabel da Nóbrega =

Portuguese author (1925–2021)

- Born: Maria Isabel Guerra Bastos Gonçalves; 26 June 1925; Lisbon, Portugal
- Died: 2 September 2021 (aged 96); Estoril, Portugal
- Occupations: author, translator, playwright
- Spouse: João Gaspar Simões (1954–1968) José Saramago (1970–1986)
- Writing career
- Pen name: Isabel da Nóbrega
- Notable works: Os Anjos e os Homens (The Angels and Men)

Maria Isabel Guerra Bastos Gonçalves, who used the pseudonym Isabel da Nóbrega (26 June 1925 – 2 September 2021), was a Portuguese writer, playwright, columnist, translator and radio broadcaster. On 9 June 2000, she was made a Grand-Officer of the Order of Merit. On 25 April 2011, she was made a Grand-Officer of the Order of Liberty.

== Biography ==
Maria Isabel Guerra Bastos Gonçalves was born in Lisbon, on 26 June 1925. Her father was a doctor, and she was raised in a Protestant family. She died in Estoril on 2 September 2021.

== Career ==
She adopted the pseudonym of Isabel da Nóbrega, and published several works, including plays, screenplays for film and television, novels, and other works under this name. She was a member of PEN Portugal, and the Portuguese Association of Writers. In 1974, she was one of the organizers of the 1st Portuguese Writers' Congress.

Her first major published work was a novel, Os Anjos e os Homens (The Angels and Men) in 1952. It was followed by Viver com os outros (Living with others) in 1964, her best-known work. Her other books include Solo para gravador (1973), Cartas de Amor de Gente Famosa (2009). She also wrote a number of books for children, including Rama the Blue Elephant (1971).

In 1954, her play O Filho Pródigo ou o Amor Difícil was produced at the Teatro Nacional D. Maria II by Rey Colaço-Robles Monteiro. Several of her other plays were also produced in Portugal, including A Cigarra e as Formigas (1971), and O Filho de Rama (1998).

Isabel da Nóbrega translated a number of works into Portuguese, including Tolstoy's War and Peace, Time to love, Time to die by Erich Maria Remarque, and A Gun for Sale by Graham Greene. She translated chiefly from French and English, including works by Léon Bloy, Gilbert Cesbron, Luigi Pirandello and E. Caldwell.

She was a founding member and columnist for the newspaper, A Capital, and wrote columns for Diário de Lisboa, Diário de Notícias, and Primeiro de Janeiro. She broadcast two programs for RDP Internacional, Portugal's national broadcasting service: 'O Prazer de Ler' and 'Largo do Pelourinho'. She also presented radio programs on radio channels, Antena 1 and Antena 2 titled Conversar, conviver and Clarabóia. Some of her columns were collected and published in a book titled Quadratim I (1976).

== Personal life ==
Isabel da Nóbrega was initially in a relationship with cardiologist Abreu Loureiro. After they separated, for several years, she was in a relationship with critic and writer João Gaspar Simões, and his 1975 novel, The Hands and the Gloves, is reportedly an account of their relationships, in which he compares her to Madame Bovary. It was published shortly after the end of their affair, when she went to live with José Saramago. She was later in a relationship for twenty years with writer José Saramago, who initially dedicated two of his novels to her: O Ano da Morte de Ricardo Reis (1984), and Memorial do Convento (1985). He later removed the dedications from subsequent editions after their relationship ended. She was a close friend of writers Natália Correia and Sophia de Mello Breyner Andresen.

Her sister Maria Teresa Guerra Bastos Gonçalves, known as Tareka, was an actress.

== Awards ==
Isabel da Nóbrega won several awards during her career, including:

- 1965 – Camilo Castelo Branco Prize for her novel, Viver com os outros (Living with others)
- Children's and Youth Literature Award
- Career Consecration Award of the Portuguese Society of Authors
- The Femina Prize for Merit in Literature.
- 2000 – Ordem do Mérito (Order of Merit, Portugal)
- 2008 – Career Consecration Award from the Society of Portuguese Authors
- 2011 – Ordem do Liberdade (Order of Liberty, Portugal)
