= Azinhaga =

- Civil parish
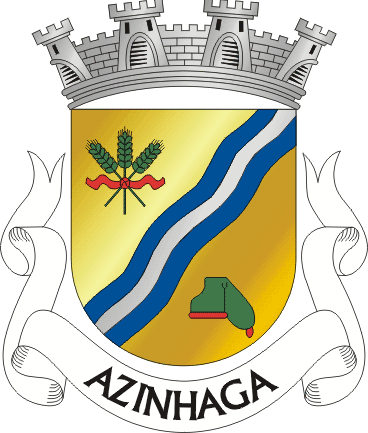
- Coat of arms

- Location in Portugal
- Coordinates: 39.347°N 8.532°W
- Country: Portugal
- Region: Oeste e Vale do Tejo
- Intermunic. comm.: Lezíria do Tejo
- District: Santarém
- Municipality: Golegã

Area
  - Total: 38.21 km^{2} (14.75 sq mi)

Population (2011)
  - Total: 1,620
  - Density: 42/km^{2} (110/sq mi)
- Time zone: UTC+00:00 (WET)
  - Summer (DST): UTC+01:00 (WEST)

Azinhaga do Ribatejo or simply Azinhaga (Portuguese pronunciation: [ɐziˈɲaɣɐ]) is a village and a civil parish in the municipality of Golegã, Santarém District, Lezíria do Tejo (roughly the same territory of the historical province of Ribatejo), Portugal. The population of Azinhaga civil parish in 2011 was 1,620, in an area of 38.21 km^{2}.

== History ==
Azinhaga was the birthplace of the 1998 Nobel Prize in Literature-winning author José Saramago (born in 1922) who in Memories of My Youth (first published in 2006) gave a detailed account in words of Azinhaga in the first half of the 20th century. In 1938, Azinhaga won the title of Ribatejo's Most Portuguese Village, awarded by the Portuguese Secretariat for Propaganda under the Estado Novo regime (at the same government-sponsored competition, Monsanto, in Idanha-a-Nova, won the title of Portugal's Most Portuguese Village). From the mid-1940s to the 1980s, Azinhaga was the site of a nationally renowned tomato paste factory - the Sociedade Industrial de Concentrados (SIC). Like many other previously successful Portuguese exporters (i.e. CUF and others), it didn't survive the far-left politics, labor movement-inspired PREC (1975) and its influence over Portuguese economy, society and government policies. In the 1990s, 2000s and 2010s, Azinhaga benefited from European Union Structural and Cohesion Funds. Several amenities were built, expanded or modernized during this period, from comprehensive asphalt road and sewer system, to new education and sports infrastructure.

== Geography ==
The population of Azinhaga civil parish in 2011 was 1,620, in an area of 38.21 km^{2}. The village of Azinhaga is located along the right bank of the river Almonda which is itself near the right bank of the Tagus River, in a large floodplain renowned for its high-yield farmland. The village proper is about 18 to 20 meters high above sea level. Azinhaga is about 28 kilometers away by road from the district capital, the city of Santarém, and the seat of the municipality, the town of Golegã, is about 8 kilometers to the northeast.

== Economy ==
Besides a number of small retail stores and local shops, as well as agriculture and animal husbandry-related activities, Azinhaga has municipal swimming pool, tennis court, kindergarten and elementary school; the offices of Azinhaga civil parish local government (freguesia, the third layer of official administrative authority in Portugal), local state-run healthcare center of the Portuguese National Health Service; a local branch of the Santa Casa da Misericórdia charity and the local branch of the José Saramago Foundation which has its headquarters based in Lisbon and includes a library. Azinhaga is served by the train station of Mato de Miranda. The main agricultural productions are maize and Beta vulgaris. It is in an area which is a reputed animal producing center and an internationally renowned cattle and horse market.
