= This World and the Other =

First edition (publ. Arcadia)

This World and the Other (original Portuguese title: Deste Mundo e do Outro) is a volume of newspaper articles by the Nobel Prize-winning author José Saramago. It was first published in 1971.
