= Araraquara Airport =

Bartholomeu de Gusmão State Airport Aeroporto Estadual Bartholomeu de Gusmão
- IATA: AQA; ICAO: SBAQ; LID: SP0012

Summary
- Airport type: Public
- Operator: DAESP (?–2021); Rede Voa (2021–present)
- Serves: Araraquara
- Time zone: BRT (UTC−03:00)
- Elevation AMSL: 712 m (2,336 ft)
- Coordinates: 21°48′43″S 048°07′59″W
- Website: redevoa.com.br/nossos-aeroportos/aeroporto-bartolomeu-de-gusmao-araraquara-sp/

Map
- Location in Brazil AQA (Brazil)

Runways
Direction	Length		Surface
Direction	m	ft	Surface
17/35	1,800	5,905	Asphalt

Statistics (2019)
- Passengers: 5,919 ▲192%
- Aircraft Operations: 2,688 ▼25%
- Statistics: DAESP; Sources: Airport Website, ANAC, DECEA

Bartholomeu de Gusmão State Airport (IATA: AQA, ICAO: SBAQ) is a state-owned airport serving Araraquara, Brazil. It is named after Bartolomeu Lourenço de Gusmão (1685-1724), a Portuguese priest born in Brazil, who did research about transportation with balloons.

It is operated by Rede Voa.

== History ==
The airport was opened in 1935 by the then Mayor Heitor de Souza Pinheiro.

On July 15, 2021 the concession of the airport was auctioned to Rede Voa, under the name Consórcio Voa NW e Voa SE. The airport was previously operated by DAESP.

== Airlines and destinations ==
Airlines	Destinations
Azul Conecta	Campinas

== Access ==
The airport is located 6 km (4 mi) from downtown Araraquara.

== See also ==
- List of airports in Brazil
