= Land of Sin =

1947 novel by José Saramago

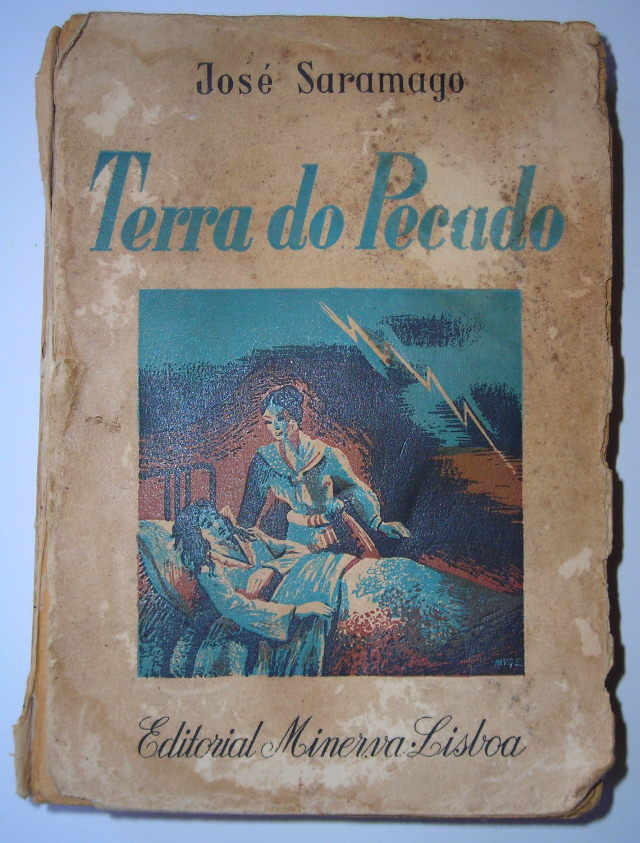
First edition

Land of Sin or Country of Sin (Portuguese: Terra do Pecado), published in 1947, is the first novel by author José Saramago, who in 1998 became the first author writing in Portuguese to win the Nobel Prize for Literature. It tells the story of a widow, Maria Leonor, who starts an affair with her brother-in-law and confides in her family doctor.

On first release, Country of Sin was not commercially successful. After its publication, Saramago was able to leave his job in a welder's shop and work at a literary magazine instead, but he did not publish another novel for 19 years.

The style of the novel has been compared to those of the 19th century, in its prose, plot and structure.

Saramago, who was 24 when Country of Sin was published, later disowned the book.

== Works ==
- Costa, Horácio (2001). "Saramago's Construction of Fictional Characters: From Terra do Pecado to Baltasar and Blimunda". Portuguese Literary and Cultural Studies. 6 (On Saramago). Translated by DaCosta Holton, Kimberly: 33–48.
- Victor E. Taylor; Charles E. Winquist, eds. (2003). "José Saramago". Encyclopedia of Postmodernism. Psychology Press. pp. 353–354. ISBN 978-0-415-30886-1.
