= Opinions That DL Had =

1974 novel by José Saramago

First edition (publ. Seara Nova)

Opinions That DL Had (Portuguese: As opiniões que o DL teve) is a 1974 novel by Portuguese author José Saramago.
