= Ilda Reis =

Portuguese engraver (1923-1998)

- Born: January 1, 1923; Lisbon, Portugal
- Died: 1998 (aged 75); Lisbon, Portugal
- Known for: Painting

Ilda Reis (1923-1998) was a Portuguese artist known for her engraving.

Reis was born on January 1, 1923 in Lisbon, Portugal. In 1944 she married the writer José Saramago (1922–2010) with whom she had one child. The couple divorced in 1988.

Reis died in Lisbon in 1998.

Her work is in the collection of the Fundação Calouste Gulbenkian (Calouste Gulbenkian Museum), the Casa de Serralves, and the Museu de Setúbal. In 2023, (the 100 anniversary of Reis' birth) the Biblioteca Nacional de Portugal (National Library of Portugal) held an exhibition in her honor.
