= Baltasar and Blimunda =

1982 novel by José Saramago

- First edition (Portuguese)
- Author: José Saramago
- Original title: Memorial do Convento
- Translator: Giovanni Pontiero
- Cover artist: Fresco from the nave of Abbey Church of Saint-Savin-sur-Gartempe
- Language: Portuguese
- Publisher: Editorial Caminho
- Publication date: 1982
- Publication place: Portugal
- English publication date: 1987
- ISBN: 978-1-86046-901-5
- OCLC: 47037980
- Followed by: The Year of the Death of Ricardo Reis

Baltasar and Blimunda (Portuguese: Memorial do Convento) is a 1982 historical novel by the Portuguese author José Saramago. It was Saramago's international breakthrough.

== Plot ==
The novel is an 18th-century love story intertwined with the construction of the Convent of Mafra, now one of Portugal's chief tourist attractions, as a background. Two young lovers interact naturally with historical characters including the composer and harpsichordist Domenico Scarlatti and the priest Bartolomeu de Gusmão, recognized today as an aviation pioneer, and also a wide range of workers and other characters, all in the shadow of the Inquisition.

== Literary style and themes ==
The novel mixes historicity with fantasy, romance and critique of social inequities. Saramago's narrative style blends dialogue, description and commentary in a dense and multifaceted text. The novel has been described as a mix of magical realism and neorealism. It deals with themes found in all societies and cultures: the dynamics of power, wealth and politics, and is also a love story. Saramago has said that with his fictional portrayal of the peasant workers who built Convent of Mafra and other characters in the novel he wanted to depict people who are never mentioned in history. The construction of an aviation machine is an integral part of the novel, and when finished it allegorically lifts the lovers out of reach of the injusticies and the Inquisition.

== Adaptation ==
The book served as the basis for the opera Blimunda (1990), composed by Azio Corghi.

== Critical reception ==
"Much reverberates in memory after reading this enchanting novel, but most of all the love story which soars over the rest of the action like a flute across a heavy orchestra. Mr. Saramago, a writer of sharp intelligence, keeps this love story under strict control, free of pathos or sentimentality. It is a love of, and on, this earth." – Irving Howe in The New York Times 1987.
