= The Cave (novel) =

Portuguese novel published in 2000

- First edition
- Author: José Saramago
- Original title: A caverna
- Translator: Margaret Costa
- Language: Portuguese
- Publisher: Caminho
- Publication date: 2000
- Publication place: Portugal
- English publication date: 2002
- Media type: Print (Hardcover)
- Pages: 320 pp
- ISBN: 0-15-602879-4
- OCLC: 53143425

The Cave (Portuguese: A caverna) is a novel by Portuguese author José Saramago who received the Nobel Prize in 1998. It was published in Portuguese in 2000 and in English in 2002.

== Plot ==
The story concerns an elderly potter named Cipriano Algor, his daughter Marta, and his son-in-law Marçal. One day, the Center, literally the center of commerce in the story, cancels its order for Cipriano's pottery, leaving the elderly potter's future in doubt. He and Marta decide to try their hand at making clay figurines and astonishingly the Center places an order for hundreds. But just as quickly, the order is cancelled and Cipriano, his daughter, and his son-in-law have no choice but to move to the Center where Marçal works as a security guard. Before long, the mysterious sound of digging can be heard beneath the Center, and what the family discovers will change their lives forever.

== See also ==
- Allegory of the cave
- Plato
