= Cain (novel) =

2009 novel by José Saramago

- First edition (publ. Caminho)
- Author: José Saramago
- Original title: Caim
- Translator: Margaret Jull Costa
- Language: Portuguese
- Genre: Historical fiction
- Publisher: Editorial Caminho, Houghton Mifflin Harcourt
- Publication date: 2009
- Publication place: Portugal
- English publication date: 2011
- Pages: 176pp (en.)
- ISBN: 0-547-41989-9

Cain is the last novel by the Nobel Prize-winning Portuguese author José Saramago. The book was first published in 2009. In an earlier novel, The Gospel According to Jesus Christ, Saramago retold the main events of the life of Jesus Christ, as narrated in the New Testament, presenting God as the villain. In Cain, Saramago focuses on the Hebrew Bible (mainly the Pentateuch).

== Plot summary ==
The novel is mostly told through the eyes of Cain as he witnesses and recounts passages from the Bible that add to his increasing hatred of God.

- A preliminary part follows the story line of the early chapters in the Book of Genesis, describing the Original Sin, Fall of Man, and the expulsion of Adam and Eve from Paradise — depicted as a rebellion against the dictatorial and unjust rule of God. To this, Saramago adds various anecdotes not attested in the Bible – such as the expelled Adam and Eve starving in the wilderness, whereupon the coquettish Eve flirts with the angel guarding the barred gates of Paradise, and gets him to provide some fruits from the forbidden garden, behind God's back. There is a hint that the angel, rather than Adam, fathered Eve's son Abel.
- The story of the birth of Cain and Abel, their jealousy and Cain's killing of Abel also follows closely the Biblical text — the main difference is that after the murder, the Bible's account of a righteous angry God banishing Cain to a life of perpetual wandering is replaced by Saramago with Cain debating with God as an equal, proving that God was in fact an accomplice to the killing of Abel, and getting God to promise to safeguard Cain from all threats during his wanderings.
- There follows a long episode based not on the Bible but on the later myth of Lilith. The wandering Cain reaches a small city-state where he is at first employed as a manual worker in the construction of a palace. He soon catches the attention of the wanton Queen Lilith. After being cleaned up (and sexually titillated) by female slaves, he is taken into Lilith's bed and becomes her lover (a theme loosely reminiscent of The Arabian Nights). Cain is firmly established in his role as the Queen's lover, survives an assassination attempt by Lilith's ineffective husband Noah, and gets Lilith pregnant – whereupon he is overcome by wanderlust and departs on a wondrous clever donkey, the parting gift of the heartbroken Lilith.
- Upon Cain's departure from Lilith's city, he undergoes a series of time travels, taking him back and forth to various episodes in the Bible – all calculated to present to Cain (and to the reader) God at His most cruel and unjust. The agency thus moving Cain through time and space is never shown or identified.
- Cain gets to the scene of Abraham about to kill his son Isaac, at the order of God. In Saramago's version, it was Cain who prevented the killing of the child from taking place – the angel sent to prevent it having been delayed by an accident, and but for Cain would have gotten there too late. Cain is angry at God ordering a father to kill his son, and gets the young Isaac to be rather rebellious at his father's stern religion. In an ironical aside, Cain asks "If God had a son, would He kill that son, too?" (Readers familiar with the New Testament know that God would indeed do that, too.)
- Cain witnesses God's foiling the erection of the Tower of Babylon, followed by God sending a storm to utterly demolish the unfinished Tower. Cain considers the Tower a worthy and beautiful enterprise, and its destruction as a manifestation of God's narrow-minded jealousy. However, Cain must escape from the frustrated would-be builders of the Tower, who seek to rob the plentiful food carried in the panniers of Cain's donkey. In an ironical aside Saramago notes that the builders originally all spoke Hebrew, but that in order to confuse them God made some of them speak hitherto non-existent languages such as English, German, French, Italian, Basque, Latin, Greek, and some even speaking… Portuguese.
- Cain then meets Abraham again at an earlier period of the Patriarch's life, is graciously hosted by him and witnesses the angels informing the aged Sarah that she would bear a son. Cain then follows Abraham to the destruction of Sodom and Gomorrah. Cain witnesses Abraham trying to save the two doomed cities, as recounted in the Bible, and getting God to agree to spare Sodom if there were even Ten Righteous People to be found there. Abraham finally concedes that there were none such, and that therefore God was right to pour fire and brimstone on the two cities and annihilate their inhabitants. However, Cain considers Abraham a gullible fool. In Cain's view, God was determined all along to destroy the two cities, had made no real effort to look for Righteous People, and his bargaining with Abraham was a simple trick. In particular, Cain is shocked by God killing the children of Sodom, who certainly were not culpable for their parents' sins. Throughout the rest of the book, Cain, again and again, refers to the burned bodies of the Sodom children lying among the ruins – an evident evocation of the children killed in the bombings of modern wars.
- Cain is next transported to Mount Sinai, witnesses the creation of the Golden Calf by Aaron and the worshiping of Calf by the Israelites, impatient for Moses' return. Finally, Cain is present at the massacre of 3,000 calf-worshipers by the angry Moses, at God's command. Cain is incensed and disgusted by God ordering such carnage because of a stupid, clumsy rival – a statue made of gold. He considers it to be a much worse act than his own killing of Abel.
- Next is the war of the Israelites against the Midianites – culminating with Moses ordering the wholesale massacre of the defeated men and of women who had known men, while the Midianite virgins are treated as loot, to be divided among the victors in the same way as the captured cattle is divided. Cain recounts with increasing revulsion the precise statistics – 675,000 sheep, 72,000 cows, 61,000 donkeys and 32,000 virgin women – all to be divided fairly and equally among the victors.
- Then Cain gets to witness the conquest of Canaan by the Israelites under Joshua – first the fall of Jericho and the wholesale massacre of its inhabitants, and then the same fate inflicted on the Ai. Cain, who had gained some skill in taking care of donkeys, is affably welcomed by the conquerors of Canaan, who graciously invite him to continue with them and witness the destruction and massacre in store for many more Canaanite cities – but he, revolted, turns away to continue his wandering. Incidentally, in Saramago's account, God does not stop the Sun in the sky to give the Israelite hosts more time to utterly defeat their enemies. Stopping the Earth from turning would instantly kill everybody on it (as pointed out in a classic H.G. Wells story) and not even God could prevent that. Rather, God performs the more meager miracle of dispersing clouds from the sky, giving the Israelites more light to fight in. The result is the same – the Canaanites are utterly defeated and massacred.
- Cain returns briefly to Lilith's city, where ten years have passed, to find that he had fathered upon her the child Enoch. Lilith very enthusiastically welcomes him back to her bed, but he soon becomes bored, and after two weeks departs again.
- Cain gets to the Land of Uz, finds humble work caring for the donkeys of an immensely rich man named Job, and witnesses all the terrible sufferings imposed on Job by Satan, with the authorization of God. Cain meets two angels which he had met before – the same who visited Abraham and who nearly suffered homosexual rape in Sodom, and who are grateful to Cain for having saved them from that fate. The angels, now sent as observers to monitor Satan's dealings with Job, tell Cain that "Satan had this time overdone it, a bit" – but Cain questions "What is Satan doing in the councils of God in the first place?" and starts suspecting that, in fact, Satan is just God Himself, a disguise used when He wants to do something particularly nasty without taking responsibility for it. Job retains unshaken his faith in God, of which the watching Cain does not approve. Finally, Job gets back an even greater wealth than he had before, and has new seven sons and three daughters instead of the ones killed by Satan – at which Cain wonders if children are just interchangeable, and if having new ones completely makes up for the wanton killing of the earlier ones.
- In the final episode, Cain goes back much earlier in time (and in the Bible) to witness the building of Noah's Ark, pointing out various deficiencies which would have made the Ark unseaworthy. Ultimately, construction of the Ark is completed with massive involvement of Angels and of God Himself – the task having proven far too much for Noah and his family. (Saramago does not explain if this Noah is the same as the one who was Lilith's husband.) God considers what to do about Cain, and finally orders him to take passage on the Ark during the coming Deluge – which turns out to be a big mistake on God's part. Once on board the Ark, Cain proceeds to systematically kill Noah's sons, their wives and Noah's wife (after first having had sex with all the women). The desperate Noah commits suicide by jumping into the Deluge waters. Once the Deluge is over, the Ark settles on Mount Ararat. God waits for Noah and his family to come out – but Cain lets out the animals and then confronts God, telling Him that the humans are all dead, and thus there will be no new Humanity to populate the Earth after the Deluge. Cain expects God to kill him for this – but God just tells him that he is going to live out the rest of his life, alone on the desolate Earth. Cain and God continue debating and will continue that for many years to come, but their further debates will not be reported. Curtain.
