= Note 2 =

Note 2 may refer to several smartphones:

- Meizu M2 Note
- Samsung Galaxy Note II
- Xiaomi Mi Note 2
- Xiaomi Redmi Note 2
