= José Saramago Foundation =

Portuguese cultural institution

Coordinates: 38.7091°N 9.1327°W

Fundação José Saramago
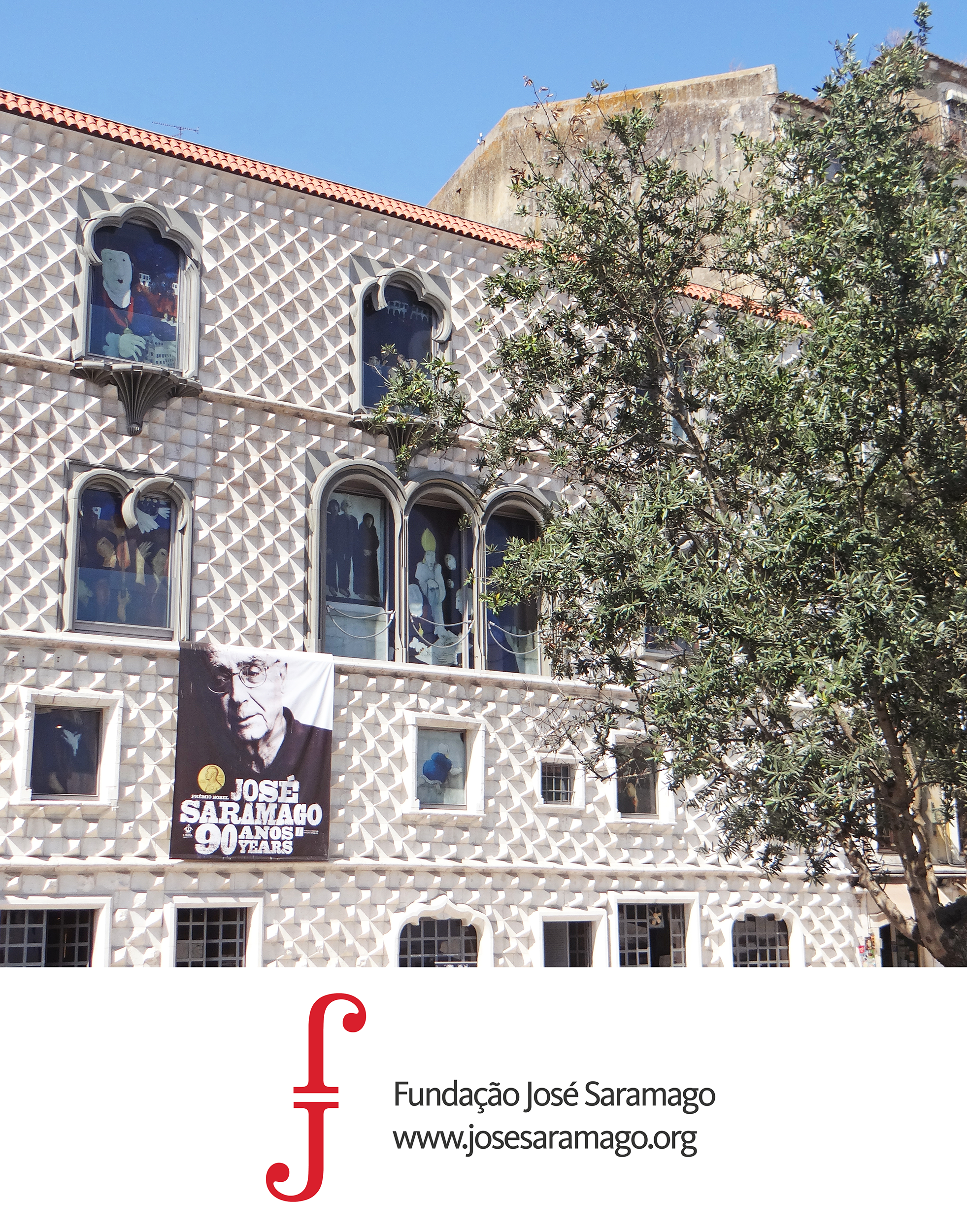
- Founded: 2007
- Founder: José Saramago
- Type: Private foundation
- Purpose: Literature, human rights, environmentalism, and education
- Location: Lisbon, Azinhaga, (Portugal)
- Region served: Global
- Website: www.josesaramago.org

The José Saramago Foundation is a cultural private institution headquartered in the Casa dos Bicos, in Lisbon (Portugal). A smaller branch has been opened in Azinhaga do Ribatejo, the home village of José Saramago, the Portuguese Nobel Prize in Literature 1998. Founded by the writer in June 2007, its main institutional principles are to defend and spread the Universal Declaration of Human Rights, the promotion of culture in Portugal as well as in all the countries, and particular concerns about environmentalism.

The Casa dos Bicos, being the head office of this institution since June 2012, also offers, along with the permanent exhibition The seed and the fruits, about the life and work of José Saramago, cultural events such as books launching, theater plays, conferences, debates, poetry sessions, music concerts, among others.

The house where the writer and his wife Pilar del Río lived until his death in 2010, called just A Casa (The House), is also open to visitors in Tías, Lanzarote (Spain).
