= The Notes =

Novel by José Saramago

First edition (publ. Seara Nova)

The Notes is a novel by Portuguese Nobel Prize-winning author José Saramago. It was first published in 1976.
