= All the Names =

1997 novel by José Saramago

- First edition (Portuguese)
- Author: José Saramago
- Original title: Todos os nomes
- Translator: Margaret Jull Costa
- Language: Portuguese
- Publisher: Caminho
- Publication date: 1997
- Publication place: Portugal
- English publication date: 1999
- ISBN: 1-86046-642-7
- OCLC: 41504630

All the Names (Portuguese: Todos os nomes) is a novel by the Portuguese author José Saramago, the recipient of the 1998 Nobel Prize in Literature. The novel was written in 1997, and Margaret Jull Costa's 1999 English translation of it won the Oxford-Weidenfeld Translation Prize.

== Plot summary ==
The main setting of the novel is the Central Registry of Births, Marriages and Deaths located in an ambiguous and unnamed city. This municipal archive holds the record cards for all of the residents of the city stretching back endlessly into the past.

The protagonist is named Senhor José; the only character in the novel to be given a proper name (all of the others are referred to simply by some unique and defining characteristic). Senhor José is around fifty years old and has worked as a low-level clerk in the Central Registry for more than two decades. Senhor José's residence, where he lives alone, adjoins the municipal building and contains the only side entrance into it. Lost in the tedium of a bureaucratic job, he starts to collect information about various famous people and decides, one evening, to use the side entrance to sneak in and steal their record cards.

On one nocturnal venture Senhor José grabs the record card of an "unknown woman" by mistake and quickly becomes obsessed with finding her. Senhor José uses his power as a registry clerk to gather information about the "unknown woman" from her past neighbors and, when it is suggested that he look her up in a phone book, he ignores the advice, choosing instead to keep his distance.

The search for this woman begins to consume him and affects his work to the point that it attracts the attention of the Registrar — head of the Central Registry — who, strangely, begins to regard Senhor José with sympathy. This special attention given to a clerk by the Registrar is unprecedented in the known history of the Central Registry and begins to worry his fellow employees. Senhor José further neglects his duties as a civil servant and risks his career to pursue this "unknown woman" he knows almost nothing about.

== Themes ==
One of the main themes in All the Names, highlighted through Senhor José's journey in piecing together the life of the unknown woman and the effects she had on the people and things, as well as the registry's conclusion that the living and dead's files should be put together as one, is that in order to be properly looked at, the human condition must include the lives of the living and the dead, the remembered and the forgotten, and the known and unknown. Indeed, this is a recurring theme in Saramago's works.

Another theme is the absurdity of human action. As Saramago puts it:

Strictly speaking, we do not make decisions, decisions make us. The proof can be found in the fact that, though life leads us to carry out the most diverse actions one after the other, we do not prelude each one with a period of reflection, evaluation and calculation, and only then declare ourselves able to decide if we will go out to lunch or buy a newspaper or look for the unknown woman."

A third overarching theme is a search for human connection in the face of bureaucratic strictures, as well as mortality. Saramago said that whilst the book could superficially be seen as one about death, 'não é assim, é uma obra sobre a vida' ('no, it's not like that, it's a work about life').

== Sources ==
- Saramago, José (2 September 1999). All the Names (1st Eng. ed.). Harcourt. ISBN 1-86046-642-7.
