= The History of the Siege of Lisbon =

1989 novel by José Saramago

First edition (pubi. Caminho)

The History of the Siege of Lisbon (Portuguese: História do Cerco de Lisboa) is a novel by Portuguese author José Saramago, first published in 1989.

It tells the story of a proofreader, Raimundo Silva, editing a book chronicling the Siege of Lisbon. For reasons he struggles to articulate, Silva interrupts the narrative by inserting a single word to say that, contrary to actual events, the Crusaders declined to help Afonso I of Portugal take Lisbon despite briefly landing in Portugal. Silva then begins a lengthy project constructing a hypothetical history where the Portuguese nevertheless conquer the Moors; he focuses on the perspectives of unknown soldiers and citizens rather than kings and generals.

Themes included in the book are language, history and historiography, and war in the medieval world. In the novel Saramago challenges the common one-dimensional interpretations of historical events that only focuses on kings and battles and ask for a more pluralistic perspective that include individual motives and behaviour and take into account the role of chance in shaping history.

== Plot summary ==
Raimundo Silva, a Portuguese proofreader, is enlisted by his publishing house to edit a book titled The History of the Siege of Lisbon. Fastidious and dedicated, Silva works slowly to ensure that every word is correct, but his publisher insists that he must submit the completed proof within a day when he is only halfway through the book. While rushing to finish, Silva spontaneously decides to alter a crucial sentence by inserting the word "not" in the text, so that the book now claims that the Crusaders did not come to the aid of the Portuguese king in taking Lisbon from the Moors. He struggles to articulate his reasons for doing so.

His publishers soon discover his mistake and discern that it was deliberate, leading them to threaten his job and the book's author to feel personally insulted. Though his job is spared, he is placed under the watch of Dr. Maria Sara, a new superior monitoring all the publishing house's proofreaders. Privately, Maria Sara gives Silva the first printing of the book without the later erratum correcting the mistake; she encourages him to complete this history as if the Crusaders indeed did not aid the Portuguese.

Silva spends much of his time working on this history, beginning with the hypothetical moment when the Crusaders decline to help the king and searching for a way for the Portuguese to nevertheless win the siege and thus fulfill the inevitable historical reality. He tells this story in the style of a historical romance. Silva tells the story largely through the perspective of imagined minor figures, such as a blind muezzin who is destined to be the last person to die in the siege; Heinrich, a German knight who is crushed under a siege engine of his own design; and Mogueime, a Portuguese warrior who privately longs to take Heinrich's concubine, the Galician Ouroana. Since Silva must conclude the story with a Portuguese victory, he spends much of his time imagining how they might have conquered the city without the many thousands of Crusaders who helped them--he devises elaborate plans for encirclement and exotic siege tactics, which ultimately allow the Portuguese to overcome the starving Moors and win the day, reuniting Silva's imagined history and the real history.

While writing, Silva develops a romantic interest in Maria Sara; while he initially doubts whether she feels the same and wonders whether she might be married, he soon realizes that she reciprocates and she reveals that she is divorced. The two sometimes draw parallels between their relationship and the fictional relationship of Mogueime and Ouroana. Their debates and dialogues shape Silva's reimagined history.

== Critical reception ==
Kirkus Reviews described the novel as "A brilliantly amusing metafiction about the instability of history and the reality assumed by fiction" and called it Saramago's best work to date. "Saramago moves gracefully between the world of the reinvented past and the unheroic realm in which Raimundo's pleasing fantasies are constantly interrupted by hunger pangs and ringing telephones. The novel embraces a dauntingly broad range of references, juxtaposes past and present tense mischievously, and takes the form of elegantly convoluted long sentences and paragraphs—which, though they demand intense concentration, never descend to obscurity, thanks to Saramago's lucidity and wit"

Reviewing for The New York Times Edmund White wrote: "I found the verbal pierce and parry of the two proofreaders' courtship the most persuasive and vivid aspect of the novel. [...] The rest of the writing can sometimes seem to be nothing but digressions, although the author scatters plenty of clues that he fully intends his periphrases and divagations. At some point he tells us that a story can be 10 words long or 100 or 100,000 -- that every story, in fact, is infinitely extensible. He jokingly refers to his own long-windedness -- which differs from real pomposity in that it is never dull or humorless."

== Attitude to the Reconquista ==
As noted by the Israeli reviewer Noam Levinhof a major theme in the book is Saramago's appreciation of the Reconquista, a central element in the history of Portugal as well as Spain, of which the conquest or re-conquest of Lisbon by Christians and its transformation into the capital of Portugal is a key event.

The protagonist Silva, who can be assumed to at least partially represent Saramago himself in the matter, is very ambiguous in his attitude. On the one hand, he is Portuguese in nationality and - though not very religious – is part of many centuries of Portuguese Christian culture. He is well aware that but for the conquest of Lisbon, Portugal as we know it would never have come into being, and in one passage he states he would not have liked to find himself living "in a city of Moors".

On the other hand, as being a Lisboan born and bred – and specifically, an inhabitant of Lisbon's Old City, which had been the Moorish city and stood the Christian siege – he is very much in sympathy with the Moorish people of Lisbon, who were attacked by what was for them an alien and cruel conquering army, who starved under the siege and were reduced to eating dogs (a point which is repeatedly referred to in the book) and were subjected to a massacre when the city finally fell.

One way of partially reconciling these two opposing attitudes is having the quite sympathetic Portuguese Christian warrior who takes a prominent part in the book bearing an Arabic name – implying that he was himself of Mozarab or Muslim ancestry, and in general that despite the bloody fighting between Christians and Muslims, there was a certain basic continuity of the people inhabiting the Portuguese territory, whatever their religion.

Levinhof compared Saramago's ambiguous attitude to the conquest of Muslim Lisbon and its transformation into a Christian city to the attitude of many Israelis to the conquest of Arab cities during the 1948 Palestine war.
