= Seeing (novel) =

2004 novel by José Saramago

- First edition
- Author: José Saramago
- Original title: Ensaio sobre a Lucidez
- Translator: Margaret Jull Costa
- Language: Portuguese
- Publisher: Editorial Caminho
- Publication date: 2004
- Publication place: Portugal
- English publication date: 2006
- Pages: 307pp
- ISBN: 0-15-101238-5
- OCLC: 62302340
- Dewey Decimal: 869.3/42 22
- LC Class: PQ9281.A66 E7713 2006
- Preceded by: Blindness

Seeing (Portuguese: Ensaio sobre a Lucidez, lit. Essay on Lucidity) is a novel by the Nobel Prize-winning Portuguese author José Saramago. The book was published in Portuguese in 2004 and then in English in 2006. Seeing is the sequel to one of Saramago's most famous works, Blindness.

== Plot summary ==
Seeing is set in the same unnamed country featured in Blindness. The story begins with a parliamentary election, in which the majority (83%) of the populace cast blank ballots. The first half of the story focuses on the struggles of the government and its various nameless members as they try to simultaneously understand and destroy the amorphous non-movement of blank-voters. Some of the characters from Blindness appear in the second half of the novel, including 'the doctor' and 'the doctor's wife', and the 'dog of tears' now with the name, Constant.

== Reception ==
Seeing received generally positive reviews. Writing for The Guardian, Ursula K. Le Guin gave Saramago's Seeing high praise, noting that, "He has written a novel that says more about the days we are living in than any book I have read. He writes with wit, with heartbreaking dignity, and with the simplicity of a great artist in full control of his art. Let us listen to a true elder of our people, a man of tears, a man of wisdom." The Boston Globe wrote, "'Saramago displays the stylistic eccentricities that have become his hallmarks: his punctuation-free prose (only the comma works overtime), his page-long sentences, his clauses within clauses within clauses. But rather than tangle the narrative, these techniques propel it – the next pair of parentheses you encounter will feel heavy, unnecessary." Ultimately, The Globe thought that "Saramago has always pointed us to in lieu of literature's standard endings: the rare beacons of goodness that cut through the murky darkness of mankind. The satisfaction of a Saramago novel, like that of life itself, is rarely a resolution to its central drama; it is the people and moments one enjoys along the way." In a starred review, Kirkus Reviews described the novel as "Very nearly equal to the magnificent Blindness: another invaluable gift from a matchless writer."
