= The Gospel According to Jesus Christ =

1991 novel by José Saramago

- Author: José Saramago
- Original title: O Evangelho Segundo Jesus Cristo
- Translator: Giovanni Pontiero
- Language: Portuguese
- Genre: Historical novels
- Publisher: Caminho
- Publication date: 1991
- Publication place: Portugal
- English publication date: 1994
- Media type: Print (paperback)
- Pages: 396 pages (paperback edition)
- ISBN: 978-0-15-600141-0 (paperback edition)
- OCLC: 30670956
- Dewey Decimal: 869.3/42 20
- LC Class: PQ9281.A66 E913 1994b

The Gospel According to Jesus Christ (original title: O Evangelho Segundo Jesus Cristo, 1991) is a novel by the Portuguese author José Saramago. It is a fictional re-telling of Jesus Christ's life, depicting him as a flawed, humanised character with passions and doubts. The novel proved controversial, especially to representatives of the Roman Catholic Church, with the Vatican newspaper L'Osservatore Romano accusing Saramago of having a "substantially anti-religious vision". It was praised by other critics as a "deeply philosophical, provocative and compelling work". After the conservative Portuguese government blocked the book's nomination for the European Literary Prize, Saramago left his homeland and lived out his days in Lanzarote, in the eastern Canary Islands.

== Plot introduction ==
This book re-imagines the life of Jesus Christ, using the events depicted in the canonical gospels as a scaffold on which to construct its story. It does not follow the chronology of the life of Jesus Christ found in the New Testament. It places far greater emphasis on the earlier part of Jesus's life than the canonical gospels do.

== Plot summary ==
The book begins with Jesus's conception by Mary and Joseph, in the spiritual presence of God. Jesus's birth is heralded by a mysterious character, who claims to be an angel. Later, at Bethlehem, Jesus is born in a cave, and three shepherds – including the "angel" – arrive to bring him presents.

As described in the Gospel of Matthew, Herod the Great receives a premonition of the birth of the "King of the Jews" (in the biblical account of Matthew, he is informed by the Magi; in the book, however, he is visited in his dreams by the prophet Micah). He orders the Massacre of the Innocents. Jesus survives, but his father, Joseph, who has learned of the plan, neglects to warn the other families in the village, ensuring that his son is safe first, and is plagued by nightmares for the rest of his life.

First edition Cover (Portuguese)

Later, when Jesus turns thirteen, Joseph is crucified by the Romans who mistakenly think him to be a Zealot fighter. From the night of his father's death, Jesus inherits his nightmare. He learns about the massacre from his mother, and grows aloof from his family, amongst whom he can no longer live peacefully. He leaves the family and Nazareth and makes his way to Jerusalem, where he visits the Temple, thence to Bethlehem.

He works as an apprentice to a shepherd (called The Shepherd who is understood to be the devil and the mysterious "angel" mentioned earlier). The Shepherd instructs Jesus in the ways of hedonism, and at one point tries to persuade Jesus to use the sheep for sexual release. Eventually, he meets God in the desert. God forces Jesus to sacrifice his favorite sheep, and says he has a design for him. Upon hearing of this, the Shepherd tells him to leave immediately. Jesus makes his way back home through the Sea of Galilee where he discovers an amazing talent to catch myriads of fish, and Magdala where he meets and falls in love with Mary Magdalene, then continues back home to Nazareth.

Jesus is not believed by his family, and so he leaves them once again, meets Mary Magdalene, and goes to work helping the fishermen on the Sea of Galilee. One day out on the Sea by himself, he is visited by God and the devil. God tells Jesus of his plan for Jesus to institute Christianity, because God is annoyed at being only the God of one race, and that other gods seem to get all the glory. Jesus is initially against what he sees as a selfish plan bound to lead to great suffering of many, but is made to see that he actually has no choice in the matter.

Jesus becomes a prophet of God, continuing to work miracles but also preaching. He gets himself arrested, repeatedly calling himself King of the Jews. Having heard news of John the Baptist, who was put to death not for preaching the coming of the Messiah but allegedly for disapproving of King Herod's incestuous marriage, Jesus decides that his own death could likewise obscure his divine nature and thus thwart God's plan.

The novel ends with Jesus's realization that God's plan, and the ensuing centuries of torture, slaughter, and misery that Christianity will bring, will proceed despite his efforts. His last words from the cross, in referring to God, are "Men, forgive Him, for He knows not what He has done."

== Critical reception ==
Harold Bloom wrote: "As Saramago’s fierce critical admirer, I am reluctant to choose it over all his other novels, but it is an awesome work, imaginatively superior to any other life of Jesus, including the four canonical Gospels. It loses some aspects of irony in Giovanni Pontiero’s fine translation, but more than enough survives to overcome the aware reader. Saramago’s audacity is triumphant in his Gospel".

== Release details ==
- Hardback, 1994: ISBN 978-0-15-136700-9
- Paperback, 1994: ISBN 978-0-15-600141-0
- Paperback, 1999: ISBN 978-1-86046-684-7

== See also ==
- The Last Temptation of Christ - novel from 1955 by Nikos Kazantzakis
- The Master and Margarita - novel from 1967 by Mikhail Bulgakov
