= The Tale of the Unknown Island =

1997 short story by José Saramago

"The Tale of the Uncharted Island"
- First edition
- Author: José Saramago
- Original title: O Conto da Ilha Desconhecida
- Translator: Margaret Jull Costa
- Illustrator: Bartolomeu Dos Santos
- Language: Portuguese
- Genre: Short story
- Publisher: Assirio & Alvim (Portugal); The Harvill Press (UK); Harcourt Brace (US)
- Publication date: 1997
- Publication place: Portugal
- English publication date: November 1999
- Media type: Print
- Pages: 42 pp

"The Tale of the Unknown Island" (Portuguese: O conto da ilha desconhecida) is a short story by Portuguese author José Saramago. It was published in Portuguese in 1997, and in English translation by Margaret Jull Costa in 1999.

== Plot ==
A man requests the king of his country to give him a boat so he can go in search for "the unknown island". The king questions him about the existence of such an island and tries to convince the man that all islands already appear on maps. The man states that only the known islands do. This debate concludes with the king granting him a boat.

== Adaptation ==
An adaptation was staged at the Gate Theatre, Notting Hill in September/October 2017.
