= The Stone Raft =

Novel by José Saramago

- First edition
- Author: José Saramago
- Original title: A Jangada de Pedra
- Language: Portuguese
- Publisher: Caminho (Portugal); Harcourt Brace (US)
- Publication date: 1986
- Publication place: Portugal
- English publication date: 1994
- Media type: Print (Hardback & Paperback)
- ISBN: 0-15-185198-0
- OCLC: 31865403
- Dewey Decimal: 869.3/42 20
- LC Class: PQ9281.A66 J313 1995

The Stone Raft (Portuguese: A Jangada de Pedra) is a novel by Portuguese writer José Saramago. It was written in 1986, and was translated into English by Giovanni Pontiero in 1994. The premise of the novel is that the Iberian Peninsula has broken off the European continent and is floating freely in the Atlantic Ocean; bureaucrats around the world are forced to deal with the traumatic effects, while five characters from across Portugal and Spain are drawn ever closer to one another, embarking on a journey within the peninsula as the landmass journeys itself.

A Spanish-language film version titled La balsa de piedra was released in 2002. A Dutch, Spanish and Portuguese co-production, it was directed by Dutch director George Sluizer.

In 2021 it came to light that many lyrics of singer-songwriter Noel Gallagher of Oasis bear a strong resemblance to various lines from the novel, leading fans to believe that the book may have served as a device of lyrical inspiration throughout his songwriting career, in particular in the 1996 song "Underneath the Sky".
