= Memories of My Youth =

2006 book by José Saramago

First edition (publ. Caminho)

Memories of my Youth (Small Memories) is an autobiography by Nobel Prize-winning author José Saramago. It was first published in 2006.

A memoir of Saramago's childhood in Portugal that moves between Lisbon and Azinhaga, the village where he was born in 1922 and first moved away from when he was 18 months old.

Aimee Shalan of The Guardian wrote that the book was "Masterfully written and wonderfully evocative...None of his memories are especially dramatic, but they resonate with wry humour and acute engagement with the everyday."
