= José Saramago =

Portuguese novelist (1922–2010)

José Saramago GColSE GColCa
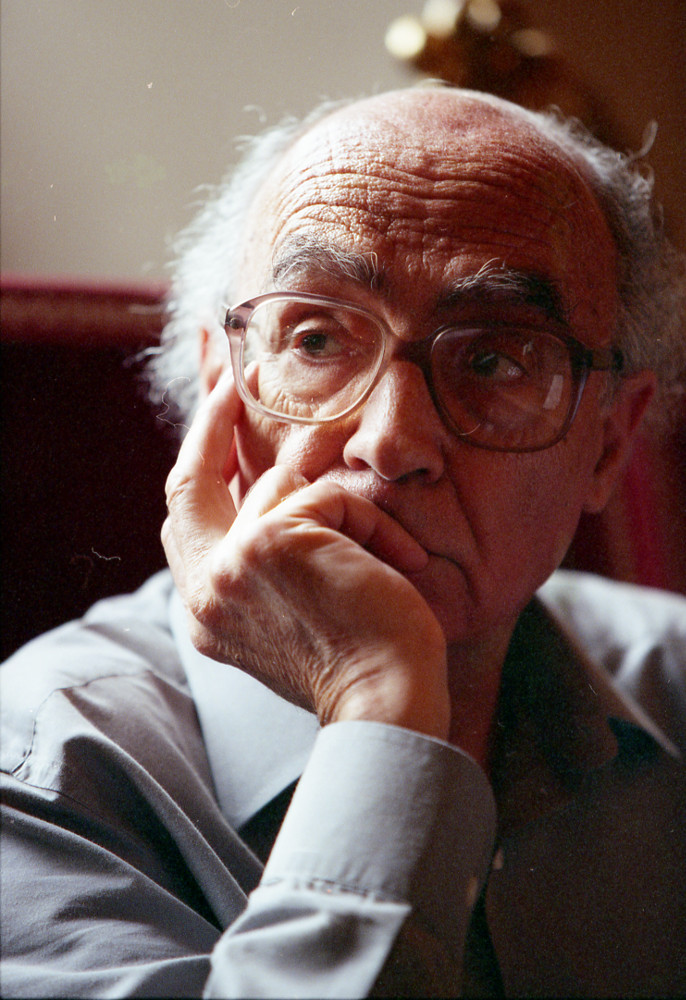
- Saramago in 1999
- Born: José de Sousa Saramago; 16 November 1922; Azinhaga, Santarém, Portugal
- Died: 18 June 2010 (aged 87); Tías, Canary Islands, Spain
- Occupation: Writer
- Spouses: Ilda Reis (m. 1944; div. 1970) Pilar del Río (m. 1988)
- Partner: Isabel da Nóbrega (1968–1986)
- Children: 1
- Writing career
- Period: 1947–2010
- Notable works: Baltasar and Blimunda (1982); The Year of the Death of Ricardo Reis (1984); The Gospel According to Jesus Christ (1991); Blindness (1995); All the Names (1997); The Double (2002); Death with Interruptions (2005); Cain (2009)
- Notable awards: Camões Prize (1995); Nobel Prize in Literature (1998)
- Website: www.josesaramago.org

Signature
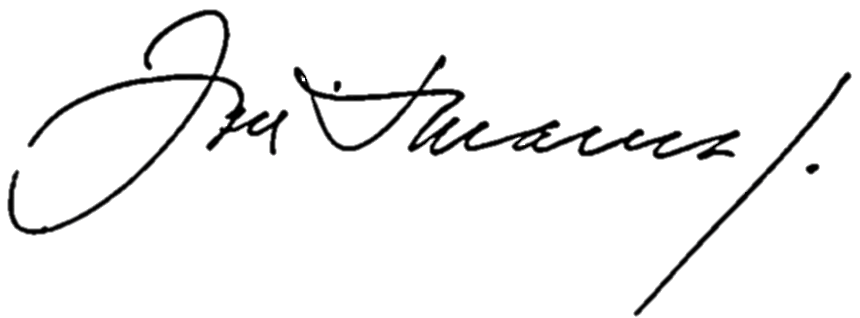

José de Sousa Saramago (European Portuguese: [ʒuˈzɛ ðɨ ˈso(w)zɐ sɐɾɐˈmaɣu]; 16 November 1922 – 18 June 2010) was a Portuguese writer. He was the recipient of the 1998 Nobel Prize in Literature for his "parables sustained by imagination, compassion and irony [with which he] continually enables us once again to apprehend an elusory reality." His works, some of which can be seen as allegories, commonly present subversive perspectives on historic events, emphasizing the theopoetic human factor.

In 2003 Harold Bloom described Saramago as "the most gifted novelist alive in the world today" and in 2010 said he considers Saramago to be "a permanent part of the Western canon", while James Wood praises "the distinctive tone to his fiction because he narrates his novels as if he were someone both wise and ignorant."

More than two million copies of Saramago's books have been sold in Portugal alone and his work has been translated into 25 languages. A proponent of libertarian communism, Saramago criticized institutions such as the Catholic Church, the European Union and the International Monetary Fund. An atheist, he defended love as an instrument to improve the human condition. In 1992, the Government of Portugal under Prime Minister Aníbal Cavaco Silva ordered the removal of one of his works, The Gospel According to Jesus Christ, from the Aristeion Prize's shortlist, claiming the work was religiously offensive. Feeling disheartened by what he perceived as political censorship of his work, Saramago went into exile on the Spanish island of Lanzarote, where he lived alongside his Spanish wife Pilar del Río until his death in 2010.

Saramago was a founding member of the National Front for the Defense of Culture in Lisbon in 1992. In 2007, Saramago founded his namesake foundation, José Saramago Foundation. Its institutional principles are to defend and spread the Universal Declaration of Human Rights, the promotion of culture in Portugal as well as in all countries, and particular concerns about environmentalism.

== Biography ==
=== Early and middle life ===
Saramago was born in 1922 into a family of very poor landless peasants in Azinhaga, Portugal, a small village in Ribatejo Province, some one hundred kilometres northeast of Lisbon. His parents were José de Sousa and Maria da Piedade. "Saramago", the Portuguese word for Raphanus raphanistrum (wild radish), was the insulting nickname given to his father, and was accidentally incorporated into his name by the village clerk upon registration of his birth.

In 1924, Saramago’s family relocated to Lisbon, where his father began working as a police officer. Several months after the move, his older brother Francisco died at the age of four. He spent his vacations at his grandparents' home in Azinhaga. When his grandfather suffered a stroke and was to be taken to Lisbon for treatment, Saramago recalled, "He went out into the yard of his house, where there were a few trees, fig-trees, olive trees. And he went one by one, embracing the trees and crying, saying goodbye to them because he knew he would not return. To see this, to live this, if that doesn't mark you for the rest of your life," Saramago said, "you have no feeling." Although Saramago was a good pupil, his parents were unable to afford to keep him in grammar school, and instead moved him to a technical school at age 12.

After graduating as a lathe operator, he worked as a car mechanic for two years. He had since acquired a taste for reading and had begun to frequent a public library in Lisbon in his free time. In 1944, he married Ilda Reis, a typist who later embarked on an artistic career. Their only daughter, Violante, would be born three years later, in 1947. That same year he published his first novel, originally titled A Viúva (The Widow) but later changed to Terra do Pecado (Land of Sin), a book he would later, as a mature novelist, disavow as juvenile and heavily indebted to the books he had read in his youth rather than grounded in his personal experience. By this time, he was working as a civil servant at the Social Welfare Service, later finding work as an editor and a translator at a publishing company, Estúdios Cor, and then as a journalist. In 1970, he divorced his first wife. Two years prior, he had met and become romantically involved with the writer Isabel da Nóbrega, the longtime partner of author and critic João Gaspar Simões. Nóbrega became Saramago's devoted literary mentor, and the woman to whom he would later dedicate Memorial do Convento and O Ano da Morte de Ricardo Reis.

After the democratic revolution in 1974, on 9 April 1975, during the rule of Vasco Gonçalves, Saramago became the assistant director of the newspaper Diário de Notícias, and the editorial line became clearly pro-communist. A group of 30 journalists – half the editorial staff – handed the board a petition calling for the editorial line to be revised and for it to be published. A plenary was called and, following an angry intervention by Saramago, 24 journalists were expelled, accused of being right-wingers. After the Coup of 25 November 1975 that put an end to the communist PREC, Saramago, in turn, was fired from the newspaper.

Land of Sin remained Saramago's only published literary work until a poetry book, Possible Poems, appeared in 1966, followed by another collection of poems, Probably Joy, in 1970, three collections of newspaper articles in 1971, 1973 and 1974 respectively, and the long poem The Year of 1993, in 1975. A collection of political writing was published in 1976 under the title Notes. After his dismissal from Diário de Notícias in 1975, Saramago embraced his writing more seriously and in the following years published a series of important works that would herald his style and literary preoccupations, including Manual de Pintura e Caligrafia (1977), Objecto Quase (1978), Levantado do Chão (1980) and Viagem a Portugal (1981).

=== Later life and international acclaim ===
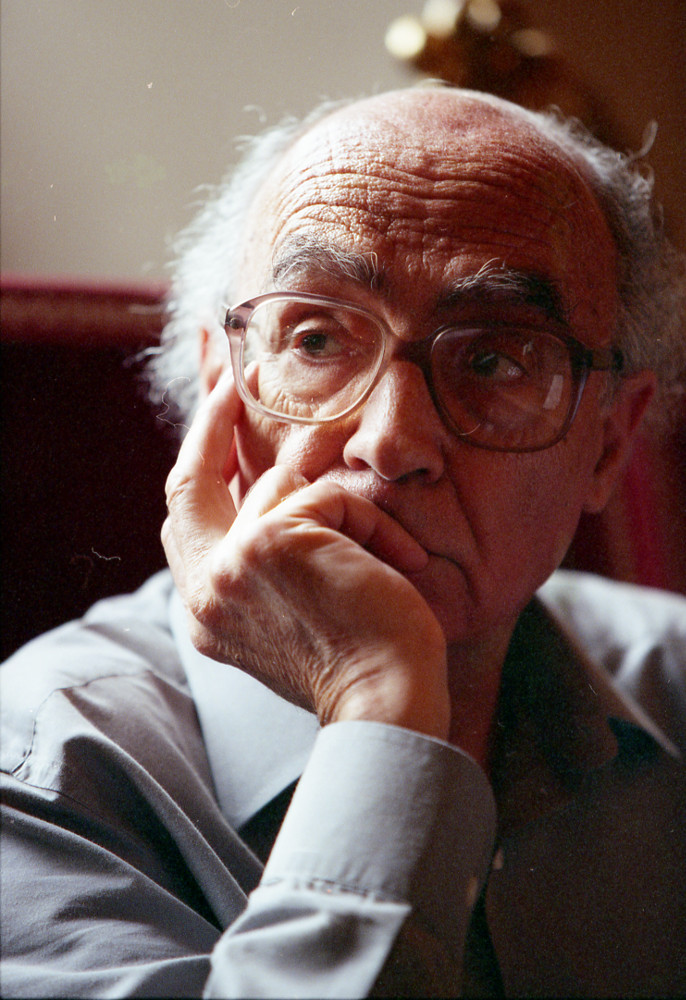
José Saramago in 1999.

Saramago did not achieve widespread recognition and acclaim until he was sixty, with the publication of his fourth novel, Memorial do Convento (1982). A baroque tale set during the Inquisition in 18th-century Lisbon, it tells of the love between a maimed soldier and a young clairvoyant, and of a renegade priest's heretical dream of flight. The novel's translation in 1988 as Baltasar and Blimunda (by Giovanni Pontiero) brought Saramago to the attention of an international readership. This novel won the Portuguese PEN Club Award.

Following acclaimed novels such as The Year of the Death of Ricardo Reis and The History of the Siege of Lisbon, Saramago was hailed by literary critics for his complex yet elegant style, his broad range of references and his wit.

For the former novel, Saramago received the British Independent Foreign Fiction Prize. The multilayered The History of the Siege of Lisbon deals with the uncertainty of historical events and includes the story of a middle-aged isolated proofreader who falls in love with his boss. Saramago acknowledged that there is a lot of himself in the protagonist of the novel, and dedicated the novel to his wife.

In 1986 Saramago met a Spanish intellectual and journalist, Pilar del Río, 27 years his junior, and he promptly ended his relationship with Isabel Nóbrega, his partner since 1968. They married in 1988 and remained together until his death in June 2010. Del Río is the official translator of Saramago's books into Spanish.

Saramago joined the Portuguese Communist Party in 1969 and remained a member until the end of his life. He was a self-confessed pessimist. His views aroused considerable controversy in Portugal, especially after the publication of The Gospel According to Jesus Christ. Members of the country's Catholic community were outraged by Saramago's representation of Jesus and particularly God as fallible, even cruel human beings. Portugal's social-democratic government, led by then-prime minister Aníbal Cavaco Silva, did not allow Saramago's work to compete for the Aristeion Prize, arguing that it offended the Catholic community. As a result, Saramago and his wife moved to Lanzarote, an island in the Canaries.

In 1998 Saramago was awarded the Nobel Prize in Literature with the prize notation: "who with parables sustained by imagination, compassion and irony continually enables us once again to apprehend an elusory reality."

Saramago was expected to speak as the guest of honour at the European Writers' Parliament in 2010, which was convened in Istanbul following a proposal he had co-authored. However, Saramago died before the event took place.

=== Death and funeral ===
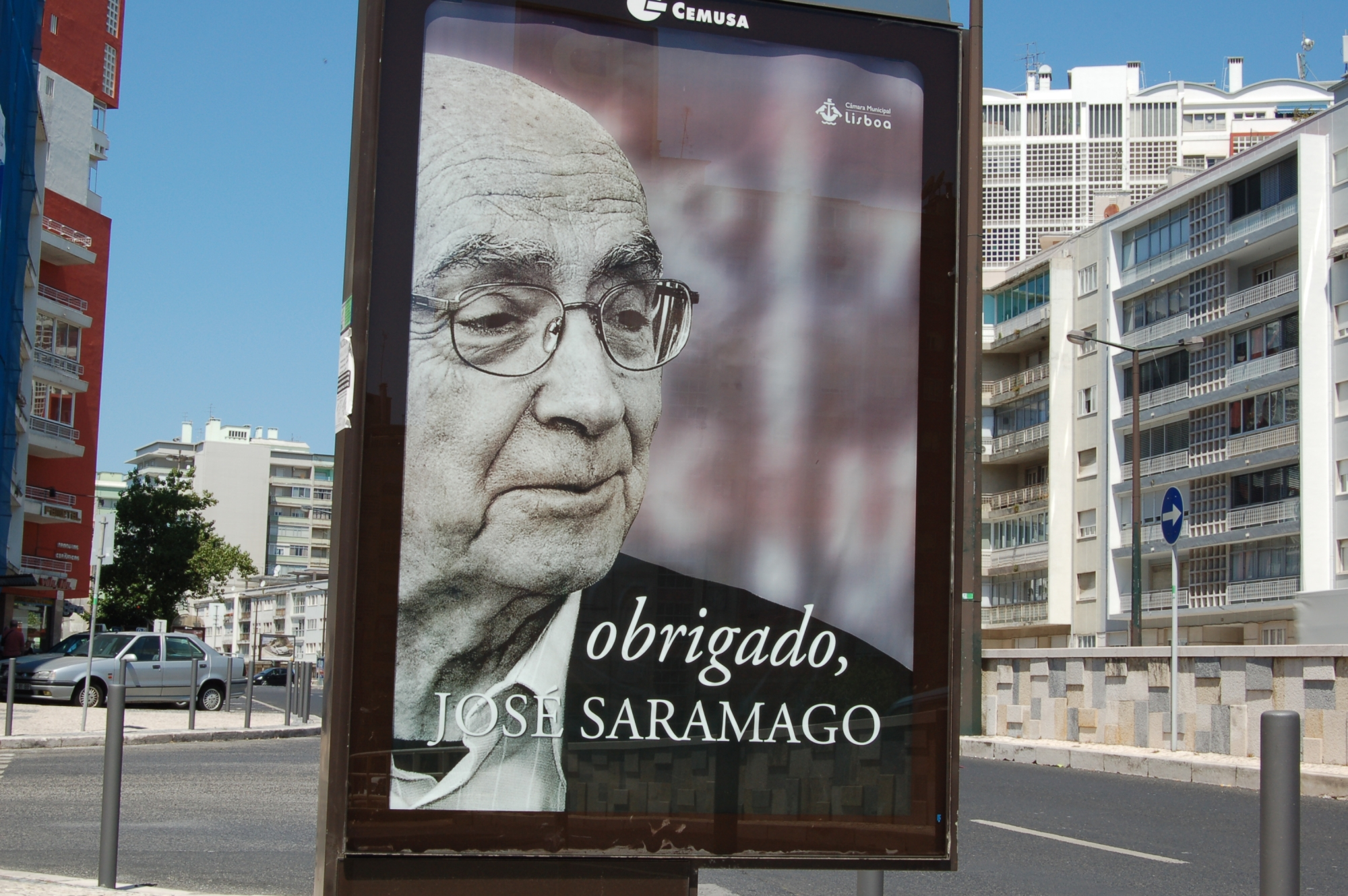
"Thank you José Saramago", Lisbon, October 2010

Saramago suffered from leukemia. He died on 18 June 2010, aged 87, having spent the last few years of his life in Lanzarote, Spain. His family said that he had breakfast and chatted with his wife and translator Pilar del Río on Friday morning, after which he started feeling unwell and died. The Guardian described him as "the finest Portuguese writer of his generation", while Fernanda Eberstadt of The New York Times said he was "known almost as much for his unfaltering Communism as for his fiction".

Saramago's English language translator, Margaret Jull Costa, paid tribute to his "wonderful imagination," calling him "the greatest contemporary Portuguese writer". Saramago continued his writing until his death. His most recent publication, Claraboia, was published posthumously in 2011. Saramago had suffered from pneumonia a year before his death. Assuming a full recovery, he was set to appear at the Edinburgh International Book Festival in August 2010.

Portugal declared two days of mourning. There were tributes from senior international politicians: Luiz Inácio Lula da Silva (Brazil), Bernard Kouchner (France) and José Luis Rodríguez Zapatero (Spain), while Cuba's Raúl and Fidel Castro sent flowers.

Saramago's funeral was held in Lisbon on 20 June 2010, in the presence of more than 20,000 people, many of whom had travelled hundreds of kilometres, but also notably in the absence of right-wing President of Portugal Aníbal Cavaco Silva, who was holidaying in the Azores as the ceremony took place. Cavaco Silva, the Prime Minister who removed Saramago's work from the shortlist of the Aristeion Prize, said he did not attend Saramago's funeral because he "had never had the privilege to know him". In an official press release, Cavaco Silva claimed having paid homage to the literary work of Saramago. Mourners, who questioned Cavaco Silva's absence in the presence of reporters, held copies of the red carnation, symbolic of Portugal's democratic revolution. Saramago's cremation took place in Lisbon, and his ashes were buried on the anniversary of his death, 18 June 2011, underneath a hundred-year-old olive tree on the square in front of the José Saramago Foundation (Casa dos Bicos).

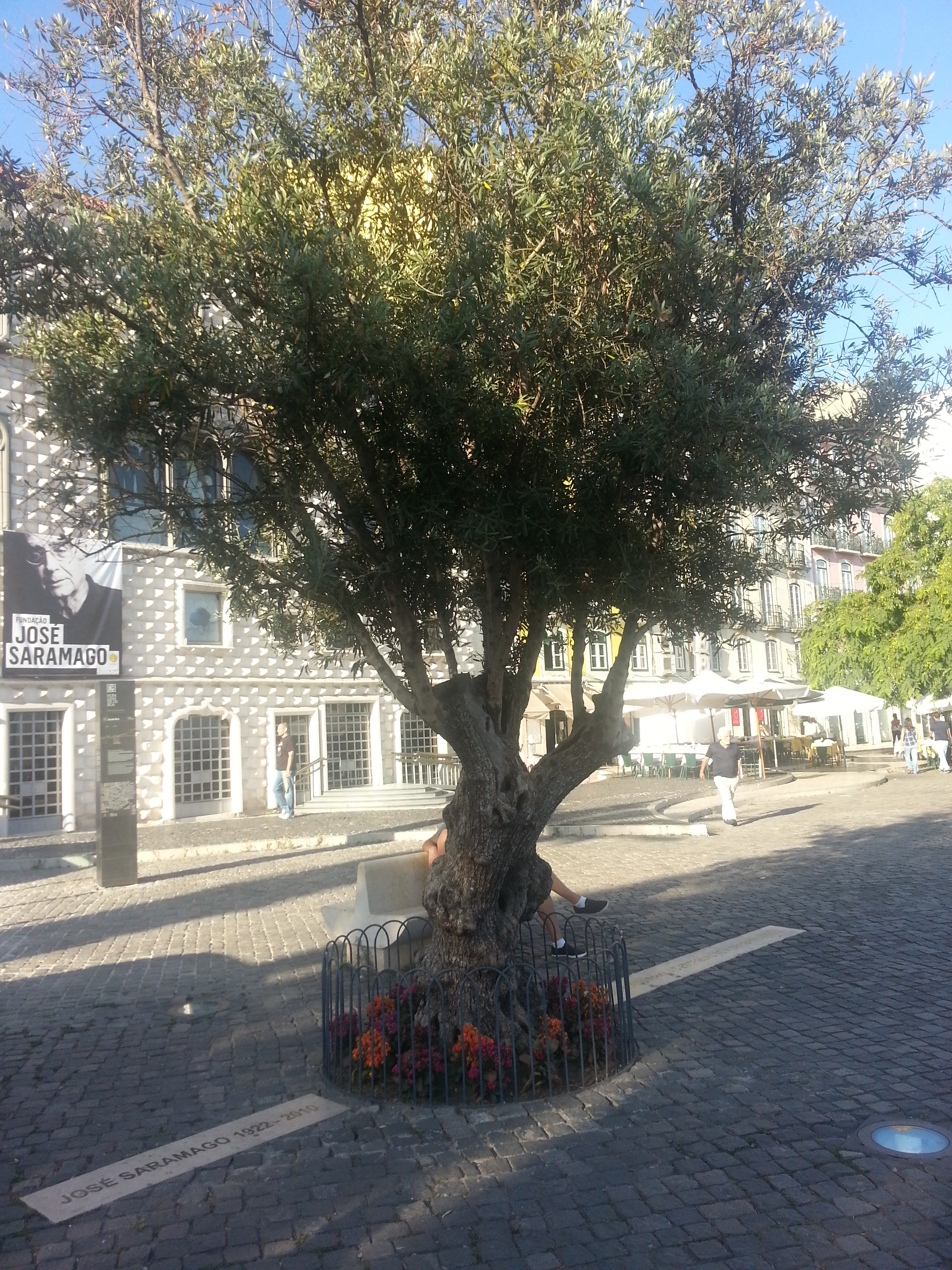
Burial place of José Saramago's ashes.

== Lost novel ==
The José Saramago Foundation announced in October 2011 the publication of a "lost novel" published as Skylight (Claraboia in Portuguese). It was written in the 1950s and remained in the archive of a publisher to whom the manuscript had been sent. Saramago remained silent about the work up to his death. The book has been translated into several languages.

== Style and themes ==
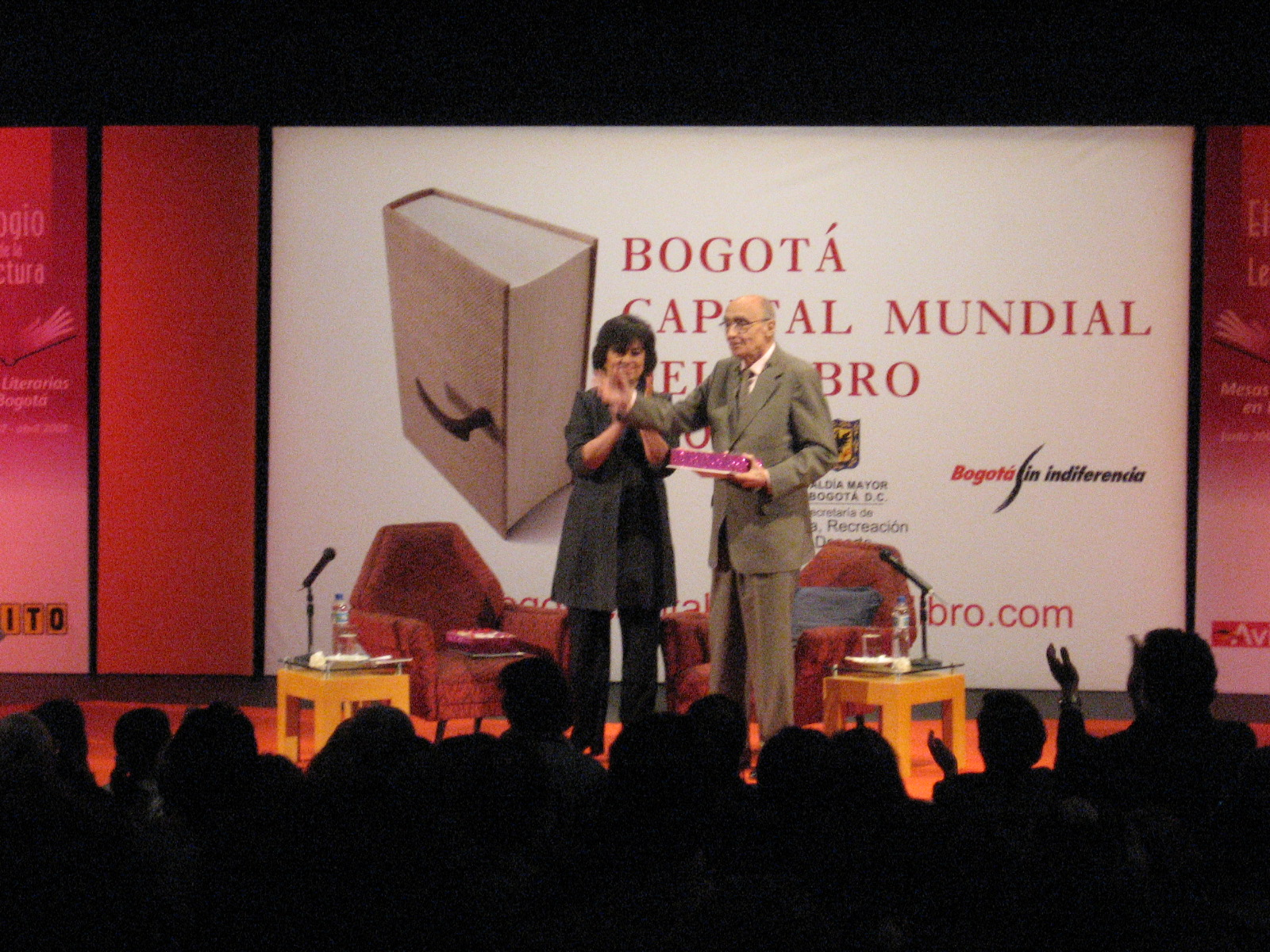
Saramago at the Teatro Jorge Eliécer Gaitán in Bogotá in 2007

Saramago's experimental style often features long sentences, at times more than a page long. He used full stops sparingly, choosing instead a loose flow of clauses joined by commas. Many of his paragraphs extend for pages without pausing for dialogue (which Saramago chooses not to delimit by quotation marks); when the speaker changes, Saramago capitalizes the first letter of the new speaker's clause. His works often refer to his other works. In his novel Blindness, Saramago completely abandons the use of proper nouns, instead referring to characters simply by some unique characteristic, an example of his style reflecting the recurring themes of identity and meaning found throughout his work.

Saramago's novels often deal with fantastic scenarios. In his 1986 novel The Stone Raft, the Iberian Peninsula breaks off from the rest of Europe and sails around the Atlantic Ocean. In his 1995 novel Blindness, an entire unnamed country is stricken with a mysterious plague of "white blindness". In his 1984 novel The Year of the Death of Ricardo Reis (which won the PEN Award and the Independent Foreign Fiction Award), Fernando Pessoa's heteronym survives for a year after the poet himself dies. Additionally, his novel Death with Interruptions (also translated as Death at Intervals) takes place in a country in which, suddenly, nobody dies, and concerns, in part, the spiritual and political implications of the event, although the book ultimately moves from a synoptic to a more personal perspective.

Saramago addresses serious matters with empathy for the human condition and for the isolation of contemporary urban life. His characters struggle with their need to connect with one another, form relations and bond as a community, and also with their need for individuality, and to find meaning and dignity outside of political and economic structures.

When asked to describe his daily writing routine in 2009, Saramago responded, "I write two pages. And then I read and read and read."

== Personal life ==
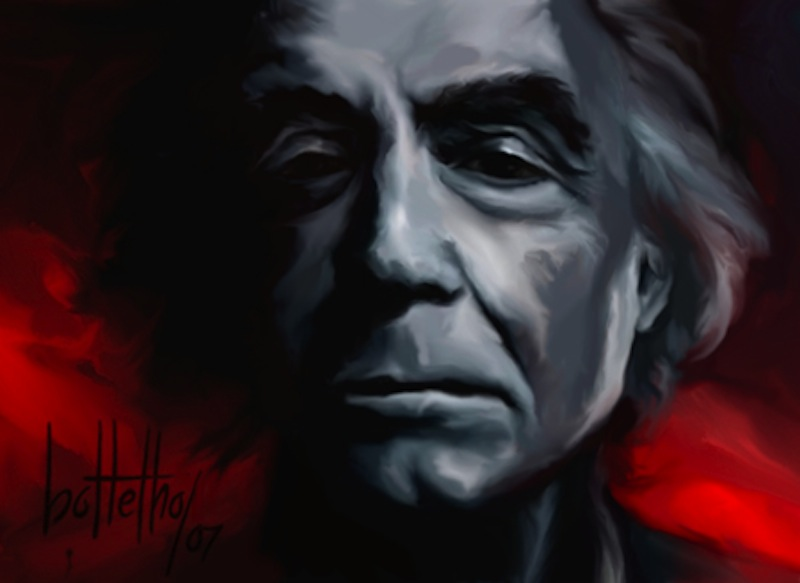
Saramago by Portuguese painter Carlos Botelho

Saramago was an atheist. The Catholic Church criticised him on numerous occasions due to the content of some of his novels, mainly The Gospel According to Jesus Christ and Cain, in which he uses satire and biblical quotations to present the figure of God in a comical way.

The Portuguese government lambasted his 1991 novel O Evangelho Segundo Jesus Cristo (The Gospel according to Jesus Christ) and struck the writer's name from nominees for the European Literature Prize, saying the atheist work offended Portuguese Catholic convictions.

The book portrays a Christ who, subject to human desires, lives with Mary Magdalene and tries to back out of the crucifixion. Following the Swedish Academy's decision to present Saramago with the Nobel Prize in Literature, the Vatican questioned the decision on political grounds, though gave no comment on the aesthetic or literary components of Saramago's work. Saramago responded: "The Vatican is easily scandalized, especially by people from outside. They should just focus on their prayers and leave people in peace. I respect those who believe, but I have no respect for the institution."

Saramago was a member of the Communist Party of Portugal, and in his late years defined himself as a proponent of libertarian communism.

He ran in the 1989 Lisbon local election as part of the "Coalition For Lisbon," and was elected alderman presiding officer of the Municipal Assembly of Lisbon. Saramago was also a candidate of the Democratic Unity Coalition in all elections of the European Parliament from 1989 to 2009, though he ran for positions of which it was thought he had no possibility of winning. He was a critic of European Union (EU) and International Monetary Fund (IMF) policies.

Many of his novels are acknowledged as political satire of a subtle kind. In The Notebook, a collection of blog entries from September 2008 to August 2009, Saramago's political convictions are made the most clear. According to The Independent, "Saramago aims to cut through the web of 'organized lies' surrounding humanity, and to convince readers by delivering his opinions in a relentless series of unadorned, knock-down prose blows." His political engagement has led to comparisons with George Orwell.

When speaking to The Observer in 2006, Saramago said he "believe[s] that we all have some influence, not because of the fact that one is an artist, but because we are citizens. As citizens, we all have an obligation to intervene and become involved, it's the citizen who changes things. I can't imagine myself outside any kind of social or political involvement."

During the Second Intifada, while visiting Ramallah in March 2002, Saramago said that "what is happening in Palestine is a crime we can put on the same plane as what happened at Auschwitz ... A sense of impunity characterises the Israeli people and its army. They have turned into rentiers of the Holocaust." In an essay he wrote expanding on his views, Saramago wrote of Jews: "educated and trained in the idea that any suffering that has been inflicted . . . on everyone else . . . will always be inferior to that which they themselves suffered in the Holocaust, the Jews endlessly scratch their own wound to keep it bleeding, to make it incurable, and they show it to the world as if it were a banner." Critics of these statements charged that they were antisemitic. Six months later, Saramago clarified. "To have said that Israel's action is to be condemned, that war crimes are being perpetrated – really the Israelis are used to that. It doesn't bother them. But there are certain words they can't stand. And to say 'Auschwitz' there ... note well, I didn't say that Ramallah was the same as Auschwitz, that would be stupid. What I said was that the spirit of Auschwitz was present in Ramallah. We were eight writers. They all made condemning statements, Wole Soyinka, Breyten Breytenbach, Vincenzo Consolo and others. But the Israelis weren't bothered about those. It was the fact that I put my finger in the Auschwitz wound that made them jump."

During the 2006 Lebanon War, Saramago joined Tariq Ali, John Berger, Noam Chomsky, and others in condemning what they characterized as "a long-term military, economic and geographic practice whose political aim is nothing less than the liquidation of the Palestinian nation".

He was also a supporter of Iberian Federalism. In a 2008 press conference for the filming of Blindness he asked, in reference to the Great Recession, "Where was all that money poured on markets? Very tight and well kept; then suddenly it appears to save what? lives? no, banks." He added, "Marx was never so right as now", and predicted "the worst is still to come."

== Awards and accolades ==
- 1995: Camões Prize
- 1998: Nobel Prize in Literature
- 2004: America Award
- 2009: São Paulo Prize for Literature — Shortlisted in the Best Book of the Year category for A Viagem do Elefante

=== Nobel Prize in Literature ===
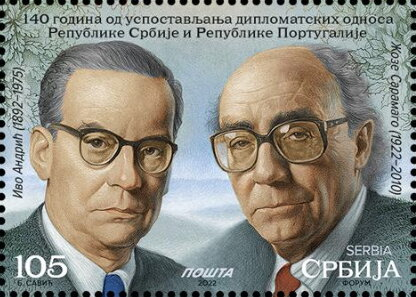
José Saramago (right) and the 1961 Nobel Prize in Literature laureate Ivo Andrić pictured on a 2022 Serbian stamp.

The Swedish Academy selected Saramago as the 1998 recipient of the Nobel Prize for Literature. The announcement came when he was about to fly out of Germany after the Frankfurt Book Fair, and caught both him and his editor by surprise. The Nobel committee praised his "parables sustained by imagination, compassion and irony", and his "modern skepticism" about official truths. The choice of Saramago was generally well received internationally, but was heavily criticized by the bourgeois press in his home country and also by the Vatican City who questioned the decision on political grounds and called it "yet another ideologically slanted award."

At the award ceremony in Stockholm on 10 December 1998, Kjell Espmark of the Swedish Academy described Saramago's writing as:

literature characterised at one and the same time by sagacious reflection and by insight into the limitations of sagacity, by the fantastic and by precise realism, by cautious empathy and by critical acuity, by warmth and by irony. This is Saramago’s unique amalgam.

In 2024, Saramago's widow Pilar del Rio and the José Saramago Foundation donated a number of Saramago's belongings to the Nobel Prize Museum in Stockholm, including a pair of his glasses, a stone found in Lanzarote he kept at his home, and a manuscript written in his youth.

=== Decorations ===
- Grand Collar of the Military Order of Saint James of the Sword, Portugal (3 December 1998)
- Commander of the Military Order of Saint James of the Sword, Portugal (24 August 1985)
- Grand Collar of the Order of Camões, Portugal (16 November 2021)

== The José Saramago Foundation ==
The José Saramago Foundation was founded by José Saramago in June 2007, with the aim to defend and spread the Universal Declaration of Human Rights, the promotion of culture in Portugal just like in all the countries, and protection of the environment. The José Saramago Foundation is located in the historic Casa dos Bicos in the city of Lisbon.

== List of works ==
Title	Year	English title	Year	ISBN
Terra do Pecado	1947	Land of Sin		ISBN 972-21-1145-0
Os Poemas Possíveis	1966	Possible Poems		
Provavelmente Alegria	1970	Probably Joy		
Deste Mundo e do Outro	1971	This World and the Other		
A Bagagem do Viajante	1973	The Traveller's Baggage		
O Embargo	1973	The Embargo		
As Opiniões que o DL teve	1974	Opinions That DL Had		
O Ano de 1993	1975	The Year of 1993		
Os Apontamentos	1976	The Notes		
Manual de Pintura e Caligrafia	1977	Manual of Painting and Calligraphy	1993	ISBN 1-85754-043-3
Objecto Quase	1978	The Lives of Things	2012	ISBN 9781781680865
A Noite (Teatro)	1979	The Night		
Levantado do Chão	1980	Raised from the Ground	2012	ISBN 9780099531777
Que Farei Com Este Livro? (Teatro)	1980	What Will I Do With This Book?		
Viagem a Portugal	1981	Journey to Portugal	2000	ISBN 0-15-100587-7
Memorial do Convento	1982	Baltasar and Blimunda	1987	ISBN 0-15-110555-3
O Ano da Morte de Ricardo Reis	1984	The Year of the Death of Ricardo Reis	1991	ISBN 0-15-199735-7
A Jangada de Pedra	1986	The Stone Raft	1994	ISBN 0-15-185198-0
A Segunda Vida de Francisco de Assis (Teatro)	1987	The Second Life of Francisco de Assis		
História do Cerco de Lisboa	1989	The History of the Siege of Lisbon	1996	ISBN 0-15-100238-X
O Evangelho Segundo Jesus Cristo	1991	The Gospel According to Jesus Christ	1993	ISBN 0-15-136700-0
In Nomine Dei (Teatro)	1993	In Nomine Dei	1993	ISBN 9788571643284
Cadernos de Lanzarote - Diário-I	1994	Lanzarote Notebooks - Diary I		ISBN 9722109014
Ensaio sobre a Cegueira	1995	Blindness	1997	ISBN 0-15-100251-7
Cadernos de Lanzarote - Diário-IV	1997	Lanzarote Notebooks - Diary IV		ISBN 9722111140
Todos os Nomes	1997	All the Names	1999	ISBN 0-15-100421-8
O Conto da Ilha Desconhecida	1997	The Tale of the Unknown Island	1999	ISBN 0-15-100595-8
Folhas Políticas 1976-1998	1999	Political Pages		ISBN 9722113038
A Caverna	2000	The Cave	2002	ISBN 0-15-100414-5
A Maior Flor do Mundo	2001	The Biggest Flower in The World		
O Homem Duplicado	2002	The Double	2004	ISBN 0-15-101040-4
Ensaio sobre a Lucidez	2004	Seeing	2006	ISBN 0-15-101238-5
Don Giovanni ou O Dissoluto Absolvido	2005	Don Giovanni, or, Dissolute Acquitted		
As Intermitências da Morte	2005	Death with Interruptions	2008	ISBN 1-84655-020-3
As Pequenas Memórias	2006	Small Memories	2010	ISBN 978-0-15-101508-5
A Viagem do Elefante	2008	The Elephant's Journey	2010	ISBN 978-972-21-2017-3
Caim	2009	Cain	2011	ISBN 978-607-11-0316-1
Claraboia	2011	Skylight	2014	ISBN 9780544570375
O Silêncio da Água	2011	The Silence of Water	2023	ISBN 9781644213124
Alabardas, alabardas, Espingardas, espingardas	2014	Halberds, halberds, Shotguns, shotguns		ISBN 9789720046956
O Lagarto	2016	The Lizard	2019	ISBN 9781609809331
Último Caderno de Lanzarote	2018	Last Lanzarote Notebook		ISBN 9789720031280
Uma Luz Inesperada	2022	An Unexpected Light	2024	ISBN 9781644213407

== See also ==
- José Saramago Foundation
- José Saramago Prize
