= Oxford-Weidenfeld Translation Prize =

- Awarded for: A book-length translation into English from any other living European language
- Sponsored by: George Weidenfeld, Baron Weidenfeld and the University of Oxford
- Country: England
- Hosted by: St Anne's College, Oxford
- First award: 1999
- Final award: Active
- Website: http://www.queens.ox.ac.uk/oxford-weidenfeld-prize

The Oxford-Weidenfeld Translation Prize is an annual literary prize for any book-length translation into English from any other living European language. The first prize was awarded in 1999. The prize is funded by and named in honour of George Weidenfeld, Baron Weidenfeld and by New College, The Queen's College and St Anne's College, Oxford.

== Winners ==
Year	Translator	Source work			Publisher
Year	Translator	Author	Title	Language	Publisher
1999	Jonathan Galassi	Eugenio Montale	Collected Poems	Italian	Carcanet Press
2000	Margaret Jull Costa	José Saramago	All the Names	Portuguese	Harvill Press
2001	Edwin Morgan	Jean Racine	Phèdre	French	Carcanet Press
2002	Patrick Thursfield and Katalin Banffy-Jelen	Miklós Bánffy	They Were Divided	Hungarian	Arcadia Books
2003	Ciaran Carson	Dante Alighieri	Inferno	Italian	Granta
2004	Michael Hofmann	Ernst Jünger	Storm of Steel	German	Penguin
2005	Denis Jackson	Theodor Storm	Paul the Puppeteer	German	Angel Books
2006	Len Rix	Magda Szabó	The Door	Hungarian	Harvill Secker
2007	Michael Hofmann (2)	Durs Grünbein	Ashes for Breakfast: Selected Poems	German	Faber
2008	Margaret Jull Costa (2)	José Maria de Eça de Queirós	The Maias	Portuguese	Dedalus
2009	Anthea Bell	Saša Stanišić	How the Soldier Repairs the Gramophone	German	
2010	Jamie McKendrick	Valerio Magrelli	The Embrace: Selected Poems	Italian	Faber and Faber
2011	Margaret Jull Costa (3)	José Saramago	The Elephant's Journey	Portuguese	Harvill Secker
2012	Judith Landry	Diego Marani	New Finnish Grammar	Italian	
2013	Philip Boehm	Herta Müller	The Hunger Angel	German	Portobello
2014	Susan Wicks	Valérie Rouzeau	Talking Vrouz	French	
2015	Susan Bernofsky	Jenny Erpenbeck	The End of Days	German	
2016 (s)	Paul Vincent and John Irons	Various	100 Dutch-Language Poems	Dutch	Holland Park Press
2016 (s)	Philip Roughton	Jón Kalman Stefánsson	The Heart of Man	Icelandic	MacLehose Press
2017	Frank Perry	Lina Wolff	Bret Easton Ellis and the Other Dogs	Swedish	And Other Stories
2018	Lisa Dillman	Andrés Barba	Such Small Hands	Spanish	Portobello Books
2019	Celia Hawkesworth	Ivo Andrić	Omer Pasha Latas	Serbo-Croatian	New York Review of Books
2020	David Hackston	Pajtim Statovci	Crossing	Finnish	Pushkin Press
2021	Nichola Smalley	Andrzej Tichý	Wretchedness	Swedish	And Other Stories
2022	Nancy Naomi Carlson	Khal Torabully	Cargo Hold of Stars: Coolitude	Mauritian French	Seagull Books
2023	Monica Cure	Liliana Corobca	The Censor's Notebook	Romanian	Seven Stories Press UK
2024	Mark Polizzotti	Scholastique Mukasonga	Kibogo	Rwandan French	Daunt Books
2025	Jeffrey Zuckerman	Adèle Rosenfeld	Jellyfish Have No Ears	French	MacLehose Press

== Shortlists ==
=== 2007 ===
- Joel Agee’s translation of Selected Writings by Friedrich Durrenmatt – German, University of Chicago Press
- Anthea Bell’s translation of Vienna by Eva Menasse – German, Weidenfeld and Nicolson
- Robin Kirkpatrick’s translation of Inferno by Dante – Italian, Penguin
- Sverre Lyngstad’s translation of Shyness and Dignity by Dag Solstad – Norwegian, Harvill Secker
- Sandra Smith’s translation of Suite française by Irène Némirovsky – French, Chatto and Windus

=== 2008 ===
- Richard Dove’s translation of Raving Language: Selected Poems 1946-2006 by Friederike Mayröcker – German, Carcanet
- Jamie McKendrick’s translation of The Garden of the Finzi-Continis by Giorgio Bassani – Italian, Penguin
- Mike Mitchell’s translation of The Bells of Bruges by Georges Rodenbach – French, Dedalus
- Natasha Randall’s translation of We by Yevgeny Zamyatin – Russian, Vintage
- Ina Rilke’s translation of The Darkroom of Damocles by Willem Frederik Hermans – Dutch, Harvill Secker

=== 2009 ===
- David Colmer’s translation of The Twin by Gerbrand Bakker – Dutch, Harvill Secker
- Sarah Death’s translation of The Director by Alexander Ahndoril – Swedish, Portobello Books
- Christine Donougher’s translation of Magnus by Sylvie Germain – French, Dedalus
- Michael Hofmann’s translation of The Seventh Well by Fred Wander – German, Granta
- Marek Tomin’s translation of Of Kids and Parents by Emil Hakl – Czech, Twisted Spoon

=== 2010 ===
- Susan Wicks’s translation of Cold Spring in Winter by Valérie Rouzeau – French, Arc
- Larisa Gureyeva & George Hyde’s translation of Pro Eto – That’s What by Vladimir Mayakovsky – Russian, Arc
- Howard Curtis’s translation of Three Tales by Gustave Flaubert – French, Hesperus Press
- Lazer Lederhendler’s translation of Nikolski by Nicolas Dickner – French, Portobello Books
- Sam Garrett’s translation of Joe Speedboat by Tommy Wieringa – Dutch, Portobello Books

=== 2011 ===
- Anne McLean’s translation of The Secret History of Costaguana by Juan Gabriel Vásquez – Spanish, Bloomsbury
- Christopher Middleton’s translation of 130 Poems by Jean Follain – French, Anvil Press
- Robert and Elizabeth Chandler, with Anna Aslanyan’s translation of Everything Flows by Vasily Grossman – Russian, Harvill Secker
- Tom Geddes’s translation of The Journey of Anders Sparrman by Per Wästberg – Swedish, Granta
- Hugh Rorrison and Helen Chambers’s translation of No Way Back by Theodor Fontane – German, Angel Books

=== 2012 ===
- John Ashbery’s translation of Illuminations by Arthur Rimbaud – French, Carcanet
- Margaret Jull Costa’s translation of Seven Houses in France by Bernardo Atxaga – Spanish, Harvill Secker
- Howard Curtis’s translation of How I Lost the War by Filippo Bologna – Italian, Pushkin
- Rosalind Harvey’s translation of Down the Rabbit Hole by Juan Pablo Villalobos – Spanish, And Other Stories
- Martin McLaughlin’s translation of Into the War by Italo Calvino – Italian, Penguin

=== 2013 ===
- Tess Lewis’s translation of One Hundred Days by Lukas Bärfuss – German, Granta
- Louise B. Popkin’s translation of Witness by Mario Benedetti – Spanish, White Pine Press
- Sam Taylor’s translation of HHhH by Laurent Binet – French, Harvill Secker
- Frank Wynne’s translation of The Blue Hour by Alonso Cueto – Spanish, Heinemann
- Mike Mitchell’s translation of The Lairds of Cromarty by Jean-Pierre Ohl – French, Dedalus

=== 2014 ===
- Anthea Bell’s translation of In Times of Fading Light by Eugen Ruge – German, Faber
- Isabel Fargo Cole’s translation of The Jew Car by Franz Fühmann – German, Seagull Books
- David Homel’s translation of The Enigma of the Return by Dany Laferrière – French, MacLehose Press
- Peter Daniels’s translation of Selected Poems Vladislav Khodasevich – Russian, Angel Classics
- Alastair McEwen’s translation of Every Promise by Andrea Bajani – Italian, MacLehose Press
- Edward Gauvin’s translation of The Conductor and Other Tales by Jean Ferry – French, Wakefield Press
- Mira Rosenthal’s translation of Colonies by Tomasz Różycki – Polish, Zephyr Press

=== 2015 ===
- Nick Caistor and Lorenza Garcia’s translation of Talking to Ourselves by Andrés Neuman – Spanish, Pushkin Press
- Euan Cameron’s translation of The Incorrigible Optimists Club by Jean-Michel Guenassia – French, Atlantic Books
- Will Firth’s translation of The Great War by Aleksandar Gatalica – Serbian, Istros Books
- Anne Stokes’s translation of Ice Roses by Sarah Kirsch – German, Carcanet Press
- Geoffrey Strachan’s translation of The Sermon on the Fall of Rome by Jérôme Ferrari – French, MacLehose Press
- Stefan Tobler’s translation of Água Viva by Clarice Lispector – Portuguese, Penguin Books
- Paul Vincent’s translation of While the Gods Were Sleeping by Erwin Mortier – Dutch, Pushkin Press

=== 2016 ===
- John Cullen’s translation of The Meursault Investigation by Kamel Daoud – French, Oneworld
- Stephen Pearl’s translation of The Same Old Story by Ivan Goncharov – Russian, Alma Classics
- Don Bartlett’s translation of Dancing in the Dark: My Struggle by Karl Ove Knausgaard – Norwegian, Harvill Secker
- Shaun Whiteside’s translation of Melnitz by Charles Lewinsky – German, Atlantic Books
- Lola M. Rogers’s translation of When the Doves Disappeared by Sofi Oksanen – Finnish, Atlantic Books
- Lisa C. Hayden’s translation of Laurus by Eugene Vodolazkin – Russian, Oneworld

=== 2017 ===
- Ben Faccini’s translation of Cry, Mother Spain by Lydie Salvayre – French, MacLehose
- Philip Ó Ceallaigh’s translation of For Two Thousand Years by Mihail Sebastian – Romanian, Penguin Classics
- Natasha Wimmer’s translation of Sudden Death by Álvaro Enrigue – Spanish, Harvill Secker
- Lisa Dillman’s translation of The Transmigration of Bodies by Yuri Herrera – Spanish, And Other Stories
- Lisa C. Hayden’s translation of Masha Regina by Vadim Levental – Russian, Oneworld
- Rawley Grau’s translation of Panorama by Dušan Šarotar – Slovenian, Peter Owen World Series/Istros Books
- Arthur Goldhammer’s translation of Stéphane Heuet’s graphic-novel adaptation of In Search of Lost Time: Swann’s Way by Marcel Proust – French, Gallic

=== 2018 ===
- Misha Hoekstra’s translation of Mirror, Shoulder, Signal by Dorthe Nors – Danish, Pushkin Press
- Susan Bernofsky’s translation of Memoirs of a Polar Bear by Yoko Tawada – German, Portobello Books
- Forrest Gander’s translation of Then Come Back: The Lost Neruda Poems by Pablo Neruda – Spanish, Bloodaxe Books
- Helen Constantine’s translation of A Love Story by Émile Zola – French, Oxford University Press
- Laura Marris’s translation of Blood Dark by Louis Guilloux – French, New York Review Books
- Michael Lucey’s translation of The End of Eddy by Édouard Louis – French, Harvill Secker
- Celia Hawkesworth’s translation of Belladonna by Daša Drndić – Croatian, MacLehose Press

=== 2019 ===
- Philip Roughton’s translation of About the Size of the Universe by Jón Kalman Stefánsson, – Icelandic, MacLehose
- Bryan Karetnyk’s translation of The Beggar and Other Stories by Gaito Gazdanov – Russian, Pushkin Press
- Delija Valiukenas’s translation of Shadows on the Tundra by Dalia Grinkevičiūtė – Lithuanian, Peirene
- Ken Cockburn’s translation of Heroines from Abroad by Christine Marendon – German, Carcanet
- Nick Caistor’s translation of Springtime in a Broken Mirror by Mario Benedetti – Spanish, Penguin
- Rosie Hedger’s translation of Zero by Gine Cornelia Pedersen – Norwegian, Nordisk Books
- Rachael McGill’s translation of The Desert and the Drum by Mbarek Ould Beyrouk – French, Dedalus

=== 2020 ===
- David Connolly and Joshua Barley’s translation of A Greek Ballad by Michális Ganás – Greek, Yale UP
- Tina Kover’s translation of Older Brother by Mahir Guven – French, Europa
- Anya Migdal’s translation of Aetherial Worlds by Tatyana Tolstaya – Russian, Daunt Books
- Ina Rilke and David McKay’s translation of Max Havelaar by Multatuli – Dutch, New York Review Books
- Rawley Grau’s translation of Billiards at the Hotel Dobray by Dušan Šarotar – Slovene, Istros Books
- Jethro Soutar’s translation of The Madwoman of Serrano by Dina Salústio – Portuguese, Dedalus
- Jamie Bulloch’s translation of You Would Have Missed Me by Birgit Vanderbeke – German, Peirene Press

=== 2021 ===
- Teresa Lavender Fagan’s translation of The Last Days of Mandelstam by Vénus Khoury-Ghata – French, Seagull
- Michele Hutchison’s translation of The Discomfort of Evening by Marieke Lucas Rijneveld – Dutch, Faber
- Karen Leeder’s translation of I Am a Field Full of Rapeseed, Give Cover to Deer and Shine Like Thirteen Oil Paintings Laid One on Top of the Other by Ulrike Almut Sandig – German, Seagull
- Suzanne Jill Levine’s translation of Bezoar by Guadalupe Nettel – Spanish, Seven Stories Press UK
- Anna Moschovakis’s translation of At Night All Blood Is Black by David Diop – French, Pushkin
- Caroline Schmidt’s translation of Grove by Esther Kinsky – German, Fitzcarraldo
- Padma Viswanathan’s translation of São Bernardo by Graciliano Ramos – Portuguese, NYRB

=== 2022 ===
The 2022 shortlist was announced on 18 May.

- Stuart Bell's translation of Bird Me by Édith Azam – French, the87 press
- Jen Calleja's translation of The Liquid Land by Raphaela Edelbauer – German, Scribe
- Sasha Dugdale's translation of In Memory of Memory by Maria Stepanova – Russian, Fitzcarraldo
- Daniel Hahn's translation of Occupation by Julian Fuks – Portuguese (Brazil), Charco Press
- Rachael McGill's translation of Co-Wives, Co-Widows by Adrienne Yabouza – French/Sangho (CAR), Dedalus
- Tiago Miller's translation of The Song of Youth by Montserrat Roig – Catalan, Fum D’Estampa Press
- Cristina Sandu's translation of Union of Synchronised Swimmers by Cristina Sandu – Finnish, Scribe

==== Longlist ====
- Bernard Adams's translation of The Hangman's House by Andrea Tompa – Hungarian, Seagull Books.
- Jack Bevan's translation of the Complete Poems of Salvatore Quasimodo – Italian, Carcanet
- Alexandra Büchler's translation of Dream of a Journey by Kateřina Rudčenková – Czech, Parthian
- John Litell's translation of Nordic Fauna by Andrea Lundgren – Swedish, Peirene
- Janet Livingstone's translation of Boat Number Five by Monika Kompaníková – Slovak, Seagull Books
- Julia Sanches's translation of Permafrost by Eva Baltasar – Catalan, And Other Stories
- Damion Searls's translation of A New Name by Jon Fosse – Norwegian, Fitzcarraldo
- Jeffrey Zuckerman's translation of Night As It Falls by Jakuta Alikavazovic – French, Faber

=== 2023 ===
==== Shortlist ====
The 2023 shortlist was announced on 18 May.

- Monica Cure’s translation of The Censor's Notebook by Liliana Corobca – Romanian, Seven Stories
- Mara Faye Lethem’s translation of When I Sing, Mountains Dance by Irene Solà – Catalan, Granta
- Megan McDowell’s translation of Chilean Poet by Alejandro Zambra – Spanish (Chile), Granta
- Eugene Ostashevsky’s translation of Lucky Breaks by Yevgenia Belorusets – Russian (Ukraine), Pushkin
- Johanne Sorgenfri Ottosen’s translation of Awake by Harald Voetmann – Danish, Lolli
- Lara Vergnaud’s translation of The Last One by Fatima Daas – French, HopeRoad
- Claire Wadie’s translation of Of Saints and Miracles by Manuel Astur – Spanish, Peirene
- Kate Webster’s translation of The Map by Barbara Sadurska – Polish, Terra Librorum

=== 2024 ===
The 2024 shortlist was announced on 21 May.

- Patrizio Ceccagnoli and Susan Stewart's translation of Historiae by Antonella Anedda – Italian, NYRB
- Daniel Hahn's translation of The Living and the Rest by José Eduardo Agualusa – Portuguese (Angola), MacLehose
- Ellen Jones's translation of The Remains by Margo Glantz – Spanish (Mexico), Charco
- Johnny Lorenz's translation of Crooked Plow by Itamar Vieira Junior – Portuguese (Brazil), Verso
- Jenny McPhee's translation of Lies and Sorcery by Elsa Morante – Italian, NYRB
- Zoe Perry's translation of Of Cattle and Men by Ana Paula Maia – Portuguese (Brazil), Charco
- Mark Polizzotti's translation of Kibogo by Scholastique Mukasonga – French (Rwanda), Daunt
- Oonagh Stransky's translation of The House on Via Gemito by Domenico Starnone – Italian, Europa

==== Longlist ====
- Carla Baricz's translation of Exiled Shadow by Norman Manea – Romanian, Yale UP
- Simon Deefholts and Kathryn Phillips-Miles's translation of Sur by Antonio Soler – Spanish, Peter Owen
- Katrina Dodson's translation of Macunaíma by Mário de Andrade – Portuguese (Brazil), Fitzcarraldo
- Michael Hofmann's translation of Kairos by Jenny Erpenbeck – German, Granta
- Lola Rogers's translation of Summer Fishing in Lapland by Juhani Karila – Finnish, Pushkin
- Jordan Stump's translation of Vengeance is Mine by Marie NDiaye – French, MacLehose
- Sam Taylor's translation of Beyond the Door of No Return by David Diop – French (Senegal), Pushkin
- Alissa Valles's translation of Firebird by Zuzanna Ginczanka – Polish, NYRB

=== 2025 ===
The 2025 shortlist was announced on 21 May.

- Alison Anderson's translation of The Silence of the Choir by Mohamed Mbougar Sarr – French (Senegal), Europa
- Piotr Florczyk and Alice-Catherine Carls's translation of A Calligraphy of Days by Krzysztof Siwczyk – Polish, Seagull
- Celia Hawkesworth's translation of The Brass Age by Slobodan Šnajder – Croatian, Mountain Leopard
- Megan McDowell's translation of Childish Literature by Alejandro Zambra – Spanish (Chile), Fitzcarraldo
- Philip Roughton's translation of Your Absence Is Darkness by Jón Kalman Stefánsson – Icelandic, MacLehose
- Oonagh Stransky's translation of Abandonment by Erminia Dell’Oro – Italian, Heloise
- Katie Whittemore's translation of Un Amor by Sara Mesa – Spanish, Peirene
- Jeffrey Zuckerman's translation of Jellyfish Have No Ears by Adèle Rosenfeld – French, MacLehose

==== Longlist ====
- Megan Berkobien and María Cristina Hall's translation of Chrysalis, Pastoral in B Minor by Susanna Rafart – Catalan, Fum d’Estampa
- Boris Dralyuk's translation of The Silver Bone by Andrey Kurkov – Ukrainian, MacLehose
- Kristen Gehrman's translation of I Will Live by Lale Gül – Dutch, Virago
- Michele Hutchison's translation of My Heavenly Favourite by Lucas Rijneveld – Dutch, Faber
- Karen Leeder's translation of Shining Sheep by Ulrike Almut Sandig – German, Seagull
- Megan McDowell's translation of A Sunny Place for Shady People by Mariana Enríquez – Spanish (Argentina), Granta
- Frances Riddle's translation of Time of the Flies by Claudia Piñeiro – Spanish (Argentina), Charco
- Saskia Vogel's translation of The Singularity by Balsam Karam – Swedish, Fitzcarraldo
