= Arc Publications =

- Founded: 1969
- Founder: Tony Ward
- Country of origin: United Kingdom
- Headquarters location: Todmorden, Lancashire
- Publication types: Poetry
- Official website: www.arcpublications.co.uk

Arc Publications, also known as Arc, is an independent publishing house in the UK, publishing contemporary poetry from new and established writers from the UK and abroad, specialising in the work of international poets writing in English and the work of overseas poets in translation.

Arc publishes up to 16 new books of poetry every year.

== Origins ==
Arc Publications began its life when Tony Ward took over the reins in 1969. Until then, it had been run by a writers' collective based in the Medway Towns and had little in terms of literary production. Tony Ward started then printing pamphlets and poetry collections by new poets writing in English, and in 1974 associated with the Arvon Foundation, moving to Todmorden.

Arc left its Arvon base in Hebden Bridge and became independent not only in publishing but also printing its own titles as well as providing printing services for Anvil Press, Galloping Dog Press, Ferry Press, Spectacular Diseases and Trigram Press in the Lancashire/Yorkshire border town of Todmorden. The reasoning behind the choice of publications was to produce "what was important to poetry", despite personal choices or reception or their marketability.

In 1993, Tony Ward built a new editorial board, reviving the press. The new co-editors were Michael Hulse and David Morley, who re-launched the press to include both a UK and an International series of poetry in English.

In 1994, Angela Jarman joined the board, bringing with her the creation of Arc Music in 1998, with pre-press and marketing duties.

In 1995, Jean Boase-Beier was appointed editor of the Translation series, publishing contemporary and past poetry from around the world in English translation, with sub-series including Visible Poets and Classics.

In 1998, Michael Hulse left Arc, and John Kinsella replaced him in supervising the International series.

In 2001, David Morley's duties were taken up by Jo Shapcott, who worked with Arc until 2006, when John W Clarke was appointed as editor of the UK series.

== Arc Publications today ==
Arc currently publishes around 16 titles a year, with series including International, Music, Translation, and UK & Ireland.

Arc participated in the Poetry Parnassus project (part of the London 2012 Cultural Olympiad) with 19 of its poets in the UK to read. The launch event featured Simon Armitage, and three Arc poets - Kristiina Ehin, Zeyar Lynn and Alvin Pang.

== Awards and prizes ==
Arc have received a number of significant recognitions in recent years, including:

- Shortlisted for the 2010 (Susan Wicks) and 2011 (Philip Mosley) Griffin Poetry Prize.
- Shortlisted twice for the 2010 Oxford-Weidenfeld Translation Prize.
- Poetry Book Society Recommended Translations in 2008, 2010, 2011 and 2012, plus a special commendation.
- The 2010 Scott Moncrieff Prize for Susan Wicks' translation of Valérie Rouzeau's Pas Revoir (Cold Spring in Winter).
- A listing in "Best Poetry Books of 2010" in the online magazine of The New York Times for a translation from the Estonian.
- Simon Armitage's choice of an Arc title for The Guardian′s "Best Books of 2011".
- Shortlisted for the 2012 Russian Rossica Prize with Pro Eto – That’s What by Mayakovsky, translated by Larisa Gureye and George Hyde.

== Location ==
Arc publications was originally located in Gillingham, Kent. Since 1986 it operates from Nanholme Mill, between Hebden Bridge and Todmorden, on the border of Lancashire and Yorkshire.
