= One World Publications =

One World Publications may refer to:

- Oneworld Publications, an independent British publisher
- One World, an imprint of Random House
