= Saskia Vogel =

American writer and translator

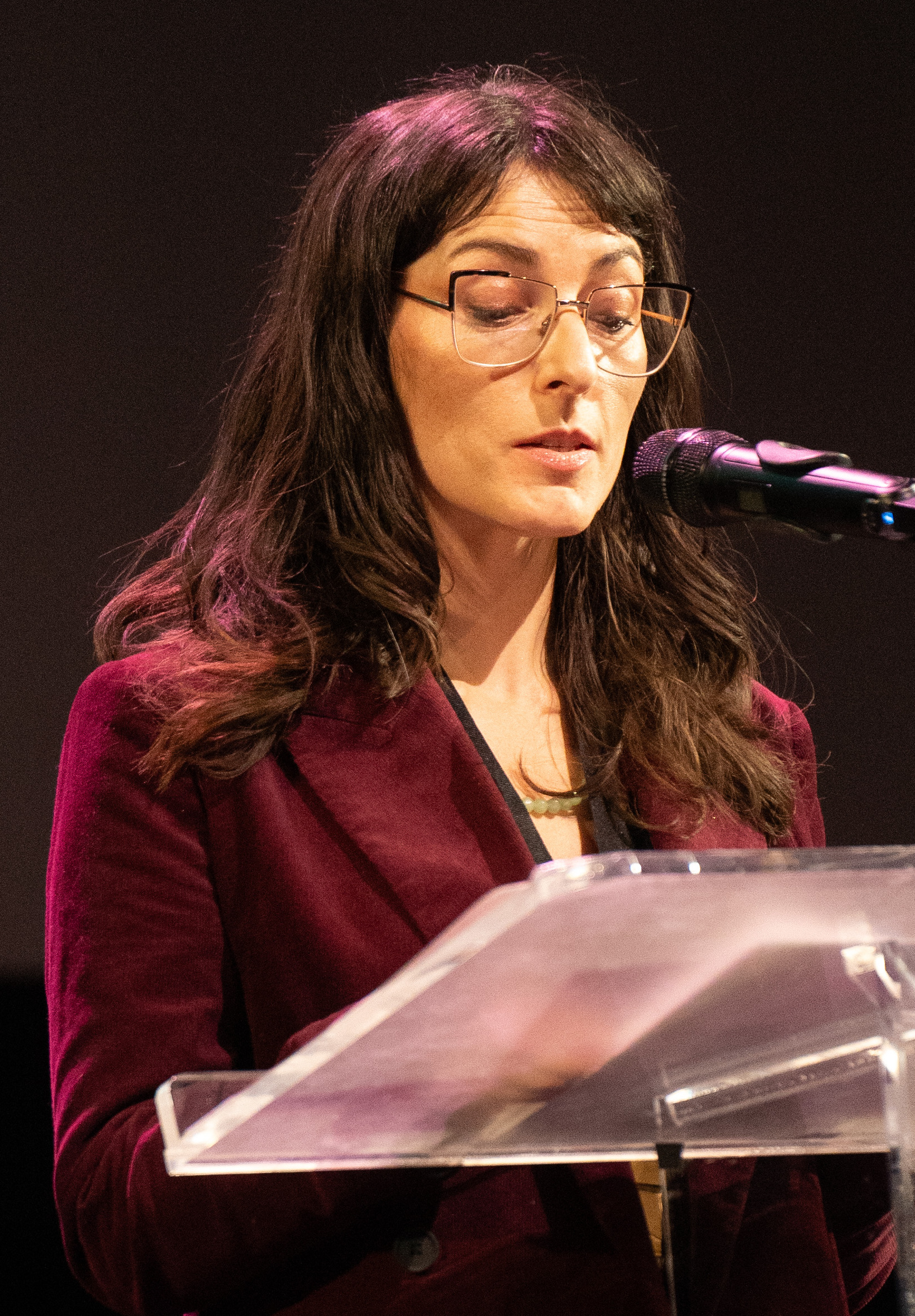
- Vogel at the 2024 National Book Awards finalist reading
- Born: Saskia Maria Desiree Vogel; September 17, 1981 (age 45); Los Angeles, California, U.S.
- Occupations: Author, translator

Saskia Maria Desiree Vogel (born September 17, 1981) is an American-Swedish author, translator, and editor. Her debut novel, Permission, explores the question “How do I want to be loved?” through the story of a grieving young woman's relationship with the dominatrix next door who's renting a room to her oldest client. Set in coastal Los Angeles, it pursues a new understanding of the erotic and queer family-building. It was first published in English in 2019, and later in French, German, Spanish, Italian, and Swedish.

Vogel's work as a writer and translator centers hidden, underrepresented, and misunderstood narratives. Central themes of her writing include language, power, and sexuality. These themes carry over into her translation work, which expands into formal experimentation with language, trauma, migration, and Indigenous histories.

Vogel's translations and writing have appeared in publications such as Granta, Granta Sweden, the New York Times, The New Yorker, The Paris Review, The White Review, and The Quietus. She received an honorable mention from the Pushchart Prize in 2017 for her "Sluts", first published by The Offing. Her translation of Lina Wolff's The Polyglot Lovers (published by And Other Stories in 2019) was described by TLS as "an impeccable pairing, given Vogel’s previous form with disrobers of the misogynist regalia". In 2024, her translation of Linnea Axelsson’s Aednan was a finalist for the National Book Award (Translated Literature): “Ædnan is a layered translation from the Swedish—a resonant telling of Sámi-speaking Indigenous peoples’ lost language and migrant history, revealed by Saskia Vogel's inspired English rendering.”

Currently residing in Berlin, Germany, Vogel has lived in Sweden, the UK, and the US.

== Career ==
Vogel started her career in 2007 as a managing editor at the AVN (Adult Video News) Media Network and then from 2010-2013 worked as Granta magazine’s global publicist. Since 2013, Vogel has been a freelance Swedish-to-English literary translator, translating leading Swedish authors such as Birgitta Trotzig, Balsam Karam, Karolina Ramqvist, Katrine Marcal, Johannes Anyuru, and Rut Hillarp.

Permission (2019), her debut novel, was published in six languages and was longlisted for the Believer Book Award.

Vogel completed her translation of the National-Book-Award-nominated novel-in-verse Aednan during her time as Princeton University’s Fall 2022 Translator in Residence, and wrote about the translation process in the 2023 essay “The Same River Twice: Notes on Reading, Time, and Translation.” She has hosted workshops on translation, writing, and the editing process. She has been a visiting speaker at a number of universities, including Konstfack Stockholm, UC Berkeley, Bard College Berlin, University of Paderborn, and the Free University of Berlin. She has also appeared at numerous festivals and events, including at the Literarische Colloquium Berlin, the London Literature Festival, the Edinburgh International Book Festival, the Internationales Literaturfestival Berlin, and Pordenonelegge.

Vogel worked with publisher and founder Lucy Roeber to relaunch the magazine Erotic Review, reconceived for a contemporary audience in Spring 2024. Designed by Studio Frith, this new iteration of the 30-year-old British publication is reimagined as a platform for art and literature that explores humanity through the lens of desire. Vogel serves as deputy editor of the magazine.

== Translated works ==
- Aednan by Linnea Axelsson. 2024.
- The Singularity by Balsam Karam. 2024.
- The Devil’s Grip by Lina Wolff. 2024.
- Caesaria by Hanna Nordenhök. 2024.
- The Ways of Paradise by Peter Cornell. 2024.
- Days and Days and Days by Tone Schunnesson. 2023.
- The Bear Woman by Karolina Ramqvist. 2022.
- Strega by Johanne Lykke Holm. 2022.
- The October Child by Linda Boström Knausgård. 2021.
- W. by Steve Sem-Sandberg. 2021.
- In the Vienna Woods The Trees Remain by Elisabeth Åsbrink. 2020.
- The Summer of Kim Novak by Håkan Nesser. 2020.
- Many People Die Like You by Lina Wolff. 2020.
- Our House Is on Fire by Greta Thunberg, Malena Ernman et al. (co-translated with Paul Norlén) 2020.
- Girls Lost by Jessica Schiefauer. 2020.
- They Will Drown in Their Mothers' Tears by Johannes Anyuru. 2019.
- The Polyglot Lovers by Lina Wolff. 2019.
- The White City by Karolina Ramqvist. 2018.
- Acts of Infidelity by Lena Andersson. 2018.
- The Anatomy of Inequality by Per Molander. 2016.
- The Book of Palms by Johanna Ekström. 2016.
- Who Cooked Adam Smith's Dinner? by Katrine Marçal. 2015.
- All Monsters Must Die: An Excursion to North Korea by Magnus Bärtås and Fredrik Ekman. 2015.

== Awards ==
- Oxford-Weidenfeld Translation Prize Longlist (2025) for The Singularity by Balsam Karam
- National Book Award Finalist in Translated Literature (2024) for Aednan by Linnea Axelsson
- Warwick Prize for Women in Translation Longlist (2024) for Aednan by Linnea Axelsson
- University of Iowa's Translators’ Choice Award (2024) for The Singularity by Balsam Karam
- Bernard Shaw Prize (2023) for Strega by Johanne Lykke Holm
- Princeton Translator in Residence (Fall 2022)
- English PEN Translation Award Finalist for Girls Lost by Jessica Schiefauer (2021)
- Berlin Senate Grant for Writers of Non-German-language Literature (2021)
- CLMP Firecracker Award Winner for Fiction (2020) for They Will Drown in Their Mothers’ Tears by Johannes Anyuru
- Believer Book Award Longlist (2019) for Permission by Saskia Vogel
- Petrona Award Shortlist (2018) for The White City by Karolina Ramqvist
- English PEN Translates Award (2017) for The Polyglot Lovers by Lina Wolff
- Pushcart Prize Honorable Mention for Nonfiction (2017)
