= Frank Perry (disambiguation) =

Frank Perry was an American filmmaker.

Frank Perry may also refer to:

- Frank Perry (politician)
- Frank Perry (translator)
