= The Cancer Survivors Club =

- Author: Chris Geiger
- Language: English
- Genre: Non-fiction
- Published: 2015 Oneworld Publications
- Publication place: United Kingdom
- Media type: Print (hardback & paperback)
- Pages: 276
- ISBN: 978-1-78074-726-2

The Cancer Survivors Club is a collection of cancer survival stories, each written from the survivor's perspective.

== Summary ==
The book consists of an introduction and 32 chapters, each featuring different cancer survivors. Included in the book are a number of Geiger's newspaper columns.

== History ==
In an interview, Chris Geiger, a baker from Series 8 of The Great British Bake Off, stated he was diagnosed with non-Hodgkin lymphoma. When first diagnosed he wanted to read stories from other cancer patients who had fought the same cancer and survived. This was the original idea behind The Cancer Survivors Club book. In 2015, Oneworld Publications published this book, giving it a broader audience than when it was originally self published by Geiger in 2013.

== Cancer In Common ==
Cancer In Common was a social network established by Geiger and connecting cancer survivors, patients and their friends. It enabled users to search then communicate privately with other members, based on their type of cancer, age and location.

A common request Geiger got from readers of the The Cancer Survivors Club was about various treatments, side effects or wanting to be put in contact with others who had the same type of cancer.

Cancer In Common featured social network services such as cancer specific discussion groups, geographically specific events, fundraising, social interaction, and photo sharing. The network did not allow anonymous or pseudonymous interactions. Members had to create profiles and could invite others to join their circle of friends. On 1 August 2015, it was announced CancerInCommon would be closed on 1 September 2015.
