= Myint Aung =

Myint Aung may refer to:

- Myint Aung (director) (1931–1996), Burmese film director and film actor
- Myint Aung (politician, born 1959), Burmese politician and political prisoner
- Myint Aung (minister), Burmese minister of mines
- Zeyar Lynn (born 1958), Burmese poet
