= Antje Rávik Strubel =

German writer, translator and literary critic

Antje Rávic Strubel
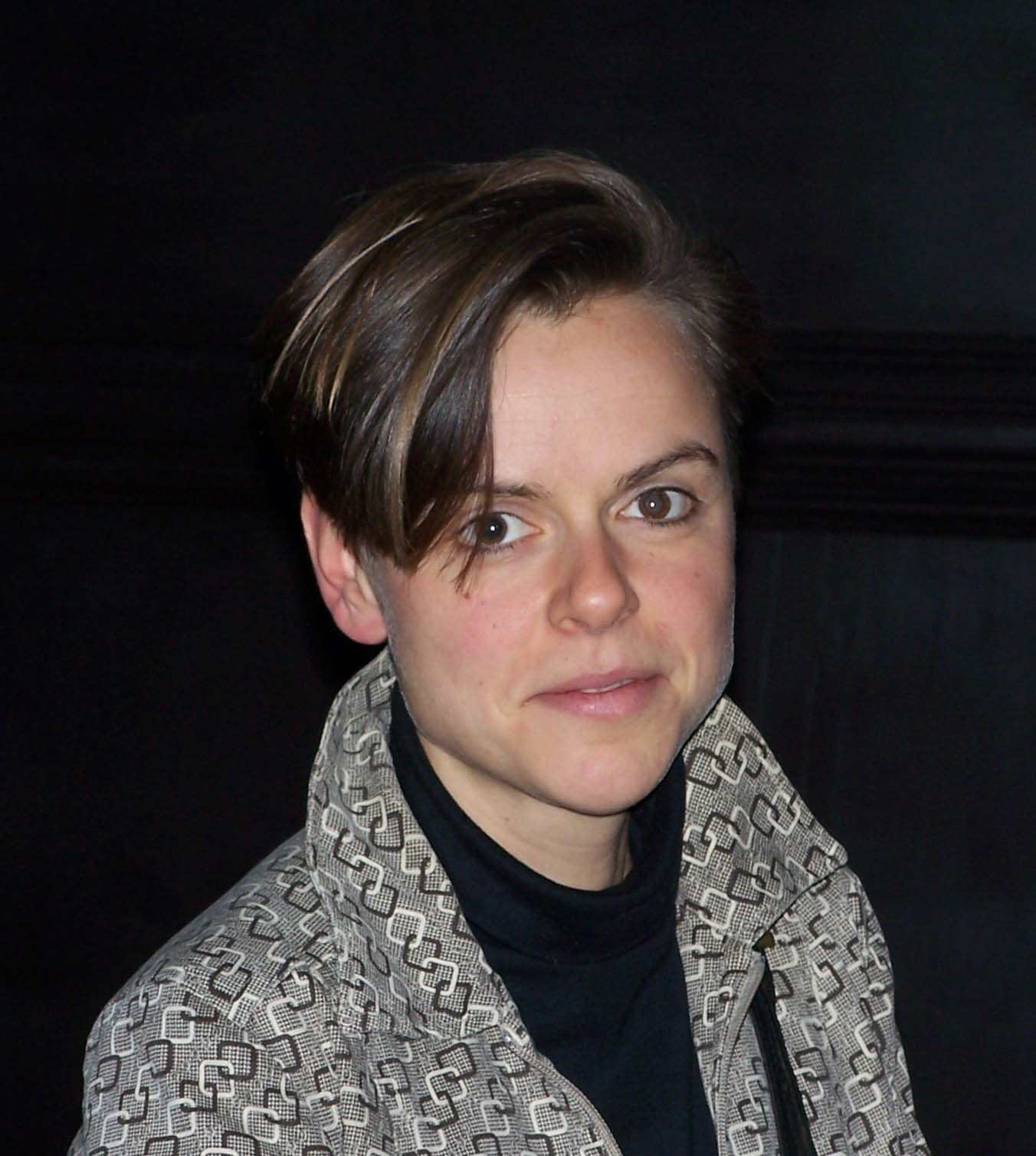
- Antje Rávik Strubel in 2005
- Born: 12 April 1974 (age 51); Potsdam, East Germany
- Occupations: Writer, translator and literary critic

Antje Rávik Strubel, also known as Antje Rávic Strubel (born 12 April 1974) is a German writer, translator, and literary critic. She lives in Potsdam.

== Life ==
Antje Strubel was born in Potsdam and grew up in Ludwigsfelde, East Germany. After leaving school, she first worked as a bookseller in Potsdam, and then studied literature, psychology and American studies in Potsdam and New York. In New York she also worked as a lighting assistant in a theater. She has held residencies as a writer and been a guest professor at various institutions and universities in Germany, the United States, and Finland. She lives and works as a writer and translator in Potsdam, Germany.

With the publication of her first novel, Offene Blende, Strubel added the name Rávik (previously Rávic) to her legal name to designate her writing identity. Since 2018, she spells this writing name Rávik.

== Critical reception ==
Rávik Strubel is part of a generation of writers who were born in East Germany but started publishing after the fall of the Berlin Wall. Much of her fiction deals with identity and transformation in contemporary Europe. In 2001, she published her first two novels, Offene Blende and Unter Schnee (translated as Snowed Under). That year she also received the Ernst Willner Prize in Klagenfurt. Like many of her texts, both of her first novels have main characters born in East Germany, and both novels focus on these women as they travel abroad, explore identity through new jobs and relationships, and reinvent themselves in Europe or America after the fall of the Wall. These are also themes that we find in her later work.

In 2002, Rávik Strubel published her third novel, Fremd gehen, and in 2003 she won the Roswitha Prize and the German Critics Prize.

The title of her 2004 novel Tupolew 134 refers to a Tupolev plane and is based on historical event, the 1977 Aeroflot Tupolev Tu-134 hijacking. Tupolew 134 met with enthusiastic reviews, and in 2005 won the new Marburger Literature Prize and the Bremen Literature Prize. This novel, like both the earlier Fremd gehen (2002) and the later Sturz der Tage in die Nacht (2011), examines memory and the repercussions of politics in East Germany prior to 1989. Her 2007 novel Kältere Schichten der Luft won the Hermann Hesse Prize and the Rheingau Literatur Preis in 2007. It was also shortlisted for the Leipzig Book Prize. In 2012 Sturz der Tage in die Nacht was nominated for the German Book Prize.

Noting that "Memory is always a story," Rávik Strubel uses literature to play with memory, identity, and ways of perceiving both oneself and others. In addition to tackling German history, Rávik Strubel's novels have been praised for their inclusion of gender and sexual diversity with butch and femme lesbians, homosexual, bisexual, genderqueer, and transgender characters. Snowed Under complicates gender identity by offering two main characters, a lesbian couple, who embody "feminine masculinity," which, according to Claudia Breger, complicates notions of both gender and social belonging in conjunction with power positions linked to nationality in post-Wall Eastern Europe. Kältere Schichten der Luft features female-born main character named Anja, who develops a male alter ego named Schmoll, which some scholars have read as a transgender embodiment. In den Wäldern des menschlichen Herzens, which was inspired in part by the theories of Jack Halberstam, introduces two transgender characters, one who has already transitioned when the story begins and the other who transitions over the course of the story.

Strubel has translated fiction from English and Swedish into German. Her translations include books by American novelist Joan Didion and Australian novelist Favel Parrett, as well as short stories by the American writer Lucia Berlin. She has also translated the fiction of Swedish author Karolina Ramqvist. Strubel has also written numerous short stories and published articles, commentaries, and critical reviews in newspapers and literary journals.

In 2021, Blaue Frau, a novel about a complicated love affair set in modern-day Europe, was awarded the German Book Prize.

== Works ==
=== As author ===
- Offene Blende (Open Shutter). Novel. Munich, 2001. ISBN 3-423-24251-5.
- Unter Schnee (Snowed Under). Episodic novel. Munich, 2001. ISBN 3-423-24277-9. Translated as Snowed Under. Translated by Zaia Alexander. Red Hen Press, 2008. ISBN 978-1-59709-401-6.
- Fremd Gehen (Going Strange). Hamburg: Marebuch, 2002. ISBN 3-936384-01-0.
- Tupolew 134. Novel. Munich: CH Beck, 2004. ISBN 3-406-52183-5.
- Kältere Schichten der Luft (Colder Layers of Air). Novel. Frankfurt a. M.: S. Fischer, 2007. ISBN 978-3-10-075121-8.
- Vom Dorf (From the Village). Adventure stories. Munich, 2007. ISBN 978-3-423-24622-4.
- Gebrauchsanweisung für Schweden (Instruction Manual for Sweden). München: Piper, 2008. ISBN 978-3-492-27556-9.
- Gebrauchsanweisung für Potsdam und Brandenburg (Instruction Manual for Potsdam and Brandenburg). München: Piper, 2012. ISBN 978-3-492-27604-7.
- Sturz der Tage in die Nacht (When Days Plunge into Night). Novel. Frankfurt a.M.: S. Fischer, 2012. ISBN 978-3-10-075136-2.
- In den Wäldern des menschlichen Herzens (Into the Forests of the Human Heart). Episodic Novel. Frankfurt a.M.: S. Fischer, 2016. ISBN 978-3-10-002281-3.
- Gebrauchsanweisung fürs Skifahren (Instruction Manual for Skiing). München: Piper, 2016. ISBN 978-3-492-27671-9.
- Blaue Frau (Blue Woman). Frankfurt a. M.: S. Fischer, 2021, ISBN 978-3-10-397101-9.

=== As translator ===
- 2006 – Das Jahr magischen Denkens (Joan Didion, The year of magical thinking)
- 2008 – Wir erzählen uns Geschichten, um zu leben (Joan Didion, We tell ourselves stories in order to survive)
- 2012 – Blaue Stunden (Joan Didion, Blue Nights)
- 2013 – Jenseits der Untiefen (Favel Parrett, Past the Shallows)
- 2016 – Die weiße Stadt (Karolina Ramqvist, Den vita staden)
- 2016 – Was ich sonst noch verpasst habe (Lucia Berlin, select stories from A Manual for Cleaning Women)
- 2017 – Was wirst du tun, wenn du gehst (Lucia Berlin, select stories from A Manual for Cleaning Women)
- 2018 – Süden und Westen Notizen (Joan Didion, South and West: From a Notebook)

=== As editor ===
- Zeitzonen. Literatur in Deutschland 2004 (Time zones. Literature in Germany 2004). Vienna: Edition Selene, 2004. ISBN 3-85266-233-8.
- Was dringend getan werden muss (What urgently needs to be done). Special issue of Neue Rundschau 2013/2. Frankfurt a.M.: Fischer, 2013. ISBN 978-3-10-809093-7.

=== In interviews ===
- Wenn ich auf eine Lösung stoße, ist der Text zu Ende: Werkstattgespräch mit Antje Rávic Strubel (When I hit a solution, the text is complete). Im Atelier: Beträge zur Poetik der Gegenwartsliteratur. Interview by Thomas Boyken and Jan Traphahn. Fuehwerk Verlag, 2008. ISBN 978-3-941295-04-9.
- “‘Memory Is Always a Story’: An Interview with Antje Rávic Strubel.” Interview by Beret Norman and Katie Sutton. Women in German Yearbook vol. 28 (2012): pp. 98–112.
