= Ben Faccini =

English novelist, writer and translator

- Occupations: Novelist; Translator; Writer
- Spouse: Emily Hare
- Children: 3
- Relatives: Piers Faccini (brother)
- Writing career
- Language: English
- Years active: 2002–present
- Notable works: The Water-Breather; The Incomplete Husband; Other People's Children; Cry, Mother Spain

Ben Faccini is an English novelist and translator who was born in England and grew up in France and Italy. After working for many years for UNESCO in Paris, where he wrote extensively on education and disadvantaged children, he published the novels The Water-Breather (2002), The Incomplete Husband (2007), and Other People's Children (2026), and has translated French-language fiction into English, including Lydie Salvayre's Pas pleurer as Cry, Mother Spain, which was shortlisted for the 2017 Oxford-Weidenfeld Translation Prize.

== Origins and upbringing ==
The son of an Italian father and English mother, Faccini grew up in rural France but was educated in England. He is the brother of the singer, songwriter and painter, Piers Faccini.

== UNESCO publications ==
Having worked for many years at UNESCO in Paris (helping between 2008 and 2010 to run its My Life is a Story campaign, to raise awareness about street children), Faccini has written extensively about educational innovations around the world and has been the author, or co-author, of numerous UNESCO publications, including (in English):

- Of copper and fire: the Self-Help Action Plan for Education (SHAPE) in Zambia (1996)
- Early childhood development: laying the foundations of learning (1998)
- From garbage to gold in Cairo (1999)
- Laying Foundations: survival crafts in Mozambique (1999)
- Recycled rags, renewed lives: working with the garbarge collectors of Cairo, Egypt (1999)
- Technology and learning (2000)
- Empress Jovem: the dream of inventive hands (2001)
- Peace Pillar Award Initiative: good practices in support of educating for peace and non-violence (2004)
- Capacity Development for Education for All: translating theory into practice; the CapEFA Programme (2011)

== Novels and translations ==
Faccini has written three novels:

- The Water-Breather (Flamingo, 2002)
- The Incomplete Husband (Portobello Books, 2007)
- Other People's Children (Granta, 2026)

The Water-Breather won the Authors' Club Best First Novel Award in 2002 and the Guardian's review described it as "an assured and moving debut". In reviewing Faccini's second novel, The Incomplete Husband, the Guardian commented that "Faccini's elegantly crafted prose is often poetic and carries complex emotions"..

Granta has announced the publication of Faccini's third novel, Other People's Children, on 7 May 2026. The Financial Times described it as "beautifully balanced" and "a consummately written work of fate, regret and resolution".

Faccini's translations into English include:

- Lydie Salvayre's Pas pleurer (as Cry, Mother Spain) (MacLehose Press, 2016)
- Mahi Binebine's Le Fou du Roi (as The King's Fool) (MacLehose Press, 2020)
- Clara Dupont-Monod's S'adapter (as And the Stones Cry Out) (Maclehose Press, 2024)

His translation of Lydie Salvayre's Pas pleurer was short-listed for the Oxford-Weidenfeld Translation Prize in 2017.

Faccini has also edited with an introduction a collection of stories by six Italian authors, Outsiders (Quercus, 2013), and has acted as a tutor at the Arvon Foundation.

== Personal life ==
Faccini is married to the artist and illustrator, Emily Faccini, daughter of Michael Hare, 2nd Viscount Blakenham. They have three children and live in London and France.
