= Kateřina Rudčenková =

Czech writer and poet (born 1976)

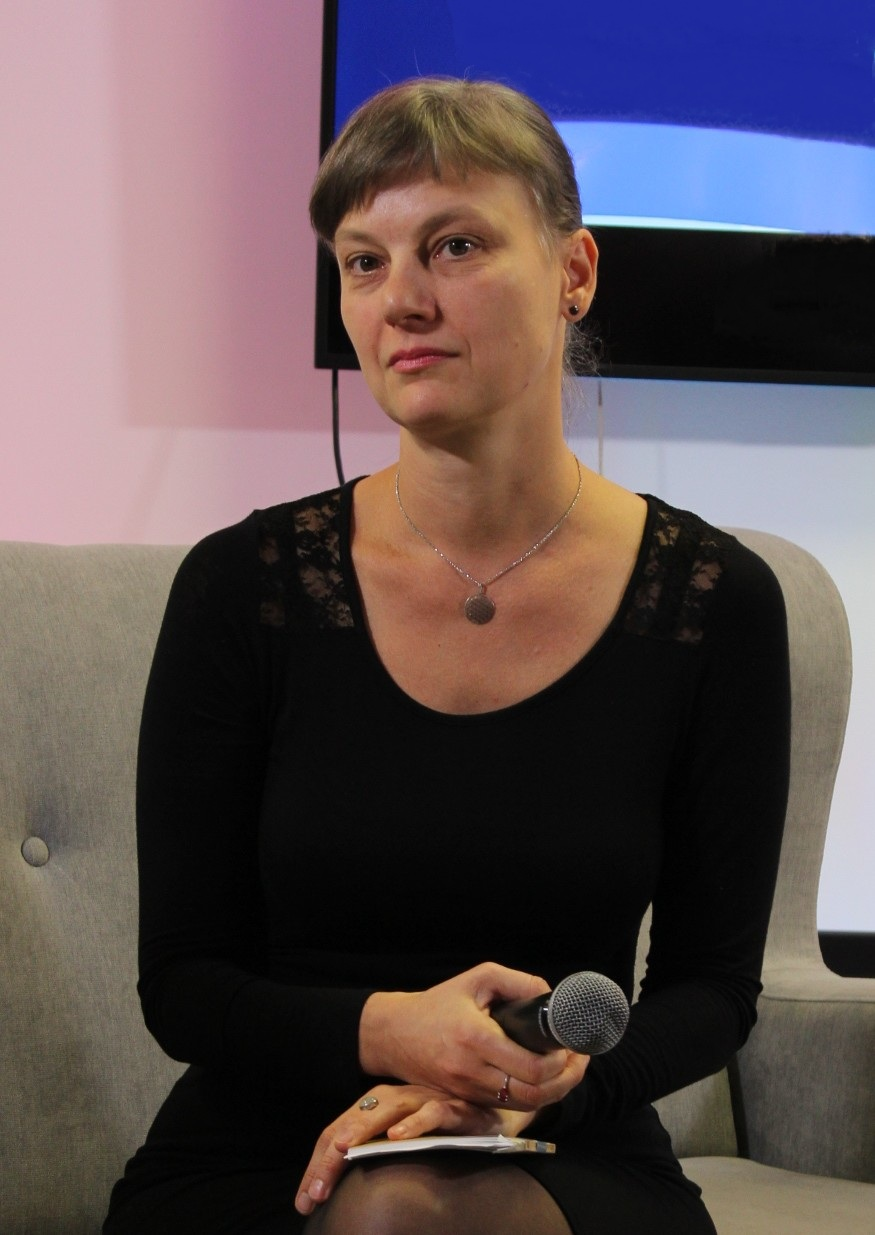
Kateřina Rudčenková

Kateřina Rudčenková (12 April 1976, Prague) is a Czech poet, prose writer and playwright.

== Work ==
She published Ludwig, her first book of poetry in 1999 and her second collection Není nutné, abyste mě navštěvoval (There Is No Need for You to Visit Me) in 2001. These established her as an important contemporary poet, culminating in her winning the prestigious Magnesia Litera Award in 2014 for her collection Chůze po dunách (Walking on Dunes, 2013). Her selected poems have appeared in an English translation by Alexandra Büchler under the title Dream of a Journey: Selected Poems (Parthian Books, 2021), which was nominated for the Oxford-Weidenfeld Prize. Her poetry is also represented in the anthologies A Fine Line: New Poetry from Eastern and Central Europe (Arc Publications, 2004) and Six Czech Poets (Arc Publications, 2008).

Other works include the short story collections called Noci, Noci (Nights, Nights, 2004) and Tchyně nemá jazyk (Mother-in-law has no tongue, 2023), short novel Amáliina nehybnost (Amalia´s Inertia, 2021), for which she received the Reflex Weekly Literary Award, and several plays that have been translated and staged around the world.

In 2007, she won a one-month residency for foreign playwrights at the Royal Court Theatre in London.
