= Francis King (novelist) =

British writer (1923–2011)

Francis King CBE
- Born: Francis Henry King; 4 March 1923; Adelboden, Switzerland
- Died: 3 July 2011 (aged 88); London, England
- Education: Shrewsbury School; Balliol College, Oxford
- Occupations: Novelist; Poet; Short story writer
- Writing career
- Notable awards: Somerset Maugham Award; Golden PEN Award

Francis Henry King CBE (4 March 1923 – 3 July 2011) was a British novelist and short-story writer. He worked for the British Council for 15 years, with positions in Europe and Japan. For 25 years, he was a chief book reviewer for the Sunday Telegraph, and for 10 years its theatre critic.

== Early life and Council career ==
King was born on 4 March 1923 in Adelboden, Switzerland, to a father in the Indian Civil Service, brought up in British India and sent back to England when his father was dying. As a boy, he was shunted around among aunts and uncles.

He was educated at Shrewsbury School and Balliol College, Oxford. During the Second World War he was a conscientious objector and left Oxford to work on the land.

After completing his degree in 1949, King worked for the British Council. His positions with them took him to Italy, Salonika, and finally Kyoto. While he was in Greece he met the uninhibited writer Anne Cumming, who was also working for the British Council. She enjoyed observing his homosexual adventures. In 1964 he resigned to write full-time, by then he had already published nine novels, as well as poetry and a memoir.

== Literary career ==
He won the Somerset Maugham Award for his novel The Dividing Stream (1951). In 2000, he was awarded the Golden PEN Award by English PEN for "a Lifetime's Distinguished Service to Literature".

His 1956 book The Firewalkers was published pseudonymously under the name Frank Cauldwell.

King's gay-themed 1969 novel, A Domestic Animal, was longlisted for the Lost Man Booker Prize in 2010, and invited a threat of libel action by former Labour Party MP Tom Skeffington-Lodge. In the novel, successful middle-aged novelist Dick Thompson finds himself falling in love with Antonio Valli, a charming but heterosexual young Italian philosopher who is lodging with him.

From 1986 to 1989 he was President of PEN International, the worldwide association of writers and oldest human rights organisation. He was a Fellow of the Royal Society of Literature, and was appointed an Officer (OBE) of the Order of the British Empire in 1979 and a Commander of the Order (CBE) in 1985. In 2003, his novel The Nick of Time was long-listed for the Man Booker Prize.

== Personal life ==
King came out as homosexual in the 1970s. After his long-term partner had died from AIDS in 1988, King described their relationship in Yesterday Came Suddenly (1993). King suffered a stroke in 2005.

== Death ==
Francis King died on 3 July 2011, at the age of 88.

== Works ==
- To the Dark Tower (1946) – novel
- Never Again (1948) – novel
- An Air That Kills (1948) – novel
- The Dividing Stream (1951) – novel (winner of the Somerset Maugham Award)
- Rod of Incantation (1952) – poems
- The Dark Glasses (1954) – novel
- The Firewalkers: a Memoir (1956) (written under the name Frank Cauldwell)
- Introducing Greece (1956) – travel
- The Man on the Rock (1957) – novel
- The Widow (1957) – novel
- So Hurt and Humiliated (1959) – short story collection
- The Custom House (1961) – novel
- The Japanese Umbrella and Other Stories (1964) – short story collection
- The Last of the Pleasure Gardens (1965) – novel
- The Waves Behind the Boat (1967) – novel
- Robert de Montesquiou by Philippe Julian (1967) – translator, along with John Haylock
- The Brighton Belle and Other Stories (1968) – short story collection
- A Domestic Animal (1970) – novel (revised version of the suppressed 1969 edition)
- Flights (1973) – novel
- A Game of Patience (1974) – novel
- The Needle (1975) – novel
- Christopher Isherwood (1976) – critical study
- Hard Feelings (1976) – short story collection
- E.M. Forster and his World (1978) – biography
- The Action (1976) – novel
- Indirect Method (1980) – short story collection
- Florence (1982) – history
- Act of Darkness (1983) – novel
- Voices in an Empty Room (1984) – novel
- One is a wanderer (1984) – selected stories
- Frozen Music (1987) – novella
- Danny Hill: memoirs of a prominent gentleman (1987) – novel
- Visiting Cards (1990) – novel
- The Woman who was God (1988) – novel
- Punishments (1989) – novel
- The Ant Colony (1992) – novel
- Yesterday Came Suddenly (1993) – autobiography
- The One and Only (1994) – novel
- Ash on an old man's sleeve (1996) – novel
- A Hand at the Shutter (1996) – short story collection
- Dead Letters (1998) – novel
- Prodigies (2001) – novel
- The Nick of Time (2002) – novel
- The Sunlight on the Garden (2005) – short story collection
- With My Little Eye (2007) – novel
- Cold Snap (2009) – novel

Non-profit organization positions
Preceded by Per Wästberg	International President of PEN International; 1986–1989	Succeeded by René Tavernier
