= They Will Drown in their Mothers' Tears =

2017 novel by Johannes Anyuru

- Author: Johannes Anyuru
- Original title: De kommer att drunkna i sina mödrars tårar
- Translator: Saskia Vogel
- Language: Swedish
- Published: February 27, 2017
- Publisher: Norstedts förlag
- Publication place: Sweden
- English publication date: November 5, 2019
- Pages: 301
- Awards: August Prize (2017)
- Preceded by: En storm kom från paradiset (lit. A Storm Blew in From Paradise) (2015)

They Will Drown in their Mothers' Tears (Swedish: De kommer att drunkna i sina mödrars tårar) is a 2017 novel by Swedish author Johannes Anyuru. It won the 2017 August Prize for Fiction. An English translation by Saskia Vogel was published in 2019.
