= Margareta Ekström =

Swedish poet and writer (1930–2021)

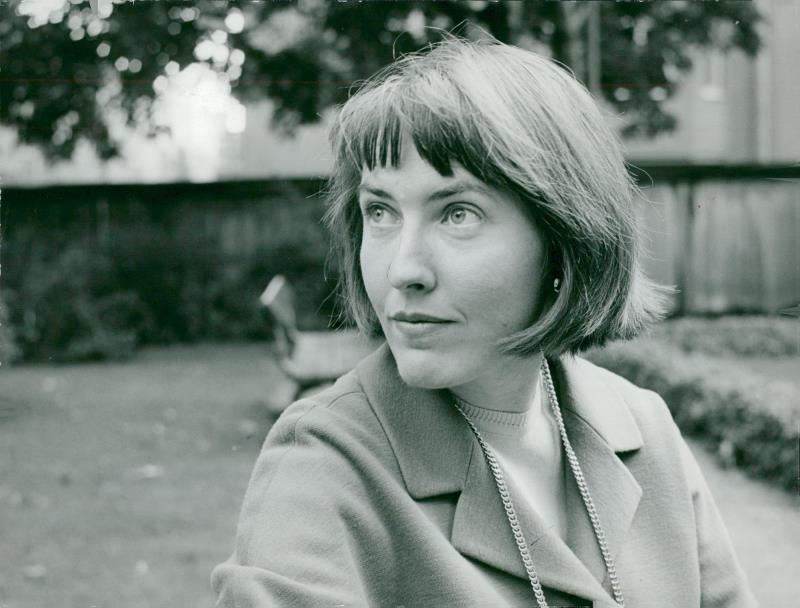
- Born: Sigrid Margareta Ekström; 23 April 1930
- Died: 12 December 2021 (aged 91)
- Occupations: Poet, novelist, children's writer, literary critic and film critic
- Spouse: Carl-Eric Nordberg (1954-1969)
- Children: Johanna Ekström
- Awards: Dobloug Prize (1977)

Sigrid Margareta Ekström (23 April 1930 – 12 December 2021) was a Swedish poet, novelist, translator, children's writer, literary critic and film critic.

== Biography ==
Ekström was born in Stockholm in 1930, to Harald Ekström and wife Sigrid Lagervall. She was married to Carl-Eric Nordberg from 1954 to 1969. In the 1960s, she met the writer Per Wästberg and they had a long relationship together that eventually ended. With Wästberg, she had two children; Johanna Ekström (d. 2022), who was also a writer, and Jakob Wästberg, an entrepreneur. In 1996, Ekström suffered a debilitating stroke, and was unable to write, read, or speak, afterwards. She died on 12 December 2021, at the age of 91.

== Career ==
Ekström had a Bachelor's degree and was a literary critic for Expressen from 1961 to 1983, and a worked at Sydsvenskan from 1974 to 1982. During her life, she held several positions in cultural institutions in Sweden, including membership of the Swedish Film Review Council (1960–1967), the Radio Board (1967–1970), as a board member of the Swedish Film Industry (1974–1977) and vice-chairperson of Svenska PEN (1968–1981). She was also a board member of the Swedish Institute (1979–1983) and member of the Bonniernämnden (1971–1985).

== Works ==
Ekström made her literary debut in 1960 with the short story collection Aftnar i S:t Petersburg. in 1973, she wrote a book addressed to her daughter, titled Ord till Johanna (Words to Johanna). in 1990, she published a collection of poetry titled Skärmar (Screens) to critical acclaim. She notably translated several of Virginia Woolf's books into Swedish, including Orlando, and several stories.

== Awards ==
- 1964 – Albert Bonnier Scholarship Fund for Younger and Newer Writers
- 1970 – Literature Promotion Scholarship
- 1972 – Vi Magazine Literature Prize
- 1977 – Dobloug Prize
- 1989 – Gun and Olof Engqvist Scholarship
- 1993 – Golden Pen from the Gastronomic Academy
- 1997 – The Nine Winter Prize
- 1998 – Litteris et Artibus
- 2000 – Signe Ekblad-Eldh Prize
