= Johannes Anyuru =

Swedish poet and author (born 1979)

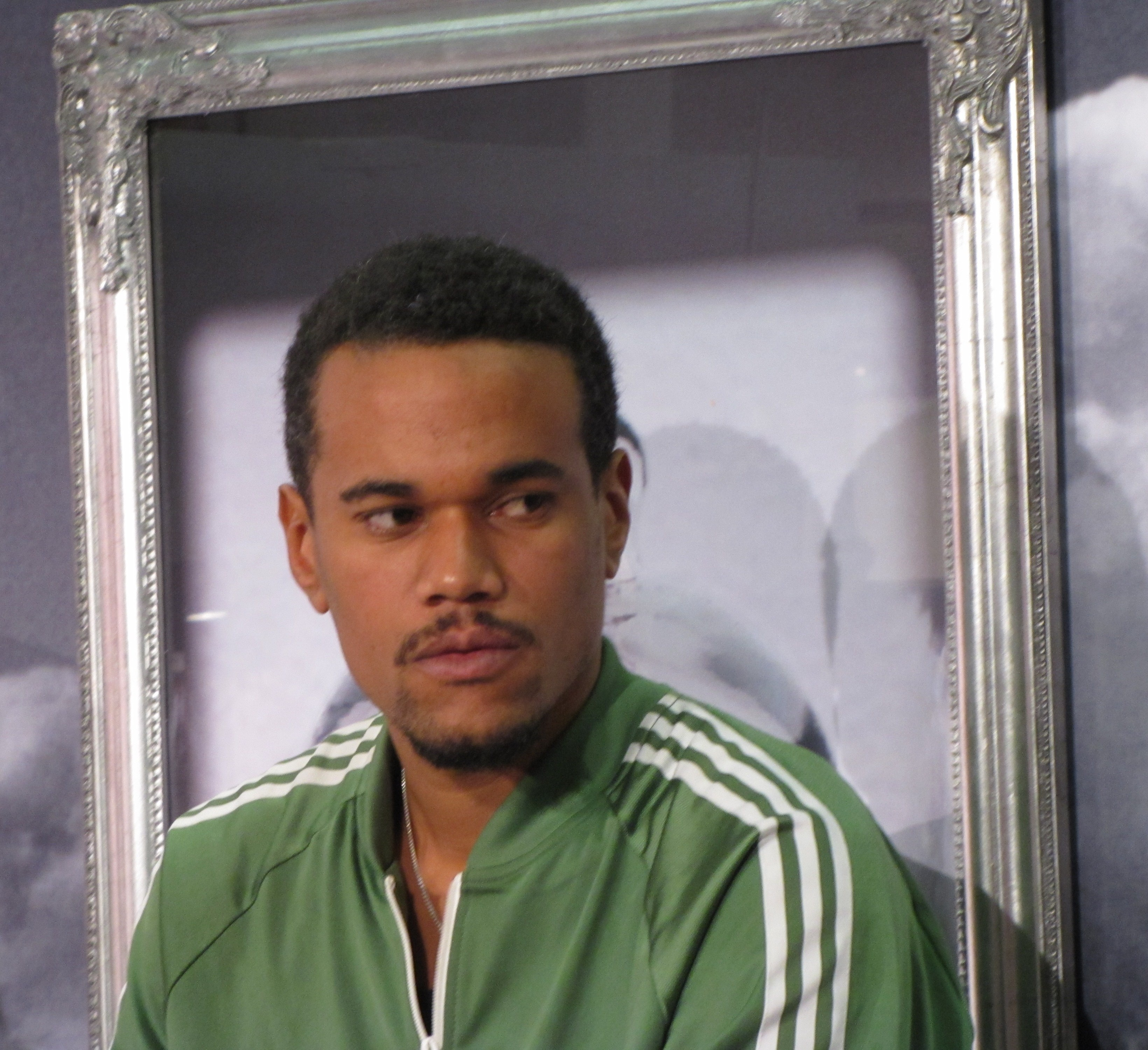
- Johannes Anyuru in 2010.
- Born: 1979 (age 46–47); Borås, Sweden
- Writing career
- Period: 2003–present
- Notable work: Städerna inuti Hall

Johannes Anyuru (born 1979) is a Swedish poet and author.

== Biography ==
Anyuru was born in Borås. His father is from Uganda and his mother is Swedish.

He debuted in 2003 with Det är bara gudarna som är nya (Only the Gods Are New), a poetry collection. In this collection of poems Anyuru used Homer's epic Iliad as a background and inspiration for the portrayal of immigrant neighborhoods. A place that is often mentioned in his poetry is the area around Mörners road in Växjö, where Anyuru lived as a child. Reviews of this book linked his style to both older contemporary Swedish poets as Göran Sonnevi or Tomas Tranströmer, and hip hop band The Latin Kings. Anyurus second poetry collection, Omega, is a much more downbeat since it deals with the loss of a close friend to cancer. Anyurus third collection, Städerna inuti Hall (The Cities Inside Hall) was published in 2009 and describes sad socio-political landscape.

His fourth book Skulle jag dö under andra himlar (If I Were to Die Under Other Skies) is not a poetry book, but prose.

He has also worked with spoken word as part of the group Broken Word and a touring performance with the National Swedish Touring Theatre called Abstrakt rap. Both projects has been released as CD's.

In December 2009 he debuted with his first play Förvaret (The Detention Centre), at the Gothenburg City Theatre, co-written with Aleksander Motturi.

During the summer of 2010, he was one of several hosts of the radio program Sommar.

In 2024, Anyuru published a new book in support of Gaza titled 'The Fact'. In the book, Anyuru weaves in poems by Palestinian poets who were killed in the bombings.

== Bibliography ==
- Det är bara gudarna som är nya (poetry collection, 2003)
- Omega (poetry collection, 2005)
- Städerna inuti Hall (poetry collection, 2009)
- Skulle jag dö under andra himlar (novel, 2010)
- En storm kom från paradiset (novel, 2012)
- A Storm Blew in from Paradise (novel, 2015; translated into English by Rachel Willson-Broyles, 2019)
- De kommer att drunkna i sina mödrars tårar (novel, 2017)
- They Will Drown in their Mothers' Tears (novel, 2017; translated into English by Saskia Vogel, 2019)

== Honours ==
- Nöjesguiden Magazine award for best read 2003
- Guldprinsen prize 2003
- Kallebergers scholarship 2005
- Spingo-scholarship 2005
- Augustpriset nominee 2012, winner 2017
