= Oneworld Publications =

British book publishing company

- Founded: 1986; 40 years ago
- Founders: Novin Doostdar and Juliet Mabey
- Country of origin: United Kingdom
- Headquarters location: Bloomsbury Street; London, WC1
- Distribution: Macmillan Distribution (UK); Faber (UK, Europe, Middle East and China); Bloomsbury Publishing (Australia); Jonathan Ball Publishers (South Africa); HarperCollins India (India); Penguin Random House (Singapore); Simon & Schuster (U.S.)
- Publication types: Books
- No. of employees: 23
- Official website: oneworld-publications.com

Oneworld Publications is a British independent publishing firm founded in 1986 by Novin Doostdar and Juliet Mabey originally to publish accessible non-fiction by experts and academics for the general market. Based in London, it later added a literary fiction list (in 2009) and both a children's list (Rock the Boat, 2015) and an upmarket crime list (Point Blank, 2016), and now publishes across a wide range of subjects, including history, politics, current affairs, popular science, religion, philosophy, and psychology, as well as literary fiction, crime fiction and suspense, and children's titles.

== History ==
Oneworld Publications was founded in 1986 by Novin Doostdar and Juliet Mabey, who had met as students in the 1970s and subsequently married; the company's name reflects their international approach to publishing with global values, initially producing non-fiction "with a focus on bold, intelligent non-fiction across the humanities".

In 2009, Oneworld launched a literary fiction list to focus on publishing novels from around the world. The list has received several prizes and award nominations, among them winning the Man Booker Prize for two years running: in 2015 with A Brief History of Seven Killings by Marlon James, the first Jamaican to win the award, and in 2016 with The Sellout by Paul Beatty, who became the first American winner of the prize. In 2023, Paul Lynch became the third Oneworld author to win the Booker Prize with his novel Prophet Song. In 2019, An American Marriage by Tayari Jones won the Women's Prize for Fiction, and in 2022 Tess Gunty's The Rabbit Hutch won the inaugural Waterstones Debut Fiction Prize.

Further awards include the longlisting of A Cupboard Full of Coats by Yvvette Edwards, a debut British novelist, in 2011 for the Man Booker Prize and it was shortlisted in 2012 for the Commonwealth Book Prize. Reasons She Goes to the Woods by Deborah Kay Davies was longlisted for the Baileys Women's Prize for Fiction in 2014, as well as being shortlisted for the Encore Award in 2015. Also in 2015, Diane Cook's Man V. Nature was shortlisted for the Guardian First Book Award, Ishmael's Oranges by Claire Hajaj was shortlisted for the Authors' Club First Novel Award and the Jewish Quarterly-Wingate Literary Prize. In 2018, Grace by Paul Lynch won the Kerry Group Irish Novel of the Year, and was shortlisted for the Walter Scott Prize for Historical Fiction and the William Saroyan International Prize for Writing, and the following year Orchid & the Wasp by Caoilinn Hughes won the Collyer Bristow Prize and was shortlisted for the Butler Literary Award, and the Hearst Big Book Award, and was longlisted for the Authors' Club Best First Novel Award and the International DUBLIN Literary Award. On the crime side, Lola by Melissa Scrivner Love won the Crime Writers' Association John Creasey New Blood Dagger in 2018 and in 2019, Syd Moore was shortlisted for the CWA Short Story Dagger with her story "Death Becomes Her", from the short-story collection The Twelve Strange Days of Christmas. Also in 2019, Will Dean's Red Snow, the second novel in his Tuva Moodyson Mystery series, won the Capital Crime/Amazon Publishing Readers' Independent Voice Award.

On the translated fiction front, The Meursault Investigation — a multi-award winner in France — was longlisted for the FT Emerging Voices Award and was also shortlisted for the Oxford-Weidenfeld Translation Prize (translated by John Cullen), along with Laurus by Eugene Vodolazkin (translated by Lisa Hayden). Laurus also won the Read Russia Prize for translation in 2016. Umami by Laia Jufresa (translated by Sophie Hughes) was shortlisted for the Best Translated Book Award in the US, and Masha Regina by Vadim Levental (translated by Lisa Hayden) was shortlisted for the Oxford-Weidenfeld Translation Prize. In 2017, Fever Dream by Samanta Schweblin (translated by Megan McDowell) was shortlisted for the Man Booker International Prize, as was Frankenstein in Baghdad by Ahmed Saadawi in 2018 (translated by Jonathan Wright and winner of the International Prize for Arabic Fiction), which went on to win the Golden Tentacle best debut novel award at the Kitschies given to the year's most progressive, intelligent and entertaining works that contain elements of the speculative or fantastic, while Lisa Hayden's translation of Zuleikha by Guzel Yakhina was longlisted for the Warwick Prize for Women in Translation in 2019.

On the non-fiction side, Oneworld titles have received numerous prestigious prizes and nominations. In 2013, The Particle at the End of the Universe by Sean Carroll won the Royal Society Winton Prize, for which Mary Roach's Gulp was also shortlisted the following year; Greg Grandin's The Empire of Necessity was shortlisted for the Samuel Johnson Prize, while Serhii Plokhy's The Last Empire won the Pushkin House Russian Book Prize for 2015, and the same year saw a double shortlisting for the FT/McKinsey Business Book of the Year for The Rise of the Robots by Martin Ford and Unfinished Business by Anne-Marie Slaughter – and the prize was won by The Rise of the Robots. In 2018, The Billionaire Raj by James Crabtree was shortlisted for the same award, and Black Tudors by Miranda Kaufmann was shortlisted for the Wolfson History Prize in 2018. In 2022 Oneworld published White Torture a non-fiction book by Narges Mohammadi who was named the recipient of the Nobel Peace Prize in 2023. In 2023, Show Me the Bodies by Peter Apps won the Orwell Prize for Political Writing.

The co-founders are followers of the Baháʼí Faith. Regarding the relationship between their work and religious perspective, they have stated:

We felt that there should be a readership for books that presented interfaith and global perspectives on many social and spiritual issues of the time. Obviously, this was very much inspired by an inclusive Baháʼí worldview on many current issues, but we didn’t set out to be a Baháʼí publishing company, since this was well looked after by other Baháʼí-owned publishers.

Originally set up in Oxford, Oneworld bought its first permanent office in Bloomsbury, London, in 2012.

As of 2024, Oneworld publishes more than 100 titles a year, which are distributed worldwide by Macmillan Publishers (MDL) in the UK, by Simon & Schuster in the United States, by Bloomsbury Publishing in Australia, by Faber in Europe and the Middle East, by HarperCollins in India, by Jonathan Ball in South Africa, and by a variety of regional distributors in Latin America and other territories.

=== Imprints ===
In 2015, Oneworld launched "Rock the Boat", a list of fiction and non-fiction for children and young adults 0–19, and in 2016 launched a literary crime list, "Point Blank". In 2017, Oneworld set up Oneworld Academic. In 2021, Oneworld launched an upmarket book club fiction list, "Magpie".

== Awards ==
In 2016, Oneworld won the Independent Publisher of the Year Award at the British Book Industry Awards.

In March 2016, Oneworld also won the Ruth Killick Publicity Trade Publisher of the Year Award at the 2016 IPG Independent Publishing Awards.

Oneworld received the Alison Morrison Diversity Award at the 2017 IPG Independent Publishing Awards.

In May 2017, Juliet Mabey, publisher and co-founder of Oneworld, won the Editor of the Year Award at the British Book Industry Awards.

In 2023, Oneworld again won the Independent Publisher of the Year Award at the British Book Awards.
