= Linnea Axelsson =

Swedish Sámi writer (born 1980)

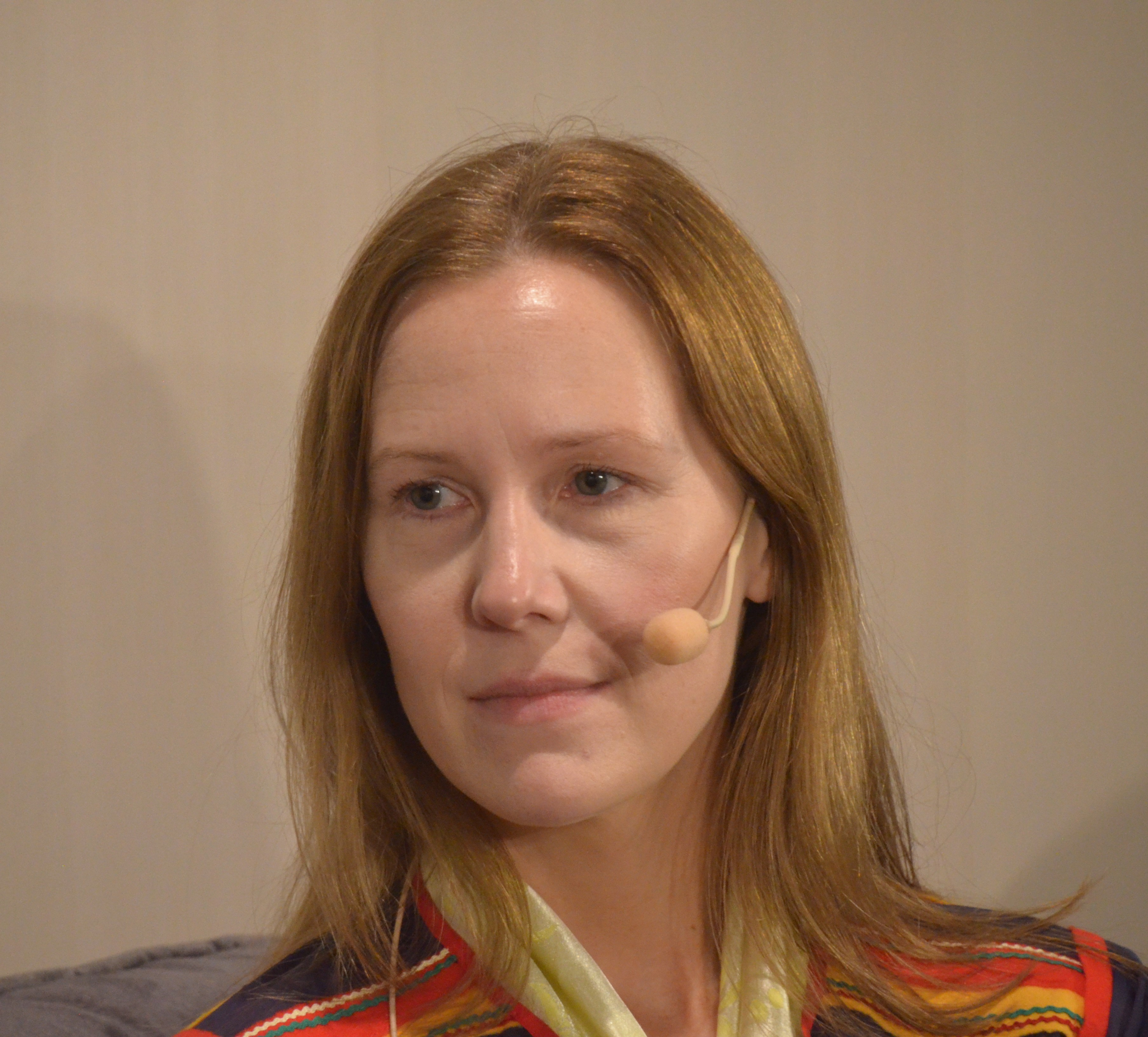
- Linnea Axelsson, 2024
- Born: 1980 (age 45–46); Porjus, Sweden
- Education: Umeå University
- Occupations: Art scholar and writer
- Awards: Svenska Dagbladet Literature Prize (2018); August Prize (2018)

Linnea Axelsson (born 1980) is a Swedish Sámi art scholar, novelist and poet.

Axelsson was born in Porjus (Bårjås in Lule Sami) in Jokkmokk Municipality. She made her literary debut in 2010 with the novel Tvillingsmycket. Her epic poem Ædnan from 2018 earned her the Svenska Dagbladet Literature Prize, as well as the August Prize for best fiction in 2018. Its 2024 English translation by Saskia Vogel was longlisted for the National Book Award for Translated Literature.
