= René Tavernier (poet) =

French poet and philosopher (1915–1989)

René Tavernier (21 May 1915 – 16 December 1989) was a French poet and philosopher.

Tavernier published his first poems before World War II in the New French Review, and was immediately noticed by Jean Wahl. In turn, this brought him recognition by Emmanuel Levinas and Jean-Paul Sartre. A friend of Vladimir Jankélévitch, he was held at Drancy internment camp. After escaping, he fled to the United States.

Joining writers and journalists during the war led him to Lyon in the neighborhood where he directed Montchat Confluences - A journal on "Literature and Arts" - founded by Jacques Aubenque between July 1941 and 1943. It is in this review, which had as the "original purpose" to "bring together writers and ideas from diverse backgrounds in the service of humanism" that he published the poems of Pierre Emmanuel, Max Jacob, Henri Michaux, Paul Éluard and Louis Aragon, one of whose poems was also the cause of the suspension of the magazine for a few months. Firmly committed to the Resistance, René Tavernier organized clandestine meetings at his home until the end of 1943 with Elsa Triolet and Louis Aragon.

His son was the film director Bertrand Tavernier.

== Notes ==
Non-profit organization positions
Preceded by Francis King	International President of PEN International; May–Nov 1989	Succeeded by Per Wästberg (interim)
