= Frank Perry (translator) =

English translator

- Born: Frank Gabriel Perry; Brighton, Sussex, UK
- Occupation: Translator

Frank Perry is an English translator from Brighton, Sussex.

== Career ==
Perry's work primarily focuses on translating the works of Swedish playwrights, poets, and novelists into English. Works translated include the ITV series Marcella, Caterina Pascual Söderbaum's The Oblique Place, Axel Lidén's On Sheep: Diary of a Swedish Shepherd, and Hans Hayden's Modernism as Institution.

== Recognition ==
- Swedish Academy Prize for the introduction of Swedish literature abroad (2004, won)
- Göran O Eriksson Prize for drama translation, Writer's Guild of Sweden (2010, won)
- Oxford-Weidenfeld Translation Prize for Lina Wolff’s Bret Easton Ellis and the Other Dogs (2017, won)
- Bernard Shaw Prize for best literary translation from Swedish, The Society of Authors (2019, won)
