= Vadim Levental =

Russian editor and writer (born 1981)

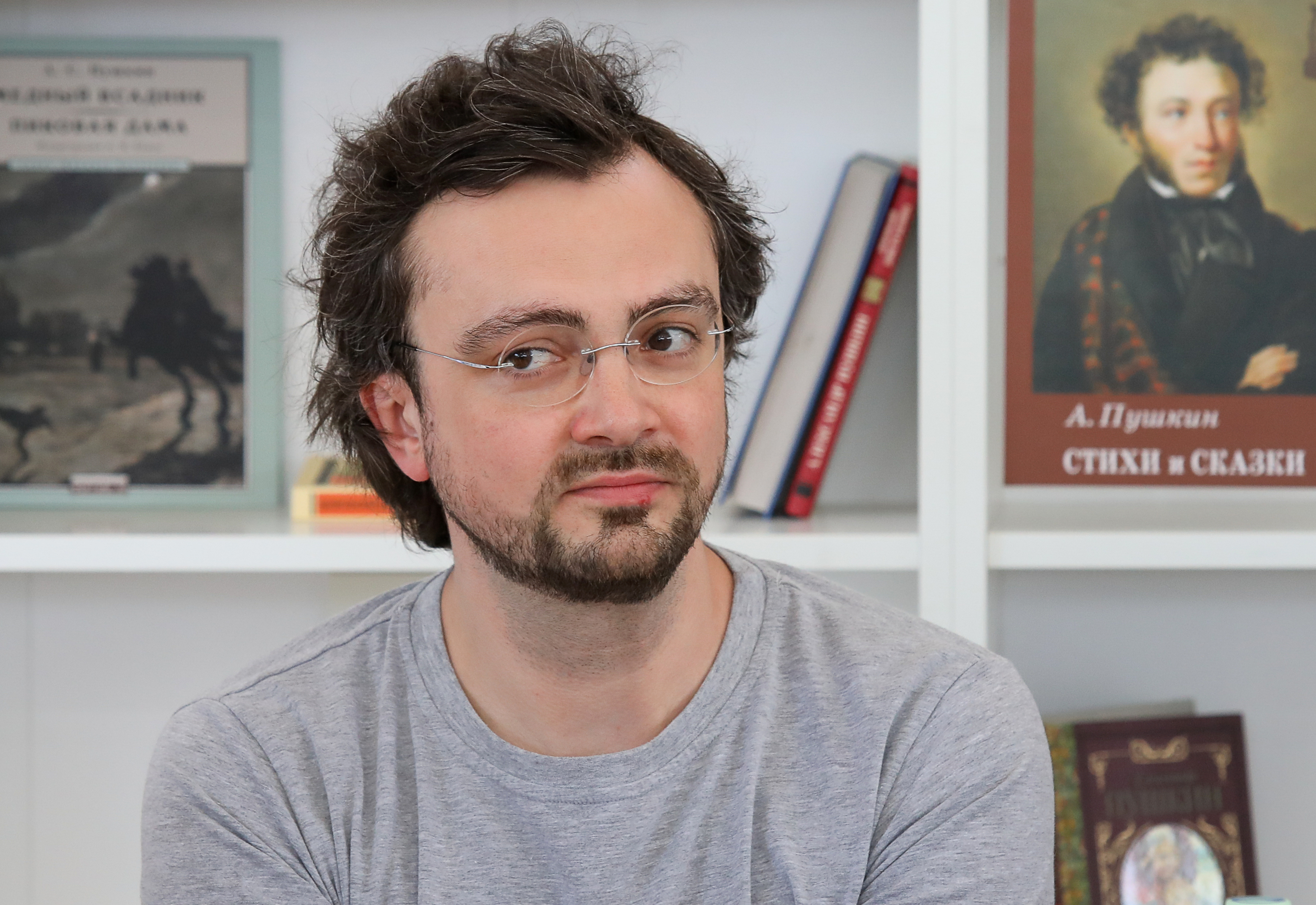
- Levental in 2019
- Born: 25 October 1981 (age 44); Leningrad, Russian SFSR, Soviet Union
- Occupations: Writer; editor

Vadim Levental (born 25 October 1981) is a Russian editor and writer.

He was an editor at Limbus-Press publishing house from 2007 to 2017, and executive secretary of the National Bestseller literary award from 2014 to 2019.

== Early life ==
Vadim Levental was born in Saint Petersburg. After attending Physics and Mathematics School No. 30 and Secondary School No. 27 he studied Russian Literature at Saint Petersburg State University, specialising in Literary Criticism and Editing.

== Career ==
In 2011, Levental wrote the idea of "Literary Matrix" collection of short stories mentioned by Neva magazine as "perhaps the most successful literary projects of the last few decades".

Levental's debut novel, Masha Regina, was nominated for the Russian Booker Prize and shortlisted by the Big Book award jury. According to The Guardian, it is "a postmodern bildungsroman... filled with allusions to Russian literature and German philosophy".

An English-language translation of Masha Regina was published in the United Kingdom by Oneworld Publications in 2016. In August 2016, the novel represented Russia at the Edinburgh International Book Festival.

Some critics consider Levental as one of the most prominent young Russian writers and even "the unique hope of Russian novella", referring to his second book, a short-story collection entitled House of Fears.

== Quotes ==
"No matter who authored the Book of Genesis, he was just as wrong as the author of Capital: labor’s not a curse and not a joy, but a gift to the proletariat exiled from a futile paradise (because in the final reckoning, any tools of labor belong to God) and labor’s the only option for escaping existential horror". Vadim Levental, "Masha Regina", translated by Lisa Hayden, OneWorld Publications, UK, 2016.

== See also ==
- List of people from Saint Petersburg
- List of Russian writers
