= Karolina Ramqvist =

Swedish journalist and writer

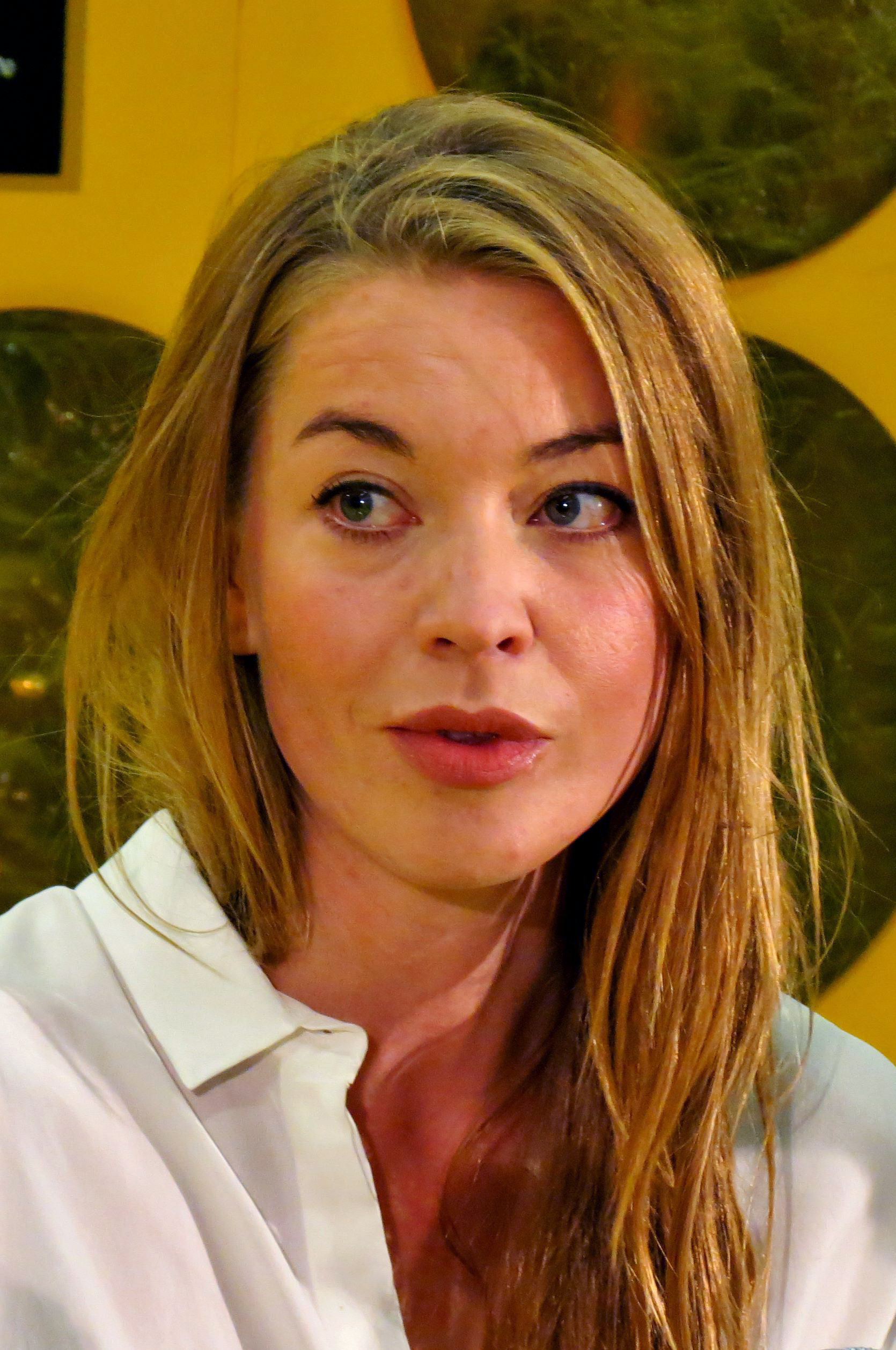
- Karolina Ramqvist in 2013
- Born: 8 November 1976 (age 49); Gothenburg, Sweden
- Citizenship: Swedish
- Occupation: Journalist
- Writing career
- Notable awards: 2015 PO Enquist Literary Prize

Annika Karolina Virtanen Ramqvist (born 8 November 1976) is a prominent Swedish journalist and best-selling author.

Ramqvist's novels explore "contemporary issues of sexuality, commercialization, isolation and belonging". The Swedish newspaper Expressen said her fourth novel Den vita staden (published in Swedish in 2015 and later in English translation by Saskia Vogel for Black Cat/Grove Atlantic in 2017) "cemented Karolina Ramqvist's position as one of Sweden's most interesting authors." Ramqvist wrote the screenplay for the short film Cupcake (2014), which won the Short Grand Prix at the Warsaw Film Festival and Best Film at the Sleepwalkers International Short Film Festival in Tallinn. In 2015, Ramqvist won the PO Enquist Literary Prize, which is "given to a Nordic author who according to the jury has great artistic value and the potential to reach an international audience but has not yet had his or her international break through."

Ramqvist has been the editor-in-chief for the magazine Arena and a columnist at Dagens Nyheter. She became known after she published a private letter from Ulf Lundell in the Swedish feminist anthology Fittstim (1999).

She is married to journalist Fredrik Virtanen.

== Bibliography ==
- När svenska pojkar började dansa [When Swedish Boys Started Dancing], Stockholm : Bokförlaget DN, 1997, ISBN 91-7588-178-0.
- More Fire, Stockholm : Modernista, 2002, ISBN 91-88748-15-4.
- Nån där? Texter om framtidens kommunikation [Is anyone there? Texts on future communication], Stockholm : Premiss förlag, 2008, ISBN 978-91-85343-20-1.
- Flickvännen [The Girlfriend], Stockholm : Wahlström & Widstrand, 2009, ISBN 978-91-46-21995-8.
- Alltings början [The Beginning], Stockholm : Norstedts, 2012, ISBN 978-91-1-304129-2.
- Fredskåren [Peace Corps], Stockholm : Myrios Novellförlag / Natur & Kultur, 2012, ISBN 978-91-7534-007-4.
- Farväl, mitt kvinnofängelse [Farewell, My Female Prison], Stockholm : Novellix, 2013, ISBN 978-91-7-589007-4
- Den vita staden [The White City], Stockholm : Norstedts, 2015, ISBN 978-91-1-306433-8
  - English translation by Saskia Vogel as The White City, New York : Black Cat/Grove Atlantic, 2017, ISBN 978-08-0-212595-8
- Det är natten [It Is the Night], Stockholm : Norstedts, 2016, ISBN 978-91-1-307488-7
  - Extract published in English translation by Saskia Vogel as 'The Writer as Public Figure vs. The Writer Who Actually Writes', New York : The Literary Hub, 27 February 2017
- Björnkvinnan [The Bear Woman], Stockholm : Norstedts, 2019, ISBN 978-91-1-308449-7
  - English translation by Saskia Vogel as The Bear Woman, Toronto : Coach House Books, 2022, ISBN 978-15-5-245431-2
- Den första boken [The First Book], Stockholm : Albert Bonniers Förlag, 2024, ISBN 978-91-0-080131-1

== Prizes and distinctions ==
- 1999 – Swedish Magazine Publishers Association's Media Rookie of the Year
- 2002 – SKAM:s Debut Prize for More Fire
- 2003 – Sweden's Essay Fund Prize for the essay "Den globala terapin" (Global Therapy) (Arena 3/2003)
- 2009 – Vi Magazine's Literary Prize for Flickvännen
- 2013 – City of Stockholm Cultural Stipendium for Alltings början
- 2015 – P.O. Enquist Literary Prize for Den vita staden
- 2015 – Albert Bonniers Stipendium Fund for Swedish Authors for Den vita staden
