= Johanna Ekström =

Swedish author and artist (1970–2022)

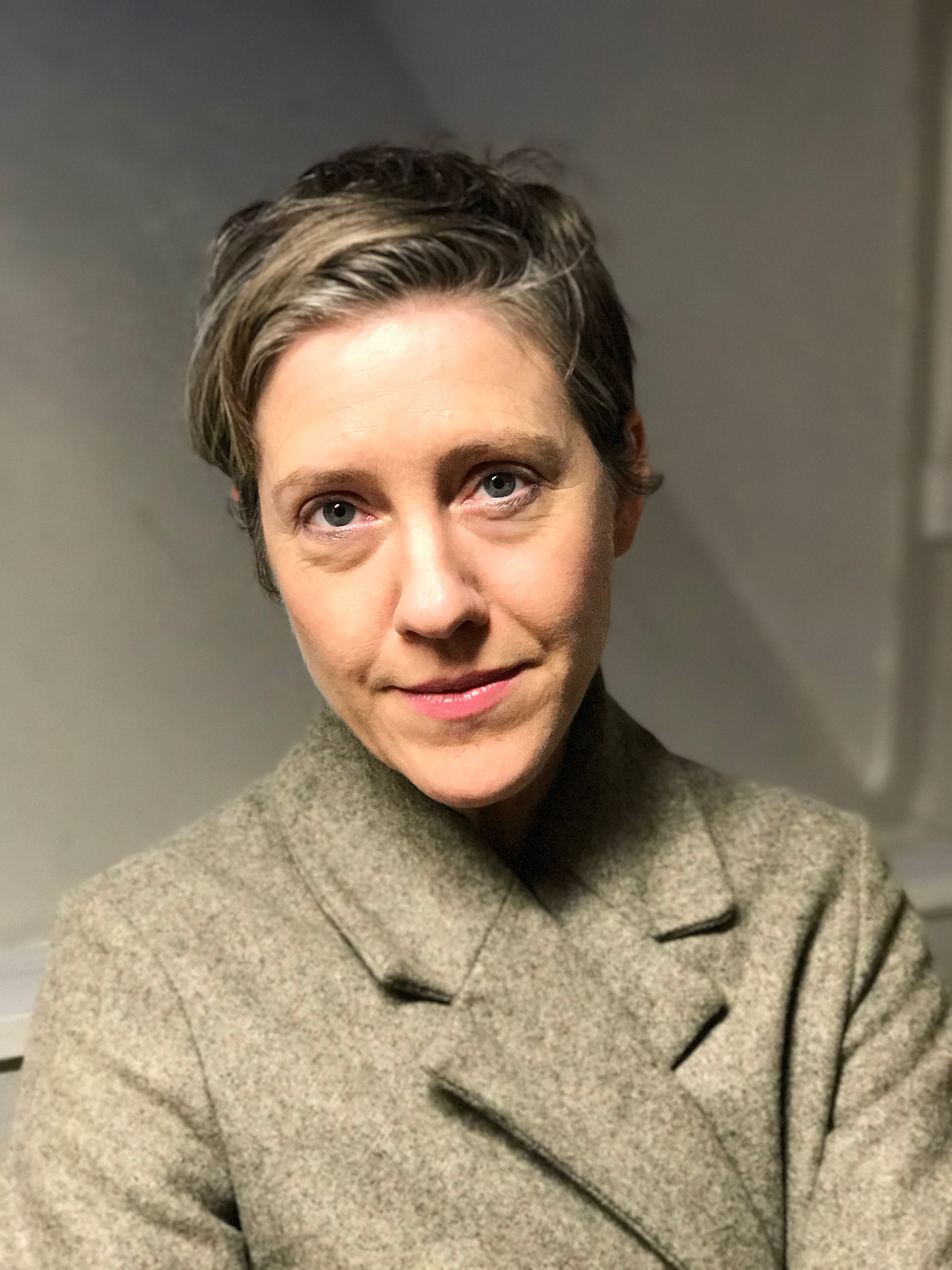
- Ekström in 2017
- Born: Johanna Ulrika Ekström; 9 May 1970
- Died: 13 April 2022 (aged 51)
- Occupations: Author, artist
- Notable work: Skiffer 1993.
- Children: 1
- Parent: Per Wästberg - Margareta Ekström

Johanna Ulrika Ekström (9 May 1970 – 13 April 2022) was a Swedish author and artist.

Ekström made her published debut in 1993 with a collection of poems called Skiffer, and the following year she had her first exhibition at Galleri Charlotte Lund in Stockholm. Ekström published a dozen collections of poems and short stories as well as novels.

== Biography ==
Ekström grew up in Stockholm, the daughter of the authors Per Wästberg and Margareta Ekström.

She made her writing debut in 1993 with the collection of poems Skiffer ("Slate"), and continued to publish poetry during the 1990s. After the turn of the millennium in 2000, she began writing short stories, novels, and diary entries. Her first collection of short stories, What Do I Know About Strength, was published in 2000. Her first published novel was Farewell Relay (2004), which was followed by the short story collection Look, she crawls. Ekström became better known as a writer through his autobiographical works. The autobiographical If You Stay in the Sun (2012) describes growing up in a bourgeois and intellectual home on Djurgården. Her previous diaries were published in 2016 under the title Diary 1996–2002. Her book The Sentences from 2000 depicts the relationship with her mother, after her mother had difficulty speaking due to a stroke in the 1990s.

As an artist, Johanna Ekström had her first exhibition at Galleri Charlotte Lund in 1994. Her work as a visual artist was closely linked to her poetry. In 2012, she had her first exhibition at Björkholmen Gallery and was subsequently represented by the gallery. She also exhibited at the Gothenburg Art Museum and Färgfabriken on Liljeholmen.

== Personal life ==
For a time, she was cohabiting with author Tomas Lappalainen and had a daughter with him.

Ekström died of cancer on 13 April 2022, at the age of 51.

Following her death, a final book, drawing on her 13 handwritten notebooks was completed by Ekström's best friend, the editor and author Sigrid Rausing; translated into English as And the Walls Became the World All Around, it was described in The Guardian as "a brave and beautiful memoir of Ekström’s final two years, and a moving meditation on grief and friendship". The book was shortlisted for the 2025 Warwick Prize for Women in Translation.

== Bibliography ==
- Skiffer (1993)
- Vitöga: dikter (1994)
- Rachels hus: dikter (1995)
- Fiktiva dagboken (1997)
- Gå förlorad: dikter (1998)
- Brott, with Erik Pauser (1998)
- Vad vet jag om hållfasthet (2000)
- Jag ska vakna stående (2003)
- Avskedsstafetten (2004)
- Titta, hon kryper (2006)
- Det enda främmande (2008)
- Om man håller sig i solen (2012)
- Dagbok 1996-2002 (2016)
- Meningarna (2020)
- Och väggarna förvandlades till världen runtomkring (2023)
