= Valérie Rouzeau =

French poet and translator

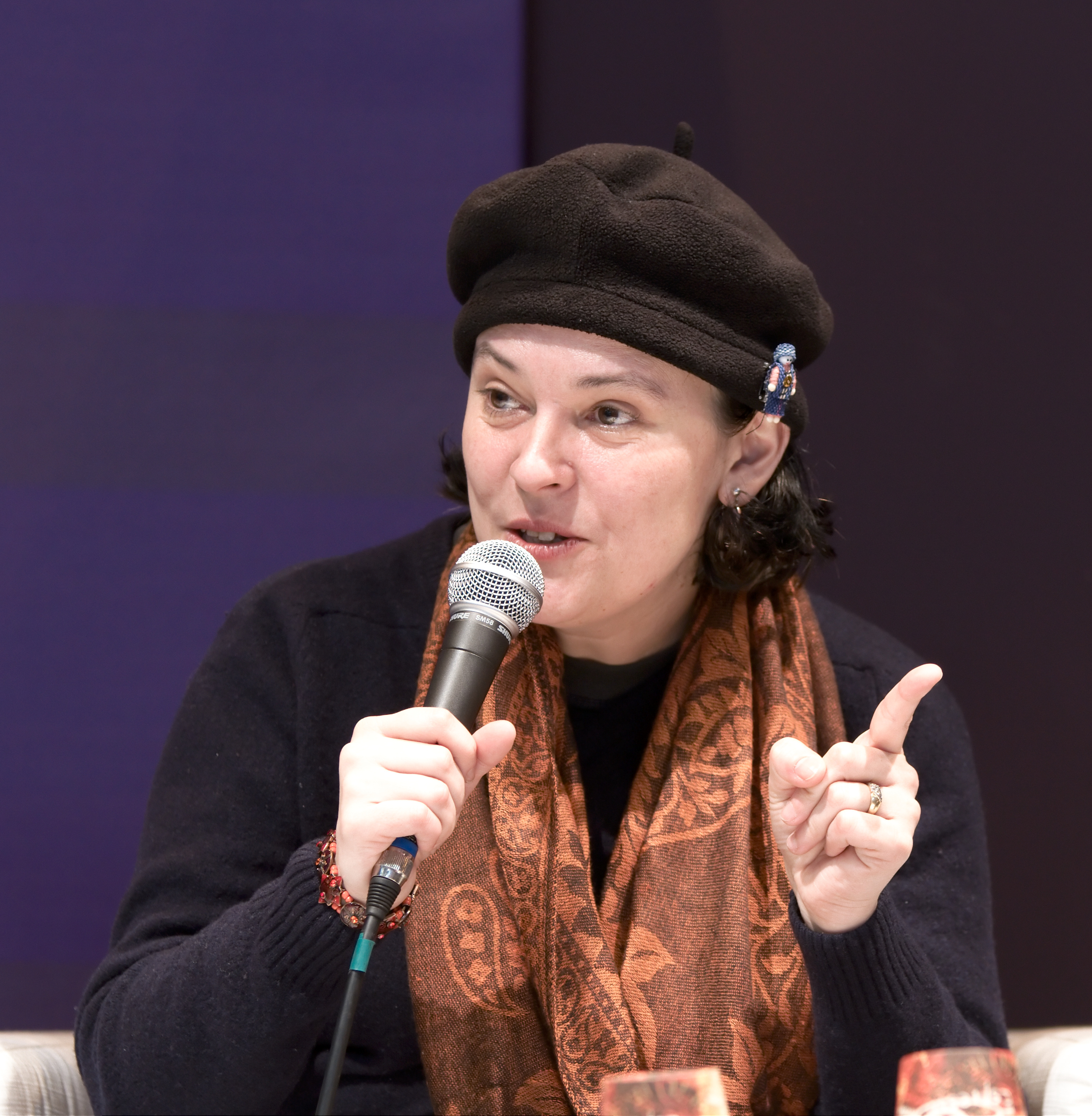
Valérie Rouzeau at Salon du livre de Paris in March 2010

Valérie Rouzeau (born 22 August 1967, in Cosne-sur-Loire), is a French poet and translator.

She is the eldest of a family of seven children. She holds a Master of literary translation. She received the Prix Guillaume Apollinaire for Poetry in 2012 for the collection Vrouz. She currently lives in Nevers (Nièvre).

Some of her works have been translated into English by Susan Wicks which have won awards including the 2010 Scott Moncrieff Prize for Pas Revoir (Cold Spring in Winter), and the 2014 Oxford-Weidenfeld Translation Prize for Vrouz (Talking Vrouz).
