= Per Wästberg =

Swedish writer

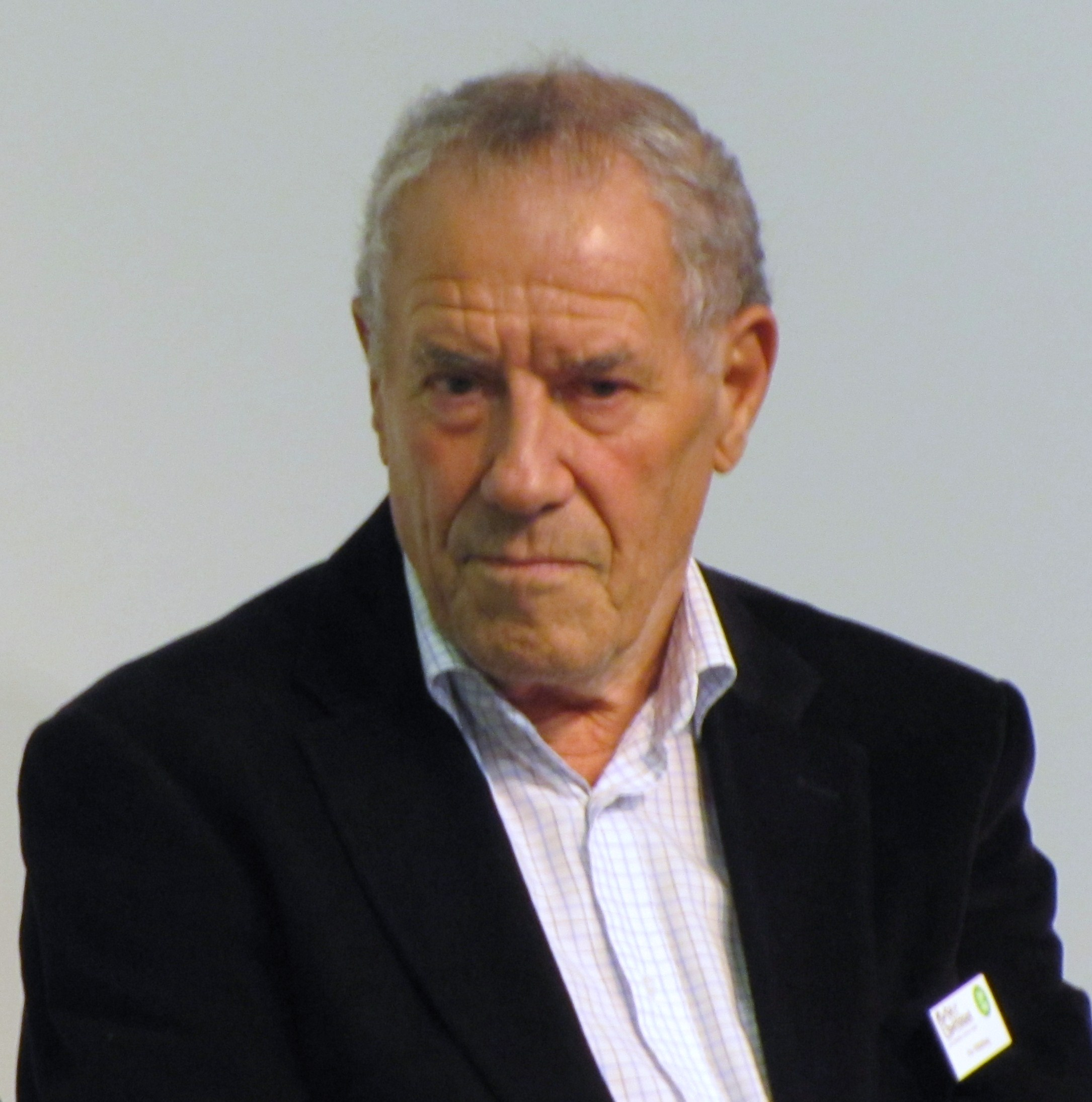
- Wästberg in 2010
- Born: 20 November 1933 (age 92); Stockholm, Sweden
- Education: Uppsala University; Östra Real
- Occupations: writer, journalist, poet
- Employer: Dagens Nyheter
- Spouses: Anna-Lena Wästberg (m. 1955–1974); Anita Theorell (m. 1992–2005)
- Partner: Margareta Ekström
- Children: Johanna Ekström
- Parent: Erik Wästberg (father)
- Relatives: Olle Wästberg (brother)

President of PEN International (Interim)
- In office November 1989 – May 1990
- Preceded by: René Tavernier
- Succeeded by: György Konrád

Member of the Swedish Academy (Seat No. 12)
- Incumbent
- Assumed office 20 December 1997
- Preceded by: Werner Aspenström

Per Erik Wästberg (born 20 November 1933) is a Swedish writer and a member of the Swedish Academy since 1997.

Wästberg was born in Stockholm, son of Erik Wästberg and his wife Greta née Hirsch, and holds a degree in literature from Uppsala University. He was editor-in-chief of Sweden's largest daily newspaper, Dagens Nyheter 1976–1982, and has been a contributor since 1953. He is an older brother of Olle Wästberg.

Wästberg was a member of Amnesty International for many years and was a president of International PEN.

He has been a member of the Nobel Prize in Literature committee since 1999, chair between 2005 and 2019.

== Literary work ==
Per Wästberg has published numerous books including travel literature with a particular interest in Africa, novels, poetry collections and biographical books. He is also a prominent chronicler of his native Stockholm.

Wästberg wrote a biographical novel about Anders Sparrman, a Swedish natural scientist, who, according to Wästberg, was the first zoologist to study the two African rhinoceros species. Wästberg describes Sparrman as having made significant scientific discoveries and cartography, without achieving fame.

== Political works ==
Wästberg has campaigned extensively for human rights. He was President of the PEN International from 1979 until 1986 and founder of the Swedish section of Amnesty International (1963). In connection with this, he was involved in the anti-colonial movement. He was especially active in the struggle against Apartheid in South Africa, where he became a close friend of Nadine Gordimer.

He was expelled by the government in Rhodesia in 1959, and after publication of his anti-Apartheid book På svarta listan (On the Black List) in 1960, he was banned from entering both Rhodesia and South Africa. He returned to South Africa only in 1990, after the release from jail of Nelson Mandela.

In August 2022 Wästberg resigned from Amnesty International following controversy about one of Amnesty's reports in relation to the 2022 Russian invasion, which in addition to blaming Russia for the invasion also stated that Ukrainian government had a responsibility not to place troops and weapons in civilian locations, to avoid putting them into harm in Amnesty's interpretation of international humanitarian law. "I have been a member for over 60 years. It is with a heavy heart that, due to Amnesty's statements regarding the war in Ukraine, I am ending a long and fruitful engagement," he said.

== List of published works ==
=== Novels ===
- Pojke med såpbubblor (1949)
- Ett gammalt skuggspel (1952)
- Halva kungariket (1955)
- Arvtagaren (1958)
- Vattenslottet (1968)
- Luftburen (1969)
- Jordmånen (1972)
- Eldens skugga (1986)
- Bergets källa (1987)
- Ljusets hjärta (1991)
- Vindens låga (1993)
- Anders Sparrmans resa: en biografisk roman (2008)

=== Poetry ===
- Tio atmosfärer (1963)
- Enkel resa (1964)
- En avlägsen likhet (1983)
- Frusna tillgångar (1990)
- Förtöjningar (1995)
- Tre rader (1998)
- Raderingar (1999)
- Fortifikationer (2001)
- Tillbaka i tid (2004)

=== On Africa and the Third World ===
- Förbjudet område (1960)
- På svarta listan (1960)
- Afrika berättar (1961)
- Afrika-ett uppdrag (1976)
- I Sydafrika – resan till friheten (1995)
- Modern afrikansk litteratur (1969)
- Afrikansk poesi (1971)
- Resor, intervjuver, porträtt, politiska analyser från en långvarig vistelse i Sydafrika (1994)

=== Biographies and essays ===
- Ernst och Mimmi, biografi genom brev (1964)
- Alice och Hjördis Två systrar (1994)
- En dag på världsmarknaden (1967)
- Berättarens ögonblick (1977)
- Obestämda artiklar (1981)
- Bestämda artiklar (1982)
- Frukost med Gerard (1992)
- Lovtal (1996)
- Ung mans dagbok (1996)
- Ung författares dagbok (1997)
- Duvdrottningen (1998)
- Edith Whartons hemliga trädgård (2000)
- Övergångsställen (2002)
- Ute i livet : en memoar (1980–1994) (2012)
- Gustaf Adolf Lysholm : diktare, drömmare, servitör – en biografi (2013)
- Per Wästbergs Stockholm (2013)
- Lovord (2014)
- Erik och Margot : en kärlekshistoria (2014)
- Mellanblad (2015)

=== In English ===
- The case against Portugal – Angola and Mozambique (with Anders Ehnmark, 1965)
- Assignments in Africa (1986)

Cultural offices
| Preceded by Werner Aspenström | Swedish Academy, Seat No.12; 1997– | Succeeded by incumbent |
Non-profit organization positions
| Preceded by Mario Vargas Llosa | International President of PEN International; 1979–1986 | Succeeded by Francis King |
| Preceded by René Tavernier | International (Interim) President of PEN International; 1989–1990 | Succeeded by György Konrád |
