= Read Russia Prize =

- Rewards: Up to $10,000 (divided between translator(s) and publishing house(s))
- Established: 2011
- Website: eng.institutperevoda.ru/premiya-chitay-rossiyu/

The Read Russia Prize awards are made every two years for outstanding translations of Russian literature into foreign languages.

== About the prize ==
Established in 2011 by the Institute for Literary Translation, the awards are supported by the Federal Agency for Press and Mass Communication (Rospechat’) and the Boris N. Yeltsin Presidential Center. They are awarded to a translator (or group of translators) for works published in translation by a foreign publisher during the previous two years. There are four categories of awards. The winner(s) receive an award of up to $10,000, divided between the translator(s) of the work and the publishing house(s).The prize aims to popularize works of Russian literature, encourage foreign translators and publishers, and strengthen cultural ties between Russia and other countries.

=== Jury and Board of Trustees ===
The jury for the Read Russia Prize is composed of leading translators, scholars, and literary critics. The Board of Trustees includes well-known Russian government, cultural, and public figures, such as Petr Aven, Naina Yeltsina, Mikhail Piotrovsky, and Natalia Solzhenitsyna.

== First Session 2010–2012 ==
- 19th-C Classic Russian Literature: Victor Gallego Ballesteros's translation of Leo Tolstoy's novel Anna Karenina (Alba)
- 20th-C Russian Literature (pre-1990): John Elsworth's translation of Andrei Bely's novel Petersburg (Pushkin Press)
- Contemporary Russian Literature (post-1990): Hélène Henry-Safier's translation of Dmitrii Bykov's Pasternak (Fayard)
- Poetry: Alessandro Niero's translation of Dmitrii Prigov's Thirty Three Texts (Terra Ferma)

== Second Session 2012–2014 ==
- 19th-C Classic Russian Literature: Alejandro Ariel Gonzales's translation of Fyodor Dostoevsky’s novella The Double (Eterna Cadencia)
- 20th-C Russian Literature (pre-1990): Alexander Nitzberg's translation of Mikhail Bulgakov’s novel Master and Margarita (Galiani Berlin)
- Contemporary Russian Literature (post-1990): Marian Schwartz's translation of Leonid Yuzefovich’s novel Harlequin’s Costume (Glagoslav Publications)
- Poetry: Liu Wenfei's translation of poetry by Alexander Pushkin (China Yuhang Publishing House)

== Third Session 2014–2016 ==
- 19th-C Classic Russian Literature: Joaquin Fernandez-Valdes's translation of Ivan Turgenev's Fathers and Sons (Alba)
- 20th-C Russian Literature (pre-1990): Selma Ancira's translation of stories by 20-C writers (Tsvetaeva, Pasternak, Blok, Gumilev, Mandelstam, Bunin, Bulgakov, and Berberova) titled Paisaje caprichoso de la literatura rusa (Fondo de Cultura Económica)
- Contemporary Russian Literature (post-1990): Lisa Hayden's translation of Eugene Vodolazkin’s Laurus (Oneworld Publications)
- Poetry: Claudia Scandura's translation of Sergei Gandlevsky's Rust and Yellow. Poems of 198–2011 (Gattomerlino)

== Fourth Session 2016–2018 ==
- 19th-C Classic Russian Literature: Marta Sánchez-Nieves's translation of Leo Tolstoy’s Sevastopol Sketches (Alba Editorial)
- 20th-C Russian Literature (pre-1990): Anne Coldefy-Faucard with Geneviève Johannet's translation of Aleksandr Solzhenitsyn’s April 1917 (Fayard)
- Contemporary Russian Literature (post-1990): Oliver Ready's translation of Vladimir Sharov’s The Rehearsals (Dedalus Europe)
- Poetry: Kiril Kadiysky's translation of Fyodor Tyutchev’s Selected Poems (Nov Zlatorog)

=== Read Russia Prize for Russian-English Translation ===
Jury: Kevin M. F. Platt, Donald Rayfield and Anna Summers

- Winner: Robert and Elizabeth Chandler, Anne Marie Jackson, and Irina Steinberg's translation of Teffi's autobiographical Memories: From Moscow to the Black Sea (New York Review Books/Pushkin Press)
- Special Mention: Thomas J. Kitson's translation of Rapture, written by Iliazd's (Ilia Zdanevich) Rapture (Columbia University Press's Russian Library imprint)
- Special Mention: Karetnyk, Maria Bloshteyn, Robert Chandler, Justin Doherty, Boris Dralyuk, Rose France, Dmitri Nabokov, Donald Rayfield, Irina Steinberg, and Anastasia Tolstoy's translation of Russian Émigré Short Stories from Bunin to Yankovsky, edited by Bryan Karetnyk (Penguin Classics)

== Fifth Session 2018–2020 ==
=== Read Russia Prize for Russian-English Translation ===
Jury: Bryan Karetnyk, Muireann Maguire and Anastasia Tolstoy.

Shortlist:

- Betsy Hulick's translation of Alexander Griboedov's Woe from Wit (Columbia University Press/Russian Library)
- Robert and Elizabeth Chandler's translation of Vasily Grossman's Stalingrad (Harvill Secker and New York Review Books)
- Boris Dralyuk, Alex Fleming, and Anne Marie Jackson's translation of Maxim Osipov's Rock, Paper, Scissors (New York Review Books)
- Antony Wood's translation of Alexander Pushkin's Selected Poetry (Penguin Random House)
- Lisa C. Hayden's translation of Guzel Yakhina's Zuleikha (Oneworld)

Winner: Antony Wood's translation of Alexander Pushkin's Selected Poetry (Penguin Random House)

Special Mention: Robert and Elizabeth Chandler's translation of Vasily Grossman's Stalingrad (Harvill Secker and New York Review Books)
