= Lydie Salvayre =

French writer (born 1948)

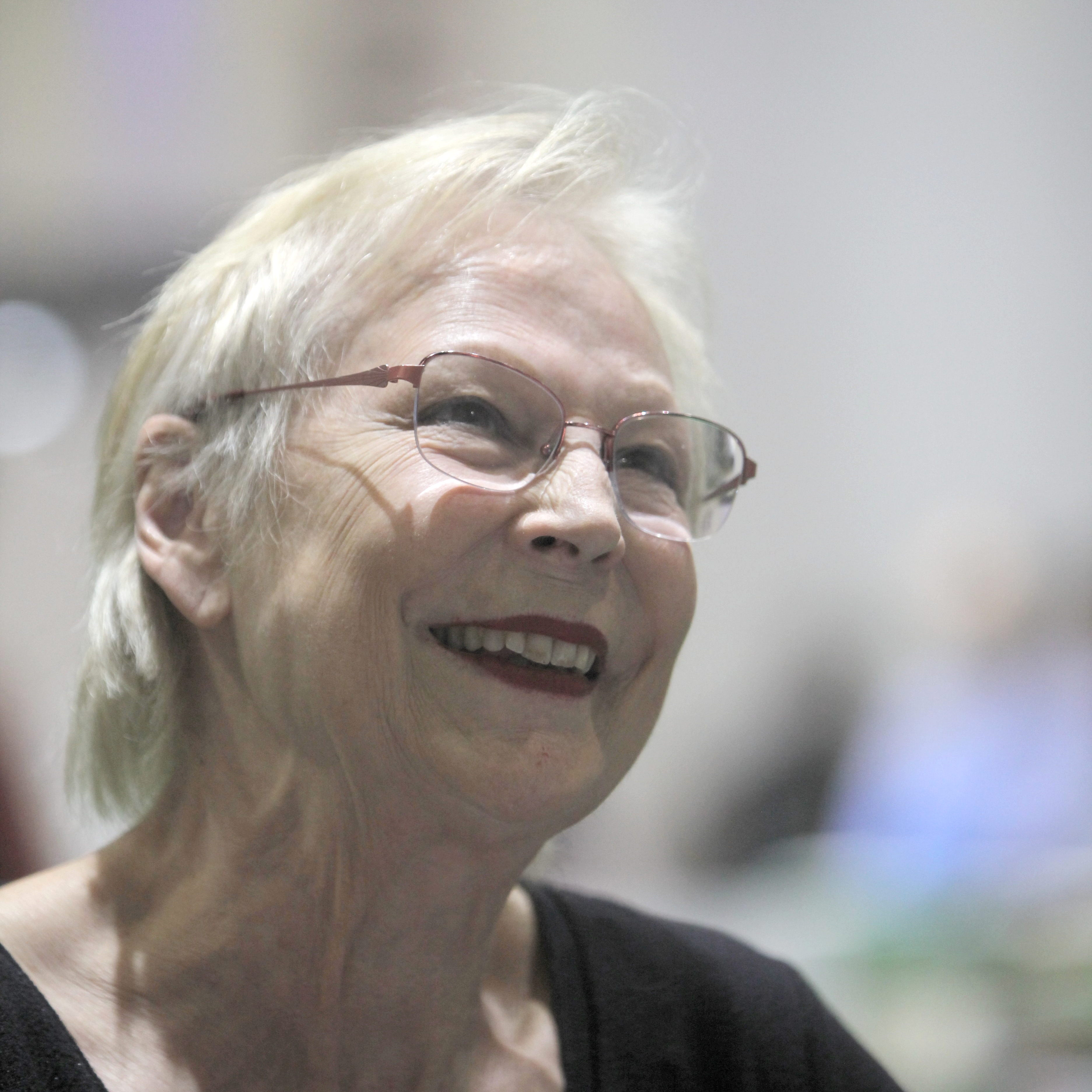
- Lydie Salvayre at the 2019 Geneva book fair
- Born: 15 March 1946; Autainville
- Works: Cry, Mother Spain
- Awards: Prix Décembre (1997); Prix Goncourt (Cry, Mother Spain, 2014); Commandeur des Arts et des Lettres (2015); Officer of the National Order of Merit (2023); (2024); (2022)

Lydie Salvayre (born Lydie Arjona in 1948) is a French writer. Born in the south of France to Republican refugees from the Spanish Civil War, she went on to study medicine in Toulouse and continues to work as a practicing psychiatrist.

She has been awarded the Prix Hermes, the Prix Décembre for her work, and the 2014 Prix Goncourt for Pas pleurer.

== Works ==
- La Déclaration (1990)
- La Vie commune (1991) - translated into English as Everyday Life (Dalkey Archive Press 2006)
- La Médaille (1993) - translated into English as The Award (Four Walls Eight Windows 1997)
- La Puissance des mouches (1995) - translated into English as The Power of Flies (Dalkey Archive Press 2007)
- La Compagnie des spectres (1997) - translated into English as The Company of Ghosts (Dalkey Archive Press 2006)
- Quelques conseils aux élèves huissiers (1997)
- La Conférence de Cintegabelle (1999) - translated into English as The Lecture (Dalkey Archive Press 2005)
- Les Belles âmes (2000)
- Le Vif du vivant (2001)
- Et que les vers mangent le bœuf mort (2002)
- Contre (2002)
- Passage à l'ennemie (2003)
- La méthode Mila (2005)
- Dis pas ça (2006)
- Lumières sur la CCAS. Les activités sociales des salariés de l'énergie (2006, collective work)
- Portrait de l'écrivain en animal domestique (2007)
- Petit traité d'éducation lubrique (2008)
- BW (2009)
- Hymne (2011)
- 7 femmes (2013)
- Pas pleurer (2014, Prix Goncourt); published in English in 2016 by MacLehose Press as Cry, Mother Spain (translated by Ben Faccini).
- Marcher jusqu'au soir (2019)

== Decorations ==
- Commander of the Order of Arts and Letters (2015)
