= Lina Wolff =

Swedish writer

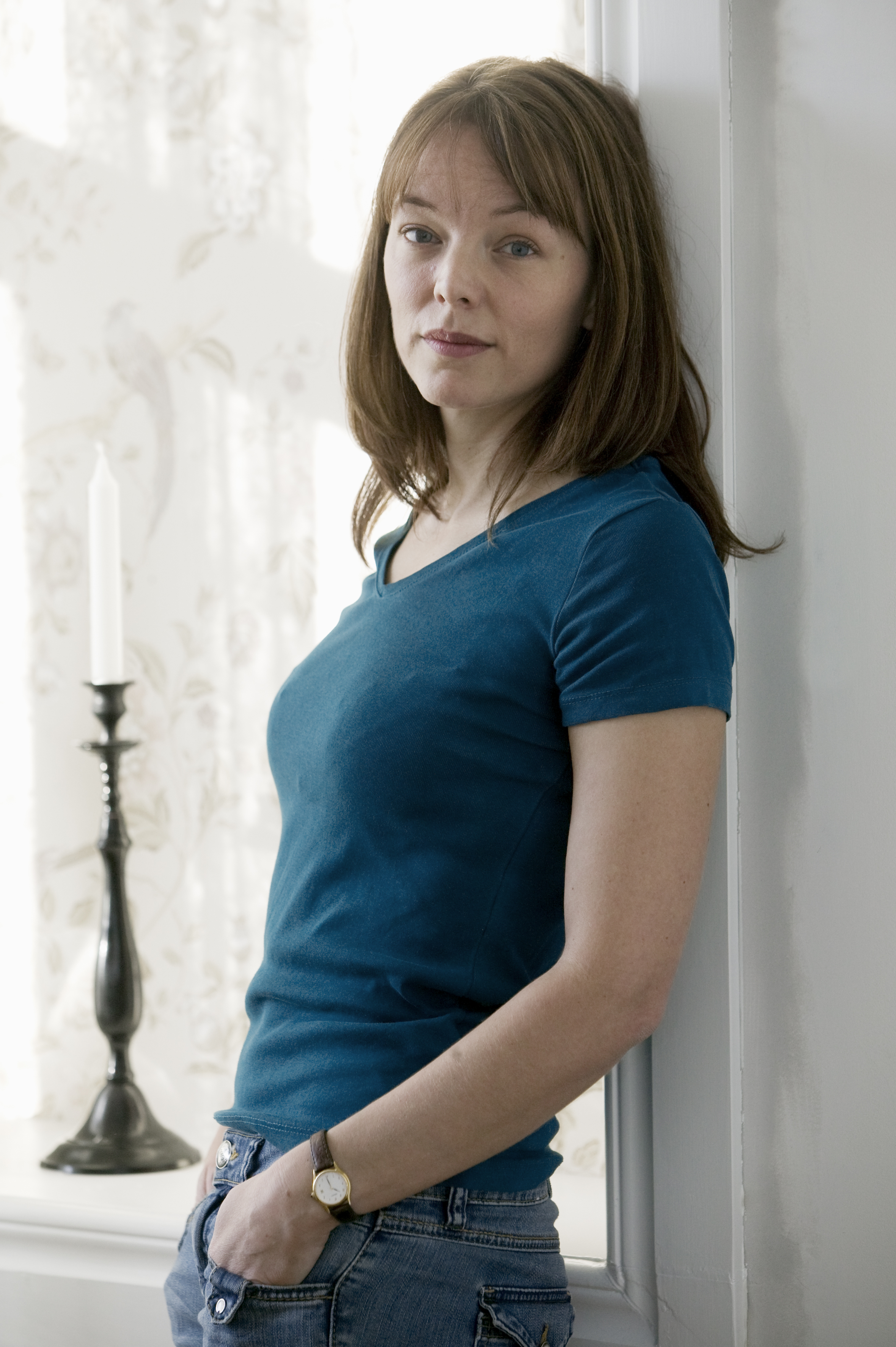
- Born: Lina Maria Erika Wolff; 22 October 1973 (age 53); Lund, Sweden
- Occupation: Author

Lina Wolff (born 22 October 1973) is a Swedish novelist, short story writer and translator.

Lina Wolff published her first book Många människor dör som du (Many people die like you), a short story collection, in 2009. It was written while she was living in Spain and is set in Spain and Skåne. Wolff is influenced by Spanish language literature and is considered to be a feminist writer.

Her debut novel, Bret Easton Ellis och de andra hundarna was awarded with Sweden's Vi Magazine Literature Prize, and was shortlisted for the 2013 Swedish Radio Award for Best Novel of the Year. The English translation Bret Easton Ellis and the Other Dogs (translated by Frank Perry), published by And Other Stories in 2016, was awarded the Oxford-Weidenfeld Translation Prize, Her second novel, The Polyglot Lovers, won Sweden's biggest domestic literary prize, the August Prize, as well as the Svenska Dagbladet Literature Prize, and has been translated into eighteen languages. In 2017, prior to its publication, The Polyglot Lovers (in English translation by Saskia Vogel) won a PEN Translates Award. Her third novel Köttets tid (English translation Carnality) was published in 2019. For her 2025 novel Liken vi begravde, Wolff was awarded the August Prize for the second time.

Wolff is also a translator of Spanish language literature and has translated works by Chilean author Roberto Bolaño, Argentinian writers Samanta Schweblin and César Aira, and a new translation of Gabriel García Márquez' novel One Hundred Years of Solitude to Swedish.

== Background ==
Lina Wolff grew up in Stångby and Hörby in the south of Sweden.

Wolff has a bachelor's degree in French and Italian, a master's degree in Literature and a master's degree in International Trade from CESMA Business school in Madrid. She has previously been a resident of Spain and Italy where she has worked as an interpreter, translator and commercial agent.

Wolff started writing in 2003 while living in Spain with her then Spanish husband and their son. She currently lives in Skåne in the south of Sweden.

== Works ==
- Många människor dör som du, 2009
  - Many People Die Like You (trans. Saskia Vogel), And Other Stories, UK (2020)
- Bret Easton Ellis och de andra hundarna, 2010
  - Bret Easton Ellis and the Other Dogs (trans. Frank Perry), And Other Stories, UK (2016) ISBN 9781908276643
- De polyglotta älskarna, 2016
  - The Polygot Lovers (trans. Saskia Vogel), And Other Stories, UK (2019) ISBN 9781911508441
- Köttets tid, 2019
  - Carnality (trans. Frank Perry), Other Press (2022) ISBN 978-1-63542-074-6
- Djävulsgreppet, 2022
  - The Devil's Grip (trans. Sakna Vogel), Other Press (2024) ISBN 978-1-63542-420-1,
- Promenader i natten (2024)
- Liken vi begravde (2025)
