= Susan Wicks =

British poet and novelist

Susan Wicks (born 1947 Kent, England) is a British poet and novelist.

She studied at the University of Hull, University of Sussex. She taught at University College, Dublin, University of Dijon, and the University of Kent. She teaches at Goldsmiths, University of London. She lives in Tunbridge Wells.

== Awards ==
Singing Underwater won the 1992 Aldeburgh Poetry Festival Prize. The Clever Daughter was shortlisted for both the 1996 T. S. Eliot Prize, and 1996 Forward Poetry Prize. Her translation of Valérie Rouzeau's Pas Revoir (Cold Spring in Winter) won the 2010 Scott Moncrieff Prize, and it was shortlisted for the 2010 Griffin Poetry Prize and the 2010 Oxford-Weidenfeld Translation Prize. She won the 2014 Oxford-Weidenfeld Translation Prize for her translation of Valérie Rouzeau's Talking Vrouz.

== Works ==
=== Poetry ===
- Singing Underwater, Faber and Faber, 1992 ISBN 978-0-571-16724-1
- Open diagnosis , Faber and Faber, 1994, ISBN 978-0-571-17139-2
- The Clever Daughter, Faber and Faber, 1996, ISBN 978-0-571-17926-8
- Night Toad: New & Selected Poems, Bloodaxe Books, 2003, ISBN 978-1-85224-636-5
- De-iced, Bloodaxe Books, 2007, ISBN 978-1-85224-755-3
- House of Tongues, Bloodaxe Books, 2011, ISBN 978-1-85224-906-9
- The Months, Bloodaxe Books, 2016, ISBN 978-1-78037-290-7

=== Poetry translations ===
- Valérie Rouzeau, Cold Spring in Winter, Arc, 2009, ISBN 978-1-904614-30-2
- Valérie Rouzeau, Talking Vrouz, Arc, 2013, ISBN 978-1-908376-16-9
- Writing the Real: A Bilingual Anthology of Contemporary French Poetry (translated Michèle Métail), 2015. Enitharmon Press

=== Memoir ===
- Driving My Father, Faber and Faber, 1995, ISBN 978-0-465-01699-0

=== Novels ===
- The Key, Faber and Faber, 1997, ISBN 978-0-571-17919-0
- Little Thing. Faber and Faber, 1998, ISBN 978-0-571-19344-8

=== Short stories ===
- Roll Up for the Arabian Derby, bluechrome, 2008, ISBN 978-1-906061-39-5
