= Zeyar Lynn =

Burmese poet

- ဇေယျာလင်း
- Born: Myint Aung; 1958 (age 66–67); Rangoon, Burma
- Occupations: Poet; writer; translator
- Website: zlkontempo.com

Zeyar Lynn (Burmese: ဇေယျာလင်း; born 1958; also known as Myint Aung) is a Burmese poet and writer. He is one of the most influential living poets in Myanmar, leading the post-modern and language poetry movement in Myanmar. He is based in Yangon. He began writing poems in the ninth grade, and Zeyar Lynn debuted in 1982 with Smoke of Depression. In 2006, he published his second poetry collection, Distinguishing Features.

== Works ==
- Smoke of Depression (1982)
- Distinguishing Features (2006)
- Real/Life: Prose Poems (2009)
- Kilimanjaro (2010)
- Poetry means Craft (2011)
