= Balsam Karam =

Swedish writer and librarian (born 1983)

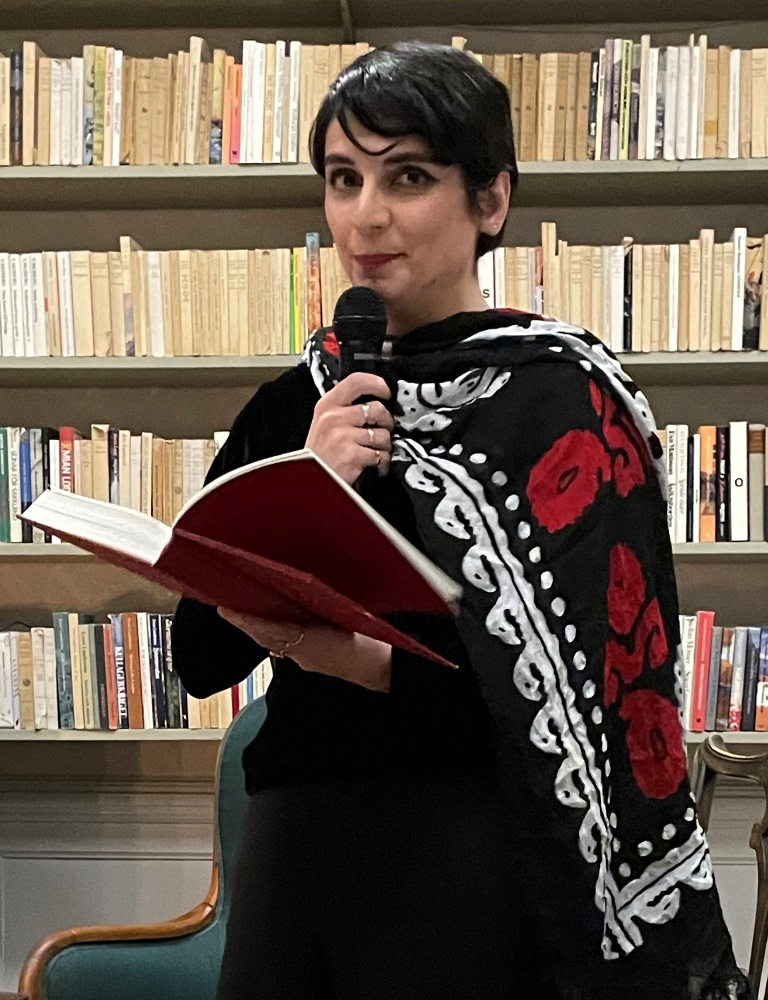
Image of Balsam Karam

Balsam Karam (born 1983) is a Swedish writer and librarian of Iranian Kurdish descent.

== Early life and education ==
Born in Tehran, in Iran, in 1983, her family moved to Sweden when she was seven. She studied at Biskops Arnös författarskola before doing a master's degree at the University of Gothenburg.

== Career ==
She works at Rinkeby Library in Stockholm and is a member of the Swedish Writers’ Union's library council.

In 2018, she released her first book, Händelsehorisonten (Event Horizon). For the book, she received the Smålits migrantpris in 2021.

In 2021, she released her second book, Singulariteten (The Singularity). The book was shortlisted for the 2021 European Union Prize for Literature.

Her next novel Mörk materia – en kärleksroman (Dark Matter – A Love Story) is expected to be released in September 2025.
