= Lispector =

Lispector (Yiddish: ליספּעקטאָר, Ukrainian: Ліспектор) is a surname. Notable people with the surname include:

- Clarice Lispector (1920–1977), Brazilian novelist and short story writer
- Elisa Lispector (1911–1989), Brazilian novelist
