= Roni Horn =

American visual artist and writer (born 1955)

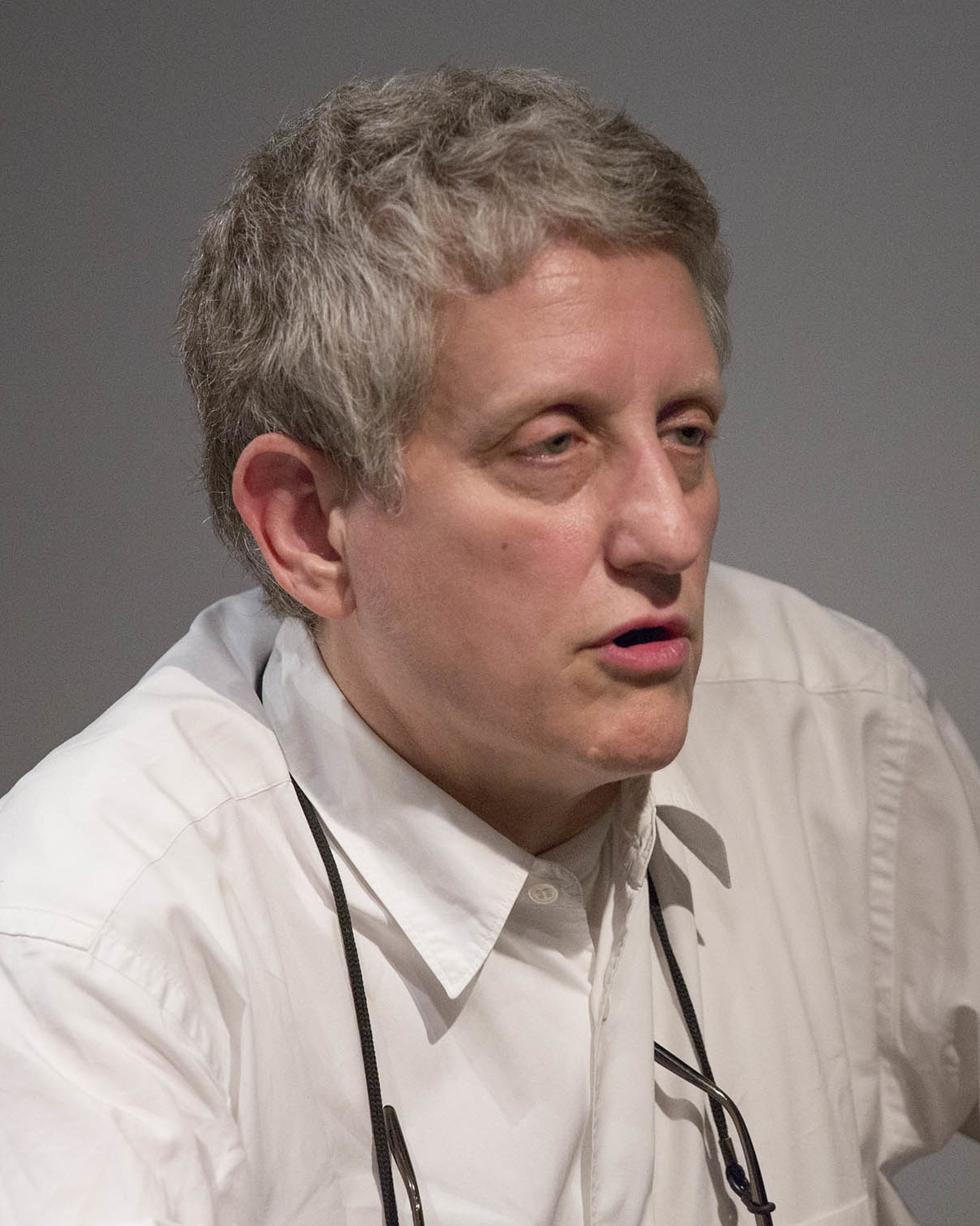
- Horn at Barcelona's Fundació Joan Miró, where she was given the Joan Miró Award
- Born: September 25, 1955 (age 71); New York City, U.S.
- Education: Rhode Island School of Design, Yale University
- Known for: Visual arts
- Awards: Joan Miró Award 2013 by Fundació Miró

Roni Horn (born September 25, 1955) is an American visual artist and writer. The granddaughter of Eastern European immigrants, she was born in New York City, where she lives and works. She is currently represented by Xavier Hufkens in Brussels and Hauser & Wirth in New York. She is openly gay.

== Early life and education ==
Horn was born on September 25, 1955, in New York City. She was named for her grandmothers, both of whom were named Rose. In a 2009 interview, Horn reflected on her gender neutral name as an advantage, stating "when I was young I decided that my sex, my gender, was nobody's business."

She grew up in Rockland County, New York.

Horn graduated from high school early and enrolled in the Rhode Island School of Design at age 16. She graduated with BFA in 1975 at age 19. Describing her "fast jaunt" in Providence, she stated "I had a studio in a bad neighborhood with very little daylight. It was dangerous and depressing."

Horn received an MFA in sculpture from Yale University in 1978. Since 1975 she has travelled often to Iceland, whose landscape and isolation have strongly influenced her practice; she obtained Icelandic citizenship via parliamentary decree in 2023.

== Work and recognition ==
Horn has been intimately involved with the singular geography, geology, climate and culture of Iceland. She first traveled to Iceland in the 1970s. Since her first encounter with the island as a young arts graduate visiting on a fellowship from Yale, Horn has returned to Iceland frequently.

=== To Place ===
The ongoing series of books entitled To Place (1990-) concern Iceland.

Reproducing 13 watercolour and graphite drawings, Bluff Life (1990) was produced in 1982 during a two-month stay in a lighthouse off the southern coast of Iceland in a town called Dyrhólaey. The series totals thirteen drawings, all made on note cards. The second book, Folds (1991), is a collection of photographs documenting extant sheepfolds. To Place: Verne's Journey (1995) is the fifth in the series. A photographic essay, the seventh volume Arctic Circles (1998) records the endless horizon of the North Sea, the feathers of an eider nest, and the rotating beacon of a lighthouse. Doubt Box (Book IX) (2006) is a collection of cards rather than a bound volume. Printed on both sides, the cards show pictures of glacial water, taxidermied birds, and a face.

In 2004-2006, the books were selected as some of the most important photobooks in history. A 2009 journal article stated that the nine To Place books "together constitute one of the most important groups of artists' books since Ed Ruscha's 1960s books and Bernd and Hilla Becher's publications on industrial architecture." Other publications include Dictionary of Water, This is Me, This is You, Cabinet of, If on a Winter's Night, Her, Her, Her, & Her, Wonderwater (Alice Offshore), and Index Cixous, 2003 – 05.

=== Installations ===
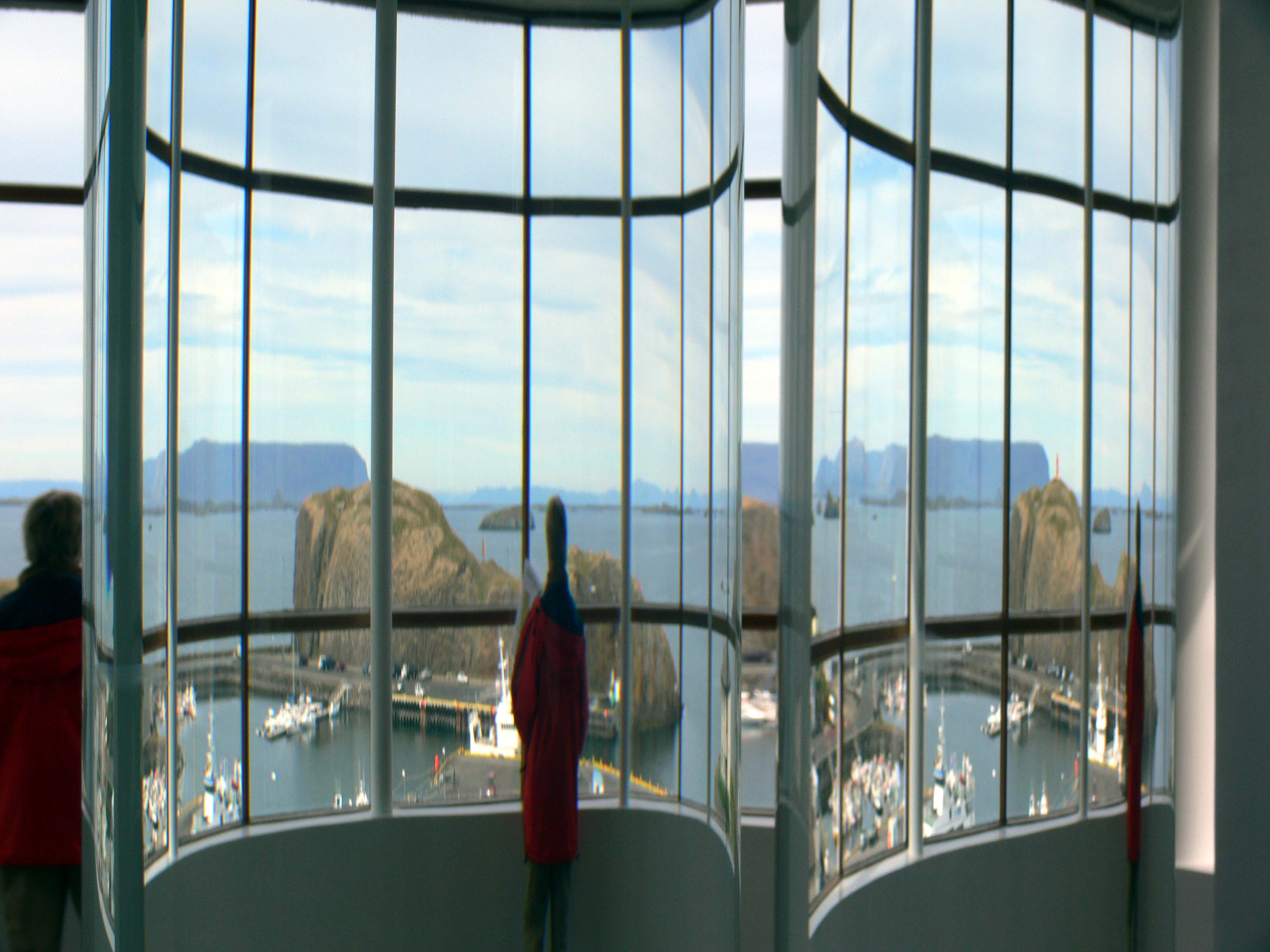
Vatnasafn, Horn's Library of Water in Stykkishólmur

Weather has played an important role in Horn's work. She has created several public artworks, including You Are the Weather—Munich (1996–97), a permanent installation for the Deutscher Wetterdienst bureau in Munich. You in You (1997), a rubber-tiled walkway in Basel's east train station, mimics an unusual basalt formation of Iceland. Some Thames (2000), a permanent installation at the University of Akureyri in Iceland, consists of 80 photographs of water dispersed throughout the university's public spaces. In 2007 she undertook Artangel’s first international commission, creating Vatnasafn / Library of Water, a long-term installation in the town of Stykkishólmur, Iceland. The installation is made up of water collected from Icelandic glaciers.

The "Library of Water" is housed in a former library building in Stykkisholmur on the west coast of Iceland. Horn noticed the building in the 1990s. It is located at the high point of the town, overlooking the harbour and the sea. It was conceived by Horn in 2004 as a sculpture installation and a community center.

In 2004, Hauser & Wirth in London was the location of an installation by Horn entitled Agua Viva for the exhibition Rings of Lispector. The installation consisted of interconnecting rubber tiles into which fragments of text from Hélène Cixous' English translation of Clarice Lispector's Agua Viva (The Stream of Life) were embedded into the floor in contrasting shades of tan-colored rubber. Horn manipulated passages of the text to shape partial and overlapping rings and loops, playing with the order and coherence of Lispector's text. The rubber floor's dimensions at Hauser & Wirth London were approximately 1,500 square feet, with each rubber tile 69 inches square. It contained 25 "rubber floor drawings" with additional plain tiles so that the piece would fit wall to wall.

Hélène Cixous wrote the accompanying monograph for the installation.

=== Photo series ===
Horn's first photographic installation, You Are The Weather (1994-1996), is a photographic cycle featuring 100 close-up shots of the same woman, Margret, in a variety of Icelandic geothermal pools. Notes written by Horn about this work were included in the catalogue that accompanied Horn's 2009 traveling retrospective Roni Horn aka Roni Horn. The two-volume book includes a Subject Index that brought together writings and reflections on works, themes, titles and topics related to Horn's practice. Curator Donna De Salvo says, "You are the Weather depicts a living, rather than an inert, thing. Horn complicated the notion of surface and skin. This treatment of the face smudges the distinction between object and subject. Just who is the 'you'? Of course all answers are completely dependent upon who chooses to inhabit the role of 'you.' It's a discovery process, which in some ways reflects the making of the work itself. The subtle and not so subtle difference in these photographs make it difficult for a viewer to dismiss any one image as being identical to the one next to it. 'You' have to look hard."

Many of the images in You Are the Weather were published in one of the To Place volumes. You are the Weather, Part 2, follows the same form as You are the Weather and features the same model, 15 years later.

The 45 color images of Horn's installation Pi (1998) were installed on all four walls of the Matthew Marks Gallery in New York. The pictures were taken over a six-year period in Iceland.

Still Water (The River Thames, for Example) (1999) is a single work composed of fifteen photographic offset lithographs, each 30 1/2 x 41 1/2 inches. It is in the collection of the Museum of Modern Art. It was commissioned around 1998, and Horn has noted that it came about at the same time as the end of a long love relationship. Each of the 15 lithographs features a photograph of the surface of the River Thames that has been annotated with many small white numerals that correspond to a bar of footnotes that runs along the lower border of each image.

=== Sculpture ===
Gold Mats, Paired - For Ross and Felix (1994/1995) at the National Gallery of Art in 2022

Félix González-Torres had the opportunity to view Horn's sculpture Forms from the Gold Field in 1990 at the Museum of Contemporary Art, Los Angeles. In 1993, he made Untitled (Placebo-Landscape-for Roni). In response, Horn made a second gold field piece, Gold Mats, Paired-For Ross and Felix (1994-1995), dedicated to the late González-Torres and his partner Ross Laycock.

Horn's 1993 series When Dickinson shut her eyes comprises eight square aluminium poles of different lengths leaning against the gallery wall, each bearing a line from Emily Dickinson's poem A Wind that rose.

Pink Tons (2008) is a solid cast glass cube 1219 x 1219 x 1219 mm, weighing 4536 kg manufactured by Schott, a German glass manufacturing company with whom she has worked since her student times. They also manufactured the columns of her Library of Water in Iceland.

Horn's 2009-2010 work Well and Truly consists of ten solid cast glass parts, each measuring 91.5 cm in diameter and 45.5 cm in height. Well and Truly is part of a private collection, but was included in an exhibition of the same title at Kunsthaus Bregenz from April 24 to July 4, 2010. The ten glass elements are cylinders in shades of blue and pale blue greens.

=== Documentary ===
Horn was one of the artists featured on PBS' Art:21 series of biographies of contemporary artists.

== Exhibitions ==
Horn's first solo exhibition (outside the university) was held in 1980 at the Kunstraum München. With two New York shows at the Paula Cooper and Leo Castelli galleries, Horn's career accelerated in the late 1980s. Horn received the CalArts/Alpert Award in the Arts in 1998, NEA fellowships in 1984, 1986 and 1990, and a Guggenheim fellowship, also in 1990. She has had one-person exhibitions at the Nasher Sculpture Center (2017); the Art Institute of Chicago (2004); Centre Georges Pompidou, Paris (2003); Dia Center for the Arts, New York, and Museu Serralves, Porto (2001); Whitney Museum of American Art, New York; Kunsthalle Basel (1995); Rencontres d'Arles festival, France (2009) and Tate Modern, London (2009). Group exhibitions include the Whitney Biennial (1991, 2004); Documenta (1992); and Venice Biennale (1997), among others. In 2004 she was a visiting critic at Columbia University.

In November 2009, the Whitney Museum of American Art opened a survey show of Horn's work. Titled "Roni Horn aka Roni Horn", the show travelled to the Institute of Contemporary Art in Boston (2010), the Tate Modern, London (25 February - 25 May 2009), and the Collection Lambert in Avignon (21 June - 4 October 2009).

In 2016 Horn had a solo exhibition in Tilburg, The Netherlands, at De Pont Museum of Contemporary Art.

In February 2019, The Menil Collection in Houston, Texas held a two part solo exhibition, "When I Breathe, I Draw". The first part, features Horn's large scale works on paper, and the second, was devoted to works created from cutting, housed in the Menil Drawing Institute's main gallery. She was also commissioned to install her "Wits' End Sampler" wall drawing in the entry space of the Menil Drawing Institute.

In 2024 Horn had a solo exhibition in Museum Ludwig, Cologne and her first major retrospective in the Nordic countries in Louisiana Museum of Art, Humlebæk, Denmark.

From September 12, 2025 – February 15, 2026, the Museum of Contemporary Art Denver exhibited "Roni Horn: Water, Water on the Wall, You're the Fairest of Them All." The exhibit displayed a range of Horn's works including photography and sculpture and focused on the concept of water.

== Notable works in public collections ==
- Gold Field (1980-1982, 1982/2013), Solomon R. Guggenheim Museum, New York; and Glenstone, Potomac, Maryland
- Things That Happen Again, Pair Object VII (For a Here and a There) (1986-1988), Chinati Foundation, Marfa, Texas (longterm loan from Judd Foundation)
- Asphere (1988-1990, 1998/2001), Museum of Fine Arts, Boston; and Glenstone, Potomac, Maryland
- Kafka's Palindrome (1991), Museum of Contemporary Art, Los Angeles
- Pair Field: Group IV (1991), Museum of Fine Arts, Houston
- Steven's Bouquet (1991), Museum of Modern Art, New York
- Lava Fields of Iceland (1992), National Gallery of Art, Washington, D.C.
- How Dickinson Stayed Home (1993), Museum of Contemporary Art, Los Angeles
- When Dickinson Shut Her Eyes No. 859: A Doubt If It Be Us (1993), Crystal Bridges Museum of American Art, Bentonville, Arkansas
- Key and Cue No. 1182 (Remembrance has a rear and front) (1994), University of Michigan Museum of Art, Ann Arbor
- Gold Mats, Paired - for Ross and Felix (1994/1995), Art Institute of Chicago
- Deeps and Skies (1995-1996), Art Institute of Chicago
- Untitled (Flannery) (1996-1997), The Guggenheim, New York
- Still Water (The River Thames, for Example) (1999), Museum of Modern Art, New York
- Key and Cue, No. 288 (1994-2004), Institute of Contemporary Art, Boston
- Untitled (Aretha) (2002-2004), Museum of Modern Art, New York
- Doubt by Water (2003-2004), Whitney Museum, New York
- White Dickinson I THINK OF YOUR FOREST AND SEA AS A FAR OFF SHERBET (2006), Glenstone, Potomac, Maryland
- Opposite of White, v.2 (Large) (A) (2006-2007), National Gallery of Art, Washington, D.C.
- Opposites of White, 2006-2007, Kröller-Müller Museum, Otterlo (KM 133.928).
- Pink Tons (2009, 2008-2011), Tate, London; and Glenstone, Potomac, Maryland
- Untitled ("The sensation of satisfaction at having outstared a baby.") (2013), Los Angeles County Museum of Art
- Water Double, v. 3 (2013-2015), Glenstone, Potomac, Maryland
