= Blindness (novel) =

1995 novel by José Saramago

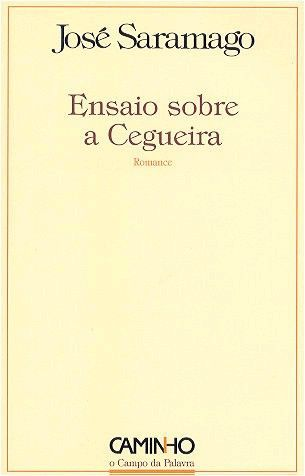
- 1st edition Cover (Portuguese)
- Author: José Saramago
- Original title: Ensaio sobre a cegueira
- Translator: Giovanni Pontiero
- Language: Portuguese
- Genre: Post-apocalyptic
- Publisher: Caminho
- Publication date: 1995
- Publication place: Portugal
- English publication date: October 1997
- Media type: Print (Hardcover, paperback)
- Pages: 288
- ISBN: 1-86046-297-9
- OCLC: 38225068
- Dewey Decimal: 869.3/42 21
- LC Class: PQ9281.A66 E6813 1997
- Followed by: Seeing

Blindness (Portuguese: Ensaio sobre a cegueira, lit. 'Essay on Blindness') is a 1995 novel by Portuguese author José Saramago. It centers on an unexplained mass epidemic of blindness afflicting nearly everyone in a nonspecific city, and follows multiple unnamed characters as they navigate the social breakdown that swiftly follows. The novel was translated into English by Giovanni Pontiero in 1997.

In 1998, Saramago received the Nobel Prize for Literature, and Blindness was one of his works noted by the committee when announcing the award.

A sequel titled Seeing was published in 2004. Blindness was adapted into a film of the same name in 2008.

== Plot summary ==
Blindness is the story of an unexplained mass epidemic of blindness afflicting nearly everyone in an unnamed city, and the social breakdown that swiftly follows. The novel follows the misfortune of a handful of unnamed characters who are among the first to be stricken with blindness, including an ophthalmologist, several of his patients, and assorted others, who are thrown together by chance. The doctor's wife is inexplicably immune to the blindness. After a lengthy and traumatic quarantine in an asylum, the group bands together in a family-like unit to survive by their wits and by the good fortune that the doctor's wife has escaped the blindness. The sudden onset and unexplained origin and nature of the blindness cause widespread panic, and the social order rapidly unravels as the government attempts to contain the apparent contagion and keep order via increasingly repressive and inept measures.

The first part of the novel follows the experiences of the central characters in the filthy, overcrowded asylum where they and other blind people have been quarantined. Hygiene, living conditions, and morale degrade horrifically in a very short period, mirroring the society outside.

Anxiety over the availability of food, caused by delivery irregularities, acts to undermine solidarity; and lack of organization prevents the internees from fairly distributing food or chores. Soldiers assigned to guard the asylum and look after the well-being of the internees become increasingly antipathetic as one soldier after another becomes infected. The military refuses to allow basic medicine to be delivered, which ensures that a simple infection becomes deadly. Fearing an imminent escape, soldiers shoot down a crowd of internees waiting for a food delivery.

Conditions degenerate further as an armed clique gains control over food deliveries, subjugating their fellow internees and exposing them to violent assault, rape, and deprivation. Faced with starvation, internees battle each other and burn down the asylum, only to discover that the army has abandoned the asylum, after which the protagonists join the throngs of nearly helpless blind people outside who wander the devastated city and fight one another to survive.

The story then follows the doctor's wife, her husband, and their impromptu “family” as they attempt to survive outside, cared for largely by the doctor’s wife, who can still see (though she must hide this fact at first). At this point, the breakdown of society is near total. Law and order, social services, government, schools, etc., no longer function. Families have been separated and cannot find one another. People squat in abandoned buildings and scrounge for food. Violence, disease, and despair threaten to overwhelm human coping. The doctor and his wife and their new “family” eventually make a permanent home in the doctor's house and are establishing a new order to their lives when the blindness lifts from the city en masse just as suddenly and inexplicably as it struck.

== Characters ==
=== The doctor's wife ===
The doctor's wife is the only character in the novel who does not lose her sight. This phenomenon remains unexplained through the novel. Unwilling to leave her husband to be interned, she lies to the government doctors and claims to be blind. As such, she is interned with the rest of the afflicted. Once inside, she attempts to help the compound organize, but she is increasingly unable to hold back the animality of the compound. When one ward begins withholding food and demanding that the women of other wards submit to being raped in return for food, she kills the leader of their ward. Once they escape the compound, she helps her group survive in the city. The doctor's wife is the de facto leader of their small group, although in the end, she often serves their disabled needs and acts as a nurse to them.

=== The doctor ===
The doctor is an ophthalmologist stricken blind after treating a patient with what will come to be called "the white sickness". The doctor is among the first to be quarantined along with his wife. Due to his medical expertise he has a certain authority among those quarantined. However, much of the doctor's authority stems from his wife not having gone blind; she is able to see what is going on around the ward and relays what she sees to her husband. When the group from his ward finally escapes they end up travelling to and staying in the doctor and his wife's apartment. Several of the other main characters had been visiting the doctor's office when the epidemic begins to spread.

=== The girl with the dark glasses ===
The girl with the dark glasses is a former part-time prostitute who is struck blind while she is with a customer. She seemingly contracted the “white-blindness” while visiting the doctor due to conjunctivitis (hence the dark glasses). She is unceremoniously removed from the hotel and taken to be quarantined in the asylum. Once inside, she joins the small group of people who were contaminated at the doctor's office. When the car thief gropes her on the way to the lavatory, she kicks him with a heeled shoe – giving him a wound which will eventually lead to his death. While inside, she also takes care of the boy with the squint, whose mother is nowhere to be found. At the end of the story, she and the old man with the black eye patch become lovers.

=== The old man with the black eye patch ===
The old man with the black eye patch is the last person to join the first ward. He brings with him a portable transistor radio that allows the internees to listen to the news. He is also the main architect of the failed attack on the ward of hoodlums hoarding the food rations. Once the group escapes the quarantine, the old man becomes the lover of the girl with the dark glasses.

=== The dog of tears ===
The dog of tears is a dog that joins the small group of blind people when they leave the quarantine. While he is mostly loyal to the doctor's wife, he helps the whole group by protecting them all from packs of dogs who are becoming increasingly feral. He is called the dog of tears because he bonded to the group when he licked the tears off the face of the doctor's wife.

=== The boy with the squint ===
The boy with the squint was a patient of the doctor's, which is most likely how he became infected. He is brought to the quarantine without his mother and soon falls in with the group in the first ward. The girl with the dark glasses assumes a motherly role for him, as she takes care of him and ensures his safety.

=== The car thief ===
After the first blind man was struck blind in traffic, a car thief brought him home then stole his car. Soon after he went blind, the car thief and the first blind man re-encounter one another in the quarantine, where they soon come to blows. They have no time to resolve their conflict, though, since the car thief is the first internee killed by the guards. He is gunned down while trying to ask the guards for medication for his infected leg.

=== The first blind man ===
The first man to go blind is struck blind in the middle of traffic, waiting at a stoplight. He is immediately taken home and then to the doctor's office, where he infects all of the other patients and the doctor. He is one of the principal members of the first ward - the ward with all of the original internees. When the epidemic is finally over, he is the first person to regain his sight.

=== The first blind man's wife ===
The wife of the first blind man goes blind soon after helping her husband to the quarantine. They are reunited by chance in the quarantine. Once inside, she also joins the first ward with the doctor and the doctor's wife. When the ward of hoodlums begins to demand that the women sleep with them in order to be fed, the first blind man's wife volunteers to go, in solidarity with the others.

=== The man with the gun ===
The man with the gun is the leader of the ward of hoodlums that seizes control of the food supply in the quarantine. He and his ward take the rations by force and threaten to shoot anyone who doesn't comply with their orders. This ward extorts valuables from the other internees in exchange for food and, when the "goods" (such as bracelets and watches) run out they begin to rape the women. He is later stabbed to death by the doctor's wife.

=== The blind accountant ===
This man is not one of those afflicted by the "white sickness"—rather he has been blind since birth. He is the only one in the ward who can read and write braille and who knows how to use a walking stick. Additionally, he is the second in command to the man with the gun in the ward of hoodlums. When the doctor's wife kills the man with the gun, the blind accountant takes the gun and tries to seize control but he is unable to rally support. He dies when one of the rape victims sets fire to the ward.

== Style ==
Like most works by Saramago, Blindness contains many long passages in which commas take the place of periods, quotation marks, semicolons, and colons. The lack of quotation marks around dialogue means that the speakers' identities (or the fact that dialogue is occurring) may not be immediately apparent to the reader. The lack of proper character names in Blindness is typical of many of Saramago's novels (e.g. All the Names). The characters are instead referred to by descriptive appellations such as "the doctor's wife", "the car thief", or "the first blind man". Given the characters' blindness, some of their names seem ironic ("the boy with the squint" or "the girl with the dark glasses").

The city afflicted by the blindness is never named, nor the country specified. Few definite identifiers of culture are given, which contributes an element of timelessness and universality to the novel. However, there are some signs that hint that the country is Saramago's homeland of Portugal: the main character is shown eating chouriço, a spicy sausage, and some dialogue in the original Portuguese employs the familiar "tu" second-person singular verb form (a distinction absent in most of Brazil). The church, with all its saintly images, is likely of the Catholic variety.

== Sequel ==
Saramago wrote a sequel to Blindness in 2004, titled Seeing (Ensaio sobre a lucidez, literal English translation Essay on lucidity), which has also been translated into English. The sequel novel takes place in the same country featured in Blindness and features several of the same nameless characters. The book "Seeing" is a much more realistic novel with positive possibilities suggested/asserted.

== Adaptations ==
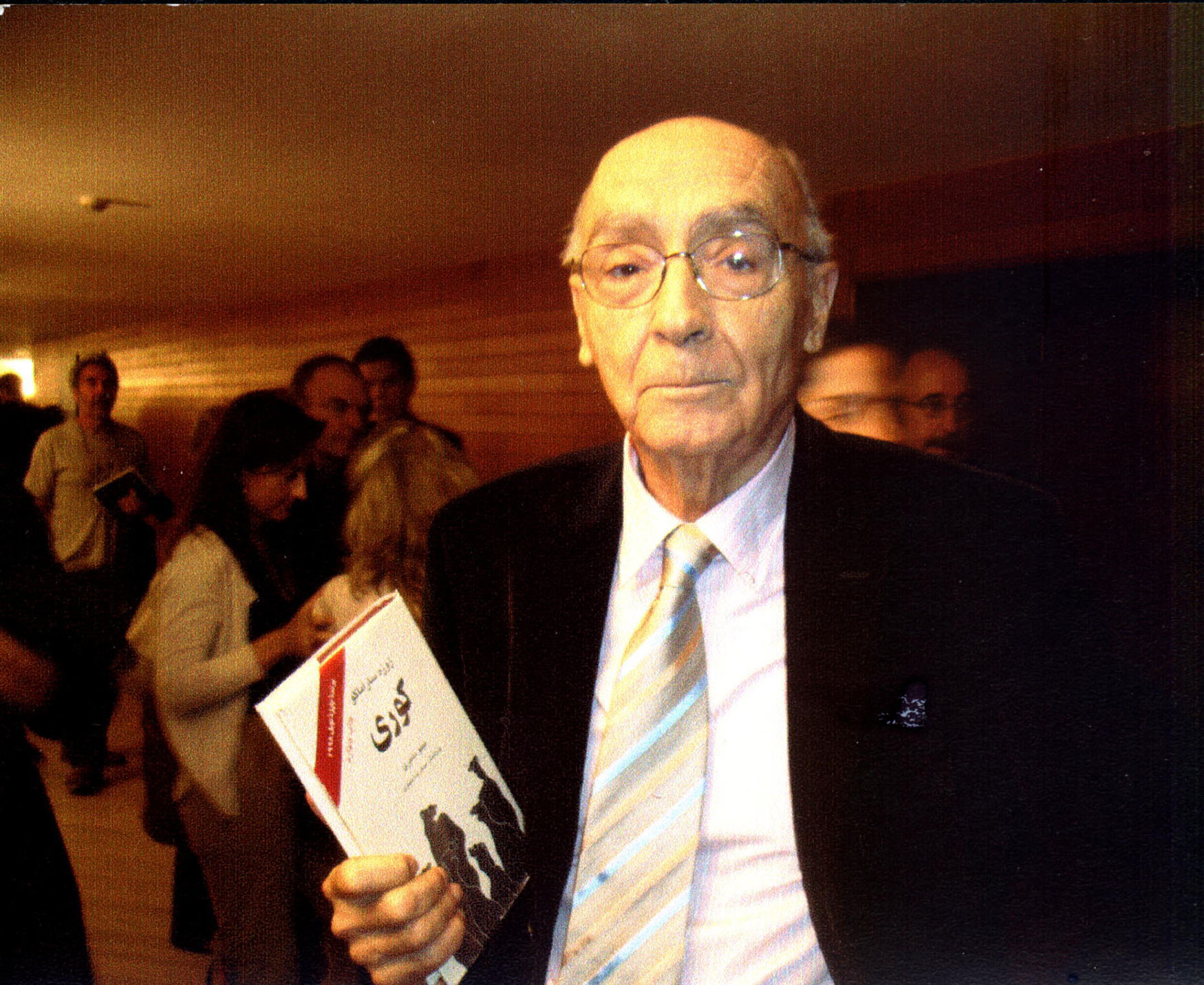
Author José Saramago holding the Persian edition of Blindness

An English-language film adaptation of Blindness was directed by Fernando Meirelles, and stars Mark Ruffalo as the doctor and Julianne Moore as the doctor's wife. The film opened the 2008 Cannes Film Festival.

In 2007, the novel was adapted for theatre. It was staged by the Godlight Theatre Company at 59E59 Theaters in New York. The First Blind Man was played by Mike Roche.

An outdoor performance adaptation by the Polish group Teatr KTO was first presented in June 2010. It has since been performed at a number of venues, including the Old College Quad of the University of Edinburgh during the 2012 Edinburgh Festival Fringe.

Shortly before his death, Saramago gave German composer Anno Schreier the rights to compose an opera based on the novel. The libretto is written in German by Kerstin Maria Pöhler. Like the German translation of the novel, the opera's title is "Die Stadt der Blinden". It saw its first performance on November 12, 2011 at the Zurich Opera House.

In August 2020, the Donmar Warehouse produced a socially-distanced sound installation based on the novel. BLINDNESS was adapted by Simon Stephens and directed by Walter Meierjohann. Juliet Stevenson voiced the Doctor's Wife.

== See also ==
- The Day of the Triffids, a 1951 John Wyndham novel (and its many adaptations) about societal collapse following widespread blindness
- "Many, Many Monkeys"
- "The Country of the Blind" by H. G. Wells
