= The Passion According to G.H. =

Book by Clarice Lispector

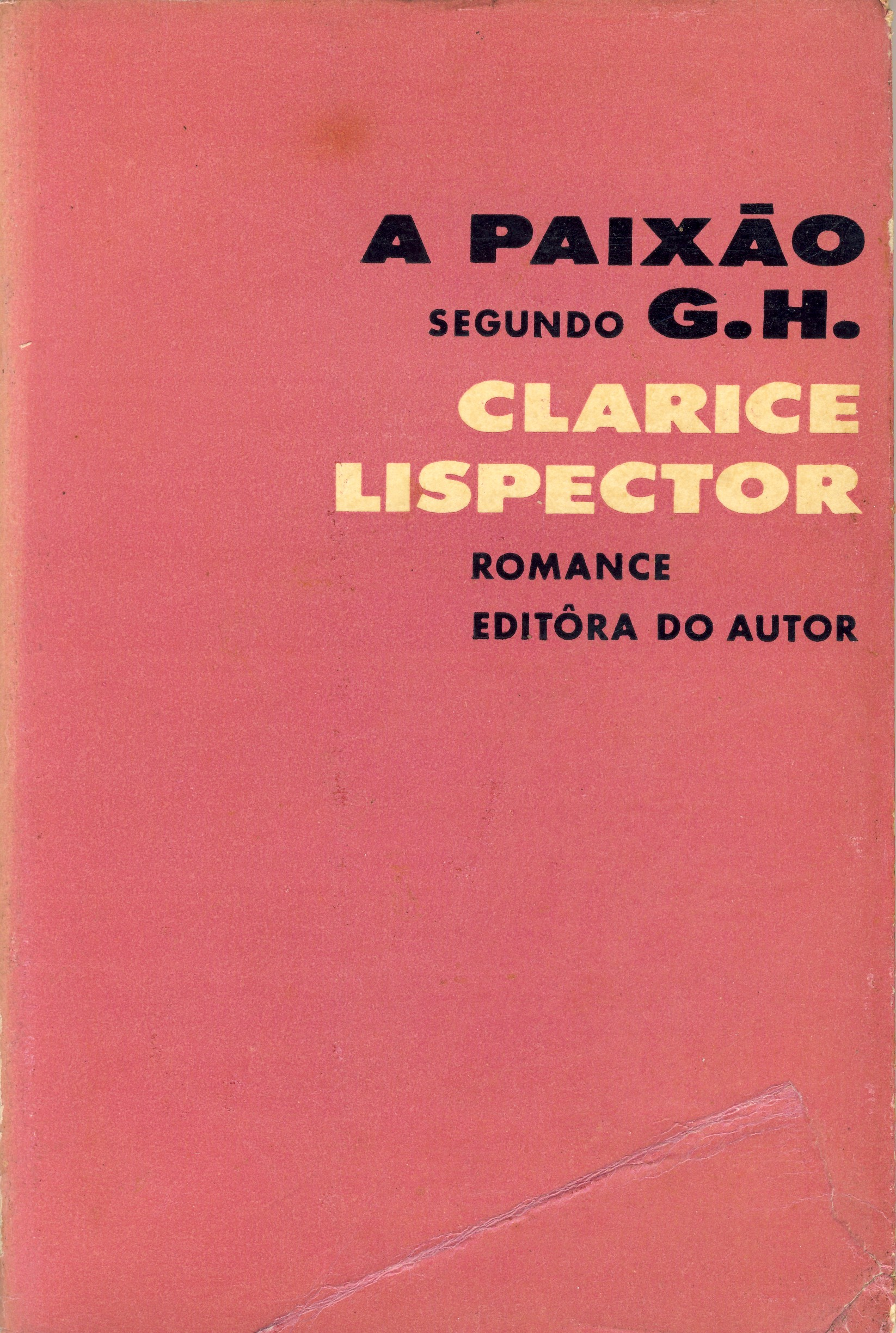
- Cover for the first Brazilian edition of the novel, Editora do Autor, 1964
- Author: Clarice Lispector
- Original title: A Paixão segundo G.H.
- Language: Portuguese
- Genre: Novel
- Publisher: Editora do Autor
- Publication date: 1964
- Publication place: Brazil
- English publication date: 1988 / 2012
- Media type: Print
- Preceded by: A Legião estrangeira (The Foreign Legion)
- Followed by: Uma aprendizagem ou o livro dos prazeres (An Apprenticeship or The Book of Pleasures)

The Passion According to G.H. (A paixão segundo G.H., Brazilian Portuguese: [a pajˈʃɐ̃w̃ seˈɡũdu ˌʒe.aˈɡa]) is a mystical novel by Brazilian writer Clarice Lispector, published in 1964. The work takes the form of a monologue by a woman, identified only as G.H., telling of the crisis that ensued the previous day after she crushed a cockroach in the door of a wardrobe. Its canonical status was recognized in 1988 by its inclusion in the Arquivos Collection, the UNESCO series of critical editions of the greatest works of Latin American literature. It has been translated into English twice, the first time in 1988 by Ronald W. Sousa, and then by Idra Novey in 2012.

== Background and publication ==
The novel was written in a quick burst at the end of 1963, following a period of difficulty in Lispector's life. "It's strange," she remembered, "because I was in the worst of situations, sentimentally as well as in my family, everything complicated, and I wrote The Passion, which has nothing to do with that." The novel was published in the following year by Editora do Author, which was run by Lispector's friends Rubem Braga and Fernando Sabino.

== Plot summary ==
When the book opens, G.H., a well-to-do resident of a Rio de Janeiro penthouse, reminisces on what happened to her the previous day, when she decided to clean out the room occupied by the black maid, who had just quit. She forgets the maid's name, and struggles to recall her face.

"Before I entered the room, what was I?" G.H. asks. "I was what others had always seen me be, and that was the way I knew myself."

Though G.H. expects the maid's room to be a mess, she is instead surprised to find "an entirely clean and vibrating room as in an insane asylum from which dangerous objects have been removed".

The room was the opposite of what I had created in my house, the opposite of the soft beauty that came from my talent for arrangement, my talent for living, the opposite of my serene irony, of my sweet and exempt irony: it was a violation of my quotation marks, of the quotation marks that made me a citation of myself. The room was the portrait of an empty stomach.

On the white wall of the maid's room are black scratches outlining the forms of a man, a woman, and a dog. G.H. regards the drawing and realizes that the maid had hated her. Furious, she opens the wardrobe and is frightened by a cockroach crawling from inside it. She slams the door shut onto the cockroach, and sees the insect's innards ooze out of its still-living body.

G.H. is appalled by the sight, but she is trapped in the room by the irresistible fascination for the dying insect. She wants to scream, but she knows it is already too late: "If I raised the alarm at being alive, voiceless and hard they would drag me away since they drag away those who depart the possible world, the exceptional being is dragged away, the screaming being [sic]."

Staring at the insect, her human personality begins to break down; finally, at the height of her mystic crisis, she famously takes the matter oozing from the cockroach—the fundamental, anonymous matter of the universe which she shares with the roach—and puts it in her mouth.

== Literary significance and criticism ==
Shortly before her death, Lispector told a reporter that of all her books G.H. was the one that "best corresponded to her demands as a writer." Many critics have agreed, and few Brazilian authors have failed to comment on it, as the extensive bibliography in the UNESCO edition, edited by philosopher Benedito Nunes, indicates.

Ronald W. Sousa, translator of the novel from Portuguese to English, re-examines the way most criticism addresses the key issue of the language dynamics of the novel. Rather than seeing the dynamics in a Romantic or avant-garde position, Sousa poses that Lispector does not seek to remake language but rather seeks to work within it. Throughout the novel, "G.H. explores before our eyes some of the key oppositions upon which language is built."

Suzanne Ruta has written in The New York Times that the text is "shaped in the form of a manual for meditation, a set of spiritual exercises leading at last to a more authentic relation with the world, the self and others."
