= Giovanni Pontiero =

Giovanni Pontiero (10 February 1932 – 10 February 1996) was a Scots-Italian scholar and translator of Portuguese fiction. Most notably, he translated the works of José Saramago and Clarice Lispector, two celebrated names in Portuguese-language literature.

== Life ==
Born and raised in Glasgow, after secondary school Pontiero went into seminary at Biggar and later at Rimini, Italy, but at age 24 decided to abdicate from a religious career. He graduated from the University of Glasgow in 1960 and completed his PhD while in Brazil at Universidade Federal de Paraíba, returning to Manchester to defend his thesis on Manuel Bandeira. In 1962 he was appointed lecturer in Latin American studies at Manchester. He was later promoted to senior lecturer and finally Reader in Latin-American Literature in the Victoria University of Manchester until his retirement in 1995. Pontiero had a lifelong interest in the theatre, in particular the work of the great Italian actress Eleonora Duse (1858–1924). He translated, edited and wrote the introduction of Duse on Tour: The Diaries of Guido Noccioli 1906–1907 (Manchester University Press, 1981), and later went on to write a biography of Duse, Eleonora Duse: In Life and Art (Verlag Peter Lang, 1986). Pontiero died on 10 February 1996 following a debilitating illness. Despite his declining health, he continued translating until his death, completing works that were published posthumously. Following his death, his collection of over 1,000 items relating to Duse was bequeathed to the Glasgow University Library in 1996.

== Work ==
Holding an academic position and translating, he not only gave students advice, but wrote about the translating profession. He was the principal translator into English of the works of both Saramago and Clarice Lispector, and met early acclaim for his translation of Lispector's short story "Amor", winning the Camões Prize for Translation in 1968. In 1993 he won The Independent's Foreign Fiction Award for the translation of Saramago's The Year of the Death of Ricardo Reis and the Outstanding Translation Award from the American Literary Translator's Association for the same author's The Gospel According to Jesus Christ the following year; later receiving the Texeira-Gomes Prize for this same translation. He was amongst those to note Pandeism to be an influence on the writings of noted mid-twentieth-century Brazilian poet Carlos Nejar.

Pontiero's papers are held by the John Rylands Library, University of Manchester.

== Notable translations into English (publication dates for original followed by translation) ==
=== José Saramago ===
- Baltasar and Blimunda, 1982, 1987
- The Year of the Death of Ricardo Reis, 1984, 1991
- The Gospel According to Jesus Christ, 1991, 1994
- The Stone Raft, 1986, 1994
- Manual of Painting and Calligraphy, 1977, 1995
- The History of the Siege of Lisbon, 1989, 1996
- Blindness, 1995, 1997
- The Lives of Things, 1978, 2012

=== Clarice Lispector ===
- Family Ties, 1960, 1984
- The Foreign Legion, 1964, 1986
- Near to the Wild Heart, 1943, 1990 (2012)
- The Hour of the Star, 1977, 1992
- Selected Cronicas, 1967–1973, 1996
- Discovering the World, 1997
