= Alison Entrekin =

Australian translator

- Occupation: Literary translator
- Years active: 2000s–present
- Known for: Translations of Brazilian and Portuguese literature
- Notable work: City of God, Budapest, My Sweet Orange Tree, Near to the Wild Heart, Vastlands: The Crossing
- Awards: New South Wales Premier’s Translation Prize (2019), PEN Medallion, AAWP Translators’ Prize (2022)

Alison Entrekin ORB is an Australian literary translator known for her translations of Brazilian and Portuguese literature into English. She has translated over forty books, including works by Chico Buarque, Paulo Lins, José Mauro de Vasconcelos, Cristóvão Tezza, and Clarice Lispector.

== Early life and education ==
Entrekin studied creative writing in Perth before pursuing literary translation in Brazil, where she lived for 24 years before returning to Australia.

== Career ==
Entrekin began her literary translation career in the early 2000s. Her first major work was the English translation of City of God by Paulo Lins, published in 2004. She also translated Budapest by Chico Buarque, which was shortlisted for the 2005 Independent Foreign Fiction Prize.

Her translation of My Sweet Orange Tree by José Mauro de Vasconcelos was published in 2008. In 2012, she translated The Eternal Son by Cristóvão Tezza, which was shortlisted for the 2012 IMPAC Dublin Literary Award. The same year, she published her translation of Clarice Lispector’s Near to the Wild Heart, shortlisted for the 2013 PEN America Translation Prize.

Her current major project is a new English translation of João Guimarães Rosa’s Grande Sertão: Veredas. She was sought by the agency representing the author's heirs in 2014 with an offer to do a new translation of the book; the first one (titled The Devil to Pay in the Backlands) was made in 1965 by Harriet de Onís. The first translation was criticized for not conveying the inventiveness of Rosa's language, who worked with the regionalisms and syntax of the people from the Sertão and created new words. Entrekin got a funding grant from Itaú Cultural foundation to undertake the project and took ten years working on the new translation.

An excerpt of this translation won the 2022 AAWP Translators' Prize, and the full translation is scheduled to be published by Simon & Schuster in 2027 under the title Vastlands: The Crossing.

Entrekin’s shorter works and translations have appeared in journals and magazines including Words Without Borders, Granta, Modern Poetry in Translation, Wasafiri and The White Review.

== Awards and recognition ==
Entrekin won the 2019 New South Wales Premier’s Translation Prize and PEN Medallion, after being shortlisted for the prize in 2009, 2011, and 2013. She received the 2022 AAWP Translators’ Prize for an excerpt of Great Sertão: Meanderings.

She has also been shortlisted for the 2005 Independent Foreign Fiction Prize, the 2012 IMPAC Dublin Literary Award, and the 2013 PEN America Translation Prize.

In addition, she was awarded an American Literary Translators Association (ALTA) Travel Fellowship in 2002 and placed third in the 2023 Stephen Spender Poetry Prize for a co-translation from Portuguese.

In April 2026, she was awarded the Order of Rio Branco from the Brazilian government.

== Translation style and approach ==
In conversations, Entrekin has talked about how hard it is to translate literary works, especially when it comes to modernist and experimental works. In an interview with Asymptote Journal, she talked about how her immersion in Brazilian society helped her to communicate complex language. In The Common, she wrote about how hard it was to translate Rosa's Grande Sertão: Veredas into English while still being true to the original and also making it easy for new readers to understand.

She has also written for the Los Angeles Review of Books about adapting Clarice Lispector. In that piece, she talks about how Lispector's work includes a lot of different points of view.

== Selected works ==
- City of God by Paulo Lins (2004)
- Budapest by Chico Buarque (2004)
- My Sweet Orange Tree by José Mauro de Vasconcelos (2008)
- The Eternal Son by Cristóvão Tezza (2012)
- Near to the Wild Heart by Clarice Lispector (2012)
- Great Sertão: Meanderings (excerpt, 2019)
- Vastlands: The Crossing (full translation of Grande Sertão: Veredas, forthcoming 2027)

== Reception ==
Entrekin’s translations have received positive reviews in English-language media. The Guardian praised her translation of Lispector’s Near to the Wild Heart for its “liquid clarity”. Reviewing Buarque’s Budapest, Kirkus Reviews described her translation as “lyrical, rhythmic, and supple”. Publishers Weekly highlighted her translation of City of God for its “raw, visceral energy”.
