= Johnny Lorenz =

Johnny Lorenz is a poet, translator and literary critic. He obtained his PhD from UT Austin and now teaches at Montclair State University.

The son of Brazilian immigrants, Lorenz is known for his translations of contemporary Brazilian literature. These include:

- A Breath of Life by Clarice Lispector (New Directions) - finalist for the Best Translated Book Award
- The Besieged City by Clarice Lispector (New Directions)
- Crooked Plow by Itamar Vieira Junior (Verso) - shortlisted for the International Booker Prize
- The Front by Edimilson de Almeida Pereira (Sundial House)

His own work includes the poetry collection Education by Windows.
