= Crônica =

Portuguese-language journalism genre

Crônica or crónica (chronicle; see spelling differences in Portuguese) is a Portuguese-language form of short writings about daily topics, published in newspaper or magazine columns. Crônicas are usually written in an informal, observational and sometimes humorous tone, as in an intimate conversation between writer and reader. Writers of crônicas are called cronistas.

Newspaper crônicas had their inception in the 19th century, with the development of the press, inspired by the French Journal des débats; they flourished in the mid-20th century, with the urbanization process, musing about daily happenings and becoming more informal in nature. Crônicas, despite their ephemeral nature, are often compiled in book anthologies.

Some authors known for their crônicas are Eça de Queiroz, Machado de Assis, Rubem Braga, Fernando Sabino, Clarice Lispector, Paulo Mendes Campos, Rachel de Queiroz and Luis Fernando Verissimo.
