= The Hour of the Star =

1977 novel by Clarice Lispector

- First edition (Portuguese)
- Author: Clarice Lispector
- Original title: A Hora da Estrela
- Translator: Giovanni Pontiero; Benjamin Moser (2011)
- Language: Portuguese
- Genre: Novel
- Publisher: José Olympio Editora
- Publication date: 1977
- Publication place: Brazil
- English publication date: 1986/1992 and 2011
- Media type: Print (Paperback)
- Pages: 86
- ISBN: 978-0-8112-1949-5
- OCLC: 24246408
- Dewey Decimal: 869.3 20
- LC Class: PQ9697.L585 H6713 1992
- Preceded by: Onde estivestes de noite (Where Were You At Night)
- Followed by: Um sopro de vida (pulsações) (A Breath of Life (pulsations))

The Hour of the Star (A hora da estrela, Brazilian Portuguese: [a ˈɔɾɐ da jsˈtɾelɐ]) is a novel by Clarice Lispector published in 1977, shortly before the author's death. In 1985, the novel was adapted by Suzana Amaral into a film of the same name, which won the Silver Bear for Best Actress in the 36th Berlin International Film Festival of 1986. It has been translated into English twice: by Giovanni Pontiero (published in the U.K. by Carcanet Press in 1986, and in the U.S. by New Directions in 1992); and by Benjamin Moser in 2011 (also published by New Directions).

== Themes ==
The Hour of the Star deals with the problems of the rural Northeast versus the urban Southeast of Brazil, poverty and the dream of a better life, and of an uneducated woman's struggle to survive in a sexist society. Lispector furthermore interrogates the relationship between author and subject, lending itself to be a precursor to her posthumously published novel 'A Breath of Life'. A toe dipped into the waters of imposed narratives upon those without a voice, the Hour of the Star positions itself as a critique of class perceptions and female suffering. Another prevalent theme is that of the narrator's powerful position in delivering the plot, including a form of intrusive narration in which the narrator speaks directly to the reader. In February 1977, Lispector gave her only televised interview, with Júlio Lerner of TV Cultura in São Paulo. In it, she mentioned a book she had just completed with "thirteen names, thirteen titles", referencing the thirteen alternative titles on the title page of the novella. (They are: "The Hour of the Star", "It's All My Fault", "Let Her Deal With It", "The Right to Scream", ".As for the Future.", "Singing the Blues", "She Doesn't Know How to Scream", "A Sense of Loss", "Whistling in the Dark Wind", "I Can't Do Anything", "Account of the Preceding Facts", "Cheap Tearjerker", and "Discreet Exit Through the Back Door".) According to her, the book is "the story of a girl who was so poor that all she ate was hot dogs. That's not the story, though. The story is about a crushed innocence, about an anonymous misery."

== Background and publication ==
Lispector used her own childhood in the Northeast region of Brazil as reference to build the protagonist Macabéa. She also mentioned a gathering of people from this region in the São Cristóvão neighborhood of Rio de Janeiro, where she first captured the "disoriented look" of the Northeasterners in the city. Lispector was also inspired by a fortune teller she visited, an event upon which she bases the final part of the plot. When she was leaving the fortune teller's house, she found it amusing to imagine herself being hit by a yellow Mercedes and dying immediately after hearing all the good projections the fortune teller foresaw for her future.

The novel was composed from short fragments that Lispector and her secretary, Olga Borelli, pieced together.

== Plot ==
Rodrigo S. M., the narrator, struggles from the very first page to begin a story he feels obligated to tell. He declares that he writes to capture the life of a northeastern girl from Alagoas, insisting his narrative will be spare and cold, devoid of literary adornment. He believes he must inhabit her poverty to tell the truth, describing his own unshaven face and exhausted body as proof of his commitment.

The girl is Macabea, a nineteen-year-old orphan living in a cramped tenement on Acre Street in Rio de Janeiro. She works as a typist for a pulley-distribution firm, though she is profoundly incompetent, making constant errors and dirtying the pages. She earns less than minimum wage and subsists almost entirely on hot dogs and coffee. Her body is underdeveloped, her shoulders slumped, and she is so unremarkable that she is invisible on the street. Macabea lacks any self-awareness, never having asked herself who she is; she simply exists, inhaling and exhaling. Her only real pleasures are her monthly trip to the cinema, painting her bitten fingernails red, and listening to the Clock Radio station, which broadcasts the time, culture, and advertisements, many of which she commits to memory.

Macabea's only coworker is Gloria, a chubby and sensual woman with a good heart. Gloria is well-fed, has a family, and possesses a carnal confidence. Macabea's boss, Mr. Raimundo Silveira, coldly warns her that he is only going to keep Gloria, citing Macabea's poor work.

She meets her first boyfriend, Olimpico de Jesus, a fellow northeasterner from Paraiba, in the pouring rain. He is a metalworker with a gold tooth and a violent, ambitious nature; he boasts of one day becoming a congressman. Olimpico is drawn to Macabea initially because they share the same harsh, dried-up origins, but he quickly grows irritated by her blankness and her odd, factual questions that never quite make sense. He shows her off by lifting her with one arm, but he drops her face-first into the mud. The relationship is hollow and strained, with Olimpico refusing to spend money on her except for a single coffee with milk.

The relationship ends abruptly when Olimpico meets Gloria. He immediately recognizes her as a superior product, dazzled by her "born and bred in Rio" status and the fact that her father works in a butcher shop. He dumps Macabea. She tries to console herself by buying a bright red lipstick and applying it grotesquely outside the lines of her lips, imitating a movie star.

Following Gloria's advice, Macabea skips work, takes the first taxi of her life, and visits a fortune-teller, Madame Carlota. The woman, a former prostitute and madam, is both coarse and kindly. After reading Macabea's cards, Madame Carlota gasps at the horror of her present life and then delivers a spectacular prophecy: Macabea's life will change completely the moment she leaves the house. Her boss will relent, her boyfriend will return to marry her, and a rich foreigner named Hans with blond hair and blue or green or brown or black eyes will arrive to shower her with love, satin, velvet, and a fur coat. Macabea feels a sudden and disorienting joy and stumbles outside, hopeful for her future.

As she steps off the curb into the darkening alley, Macabea is struck by a Mercedes. The car speeds away, and she lies on the pavement, seemingly dying. She curls into a fetal position on the gutter's edge, staring at a wisp of grass growing among the stones, and mentally repeats to herself that she is alive. She murmurs a phrase from one of the novel's titles, "as for the future," and then vomits a little blood. In that instant, she dies, the narrator declaring that the Prince of Darkness has won. Rodrigo S. M. closes his narrative by stating that Macabea is finally free of herself and of him, and that he is going home to light a cigarette, just as he remembers that it is strawberry season.

== Style ==
While the narrator in The Hour of the Star reveals to the audience his wish to ensure the novel's simplicity (in terms of writing) and stray from philosophical tangents, in reality the story is marked by complicated existentialist notions of identity. The author often reflects on his conscious effort to do so:

"Like every writer, I am clearly tempted to use succulent terms: I have at my command magnificent adjectives, robust nouns, and verbs so agile that they glide through the atmosphere as they move into action. For surely words are actions? Yet I have no intention of adorning the word, for were I to touch the girl's bread, that bread would turn to gold—and the girl … would be unable to bite into it, and consequently die of hunger."

As the novel unfolds, it becomes apparent that this quest for identity is as much about Macabéa's search for self as it is the narrator's own. Notions of being, who we are and who we aren't, and the struggle to finding meaning are all touched upon.

== Reception ==
Peter Bricklebank in his review for Library Journal described the novel as "both introspection and fiction" and that it was a "compassionate meditation with a fine afterward, this slim volume will attract lovers of philosophical fiction". Barbara Mujica in her review for Americas described the novel as "the last and perhaps greatest novel of the Brazilian writer Clarice Lispector" and that "The Hour of the Star is also a meditation on writing. Through Rodrigo, Lispector brings into question the notion of authorial supremacy. Rodrigo is not the omnipotent, invisible creator, but a thinker who doubts, vacillates, and questions his own work. In The Hour of the Star and other novels, Lispector throws into doubt the ability of fiction to capture the truth."
