= Family Ties (short story collection) =

- The first Brazilian edition.
- Author: Clarice Lispector
- Original title: Laços de família
- Illustrator: Cyro del Niro
- Cover artist: Cyro del Niro
- Language: Portuguese
- Genre: Short stories
- Publisher: Francisco Alves Editora
- Publication date: 1960
- Publication place: Brazil
- English publication date: 1984
- Media type: Print
- Preceded by: Alguns contos (Some Stories)
- Followed by: A maçã no escuro (The Apple in the Dark)

Family Ties (Laços de família in Portuguese) is a 1960 short story collection by the Brazilian writer Clarice Lispector.

== Short stories ==
Family Ties consists of thirteen short stories.

- "Daydreams of a Drunk Woman" ("Devaneio e embriaguez duma rapariga")
- "Love" ("Amor")
- "The Chicken" ("Uma galinha")
- "The Imitation of the Rose" ("A imitação da rosa")
- "Happy Birthday" ("Feliz aniversário")
- "The Smallest Woman in the World" ("A menor mulher do mundo")
- "The Dinner" ("O jantar")
- "Preciousness" ("Preciosidade")
- "Family Ties" ("Os laços de família")
- "The Beginnings of a Fortune" ("Começos de uma fortuna")
- "Mystery in São Cristóvão" ("Mistério em São Cristóvão")
- "The Crime of the Mathematics Professor" ("O crime do professor de matemática")
- "The Buffalo" ("O búfalo")

== Publication ==
Family Ties was published in 1960, after the Lispector's permanent return to Brazil from the United States. Several of the stories were written between 1943 and 1945. Lispector wrote O jantar in 1943. It was first published in the Rio de Janeiro newspaper A manhã in October 1946. The story O Crime do professor de matemática, was published, in an earlier version, as O Crime, in 1945 in another newspaper.

In 1952, Lispector published a short volume with these stories, and four others (Love, Mystery in São Cristóvão, The Beginnings of a Fortune, and The Chicken). The volume was titled Alguns contos (Some Stories), and was published by the Brazilian Ministry of Education and Health.

The rest of the stories in Family Ties were completed by March, 1955, but Lispector had trouble publishing them because the Ministry would not release the rights to them, despite Lispector's many requests.

== Major themes ==
Most of the stories centre on a character whose daily life—grocery shopping in "Love", a family gathering in "Happy Birthday"—is shattered by a sudden epiphany. Reflecting the author's own experience at the time, and as the title suggests, the characters in Family Ties are often housewives struggling to balance the demands of family and marriage with a wilder, less controllable life, symbolized by the experience of Ana in "Love", whose careful life breaks down when she is confronted with the wildness of a garden, in this case the Jardim Botânico of Rio de Janeiro.

== Literary significance and reception ==
The stories would eventually be recognized as a high point in Brazilian literature. Two of Brazil's most famous writers immediately recognized the importance of Family Ties. Fernando Sabino wrote that "you've written eight stories like nobody has come even close to writing in Brazil", adding that the book would be "exactly, sincerely, indisputably, and even humbly, the best book of stories ever published in Brazil". Erico Verissimo told her: "I haven't written about your book of stories out of sheer embarrassment to tell you what I think of it. Here goes: the most important story collection published in this country since Machado de Assis," who is Brazil's classic novelist.
