= Near to the Wild Heart =

1943 novel by Clarice Lispector

- The rare first Brazilian edition, published by the newspaper A Noite in December 1943.
- Author: Clarice Lispector
- Original title: Perto do coração selvagem
- Cover artist: Tomás Santa Rosa
- Language: Portuguese
- Genre: novel
- Publisher: A Noite Editora
- Publication date: 1943
- Publication place: Brazil
- English publication date: 1990 / 2012
- ISBN: 9780811220026
- OCLC: 916084920
- Dewey Decimal: 869.3
- LC Class: PQ9697.L585
- Followed by: O Lustre (The Chandelier)

Near to the Wild Heart (Perto do coração selvagem) is Clarice Lispector's debut novel, written from March to November 1942 and published around her twenty-third birthday in December 1943. The novel, written in a stream-of-consciousness style reminiscent of the English-language Modernists, centers on the childhood and early adulthood of a character named Joana, who bears strong resemblance to her author: "Madame Bovary, c'est moi", Lispector said, quoting Gustave Flaubert, when asked about the similarities. The book, particularly its revolutionary language, brought its young, unknown creator to great prominence in Brazilian letters and earned her the prestigious Graça Aranha Prize.

It has been translated into English twice, the first by Giovanni Pontiero in 1990, and again by Alison Entrekin in 2012.

== Background and publication ==
When Lispector began writing, in March 1942, she was still a law student at the Faculdade Nacional de Direito (National Law School) and working as a journalist. In February, she had transferred to the newspaper A Noite (The Night), then under the direction of the dictatorial Getúlio Vargas government. She had published some stories and journalism, and turned to one of her colleagues, Francisco de Assis Barbosa, for help with the novel she had begun writing. She pieced the book together by jotting down her ideas in a notebook whenever they occurred to her. To concentrate, she moved out of the tiny maid's room in the apartment she shared with her sisters and brother-in-law and spent a month in a nearby boardinghouse, where she worked intensely. At length the book took shape, but she feared it was more a pile of notes than a full-fledged novel. Her friend Lúcio Cardoso, a slightly older novelist, assured her that the fragments were a book in themselves. Barbosa read the originals chapter by chapter, but Lispector rejected his occasional suggestions: "When I reread what I’ve written," she told him, "I feel like I’m swallowing my own vomit."

Cardoso suggested a title, borrowed from James Joyce’s Portrait of the Artist as a Young Man: "He was alone. He was unheeded, happy, and near to the wild heart of life." This became the book’s epigraph, which, together with the occasional use of the stream-of-consciousness method, led certain critics to describe the book as "Joycean". The comparison annoyed Lispector, who had not read Joyce; she felt that the book was more reminiscent of Benedict de Spinoza, whom she had been reading at the time she wrote it.

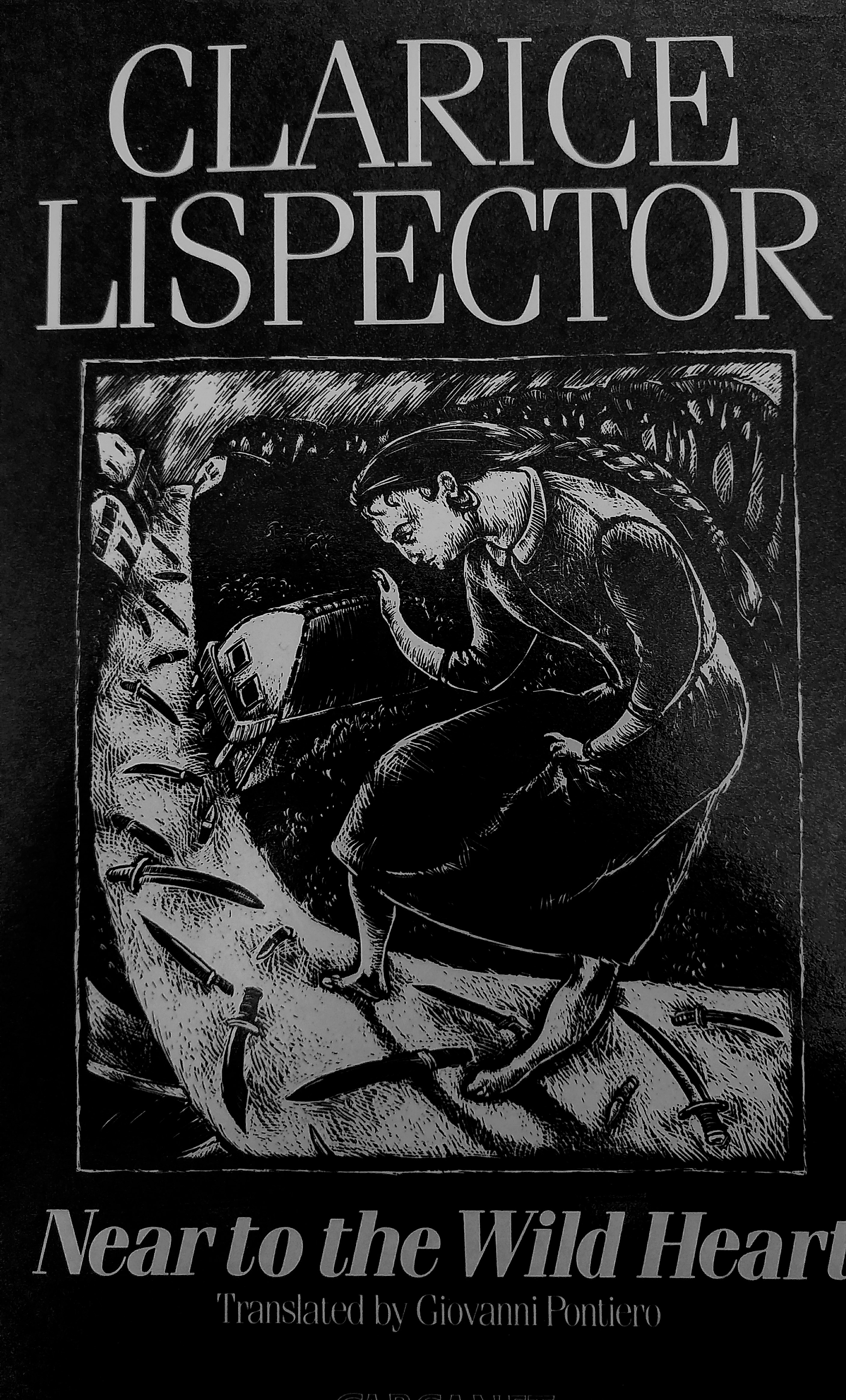
Cover art by Julia Robinson

Barbosa, who along with Cardoso was one of the book's first readers, recalled his amazement. "As I devoured the chapters the author was typing, it slowly dawned on me that this was an extraordinary literary revelation," Barbosa said. "The excitement of Clarice, hurricane Clarice." He steered it to the book-publishing wing of their employer, A Noite, where it appeared with a bright pink cover, typical for books by women, in December 1943. It was not a lucrative arrangement for the new author. "I didn’t have to pay anything [to have it published], but I didn’t make any money either. If there was any profit, they kept it," Lispector said. A thousand copies were printed; in lieu of payment, she got to keep a hundred. As soon as the book was ready, she began sending the book out to critics.

== Plot summary ==
Near to the Wild Heart does not have a conventional narrative plot. It instead recounts flashes from the life of Joana, between her present, as a young woman, and her early childhood. These focus, like most of Lispector's works, on interior, emotional states.

The book opens with a scene of the child Joana playing in the garden, making up poems for her father. Joana's wildness and barely suppressed violence, along with her linguistic creativity, are her most notable features. She is frequently compared to animals: over the course of the book Lispector compares her to a bird, a snake, a wildcat, a horse, and a dog. She commits transgressive acts—as a child she throws a book at an old man's head, for example, and as a married woman she leaves her husband, Otávio, and greets the news of his adultery—he has made another woman, his old friend Lídia, pregnant—with utter indifference. She professes an amoral philosophy: "Evil is not living, and that’s it. Dying is already something else. Dying is different from good and evil."

== Literary significance and criticism ==
Near to the Wild Heart was greeted as a revolution in Brazilian literature, though it was very rarely compared to the work of any Brazilian writer. Critics mentioned James Joyce, Virginia Woolf, Katherine Mansfield, Fyodor Dostoyevsky, Marcel Proust, André Gide, and Charles Morgan. Its language was noted as sounding completely un-Brazilian; the poet Lêdo Ivo wrote: “Clarice Lispector was a foreigner. … The foreignness of her prose is one of the most overwhelming facts of our literary history, and even of the history of our language.”

I met Clarice Lispector at the exact moment that she published Near to the Wild Heart. The meeting took place in a restaurant in Cinelândia. We had lunch and our conversation strayed from literary matters. … The least I can say is that she was stunning. It was autumn, the leaves in the square were falling, and the grayness of the day helped underscore the beauty and luminosity of Clarice Lispector. Alongside the foreign climate was that strange voice, the guttural diction which rings in my ears to this day.

At the time, Ivo called it "the greatest novel a woman had ever written in the Portuguese language". Other reviews were as enthusiastic. For almost a year after publication, articles about the book appeared continuously in every major city in Brazil. "The whole book is a miracle of balance, perfectly engineered," combining the "intellectual lucidity of the characters of Dostoevsky with the purity of a child." A Manhã (The Morning) had declared it to be "the greatest debut novel a woman had written in all of Brazilian literature."

== Awards and nominations ==
In October 1944, the book won the prestigious Graça Aranha Prize (Prêmio Graça Aranha) for the best debut novel of 1943. The prize was a confirmation of what the Folha Carioca had discovered earlier that year when it asked its readers to elect the best novel of 1943. Near to the Wild Heart won with 457 votes: a spectacular number, considering that only nine hundred copies had actually been put on sale.

== Influence ==
The third studio album by the Canadian rock duo Japandroids is called Near to the Wild Heart of Life in homage to Clarice Lispector's novel.

American dream pop band Dollshot named their second album and its title track single Lalande after the word and associated passage in Near to the Wild Heart.

The book has been published as part of the complete works of Clarice Lispector by New Directions under the editorial direction of Benjamin Moser.
