= Água Viva (novel) =

1973 novel by Brazilian writer Clarice Lispector

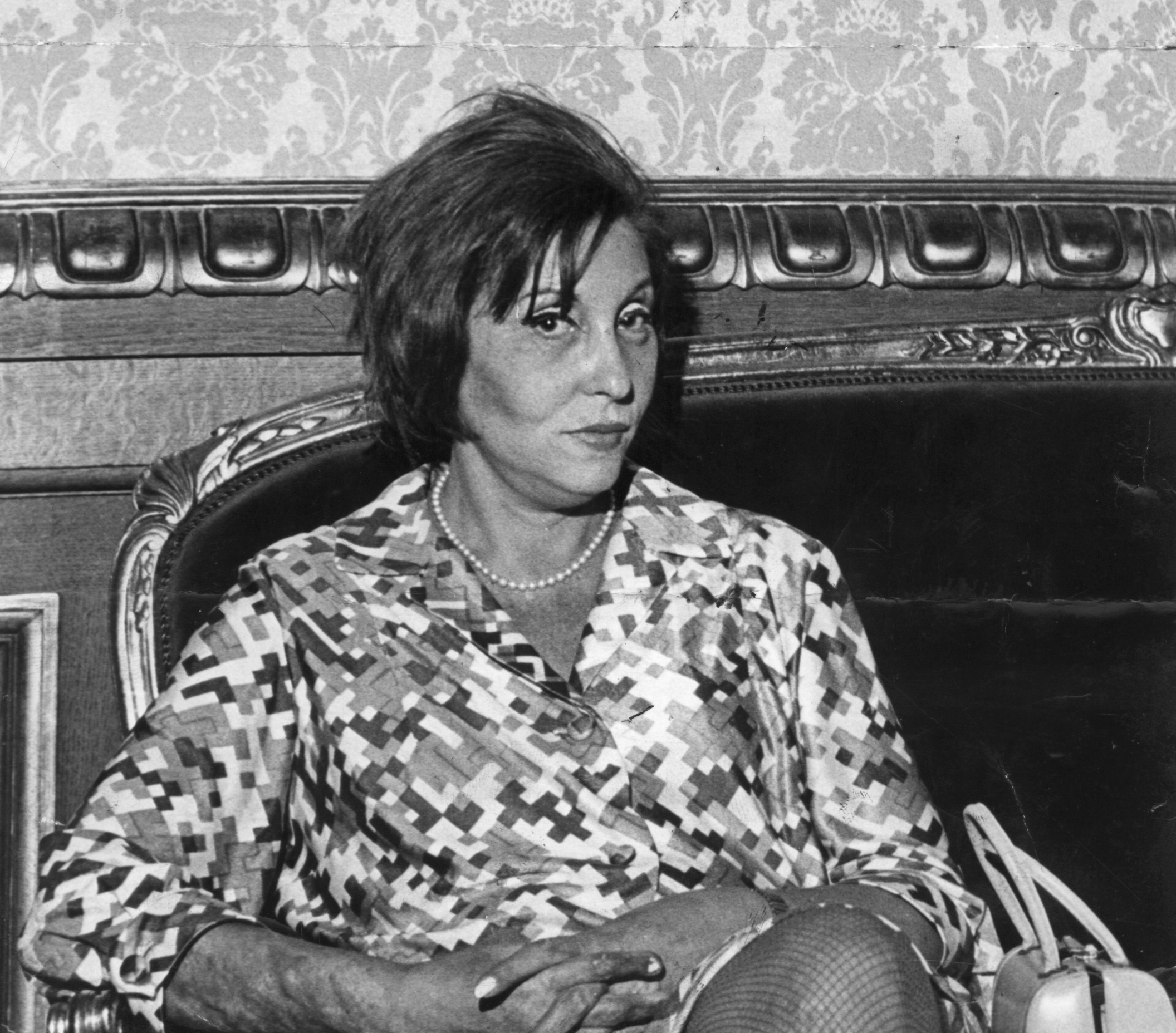
- Lispector in 1972, a year before the publication of Água Viva
- Author: Clarice Lispector
- Language: Portuguese
- Publication date: 1973

Água Viva (Portuguese: [ˈaɡwɐ ˈvivɐ]) is a 1973 novel by the Brazilian author Clarice Lispector. The novel has an unconventional form and uses no other form of structure than double paragraph breaks, lacking chapters or sections. It also does not feature conventional plot or named characters and is framed as a directionless monologue from an artist, perhaps speaking to a lover, the public, or the work itself. In the novel, Lispector states that her goal is to fire "an arrow that will sink into the tender and neuralgic centre of the word".

In Portuguese, Água Viva literally means "living water", a meaning that has been linked to the novel's fluid prose by some critics, but also denotes the oceanic animal known in English as jellyfish. In its first translation into English, published in 1989, it was titled Stream of Life.

== Background ==
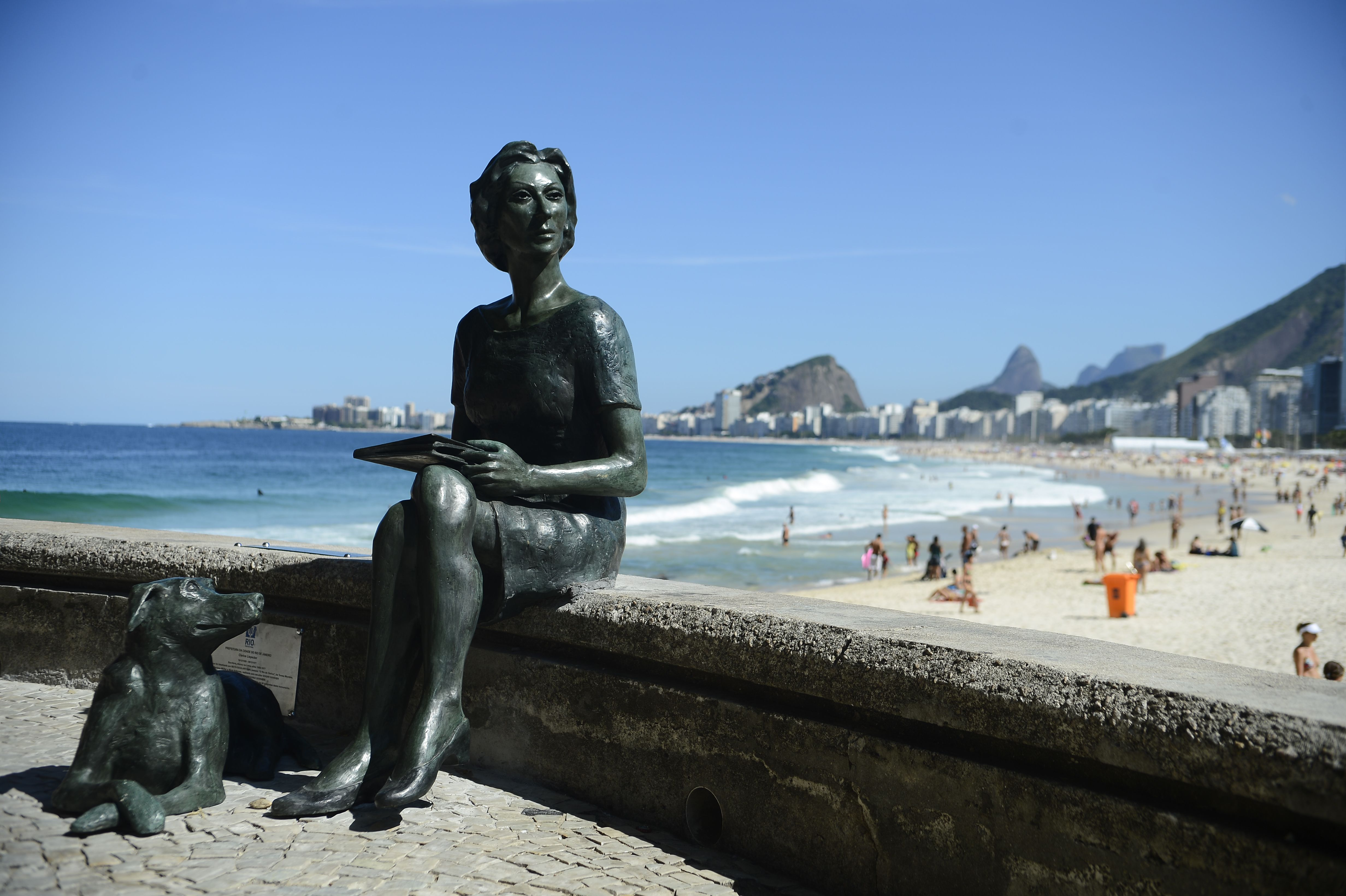
Statue of Lispector in Rio

Clarice Lispector was a Brazilian writer, most famous for her enigmatic and mystical 1964 novel The Passion According to G.H. According to the critic Alexandrino Severino, Água Viva arose out of an earlier 1971 draft Objeto Gritante (Loud Object) that Lispector edited down for clarity, though academic Sonia Roncador has held that the two works should be seen separately as complete literary works in their own right.

In 1966, Lispector was caught in a fire at her home in Rio de Janeiro which left her severely injured.

Some literary critics, most notably Benjamin Moser, have argued that the unhappy lives of her Jewish refugee parents, in particular the rape of her mother Mania in pogroms in the aftermath of the First World War in what is now Ukraine have cast a long shadow over her work. In the words of one critic, her writings become "personal, desperate, and ultimately claustrophobic" in the light of this familial trauma. This emphasis has been challenged by other scholars, especially in Brazil. Thiago Cavalcante Jeronimo argued in a 2018 essay, for example, that the rape of Lispector's mother, and its long-running emotional impact, was an "interpretive assumption" by Moser and had become "an incident 'proven without proof' by the biographer-who-fictionalizes".

== Reception ==
Hélène Cixous translated Água viva into French in 1980, and it formed an integral part of her seminars at Paris 8 University. Cixous argued that in the novel, Lispector "gives us, not books, but the living saved from books, from narratives, from repressive constructions".

Earl Fitz and Elizabeth Lowe, the latter of whom knew Lispector personally, were the first to translate Água Viva into English in 1989 for University of Minnesota Press.

Another translation of the novel into English by Stefan Tobler was published by New Directions Publishing in 2012 and then by Penguin Books in 2014, and Água Viva has since received significant literary attention, following the trajectory of the author herself from "virtually unknown to anglophone readers during her lifetime to become something of an icon".

Shannon Burns has written in the Sydney Review of Books that the novel was a "marvel of lyrical expression, a musical musing" that, despite its "straining Heideggerian neologisms", is "pure witchcraft." Addie Leak has argued that it is a "delicately glistening spiderweb of thoughts, an interior monologue at its most experimental".

Lispector herself had reservations about the novel, and Rob Doyle, writing in The Irish Times, thinks that in "one sense, she’s right – it’s bloody awful. The prose gushes with unfiltered emotion so that you don’t know where to look. And yet, there is a thrill in reading these breathless, fitfully coherent fragments, each deployed in a vain quest to capture the living moment of naked existence."
