= Budapeste =

Budapeste (English title: Budapest) is a 2003 novel by the Brazilian writer Chico Buarque. Originally published by Companhia das Letras, it was translated into English by Alison Entrekin in 2004. It is among the best-known literary works by Buarque, and was widely praised by critics upon its appearance. The Guardian reviewer Robert Collins compared it to a "perfectly cut gem", while the Independent called it a "magnificent, ambitious project". According to Caetano Veloso, Budapest is the "most beautiful of Buarque's three mature books". Apart from English, it has been translated into many other languages including Italian, Greek, French, German, Dutch, and Korean.

The plot deals with the travails of a Rio de Janeiro ghostwriter called Jose Costa who is struggling with the demands of work and family while simultaneously being fascinated by a chance encounter with the Hungarian language.
