= Manual of Painting and Calligraphy =

1977 novel by José Saramago

First edition (publ. Moraes Editores)

Manual of Painting and Calligraphy (Portuguese: Manual de Pintura e Caligrafia) is a novel by Nobel Prize-winning author José Saramago. It was first published in 1977. An English translation by Giovanni Pontiero was published in 1993. The plot of the novel involves H., who paints the industrialist S. and has an affair with his secretary.
