= Edimilson de Almeida Pereira =

Edimilson de Almeida Pereira is a Brazilian poet and author. He was born in 1963 in Juiz de Fora, Minas Gerais. An established poet, he received the 2021 Sao Paulo Prize for Literature for his novel The Front (translated into English by Johnny Lorenz).

He teaches literature at the Federal University of Juiz de Fora.
