= Walter Meierjohann =

- Occupation: Theatre director

1. Walter Meierjohann is a theatre director who has worked in the United Kingdom and Europe. He was the Artistic Director of Theatre at HOME, Manchester, having previously served as International Associate Director at the Young Vic in London under David Lan. He is also a founding member and director of AURICLE, an immersive sound and light company. He has directed theatre and opera productions in Britain, Germany and internationally and has taught throughout his career. In 2026, he was appointed Visiting Professor of Theatre and Directing at LAMDA.

== Early life and education ==
Meierjohann was born in Amsterdam and grew up in the Netherlands, the United States and Germany. He studied directing at the Ernst Busch Academy of Dramatic Arts in Berlin, where he was a contemporary of theatre director Thomas Ostermeier.

== Career ==
Meierjohann began his directing career in Germany. He subsequently became Artistic Director of NEUBAU, an international new-writing programme at the Staatsschauspiel Dresden.

In 2007, Meierjohann joined the Young Vic in London as International Associate Director under David Lan. His productions there included the European premiere of Tarell Alvin McCraney's In the Red and Brown Water starring Ashley Waters and Kafka's Monkey, adapted from Franz Kafka's A Report to an Academy and starring Kathryn Hunter. Kafka's Monkey subsequently toured internationally, including performances in Sydney, Melbourne, Athens, Paris, Istanbul, Tokyo, Taipei and New York.

In 2013, Meierjohann became Artistic Director of Theatre at HOME in Manchester. His productions there included The Funfair, adapted by Simon Stephens from Ödön von Horváth; The Emperor, based on the writings of Ryszard Kapuściński; Uncle Vanya; and a site-specific production of Romeo and Juliet staged at Victoria Baths. The Emperor was subsequently presented in New York.

Meierjohann has also directed independent productions in theatres across the United Kingdom and continental Europe.

== Blindness and AURICLE ==
In 2020, Meierjohann directed Blindness, an audio and light adaptation of José Saramago's 1995 novel, adapted for the stage by Simon Stephens and featuring the voice of Juliet Stevenson. The production premiered at the Donmar Warehouse in London and combined recorded narration, binaural sound, lighting and extended periods of darkness to create an immersive experience for audiences. It was among the first theatre productions to open in London following the COVID-19 lockdowns, using social distancing measures as part of its presentation.

Following its London run, Blindness toured internationally, with presentations including the Carré Theatre in Amsterdam, the Hong Kong Arts Festival, the Princess of Wales Theatre in Toronto, the Teatro de los Insurgentes in Mexico City, the Daryl Roth Theatre in New York, the Adelaide Festival, the Galway International Arts Festival and the Esplanade Theatre in Singapore.

Following the development of Blindness, Meierjohann became a founding member and director of AURICLE, alongside sound designers Ben and Max Ringham. Based in London, the company creates immersive sound and light experiences using binaural sound and other technologies.

== Teaching ==
In 2026, LAMDA announced Walter Meierjohann as the recipient of its Colin Cook International Fellowship and appointed him Visiting Professor of Theatre and Directing.

== Personal life ==
Meierjohann is married to dramaturg and festival director Petra Jane Tauscher. They live in London with their two daughters.
