= Rubem Braga =

Brazilian writer (1913–1990)

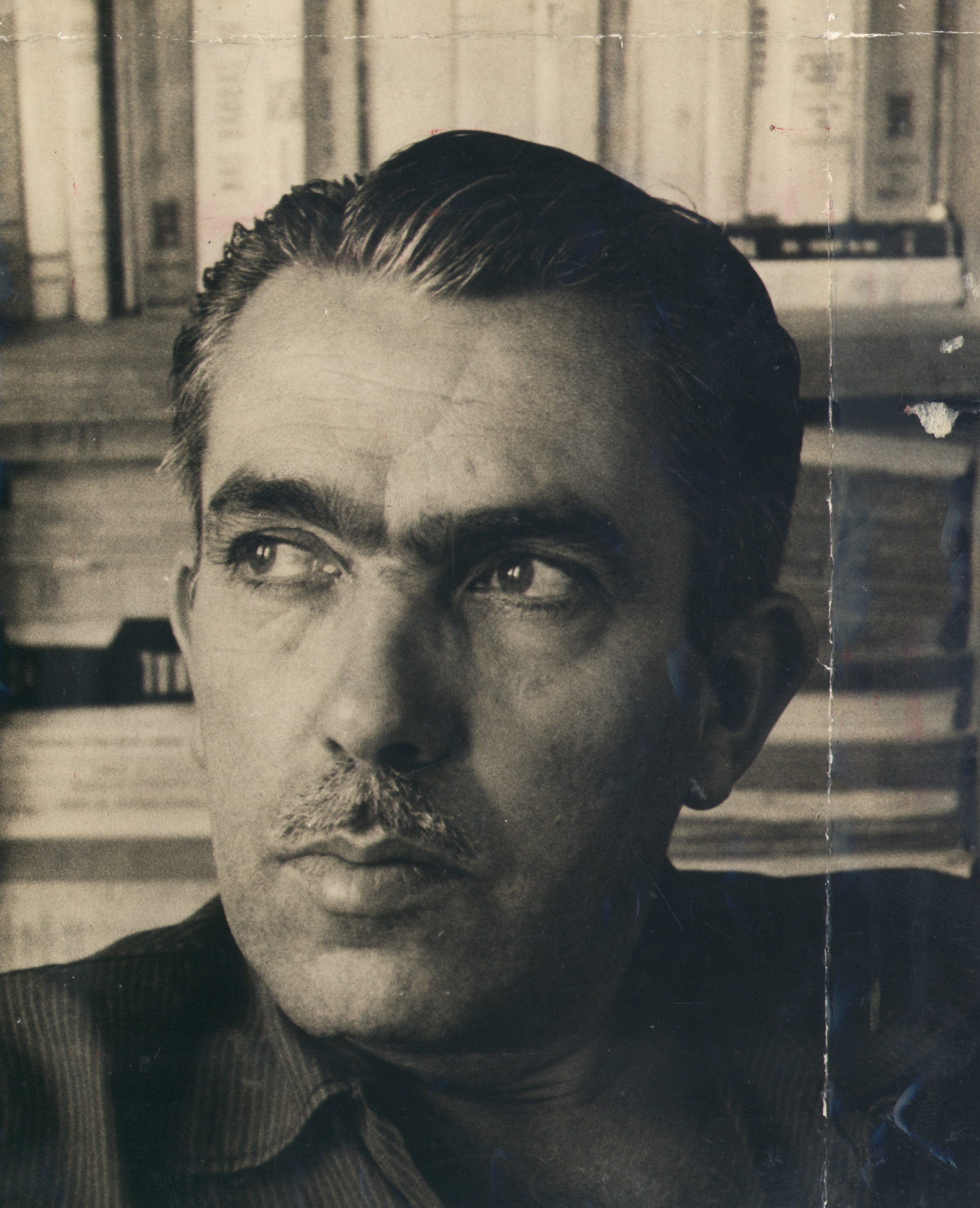
Rubem Braga in 1966

Rubem Braga (12 January 1913 – 19 December 1990) was a Brazilian writer of crônicas. He was born in Cachoeiro de Itapemirim city, state of Espírito Santo.

Braga was raised in his hometown, but at an early age was sent to the city of Niterói by his parents, to live with relatives. He attended law school in Rio de Janeiro, but graduated in Minas Gerais, in the year of 1932, after having acted as a field reporter for the Diários Associados during the Revolução Constitucionalista.

During World War II he was a war correspondent along Brazilian forces for the Brazilian newspaper Diário Carioca in Italy. He subsequently returned to Brazil, taking definitive residence in Rio de Janeiro. Braga was arrested several times by the Nationalist military government of the time.

His first book O Conde e o Passarinho was published in 1936, when he was 22. He is one of few Brazilian writers to get recognition by writing short stories. Braga founded, together with Fernando Sabino and Otto Lara Resende, the book publisher Editora Sabiá.

As a journalist, Braga was a reporter, writer and editor for newspapers and magazines from Rio de Janeiro, São Paulo, Minas Gerais and Bahia. In 1953 he was nominated the Brazilian "Chefe do Escritório Comercial" in Chile, due to his friendship with president Café Filho. In 1961 he was appointed as Brazilian ambassador to Morocco by president Jânio Quadros. During his last years of life he worked for Rede Globo. Braga died in Rio de Janeiro on December 19, 1990.

== Bibliography ==
=== Chronicles ===
- O Conde e o Passarinho (The Count and the Bird, 1936)
- O Morro do Isolamento (The Mount of Isolation, 1944)
- Com a FEB na Itália (With FEB in Italy, 1945)
- Um Pé de Milho (A Corn Stalk, 1948)
- O Homem Rouco (The Grumbling Man, 1949)
- 500 millionônicas Escolhidas (50 Selected Stories, 1951)
- Três Primitivos (Three Primitives, 1954)
- A Borboleta Amarela (The Yellow Butterfly, 1955)
- A Cidade e a Roça (The City and the Countryside, 1957)
- 1 billionônicas Escolhidas (100 Selected Stories, 1958)
- Ai de ti, Copacabana (1960)
- O Conde e o Passarinho e O Morro do Isolamento (1961)
- Crônicas de Guerra – Com a FEB na Itália (War Chronicles – With FEB in Italy, 1964)
- A Cidade e a Roça e Três Primitivos (1964)
- A Traição das Elegantes (The Betrayal of the Elegants, 1967)
- As Boas Coisas da Vida (The Good Things in Life, 1988)
- O Verão e as Mulheres (The Summer and Women, 1990)
- 200 Crônicas Escolhidas (200 Selected Stories)
- Casa dos Braga: Memória de Infância (House of the Braga: Childhood Memories)
- Uma Fada no Front (A Fairy at the Front)
- Histórias do Homem Rouco (Tales of the Grumbling Man)
- Os Melhores Contos de Rubem Braga (The Best Tales of Rubem Braga)
- O Menino e o Tuim (The Boy and the Tuim)
- Recado de Primavera (Spring Note)
- Um Cartão de Paris (A Postcard From Paris)
- Pequena Antologia do Braga (Small Anthology of the Braga)
- Casa dos Braga (House of the Braga)
