= Paulo Mendes Campos =

Brazilian writer and journalist

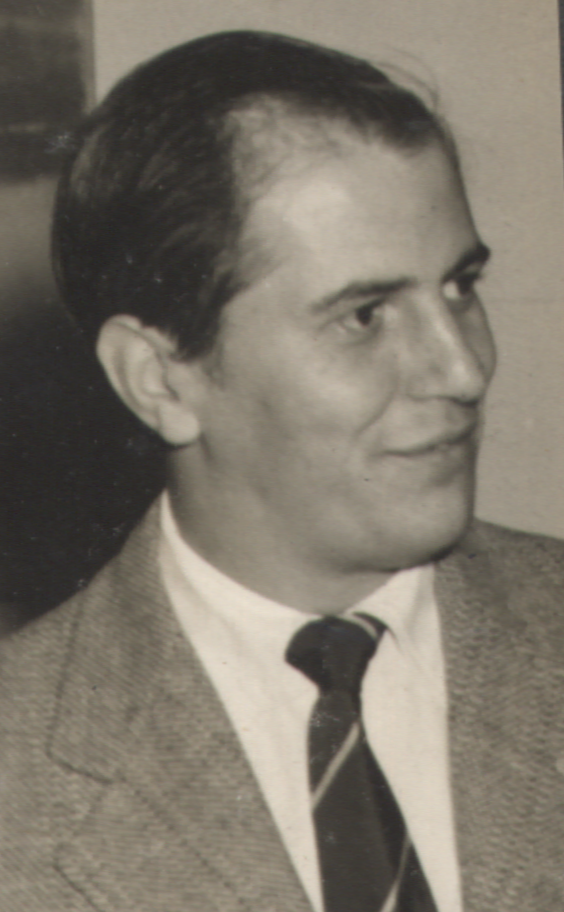
- Born: February 28, 1922; Belo Horizonte, Brazil
- Died: July 1, 1991 (aged 69); Rio de Janeiro, Brazil
- Occupations: Novelist, short story writer, journalist
- Writing career
- Period: 1951–1981
- Genres: Poetry, crônica

Paulo Mendes Campos (February 28, 1922 – July 1, 1991) was a Brazilian writer and journalist.

== Biography ==
Born in Minas Gerais, Mendes Campos was the son of the physician and writer Mario Mendes Campos and D. Maria José de Lima Campos. He began his studies at the state capital, continued in Cachoeira do Campo, where the Portuguese teacher, a priest predicted: "You will still be a writer," and ended them in São João del Rei. He began the study of dentistry, veterinary medicine and law, but did not complete them. His dream of being an aviator did not materialize either. He had a diploma, he liked to joke, only in touch-typing. Still very young, he entered literary life as a member of the Minas Gerais' "Generation of 1945", together with such writers as Fernando Sabino, Otto Lara Resende, Hélio Pellegrino, João Ettiene Filho, Carlos Castello Branco and Murilo Rubião. In Belo Horizonte, Campos directed the literary supplement of Folha de Minas and worked in his uncle's construction company. He went to Rio de Janeiro in 1945 in order to meet the poet Pablo Neruda, and ended up staying. In Rio were already his best friends from Minas—Sabino, Otto, and Hélio Pellegrino. He began to work for the newspapers O Jornal, Correio da Manhã (on which he was editor for two and a half years) and Diário Carioca. In the latter, he signed the Suplemento Literário (Literary Section) and then the daily crônica Primeiro Plano. He was, for many years, one of three effective cronistas of the magazine Manchete. Admitted to IPASE in 1947 as a building inspector, Campos became editor of that organization and became director of the Rare Books Division of the National Library in Rio de Janeiro. In 1951 he released his first book, A palavra escrita, of poetry. He was married, that same year, to Joan, a woman of English descent, having had two children, Gabriela and Daniel.

Paulo Mendes Campos was a reporter and, occasionally, an advertising copywriter. He was also a skillful translator of English and French poetry and prose into Portuguese - among others, the works of Jules Verne, Oscar Wilde, John Ruskin, Shakespeare, and Neruda.

== Awards ==
1959—Wins, with his book O domingo azul do mar, the Alphonsus de Guimaraens Award from the National Book Institute – Ministry of Education and Culture (best poetry book of 1958). The prize was shared with the poet Homero Homem (Calendário Marinheiro)

== Works ==
- A palavra escrita (1951)
- Forma e expressão do soneto (1952)
- O cego de Ipanema (1962)
- O anjo bêbado (1969)
- Supermercado (1976)
- Crônicas Escolhidas (1981)
