= A Breath of Life =

Novel by Clarice Lispector

A Breath of Life (Um sopro de vida, Brazilian Portuguese: [ũ ˈsopɾu dʒi ˈvidɐ]) is the last novel by Brazilian author Clarice Lispector. It was published posthumously in Brazil in the late 1970s. The book takes the form of dialogue between a male "Author" and his female creation, Angela Pralini (a character who shares a name with a character who appears in Lispector's Where Were You at Night). The god-like author infuses the so-called breath of life into his creation who speaks, breathes, lives and dies at his behest. The author loves yet wants to destroy Angela even though he can not ultimately separate her from himself, as they represent facets of the "Author's" personality.

The novel has been characterized as a lyrically schizoid duet between two distinct but overlapping voices which delve into the inner nature of thoughts, sensations, words, facts, and objects and the relations between each. The text is also said to confuse the two voices, and open up a wild space of contradiction and paradox.

When Lispector died she left behind a mountain of fragments that compose what became A Breath of Life. The fragments were structured and organized by Olga Borelli, Lispector's assistant and friend. The final form of the book reflects the dark interior dialogue that took place in Lispector's head near the end of her life.

In 2012, A Breath of Life was published for the first time in English by New Directions in a translation by Johnny Lorenz edited by Benjamin Moser.

== Plot ==
The plot centres around the "Author" (a thinly veiled Clarice Lispector) and his written creation, Angela Pralini. At first, the Author is preoccupied with the act of crafting Angela, in which he imbues his own thoughts and emotions into her and she becomes and extension of himself. However she represents vastly different facets of the Author which he himself doesn't outwardly express. Where he is withdrawn and vehemently logical, Angela is bright and childlike. Sensorally and emotionally, her cognition is akin to a child's, but she is capable of articulated these thoughts in a way that is uncannily aligned to their experiences.

However, the creation of Angela only develops through the constant conversation between the two, and it turns eventually to the metaphysical. She becomes aware of her own being, her own sense of self, and ultimately her creation. She begins to lament about God, and suffers an intense existential reckoning, which could mirror Clarice's own fears surrounding her impending death (in part a reason she wrote this book was to reconcile these fears.) Ultimately, after extensive meandering musings, the Author cedes that he must let Angela die in order to be fulfilled in life, and slowly but surely he begins to let Angela's ink and paper existence fade away.
