= Elisa Lispector =

Brazilian writer (1911–1989)

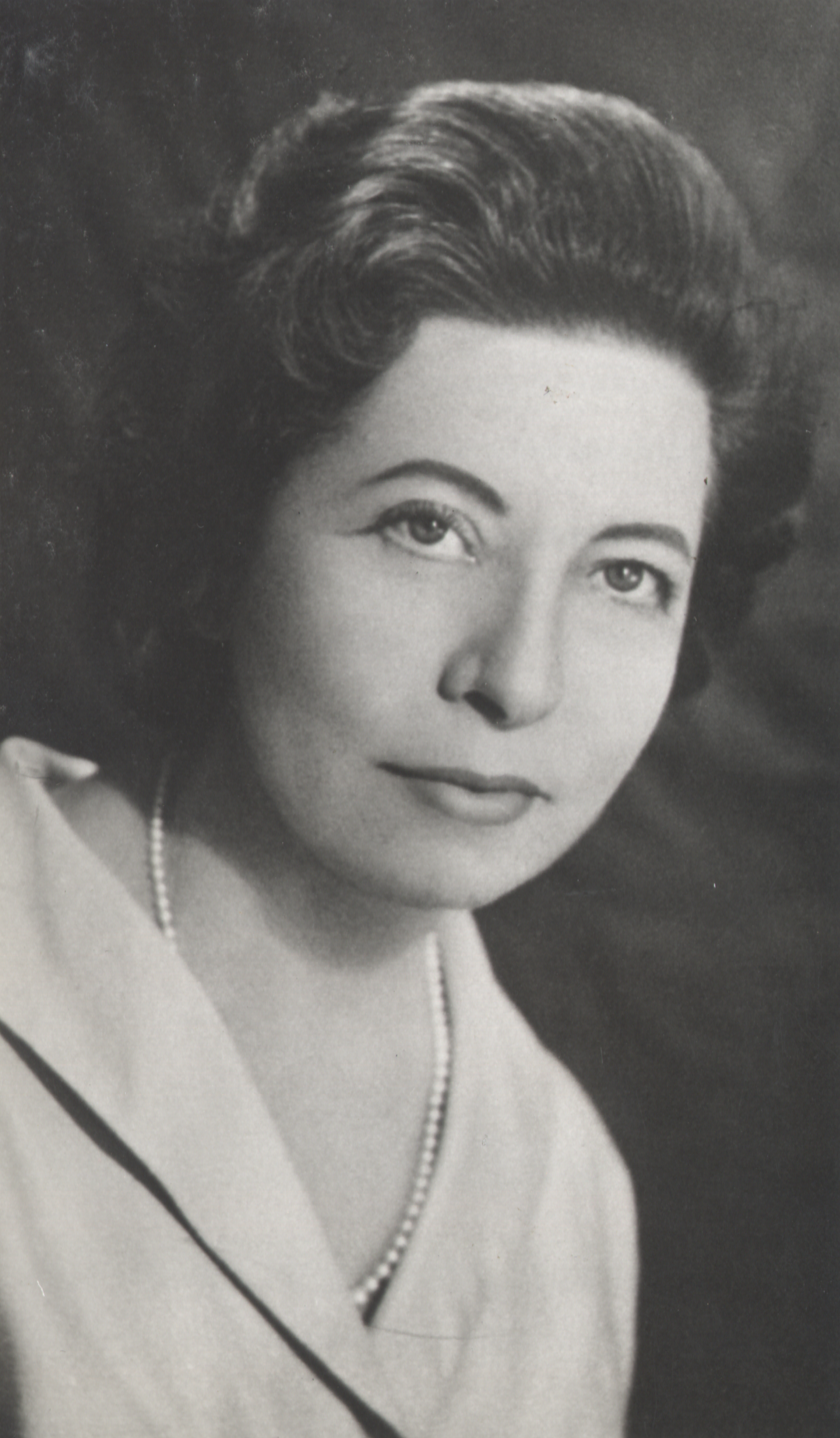
- Born: July 24, 1911; Savran, Russian Empire
- Died: January 6, 1989 (aged 77); Rio de Janeiro, Brazil
- Occupation: Novelist
- Relatives: Clarice Lispector (sister)

Elisa Lispector (born Leah Pinkhasovna Lispector; July 24, 1911 – January 6, 1989) was a Brazilian novelist.

She was the older sister of Clarice Lispector. The sisters' birthplace, Podolia, was at the time part of the Russian Empire, but is located in present-day western Ukraine.

== Life and work ==
In the civil war following the Russian Revolution of 1917, Ukrainian Jews were subjected to persecution. The Lispector family took refuge on several occasions in the interior towns of Ukraine, but in 1920, they boarded a ship bound for Brazil, arriving in Maceió in March 1922; here, they were received by Zaina, Mania's sister, and her husband and cousin José Rabin. On her father's initiative, they all changed their names except for her sister Tânia: her father was renamed Pedro; Mania, Marieta; Leia, Elisa; and Chaya, Clarice. Since childhood, Elisa devoted herself to reading works of fiction and the classics of world literature.

In 1925, they moved to Recife. Educated at the Normal School, Elisa worked as a children's teacher for several years; later, already in Rio de Janeiro, she joined the federal public administration, where she held high-ranking positions and functions. During that time, she also collaborated with several literary magazines.

She made her debut in literature in 1945 with the publication of the novel Além da Fronteira, the starting point of an extensive work marked by memories of escapes and persecutions confronted with the past and a sense of perpetual exile. She was included within the group of women writers ascribed to the "new Brazilian literature" of the 1940s, among whom were Helena Silveira (1911–1988), Ondina Ferreira (1909), Elsie Lessa (1914–2000), Lia Correia Dutra (1908–1989), Lúcia Benedetti (1914–1998) and Alina Paim (1919–2011), among others.

With the publication of O Muro de Pedras, a work in which she comments profusely on recurring themes of existentialism and which was recognized and praised by critics, she received the José Lins do Rego (1963) and Coelho Neto awards from the Brazilian Academy of Letters (1964).

== Bibliography ==
=== Novels ===
- Além da fronteira (Cia. Editora Leitura, 1945) - Across the Border. Reprinted by José Olympio Editora, 1988)
- No Exílio (Editora Pongetti, 1945) - In Exile. Reprinted by Ebrasa, 1971. Translated into the French (En exil), Éditions Des Femmes, 1987).
- Ronda solitária (A Noite Editora, 1954) - Solitary Walk.
- O muro de pedras (José Olympio Editora, 1962) - The Stone Wall
- O dia mais longo de Thereza (Gráfica Record Editora, 1965) - Thereza's Longest Day.
- A última porta (Editora Documentário, 1975) - The Last Door
- Corpo a corpo (Edições Antares, 1983) - Body to Body

=== Stories ===
- Sangue no sol (Ebrasa, 1970). Blood on the Sun.
- Inventário (Rocco, 1977). Inventory.
- O tigre de Bengala (José Olympio Editora, 1985). Includes some works previously published in Sangue no sol and Inventário.
