= Clarice Lispector =

Ukrainian-born Brazilian writer (1920–1977)

Clarice Lispector OMC
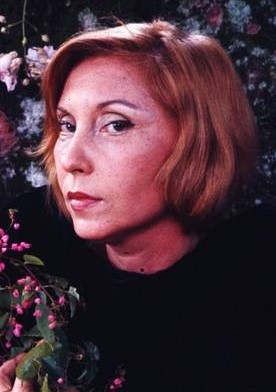
- Lispector in 1969
- Born: Chaya Pinkhasivna Lispector; December 10, 1920; Chechelnyk, Ukrainian SSR
- Died: December 9, 1977 (aged 56); Rio de Janeiro, Brazil
- Citizenship: Brazilian
- Education: Federal University of Rio de Janeiro (LL.B)
- Occupation: Writer
- Spouse: Maury Gurgel Valente (m. 1943; div. 1959)
- Children: 2
- Relatives: Elisa Lispector (sister)
- Writing career
- Pen name: Helen Palmer; Teresa Quadros
- Genres: Novel; short story
- Notable works: Near to the Wild Heart (1943); The Passion According to G.H. (1964); Family Ties (1960); Água Viva (1973); The Hour of the Star (1977)
- Website: claricelispector.com.br

Signature
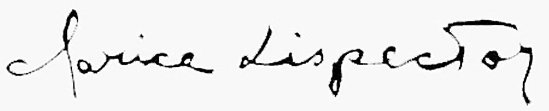

Clarice Lispector (Portuguese: [klaˈɾisi lisˈpɛktoʁ]; née Chaya Pinkhasivna Lispector; (Note: Ukrainian: Хая Пінкасівна Ліспектор; Yiddish: חיה פּינקאַסיװנאַ ליספּעקטאָר.) December 10, 1920 – December 9, 1977) was a Ukrainian-born Brazilian novelist and short story writer. Her distinctive and innovative works, which explore diverse narrative forms and themes of intimacy and introspection, have earned her international acclaim. She is known for works such as Near to the Wild Heart (1943) and The Hour of the Star (1977).

Clarice arrived in Brazil before she turned two years old, with her family, amidst the pogroms that followed the collapse of the Russian Empire. Born to a Jewish family in Podolia in Western Ukraine, she grew up in Recife, the capital of the northeastern state of Pernambuco, where her mother died when Clarice was nine. The family moved to Rio de Janeiro when she was in her teens. While in law school in Rio, she began publishing her first journalistic work and short stories, catapulting to fame at the age of 23 with the publication of her first novel, Near to the Wild Heart (Perto do Coração Selvagem), written as an interior monologue in a style and language that was considered revolutionary in Brazil.

In 1944, Lispector spent the next decade and a half in Europe and the United States due to her marriage to a Brazilian diplomat. After returning to Rio de Janeiro in 1959, she published the stories of Family Ties (Laços de Família) and the novel The Passion According to G.H. (A Paixão Segundo G.H.). Injured in an accident in 1966, she spent the last decade of her life in frequent pain, steadily writing and publishing novels and stories, including the celebrated Água Viva, until her premature death in 1977.

Lispector has been the subject of numerous books, and references to her and her work are common in Brazilian literature and music. Several of her works have been turned into films. In 2009, the American writer Benjamin Moser published Why This World: A Biography of Clarice Lispector. Since that publication, her works have been the object of an extensive project of retranslation, published by New Directions Publishing and Penguin Modern Classics, the first Brazilian to enter that prestigious series. Moser, who is also the editor of her anthology The Complete Stories (2015), describes Lispector as the most important Jewish writer in the world since Franz Kafka.

== Early life, emigration and Recife ==
Clarice Lispector was born Chaya Lispector in Chechelnyk, Podolia, a rural shtetl in the Ukrainian SSR. She was the youngest of three daughters of Pinkhas Lispector and Mania Krimgold Lispector. Her family suffered significantly in the pogroms that followed the collapse of the Russian Empire, circumstances later dramatized in her older sister Elisa Lispector's autobiographical novel No exílio (In Exile, 1948). They left in the winter of 1921, and they eventually managed to flee to Romania, from where they emigrated to Brazil, where her mother Mania had relatives. They sailed from Hamburg and arrived in Brazil in the early months of 1922, when Clarice was little more than one year old.

The Lispectors changed their names upon arrival. Pinkhas became Pedro; Mania became Marieta; Leah became Elisa, and Chaya became Clarice. Only the middle daughter, Tania (April 19, 1915 – November 15, 2007), kept her name. They first settled in the northeastern city of Maceió, Alagoas. Her mother, who was paralyzed, was in rapidly declining health during this period, possibly due to trauma-related hemiplegia (some speculate that Marieta was raped in the Ukraine pogroms, but this has not been confirmed), and, later, with tremors caused by Parkinson's disease. After three years, the Lispector family moved to the city of Recife, Pernambuco, settling in the neighbourhood of Boa Vista, where they lived at number 367 in the Praça Maciel Pinheiro and later in the Rua da Imperatriz.

In Recife, where her father continued to struggle economically, her mother finally died on September 21, 1930, aged 42, when Clarice was nine. Clarice attended the Colégio Hebreo-Idisch-Brasileiro, which taught Hebrew and Yiddish in addition to the usual subjects. In 1932, she gained admission to the Ginásio Pernambucano, then the most prestigious secondary school in the state. A year later, strongly influenced by Hermann Hesse's Steppenwolf, she "consciously claimed the desire to write".

In 1935, Pedro Lispector decided to move with his daughters to the then-capital, Rio de Janeiro, where he hoped to find more economic opportunity and also to find Jewish husbands for his daughters. The family lived in the neighborhood of São Cristóvão, north of downtown Rio, before moving to Tijuca. In 1937, she entered the Law School of the University of Brazil, then one of the most prestigious institutions of higher learning in the country. Her first known story, "Triunfo", was published in the magazine Pan on May 25, 1940. Soon afterwards, on August 26, 1940, as a result of a botched gallbladder operation, her father died, aged 55.

While still in law school, Clarice began working as a journalist, first at the official government press service the Agência Nacional and then at the important newspaper A Noite. Lispector would come into contact with the younger generation of Brazilian writers, including Lúcio Cardoso, with whom she fell in love. Cardoso was gay, however, and she soon began seeing a law school colleague named Maury Gurgel Valente, who had entered the Brazilian Foreign Service, known as Itamaraty. Eager to be recognised as Brazilian, she applied for citizenship the moment she turned 21, the earliest age that law allowed, and was naturalised January 12, 1943. Eleven days later she married Gurgel.

=== Near to the Wild Heart ===
In December 1943, Lispector published her first novel, Perto do coração selvagem (Near to the Wild Heart). The novel, which tells of the inner life of a young woman named Joana, caused a sensation. In October 1944, the book won the prestigious Graça Aranha Prize for the best debut novel of 1943. One critic, the poet Lêdo Ivo, called it "the greatest novel a woman has ever written in the Portuguese language." Another wrote that Lispector had "shifted the center of gravity around which the Brazilian novel had been revolving for about twenty years". "Clarice Lispector's work appears in our literary world as the most serious attempt at the introspective novel," wrote the São Paulo critic Sérgio Milliet. "For the first time, a Brazilian author goes beyond simple approximation in this almost virgin field of our literature; for the first time, an author penetrates the depths of the psychological complexity of the modern soul."

This novel, like all of her subsequent works, was marked by an intense focus on interior emotional states. When the novel was published, many claimed that her stream-of-consciousness writing style was heavily influenced by Virginia Woolf or James Joyce, but she only read these authors after the book was ready. The epigraph from Joyce and the title, which is taken from Joyce's A Portrait of the Artist as a Young Man, were both suggested by Lúcio Cardoso.

Shortly afterwards, Lispector and Maury Gurgel left Rio for the northern city of Belém, in the state of Pará, at the mouth of the Amazon. There, Maury served as a liaison between the Foreign Ministry and the Allies who were using northern Brazil as a military base in World War II.

== Europe and the United States ==
On July 29, 1944, Lispector left Brazil for the first time since she had arrived as a child, destined for Naples, where Gurgel was posted to the Brazilian Consulate. Naples was the staging post for the troops of the Brazilian Expeditionary Force whose soldiers were fighting on the Allied side against the Nazis. She worked at the city's military hospital, taking care of wounded Brazilian troops

In Rome, Lispector met the Italian poet Giuseppe Ungaretti, who translated parts of Near to the Wild Heart, and had her portrait painted by Giorgio de Chirico. In Naples, she completed her second novel, O Lustre (The Chandelier, 1946), which like the first focused on the interior life of a girl, this time one named Virgínia. This longer and more difficult book also met with an enthusiastic critical reception, although it had a lower impact than Near to the Wild Heart. Gilda de Melo e Sousa wrote, "Possessed of an enormous talent and a rare personality, she will have to suffer, fatally, the disadvantages of both, since she so amply enjoys their benefits."

After a short visit to Brazil in 1946, Lispector and Gurgel returned to Europe in April 1946, where he was posted to the embassy in Bern, Switzerland. This was a time of considerable boredom and frustration for Lispector, who was often depressed. "This Switzerland," she wrote her sister Tania, "is a cemetery of sensations." Her son Pedro Gurgel Valente was born in Bern on September 10, 1948, and in the city she wrote her third novel, A cidade sitiada (The Besieged City, 1946).

In Switzerland, in Bern, I lived on the Gerechtigkeitsgasse, that is, Justice Street. In front of my house, in the street, was the colored statue, holding the scales. Around, crushed kings begging perhaps for a pardon. In the winter, the little lake in the middle of which the statue stood, in the winter the freezing water, sometimes brittle with a thin layer of ice. In the spring red geraniums … And the still-medieval street: I lived in the old part of the city. What saved me from the monotony of Bern was living in the Middle Ages, it was waiting for the snow to pass and for the red geraniums to be reflected once again in the water, it was having a son born there, it was writing one of my least liked books, The Besieged City, which, however, people come to like when they read it a second time; my gratitude to that book is enormous: the effort of writing it kept me busy, saved me from the appalling silence of Bern, and when I finished the last chapter I went to the hospital to give birth to the boy.

The book Lispector wrote in Bern, The Besieged City, tells the story of Lucrécia Neves, and the growth of her town, São Geraldo, from a little settlement to a large city. The book, which is full of metaphors of vision and seeing, met with a tepid reception and was "perhaps the least loved of Clarice Lispector's novels", according to a close friend of Lispector's. Sérgio Milliet concluded that "the author succumbs beneath the weight of her own richness." And the Portuguese critic João Gaspar Simões wrote: "Its hermeticism has the texture of the hermeticism of dreams. May someone find the key."

After leaving Switzerland in 1949 and spending almost a year in Rio, Lispector and Gurgel traveled to Torquay, Devon, where he was a delegate to the General Agreement on Tariffs and Trade (GATT). They remained in England from September 1950 until March 1951. Lispector liked England, though she suffered a miscarriage on a visit to London.

In 1952, back in Rio, where the family would stay about a year, Lispector published a short volume of six stories called Alguns contos (Some Stories) in a small edition sponsored by the Ministry of Education and Health. These stories formed the core of the later Laços de família (Family Ties), 1960. She also worked under the pseudonym Teresa Quadros as a women's columnist at the short-lived newspaper Comício.

In September 1952, the family moved to Washington, D.C., where they would live until June 1959. They bought a house at 4421 Ridge Street in the suburb of Chevy Chase, Maryland. On February 10, 1953, Lispector gave birth to her second son, Paulo. She grew close to the Brazilian writer Érico Veríssimo, then working for the Organization of American States, and his wife Mafalda, as well as to the wife of the ambassador, Alzira Vargas, daughter of the former Brazilian dictator Getúlio Vargas. She also began publishing her stories in the new magazine Senhor, back in Rio. But she was increasingly discontented with the diplomatic milieu. "I hated it, but I did what I had to […] I gave dinner parties, I did everything you're supposed to do, but with a disgust…" She increasingly missed her sisters and Brazil, and in June 1959, she left her husband and returned with her sons to Rio de Janeiro, where she would spend the rest of her life.

== Later years ==
=== Family Ties ===
In Brazil, Lispector struggled financially and tried to find a publisher for the novel she had completed in Washington several years before, as well as for her book of stories, Laços de família (Family Ties). This book included the six stories of Some Stories along with seven new stories, some of which had been published in Senhor. It was published in 1960. The book, her friend Fernando Sabino wrote her, was "exactly, sincerely, indisputably, and even humbly, the best book of stories ever published in Brazil." And Érico Veríssimo said: "I haven't written about your book of stories out of sheer embarrassment to tell you what I think of it. Here goes: the most important story collection published in this country since Machado de Assis", Brazil's classic novelist.

=== The Apple in the Dark ===
A Maçã no escuro (The Apple in the Dark), which Lispector had begun in Torquay, had been completed in 1956 but was repeatedly rejected by publishers, to Lispector's despair. Her longest novel and perhaps her most complex, it was finally published in 1961 by the same house that had published Family Ties, the Livraria Francisco Alves in São Paulo. Driven by interior dialogue rather than by plot, its purported subject is a man called Martim, who believes he has killed his wife and flees deep into the Brazilian interior, where he finds work as a farm laborer. The real concerns of the highly allegorical novel are language and creation. In 1962, the work was awarded the Carmen Dolores Barbosa Prize for the best novel of the previous year. Around this time she began a relationship with the poet Paulo Mendes Campos, an old friend. Mendes Campos was married and the relationship did not endure.

=== The Passion According to G.H. and The Foreign Legion ===
In 1964, Lispector published one of her most shocking and famous books, A paixão segundo G.H., about a woman who, in the maid's room of her comfortable Rio penthouse, endures a mystical experience that leads to her eating part of a cockroach. In the same year, she published another book of stories and miscellany, The Foreign Legion.

The American translator Gregory Rabassa, who first encountered Lispector in the mid-1960s, at a conference on Brazilian literature, in Texas, recalled being "flabbergasted to meet that rare person [Lispector] who looked like Marlene Dietrich and wrote like Virginia Woolf".

On September 14, 1966, Lispector suffered a serious accident in her apartment. After taking a sleeping pill, she fell asleep in her bed with a lit cigarette. She was seriously injured and her right hand almost had to be amputated.

The fire I suffered a while back partially destroyed my right hand. My legs were marked forever. What happened was very sad and I prefer not to think about it. All I can say is that I spent three days in hell, where—so they say—bad people go after death. I don't consider myself bad and I experienced it while still alive.

The next year, Lispector published her first children's book, O Mistério do coelho pensante (The Mystery of the Thinking Rabbit, 1967), a translation of a book she had written in Washington, in English, for her son Paulo. In August 1967, she began writing a weekly column ("crônica") for the Jornal do Brasil, an important Rio newspaper, which greatly expanded her fame beyond the intellectual and artistic circles that had long admired her. These pieces were later collected in the posthumous work A Descoberta do mundo (The Discovery of the World, 1984).

=== The Woman Who Killed the Fish and An Apprenticeship or The Book of Pleasures ===
In 1968, Lispector participated in the political demonstrations against Brazil's hardening military dictatorship, and also published two books: her second work for children, A Mulher que matou os peixes (The Woman Who Killed the Fish), in which the narrator, Clarice, confesses to having forgotten to feed her son's fish, and An Apprenticeship or The Book of Pleasures.

Her first novel since G.H., Uma Aprendizagem ou O Livro dos Prazeres was a love story between a primary teacher, Lóri, and a philosophy teacher, Ulisses. The book drew on her writings in her newspaper columns, as she conducted interviews for the glossy magazine Manchete. The book received a new translation in April 2021 by New Directions. Cleveland Review of Books called it "a novel about the distance between people, but also the distances between the self and the self, the self and 'the God.'"

=== Covert Joy and Água Viva (The Stream of Life) ===
In 1971, Lispector published another book of stories, Felicidade clandestina (Covert Joy), several of which hearkened back to memories of her childhood in Recife. She began working on the book that many would consider her finest, Água Viva (The Stream of Life), though she struggled to complete it. Olga Borelli, a former nun who entered her life around this time and became her faithful assistant and friend, recalled:

She was insecure and asked a few people for their opinion. With other books Clarice didn't show that insecurity. With Água viva she did. That was the only time I saw Clarice hesitate before handing in a book to the publisher. She herself said that.

When the book came out in 1973, it was instantly acclaimed as a masterpiece. "With this fiction," one critic wrote, "Clarice Lispector awakens the literature currently being produced in Brazil from a depressing and degrading lethargy and elevates it to a level of universal perennity and perfection." The book is an interior monologue with an unnamed first person narrator to an unnamed "you", and has been described as having a musical quality, with the frequent return of certain passages. Água viva was first translated into English in 1978 as The Stream of Life, with a new translation by Stefan Tobler published in 2012.

=== Where Were You at Night and The Via Crucis of the Body ===
In 1974, Lispector published two books of stories, Onde estivestes de noite (Where Were You at Night)—which focuses in part on the lives of aging women—and A via crucis do corpo (The Via Crucis of the Body). Though her previous books had often taken her years to complete, the latter was written in three days, after a challenge from her publisher, Álvaro Pacheco, to write stories about themes relating to sex. Part of the reason she wrote so much may have had to do with her having been unexpectedly fired from the Jornal do Brasil at the end of 1973, which put her under increasing financial pressure. She began to paint and intensified her activity as a translator, publishing translations of Agatha Christie, Oscar Wilde, and Edgar Allan Poe.

In 1975 she was invited to the First World Congress of Sorcery in Bogotá, an event which garnered wide press coverage and increased her notoriety. At the conference, her story "The Egg and the Hen", first published in The Foreign Legion, was read in English.

"The Egg and the Hen" is mysterious and does indeed have a bit of occultism. It is a difficult and profound story. That is why I think the audience, very mixed, would have been happier if I had pulled a rabbit out of my hat. Or fallen into a trance. Listen, I never did anything like that in my life. My inspiration does not come from the supernatural, but from unconscious elaboration, which comes to the surface as a kind of revelation. Moreover, I don't write in order to gratify anybody else.

=== A Breath of Life and The Hour of the Star ===
Lispector worked on a book called Um sopro de vida: pulsações (A Breath of Life: Pulsations) that would be published posthumously in the mid-1970s. The book consists of a dialogue between an “Author” and his creation, a character whose name was borrowed from a story in Where Were You at Night.

In a 2025 essay titled "Escribir para no morir", Peruvian writer Gunter Silva Passuni describes Lispector's posthumous book A Breath of Life as neither a conventional novel nor a diary, but a text assembled from fragments in which writing is figured as a way of “continuing to breathe” while facing death. He notes that the book is structured as a dialogue between two voices—the Author and Angela Pralini—whose exchanges stage a tension between reason and intuition, reflective control and intuitive surrender, repeatedly asking who speaks when one writes and what remains of the self at the edge of life. Silva further characterizes the prose as a “state of consciousness” prior to language, where thinking and feeling are no longer distinguishable.

Lispector's final novel, A Hora da estrela (The Hour of the Star, 1977), was also written in a fragmentary form piecing the story together, with the help of Olga Borelli, from notes scrawled on loose bits of paper. The Hour of the Star tells the story of Macabéa, one of the iconic characters in Brazilian literature, a starving, poor typist from Alagoas, the state where Lispector's family first arrived, lost in the metropolis of Rio de Janeiro. Macabéa's name refers to the Maccabees, and is one of the very few overtly Jewish references in Lispector's work. Its explicit focus on Brazilian poverty and marginality was also new.

== Death ==
Shortly after The Hour of the Star was published, Lispector was admitted to the hospital. She had inoperable ovarian cancer, though she was not told the diagnosis. She died on the eve of her 57th birthday and was buried on December 11, 1977, at the Jewish Cemetery of Caju, Rio de Janeiro.

== Awards and honors ==
- 1944 Graça Aranha national prize for fiction for Near to the Wild Heart
- 1961 Cármen Dolores Barbosa Prize for The Apple in the Dark
- Lispector won a prize from the Campanha Nacional da Criança for “O mistério do coelho pensante” (the mystery of the thinking rabbit) in 1967.
- 1969 Golfinho de Ouro Prize for An Apprenticeship
- First prize in the tenth Concurso Literário Nacional in 1976 for her contributions to Brazilian literature.
- 2013 Best Translated Book Award, shortlist, A Breath of Life: Pulsations
- 2016 PEN Translation Prize, winner, The Complete Stories, trans. Katrina Dodson
- In 2018 a Google Doodle was created to celebrate her 98th birthday.

== Bibliography ==
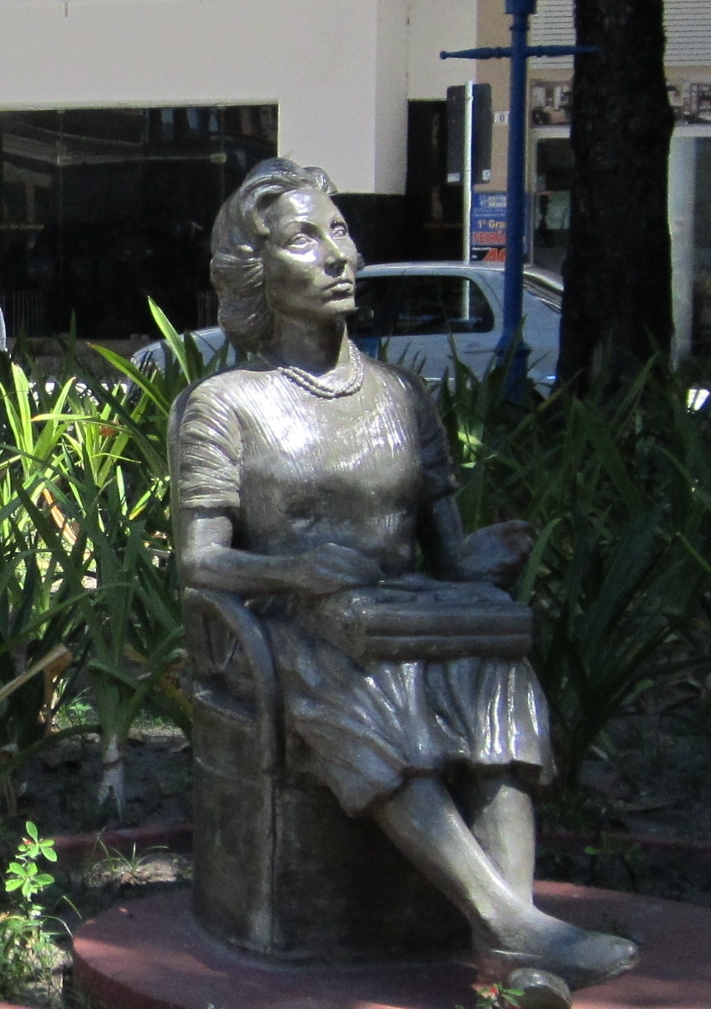
Statue of Lispector in Recife

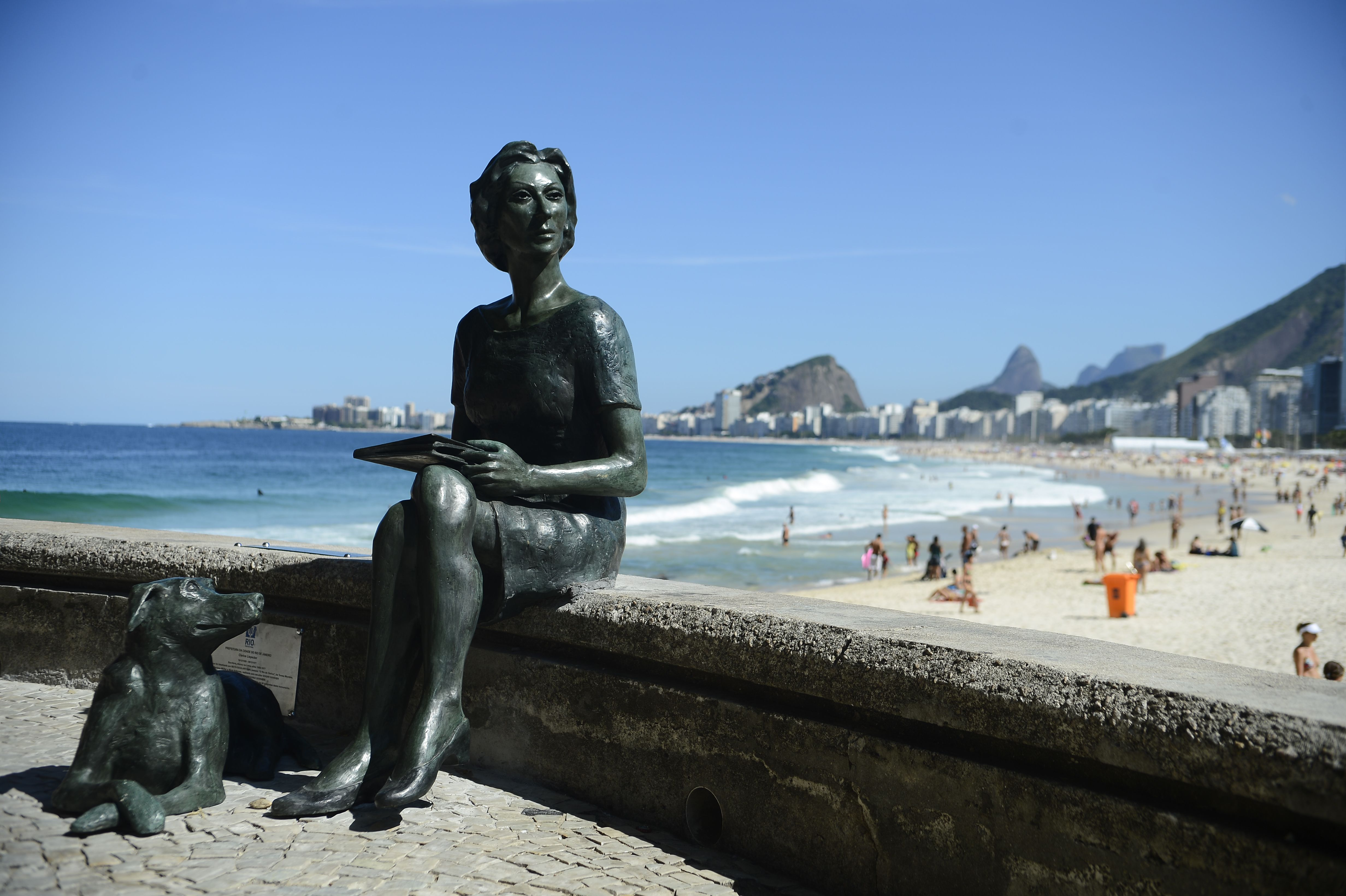
Statue of Lispector in Rio de Janeiro

=== Novels ===
- Near to the Wild Heart (1943) Translated in 1990 by Giovanni Pontiero and in 2012 by Alison Entrekin
- The Chandelier (1946) Translated in 2018 by Benjamin Moser and Magdalena Edwards
- The Besieged City (1949) Translated in 2019 by Johnny Lorenz
- The Apple in the Dark (1961) Translated in 1967 by Gregory Rabassa and in 2023 by Benjamin Moser
- The Passion According to G.H. (1964) Translated in 1988 by Ronald Sousa and in 2012 by Idra Novey
- An Apprenticeship or The Book of Pleasures (1968) Translated in 1986 by Richard A. Mazzara and Lorri A. Parris; translated in 2021 by Stefan Tobler
- Água Viva (1973) Translated in 1978 by Elizabeth Lowe and Earl Fitz as The Stream of Life; translated in 2012 by Stefan Tobler retaining original title
- The Hour of the Star (1977) Translated in 1992 by Giovanni Pontiero and in 2011 by Benjamin Moser
- A Breath of Life (posthumous, 1978) Translated in 2012 by Johnny Lorenz

=== Short story collections ===
- Alguns contos (1952) – Some Stories
- Laços de família (1960) – Family Ties. Includes works previously published in Alguns Contos.
- A legião estrangeira (1964) – The Foreign Legion
- Felicidade clandestina (1971) – Covert Joy
- A imitação da rosa (1973) – The Imitation of the Rose. Includes previously published material.
- A via crucis do corpo (1974) – The Via Crucis of the Body
- Onde estivestes de noite (1974) – Where You Were at Night
- Para não esquecer (1978) – Not to Forget
- A bela e a fera (1979) – Beauty and the Beast
- The Complete Stories (2015) – Translated by Katrina Dodson

=== Children's literature ===
- O Mistério do Coelho Pensante (1967) – The Mystery of the Thinking Rabbit
  - The Mystery of the Thinking Rabbit. New York Review of Books. April 8, 2025. ISBN 978-1-68137-898-5.
- A mulher que matou os peixes (1968) – The Woman Who Killed the Fish
  - The Woman Who Killed the Fish, trans. Benjamin Moser (New Directions, 2022)
- A Vida Íntima de Laura (1974) – Laura's Intimate Life
- Quase de verdade (1978) – Almost True
  - Almost True. New York Review of Books. April 8, 2025. ISBN 978-1-68137-897-8.
- Como nasceram as estrelas: Doze lendas brasileiras (1987) – How the Stars were Born: Twelve Brazilian Legends

=== Journalism and other shorter writings ===
- A Descoberta do Mundo (1984) – The Discovery of the World (named Selected Chronicas in the English version). Lispector's newspaper columns in the Jornal do Brasil.
- Visão do esplendor (1975) – Vision of Splendor
- De corpo inteiro (1975) – With the Whole Body. Lispector's interviews with famous personalities.
- Aprendendo a viver (2004) – Learning to Live. A selection of columns from The Discovery of the World.
- Outros escritos (2005) – Other Writings. Diverse texts including interviews and stories.
- Correio feminino (2006) – Ladies' Mail. Selection of Lispector's texts, written pseudonymously, for Brazilian women's pages.
- Entrevistas (2007) – Interviews
- Todas as Crónicas (2018). Too Much of Life: The Complete Crônicas, trans. Margaret Jull Costa and Robin Patterson (New Directions, 2022)

=== Correspondence ===
- Cartas perto do coração (2001) – Letters near the Heart. Letters exchanged with Fernando Sabino.
- Correspondências (2002) – Correspondence
- Minhas queridas (2007) – My dears. Letters exchanged with her sisters Elisa Lispector and Tania Lispector Kaufmann.

== See also ==
- Brazilian literature
- Why This World: A Biography of Clarice Lispector
- Benjamin Moser

== Sources ==
- Moser, Benjamin (July 1, 2009). Why This World: A Biography of Clarice Lispector. Oxford University Press. p. 32. ISBN 978-0-19-974392-6.
