= Fernando Sabino =

Brazilian writer and journalist

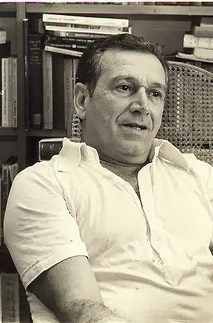
- Born: October 12, 1923; Belo Horizonte
- Died: October 11, 2004 (aged 80); Rio de Janeiro
- Writing career
- Language: Portuguese
- Genres: Novels; short stories

Fernando Tavares Sabino (October 12, 1923 – October 11, 2004) was a Brazilian writer and journalist.

== Life ==
Sabino was born in Belo Horizonte, Minas Gerais, the son of Dominic Sabino and D. Odette Tavares Sabino. He lived there until he was twenty, when he moved to Rio de Janeiro.

Sabino was the author of 50 books, as well as many short stories and essays. His first book was published in 1941, when he was just 18 years old. Sabino vaulted to national and international fame in 1956 with the novel A Time to Meet, the tale of three friends in the inland city of Belo Horizonte. The book was inspired by Sabino's life history.

Sabino also enjoyed commercial success with The Great Insane and The Naked Man, which were made into films.

Sabino considered friendship to be one of the most important things in life. His circle of friends included Hélio Pellegrino, Otto Lara Resende, Paulo Mendes Campos, Rubem Braga, Clarice Lispector, Vinicius de Moraes, Carlos Drummond de Andrade, Mário de Andrade, and Manuel Bandeira.

In the last ten years of his life, Sabino was distant from the media. Many of his close friends died before him. Two years before his death, Sabino was diagnosed with cancer. Following a prolonged illness, he died one day before his 81st birthday in his Rio de Janeiro home.

== Partial bibliography ==
- "The Soul of Music," "Tit for Tat," "The Girl from Ipanema," and "I'm All Ears"
- "Sexual Inhibitions," "Prescriptions for Curing Passions," and "The Birthday Cake"
- "The Art of Saying No," The Brazilians
- O Grande Mentecapto
- A Time to Meet
- The Naked Man
- "O Menino No Espelho"

== Filmography - Writer ==
- Crônica da Cidade Amada (1964) (story) (segment Iniciada a Peleja)
- Homem Nu, O (1968 and 1997) (screenplay) (story)

... a.k.a. The Naked Man (International: English title)

- Faca de Dois Gumes (1989) (book)

... a.k.a. Two Edged Knife (USA)

- Grande Mentecapto, O (1989) (novel)
