= LGBTQ literature in Argentina =

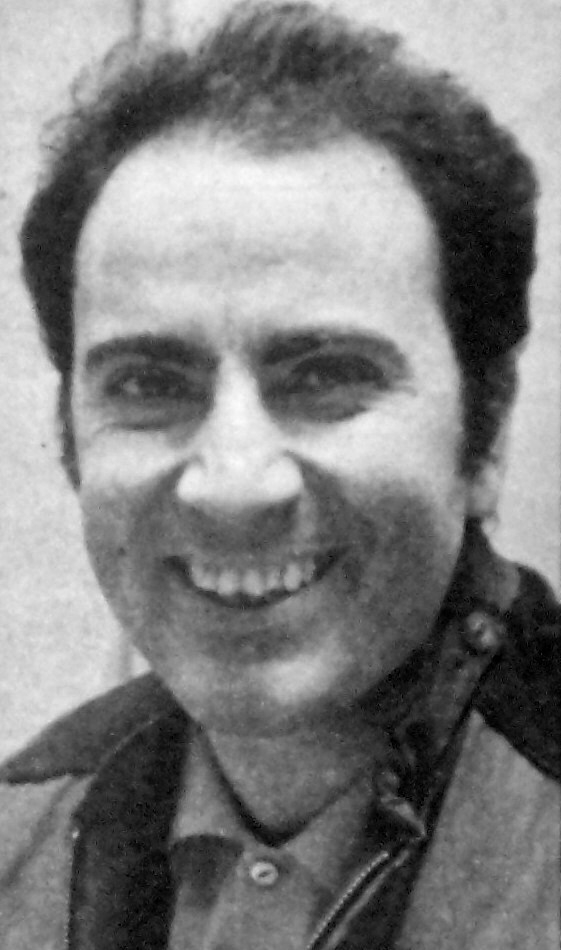
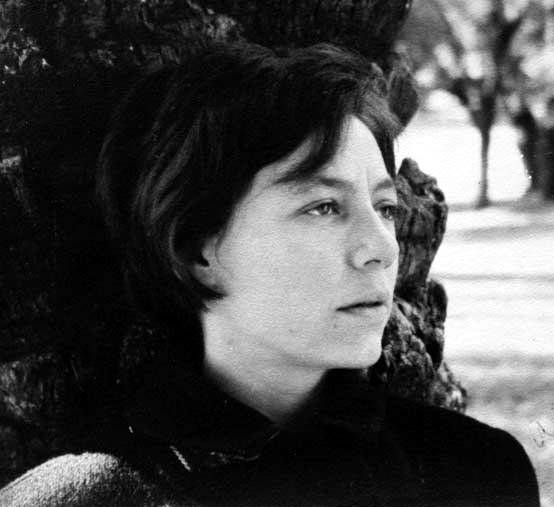
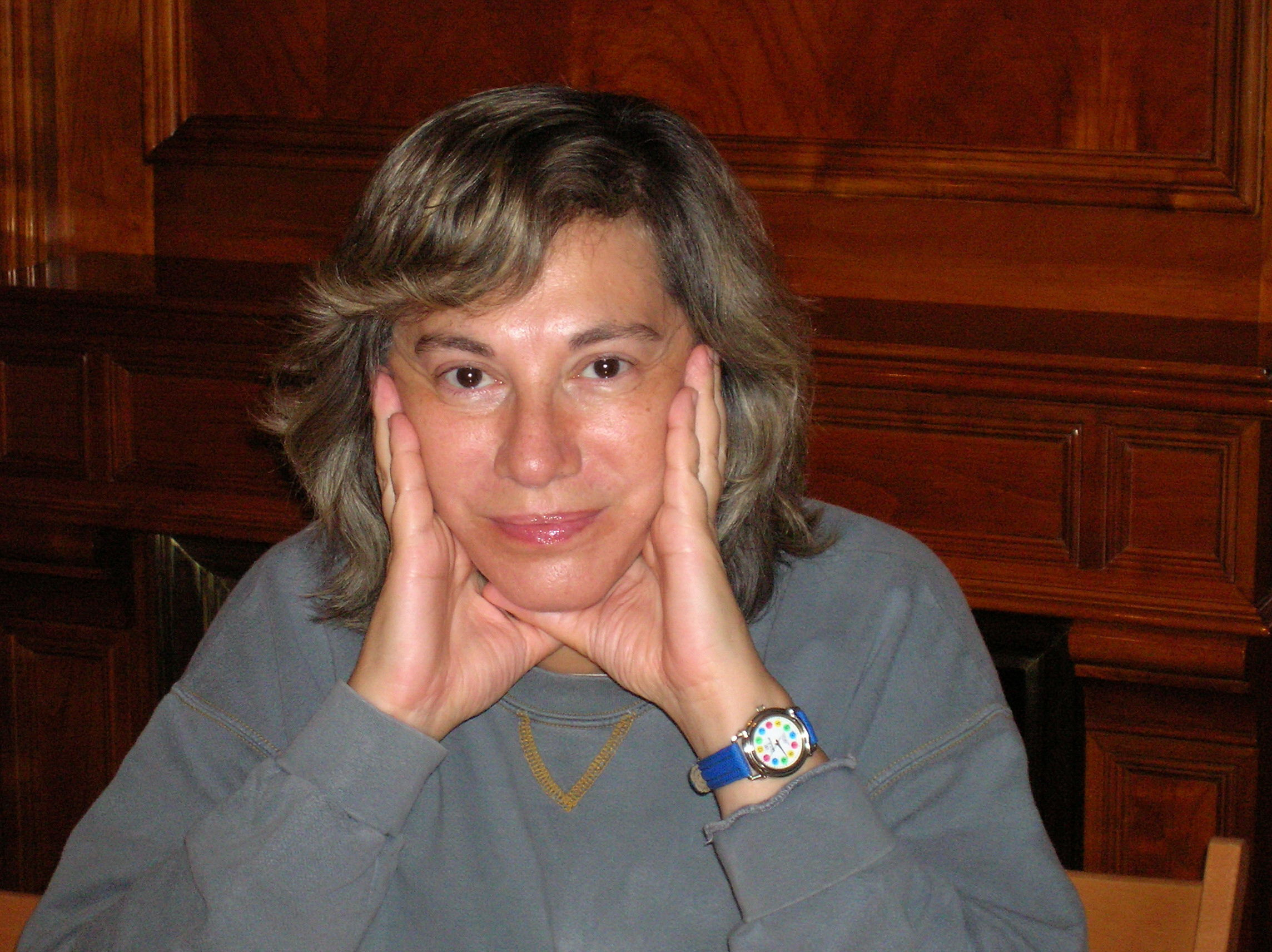
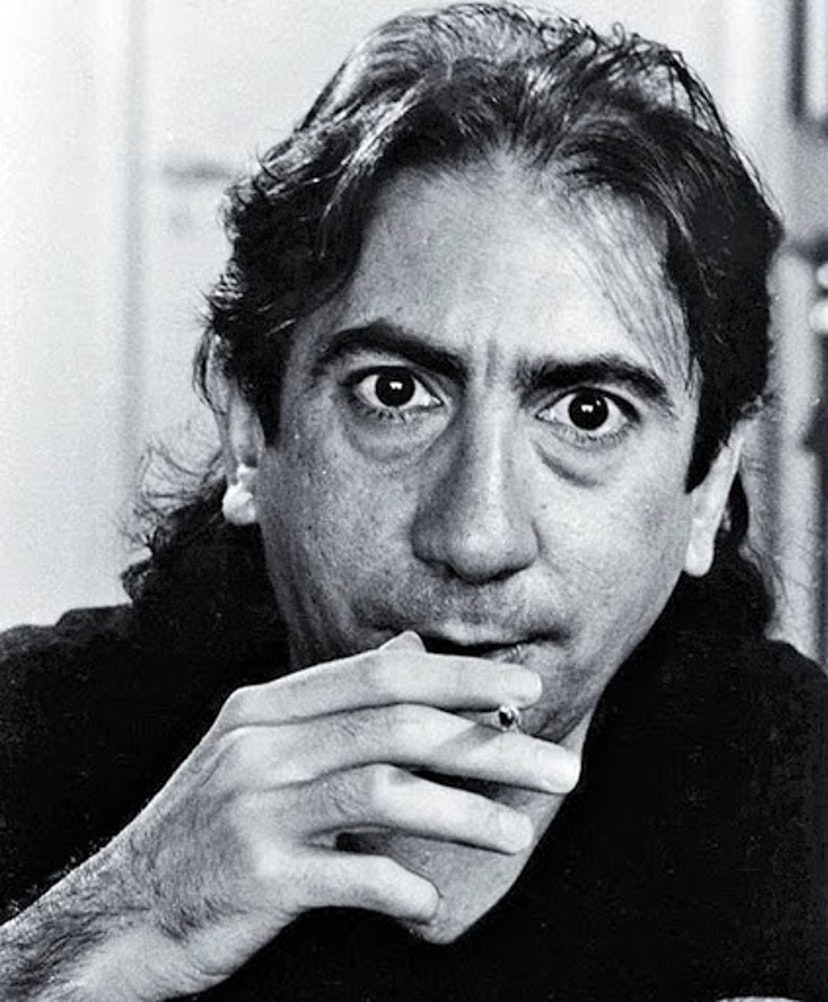
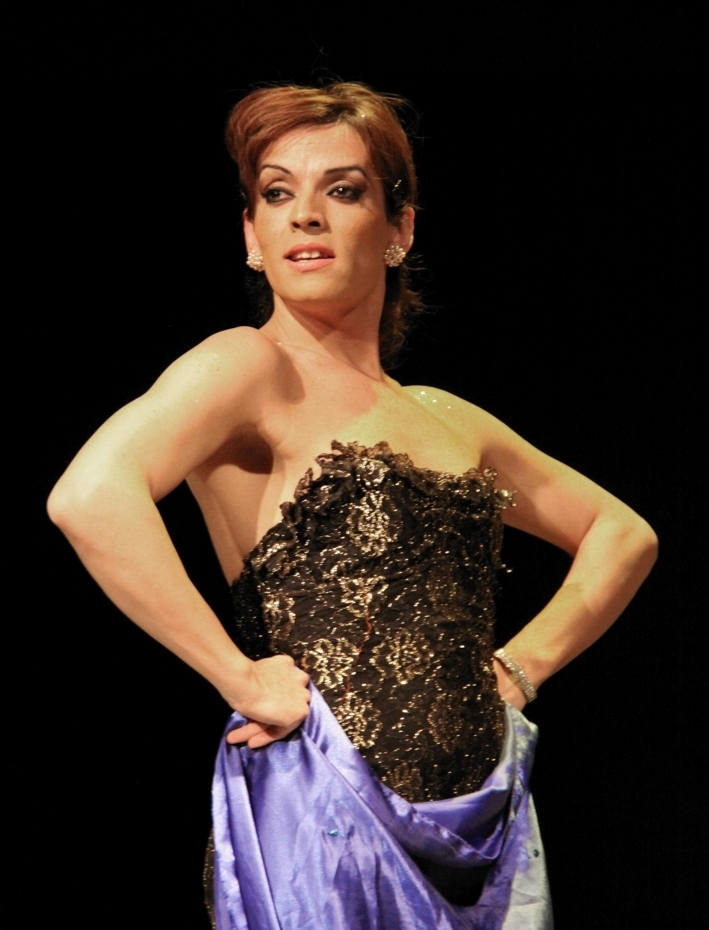
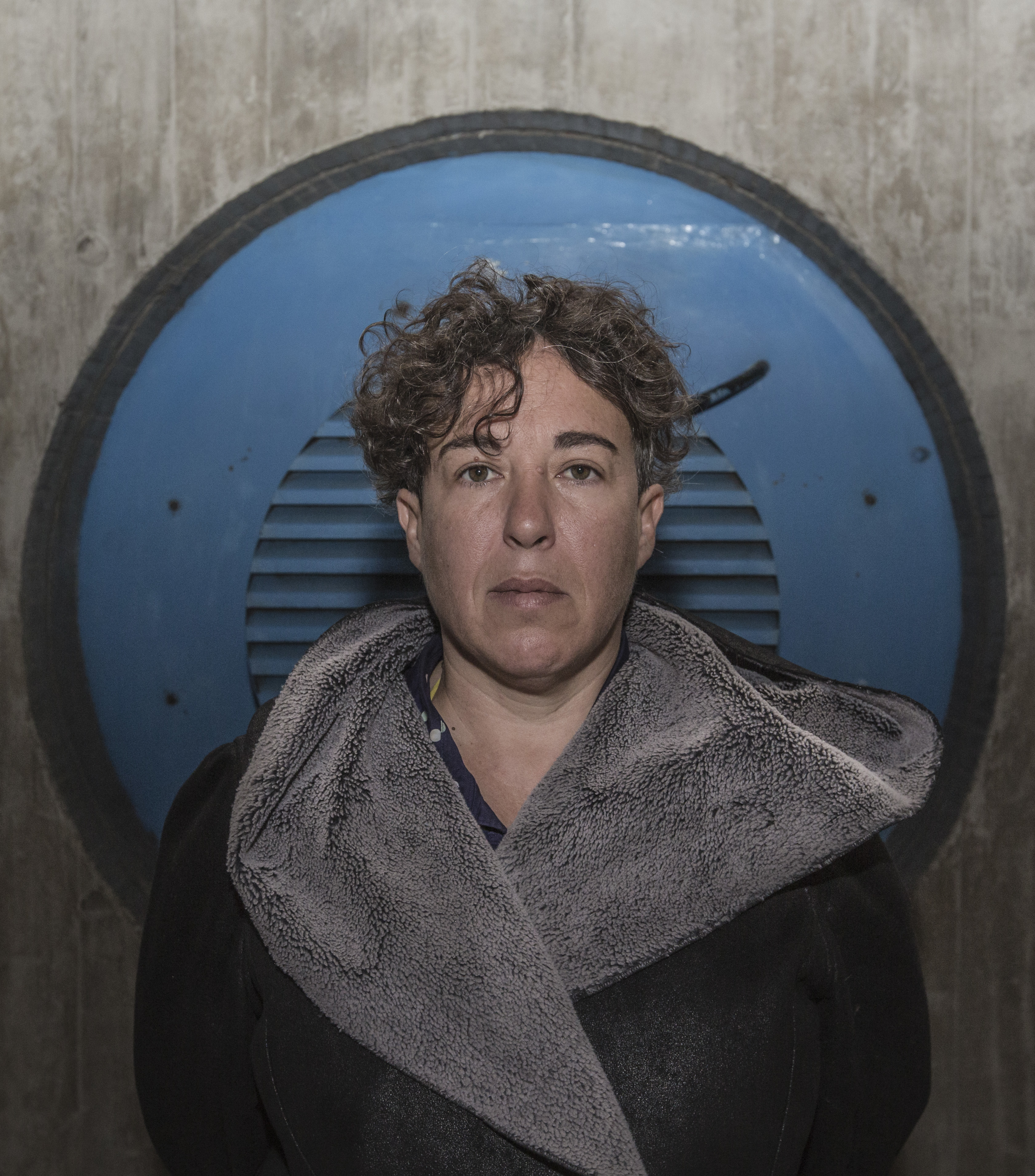
Some LGBT Argentine writers. From top left: Manuel Puig, Alejandra Pizarnik, Reina Roffé, Néstor Perlongher, Camila Sosa Villada and Gabriela Cabezón Cámara.

LGTV Literature in Argentina comprises Argentine authors using themes or characters that are gay, or are related to, sexual diversity. It forms part of a tradition dating back to the 19th century, although LGBT literature as its own category in the Argentine humanities did not occur until the end of the 1950s and beginning of the 1960s, on par with the birth of the LGBT rights movement in the country.

The first examples of LGBT relationships in Argentine literature had a negative connotation. These relationships illustrated the idea of the supposed social degradation in the working class and as an antagonistic paradigm of the platform that the country wanted to promote. The oldest is found in the story "The Slaughter Yard" (1838) by Esteban Echeverría, a classic of Argentine literature in which sex between men is used as a metaphor for barbarism. During the late 19th and early 20th centuries, examples of homosexual characters were negative, and many culminated in tragedy. Among these, a standout piece is the theatrical work Los invertidos ("The Inverts," 1914) by José González Castillo, which was banned after its debut due to its subject matter. Los invertidos follows a bourgeois man who has a secret homosexual lover and who decides to commit suicide when his wife finds out about his sexual orientation.

The 1959 story La narración de la historia ("The Narration of the Story") by Carlos Correas marked a paradigm shift, becoming the first Argentine literary work in which homosexuality is shown as a normal trait for the protagonist and not something harmful. However, its publication was controversial and there was a trial over its supposed immorality and pornographic content, in addition to a series of attacks on the author and the "homosexual/Marxist" conspiracy. Also in 1956, Silvina Ocampo published Carta perdida en un cajón ("Letter Lost in a Drawer"), the first of her stories to include lesbian references. A few years later, in 1964, Renato Pellegrini published the first LGBT novel in Argentina, Asfalto ("Asphalt"), which narrates the story of a young homosexual who discovers Buenos Aires' gay subculture and for which the author was sentenced to four months in jail for the crime of obscenity.

In the latter half of the 20th century, Argentine authors began to incorporate LGBT acts or characters with political subtext about Peronism or military dictatorships. Prominent in this was Manuel Puig, author of The Buenos Aires Affair (1973) and, in particular, Kiss of the Spider Woman (1976), one of the most well-known works in Spanish-language 20th century Latin American queer literature. In the novel, Puig follows the story of Valentín and Molina, a left-wing revolutionary and a homosexual cinema fan, respectively, while they share a cell during Argentina's period of state terrorism. Other works with LGBT characters or where violent homosexual acts are employed as a metaphor to tackle political topics are La invasión ("The Invasion," 1967) by Ricardo Piglia, La boca de la ballena ("The Mouth of the Whale," 1973) by Héctor Lastra, and El niño proletario ("The Proletarian Boy," 1973) by Osvaldo Lamborghini. Although it not related to politics, another of this era's notable figures was Alejandra Pizarnik who explored lesbian sexual violence in some of her works.

During the last Argentine dictatorship, some novels came to light that were considered foundational in the Argentine lesbian narrative: Monte de Venus ("Mount Venus," 1976) by Reina Roffé and En breve cárcel ("Soon Prison," 1981) by Sylvia Molloy. The first takes place in a school and narrates the story of a young lesbian who recounts her amorous adventures and wanderings through the city through recordings, while the second novel follows a woman who writes her story from a room in which she waits in vain for the woman she loves. Because of their themes, both novels were affected by censorship. Another historically important lesbian novel is Habitaciones ("Rooms") by Emma Barrandeguy, originally written in the 1950s but not published until 2002.

The 1990s saw the publication of various famous LGBT works such as El affair Skeffington ("The Skeffington Affair," 1992) by María Moreno, Plástico cruel ("Cruel Plastic," 1992) by José Sbarra, Plata quemada ("Burning Money," 1997) by Ricardo Piglia, and Un año sin amor ("A Year without Love," 1998) by Pablo Pérez, in which the author explores his experience living with HIV. In the 21st century, LGBT literature has gained greater visibility in Argentina due to commercial success from authors like Gabriela Cabezón Cámara, who began to explore sexual diversity in her novel La Virgen Cabeza ("Slum Virgin," 2009) and achieved international fame with Las aventuras de la China Iron ("The Adventures of China Iron," 2017); and Camila Sosa Villada, in particular with her novel Las Malas ("Bad Girls," 2019).

== 19th Century ==
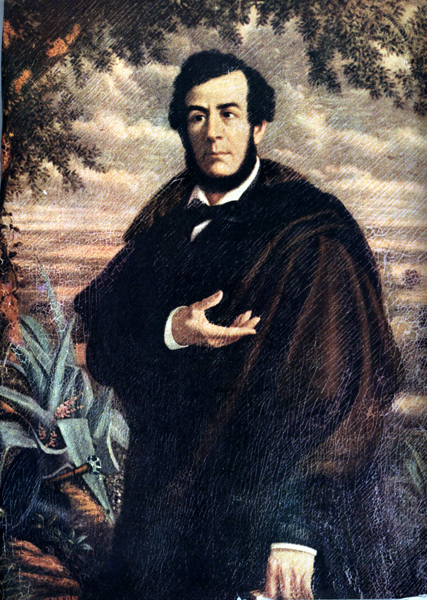
Portrait of Esteban Echeverría, author of "The Slaughter Yard" (1838)

Some of the foundational texts of Argentine literature drew a comparison between the values considered civilized and behaviors that the authors thought to be negative for society, such as "abnormal sex." "The Slaughter Yard" (1838) was written in this context. It was the first work of Argentine literature to reference a homosexual act. In the story, Esteban Echeverría criticizes Juan Manual de Rosas' authoritarian government to show the Federalist Party as men immersed in barbarism and violence who, in the story's climax, capture an attractive young member of the Unitarian Party. They tie him up and prepare to rape him under orders. However, the young Unitarian opts to slit his own throat rather than permit the transgression of masculinity that being raped would mean, a sacrifice Echeverría uses to represent his conception of courage and honor.

The idea of using male rape as a form of torture between the Unitarians and the Federalists was not limited to "The Slaughter Yard". In his poem La refalosa, Hilario Ascasubi describes a similar situation:

Unitarian that we catch

We just stretch him;
or standing,
from behind
the fellows claw him,
of course, Mazorqueros
and he is whipped with a doubled hobble
Situated elbow to elbow
And naked above all
Savage!

Here begins his affliction

Note: Mazorqueros were members of the Mazorca, a vigilante group in 19th century Argentina.

Another foundational work that references sexual diversity is La novia de hereje o La inquisición de Lima ("The heretic's girlfriend, or the Lima inquisition," 1846), a novel by Vicente Fidel López that tells the story of a romantic relationship between a man and a woman in colonial Lima. In the book, the author describes the world of maricones (an offensive word for "homosexual"), men described as effeminate and coquettish who work as assistants to high-society women. Although López refers to them in a negative way (he affirms that seeing them produces "moral disgust" and that their body language is "repellent"), the text is known for its role as a historical account of the lives homosexuals lived in Lima during this era and the acceptance they enjoyed in certain social sectors. One of the parties that the maricones participate in is described with the following:

There was an individual who used to sing with them too and who, thanks to an accident of masculinity, would meet the very special circumstances of the feminine sex. He was a half-indefinable term between woman, boy, and man, impossible to characterize properly. The most surprising thing in that meeting was that there were another fifteen or twenty individuals of this same type who seemed to play the role of women, or an extension of women at least; being probably that this would have given leeway to what might be said to be called maricones, as those of this type were, already known in Lima.

=== Gaucho literature and naturalism ===
While there are no explicit references to sexual or romantic acts between people of the same sex, academics like Gustavo Geirola and Adrián Melo have identified homoerotic elements in the friendships between protagonists in classic works of Gaucho literature, like Martín Fierro (1872) by José Hernández, and Juan Moreira (1879) by Eduardo Gutiérrez. In both cases, the protagonists abandon their wives and find men with whom they develop an intense friendship and who become the only recipients of their affection; Cruz in the case of Martín Fierro and Julián in Jaun Moreira. The way in which Gutiérrez describes the relationship between Julián and Moreira has a notably romantic tone, as in the scene in which they meet and Gutiérrez describes, stating his "looks fused them together, in a manner of speaking, and they both smiled," in an encounter between both men in which, after embracing, "their two souls in one perhaps blended," or when telling how Moreira could recognize the arrival of his friend's horse because "his heart told him it was Julián." Martín Fierro's reaction to the death of Cruz, for his part, is described in similar terms to that of Achilles to Patroclus' death, of that of David's elegy for Jonathan's death.

The last decades of the 19th century saw the appearance of a wave a novels in literary naturalism that positioned the idea that depravity and criminality were intrinsically linked to lower social classes and foreigners who arrived during the Great European immigration wave to Argentina. One of the authors most focused on this theme was Eugenio Cambaceres, among whose notable works is the novel En la sangre ("In the blood," 1887), which tells of the life of a boy named Genaro, the son of immigrants, and makes use of homosexual acts to exemplify the protagonist's supposed corruption. Specifically, Cambaceres describes the leader of a group of Genaro's male friends as "cynical and as depraved as an old man" and indicates that they would typically play "men and women," a game in which the bigger boys played the role of men and the smaller boys played the women, and they rolled around two by two on the floor while "trying to imitate their parents' example." Another naturalist novel in which homosexuality is used to draw a negative portrait of a character is La bolsa ("The Purse," 1891) by Julián Martel, a work in which the face of a Jewish immigrant is described as "disagreeable and effeminate," and it is later suggested that he had a romantic relationship with a younger Jewish boy.

== 20th century ==
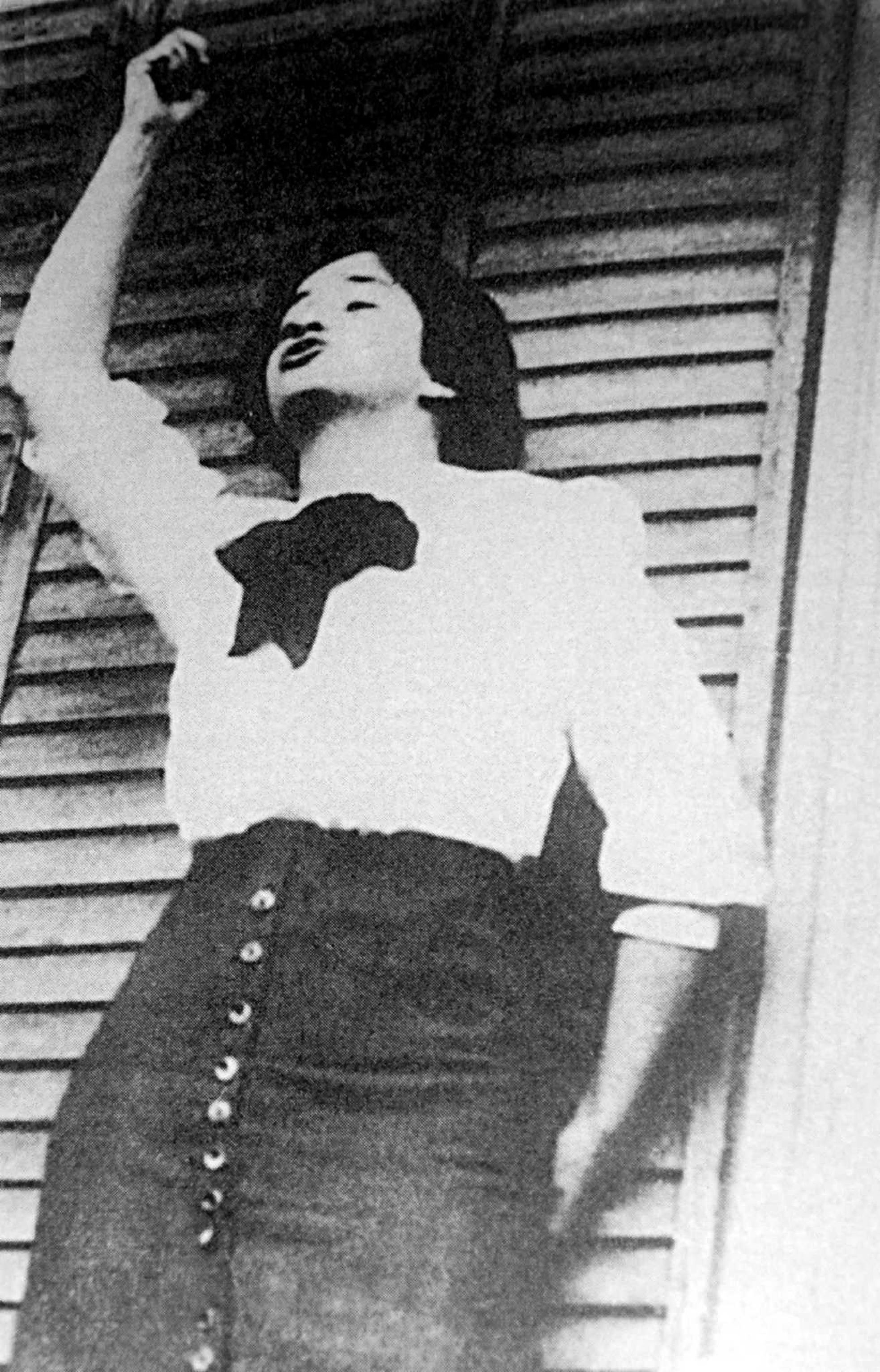
Salvadora Medina in 1915

With the arrival of the 20th century, one of the first representations of lesbian love emerged in Argentine literature, the story Marta y Hortensia ("Marta and Hortense"), authored by Enrique Gómez Carrillo, a naturalized Argentine citizen originally from Guatemala, published in his book Almas y cerebros: historias sentimentales, intimidades parisienses, etc ("Souls and minds: sentimental histories, Parisian intimacies, etc." 1900). The story, whose plot references the novel La Fille aux yeux d'or (1835) by Honoré de Balzac, follows the tale of a man who discovers that his wife and his sister have begun a secret romance. Although this fills him with rage, he ultimately decides not to confront them.

A few years later, the last major work of Argentine naturalism was published, the theatrical work Los invertidos ("The Inverts," 1914). written by José González Castillo. In the play, diverse sexualities appear as symbols of social corruption, however, in contrast to the novels at the end of the 19th century, homosexuality has become a symbol of perversion in the bourgeois classes, rather than the working class. The plot of the work, which begins with a reading of a clinical case about the murder of a man at the hands of his lover, a "sexual invert," tells the story of Doctor Flórez, an upper-class man with children, married to a woman named Clara, and who has a secret life and romance with a man of the last name Pérez. When Clara goes to Pérez's apartment, a place where the "brotherhood" of homosexuals meets, she discovers her spouse's sexual orientation and, later on, sees him kissing Pérez, at which point she kills him. Later, she gives a weapon to Flórez for him to kill himself so that he can "cleanse the blood of her descendents," which he does.

Given its theme, Los invertidos was a controversial work and was banned by the superintendent of police for "unsettling morals and proper customs." Despite this, the end of the work adapted to the tendency of the era to present tragic endings for homosexual characters as a form of punishment. The piece is considered a precursor to Argentine LGBT theater, such as local transvestism, and it continued to be produced in theaters in the following decades. With respect to the controversy that its debut caused, González Castillo asserted in a deposition that his intention was "to inspire revulsion for those sad individuals." This negative attitude can be seen in the work, in which the author affirmed, in reference to homosexuals, through Flórez's statement:

In general, they’re normal—even vigorous, masculine, young (...)—individuals, individuals gifted with all the virile qualities of the common man, but in whom, precisely, the physical or moral masculine superiority of a fellow man exerts a powerful attraction … And when they are under the action of the moment that we call critical, at night especially, they become women, less than women, with all their peculiarities, with all their cravings, and their passions, as if in this moment their nature was going through a marvelous and monstrous transformation … It is the voice of the ancestors, the cry of vice, the imperious call of genetic vice, inherited in a decrepit and work out organism in its own origin by the work of a past of material and emotional lies!

During the following years, it continued to be common for homosexual characters in Argentine literature to meet violent ends, many times through suicide, or for them to not be able to express their desires. In his novel Mad Toy (1926), Roberto Arlt includes the character of Tristán, described as a marica (an offensive word for a gay man) with a "lying smile," "feminine stockings," and a thin physique who "gets like that" through the influence of a professor who dressed like a woman and had committed suicide some time before. Tristán, who, when it comes to sexual relations, is a bottom, rejects his masculinity and dreams of being a woman, "Why couldn't I have been born a woman instead of being a degenerate …? (...) if I could, I'd give all my money to be a woman." Another example occurs in some of the works of Manuel Mujica Lainez, in particular in a story from the book Aquí vivieron ("Here They Lived"). There is Historia de una quinta de San Isidro (1583–1924) ("History of a San Isidro Villa (1583–1924)," 1949), in which a boy is in love with his cousin and together they discover a treasure, but later he fights his cousin to the death when he finds out that he was seeing a girl. In the novel The Wandering Unicorn (1965), a fairy who is in love with a man from the 12th century named Aiol asks her mother for a body so she can be with her love, but she receives a male body, and so has to quiet her passion for her beloved.

Unlike masculine LGBT characters, the lesbian representation from the era did not end with the death of its characters. An early example es the story El quinto ("The Fifth"), included in the book La Casa de Enfrente ("The House Opposite," 1926) by bisexual writer Salvadora Medina Onrubia, in which the author describes in detail the sensual desire that he protagonist feels for another woman, although she never dares to confess it. One can also mention the novel El derecho de matar ("The Right to Kill," 1933) by Raúl Barón Biza, whose plot relies on a climax similar to that of the story Marta y Hortensia (1900), in which the protagonist discovers a secret romantic relationship between his wife and his sister and, although he at first considers murdering them, he ultimately opts to commit suicide.

Another notable figure from this era is Witold Gombrowicz, a Polish writer who lived in Argentina and is considered a pioneer in LGBT literature in the country, mainly for his Diarios, ("Journals"), which use erotic language to describe the working-class young men he encounters on his walks through Buenos Aires, and for his autobiographical novel Trans-Atlantyk (1953), which follows the "Whore" Gonzalo, and includes detailed descriptions of his plans to find young men to seduce and have sex with, many times offering them money.

=== Paradigm shift: 1959–1964 ===
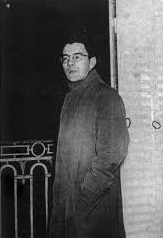
Carlos Correas in 1959

The paradigm shift regarding how homosexuality was represented in literature began in 1959 with the publication of the story La narración de la historia ("The Narration of the Story") by Carlos Correas, the first Argentine work in which homosexuality was shown as something natural and not something pernicious. In the story, a young homosexual university student named Ernesto has a sexual encounter with a young working-class man who he meets at the Constitución train station. While at first he plans to return to meet him, he eventually stands the man up and decides to return to the security of his social class and have sexual relations with a bourgeois young man similar to himself. The story's publication caused a scandal and led to attacks against Correas for alleged "homosexual/Marxist conspiracy" and a trial against him for immorality and pornography, with a suspended sentence of six months in jail.

Also in 1959, the writer Silvina Ocampo published the story Carta perdida en un cajón ("Letter Lost in a Drawer"), as part of the book La furia ("The Fury"), which narrates the protagonist's passion for a woman named Alba Cristián. The beginning of the story is famous for avoiding pronouns and grammatical endings that would allow the reader to determine the gender of the person the protagonist loves. Her passion is described using intense terms, as can be appreciated in the following excerpt:

To reflect from night to morning on your eyes, on your hair, on your mouth, on your voice, on this way you have of walking, it renders me incapacitated for any job. Sometimes, on hearing you utter my name, my heart skips a beat (...) One day, in our friends' house, on seeing you, a trembling cloud enveloped the back of my neck, my body was covered in shivers (...), I felt dizzy, nauseous …

Another milestone in Argentine LGBT literature took place in 1964 with the publication of Renato Pellegrini's work Asfalto, which is considered Argentina's first LGBT novel. The plot of this work follows the first-person account of Eduardo Ales, a young, 17-year-old homosexual who moves to Buenos Aires after being expelled from school and who, little by little, discovers the city's gay subculture. Because of the novel's themes, Pellegrini was condemned to four months in prison for the crime of obscenity during the dictatorship of Juan Carlos Onganía. Some academics, including Adrán Melo, consider Siranger (1957)—another of Pellegrini's works—to be the first Argentine LGBT novel instead of Asfalto. However, in the case of Siranger, the protagonist, a youth named Gerado Leni who also moves to Buenos Aires, reacts with shame and guilt over his homoerotic desires and the work culminates in a tragic double suicide, while Asfalto was the first novel in which the protagonist's homosexuality is not treated with open feelings of shame.

=== Homosexuality in political works: 1960–1976 ===
The political situation in the 1960s and 1970s in relation to Peronism and the military dictatorships can be seen reflected in the era's various literary works. Some of them, as with "The Slaughter Yard" (1838) in its time, used the image of rape as a symbol for brutality and the perception of conflict between social classes. One example takes place in the novel The Winners (1960) by Julio Cortázar, in which a young man who is compared to Adonis is raped by a foreign sailor with a tattoo of an eagle, in an apparent reference to Ganymede Abducted by the Eagle. In La boca de la ballena ("The Mouth of the Whale," 1973) by Héctor Lastra, a young man from the upper classes falls in love with a young working-class man named Pedro during the final years of the second Perón administration. After the coup d'etat deposed the president, Pedro dies in a fire, so the protagonist allows himself to be raped by a homeless man because he is overcome by the impossibility of being able to bridge the gap of their respective social classes.

Another instance of rape occurs in the story El niño proletario ("The proletarian boy," 1973) by Osvaldo Lamborghini. In this story, a working-class boy is brutally raped and tortured by three bourgeois boys, a metaphor for the exploitation of the working classes at the hands of economic elites.

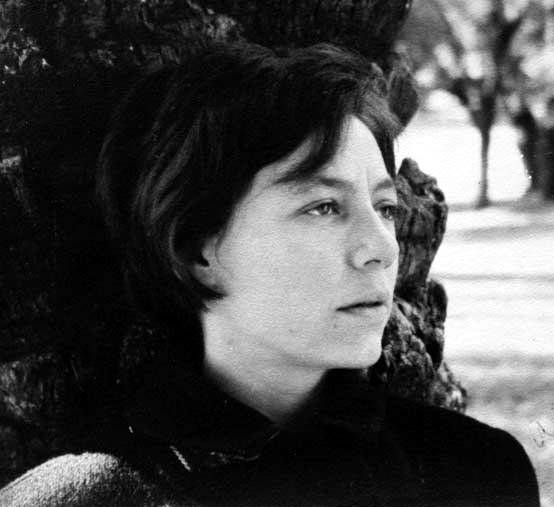
Alejandra Pizarnik in 1967

Although her writing is not normally classified as political, the bisexual poet Alejandra Pizarnik explored sexual violence in the context of relationships between women in several of her works published during this period, as happens in Violario (1965; the story's title is a portmanteau of velorio, "wake" and violador, "rapist"), a story that recounts an occasion in which a woman attempts to rape another woman during a wake. Among Pizarnik's better-known works is La condesa sangrienta ("The Bloody Countess," 1966), a text that mixes poetry, prose, and literary criticism to explicitly narrate the tale of the torture and sexual abuse committed by the Hungarian countess Erzsébet Báthory against the young women she captured.

Returning to the political realm, the presence of peronism in LGBT literature can be established in works by authors like Ricardo Piglia, in particular in his story La invasión ("The Invasion," 1967), which plays out in a barracks (a metaphor for Argentina in this era), in which a portly man named Celaya, a symbol of Perón, is accompanied by a morochito (a small, dark-skinned man, also called "morocho" in the following excerpt), representing the common people, who does everything Celaya asks of him. At night, the story's protagonist, a conscripted soldier named Renzi who appears in other Piglia works, describes in horror the realization that the marochito's submission to Celaya also includes submission of a sexual nature:

The morocho had removed his clothes(...) Next to Celaya—tall, solid—the morocho seemed diluted, pale(...) Renzi came to understand after a while that the morocho was caressing Celaya’s neck. His hands slid across his neck, climbed to the base of his ears, descended along the chest and began to remove his pants. From the floor, Renzi saw the morocho’s chin, hips lips paying with Celaya’s nipples, his neck, his mouth; the two bodies embraced, thrown onto the mattress as if they were fighting; the morocho’s body is an arch, Celaya curved around him, their groans and their voices could be made out, the two bodies swinging in a hammock and their moans and the break in Celaya’s voice mixed into one violent pant.

Peronism also plays a tragic role in Sergio (1976), the first explicitly LGBT novel by Manuel Mujica Lainez, in which the protagonist, who starts a love triangle with two siblings (a sister and brother), is killed along with his lover during the arrival of a popular political leader who the reader assumes to be Perón. Moral norms during the Argentine dictatorship, on the other hand, were addressed in novels like Ay de mí, Jonathan (1976) by Carlos Arcidiácono, which explores the life of the protagonist—a 46-year-old homosexual man—and his time in Buenos Aires' gay subculture. It includes memories of his romantic disappointments and waiting for a meeting with a young man named Miguel who leaves him enamored.

The figure of Eva Perón also fascinated gay authors, including Copi and Néstor Osvaldo Perlongher, who wrote works like the play Eva Perón (1970) and the story Evita vive ("Evita Lives," 1975), respectively, which take on political topics in detail. Additionally, Copi explored masculine homosexuality in several of his novels, including El baile de las locas ("The Crazy Women's Dance," 1977) and La guerra de las mariconas ("The War of the Queers," 1982), both written in French; while in exile, Perlongher wrote poems and essays that described his sexual experiences in detail.

=== Emergence of Manuel Puig ===
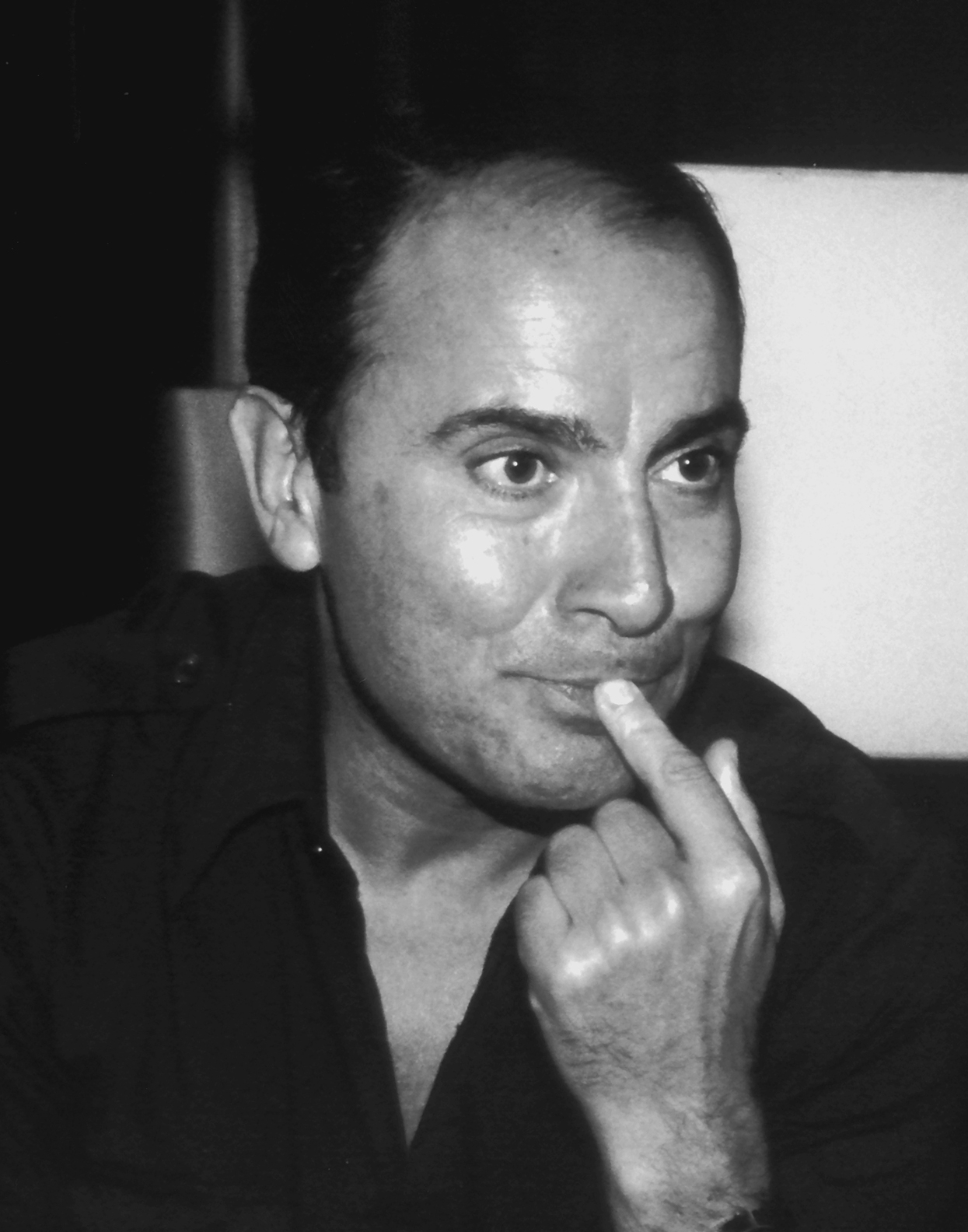
Manuel Puig in 1979

At the end of the 1960s, Manuel Puig began his literary career. He is considered one of the greatest Latin American writers of his time. He spoke openly about his attraction to people of the same sex. In his first novel, Betrayed by Rita Hayworth (1968), Puig includes autobiographical details to tell the story of Toto, a boy who grows up in a town in the Pampas and feels "different" from his peers, who soon start bullying him with accusations of homosexuality. Even more explicitly in this theme was The Buenos Aires affair (1973), in which one of the protagonists, a man with anger issues and repressed desires named Leopoldo Druscóvich, kills a man after raping him in an empty field. An important theme in the novel is the construction of masculinity during Leopold's formative years, which also serves as a metaphor for the violence of the era. Because it included "obscene" scenes and because of political repression, the work was censored and Puig was placed on the government's black list.

In 1976, Puig published the novel Kiss of the Spider Woman, which is considered one of the best-known Latin American LGBT works in Spanish from the 20th century. The work takes place in 1975 and follows the story of two men who share a prison cell in Buenos Aires: Valentín, a left-wing revolutionary, and Molina, a homosexual man and fan of classic Hollywood movies. The character of Molina signifies a breaking point in regards to literary representation of "sissies" who, while considered soft and an object of scorn, becomes the heroine of the story. The plot is developed through dialogues between the two characters, who strike up a friendship that later leads to a romance. From a symbolic point of view, the prison in which The Kiss of the Spider Woman takes place represents Argentina under state terrorism, while Valentín and Molina represent the relationship between the left and homosexuality and their need to learn to coexist.

=== First lesbian novels: 1976–1981 ===
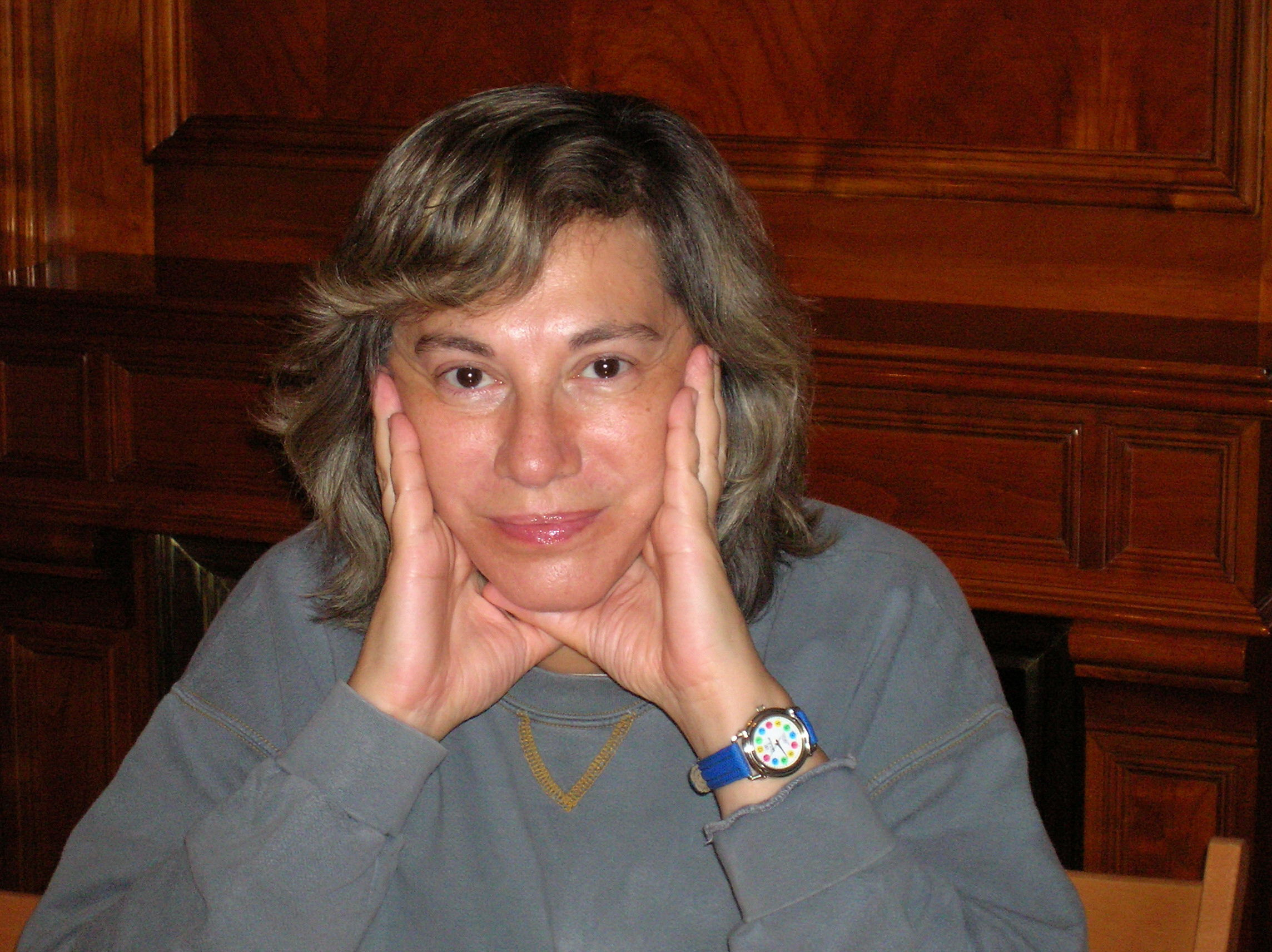
Reina Roffé, author of the novel Monte de Venus (1976)

The establishment of the last Argentine military dictatorship, which lasted from 1976 to 1983, was characterized by the censorship of books that did not have a "western and christian" message, which resulted in many works with LGBT themes being banned. Coincidentally, during this period, two novels considered foundational to the lesbian narrative in Argentina appeared: Monte de Venus ("Mount Venus," 1976) by Reina Roffé and En breve cárcel ("Soon Prison," 1981) by Sylvia Molloy. Both were affected by the military regime's censorship.

Monte de Venus is a bildungsroman that takes place in a night school and follows the story of Julia Grane, a young lesbian, described as being masculine, who recounts her amorous adventures and travels throughout the city through recordings. These recordings begin on the request of her literature professor whom she loves and who has promised to let Julia write a book about her story. However, Julia is subsequently betrayed by her professor who, at the end of the novel, decides to write her own story. In a way that parallels the recordings, the novel intersperses chapters that reconstruct the life of other female students and women in Buenos Aires at the time, including political aspects. Because of its subject matter, the work was censored just days after its publication.

Even though En breve cárcel (1981) by Sylvia Molloy was published five years after Monte de Venus, it is usually considered the pioneering Argentine novel in lesbian literature because Roffé's novel suffered from such swift censorship that it languished in obscurity for many years. En breve cárcel was published in Spain after Argentine publishers rejected it because of the threat of censorship. The plot follows a woman who writes her story from a room in which she waits in vain for Renata, the woman she loves, to arrive. Later on, the protagonist recounts the love triangle between her, Renata, and both women's former lover, Vera. When the novel was published, various local profiles avoided speaking directly about its homosexual themes, which included indirect references to Sappho and Lawrence Durrell.

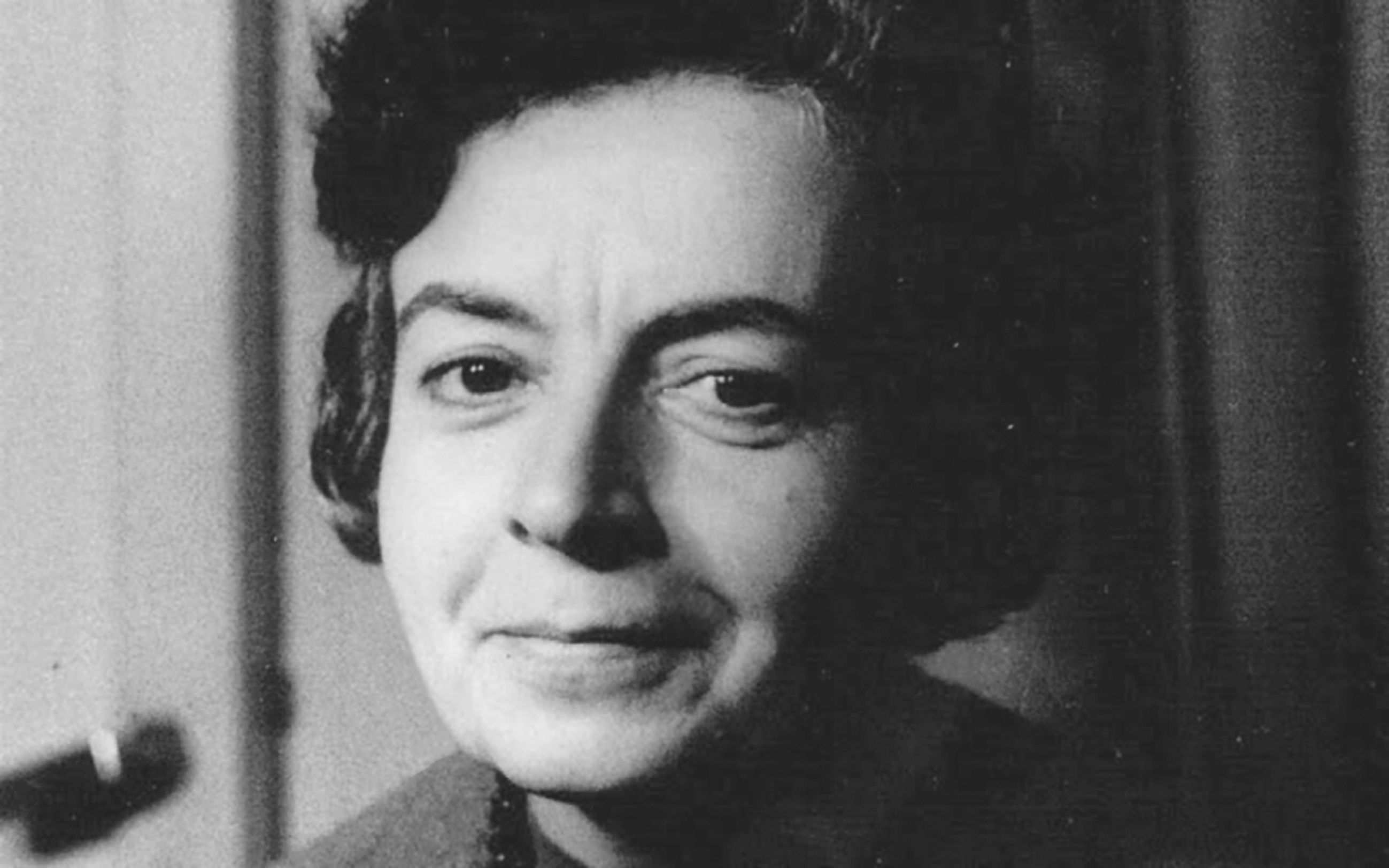
Emma Barrandeguy in 1980

Another important historical lesbian work is the novel Habitaciones ("Rooms") by Emma Barrandeguy. Although it was published in the 21st century, it was originally written in the late 1950s. The work is composed of a series of reflections that blend narrative and autobiography and tell the story of E., a married woman who has affairs with men and women. Of particular importance for Barrandéguy in the work is the relationship between public and private space, as can be seen in the following excerpt:

We talked. And I wanted to approach and kiss her, partly to show affection and a little because I simply wanted to make a scene of love, challenging people in the cinemas and the streets. The cars went down the nearby street and, if possible, it would have been nice to be able to hear the indignant comments of people passing by.

=== Final years of the 20th century ===
The last decades of the 20th century, coinciding with the process of recovering democracy in Argentina, saw the appearance of LGBT works that dealt with eroticism and sexual pleasure more openly than their predecessors like La brasa en la mano ("A Hot Coal in the Hand") by Oscar Hermes Villodor, published in 1983, although it was written decades earlier. The story follows a 20-year-old man (the author's alter ego) and describes the spaces frequented by LGBT people of the time through which he finds sailors, soldiers, chauffeurs, and prostitutes to have sexual encounters with. Another example is the novel Lo impenetrable ("The Impenetrable," 1984) by Griselda Gambaro, originally created for a Spanish contest in erotic literature. It tells how the protagonist, Madam X, a woman who, throughout the work, explores her sexual desires and has encounters with men as much as women, sometimes with more than one person at a time. Outside of the Argentine context, Lo impenetrable is situated with a series of works by feminist authors who, after the dictatorship, began to publish works that defied traditional ideas about sexuality and female desire. Among these works is Canon de alcoba ("Bedroom Norms," 1988) by Tununa Mercado, which includes stories with lesbian themes like El recogimiento ("The Seclusion") and Oír ("To Hear").

Some works from the 1980s can also be included in this category, including Los intrusos ("The Intruders," 1989) by Martha Mercader, which offers an important queer retelling of the 1970 story La intrusa ("The Female Intruder") by Jorge Luis Borges. In the Borges story, two brothers obsess over a woman named Juliana and ultimately kill her to restore their relationship. Some academics have interpreted the protagonists from Borges' story as two men who utilize Juliana as a way to express their homosexual attraction amongst themselves. Mercader's story makes this attraction explicit and ends the story with the two men accepting their feelings for each other. Other Borges stories that have received homoerotic treatments include El encuentro ("The Encounter"), El duelo ("The Duel"), and El otro duelo ("The Other Duel"). Silviana Ocampo, for her part, has also published some works that are considered homoerotic, although in her case, they are about women: Memorias secretas de una muñeca ("A Doll's Secret Memories," 1987) and El piano incendiado ("The Piano Aflame," 1988).

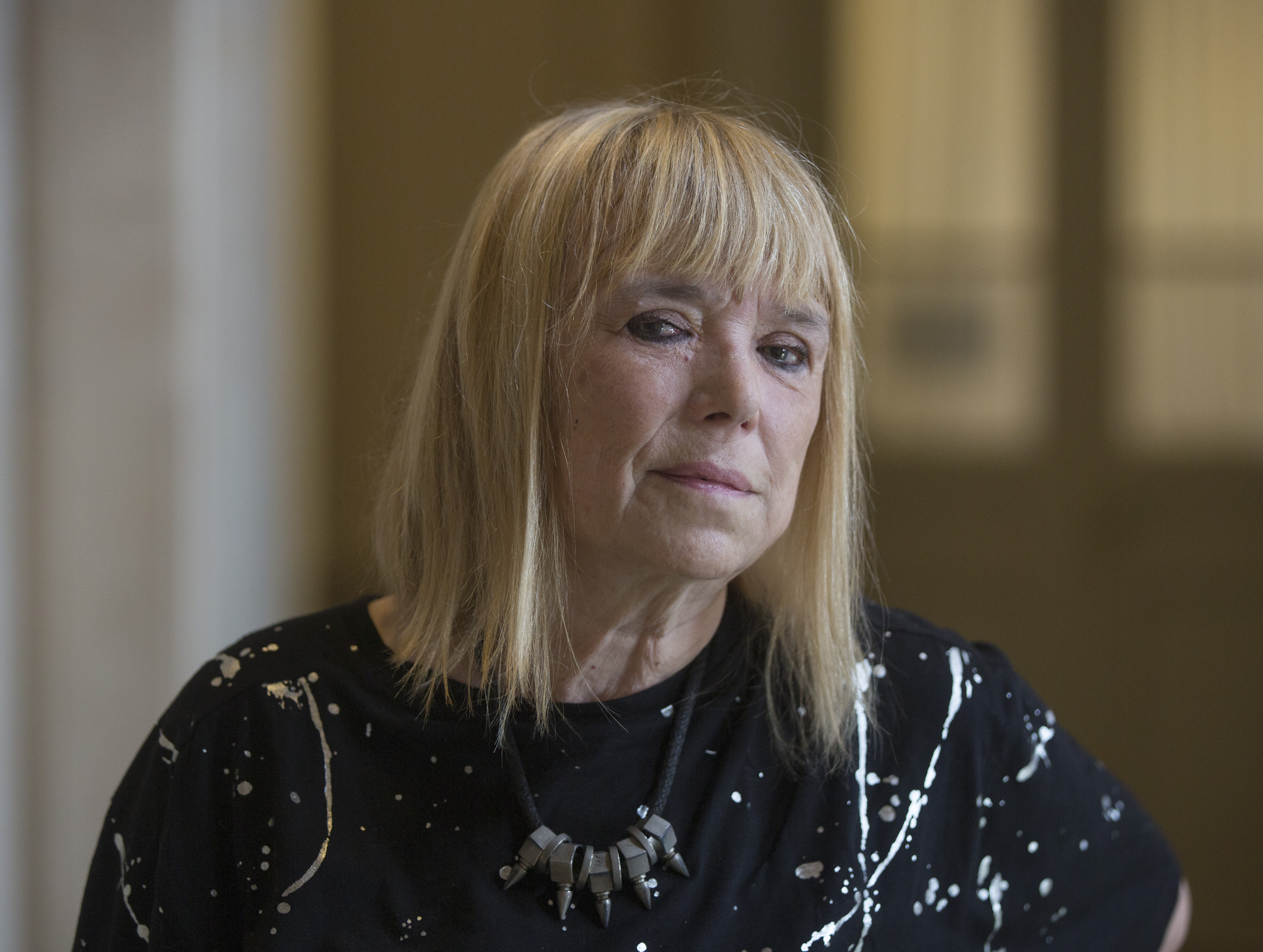
María Moreno in 2020

One of the principle figures representing the growing influence of feminism on the era's literature is María Moreno who, between 1988 and 1991, wrote the column La mujer pública ("The Public Woman") for the magazine Babel. In 1992, Moreno published her first novel, El affair Skeffington ("The Skeffington Affair"), in which she reconstructs the life of a fictional author from the United States named Dolly Skeffington through a manuscript Moreno found that included a philosophical diary and a collection of poems, both supposedly written by Skeffington. Through these texts, which move through a variety of literary genres. Moreno reconstructs the writer's life and her journey to Paris, where she finds a bohemian city where she can openly express her sexuality without the restrictions found in her country of origin.

Other than El affair Skeffington, other notable novels from the 1990s include:

- Plástico cruel ("Cruel Plastic," 1992) by José Sbarra, which narrates the infatuation between a transvestite poet named Bombón through a boy from the countryside named Axel, whom she meets in a public bathroom.
- The autobiographical novel Un año sin amor ("A Year without Love," 1998) by Pablo Pérez, written in the form of a diary, which explores his experience living with HIV in a time when getting HIV was a death sentence, and which was continued in El mendigo chupapijas ("The Cocksucking Beggar"), a sequel published in installments.
- Nuestra señora de la noche ("Our Lady of the Night," 1997) by Marco Denevi, whose title references the 1943 novel Our Lady of the Flowers by French author Jean Genet, takes place in a bar where people of diverse sexual orientations and who love others without qualms congregate.
- Nombre de guerra ("Nom de Guerre," 1999) by Claudio Zeiger, which tells the story of a young prostitute named Andres and his adventures with his friend Pablo.

According to the academic Adrián Melo, the last Argentine novel of the 20th century to use a story with LGBT characters to explore political themes was Plata quemada ("Burning Money") by Ricardo Piglia, published in 1997. The work, inspired by a real crime that happened in 1965, follows the story of Baby Brigone and Gaucho Dorda, a couple of gay criminals who rob a bank and, on finding themselves cornered by the police, burn all the money they stole. As Melo asserts, Piglia utilized the plot's climax to critique the era's Argentine politicians, and burning the money came to represent a direct refusal of neoliberal ideals. The criminals end up paying for this stunt with their lives:

Dorda finally arrived next to Baby and pulled him towards the wall, for cover, and lifted him against his body, stretching around him, embraced, semi-naked. They looked at each other; Baby was dying. Gaucho wiped his face and tried not to cry(...) And after Baby raised himself a little, supporting himself on his elbow and said something into his ear that no one could hear—a statement of love, surely, half said or unsaid, perhaps but felt by Gaucho who kissed him while Baby passed away.

== 21st century ==
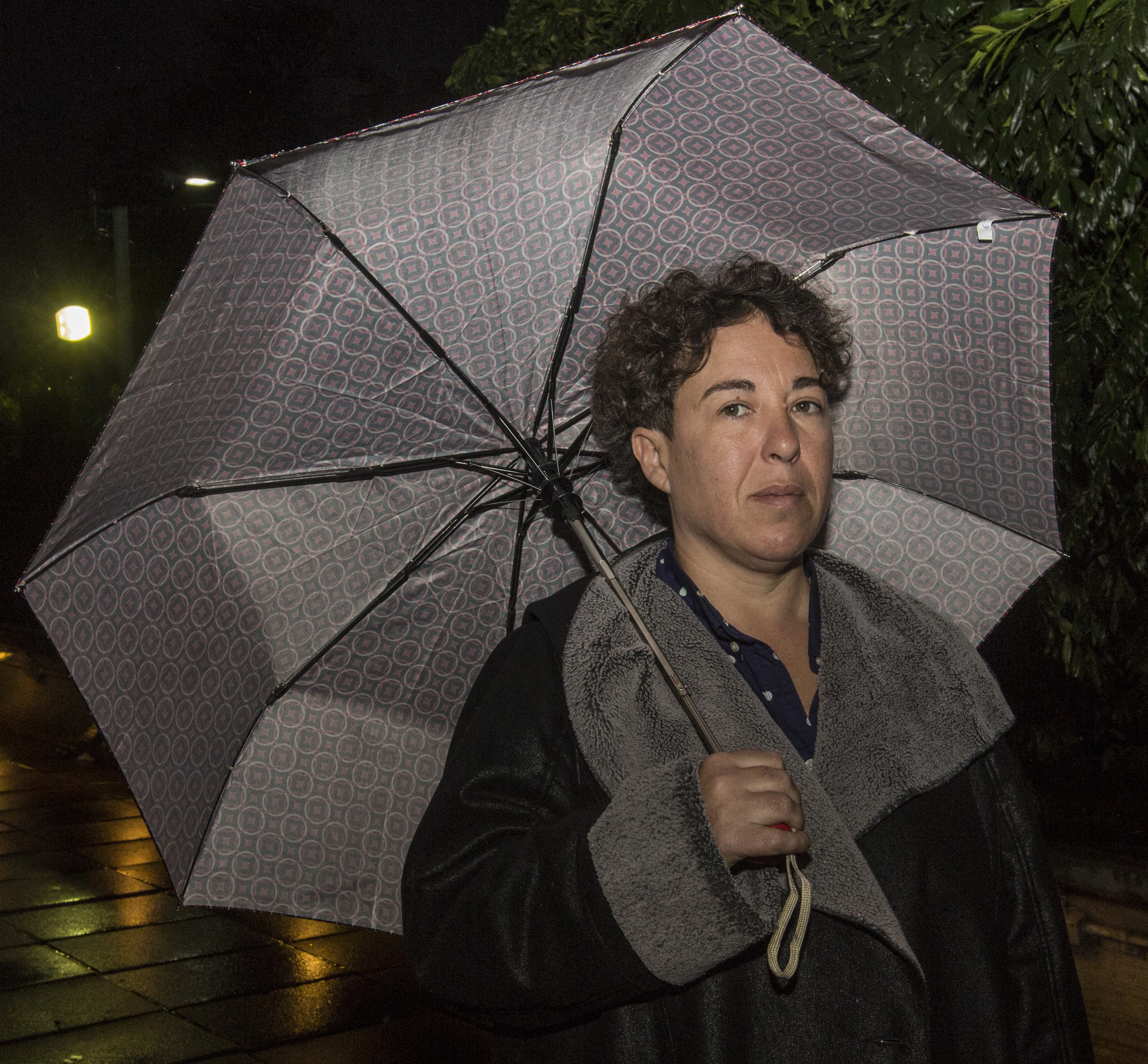
Gabriela Cabezón Cámara in 2016

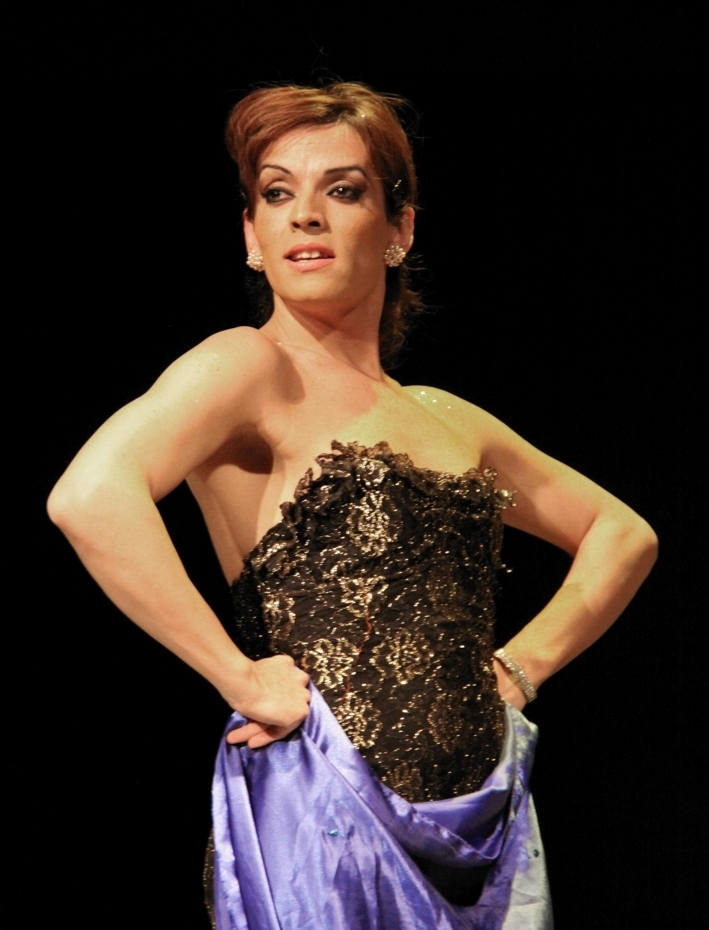
Camila Sosa Villada in 2019

In the 21st century, the number of works with LGBT themes increased thanks to authors like Gabriela Massuh, Anshi Moran, Susy Shock, Naty Menstrual, Facundo R. Soto, Susana Guzner, and Patricia Kolesnicov. Some of the best-known works are novels like:

- El común olvido ("The Forgotten Majority," 2002) by Sylvia Molloy, which has some characteristics of autofiction and which follows the story of a young homosexual man named Daniel who travels from the United States to Argentina to search for the truth about his mother's passing and the romantic relationship she maintained with a woman named Charlotte.
- El niño pez ("The Fish Child," 2004) by Lucía Puenzo, which follows the romance between an upper-class girl named Lala with la Guayi, her Paraguayan housekeeper, and which the author adapted into a screenplay.
- Brickmakers (2013) by Selva Almada, which narrates the romance between two boys amid their families' rivalry, a sort of homosexual parallel to Romeo and Juliet.
- Works by the punk poet Ioshua, who began his literary career in the 2000s, also stand out. One of his principal themes is homosexual desire in marginalized neighborhoods in Greater Buenos Aires.

One particularly notable figure is that of Gabriela Cabezón Cámara, who began to explore the topic of sexual diversity in her novel La Virgen Cabeza ("Slum Virgin," 2009), which tells the story of Cleopatra, a transvestite who becomes a religious leader in a villa miseria and who later begins a lesbian relationship with a journalist named Qüity. Cabezón Cámara returned to take on lesbian relationships in her novels Romance de la negra rubia (2014) and Las aventuras de la China Iron ("The Adventures of China Iron," 2017) with which she achieved international critical success and for which she was nominated for the prestigious International Booker Prize in 2020. In this work, the author takes the character of Martín Fierro's partner, known as "La China," and makes her into the protagonist of a story with which she carries out a queer exploration of Guacho literature.

Another author who has achieved great success in this genre is transgender writer Camila Sosa Villada, with her works like Tesis de una domesticación ("Thesis of a Domestication") and especially Las Malas ("Bad Girls," 2019). This novel sketches the life of a group of crossdressers dedicated to prostitution as a form of survival. The book became a national bestseller, with eight editions published in its first year in Argentina. This work also won the Sor Juana Inés de la Cruz Prize in 2020.

Transgender literature has also recently reached new heights with authors like I Acevedo, Carolina Unrein, Marlene Wayar and the very same Camila Sosa Villada.

== See also ==
- LGBT in Argentina
- LGBT literature in Colombia
- LGBT literature in Ecuador
- LGBT literature in El Salvador
- LGBT literature in Mexico
- LGBT literature in Spain
- Bengali Queer Literature

== Bibliography ==
- Arnés, Laura A. (2016). Ficciones lesbianas: Literatura y afectos en la cultura argentina. (Lesbian fiction: Literature and its affects on Argentine culture). Buenos Aires: Madreselva. ISBN 978-987-3861-07-9 OCLC 985305089
- Melo, Adrián (2011). Historia de la literatura gay en la argentina. Representaciones sociales de la homosexualidad masculina en la ficción literaria. (History of gay literature in Argentina. Social representations of masculine homosexuality in literary fiction). Buenos Aires: Ediciones LEA. ISBN 978-987-634-531-6
