= Emma Barrandeguy =

Argentine writer, journalist, poet, storyteller and playwright

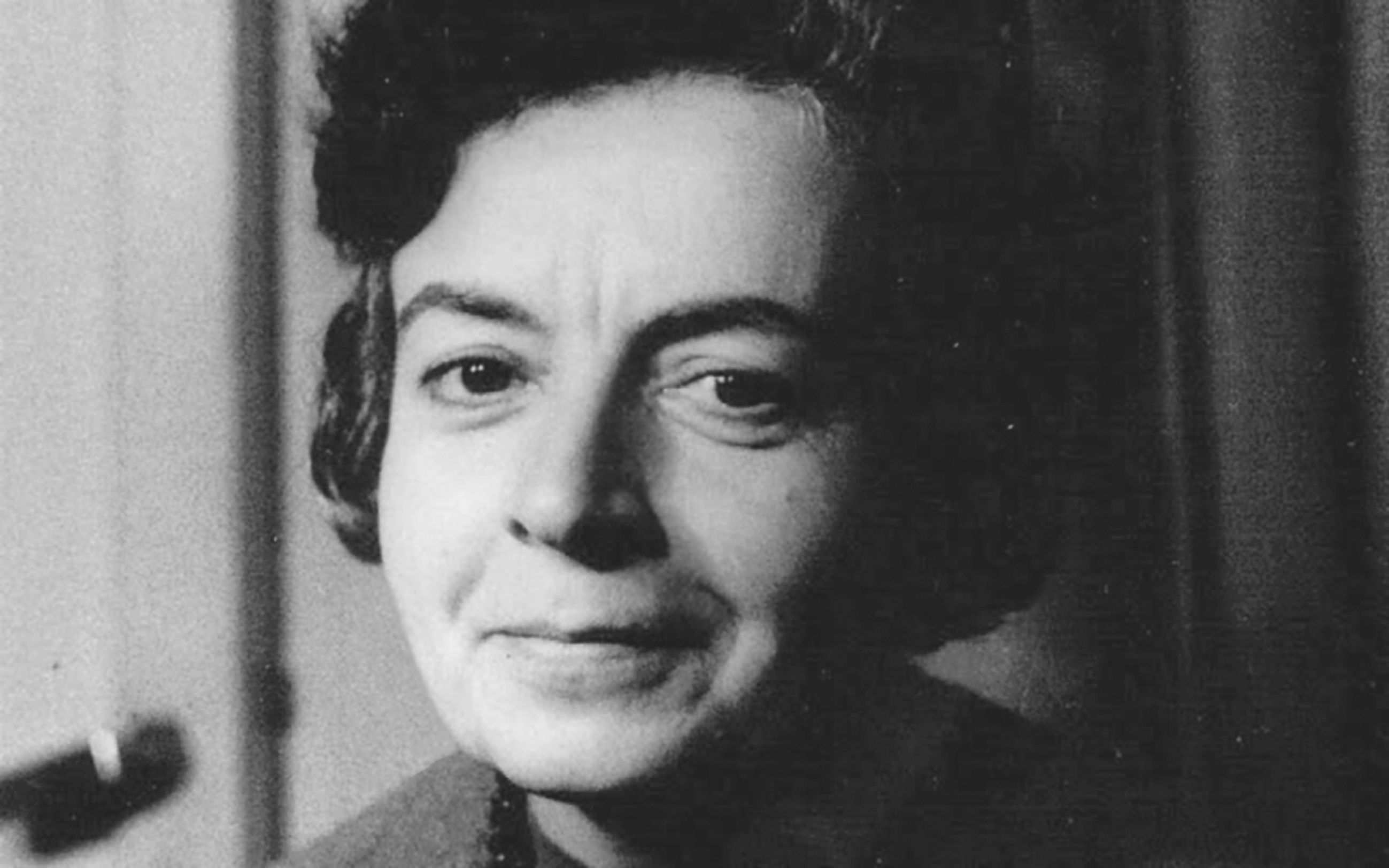
Emma Barrandeguy

Emma Barrandeguy (8 March 1914 – 19 December 2006) was an Argentine writer, journalist, poet, storyteller and playwright.

== Biography ==
Barrandeguy was born in 1914 in Gualeguay, Entre Ríos.

Her first poems were published when she was 18. Her first book was published when she was 50; it contained poems which she wrote in a diary. Barrandeguy had various jobs, including archivist, writer, journalist, librarian, and jewelry sales. She published articles about astrology, and served as the private secretary of Salvadora Medina Onrubia de Botana, the spouse of Natalio Botana. For 20 years, she directed the cultural section in a local newspaper in Gualeguay, El Debate Cry. She also worked for the Gualeguaychú regional newspaper, La Verdad, and worked as a translator for the publishers of El Ateneo and Emecé.

Barrandeguy worked at the Institute of Cancer and died of cancer in 2006 at age 92 in Gualeguay.

== Awards ==
She was awarded the Premio Fray Mocho in 1970 for the play "Amor saca amor"; and in 1985, for her novel "Crónicas de medio siglo".

== Selected works ==
- Poesías completas, 2009
- Mastronardi-Gombrowicz: una amistad singular, 2004
- Habitaciones, 2002
- Salvadora, una mujer de Crítica, 1997
- Camino hecho, 1996
- Crónica de medio siglo, 1986
- Refracciones, 1986
- Crónica de medio siglo, 1984
- Los pobladores, 1983
- No digo que mi país es poderoso, 1982
- Amor saca amor (teatro), 1970
- El andamio (novela), 1964
- Cartas, 1943
- Las puertas, 1964
- Poemas, 1934–35

== See also ==
- List of Argentine writers
