= Diamond, Honour and Mercosur Konex Award winners =

Diamond Konex Award winners

Year	Discipline	Laureated	Notes / Other important awards won
2025	Popular Music	Charly García	Latin Grammy Lifetime Achievement Award.
2024	Literature	María Moreno	Manuel Rojas Ibero-American Narrative Award.
2023	Science and Technology	Sandra Myrna Díaz	Princess of Asturias for Technical and Scientific Research and Ramon Margalef in Ecology.
2023	Science and Technology	Gabriel Rabinovich	TWAS Prize in Medical Sciences.
2022	Visual Arts	Julio Le Parc	Grand Prize for Painting at the Venice Biennale.
2022	Visual Arts	Marta Minujín	Premio Velázquez de Artes Plásticas.
2021	Entertainment	Marilú Marini	Molière Award for Best Actress nomination. Prix de la meilleure comédienne du Syndicat de la critique.
2020	Sports	Lionel Messi	Gold medal in the Olympics. Laureus World Sports Award, The Best FIFA Football Award, Ballon d'Or, World Soccer Player of the Year, Onze d'Or, L'Équipe Champion of Champions, Marca Leyenda, European Golden Shoe, FIFA World Cup Golden Ball and Presidential Medal of Freedom.
2019	Classical Music	Oscar Araiz	
2018	Institutions-Communities-Companies	INVAP	
2018	Institutions-Communities-Companies	Luis Pagani	
2017	Communication-Journalism	Hermenegildo Sábat	María Moors Cabot and Gabriel García Márquez Journalism Prize.
2016	Humanities	José Emilio Burucúa (hijo)	
2016	Humanities	Aída Kemelmajer de Carlucci	
2015	Popular Music	Dino Saluzzi	
2014	Literature	Abelardo Castillo	Casa de las Américas Prize.
2014	Literature	Ricardo Piglia	Casa de las Américas, Formentor, Rómulo Gallegos, Premio Hammett, Premio de la Crítica Española and Manuel Rojas Ibero-American Narrative Award.
2013	Science and Technology	Alberto Kornblihtt	
2013	Science and Technology	Juan Martín Maldacena	Fundamental Physics Prize, Dannie Heineman for Mathematical Physics, Dirac and Lorentz and Albert Einstein medals.
2012	Visual Arts	León Ferrari	Golden Lion at the Venice Biennale.
2012	Visual Arts	César Pelli	AIA Gold Medal and Cemex Building Award.
2011	Entertainment	Ricardo Darín	Platino, New York Latin ACE, Goya, CEC, Gaudí, Gold Medal of Merit in the Fine Arts; and awards at the San Sebastian, Valladolid and Havana film festivals.
2010	Sports	Emanuel Ginóbili	Gold and bronze medals in the Olympics. NBA Sixth Man of the Year Award and Euroleague Final Four Most Valuable Player. He was inducted into the Basketball Hall of Fame, the All-NBA Team and the 50 Greatest Euroleague Contributors.
2009	Classical Music	Daniel Barenboim	Wolf, Grammy, Gramophone, Ernst von Siemens, Classic Brit, Léonie Sonning, Princess of Asturias for Concord, Praemium Imperiale and Otto Hahn Peace Medal. He was inducted into the Gramophone Hall of Fame.
2008	Institutions-Communities-Companies	Carlos Fayt	
2007	Communication-Journalism	Magdalena Ruiz Guiñazú	Lifetime Achievement Award from the International Women's Media Foundation.
2006	Humanities	Julio H. G. Olivera	
2005	Popular Music	Horacio Salgán	
2004	Literature	Héctor Tizón	
2003	Science and Technology	Luis Caffarelli	Abel, Wolf, Shock, Leroy P. Steele, Bôcher and Shaw.
2003	Science and Technology	Mirta Roses Periago	
2002	Visual Arts	Víctor Grippo	
2002	Visual Arts	Luis Felipe Noé	
2001	Entertainment	Norma Aleandro	Academy Award and Golden Globe nominations. New York Film Critics Circle Award, David di Donatello, New York Latin ACE, Obie; and awards at the Cannes, San Sebastian, Havana, Huelva and Cartagena film festivals.
2000	Sports	Gabriela Sabatini	Silver medal in the Olympics. She was inducted into the International Tennis Hall of Fame; and into The 40 Greatest Players of the Tennis Era and The 50 Greatest Players of the Open Era lists (both from Tennis Magazine).
1999	Classical Music	Martha Argerich	Wolf, Grammy, Gramophone, Ernst von Siemens, Classic Brit, Kennedy Center Honor and Praemium Imperiale. She was inducted into the Gramophone Hall of Fame.
1998	Institutions-Communities-Companies	Caritas Argentina	
1998	Institutions-Communities-Companies	Carlos Manuel Muñiz	
1998	Institutions-Communities-Companies	Roberto Rocca	
1997	Communication-Journalism	Mariano Grondona	
1996	Humanities	Gregorio Klimovsky	International Psychoanalytical Association Award.
1995	Popular Music	Mercedes Sosa	6 Latin Grammys.
1994	Literature	Adolfo Bioy Casares	Cervantes, Alfonso Reyes International Prize and Prix du Meilleur Livre Étranger.
1993	Science and Technology	René Favaloro	Gairdner Foundation International Award, Golden Plate and Prince Mahidol.
1993	Science and Technology	César Milstein	Nobel in Physiology or Medicine, Wolf, Gairdner Foundation International Award, Robert Koch, Louisa Gross Horwitz, Albert Lasker Award for Basic Medical Research and Copley Medal.
1992	Visual Arts	Juan Carlos Distéfano	
1991	Entertainment	María Rosa Gallo	
1990	Sports	Diego Maradona	FIFA Player of the Century, World Soccer Player of the Year, Onze d'Or, L'Équipe Champion of Champions, Marca Leyenda, United Press International Athlete of the Year Award, South American Footballer of the Year and FIFA World Cup Golden Ball. He was inducted into World Soccer The Greatest Players of the 20th century and The Greatest South-American Players of the 20th century by IFFHS.
1989	Classical Music	Ljerko Spiller	
1988	Institutions-Communities-Companies	Fundación Alfredo Fortabat and María Amalia Lacroze de Fortabat	
1988	Institutions-Communities-Companies	Guillermo Eduardo Alchouron	
1987	Communication-Journalism	Félix Hipólito Laíño	
1986	Humanities	Gregorio Weinberg	Gabriela Mistral Inter-American Prize for Culture.
1985	Popular Music	Atahualpa Yupanqui	Grand Prix du Disque, Deutscher Schallplattenpreis, Premio Ondas and award at the Sanremo Music Festival.
1984	Literature	Jorge Luis Borges	Cervantes, Formentor, Alfonso Reyes International Prize, National Book Critics Circle Award, Jerusalem, Prix mondial Cino Del Duca, World Fantasy Award for Life Achievement, Balzan and Special Edgar. He was inducted as author into the El Mundo List of the 100 Best Novels in Spanish; the Le Monde's 100 Books of the Century and the Bokklubben World Library.
1983	Science and Technology	Luis Federico Leloir	Nobel in Chemistry, Gairdner Foundation International Award and Louisa Gross Horwitz.
1982	Visual Arts	Horacio Butler	
1981	Entertainment	Alfredo Alcón	Max Award for Best Actor nomination. Cartagena International Film Festival Award for Best Actor.
1981	Entertainment	Luisa Vehil	
1980	Sports	Juan Manuel Fangio	He was inducted into the International Motorsports Hall of Fame.

Honour Konex Award winners

Year	Discipline	Laureated	Notes / Other important awards won
2025	Popular Music	Javier Martínez	
2025	Popular Music	Mariano Mores	He was inducted into the Latin Songwriters Hall of Fame.
2024	Literature	Luis Chitarroni	
2023	Science and Technology	Eduardo Charreau	
2023	Science and Technology	Christiane Dosne de Pasqualini	
2022	Visual Arts	Quino	Princess of Asturias for Communication and Humanities and Haxtur Award.
2021	Espectáculos	Agustín Alezzo	
2021	Espectáculos	Leonardo Favio	Goya and awards at the Cartagena and Mar del Plata film festivals.
2020	Sports	Roberto De Vicenzo	Bob Jones Award. He was inducted into the World Golf Hall of Fame.
2019	Classical Music	Gerardo Gandini	Latin Grammy, Tomás Luis de Victoria Prize and award at the Venice International Film Festival.
2018	Institutions-Communities-Companies	Raúl Alfonsín	Former President of Argentina. Princess of Asturias for International Cooperation.
2017	Communication-Journalism	Pepe Eliaschev	
2016	Humanities	Aldo Ferrer	
2016	Humanities	Segundo V. Linares Quintana	
2015	Popular Music	Luis Alberto Spinetta	6 Latin Grammy nominations. He was inducted as a member of Almendra into the Latin Grammy Hall of Fame.
2014	Literature	María Elena Walsh	Highly Commended by the Hans Christian Andersen Award.
2013	Science and Technology	Rolando García	
2012	Visual Arts	Carmelo Arden Quin	
2011	Entertainment	Alejandra Boero	
2010	Sports	Alberto Demiddi	Silver and bronze medals in the Olympics and gold medal in the Pan American Games.
2009	Classical Music	Carlos Guastavino	
2009	Classical Music	Mauricio Kagel	Ernst von Siemens Music Prize, Shock and Erasmus.
2008	Institutions-Communities-Companies	Rogelio Frigerio	
2007	Communication-Journalism	Jacobo Timerman	María Moors Cabot, Letelier-Moffitt Human Rights Award, Conscience-in-Media and World Association of Newspapers' Golden Pen of Freedom Award.
2006	Humanities	Manuel Sadosky	
2005	Popular Music	Osvaldo Pugliese	
2004	Literature	Olga Orozco	Gabriela Mistral Inter-American Prize for Culture and FIL Literary Award in Romance Languages.
2003	Science and Technology	Hilario Fernández Long	
2003	Science and Technology	Osvaldo Fustinoni	
2003	Science and Technology	Luis A. Santaló	Princess of Asturias Award for Technical and Scientific Research.
2002	Visual Arts	Líbero Badii	
2002	Visual Arts	Alberto Heredia	
2001	Entertainment	María Luisa Bemberg	Academy Award for Best International Feature Film nomination. Awards at the Venice, Havana, Huelva and Cartagena film festivals.
2000	Sports	Adolfo Pedernera	He was inducted into The Greatest South-American Players of the 20th century by IFFHS.
1999	Classical Music	Roberto Caamaño	
1999	Classical Music	Guillermo Graetzer	
1998	Institutions-Communities-Companies	José Estenssoro	
1998	Institutions-Communities-Companies	Arturo Frondizi	Former President of Argentina.
1998	Institutions-Communities-Companies	Fulvio Salvador Pagani	
1997	Communication-Journalism	Fioravanti	
1996	Humanities	Eugenio Pucciarelli	
1995	Popular Music	Astor Piazzolla	2 Grammy nominations. César Award for Best Original Music. He was inducted into the International Latin Music Hall of Fame and the Latin Grammy Hall of Fame.
1994	Literatura	Ángel Battistessa	
1993	Science and Technology	Alfredo Lanari	
1992	Visual Arts	Raquel Forner	
1991	Entertainment	Saulo Benavente	
1990	Sports	Oscar Alfredo Gálvez	
1989	Classical Music	Juan José Castro	
1989	Classical Music	Alberto Ginastera	
1988	Institutions-Communities-Companies	Alicia Moreau de Justo	
1988	Institutions-Communities-Companies	Agostino Rocca	
1987	Communication-Journalism	Edmundo Guibourg	
1986	Humanities	Raúl Prebisch	Jawaharlal Nehru Award.
1985	Popular Music	Carlos Gardel	Grammy Hall of Fame Award. He was inducted into the International Latin Music Hall of Fame, the Latin Songwriters Hall of Fame and the Latin Grammy Hall of Fame.
1984	Literature	Julio Cortázar	Prix Médicis. He was inducted as author into the El Mundo List of the 100 Best Novels in Spanish.
1983	Science and Technology	Bernardo Alberto Houssay	Nobel Prize in Physiology or Medicine.
1982	Visual Arts	Antonio Berni	Grand Prize for Printmaking at the Venice Biennale.
1981	Entertainment	Luis Sandrini	
1980	Sports	Jorge Newbery	

Mercosur Konex Award winners

Year	Discipline	Laureated	Country	Notes / Other important awards won
2024	Literature	Ailton Krenak	Brazil	Prince Claus Award.
2022	Visual Arts	Alfredo Jaar	Chile	Hasselblad Award.
2022	Visual Arts	Rosana Paulino	Brazil	
2022	Visual Arts	Ana Tiscornia	Uruguay	
2019	Classical Music	José Antonio Abreu	Venezuela	Polar Music Prize, Latin Grammy, Princess of Asturias Award for Arts and Erasmus.
2019	Classical Music	Gustavo Dudamel	Venezuela	Grammy and Gramophone. He was inducted into the Gramophone Hall of Fame.
2019	Classical Music	Juan Diego Flórez	Peru	Grammy Award for Best Classical Solo Vocal Album nomination.
2019	Classical Music	Nelson Freire	Brazil	Latin Grammy and Gramophone.
2017	Communication-Journalism	Dorrit Harazim	Brazil	Gabriel García Márquez Journalism Prize.
2017	Communication-Journalism	Mónica González Mujica	Chile	Gabriel García Márquez Journalism Prize, María Moors Cabot and UNESCO/Guillermo Cano World Press Freedom Prize.
2017	Communication-Journalism	Jorge Traverso	Uruguay	
2015	Popular Music	Hugo Fattoruso	Uruguay	Latin Grammy Lifetime Achievement Award.
2013	Science and Technology	Jorge Allende	Chile	
2013	Science and Technology	Ricardo Ehrlich	Uruguay	
2013	Science and Technology	Nelson Maculan	Brazil	
2011	Entertainment	Estela Medina	Uruguay	
2010	Sports	Gustavo Kuerten	Brazil	ATP World Tour Award. He was inducted into the International Tennis Hall of Fame; and into The 40 Greatest Players of the Tennis Era and The 50 Greatest Players of the Open Era lists (both from Tennis Magazine).
2008	Institutions-Communities-Companies	Fernando Henrique Cardoso	Brazil	Former President of Brazil. Princess of Asturias Award for International Cooperation.
2008	Institutions-Communities-Companies	Ricardo Lagos	Chile	Former President of Chile.
2008	Institutions-Communities-Companies	Julio María Sanguinetti	Uruguay	Former President of Uruguay.
2006	Humanities	Helio Jaguaribe	Brazil	
2004	Literature	Rubem Fonseca	Brazil	Camões, Casa de las Américas, FIL Literary Award in Romance Languages and Manuel Rojas Ibero-American Narrative Award.
2004	Literature	Nicanor Parra	Chile	Cervantes, FIL Literary Award in Romance Languages, Pablo Neruda Ibero-American Poetry Award and Queen Sofía Ibero-American Poetry Prize.
2004	Literature	Augusto Roa Bastos	Paraguay	Cervantes Prize. He was inducted as author into the El Mundo List of the 100 Best Novels in Spanish.
2004	Literature	Néstor Taboada Terán	Bolivia	
2004	Literature	Mario Vargas Llosa	Peru	Nobel in Literature, Cervantes, Princess of Asturias Award for Literature, Alfonso Reyes International Prize, National Book Critics Circle Award, Jerusalem, Prix mondial Cino Del Duca, Rómulo Gallegos, Premio de la Crítica Española, María Moors Cabot and Prix du Meilleur Livre Étranger. He was inducted as author into the El Mundo List of the 100 Best Novels in Spanish.
2004	Literature	Idea Vilariño	Uruguay	Casa de las Américas Prize.
2002	Visual Arts	Luis Camnitzer	Uruguay	
2002	Visual Arts	Carlos Colombino	Paraguay	
2002	Visual Arts	Eugenio Dittborn	Chile	
2002	Visual Arts	Oscar Niemeyer	Brazil	Golden Lion at the Venice Biennale of Architecture. Pritzker, Princess of Asturias Award for Arts, Lenin Peace Prize, Praemium Imperiale and Royal Gold Medal.
2002	Visual Arts	Gastón Ugalde	Bolivia	
