= Hebe Uhart =

Argentine writer (1936–2018)

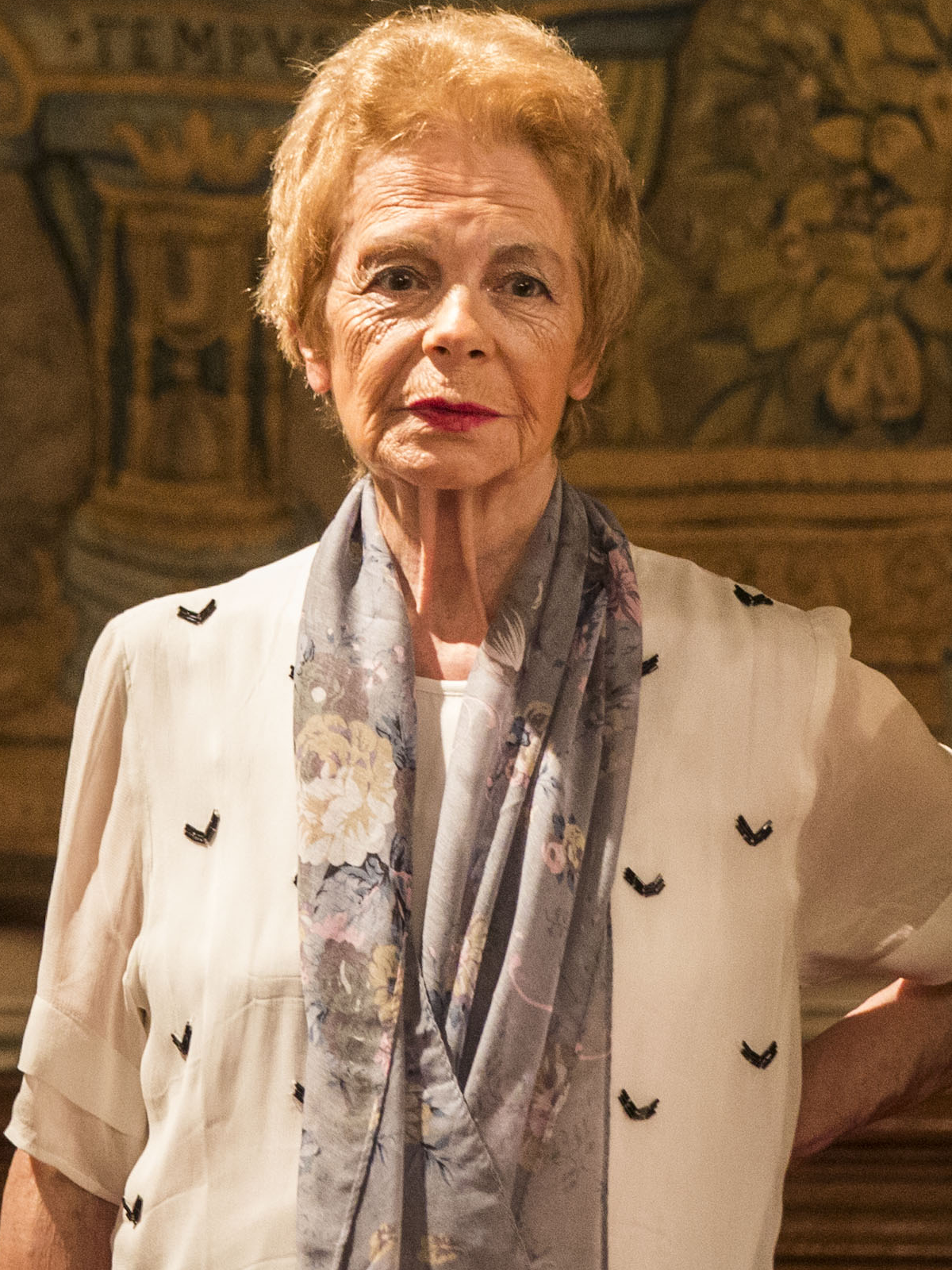
- Born: 2 December 1936; Moreno, Argentina
- Died: 11 October 2018 (aged 81); Buenos Aires, Argentina
- Education: University of Buenos Aires
- Occupations: Writer, professor
- Awards: Konex Award (2004, 2014); Manuel Rojas Ibero-American Narrative Award (2017)

Hebe Uhart (2 December 1936 – 11 October 2018) was an Argentine writer. In 2017, she received the Manuel Rojas Ibero-American Narrative Award.

== Career ==
Of her childhood and relationship with books, Hebe Uhart relates:

In my house I did not have access to reading – just some of my brother's books, which were very theological. I was not encouraged to write; nobody asked me or forced me to write. But, surely, there must have been an underground stimulus, something that is in the houses because, if not, why did my mother tell me so many stories? Until a cousin, more cultured, told me: "You have to read Neruda, Guillén and Vallejo." And I read them. Then I entered the Faculty of Philosophy and started to bond with other wise people with whom I talked about books.

She studied Philosophy at the University of Buenos Aires (UBA). Later she worked as a teacher, both at primary and secondary level, and university at the UBA and the National University of Lomas de Zamora.

She lived in Buenos Aires, where she gave literary workshops. She was a frequent contributor to newspapers and magazines, such as El País in Montevideo.

Her stories were adapted into the play Querida mamá o guiando la hiedra (transl. Dear Mom, or Guiding the Ivy), directed by Laura Yusem.

In 2010 she published a compilation of her short stories and novels from 1962 to 2004 in the volume Relatos reunidos (ISBN 9789870424598).

== Works ==
Uhart's works have been collected in numerous anthologies.

- 1962 – Dios, San Pedro y las almas (short stories)
- 1963 – Epi, Epi, Pamma sabhactani (short stories)
- 1970 – La gente de la casa rosa (short stories)
- 1974 – La elevación de Maruja (novella)
- 1976 – El budín esponjoso (short stories)
- 1983 – La luz de un nuevo día (short stories)
- 1986 – Leonor (novel)
- 1987 – Camilo asciende (novel)
- 1992 – Memorias de un pigmeo (short stories)
- 1995 – Mudanzas (novel)
- 1997 – Guiando la hiedra (short stories)
- 1999 – Señorita (novel)
- 2003 – Del cielo a casa (short stories)
- 2004 – Camilo asciende y otros relatos (short stories)
- 2008 – Turistas (short stories)
- 2010 – Relatos reunidos (short stories and novellas)
- 2011 – Viajera crónica (travel log)
- 2012 – Visto y oído (travel logs)
- 2015 – Un día cualquiera (mapa de las lenguas) (short stories)
- 2015 – De la Patagonia a México (travel logs)
- 2017 – De aquí para allá (travel logs)
- 2018 – Animales (tales)

== Awards and distinctions ==
- 2004 – Konex Award Merit Diploma, in the category "Cuento: quinquenio 1999–2003"
- 2011 – Book Foundation Award for Best Argentine Book of Literary Creation, for Relatos reunidos
- 2014 – Konex Award Merit Diploma, in the category "Cuento: quinquenio 2004–2008"
- 2015 – Fondo Nacional de las Artes Prize
- 2017 – Manuel Rojas Ibero-American Narrative Award
