= Salvadora =

Salvadora may refer to:

- Salvadora Medina Onrubia (1894-1972), Argentine poet, anarchist, feminist
- Salvadora (snake), a genus of patchnose snakes in the family Colubridae
- Salvadora (plant), a genus of flowering plants in the family Salvadoraceae
