= Crítica de la Argentina =

- Type: Daily newspaper
- Owner: Antonio Mata
- Editor: Jorge Lanata (2008–09); Daniel Capalbo (2009–10)
- Founded: March 2, 2008
- Ceased publication: April 30, 2010; 15 years ago
- Language: Spanish
- Headquarters: Buenos Aires
- Circulation: 80,000 (in 2008)

Crítica de la Argentina was a daily newspaper from Buenos Aires, Argentina that was published between 2008 and 2010.

== History ==
The name Crítica de la Argentina was a throwback to La Crítica, founded by Natalio Botana and published between 1913 and 1962. During the 1920s, La Crítica was the most widely circulated in Latin America.

Crítica de la Argentina was founded on March 2, 2008, by prominent local journalist Jorge Lanata, and initially enjoyed a circulation of over 80,000 copies. Its rapid decline, to around 6,000, and differences with the paper's majority stakeholder, Antonio Mata, led Lanata to resign as editor in April 2009 (he continued to contribute columns).

After Lanata's resignation, it was directed by a group conformed by Nerina Sturgeon, Alejandro Bianchi, Daniel Álvarez, Silvio Santamarina and Daniel Capalbo. The news daily failed to recover, however, and amid a strike resulting from unpaid salaries, Crítica ceased publication on April 30, 2010.
