= María Moreno (writer) =

Argentine writer, journalist, and cultural critic

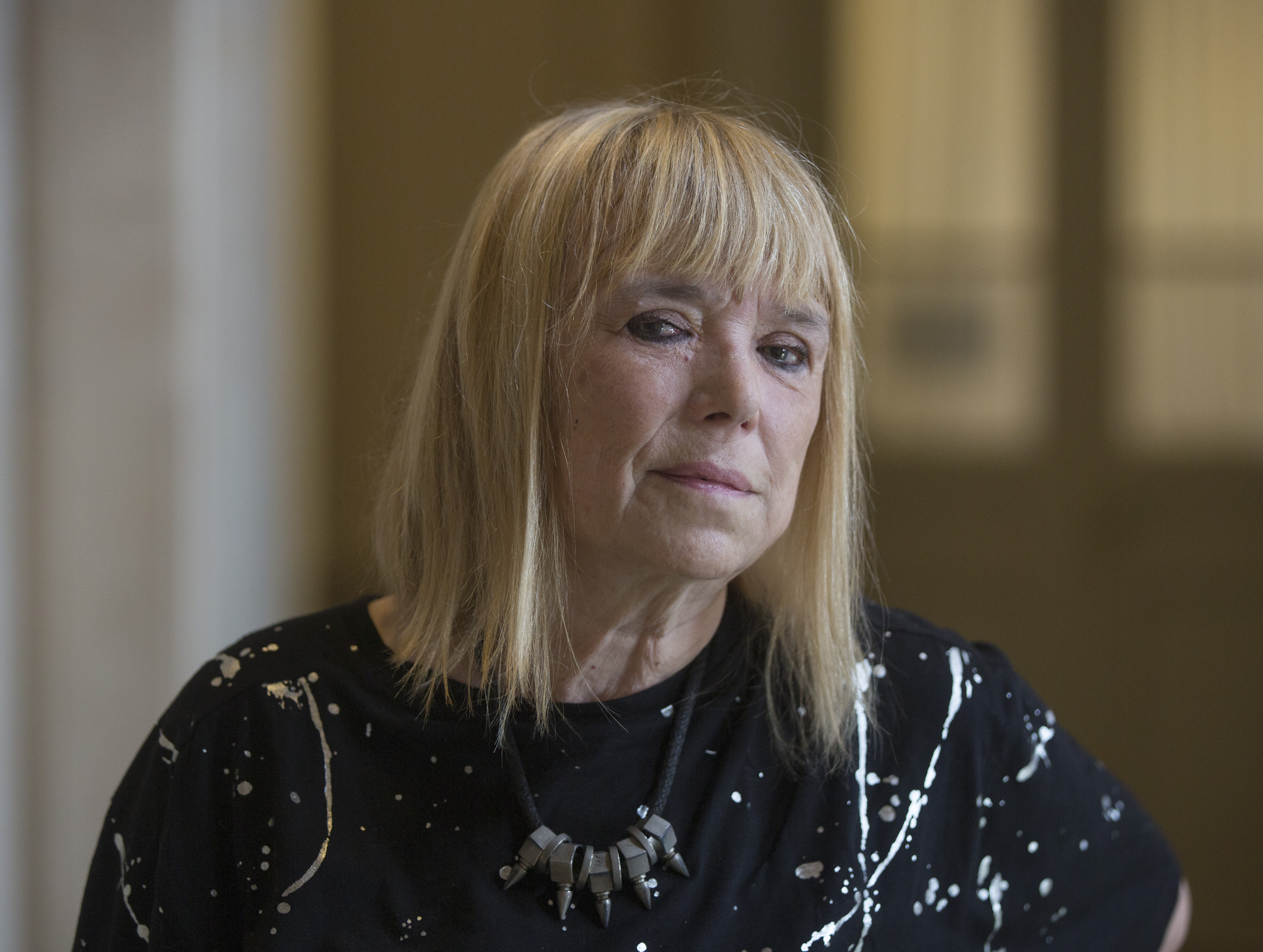
- Moreno in 2020
- Born: María Cristina Forero; 7 May 1947 (age 77); Buenos Aires, Argentina
- Occupation(s): Writer, journalist, cultural critic
- Spouse: Marcelo A. Moreno (divorced)
- Awards: Guggenheim Fellowship (2002); Lola Mora Award (2011); Manuel Rojas Ibero-American Narrative Award (2019)

María Cristina Forero (born 7 May 1947), known by her pseudonym María Moreno, is an Argentine writer, journalist, and cultural critic. Considered one of the most prominent contemporary Argentine chroniclers and essayists, she has dedicated herself to journalistic work and writings related to women's and feminist themes, in addition to fiction.

UBA academic Laura A. Arnés described her first novel, El affair Skeffington, as one of the three "central novels for an Argentine lesbian tradition", along with En breve cárcel by Sylvia Molloy and Monte de Venus by Reina Roffé. Her second novel, Black out (2016), was internationally acclaimed and received the Critics' Award for Best Argentine Creative Writing.

== Early years ==
María Cristina Forero was born in Buenos Aires on 7 May 1947. She married journalist Marcelo A. Moreno, and they had one son together. At age 26, she began writing articles signed with her husband's name, which he submitted to the newspaper La Opinión. When his editor praised one of these, he admitted the ruse, but rather than being upset, the editor invited her to continue contributing, which she did under the name María Moreno. She retained this penname after she and Marcelo divorced. In an article for Clarín titled "La chillona alegría de una época" (The Shrill Joy of an Era), she explained,

On my identity document it says Cristina Forero, and by then I had already begun to sign María Moreno. Feminists reproach me for using my ex-husband's surname. I answer that I use the surname of Mariano Moreno, the first Argentine journalist, but they don't believe me. They also don't believe that I use the surname of Colette's best friend, the actress Marguerite Moreno, who was described as a mix of Ximena and El Cid, a unique being. That is to say, I desired "Moreno" before I desired the man who had that surname. But since feminists still don't believe me, I answer them that I am so, so feminist that, instead of using my father's or my ex-husband's surname, I use my son Manuel's.

She went on to write for the magazines Sur and Babel, and the TV program Fin de siglo. In addition, she was an editorial secretary for the newspaper Tiempo Argentino. In 1984, she founded Alfonsina, the first feminist magazine of the return to democracy after the National Reorganization Process.

== Literary career ==
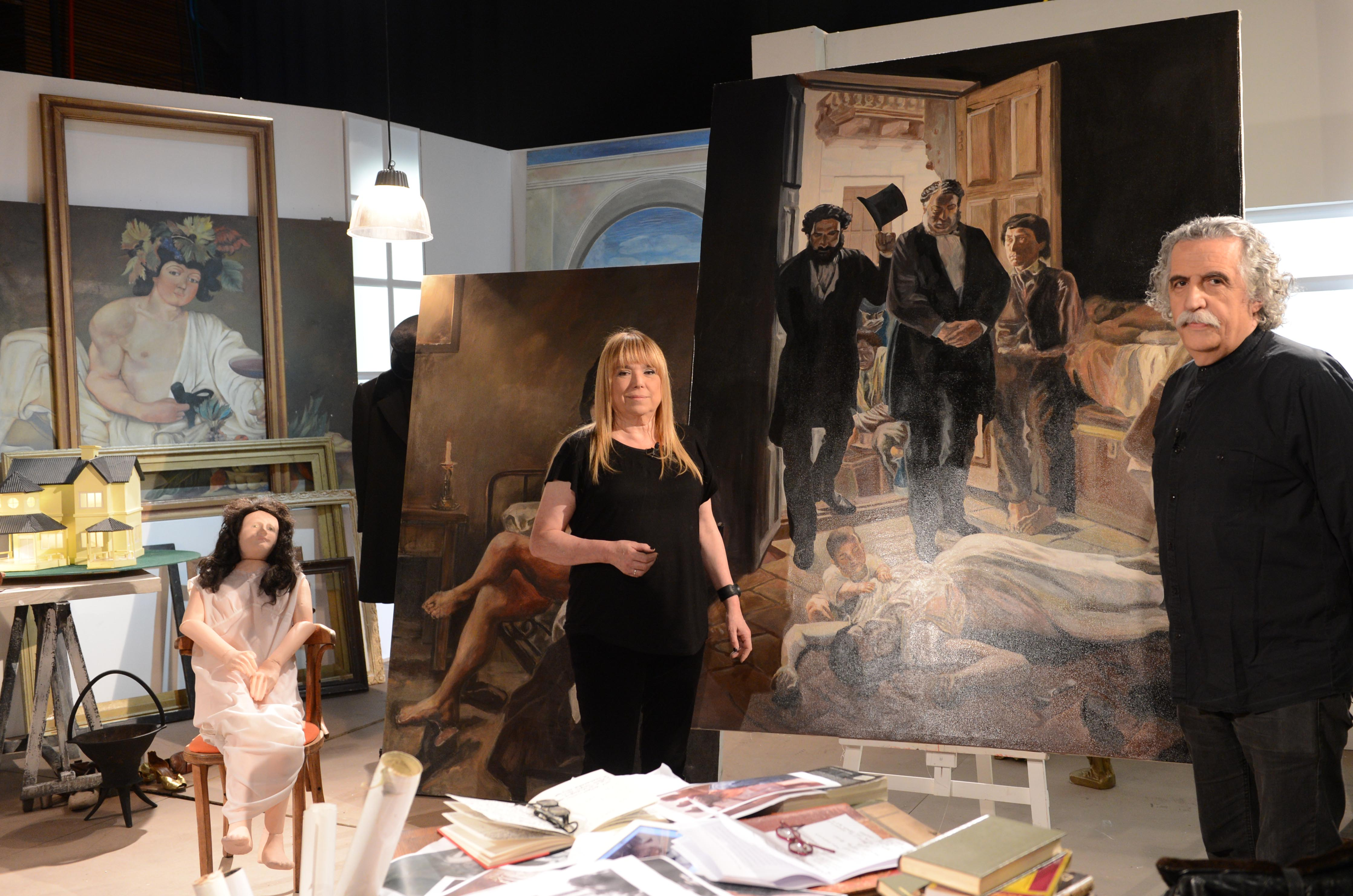
Moreno with Daniel Santoro on La patria a cuadros in 2015

In 1992, Moreno published her first book, the novel El affair Skeffington, about a poet in the so-called "Paris-Lesbos" of the 1920s and '30s. In 1994, she published the nonfiction chronicle El Petiso Orejudo. In 1999, she received the Nexo Award for her work against discrimination based on gender identity.

The following decade, she published the essay books A tontas ya locas (2001), El fin del sexo y otras mentiras (2002), Vida de vivos (2005), and Banco a la sombra (2007). In 2002, she obtained a Guggenheim Fellowship. In 2005, she hosted the television program Portaretratos on the channel Ciudad Abierta. From 2005 to 2010, she was the communications coordinator of the Centro Cultural Ricardo Rojas.

In 2007, she received a teacher's award from the School Agency Workshop.

In 2011, Moreno published the chronicle La comuna de Buenos Aires. Relatos al pie del 2001, about the December 2001 crisis, and the essay collection Teoría de la noche. That year she also received a Lola Mora Award for lifetime achievement from the Buenos Aires Legislature.

In 2013, she published Subrayados. Leer hasta que la muerte nos separe, a collection of literary essays on authors such as Vladimir Nabokov and Roland Barthes. In 2015, she co-directed the program La patria a cuadros on Televisión Pública with painter Daniel Santoro. In 2016, she published her second novel, Black out, a mix of chronicle, essay, and autobiography, which was well received by critics and earned her international recognition and the Critics' Award for Best Argentine Creative Writing.

In 2018, Moreno published the essay books Oración. Carta a Vicki y otras elegías políticas and Panfleto. Erótica y feminismo. In 2019, she edited Loquibambia, a book of "queer etchings". In 2020, she published the memoir Contramarcha. The same year, she was appointed director of the Museum of Books and Language. She also received the Manuel Rojas Ibero-American Narrative Award for her "groundbreaking and multifaceted" work.

In July 2021, the writer suffered a stroke, from which she recovered by 2023. In 2022, Random House reissued her first novel. In November 2023, she published her twelfth book of essays, Pero aun así. Elogios y despedidas. The same month, she received Revista Ñ's Lifetime Achievement Award.

In 2024, Moreno received a Diamond Konex Award as the most important writer in the last decade in Argentina.

== Works ==
=== Fiction ===
- El affair Skeffington (1992), Bajo la Luna; reissued (2022), Random House
- Black out (2016), Random House

=== Chronicles ===
- El Petiso Orejudo (1994), Planeta
- La comuna de Buenos Aires. Relatos al pie del 2001 (2011), Capital Intelectual

=== Essays ===
- A tontas y a locas (2001), Sudamericana; reissued (2017), 17grises
- El fin del sexo y otras mentiras (2002), Sudamericana
- Vida de vivos (2005), Sudamericana
- Banco a la sombra (2007), Sudamericana
- Teoría de la noche (2011), Ediciones UDP
- Subrayados. Leer hasta que la muerte nos separe (2013), Mardulce
- Oración. Carta a Vicki y otras elegías políticas (2018), Random House
- Panfleto. Erótica y feminismo (2018), Random House
- Loquibambia (2019), Ediciones UDP
- Y que se rompa todo corazón (2019), Random House
- Contramarcha (2020), Ampersand
- Pero aun así (2023), Random House

== Awards and recognition ==
- 1999: Nexo Award
- 2002: Guggenheim Fellowship
- 2007: Award from the School Agency Workshop
- 2011: Lola Mora Award
- 2017: Critics' Award for Best Argentine Creative Writing for Black out
- 2019: Manuel Rojas Ibero-American Narrative Award
- 2023: Ñ Lifetime Achievement Award
- 2024: Konex Award Diploma of Merit in the Biographies, Memoirs, and Diaries discipline
