= Copi =

Argentine writer

Raúl Damonte Botana
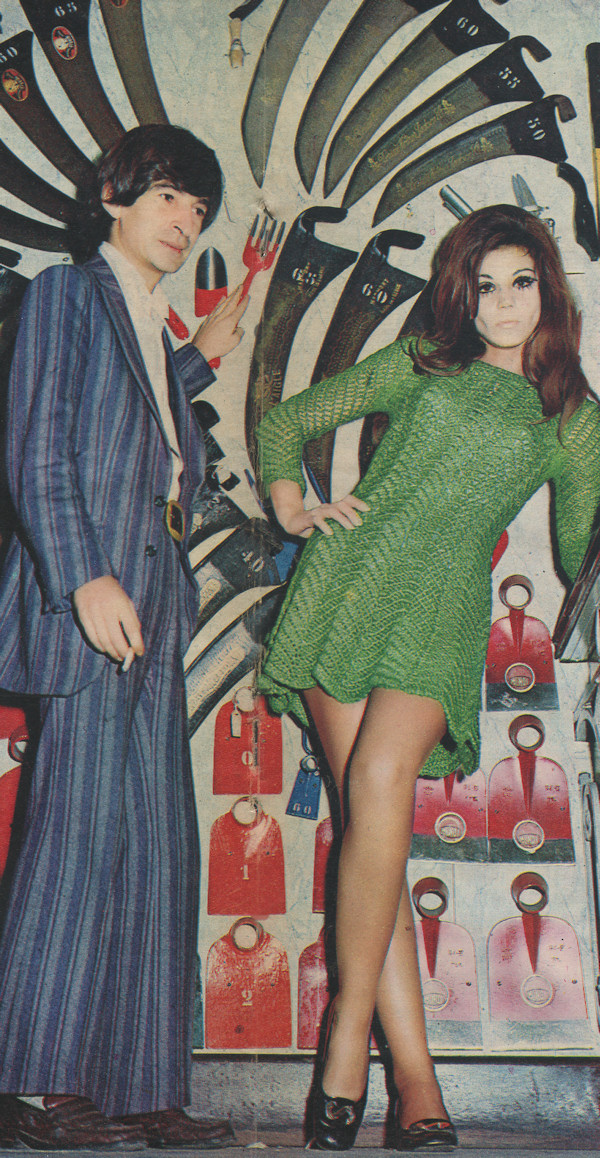
- Copi and Susana Giménez
- Born: November 20, 1939; Buenos Aires, Argentina
- Died: December 14, 1987 (aged 48); Paris, France
- Occupations: Writer, Cartoonist, Playwright
- Notable work: La Femme assise (The Sitting Woman)

Raúl Damonte Botana (November 20, 1939 – December 14, 1987), better known by the nom de plume Copi (French: [kɔpi]; from "copito de nieve", Spanish for "little snowflake"), was an Argentine writer, cartoonist, and playwright who spent most of his career in Paris.

== Biography ==
Damonte spent most of his youth in Montevideo. His maternal grandfather was the journalist Natalio Félix Botana and his father was the journalist Raúl Damonte Taborda, an antiperonist Radical politician and director of the journal Tribuna Popular. Raúl showed an early talent for drawing and, from his adolescence, contributed caricatures to his father's publication and to the satirical magazine Tía Vicenta.

His father's political activities forced the family into exile in Uruguay, Haiti, and later New York City. He finally settled in Paris, where he embarked on a career as a cartoonist for such newspapers as Le Nouvel Observateur. His most notable character during this period was La Femme assise (The Sitting Woman).

He was a member of Tse, an association of Franco-Argentine artists with whom in 1969 he staged a biographical play about Eva Perón. His theatrical works, influenced by Samuel Beckett, are characterized by the failure of characters to communicate.

Copi also collaborated with the avant-garde group Pánico, which included Fernando Arrabal, Roland Topor, and Alejandro Jodorowsky.

Copi contributed cartoons to the magazine Gai Pied.

He died of an AIDS-related illness in 1987, at the age of 48.

== Novels ==
- L'Uruguayen, Christian Bourgois, 1973
- Le bal des folles, Christian Bourgois, 1977
- Une langouste pour deux, Christian Bourgois, 1978
- La cité des rats, Belfond, 1979
- La vida es un tango, Anagrama, 1981 (his only finished novel in Spanish)
- La guerre des pédés, Albin Michel, 1982 (written in Spanish but unedited)
- Virginia Woolf a encore frappé, Persona, 1983
- L'Internationale argentine, Belfond, 1988

== Theater ==
- Un ángel para la señora Lisca, Buenos Aires, directed by Copi, 1962.
- Sainte Geneviève dans sa baignoire, Le Bilboquet, directed by Jorge Lavelli, 1966.
- L'alligator, le thé, International festival of UNEF, directed by Jérome Savary, 1966.
- La journée d'une rêveuse, Theater of Lutèce, directed by Jorge Lavelli, 1968.
- Eva Perón, Theater of l'Épée-de-Bois, directed by Alfredo Arias, 1970.
- L'homosexuel ou la difficulté de s'exprimer, City University Theater, directed by Jorge Lavelli, 1971. Spanish title: El homosexual, o la dificultad de expresarse.
- Les quatre jumelles, Le Palace, directed by Jorge Lavelli, 1973.
- Loretta Strong, Theater of the Gaïté Montparnasse, directed by Javier Botana, 1974.
- La Pyramide, Le Palace, directed by Copi, 1975.
- La coupe du monde, Le Sélénite, directed by Copi, 1975.
- L'ombre de Venceslao, Festival de la Rochelle, directed by Jérome Savary, 1978.
- La Tour de la Défense, Teatro Fontaine, directed by Claude Confortès, 1981.
- Le Frigo, Fontaine Theater, 1983.
- La nuit de Madame Lucienne, Avignon Festival, directed by Jorge Lavelli, 1985.
- Une visite inopportune, Théâtre de la Colline, directed by Jorge Lavelli, 1988.
- Les escaliers du Sacré-cœur, Aubervilliers Theater, directed by Alfredo Arias, 1990.
- Une visite inopportune Konex Theatre Buenos Aires, directed by Stephan Druet with Moria Casan, 2009

== Comics ==
- Le dernier salon où l'on cause, Ediciones de Square.
- Et moi, pourquoi j'ai pas de banane?, Ediciones de Square, 1975.
- Les vieilles putes, Editions du Square, 1977. Italian title: Storie puttanesche, Mondadori, Milan 1979.
- Le monde fantastique des gays 1986. Italian title: Il fantastico mondo dei gay... e delle loro mamme!, Glénat Italia, Milan 1987.
- La femme assise, Stock, 2002.
- Un livre blanc, Buchet-Castel, 2002. Italian title: Un libro bianco.
- Les poulets n'ont pas de chaises. Italian title: I polli non hanno sedie, Glénat Italia, 1988. ISBN 88-7811-015-9.

== Opera ==
- Les quatre jumelles, composed by Régis Campo, premièred in Nanterre, France, Jan. 2009
- Cachafaz, composed by Oscar Strasnoy, premièred in Quimper, France, Nov. 2010

== Other ==
- Copi, collected works edited by Jorge Damonte and Christian Bourgois, 1990.
- Copi au travers du "Queer" et le "Queer" au travers de Copi by Antony Hickling, Master 2 : Theatre studies for Paris 8 University Vincennes-Saint-Denis : under the direction of Professeur M. Claude Amey in 2007.
