= Konex Award =

Argentine cultural award granted by Konex Foundation

Konex Awards Premios Konex
- Awarded for: Excellence in various cultural disciplines
- Country: Argentina
- Presented by: Konex Foundation
- First award: November 6, 1980
- Website: Official website

Konex Foundation Awards, or simply Konex Awards, are cultural awards from the Konex Foundation honouring Argentine cultural personalities.

== History and purpose ==
Konex Awards are granted by the Konex Foundation, created in 1980 in Argentina. The purpose of the Foundation is to promote, stimulate, support and participate in any possible manner in cultural, educational, intellectual, artistic, social, philanthropic, scientific or sports initiatives, works and enterprises, in their most relevant aspects. To achieve its goals, the Foundation instituted the Konex Awards to be granted to personalities and institutions standing out for his, her or its achievements in any of the aforementioned fields. The Konex Awards were instituted in 1980 to be annually granted to sow for the future so that the most distinguished contemporary personalities and institutions in every field, which compose the cultural spectrum of the nation, will be an example to the nation's youths.

Every year the Konex Foundation offers those awards in different activities in the nation, in cycles that repeat themselves every ten years. Initially and in the ten-year span from 1980 to 1989, such personalities received awards for their life-time accomplishments. As from 1990 to 1999 the accomplishments to receive awards represented the last ten years of activity. From the year 2000 through 2009 such cycle is repeated, and it will be repeated indefinitely.

- 1980 1990 2000 2010 Sports
- 1981 1991 2001 2011 Entertainment
- 1982 1992 2002 2012 Visual Arts
- 1983 1993 2003 2013 Science and Technology
- 1984 1994 2004 2014 Literature
- 1985 1995 2005 2015 Popular Music
- 1986 1996 2006 2016 Humanities
- 1987 1997 2007 2017 Communication, Journalism
- 1988 1998 2008 2018 Institutions, Community, Enterprise
- 1989 1999 2009 2019 Classical Music

== Selection and awards ==
Every year a Grand Jury including 20 members is appointed. The members are specialists in the specific subjects receiving the award, and they appoint their own president. The members of the Jury exclude themselves from being chosen for a Konex Award; a gesture that the Foundation emphasizes and thanks very specially. Each year the activity receiving a prize is classified by the Grand Jury into 20 disciplines. The Grand Jury selects the recipients for the following awards:

- Konex Merit Diploma
- Platinum Konex
- Diamond Konex
- Honour Konex
- Mercosur Konex

The Grand Jury selects the five personalities or institutions that show the most remarkable accomplishments in each of the 20 chosen disciplines, awarding each of these 100 personalities or institutions a Merit Diploma in a public ceremony. Then the Grand Jury selects one figure out of the five awarded to receive the Platinum Konex. Among the 20 Platinum Konex winners, the Grand Jury selects the Diamond Konex recipient, the most outstanding personality or institution considered the most relevant figure of the activity. The Honour Konex is granted to an outstanding deceased personality. The Grand Jury also has the power to grant Special Mentions to those who are considered worthy of the award but do not specifically fit within given disciplines. Since 2002 the Grand Jury has the authority to grant the Mercosur Konex to the most relevant living personalities of the countries linked to Mercosur. All awards are presented in a final, special ceremony in which the recipients are granted a distinctive symbol called Konex Trophy.

The Konex Foundation further has the authority to grant the Konex Decoration to honor personalities who have brilliant careers around the world, for their contribution to universal culture. Thus far, two Konex Decorations have been granted: Yehudi Menuhin in 1994 and Mstislav Rostropovich in 2002.

== Related links ==
- Diamond, Honour and Mercosur Konex Award winners
