= Manuel Rojas Ibero-American Narrative Award =

Chilean prose award

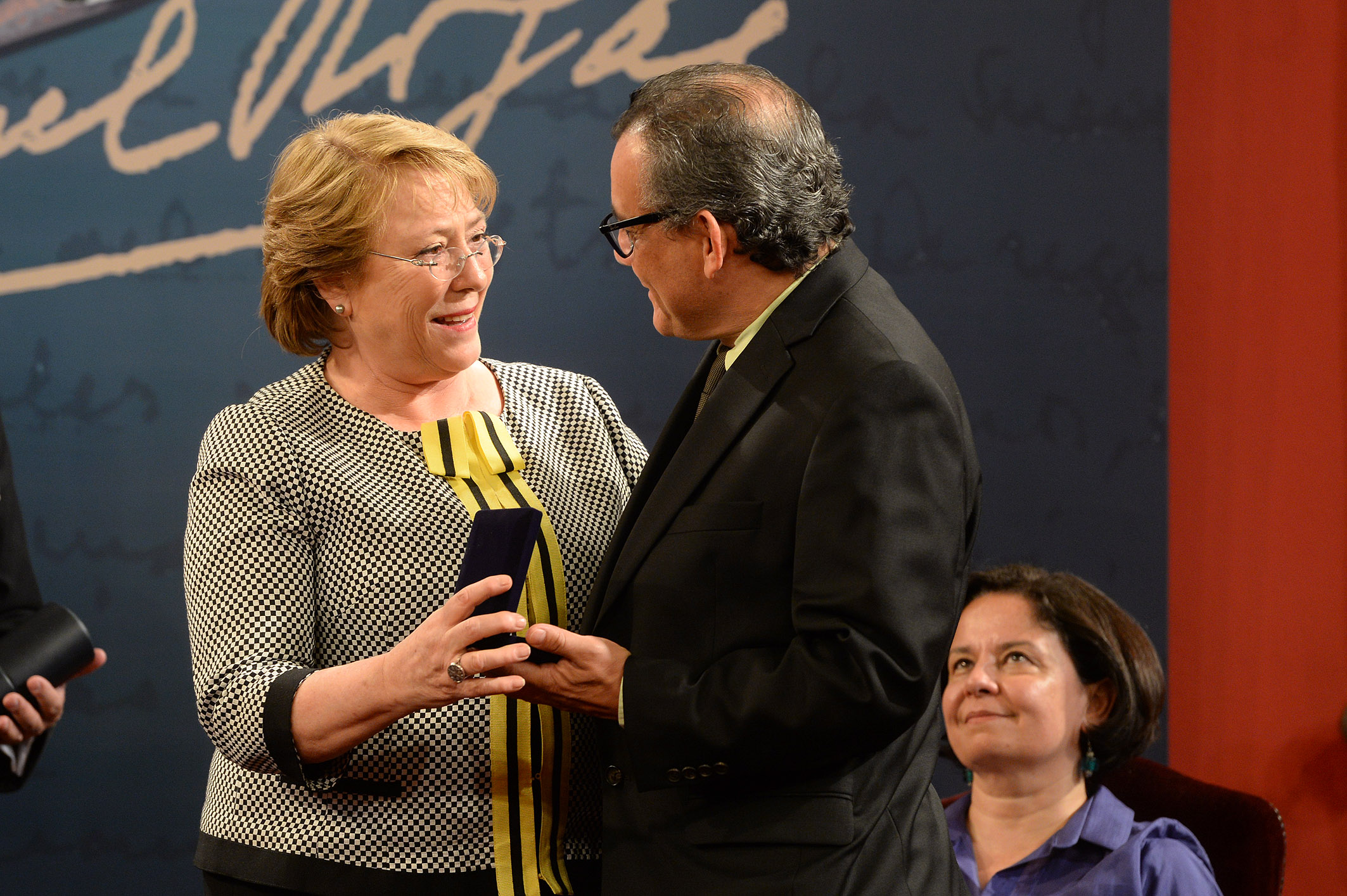
- Horacio Castellanos Moya receiving the award in 2014, at the hands of President Michelle Bachelet
- Sponsored by: National Council of Culture and the Arts
- Location: Santiago, Chile
- Reward: US$60,000
- First award: 2012

The Manuel Rojas Ibero-American Narrative Award (Spanish: Premio Iberoamericano de Narrativa Manuel Rojas) is an annual award given in honor of the author of Hijo de ladrón by the National Council of Culture and the Arts of Chile.

It was instituted in 2012 with the sponsorship of the Manuel Rojas Foundation and was delivered for the first time that year, on the centenary of the writer's foot crossing from Argentina, "at which time he began his vast literary career," as pointed out on the occasion by Jorge Guerra, president of the foundation. The winner is chosen by an international jury composed of five literary figures – two Chileans and three foreigners.

The prize consists of US$60,000, a medal, and a diploma, similar to that of the Pablo Neruda Ibero-American Poetry Award.

== Winners ==
Year	Winner	Photo	Ref.
2012	Rubem Fonseca		
2013	Ricardo Piglia		
2014	Horacio Castellanos Moya		
2015	Margo Glantz		
2016	César Aira		
2017	Hebe Uhart		
2018	Juan Villoro		
2019	María Moreno		
2021	Mempo Giardinelli		
2023	Alejandro Zambra		
2025	Tomás González		
