= Natalio Botana =

Uruguayan journalist

Natalio Félix Botana
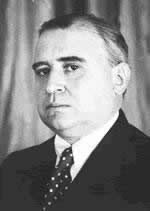
- Born: Natalio Félix Botana Miralles; September 8, 1888; Sarandí del Yí, Uruguay
- Died: August 7, 1941 (aged 52); Jujuy, Argentina
- Occupation: Media entrepreneur
- Years active: 1913–1941
- Notable work: Crítica newspaper

Natalio Félix Botana Miralles (Sarandí del Yí, September 8, 1888 – San Salvador de Jujuy, August 7, 1941), was an Uruguayan journalist and entrepreneur who founded the Argentine newspaper Crítica in 1913. Published until 1962, Crítica was the most widely circulated newspaper in Latin America.

Botana was a pioneer of sensationalist media in Argentina, and is considered one of the most influential personalities of the 20th century in that country.

He also presided over the Argentine Football Association during a brief period in 1926.

== Biography ==
Botana was born into a family of landowners whose commercial activities were often affected by continued political wars that erupted between the country's political parties: White and Colorados.

When Botana arrived in Buenos Aires in 1911, he started to work in different newspapers until he was hired by La Razón, the main evening paper that sold 76,000 copies at the time. Two years later, at the age of 25, he founded his own newspaper, Crítica, which was a pioneer in the Argentine media with its sensationalist style. Crítica had also a wide coverage of news on the crime, focusing on information rather than opinion.

Crìtica became a huge success, reaching its peak in the 1920s and 1930s, where increased its daily circulation from 9,000 to 30,000 copies. The newspaper then added a new edition and two supplements, one covering sports and another covering culture, named Crítica Magazine. Among the contributing writers were Raúl González Tuñón, Roberto Arlt, Jorge Luis Borges, Enrique González Tuñón, Carlos de la Púa, and Bernardo Verbitsky.

The basement of his house in Don Torcuato, a Buenos Aires suburb served in 1933 as the site for Plastic Exercise by exiled Mexican muralist David Alfaro Siqueiros.

Botana died in a car accident in 1941.

== Personal life ==
Botana was married to the writer Salvadora Medina Onrubia, and his daughter Georgina was the mother of comedian and writer Raúl Damonte Botana, known by the pseudonym of Copi, who was a successful artist in France with his strip La femme assise (the sixth woman), published during ten years on Le Nouvel Observateur.

His nephew is the famous political scientist Natalio R. Botana, who has written articles for La Nación.

== Literary references ==
- Leopoldo Marechal, in his novel Adán Buenosayres, condemned Botana to live in the seven circle of hell, describing him as the absolute boss of a giant rotary machine whose rolls devore and smash men until turning them into paper. The novel also shows Botana confessing how he realised a match box contained one less unit than described on the packaging. After discovering that, he threatened the manufacturer to reveal it on the front page of Crítica. As a result, the owner of the factory paid a fortune to avoid that to be published.
- In his biography Confieso que he vivido, Chilean poet Pablo Neruda tells an adventure which happened at the Botana's weekend house at Don Torcuato.
- Argentine writer Ariel Magnus in El que mueve las piezas, tells a war novel where Botana lives with his grandfather.
- Spanish writer Elena Fortún (who had met Botana during her exile in Buenos Aires) inspired on Botana to the character "the doctor" of her book Celia Institutriz en América, published in 1944.

== See also ==
- Crítica de la Argentina
