= Héctor Lastra =

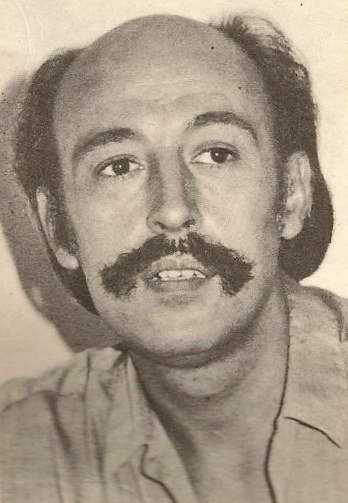
- Born: 1943
- Died: July 16, 2006 (aged 62–63)

Héctor Lastra (Buenos Aires, Argentina, 1943 – July 16, 2006) was a writer from Argentina.

== Works ==
- Cuentos de mármol y hollín (short stories, 1965)
- De tierra y escapularios (short stories, 1969)
- La boca de la ballena (novel, 1973)
- Fredi (novel, 1996)
