= El derecho de matar =

1933 novel by Raúl Barón Biza

- Cover Page of the First Issue
- Author: Raúl Barón Biza
- Illustrator: Teodoro Piotti
- Language: Spanish
- Genre: Novel
- Published: 1933
- Publication place: Argentina

El derecho de matar ("The Right To Kill") is an Argentine novel by Raúl Barón Biza. It was first published in 1933, however the first edition of the book was sequestered by the Argentine government, and thus was largely not available to the public until its second printing in 1935. It is the author's most famous book.

== Plot and style ==
El Derecho de Matar tells the story of Jorge Morganti, his sister Irma and his lover Cleo. It is a "pornographic-philosophic" novel, in the tradition of Marqués de Sade. Artificiality and exoticism weave a narrative skewed by philosophical and moral reflections that oscillate between traditional eroticism and a new style developed by the acute sensibility of Barón Biza.

== Publishing history ==
In late November 1933 the first edition of “El Derecho de Matar” was announced. The book's presentation was luxurious: 5,000 copies printed on the highest-quality paper, with silver-plated covers. The front cover showed a skull and a scythe, and the back cover an inverted cross over a puddle of blood, created - along with other interior illustrations - by artist Teodoro Piotti. The author had a copy sent to the Vatican, mocking the Pope with his accompanying letter: "So that your doormen will let it through, so that it may attract your attention, so that it will be a bright note of relevance in the sad hall of your dark library; I have plated its covers in silver". Almost immediately, the military government of Argentina ordered the sequestering of the entire edition, and persecuted Barón Biza for obscenity. Barón Biza, at the time already imprisoned for participating in a revolutionary strike, had this to say about the government's censorship:

While I was imprisoned, having finished the printing of my last book “El Derecho de Matar”, a thesis novel in favor of the oppressed and the disinherited, posters announced its appearance in Buenos Aires. The bourgeois press immediately attacked the title of the book, criticizing it before its release, which demonstrated to me that the full and the satiated, with just conscience, were given as future victims of such a right. The government immediately made its fear known by sequestering at the very printing house the 5,000 copies of the first edition. Regardless, “El Derecho de Matar” will be reprinted and given to the public.

— Raúl Barón Biza

Defended by Néstor Aparicio, Barón Biza later achieved absolution for his work, although he remained imprisoned for political reasons.

Early in 1935 a second edition was printed. This edition was much more rustic in presentation, since Barón Biza wanted the novel to be accessible to the working class. The new cover again showed a skull and scythe, but with new art by Carosselli. Equivalents of almost all of the original illustrations by Teodoro Piotti appeared, again re-illustrated by Carosselli. On the back cover was a woman with red hair, with bulging eyes and a furious expression.
