= Reina Roffé =

Argentine writer (born 1951)

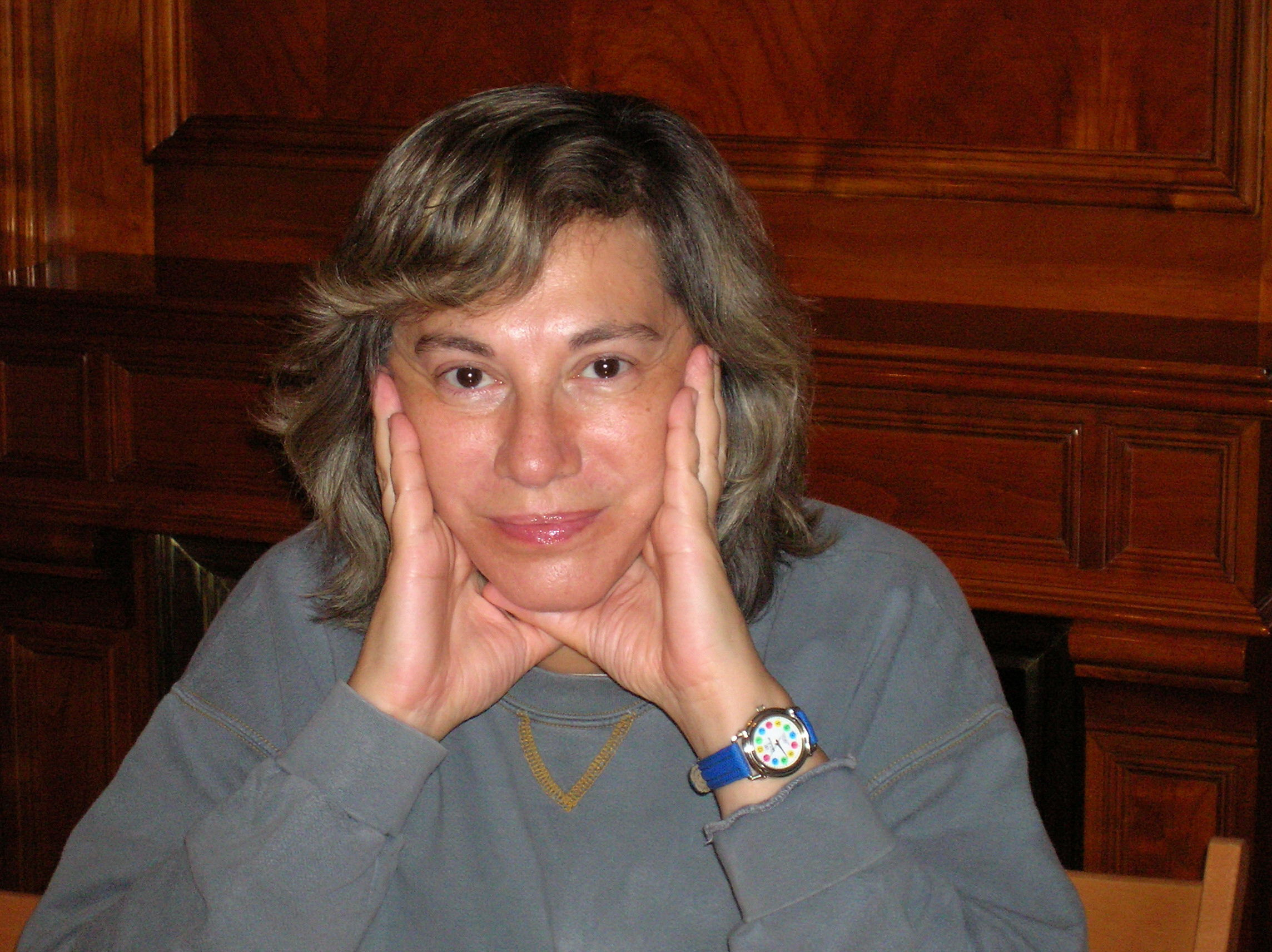
Reina Roffe in 2006

Reina Roffé (born 4 November 1951) is an Argentine writer.

== Awards ==
- “Premio Pondal Ríos al mejor libro de autor joven” for Llamado al Puf. Premio Bienal otorgado por la Fundación Odol de Buenos Aires, 1975
- “Premio Bienal Internacional de Novela Breve para obras en castellano” for La rompiente, Municipalidad de Córdoba, Argentina, 1986.
- “Beca Fulbright para escritores”, International Writing Program, University of Iowa, USA, 1981.
- “Beca Antorchas de Literatura”, Fundación Antorchas, Buenos Aires, 1993.

== Works ==
=== Novels ===
- Llamado al Puf (1973), Pleamar, Buenos Aires.
- Monte de Venus (1976), Corregidor, Buenos Aires.
- La rompiente (1987), Puntosur, Buenos Aires, y Editorial Universitaria de Veracruz.
- El cielo dividido (1996), Sudamericana, Buenos Aires.

=== Short stories ===
- Aves exóticas. Cinco cuentos con mujeres raras. Editorial Leviatán, Buenos Aires, Argentina, 2004.
- Vivir entre extraños. Relatos de soledad y desarraigo. Hugo Benjamín, Buenos Aires, 2024.

=== Essays, biographies, and interviews ===
- Juan Rulfo: autobiografía armada (1973, essay), Corregidor, Buenos Aires. Reeditado por Editorial Montesinos, Barcelona, en 1992.
- Espejo de escritores (interviews) (1984). Ediciones del Norte, New Hampshire.
- Conversaciones americanas (interviews), Editorial Páginas de Espuma, Madrid, España, 2001.
- Juan Rulfo. Las mañas del zorro (biography). Editorial Espasa-Calpe, Madrid, España, 2003. Another edition:

Mil Botellas, La Plata, Argentina, 2023.

- Juan Rulfo. Biografía no autorizada. Fórcola, Madrid, 2012. Another edition:

Fórcola, Madrid, 2017.

- Voces íntimas. Entrevistas con autores latinoamericanos del siglo XX (interviews). Punto de vista editores, Madrid, 2021.

=== Works in translation ===
- “Apokalypse Arlt. Das Vermächtnis” (“Apocalipsis Artl. El legado”), essay. In: Moderne in den Metropolen. Roberto Arlt und Alfred Döblin (Internationales Symposium, Buenos Aires-Berlín, 2004), edited by Marily Martínez de Richter, Königshausen & Neumann, Würzburg, Germany, 2007.
- ”Exotic Birds” (“Aves exóticas”), short story. In: The House of Memory. Stories by Jewish Women Writers of Latin America, antología. Edited by Marjorie Agosín, The Feminist Press, New York, USA, 1999.
- “Exotische Vögel” (“Aves exóticas”), short story. Revista Xicóatl, Salzburgo, Austria, año VIII /número 43, 1999.
- “Zugvogel” (“Ave de paso”), short story. Revista Xicóatl, Salzburg, Austria, año V/número 23/1996.
- “Eine Stadt in Grau und Beige” (“Una ciudad gris y beige”), short story. In: Erkundungen. 21 Erzähler vom Río de la Plata, antología. Edited by Casa de las Culturas del Mundo de Berlín, Verlag Volk und Welt, Berlin, Germany, 1993.
- “Flut” (“Alta marea”), short story. In: Fallen die Perlen vom Mond?, antology. Edited by Mempo Giardinelli and Wolfgang Eitel, Editorial Piper, Munich, Germany, 1991.
- “Revelations” (“Revelaciones”), short story. In: Revista Present Tense, New York, USA, Spring 1985.
- “High Tide” (“Alta marea”), short story. In: Writing from the World, antology, The International Writing Program 1977-1983. The Iowa Review, Iowa, USA, volumen 14/número 2/1984.
- “Let’s Hear What He Has To Say” (“Oigamos lo que tiene que decir”), short story. In: The Web. Stories by Argentine Women, antology. Edited by H. Ernest Lewald, Three Continents Press, Washington D. C., USA, 1983.
- Uccelli rari ed esotici. Cinque racconti di donne straordinarie (Aves Exóticas. Cinco cuentos con mujeres raras), Alberobello, Italy, Poiesis Editrice 2010.
- L'onda che si infrange (La Rompiente), Alberobello, Italy, Poiesis Editrice 2010.
- The Reef and Exotic Birds: Five Stories with Rare Women (La rompiente y Aves exóticas. Cinco cuentos con mujeres raras), University Press of the South, New Orleans, USA, 2010.
- L’altro amore di Federico García Lorca a Buenos Aires, Poiesis editrice, Alberobello, Italy, 2016.
- Oiseaux exotiques. Six histoires de femmes bizarres. Incluye La mère de Mary Shelley (La madre de Mary Shelley, nouvelle). Editorial L’ Harmattan, Paris, France, 2023.
