= Salvadora Medina Onrubia =

Argentine storyteller, poet, anarchist and feminist

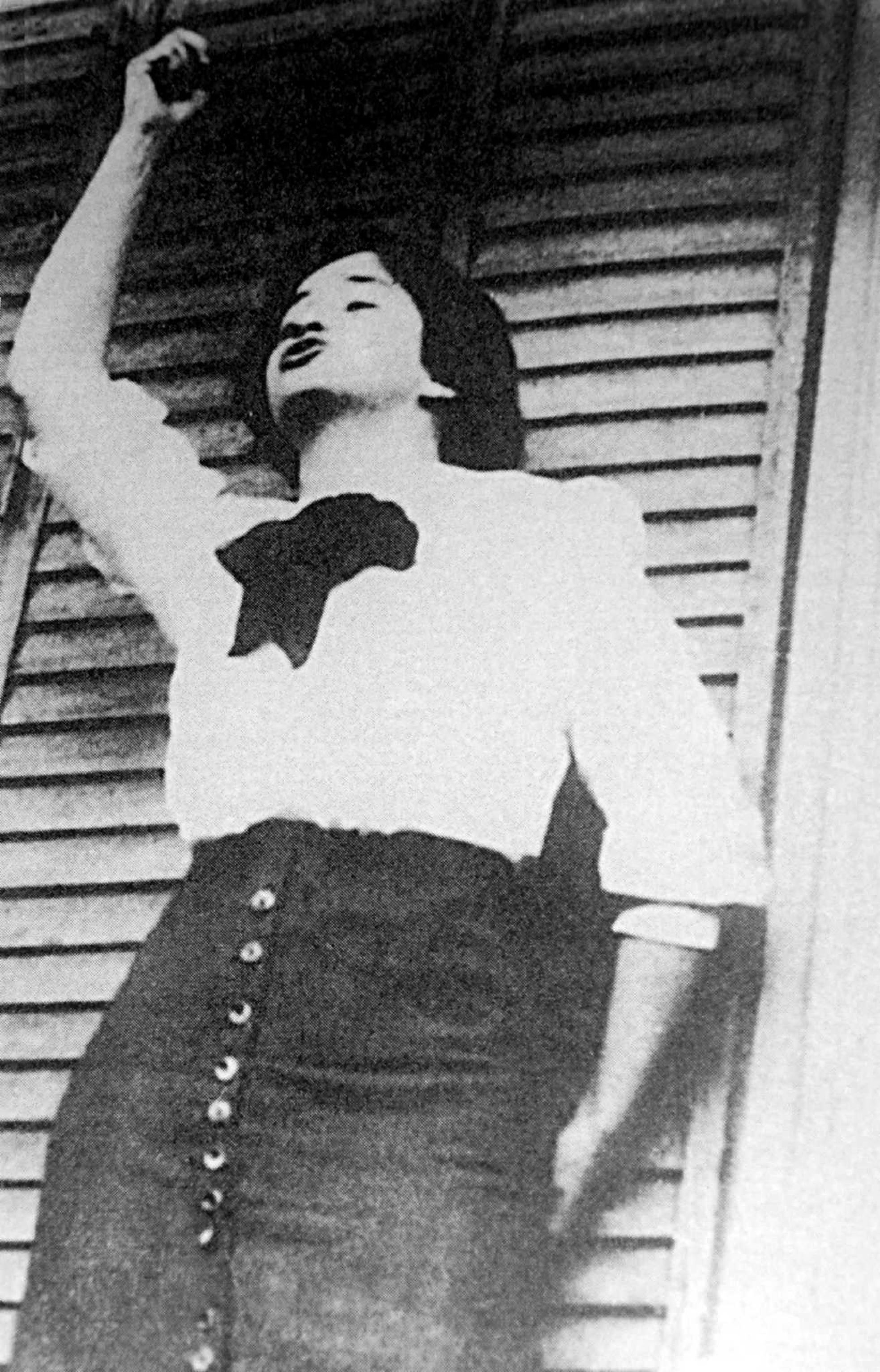
Salvadora Medina Onrubia (after 1915)

Salvadora Medina Onrubia (pen name: Dr. Brea; 23 March 1894 – 21 July 1972) was an Argentine storyteller, poet, anarchist and feminist.

== Biography ==
Salvadora Medina Onrubia was born on 23 March 1894, in La Plata, Buenos Aires Province. At the age of 15, she embraced the cause of the young anarchist from Russia, Simón Radowitzky, and began a friendship with him by correspondence.

In February 1912, a month before Medina's 18th birthday, her first child, Carlos "Pitón", was born. In 1913, she began her literary activity in Gualeguay and in the Buenos Aires media, including in the magazine Fray Mocho. In the middle of that year, she moved from Entre Ríos to the City of Buenos Aires and began working for the anarchist newspaper, La Protesta. Soon after, she met Natalio Botana, a young journalist who collaborated with the magazine P.B.T. Natalio gave his surname to Salvadora's son, and together they had three more children: Helvio Ildefonso, Jaime Alberto and Georgina Nicolasa. In 1919, Medina married Botana after the birth of her youngest daughter. Botana had established the newspaper Crítica, which Medina directed between 1946 and 1951 after her husband's death.

She was a contributor to La Protesta, Fray Mocho, and the newspaper, Crítica. In this publication, she wrote under the pseudonym "Dr. Brea". She was the author of several dramatic pieces, such as Almafuerte, La solución (The solution), Las decentradas, and Un hombre y su vida (A man and his life). Her books of poetry include El misal de mi yoga (The Missal of My Yoga) and La rueca milagrosa (The Miraculous Spinning Wheel). She was the author of a single novel, Akasha and two books of short stories, El libro humilde y doliente (The humble and suffering book) and El vaso intacto y otros cuentos (The intact glass and other stories). Medina was a promoter of children's theatre for children.

Medina died on 21 July 1972, in Buenos Aires, leaving behind an unpublished book, Los mil claveles colorados (A thousand red carnations). The book was edited together with ¡Arroja la bomba! Salvadora Medina Onrubia y el feminismo anarco, by Vanina Escales.

== Selected works ==
- Almafuerte
- La solución
- Las decentradas
- Un hombre y su vida
- El misal de mi yoga
- La rueca milagrosa
- Akasha
- El libro humilde y doliente
- El vaso intacto y otros cuentos
