= International Literature Award =

German literary award

International Literature Award (German: Internationaler Literaturpreis – Haus der Kulturen der Welt)
- Type: Literary award
- Awarded for: An outstanding work of contemporary international literature and its first translation into German.
- Country: Germany
- Website: www.hkw.de/en/programme/internationaler-literaturpreis

International Literature Award (German: Internationaler Literaturpreis – Haus der Kulturen der Welt) is a German literary award for international prose translated into German for the first time. The prize has been awarded annually by the Haus der Kulturen der Welt and the foundation “Elementarteilchen” since 2009. Winning authors receive €20,000 and the translators €15,000. The award has compared as the German near-equivalent of the Best Translated Book Award or Independent Foreign Fiction Prize. In 2020, due to COVID-19 pandemic, the award was given to all six shortlisted titles, with the prize money divided equally.

== Winners and shortlists ==
Year	Author	Original title (English title)	German title	Language	Translator	Notes
2009	Daniel Alarcón	Lost City Radio		English	Friederike Meltendorf	
2009	Mahmoud Dowlatabadi	زوال کلنل (The Colonel)	Der Colonel	Persian	Bahman Nirumand	
2009	Rawi Hage	De Niro's Game	Als ob es kein Morgen gäbe	English	Gregor Hens	
2009	Martín Kohan	Dos veces junio	Zweimal Juni	Spanish	Peter Kultzen	
2009	Dinaw Mengestu	The Beautiful Things That Heaven Bears	Zum Wiedersehen der Sterne	English	Volker Oldenburg	
2010	Marie NDiaye	Trois femmes puissantes (Three Strong Women)	Drei starke Frauen	French	Claudia Kalscheuer	
2010	Édouard Glissant	La terre magnétique: Les errances de Rapa Nui, l'île de Pâques	Das magnetische Land: Die Irrfahrt der Osterinsel Rapa Nui	French	Beate Thill	
2010	Yasmina Khadra	Ce que le jour doit à la nuit (What the Day Owes the Night)	Die Schuld des Tages an die Nacht	French	Regina Keil-Sagawe	
2010	Yiyun Li	The Vagrants	Die Sterblichen	English	Anette Grube	
2010	Shahriar Mandanipour	Censoring an Iranian Love Story	Eine iranische Liebesgeschichte zensieren	English	Ursula Ballin	
2010	Dinaw Mengestu	How to Read the Air	Die Melodie der Luft	English	Volker Oldenbur	
2010	Daniyal Mueenuddin	In Other Rooms, Other Wonders	Andere Räume, andere Träume	English	Brigitte Heinrich	
2011	Mikhail Shishkin	Венерин Волос (Maidenhair)	Venushaar	Russian	Andreas Tretner	
2011	José Eduardo Agualusa	Barroco Tropical		Portuguese	Michael Kegler	
2011	Joanna Bator	Piaskowa Góra	Sandberg	Polish	Esther Kinsky	
2011	Edwidge Danticat	The Dew Breaker	Der verlorene Vater	English	Susann Urban	
2011	Mathias Énard	Zone (Zone)		French	Holger Fock, Sabine Müller	
2011	Elias Khoury	يالو (Yalo)	Yalo	Arabic	Leila Chammaa	
2012	Mircea Cărtărescu	Orbitor: Corpul	Der Körper	Romanian	Gerhardt Csejka, Ferdinand Leopold	
2012	Jaume Cabré	Jo confesso	Das Schweigen des Sammlers	Catalan	Kirsten Brandt, Petra Zickmann	
2012	Nedim Gürsel	Allah'ın Kızları	Allahs Töchter	Turkish	Barbara Yurtdaş	
2012	Tom McCarthy	C	K	English	Bernhard Robben	
2012	Péter Nádas	Párhuzamos történetek (Parallel Stories)	Parallelgeschichten	Hungarian	Christina Viragh	
2012	Téa Obreht	The Tiger's Wife	Die Tigerfrau	English	Bettina Abarbanell	
2013	Teju Cole	Open City		English	Christine Richter-Nilsson	
2013	Andrei Bitov	Преподаватель симметрии (The Symmetry Teacher)	Der Symmetrielehrer	Russian	Rosemarie Tietze	
2013	Lloyd Jones	Hand Me Down World	Die Frau im Blauen Mantel	English	Grete Osterwald	
2013	Valeria Luiselli	Los ingrávidos (Faces in the Crowd)	Die Schwerelosen	Spanish	Dagmar Ploetz-Timm	
2013	Zakhar Prilepin	Санькя (Sankya)	Sankya	Russian	Erich Klein, Susanne Macht	
2013	Jean Rolin	Un chien mort après lui	Einen toten Hund ihm nach	French	Holger Fock, Sabine Müller	
2014	Dany Laferrière	L'énigme du retour (The Enigma of the Return)	Das Rätsel der Rückkehr	French	Beate Thill	
2014	Zsófia Bán	Amikor még csak az állatok éltek	Als nur die Tiere lebten	Hungarian	Terézia Mora	
2014	Georgi Gospodinov	Физика на тъгата (The Physics of Sorrow)	Physik der Schwermut	Bulgarian	Alexander Sitzmann	
2014	Mohsin Hamid	How to Get Filthy Rich in Rising Asia	So wirst du stinkreich im boomenden Asien	English	Eike Schönfeld	
2014	Bernardo Kucinski	K. (K)	K. oder Die verschwundene Tochter	Portuguese	Sarita Brandt	
2014	Madeleine Thien	Dogs at the Perimeter	Flüchtige Seelen	English	Almuth Carstens	
2015	Amos Oz	הבשורה על-פי יהודה (Judas)	Judas	Hebrew	Mirjam Pressler	
2015	NoViolet Bulawayo	We Need New Names	Wir brauchen neue Namen	English	Miriam Mandelkow	
2015	Patrick Chamoiseau	L'empreinte à Crusoé (Crusoe's Footprint)	Die Spur des Anderen	French	Beate Thill	
2015	Daša Drndić	Sonnenschein (Trieste)		Croatian	Brigitte Döbert, Blanka Stipetić	
2015	Gilbert Gatore	Le Passé devant soi (The Past Ahead)	Das lärmende Schweigen	French	Katja Meintel	
2015	Krisztina Tóth	Akvárium	Aquarium	Hungarian	György Buda	
2016	Shumona Sinha	Assommons les pauvres ! (Down with the Poor!)	Erschlagt die Armen!	French	Lena Müller	
2016	Johannes Anyuru	En storm kom från paradiset (A Storm Blew in from Paradise)	Ein Sturm wehte vom Paradiese her	Swedish	Paul Berf	
2016	Joanna Bator	Ciemno, prawie noc	Dunkel, fast Nacht	Polish	Lisa Palmes	
2016	Aleksandr Ilichevsky	Перс	Der Perser	Russian	Andreas Tretner	
2016	Valeria Luiselli	La historia de mis dientes (The Story of My Teeth)	Die Geschichte meiner Zähne	Spanish	Dagmar Ploetz	
2016	Ivan Vladislavić	Double Negative		English	Thomas Brückner	
2017	Fiston Mwanza Mujila	Tram 83 (Tram 83)		French	Katharina Meyer, Lena Müller	
2017	Hamed Abboud	الموت يصنع كعكة عيد الميلاد	Der Tod backt einen Geburtstagskuchen	Arabic	Larissa Bender	
2017	Alberto Barrera Tyszka	Patria o muerte (The Last Days of El Comandante)	Die letzten Tage des Comandante	Spanish	Matthias Strobel	
2017	Han Kang	채식주의자 (The Vegetarian)	Die Vegetarierin	Korean	Ki-Hyang Lee	
2017	Amanda Lee Koe	Ministry of Moral Panic	Ministerium für öffentliche Erregung	English	Zoë Beck	
2017	Ziemowit Szczerek	Przyjdzie Mordor i nas zje, czyli tajna historia Słowian	Mordor kommt und frisst uns auf	Polish	Thomas Weiler	
2018	Ivana Sajko	Ljubavni roman (Love Novel)	Liebesroman	Croatian	Alida Bremer	
2018	Anuk Arudpragasam	The Story of a Brief Marriage	Die Geschichte einer kurzen Ehe	English	Hannes Meyer	
2018	Virginie Despentes	Vernon Subutex (Vernon Subutex)	Das Leben des Vernon Subutex	French	Claudia Steinitz	
2018	Maxim Osipov	—N/a	Nach der Ewigkeit	Russian	Birgit Veit	
2018	Éric Vuillard	L'ordre du jour (The Order of the Day)	Die Tagesordnung	French	Nicola Denis	
2018	Eliot Weinberger	The Ghosts of Birds	Vogelgeister	English	Beatrice Faßbender	
2019	Fernanda Melchor	Temporada de huracanes (Hurricane Season)	Saison der Wirbelstürme	Spanish	Angelica Ammar	
2019	Hélène Cixous	Homère est morte... (Mother Homer Is Dead...)	Meine Homère ist tot...	French	Claudia Simma	
2019	Zoltán Danyi	A dögeltakarító	Der Kadaverräumer	Hungarian	Terézia Mora	
2019	Ariana Harwicz	Matate, amor (Die, My Love)	Stirb doch, Liebling	Spanish	Dagmar Ploetz	
2019	Gerald Murnane	Border Districts	Grenzbezirke	English	Rainer G. Schmidt	
2019	Yishai Sarid	מפלצת הזיכרון (The Memory Monster)	Monster	Hebrew	Ruth Achlama	
2020	Yevgenia Belorusets	Щасливі падіння (Lucky Breaks)	Glückliche Fälle	Ukrainian, Russian	Claudia Dathe	
2020	Amir Hassan Cheheltan	محفلِ عاشقان ادب	Der Zirkel der Literaturliebhaber	Persian	Jutta Himmelreich	
2020	Angel Igov	Кротките	Die Sanftmütigen	Bulgarian	Andreas Tretner	
2020	James Noël	Belle merveille	Was für ein Wunder	French	Rike Bolte	
2020	Chigozie Obioma	An Orchestra of Minorities	Das Weinen der Vögel	English	Nicolai von Schweder-Schreiner	
2020	Isabel Waidner	Gaudy Bauble	Geile Deko	English	Ann Cotten	
2021	Fatima Daas	La Petite Dernière (The Last One)	Die jüngste Tochter	French	Sina de Malafosse	
2021	Jonas Eika	Efter solen (After the Sun)	Nach der Sonne	Danish	Ursel Allenstein	
2021	Fang Fang	软埋 (Soft Burial)	Weiches Begräbnis	Mandarin	Michael Kahn-Ackermann	
2021	Ava Farmehri	Through the Sad Wood Our Corpses Will Hang	Im düstern Wald werden unsre Leiber hängen	English	Sonja Finck	
2021	Nastassja Martin	Croire aux fauves (In the Eye of the Wild)	An das Wilde glauben	French	Claudia Kalscheuer	
2021	Jenny Offill	Weather	Wetter	English	Melanie Walz	
2022	Cristina Morales	Lectura fácil (Easy Reading)	Leichte Sprache	Spanish	Friederike von Criegern	
2022	Can Xue	新世纪爱情故事 (Love in the New Millennium)	Liebe im neuen Jahrtausend	Mandarin	Karin Betz	
2022	Aleksandar Hemon	My Parents: An Introduction / This Does Not Belong to You	Meine Eltern / Alles nicht dein Eigen	English	Henning Ahrens	
2022	Juhani Karila	Pienen hauen pyydystys (Fishing for the Little Pike)	Der Fluch des Hechts	Finnish	Maximilian Murmann	
2022	Adania Shibli	تفصيل ثانوي (Minor Detail)	Eine Nebensache	Arabic	Günther Orth	
2022	Andrea Tompa	Omerta: Hallgatások könyve (Omertà: A Book of Silences)	Omertà: Buch des Schweigens	Hungarian	Terézia Mora	
2023	Mohamed Mbougar Sarr	La plus secrète mémoire des hommes (The Most Secret Memory of Men)	Die geheimste Erinnerung der Menschen	French	Holger Fock, Sabine Müller	
2023	Don Mee Choi	DMZ Colony	DMZ Kolonie	English	Uljana Wolf	
2023	Verónica Gerber Bicecci	Conjunto vacío (Empty Set)	Leere Menge	Spanish	Birgit Weilguny	
2023	Cherie Jones	How the One-Armed Sister Sweeps Her House	Wie die einarmige Schwester das Haus fegt	English	Karen Gerwig	
2023	Péter Nádas	Rémtörténetek	Schauergeschichten	Hungarian	Heinrich Eisterer	
2023	Mariette Navarro	Ultramarins (Ultramarine)	Über die See	French	Sophie Beese	
2023	Maria Stepanova	Девушки без одежды	Mädchen ohne Kleider	Russian	Olga Radetzkaja	
2023	Eva Viezhnaviets	Па што ідзеш, воўча?	Was suchst du, Wolf?	Belarusian	Tina Wünschmann	
2024	Pajtim Statovci	Kissani Jugoslavia (My Cat Yugoslavia)	Meine Katze Jugoslawien	Finnish	Stefan Moster	
2024	Percival Everett	James		English	Nikolaus Stingl	
2024	Victoria Kielland	Mine menn (My Men)	Meine Männer	Norwegian	Elke Ranzinger	
2024	Scholastique Mukasonga	Kibogo est monté au ciel (Kibogo)	Kibogos Himmelfahrt	French	Jan Schönherr	
2024	Adèle Rosenfeld	Les méduses n'ont pas d'oreilles (Jellyfish Have No Ears)	Quallen haben keine Ohren	French	Nicola Denis	
2024	Juan Gabriel Vásquez	Volver la vista atrás (Retrospective)	Wenn es an Licht fehlt	Spanish	Susanne Lange	
2025	Kim Hyesoon	죽음의 자서전 (Autobiography of Death)	Autobiographie des Todes	Korean	Sool Park, Uljana Wolf	
2025	Doğan Akhanlı	Sankofa		Turkish	Recai Hallaç	
2025	Anna Melikova	Я тону в ускользающем озере	Ich ertrinke in einem fliehenden See	Russian	Christiane Pöhlmann	
2025	Scholastique Mukasonga	Study for Obedience	Übung in Gehorsam	English	Beatrice Faßbender	
2025	Neige Sinno	Triste tigre (Sad Tiger)	Trauriger Tiger	French	Michaela Meßner	
2025	Jesmyn Ward	Let Us Descend	So gehn wir denn hinab	English	Ulrike Becker	
2026	András Visky	Kitelepítés (Forced Displacement)	Die Aussiedlung	Hungarian	Timea Tankó	
2026	Julia Cimafiejeva	Кровазварот	Blutkreislauf	Belarusian	Tina Wünschmann	
2026	Safae el Khannoussi	Oroppa		Dutch	Stefanie Ochel	
2026	Stella Gaitano	رواح إدو (Edo’s Souls)	Eddos Goldenes Lächeln	Arabic	Larissa Bender	
2026	V. V. Ganeshananthan	Brotherless Night	Der brennende Garten	English	Sophie Zeitz	
2026	Bahram Moradi	سنگینی دیگران (The Weight Of Others)	Das Gewicht der anderen	Farsi	Sarah Rauchfuß	
