= Paradais =

2022 novel by Fernanda Melchor

- First edition cover
- Author: Fernanda Melchor
- Original title: Páradais
- Translator: Sophie Hughes
- Language: Spanish
- Publisher: Literatura Random House
- Publication date: 2 February 2021
- Publication place: Mexico
- English publication date: 23 March 2022
- Media type: Print (paperback)
- Pages: 200
- ISBN: 978-607-31-8797-8
- OCLC: 1179050066
- Dewey Decimal: 863/.7

Paradais (originally titled Páradais in Spanish) is a novel by Mexican author Fernanda Melchor. It was published in its original Spanish in 2021 by Literatura Random House. An English translation by Sophie Hughes was published in 2022 by Fitzcarraldo Editions and New Direction Publishing.

Benjamin P. Russell of the Houston Chronicle described the novel as a "commentary on" the "often haunting facts" of Mexico, stating "a more incisive commentary [...] would be hard to find."

This was the second Melchor novel to receive an officially published English translation.

== Contents ==
The setting is the gated community Paradais, located in the city of Progreso, Yucatán. The novel is about a teenage duo, Franco Andrade and Leopoldo "Polo" García Chaparro, who do criminal activity together.

== Characters ==
Franco, who lives in Paradais, has the nickname "fatboy". Franco is from a wealthy family, has little social success. Franco wants to have intercourse but has not found a willing female partner. Gabriella Martin of Harvard Review wrote that Franco is "Exhibiting all the qualities of a classic “incel,”[...]" Franco's father is a lawyer. Franco has a sexual obsession with Señora Marián.

Polo is from a low socioeconomic background and works at Paradais by gardening. Polo, who did not graduate from senior high school, is 16 years old. Justin Torres of The New York Times compared Polo to Bigger Thomas.

Señora Marián is married to a television host and has two children. She lives adjacent to Franco.

== Reception ==
Justin Torres of The New York Times stated that the work is "seductive" despite the "unbroken wall of text" that makes a "visual effect", and he praised the work of the translator for showing "vitality of the prose". The English translation of the novel was longlisted for the 2022 International Booker Prize.

== See also ==
- Hurricane Season - A novel by Melchor
