= Brenda Navarro =

Mexican writer

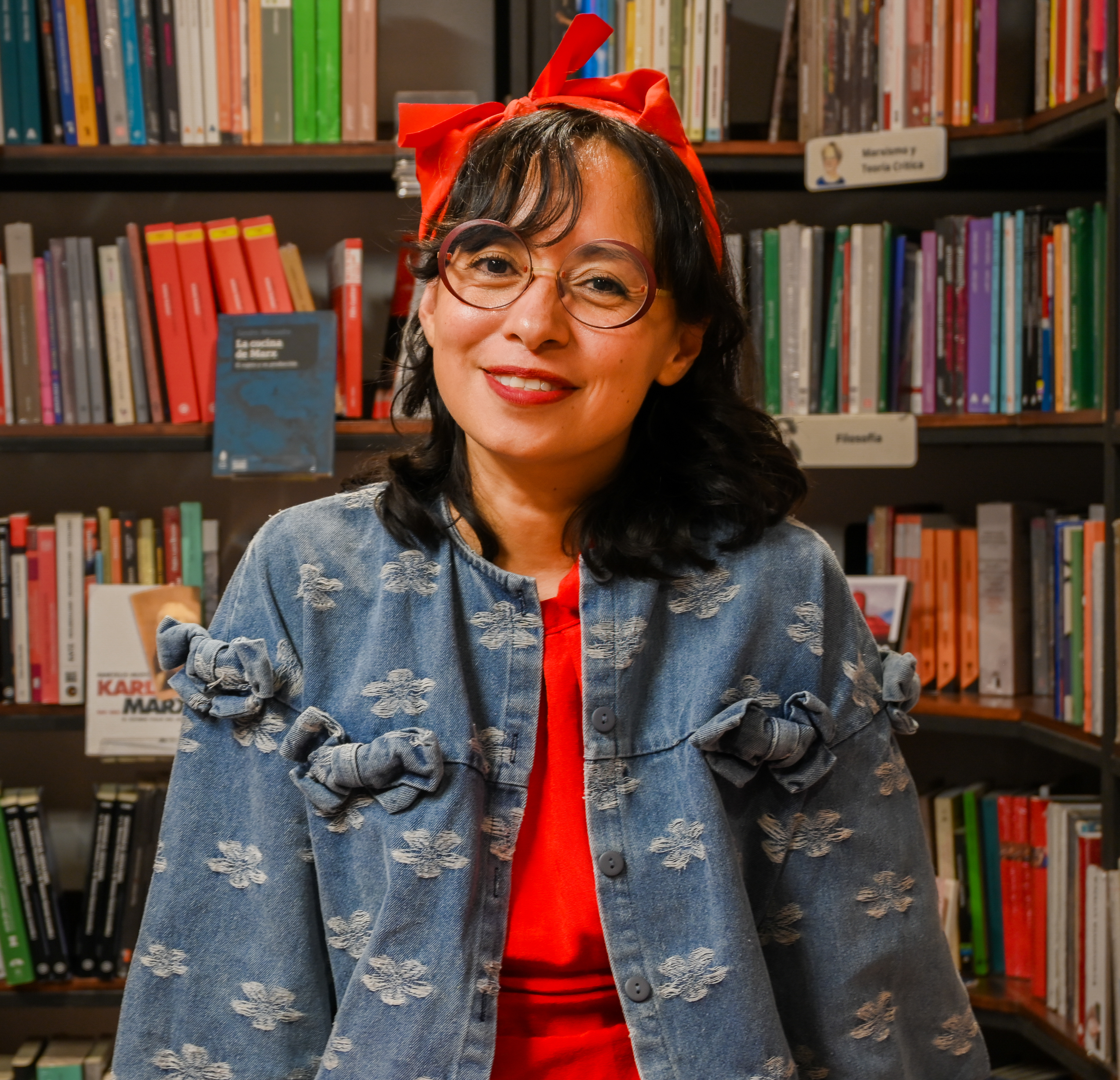
- Brenda Navarro at the U-tópicas bookstore 2025, by ProtoplasmaKid
- Born: February 26, 1982 (age 44); Mexico City
- Education: University of Barcelona; National Autonomous University of Mexico
- Occupation: Writer
- Writing career
- Years active: 2011–present

Brenda Navarro (born 26 February 1982) is a Mexican writer, sociologist, and economist. She researches and writes about women's labour, women's access to culture, digital rights and humanities, and migration.

== Biography ==
Navarro was born in Mexico City in 1982. She studied sociology and economy at the National Autonomous University of Mexico. She then went on to study a Master's degree on gender and citizenship at the University of Barcelona. She currently resides in Madrid.

In 2016 she founded #EnjambreLiterario, a group of writers who promote writing by women.

Her debut novel Empty Houses was translated from Spanish by Sophie Hughes and won the PEN Translates award in 2019. It is set against the backdrop of Mexico's war on drugs.

Her second novel Ceniza en la boca (Ash in the Mouth) was released in spring 2022. It focuses on Ulysses syndrome – a chronic stress disorder that affects immigrants. In 2025, it was adapted for film, by Diego Luna .

=== Awards ===
- Premio Tigre Juan (2020)
- PEN Translates (2019)

== Bibliography ==
=== Novels ===
- Empty Houses (2018)
- Ceniza en la boca (2022)
  - Eating Ashes by Brenda Navarro. Translated by Megan McDowell. Liverlight, 2026.

=== Short stories ===
- "El asalto a Raúl Castro" (2011)
- "La cobija azul" (2013)
- "Jauría de perros" (2015)

=== Essay ===
- "La construcción de redes, una respuesta antes las políticas migratorias de Estados Unidos" (2018)

=== Poetry ===
- "4 diatribas y media en la Ciudad de México" (2020)
