= Perfection (novel) =

2022 novel by Vincenzo Latronico

- Italian book cover
- Author: Vincenzo Latronico
- Language: Italian
- Subject: Privilege, Insularity, Authenticity, Relationships, Fulfillment
- Genre: Novel, Literary fiction
- Set in: Berlin, Lisbon
- Published: 2022
- Publisher: New York Review Books
- Publication place: United Kingdom, United States
- English publication date: 2025
- Media type: Print, E-book, Audio
- Pages: 125
- ISBN: 9781681378725
- OCLC: 1442322411

Perfection (Italian: Le perfezioni, lit. 'the perfections') is a 2022 novel by Vincenzo Latronico. It has been translated from Italian into English by Sophie Hughes. The book was shortlisted for the 2025 International Booker Prize. It was published by New York Review Books, Fitzcarraldo Editions and Text Publishing in 2025.

== Plot ==
Millennial digital artists, Anna and Tom, have become expats in Berlin. They moved from a "large but peripheral city in Southern Europe" during Angela Merkel's second term, when Berlin's influence was expanding across Europe. They moved into a 19th-century flat in the trendy Neukölln area. The couple focused on materials that expressed their acculturated tastes, their online identities, and the art and excitement of the city of Berlin itself. Ultimately they experienced an emptiness to their lives as the years passed. They then embarked on a digital nomad lifestyle to Lisbon and then Sicily, only to discover that wherever they go their life is the same.

The novel is a tribute to Georges Perec's Things: A Story of the Sixties, which shares a similar plot and themes.

== Reception ==
The novel received positive reviews from critics. Thomas McMullan of The Guardian praised it as "thought-provoking" and praised Latronico's satire, but criticized aspects of the style.

Alice Gregory of The New Yorker praised the execution of the novel and Latronico's commentary. It was named as one of the best books of 2025 by the magazine.

Sophie Hughes' translation of the novel into English was shortlisted for the 2025 International Booker Prize, making her the first translator to receive 5 nominations and the first translator to be shortlisted three times.
