= Carolina Orloff =

Argentine publisher and translator

Carolina Orloff is an Argentine publisher and translator. She was born in Buenos Aires and studied at the University of York and the University of Leeds. In 2010, she obtained her PhD in Latin American Literature from the University of Edinburgh, later becoming a postdoctoral research fellow at the same institution.

She is the co-founder of the Edinburgh-based publishing house Charco Press, for whom she has co-translated three books by Ariana Harwicz, and one by Jorge Consiglio. She is also a specialist in the work of the Argentine writer Julio Cortázar. She wrote the monograph The Representation of the Political in Selected Writings of Julio Cortázar and translated the same into Spanish. With Micaela Ortelli, she has also translated the complete short stories of Virginia Woolf into Spanish.

== Translations ==
- Die, My Love
