= Juana Adcock =

Mexican-born poet and translator

- Born: 1982 (age 43–44); Mexico
- Occupations: Poet, translator
- Writing career
- Language: Spanish, English
- Period: 21st century
- Genres: Poetry, literary translation
- Notable works: Manca (2014), Split (2019)
- Notable awards: Poetry Book Society Choice

Juana Adcock (born 1982) is a Mexican-born, Scotland-based poet and translator. Her first collection of poems Manca appeared in 2014, and was chosen by the Mexican critic Sergio González Rodríguez as one of the best poetry books of the year. Her second collection Split was published by Blue Diode in 2019 and was a Poetry Book Society Choice. Her 2025 book, I Sugar the Bones, was shortlisted for Scotland's National Book Awards Scottish Poetry Book of the Year. Her work has appeared in Words Without Borders, Asymptote, and Glasgow Review of Books.

== Selected works ==
=== Book-length translations ===
- Slim: Portrait of the World's Richest Man by Diego Osorno
- Sexographies by Gabriela Wiener (with Lucy Greaves)
- Gavia Stellata by Alexander Hutchison
- The Sadness of Shadows, by Lola Ancira
- An Orphan World by Giuseppe Caputo (with Sophie Hughes)
