= James Noel =

James Noel may refer to:

- James Latane Noel Jr. (1909–1997), American federal judge
- James Noel (basketball) (born 1982), British basketball player
- James Noël (poet) (born 1978), Haitian poet and writer
