= Sophie Hughes =

British literary translator

- Born: Sophie Hughes
- Education: University College London
- Occupation: Translator

Sophie Hughes (born 1986) is a British literary translator who works chiefly from Spanish to English.

She is known for her translations of contemporary writers such as Laia Jufresa, Rodrigo Hasbún, Alia Trabucco Zerán and Fernanda Melchor. Works translated by Hughes have been shortlisted for the International Dublin Literary Award, International Booker Prize, Man Booker International Prize, in addition to other awards. As of 2025, after being longlisted for the International Booker Prize for her translation of Perfection by Vincenzo Latronico, Hughes has been nominated five times for the International Booker Prize, more than any other translator.

== Personal life ==
Hughes was born in Chertsey, Surrey, England, in June 1986 and currently lives in Birmingham. She was first interested in translation when she read a novel in English, but it did not have existing translations into Spanish at the time, so she started to translate it. She stated that she knew within just translating a few lines, that translation would become a central part of her life. She finds the freedom within the parameters of a really well-conceived story and tightly-controlled prose.

== Education ==
Hughes received a master's degree in Comparative Literature from University College London in 2011. Hughes was mentored by translator Margaret Jull Costa, which was a pivotal educational step in her professional development.

== Career ==
Following graduation from University College London, Hughes moved to Mexico City and began working as Asymptote's editor-at-large. During this time, she also served as a guest editor for Words Without Borders. She also translated journalistic work about Mexico for English PEN and The Guardian, as well as a section of the essay collection The Sorrows of Mexico. Hughes has also worked as a translation correspondent for Dazed & Confused.

Hughes' first published book was a translation of The Boy Who Stole Attila's Horse by Iván Repila, published in 2015.

She is interested in co-translation and has worked with Amanda Hopkinson, Margaret Jull Costa, and Juana Adcock.

== Translations ==
=== Books ===
- Perfection by Vincenzo Latronico (2025)
- Clean by Alia Trabucco Zeran (2024)
- Woodworm by Layla Martínez (with Annie McDermott) (2024)
- This Is Not Miami by Fernanda Melchor (2023)
- Paradais by Fernanda Melchor (2022)
- When Women Kill: Four Crimes Retold by Alia Trabucco Zeran (2022)
- Empty Houses by Brenda Navarro (2020)
- Hurricane Season by Fernanda Melchor (2020)
- The Sorrows of Mexico by Lydia Cacho et al. (contributor) (2020)
- Mac and His Problem by Enrique Vila-Matas (with Margaret Jull Costa) (2019)
- An Orphan World by Giuseppe Caputo (with Juana Adcock) (2019)
- The Hole by José Revueltas (with Amanda Hopkinson) (2018)
- The Remainder by Alia Trabucco Zerán (2018)
- Affections by Rodrigo Hasbún (2017)
- Still the Same Man by Jon Bilbao (2016)
- The Boy Who Stole Attila's Horse by Iván Repila (2015)
- Umami by Laia Jufresa (2015)

=== Essays ===
- "I Am Not Your Cholo" by Marco Avilés, in Words Without Borders (2017)
- "Señor Socket and the Señora from the Café" by Julio Villanueva Chang, in Words Without Borders (2017)

=== Short stories ===
- "The Cornerist" by Laia Jufresa, in Words Without Borders (2015)
- "Long Distance" by Rodrigo Hasbún, in Words Without Borders (2015)
- "Mexico Interrupted" with Thomas Bunstead, in Words Without Borders (2015)
- "An Orphan World" by Giuseppe Caputo, in Words Without Borders (2017)
- "A Bitter Pill" by Alia Trabucco Zerán, in Words Without Borders (2019)

== Awards and honours ==
Year	Award	Work Translated	Result	Ref.
2025	International Booker Prize	Perfection by Vincenzo Latronico	Shortlist	
2022	International Booker Prize	Paradais by Fernanda Melchor	Longlist	
2021	International Dublin Literary Award	Hurricane Season by Fernanda Melchor	Shortlist	
2020	International Booker Prize	Hurricane Season by Fernanda Melchor	Shortlist	
2020	National Book Award for Translated Literature	Hurricane Season by Fernanda Melchor	Longlist	
2020	International Booker Prize	Mac and His Problem by Enrique Vila-Matas, with Margaret Jull Costa	Longlist	
2020	Premio Valle Inclán	Mac and His Problem by Enrique Vila-Matas, with Margaret Jull Costa	Shortlist	
2019	Premio Valle Inclán	The Remainder by Alia Trabucco Zerán	Shortlist	
2019	Man Booker International Prize	The Remainder by Alia Trabucco Zerán	Shortlist	
2019	PEN Translates	Empty Houses by Brenda Navarro	Recipient	
2018	Arts Foundation Fellowship		Recipient	
2018	National Translation Award	Affections by Rodrigo Hasbún	Longlist	
2018	PEN Translates	Hurricane Season by Fernanda Melchor	Winner	
2018	PEN Translates	The Remainder by Alia Trabucco Zerán	Winner	
2017	PEN/Heim Translation Fund Grant	The Remainder by Alia Trabucco Zerán	Recipient	
2017	Best Translated Book Award	Umami by Laia Jufresa	Shortlist	
2015	British Centre for Literary Translation Prose Mentorship		Recipient	
	ALTA National Translation Award		Longlist	
