= Die My Love =

2025 film by Lynne Ramsay

- Theatrical release poster
- Directed by: Lynne Ramsay
- Screenplay by: Enda Walsh; Lynne Ramsay; Alice Birch
- Based on: Die, My Love by Ariana Harwicz
- Produced by: Martin Scorsese; Jennifer Lawrence; Justine Ciarrocchi; Molly Smith; Thad Luckinbill; Trent Luckinbill; Andrea Calderwood
- Starring: Jennifer Lawrence; Robert Pattinson; LaKeith Stanfield; Nick Nolte; Sissy Spacek
- Cinematography: Seamus McGarvey
- Edited by: Toni Froschhammer
- Music by: George Vjestica; Raife Burchell; Lynne Ramsay
- Production companies: Black Label Media; Excellent Cadaver; Sikelia Productions
- Distributed by: Mubi
- Release dates: May 17, 2025 (Cannes); November 7, 2025 (United States)
- Running time: 119 minutes
- Country: United States
- Language: English
- Box office: $12.2 million

Die My Love is a 2025 American psychological drama film directed by Lynne Ramsay, who co-wrote the screenplay with Enda Walsh and Alice Birch. Based on the 2012 novel by Ariana Harwicz, it follows a young mother (Jennifer Lawrence) in rural Montana whose severe postpartum depression and psychosis unravel her marriage to her husband (Robert Pattinson) and her grip on reality. The supporting cast includes LaKeith Stanfield, Nick Nolte, and Sissy Spacek.

Die My Love had its world premiere at the 2025 Cannes Film Festival on May 17, 2025, where it was nominated for the Palme d'Or. It was theatrically released in the United States by Mubi on November 7, 2025. It received generally positive reviews from critics, with praise for Lawrence's performance. At the 83rd Golden Globe Awards she was nominated for Best Actress.

== Plot ==
Jackson's uncle leaves his Montana home to him after his death. Jackson decides to move there from New York with his pregnant girlfriend, Grace. Soon after the couple moves in, Grace gives birth to a baby boy. While initially happy and playful in their rural abode, Grace and Jackson begin to have problems. He is away at work for long periods, and her feelings of boredom, loneliness, and abandonment worsen when she finds condoms in his car and assumes he has been sleeping with other women.

In the months leading up to the baby's birth, Jackson's father, Harry, passes away. During a conversation with Jackson's mother, Pam, now a widow, Grace learns that Jackson's uncle had died by suicide inside the couple's home by shooting himself. To Grace's chagrin, Jackson brings home an untrained, constantly barking dog without any prior discussion. One night, after the dog is injured in a car accident, she demands that Jackson shoot it. When Jackson refuses, saying he will take it to the vet the next day, Grace shoots it herself.

As time goes on, Grace's behavior grows erratic. She walks around with knives, begins an affair with a married stranger who drives by the house on a motorcycle, and throws herself through a glass door. In the midst of all this, Grace and Jackson fight continuously, leading Grace to spin out and react more intensely. Despite their constant fighting, Jackson asks Grace to marry him.

The wedding and reception start off well, but as the night continues, Jackson rebuffs Grace when she repeatedly asks him to kiss her and leaves her to dance on her own. In the bridal suite without Jackson, Grace has a concierge sing and play guitar for her in her hotel room. She bashes her head into a mirror and walks home on foot in the morning with the baby in a stroller. Jackson finds her and commits Grace to a psychiatric institution. The psychiatrist suggests that she has abandonment issues that stem from the death of her parents when she was a child. When a seemingly improved Grace is released, she learns that Jackson has cleaned, remodeled, and repainted the house, been given a new car, and named their baby Harry, after his deceased father.

When the family hosts a welcome-back party for Grace, she snaps after hearing how "healthy" and "well" she looks and tries to leave. Jackson takes her on a drive, during which she expresses that she does not want to go back and that Jackson does not see her. When they reach a stopping point, they sit in silence for some time, before Grace kisses Jackson and says, "Enough," walking into the nearby forest. Grace sets fire to the book she had been writing. She leaves the journal to burn while she removes her dress. Jackson realizes that something is wrong and runs into the forest just in time to see Grace walk into the rapidly spreading fire.

== Cast ==
- Jennifer Lawrence as Grace
- Robert Pattinson as Jackson
- LaKeith Stanfield as Karl
- Nick Nolte as Harry, Jackson's deceased father
- Sissy Spacek as Pam, Jackson's mother
- Gabrielle Rose as Jen
- Debs Howard as Marsha
- Sarah Lind as Cheryl
- Phillip Lewitski as Charlie
- Georgina Lightning as Kathleen the Orderly

== Production ==
=== Development ===
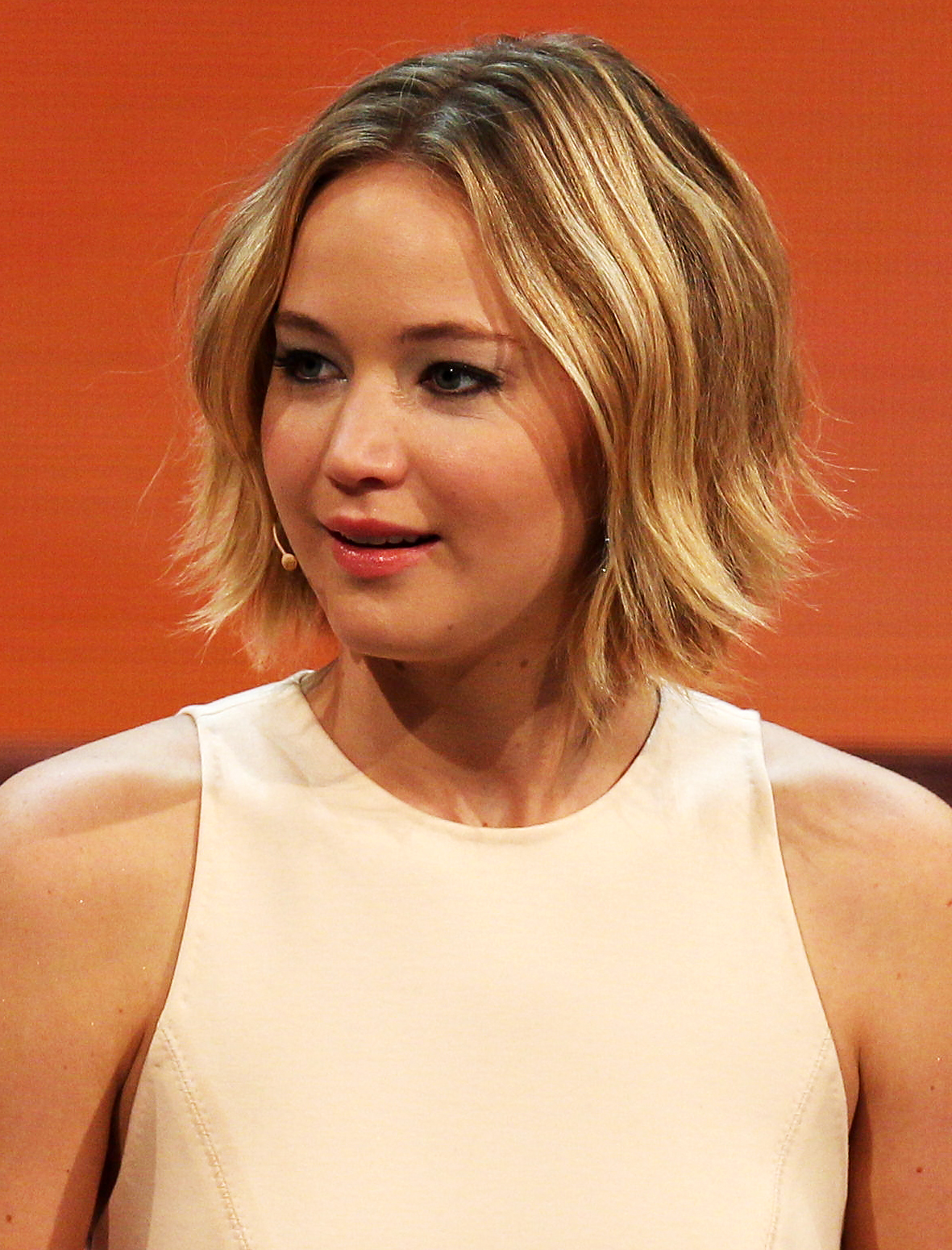
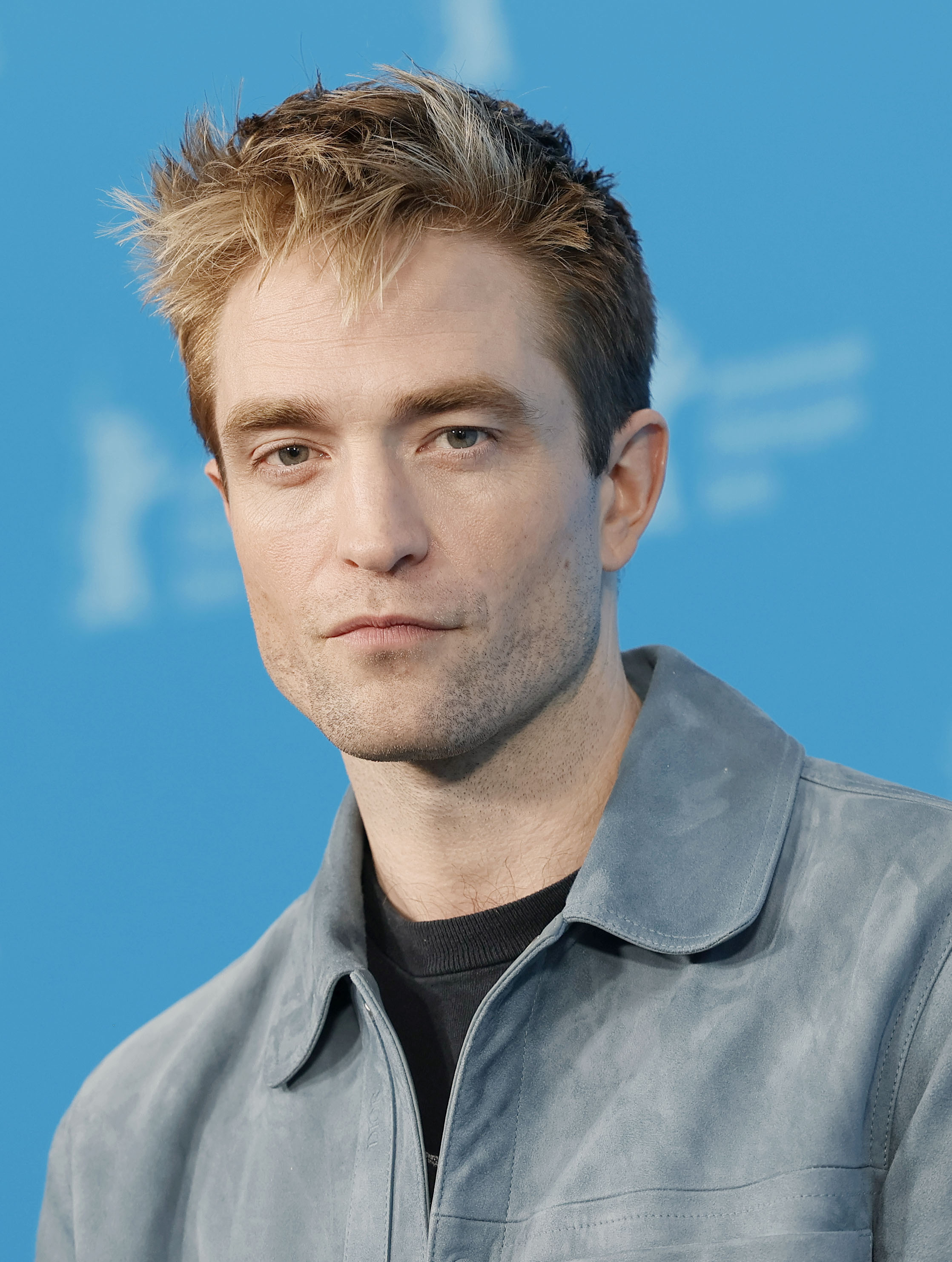
Stars Jennifer Lawrence and Robert Pattinson

The film is an adaptation of Ariana Harwicz's 2012 novel Die, My Love, titled Matate, amor in the original Spanish. In 2022, Martin Scorsese sent the novel to Excellent Cadaver (run by Jennifer Lawrence and Justine Ciarrochi) after reading it in his book club with other filmmakers, envisioning an adaptation with Lawrence in the lead role. Scorsese and Lawrence had previously been in discussion in adapting Kate Chopin's 1899 novel, The Awakening, but eventually decided on doing Die My Love together, seeing it as a more challenging role. In November 2022, Lawrence confirmed she would star in the film, which Lynne Ramsay was co-writing with playwright Enda Walsh. Ramsay became involved as director after Lawrence sent her the book. Ramsay was initially going to pass on the project as she had already done similar postpartum themes with We Need to Talk About Kevin (2011) and offered another project to Lawrence. Lawrence declined the other project, insisting on working on Die My Love together, to which Ramsay eventually agreed when she decided to focus on it being a "bonkers, crazy love story", rather than about postpartum depression.

Her first film since You Were Never Really Here (2017), Ramsay approached Walsh to write the first draft of the script and agreed to write the second and final draft. Alice Birch also took part in co-writing the script. In the script, the location was changed to the United States, whereas in the book it was set in rural France. By April 2024, Ramsay and George Vjestica were writing music for Lawrence to record.

In July 2024, Robert Pattinson was in talks to join the film, produced by Scorsese and Andrea Calderwood alongside the Excellent Cadaver team of Lawrence and Ciarrocchi. Lawrence offered Pattinson the role after another project the two were discussing with each other fell through. In August, LaKeith Stanfield, Sissy Spacek, and Nick Nolte joined the cast. The film is a thriller, while Ramsay and Pattinson have also described it as a dark comedy, with Ramsay saying "it's my kind of comedy and love story, so it's going to be dark and fucked-up" and Pattinson calling it "hilarious".

=== Filming ===
Filming was initially set for 2023 before being postponed due to the Hollywood strikes. Production began in and around Calgary, Canada, on August 19, 2024, and wrapped on October 16. Cinematographer Seamus McGarvey reunited with Ramsay after We Need to Talk About Kevin (2011). He shot the film on 35mm and in 1.33:1 Academy ratio, inspired by Roman Polanski's Repulsion (1965) and Rosemary's Baby (1968) (although those films were shot, respectively, in aspect ratios of 1.66:1 and 1.85:1).

Pattinson related an anecdote about being extremely nervous for a dance sequence and being unable to convince Ramsay and Lawrence to cut or choreograph the scene. He took dancing classes for the role. He later spoke further about the environment on set, specifically dialogue changes: "It is just quite an unusual environment… Some of the stuff we're doing… there's one scene where there were three or four pages of dialogue, and we turn up and Lynne says, 'I think I'm just going to do it with no dialogue.' It's kind of scary, but it's very, very exciting. It makes you feel very alive."

On the experience of dealing with the darker material while being four-and-a-half months pregnant at the beginning of filming, Lawrence said that what her character "[goes] through is the hormonal imbalance that comes from postpartum. [...] I had great hormones! I was feeling great, which is the only way I would be able to dip into this emotion." However, while reading the book, Lawrence spoke of it being hard to separate what she would do differently from Grace, the character, and called it "heartbreaking". She related with the identity crisis her character went through as a mother and that, despite having a "great postpartum with [her] first" child when she read Harwicz's book, she experienced "a really hard postpartum" period following the birth of her second. Lawrence felt that watching the movie in retrospect of experiencing postpartum depression was "really bizarre [...] after feeling like I've been through that forest."

Cinematographer McGarvey employed unconventional techniques during production, including burning lenses and singeing the camera gate to create what Lawrence described as a distinctive "inky look".

== Release and reception ==
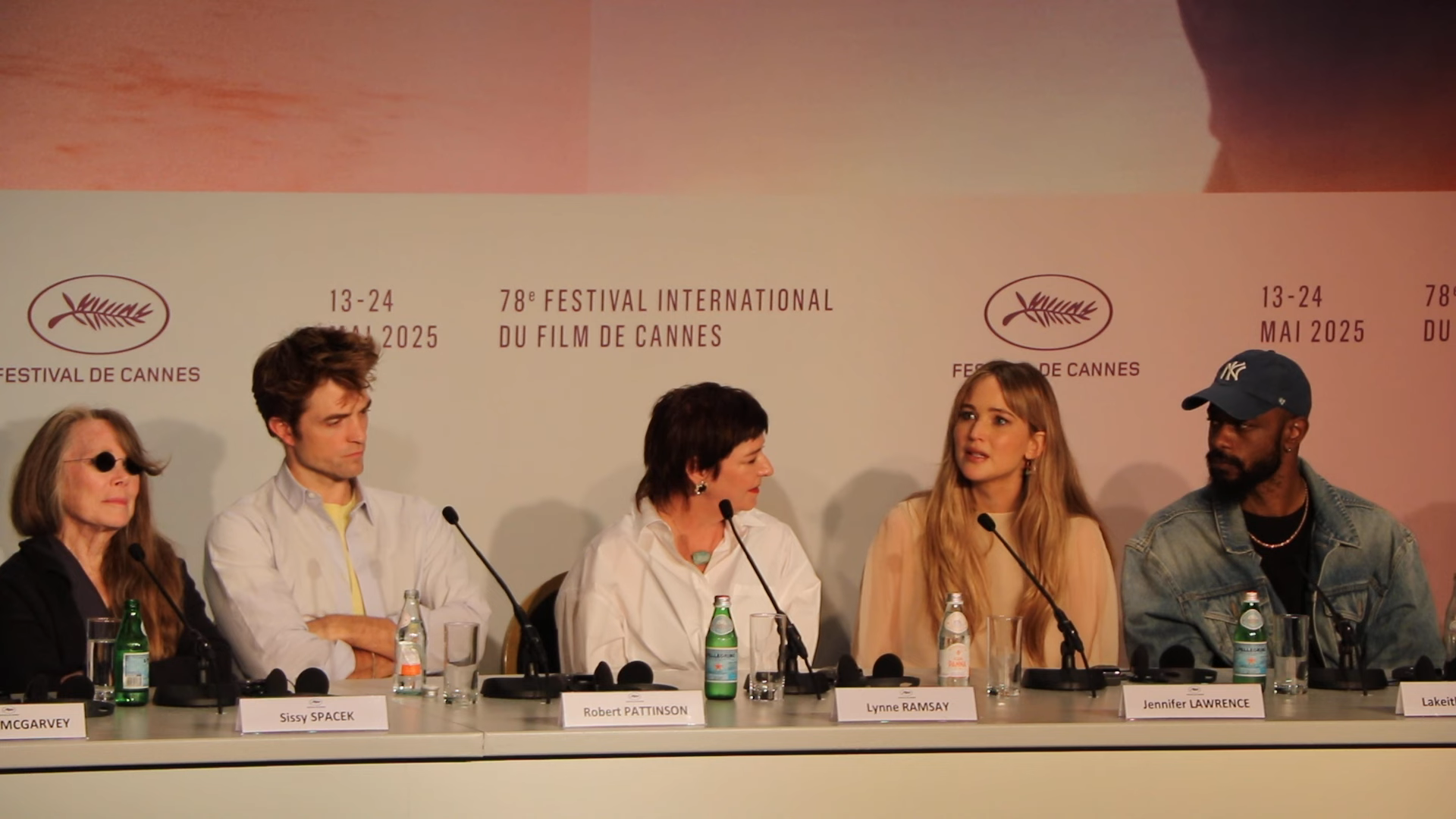
Director Lynne Ramsay (middle) and the film's cast at the 2025 Cannes press conference

In April 2025, the film secured a spot at the 2025 Cannes Film Festival. It premiered at the festival, in competition for the Palme d'Or, on May 17. The film reportedly received a six-minute standing ovation following its world premiere. The recently launched 193 handled distribution sales. Shortly after its Cannes premiere, Mubi acquired distribution rights to the film in North and Latin America, the United Kingdom, Ireland, Germany, Austria, Switzerland, Italy, Spain, the Benelux, Turkey, India, Australia and New Zealand for $24 million, their largest acquisition to date, committing to a theatrical release for 45 days on 1,500 screens across the United States. It was released in the United States on November 7, 2025. The film began streaming on Mubi on December 23, 2025.

The film was re-edited after its screening in Cannes.

The film held an awards screening at the 73rd San Sebastián International Film Festival following Lawrence's Donostia Award ceremony, with additional screenings planned for at the 2025 Vienna International Film Festival, the 69th BFI London Film Festival as a Gala selection, the 20th Rome Film Festival, and the 2025 Stockholm International Film Festival.

=== Box office ===
Die My Love grossed $5.5 million in the United States and Canada, and $6.7 million in other territories, for a worldwide total of $12.2 million.

Die My Love made $2.6 million from 1,983 theaters in its opening weekend, finishing in eighth at the box office. In the same weekend, the film became Lynne Ramsay's highest grossing film in the United States. In its second weekend, it grossed $891,010, finishing in 12th. By the end of its run, the film became Ramsay's highest grossing movie worldwide.

=== Critical response ===
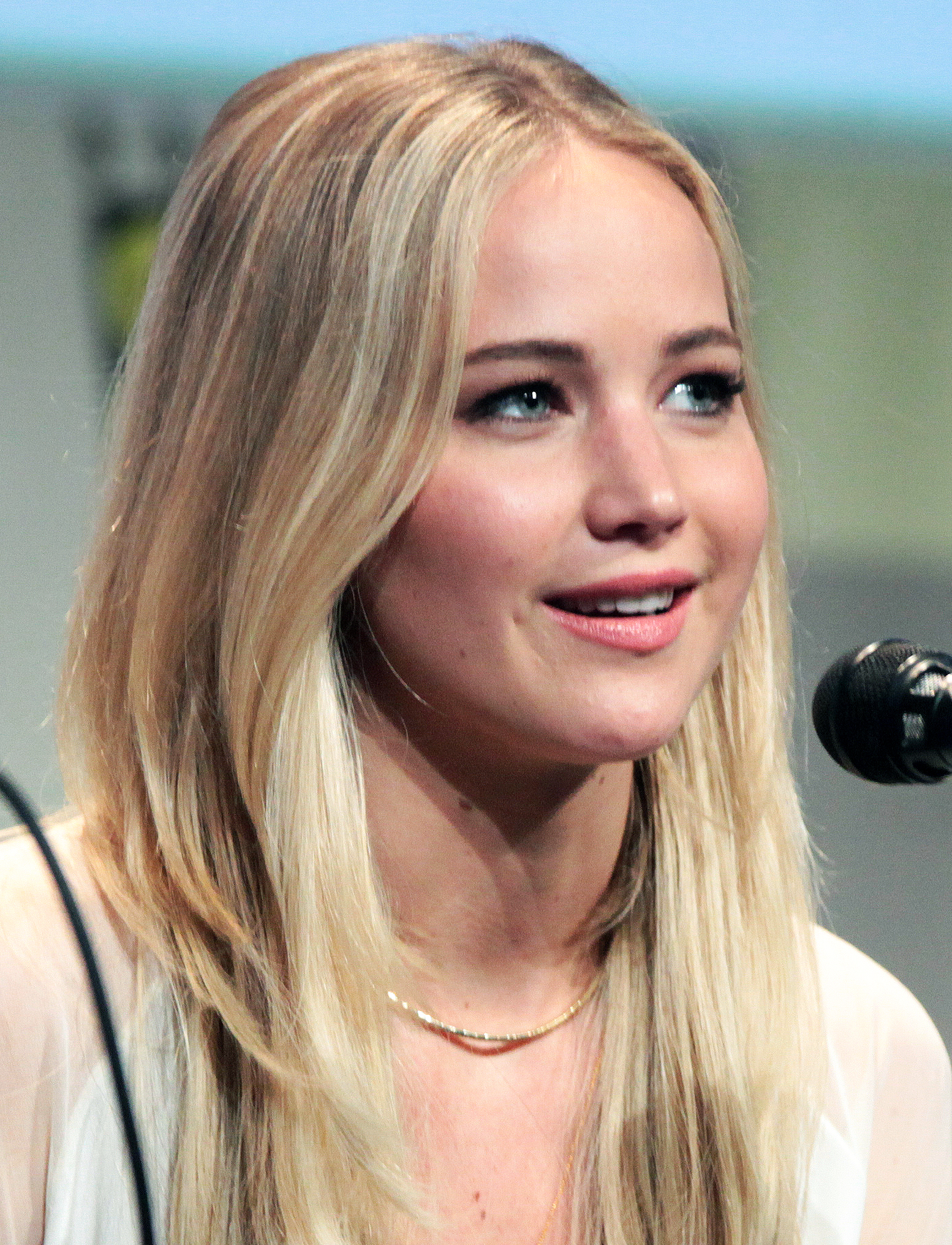
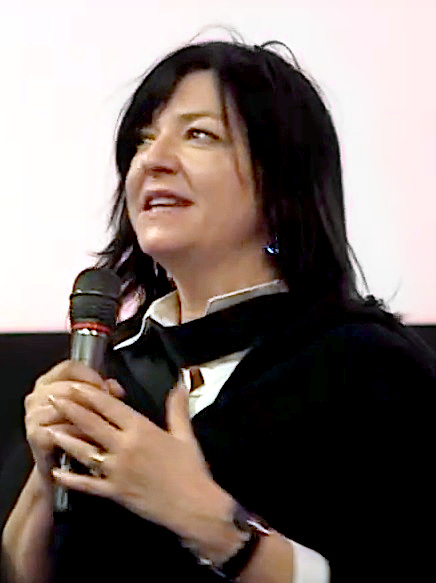
Lawrence and Ramsay received critical acclaim for their work, with many citing the former as having given a career-best performance.

Die My Love received generally positive reviews from critics following its premiere at the 2025 Cannes Film Festival, with particular acclaim for Jennifer Lawrence's intense portrayal of postpartum psychosis and Lynne Ramsay's stylistic direction, albeit audience responses were more polarized. On the review aggregator website Rotten Tomatoes, 75% of 268 critics' reviews are positive, with an average rating of 7/10. The website's consensus reads: "A frenzied depiction of a common but oft-ignored experience, Die My Love might be too stylistically mannered to fully connect but gifts Jennifer Lawrence with one of her most vivid roles yet." Metacritic, which uses a weighted average, assigned the film a score of 72 out of 100, based on 54 critics, indicating "generally favorable" reviews. Audiences polled by CinemaScore gave the film an average grade of "D+" on its A+ to F scale.

Many critics singled out Lawrence's performance, which Deadline Hollywood described as deserving of an Academy Award, and Ramsay's direction for praise. Tim Grierson of Screen International declared Lawrence "the match that lights Lynne Ramsay's gripping, slow-burn fifth feature", highlighting its layered examination of mental health and volatile relationships. Nicholas Barber of the BBC wrote that Lawrence "is better than ever".

Rafa Sales Ross of The Playlist called Lawrence the "undeniable propulsive force" of the film, noting her "rare ability to swing from effortless charm... straight into the dark abyss." Stephanie Zacharek of Time raved that it's "the kind of performance you go to the movies for, one that connects so sympathetically with... human suffering that it scares you a little."

Dave Calhoun of Time Out labeled it a "deeply raw and honest film" with a "musical, black-comic, big-hearted spirit that pulls you through the despair." However, Owen Gleiberman of Variety viewed it as "reckless on the surface but overdetermined", critiquing its thesis-like approach to motherhood's burdens. In a review for The Washington Post, Sonia Rao awarded the film 2.5 stars, praising Lawrence as "brilliant" but faulting the lack of postpartum exploration as "baffling at best and exploitative at worst".

Sheila O'Malley of RogerEbert.com awarded the film three-and-a-half stars out of four, comparing Lawrence's performance to Catherine Deneuve in Repulsion and calling the film "a wild and worthwhile ride".

=== Accolades ===
| Award | Date of ceremony | Category | Recipient(s) | Result | Ref. |
|---|---|---|---|---|---|
| Cannes Film Festival | 24 May 2025 | Palme d'Or | Lynne Ramsay | Nominated | |
| British Independent Film Awards | 30 November 2025 | Best Director | Lynne Ramsay | Nominated | |
| British Independent Film Awards | 30 November 2025 | Best Lead Performance | Jennifer Lawrence | Nominated | |
| British Independent Film Awards | 30 November 2025 | Best Cinematography | Seamus McGarvey | Won | |
| British Independent Film Awards | 30 November 2025 | Best Effects | Victor Tomi | Nominated | |
| British Independent Film Awards | 30 November 2025 | Best Make-Up & Hair Design | Colleen Labaff, Miho Suzuki | Nominated | |
| British Independent Film Awards | 30 November 2025 | Best Music Supervision | Ian Neil, Raife Burchell | Won | |
| British Independent Film Awards | 30 November 2025 | Best Production Design | Tim Grimes | Nominated | |
| British Independent Film Awards | 30 November 2025 | Best Sound | Tim Burns, Paul Davies, Linda Forsén, Andrew Stirk, Ron Osiowy | Nominated | |
| Gotham Independent Film Awards | 1 December 2025 | Outstanding Lead Performance | Jennifer Lawrence | Nominated | |
| Chicago Film Critics Association | 11 December 2025 | Best Actress | Jennifer Lawrence | Nominated | |
| Phoenix Critics Circle | 11 December 2025 | Best Actress in a Leading Role | Jennifer Lawrence | Nominated | |
| New York Film Critics Online | 15 December 2025 | Best Director | Lynne Ramsay | Nominated | |
| New York Film Critics Online | 15 December 2025 | Best Actress | Jennifer Lawrence | Nominated | |
| Austin Film Critics Association | 18 December 2025 | Best Actress | Jennifer Lawrence | Nominated | |
| Dublin Film Critics' Circle | 18 December 2025 | Best Actress | Jennifer Lawrence | 3rd place | |
| Florida Film Critics Circle | 19 December 2025 | Best Actress | Jennifer Lawrence | Runner-up | |
| Florida Film Critics Circle | 19 December 2025 | Best Editing | Toni Froschhammer | Runner-up | |
| Kansas City Film Critics Circle | 21 December 2025 | Best Actress | Jennifer Lawrence | Nominated | |
| Women Film Critics Circle | 21 December 2025 | Best Movie About Women | Lynne Ramsay | Nominated | |
| Women Film Critics Circle | 21 December 2025 | Best Actress | Jennifer Lawrence | Nominated | |
| Women Film Critics Circle | 21 December 2025 | Best Woman Storyteller (Screenwriting Award) | Lynne Ramsay and Alice Birch (with Enda Walsh) | Nominated | |
| Women Film Critics Circle | 21 December 2025 | Karen Morley Award | Die My Love | Runner-up | |
| Puerto Rico Critics Association | 2 January 2026 | Best Actress | Jennifer Lawrence | Nominated | |
| Astra Film Awards | 9 January 2026 | Best Indie Feature | Die My Love | Nominated | |
| Astra Film Awards | 9 January 2026 | Best Actress – Drama | Jennifer Lawrence | Nominated | |
| Golden Globe Awards | 11 January 2026 | Best Actress in a Motion Picture – Drama | Jennifer Lawrence | Nominated | |
| European Film Awards | 17 January 2026 | European Editor | Toni Froschhammer | Nominated | |
| London Film Critics' Circle | 1 February 2026 | Actress of the Year | Jennifer Lawrence | Nominated | |
| London Film Critics' Circle | 1 February 2026 | Technical Achievement (Editing) | Toni Froschhammer | Nominated | |
| British Society of Cinematographers | 7 February 2026 | Best Cinematography in a Theatrical Feature Film | Seamus McGarvey | Nominated | |
| International Cinephile Society | 8 February 2026 | Best Actress | Jennifer Lawrence | Nominated | |
| International Cinephile Society | 8 February 2026 | Best Sound Design | Tim Burns, Paul Davies | Nominated | |
| Irish Film & Television Academy Awards | 20 February 2026 | Best International Actress | Jennifer Lawrence | Nominated | |
| Irish Film & Television Academy Awards | 20 February 2026 | Best Script | Enda Walsh | Nominated | |
| Irish Film & Television Academy Awards | 20 February 2026 | Best Cinematography | Seamus McGarvey | Won | |
| British Academy Film Awards | 22 February 2026 | Outstanding British Film | Lynne Ramsay, Martin Scorsese, Jennifer Lawrence, Justine Cirrocchi, Andrea Calderwood, Enda Walsh, and Alice Birch | Nominated | |
| Guild of Music Supervisors Awards | 28 February 2026 | Best Music Supervision in Low-Budget Films | Raife Burchell, Ian Neil | Nominated | |
