= Rodrigo Hasbún =

Bolivian writer (born 1981)

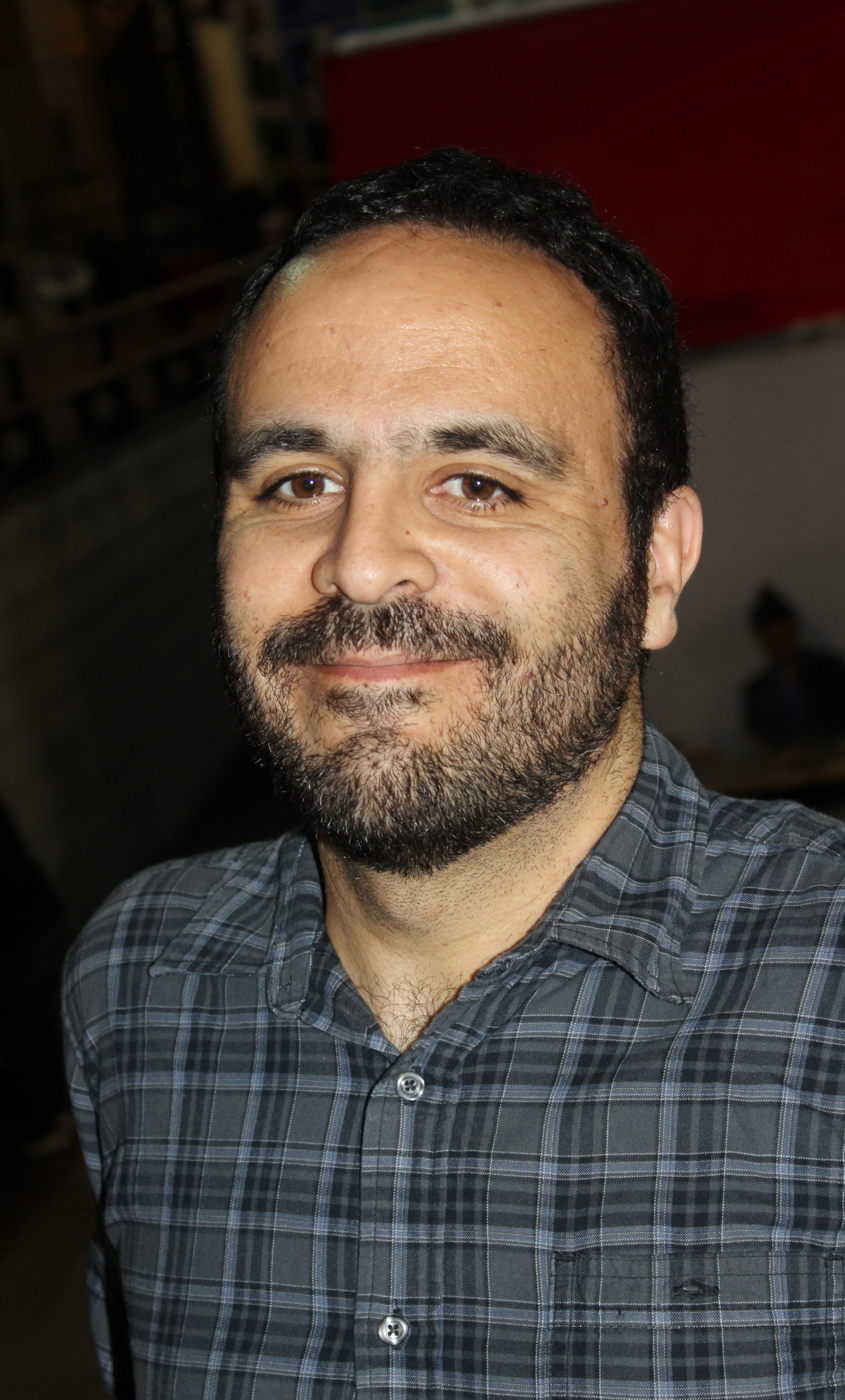
- The Bolivian writer Rodrigo Hasbun during the conversation The rare narrative forms in which Galo Ghigliotto (Chile, izq.) also participated.
- Born: 1981 (age 44–45); Cochabamba, Bolivia
- Occupation: Writer
- Writing career
- Notable work: Los afectos (Affections)

Rodrigo Hasbún (born 1981) is a Bolivian writer. He was born in Cochabamba. He has published a collection of short stories and two novels to date; his second novel Los Afectos (Affections) has been translated in 10 languages. In 2017, Hasbun was included in the Bogotá39 list of the most promising young writers in Latin America.

== Biography ==
He studied journalism in Bolivia and, after finishing university, Hasbún spent a year, between 2003 and 2004, in Santiago de Chile, a country where his grandparents and also his father had lived. Afterwards, he pursued a postgraduate degree in Barcelona (2004–2005).

The first collection of his stories, Cinco, appeared in 2006, and the following year he was selected by the Hay Festival and Bogotá World Capital of the Book as one of the 39 most important Latin American writers under 39 years old.

Based on the short story "Carretera", which was part of Cinco, Bolivian director Martín Boulocq shot his second feature film, Los viejos, which was released in 2011. Hasbún and Boulocq (born in Cochabamba in 1981) grew up together and have done many things in common (the filmmaker was also part of the band where the writer played).

He published his first award-winning novel, El lugar del cuerpo, in 2007, and two years later he was selected in the list of the top ten outstanding Latin American writers by the American magazine Zoetrope: All Story. The following year, he was chosen by the British magazine Granta, which also has a Spanish version, as one of the 22 best Spanish-language writers under 35 years old.

In 2009, Hasbún moved to Ithaca to pursue a doctorate at Cornell University.

Hasbún's doctoral thesis focuses on the intimate diaries of Latin American writers, and he himself has been keeping a personal diary for twelve years, which may be his "most important writing." He has around thirty notebooks written, safely stored in his parents' house in Bolivia. Once he completed his studies at Cornell, Hasbún moved to the Canadian city of Toronto in 2014.

== Bibliography ==
=== Novels ===
- El lugar del cuerpo (2007)
- Los afectos (2015). Affections, trans. Sophie Hughes (Simon & Schuster, 2017)
- Los años invisibles (2020). The Invisible Years, trans. Lily Meyer (forthcoming)

=== Short story collections ===
- Cinco (2006)
- Los días más felices (2011)
- Cuatro (2014)
