= Joanna Pocock =

Irish-Canadian writer

Joanna Pocock is an Irish-Canadian writer, best known for her 2019 book length essay, Surrender, and her 2025 non-fiction book, Greyhound, both published in the UK by Fitzcarraldo Editions. The US edition of Greyhound is published by Soft Skull Press.

== Life ==
Pocock is originally from Alta Vista, Ottawa. Her family has roots in Ireland, England, Wales, and Scotland.

She moved to Toronto at age 17, where she studied at the Ontario College of Art and Design. After graduating, she worked as an illustrator and a designer. At Books in Canada, she won an award for the redesign of the organisation's magazine. She has also lived in New York and Boston for short periods. and in Montana for two years where she wrote most of her book Surrender.

She moved to Great Britain in her 20s, where she met her husband. She gained an MA in creative writing from Bath Spa University and taught creative writing at Central St Martins in London.

She currently lives in London where she teaches prose fiction, environmental writing and narrative non-fiction at the University of the Arts and works as a freelance copy editor.

== Career ==
In 2017, she was shortlisted for the Barry Lopez Narrative Nonfiction Prize.

In 2018, Pocock won the Fitzcarraldo Editions Essay Prize for her book length essay Surrender. The book, which detailed Pocock's time living in the American West as well as reflections on the community and land, was published by Fitzcarraldo Editions in the UK and House of Anansi Press in Canada and the US. A French edition was published by Mémoire d'encrier and a Spanish edition by Errata Naturae editores

In 2021 she was awarded the Arts Foundation’s Environmental Writing Fellowship.

Pocock has continued to write essays mixing memoir with observations on culture, class and nature.

In August 2025, Fitzcarraldo Editions published Greyhound, Pocock's account of two bus journeys across America, the first in 2006 and the second in 2023. In 2026, Greyhound was shortlisted for the American National Book Critics Circle Award in Criticism, the Sherborne Travel Writing Prize in the UK , and the Ondaatje Prize .

Her writing has also appeared in "Guardian US", "The Spectator", "The New Statesman", Dazed & Confused, Granta Online, The Los Angeles Times, The Nation, Orion Magazine, Tank, 3:AM and Dark Mountain among other publications.
