= Jeremy Cooper =

British writer and art historian

Jeremy Cooper is a writer and art historian. He is the author of several novels and works of non-fiction, including studies of young British artists in the 1990s, scholarship on Victorian and Edwardian design, and the British Museum's 2019 catalogue of artists' postcards. In 2018, he won the first Fitzcarraldo Editions Novel Prize for Ash before Oak. Cooper's work has been covered by The New York Review of Books, The Times Literary Supplement, The British Film Institute, Bookforum, Literary Hub, and others. In The New Yorker, National Book Award-winning writer Sigrid Nunez said of Cooper's book Brian, "I can think of no finer exploration of what can happen when a person is fully open and attentive to art, and how a shared passion for art can connect people to one another."

Cooper was born in Dorset and lives in Somerset. He worked for Sotheby's and as Mohamed Al-Fayed's private art consultant before opening his own gallery in Bloomsbury. He appeared in the first twenty-four episodes of the BBC's Antiques Roadshow and was co-presenter of Radio 4's The Week's Antiques. He has written for The Sunday Times, The Observer and The Sunday Telegraph. He is a collector of historic postcard work by Dieter Roth, Richard Hamilton, Carl Andre, Claes Oldenburg and many others.

== Bibliography ==
=== Fiction ===
- Ruth (1986)
- Us (1990)
- The Folded Lie (1998)
- Kath Trevelyan (2007)
- Ash Before Oak (2019)
- Bolt From the Blue (2021)
- Brian (2023)
- Discord (2026)

=== Non-fiction ===
- Nineteenth-Century Romantic Bronzes: French, English and American Bronzes, 1830-1915 (1975)
- Under the Hammer: The Auctions and Auctioneers of London (1977; revised 1979)
- Dealing with Dealers: The Ins and Outs of the London Antiques Trade (1985)
- Victorian and Edwardian Furniture and Interiors: From the Gothic Revival to Art Nouveau (1987)
  - (US ed.) Victorian and Edwardian Decor: From the Gothic Revival to Art Nouveau (1987)
- Growing Up: The Young British Artists at 50 (2012)
- The World Exists to Be Put on a Postcard: Artists' Postcards from 1960 to Now (2019)
