= Hurricane Season (novel) =

2017 novel by Fernanda Melchor

- First edition
- Author: Fernanda Melchor
- Audio read by: Daniela Aedo
- Original title: Temporada de huracanes
- Translator: Sophie Hughes
- Language: Spanish
- Set in: Veracruz, Mexico
- Publisher: Literatura Random House
- Publication date: April 2017
- Publication place: Mexico
- English publication date: 19 February 2020
- Media type: Print (paperback)
- Pages: 224
- Awards: International Literature Award (2019)
- ISBN: 978-607-31-5273-0
- OCLC: 989794906
- Dewey Decimal: 863.7
- LC Class: PQ7298.423.E3795 T46 2017

Hurricane Season (Spanish: Temporada de huracanes) is the second novel by Mexican writer Fernanda Melchor, published in April 2017 by Literatura Random House. A nonlinear, third-person narrative, it focuses on the events surrounding the murder of the Witch of La Matosa, an impoverished fictional town in the state of Veracruz through which Melchor explores violence and machismo in Mexican society.

The novel was a critical and commercial success, solidifying Melchor as one of the most acclaimed Latin American writers of her generation. It has been translated into German by Angelica Ammar, and into English by Sophie Hughes. The novel was awarded the 2019 International Literature Award, shortlisted for the 2020 International Booker Prize and the 2021 Dublin Literary Award, and longlisted for the 2020 National Book Award for Translated Literature. A film adaptation of the same name, directed by Elisa Miller, was released by Netflix in 2023.

== Plot ==
One day, a group of children from the small town of La Matosa discover a decomposing corpse in a canal belonging to the Witch of the town. The Witch was a feared and respected woman who everyone turned to for help with their various problems. She lived in a large dilapidated house where she held parties with the village youth, to whom she paid money in exchange for sexual favors.

A girl named Yesenia lived with her grandmother and her cousins near the Witch. Throughout her life, Yesenia felt rejected by her grandmother in favor of her cousin Maurilio (nicknamed Luismi). She hated Maurilio because, despite having become an alcoholic and drug addict, he was still their grandmother's favorite. Luismi eventually moves in with his mother, Chabela, and his stepfather, Munra. Months later there are rumors that he has a wife and is expecting a child. On the day of the murder, Yesenia watches from her house and sees Munra's truck parked at the house of the Witch. She then sees Luismi with another man carrying a bundle to the vehicle. Yesenia informs the police of everything she saw, with the intention of having her cousin arrested.

Munra is arrested after Yesenia's statement, but he claims not to know anything about the matter. He recalls days earlier having taken Luismi with his wife, Norma, to the hospital after she began bleeding and running a fever. They both quickly flee after child welfare services discover that Norma is thirteen years old. The next day, Munra finds Luismi in the courtyard observing a small object covered in blood that is buried in a hole in the ground. Munra is convinced that it is a work of witchcraft. After picking up Brando, a friend of Luismi, they pay Munra to take them to the Witch. Munra has been uncomfortable around the Witch ever since he found out she is a transgender woman. Luismi and Brando enter her house, and half an hour later they exit carrying out a bundle wrapped in cloth. Munra decides not to ask and takes them to the outskirts of town, where the boys dump the bundle in a canal.

Norma originally arrived in La Matosa after fleeing her hometown, having become pregnant by her stepfather, who had raped her for years. Luismi finds her crying in a park and decides to take her home. The two begin a relationship, but Luismi almost never wants to have sex with her. When Chabela discovers that Norma is pregnant, she takes her to the Witch to give her a potion that will induce abortion. In the early morning, the pains are so strong that Norma crawls out of bed and has an abortion in the middle of the patio, which she buries in a hole. The days pass by and Norma's pain and bleeding do not stop, so she is taken to the hospital, where they discover that she is a minor. She is relentlessly reproached by the doctors, but she refuses to capitulate and incriminate Luismi.

Brando's father abandoned him and his mother when Brando was a child. Brando could not put up with his mother's strong religiosity, so he joined the group of older boys in town, with whom he began to drink and take drugs at the Witch's house. They teach him that the best way to make money is by having sex with homosexuals, but Brando claims to be repulsed by the idea. When Brando hears Luismi sing, he begins to have erotic thoughts about him. He discovers that Luismi had an affair with one of the men who paid him. One day, when the two of them are drunk, they end up having sex. The next morning Luismi does not say anything, and Brando becomes obsessed with the incident. He fears that Luismi would disclose their affair to others, so Brando imagines ways to murder Luismi.

Brando attacks the man with whom Luismi had a relationship. The man then disappears, leaving Luismi devastated. Months later, Luismi tells them that he now has a wife and that he plans to quit using drugs. Brando remains obsessed with Luismi and proposes that the two of them steal from the Witch, who supposedly has a stash of hidden treasure. Brando suggests escaping together, although in his mind he is still considering murdering Luismi. Luismi initially refuses, but after Norma's abortion he becomes convinced that everything is the work of the Witch. Luismi goes with Brando and Munra to her house, where they beat the Witch until Brando savagely kills her. They uncover no treasure, so they return home, where they are arrested hours later. The police beat Brando to get information out of him about the treasure, but he has nothing. Days later, Munra and Luismi are taken to the cell, both with signs of having been severely beaten. Brando, full of love and hatred, is there awaiting Luismi.

== Writing and structure ==
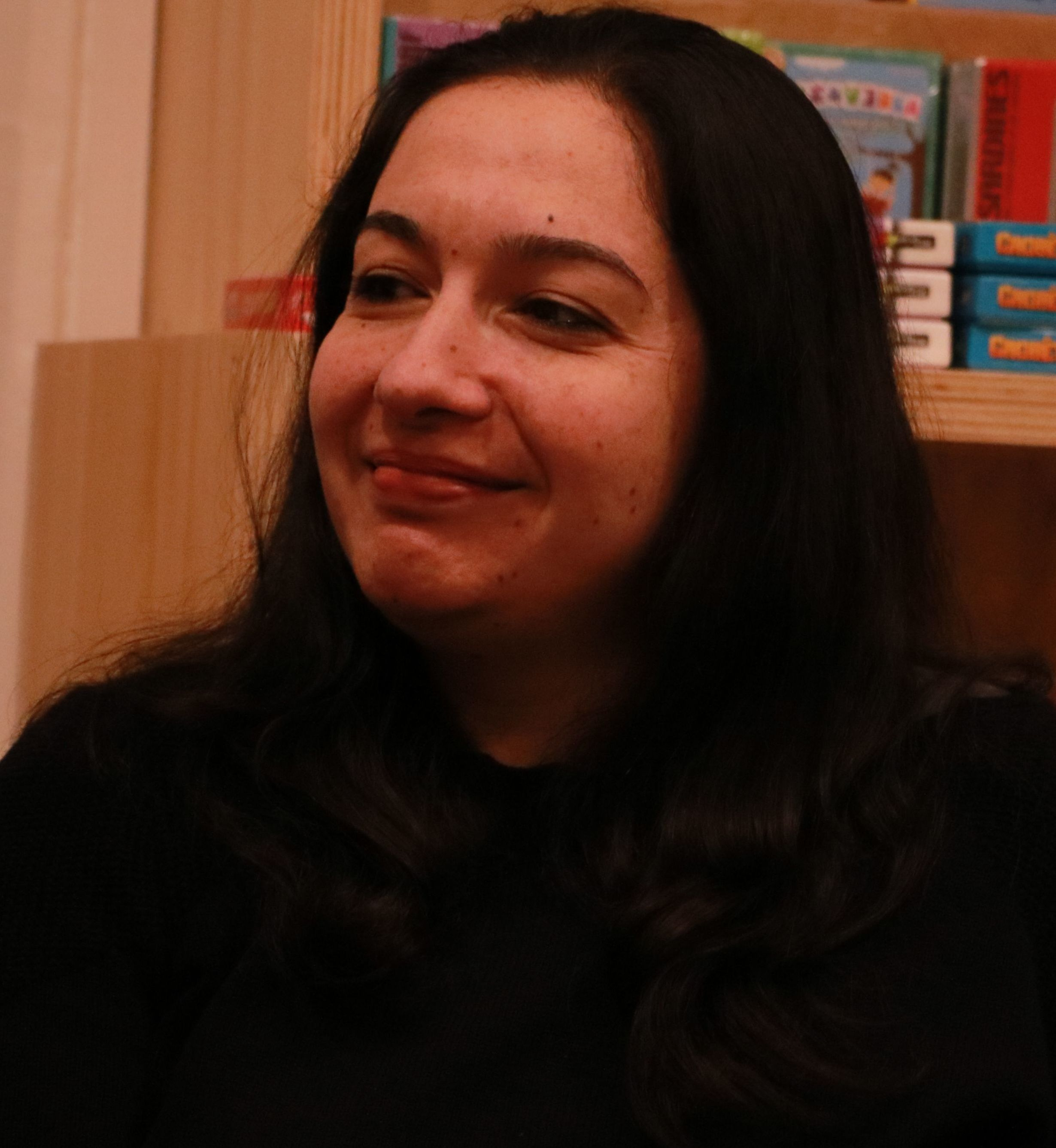
Fernanda Melchor in 2019

Melchor came up with the idea for the story after reading a crónica roja (crime report) about the murder of a woman whose body was discovered in a canal in rural Veracruz. The crime was committed by a man who claimed to have killed the woman because she attempted to bewitch him. Melchor initially planned to investigate the crime further and transform it into a non-fiction novel similar to the style of Truman Capote's In Cold Blood (1966). However, she chose not to pursue the non-fiction style due to the dangers of traveling and researching in areas with a strong presence of drug trafficking organizations. Melchor instead decided to explore the story through fiction.

The novel consists of eight chapters, the first and final two of which are relatively short in length. The other chapters are longer and feature detailed narration of several of the main characters of the novel. Each chapter focuses on one of the characters and their respective relationship with the murder of the Witch. The long chapters are made up of a single block of text without paragraph divisions and are written in a colloquial language that incorporates characteristics of the Mexican oral tradition. Melchor's narrative style was inspired by that of Gabriel García Márquez in his novel The Autumn of the Patriarch (1975), which Melchor mentions in the acknowledgements section of Hurricane Season.

Melchor decided on the novel's style and structure after writing the first two chapters, which spontaneously took on the form of an intense narrative without paragraph breaks. From this, she made it a "technical challenge" to maintain the same narrative style throughout the rest of the work. Melchor was in a "very pessimistic" state of mind while writing the novel due the violence, misogyny and homophobia plaguing the region at that time. Melchor says Hurricane Season is, as a whole, largely about "being young and having no future—and feeling this incredible urge to escape through any means possible."

== Reception ==
=== Critical response ===
The book was critically acclaimed, particularly for its portrayal of the issues of contemporary Mexico, receiving several mentions as one of the best books of the year. The Spanish writer Jorge Carrión, writing for The New York Times, included the novel in his list of the best Ibero-American books of 2017 and described its style as "virtuous, oppressive."

The Mexican novelist Antonio Ortuño, writing for Letras Libres, gave the novel a positive review, characterizing it as a "grand narrative, ambitious, rotund" and praising in particular Melchor's incorporation of Mexican slang and her exploration of the realities of Mexico. These same characteristics were praised by Bolivian writer Edmundo Paz Soldán in his review for La Tercera, in which he wrote that within Melchor's prose "the profanity, the desire to name the obscene and the scatalogical, are revealed in all their explosive beauty." Paz Soldán also singled out the chapter focusing on Norma's relationship with her stepfather Pepe as being the best in the novel. Meanwhile, Dalia Cristerna, writing for El Universal, described the novel as a testimony to the violence, corruption and poverty experienced by marginalized sectors of society.

The review in The Guardian, written by Anthony Cummins, described the novel as "intense and inventive" and as "a brutal portrait of small-town claustrophobia, in which machismo is a prison and corruption isn't just institutional but domestic." Cummins referred largely to the violence of the plot, which he called "near-dystopian", principally in the treatment received by women in relation to the powers reserved men. These characteristics were also highlighted in the review by Kirkus Reviews, who called it "tough stuff but not gratuitously so." The review particularly praised the "two virtuoso chapters" which focus on Norma and Brando as underscoring "the depth of feeling and disquieting intensity Melchor is capable of." Regarding Melchor, Kirkus Reviews concluded that she has "deep reserves of talent and nerve."

Melchor's treatment of violence in the novel was a consistent emphasis by the majority of critics. Amanda Dennis, in a review written in the Los Angeles Review of Books, asserted that several of the scenes were so brutal that they made Truman Capote and Cormac McCarthy seem tame. Dennis also proclaimed that it was precisely Melchor's "willingness to explode a violent act into multiple perspectives, to look at it again and again from different angles (perpetrator, bystander, accomplice)" that made the novel "feel weightier than most contemporary fiction." The review of The New York Times, written by Julian Lucas, called the novel "impressive", referring to the murder of the Witch as an event that Melchor "captures in language as though distilling venom."

=== Awards and nominations ===
Angelica Ammar's German translation of the novel, titled Saison der Wirbelstürme, won the 2019 International Literature Award. In its decision, the jury stated that Melchor wrote "the novel of poverty in twenty-first century global capitalism, the novel of poverty born of violence against women, against homosexuals, against those who are weaker. The novel of the merciless struggle of the weakest against the even weaker and against themselves."

The novel was shortlisted for the 2020 International Booker Prize and the 2021 Dublin Literary Award. It was also longlisted for the 2020 National Book Award for Translated Literature.

At the end of 2019, the Spanish newspaper El País ranked Hurricane Season as 28th on its list of the 100 best books of the 21st century. Likewise, The New York Times in 2024 ranked the novel as 82nd on its list of the 100 best books of the 21st century.

== Publication history ==
- Temporada de huracanes (in Spanish). Mexico City: Literatura Random House. April 2017. ISBN 978-607-31-5273-0.
- Saison der Wirbelstürme (in German). Translated by Ammar, Angelica. Berlin: Verlag Klaus Wagenbach. 2019. ISBN 978-3-8031-3307-6.
- La saison des ouragans (in French). Translated by Alcoba, Laura. Grasset. 20 March 2019. ISBN 978-2-2468-1569-3.
- Orkaanseizoen (in Dutch). Translated by Peperkamp, Bart. Amsterdam: Wereldbibliotheek. 2020. ISBN 978-90-284-2779-2.
- Hurricane Season. Translated by Hughes, Sophie. London: Fitzcarraldo Editions. 19 February 2020. ISBN 978-1-913097-09-7.
- Hurrikánok évada (in Hungarian). Translated by Vajdics, Anikó. Budapest: Európa. 2022. ISBN 978-963-504-566-2.
- Temporada de Furacões (in Portuguese). Translated by Xerxenesky, Antônio. São Paulo: Mundaréu. 2020. ISBN 978-65-87955-01-8.
- Время ураганов (in Russian). Translated by Bogdanovsky, Aleksandr Sergeyevich. Inspiria. 2021. ISBN 978-5-04-122496-7.
- Сезонът на ураганите (in Bulgarian). Translated by Omaynikov, Zakhari. Labirint. 2023. ISBN 978-6-19-767029-5.

== Film adaptation ==
In April 2022, a film adaptation of Hurricane Season was announced by Netflix. Produced by Mexico's Woo Films, the screenplay was written by Elisa Miller and Daniela Gómez, with Miller directing. Principal photography began in mid 2022. After its premiere at the Morelia International Film Festival, the film became available on the platform in November 2023.
