= Layla Martínez =

- Born: 1987 (age 38–39); Madrid, Spain
- Education: Complutense University of Madrid, University of Alcalá
- Occupations: Writer and columnist
- Writing career
- Language: Spanish
- Genres: horror, poetry
- Notable works: Surrogate Pregnancy (2019); Utopia Is Not an Island (2020); Woodworm (2021)

Layla Martínez (Madrid, 1987) is a Spanish writer and columnist known for her horror novel Woodworm, as well as the essay Utopia Is Not an Island.

== Biography ==
She was born in 1987 in Madrid to a family from Cuenca. She graduated with a degree in political science from the Complutense University of Madrid and later gained a master's degree in sexology from the University of Alcalá.

In 2012, she published The Book of Cruelty (El libro de la crueldad), a book of poems; in 2015 she released The Songs of the Sleepers (Las canciones de los durmientes). In 2018, she won the José Ángel Valente Faculty Poetry Prize for her work Cineraria.

In 2020, she published the essay Utopia Is Not an Island (Utopía no es una isla), which reflects on the relationship between the way a society imagines the future and the cultural products that it consumes.

In 2021, she published Carcoma (translated into English as Woodworm by Sophie Hughes and Annie McDermott in 2024). This novel examines themes of gender-based and class-based violence through horror, set in the time of the Spanish Civil War. The work was a finalist for Semana Negra de Gijón's Celsius Prize for Spanish-language science fiction and fantasy and won her an award as the best new Spanish-language author of the year at Festival 42 in 2022.

She has also written for periodicals such as elDiario.es, Público, and El Salto. She is the co-director of Antipersona, an independent publisher.

== Works ==
- The Book of Cruelty (El libro de la cruelidad, 2012)
- The Songs of the Sleepers (Las canciones de los durmientes, 2015)
- Cineraria (2019)
- Utopia Is Not an Island (Utopía no es una isla, 2020)
- Woodworm (Carcoma, 2021; English translation 2024)
