= Alia Trabucco Zerán =

Chilean writer (born 1983)

- Born: Alia Trabucco Zerán; August 26, 1983 (age 43); Santiago, Chile
- Occupation: Author
- Notable work: La Resta (The Remainder)

Alia Trabucco Zerán (born 26 August 1983) is a Chilean writer.

She has an MFA in creative writing in Spanish from New York University and a PhD in Spanish and Latin American studies from University College London.

Her debut novel La Resta (The Remainder) was critically acclaimed and won the 2014 Chilean Council for the Arts prize for Best Unpublished Literary Work. In 2015, it was chosen by El País as one of the ten best debut novels that year. It was translated into English by Sophie Hughes and published by And Other Stories in 2018. The Remainder was shortlisted for the 2019 Man Booker International Prize.

Her book When Women Kill was a finalist for the 2023 National Book Critics Circle award in criticism. and winner of the 2022 British Academy Book Prize for Global Cultural Understanding. Her latest book is Limpia ("Clean").

== Early life ==
Born in Santiago, Chile, her father is Sergio Trabucco, a filmmaker, her mother Faride Zerán, is the Former President of the National Television Council of Chile and is of Palestinian and Syrian descent.

== Selected works ==
=== Original publications ===
- 2015: La Resta. Madrid: Demipage.
- 2019: Las Homicidas. Santiago: Lumen.
- 2022: Limpia. Santiago: Lumen.

=== Translated ===
- Trabucco Zerán, Alia (2018) [2015]. The Remainder. Translated by Sophie Hughes. Original title La Resta (paperback ed.). Sheffield: And Other Stories. ISBN 9781911508328.
- Trabucco Zerán, Alia (2019) [2015]. The Remainder. Translated by Sophie Hughes. Original title La Resta (paperback ed.). Minneapolis: Coffee House Press. ISBN 9781566895507.
- Trabucco Zerán, Alia (2022) [2019]. When Women Kill: Four Crimes Retold. Translated by Sophie Hughes. Original title Las Homicidas. And Other Stories. ISBN 9781913505264.
- Trabucco Zerán, Alia (2022) [2019]. When Women Kill: Four Crimes Retold. Translated by Sophie Hughes. Original title Las Homicidas (paperback ed.). Coffee House Press. ISBN 9781566896337.
- Trabucco Zerán, Alia (2024) [2022]. Clean. Translated by Sophie Hughes. Original title Limpia. Penguin. ISBN 9780593850510.
