= Laia Jufresa =

Mexican writer

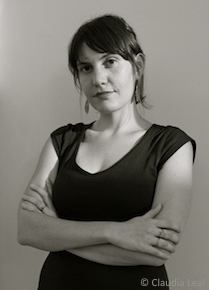
Image of Laia Jefresa

Laia Jufresa (born 1983) is a Mexican writer. She was born in Mexico City and grew up in Veracruz and Paris. She studied at the Sorbonne, graduating with a BA in Arts. She also lived in Mexico City, Buenos Aires, Madison, U.S., and Cologne, Germany. She is best known for her debut novel Umami, which has been translated into multiple languages. In 2017, she was named as one of the Bogota39, a list of the most promising young writers in Latin America.

When she was only six, she moved to a rural area in Mexico where she began to read avidly, especially English books that her grandfather sent her. Later she lived in France, Spain, Argentina, and Germany.

She took a master's degree in illustration. In Mexico, she studied at Mario Bellatin's Escuela Dinámica de Escritores (Dynamic School of Writers) and was awarded two grants for young writers from the Fundación para las Letras Mexicanas (the Foundation for Mexican Literature) and the FONCA (the National Fund for Culture and the Arts). Her work has been in anthologies such as Un nuevo modo, Antología de narrativa mexicana actual (A new way, Anthology of Mexican current narrative, UNAM, 2013), Muestra de literatura joven de México (Sample of young literature of Mexico, FLM, 2008) and Los mejores Poemas Mexicanos 2006 (The Best Mexican Poems 2006). Her book El esquinista (The cornerist) was awarded an honorable mention in the National Prize for Short Story San Luis Potosí 2012.

== Literary works ==
Umami. This novel is an interwoven story told from the perspective of neighbors living in a mews of five houses in Mexico City. The five houses are named after tastes: Sweet, Salty, Bitter, Sour, and Umami. Umami tells the stories of characters who are dealing with mortality, abandonment, and loss.

El esquinista ("The Cornerist") was translated from Spanish by Sophie Hughes. This is a collection of stories written from 2004 and 2010, with the help of grants from FONCA and the Foundation for Mexican Literature. It includes "El esquinista", "Mama contra la Tierra", "Moud", "Eusebio Moneda" and "Los enganos".
