= Ivana Sajko =

Croatian playwright, novelist and theater director

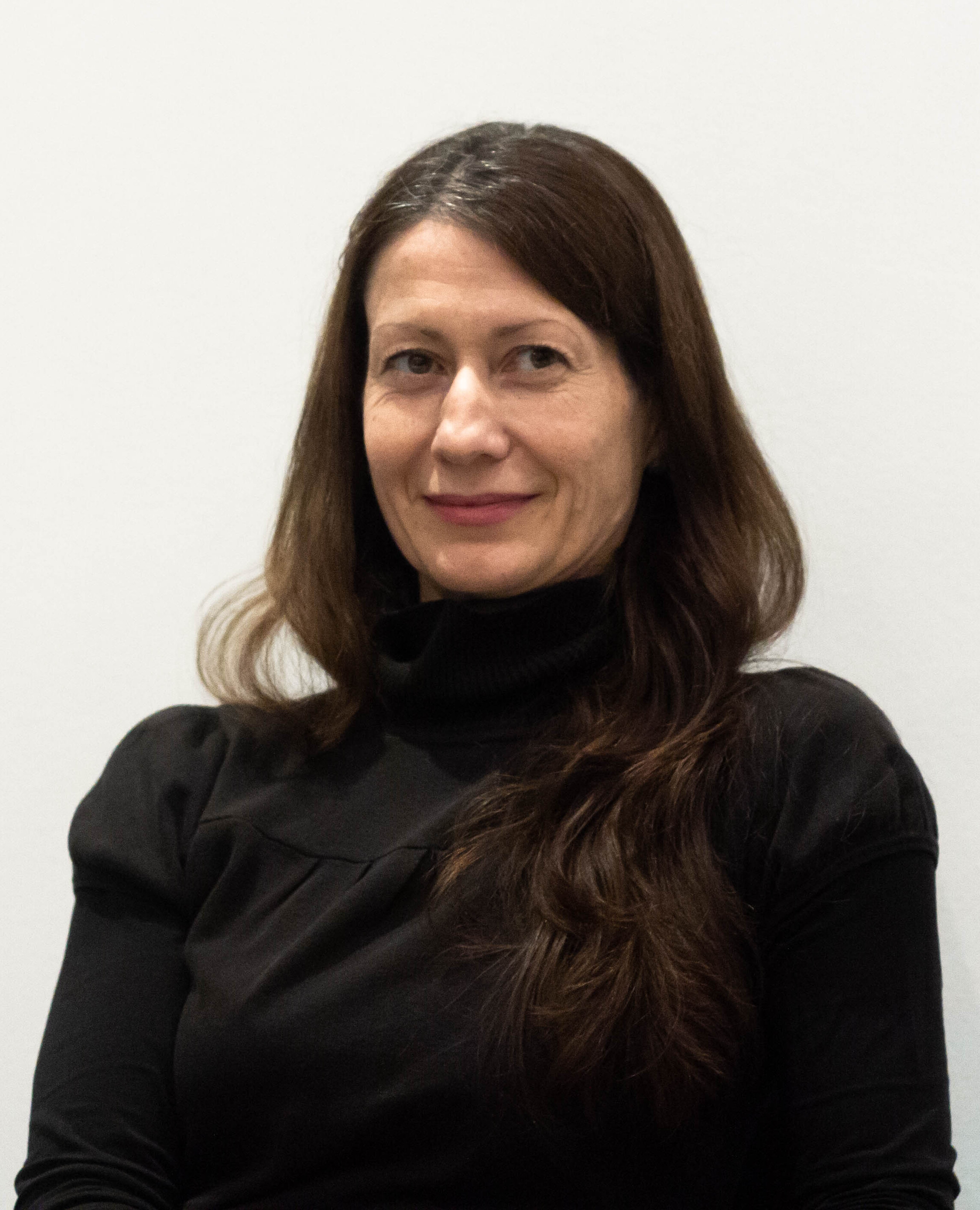
- Born: 1975 (age 50–51); Zagreb, SFR Yugoslavia
- Occupations: Dramaturge, playwright, novelist, theatrical director

Ivana Sajko (born 1975) is a Croatian playwright, novelist, and theater director. Her work, predominantly in the field of contemporary theatre and literature, is recognized for addressing socio-political themes, often influenced by her experiences and observations of contemporary society. Sajko's plays and novels are known for their exploration of complex societal issues and their innovative narrative structure.

== Early life and education ==
Born and raised in Zagreb, Sajko pursued an education in dramaturgy at the Academy of Dramatic Arts at Zagreb University. She later obtained a master's degree in literature from the Faculty of Humanities and Social Sciences at the same university.

== Career ==
Sajko's career in the arts began with her debut work, "Naranča u oblacima" ("Orange in the Clouds"), which was recognized with Croatia's state prize for dramatic texts in 1998. Her body of work includes several novels and numerous theatre pieces. She co-founded the performance collective BadCompany in Zagreb in 2000, where she served as a dramaturg and director until 2005. Her later works predominantly consist of staging her own dramas, exploring the interplay between dramatic text and stage execution, and addressing themes such as war, societal conflicts, and human emotions.

Her play "Woman Bomb" is particularly noted for its critical engagement with socio-political themes. Sajko's work is characterized by its exploration of moral and practical issues, often challenging societal norms and structures.

Sajko's other notable theatrical works include "Archetype: Medea" and "Europa – Monologue for Mother Courage and Her Children." Her novel "Love Novel" ("Liebesroman") received the Internationaler Literaturpreis (International Literature Award) in 2018 for its German translation. The novel examines themes of love and conflict within the context of late capitalism.

In addition to her theatrical productions, Sajko has been involved in various editorial and academic roles. She has served as a guest lecturer at the Academy of Dramatic Art in Zagreb, an editor of the performance art magazine "Frakcija" and the literary magazine "Tema," and hosted a TV show on contemporary theatre, "V-efekt." In 2017, she signed the Declaration on the Common Language of the Croats, Serbs, Bosniaks and Montenegrins.

Her play "Rose is a rose is a rose is a rose" was commissioned for the Steirischer Herbst festival in 2008 and premiered with the Wunderbaum theatre group. Another play, "Scenes with an apple," was commissioned for the Stadtheater Bern, premiering in 2009 under the direction of Dora Schneider. Additionally, her text "Introduction to Disjunction" was part of the project "The Encyclopedia of Unlived Life" by Marian Pensotti, commissioned for the Steirischer Herbst Festival 2010. She also collaborated with composer David Simons in 2004 to publish the music CD "Mass for election day silence."

=== Style and themes ===
Sajko's work is characterized by its examination of social and political themes. She often employs language and monologues to challenge traditional theatre representations. Her narratives frequently explore female perspectives and societal issues.

=== Recognition ===
Sajko has been recognized with awards such as the Chevalier de l’ordre des Arts et Lettres and the Internationaler Literaturpreis. She participated in the DAAD Artists-in-Berlin Program in 2016/2017.

== Bibliography ==
=== Novels ===
- Rio Bar (2006)
- My Family History from 1941 to 1991 and Beyond (2009)
- Love Novel (Ljubavni roman, 2015)
- Little Deaths (Male smrti, 2021)
- Every Time We Say Goodbye, translated by Mima Simić. (Biblioasis, 2026) ISBN 978-1-77196-688-7

=== Plays and collections ===
- 23rd Cat (1996)
- Orange in the Clouds (1998)
- Reconstruction – Comical Funeral of the First Sentence (1998)
- Walking Along the Surface (1999)
- 4 Dry Feet (1999)
- Archetype: Medea – Monologue for a Woman that Sometimes Speaks (2000)
- Rib Cage (2000)
- Streetwalkers (2001)
- Decapitated Faces (Smaknuta lica, 2001)
- Mass for Election-day Silence, Dead Body Behind the Wall & Hoofs in the Throat (2002)
- Woman Bomb (2003)
- Europa – Monologue for Mother Courage and Her Children (2004)
- Rose is a rose is a rose is a rose (2008)
- Scenes with an apple (2009)
- Introduction to Disjunction (2010)
- The Disobedience Trilogy (Trilogija o neposluhu, 2012)

=== Other works ===
- Towards Madness (and Revolution): A Reading (Prema ludilu (i revoluciji): čitanje, 2006)
