= Amir Hassan Cheheltan =

Iranian writer (born 1956)

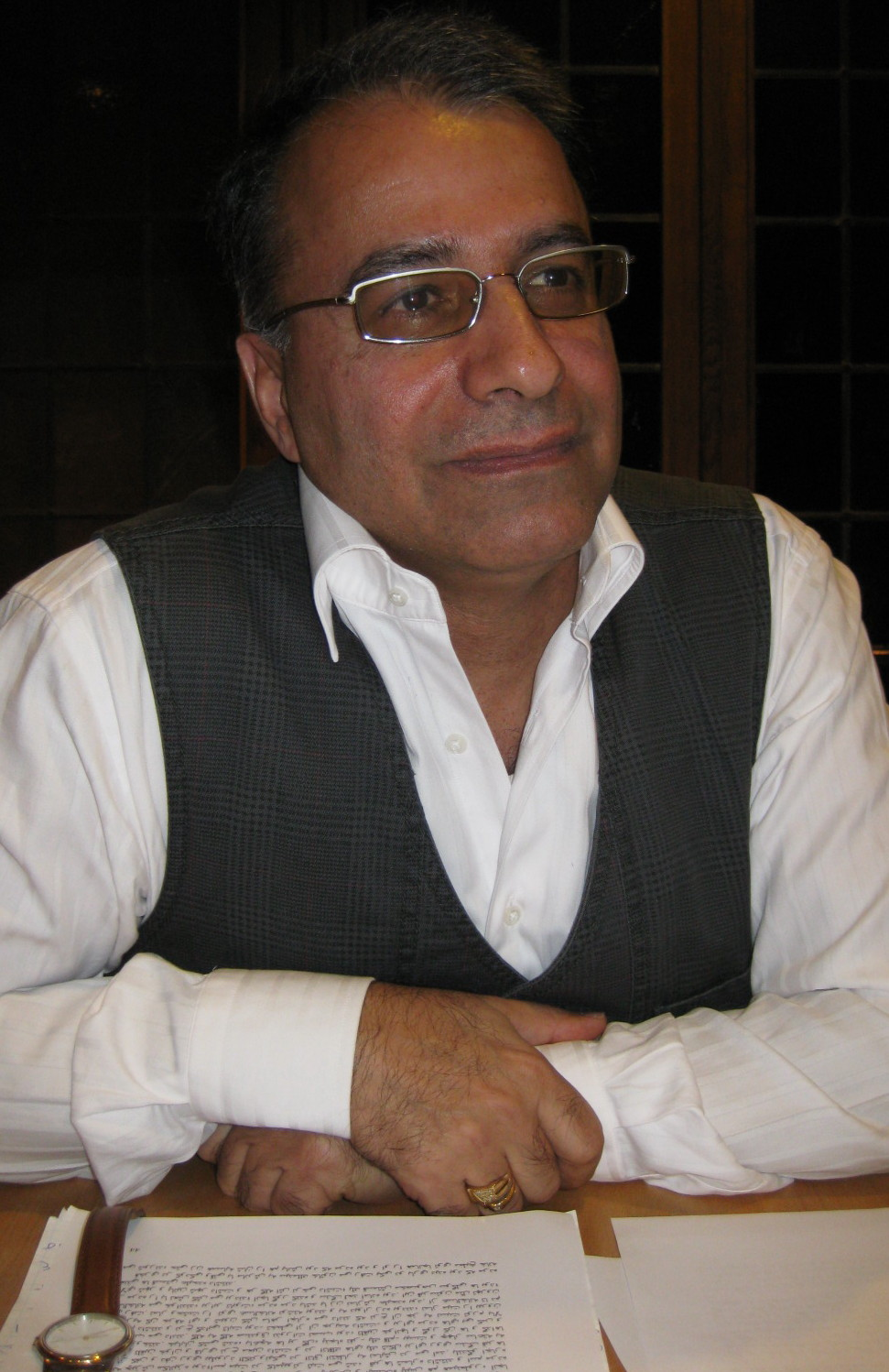
Amir Hassan Cheheltan

Amir Hassan Cheheltan (Persian: امیرحسن چهل‌تن); (born 1956) is an Iranian writer. He has published 12 novels, six volumes of short stories and a screenplay of which are banned in Iran. Many are translated into English, German, Italian, Norwegian, Lithuanian, Arabic and Hebrew.

== Life ==
Cheheltan was born in Tehran in 1956 to parents with an interest in classical Persian literature. After graduating from a mathematics high school, he studied electrical engineering and after the Iranian Revolution of 1979, he left Iran for Great Britain to keep studying. After his studies he served in the military during the Iran Iraq war.

== Literary career ==
His first work was a collection of stories, Sigheh (Temporary Wife), released in 1976. Later he wrote his first novel, The Mourning of Qassem, which was only to be published in 2003, twenty years after it was completed. Due to a difficult situation for the country's intellectuals, he fled Iran in 1999 and only returned two years later. He has been a guest at the International Literature Festival of Berlin for several years and his essays have been published in German newspapers such as the Frankfurter Allgemeine Zeitung and Süddeutsche Zeitung. He has received scholarships from the German Heinrich Böll Foundation, the Ledig House in Belgium and the Villa Aurora in California.

== Works ==
=== novels ===
- The Mourning of Qassem, Now, Tehran 1984
- Hall of Mirrors, Beh-negar, Tehran, 1991
- Tehran, City without Sky, Negah, Tehran, 2002
- Love and the Incomplete Woman, Negah, Tehran, 2003.
- Iranian Dawn, Negah, Tehran, 2005
- Tehran, Revolution Street, Kirchheim, München, 2009
- American Killing in Tehran, C.H. Beck, München, 2011
- The Calligrapher of Isfahan, C.H. Beck, München, 2015
- The Persistent Parrot, Matthes & Seitz, Berlin, 2018
- The Circle of Literature Lovers, C.H. Beck, München, 2020
- A love in Cairo, C.H. Beck, München, 2022

=== short stories ===
- Temporary Wife, Bu-ali, Tehran, 1976
- Relic-cloth on the Shrine's Steel Grillwork, Rawagh, Tehran, 1978
- No One Called me Anymore, Negah, Tehran, 1993
- Not Long remains till Tomorrow, Negah, Tehran, 1998
- Five O'clock is too Late to Die, Negah, Tehran, 2002
- Several Unbelievable Truths, Negah, Tehran, 2017

== Awards ==
- International Literature Award for The Circle of Literature Lovers in 2021
