= Fitzcarraldo Editions =

British book publisher

- Status: Active
- Founded: 2014; 12 years ago
- Founder: Jacques Testard
- Country of origin: United Kingdom
- Headquarters location: Deptford, London
- Distribution: Grantham Book Services
- Publication types: Fiction; Essays
- Official website: fitzcarraldoeditions.com

Fitzcarraldo Editions is an independent British book publisher based in Deptford, London, specialising in literary fiction, poetry and long-form essays in both translation and English-language originals. It focuses on experimental, ambitious, imaginative, and innovative writing by little-known and neglected authors. Fitzcarraldo Editions currently publishes twenty-two titles a year. Four of Fitzcarraldo's authors have gone on to win the Nobel Prize in Literature: Svetlana Alexievich (2015), Olga Tokarczuk (2018), Annie Ernaux (2022) and Jon Fosse (2023).

== History ==
Fitzcarraldo Editions was founded in 2014 when Jacques Testard bought the English-language rights to Second-Hand Time by Svetlana Alexievich for £3,500 at the Frankfurt Book Fair. Alexievich later won the Nobel Prize, netting a "six-figure" sum for the publisher. The name comes from the 1982 Werner Herzog film Fitzcarraldo.

The books are designed by Ray O'Meara, using a custom serif typeface called Fitzcarraldo. The books are known for their minimalist design, with fiction titles deploying plain covers in International Klein Blue with white text and non-fiction using the reverse: white covers with text in International Klein Blue. Poetry features the same blue as an inner border and black text against a white cover.

Fitzcarraldo Editions publishes the work of Svetlana Alexievich, Alejandro Zambra, Sheila Heti, Mathias Énard, Annie Ernaux, Joshua Cohen, Alaa Abd el-Fattah, Olga Tokarczuk, Jon Fosse, Fernanda Melchor, Ian Penman, Joanna Pocock, Jeremy Cooper, Vincenzo Latronico, and Paul B. Preciado, among other authors.

Along with New Directions Publishing and Giramondo Publishing, Fitzcarraldo Editions hosts the Novel Prize, a biennial award for a book-length work of literary fiction written in English by published and unpublished writers. Fitzcarraldo Editions also hosts the annual Essay Prize, in conjunction with Mahler & LeWitt Studios.

The company's logo shows a bell with the letters F and Z, and relates to the film Fitzcarraldo; it has been described as "a nod to the challenges and commitment necessary to run a successful independent press" with "a play on early printers marks, with the initials F and Z, recalling the symbols of the earliest printed books".

The company's founder Jacques Testard has been quoted as saying: "Each of the books we publish is a singular work, but also forms a link in a single chain....Connections exist between them, whether stylistic, thematic, or formal – and, hopefully, not just in my head."
