= Ulysses syndrome =

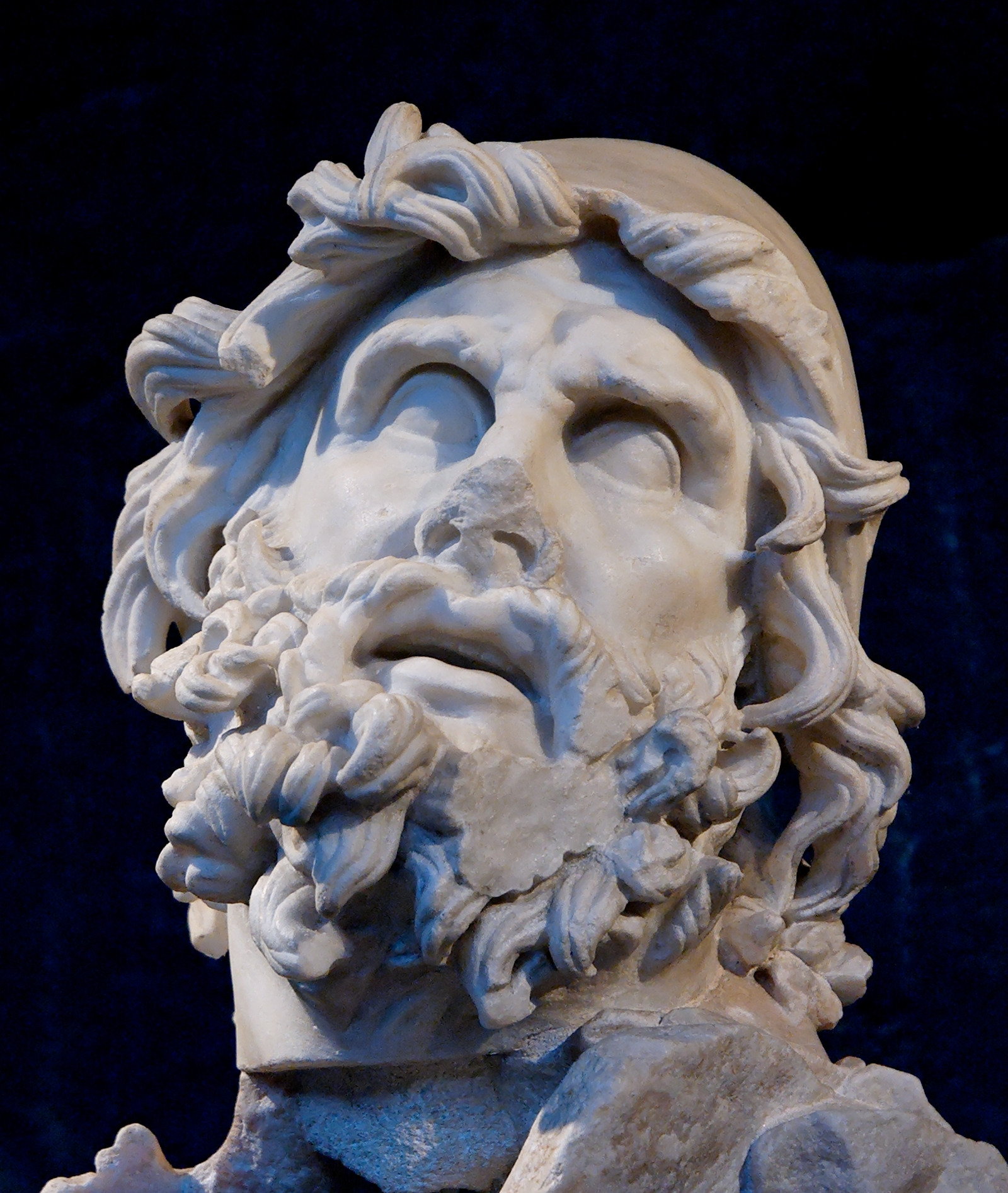
- Odysseus (Ulysses in Latin)
- Specialty: Psychiatry

Ulysses syndrome (immigrant syndrome of chronic and multiple stress) is an atypical set of depressive, anxious, dissociative, and somatoform symptoms that results from being exposed to extreme levels of stress unique to the process of modern migration. Rather than a mental disorder, this syndrome is a natural reaction to toxic levels of stress seen in migrants who are otherwise in normal mental health.

== Signs and symptoms ==
The Ulysses syndrome has both physical and psychological symptoms. These include migraines, insomnia, recurrent worrying, tension, nervousness, irritability, disorientation, fear, fatigue, sadness, gastric pain, bone pain, low self-esteem, increased tobacco and alcohol consumption, and decreased productivity. A lack of social support or access to appropriate medical care may aggravate these symptoms. In some occasions, patients with Ulysses syndrome are mistakenly diagnosed with another medical condition which can further impede recovery.

== Causes ==
Syrian and Iraqi refugees arriving in Lesvos, Greece (2015)

Migration in the 21st century has occurred in the context of unprecedented volatility, conflict, and suffering. There are currently more forcibly displaced individuals in the world than at any other time in history, including 22.5 million refugees, 40.3 million internally displaced peoples, and 2.8 million asylum-seekers in 2016. Forced migration has profound impacts on individuals and families as their lives change suddenly and dramatically. Experiences of modern migrants include the separation of families, dissolution of communities by conflict and disaster, exposure to exploitation, and violence. Migrants remain in prolonged periods of displacement with a median time of four years in exile.

Migrants often face multiple forms of uniquely intense stressors, such as the death of loved ones, lack of jobs and social support, difficulties in the migratory process, and loss of status and identity. Because many migrants lack access to healthcare in the receiving country, they are often unable to receive appropriate care and continually re-experience the mental trauma of these losses. The cumulative effect may create stress levels so intense that they exceed individuals' adaptive capacities and lead to a failure of the acculturation process. This aggravates other symptoms, including depression, anxiety, headaches, and pain.

Extreme stressors that put individuals at risk for Ulysses syndrome, called "Ulysses stressors", can broadly be characterized into four categories:

- Forced loneliness:
  - Separation from family and homeland, especially if the immigrant left his or her spouse and children behind
  - Social and cultural isolation due to lack of language proficiency or familiar cultural and religious institutions
  - Racial discrimination and prejudice in the receiving country
- Failure of migratory goals:
  - Sense of failure of original reasons for emigration
  - Pressure to earn enough money to support family back in the home country
  - Lack of opportunities to acquire appropriate legal documentation, obtain work permits, and secure non-exploitative quality jobs
  - Poor access to housing and health services,
- Dangers of the journey:
  - Crowded rafts and boats without life jackets
  - Fear of arrest and deportation
  - Physical and sexual abuse
- Struggle to survive:
  - Difficulties procuring basic necessities such as food, water, and shelter

Middle-aged and elderly adults are typically more strongly affected than younger people are because they experience a larger loss of status and social mobility, have fewer encounters with people outside of the community through school or work, and are less likely to be exposed to the receiving country's mainstream culture. Moreover, older immigrants typically have greater difficulty learning the receiving country's language, which may substantially impair their ability to understand and interact with the new culture.

== Diagnosis ==
Ulysses syndrome is not a mental disorder, but rather a normal stress response by a healthy individual to an extreme situation that overwhelms the normal psychological mechanisms for coping. By definition, this syndrome cannot be diagnosed if another mental disorder is present. There is currently no DSM-5 criteria for this syndrome.

Although often falsely recognized as acute stress disorder, depression, adjustment disorder, or other mental disorders, Ulysses syndrome differs from these pathologies in important ways:

- Acute stress disorder: Ulysses syndrome is brought about by chronic exposure to toxic stress, whereas the symptoms of acute stress disorder by definition are limited to one month.
- Depression: Although depressed mood is common, Ulysses syndrome does not include many other cardinal symptoms of depression such as apathy or thoughts of death. Immigrants, unlike people suffering from depression, have the motivation to go forward and struggle in order to reunite with their families and have a better life, despite their current difficulties, and do not lose their interests. Rather, they try to maintain their social and professional activities.
- Adjustment disorder: One of the central diagnostic criteria for adjustment disorder is distress that is out of proportion to the severity or intensity of the stressor or stressors. On the other hand, Ulysses syndrome is an appropriate response that manifests as anxiety, insomnia, sadness, etc., precisely due to the extreme nature of the stressors. Moreover, deterioration of social and occupational functioning, which is often present in adjustment disorder, does not occur in Ulysses syndrome.
- Post-traumatic stress disorder: Both PTSD and Ulysses syndrome stem from a response to fear. However, disturbing thoughts or feelings about traumatic events as well as distress and avoidance of trauma-related cues do not occur in Ulysses syndrome, but does in PTSD, whereas stressors such as social isolation, lack of opportunities, discrimination, and prejudice are common for Ulysses syndrome and not for PTSD.

Although clinically distinct from mental health disorders, Ulysses syndrome exists on a spectrum between normal and disease. It can be understood as the extreme limit of normal mental functioning that can still be considered non-pathological. However, an individual with Ulysses syndrome is at greater risk of disease and indeed, at a certain point the stressors may become too intense such that a true clinical mental disorder such as depression or PTSD can develop.

== Treatment ==
Because Ulysses syndrome is a stress response rather than a mental disorder, the natural response for an individual is to return to his or her normal state of health once the stressors are eliminated. Dr. Achotegui, who first described Ulysses syndrome, makes the analogy to a stalk of bamboo that bends in the wind. Just like bamboo will bend but not break, those who are exposed to Ulysses stressors are brought to the brink of mental instability and are made more vulnerable to mental disorders, but do not have a disorder yet. When the wind subsides, the bamboo will spring back to its normal state, just as those who face these stressors will return to their normal selves if and when the stressors resolve.

Preventive measures that may help reduce Ulysses syndrome generally revolve around building mental resilience, such as finding closure after losing loved ones, embracing changes in identity as an opportunity for growth, talking with others who have undergone similar experiences, re-evaluating expectations to be more realistic, and learning to live in the present rather than dwell too deeply in nostalgia.

One proposed therapy leverages the ability of community health workers CHWs) to connect with hard to reach populations such as displaced migrants. CHWs better understand the local culture and traditions and may, with the appropriate training, be able to engage affected individuals more effectively. For instance, CHWs can often better advocate for migrant rights and connect migrant populations to the resources necessary to facilitate integration and build community, all of which helps reduce the extreme stressors that lead to Ulysses syndrome.

== History ==
Dr. Joseba Achotegui from the Universitat de Barcelona coined the term Ulysses syndrome in 2002. It was named after the ancient Greek hero, Odysseus (Ulysses in Latin), who suffered involuntary migration and travelled for 10 years through the Mediterranean to come back home from the decade-long Trojan War. The hardships of his journey are compared to the ones of contemporary migrants, who must struggle with intensely stressful, novel situations in isolation and with little help. Scarcity of their resources makes it impossible to cope with and successfully adapt to the unfamiliar environment of the receiving country, which in turn leads to experiencing a range of detrimental symptoms.

There are accounts that cited the Canadian Mercer Rang as the originator of the term. However, Rang described a different condition in 1972, one that is characterized by ill or side effects of extensive diagnostic investigations because of a false-positive result of laboratory screening. Here, the patient is likened to Ulysses as he embarks on a journey that brings more suffering than he had to begin with.

== Alternative use of Ulysses syndrome ==
The term Ulysses syndrome has alternatively been used to refer to the psychological and physical sequelae of misdiagnosis due to a false positive result. For instance, a patient who complains of low risk chest pain may be referred for further cardiac work-up by an overcautious physician. These tests in turn may give a positive result due to high sensitivity, which subjects the patient to further testing that ultimately proves to be unnecessary. Victims of this condition experience the stress of being diagnosed with a condition they do not have as well as the physical trauma of invasive testing.

There is currently no consensus on the definitive use of the term “Ulysses syndrome”. Nevertheless, Ulysses syndrome as it is used to describe the effects of chronic extreme stress in migrant populations is more in line with the definition of a syndrome as used in the medical field, i.e. a set of signs and symptoms that constitute a disease. Moreover, because migrants who experience chronic stress and fear are frequently incorrectly diagnosed with depression or anxiety, it encapsulates the alternative definition of this condition.
