= Nastassja Martin =

French anthropologist

Nastassja Martin (born 1986) is a French anthropologist and essayist. She specialises in the populations of the Far North.

Martin is known for her story Croire aux fauves (In the Eye of the Wild) in which she describes her attack by a bear.

== Biography ==
Martin was born in Grenoble. She studied anthropology at the École des hautes études en sciences sociales.

Martin joined the Gwich'in, a hunter-gatherer society, in Alaska, to complete a thesis under the supervision of Philippe Descola.

In 2016, she published Wild Souls, the story of her experience in Alaska with this population.

In August 2015, while she was in the mountains of Kamchatka, on the borders of Siberia, to carry out an anthropological study among the Evenes, Nastassja Martin was attacked by a bear. The animal disfigured her, and she lost a piece of her jaw. Months of hospitalization followed in Russia, then in Paris. Based on this experience, she wrote a story, Croire aux fauves, which was released in October 2019. It recounts her encounter with the bear, her recovery and her animist vision of the world.

In 2020, she took part in a committee against a project to extend the ski area to La Grave and the Massif des Écrins.

Since then, she has published several other books, such as À l'est des rêves, which came out in 2022, and which details her anthropological approach.

== Bibliography ==
- Les Âmes sauvages: face à l'Occident, la résistance d’un peuple d’Alaska, Paris, La Découverte, 2016. ISBN 9782072849787
- Croire aux fauves, Paris, Verticales, 2019, ISBN 9782707189578
  - In the Eye of the Wild translator Sophie R. Lewis. New York Review Books, 2021. ISBN 978-1-68137-585-4
- À l'Est des rêves, La Découverte, 2022. ISBN 9782359251241
- Les sources de glace, Paris, Paulsen, 2025. ISBN 978-2-35221-554-7
- L'amont des sources, Paris, Paulsen, 2025. ISBN 978-2-35221-599-8
