= Fernanda Melchor =

Mexican novelist (born 1982)

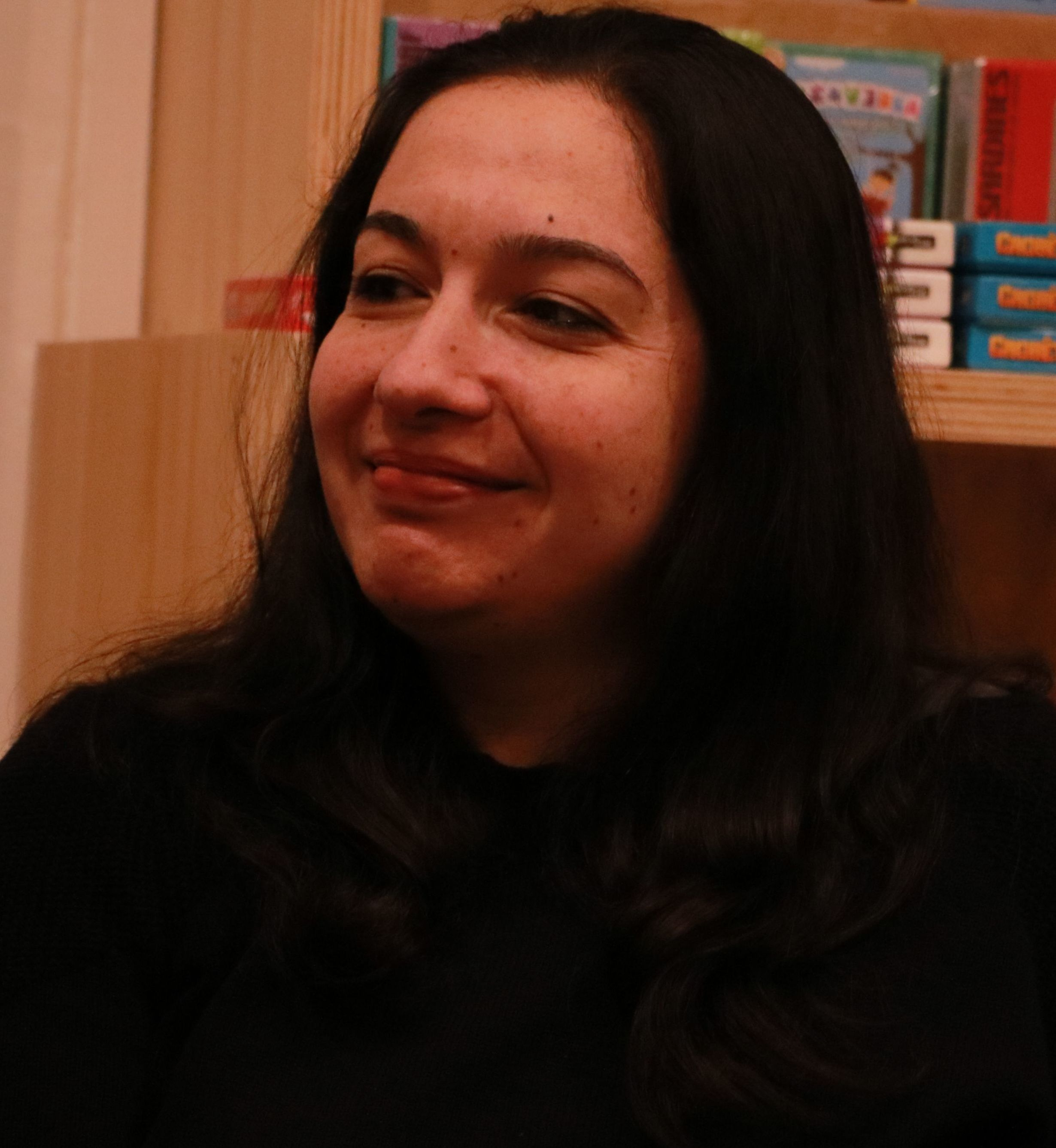
- Melchor in 2019
- Born: 1982 (age 43–44); Veracruz, Mexico
- Education: Universidad Veracruzana
- Occupation: Novelist
- Writing career
- Genre: Literary fiction
- Notable works: Hurricane Season, Paradais
- Notable awards: International Literature Award; Anna Seghers Prize; Ryszard Kapuściński Award

Fernanda Melchor (born 1982, Veracruz, Mexico) is a Mexican writer best known for her 2017 novel Hurricane Season for which she won the 2019 Anna Seghers Prize and a place on the shortlist for the 2020 International Booker Prize.

The writer has published literature including novels, chronicles, essays, cultural studies, and television story-writing. Falsa liebre (2013), Aquí no es Miami (2013), Hurricane Season (2017), and Páradais (2021) among many others which have been found in every part of Latin America, Europe, and the United States and have been translated into several languages. Melchor has been awarded several prestigious prizes, including the Anna Seghers Prize, the Berlin International Literature Award, and the Ryszard Kapuściński Award. She has also been a finalist for the International Booker Prize and appeared on The New York Times' lists of the best books of the century.

== Life and career ==
Fernanda Melchor was born in the municipality of Boca del Río, in Veracruz.

Melchor graduated with a degree in Journalism from the Universidad Veracruzana where she was Coordinator of Communication of the Veracruz-Del Río campus.

Melchor has published fiction and nonfiction in The Paris Review, La Palabra y el Hombre, Letras Libres, Excélsior, Replicante, Milenio semanal, Le Monde diplomatique, Vice Latinoamérica, GQ Latinoamérica and Vanity Fair Latinoamerica. She began her writing career in 2013 with the publication of Aquí no es Miami (2013), a collection of literary journalism, and Falsa Liebre (2013), her first novel.

Hurricane Season —a novel based on the murder of a witch in a small town in Melchor's home state, Veracruz—was featured as one of the best novels in Mexico in 2017 The book has been translated into German by Angelica Ammar and into English by Sophie Hughes. It won the 2020 International Literature Award of the Haus der Kulturen in Germany, and was shortlisted for the 2020 International Booker Prize.

In 2015, Melchor was included in a Conaculta's anthology as one of the featured Mexican authors under 40 years old.

In 2018, Melchor won the PEN Mexico Award for Literary and Journalistic Excellence.

In 2019, Melchor was awarded the International Literature Award as well as the Anna Seghers-Preis along with the German writer Joshua Gross.

Melchor's 2021 book, Paradais, translated by Sophie Hughes, was shortlisted for the LA Times Book Prize.

In September 2023 the English translation of Aquí no es Miami (This is Not Miami) was longlisted for the National Book Award for Translated Literature.

In 2024, she received the Ryszard Kapuściński Award, an international literary prize in the genre of literary reportage, for her book Aquí no es Miami (This is Not Miami).

== Works ==
=== Novels ===
- 2013 – Falsa liebre
- 2017 – Temporada de huracanes
- 2021 – Páradais

=== Chronicles, Essays, and Nonfiction ===
- 2013 – Aquí no es Miami
- 2014 – México 20: New Voices, Old Traditions
- 2018 – Nuevas voces de la narrativa mexicana

=== English Translations (by Sophie Hughes) ===
- 2020 – Hurricane Season
- 2022 – Paradais
- 2023 – This Is Not Miami

=== Translations by Fernanda Melchor ===
- 2016 – Circunstancias atenuantes, by David Lida
- 2016 – El informe rojo, by William Ryan
- 2022 – The House on Mango Street, by Sandra Cisneros
- 2018 – The Line Becomes a River, by Francisco Cantú
- 2017 – The Mothers, by Brit Bennett
- 2019 – The Plotters, by Kim Un-su
- 2017 – The Ordinary Seaman, by Francisco Goldman
- 2017 – Mothers, by Affinity Konar
- 2016 – Monsignor Quixote, by Graham Greene

=== Adaptations and Audiovisual Works ===
- 2021 – Somos (television show)
- 2023 – Hurricane Season (film adaptation)

== Awards and honors ==
- Winner of the First Essay Contest on by the CNDH, 2002
- Winner of the Literary Virtuality Casa de Letras, National Autonomous University of Mexico, 2007
- Winner of the Journalism Award of the Journalism Foundation Rubén Pabello Acosta, 2009
- Winner of the Chronicle National Award Dolores Guerrero, 2011
- Winner of the Pen Club Prize for Journalistic and Literary Excellence, 2018
- Winner of the International Literature Award, 2019
- Winner of the Anna Seghers-Preis, 2019 for Hurricane Season
- Shortlisted for the International Booker Prize 2020 for Hurricane Season
- Shortlisted for the Dublin International Literary Awards 2021 for Hurricane Season
- Longlisted for the International Booker Prize 2022 for Paradais
- Winner of the Ryszard Kapuściński Award for "This is not Miami", 2024
