= Jorge Consiglio =

Argentine poet, novelist and writer

Jorge Consiglio (born 1962) is an Argentine poet, novelist and writer. He was born in Buenos Aires and studied at the University of Buenos Aires. He has published four novels, and has won numerous literary prizes in Argentina and Spain. He has also published several volumes of short stories and poetry. The short story collection Villa del Parque has been translated into English under the title Southerly.

== Selected works ==
=== Novels ===
- El bien (The Good, 2003; Award for Emerging Writers, Opera Prima, Spain)
- Gramática de la sombra (Grammar of the Shadows, 2007; Third Municipal Prize for Novels)
- Pequeñas intenciones (Small Intentions, 2011; Second National Prize for Novels, First Municipal Prize for Novels)
- Hospital Posadas (2015)
- 2018 - Tres Monedas (Eterna Cadencia)

=== Stories ===
- 1998 - Marrakech (Simurg)
- 2009 - El otro lado (Edhasa)
- 2016 - Villa del Parque (Eterna Cadencia), publicado en Reino Unido bajo el título Southerly (Charco Press)

=== Poetry ===
- 1986 - Indicio de lo otro (Halmargen Editora)
- 1992 - Las frutas y los días (Último Reino)
- 2004 - La velocidad de la tierra (Alción editora)
- 2006 - Intemperie (Alción Editora)
- 2018 - Plaza Sinclair (Editorial Conejos)

=== Others ===
- 2017 - Las cajas (Editorial Excursiones)
