= Ariana Harwicz =

Argentinian writer (born 1977)

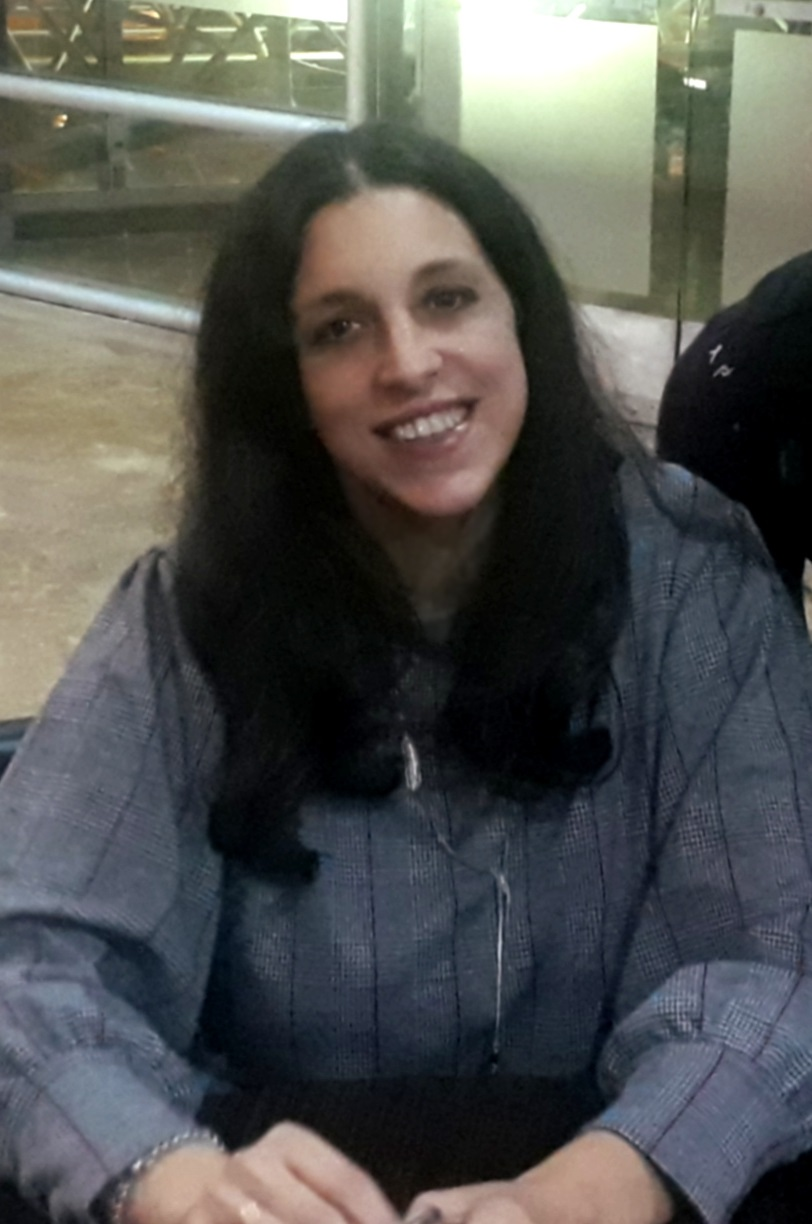
- Ariana Harwicz (2018).
- Born: 1977 (age 48–49); Buenos Aires
- Education: University of Paris VII, Sorbonne
- Occupations: Writer, screenwriter, playwright and documentary maker
- Writing career
- Notable work: Die, My Love
- Notable awards: Longlisted for the 2018 International Booker Prize

Ariana Denise Harwicz (born 13 December 1977 in Buenos Aires) is an Argentine writer, screenwriter, playwright and documentary maker. She earned a degree in performing arts from the University of Paris VII and a Master's in comparative literature from the Sorbonne. Her first novel, Matate, amor (2012), was translated into English as Die, My Love (2017, Charco Press) and was longlisted for the 2018 Man Booker International Prize. La débil mental (2014) was translated as Feebleminded (Charco Press). Her works have been translated into more than ten languages.

== Life and career ==
Ariana Harwicz was born in Buenos Aires on 13 December 1977 into a Jewish family. Her father, Carlos worked in the film industry; her mother, Silvia, was a psychoanalyst. Harwicz herself studied screenwriting and film direction in Argentina, before moving to France to study performing arts at the University of Paris VII and comparative literature at the Sorbonne. In 2007, she moved to the French village of Saint-Satur. Her husband is Edgardo Scott, also an Argentine writer. Harwicz has two sons.

Besides her native Spanish, Harwicz grew up speaking Hebrew at home; she also understands Portuguese and English.

=== Reception ===
Harwicz has been described as "one of the most singular voices of contemporary Argentine literature".

Writing about Die, My Love, critic Sarah Booker notes:

Violence—the imagining of it, the physical infliction of it, and its effect on the psyche—dominates this slim novel from its opening line....The novel immerses the reader into the mind of a woman struggling with post-partum depression, who teeters on the edge of reality, and who lashes out violently. Through the narrative perspective of a new mother and wife living in France, it examines the marginalized position of the mentally unstable and foreign in a rural landscape.

Ellen Jones of The Guardian writes about Feebleminded:

Harwicz excels at tackling taboos around female desire, filial loyalty, a lack of maternal instinct and even incest. Moreover, her prose, thanks in part to the razor-sharp translation, is completely addictive.

==== Film adaptations ====
After reading Die, My Love in 2020, American director Martin Scorsese sent actress Jennifer Lawrence a copy of the novel, telling her he imagined her as the protagonist of the novel. A film based on the novel, Die My Love, was released in 2025 directed by Lynne Ramsay, starring Lawrence and Robert Pattinson and produced by Scorcese. The film premiered at the 2025 Cannes Film Festival.

In 2025, it was announced that Harwicz's novel Unfit (Spanish: Perder el juicio) would receive a film adaptation.

=== Views on Israel and exclusion from literary festival ===
Harwicz denies the existence of a genocide in Gaza perpetrated by Israel and compares antizionist rhetoric to Nazi rhetoric. (Note: "Me impresiona ver en Europa, en Alemania, en Francia, en España, en los países nórdicos, llamar a los artistas a la Intifada, oírlos decir ‘basta del genocidio en Gaza‘, calificar a los israelíes de supremacistas y colonizadores. Encontraron la vuelta retórica para odiar a los judíos y pedir la aniquilación de Israel. Es una renovación lexical de la juventud hitleriana y del nazismo del siglo XX, pero más escandalosa y cómplice, a mi entender, porque tenemos la Shoá detrás”.") In 2025, she wrote on X that those who accuse Israel of a genocide "desire a genocide to confirm their hate of Israel". (Note: "Les angustia terriblemente que no haya genocidio. Lo desean, desean que haya genocidio para confirmar su odio a Israel”, escribió en X en 2025.)

In September 2026, Harwicz was excluded from a literary festival in Granada, Spain, hosted by the University of Granada, in which she was slated to participate, after a group of pro-Palestine activists requested her exclusion due to several articles penned by Harwicz, where she expressed her opposition to a cultural boycott of Israel. Harwicz accused the university of discriminating against her for being Jewish. Over 350 writers and intellectuals signed a letter condemning Harwicz's exclusion from the event; Irish writer John Banville withdrew from the event. The Argentine Embassy in Spain also condemned Harwicz's exclusion from the event and demanded that the University of Granada address the situation. In response, a letter signed by over 500 writers, including Cristina Rivera Garza, publicly criticized Harwicz for her position on the Gaza genocide and supported the decision of the festival organizers to rescind her invitation.

== Bibliography ==
=== Fiction ===
- Matate, amor (2012), translated by Sarah Moses and Carolina Orloff as Die, My Love (2012); adapted into a feature film (2025)
- La débil mental (2014), translated by Annie McDermott and Carolina Orloff as Feebleminded (2019)
- Precoz (2015), translated by Annie McDermott and Carolina Orloff as Tender (2022)
- Degenerado (2019)
- Perder el juicio (2024) translated by Jessie Mendez Sayer as Unfit (2025)

=== Essay ===
- Tan intertextual que te desmayás (2013)
- Desertar (2020)
- El ruido de una época (2023)

=== Anthology ===
- Trilogía de la pasión (2023)
