= Die, My Love =

Novel by Ariana Harwicz

Die, My Love (Spanish: Mátate, amor) is a 2012 novel by Argentine author Ariana Harwicz. The English version was translated by Sarah Moses and Carolina Orloff, and published by Charco Press in 2017. This was the first work by Harwicz published in English.

The book is about a mother who has mental difficulties whilst living in rural France. Lorna Scott Fox in Times Literary Supplement states that the story line shows a "repetitive crisis" while the characters and story have little change.

== Adaptation ==
In 2020, Martin Scorsese sent the novel to Excellent Cadaver (run by Jennifer Lawrence and Justine Ciarrochi) after reading it in his book club, envisioning Die My Love with Lawrence in the lead role. In November 2022, Lawrence confirmed she would star in the film, which Lynne Ramsay was co-writing with playwright Enda Walsh. Ramsay became involved as director after Lawrence sent her the book. In July 2024, Robert Pattinson was in talks to join the film, which was first screened in the main competition of the 2025 Cannes Film Festival on May 17, 2025. It was released in the United States and Canada on November 7, 2025.

== Reception ==
Kirkus Reviews wrote that the work "cuts to the bone."

British author Hari Kunzru stated that this was his favourite book of 2017.
