= Vincenzo Latronico =

Italian writer and translator (born 1984)

- Latronico in 2026
- Born: 1984 (age 41–42); Rome, Italy
- Occupations: Writer; translator
- Notable work: Perfection (Le perfezioni, 2022)

Vincenzo Latronico (born 1984) is an Italian writer and translator.

== Life and works ==
Latronico was born in Rome, Italy, in 1984, and later moved to Milan to study philosophy.

In 2008, he published his debut novel, Ginnastica e Rivoluzione (Bompiani), followed by La cospirazione delle colombe (Bompiani, 2011), La mentalità dell'alveare (Bompiani, 2013), Narciso nelle colonie (Quodlibet, 2013), Le perfezioni (Bompiani, 2022), and La chiave di Berlino (Einaudi, 2023). Translations of his novels have been published in more than 20 countries, and in 2025, he was shortlisted for the International Booker Prize for Le perfezioni (translated into English by Sophie Hughes as Perfection).

As a translator, he has produced Italian versions of works by a range of authors, including Oscar Wilde, F. Scott Fitzgerald, and George Orwell. Latronico has been published in La Stampa and Corriere della Sera, and he is a regular contributor to the weekly Internazionale.

== Personal life ==
Latronico is married to the literary agent Arianna Miazzo.
