= Giuseppe Caputo =

Colombian writer

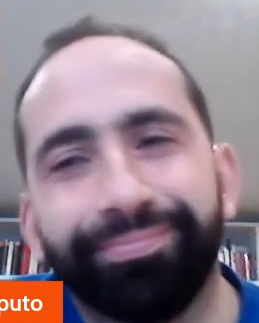
- Born: 1982 (age 43–44); Barranquilla
- Education: New York University
- Alma mater: University of Iowa
- Occupation: Writer
- Writing career
- Notable work: Un mundo huérfano

Giuseppe Caputo (born 1982) is a Colombian writer. He was born in Barranquilla on the Caribbean coast, and studied both in Colombia and in the United States. He has an MFA in creative writing from New York University and the University of Iowa. He has written the novels Un mundo huérfano, Estrella Madre and Se va un hombre, and the poetry collections Jardín de carne and El hombre jaula y Los nacimientos de Jesús. He is a regular contributor to El Tiempo newspaper and has worked for the Bogotá International Book Fair.

In 2017, he was named as one of the Bogota39, a selection of the most promising young writers in Latin America.
