= James Noël (poet) =

Haitian poet, writer and actor (born 1978)

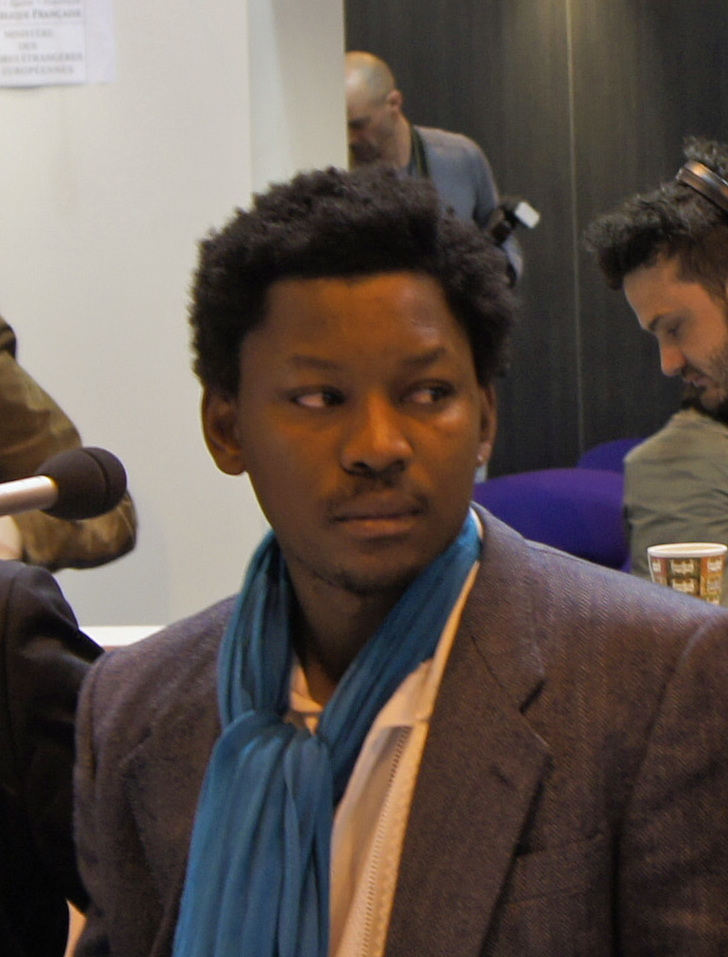
- Born: 1978 (age 46–47); Haiti
- Occupation(s): Poet, writer, and actor

James Noël (born 1978) is a Haitian poet, writer and actor. He writes in both French and Creole.

Noël's poems have been translated into several languages. He is the editor of a 2015 anthology of contemporary Haitian poetry, featuring 73 poets. In 2017, he published his first novel, Belle merveille.

== Bibliography ==
=== Poetry ===
- Poèmes à double tranchant/Seul le baiser pour muselière, 2005
- Le Sang visible du vitrier, 2006
- Bon Nouvel, 2009
- Kabòn 47, 2009
- Rectoverso, 2009
- Quelques poèmes et de poussières, 2009
- Des Poings chauffés à blanc, 2010
- La fleur de Guernica, 2010
- Kana Sutra / Toutes ces villes qui se trompent de trottoirs, 2011
- La Migration des murs, 2012
- Le Pyromane adolescent, 2013
- Empreintes, 2014
- Majigridji, 2017
- Brexit suivi de la migration des murs, 2020

=== Anthology ===
- Cheval de feu, 2015

=== Novel ===
- Belle merveille, 2017
