= Premio Valle-Inclán =

- Native name: Premio Valle-Inclán
- Presented by: Society of Authors (UK)
- Established: 1997
- Website: societyofauthors.org/prizes/translation-prizes/spanish-premio-valle-inclan/

The Premio Valle-Inclán is a literary translation prize. It is awarded by the Society of Authors for the best English translation of a work of Spanish literature. It is named after Ramón del Valle-Inclán. The prize money is GBP £3,000 and a runner-up is awarded £1,000.

The award is granted annually recognizing translations of full-length Spanish language works of literary merit and general interest published in the UK. The selection process often highlights the translator's skill in capturing the essence and complexity of the original Spanish text, whether the work is contemporary fiction, non-fiction, or poetry.

== Past winners ==
=== 2024 ===
- Winner: Chris Andrews, Edith Grossman, and Alastair Reid for their collaborative translation of Maqroll's Prayer and Other Poems by Álvaro Mutis.
- Runners-up: Kit Maude for his translation of the novel Cousins by Aurora Venturin.

Shortlist:

- Christina MacSweeney for her translation of Fury by Clyo Mendoza.
- Chris Andrews for You Glow in the Dark by Liliana Colanzi.
- Clayton Lehmann and Ángela Helmer for their translation of General History of the Indies by Francisco López de Gómara.

=== 2023 ===
- Winner: William Rowe and Helen Dimos for a translation of Trilce. Translations and Glosses by César Vallejo (Veer Books, Crater Press)
- Rosalind Harvey for a translation of Still Born by Guadalupe Nettel (Fitzcarraldo Editions)

Shortlist:

- Jennifer Croft for a translation of Two Sherpas by Sebastián Martínez Daniell (Charco Press)
- Simon Deefholts and Kathryn Phillips-Miles for a translation of Take Six: Six Spanish Women Writers by various authors (Dedalus Limited)
- Forrest Gander for a translation of It Must Be a Misunderstanding by Coral Bracho (Carcanet Press)
- Victor Meadowcroft for a translation of This World Does Not Belong to Us by Natalia García Freire (Oneworld Publications)

=== 2022 ===
- Winner: Annie McDermott for a translation of Wars of the Interior by Joseph Zárate (Granta)
- Runner-up: Julia Sanches for a translation of Slash and Burn by Claudia Hernández González (And Other Stories)

Shortlist:

- Chris Andrews for a translation of The Divorce by César Aira (And Other Stories)
- Annie McDermott for a translation of Brickmakers by Selva Almada (Charco Press)
- Hannah Kauders for a translation of Las Biuty Queens by Iván Monalisa Ojeda (Weidenfeld & Nicolson, Orion)
- Megan McDowell for a translation of The Dangers of Smoking in Bed by Mariana Enríquez (Granta)

=== 2021 ===
- Winner: Fionn Petch for a translation of A Musical Offering by Luis Sagasti (Charco Press)
- Runner-up: Lisa Dillman for a translation of A Luminous Republic by Andrés Barba (Granta)

Shortlist:

- Annie McDermott for a translation of Dead Girls by Selva Almada (Charco Press)
- Sophie Hughes for a translation of Hurricane Season by Fernanda Melchor (Fitzcarraldo Editions)
- Christina MacSweeney for a translation of Ramifications by Daniel Saldaña París (Charco Press)

=== 2020 ===
- Winner: Katherine Silver for a translation of The Word of the Speechless by Julio Ramon Ribeyro (New York Review Books)
- Runner-up: Anne McLean for a translation of Lord of All the Dead by Javier Cercas (MacLehose Press)

Shortlist:

- Richard Gwyn for a translation of Impossible Loves by Darío Jaramillo (Carcanet Poetry)
- Abigail Parry and Serafina Vick for a translation of A Little Body are Many Parts by Legna Rodríguez Iglesias (Bloodaxe Books and the Poetry Translation Centre)
- Margaret Jull Costa and Sophie Hughes for a translation of Mac and His Problem by Enrique Vila-Matas (Vintage, PRH)
- Megan McDowell for a translation of Mouthful of Birds by Samanta Schweblin (Oneworld)

=== 2019 ===
- Winner: Jessica Sequeira for a translation of Land of Smoke by Sara Gallardo (Pushkin Press)
- Runner-up: Sophie Hughes for a translation of The Remainder by Alia Trabucco Zeran (And Other Stories)

Shortlisted:

- Nick Caistor for a translation of Springtime in a Broken Mirror by Mario Benedetti (Penguin Classics)
- Charlotte Coombe for a translation of Fish Soup by Margarita García Robayo (Charco Press)
- William Gregory for a translation of The Oberon Anthology of Contemporary Spanish Plays by Borja Ortiz de Gondra, Blanca Doménech, Victor Sánches Rodríguez, Vanessa Montford, and Julio Escalada (Oberon Books)

=== 2018 ===
- Winner: Megan McDowell for Seeing Red by Lina Meruane (Atlantic)
- Runner-up: Daniel Hahn for In the Land of Giants by Gabi Martínez (Scribe)

Shortlisted:

- Simon Deefholts and Kathryn Phillips-Miles for Inventing Love by José Ovejero (Peter Owen Publishers);
- Sarah Moses and Carolina Orloff for Die, My Love by Ariana Harwicz (Charco Press)

=== 2017 ===
- Winner: Margaret Jull Costa for On the Edge by Rafael Chirbes (Harvill Secker)
- Commendation: Rosalind Harvey for I'll Sell You a Dog by Juan Pablo Villalobos (And Other Stories)

=== 2016 ===
- Winner: Christina MacSweeney for The Story of My Teeth by Valeria Luiselli (Granta)

=== 2015 ===
- Winner: Anne McLean for Outlaws by Javier Cercas (Bloomsbury)
- Commendation: Margaret Jull Costa for her translation of Tristana by Benito Pérez Galdós (New York Review Books)

=== 2014 ===
- Winner: Nick Caistor for An Englishman in Madrid, by Eduardo Mendoza (MacLehose Press)
- Commendation: Margaret Jull Costa for her translation of The Infatuations by Javier Marías (Hamish Hamilton)

=== 2013 ===
- Winner: Frank Wynne for The Blue Hour by Alonso Cueto (Heinemann)
- Runner-up: Nick Caistor and Lorenza García for Traveller of the Century by Andrés Neuman (Pushkin Press)
- Runner-up: Anne McLean for The Sound of Things Falling by Juan Gabriel Vásquez (Bloomsbury)

=== 2012 ===
- Winner: Peter Bush for Exiled from Almost Everywhere by Juan Goytisolo (Dalkey Archive Press)
- Runner-up: Margaret Jull Costa for Seven Houses in France by Bernardo Atxaga (Harvill Secker)

=== 2011 ===
- Winner: Frank Wynne for Kamchatka by Marcelo Figueras (Atlantic)
- Runner-up: Margaret Jull Costa for The Sickness by Alberto Barrera Tyszka (Maclehose Press)

=== 2010 ===
- Margaret Jull Costa for Your Face Tomorrow 3: Poison, Shadow and Farewell by Javier Marías (Chatto)
- Christopher Johnson for the Selected Poetry of Francisco de Quevedo (University of Chicago Press).

=== 2009 ===
- Winner: Margaret Jull Costa for The Accordionist's Son by Bernardo Atxaga (Harvill Secker)
- Runner-up: Edith Grossman for Happy Families by Carlos Fuentes (Bloomsbury)

=== 2008 ===
- Winner: Nick Caistor for The Past by Alan Pauls (Harvill Secker)
- John Dent-Young for Selected Poems by Luis de Góngora (The University of Chicago Press)

=== 2007 ===
- Winner: Nick Caistor for The Sleeping Voice by Dulce Chacón (Harvill Secker/Alfaguara)
- Runner-up: John Cullen for Lies by Enrique de Hériz (Weidenfeld/Edhasa)

=== 2006 ===
- Winner: Margaret Jull Costa for Your Face Tomorrow 1: Fever and Spear by Javier Marías (Chatto & Windus)
- Runner-up: Sonia Soto for The Oxford Murders by Guillermo Martinez (Abacus)

=== 2005 ===
- Winner: Chris Andrews for Distant Star by Roberto Bolaño (Harvill)
- Runner-up: Margaret Jull Costa for The Man of Feeling by Javier Marías (Harvill)

=== 2004 ===
- Winner: Anne McLean for Soldiers of Salamis by Javier Cercas (Bloomsbury)

=== 2003 ===
- Winner: Sam Richard for Not Only Fire by Benjamin Prado (Faber and Faber)

=== 2002 ===
- Winner: John D. Rutherford for Don Quixote by Miguel de Cervantes (Penguin)
- Runner-up: Margaret Sayers Peden for Portrait in Sepia by Isabel Allende (Flamingo)

=== 2001 ===
- Winner: Timothy Adès for Homer in Cuernavaca by Alfonso Reyes (Edinburgh University Press)
- Runner-up: Edith Grossman for The Messenger by Mayra Montero (Harvill)

=== 2000 ===
- Winner: Sonia Soto for Winter in Lisbon by Antonio Muñoz Molina (Granta)
- Runner-up: Margaret Sayers Peden for Daughter of Fortune by Isabel Allende (Flamingo)

=== 1999 ===
- Winner: Don Share for I Have Lots of Heart by Miguel Hernández (Bloodaxe)

=== 1997 ===
- Winner: Peter Bush for The Marx Family Saga by Juan Goytisolo (Faber)
