= Charlotte Coombe =

British literary translator

Charlotte Coombe is a British literary translator working from French, Spanish and Catalan into English. She graduated with a degree in Modern Languages & European Studies from the University of Bath in 2007. She has translated over a dozen works of fiction and non-fiction.

In 2019, she was shortlisted for the Premio Valle-Inclán for her translation of Fish Soup by Margarita García Robayo. She has been awarded two PEN Translates Awards for her translations, as well as the Oran Robert Perry Burke Award for Literary Translation from The Southern Review.

Her co-translation with Isabel Adey of Marvel Moreno's December Breeze was shortlisted for the Queen Sofia Spanish Institute Translation Prize in 2023.

In 2026, she was shortlisted for the J&N David Bellos Translation Prize.

Along with Tina Kover, she co-founded and runs the YouTube channel Translators Aloud, shining a spotlight on literary translators reading from their work.

== List of translated fiction and non-fiction works ==
- Vincent Doumeizel – The Power of Plankton
- Anna Pazos – Killing the Nerve (co-translated with Laura McGloughlin)
- Zoé Derleyn – 'Yellow Dust'
- Frédéric Laffont – At 24 Faubourg Saint-Honoré (co-translated with Tina Kover)
- Rosa Ribas – Far
- Silvia Arazi – 'A Mother's Voice'
- Vincent Doumeizel – The Seaweed Revolution
- Marvel Moreno – December Breeze (co-translated with Isabel Adey)
- Antonio Diaz Oliva – 'Mrs. Gonçalves and the Lives of Others'
- Aitor Romero Ortega – 'Bridges of Bosnia'
- Victor Vegas – 'She Dances Alone'
- Jimena González - 'City' in Modern Poetry in Translation, Issue no. 1 Spring, 2021
- Juan Villoro – 'The Parable of the Bread' in the anthology: And We Came Outside and Saw the Stars Again
- Mario Vargas Llosa – Speech for the opening of the 20th international literature festival berlin
- Eduardo Berti – 'Imagined Lands'
- Ricardo Romero – 'Pandemic Diary'
- Margarita García Robayo – Holiday Heart
- Marvel Moreno – 'Tea in Augsburg' (co-translated with Isabel Adey)
- Marvel Moreno – 'Self-Criticism' (co-translated with Isabel Adey)
- Margarita García Robayo – Fish Soup
- Eduardo Berti – The Imagined Land
- Ricardo Romero – The President's Room
- Abnousse Shalmani – Khomeini, Sade and Me
- Asha Miró and Anna Soler-Pont – Traces of Sandalwood
- Marc De Gouvenain – The Solomon Islands Witness
- Rosamaría Roffiel – 'These Are Things I Only Tell Myself'
- Edgardo Nuñez Caballero – 'Landscapes With Beasts'
- Santiago Roncagliolo – 'The Well'
