= Charco Press =

English independent publisher, specializes in Latin America

Charco Press is an independent publisher based in Edinburgh that specialises in translating contemporary Latin American fiction into English. It was launched in 2016 by Carolina Orloff and Samuel McDowell. Its professed aim is to introduce groundbreaking works of contemporary Latin American literature through carefully crafted translations to an audience that may be unfamiliar with its themes or narrative styles. In 2019, the house began distribution in Canada and the US. In 2021, it launched a collection of original works in Spanish, and in 2022, one of original works in English.

== Name ==
The name Charco, meaning "puddle" or "pond" in Spanish, derives from a colloquial expression used in some Latin American countries to refer to the Atlantic Ocean. More specifically, the expression cruzar el charco ("to cross the pond") refers to the act of going overseas or travelling between continents, and may carry connotations of the migratory waves that moved to and from Latin America in different historical periods. Thus, the publisher's name stands for its aim to act as a cultural and linguistic bridge between Latin America and the English-speaking world.

== History ==
Charco Press was launched in November 2016 in the city of Edinburgh by Carolina Orloff and Samuel McDowell. According to Orloff, who earned her PhD in Latin American literature at the University of Edinburgh, the Latin American authors who until the first decade of the 21st century were available in English-language bookshops and discussed in English-language academia were always the same. Thus, when she and McDowell started to develop their publishing project, they decided to seek out recent Latin American books of great impact and make them accessible to English-speaking readers. In 2019, Charco partnered with Consortium, a brand of Ingram Publisher Services, to commence distribution of its titles in Canada and the US. In 2021, it launched a collection of original works in Spanish, and in 2022, a collection of original works in English focusing on works of non-fiction and memoirs with a tangible link to Latin America.

== Awards ==
Titles published by Charco have won or received nominations for various awards:

- International Booker Prize: Elena Knows by Claudia Piñeiro, shortlisted 2022; The Adventures of China Iron by Gabriela Cabezón Cámara, shortlisted 2020; Die, My Love by Ariana Harwicz, shortlisted 2018.
- Premio Valle-Inclán of the Society of Authors: A Musical Offering by Luis Sagasti, winner 2021; Two Sherpas by Sebastián Martínez Daniell, shortlisted 2023; Brickmakers by Selva Almada, shortlisted 2022; Dead Girls by Selva Almada, shortlisted 2021; Ramifications by Daniel Saldaña París, shortlisted 2021; Fish Soup by Margarita García Robayo, shortlisted 2019; Die, My Love by Ariana Harwicz, shortlisted 2018.
- Cercador Prize: Of Cattle and Men by Ana Paula Maia, winner 2023.
- Other works were shortlisted for the Republic of Consciousness Prize, the Warwick Prize for Women in Translation, and the Carnegie Medal for Excellence in Fiction.

The house itself has also been distinguished at Scotland's National Book Awards, in which Charco Press was named Publisher of the Year 2023 and Carolina Orloff Emerging Publisher of the Year 2018, and at the British Book Awards, in which Charco was named Scotland's Small Press of the Year in 2021 and 2019.

== Published authors ==
Charco's published authors include:

- Katya Adaui
- Selva Almada
- Ave Barrera
- Cristina Bendek
- Gabriela Cabezón Cámara
- Sergio Chejfec
- Giuseppe Caputo
- Renato Cisneros
- Jorge Consiglio
- Jennifer Croft
- Diamela Eltit
- Federico Falco
- Julián Fuks
- Margarita García Robayo
- Margo Glantz
- Daniel Hahn
- Ariana Harwicz
- Andrea Jeftanovic
- Martín Kohan
- Brenda Lozano
- Ana Paula Maia
- Carla Maliandi
- Daniel Mella
- Sylvia Molloy
- Claudia Piñeiro
- Giovanna Rivero
- Ricardo Romero
- Luis Sagasti
- Daniel Saldaña París
- Karla Suárez
- Fernanda Trías
- Ida Vitale
