= Not a River =

2020 novel by Selva Almada

- Author: Selva Almada
- Original title: No es un río
- Translator: Annie McDermott
- Language: Spanish
- Series: "Trilogía de varones"
- Publisher: Random House, Charco Press
- Publication date: 2020
- Publication place: Argentina
- English publication date: 2024
- ISBN: 978-1913867454
- Preceded by: Ladrilleros

Not a River (original title: No es un río) is the third novel by Argentine writer Selva Almada (Villa Elisa, Entre Ríos, 1973). It was first published by Random House in Buenos Aires in 2020 and the English translation, by Annie McDermott, was released in 2024 by Edinburgh's Charco Press. The author describes the novel as the third installment in her Trilogía de varones ("Men's Trilogy") following El viento que arrasa (2012; The Wind That Lays Waste, 2019) and Ladrilleros (2013; Brickmakers, 2021).

== Plot ==
The novel tells the story of two men from the Argentine littoral who decide to take their dead friend's son on a fishing trip to the same location on the River Paraná where his father drowned years earlier. Tensions arise with the inhabitants of the island where they make camp.

== Critical reception ==
Both Clarín and La Nación included No es un río among their best books of 2020, and it was shortlisted for the Mario Vargas Llosa Novel Prize in 2021. The English translation was also shortlisted for the 2024 International Booker Prize and the 2025 Dublin Literary Award.
