= Miguel del Castillo =

Miguel del Castillo may refer to:

- Miguel del Castillo (writer)
- Miguel del Castillo (politician)
- Miguel del Castillo (actor)

== See also ==
- Miguel Castillo, Honduran footballer
- Miguel Castillo Bracho, Venezuelan social communicator killed during the 2017 Venezuelan protests, see Killing of Miguel Castillo
