= I Am Rome =

2022 novel by Santiago Posteguillo

- Spanish language edition Roma soy yo (2022)
- Author: Santiago Posteguillo
- Original title: Roma soy yo
- Translator: Frances Riddle
- Language: Spanish
- Genre: historical fiction
- Publisher: Penguin Random House
- Publication date: 19 July 2022
- Publication place: Spain
- English publication date: 5 May 2024
- Pages: 752
- ISBN: 9788466671781

I Am Rome: A Novel of Julius Caesar (Spanish: Roma soy yo. La verdadera historia de Julio César) is a 2022 historical novel by the Spanish writer Santiago Posteguillo. It is the first in a planned series of six novels about Julius Caesar.

== Plot ==
The novel covers Julius Caesar's early life and career. The 23-year-old Caesar makes a name for himself as a prosecutor in the corruption case against the governor Gnaeus Cornelius Dolabella in 77 BC. The intrigues of the legal case, which involve espionage and murder, are interspersed with flashback scenes from Caesar's childhood, education and arranged marriage to Cornelia.

== Reception ==
The novel had sold more than 300,000 copies in Spain by the time the sequel Maldita Roma was published in 2023.

Publishers Weekly called I Am Rome "an engrossing narrative" with "action, oratory, and spectacle galore", writing that its frequent disregard for historical accuracy makes it comparable to Christian Jacq's novels about Ramses II. Kirkus Reviews wrote that Posteguillo provides insight about the violence and hypocrisy of the Roman Republic's political life, but the novel is dragged down by "a plodding narrative style", overuse of cliffhangers, and overlong, unrealistic and "soap operatic" dialogues.
