= Germán Vargas =

Germán Vargas may refer to:

- Germán Vargas Cantillo (1919–1991), Colombian writer and journalist, member of the Barranquilla Group
- Germán Vargas Espinosa (1934–2015), Colombian businessman and politician, father of Germán Vargas Lleras
- Germán Vargas Lleras (1962–2026), Colombian politician, vice-president from 2014 to 2017
