= Christina MacSweeney =

Translator

Christina MacSweeney is a literary translator who usually translates Latin American fiction into English.

== Career ==
MacSweeney is a literary translator who holds an MA in Literary Translation from the University of East Anglia in Norwich, England. Her portfolio includes fiction and nonfiction works by authors such as Valeria Luiselli, Daniel Saldaña París, Jazmina Barrera, Elvira Navarro, Julián Herbert, Karla Suárez, and Verónica Gerber Bicecci. Her work has received several award recognitions. She won the 2016 Valle Inclán Translation Prize for her translation of Valeria Luiselli’s The Story of My Teeth, which was also shortlisted for the 2017 Dublin Literary Award. More recently, her translation of Elvira Navarro’s Rabbit Island: Stories was longlisted for a National Book Award, while her work on Jazmina Barrera’s Cross-Stitch and Clyo Mendoza’s Fury was shortlisted for the Queen Sofía Spanish Institute Translation Prize and the Valle Inclán Translation Prize, respectively. In addition to full-length volumes, MacSweeney has contributed to various anthologies of Latin American literature and published articles, interviews, and translations across multiple platforms.

- Longlist, 2025 National Book Awards
- Longlist, 2021 National Book Awards

Her translated books include:

- Daniel Saldaña París - Among Strange Victims (Coffee House Press, 2016)
- Eduardo Rabasa - A Zero Sum Game (Deep Vellum, 2016)
- Valeria Luiselli - Sidewalks (Coffee House Press 2014); Faces in the Crowd (Coffee House Press, 2014); and The Story of My Teeth (Coffee House Press, 2015)
- Karla Suárez - Havana Year Zero (Charco Press, 2021)
- Jazmina Barrera - Cross-Stich (Two Lines Press, 2023) ISBN 9781949641530
