= List of Argentine films of 2018 =

Argentine films premiered in 2018.

== January ==
- El club de los malditos
- El último traje
- La obra secreta
- Las grietas de Jara
- Los olvidados
- No dormirás
- Pendular

== February ==
- Recreo

== April ==
- La Flor (at Buenos Aires International Festival of Independent Cinema)

== Other ==
- The Accused
- El Angel
- Terrified
- Marilyn
- My Best Friend
- The Snatch Thief
- A Twelve-Year Night
- You Shall Not Sleep
- Bug
- Pensando en él
- Perdida
- El Potro: Unstoppable
- La quietud
- The Queen of Fear
- The Last Man
- Rojo
