= Gnaeus Cornelius Dolabella =

Roman consul in 81 BC and general

Gnaeus Cornelius Dolabella was a consul of the Roman Republic in 81 BC, with Marcus Tullius Decula, during the dictatorship of Sulla.

== Biography ==
Possibly a military tribune in 89 BC, Dolabella soon was attached to the staff of Sulla as a legate, holding command of one of Sulla's fleets in 83 BC. In 82 BC, Dolabella saw action during Sulla's civil war, participating at the Battle of Sacriporto (Sacriportus) and the Battle of the Colline Gate. As a loyal lieutenant, Sulla made him consul in 81 BC, but the consuls of that year were only nominal, as Sulla had all the power in his hands.

In 80 BC, Dolabella was made proconsul of Macedonia, a position which he held until 78 BC. In 77 BC Dolabella was granted a triumph for victories he had achieved while governor over the Thracians, but shortly afterwards he was accused of extortion in Macedonia during his time as governor by the young Julius Caesar and brought to trial. Prosecuted by Caesar, Dolabella was defended by Gaius Aurelius Cotta and Quintus Hortensius. He was found not guilty and acquitted.

== In fiction ==
Dolabella is a minor character in the Colleen McCullough novel Fortune's Favourites. In the novel, just prior to the Battle of the Colline Gate, he blackmails Sulla into giving him the consulship in return for his support, which he threatened to withdraw due to Sulla's decision to pass him over when Sulla gave the command of one of his wings to Marcus Licinius Crassus.

The 2022 novel I Am Rome (Spanish: Roma soy yo) by the Spanish philologist, linguist and author Santiago Posteguillo, known for a series of novels set in ancient Rome, tells a fictional account based on well established historical facts, of how a young Julius Caesar prosecuted and brought Gnaeus Cornelius Dolabella to trial.

== Sources ==
- "Santiago Posteguillo persigue la sombra de Julio César en casa de Alejandro Magno". El País. April 3, 2022.
- T. Robert S. Broughton, The Magistrates of the Roman Republic, Vol II (1952).
- Smith, William, A Dictionary of Greek and Roman Biography and Mythology, Vol. I (1880).

Political offices
Preceded by Gaius Marius the Younger; Gnaeus Papirius Carbo	Roman consul 81 BC with Marcus Tullius Decula	Succeeded by Lucius Cornelius Sulla; Quintus Caecilius Metellus Pius
