= Marvel Moreno =

Colombian writer

Marvel Luz Moreno
- Born: September 23, 1939; Barranquilla, Colombia
- Died: June 5, 1995 (aged 55); Paris, France
- Occupation: Writer
- Parents: Benjamín Jacobo Moreno (father); Berta Abello (mother)
- Awards: Grinzane Cavour Prize for "best foreign book" in Italy (1989)

Marvel Luz Moreno Abello (Barranquilla, Colombia, September 23, 1939 - Paris, June 5, 1995) was a Colombian writer. She was chosen by Cromos magazine as "one of the hundred most influential women in the history of Colombia."

== Biography ==
Marvel was the daughter of Benjamín Jacobo Moreno and Berta Abello, and sister of Ronal Moreno Abello, one of the promoters of science fiction in Colombia. She was part of a traditional wealthy family from Barranquilla, a port city in the northern region of the country. In October 1939 she was baptized a Catholic. In 1950, Moreno was expelled from a convent school for voicing a defense for Charles Darwin and his theories of evolution contradicting the doctrines of the Catholic Church. At the age of 20, her mother encouraged her to join a beauty pageant and she was subsequently named the queen of the Barranquilla Carnival, an important folk festival in the country and one of the biggest carnivals in the world. For a few weeks, she became "the most important character in the city and for some days she enjoys notoriety in the entire country."

In the early sixties she met Alejandro Obregón, an important painter in Colombia, with whom she developed a deep friendship that lasted until her early death. Through him, she got to know other members of the Barranquilla Group, including Álvaro Cepeda Samudio, Gabriel García Márquez as well as Germán Vargas Cantillo who would become a decisive figure in her life by eagerly encouraging her writings.

In 1962, Moreno married her first husband, the writer and journalist Plinio Apuleyo Mendoza, and they had two daughters.

=== Paris life ===
She went twice to Paris, first in 1969, where she began to write and publish her first stories in magazines. At some point she moved to Spain and in September 1971 returned to Paris where she was to remain.

Until 1972, Moreno contributed to Libre, a literary magazine in Spanish that brought together resident Latin American writers or those exiled in Paris.

The author's publications included the stories Something so Ugly in the Life of a Fine Lady (1980) and The Encounter and Other Stories (1980). Critics have said, "In her work the influence of writers such as Virginia Woolf, James Joyce, Carson McCullers and William Faulkner is noted, but in all her work the background is Latin American culture."

In 1982, she married the French engineer Jacques Fourrier.

=== Writings ===
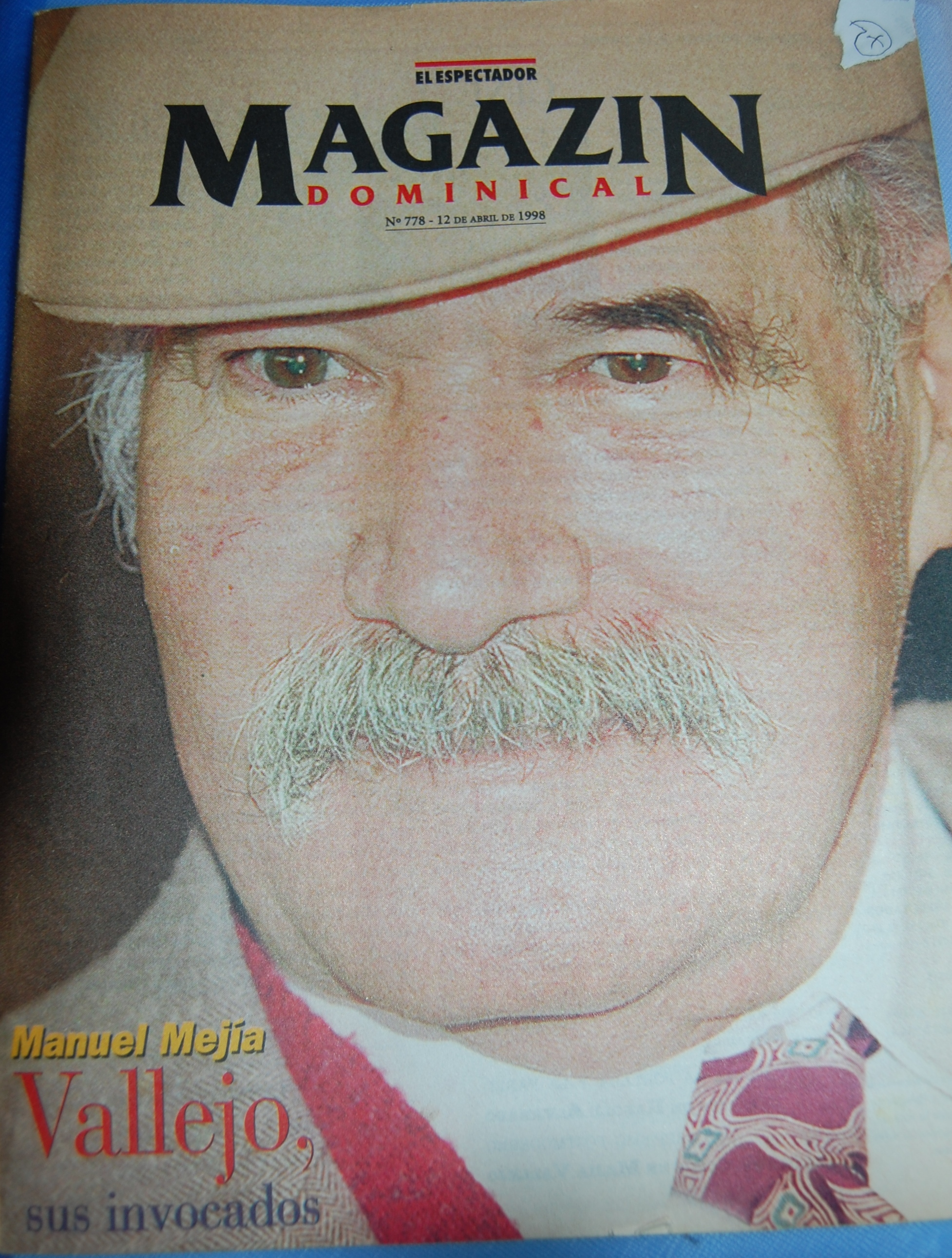
A more recent copy of Colombia's popular Sunday Magazine of El Espectador, in which Moreno published her first story, El Muñeco, in 1969.

In 1969, Moreno published her first short story, El Muñeco, in the magazine Eco and later in the Sunday Magazine of El Espectador. In 1975 she published her second story, Oriane, Aunt Oriane, also in the magazine Eco. In 1980 she published the story La noche feliz de Madame Yvonne, which she wrote in 1977, the same year in which she began to write In December the Breezes Arrived, a novel that completely absorbed her for seven years. It was published in 1987 by Plaza & Janes.

From 1983-1985, the filmmaker Fina Torres created her first movie, Oriana, based on Moreno's second story, and the film went on to win the Caméra d'Or Award at the Cannes Film Festival in France as the "best first feature film." The movie also won Best Film and Best Screenplay at the Cartagena Film Festival, and it was selected as the Venezuelan entry for the Best Foreign Language Film at the 58th Academy Awards, but was not named a nominee. The story was described by American critic Vincent Camby in The New York Times as a "gothic romance" featuring a woman and her French husband who return to South America to sell the home of an aging aunt named Oriane. The story also includes flashbacks to the woman's youth in a Venezuelan beach town and suggests troubles that had been long-forgotten there.

One of Moreno's novels that was translated into Italian, In December the Breezes Arrived, received the Grinzane Cavour Literary Prize for the "best foreign book" in 1989. In this, her first novel, Moreno revealed her style, inherited from "magical realism" matured into "a new dimension of the marvelous reality" as the critics described it. Separately, she managed to publish in Bogotá an anthology of short stories that she had started in 1986, entitled The Encounter and Other Stories, under the Áncora Editores publishing label.

The rights to Moreno's last novel, The Time of the Amazons, had been reserved by her two daughters and her first husband, from the time Moreno finished it in 1994, a year before she died. The first edition was finally published in March 2020. According to El Tiempo, the consensus in international literary circles was that Moreno's novel, with a main character said to resemble her ex-husband, was kept "on file for 26 years" by Moreno's daughters and Mendoza and was submitted for publication only "after years of political and academic pressure." The family disagrees with that assessment.

=== Death ===
Moreno died in poverty on June 5, 1995, in Paris while suffering from lupus, an illness that was accompanied by depression and that may have led to her early death at age 56, of pulmonary emphysema. Fulfilling her wishes, her body was cremated at the famed Père Lachaise cemetery in Paris, and her ashes thrown into the Seine River.

Hours before she passed, she managed to write the first lines of a story titled Un amor de mi madre.

In 1997, as a posthumous tribute to the writer, Jacques Gilard organized an international colloquium at the University of Toulouse. Moreno's stories, including the first lines of the final text, were compiled in the volume Cuentos Completos, published by Editorial Norma in 2001, within the collection La Otra Orilla.

== Publications ==
=== Stories ===
- El Muñeco, 1969
- Oriane, Aunt Oriane, 1975 (6 editions published between 1986 and 2004 in Spanish and French)
- Something so Ugly in the Life of a Fine Lady, 1980
- The Encounter and Other Stories, 1992
- Complete Stories, 2005

=== Novels ===
- En diciembre llegaban las brisas, 1987, reissued in 2005 and 2014 (29 editions published between 1987 and 2014 in 4 languages)
- El Tiempo de Las Amazonas, 1994, published in March 2020
- Her novel December Breeze was published in English for the first time in 2022, translated by Isabel Adey and Charlotte Coombe.
