= Algo con una mujer =

2020 Argentine crime film

- Film poster
- Directed by: Mariano Turek; Luján Loioco
- Written by: Mariano Turek; Luján Loioco
- Based on: La Rosa by Julio César Beltzer
- Starring: María Soldi; Mabel Vignau; Abel Ayala; Miriam Odorico
- Cinematography: Gustavo Biazzi
- Music by: Gabriel Chwojnik
- Production company: Libre cine
- Release date: June 18, 2020
- Running time: 89 minutes
- Country: Argentina
- Language: Spanish

Algo con una mujer (lit. 'Something with a woman') is a 2020 Argentine crime thriller film written and directed jointly by Mariano Turek and Luján Loioco, as a loose adaptation of the theatrical play La Rosa, by Julio César Beltzer.

It was premiered on Cine.ar TV, and its VOD platform Cine.ar Play in June 2020, as Argentine Movie theaters were closed during the COVID-19 pandemic.

== Plot ==
In 1955, during a turbulent political situation in Argentina previous to the fall of Peronism, Rosa, a crime-stories fan housewife, witnesses the confusing murder of her neighbor. As she feels increasingly distant from her distant husband, a politic activist of the Justicialista party, Rosa will now live her very own crime story.

== Cast ==
- María Soldi as Rosa
- Abel Ayala as Vargas
- Mabel Vignau as Paulina
- Miriam Odorico as Mecha
- Oscar Lápiz as Salcedo
