= Ricardo Romero =

Ricardo Romero may refer to:

- Ricardo Romero (fencer) (1899–?), Chilean Olympic fencer
- Ricardo Romero (fighter) (born 1978), American mixed martial arts fighter
- Ricky Romero (Ricardo Romero, Jr., born 1984), American baseball player
- Ricardo Romero (writer) (born 1976), Argentine writer
