= Two Lines Press =

Independent publishing house

- Parent company: Center for the Art of Translation
- Status: Active
- Founded: 2013
- Country of origin: United States
- Headquarters location: San Francisco, California
- Distribution: Publishers Group West
- Key people: Michael Holtmann (President); CJ Evans (Publisher & Editor-in-Chief); Sarah Coolidge, Editor
- Publication types: Books in translation
- Nonfiction topics: International literature
- Fiction genres: Literary fiction, poetry, non-fiction
- Imprints: Calico series
- No. of employees: 7
- Official website: catranslation.org/books

Two Lines Press is an American independent publishing house based in San Francisco, California, that exclusively publishes literature in translation. Founded in 2013, the press operates as the publishing arm of the Center for the Art of Translation, a nonprofit organization dedicated to promoting international literature and the art of translation.

== History ==
Two Lines Press was established in 2013 as the book publishing imprint of the Center for the Art of Translation, which had been operating since 2000. The press grew out of the Two Lines literary journal, which had been publishing international literature in translation since its founding in 1993 by translator Olivia Sears. According to Publishers Weekly, when Two Lines Press was founded, "the U.S. market for translated literature was fairly narrow," with occasional breakout hits like Roberto Bolaño, Karl Ove Knausgård, and Elena Ferrante, while "everything else was largely ignored." The press was created to address this gap in the American literary market. Publishing Program Two Lines Press publishes approximately eight titles annually. The press's catalog includes titles translated from Arabic, Czech, Finnish, Korean, Macedonian, Portuguese, Swahili, and Thai. The press is distributed by Publishers Group West and has published 52 titles as of 2023. Two Lines Press operates as part of a nonprofit organization, derives its operating budget from donations, grants, and book sales.In 2020, Two Lines Press launched its Calico Series , which publishes collections of translated writing unified by single themes. Previous editions have focused on speculative Chinese-language fiction and queer Brazilian literature. The series publishes two new books per year and has been described by series editor Sarah Coolidge as "a snapshot of writing in translation that speaks to our current moment."

== Notable publications ==
Two Lines Press has published several titles that have received significant literary recognition:

Jazmina Barrera's The Queen of Swords translated from the Spanish by Christina MacSweeney and Mohamed Kheir's Sleep Phase translated from the Arabic by Robin Moger are longlisted for the 2025 National Book Award. Woodworm by Layla Martínez, translated from Spanish by Sophie Hughes and Annie McDermott, was longlisted for the 2024 National Book Award.

On a Woman's Madness by Astrid Roemer, translated from Dutch by Lucy Scott, was a finalist for the 2023 National Book Award and the 2025 Inside Prize.

Slipping by Mohamed Kheir, translated from Arabic by Robin Moger, won the Banipal Prize for Arabic Literary Translation

== Bestselling titles ==
The press's bestselling titles include:

On Lighthouses by Jazmina Barrera, translated from Spanish by Christina MacSweeney

Empty Wardrobes by Maria Judite de Carvalho, translated from Portuguese by Margaret Jull Costam

Mina by Kim Sagwa, translated from Korean by Bruce and Ju-Chan Fulton

The Sleep of the Righteous by Wolfgang Hilbig, translated from German by Isabel Fargo Cole

Self-Portrait in Green by Marie NDiaye, translated from French by Jordan Stump.

== Critical reception ==
Two Lines Press has received significant attention from major literary publications and critics. The San Francisco Chronicle noted that the press has "carved out a niche for itself, publishing challenging, uncompromising writers" and described its books as exemplifying "how translated literature expands the American literary world." The American Booksellers Association profiled Two Lines Press in 2019, highlighting the press's commitment to publishing groundbreaking works, including "the first-ever novel by a Thai woman translated into English."

== Awards and recognition ==
Two Lines Press co-administers the Stevns Translation Prize with Peirene Press (UK), an annual award for literary translation established in 2018. The press has been recognized by Poets & Writers as a vetted publisher for literary works. Multiple Two Lines Press publications have been nominated for the Best Translated Book Award, including Beyond Babylon by Igiaba Scego.

== Industry impact ==
Publishers Weekly reported that Two Lines Press has played a role in the growth of translated literature in the American market, noting that "one of the most heartening things about translation now is there are so many translated books that do well." The press has been recognized for its efforts to introduce new international authors to English-speaking readers and for its commitment to supporting literary translators. Translator Christina MacSweeney, who has translated five books for Two Lines Press stated, “It’s always a positive sign when an editor knows your work well enough to match you with an author" and "from the very first, I was deeply impressed by the support I received throughout the process of getting the novel into print.” Author Jazmina Barrera has described the press as making "a rare and fundamental contribution to bibliodiversity."
