= Faces in the Crowd (novel) =

2011 novel by Valeria Luiselli

- First edition in Spanish (publ. Sexto Piso)
- Author: Valeria Luiselli
- Original title: Los ingrávidos
- Translator: Christina MacSweeney
- Language: Spanish
- Publisher: Sexto Piso
- Publication date: 2011
- Publication place: Mexico
- English publication date: 2014
- Media type: Print (paperback)
- Pages: 152
- ISBN: 978-6077781424

Faces in the Crowd is a 2011 novel by Mexican author Valeria Luiselli, originally under the title Los ingrávidos (literally, "The Weightless"). Christina MacSweeney's English translation was published by Coffee House Press in 2014.

== Plot summary ==
The novel chronicles three intersecting narrative realities. The first narrative is set in Mexico City and follows a young mother and writer as her marriage may or may not be beginning to fall apart.

The second narrative is set in New York, and follows the adventures of the same woman when she was a young translator living a Bohemian life who becomes obsessed with the obscure, early 20th-century Mexican poet Gilberto Owen.

The third narrative follows Owen, the Mexican poet, in Harlem in the 1920s during the Harlem Renaissance, and then many years later, in Philadelphia at the end of his life.

== Reception ==
The book has received acclaim for its unique reorientation of the invented spaces of language and identity. It received the Los Angeles Times Art Seidenbaum Award for First Fiction.
