= Dark Buildings (A Crack in the Wall) =

- Spanish: Las grietas de Jara
- Based on: Las grietas de Jara by Claudia Piñeiro
- Starring: Oscar Martínez; Joaquín Furriel; Soledad Villamil; Sara Sálamo; Laura Novoa; Santiago Segura
- Cinematography: Sol Lopatín
- Edited by: Alberto Ponce
- Music by: Nicolás Sorín
- Production companies: MyS Producción; Gaman Cine; Telefe; Cindy Teperman; Benteveo Producciones Audiovisuales; DK Group; Royal Cinema Group; Non Stop Digital; Bowfinger International Pictures
- Distributed by: Buena Vista International (ar); 39 Escalones (es)
- Release dates: 18 January 2018 (Argentina); 13 July 2018 (Spain)
- Countries: Argentina; Spain
- Language: Spanish

Dark Buildings (A Crack in the Wall) (Spanish: Las grietas de Jara) is a 2018 Argentine-Spanish thriller film directed by Nicolás Gil Lavedra based on the novel of Claudia Piñeiro. Its stars Oscar Martínez, Joaquín Furriel, and Soledad Villamil along with Sara Sálamo, Laura Novoa, and Santiago Segura.

== Plot ==
The plot follows architect Pablo Simó, working alongside Marta Horvath for Mario Borla in an architecture studio. Private individual Nelson Jara files a complaint and asks for a compensation because of a crack on a building, paving the way for an escalating and protracted conflict.

== Cast ==
- Oscar Martínez as Nelson Jara
- Joaquín Furriel as Pablo Simó
- Soledad Villamil as Marta Horvath
- Sara Sálamo as Leonor
- Laura Novoa as Laura
- Santiago Segura as Mario Borla
- Zoe Hochbaum as Francisca

Claudia Piñeiro makes a cameo.

== Production ==
The film was produced by MyS Producción, Cindy Teperman, Telefé, DK Group, Benteveo Producciones Audiovisuales, Royal Cinema, Non Stop, and Gaman Cine alongside Bowfinger International Pictures. Shooting locations included Buenos Aires.

== Release ==
Distributed by Buena Vista International, the film opened in Argentine theatres on 18 January 2018. Distributed by 39 Escalones, it was released theatrically in Spain on 13 July 2018.

== Reception ==
Diego Batlle of La Nación gave the film a 'good' rating, writing that when it explores "certain intimate zones, it gains in subtleties and nuances, reaching an emotional dimension" otherwise lacking in other parts.

Horacio Bernades of Página|12 rated the film with 7 points, writing that it "is sustained by the careful—though perhaps somewhat lax—plot and the performances, all of them precise.

Sergio F. Pinilla of Cinemanía rated the film 3 out of 5 stars, deeming it to be a film "with shoring defects".

== See also ==
- List of Argentine films of 2018
- List of Spanish films of 2018
