= Miguel del Castillo (writer) =

Brazilian writer

Miguel del Castillo (born 1987) is a Brazilian writer.

== Biography ==
Miguel del Castillo was born in Rio de Janeiro in 1987 to an Uruguayan father and a Brazilian mother. He studied architecture at PUC-Rio, where he was also editor of the journal Noz. In 2010 he moved to São Paulo, where he worked for the Cosac Naify publishing house.

He is the author of the short story book Restinga (2015) and the novel Cancún (2019, finalist for the São Paulo Literature Prize), both published by Companhia das Letras. The film rights for Cancún were sold to director Carolina Jabor.

As a translator, he translated several books from Spanish into Portuguese, by authors such as Juan Carlos Onetti, Alejandro Zambra and Julián Herbert.

He was chosen as one of the best young Brazilian writers by Granta magazine in 2011/12, and his short story Violeta was included in the resulting anthology. In 2018 he was writer-in-residence at Fondation Jan Michalski in Switzerland. He has acted as curator of the Photography Library of Moreira Salles Institute.

A postgraduate student in at the Department of Literary Theory and Comparative Literature at USP, he has researched the life and work of Uruguayan writer Felisberto Hernández.
