= Marcus Tullius Decula =

Roman consul in 81 BCE

Marcus Tullius Decula was a consul of the Roman Republic in 81 BC alongside Gnaeus Cornelius Dolabella, during the dictatorship of Sulla; but the consuls of that year were only nominal, as Sulla had all the power in his hands. (Cic. de Leg. Ayr. ii. 14; Gellius, xv. 28; Appian, B. C. i. 100.)

His father was perhaps Marcus Tullius, triumvir monetalis in 120 BC.

== Bibliography ==
- Michael Crawford, Roman Republican Coinage, Cambridge University Press, 1974.

Political offices
Preceded by Gnaeus Papirius Carbo and Gaius Marius the Younger	Consul of the Roman Republic with Gnaeus Cornelius Dolabella; 81 BC	Succeeded by Lucius Cornelius Sulla and Quintus Caecilius Metellus Pius

This article incorporates text from a publication now in the public domain: Smith, William, ed. (1870). "Decula, M. Tullius". Dictionary of Greek and Roman Biography and Mythology. Vol. 1. p. 949.
