= Miranda France =

British writer and translator

Miranda France (born 1966) is a British author, translator, and editor. She has published three nonfiction works and two novels, and is currently a guest tutor at Goldsmiths University.

== Biography ==
France grew up on a farm in East Anglia and attended the University of Edinburgh, where she studied Spanish and Latin American studies. In 1996, she won the Shiva Naipaul Memorial Prize for her writing at The Spectator. Her first nonfiction book, Bad Times in Buenos Aires, was published in 1998 in was shortlisted for the Thomas Cook Travel Book Award. Her translation of Claudia Piñeiro's Thursday Night Windows made the shortlist for the Independent Foreign Ficition Prize.

She edits for the Times Literary Supplement and has had work published by The Guardian, The Telegraph, The Spectator, New Statesman, Literary Review, The Daily Telegraph, and Prospect. She has translated work by Liliana Heker, Claudia Piñeiro, and Alberto Manguel. France teaches for the Arvon Foundation and has taught at Imperial College London and St. George's, University of London.

== Works ==
=== Nonfiction ===
- Bad Times in Buenos Aires (1998)
- Don Quixote's Delusions: Travels in Castilian Spain (2001)
- The Writing School (2023)

=== Fiction ===
- The Summer at Hill Farm (2011)
- The Day Before the Fire (2015)

=== Translations ===
- Thursday Night Windows by Claudia Piñeiro (2010)
- Please Talk to Me by Liliana Heker (2015)
- The Fragility of Bodies by Sergio Olguín (2019)
