= Eduardo Rabasa =

Mexican writer, translator and editor (born 1978)

Eduardo Rabasa (born 1978) is a Mexican writer, translator and editor. He studied political science at UNAM. He is the founding director of Sexto Piso, an independent publisher based in Mexico City. As a translator, he has translated works by English-language writers such as George Orwell and Somerset Maugham.

Rabasa's first novel A Zero Sum Game was widely acclaimed and was translated into English by Christina MacSweeney for publication by Deep Vellum. He has been named in various lists of major young writers such as Mexico20 and Bogota39. He lives in Mexico City.
