= Santiago Posteguillo =

Spanish writer, born 1967

Santiago Posteguillo Gómez
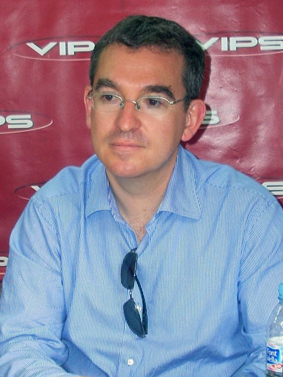
- Born: 1967 (age 58–59); Valencia
- Education: University of Valencia
- Occupations: University professor; novelist
- Writing career
- Language: Spanish
- Period: current
- Genre: Historical novel
- Subject: Ancient Rome
- Notable work: Scipio Africanus trilogy
- Notable awards: Best Historical Novelist award, Hislibris 2009; Valencian Literature Award, 2010
- Website: www.santiagoposteguillo.es

Santiago Posteguillo Gómez is a Spanish philologist, linguist and author, born in Valencia in 1967. He has become known for a number of novels set in Ancient Rome, especially his Scipio Africanus and Trajan trilogies.

== Biography ==
=== Academic career ===
Santiago Posteguillo achieved his doctorate at the University of Valencia. He went on to study creative literature in the United States at Denison University, in Granville, and linguistics and translation at several universities in Great Britain.

He is currently senior lecturer in English Language and Linguistics at the Universitat Jaume I, Castellón, Spain, specialising in 19th-century fiction. He pays attention to the Elizabethan theater and the relationship between English and American literature with film, music and other arts. He is also president of the European Association of Languages for Specific Purposes (AELFE), and a member of the Editorial Board of the international journals English for Specific Purposes and Written Communication. He is author of over seventy academic publications, including Netlinguistics: Language, Discourse and Ideology in Internet (2003) and the Spanish Computing Dictionary: English-Spanish, Spanish-English (2004). He lives in Puçol in the comarca of Huerta Norte, in the Valencian Community, Spain.

=== Writing ===
Posteguillo started by writing crime novels, and during his time as a student at Valencia he used to write poetry. His first novel, Africanus: Son of the Consul, was published in 2006 and formed the first part of his trilogy on Scipio Africanus, the Roman general who defeated Hannibal in the Battle of Zama. The second part, The Accursed Legions, was published in 2008, and by 2013 had reached its ninth edition. The final part, The Betrayal of Rome, came out in 2009. The same year he revised the three novels, now bestsellers.

In 2011 he published The Emperor's Assassins, the first part of a new trilogy about the ascent to the throne of Trajan, the first Roman emperor of Spanish origin. The trilogy continued in Circus Maximus, published on August 29, 2013, and the final novel of the trilogy, The Lost Legion, was published in the spring of 2016.

In 2022 he published I Am Rome, the first in a planned series of six novels about Julius Caesar.

He has also contributed to the newspaper Las Provincias.

== Awards ==
- Finalist, City of Zaragoza Historical Novel Award, 2009 for The Accursed Legions.
- Best Historical Novelist award, Hislibris 2009 for The Betrayal of Rome.
- Valencian Literature Award, 2010.
- Valencian Lyrics Award 2010, in regard of his four historical novels up to that time.
- Received an award at the Cartagena Historical Novels Week (Semana de Novela Histórica de Cartagena), 2010.
- Literature Prize of the cultural programme Continuará, La 2 channel of Televisión Española in Catalonia, 2012.
- Nominated for Valencian Literary Critics Awards (Premios de la Crítica Valenciana) in the category of "essays and other genres" in 2013 for his work, The night when Frankenstein read Don Quijote, and in 2014 for La sangre de los libros. In the category of "narrative" his novel Circus Maximus was nominated in 2013.
- Winner of the Barcelona Historical Novel Prize (Premio Internacional de Novela Histórica Barcino), 2014.
- Recognised as among the "Valencians of the 21st Century" by the newspaper Las Provincias.

== Works ==
=== Scipio Africanus trilogy ===
Based on real people and events, Posteguillo reconstructs republican Rome during the period of the Second Punic War. This series has been translated into Italian and Polish but has not yet been translated into English (as of 2026).

- Africanus: Son of the Consul (Africanus: el hijo del cónsul), Ediciones B, 2006.

The first novel begins with the birth of Publius Cornelius Scipio in 235 B.C.E and recounts his childhood with his younger brother Lucius, their father Publius and their uncle Gnaeus. It also outlines Hamilcar Barca's colonisation of Hispania from 228 B.C.E. and follows his son Hannibal's invasion of Italy. The majority of the novel concerns Scipio's military career, accompanied by Gaius Laelius, including the Battle of Ticinus and the Battle of Cannae. Within Rome, the Scipio family is allied with Aemilius Paullus, while their main adversaries are Fabius Maximus and his protégé Cato. Much adversity befalls a minor character, Titus Maccius, before he overcomes abject poverty to become the playwright Plautus. This volume ends with Scipio's conquest of the Carthaginian capital of Hispania, New Carthage, in 209 B.C.E.

- The Accursed Legions (Las legiones malditas), Ediciones B, 2008.

Scipio, known by the name of Africanus, who received many of the military qualities of his father and uncle, had also created some important enemies: Hasdrubal, brother of Hannibal; and the Punic general Giscón. Enemies also survive in Rome, where Senator Maximus Q. Fabius forced Scipio to accept the task of leading the legions V and VI which stayed neglected for a long time in Sicily.

- The Betrayal of Rome (La traición de Roma), Ediciones B, 2009.

The author resolves the questions that have been opened in the previous two novels.

=== Trajan trilogy ===
- The Emperor's Assassins (Los asesinos del emperador), Planeta, 2011.

This story begins on September 18 of the year AD 96 and covers the following 35 years of Roman history, including a civil war, the Colosseum, the Praetorian Guard and border wars, and the rise of an imperial dynasty under Trajan.

- Circus Maximus - Trajan's rage (Circo Máximo - La ira de Trajano), Planeta, 2013.

In this second novel the emperor Trajan returns. This time, his life is in danger as an assassination plot is being prepared. The book covers the conquest of Dacia (present-day Romania) and the construction of the longest bridge in the ancient world.

- The Lost Legion (La Legión Perdida), Planeta, 2016.

This covers Trajan's ambitions for conquest, under the shadow of the disastrous Parthian campaign led by Crassus 150 years earlier.

=== Julia series ===
- Me, Julia (Yo, Julia), Planeta, 2018.
- And Julia Challenged The Gods (Y Julia Retó a los Dioses), Planeta, 2020.

=== Julius Caesar Series ===
A planned series of six novels about Julius Caesar. Only the first has been translated into English (as of 2026).

- I Am Rome: A novel of Julius Caesar, trans. Frances Riddle, Ballantine Books, 2025 ISBN 9780593598061 . Originally published as Roma soy yo. La verdadera historia de Julio César, Ediciones B, 2022.
- Maldita Roma: La conquista del poder de Julio César (Accursed Rome: Julius Caesar's rise to power), Ediciones B, 2024 ISBN 9788466676564.
- Los Tres Mundos: La conquista de las Galias por Julio César (The Three Worlds: Julius Caesar's conquest of Gaul), Ediciones B, 2026 ISBN 9788466682701.

=== Other ===
- The night Frankenstein read Don Quixote (La noche en que Frankenstein leyó El Quijote), Planeta, 2012.

A collection of short stories in which the author takes a look at some events of literature, revealing some of its secrets: the real writers of the works of Shakespeare or the real discoverer of the potential of Harry Potter.
