= Bug (2018 film) =

2018 Argentine animated short film

- Directed by: Joaquín Ortiz
- Screenplay by: Joaquín Ortiz
- Produced by: Héctor Pérez Hinding; Victoria Paredes
- Edited by: Joaquín Ortiz
- Music by: Ariel Echarren
- Production company: Zitroons
- Distributed by: Cine.ar
- Release dates: June 29, 2018 (Anima Latina); September 11, 2020 (Argentina)
- Running time: 8 minutes
- Country: Argentina

Bug is a 2018 Argentine animated short film written and directed by Joaquín Ortiz. It premiered at Anima Latina on June 29, 2018 in Buenos Aires, Argentina.

== Premise ==
In a three-dimensional futuristic city, two-dimensional beings are controlled by surveillance systems. One of them, Bug, will overcome all obstacles in order to make a transcendent discovery.

== Release ==
Bug had its world premiere at Anima Latina: Latin American Animation Film Festival in Buenos Aires, Argentina, on June 29, 2018.

It was also screened at the Córdoba International Animation Festival – ANIMA on October 10, 2019, the Mar del Plata International Film Festival on November 13, 2019, and the Manchester Film Festival on March 15, 2020. It was subsequently broadcast on Cine.ar TV in Argentina beginning on September 11, 2020.

== Awards and nominations ==
Award	Year	Category	Recipient(s)	Result	Ref.
Anima Latina: Latin American Animation Film Festival	2018	Best Latin American Student Short Film	Bug	Nominated	
BitBang International Animation Festival	2018	CINE.AR Award	Bug	Won	
Cortoons Festival Gandia	2019	International Competition Award	Bug	Nominated	
Manchester Film Festival	2020	Best Animation	Bug	Nominated	
Puerto Madryn International Film Festival	2020	International Short Film Competition Award	Bug	Nominated	
Cartoon Club	2020	Signor Rossi Award	Bug	Nominated	
