= Lost Children Archive =

2019 novel by Valeria Luiselli

- First edition cover
- Author: Valeria Luiselli
- Audio read by: Valeria Luiselli; Kivlighan de Montebello; William DeMeritt; Maia Enrigue Luiselli
- Cover artist: Valeria Luiselli (photos; courtesy of); Jenny Carrow (design)
- Language: English
- Set in: New York, Virginia, North Carolina, Tennessee, Arkansas, Oklahoma, Texas, New Mexico and Arizona
- Publisher: Alfred A. Knopf
- Publication date: February 12, 2019
- Publication place: United States
- Media type: Print (hardcover and paperback) and e-book
- Pages: 400 pp
- ISBN: 978-0-525-52061-0
- Dewey Decimal: 863/.7
- LC Class: PQ7298.422.U37 L67 2019

Lost Children Archive is a 2019 novel by writer Valeria Luiselli. Luiselli was in part inspired by the ongoing American policy of separating children from their parents at the Mexico–United States border. The novel is the first book Luiselli wrote in English.

The novel details a cross-country journey from New York to Arizona in a car by a husband and wife, Mama and Papa, and their children, "the girl" and "the boy," both from previous relationships. The novel incorporates fragments from the poetry of other poets, including from poems by Anne Carson, Galway Kinnell, and Augusto Monterroso. The novel's climax, "Echo Canyon", consists of a single sentence that runs for 20 pages. The novel ends with 24 Polaroid photos provided by Luiselli, credited to the novel's fictional stepson.

The novel won the 2020 Rathbones Folio Prize and the 2021 Dublin Literary Award. It was also longlisted for the 2019 Booker Prize and the 2019 Women's Prize for Fiction.

== Summary ==
An unnamed documentarian lives in New York City with her husband and their two children, his son and her daughter both from previous relationships.

The couple meet while recording a project on languages though she is a journalist and he works in acoustemology. They live together for several years, however the husband tells the woman that he has decided to record a project on the Apache that will take him to Arizona. The woman does not want to go, but realizes her husband is willing to leave her behind. Reluctantly, to slow the breaking of her marriage, she decides that she and the children will go with him to Arizona after which she and the girl, her biological child, will do research on her friend Manuela's daughters, two children who crossed the border seeking asylum and who have since gone missing in federal custody.

As they travel across the U.S. the father tells the children tales of the Apache and Geronimo, while the mother tells them of "Lost Children", Latin American migrants who travel across the border seeking refuge in the U.S. Both children begin to grow obsessed by these stories and combine them in their heads. The boy eventually believes that if he and the girl lose themselves they will be able to find Manuela's children and their parents, who will go searching for them, will be able to retrieve all four of them. The boy decides to leave with the girl, leaving behind a map for his parents to discover telling them they will reunite at Echo Canyon.

The boy and girl run off together, the girl unaware of what they are doing. While making the journey to Echo Canyon the boy reads a book his mother had been reading, Elegies for Lost Children. Eventually the characters of Elegies for Lost Children and the Boy and Girl merge; they meet in the desert where one of the Lost Children mocks the boy for believing he can find Manuela's daughters. The following morning the boy realizes the girl has given away all their supplies to the other children as they are close to being rescued. Miraculously they are, as they are near Echo Canyon.

After their scare the parents try their best to stay united as a family. However the Woman receives a call that Manuela's daughters were found deceased in the desert. The grief breaks the family apart and the mother and the girl depart.

== Translation ==
The novel was translated into Spanish by Luiselli and Daniel Saldaña París with the title Desierto sonoro. It was released in e-book format by Vintage Español, an imprint of Knopf Doubleday, in September 2019 and in paperback format in October 2019.

== Awards and nominations ==
The book was named one of the top ten books of 2019 by The New York Times Book Review. It was a finalist for the 2019 National Book Critics Circle Award for Fiction.

Year	Award	Category	Result	Ref.
2019	Booker Prize	—	Longlisted	
2019	Kirkus Prize	Fiction	Shortlisted	
2019	National Book Critics Circle Award	Fiction	Shortlisted	
2019	Women's Prize for Fiction	—	Longlisted	
2020	Andrew Carnegie Medal for Excellence	Fiction	Won	
2020	Dayton Literary Peace Prize	Fiction	Shortlisted	
2020	Rathbones Folio Prize	—	Won	
2021	Dublin Literary Award	—	Won	

== In Media ==
In the second season of The White Lotus, the character of Harper Spiller (played by Aubrey Plaza) reads Lost Children Archive.
