= Katya Adaui =

Peruvian writer

Katya Adaui (born 14 February 1977) is a Peruvian writer. She was born in Lima, lived in Pueblo Libre and studied journalism at Bausate y Mesa and then creative writing at the Universidad Nacional de Tres de Febrero in Buenos Aires. She won the National Literature Prize of Peru in 2023 in the short story category for her book Geografía de la oscuridad. Her new book of short stories Un nombre para tu isla is a finalist for the 2024 Premio de Narrativa Breve Ribera del Duero.

She is the author of several books, among them the short story collections Un nombre para tu isla (Páginas de Espuma, 2025), Geografía de la oscuridad (Páginas de Espuma, 2021), Aquí hay icebergs (Penguin Random House, 2017) and Algo se nos ha escapado (Criatura Editora, 2013). She has also written 2 novels: Quiénes somos ahora (Random House, Mapa de las Lenguas 2023) and Nunca sabré lo que entiendo (Planeta, 2014); also the children's books: Pedro Paulet, el lector-inventor for the National Library Of Perú, Todo puede ser otra cosa (Mónimo), illustrated by Cecilia Codoni. White Ravens Award 2023, Cuatrogatos Foundation Award 2023 and selected by the Bologna Children's Book Fair in its Braw Amazing Bookshelf 2023, Patichueca (Beascoa) y Muy Muy en Bora Bora (Beascoa).

Adaui's story collection Aquí hay icebergs has been translated by Rosalind Harvey for Charco Press.

She lives in Buenos Aires where she teaches the writing workshop of the Arts of Writing career at the Universidad Nacional de las Artes.
