= Martín Felipe Castagnet =

Argentinian writer

- Born: Martín Felipe María Castagnet; May 31, 1986 (age 39) La Plata, Argentina.
- Occupation: Author
- Education: National University of La Plata (PhD in literature)
- Period: 2012–present

Website
- martinfelipecastagnet.com

Martín Felipe Castagnet is an Argentine novelist and editor of the bilingual journal The Buenos Aires Review. His debut novel Bodies of Summer won the Saint-Nazaire MEET Young Latin American Literature Award and has been translated into English (by Frances Riddle), Italian, French, and Hebrew. His second book Los mantras modernos was published in 2017 and was translated to Romanian. That same year, he was named one of the Bogota39, a list of the most promising young writers in Latin America. In 2021, he was named one of Granta's 25 best young Spanish-language novelists.

Beyond his fiction, Castagnet has written about the Argentine publisher Editorial Minotauro and its founder, the editor and translator Francisco Porrúa, and co-wrote the screenplay for Iván Fund's film El mensaje, which won the Silver Bear Jury Prize at the 75th Berlin International Film Festival.

== Biography ==
Castagnet was born in La Plata on May 31, 1986.. He holds a PhD in literature from the National University of La Plata where he also teaches, and works as a literary translator.

== Bibliography ==
- Los cuerpos del verano (2012). Bodies of Summer, trans. Frances Riddle (Dalkey Archive, 2017)
- Los mantras modernos (2017)
- Unos ojos recién inaugurados (2023)
- Minotauro, una odisea de Paco Porrúa (2023)
