= Valeria Luiselli =

Mexican-American writer (born 1983)

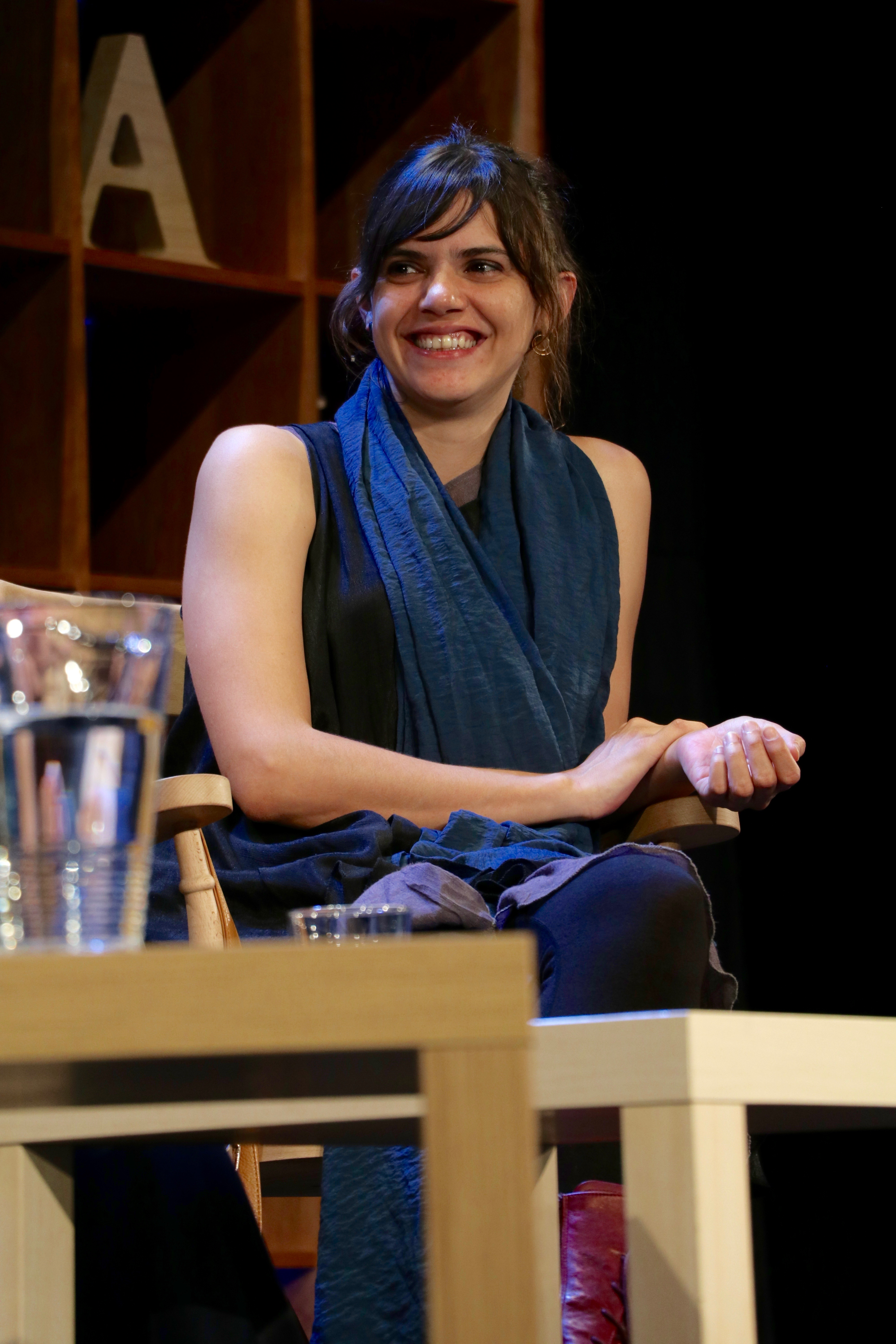
- Luiselli at the 2016 Hay Festival
- Born: August 16, 1983 (age 43); Mexico City, Mexico
- Education: National Autonomous University of Mexico (BA); Columbia University (PhD)
- Occupation: Author
- Writing career
- Period: 2013–present
- Website: valerialuiselli.net

Valeria Luiselli (born August 16, 1983) is a Mexican-American author. She is the author of the book of essays Sidewalks and the novel Faces in the Crowd, which won the Los Angeles Times Art Seidenbaum Award for First Fiction. Luiselli's books have been translated into more than 20 languages, with her work appearing in publications including The New York Times, Granta, McSweeney's, and The New Yorker.

Luiselli's 2015 novel The Story of My Teeth was a finalist for a National Book Critics Circle Award and the Best Translated Book Award, won the Los Angeles Times Book Prize for Fiction, and was awarded the Premio Metropolis Azul. Her book Tell Me How It Ends: An Essay in 40 Questions was a finalist for the Kirkus Prize in Nonfiction and the National Book Critics Circle Award for Criticism. Luiselli's 2019 novel Lost Children Archive won the Carnegie Medal for Excellence in Fiction.

In 2014, Luiselli was the recipient of the National Book Foundation's 5 Under 35 award. In 2019, she won a MacArthur Fellowship. In 2020, the Vilcek Foundation awarded her a Vilcek Prize for Creative Promise in Literature and she won the Folio Prize.

== Early life ==
Luiselli was born in Mexico City, and moved to Madison, Wisconsin, with her family at the age of two. Her father's work in NGOs and later as a diplomat moved the family to Costa Rica, South Korea, and South Africa. After her parents separated, she moved back to Mexico City with her mother at the age of 16. Luiselli attended UWC Mahindra College in India before returning to Mexico. She completed a BA in philosophy at the National Autonomous University of Mexico, and then lived in Spain and France. At age 25, she moved to New York City to pursue a master's degree in Latin American studies and a PhD in comparative literature at Columbia University.

== Career ==
After earning a bachelor's degree in Philosophy from the National Autonomous University of Mexico, Luiselli moved to New York City to dance. She eventually studied comparative literature at Columbia University, where she completed a Ph.D. She teaches literature and creative writing at Bard College, collaborates as a writer with a number of art galleries, and has worked as a librettist for the New York City Ballet. She served as a juror for the Neustadt International Prize for Literature in 2016.

Several of Luiselli's books are based on real-world experiences. The Story of My Teeth (2015) was first written in serial for workers in a Jumex juice factory in Mexico as part of a commission from Galería Jumex. Her nonfiction work Tell Me How It Ends: An Essay in 40 Questions (2017) is based on her experiences volunteering as an interpreter for young Central American migrants seeking legal status in the United States. The book was a finalist for the National Book Critics Circle Award in Criticism in 2017. Her work with asylum-seeking children from Latin America also informs the central theme in her 2019 novel Lost Children Archive.

== Political involvement ==
Luiselli started a literacy program for girls in a detention center in upstate New York that focuses on creative writing. Luiselli is passionate about researching and writing about mass incarceration in the United States, with a focus on detention centers. She is working on a performance piece with the poet Natalie Diaz related to mass incarceration and violence against women.

Luiselli has been interested in writing about and working to improve the plight of asylum-seeking children from Latin America, a theme that is present in her 2020 novel, Lost Children Archive. She began writing Lost Children Archive in 2014 "as a loudspeaker for all of [her] political rage" after having served as a court translator for children from Latin America involved in the migration crisis. The creation of this book was also a reaction to her daughter working to understand the migration crisis for herself. Before completing Lost Children Archive in 2019, Luiselli published Tell Me How It Ends: An Essay in 40 Questions that uses the format of the questions she used in the court when interviewing the children, and includes her own experience with applying for a green card. The time spent writing the essay allowed her to write Lost Children Archive with "more open questions and open ends instead of political stances that are too loud and obvious by themselves".

=== Sidewalks ===
Sidewalks is Luiselli's debut book of essays, in which she explores themes of motion, travel, transition, and reflection.

=== Faces in the Crowd (Los ingrávidos) ===
Faces in the Crowd (2011) is a triptych that follows the perspectives of the narrator, a young mother living and working as a translator in New York, the protagonist of that mother's semi-autobiographical novel, and Gilberto Owen, a 20th-century Mexican poet. These three perspectives are woven together throughout the story.

=== The Story of My Teeth ===
Luiselli's second novel, The Story of My Teeth, tells the story of Gustavo (Highway) Sánchez Sánchez, an auctioneer who claims to sell the teeth of authors and historical figures, and uses the money to purchase the supposed teeth of Marilyn Monroe to replace his own. The Story of My Teeth was written in chapters and distributed to the workers of a juice factory in Mexico. The workers read the chapters out loud and provided comments on them, which Luiselli recorded and took into consideration as she wrote the next chapter.

=== Tell Me How It Ends: An Essay in 40 Questions ===
In this book, Luiselli draws from her experience working as an interpreter for Central American child migrants. The book links the experiences of migrant children risking their lives to come to the United States to Luiselli's own experiences of getting a green card and staying here with her family.

=== Lost Children Archive (Desierto sonoro) ===
Her fifth book, and the first to be written in English. She has said she used it as a loudspeaker for all of her political rage regarding the migration crisis. Lost Children Archive follows a mother, father, and their two children on their journey driving from New York to Arizona in the heat of summer. On the way, they learn about the immigration crisis and learn that they may soon be in a crisis of their own.

=== Beginning Middle End ===
Her sixth book about a road trip between a mother and a daughter in Europe was nominated for the National Book Award in 2026.

== Awards and recognition ==
- 2018: American Book Award for Tell Me How It Ends: An Essay in 40 Questions
- 2019: MacArthur Fellowship
- 2020: Vilcek Prize for Creative Promise in Literature, Vilcek Foundation
- 2020: Folio Prize
- 2021: Dublin Literary Award
- 2023: Royal Society of Literature International Writer

== Bibliography ==
- Papeles falsos (Sexto Piso, 2010). Translated by Christina MacSweeney as Sidewalks (2014)
- Los ingrávidos (Sexto Piso, 2010). Translated by Christina MacSweeney as Faces in the Crowd (2011)
- "Swings of Harlem", published in Where You Are: A Collection of Maps That Will Leave You Feeling Completely Lost (2013)
- La historia de mis dientes (2013). Translated by Christina MacSweeney as The Story of My Teeth (2015)
- Tell Me How It Ends: An Essay in 40 Questions (2016)
- Lost Children Archive (2019). Also translated into Spanish by the author and Daniel Saldaña París as Desierto sonoro (2019)
- Beginning Middle End: A Novel (2026)
