= Cristina Bendek =

Colombian writer

Cristina Bendek (born 1987) is a Colombian writer. She was born on the island of San Andrés off the Caribbean coast of Colombia, and lived in Bogotá and Mexico City. She published her acclaimed debut novel Salt Crystals in 2018. It won the Elisa Mújica National Novel Prize and has been translated into several European languages, including Portuguese and Dutch. The English translation by Robin Myers was published by Charco Press. Bendek has also published Hilar el ritmo: o la búsqueda que no termina.

Bendek lives in Berlin, where she works as a journalist.
