= Claudia Piñeiro =

Argentine novelist and screenwriter (born 1960)

- The author in 2023
- Born: 1960 (age 65–66)
- Writing career
- Genres: Crime fiction, Mystery fiction
- Notable awards: Sor Juana Inés de la Cruz Prize (2010)

Claudia Piñeiro (10 April 1960, Burzaco, Buenos Aires Province) is an Argentine novelist and screenwriter, best known for her crime and mystery novels, most of which became best sellers in Argentina.

== Biography ==
She was born in Burzaco, Buenos Aires province and studied at the University of Buenos Aires. She has won numerous literary prizes, among them the German LiBeraturpreis for Elena Sabe and the Sor Juana Inés de la Cruz Prize for Las grietas de Jara.

Six of her novels have been translated into English by Bitter Lemon Press and Charco Press, as well as adapted into feature films. Her novel Las Grietas de Jara was adapted into the film Dark Buildings (A Crack in the Wall) in 2018, available on Amazon Prime Video. Her novel Elena Knows was also adapted into a film of the same name, which premiered on Netflix in 2023.

In April 2022, her novel Elena Sabe, translated into English by Frances Riddle as Elena Knows, was shortlisted for the International Booker Prize.

== Awards ==
- Premio Clarín de Novela 2005
- Sor Juana Inés de la Cruz Prize 2010
- Premio Pepe Carvalho de novela negra 2018
- Longlist for Barbellion Prize 2021
- Dashiell Hammett Award 2021 for Catedrales.

== Works ==
=== Novels ===
- La muerte ajena (Buenos Aires: Alfaguara, 2025)
- El tiempo de las moscas (Buenos Aires: Alfaguara, 2022)
  - Time of the Flies, tr. Frances Riddle, Charco Press, 2024, ISBN 9781913867867, OCLC 1407211718
- Catedrales (Buenos Aires: Alfaguara, 2020)
- Las maldiciones (Buenos Aires: Alfaguara, 2017)
- Una suerte pequeña (Buenos Aires: Alfaguara 2015)
  - A Little Luck, tr. Frances Riddle, Charco Press, 2023, ISBN 9781913867553, OCLC 1345218659
- Un comunista en calzoncillos (Buenos Aires: Alfaguara, 2013)
- Betibú (Buenos Aires: Alfaguara, 2011).
  - Betty Boo. Bitter Lemon Press, 2016, ISBN 9781908524553, OCLC 990823752
- Las grietas de Jara (Buenos Aires: Alfaguara, 2009)
  - A Crack in the Wall. Bitter Lemon Press, 2013, ISBN 9781908524089, OCLC 937826896
- Elena sabe (Buenos Aires: Alfaguara 2007)
  - Elena Knows, tr. Frances Riddle, Charco Press, 2021, ISBN 9781999368432, OCLC 1175919797
- Tuya (Buenos Aires: Colihue, 2006, Alfaguara, 2008). ISBN 9783125357723, OCLC 890019758
  - All Yours, Bitter Lemon Press, 2012, ISBN 9781904738817, OCLC 785512951
- Las viudas de los jueves (Buenos Aires: Alfaguara, 2005, 2011 Madrid: Alfaguara, 2012). ISBN 9789507827150, OCLC 912629430
  - Thursday Night Widows, tr. Miranda France, Bitter Lemon Press, 2009, ISBN 9781904738411, OCLC 318877323

=== Theatre ===
- Con las manos atadas, 2013 Buenos Aires: Interzona, 2013
- Tres viejas plumas, 2008 Buenos Aires: Interzona, 2013
- Morite, gordo, 2007 Buenos Aires: Interzona, 2013
- Verona, 2007 Buenos Aires: Interzona, 2013
- Un mismo árbol verde, 2006 Buenos Aires: Interzona, 2013
- Cuánto vale una heladera Buenos Aires: Ministerio de Educación, 2005; Interzona, 2013
- Obra teatral Buenos Aires: Interzona, 2013, 203 pp. (consists of all the theater plays mentioned above)

=== Stories for children ===
- Serafín, el escritor y la bruja (Buenos Aires: Ed. Don Bosco 2000, Alfaguara 2011, 85 pp. Barcelona: Edebé 2000, 2007).
- Un ladrón entre nosotros (Bogotá: Norma 2005, 92 pp.).

=== For young readers ===
- El fantasma de las invasiones inglesas (Buenos Aires: Norma 2010, 126 pp.)
