= Álvaro Cepeda Samudio =

Colombian writer (1926–1972)

Álvaro Cepeda Samudio (March 30, 1926 – October 12, 1972) was a Colombian journalist, novelist, short story writer, and filmmaker.

Within Colombia and Latin America, Cepeda Samudio is known as an important writer and journalist, credited with having a large influence on much of the artistic, intellectual and political climate of mid-20th century Colombia.

Cepeda Samudio is less famous outside his home country. Internationally, he is known primarily as part of the influential artistic and intellectual circle in Colombia that included fellow writer and journalist Gabriel García Márquez—with whom he was also a member of the more particularized Barranquilla Group—and painter Alejandro Obregón, among others. Only one of his works, La casa grande, has received much notice beyond the Spanish-speaking world, having been translated into several languages, including English and French.

== Early life and education ==
Álvaro Cepeda Samudio was born in Barranquilla (although his birthplace is commonly mistaken for the town of Ciénaga, where his family was from), Colombia, two years before striking United Fruit Company workers at Ciénaga's railroad station were massacred by the Colombian army, an event that with age became pivotal to the writer's social- and political-consciousness, as evidenced in its central role in his only novel, La casa grande. Known as the Santa Marta Massacre, the incident is also depicted in Cien años de soledad (One Hundred Years of Solitude) (1967), the seminal novel of his close friend Gabriel García Márquez, and served a similar motivating principle in his dedication to social and political awareness through journalism and literature, among other means. He enrolled at the Colegio Americano, an English-language school in Barranquilla, for elementary and high school. In the spring of 1949, he traveled to Ann Arbor, MI, United States and attended the University of Michigan English Language Institute for the summer term. For the fall term in the 1949–50 school year he attended Columbia University Graduate School of Journalism in New York City. For the winter term, he attended what is now Michigan State University (then Michigan State College) in Lansing, MI before returning home to Barranquilla.

== Journalistic career ==
As with many of the core members of the Barranquilla Group, Cepeda Samudio began his career as a journalist, writing first, in August 1947, for El Nacional, where his first short stories were also published. Along with García Márquez and fellow journalists and Barranquilla Group members Alfonso Fuenmayor and Germán Vargas, he founded the weekly newspaper Crónica in April 1950, dedicating its pages primarily to literature and sports reporting. Cepeda Samudio made the point to include, for the first eight months of its publication, a foreign short story in each issue. He also spent time writing columns for the Barranquilla daily newspaper El Heraldo, for which his wife, Tita Cepeda, currently contributes cultural columns. In 1953, he was offered the general management position of this paper, which he accepted with great enthusiasm, telling García Márquez that he wanted to transform it "into the modern newspaper he had learned how to make in the United States", at Columbia University. However, it was "a fatal adventure," owing, García Márquez suggests, to the fact that "some aging veterans could not tolerate the renovatory regime and conspired with their soulmates until they succeeded in destroying their empire." Cepeda Samudio left the paper shortly thereafter. He was also the Colombian bureau chief for Sporting News, based out of St. Louis, and ultimately secured his position as one of his country's preeminent journalists and editors by becoming the editor-in-chief first of El Nacional and later of the Diario del Caribe.

== Literary career and outlook ==
Cepeda Samudio's desire for a "renovatory regime" extended, however, far beyond his influence over La Nacional. Writing for his column Brújula de la cultura (Cultural Compass) in El Heraldo, he consistently decried a need for "a renovation of Colombian prose fiction". He avidly sought out and championed what would have been, particularly at the time and in the considerably culturally conservative Colombia, considered "unorthodox" literature to many of his friends, notably García Márquez and other members of the Barranquilla Group, by introducing many to Ernest Hemingway and William Faulkner. In his column in El Heraldo acclaimed the innovations of Bestiario (1951), the first volume of short stories by Julio Cortázar.

His promotion of the need for innovative literary styles and means, particularly within Colombia, is found in more than simply his essayistic criticism and columns, however, and he went on to write two short story collections and a novel in which his ideals found themselves manifested. His first published short story collection, Todos estábamos a la espera (We Were All Waiting) (1954), bears the markings of his interest in Hemingway, and created a considerable publishing event among academic critics of the time. Seymour Menton, who translated La Casa Grande into English, states that the first story in the collection "is narrated in the first person by the protagonist without any intervention by the traditional moralizing and artistic omniscient narrator." This full embrace of a greater psychological impulse within the stories, as well as a rejection of any mediating contextualizations, was among the many claims Cepeda Samudio made for the necessary "modernization" of literature. García Márquez would later state that Todos estábamos a la espera "was the best book of stories that had been published in Colombia".

His first novel, La casa grande (1962) further explores this narrative reliance on a singular, unmediated narrator, and experiments, in a manner he hadn't displayed before, with structure, breaking the narrative up into ten distinct sections. His adoration of the works of Faulkner can perhaps be most fully seen in this work. In addressing the events of the Santa Marta Massacre through disjointed narratives which circumnavigate the violence without fully delving into the actualities of it, the central actions and content of the novel are presented as the inner reactions to them on the part of those associated with the event, not as an expository account of the event itself; García Márquez states that "everything in this book is a magnificent example of how a writer can honestly filter out the immense quantity of rhetorical and demagogic garbage that stands in the way of indignation and nostalgia." Menton suggests that, in this way, it "is one of the important forerunners of One Hundred Years of Solitude," and García Márquez elaborates, "it represents a new and formidable contribution to the most important literary phenomenon in today's world: the Latin American novel."

Cepeda Samudio's final publication of fiction was the short story collection Los Cuentos de Juana (1972), with illustrations by his good friend Alejandro Obregón. One of the short stories was developed into a film, Juana Tenía el Pelo de Oro, which was released in Colombia in 2006.

== Film career ==
Cepeda Samudio harbored an intense love and knowledge of films, and often wrote film criticisms in his columns. García Márquez writes that his career as a film critic would not have been possible without "the traveling school of Álvaro Cepeda". The two eventually made a short black-and-white feature together called La langosta azul (The Blue Lobster) (1954), which they co-wrote and directed based on an idea by Cepeda Samudio; García Márquez states that he agree to take part as "it had a large dose of lunacy to make it seem like ours." The film continued to make occasional appearances at international film festivals, with the help of Cepeda Samudio's wife, Tita Cepeda.

== Late life ==
Cepeda Samudio died in 1972, the year that his final collection of short stories, Los cuentos de Juana, was released, of lymphatic cancer, the same condition which his lifelong friend García Márquez was diagnosed with in 1999. In his memoir, Vivir para contarla (Living to Tell the Tale) (2002), García Márquez writes that his friend was "more than anything a dazzling driver—of automobiles as well as letters." The influence of Cepeda Samudio, not solely on the works of later Colombian and Latin American writers, but also on García Márquez, is evident not only in the latter writer's confessions in his autobiography of "imitating" his friend, but also in his clear admiration for his literary abilities. In his short story, "The Incredible and Sad Tale of Innocent Eréndira and her Heartless Grandmother" (1978), written in the year of Cepeda Samudio's death and published six years later in a collection of the same name, the third-person narrative takes a brief and sudden digression into the first-person, informing the reader that "Álvaro Cepeda Samudio, who was also traveling in the region, selling beer-cooling equipment, took me through the desert towns" of which the story, and most of the stories in the collection, take place, suggesting the sharedness of the lands traversed in his stories with his polymath "driver" friend. In the final chapter of One Hundred Years of Solitude, the fictionalized Barranquilla Group, referred to as the "four friends", leaves Macondo, "Álvaro" being the first among them. In preparation for his departure, the narrator states that Álvaro

bought an eternal ticket on a train that never stopped traveling. In the postcards that he sent from the way stations he would describe with shouts the instantaneous images that he had seen from the window of his coach, and it was as if he were tearing up and throwing into oblivion some long, evanescent poem.

== Bibliography ==
=== Fiction ===
- Todos estábamos a la espera (1954)
- La casa grande (1962)
- Los cuentos de Juana (1972)

=== Nonfiction ===
- Álvaro Cepeda Samudio: Antólogia, edited by Daniel Samper Pisano (2001)

=== Film ===
- La langosta azul (1954)
- Un carnival para toda la vida (1961)
