= Ave Barrera =

Mexican writer (born 1980)

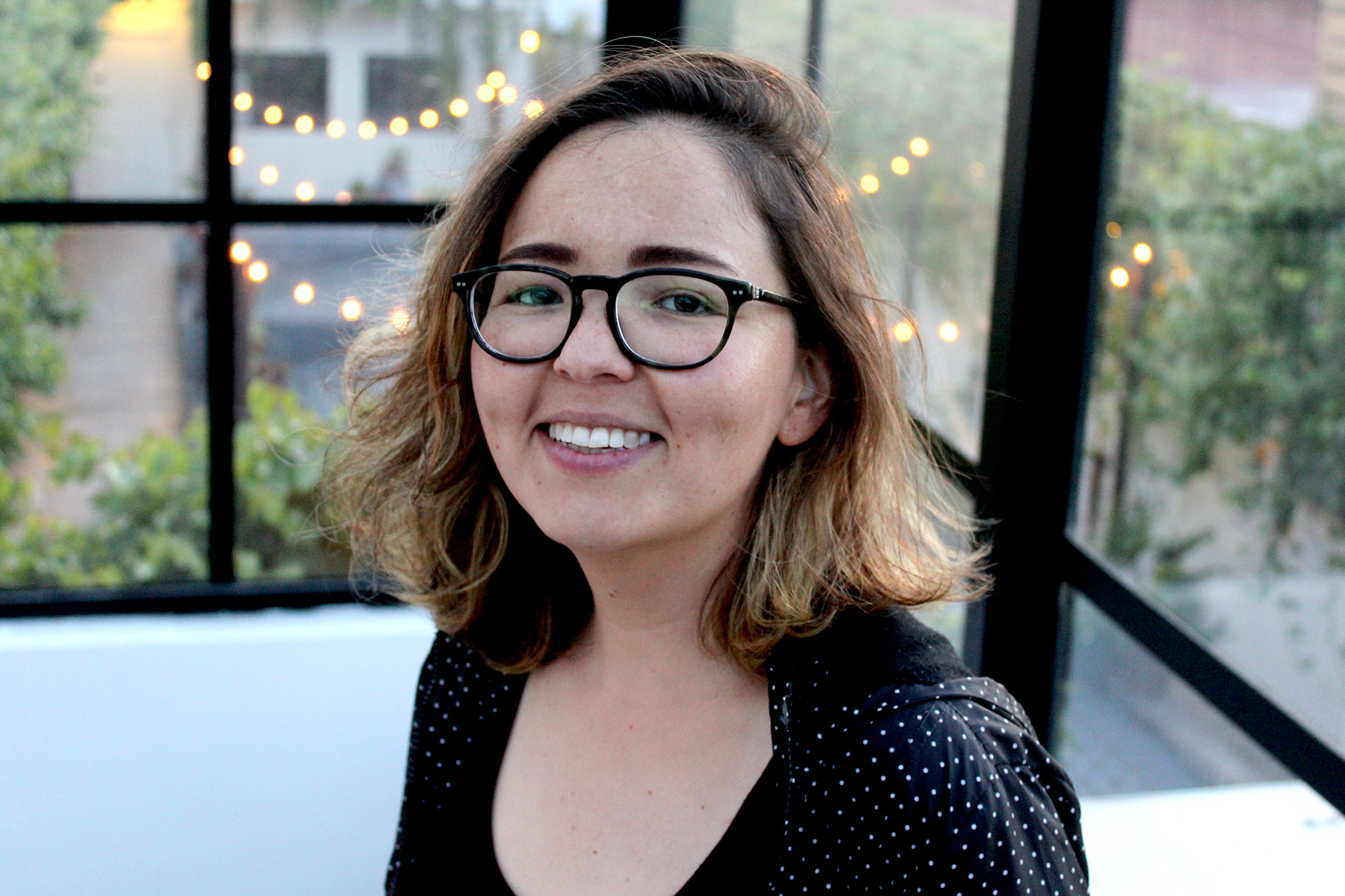
Ave Barrera

Ave Barrera (born 1980) is a Mexican writer. She was born and raised in Guadalajara. She studied Hispanic Literature at the University of Guadalajara; she has also studied at Complutense University in Madrid. She has worked as an editor, copywriter and ghostwriter.

As an author, she has published short stories, novels and children's books. Her debut novel Puertas demasiado pequeñas won the Sergio Galindo Award from Veracruzana University. It was translated into English by Robin Myers and Ellen Jones as The Forgery, and published by Charco Press.

Other novels include Tratado de la vida marina and Restauración. The latter was also translated into English by Myers and Jones and published by Charco Press as Restoration. Her short stories have appeared in anthologies such as Río entre las piedras and El hambre heroica.

She lives in México City.
