= Enrique de Hériz =

Spanish writer and translator (1964-2019)

Enrique de Hériz (1964 – 14 March 2019) (Note: The El País article was published at 00:02 CET on 15 March 219 so "Ha muerto hoy a causa del cáncer [...]" ("He died today due to cancer [...]") meant 14 March 2019.) was a Spanish writer, translator, and literary critic. He was born in Barcelona and studied Spanish Philology at the University of Barcelona. At an early age he achieved prominence as a translator and an editor. Among the authors whose books he helped to produce in Spanish were Annie Proulx, Nadine Gordimer, Stephen King, Peter Carey, and John Fowles. He also produced the first full Spanish translation of Robinson Crusoe.

In 2000, he left his job as editorial director at Ediciones B, a Spanish publisher and division of Penguin Random House, to become a full-time writer. He won the Premio de Narración Breve de la UNED prize in 2003 for his short story Sorda, pero ruidosa ("Deaf, but Noisy"). He wrote a series of acclaimed novels, among them Mentira ("Lies", 2004) and Manual de la oscuridad ("The Manual of Darkness", 2009). Mentira won the Llibreter Prize for narrative in 2004, which is awarded by the Guild of Booksellers of Catalonia. It was translated into English, as Lies, by John Cullen (Weidenfeld & Nicolson, 2007, ISBN 9780297851073) and was the runner-up for the Premio Valle-Inclán in 2007. The Manual of Darkness was translated into English in 2011 by Frank Wynne (Weidenfeld & Nicolson, ISBN 9780297860525) .

De Hériz died of lung cancer in 2019 at the age of 55. He was survived by his wife Yolanda Cespedosa, an editor, and two children.
