= Cross-Stitch (novel) =

2023 novel by Jazmina Barrera

- Cross-Stitch book jacket
- Author: Jazmina Barrera
- Audio read by: Jimena Guerra (Punto de cruz)
- Original title: Punto de cruz
- Translator: Christina MacSweene
- Language: Spanish or English
- Subject: Coming of Age, Female friendships, Embroidery
- Genre: Fiction
- Set in: Mexico City, London, Paris
- Published: Mexico, United States
- Publisher: Editorial Almadía, Two Lines Press
- Publication date: 2021
- Publication place: Mexico and the United States
- English publication date: November, 2023
- Pages: 182
- ISBN: 9781949641530
- OCLC: 1372569209

Cross-Stitch (Spanish: Punto de cruz) is a novelized coming of age story that also focuses on significant female friendship. It was written by Jazmina Barrera and translated from the Spanish by Christina MacSweeney. The book was published in November, 2023 by Two Lines Press. This book was originally published in 2021 by Editorial Almadía in Oaxaca, México under the Spanish-language title Punto de cruz

== Plot summary ==
Mila, the protagonist, is an author and mother. She is initially characterized as overwhelmed by writing a new book and caring for her young child. Her focus is shifted when she receives a message on Facebook from the aunt of her childhood friend, Citlali, telling her that Citlali has drowned off the coast of Senegal. Mila agrees to help with plans for the funeral. At the same time, Mila begins to reflect on her past. A trip to Europe with Citlali and another close friend, Dalia, stands out in her mind as well as her experiences with these two friends growing up in Mexico City. "Their interests in literature, art, and, especially, embroidery bind them together." She sees that the three women went on different life-paths toward maturity, yet it seems to Mila that Citlali's well being declined over the long term, preceding her death. Much of the narrative follows the history of the trio's friendship from junior high school to the present. Michelle Johnson, while interviewing this author for World Literature Today, says, "Embroidery works thematically throughout the novel, running through both the story of the three friends and the alternating fragments about embroidery, which often give insight into the history of embroidery as art and protest, even as a coded means of communication."

== Reception ==
The Chicago Review of Books says, "Stitches, secrets, shame...Barrera stitches a female coming-of-age story together with a feminist history and theory of embroidery, and it consumed my entire day." Emma Specter writing for Vogue magazine says, " If you have yet to dive into Jazmina Barrera's Cross-Stitch—a young mother's reflections on youth, the passage of time, and the meaning of female friendship, blending Sally Rooney-esque interpersonal chaos with a clean, graceful prose style—in its original Spanish, then you're in luck. An English-language version of the novel [is available]."

According to Andrea Montejo, of Publishers Weekly, "The multilayered novel alternates between the story of the girls' lives and an elegant study of embroidery's significance in Mayan myths, the novels of Jean Rhys, the sculptures of Louise Bourgeois, and more." Alice Cary, writing for Book Page magazine, says, "Jazmina Barrera weaves, braids and composes this story of a trio of friends into a plot so convincing and emotionally intelligent that readers may mistake it for a memoir." Michelle Johnson, writing for World Literature Today, says that "Cross-Stitch is an engrossing story bound together by a brilliant use of [a] theme."
