= Brickmakers =

2013 novel by Selva Almada

Ladrilleros
- First edition cover
- Author: Selva Almada
- Language: Spanish
- Genre: Romance, fiction
- Publisher: Mardulce
- Publication date: 2013
- Publication place: Argentina
- ISBN: 978-8-439-73918-0

Brickmakers (Spanish: Ladrilleros) is a novel by Argentine writer Selva Almada. It was published in 2013 by Mardulce. The book tells story of two male lovers from a rural region in Argentina, and the enmity that develop between their families, which are involved in brickmaking.

== Synopsis ==
The novel begins in an amusement park where Pájaro Tamai and Marciano Miranda lie dying. They recall the story of the rivalry between their families. Marciano is the son of Elvio and Estela Miranda, traditionally from a family of brick makers. Pájaro is the son of Celina and Oscar Tamai, and was born into a family which was engaged in agriculture. However, they rent a house near the Mirandas' with the plan to engage in brick making. An enmity between Oscar and Elvio regarding the theft of a dog, and continues to escalate with time by a series of unfortunate events.

Marciano and Pájaro are best friends since their childhood despite the enmity between their parents, but are forced to gradually separate and each later forms separate groups of friends amongst whom rivalry develops. The conflict between Elvio and Oscar takes a turn for worse when Elvio is mysteriously murdered, leading police to investigate Oscar. However, though the police realize that Oscar had nothing to do with the murder, Oscar deeply regrets the murder and later runs away abandoning Celina and their children.

One day Pajero learns that Marciano had started a new love relationship. He plans to lure him away, and decides to get more information from Marciano's younger brother, Angel, who was rumored to be homosexual. After Pajero meets Angel, he falls in love with him. When he meets Angel again, he gets drunk and ends up having sexual relation with him. Although Pajero tries to resist the attraction he feels, he is overwhelmed by his feelings for Angel. Both begin a relationship, which they try to keep it a secret. However, soon the news spreads and reaches Marciano. Marciano is angered by this, and confronts Pajero with a knife. They both end up attacking each other, which leads to the tragedy with which the novel begins.

== Author and development ==
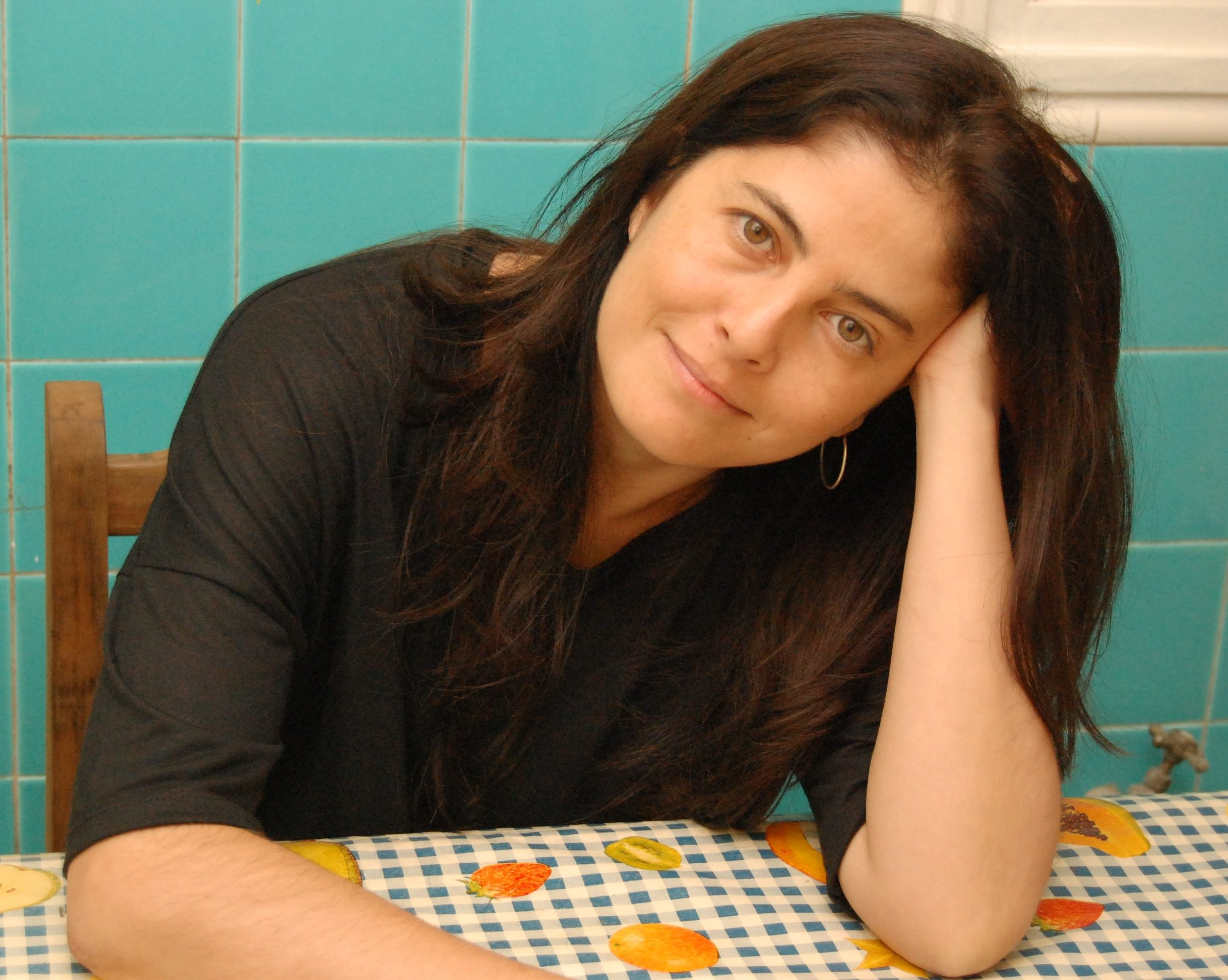
Selva Almada in 2012

The plot for the novel was born from a real life story about two families who clashed in an amusement park in the Chaco Province which resulted in death and injuries on both sides. As both the families were engaged in brick manufacturing, Almada was particularly affected by this as some of her relatives were also brick-layers. She based some of the characteristics of the protagonists' parents on her uncle, Lolo Bertone, who was a bricksmith and lived on a ranch alone. It is also dedicated to Bertone, who died while Almada was writing the novel.

The book took Almada about two years to write. According to the author, she mixed the language of the Chaco area with that of Buenos Aires to bring out the language spoken by the brick layers.

== Reception ==
El Cultural called Almada an "excellent narrator" and the novel as "a firm, brilliant text of great lexical richness and a lot of flight". In an article for the newspaper El País, writer and journalist Cristian Alarcón Casanova asserted that Almada possessed a "deep knowledge of the logics of men" and their "struggle for phallic power". Aloma Rodríguez, in a review for the magazine Letras Libres, appreciated the language used by the author, while criticizing some areas of the plot. The language also drew praise by Osvaldo Quiroga, in an article written in Télam.

Writer Patricio Pron gave a largely negative review although he asserted that it had "some merits". Among the aspects he criticized is the language of the work, which he described as "clumsy", specifically for the mixture of colloquial language with academic words.

== See also ==
- LGBTQ literature in Argentina
