= Selva Almada =

Argentine writer (born 1973)

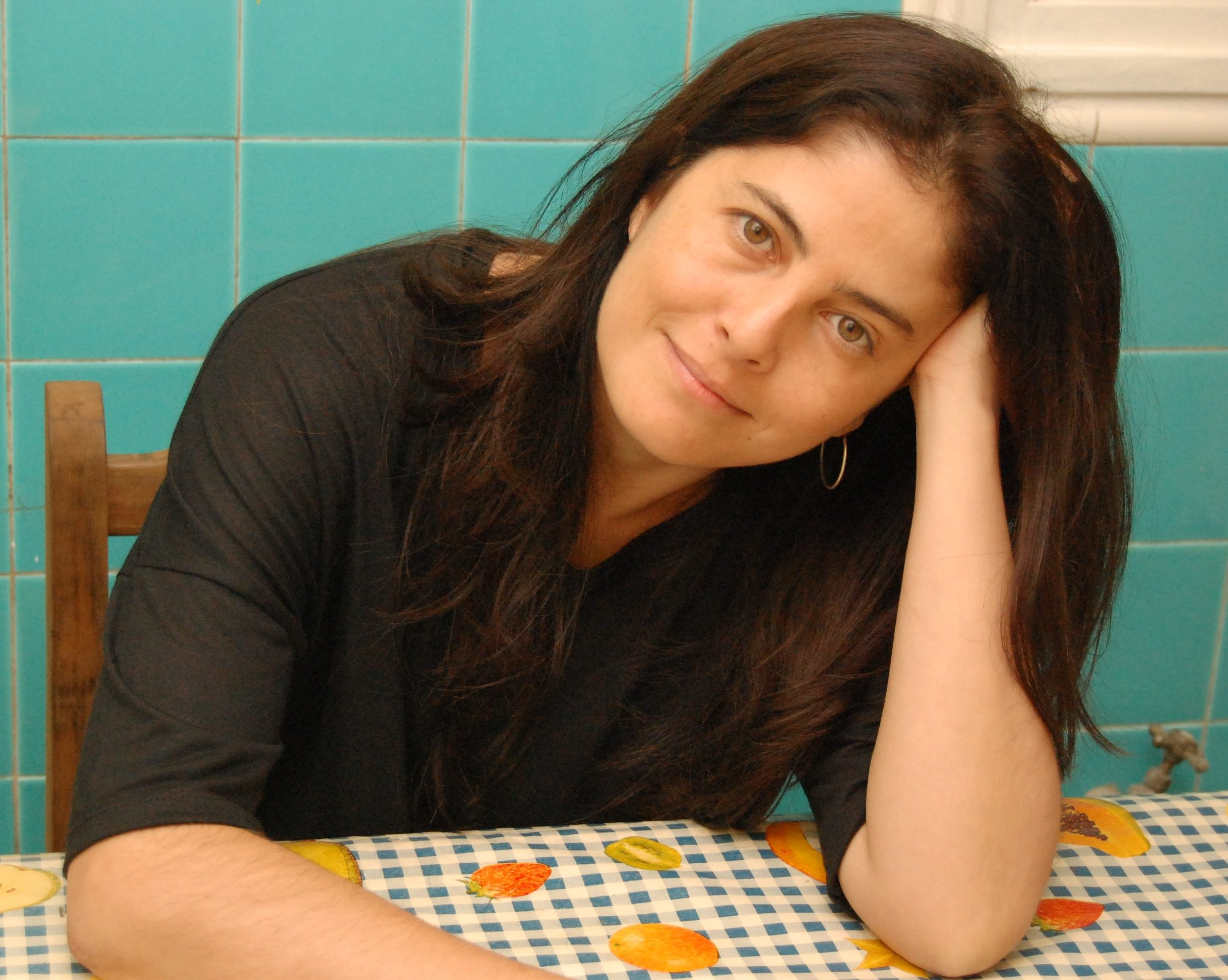
- Almada in 2012
- Born: 5 April 1973 (age 53); Villa Elisa, Entre Ríos, Argentina
- Occupation: Writer

Selva Almada (born 5 April 1973) is an Argentine writer of poetry, short stories, and novels. She expanded into nonfiction in 2014 with the book Chicas muertas.

== Career ==
Selva Almada studied Social Communication in Paraná, although she left this program to enter the Professorship of Literature at Paraná's Institute of Higher Education. She began giving shape to her first works, some of which were developed from the workshop that María Elena Lotringer offered at the School of Communication.

Her first stories were published in the Paraná weekly Análisis. From 1997 to 1998, she directed a brief self-managed cultural literary project called CAelum Blue.

Her apprenticeship as a storyteller was largely established in Buenos Aires in the creative space of Alberto Laiseca's literary workshop. Her authority as a writer has been publicly confirmed by literary figures such as Chilean writer Diego Zúñiga and the journalist, writer, and essayist Beatriz Sarlo. Her stories have been included in various anthologies published by Norma, Mondadori, and Ediciones del Dock, among others.

She gives various literary workshops. From March to July 2017, she directed the Taller de relato autobiográfico Mirarse el ombligo ("Navel Gazing Autobiographical Story Workshop") at Escuela Entrepalabras.

=== Trilogía de varones ===
Her literary output gained prestige and praise from critics in 2012 with the publication of her first novel, El viento que arrasa. Clarín's magazine Revista Ñ highlighted it as "the novel of the year". It has since been reissued several times, was published abroad, and translated into French, Portuguese, Dutch, and German. In 2016, it was the basis for an opera by Beatriz Catani and Luis Menacho. First published in English as The Wind that Lays Waste (translated by Chris Andrews), the novel became the first in the so-called "trilogy of men", followed in 2013 by Ladrilleros (translated as Brickmakers by Annie McDermott in 2021) and No es un río in 2021 (tr. Not a River, 2024).

In 2021, it was reported El viento que arrasa was in the works to be adapted into a film, directed by Paula Hernández and co-produced by Argentine studios Rizoma and Tarea Fina, and Uruguayan studio Cimarrón.

=== Chicas muertas ===
With her nonfiction chronicle Chicas muertas, Almada brought to light three femicides that occurred in different Argentine provinces in the 1980s, making herself known as a feminist writer. An English translation, Dead Girls by Annie McDermott, was published by Charco Press in 2020.

== Personal life ==
Selva Almada was born in Villa Elisa in the province of Entre Ríos, and lived there until she was 17. In 1991 she moved to Paraná to study, first Social Communication, then Literature, and lived in that city until 1999. Since 2000 she has lived in Buenos Aires.

She made frequent trips to the province of Chaco which, along with her rural experience of childhood and youth spent in the Argentine Littoral, gave rise to several of the environments and themes of her books.

== Works ==
- 2003: Mal de muñecas. Editorial Carne Argentina. Poetry. ISBN 9872072108.
- 2005: Niños. Editorial de la Universidad de La Plata. Novella. ISBN 9789503403358.
- 2007: Una chica de provincia. Editorial Gárgola. Short stories. ISBN 9789876130646.
- 2012: El viento que arrasa. Mardulce Editora. Novel. ISBN 9788494286940.
- 2012: Intemec. Editorial Los Proyectos. Short stories. ISBN 9789872850517. (e-book)
- 2013: Ladrilleros. Mardulce Editora. Novel. ISBN 9788426400666.
- 2014: Chicas muertas. Random House. Chronicle. ISBN 9789873650314.
- 2015: El desapego es una manera de querernos. Random House. Short stories (compilation). ISBN 9789873987007.
- 2017: El mono en el remolino: Notas del Rodaje de Zama de Lucrecia Martel. Random House. ISBN 9789873987595.
- 2021: No es un río. Random House. ISBN 978-8439738909.

== Works in translation ==
- 2019: The Wind That Lays Waste. Graywolf Press. Novel. English trans. of El viento que arrasa by Chris Andrews. ISBN 978-1555978457.
- 2020: Dead Girls. Charco Press. Non-fiction. English trans of Chicas muertas by Annie McDermott. ISBN 9781916277847
- 2021: Brickmakers. Charco Press. Novel. English trans. of Ladrilleros by Annie McDermott. ISBN 978-1913867065
- 2024: Not a River. Charco Press. Novel. English trans. of No es un río by Annie McDermott. ISBN 9781913867454.

== Awards ==
- 2010: Fondo Nacional de las Artes Fellowship
- 2014: Finalist for the Tigre Juan Award for Ladrilleros
- 2015: Finalist for the Rodolfo Walsh Award for Chicas muertas
- 2024: Shortlisted for the International Booker Prize for Not a River (translated by Annie McDermott)
- 2025: Longlisted for the International Dublin Literary Award for Not a River
