= The Story of My Teeth =

2013 novel by Valeria Luiselli

First edition (publ. Sexto Piso)

The Story of My Teeth (La historia de mis dientes) is a 2013 Spanish-language novel by Valeria Luiselli, translated into English in 2015 by Christina MacSweeney. The novel tells the story of Gustavo "Highway" Sánchez Sánchez, an auctioneer in Mexico City who auctions off various historical and literary figures' teeth. Originally commissioned as an exhibition catalog for Galería Jumex, the novel was written in collaboration with workers at a Jumex factory in Ecatepec. Luiselli would submit chapters for lectors to read to the factory workers, who would then send recordings of their discussions back to Luiselli. The English-language edition also features a chapter written by Luiselli's translator MacSweeney. The novel was a finalist for the 2015 National Book Critics Circle Award in fiction.
