= Barranquilla Group =

The Barranquilla Group was the name given to the group of writers, journalists, and philosophers who congregated in the Colombian city of Barranquilla in the middle of the twentieth century; it became one of the most productive intellectual and literary communities of the period.

Among the most influential and notable members were Gabriel García Márquez, Álvaro Cepeda Samudio, Germán Vargas Cantillo, and Alfonso Fuenmayor, all of whom also comprise the fictionalized Barranquilla Group referred to as the "four friends" of Macondo in Cien Años de Soledad (One Hundred Years of Solitude) (1967), by García Márquez. They were all journalists at the onset of the informal group, working mostly for El Nacional, El Heraldo, and El Universal; most were also novelists and poets, often publishing their own literary work in the hitherto-mentioned newspapers. Another "itinerant" member, as García Márquez refers to him in his memoir, Vivir para contarla (Living to Tell the Tale) (2002), was José Félix Fuenmayor, the father of Alfonso, who was also a journalist, as well as an acclaimed poet and novelist. Referring to the group in his memoir, García Márquez writes

Never did I feel, as I did in those days, so much a part of that city and the half-dozen friends who were beginning to be known as the Barranquilla Group in the journalistic and intellectual circles of the country. They were young writers and artists who exercised a certain leadership in the cultural life of the city, guided by the Catalan master Don Ramón Vinyes, a legendary dramatist and bookseller who had been consecrated in the Espasa Encyclopedia since 1924.
