= Frances Riddle =

- Education: Louisiana State University
- Alma mater: University of Buenos Aires
- Occupation: Translator

Frances Riddle (born in Raleigh, North Carolina. Grew up in Houston, Texas) is an American-born literary translator, specializing in the translation of contemporary Latin American literature into English.

She has a BA in Spanish Language and Literature from Louisiana State University and an MA in Translation Studies from the University of Buenos Aires. To date, she has translated more than a dozen novels for leading translation houses such as New Directions Publishing, Dalkey Archive Press and Charco Press. Originally from Houston, Texas, she lives in Buenos Aires, Argentina.

In April 2022, Riddle's translation of Claudia Piñeiro's novel Elena Knows was shortlisted for the International Booker Prize.

== Selected translations ==
- A Simple Story: The Last Malambo by Leila Guerriero
- Slum Virgin by Gabriela Cabezón Cámara
- Bodies of Summer by Martín Felipe Castagnet
- The German Room by Carla Maliandi
- The Abandoned House by Mario Levrero
- The Life and Deaths of Ethel Jurado by Gregorio Casamayor
- Cockfight by María Fernanda Ampuero
- Not One Less by María Pía López
- Plebian Prose by Néstor Perlongher
- Theatre of War by Andrea Jeftanovic
- Elena Knows by Claudia Piñeiro
- Violeta by Isabel Allende
- My Name is Emilia del Valle by Isabel Allende
