= Jazmina Barrera =

Mexican writer

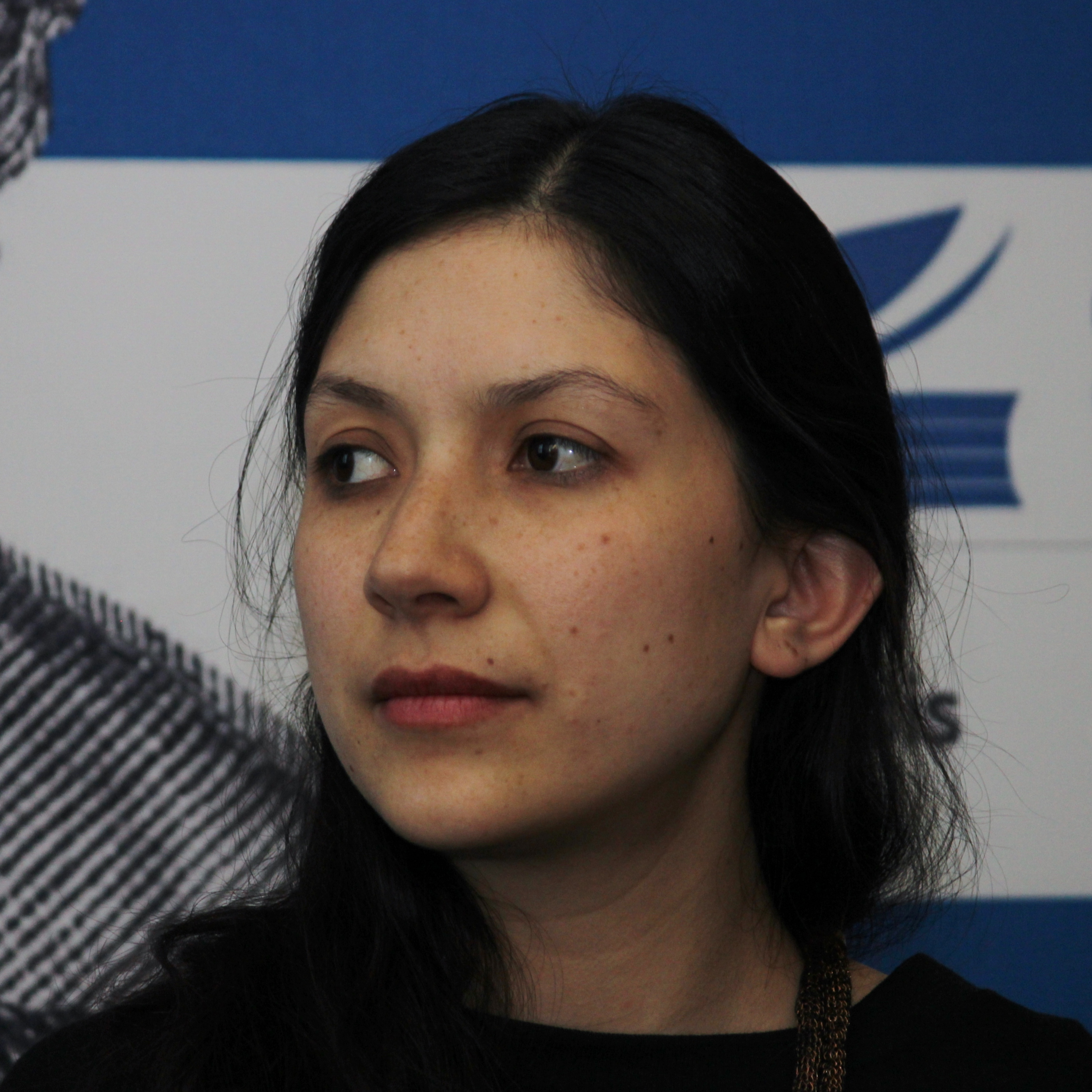
Barrera in 2018

Jazmina Barrera (born 10 March 1988) is a Mexican writer. She is the author of Cuerpo extraño (Literal Publishing, 2013), Cuaderno de faros (Tierra Adentro, 2017), Línea negra (Almadía, 2021) and Punto de cruz (Almadía, 2021). Her books have been published in eight countries and translated into English, Italian, Dutch and Catalan. She is the co-founder of Ediciones Antílope.

== Professional career ==
Born in Mexico City, she studied modern English literature at the National Autonomous University of Mexico (UNAM) and received an MA in creative writing in Spanish from New York University on a Fulbright Scholarship. Her work has appeared in prestigious publications such as The Paris Review, El País, Malpensante, The New York Times and Letras Libres. She was a fellow of the Foundation for Mexican Letters in 2012 and 2014. In 2013 she won the Latin American Voices Prize for Cuerpo extraño. In 2015 she co-founded Ediciones Antílope with Isabel Zapata, Marina Azahua, Astrid López Méndez and César Tejeda.

In 2021 she received a grant from the Young Creators Programme of the Fondo Nacional para la Cultura y las Artes (FONCA) and was selected for a residency at Casa Estudio Cien Años de Soledad. She lives in Mexico City. She is married to the Chilean writer Alejandro Zambra, with whom she has a son.

== Selected works ==
- On Lighthouses. Two Lines Press. May 12, 2020 ISBN 9781949641011
- Linea Nigra. Two Lines Press. May 3, 2022. ISBN 9781949641585
- Cross-Stitch. Two Lines Press. November 7, 2023. ISBN 9781949641530
- The Queen of Swords. Two Lines Press. November 11, 2025 ISBN 9781949641875
