= Cine.ar Play =

Argentine video-on-demand platform

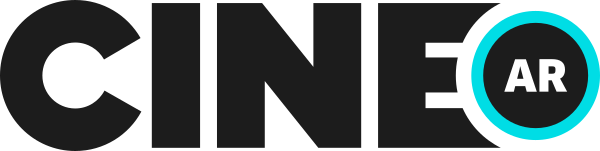
- Website type: Streaming video
- Available in: Spanish
- Predecessor: ODEON
- Headquarters: Buenos Aires, Argentina
- Country of origin: Argentina
- Area served: Worldwide
- Owner: INCAA
- Creators: INCAA; ARSAT
- Industry: Entertainment
- Products: Streaming media; video on demand
- Website: play.cine.ar
- Advertising: No
- Commercial: No
- Registration: Required
- Users: ▲1.38 million (As of 7 April 2020)
- Launched: December 2015; 10 years ago as ODEON
- Native clients on: Android; iOS; Samsung Smart TVs; LG Smart TVs

Cine.ar Play is an Argentine video streaming platform, offering access to films, TV series, documentaries and short films made in Argentina. Most of the content is made with the support of INCAA, which is also the owner of Cine.ar Play and its sister TV channel, Cine.ar TV.

== History ==
=== Establishment as Odeon ===
Cine.ar play launched in December 2015 with the name of Odeon. This new platform, created by the Argentina national film authority (INCAA) with technological support form ARSAT, aimed to be a new display window for the Argentine cinema industry, planning on offering first a free period, and then launching as a subscription platform, which never came to an end. On its first days, Odeon reached 150,000 users. The development costed 3,4 million USD (34 million pesos of 2015) and lasted 18 months.

INCAA was in charge of curating audiovisual content, managing exhibition rights, and the platform design. On the other hand, the state-owned telco ARSAT managed the technological aspects of the project: content storage and transmission.

It was also meant as a new income source of royalties for several copyright collectives in Argentina: Directores Argentinos Cinematográficos (Film director), SAGAI (Sociedad Argentina de Gestión de Actores e Intérpretes; actors), SADAIC (musicians), Argentores (screenwriters).

=== Relaunch as Cine.ar Play ===
In March 2017, as a new government had taken office, it was decided that the service would be relaunched as Cine.ar Play along a rebrand of its sister channel INCAA TV, which was renamed to Cine.ar TV and relaunched as a high-definition channel.

Also, the failed subscription serviced initially planned was replaced with a new Pay-per-view feature called Estrenos (Premieres), in which movies premiere simultaneously as in theaters. It was also announced that the platform would now have native clients on several Smart TV platforms, and an iOS native app.

== International ==
In May 2017, Cine.ar Play was launched internationally, with limited programming at an initial stage. As of September 2019, it had reached 200,000 international users.

An integration with the VOD services of Latin-American TV providers is being negotiated.
