= Carla Maliandi =

Argentine writer and theatre director

- Occupations: Writer and theatre director
- Writing career
- Language: Spanish
- Notable work: The German Room

Carla Maliandi is an Argentine writer and theatre director.

== Career ==
Maliandi's first novel The German Room was published to widespread acclaim and has been translated into English, French and German. She is also active on the Buenos Aires theatre scene, where she has written and/or directed a number of plays.
