= Daniel Saldaña París =

Mexican poet and novelist

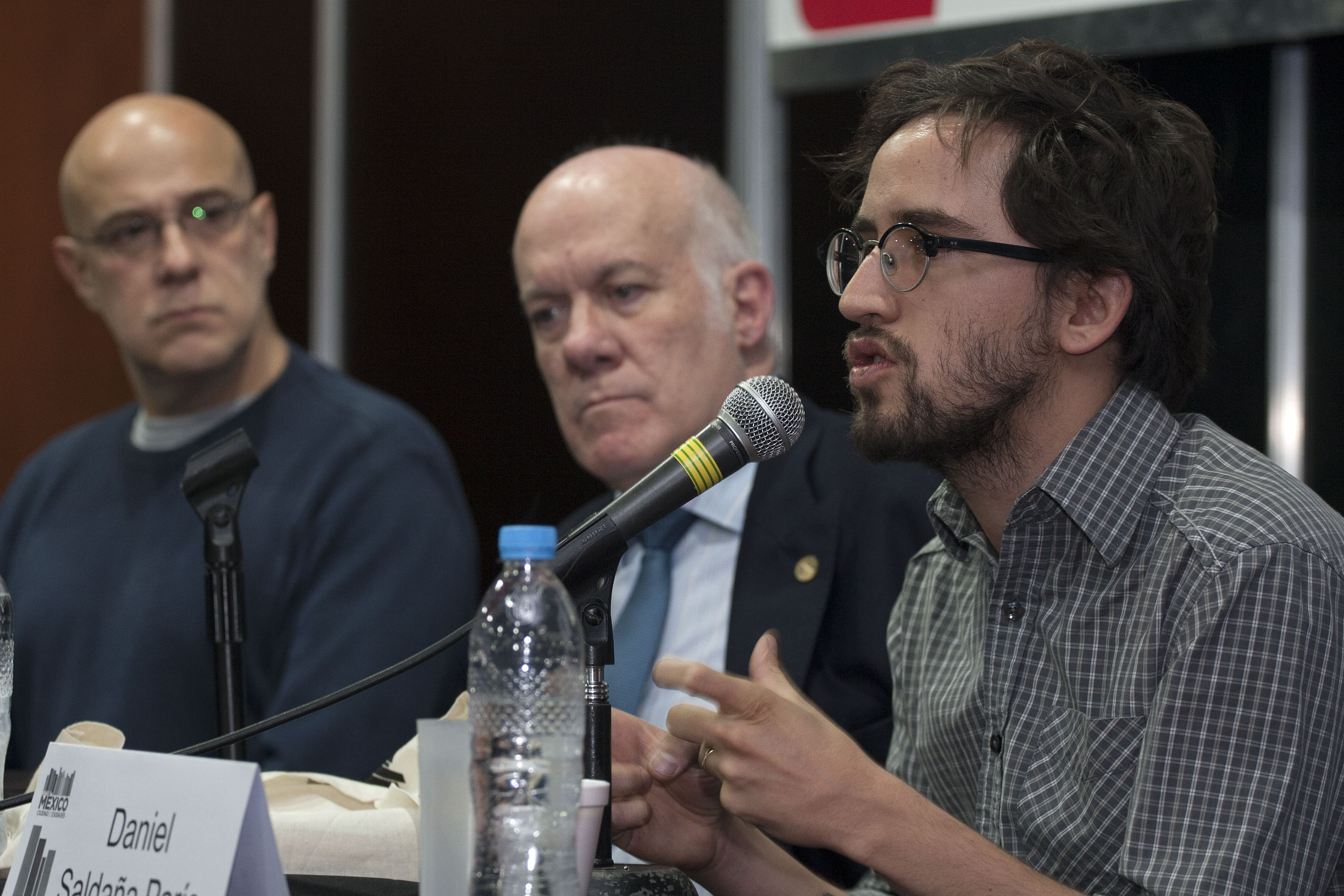
May 6, 2015. At the 41st Buenos Aires International Book Fair, the talk "Chilango and Lunfardo: The Language of the Streets" featuring Óscar Conde, José Luis Moure, and Daniel Saldaña París (right) at the Salón Alfonso Reyes del Yellow Pavilion of the FILBA. Photo: Antonio Nava / Secretary of Culture Mexico City

Daniel Saldaña París (born 1984) is a Mexican poet, essayist, and novelist. He is the author of four novels—Among Strange Victims, Ramifications, The Dance and the Wildfire, and My Father’s Names—and a collection of personal essays, Planes Flying Over a Monster.

== Career ==
Daniel Saldaña París gained acclaim for his debut novel En medio de extrañas víctimas (2013) and its follow-up El nervio principal (2018), published in English as Among Strange Victims (2016) and Ramifications (2020) by Charco Press and Coffee House Press.

He has also published volumes of poetry. In 2015, he was included in the anthology México20: New Voices, Old Traditions (Pushkin Press), celebrating the best young Mexican writers. In 2017, he was chosen as one of the Bogotá39, a selection of the best young Latin American writers under 40.

He is the recipient of fellowships and residencies from the Banff Center for the Arts, the Latin American Art Museum of Buenos Aires, Art Omi, and MacDowell, he has been awarded the Eccles Center & Hay Festival Writers Award in the U.K., and his latest novel was a finalist for the Herralde Prize in 2021.

From 2022-2023, he was a fellow at the Cullman Center for Writers and Scholars of the New York Public Library.

His essay collection, Planes Flying over a Monster, was published by Catapult in 2024. It was translated by Christina MacSweeney and Philip K. Zimmerman. The book was a finalist for the 2025 PEN Translation Prize.

He is a 2026 recipient of a Borchard Foundation Literary Fellowship.

== Personal life ==
As of 2024, he is married to the writer Catherine Lacey. The couple live in Mexico City.

== Partial bibliography ==
=== Novels ===
- Among Strange Victims. Coffee House Press. 2016. ISBN 9781566894302.
- Ramifications. Charco Press. 2020. ISBN 9781999368470.
- The Dance and the Wildfire: A Novel. Catapult. 2025. ISBN 9781646222452.

=== Nonfiction ===
- Planes Flying Over a Monster: Essays. Catapult. 2024. ISBN 9781646222315.

=== Short fiction ===
- "Rosaura at Dawn", 2024, The Yale Review
- "The Cascades", 2026, The Paris Review
