= Margarita García Robayo =

Colombian novelist and writer (born 1980)

- Born: 1980 (age 45–46); Cartagena, Colombia
- Occupations: Novelist and writer

Margarita García Robayo (born 1980) is a Colombian novelist and writer. She was born in Cartagena on the Caribbean coast. She has written several novels and short story collections as well as a book of autobiographical essays. Her book Cosas peores (Worse Things) won the Casa de las Américas Prize in 2014. Her work has been translated into English, French, Portuguese, Italian, Hebrew, and Chinese.

== Life and career ==
She was born in Cartagena, Colombia and attended a religious school. She was inspired to write by the novella Las batallas en el desierto and other works byJosé Emilio Pacheco.

García worked as the executive director of the Tomás Eloy Martínez Foundation between 2010 and 2014.

In 2014 she was awarded the Casa de las Américas Prize for her book Cosas peores (Worse Things), a collection of short stories.

In 2019, her book Primera persona was published. It's a compilation of stories and essays, first released in different magazines between 2011 and 2018.

In 2021, Alfaguara published El sonido de las olas, a compilation of 3 novels of her, previously released in different magazines: Hasta que pase un huracán (2012), Lo que no aprendí (2013), and Educación sexual, the latter printed as a serial in Portuguese in the Brazilian magazin Piauí in 2016.

Since 2005, she has lived in Buenos Aires, Argentina.

== Selected works ==
- Hay ciertas cosas que una no puede hacer descalza. Barcelona: Ediciones Destino, 2010
- Hasta que pase un huracán (Waiting for a hurricane), 2012
- Lo que no aprendí (The things I have not learnt). Buenos Aires: Planeta, 2013
- Cosas peores (Worse Things). Bogotá: Alfaguara, 2014
- Educación Sexual (Sexual education), 2016
- Tiempo muerto. Bogotá: Alfaguara, 2017
- Primera persona. Lima: Pesopluma, 2017
- La encomienda. Barcelona: Anagrama, 2022

=== Works in translation ===
- Fish Soup. Edinburgh: Charco Press, 2018. Translated by Charlotte Coombe. Includes Waiting for a Hurricane and Sexual Education
- Holiday Heart (Tiempo muerto). Edinburgh: Charco Press, 2020. Translated by Charlotte Coombe. Winner of the English PEN Award
- The Delivery, Edinburgh: Charco Press, 2023. Translated by Megan McDowell.
