= Living to Tell the Tale =

Autobiography of Gabriel García Márquez

- Author: Gabriel García Márquez
- Original title: Vivir para contarla
- Translator: Edith Grossman
- Language: Spanish
- Genre: Autobiography
- Publication date: 2002

Living to Tell the Tale (original Spanish language title: Vivir para contarla) is the first volume of the autobiography of Gabriel García Márquez.

The book was originally published in Spanish in 2002, with an English translation by Edith Grossman published in 2003.

Living to Tell the Tale tells the story of García Márquez's life from 1927 through 1950, ending with his proposal to his wife. It focuses heavily on García Márquez's family, schooling, and early career as a journalist and short story writer, and includes references to numerous real-life events that ended up in his novels in one form or another, including the Banana massacre that appears prominently in One Hundred Years of Solitude and the friend of his whose life and death were the model for Chronicle of a Death Foretold.

== Editions ==
- García Márquez, Gabriel (2004). Edith Grossman (ed.). Living to Tell the Tale. Vintage International. ISBN 1-4000-3454-X.
