= Julián Herbert =

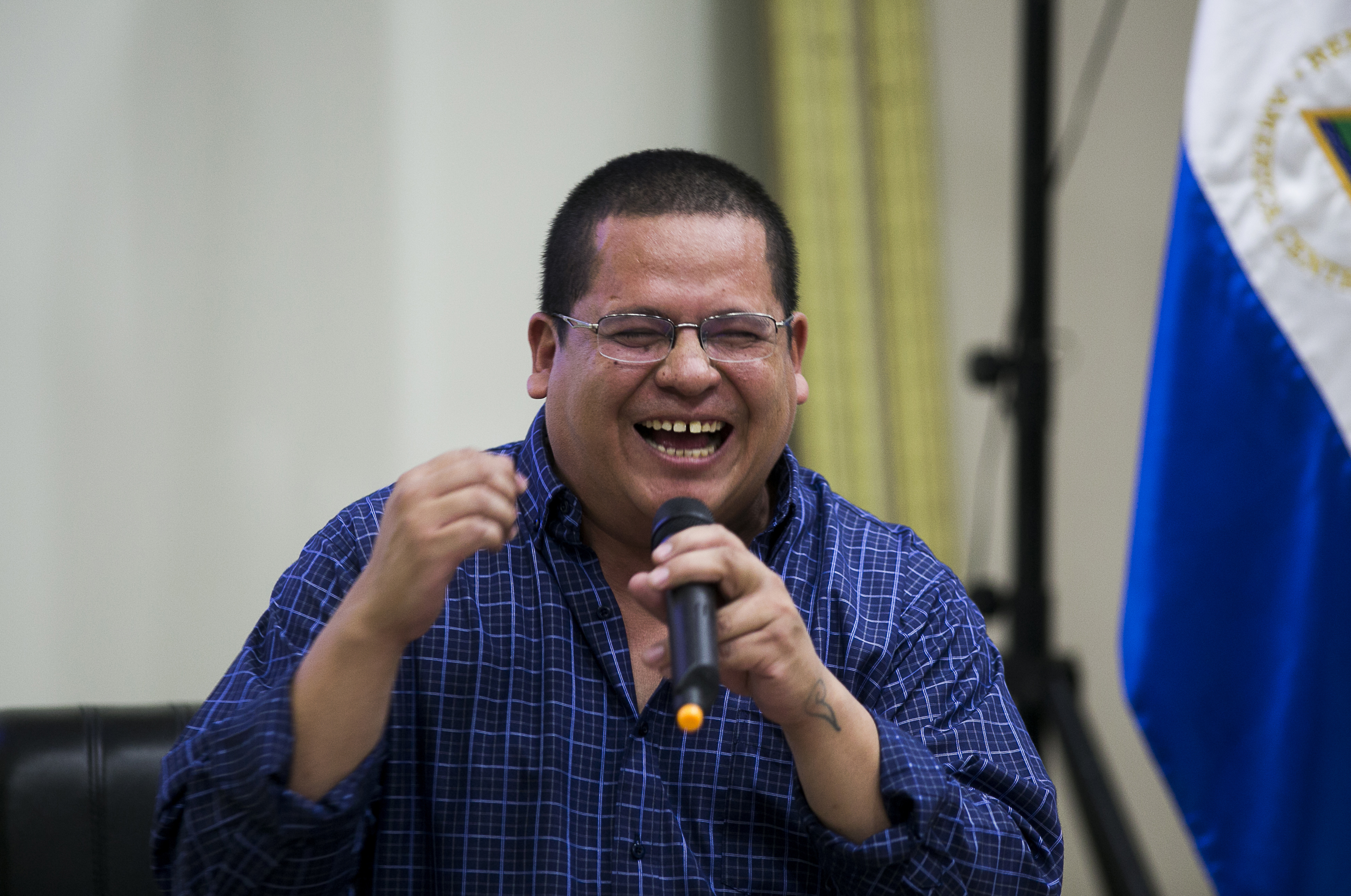
Picture of Julián Herbert

Julián Herbert (born 1971) is a Mexican writer. He was born in Acapulco, Mexico. He is the author of several books of poems, and has also published novels such as Un mundo infill, Tomb Song and the historical fiction La casa del dolor ajeno. His short story collections include Cocaína (manual del usuario) and Tráiganme la cabeza de Quentin Tarantino.

His work has won many prizes such as the Gilberto Owen National Literature Prize, the Juan José Arreola Prize and the Agustín Yáñez Prize for short fiction, the Jaén Novel Prize, and the Elena Poniatowska Ibero-American Novel Prize. His work has been translated into English, French, Portuguese, Italian, German, and Turkish.

He has worked as an advisor to the Seminario Amparán de Literatura. He is the vocalist of the folk rock group Los Tigres de Borges. He lives in Saltillo, Mexico.
