= Luis Sagasti =

Argentine writer and art critic (born 1963)

Luis Sagasti (born 1963) is an Argentine writer and art critic. He was born in Bahía Blanca and studied history at the Universidad Nacional del Sur where he now teaches. He worked for eight years as a curator at the Museum of Contemporary Art in Bahía Blanca. He published his first novel in 1999, and is best known for his 2011 novel Bellas Artes which was translated into English as Fireflies.

== Selected works ==
- El Canon de Leipzig (Ediciones Simurg, 1999) Leipzig's Canon
- Los mares de la Luna (Editorial Sudamericana, 2006) Seas of the Moon
- Bellas Artes (Eterna Cadencia, 2011) Fireflies
- Perdidos en el espacio: Un ensayo sobre el fin de la historia en la Argentina (Capital Intelectual, 2011) Lost in Space
- Maelstrom (Eterna Cadencia, 2015)
- El arte de la fuga (treintayseis, 2016)
- Una ofrenda musical (Eterna Cadencia, 2017) A Musical Offering
- Cybertlön (Tenemos las Máquinas, 2018)
- Por qué escuchamos a Led Zeppelin (Gourmet Musical, 2019)
- Leyden Ltd. (Eterna Cadencia, 2019)
