= Ricardo Romero (writer) =

Argentine writer and editor (born 1976)

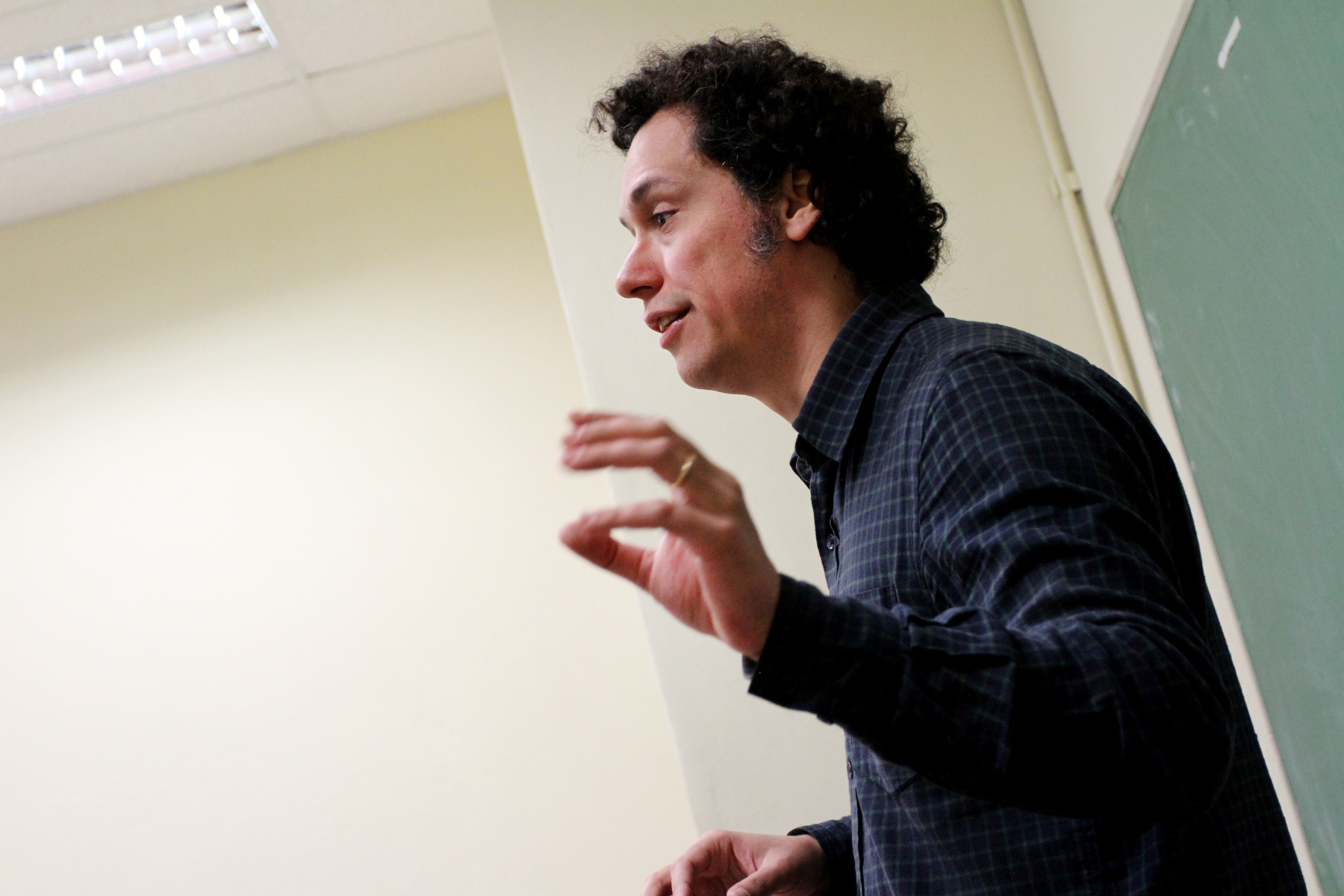
- Ricardo Romero guest lecturing at the University of Buenos Aires, 2015
- Born: 1976 (age 49–50); Paraná, Entre Ríos
- Education: Universidad Nacional de Córdoba
- Occupations: Writer; Editor
- Writing career
- Notable work: Ninguna parte
- Literary movement: El Quinteto de la Muerte

Ricardo Romero (born 1976) is an Argentine writer and editor. He was born in Paraná, Entre Ríos, and studied at the Universidad Nacional de Córdoba, where he majored in Modern Literature. Moving to Buenos Aires in 2002, he edited the literary magazine Oliverio from 2003 to 2006. From 2006 to 2010, he was a member of the writers' collective El Quinteto de la Muerte. Other members included Facundo Gorostiza, Federico Levín, Ignacio Molina, and Lucas "Funes" Olivera.

He works as an editor at Gárgola Ediciones, where he directs the collection Laura Palmer no ha muerto (Laura Palmer has not died), including works by Juan Sasturain, among others.

Romero's debut novel Ninguna parte appeared in 2003. He has since completed a trilogy of postapocalytpic novels - El síndrome de Rasputín (2008), Los bailarines del fin del mundo (2009), El spleen de los muertos (2012). His book The President's Room was published in English by Charco Press. In 2021, he published a new weird novel, Big Rip.

His work has been translated to English, French, Portuguese and Italian.
