= Susana Villalba =

Argentine poet (born 1956)

- Born: 12 April 1956 (age 70)
- Education: Escuela Metropolitana de Arte Dramático
- Occupations: Poet; playwright; journalist
- Writing career
- Notable awards: Guggenheim Fellowship (2011)

Susana Ada Villalba (born 12 April 1956) is an Argentine poet, playwright, and journalist. A 2011 Guggenheim Fellow, she has written several poetry volumes and plays, and has worked at Clarín's Revista Ñ as a theatre critic.

== Biography ==
Villalba was born on 12 April 1956 in Buenos Aires. She was educated at the Escuela Metropolitana de Arte Dramático, where she studied playwriting.

Villalba has published at least six poetry volumes: Oficiante de sombras (1982), Clínica de muñecas (1986), Susy, secretos del corazón (1989), Matar un animal (1995), Caminatas (1999), and Plegarias (2002). In 2011, she was awarded a Guggenheim Fellowship for her project to write the poetry book El animal humano, in which "the things that are not usually heard would speak." In 2018, she published another poetry volume, La bestia ser; Claudia Aboaf called this volume an example of poetry "reawaken[ing] to its essential place" in the late-2010s and early-2020s.

As a playwright, Villalba has written and directed numerous plays. Among them, La voz de la luz received an Honorable Mention from the National Endowment for the Arts. Another play she penned was an adaptation of the Gabriela Cabezón Cámara novel The Adventures of China Iron, directed by Hernán Márquez and performed at Dumont 4040 in September 2025.

In 1999, Villalba created the Casa de la poesía, a space in Buenos Aires and later a national one, with the aim of promoting this literary genre; the International Poetry Festival was held there for the first time. She has also served as director of the Casa de la Lectura and taught workshops at the University of Buenos Aires Faculty of Letters.

Villalba is also a theatre critic, at one point working at Clarín's Revista Ñ in that capacity. In 2011, a negative review she wrote of a performance of Mi vida después - accusing it of trivializing its subject matter of the country's past trauma - resulted in a public rebuke from one of its actors (whose father was assassinated in the National Reorganization Process) as well as an internal dispute within Lola Arias's troupe.
