= We Are Green and Trembling =

2023 novel by Gabriela Cabezón Cámara

- Original title: Las niñas del naranjel
- Translator: Robin Myers
- Publisher: Penguin Random House (Spanish), Harvill Secker (English)
- Publication date: 2023
- English publication date: 2025
- ISBN: 978-6073838122

We Are Green and Trembling (Spanish: Las niñas del naranjel, lit. 'The Girls from the Orange Grove') is a 2023 novel by Argentine writer Gabriela Cabezón Cámara. The novel is a reimagining of the life of Antonio de Erauso, a 17th-century explorer of the Americas who was born a woman but lived as a man. An English translation by Robin Myers was published in 2025. The novel has received positive reviews and several awards.

== Premise ==
15-year-old Catalina de Erauso escapes from the convent where she was a novice. She goes to America, going under the name Antonio and dressing as a man. After escaping the gallows, Antonio makes a promise to the Virgin of the Orange Grove (La Virgen del Naranjel) to tell his story to his aunt, the prioress, and to rescue two Guaraní girls, Michi and Mitãkuña, from enslavement at the hands of Spaniards.

== Reception ==
The novel received positive reviews upon release. Reviewers praised Cabezón's mixed use of Guarani, 16th-century Spanish and Basque in the novel. Cabezón's social and political commentary also attracted attention: One reviewer, comparing We Are Green and Trembling to Cabezón's previous work, The Adventures of China Iron, commented that both works critique colonialist values in favor of indigenous values; Brock Kingsley of the Chicago Review of Books praised the prose, social and political commentary of We Are Green And Trembling, calling the novel "profoundly resonant with our current moment". Isaac Zamet of the Financial Times criticized the lack of "forward motion of narrative", but felt that it was compensated by the "meditative lyricism" of the novel.

The novel was listed among the best books of 2023 by the Argentine online newspaper Infobae.

=== Accolades ===
- Winner of the Sor Juana Inés de la Cruz Prize, 2024
- Winner of the National Book Award for Translated Literature, 2025
- Longlisted for the International Booker Prize, 2026
- Nominated for the Dublin Literary Award, 2026
- Longlisted for the Warwick Prize for Women in Translation, 2026
