= Romance de la negra rubia =

2014 Argentine novella

- Author: Gabriela Cabezón Cámara
- Language: Spanish
- Genre: Novella
- Publisher: Eterna Cadencia
- Publication date: 2014
- Publication place: Argentina
- ISBN: 9789877120226
- Preceded by: Le viste la cara a Dios
- Website: Romance de la negra rubia

Romance de la negra rubia (Note: English: Negra, lit. a black woman; but in the popular parlance of Argentina, it is used to refer to a woman of humble origins; it can also be used as a term of endearment.) (Note: English: Rubia, lit. a blonde woman.) is a 2014 novella by Argentine writer Gabriela Cabezón Cámara, published by Eterna Cadencia. It follows the story of a poet who sets herself on fire to avoid being evicted from a building by the police, an act that makes her famous and allows her to help her community and then launch an international tour as a performance artist.

Through parody and irony, the novella explores themes such as power relations, political demagoguery, and traditional ideas of romantic love. It also addresses popular religiosity as a transgressive force in society and the value given to sacrifices and the dead as a bargaining chip to obtain favors or benefits from groups in power.

According to Cabezón Cámara, the book is part of a sort of "dark trilogy" along with her two previous works: La Virgen Cabeza (2009) and Le viste la cara a Dios (2011). The idea of referring to her work as a "dark trilogy" was suggested by the author herself and then picked up in various interviews and reviews.

== Plot ==
Gabi is a poet in a commune of artists who live in a building as okupas (squatters). When the police try to evict them, she decides to set fire to herself as a form of resistance, an event that is captured by television cameras. Gabi manages to survive the burns and becomes a popular heroine. At first, she is used as a symbol by political groups, but she later learns to use her power with the media to obtain benefits for her community.

She soon launches an international tour as a performance artist, in which her disfigured body is the main attraction. She arrives at the Venice Biennale, where she meets Elena, a Swiss millionaire who buys the installation in which Gabi was traveling and who begins a love affair with her. Some time later, Elena dies due to an illness and leaves Gabi the skin of her face so that she can transplant it onto hers. Thanks to the power she has gained, Gabi manages to gift her former housemates with houses of their own and she is later elected governor of Buenos Aires Province. Once her term ends, she decides to retire and lead a quiet life in the city of Tigre, where she writes this story and lives with two European men in a polyamorous relationship.

== Main characters ==
- Gabi: she is the protagonist of the story and the negra rubia of the title. According to Montes, the character embodies the social construct of a powerful, lower-class woman who gives her life for her people, not unlike Eva Perón, a negra rubia just like her. Montes adds that comparisons can also be drawn between the narrator and the stories surrounding Argentine political leader Milagro Sala and Cristina Fernández de Kirchner, the former president of Argentina. In this sense, being negra implies having working-class origins, while becoming rubia is to gain political power.
  Gabi is a poet who sets herself alight to avoid being evicted from a building she had arrived at because there were people there offering whiskey and cocaine. Due to the severity of the burns, she spends a year in the hospital. Upon her release, she becomes a leader in her community and starts to gain favors for herself in negotiations with the authorities. Gabi is constantly observing the events that surround her from a cynical point of view with which she identifies the hypocrisy of the people with whom she interacts, although, at the same time, she gets carried away by circumstances with a passive attitude, summed up by the phrase da igual, nada tiene sentido (Note: English: It's all the same, nothing makes sense.) Among the characters to whom she is compared in the novel due to either her physical appearance or the power she achieves are: Darth Vader, Eva Perón, and Marina Abramović. In an interview, Cabezón Cámara described Gabi's character as follows:

Es una especie de descerebrada, está pasada de rosca, reloca y va aprendiendo cómo construir poder político para beneficiar a su comuna y a sí misma con el tiempo. (Note: English: She is sort of foolish, has a screw loose, is raving mad, and, over time, she gradually learns how to build political power in order to benefit her commune and herself.)

- Elena: she is an art collector, originally from Switzerland, who buys the art installation in which Gabi was participating and who becomes her lover. When she dies of cancer, she leaves part of her fortune to Gabi along with her face, so she can have it transplanted onto her own face. Gabi falls in love with her por alta, por rubia, por musculosa, por llevar la ropa de lino con elegancia (Note: English: Because she is tall, blonde, brawny, and she wears linen clothes with elegance) and describes her as a woman who is ligera y fuerte. (Note: English: Light but strong)

== Composition ==
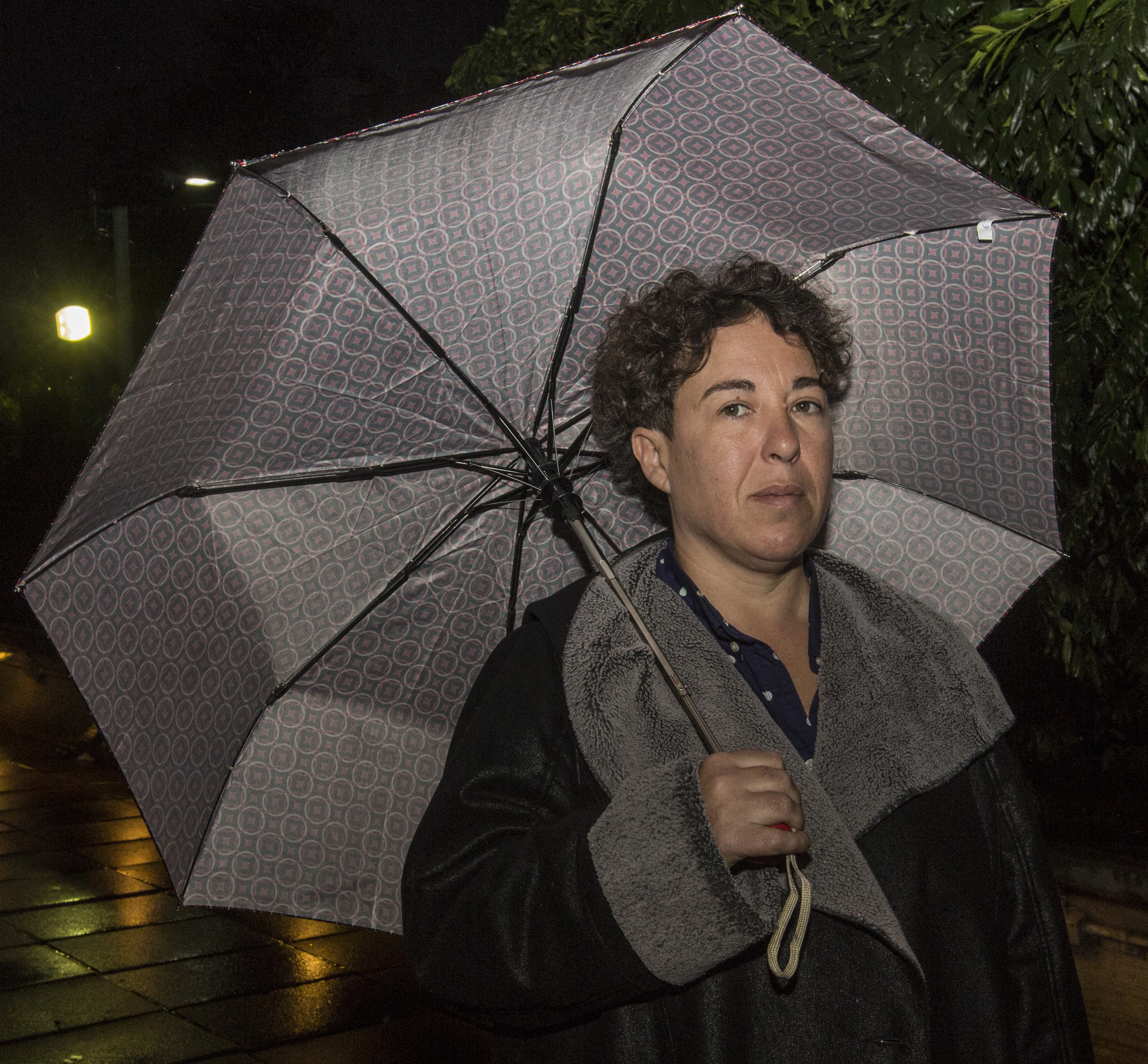
Gabriela Cabezón Cámara in 2016

The original idea for the book was born in February 2002, when Cabezón Cámara read a press article published in Argentine newspaper Clarín in the context of the December 2001 riots in Argentina. The article included a photograph of a man who had set himself on fire. The man's name was Rubén Arias and he was a 31-year-old newspaper delivery man, a resident of Neuquén, who had threatened to set himself alight if the police tried to evict him from the subsidized housing in which he lived. The police had dismissed his threat, and so Arias set fire to himself and caused everyone around him to flee, a moment that was captured in the photograph.

Arias remained hospitalized for about 15 days before dying. This incident sparked clashes between the police and the remaining people who were evicted, but days later the local authorities decided to provide them with housing on the condition that couples living together had to get married. This piqued Cabezón Cámara's curiosity and made her think that Arias's death had served as a sort of sacrifice that had been accepted by the authorities in Neuquén to provide those evicted with houses, in the style of the Greek gods.

This idea was one of the two that Cabezón Cámara later submitted to Diana Bellessi, who suggested that she first work on the one that would become La Virgen Cabeza, published in 2009 by Eterna Cadencia. Years later, Cabezón Cámara took up again the idea for Romance de la negra rubia and wrote a first version of the novella, narrated in the third person, which she ended up discarding as she considered that the prose she used was too rough and violent. The second version of the manuscript was the one that eventually became the final version of the book.

The novella is written in the first person and is made up of brief chapters of no more than three pages each. It also has an epilogue and a coda.

== Central themes ==
=== The social role of sacrifice ===
One of the central themes of the book is the social role of sacrifice as a record of the struggle in favor of communities, although it also criticizes the negative impact it has had throughout history and its exploitation by political actors. At the beginning, Gabi's sacrificio fundante (Note: English: Foundational sacrifice) serves as the primordial act that creates her community's shared identity and provides them with a sense of belonging. The sense of nosotros (Note: English: Us) that they had managed until then becomes a nuestro (Note: English: Ours) in relation to the community ownership of the building in which they live. This social movement created around the figure of Gabi also allows her to gain political power and thus pressure the judge who had previously evicted them into providing them all with the title deeds of the building.

However, Gabi observes with skepticism the meaning of her own sacrifice and realizes that it has been appropriated by groups in power as a way to increase their political capital. She specifically calls out the Justicialist Party as one of the sectors attempting to take advantage of her condition of being medio muerta (Note: English: Half-dead) in a similar manner as had been done with the victims of forced disappearance during the military dictatorship in Argentina, whose memory is identified by Gabi as one of the foundations of the political power of Peronism:

Me usaba bastante el juez y quiso usarme el Pejota para sumarme a la masa, nunca yerta ni acabada, de su mayor capital: el plantel de muertos vivos. (Note: English: The judge used me a lot, and the Pejota wanted to use me so as to add me to the mass, never stiff nor finished, of its greatest capital: the herd of the living dead.) (Note: Pejota is the initialism formed by the first two letters of the Justicialist Party, or Partido Justicialista in Spanish)

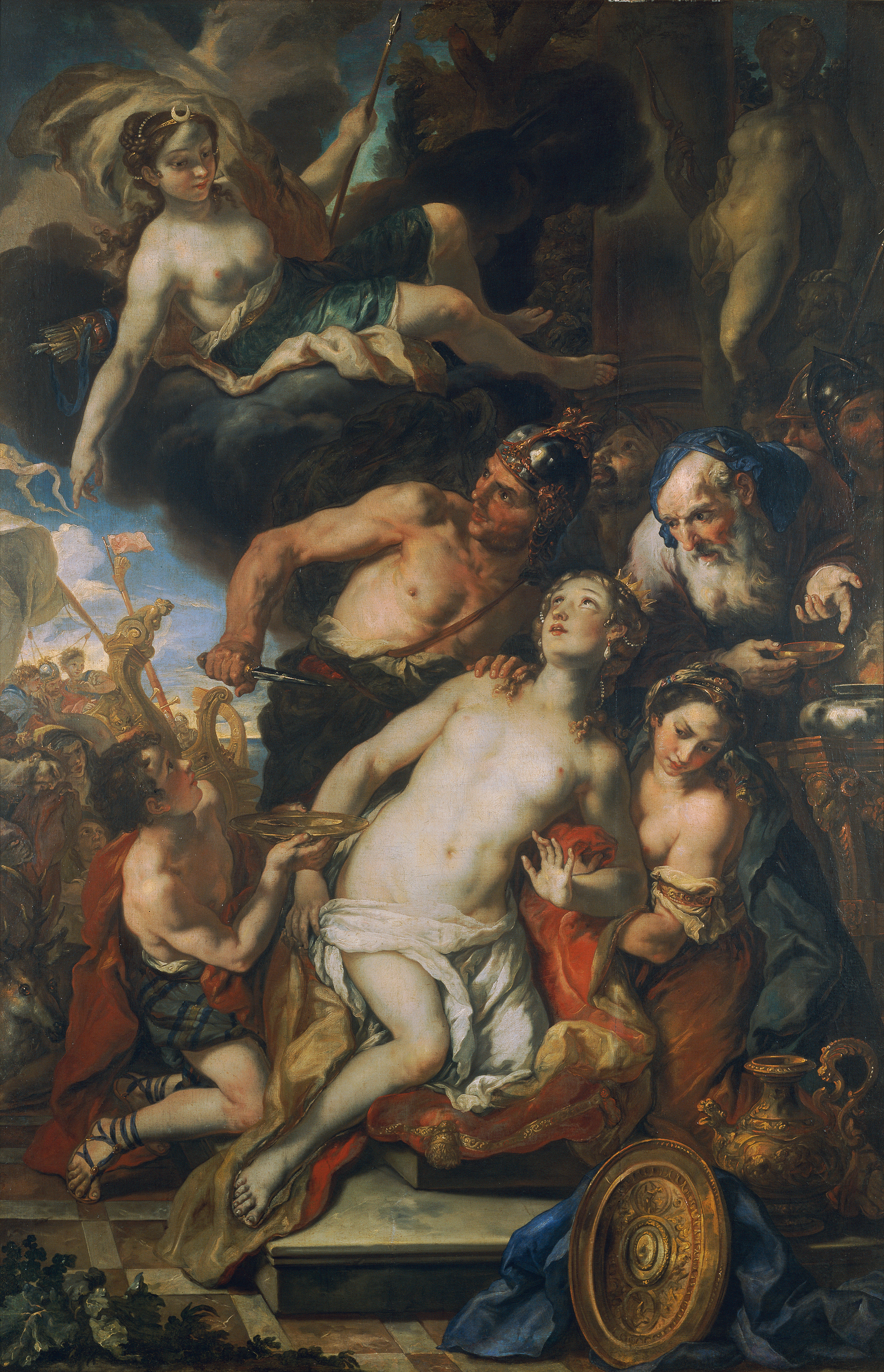
The Sacrifice of Iphigenia, an oil painting by Johann Michael Rottmayr

Moreover, Cabezón Cámara analyzes Gabi's situation and makes a historical overview in which she identifies the symbolic power of sacrifices to bring benefits to the community to which the sacrificed party belongs. Among the examples she mentions are the sacrifice of Iphigenia at the hands of her father Agamemnon to secure the blessing from the gods, the birth of agriculture after Cain killed Abel, and even the Holocaust which, among its immediate effects, led to the creation of Israel. In short, the author identifies a sort of general law in which the dead have been used throughout history as a bargaining chip to obtain benefits for their respective communities. And even more than that, Cabezón Cámara claims that the people who have been tortured the most they themselves later victimize others under the pretext of the exchange value in the number of dead they have accumulated. As some examples, she mentions the abuses perpetrated by the Israel Defense Forces in Palestine and the crucifixion of Jesus, which centuries later would wreak havoc through the evangelism that took place during the Spanish colonization of the Americas. The author asks herself the question ¿Llama la herencia del mártir al martirio de los otros? (Note: English: Does the martyr's legacy call for the martyrdom of others?) regarding this point.

The novella also points out that these foundational sacrifices have served to normalize pernicious aspects of present-day societies. In the case of the sacrifice of Iphigenia, Agamemnon's victory legitimizes the gender violence she is subjected to, and grants men a symbolic right over the lives of their wives and daughters. The fact that Iphigenia was burned alive does not go unnoticed in Cabezón Cámara's writing, as she makes a reference to it in the case of Gabi herself and in the case of the women murdered in Argentina by burning.

=== Popular religiosity ===
Religion is another major theme in the book, especially the concept of popular sainthood. Throughout the novella, Gabi takes on the role of martyr, and her self-immolation is repeatedly described using religious terms, such as mito del origen (Note: English: Origin myth) and sacrificio fundante. (Note: English: Foundational sacrifice) The second chapter, which is precisely titled Cómo me hice santa, (Note: English: How I became a saint) narrates the exact moment in which Gabi's sacrifice becomes the symbol of struggle for her community. The fact that all of the building's inhabitants manage to be given housing after the sacrifice is later considered a miracle, while Gabi's screams at the police telling them they would never enter the building are interpreted as a prophecy that is fulfilled when they are killed due to their own criminal actions.

The establishment of Gabi as a popular saint allows her to turn into an opposing force to political power by positioning herself, first, as a defender of the community of bohemian artists, and later, of the dispossessed classes that take part in the squatter movement, even if that was never her original goal. This concept of a transgressive popular religiosity is a recurring theme in Cabezón Cámara's narrative, also present in her previous works: La Virgen Cabeza (2009) and Le viste la cara a Dios (2011).

The author also criticizes several aspects of traditional religious institutions, including hierarchical structures and power relations where los de arriba (Note: English: The people at the top) (referring to the upper classes) are los que están cerca del cielo, (Note: English: The ones close to Heaven) los más cercanos a Dios. (Note: English: The ones closest to God) When Gabi starts to be considered a saint, she herself is elevated by her followers and goes on to live in the top floor of the building, from where she rarely comes down and from where she can talk with powerful people as an equal. The novella also suggests that the religious idea of the sagrado (Note: English: Sacred) is intrinsically linked to these power relations and the need for sacrifice, by claiming that [lo] que lleva de Cristo al Vaticano (Note: English: What leads from Christ to the Vatican) are los muertos que llevamos en la espalda. (Note: English: The dead we carry on our backs)

=== Romantic love and sexism ===
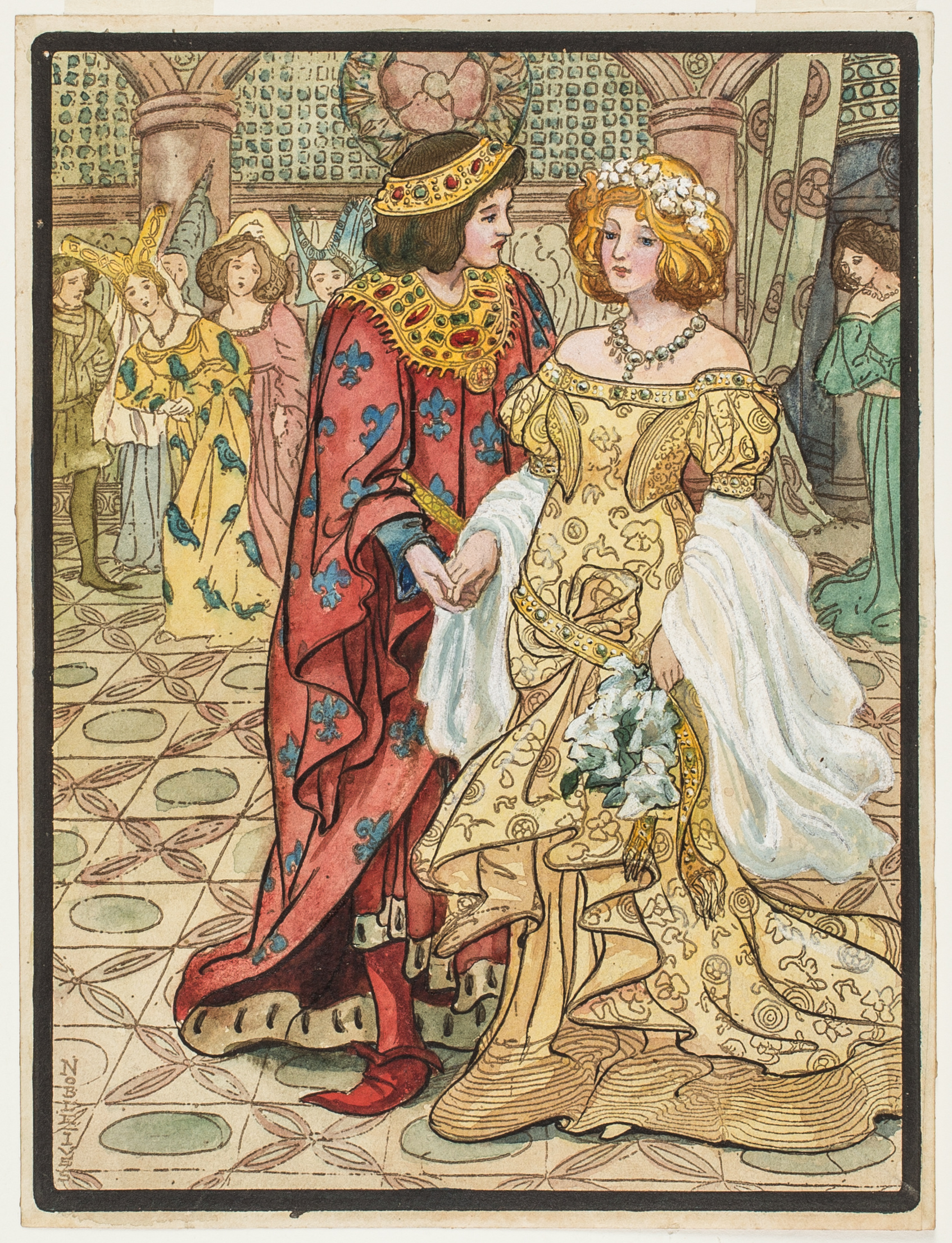
Cabezón Cámara creates a parody of romantic love traits in stories such as Cinderella.

The love affair between Gabi and Elena is constantly depicted in the novella in terms of a parody. From the moment they meet, and Gabi is lovestruck by Elena, her attraction is described with irony, such as when she says that what has happened to her is exactly what happens lo que a tanto negro, (Note: English: To every working-class person) that is, falling in love with Elena's features that are specific to her condition as a white, wealthy European woman. Once they begin their relationship, they live for a few months in Venice, which Gabi describes as having come out of romantic postales, (Note: English: Postcards) in which she stresses the luxury and money that Elena surrounds her with, referring to her as her princesa. (Note: English: Princess) According to Professor Agnieszka Flisek, Gabi's relationship draws a queer analogue to the classic fairy tale of Cinderella, in which a lower-class woman falls in love with a wealthy prince who fits the social standards of what is considered attractive.

Moreover, the scene in which they meet is narrated using terms inspired by telenovelas, with exaggerated references to atardeceres, (Note: English: Sunsets) poema rosa, (Note: English: Romantic poems) and the expectation built by capítulos y capítulos (Note: English: Chapters and chapters) towards what would eventually be an intercambio de fluidos. (Note: English: Exchange of fluids) The melodramatic nature of the story is emphasized when Elena reveals to her that she will die soon of her illness. Faced with Gabi's exaggerated reaction, it is Elena herself who reprimands her:

"Cáncer", me dijo, "no se cura". Y yo que en asado había mutado muté en mujer de Lot (...) me desmoroné y mientras caía hice mierda medio pabellón argentino: ahí sí me desplomé, caí en picada, me rompí. Elena miró, quieta, callada hasta que terminé de caer y me dijo que me deje de joder con exuberancias de latina pelotuda. (Note: English: "Cancer," she told me, "is incurable." And I, who had turned into roasted meat, turned into Lot's wife (…) I crumbled and, while I fell, I destroyed half of the Argentine Pavilion; that's where I collapsed, I plummeted, I broke. Elena looked on, stood still, quiet, until I had reached the ground, and told me to quit being an annoying, Latina drama queen.)

The author parodies the romantic idea of soulmates to the extreme in light of Elena's illness, when she offers to give Gabi her face to transplant it onto her own once she is dead, so they can be together forever.

According to Agnieszka Flisek, the parody made by Cabezón Cámara about the idea of romantic love criticizes its aspect as a cultural construct based on the oppression of women. In several passages, Gabi describes Elena using masculine or military terms, such as tigre, (Note: English: Tiger) Napoleona, and tanque ultraliviano. (Note: English: Ultralight tank) The author also draws a parallel between the dominance Elena exerts over Gabi, due to the power she has, and the act of penetration, such as when Gabi describes Elena as un misil que atraviesa la atmósfera (Note: English: A missile piercing the atmosphere) or when she recalls their first kiss with the phrase Me entró en la boca como le entraba a todo, como si fuera la dueña. (Note: English: She entered my mouth as she entered everything: as if she owned it)

Gabi's own transformation into a subject with political power also highlights the phallogocentric nature of Latin American societies, by claiming that power had made her grow como una pija, (Note: English: Like a cock) a metaphor of sexism in systems that believe only men can fulfill roles in the political sphere. Likewise, the author again compares dominance through power with the active role in a sexual relationship by having Gabi say Me cogí a medio país (Note: English: I fucked half the country) and describing her power as tremenda envergadura envidia de mucho macho. (Note: English: [Of] enormous magnitude, the envy of many men)

== Reception ==
Romance de la negra rubia was well received by critics. Author Nora Domínguez, in a review published by Argentine newspaper Clarín, referred positively to the novella, which she described as [una] apuesta barroca, fundamentalmente irónica, (Note: English: An elaborate, fundamentally ironic wager) and highlighted its exploration of political power and social resistance. On the other hand, the review by magazine Otra Parte praised the author's style, especially the moments of fuerte tempo poético (Note: English: Strong poetic tempo) and its tono de locuacidad barriobajera. (Note: English: Tone of working-class loquaciousness) Walter Lezcano, from newspaper Página 12, also praised this aspect, referring to the author's narration style as lúdica, humorística y despiadada, (Note: English: Playful, humorous, and ruthless) highlighting the mixture of colloquial and academic language, apart from the constant use of irony.

Professor Natalia Brizuela was equally praising of the novella, referring to it as [una] perla irregular, opaca, con esa inevitable opacidad que va construyendo el pliegue, como en los mejores versos de Góngora. (Note: English: An irregular, opaque pearl, with that unavoidable opacity that gradually creates the fold, as in the best verses by Góngora) She particularly mentioned the baroque nature of the narrative and the complex transformation of the protagonist, apart from claiming that the work confirmed the idea that Cabezón Cámara's writing es revolucionaria, es emancipadora, es radical. (Note: English: Is revolutionary, is emancipatory, is radical)

== See also ==
- Le viste la cara a Dios
- Gabriela Cabezón Cámara

== Bibliography ==
- Brizuela, Natalia (2019). Introduction ( (PDF)). Romance de la negra rubia. By Cabezón Cámara, Gabriela (in Spanish) (1st. ed.). Buenos Aires: Editorial La Página S.A. ISBN 978-987-503-724-3. Archived from the original on 20 October 2020. "Text read for the launch of this novella in the edition by Eterna Cadencia, Buenos Aires, 13 March 2014"
- Flisek, Agnieszka; Moszczynska-Dürst, Katarzyna (2020). "Romance de la Negra Rubia de Gabriela Cabezón Cámara: entre la autobiografía tránsfuga y el autorretrato de un sujeto cínico" (PDF). Itinerarios: Revista de estudios lingüísticos, literarios, históricos y antropológicos (in Spanish). 32. Warsaw, Poland: Institute of Iberian and Ibero-American Studies, University of Warsaw: 41–58. ISSN 1507-7241.
- Graná, Leonardo (1 December 2020). Pérez Gras, María Laura (ed.). "Santidad y Numinosidad en Romance de la Negra Rubia, de Gabriela Cabezón Cámara" (PDF). Gramma (in Spanish). 31, Anejo:Las mil Máscaras del Héroe. Transfiguraciones del Mito en la Literatura Argentina Contemporánea (8). Buenos Aires, Argentina: Universidad del Salvador. ISSN 1850-0161.
- Montes, Alicia (10 September 2018). "Genealogía del sacrificio: cuerpo y memoria en Romance de la negra rubia de Gabriela Cabezón Cámara" (PDF). Debate Feminista (in Spanish). 56. Mexico: National Autonomous University of Mexico: 26–42. doi:10.22201/cieg.2594066xe.2018.56.02. ISSN 0188-9478.
- Sánchez, Silvina (2016). "Devenir monstruo. Sobre Romance de la negra rubia de Gabriela Cabezón Cámara". In Domínguez, Nora (ed.). Figuras y saberes de lo monstruoso (in Spanish). Buenos Aires, Argentina: University of Buenos Aires. pp. 149–161. ISBN 978-987-4019-01-1.
- Sotomayor Miletti, Áurea María (19 October 2020). "Cuando los lugares dirimidos hablan: precariedad en la obra de Carmen Berenguer, Gabriela Cabezón Cámara, Diamela Eltit y Samanta Schweblin". Kipus: Revista Andina de Letras y Estudios Culturales (in Spanish). July–December 2020 (48). Quito, Ecuador: Simón Bolívar Andean University: 47–64. doi:10.32719/13900102.2020.48.4. hdl:10644/7713. ISSN 1390-0102.

== Additional bibliography ==
- Domínguez, Nora (2018). "Entre lo singular y lo colectivo" (PDF). CELEHIS–Revista del Centro de Letras Hispanoamericanas (in Spanish). 27 (36). Mar del Plata, Argentina: National University of Mar del Plata: 35–45. ISSN 2313-9463.
- Maradei, Guadalupe (2018). "Ficciones posdictadura: la trilogía oscura de Gabriela Cabezón Cámara". In Ingenschay, Dieter (ed.). Eventos del deseo: sexualidades minoritarias en las culturas/literaturas de España y Latinoamérica a finales del siglo XX (in Spanish). Madrid-Frankfurt: Iberoamericana-Veuvert. pp. 123–140. ISBN 978-84-16922-71-0.
- Ríos, Marina (March 2015). "Literatura, cuerpo y performance en Romance de la Negra Rubia de Gabriela Cabezón Cámara" (PDF). 27th Conference of Researchers of the Institute of Hispanic American Literature (in Spanish). Buenos Aires, Argentina: University of Buenos Aires.
- Tozzi, Liliana (June 2019). "Poéticas de lo monstruoso. Romance de la negra rubia de Gabriela Cabezón Cámara". In Arán, Pampa Olga (ed.). Seminario de Verano IV. La pregunta por lo humano. Hombres/Dioses/Monstruos/Robots (in Spanish). Córdoba, Argentina: National University of Córdoba. pp. 129–148. ISBN 978-987-1742-86-8.
