= Gabriela Cabezón Cámara =

Argentine writer (b. 1968)

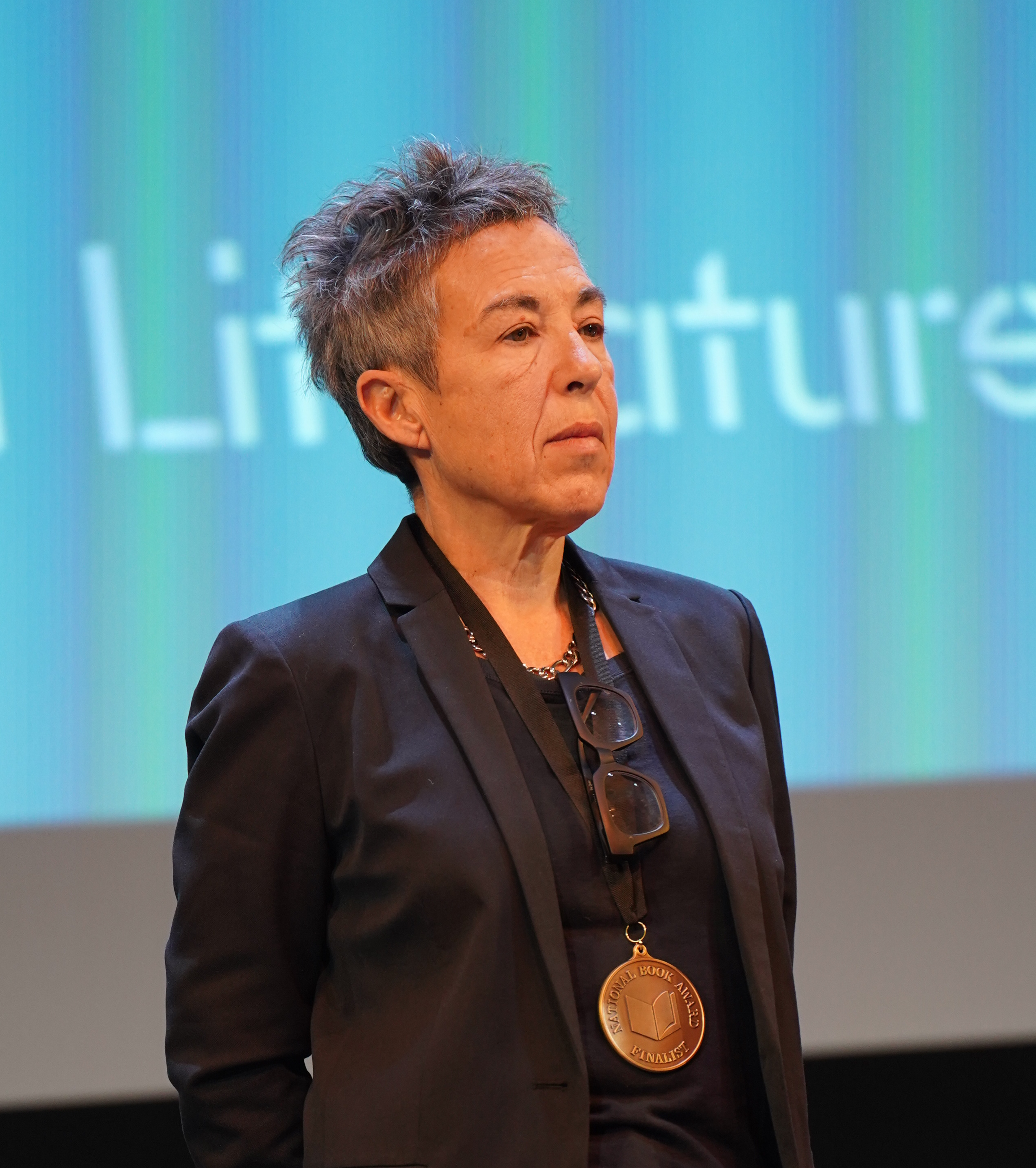
- Gabriela Cabezón Cámara at the 2025 National Book Awards reading
- Born: November 4, 1968 (age 57); San Isidro, Buenos Aires
- Education: University of Buenos Aires
- Occupations: Writer and journalist
- Writing career
- Language: Spanish
- Genres: Novel, Novella, Graphic novel
- Notable work: La Virgen Cabeza
- Notable awards: Silverio Cañada Memorial Prize, shortlisted (2009); International Booker Prize, shortlisted (2020); Ciutat de Barcelona Award in Spanish-language literature (2023)
- Movement: Nueva Narrativa Argentina

Gabriela Cabezón Cámara (San Isidro, Buenos Aires, 4 November 1968) is an Argentine writer and journalist. She is considered one of the most prominent figures in contemporary Argentine and Latin American literature, apart from being a well-known intellectual, and a feminist and environmentalist.

She has published three novels, but is best known for her debut with La Virgen Cabeza (2009), which gained her literary recognition and laid the foundations of her style. It was translated into English by Frances Riddle as Slum Virgin and published by Charco Press. This translated version was shortlisted for the Silverio Cañada Memorial Prize at the Gijón Noir Week in Spain and chosen as book of the year by Rolling Stone magazine in Argentina in 2009.

Her other two novels are: The Adventures of China Iron (2017), which interpreted Gaucho literature from a feminist and queer point of view and was shortlisted for the 2020 International Booker Prize, and Las niñas del naranjel (2023), about the historical figure of Monja Alférez and the Conquest of the Americas, which obtained the Ciutat de Barcelona award in Spanish-language literature and was also longlisted for the 2026 International Booker Prize under the title We Are Green and Trembling.

Her articles have been published in various media outlets, such as Soy, Anfibia, Le Monde diplomatique, and Revista Ñ. She also worked as the editor of the Culture section of Argentine newspaper Clarín. She is currently the head of the chair of the CINO Writing Workshop of the Creative Writing Course at the National University of the Arts. One of her students is Argentine writer and journalist Belén López Peiró, who writes about her experiences with child sexual abuse.

Furthermore, she received a scholarship as a writer-in-residence at UC Berkeley in 2014. She is a co-founder of the feminist movement Ni una menos. (Note: English: Not One Less)

== Early life and education ==
Gabriela Cabezón Cámara was born on 4 November 1968 in San Isidro, Buenos Aires Province, Argentina. She studied Humanities at the University of Buenos Aires.

== Literary career ==
One of her first stories, La hermana Cleopatra (the first draft of what would become her first novel, La Virgen Cabeza), appeared in 2006 in the anthology Una terraza propia, from publishing company Norma.

In 2011, she published the novella Le viste la cara a Dios, about human trafficking, which became the first Spanish-language e-book to be chosen as the book of the year by Revista Ñ.

In 2009, publishing house Eterna Cadencia published Cabezón Cámara's first novel, La Virgen Cabeza. The book was a rousing success with critics and the reading public alike. In 2013, she was awarded a scholarship as a writer-in-residence at UC Berkeley. That same year, she published the graphic novel Beya (Le viste la cara a Dios), based on her short story of the same name and with illustrations by Iñaki Echeverría. It received a distinction from the Argentine Senate and the Buenos Aires City Legislature for its impact on society. In 2014, she published her second novella, Romance de la negra rubia, the last one in the "dark trilogy" (along with La Virgen Cabeza and Le viste la cara a Dios), as referred to by critics.

She published her second novel, Las aventuras de la China Iron, in 2017. Critics referred to it as having una prosa encantada y casi milagrosa, (Note: English: An enchanted, almost miraculous prose) referring to it as otra fundación (Note: English: Another foundation) of Argentine literature. Moreover, the novel was chosen as one of the books of the year by the Spanish-language edition of The New York Times and by newspaper El País. Both Iona Macintyre and Fiona Mackintosh worked on its translation into English, which was published with the title The Adventures of China Iron by Charco Press. That translation was shortlisted for the International Booker Prize in 2020. The jury for the award considered it a maravillosa reelaboración feminista y queer de un mito fundacional americano (…) con un lenguaje y una perspectiva tan frescos que cambian 180 grados la idea de lo que una nueva nación americana podría ser. (Note: English: Wonderful feminist and queer retelling of an American foundational myth (…) with a language and a perspective that are so fresh, they make the idea of what a new American nation could be do a 180-degree turn) Its film adaptation was announced that very same year. In 2022, the book was one of the five finalists for the Prix Montluc Resistance et Liberté award.

In 2023, she published her third novel, Las niñas del naranjel, about the historical figure of Monja Alférez, who was born a woman in Spain in 1592 and later, living as a man, took part in the Conquest of the Americas. In January 2024, she obtained the Ciutat de Barcelona award in Spanish-language Literature for this book. In 2026, We Are Green and Trembling, Robin Myers's English translation of this novel, was longlisted for the International Booker Prize.

== Style ==
Cabezón Cámara's fictional worlds are inhabited by slum-dwellers, human trafficking victims, and okupas. Her literary plots are highly dynamic, and her narrators build their discourse outside the identity principle of unity. Thus, the characters change, both by contingency and by choice, and in an instant, they transform the definitive sign of their lives. Her novels are set in recognizable and violent places, and the main source and trigger of the story are news events and the crime genre.

Her protagonists include a trans woman who is a religious fanatic, a reporter on the police beat, and a victim of human trafficking for sexual exploitation. Due to the mix of characters, social classes, and sexual identities, her literature is considered part of the queer genre. Her narrative style blends content from reality (from slums to social networks) with expressions of classic literature, the gaucho genre, slang, and a touch of black humor.

One of Cabezón Cámara's concerns when it comes to the suffering of others is what happens to women as objects of prostitution, which she describes as ser violada las 24 horas. (Note: English: Being raped 24 hours a day) The main character of her novel La Virgen Cabeza goes to live in a slum where she finds love. On the other hand, it is worth noting that the reference to the Virgen (Note: English: Virgin) is a vindication of the place of women, since the Church only legitimizes this image as a wife, mother, and defender of sus maridos: Dios, el papa, y el Espíritu Santo. (Note: English: Her husbands: God, the Pope, and the Holy Ghost) Consequently, we can say that her work questions the various social classes and the images which sustain the patriarchal culture. Also, that through her writings, she blends egalitarian relationships in public spheres and, later, their dissolution.

=== Influences ===
Among the main influences that defined her vocation and her style, Cabezón Cámara has mentioned Patricia Highsmith, Rodolfo Walsh, Néstor Perlongher, and Osvaldo Lamborghini.

== Personal life ==
On 7 March (Lesbian Visibility Day in Argentina) 2025, she announced her engagement to comic artist Maitena.

== List of works ==
=== Novels ===
- La Virgen Cabeza (Eterna Cadencia, 2009) (published in English as Slum Virgin by Charco Press, 2017)
- Romance de la negra rubia (Eterna Cadencia, 2014)
- Las aventuras de la China Iron (Penguin Random House, 2017) (published in English as The Adventures of China Iron by Charco Press, 2019)
- Las niñas del naranjel (Penguin Random House, 2023) (published in English as We Are Green and Trembling by New Directions Press, 2025)

=== Short fiction ===
- Le viste la cara a Dios (novella, Eterna Cadencia, 2011)
- Beya: Le viste la cara a Dios (graphic novel, illustrated by Iñaki Echeverría, Eterna Cadencia, 2013)

== Bibliography ==
- Domínguez, Nora (2014). "Conversaciones y reenvíos con Gabriela Cabezón Cámara". Cuadernos LIRICO (in Spanish). 2014 (10. El XIX en el XX). doi:10.4000/lirico.1653. ISSN 2263-2158.
- Fernández, Nancy (2018). "Violencia, política y escritura. Gabriela Cabezón Cámara". Mora (in Spanish). 2018 (24). University of Buenos Aires: 111–120. doi:10.34096/mora.n24.6306. hdl:11336/178297. ISSN 0328-8773.
- Lalkovičová, Eva (2020). "Las nuevas escritoras argentinas en el mapa literario: contexto y factores de su entrada a la literatura mundial" (PDF). Colindancias: Revista de la Red de Hispanistas de Europa Central (in Spanish). 2020 (11). West University of Timișoara: 151–169. ISSN 2067-9092.
- Rodríguez, Fermín A. (2016). "Cuerpo y capitalismo: el trabajo de la violencia y el miedo" (PDF). Estrategias. Psicoanálisis y Salud Mental. (in Spanish). 3 (4. Maneras trágicas de matar a una mujer. La sociedad del femicidio). National University of La Plata: 43–46. ISSN 2346-8696.
- Roncato, Sara (27 February 2015). Narrativa argentina contemporánea: el relato del margen-centro en Gabriela Cabezón Cámara e Iosi Havilio (PDF) (Master's degree in European, American, and post-colonial language and literature thesis) (in Spanish). Venice, Italy: Università Ca' Foscari Venezia. Archived from the original (PDF) on 26 November 2021.
