= Iona Macintyre =

Scholar and translator

Iona Macintyre is a scholar and translator, specializing in Latin American culture and literature. She studied at the University of Glasgow, and did her PhD at the University of Nottingham. She now teaches at the University of Edinburgh.

Her English co-translation with Fiona Mackintosh of Argentine author Gabriela Cabezón Cámara's Las aventuras de la China Iron was published by Charco Press as The Adventures of China Iron and shortlisted for the International Booker Prize in 2020. The novel is a re-telling of Martín Fierro, an Argentinian literary classic.

She was one of the translators into English of Escape Goat, the 2020 Portuguese Covid-inspired lockdown novel, brought out by the publisher Relógio D'Água.
