= Antonio de Erauso =

Spanish monastic and explorer (died 1650)

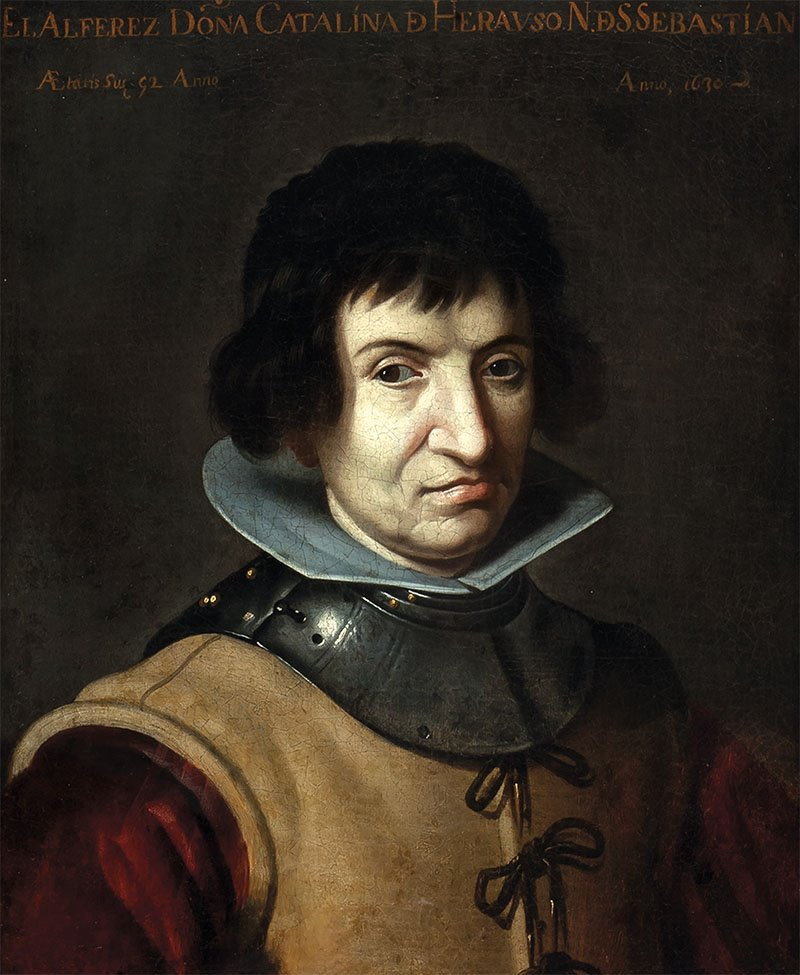
- Portrait attributed to Juan van der Hamen, c.1626
- Born: Catalina de Erauso; 1585 or 1592; San Sebastián, Kingdom of Spain
- Died: 1650; Cotaxtla near Orizaba, New Spain
- Occupation: Explorer

Antonio de Erauso, born as Catalina de Erauso (San Sebastián, Spain, 1585 or 1592 — Cotaxtla near Orizaba, New Spain, 1650), was best known as a Basque explorer. Although born female, from the age of 15 the youth dressed and lived as a boy. He went by Alonso Díaz and some other masculine names, later taking on the name Antonio de Erauso, which he used for the remainder of his life. He is also known in Spanish as La Monja Alférez (The Ensign Nun or The Nun Lieutenant).

Sent to a convent as a young child, Erauso never took vows, and escaped the convent in 1600 at age 15. From then on, using mostly male identities, he travelled around Spain. In 1603, he migrated to Spanish America, where he lived and fought in the first half of the century. Erauso's life was the subject of his own autobiography, as well as historical studies, biographies, novels, movies and comics.

== Early years ==
Erauso was born in the Basque town of San Sebastián, Gipuzkoa, Spain, in either 1585 (according to some sources, including a supposed autobiography of 1626) or February 10, 1592 (according to a baptismal certificate). Erauso's parents were Miguel de Erauso and Maria Pérez de Arce Galarraga, both of whom had been born and lived in San Sebastián. Miguel was a captain and military commander of the Basque province under the orders of King Philip III of Spain. From an early age, Antonio trained with his father and brothers in the arts of warfare.

== Life at the convent ==
Around the year 1589, at age 4, Erauso (together with sisters Isabel and Maria) was placed in the Dominican convent of San Sebastián el Antiguo, where Erauso's mother's cousin, Ursula de Uriza e Sarasti, held the position of prioress. Erauso grew into a strong, stocky, and quick-tempered individual. Lacking religious vocation, feeling imprisoned, and refusing to take vows, Erauso was detained in a cell because of violence.

At 15, after being beaten by one of the older nuns, Erauso decided to escape. On March 18, 1600, Erauso found the keys of the convent hanging, waited for the other nuns to be at morning prayer, and escaped. Erauso spent a week fashioning boy's clothes, and headed for Vitoria, staying off the main roads. With short hair, Erauso easily passed as a boy there.

== Travels around Spain ==
From this moment, Erauso began the life of a fugitive, which he later narrated in the autobiography that brought him great fame. In Vitoria, Erauso met a doctor and professor, Francisco de Cerralta. He was married to a cousin of Erauso's mother, but took the youth in without recognition. Erauso stayed with him for three months, learning some Latin, but when Cerralta became abusive, Erauso left.

Erauso took money from the doctor, met a mule driver and travelled to Valladolid with him. The court of King Philip III of Spain resided in Valladolid, under the influence of the Duke of Lerma. Disguised as a man named Francisco de Loyola, Erauso served in the court for seven months as a page of the king's secretary, Juan de Idiáquez. One day Erauso's father came to speak to Idiáquez. His father talked to Idiáquez, asking for information to find his missing child, describing Antonio's physical appearance and the way he escaped from the convent, all without recognizing that he had just spoken to that youth.

Afterwards, Erauso decided to head to Bilbao. Upon arriving, Erauso was unable to find a place to sleep nor a patron. In addition, a group of boys made fun of and attacked him, and when he got into a rock fight and injured one, he was arrested and spent a month in jail. Upon release from prison, Erauso went to Estella, and found work as a page there, under an important lord of the town called Alonso de Arellano. Erauso was his servant for two years, where he was always well treated and well dressed.

Between 1602 and 1603, after years of service to Arellano, Erauso returned to San Sebastián, his hometown, and lived as a man there, taking care of relatives, whom he saw frequently. He also attended mass in his old convent with former colleagues. It is said that he also served his aunt without ever being recognized. After some time, he came to Pasaia, where he met Captain Miguel de Berróiz, who took him to Seville. They were there for two days. He later returned to Sanlucar de Barrameda, where he found a job as a cabin boy on a ship. Captain Esteban Eguiño, who was a cousin of Erauso's mother, owned the galleon. According to memoirs, Erauso embarked on Holy Monday, 1603 to America. Like many Basques of his time, Erauso wanted to venture to the Indies.

Erauso lived as a man, in masculine dress with short hair; he used a variety of names: Pedro de Orive, Francisco de Loyola, Alonso Díaz [Ramirez] de Guzmán, and Antonio de Erauso. Apparently, his physique was not feminine, which helped him pass as a man. Erauso once said he "dried" his breasts with a secret ointment.

== Travels in the New World ==
Travels of Erauso through Spanish South America.

Erauso's ship first landed at Punta de Araya, now part of Venezuela, where the Spanish had a confrontation with a Dutch pirate fleet, which they defeated. From there they left for Cartagena and Nombre de Dios, where they stayed for nine days. Several sailors died there because of the weather.

They brought the silver shipment on board. When the ship was ready to depart for Spain, Erauso shot and killed his uncle (mother's cousin) and stole 500 pesos. He told the sailors that his uncle had sent him on an errand and left the ship. An hour later, he watched it depart for Spain without him.

He traveled with an usher to Panama, where he started working with Juan de Urquiza, merchant of Trujillo. He went with Urquiza to the port of Paita (now Peru), where the trader had a large shipment. In the port of Manta (now Ecuador), a strong wind destroyed the ship and Erauso had to swim to save himself and his master. The rest of the crew died.

After a brief time in Paita, he went to Zana, a place full of cattle, grains, fruits and tobacco from Peru. There, his master gave Erauso a home, clothing and a large amount of money, as well as three black slaves. In Saña he fought with a young man who threatened him in a comedy theater. He severely cut the man's face. He was taken to jail again. But through efforts of his master, de Urquiza, and the bishop, Erauso was released on a condition: that he marry Doña Beatriz de Cárdenas, lady of his master and aunt of the man whose face he cut. He refused to marry.

He left and went to Trujillo, where his master opened a store. The man he had cut so badly came after him with two friends. Erauso also had a companion in the ensuing fight; one of his challenger's friends was killed, and Erauso was blamed and imprisoned. Although his master saved him again, he gave Erauso money and a letter of recommendation and sent him away to Lima, capital of the Viceroyalty of Peru.

Erauso gave the letter to Diego de Solarte, a very rich merchant and greater consul of Lima. After a few days Erauso was given a shop to manage. He was responsible for the business for nine months, but was fired when discovered fondling a woman, the sister of his master's wife.

He next found a company recruiting to conquer Chile. Erauso enlisted under the command of Captain Gonzalo Rodriguez. Erauso was part of a force of 1600 men traveling from Lima to Concepción. From 1617 to 1619 he worked as a llama-driver for transport of goods between Chuquisaca and the great silver mining center of Potosí. There he was recruited as a soldier.

== Military exploits ==
After the company reached Chile in 1619, the army swept through the lands and property of the Mapuche people. Erauso acted as a conqueror, massacring many Indians. In Chile the secretary of the governor was his brother Don Miguel de Erauso; Miguel welcomed him without recognizing him. Erauso lived there for three years but because of a dispute with his brother, possibly because of a woman, he was banished to Paicabí, territory of Indians.

There, Erauso fought in the service of the crown in the Arauco War against the Mapuche in today's Chile. He earned a reputation for bravery and skill with weapons, without revealing that he was biologically a woman.

In the battle of Valdivia, he was promoted to second lieutenant. In the following battle of Puren, his captain was killed and he took command, winning the battle. Many complaints were made against him for his cruelty to the Indians, and Erauso did not receive more promotions.

He reacted with more violence: killing people he met on the road, and causing extensive damage and burning crops. In Concepción, he assassinated the chief auditor of the city. He was locked in a church for six months, but after release, killed his brother Miguel in a duel. He was imprisoned for eight months.

He later fled to the Governorate of the Río de la Plata (now Argentina) across the Andes, taking a difficult path. At the brink of death, he was saved by a villager and taken to Tucumán. There he promised marriage to two young women: the daughter of an Indian widow (who hosted Erauso on her farm during his convalescence) and the niece of a canon.

Erauso fled without marrying either woman, but kept the money and fine clothing given by the canon's niece as a sign of love. He went to the silver city of Potosí, where he became the assistant to a sergeant. He returned to fight against the Indians, participating in mass killings in Chuncos.

But in La Plata (formerly Chuquisaca, later Sucre, now in Bolivia) he was accused of a crime he did not commit. He was tortured during interrogation and finally freed again without his biological sex being discovered.

Once free, he smuggled wheat and cattle on the orders of Juan Lopez de Arquijo. A new lawsuit forced him to take refuge in a church. In Piscobamba he killed a person in a quarrel. This time he was sentenced to death, but was saved at the last minute by the deposition of another prisoner sentenced to death. He took sanctuary for five months in a church after a duel with a jealous husband.

After moving to La Paz, he was sentenced again to death for another offense. To escape, he pretended to confess. After seizing a consecrated host, he fled to Cuzco and returned to Peru.

== Return to Spain and audience with Pope Urban VIII ==
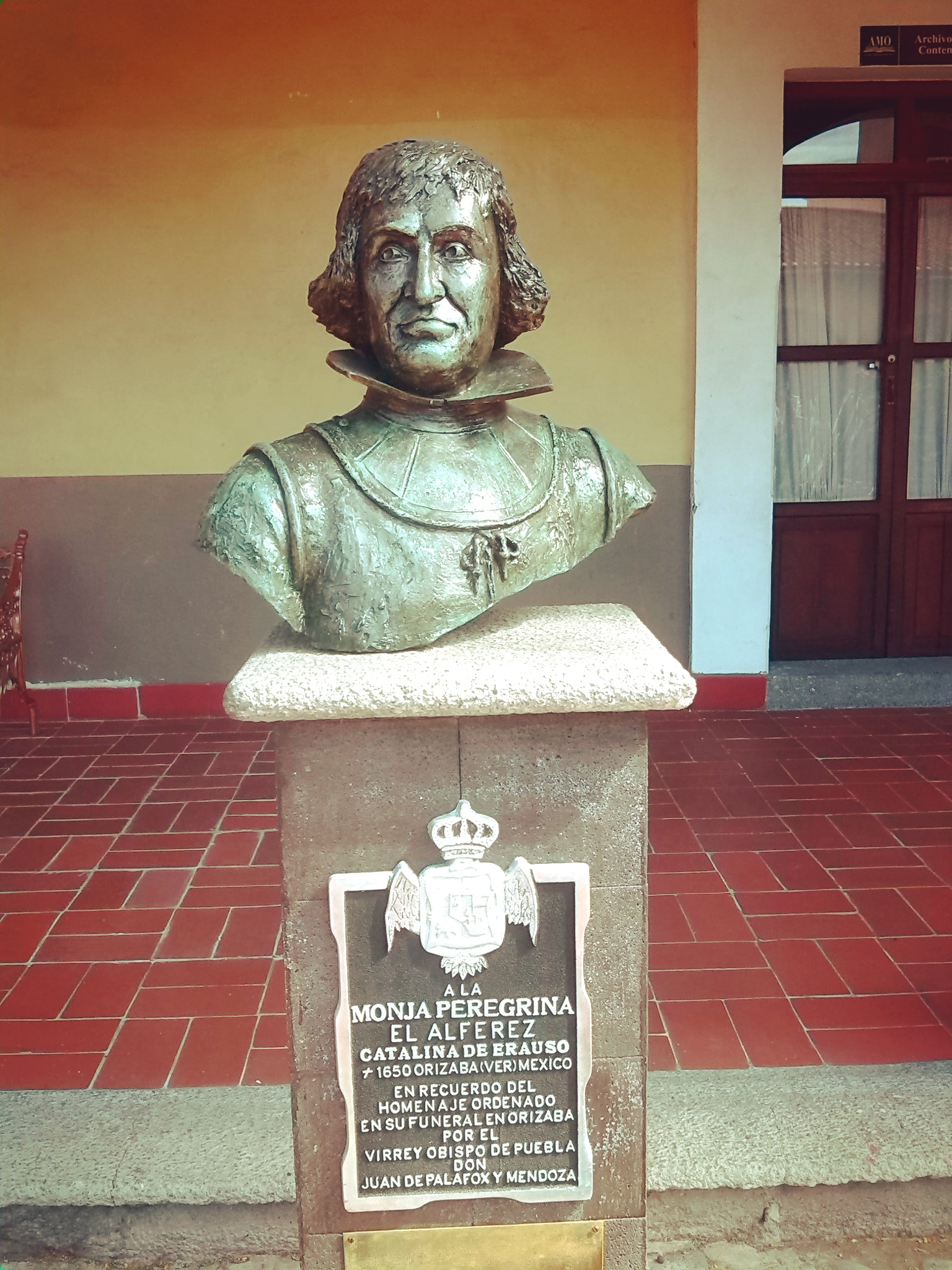
Monument to Catalina de Erauso in Orizaba, Mexico

In 1623 Erauso was arrested in Huamanga, Peru, because of a dispute. To avoid execution, he begged Bishop Agustín de Carvajal for mercy, confessing that he was actually a woman and had been in a convent in early life. Following a review in which a group of matrons determined that Erauso was a woman and a virgin, the bishop protected him, sending him to Spain.

In 1625–1626, Erauso petitioned the Spanish Crown for financial reward for services as a soldier in the New World, presenting a relación de méritos y servicios (account of merits and services). In addition to seeking reward for time at war, Erauso also sought compensation for money lost while traveling to Rome.

This document includes accounts from "witnesses" or others who knew Erauso. However, many of the accounts contradict each other, and some witnesses do not know what to make of Erauso's predicament, for several reasons. Many of the witnesses knew Erauso by different names and for different accomplishments. Also, they may have known "Alonso Díaz de Guzmán", one of the names Erauso used as a man, but they did not know Catalina de Erauso.

Scholars disagree on whether or not Erauso met Pope Urban VIII. His "Account of Merits and Services" was filed in 1625 or 1626 in the Archivo General de Indias and the Real Academia de la Historia of Madrid, which matches up with accounts of him being in Rome at that time.

Erauso was already so famous in Spain that Juan Pérez de Montalbán published a play about his life in 1625, the Comedia famosa de la Monja Alférez.

== Return to New Spain and death ==
In 1630 Erauso settled in New Spain (now Mexico), probably in the city of Orizaba, now in the state of Veracruz. He established a business as a muleteer between Mexico City and Veracruz.

Locals state that Erauso died in 1650 carrying a load on a boat. Some, argue he died alone at the heights of Orizaba. The most plausible account says that he died in the village of Cotaxtla.

According to historian Joaquín Arróniz, his remains rest in the Church of the Royal Hospital of Our Lady of the Immaculate Conception of the Juaninos Brothers. Today it is popularly known as the Church of San Juan de Dios, in the city of Orizaba, Veracruz, Mexico. Although there is no solid evidence to support it, some postulate that Bishop Juan de Palafox tried to move the remains to the city of Puebla, home of the bishopric, but failed. Instead, according to other historians, the remains of Erauso rest in the same place where it is believed he died, in the village of Cotaxtla. There is no documentation that demonstrates the exact date and place of death.

== Autobiography and controversy over its authorship ==
Antonio de Erauso (under the name Catalina de Erauso) wrote or dictated an autobiography around the time of his visit to Spain in 1626. The autobiography remained in manuscript form until it was first published in Paris in 1829 at the request of Joaquín María Ferrer. It was released a second time in Barcelona in 1838, and for a third time in 1894 in Paris, with illustrations by Spanish artist Daniel Vierge. The account was subsequently translated into other languages.

In the 21st century, researchers have strongly debated the authorship of this autobiography. Some have characterized it as apocryphal, and without any basis for engaging in its chronological inaccuracies and contradictions.

But, given the evidence of baptism certificates and testimonies from others about Erauso's life and works, historians believe there is strong evidence for the historical existence of this person.

Some have suggested that there is a relationship between Erauso's extraordinary life and the Baroque taste for portraying marginal and / or deformed or abnormal characters, as the main reason for the fame he gained throughout the Hispanic world after his return from the New World in the early 1620s.

== Questions of gender and sexual identity ==
Modern scholars have debated Erauso's sexual orientation and gender identity. In a memoir, Erauso never mentions being attracted to a man, but details numerous relationships with women. There was an encounter with the sister-in-law of a Lima merchant, a quarrel with Erauso's brother over his mistress and other occasions of Erauso being betrothed to women in the New World. Those betrothals, however, usually ended after Erauso exploited the situation and rode off with gifts and dowry money. Erauso also mentions once being surprised by a hostess "touching between her legs," and also acknowledges having taken advantage twice of being 'disguised' as a man to get gifts from a future fiancée who did not know Erauso's sex.

Other scholars, such as Sherry Velasco, have also written on the subject of gender and sexual identity. Velasco and others argue for viewing Erauso as transgender, and Velasco also argues for viewing Erauso as lesbian, saying that, over the years since the first printings of Erauso's memoirs, there have been many different retellings and exaggerations in an effort to "de-lesbianize" Erauso through the invention of different heterosexual relationships as well as downplaying Erauso's relationships and behavior with other women. This happened mostly in versions of the story told and published in the nineteenth century. In the 20th century, Velasco argues there was a "re-lesbianization" of Erauso, initially in heterosexual, femme-fatale narratives in the 1940s to appeal to younger women as glamorous. Velasco concludes that in accounts beginning in the 1980s, Erauso appeared as a "melancholy lesbian whose lover dies and a voyeuristic lesbian whose narrative ends with the optimistic image of the protagonist accompanied by the object of her sexual desire."

Matthew Goldmark, in turn, takes the approach of examining Erauso's Accounts of Merits and Services document, and in particular the "hábitos" or "habits" section of the document, with an eye to his sexual orientation and identity. This section gives accounts from witnesses or other people who knew Erauso and could speak to his demeanor in petitioning the King and the Pope. This section also was an intersection of not only gender, but also class and profession.

Regardless of how Erauso identified, researchers are still divided as to the reason for Erauso's grand story of adventures. Some argue that Erauso had to pretend to be attracted to women in order to stay disguised and to blend in with fellow Spanish soldiers. Others argue that Erauso was a lesbian who used dress to evade attention from church authorities and to continue to be attracted to women. Still others fall into the third camp: saying that Erauso did identify as a man. Those in this school of thought conclude from the evidence given by Erauso that he was expressing a gender identity and was transgender.

== Legacy ==
Despite the autobiographical memoirs probably written around 1626, Erauso disappeared from most known historical records, specifically in the period between returning to Spain in 1624 and then to New Spain, until the late eighteenth century. At the end of the century, states Sonia Pérez-Villanueva, a man named Domingo de Urbirú possessed a manuscript copy of Erauso's memoirs. It was copied by a friend, poet and playwright Cándido Maria Trigueros.

One of the copies made by Trigueros ended up in the hands of the academic Juan Bautista Muñoz, who was writing the History of the New World. He mentioned Erauso in this work. Eventually, the copy used as a reference by Muñoz reached the Royal Academy of History in 1784.

In the early nineteenth century the politician Felipe Bauzá, was said to rediscover it. He persuaded his friend, astronomer and merchant Joaquín María Ferrer, to arrange for publication. Finally, the manuscript was published in 1829 in Paris by Jules Didot with the title La historia de la Monja Alférez, escrita por ella misma ("story of The Nun Lieutenant, written by herself"). A few decades later this republished by Heredia in 1894. This version gained attention and revived interest in and research into Erauso's life.

The character of 'The Nun Lieutenant' was, and remains today, a source of inspiration for writers, playwrights, filmmakers and artists. (A 1630 portrait was attributed to Juan van der Hamen).

In the nineteenth century, the work of Thomas De Quincey stands out. He portrayed Erauso into a typically romantic character, victim of fate, and immersed in a series of adventures. Also in the nineteenth century, the novel by Eduardo Blasco, Del claustro al campamento o la Monja Alférez, presented a similar view.

The autobiography inspired many analyses and academic papers trying to explain Erauso's complex life and personality.

In the twentieth century, Erauso was portrayed in several films, including the Mexican film The Lieutenant Nun (La monja alférez), directed by Emilio Gómez Muriel (1944), and the Spanish film of the same name directed by Javier Aguirre (1986).

A 1996 English translation of Erauso's autobiography, by Michele and Gabriel Stepto, was a finalist for the first Lambda Literary Award for Transgender Literature. This book renewed academic study of Erauso, particularly among English speakers.

In 2019, textual analysis via AI concluded that a 17th-century play called La Monja Alférez, whose authorship had not been known, was written by Juan Ruiz de Alarcón.

In 2023, Argentine writer Gabriela Cabezón Cámara published the novel We Are Green and Trembling (Spanish: Las niñas del naranjel) based on the life of Erauso. The novel won the 2024 Sor Juana Inés de la Cruz Prize, the 2025 National Book Award for Translated Literature and was longlisted for the 2026 International Booker Prize.

== See also ==
- Eleno de Céspedes

== Bibliography ==
- de Erauso, Catalina (1996). Stepto, Michele (ed.). Lieutenant Nun: Memoir of a Basque Transvestite in the New World. Boston: Beacon Press.
- Velasco, Sherry (2000-01-01). The Lieutenant Nun: Transgenderism, Lesbian Desire, and Catalina de Erauso. University of Texas Press. ISBN 978-0-292-78746-9.
- Pérez-Villanueva, Sonia (2014). The Life of Catalina de Erauso, the Lieutenant Nun: An Early Modern Autobiography. Rowman & Littlefield. ISBN 978-1-61147-661-3.
- (in Spanish) Historia de la monja alférez escrita por ella misma. Presentación y epílogo de Jesús Munárriz. Madrid, Ediciones Hiperión, 2000. ISBN 978-84-7517-652-9
- (in Spanish) Historia de la monja alférez. Amigos del Libro Vasco, Echevarri,1986.
- (in Spanish) Historia de la monja alférez D.ª Catalina de Erauso. Catalina de Erauso. Barcelona : Imp. de José Tauló, 1838
- (in Spanish) Miguel de Erauso (senior), el abuelo de la Monja Alférez: una inmersión en la vida donostiarra (1592). José Ignacio Tellechea Idigoras. En: Boletín de estudios históricos sobre San Sebastián. n. 39 (2005), p. 81-154
- (in Spanish) Doña Catalina de Erauso: la monja alférez: IV centenario de su nacimiento. José Ignacio Tellechea Idígoras. ISBN 84-7173-205-X
- (in Spanish) Historia del Nuevo Mundo. Juan Bautista Muñoz. Madrid, 1794
- (in Spanish) La historia de la Monja Alférez, escrita por ella misma. Catalina de Erauso. Comentada y editada por Joaquín María Ferrer. París: Imp. de Julio Didot, 1829
- (in Spanish) La historia de la monja Alférez, escrita por ella misma. Catalina de Erauso. Traducción de José María de Heredia. París, 1894
