= Le viste la cara a Dios =

Argentine short story about sex trafficking

- Author: Gabriela Cabezón Cámara
- Language: Spanish
- Genre: Short story
- Publication date: 2011
- Publication place: Argentina
- ISBN: 978-956-9648-51-9
- Preceded by: La Virgen Cabeza
- Followed by: Romance de la negra rubia

Le viste la cara a Dios (English: You Saw the Face of God) is a short story about human trafficking by Argentine writer Gabriela Cabezón Cámara, first published in 2011. It was the first ebook in Spanish to be chosen as book of the year by Revista Ñ, an arts and culture magazine published by Argentine newspaper Clarín. It also ranked third on the 2011 book-of-the-year list by Buenos Aires bookshop Eterna Cadencia.

The plot tells the story of Beya, a young woman who is kidnapped by a prostitution ring and who is looking for a way to escape the constant torture and rape of which she is a victim. It makes several references to case of Marita Verón, a 23-year-old Argentine girl who was kidnapped in 2002 by a trafficking network. It is dedicated to the desire for Marita to be found alive, along with todas las nenas, adolescentes y mujeres esclavas de las redes de prostitución. (Note: English: All the young girls, teenage girls, and women enslaved by prostitution rings)

In 2013, a version of the story was published in graphic novel format with the title Beya (Le viste la cara a Dios), featuring illustrations by Iñaki Echeverría. Both the original version and the graphic novel had positive critical reception and received institutional recognition, such as from the Argentine Senate, for their impact on society.

== Plot ==
The protagonist of the story, whose real name is unknown, is a young girl who studies, works, and performs community service in a children's hospital on the outskirts of the city. One day she is kidnapped by a human trafficking network and forcibly taken to a brothel located in Lanús, where she is subjected to constant abuse by the pimp known as El Rata (Note: English: The Rat) and his henchmen, who beat her and drug her with cocaine to prevent her from falling asleep during the fifteen hours a day in which they prostitute her. She is soon nicknamed Beya. This sounds phonetically similar to Bella, which is Spanish for "beautiful". According to Lastero, the deliberate substitution of the /ll/ sound for the /y/ sound is meant to evoke the exaggerated pronunciation of the /y/ by people from the Río de la Plata region of Argentina.

In order to cope with her situation, the protagonist learns to disassociate her mind from her body while she is being raped and to imagine that she is floating upwards to take refuge with God.

Some time later, Beya decides to pretend to have fallen in love with El Rata, and to also show a more submissive attitude towards him. This leads him to have more considerations towards her, which includes reducing the number of hours per day in which she is prostituted. Eventually she gains El Rata's trust but continues to pray to cope with her situation. One of her clients hears her prayers and introduces himself to her as Lieutenant López of the Buenos Aires police. He gives her a St. George medal and promises to take care of her.

One day, one of the other women who had been kidnapped attempts to ask for help in order to escape, so El Rata savagely beats her almost to death and asks Beya to give her the coup de grâce. She obeys and this officially makes her a part of her captor's gang, since he had given her that test as a rite of passage. After talking to El Rata, she manages to convince him to move her to the S&M area of the brothel. By taking on the role of dominatrix, this allows her to unleash some of her anger about all that has happened to her. Beya regains her strength and one day finds a submachine gun that Lieutenant López had left in her room. She hides the gun in her panties and goes to El Rata. Then, she unloads a volley of bullets and kills him and everyone present. Beya leaves the brothel and meets in the Church of St George with Lieutenant López, who gets her a false passport with which she can finally escape to Madrid.

== Structure ==
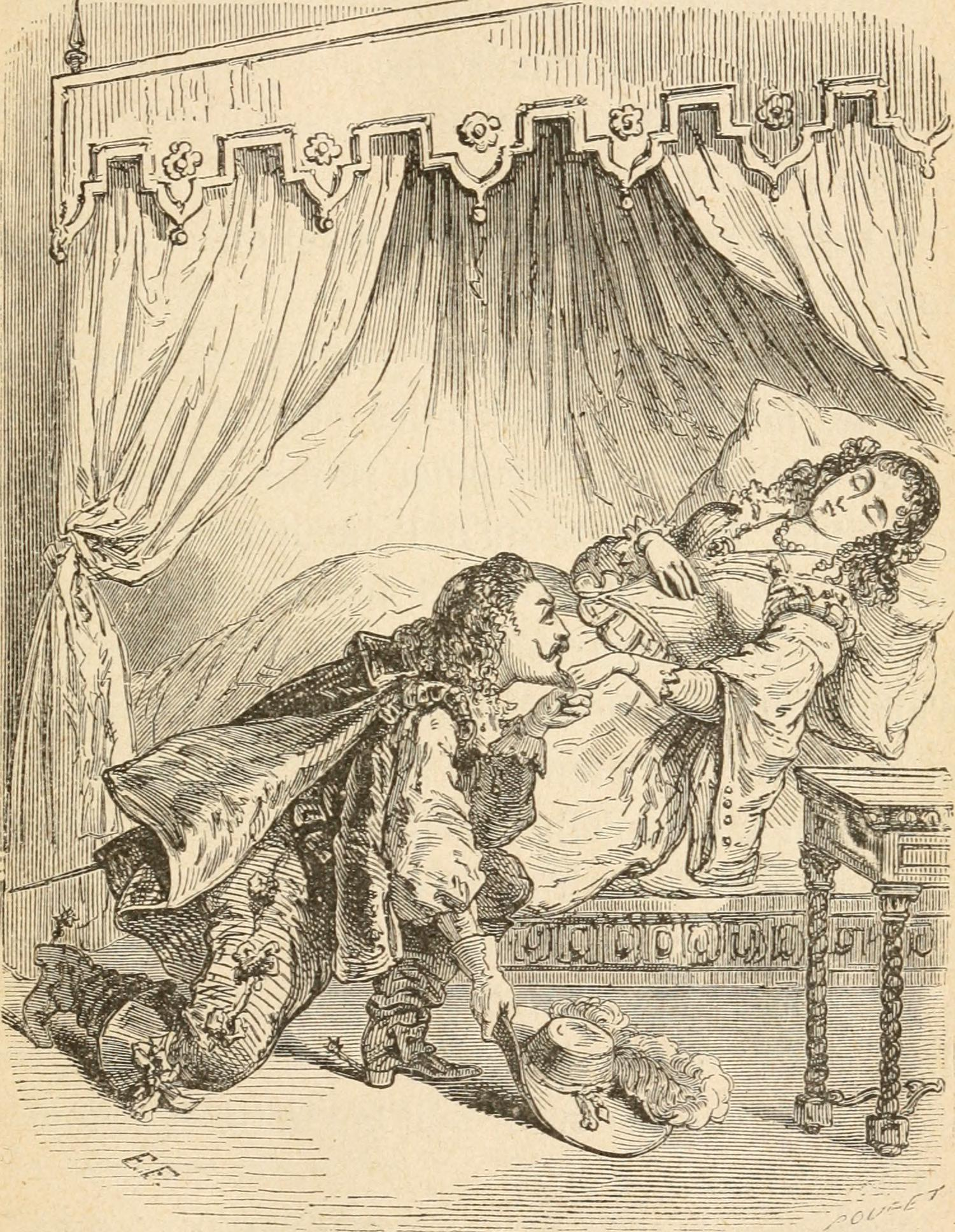
The story of Sleeping Beauty served as the creative trigger for the story.

The author started writing the story after having received an invitation in 2010 from digital publishing house SigueLeyendo.es, owned by writer Cristina Fallarás, to take part in a project that sought to create new versions of classic fairy tales for adult audiences. Cabezón Cámara was asked to take Sleeping Beauty as a starting point, which inspired her to write the story with a protagonist in a situation of sexual slavery. This protagonist is nicknamed Beya durmiente (Note: A pun on "Sleeping Beauty" as Beya sounds phonetically similar to Bella, which is Spanish for "beautiful") because she tries to sleep in an attempt to disassociate from the rapes she is subjected to and thus escape from the pain. The story was released for sale in 2011 in digital format.

Structurally, the story is divided into three chapters and makes repeated use of octosyllabic verse. It is also almost entirely written in the second person. According to the author, she made this stylistic choice because she did not think she would have been able to convey in the first person the intensity of the pain suffered by a trafficked woman, while an extradiegetic narrator posed the difficulty of not being able to determine to whom the voice might belong. She ultimately chose the second person in order to portray the disassociation of the protagonist, who takes refuge in an inner space away from her kidnappers and from what her body is feeling.

The story contains numerous references to works such as the Bible, El Gaucho Martín Fierro, and Kill Bill, among others. The title of the story is in turn a reference to the Argentine expression verle la cara a Dios, (Note: English: To see the face of God) used in relation to the pleasure of the first sexual experience of young boys, which used to take place in brothels where they were taken by their father or another relative as a rite of passage.

== Analysis ==
Le viste la cara a Dios depicts the drama of prostitution and sex slavery rings. To explore the horror of this reality, Cabezón Cámara uses terms and phrases related to the meat industry and the slaughter of cattle for human consumption as a metaphor for the degradation and objectification suffered by the protagonist. Some of the descriptions that stand out include: the characterization of the brothel as a matadero infecto (Note: English: Disgusting slaughterhouse) and the threat that at the slightest provocation te pasan a degüello como un chancho y te filetean como jamón cuando quieran. (Note: English: They slit your throat like a pig and carve you like a leg of ham whenever they want) The graphic novel version is more explicit with these comparisons and shows an image of Beya in which arrows point to various parts of her body to label them like cuts of meat. Another example is the depiction of The Last Supper, in which Beya takes the place of Jesus and is the one who feeds her flesh to the group of men who surround her.

The idea of using the meat trade as a metaphor for forced prostitution, in which women become human cattle for consumption, has a long-standing tradition in Argentine literature. Among the works referenced by the author is El matadero (in English, The Slaughter Yard) from 1837, a short story by Esteban Echeverría, considered by critics to be one of the foundational works of Argentine literature. It tells the story of a rape.

The story uses explicit language to narrate the abuse suffered by Beya as a way of highlighting the atmosphere of violence and the process of destruction this abuse puts her through, which can be seen in the following excerpt:

La cuestión es que te garchan el Cuervo Rata y amigos, más el juez, los policías, el cerdo gobernador y muchos clientes civiles van pasando de a uno en fondo. A veces te la dan de a dos, pero por suerte ya no la patota entera, el límite lo puso el Rata que creyó en tu amor. Uno te acaba en la boca y el otro te rompe el orto…te fornican y te aplastan para que no te quede más ninguna interioridad. (Note: English: The thing is that El Cuervo Rata and his friends are fucking you, plus the judge, the policemen, the pig of a governor, and many civilian clients all in a row. Sometimes they fuck you two at a time, but at least not the whole gang at once anymore. El Rata put a stop to that, believing that you're in love with him. One of them comes in your mouth and the other destroys your asshole... they fuck you and they crush you so that your inner being is annihilated.)

Cabezón Cámara also describes how the act of rape is used by the aggressors to establish dominance over the body, which in their eyes becomes a territory over which they have governance rights and which they can freely share with others. The story stresses precisely the attempt by El Rata and his henchmen to "tame" Beya through beatings and rape, in a process that includes taking away her speech and her identity and annihilating her subjectivity as a way of dehumanizing her.

== Reception ==
When the story—as well as its graphic novel adaptation—was published, this had quite an impact on Argentina. Among the distinctions it received was the Alfredo Palacios award, granted by the Argentine Senate in recognition of its contribution to the fight against human trafficking networks. It was also declared as a work of public interest by the Buenos Aires City Legislature and nominated for the Reader's Prize at the Buenos Aires International Book Fair.

The work was well received by critics. Revista Ñ included it in its list of the ten best literary works of 2011. Laura Cardona, in an article for newspaper La Nación, referred to the story as un texto riquísimo y necesario (Note: English: An extremely rich and necessary piece of writing) in which todo resulta impactante. (Note: English: Everything turns out to be impactful) Some of the aspects she drew attention to include the references to other works, the way in which Beya's degradation was narrated, and the use of the second person to express the disassociation of the protagonist, to which Cardona referred as una apuesta audaz y logradísima de la autora. (Note: English: A bold and very successful gamble by the author) On its part, the review by Página 12 referred to the story as un relato hipnótico a partir de una cadencia rítmica que se repite y que con el correr de las páginas gana la fuerza de un texto religioso. (Note: English: A mesmerizing story starting from a rhythmic cadence that repeats itself and that, as one moves along the pages, takes in the strength of a religious text)

Several reviews stressed how the nature of the work establishes itself against human trafficking and violence against women in general. The review by Clarín referred to this aspect and claimed that the story proposed una denuncia sobre la condición de la mujer en círculos machistas y maltratadores (Note: English: A condemnation of the condition of women in misogynistic and abusive circles) while magazine Cosecha Roja referred to it as un grito desesperado (Note: English: A desperate cry) written for those who sostienen que esos crímenes sigan, desde el cliente hasta el politico. (Note: English: Support the continuation of those crimes, from clients to politicians) Similar opinions were shared by Argentine politician Laura Vilches who, in an article for La Izquierda Diario in which she analyzed the work, criticized the various forms of violence that women like Beya are subjected to every day and called for the dismantling of trafficking networks.

== Adaptations ==
The work was adapted to graphic novel format and published in 2013 with the title Beya (Le viste la cara a Dios) by publishing house Eterna Cadencia. It was illustrated by artist Iñaki Echeverría, whom Cabezón Cámara had met in a group of artists with whom she had discussed the possibility of writing a graphic crime novel. For the illustration process, Echeverría decided to use black and white drawings. He included elements of Christian iconography as well as representations of famous works of art, such as Michelangelo's Pietà, Gustav Klimt's The Kiss, or Leonardo da Vinci's The Last Supper. This version is split into five chapters.

Moreover, the story has been adapted twice for the theater. The first time was in 2016 by actress Marisa Busker, while the second one was in 2019 by actress and director Victoria Roland with the title Beya Durmiente, with the performance of Carla Crespo.

== See also ==
- Disappearance of Marita Verón
- Human trafficking in Argentina
- Gabriela Cabezón Cámara
- Romance de la negra rubia

== Bibliography ==
- Bianchi, Paula Daniela (29 May 2015). Ostrov, Andrea (ed.). "Suspensión de derechos en Le viste la cara a Dios de Gabriela Cabezón Cámara y El trabajo de Aníbal Jarkowski" (PDF). Orillas. Rivista d'Ispanistica. (in Spanish). 4 (RUMBOS. Il corpo deviante). University of Padua. ISSN 2280-4390.
- Favaro, Alice (25 September 2019). "La "Beya" durmiente: entre reescritura y transposición" (PDF). Cuadernos del Centro de Estudios en Diseño y Comunicación (Ensayos) (in Spanish). XX (74 : Artes Dibujadas: cartografías y escenas de la Historieta, el Humor Gráfico y la Animación). Buenos Aires, Argentina: University of Palermo (Buenos Aires): 43–56. doi:10.18682/cdc.vi74. ISSN 1668-0227.
- Lastero, Lucila (August 2019). "Textualidades diversas, cuerpo fragmentado. Una lectura de Beya. (Le viste la cara a Dios) de Gabriela Cabezón Cámara e Iñaki Echeverría" (PDF). Revista Jornaler@s de Estudios Literarios y Lingüísticos (in Spanish). 4 (4). San Salvador de Jujuy, Argentina: National University of Jujuy: 250–259. ISSN 2362-2865.
- Maradei, Guadalupe (2018). "Ficciones posdictadura: la trilogía oscura de Gabriela Cabezón Cámara". In Ingenschay, Dieter (ed.). Eventos del deseo: sexualidades minoritarias en las culturas/literaturas de España y Latinoamérica a finales del siglo XX (in Spanish). Madrid-Frankfurt: Iberoamericana-Veuvert. pp. 123–140. ISBN 978-84-16922-71-0.
- Rodríguez, Fermín (3 May 2016). "Cuerpo y capitalismo: el trabajo de la violencia y el miedo". Estrategias. Psicoanálisis y Salud Mental. (in Spanish). 3 (4). La Plata, Buenos Aires Province, Argentina: National University of La Plata: 43–46. ISSN 2347-0933.
- Roncato, Sara (27 February 2015). Narrativa argentina contemporánea: el relato del margen-centro en Gabriela Cabezón Cámara e Iosi Havilio (PDF) (Master's degree in European, American, and post-colonial language and literature thesis) (in Spanish). Venice, Italy: Università Ca' Foscari Venezia.
