= La Virgen Cabeza =

2009 debut novel by Argentine author Gabriela Cabezón Cámara

- Author: Gabriela Cabezón Cámara
- Language: Spanish
- Genre: Novel
- Published: 2009
- Publisher: Eterna Cadencia
- Publication place: Argentina
- Followed by: Le viste la cara a Dios

La Virgen Cabeza (English: Slum Virgin) is the debut novel by Argentine writer Gabriela Cabezón Cámara, published in 2009 by Eterna Cadencia. The plot tells the story of Cleopatra—a travesti who is revered as a saint in a slum in Buenos Aires after she begins to communicate with the Virgin Mary—and her love affair with Qüity, a reporter from a sensationalist media outlet. Among the themes explored in the book are popular religion, social exclusion, political corruption, violence, and sexual diversity, several of which the author would return to in later works.

The novel was well received by critics upon publication and helped position Cabezón Cámara in the Latin American literary canon.

== Plot ==
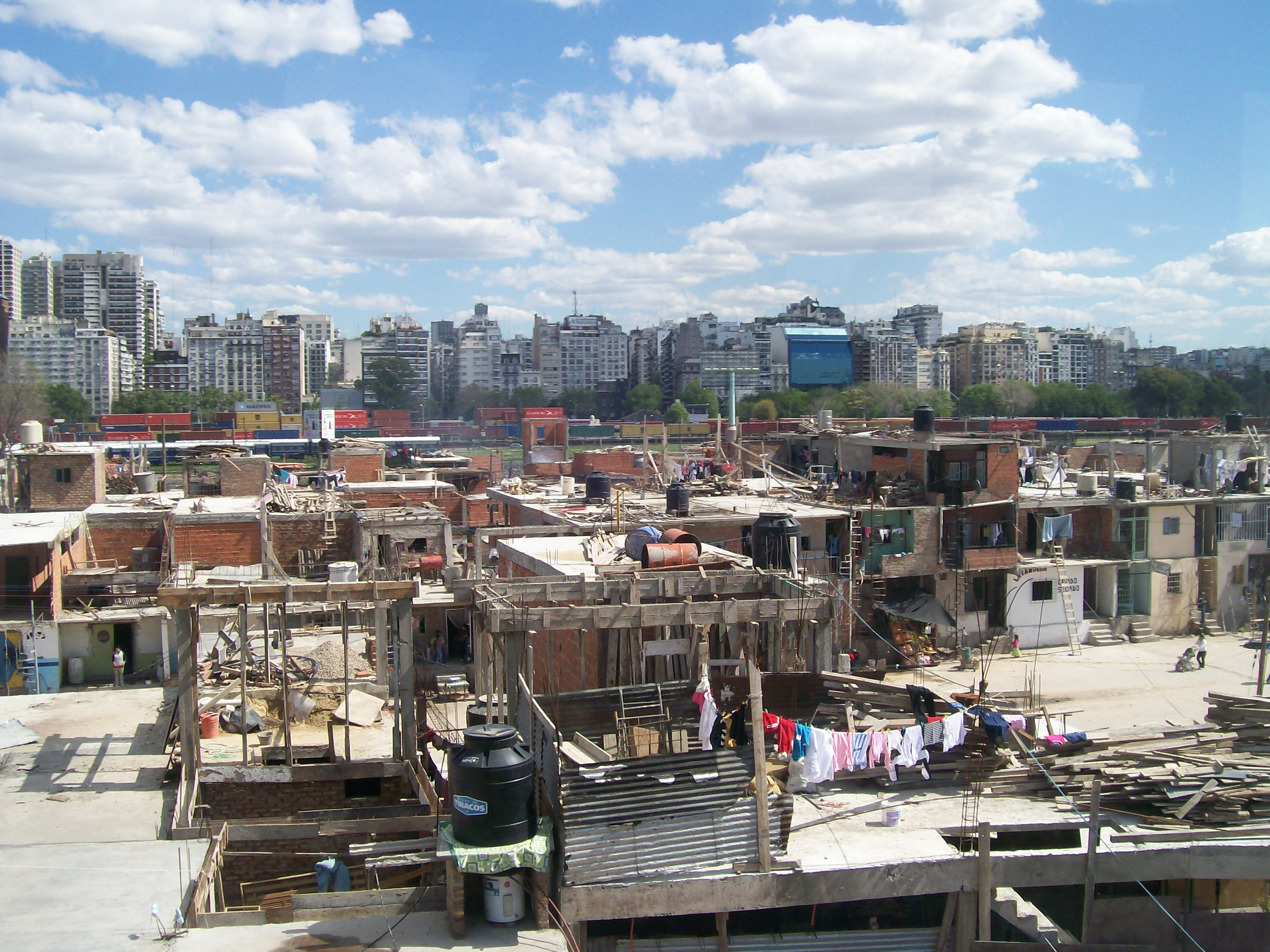
The plot takes place in a slum in Buenos Aires.

Qüity is a journalist in search of a good story that will allow her to win a grant to resume her studies in literature. She soon decides to use, as the subject of her article, the slum called El Poso and its peculiar leader, a travesti known as Hermana Cleopatra, (Note: English: Sister Cleopatra) who used to work as a prostitute and was now revered as a saint by the members of the community. According to the story, one night when Cleopatra was the victim of a beating and gang rape in a police station, she heard the voice of the Virgin Mary, who then cleaned her clothes, healed her wounds, and left her a cup of tea with some medias lunas (croissants). Upon seeing what had happened, her attackers repented and began to praise the miracle, which launched her rise as the spiritual guide of the neighborhood. The inhabitants soon built an image of the Virgin out of plaster in order to worship her. This statue came to be known as the Virgen Cabeza. The term cabeza (Note: English: Lit., head) here is a reference to the inhabitants of the villa miseria or the slum. It is a pejorative term used to refer to the lower classes. In Rioplatense Spanish, the term is a throwback to the expression cabecita negra (Note: English: Lit., black little head), which appeared in Buenos Aires in the 1940s when people began to migrate from rural areas to the capital city as a result of industrialization. The expression was used—and is still used today—by wealthy people to refer in a pejorative manner to those migrants, most of whom were of indigenous descent and, by extension, to all non-white people and the working class.

During her time in El Poso, Qüity witnesses firsthand Cleopatra's attempts to get the neighborhood back on track, including the construction of a pond in which they place carps they have stolen from an upper-class suburb. This soon makes them famous throughout the city due the success with which the carps reproduce, a fact they celebrate at parties in which drugs and alcohol flow freely and cumbia music plays. She also witnesses several of the miracles that Cleopatra performs after speaking with the plaster Virgin, as well as her attempts to get the young people from the neighborhood to stop using drugs and stealing, and to protect themselves from venereal diseases and the abuse that many suffer at the hands of the mafia and corrupt authorities.

One day the police serve them with an eviction notice since there were plans to build a luxury private club in the neighborhood, but most of them refuse to leave. With the eviction imminent, the inhabitants prepare their defense, despite Cleopatra's attempts to calm things down. However, the eviction turns out to be much more brutal than everyone imagined: the police arrive with armored vehicles and begin a massacre that leaves 183 people dead. Qüity had left hours earlier to do something at her place of work, so she managed to escape. Cleopatra witnesses the killings firsthand and is one of the few people to survive.

Some time later, she arrives at Qüity's apartment with the head of the plaster Virgin, the only relic she managed to save. As the days go by, Qüity and Cleopatra realize how they feel about each other and begin a romantic relationship, which leads Cleo to come out as a lesbian. Later, fearing that the police are looking for them, they flee to Miami, where they write a cumbia opera called La Virgen Cabeza based on the events that took place in El Poso, which becomes a raging success. Cleopatra feels inspired and travels to Cuba to preach the word of the Virgin. When Qüity finds out, she decides to go after her to bring her back and prevent her from squandering their fortune, determined to have her prosecuted or deported if necessary.

== Main characters ==
- Cleopatra: known as Hermana Cleo, (Note: English: Sister Cleo) she's a travesti who claims to communicate with the Virgin Mary and who is revered by the residents of El Poso, a slum located in the northern part of Buenos Aires. In her childhood, when she still used the name Carlos Guillermo, she dreamed of being a vedette and appearing in television. She was later abused by her father, police sergeant Ramón Lobos, who refused to accept her gender identity. Cleopatra's physical description in the book is of a black woman who stands 1.90 meters tall and wears a blonde wig, which gives her the appearance of una especie de Doris Day de albañilería. (Note: English: Like a cross between Doris Day and a builder) She used to work as a prostitute, but decided to leave that life behind to become the leader of the neighborhood and guide it towards salvation after having come in contact with the Virgin Mary, who whispers to her the various changes that need to be made in El Poso.
- Qüity: she's a 35-year-old crime reporter who launches an investigation into the events surrounding Cleopatra, but who ends up falling in love with her. Her real name is Catalina but everyone knows her as Qüity. The first time she arrives in El Poso, she is fearful of being attacked, a feeling that persists until a traumatic event makes her feel like a member of the community. Along with Cleopatra, she decides to take care of a boy she grows fond of but is left devastated when the child is killed during the massacre perpetrated by the police. After moving with Cleopatra to Miami, she gets pregnant, and they decide to form a family.
- Daniel: he's a photographer, a friend of Qüity who works for the Secretariat of Intelligence of Argentina. He was also the one who introduced Cleopatra to Qüity.

== Composition ==
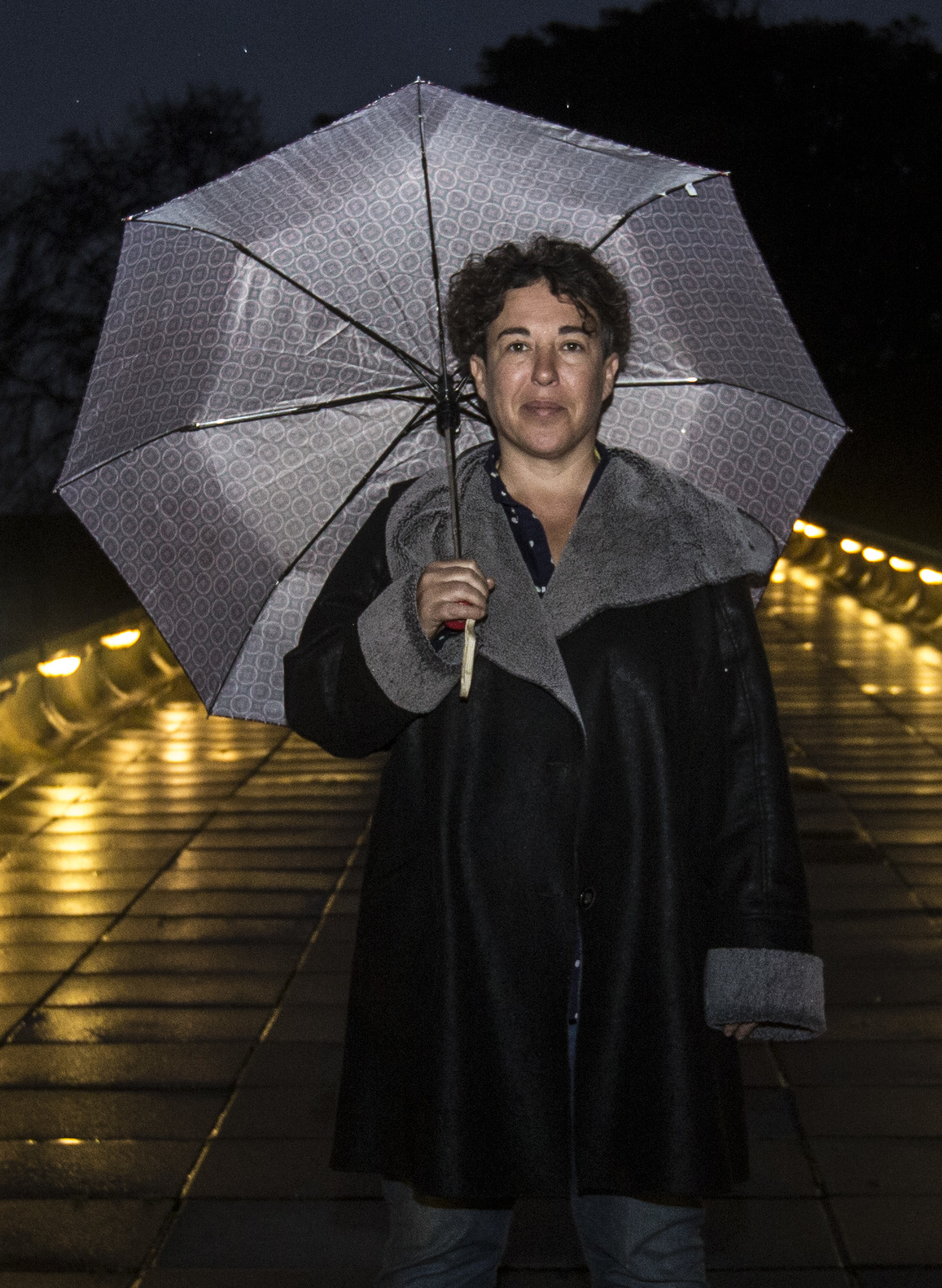
Gabriela Cabezón Cámara in 2016

Cabezón Cámara wrote the novel in the spare time allowed by her job as a media layout designer. She has claimed that her original idea was to write a book that would portray the capitalism of the period of the Carlos Menem administration and its subsequent years, through the story of a shantytown that is constantly watched by security cameras. However, the novel took a turn when she began writing the voice of the character Cleopatra, who was born as a tribute to a friend of hers, a travesti named Paula who was murdered when she was young. This led her to rethink several aspects of the novel and to give more emphasis to themes such as oppression and collective organization in the final version of the book.

A first draft excerpt of the novel appeared as a short story with the title La hermana Cleopatra in the anthology Una terraza propia, published by Norma in 2006.

== Structure and style ==
The novel is presented in the form of a supposed manuscript written by Qüity during her stay in Miami with Cleopatra. Throughout the document, the latter makes notes and gives her version of several events in a semantic register of her own. Structurally, the novel is divided into 25 chapters and an epilogue, 20 of which are narrated by Qüity—in addition to the epilogue—and five by Cleopatra. The title of each chapter includes the name of its narrator, as well as a phrase from a speech representative of its contents. Nine of the chapters begin with a quotation that rhymes.

Cabezón's prose builds the atmosphere of the story through the mixture of the poetic genre with colloquialisms, shantytown slang, phrases in Spanglish, and constant references to musical genres such as cumbia or reggaeton. The sections in which Cleo speaks to the Virgin are written in a more formal language, described in the novel as "medieval," with multiple references to the Odyssey and other classical works which, along with the language used by the rest of the characters, creates a style that in the novel is referred to as lengua cumbianchera, (Note: English: Cumbia language) an example of which can be identified in the following excerpt:

Aguante, Virgen Cabeza, que esta Catedral miseria is a very serious thing aunque una fiesta sin fin de pura merca y cerveza nos tenga de la cabeza. (Note: English: Long live the Slum Virgin, may her party never end, there's always room for another friend here where there's so much blow and beer that it's coming out of our ears.)

There are marked differences between Qüity's and Cleopatra's narrative register. While the former has a style similar to journalistic writings and noir fiction, always providing rational explanations to the facts, Cleopatra uses a much more lively and informal language, besides making frequent spelling mistakes, such as adding a letter /s/ at the end of the second conjugation of verbs in simple past tense (as in the case of contastes instead of contaste, or escribistes instead of escribiste).

Another peculiarity of the novel's style is the use of humor to describe tragic scenes, which gives a farcical air to the narrative. It is also characterized by the use of explicit language when exploring the sexuality of the characters, with descriptions that take on a hyperbolic and obscene tone as a way of portraying the rawness of the environment in which the characters interact, as illustrated below:

Quise la poronga de Cleo como no había querido ninguna otra antes (...) me acomodó con las piernas abiertas sobre su falda y se la levantó apenas y me entró en la concha con ese porongón que tiene y que me pareció hecho a medida para mí y yo me dejé coger y me la cogí. (Note: English: (...) and I wanted Cleo's dick like I'd never wanted any other dick before (...) spread my legs, stood up just a little and penetrated me with that huge dick of hers that seemed tailor-made for me. And I let her fuck me and I fucked her as she cried too.)

== Central themes ==
=== Poverty and social exclusion ===
One of the themes explored in the novel is the reality of poverty and social marginalization, and their ties to the systems of exclusion that perpetuate them. To explore these ideas, Cabezón Cámara uses the slum of El Poso as a representation of marginalized settlements in general. The name of the slum itself, El Poso, alludes both to pozo (Note: English: Lit. well, lowland, pit) as a reference to the low areas where irregular settlements are usually located, and to poso, (Note: English: Lit. dregs, sediment) in the sense of residues or waste, which can be interpreted as the dregs of society. This exclusion from the rest of the social classes takes physical form in the wall that separates El Poso from those neighborhoods in the city that are of a better social class. Apart from keeping the inhabitants of the slum separated from the rest of the city, this wall also served to make them—and poverty with them—invisible to the eyes of the social elites:

(...) bajamos de la autopista apenas vimos la villa. Está en la parte más baja de la zona: todo va declinando hacia ella suavemente menos el nivel de vida que no declina, se despeña en los diez centímetros de la muralla, cuyo potencial publicitario la municipalidad no descuidó. Era el último espejo de los vecinos pudientes, la última protección: en vez de ver la villa se veían a sí mismos estilizados y confirmados por los afiches, en la cima del mundo con sus celulares, sus autos, sus perfumes y sus vacaciones. Una pena que tanta plenitud fuera interrumpida por las puertas mugrosas de los pobres. (Note: English: We exited the motorway as soon as we saw the shantytown. It was built on the lowest ground: everything sloped gently downwards the closer you got to it, except the quality of life, which didn't slope but rather dropped off sharply in the last few inches before the wall—a wall whose advertising potential the municipality hadn't overlooked. The wall served as a mirror for the wealthy neighbours, their last line of protection: instead of seeing the slum, they saw only themselves in the ads plastered to the wall, people on top of the world with their expensive mobile phones, cars, perfumes and holidays. Shame all those images of prosperity had to be interrupted by the grimy gates of poverty.)

The novel also sheds light on the exclusion suffered by trans women in society, via Cleopatra's story, as she only manages to overcome society's resistance to accept her gender identity when she forges the passport with which she travels to Miami and where she is finally recognized as Cleopatra Lobos. She also recounts her experiences in prostitution, a life she was pushed into because of the impossibility of getting other types of jobs, as she reveals to Qüity: ¿De qué mierda te creés que vivimos las travestis, mi amor? ¿Vos te creés que vas al aviso de secretaria que ponen en el diario y te dicen bienvenida, «señorita»? ¿Viste muchas trabajando en las empresas, vos? (Note: English: How else do you think we trannies make a living, love? You think we just show up for a secretary job advertised in the paper and they say 'Welcome aboard, madam!'? Did you ever see a queen working in an office?)

=== Popular religiosity ===
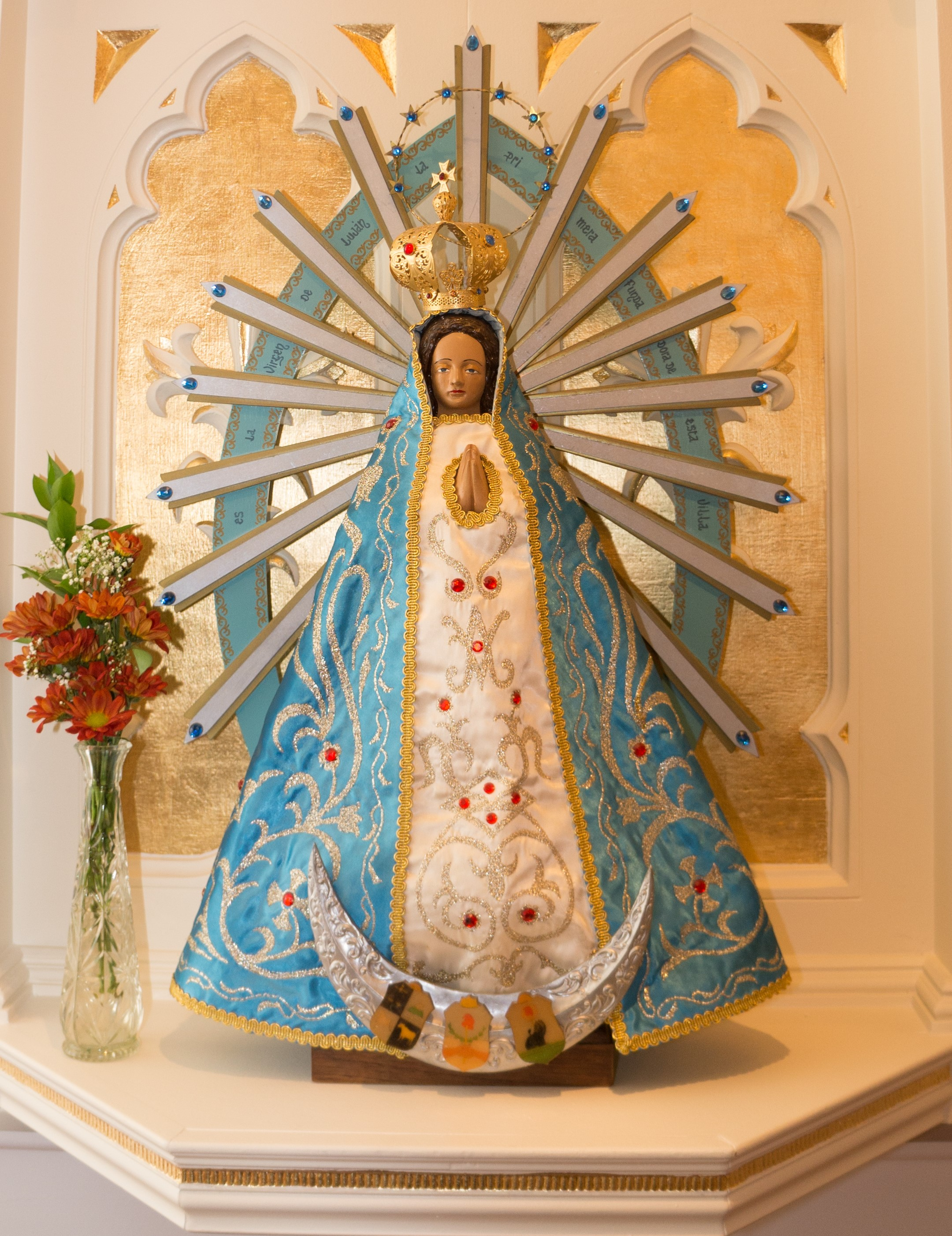
La Virgen Cabeza is compared to Our Lady of Luján in the book.

Another central theme in the novel is the role of the Christian religion in the lives of marginalized sectors. Several scenes in the book can be read as a rewriting of biblical passages, among them the arrest of Jesus at the Mount of Olives, which is reflected in La Virgen Cabeza with the destruction of El Poso. The idea of a Jesus of Nazareth who identifies with the oppressed social sectors has a long tradition in Latin America, although in the case of Cabezón Cámara, these images are demystified and shown as just another portion of the pantheon of beliefs of the slum's inhabitants, with no greater hierarchy than the rest of the popular figures, such as Eva Perón or Susana Giménez. The novel shows this influence of religion in the lives of the characters by integrating verses from the Bible into the popular parlance of El Poso. Religious references also appear in situations of extreme violence, such as in the case of a verse from the Book of Leviticus that is left as a sort of warning next to the body of a woman who has been murdered.

The figure of the Virgin Mary plays an important role in the novel. On one hand, the author seems to show in her, through parody, the negative aspects of the Catholic ideal of femininity: submissiveness, devoutness, aloofness, and stiffness. However, the fact that she is a woman in a traditional and patriarchal religion, places her as well in a position which historically marginalized people can identify with, as in the case of Cleopatra, who states in relation to the Virgin:

(...) es raro que ella, que es Virgen, me haya elegido justo a mí, que me comí más porongas que una geisha centenaria. Ella dice que no sabés lo que era pretender hablar siendo una madre judía soltera de quince años hace dos milenios. (...) un quilombo era, les parecía más tremenda que lo que les parezco yo ahora. Tal vez por eso me eligió a mí, como que se identificó conmigo porque a mí tampoco me querían dejar hablar en ningún lado (...) (Note: English: It's so weird that of all people, the Virgin would choose me, someone who's sucked more dicks than an octogenarian geisha. She says we have no idea how hard it was for her to make herself heard as a fifteen-year-old Jewish single mother two thousand years ago. (...) She caused a huge commotion, she was more scandalous back then than I am now. Maybe that's why she chose me, like she could identify with me because they wouldn't let me be heard anywhere either (...))

The appearance of the Virgin in a place like El Poso, as well as the fact that she communicated exclusively through a travesti who engaged in prostitution, also embodies the need for a guide and a new form of religiosity that can respond to the problems of excluded social groups that fail to identify with traditional creeds. As Cleopatra says:

A la Virgen le gustamos los negros, Qüity, y las negras también les gustamos y las negras travestis para mí que le gustamos el doble. (Note: English: The Virgin likes us proles, Quity, and if we're transvestites she likes us doubly much.)

=== Community and the memory of the oppressed ===
Before Cleopatra became the guide to El Poso, the slum was described as a part of los pequeños Auschwitz (Note: English: The mini-Auschwitzes) where nadie se muere de viejo sino de enfermedades curables o tiros innecesarios (Note: English: (...) no one dies of old age, they die of curable illnesses or unnecessary bullets.) However, Cleopatra's exhortations soon become the initial push that stirs in the slum's inhabitants a sense of purpose that allows them to undertake projects and achieve a higher degree of social organization. Cabezón Cámara's position on the power of the collective can be glimpsed in her description of the rapid positive changes that take place in El Poso as a product of this new sense of community, which, although initiated by Cleopatra, were in fact the result of the inhabitants coming together:

Era así, desde su centro mismo la villa irradiaba alegría. Parecía cosa de la Virgen y Cleo, pero éramos nosotros, era la fuerza de juntarnos. (Note: English: That's how it was: happiness radiated from the very heart of the slum. It might have looked like it was because of the Virgin and Cleo, but it was us, it was the power of us all coming together.)

Soon, non-governmental organizations and journalists start to arrive and talk about the sueño argentino (Note: English: Argentine dream), while the inhabitants say:

(...) cada cosa empezó a parecer parte de un plan, algo con sentido y objetivos (Note: English: (...) everything began to seem like part of a plan, something with meaning and purpose.)

However, as Qüity acknowledges, the new peace in the village does not do away with the state of vulnerability that they experienced, always with the risk that, like the fish they farmed collectively, others would come and "cast nets and devour them". This finally happens because of the ambition of the groups in power, which destroy the project of communal paradise that was emerging in El Poso, put an end to their social climbing, and make their place in society invisible.

The last point Cabezón makes is the need to record the collective history of the deprived and of those who have been made invisible. The manuscript of the novel itself is presented as Qüity's attempt to rescue the memory of the fateful events that happened in the slum, where the narrator begins to recount the events by using the first-person singular pronoun yo (Note: English: I) and then progressively beginning to use the plural nosotros (Note: English: We) instead. Cleopatra's contributions in the manuscript show how important it is for these records to include, as spokespersons for their own stories, the perspective of those who have been themselves excluded. Cleopatra sporadically corrects Qüity and demands to tell her version of the events, as she makes it clear to her at the beginning of the novel:

(...) tengo derecho a hacerme escuchar (Note: English: I have the right to make myself heard.)

== Reception ==
The book was a finalist for the Silverio Cañada Memorial Award at the Gijón Noir Week, in Gijón, Spain, for the best debut crime novel.

One of the features most celebrated by critics was the language used by Cabezón Cámara in the novel. Walter Cassara, from Argentine newspaper La Nación, compared La Virgen Cabeza to the camp aesthetic and highlighted the blend of narrative registers, which, according to Cassara, gave the novel greater expressive freedom. Spanish writer José Luis Muñoz Jimeno referred to the book as una muy buena novela, (Note: English: A very good novel) with an author who se convierte en maga de las palabras y hace que el lector participe en su juego delirante y anárquico. (Note: English: Becomes a magician with words and makes the reader take part in her delirious and anarchic game) Among the positive aspects, he highlighted the colloquial language used by Cabezón and the experimental nature of the work. Similar praise came from Mario Alberto Medrano González who, in an article in newspaper Excélsior, also emphasized, among other aspects, la capacidad de la autora al entramar el lenguaje del arrabal con el poético (Note: English: The author's ability to interweave the language of the slums with poetic language) and its nature as a reflection of the political problems of Latin America.

The English version of the novel, translated by Frances Riddle, was also very well received by critics. The review by Publishers Weekly referred to it as "mind-blowingly good" and noted the book's humor, narrative pace, and themes. In his review for newspaper Morning Star, Leo Boix said of Cabezón that she is a "brilliant social chronicler" and referred to the book as a "virtuoso debut novel." Boix made specific references to the building of characters from the Argentine underworld and praised the way in which Cabezón Cámara mixed prostitution with mafia, shanty town slang, reggaeton, and religious abuse, to create a detailed portrait of poverty and abandonment. Sam Carter, in a review for Asymptote magazine, referred to the novel as "an exploration of the alternatives posed by those who have little regard for facile categorizations or restrictive roles."

== See also ==
- Gabriela Cabezón Cámara

== Bibliography ==
- Cabezón Cámara, Gabriela (2009). La virgen cabeza (in Spanish) (1st ed.). Buenos Aires, Argentina: Eterna Cadencia Editora. ISBN 978-987-24830-7-4.
- Cabezón Cámara, Gabriela (2017). La Virgen Cabeza [Slum Virgin]. Translated by Riddle, Frances. Edinburgh, United Kingdom: Charco Press. ISBN 978-1999722708.

=== Works cited ===
- Adur Nobile, Lucas Martín (2018). "Vírgenes cabeza y cristos villeros: Reescrituras marginales del discurso católico en las obras de Leonardo Oyola y Gabriela Cabezón Cámara". Tropelías: Revista de teoría de la literatura y literatura comparada (in Spanish). 2018 (3). Aragon, Spain: University of Zaragoza: 36–56. doi:10.26754/ojs_tropelias/tropelias.201832626. ISSN 1132-2373.
- Castro Rodas, Juan Pablo (2017). "Antología disidente". Cuerpo y mirada: Antología del cuerpo disidente en la novela latinoamericana contemporánea (PDF) (PhD in Latin American literature thesis) (in Spanish). Quito, Ecuador: Simón Bolívar Andean University. pp. 237–251. hdl:10644/6194.
- Maradei, Guadalupe (2018). "Ficciones posdictadura: la trilogía oscura de Gabriela Cabezón Cámara". In Ingenschay, Dieter (ed.). Eventos del deseo: sexualidades minoritarias en las culturas/literaturas de España y Latinoamérica a finales del siglo XX (in Spanish). Madrid-Frankfurt: Iberoamericana-Veuvert. pp. 123–140. ISBN 978-84-16922-71-0.
- Marguch, Juan Francisco (1 August 2013). "Coger y comer. Dos economías de lo común en La virgen cabeza de Gabriela Cabezón Cámara" (PDF). Lectures du Genre (in Spanish). 2013 (10: Estudios «queer» y literatura): 93–101. ISSN 1958-5136.
- Martínez Gil, Juan (November 2018). "El devenir queer de Cleopatra en La Virgen Cabeza de Gabriela Cabezón Cámara". Clepsydra: Revista de Estudios de Género y Teoría Feminista (in Spanish). 2018 (17). Tenerife, Spain: University of La Laguna: 11–26. doi:10.25145/j.clepsydra.2018.17.01. ISSN 1579-7902.
- Ponze, Adrián Alberto (January–June 2017). "La Virgen Cabeza: las voces de la villa y de las diversidades sexuales". ANTARES: Letras e Humanidades (in Spanish). 9 (17). Rio Grande do Sul, Brazil: University of Caxias do Sul: 32–49. ISSN 1984-4921. Archived from the original on 2020-05-31.
- Roncato, Sara (27 February 2015). Narrativa argentina contemporánea: el relato del margen-centro en Gabriela Cabezón Cámara e Iosi Havilio (PDF) (Master's degree in European, American, and post-colonial language and literature thesis) (in Spanish). Venice, Italy: Università Ca' Foscari Venezia.
- Solari, Elisa (2016). "4: Estudios literarios". In Peliza, María Marta; Picallo, Ximena; Sayago, Sebastián (eds.). Literatura-Lingüística: Investigaciones en la Patagonia IX (PDF) (in Spanish). Comodoro Rivadavia, Argentina: Editorial Universitaria de la Patagonia (EDUPA). pp. 312–316. ISBN 978-987-1937-72-1. Archived from the original on 2020-11-20.
- Tozzi, Liliana (4–6 October 2012). De villas y paraísos perdidos. Memoria y literatura en La Virgen Cabeza (2009) de Gabriela Cabezón Cámara (PDF). V Seminario Internacional Políticas de la Memoria. Arte y memoria. Miradas sobre el pasado reciente (in Spanish). Buenos Aires, Argentina: Centro Cultural de la Memoria Haroldo Conti.
- Vazquez, Michel (2016). "4: Estudios literarios". In Peliza, María Marta; Picallo, Ximena; Sayago, Sebastián (eds.). Literatura-Lingüística: Investigaciones en la Patagonia IX (PDF) (in Spanish). Comodoro Rivadavia, Argentina: Editorial Universitaria de la Patagonia (EDUPA). pp. 331–334. ISBN 978-987-1937-72-1. Archived from the original on 2020-11-20.
