= The Adventures of China Iron =

2017 novel by Gabriela Cabezón Cámara

- Spanish book cover
- Author: Gabriela Cabezón Cámara
- Original title: Las aventuras de la China Iron
- Translator: Iona Macintyre & Fiona Mackintosh
- Language: Spanish
- Genre: gauchesco, revisionism
- Publisher: Penguin Random House (Spanish original), Charco Press (English translation)
- Publication date: 2017
- English publication date: 2019
- ISBN: 9789873987793

The Adventures of China Iron (Spanish: Las aventuras de la China Iron) is a 2017 novel by Argentine author Gabriela Cabezón Cámara. It is a reimagining of the Argentine epic poem Martín Fierro from the point of view of his wife, an originally nameless character. The novel received positive reviews; the English translation by Iona Macintyre and Fiona Mackintosh was shortlisted for the 2020 International Booker Prize.

== Synopsis ==
An abused and mistreated orphan is lost in a bet to Martín Fierro and becomes his wife. By 14, she has already given birth to two sons. After Martín Fierro is conscripted to serve on the frontier, the girl leaves her village and children, taking only her dog, Estreya. She joins a Scottish-English adventurer, Elizabeth, who is searching for her husband and the land they bought together. The girl introduces herself as "China", a Quechua word simply meaning "woman"; Liz insists on giving her a name of her own, and the girl gives herself the name China Josephine Star Iron – Star, based on Estreya's name, and Iron, based on the name of her husband. On their travels, Liz teaches Josephine to read, dresses her as a boy, and tells of her own travels. They meet an arriero, Rosario, who travels with them to the pampas.

They arrive at a fortress, where they meet Hernández (based on the author of the original Martín Fierro, José Hernández), a colonel who steals Martín Fierro's story and claims it as his own. Liz and Josephine begin a sexual relationship. Ultimately they arrive at an indigenous community where they find their husbands; they stay there to live. Josephine takes a new lover and chooses her final name of Tararira.

== Analysis ==
Cabezón, while reading gauchescos, realized that gaucho literature was never from the point of view of a woman, and so decided to write a gauchesco from the point of view of a woman. Since Martín Fierro is one of the most well-known works of Argentine literature, she decided her protagonist would be his wife, but wanted the story to be distinct from Martín Fierro's story. Laura Fandiño, writing for Hispanófila, compares this centering of women's perspectives to other Argentine texts such as Río de las congujas by Libertad Demitrópulos and La señora Macbeth by Griselda Gambaro. China Iron is often in a direct dialogue with the original poem – for instance, one chapter's title, "La China is not a name", is a direct response to the original Martín Fierro poem, where Fierro's wife does not receive a name beyond "La China". The name Josephine, the feminine version of José, also makes reference to the author of Martín Fierro, José Hernandez; according to Cabezón, her name is also a reference to Argentine literary critic Josefina Ludmer, who wrote a book analyzing the gauchesco genre. Fandiño comments that China Iron uses the literary canon formed by males and historically exclusive of females to create a space for females.

The novel has also been noted for its queer interpretation of Martín Fierro. Liz and Josephine (who cross-dresses for part of the book) begin a sexual relationship together, while Fierro himself dresses as a woman and has a sexual relationship with another man, Cruz; the male Rosario is called "Rosa" for most of the book and likewise also crossdresses and has relations with the same sex.

=== Colonialism ===
José Pablo Negroni writes that Liz and Josephine's sexual relationship can be understood as an allegory for colonialism, as Liz, a white visitor from Britain, "invades" Josephine, an Argentine girl, and that Josephine, who is still young and able to be "molded", represents Argentina at this point of time in history. Barbara Jaroszuk argues that the representation of indigenous people in the work presents them as representatives of a more just and beautiful world, and parodies earlier Argentine works that presented indigenous people in a negative manner. Ignacio Sánchez Osores, writing for the Revista de Crítica Literaria Latinoamericana, comments that Josephine's journey is a change of perspective: she begins only seeing the need to colonize the lands for the sake of progress and modernization; but learns to see the consequences of colonialism and ultimately rejects it when she integrates into an indigenous community.

== Reception ==
Reviews were largely positive, praising the prose and translation.

The Guardian praised China Iron as a "thrilling and mystical miniature epic". Madison Felman-Panagotacos of the Los Angeles Review of Books praised the book for its centering of women and indigenous peoples in the narrative and for its criticism of the gaucho identity. The New York Times praised the prose and the translation. José Pablo Negroni praised Macintyre and Mackintosh for their translation, calling their work "some of the most exciting work in the field of literary translation". The translation was shortlisted for the 2020 International Booker Prize.

Spanish newspaper El País named it one of the best Latin American novels of 2017. BBC News named it one of the best Spanish-language novels of the 21st century.

The novel is part of the curriculum of several schools in Argentina; due to its explicit sexual scenes, it was one of several books to be challenged, alongside Cometierra by Dolores Reyes, Las primas by Aurora Venturini, and Si no fueras tan niña by Sol Fantin.
