= Grupo Editorial Norma =

Colombian book publishing company

Grupo Editorial Norma is a book publishing company based in Colombia. It also operates several web portals.

Founded in 1960, Grupo Editorial Norma today operates in most Latin American countries and in Spain where it owns several publishing houses. Grupo Editorial Norma is part of Carvajal Educacion, that is a section of the international company Carvajal S.A.

== Book series ==
- Abra Palabra (English, "open word")
- Biografías y Documentos (English, "biographies and documents")
- Cara y Cruz (English, "heads and tails")
- Educación y Formación Familiar (English, "education and family training")
- Hierbas & Especies (English, "herbs and spices")
- Literatura Mondadori (English, "Modadori literature")
- Literatura o Muerte: Novela Negra (English, "literature or death: black novel")
- Milenio (English, "millennium")
- La Otra Orilla (English, "the other side")
- Verticales de Bolsillo (English, "pocket verticals")
- Vitral (English, "stained glass")
- Zona Libre (English, "free zone")

== Imprints ==
- Norma Educación
- Kapelusz Editora (Argentina)
- Editorial Farben (Costa Rica)
- Norma Libros (entertainment and information book markets)
- Parramón Ediciones (Spain)
- Granica (Spain)
- Belacqva (Spain)
