= Nick Caistor =

British translator and journalist

Nick Caistor (born 15 July 1946) is a British translator and journalist, best known for his translations of Spanish, French, and Portuguese literature. He is a past winner of the Valle-Inclán Prize for translation. He is a regular contributor to BBC Radio 4, the BBC World Service, The Times Literary Supplement, and The Guardian. He lives in Norwich, and is married to fellow translator Amanda Hopkinson, with whom he frequently collaborates in his translation work.

== As translator ==
- Luis Gutiérrez Maluenda, Music for the Dead
- César Aira, The Hare
- Roberto Arlt, The Seven Madmen
- Dulce Chacón, The Sleeping Voice
- Paulo Coelho, The Devil and Miss Prym (with Amanda Hopkinson)
- Edgardo Cozarinsky, The Bride from Odessa
- Edgardo Cozarinsky, The Moldavian Pimp
- Rolo Diez, Tequila Blue
- Eugenio Dittborn, Mapa: Airmail Paintings (with Claudia Rousseau)
- Carlos María Domínguez, The House of Paper (with Peter Sis)
- Ildefonso Falcones, Cathedral of the Sea
- Rodolfo Fogwill, Malvinas Requiem
- Alicia Gimenez-Bartlett, Dog Day
- Alicia Gimenez-Bartlett, Prime Time Suspect
- Martín Kohan, Seconds Out
- Martín Kohan, School For Patriots
- Pedro Mairal, The Missing Year of Juan Salvatierra
- Juan Marsé, Shanghai Nights
- Alberto Méndez, Blind Sunflowers
- Eduardo Mendoza, A Light Comedy
- Eduardo Mendoza, An Englishman in Madrid
- Eduardo Mendoza, The Year of the Flood
- Eduardo Mendoza, The Mystery of the Enchanted Crypt
- Eduardo Mendoza, No Word from Gurb
- Andrés Neuman, Talking to Ourselves
- Andrés Neuman, Traveler of the Century (with Lorenza Garcia)
- Juan Carlos Onetti, The Shipyard
- Guillermo Orsi, No-one Loves a Policeman
- Guillermo Orsi, Holy City
- Hernando Calvo Ospina, ¡Salsa!: Havana Heat, Bronx Beat
- Isabel Allende, The Japanese Lover
- Isabel Allende, In the Midst of Winter
- Félix J. Palma, The Map of Time
- Félix J. Palma, The Map of the Sky
- Alan Pauls, The Past
- Napoleón Baccino Ponce de León, Five Black Ships: A Novel of the Discoverers
- Carmen Posadas, Child's Play (with Amanda Hopkinson)
- Julián Ríos, Procession of Shadows
- Alonso Salazar, Born to Die in Medellín (with introduction by Colin Harding)
- Carolina Sanín, The Children
- José Saramago, Journey to Portugal (with Amanda Hopkinson)
- Lorenzo Silva, The Faint-Hearted Bolshevik (with Isabelle Kaufeler)
- Dominique Sylvain, The Dark Angel: A Diesel and Jost Investigation
- Valérie Tasso, Insatiable: The Erotic Adventures Of A French Girl In Spain
- Manuel Vázquez Montalbán, The Buenos Aires Quintet (Pepe Carvalho Mysteries)
- Manuel Vázquez Montalbán, Tattoo
- Manuel Vázquez Montalbán, The Man of My Life
- Pedro Zarraluki, The History of Silence

== As author, co-author, or editor ==
- Mexico (DK Eyewitness Travel Guides) (with Maria Doulton and Petra Fischer)
- Che Guevara: A Life
- The Rainstick Pack (Sacred Earth Series)
- The World in View: Spain
- The World in View: Argentina
- The World in View: Israel
- Picking Up the Pieces: Corruption and Democracy in Peru (LAB Short Books) (with Susana Villaran)
- Columbus's Egg: New Latin American Stories on the Conquest (editor)
- Fidel Castro (Critical Lives)
- Buenos Aires
- Mexico City: A Cultural and Literary Companion (Cities of the Imagination)
- Chile in Focus: A Guide to the People, Politics and Culture
- Argentina in Focus: A Guide to the People, Politics and Culture
- The Faber Book of Contemporary Latin American Short Stories (editor)
- Nicaragua in Focus: A Guide to the People, Politics and Culture (with Hazel Plunkett)
