= A Long Petal of the Sea =

2019 novel by Isabel Allende

- First edition (Plaza & Janés)
- Author: Isabel Allende
- Original title: Largo pétalo de mar
- Translator: Nick Caistor; Amanda Hopkinson
- Language: Spanish
- Genre: Historical fiction
- Publisher: Plaza & Janés
- Publication date: 2019
- Publication place: Spain
- English publication date: 2020
- Media type: Print (hardback & paperback)
- Pages: 384
- ISBN: 978-1-9848-9916-3 (hardback)
- LC Class: PQ8098.1.L54 L36 2019
- Preceded by: In the Midst of Winter
- Followed by: Violeta

A Long Petal of the Sea (Spanish: Largo pétalo de mar) is a 2019 novel by Chilean author Isabel Allende. Originally published in Spain by Plaza & Janés, it was first published in the United States by Vintage Espanol. The novel was issued in 2019 in Spanish as Largo pétalo de mar, and was translated into English by Nick Caistor and Amanda Hopkinson. Told through fictional characters in the context of real historical events, the story takes place partly during the Spanish Civil War and partly in Chile where the protagonists again witness the fight between freedom and repression. A Long Petal of the Sea became the most popular book in Spain between April 2019 and April 2020.

== Plot ==
During the Spanish Civil War in Barcelona, Victor Dalmau has left his medical studies to help the Republicans against the Fascist forces of General Franco. During the Battle of Teruel his leg gets wounded. Victor's brother, Guillem, is also a Republican soldier, but he dies in the Battle of the Ebro.

Victor seeks the help of his Basque friend, Aitor Ibarra, to send his mother Carme and Guillem's wife, Roser, to France during La Retirada, as the victory of Franco's forces is becoming more and more certain. Carme, believing she will burden her family's future prospects in France, disappears before leaving Spain. Roser is pregnant with Guillem's child, and after finding asylum in France, gives birth to a boy named Marcel, after Guillem and Victor's father.

After many trials, Victor reunites with Roser in France and reveals that Guillem has died. They hear that Winnipeg, a ship chartered by the poet Pablo Neruda, is going to take a certain number of Spanish refugees to Chile. Desperate to grab the chance, Victor and Roser get married reluctantly to qualify for the journey. They embark on this journey, but migration to the new country is not the end of their problem.

In 1939 businessman Isidro and his wife Laura Del Solar travel from Chile to Liverpool on the MV Reina del Pacifico. Back in Chile their daughter Ofelia, who is engaged to Matías Eyzaguirre, starts an affair with Victor. She gives birth to a baby, but they tell her it was stillborn.

In 1966 Salvador Allende is elected president, but his government is overthrown during the 1973 Chilean coup d'état. The people who emigrated from Spain to Chile get the feeling that they are in a neverending war.

In 1990 Pinochet steps down as president, so the democracy in Chile can be restored. Victor receives an unexpected visit by Ingrid Schnake, who explains that she is the daughter of him and Ofelia. She was not stillborn, but adopted.

== Characters ==
- Victor Dalmau: Spanish doctor, republican in the Spanish Civil War
- Guillem Dalmau: Victor's brother, dies in the Battle of the Ebro
- Marcel Dalmau, Sr.: Victor's father, music professor
- Carme Dalmau: Victor's mother
- Marcel Dalmau, Jr.: Son of Guillem and Roser
- Roser Bruguera: Guillem's wife, musician
- Elisabeth Eidenbenz: nurse from Madrid who works in Teruel
- Aitor Ibarra: Basque ambulance driver, friend of Victor
- Isidro del Solar: businessman from Santiago
- Laura del Solar: Isidro's wife
- Felipe del Solar: Isidro's eldest son, lawyer
- Ofelia del Solar: Isidro's youngest daughter, painter
- Leonardo del Solar: Isidro's youngest son
- Matías Eyzaguirre: Ofelia's fiancé
- Juana Nancucheo: Isidro's housekeeper of mixed descent
- Vicente Urbina: Catholic priest
- Ingrid Schnake: daughter of Victor and Ofelia, adopted

Several historical people from Chile or Spain appear as minor characters:

- Pablo Neruda
- Salvador Allende
- Augusto Pinochet
- Francisco Franco
- Dolores Ibárruri

== Reception ==
Marcela Davison Avilés of NPR admires the "gifted stories" of Allende, noting that "A Long Petal of the Sea is a love story for these times. But it's not a story beholden to any era. Its call is immutable, like Neruda's hope". The Observer praises the skill with which Allende tells a story of "displacement", "a theme sharpened by her own life story". In her review for The New York Times, Paula McLain highlights the themes of this novel: "there is the sense that every human life is an odyssey, and that how and where we connect creates the fabric of our existence: the source of our humanity". Kirkus Reviews praises Allende's storytelling skill: "Allende tends to describe emotions and events rather than delve into them, and she paints the historical backdrop in very broad strokes, but she is an engaging storyteller".
