= Magda Bogin =

American novelist

Magda Bogin (born 1950) is a New York-based writer and literary translator who has produced a body of work that straddles fiction, poetry, opera and non-fiction. Born in Manhattan, she has lived and worked extensively in Mexico, France, Italy and Russia.

The recipient of numerous grants and awards, most recently as a librettist in residence with American Lyric Theater in New York, she has taught writing at Columbia University, Princeton, and the City College of New York. She is the founder and director of Under the Volcano, a program of writing master classes that convenes every January in Mexico, and offers online workshops for writers with works in progress.

== Selected bibliography ==
- The Women Troubadours (1976)
- (Translator) The House of the Spirits by Isabel Allende (1985)
- (Translator and editor with Cecilia Vicuna) The Selected Poems of Rosario Castellanos (1988)
- (Translator and editor) Selected Poems of Salvador Espriu (1989)
- (Translator and editor) Don Quixote by Miguel de Cervantes Saavedra (1991)
- Natalya, God's Messenger (1994)
