= Federico de Arce =

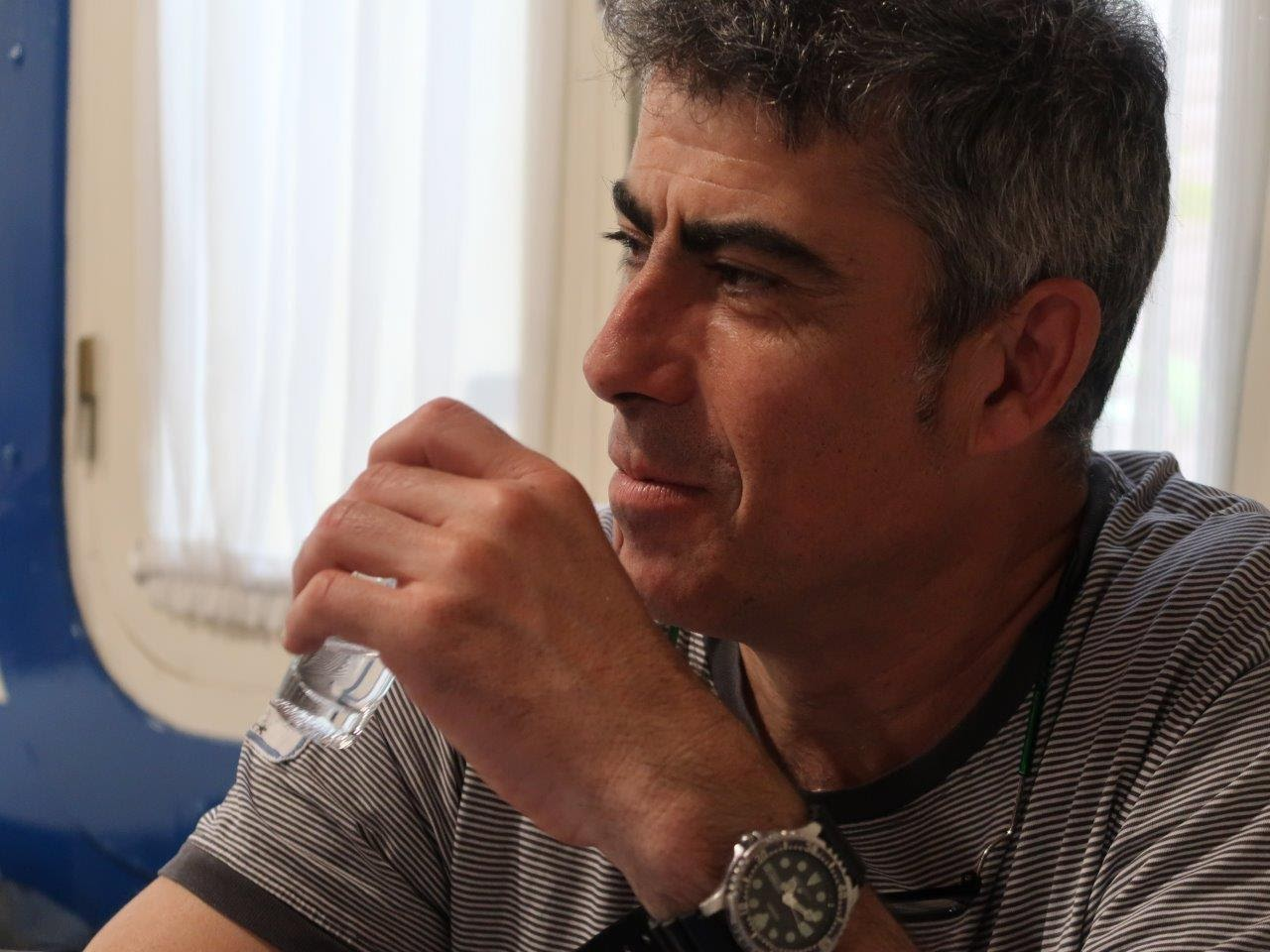
- Born: April 16, 1968 (age 58); Cieza, Spain
- Other names: José Luis de la Bodega, Anna y Hans Schliemann, Abraham Abravanel, Hu Zi
- Occupations: Writer; Literature professor
- Awards: First prize, Dulce Chacón Literary Award (2005)

Federico de Arce (born 16 April 1968 in Cieza, Murcia) is a Spanish writer and literature professor based in Toledo, where he has developed most of his professional career and literary work. He writes under his own name as well as under several heteronyms, most notably José Luis de la Bodega, Anna y Hans Schliemann, Abraham Abravanel, and the Chinese poet Hu Zi.

In 2005 he won first prize in the second edition of the Dulce Chacón Literary Award for his short story Piratas.

Since 2019 he has coordinated the international poetry collection "Ultramarina" for Mochuelo Libros, a series of anthologies of Spanish and Spanish-American poets selected by the poets themselves.

He also directs the eclectic poetry collection "Entre las voces" for Editorial Gato Encerrado.

== Works ==
=== Fiction ===
- ¿Por que no hay una Hofbrauhaus en Toledo?. Toledo, Caja Castilla-La Mancha, 1997.
- La voz de El Shaday. Toledo, Descrito ediciones, 2014. ISBN 9788494131233
- La vieja. Toledo, Descrito ediciones, 2015. ISBN 9788494131271

=== Poetry ===
- En casa de huespedes (fragment). In El signo del gorrion, no. 19, p. 172. Leon, Trotta, 2000.
- Miel de Brujas. Descrito ediciones, 2009 (digital edition, 2016). ISBN 9788494551925
- Aguas arriba de mi madre. Madrid, Amargord, 2016. ISBN 9788416762286
- Alma de cantaro. Madrid, Huerga & Fierro, 2017. ISBN 9788494779855
- Un mal espanol. Madrid/Buenos Aires, Mochuelo libros, 2019. ISBN 9788494989506
- Jugando a las casitas con Emily Dickinson: aletria. Toledo, Mochuelo libros, 2020. ISBN 9788494989568
- El guardian de la voz. Toledo, Gato Encerrado, 2021. ISBN 9788494613289
- El sexo no es la herida de Dios. Madrid, Los Libros del Mississippi, 2024. ISBN 9788412824230

=== Essay ===
- El narrador y sus demonios: Cervantes, Kafka, Borges. Santiago de Chile, Ril editores, 2025. ISBN 9788410248366
- Dulce Chacon, la mujer arana. In En uno de los valles del Rio Blanco. Valencia, Trashumantes, 2008. ISBN 9788493658236
- Alberto Sanchez, in El pueblo espanol tiene un camino que conduce a una estrella. Descrito Ediciones, 2017. ISBN 9788494772405

=== Translations ===
- La ceniza del instante. Poesia esencial / Salah Al Hamdani; translated by Fuensanta Alonso and Federico de Arce. Madrid, Huerga & Fierro, 2023. ISBN 9788412693881

== Awards ==
- First prize, Dulce Chacon Literary Award (2005)
- The rock opera Pleased to meet you, written and directed by De Arce, earned the Instituto de Educacion Secundaria Sefarad of Toledo the Premio Nacional CREARTE 2009, awarded by the Spanish Ministry of Culture.
