= Andrés Neuman =

Argentine writer (born 1977)

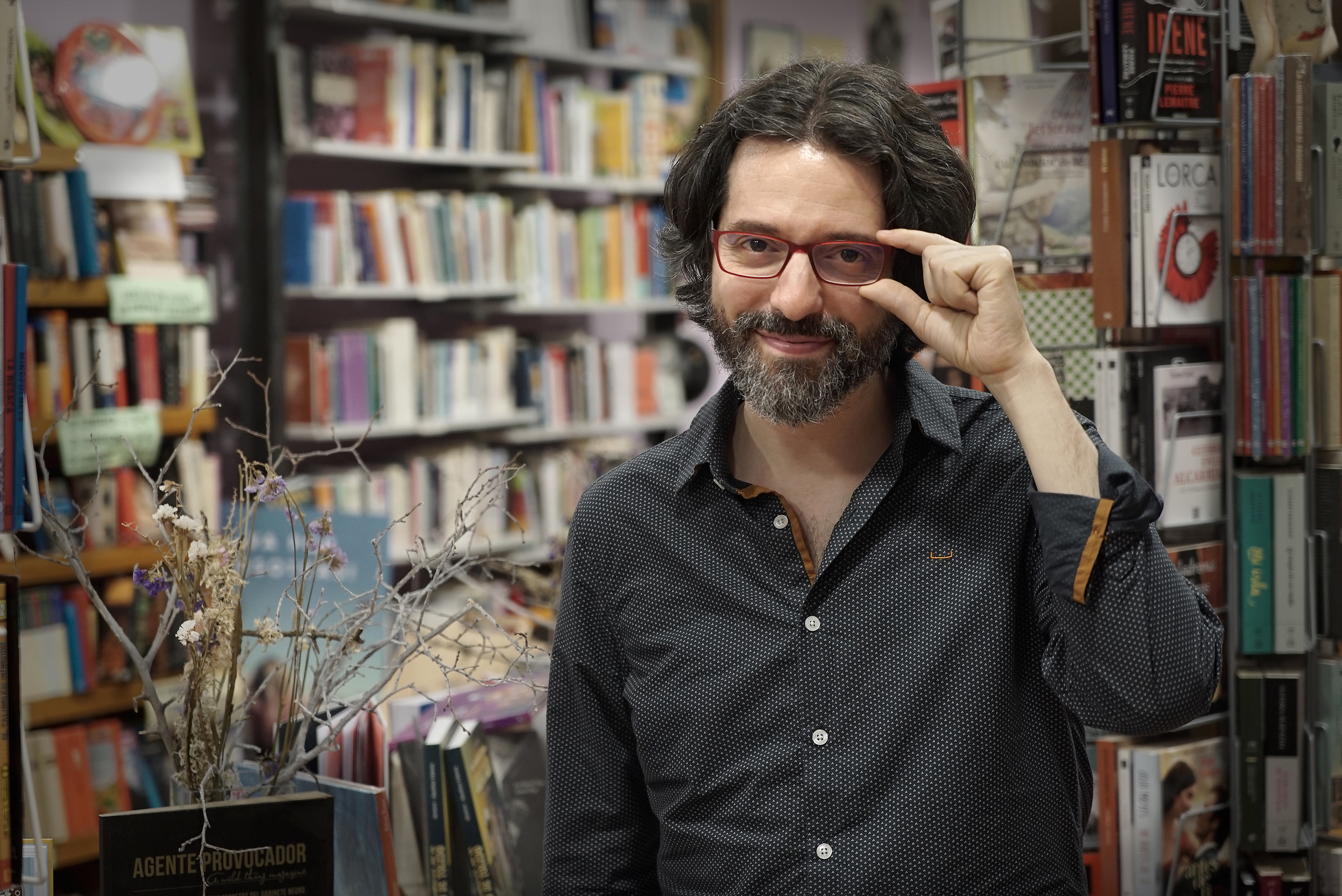
Andrés Neuman portrayed at an independent bookstore in Madrid, Spain

Andrés Neuman (born 28 January 1977) is an Argentine writer, poet, translator, columnist and blogger.

== Early life and education ==
The son of Argentine émigré musicians, he was born in Buenos Aires, Argentina, to a mother of French and Spanish descent and a father of Eastern European-Jewish descent. He spent his childhood in Buenos Aires, before going into exile with his family to Granada, Spain. The stories of his European ancestors and family migrations, his childhood recollections and the kidnapping of his paternal aunt during the military dictatorship can be read in his novel Una vez Argentina. He has a degree in Spanish Philology from the University of Granada, where he also taught Latin American literature. He holds both Argentine and Spanish citizenship.

== Career ==
Through a vote called by the Hay Festival, Neuman was selected among the most outstanding young Latin American authors, being included on the first Bogotá39 list. He was also selected by Granta magazine in Spanish and English as one of the 22 Best of Young Spanish-Language Novelists.

His fourth novel, the award-winning Traveller of the Century, first to be published in English, was selected among the best books of the year by The Guardian, and Financial Times. This novel was also shortlisted for the Independent Foreign Fiction Prize, achieving a Special Commendation from the jury; as well as shortlisted for the International Dublin Literary Award, being named one of "the two frontrunners who so sure-footedly outpaced the strong pack", according to an article written by the jury for The Guardian.

His next novel translated into English was Talking to Ourselves, described by The New York Times as "a contemporary family drama and unflinching story of grief" as well as "a literary adventure", was longlisted for the Best Translated Book Award, shortlisted for the Oxford-Weidenfeld Translation Prize, and selected as number 1 among the Top 20 books of the year by Typographical Era. His collection of stories The Things We Don't Do was longlisted for the Best Translated Book Award and won the CLMP Firecracker Award for fiction, given by the Community of Literary Magazines and Presses with the American Booksellers Association. He is also the author of a travel book about Latin America, How to Travel without Seeing: Dispatches from the New Latin America.

His latest novel, Fracture, "filled with insights into cross-cultural intimacies" according to The New Yorker and "a moving examination of love and human relationships in the face of calamity" according to the Washington Independent Review of Books, was longlisted for the Premio Gregor von Rezzori in Italy, shortlisted for the Premio Dulce Chacón and the Premio San Clemente in Spain, and selected by El Mundo as one of the five best novels of the year in the Spanish language as well as one of the books of the year through a poll among critics, journalists and booksellers by El País. It was published in English by Farrar, Straus and Giroux in the US and Granta in the UK.

These translations were followed by his "gloriously pungent debut novel", Bariloche, named a best book of the year by Southwest Review, World Literature Today and Publishers Weekly; and the selected poems Love Training, spanning two decades of poetry in a single unified collection, the first volume to make his poems available in English, longlisted for the PEN Award for Poetry in Translation. Neuman's two most recent titles published in English are the family novel Once Upon Argentina, one of the Notable Translations of the year, "a dazzling kaleidoscopic account of his personal and familial history (...) with a pitch-perfect balance of the light and the serious" which "transcends the personal and reaches the universal"; and the praise of noncanonical bodies Sensitive Anatomy, composed of "thirty short meditations (...) not meant to discount either its quality or substance but simply to acknowledge both his prolific output and febrile imagination", delivering a "forceful pushback against prejudices".

In one of the essays of his book Entre paréntesis (Between Parentheses), the Chilean writer Roberto Bolaño stated about Neuman: "He has a gift. No good reader will fail to perceive in these pages something that can only be found in great literature, that which is written by true poets. The literature of the twenty-first century will belong to Neuman and to a handful of his blood siblings".

== Awards and honours ==
- 1998 Antonio Carvajal Young Poetry Prize for his first collection of poems, Métodos de la noche.
- 1999 Federico García Lorca Poetry Prize for Alfileres de luz.
- 1999 First Finalist in the Premio Herralde for his first novel, Bariloche, which was selected as one of the best ten novels of the year by El Cultural, the literary supplement of the national newspaper El Mundo.
- 2002 Hiperión Prize for his poetry collection, El tobogán (2002)
- 2003 First Finalist in the Premio Herralde for his third novel, Una vez Argentina.
- 2009 Alfaguara Prize for his fourth novel, El viajero del siglo (Traveller of the Century, 2009). This book was selected as one of the five best novels of the year published in Spanish language, in two different votes: one called by the national newspaper El País among 50 critics and journalists and another one called by the national newspaper El Mundo
- 2009 National Critics Prize: Premio de la Crítica Española for El viajero del siglo (Traveler of the Century).
- 2013 Independent Foreign Fiction Prize shortlist for Traveller of the Century (Nick Caistor & Lorenza Garcia; Spanish; Pushkin Press).
- 2013 Special Commendation from the Jury of the Independent Foreign Fiction Prize for Traveller of the Century.
- 2013 Best Translated Book Award longlist for Traveler of the Century.
- 2014 International Dublin Literary Award shortlist for Traveller of the Century (Nick Caistor & Lorenza Garcia; Spanish; Pushkin Press and Farrar, Straus and Giroux).
- 2014 Puterbaugh Fellow
- 2015 Best Translated Book Award longlist for his fifth novel, Talking to Ourselves.
- 2015 Oxford-Weidenfeld Translation Prize shortlist for Talking to Ourselves.
- 2016 International Dublin Literary Award longlist for Talking to Ourselves (Nick Caistor & Lorenza Garcia; Spanish; Pushkin Press and Farrar, Straus and Giroux).
- 2016 Best Translated Book Award longlist for The Things We Don't Do.
- 2016 Firecracker Award for The Things We Don't Do.
- 2018 Premio Dulce Chacón shortlist for his sixth novel, Fractura. This book was also selected as one of the Books of the Year by El País, through a vote by critics, journalists and booksellers.
- 2019 Premio San Clemente Rosalía-Abanca shortlist for Fractura.
- 2020 Premio Gregor von Rezzori longlist for Fractura
- 2024 PEN Award for Poetry in Translation longlist for Love Training (Robin Myers; Spanish; Deep Vellum).

== List of works ==
Novels

- Bariloche (1999). Barcelona: Anagrama. ISBN 84-339-2444-3. Paperback edition, 2008, ISBN 978-84-339-7314-6. First Finalist in the Herralde Prize.
- La vida en las ventanas (2002). Madrid: Espasa-Calpe. ISBN 84-670-0127-5. First Finalist in the Primavera Prize.
- Una vez Argentina (2003). Barcelona: Anagrama. ISBN 84-339-6853-X. First Finalist in the Herralde Prize. New rewritten and expanded edition: Una vez Argentina (2014). Madrid: Alfaguara. ISBN 978-84-204-1801-8.
- El viajero del siglo (2009) (Traveller of the Century). Madrid: Alfaguara. ISBN 978-84-204-2235-0. Winner of Alfaguara Prize and National Critics Prize.
- Hablar solos (2012) (Talking to Ourselves). Madrid: Alfaguara. ISBN 978-84-204-0329-8.
- Fractura (2018). Madrid: Alfaguara. ISBN 978-84-204-3292-2.
- Umbilical (2022). Madrid: Alfaguara. ISBN 978-84-204-6269-1.
- Pequeño hablante (2024). Madrid: Alfaguara. ISBN 978-84-204-7756-5.
- Hasta que empieza a brillar. (2025). Madrid: Alfaguara. ISBN 9788410496279 (296 páginas). (A novel about the librarian and lexicographer María Moliner).

Poetry

- Métodos de la noche (1998). Madrid: Ediciones Hiperión. ISBN 84-7517-617-8. Antonio Carvajal Young Poetry Prize.
- El jugador de billar (2000). Valencia: Editorial Pre-Textos. ISBN 84-8191-353-7.
- El tobogán (2002). Madrid: Ediciones Hiperión. ISBN 84-7517-727-1. Hiperión Poetry Prize.
- Mística abajo (2008). Barcelona: Editorial Acantilado. ISBN 978-84-96834-40-8.
- Década. Poesía 1997-2007 (2008). Barcelona: Editorial Acantilado. ISBN 978-84-96834-82-8.
- No sé por qué y Patio de locos (2013). Valencia: Editorial Pre-Textos. 978-84-15576-47-1.
- Vivir de oído (2018). Madrid: La Bella Varsovia. ISBN 978-84-94-8007-8-8.
- Isla con madre (2023). Madrid: La Bella Varsovia. ISBN 978-84-339-1926-7.

Short stories

- El que espera (2000). Barcelona: Anagrama. ISBN 84-339-2461-3.
- El último minuto (2001). Madrid: Espasa. ISBN 84-239-2623-0. New edition by Páginas de Espuma (Madrid, 2007, ISBN 978-84-8393-001-4).
- Alumbramiento (2006). Madrid: Páginas de Espuma. ISBN 84-95642-85-9.
- Hacerse el muerto (2011). Madrid: Páginas de Espuma. ISBN 978-84-8393-066-3.

Others

- Die Winterreise of Wilhelm Müller (2003) (Viaje de invierno, Winter Journey translation from German to Spanish). Barcelona: Editorial Acantilado. ISBN 84-96136-23-X.
- El equilibrista (2005). Barcelona: Editorial Acantilado. ISBN 84-96489-07-8.
- Cómo viajar sin ver. Latinoamérica en tránsito (2010) (How to Travel Without Seeing. Latin America in Transit, travel book). Madrid: Alfaguara. ISBN 978-84-204-0608-4.
- Caso de duda (2016). Granada: Cuadernos del Vigía. ISBN 978-84-95430-58-8.
- Anatomía sensible (2019). Madrid: Páginas de Espuma. ISBN 978-84-8393-265-0

== English translations ==
- — (2012). Traveller of the Century. Translated by Nick Caistor; Lorenza García. UK: Pushkin Press. ISBN 978-1906548667.
- — (2012). Traveller of the Century. Translated by Nick Caistor; Lorenza García. US: Farrar, Straus and Giroux. ISBN 978-0374119393.
- — (2014). Talking to Ourselves. Translated by Nick Caistor; Lorenza García. UK: Pushkin Press. ISBN 978-1782270553.
- — (2014). Talking to Ourselves. Translated by Nick Caistor; Lorenza García. US: Farrar, Straus and Giroux. ISBN 978-0374167530.
- — (2014). The Things We Don't Do. Translated by Nick Caistor; Lorenza García. UK: Pushkin Press. ISBN 978-1782270737.
- — (2015). The Things We Don't Do. Translated by Nick Caistor; Lorenza García. US: Open Letter Books. ISBN 978-1-940953-18-2.
- — (2016). How to Travel without Seeing: Dispatches from the New Latin America. Translated by Jeffrey Lawrence. US: Restless Books. ISBN 978-1632060556.
- — (2020). Fracture. Translated by Nick Caistor; Lorenza García. US: Farrar, Straus and Giroux. ISBN 978-0374158231.
- — (2020). Fracture. Translated by Nick Caistor; Lorenza García. UK: Granta. ISBN 978-1783785131.
- — (2023). Bariloche. Translated by Robin Myers. US: Open Letter. ISBN 978-1-948830-62-1.
- — (2023). Love Training (Selected Poems 2000-2020). Translated by Robin Myers. US: Deep Vellum/ Phoneme Media. ISBN 9781646052684.
- — (2024). Once Upon Argentina. Translated by Nick Caistor; Lorenza García. US: Open Letter. ISBN 978-1-960385-11-6.
- — (2024). Sensitive Anatomy. Translated by Nick Caistor; Lorenza García. US: Open Letter. ISBN 978-1-960385-02-4.
- — (2025). A Father is Born. Translated by Robin Myers. US: Open Letter. ISBN 978-1-960385-41-3.
