= Della Davidson =

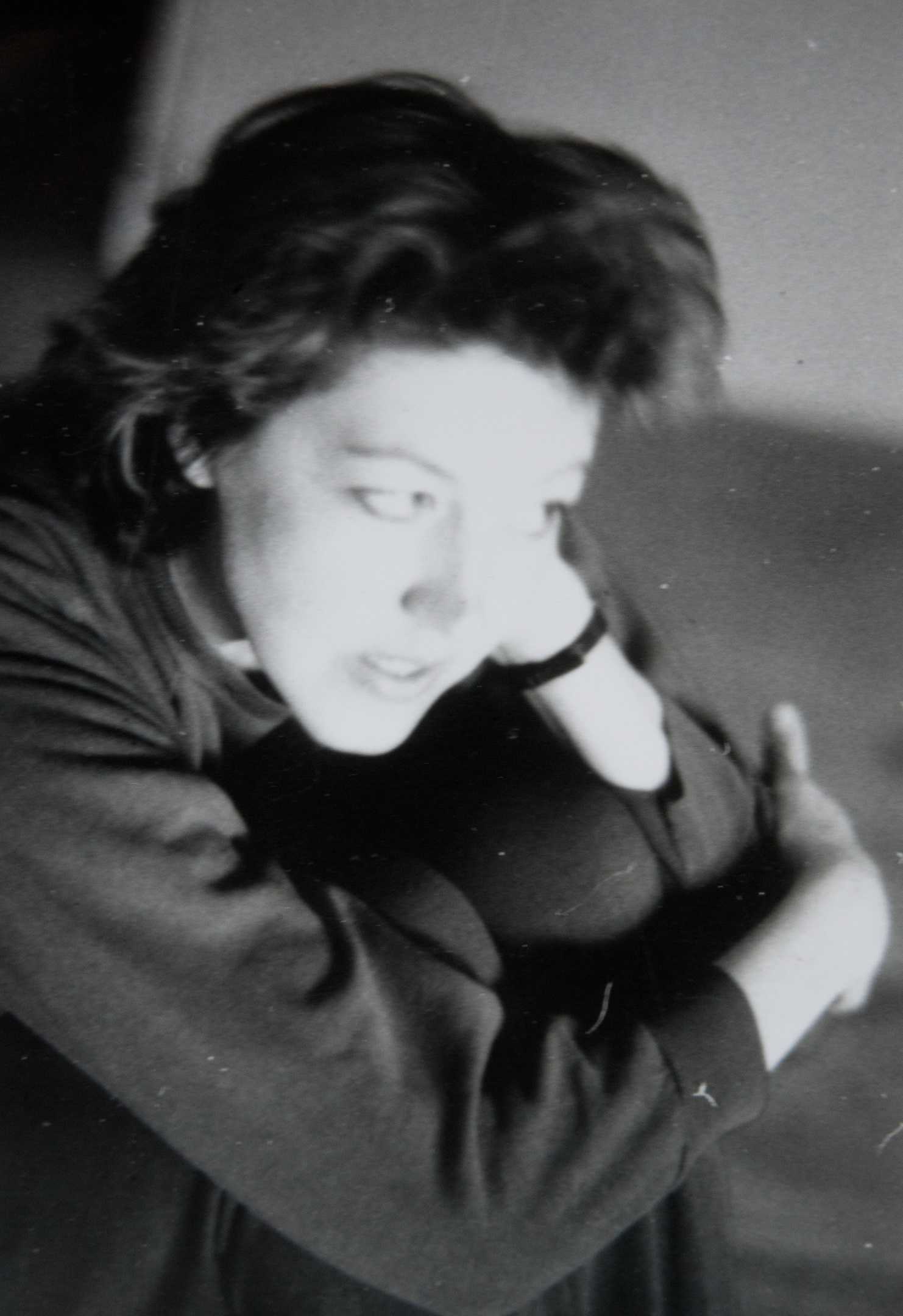
- Photo from the 1980s
- Born: Mary Adele Davidson; 1951/1952; Texas
- Died: March 13, 2012 (aged 60); Santa Fe, New Mexico
- Known for: Modern Dance
- Spouse: Mark Reiff

Mary Adele "Della" Davidson (1951/1952 – March 13, 2012) was an American modern dancer, choreographer, and dance professor at the University of California, Davis Department of Theatre and Dance.

== Life ==
Mary Adele Davidson was born in Texas, but grew up in Michigan. While she had trained in ballet since elementary school, she discovered modern dance in college, attending Michigan State, the University of Utah, and the University of Arizona. She joined the faculty of the University of California, Davis in 2001. While there, she co-created The Weight of Memory with Ellen Bromberg, a choreographer/dance filmmaker, and Collapse (suddenly falling down), with the KeckCAVES institute. At the time of her death, she was working with Bromberg on a piece titled and the snow fell softly on all the living and the dead.

She was Artistic Director of Della Davidson Dance Theater since 1986 and Sideshow Physical Theater at UC Davis since 2001. She created more than forty works in her lifetime, many of them multidisciplinary, combining dance and film.

== Assessment ==
Driven by an urge to get away from the "roles" she and other women had been brought up to inhabit, she often created dance that evoked the raw energy of forceful women, their strength, physicality and sensuality. Heavily ironic, pieces such as 10 P.M. Dream or Fierce/Pink/House displayed gender stereotypes only to expose them as insidious traps, and she was firmly committed to feminism as a challenge to oppression and small-mindedness.

== Night Stories ==
In 1997, Davidson adapted for dance three stories from the book The Stories of Eva Luna by Isabel Allende: Wicked Girl, Tosca, and Revenge. The dance was titled Night Stories: The Eva Luna Project First Cycle and was first performed at the Theater Artaud in San Francisco, California.

== Awards ==
- Isadora Duncan Award for Outstanding Achievement in Choreography
- 1990 North American Award for Choreography

== Legacy ==
The Della Davidson Prize is an annual award of $1,220 to support "innovative dance and dance/theater artists."

== Personal ==
Davidson was married to Mark Reiff. She died on March 13, 2012, in Santa Fe, New Mexico.

== Sources ==
- Dancersgroup. "Della Davidson Prize". dancersgroup.org.
- Davis, Giancarlo (September 1997). "Dream My State of Affairs". metroactive.com.
- Evenson, Laura (September 24, 1997). "Dancing With Allende: 'Night Stories' spins off of her 'Eva Luna'".
- Obituary (2012). "Della (Mary Adele) Davidson". Santa Fe New Mexican.
- UCDavis (2012). "Remembering Professor Della Davidson, Department of Theatre and Dance". ucdavis.edu. Archived from the original on September 24, 2014.
- Dave Jones (May 29, 2012). "THE ARTS: A new dance work, driven by Prof. Davidson's inquiry into life, death, beauty". ucdavis.edu.
