= Eleanor Alberga =

Jamaican contemporary music composer

Eleanor Alberga OBE
- Born: Eleanor Deanne Therese Alberga; 30 September 1949 (age 76); Kingston, Jamaica
- Education: Jamaica School of Music; Royal Academy of Music
- Occupation: Music composer
- Spouse: Thomas Bowes (m. 1992)

Eleanor Deanne Therese Alberga OBE (born 30 September 1949) is a Jamaican contemporary music composer who lives and works in the United Kingdom. Her most recent compositions include two violin concertos, a trumpet concerto and a symphony.

== Career ==
Eleanor Alberga was born in Kingston, Jamaica. She decided at the age of five to be a concert pianist and began composing short pieces. While still at school, she played the guitar with The Jamaican Folk Singers. She studied music at Jamaica School of Music and in 1970 she won the biennial West Indian Associated Board Scholarship, which allowed her to study at the Royal Academy of Music in London, England, where one of her teachers was Richard Stoker. After completing her studies, she performed as a concert pianist. In 2001 she ended her career as a performer to concentrate full-time on composition and was awarded a NESTA Fellowship.

Alberga works as a guest lecturer at the Royal Academy of Music in London. She has been pianist and music director for the London Contemporary Dance Theatre and played with Nanquindo (four players on two pianos). Her music has been performed by the Royal Philharmonic, the London Philharmonic, Bournemouth Sinfonietta, London Mozart Players and The Women's Philharmonic of San Francisco, and in countries including Australia, South America, Canada, Europe and China.

She married the violinist Thomas Bowes in 1992. They live in Herefordshire and perform together as a duo called Double Exposure. Bowes was the premiere soloist for both of her Violin Concertos (2001 and 2019). Alberga was appointed Officer of the Order of the British Empire (OBE) in the 2021 Birthday Honours for services to music.

== Music ==
As a composer, Alberga uses tonal harmony and emphasises repeated rhythmic patterns. Some of the piano music in particular, such as the Jamaican Medley (1983), Hill and Gully Ride (1990) and 3 Day Mix (1991), draw on her Jamaican background in their use of colour and cross-rhythms. The chamber work Nightscape: the Horniman Serenade (1983) uses elements of jazz. Later pieces show an increasing use of dissonance, as in her three string quartets (1993, 1994 and 2001), which have been recorded by Ensemble Arcadiana.

Alberga has received several high-profile commissions. Roald Dahl's 'Snow White and the Seven Dwarfs' was commissioned by the Roald Dahl Foundation in 1994 and issued in conjunction with a book illustrated by Quentin Blake. It has been widely performed in schools. A later recording by the Taliesin Orchestra in 2011 featured Danny DeVito, Griff Rhys Jones and Joanna Lumley as the narrators. The opera Letters of a Love Betrayed, based on a short story from Isabel Allende's The Stories of Eva Luna, with a libretto by Donald Sturrock, was commissioned by Music Theatre Wales. It opened at the Royal Opera House Linbury Studio in 2009 before touring England and Wales. The choral work Arise, Athena!, setting her own text, was written to open the last night of the BBC Proms in 2015.

== Recent activity ==
The Villiers Quartet performed the String Quartet No 2 in its 2021–22 concert season.

The Trumpet Concerto, based on Caribbean and Latin American folk legends, was written for the London Schools Symphony Orchestra and premiered by them, with soloist Pacho Flores, at the Barbican Centre in London on 20 September 2021. Recordings of the two Violin Concertos (soloist Thomas Bowes) and The Soul's Expression (baritone Morgan Pearse) by the BBC National Orchestra of Wales, first broadcast in 2021, were issued by Lyrita in February 2022. The world premiere of her Symphony No 1, Strata, was given by the Brandon Hill Chamber Orchestra at St George's Church in Bristol on 5 March 2022.

The world premiere of her Piano Concerto took place at Liverpool Philharmonic Hall on 25 April 2024, with soloist Alim Beisembayev and Royal Liverpool Philharmonic Orchestra, conducted by Domingo Hindoyan. In May 2024, Resonus Classics issued Strata, a CD of orchestral music including the Symphony No 1 (2022), Tower (2017) and the six movement Mythologies suite (2000). Pianist Hanni Liang recorded Cwicseolfor ('quicksilver') in 2024.

== Works ==
Opera

- Market of the Dead (1997)
- Letters of a Love Betrayed (2009)

Orchestra

- Sun Warrior (1990) (chorus and orchestra)
- Jupiter's Fairground, overture (1991)
- Roald Dahl's 'Snow White and the Seven Dwarfs' (1994) (narrators and orchestra, also chamber version)
- Mythologies (2000)
- Violin Concerto No. 1 (2001)
- Arise, Athena! (2015) (chorus and orchestra)
- Tower (2017) (percussion, strings and solo string quartet)
- Violin Concerto No.2 Narcissus (2019)
- Trumpet Concerto Invocation (2021)
- Symphony No. 1, Strata (2022)
- Piano Concerto (2024)

Chamber Music

- Resolution (1982) (oboe and guitar)
- Clouds (1984) (piano quintet)
- Animal Banter (1989) (flute, guitar and double bass, or flute, piano and cello)
- Dancing with the Shadow (1990) (ensemble)
- Nightscape (The Horniman Serenade) (1993) (ensemble)
- String Quartet No. 1 (1993)
- String Quartet No. 2 (1994)
- The Wild Blue Yonder (1995) (violin and piano)
- No-Man’s-Land Lullaby (1996) (violin and piano)
- Glinting, Glancing Shards (1997) (saxophone quartet)
- On a Bat's Back I do Fly (2000) (ensemble)
- Remember (2000) (string quartet)
- String Quartet No. 3 (2001)
- Tiger Dream in Forest Green (2005) (ensemble)
- Langvad (2006) (ensemble)
- Piano Quintet (2007)
- Succubus Moon (2007) (oboe quintet)
- Shining Gate of Morpheus (2012) (horn quintet)
- Glacier (2013) (flexible ensemble with keyboard)
- Ride Through (2015) (solo cello)

Piano

- Andy (1959)
- Jamaican Medley (1983)
- Ice Flow (1985)
- It's Time (1985)
- Two-piano Suite (1986) (two piano, four hands)
- Fizz (1988)
- Hill and Gully Ride (1990) (two piano, eight hands)
- 3-Day Mix (1991) (piano, four hands)
- If The Silver Bird Could Speak (1996)
- Only a Wish Away (1997)
- For Whom (2005)
- Oh Chaconne! (2014) (original version choreographed as Lingua Franca by Robert Cohan)
- Presence (2019) (first portion of Piano Sonata Seraph)
- Cwicseolfor (2021) (written for Isata Kanneh-Mason commissioned by the Barbican Centre London and the European Concert Hall Organisation in collaboration with B:Music)

Vocal and Choral

- Her Lament: One Cezanne Apple (1996)
- De Profundis (1997)
- My Heart Danceth (2007)
- The Glimpse (2016) (baritone and string quartet)
- The Soul's Expression (2017) (baritone and strings or piano)
- Awed Light Its Chant Entrances (2019)
