= The Infinite Plan =

1991 novel by Isabel Allende

- First edition (publ. Sudamericana); Cover art by Joaquín Sorolla y Bastida, "Children on the Beach", 1910 and Ferdinand Hodler, "Eiger, Monch and Jungfrau in Moonlight", 1908
- Author: Isabel Allende
- Original title: El plan infinito
- Publication date: 1991

The Infinite Plan (Spanish: El plan infinito) is a 1991 novel by Isabel Allende. The novel follows the protagonist, North American Greg Reeves through fives decades of his life, as he rises from a childhood in LA, through the Vietnam war and finally later life crises. The first printing of the novel in English had 100,000 copies. The Los Angeles Times compared the novel to works by Bryce Courtenay, Ayn Rand, and James T. Farrell.

== Reception ==
Publishers Weekly is critical of the novel, describing the protagonist as "unsympathetic character", which " readers may have [tire] of his self-destructive behavior." Similarly, the L.A Times was critical, saying that in the novel "Allende has thrown away images, style and magic in this new book", when compared to the successful style of The House of the Spirits. The Independent was generally positive about the novel, but concludes that the later parts of the novel, set in the 80s, "lose heart", becoming boring with very little excitement or good charactersizations.
