= Paula (memoir) =

1994 memoir by Isabel Allende

- First edition (Spanish)
- Author: Isabel Allende
- Genre: Memoir
- Publisher: Sudamericana / Plaza & Janés
- Publication date: 1994
- ISBN: 978-0-06-092721-9

Paula is a 1994 memoir by Isabel Allende. She intended to write a straightforward narrative about the darkest experience of her own life. But the book is a tribute to her deceased daughter Paula Frías Allende, who fell into a porphyria-induced coma in 1991 and never recovered.

== Plot summary ==
Isabel Allende wrote Paula while tending to her daughter, Paula Frías Allende, who was in a coma arising from complications of porphyria. Allende started the book as a letter to Paula, explaining what she was missing so she would not be confused when she recovered. The book includes accounts both of Paula's treatment and of Allende's life, sometimes overlapping with the content of Allende's first novel, The House of the Spirits. Paula died on December 6, 1992. She was survived by her husband, Ernesto Diaz, and other family members.

== Themes and issues ==
- In her agonized self-questioning after she finally concedes defeat and surrenders her daughter to death, Isabel strips to her core in the presence of her brother Juan, who has become a priest:

'I'm lost, I don't know who I am, I try to remember who I was once but I find only disguises, masks, projections, the confused images of a woman I can't recognize. Am I the feminist I thought I was, or the frivolous girl who appeared on television wearing nothing but ostrich feathers? The obsessive mother, the unfaithful wife, the fearless adventurer, or the cowardly woman? Am I the person who helped political refugees find asylum or the one who ran away because she couldn't handle fear? Too many contradictions ...'

'You're all of them, and also the samurai who is battling death.'

'Was battling, Juan. I've lost.'

- In the letter Paula wrote her family on her honeymoon, with the proviso that it was not to be read until after her death, she appears to have foreseen her coma, and her mother's refusal to let her die:

I do not want to remain trapped in my body. Freed from it, I will be closer to those I love. Please don't be sad, I am still with you, except I am closer than I was before. In another time, we will be reunited in spirit. ... Remember that we spirits can best help, accompany, and protect, those who are happy ...

== Style ==
Allende described the book as a memoir rather than an autobiography, saying that autobiographies are always "about facts, events, dates and people. This is about sentiments. I feel it's very subjective. I could never write an autobiography. I never remember facts."

Bárbara Mujica wrote that "sections of the book read like a novel, at times exhibiting an almost surrealist atmosphere". In Hispania, Catherine R. Perricone defined Paula as a "metarealistic narrative" for its transcendence of the "memoir" genre and how it "appropriates multiple generic discourses anchored in reality: history, biography, elegy, confession, autobiography, Bildungsroman, and testi-monial. The literary framework of the narrative is paradigmatic of the reality Allende presents because of the essential relationship these genres have to reality. Stated another way, the generic forms themselves exemplify reality owing to their essential foundation in the real. Yet, at the same time, the book approaches the novelesque in the Bakhtinian sense. Likewise the fictional element associated with the novel surfaces in the employment of magical realism, the leyenda, and even the injection of a cuento de hadas.
