= Martín Kohan =

Argentine academic (born 1967)

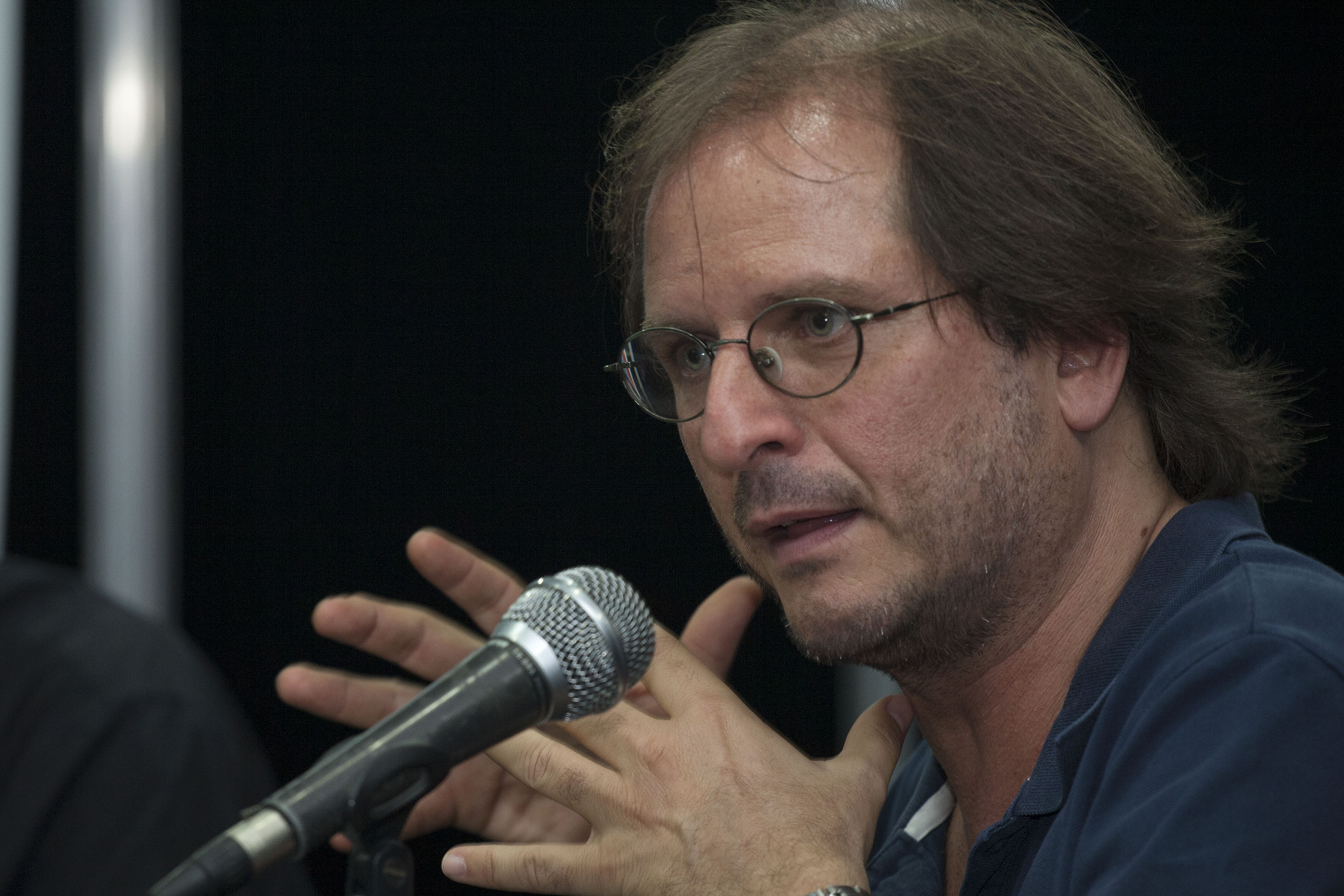
Martín Kohan

Martín Kohan (born 1967) is an Argentine academic, essayist and novelist. He was born and raised in Buenos Aires. He teaches literary theory at the University of Buenos Aires and the University of Patagonia. He has published more than a dozen books in various genres - essays, short stories and novels. His best-known novel is Ciencias morales which won the Premio Herralde and was turned into a film called La mirada invisible by the director Diego Lerman. His work has been translated into English, French, Italian, German and Hebrew. Two of his novels are available in English: School for Patriots and Seconds Out. Both were translated by Nick Caistor under the Serpent's Tail imprint.
