= The Stories of Eva Luna =

1989 short story collection by Isabel Allende

- First edition
- Author: Isabel Allende
- Original title: Cuentos de Eva Luna
- Translator: Margaret Sayers Peden
- Cover artist: Paul Gauguin, "The Siesta", 1891/2
- Language: Spanish
- Genre: Short stories
- Publisher: Sudamericana
- Publication date: 1989
- Publication place: Chile
- English publication date: 1991

The Stories of Eva Luna (Spanish: Cuentos de Eva Luna) is a 1989 collection of Spanish-language short stories by the Chilean-American writer Isabel Allende. It consists of stories told by the title character of Allende's earlier novel Eva Luna. The literary critic Bárbara Mujica wrote: "The Chilean author presents her stories through the age-old device used by Scheherazade: the narrator tells them to her lover to entertain him. Like the famous Arabic tales, these stories combine fantasy with biting social satire and psychological insight."

== Contents ==
Story	Original title
"Two Words"	"Dos palabras"
"Wicked Girl"	"Niña perversa"
"Clarisa"	"Clarisa"
"Toad's Mouth"	"Boca de sapo"
"The Gold of Tomas Vargas"	"El oro de Tomás Vargas"
"If You Touched My Heart"	"Si me tocaras el corazón"
"Gift for a Sweetheart"	"Regalo para una novia"
"Tosca"	"Tosca"
"Walimai"	"Walimai"
"Ester Lucero"	"Ester Lucero"
"Simple Maria"	"María la boba"
"Our Secret"	"Lo más olvidado del olvido"
"The Little Heidelberg"	"El pequeño Heidelberg"
"The Judge's Wife"	"La mujer del juez"
"A Road North"	"Un camino hacia el Norte"
"The Schoolteacher's Guest"	"El huésped de la maestra"
"The Proper Respect"	"Con todo el respeto debido"
"Interminable Life"	"Vida interminable"
"A Discreet Miracle"	"Un discreto milagro"
"Revenge"	"Una venganza"
"Letters of Betrayed Love"	"Cartas de amor traicionado"
"The Phantom Palace"	"El palacio imaginado"
"Of Clay We Are Created"	"De barro estamos hechos"

== Synopsis ==
=== "Two Words" ===
Belisa Crepusculario sells various "services" related to words and languages. When she is a child, she runs away from home across plains into a small village. There, she discovers writing through a newspaper, learns language through a dictionary, and starts selling "words." When a rebel (in the Mexican Civil War) dubbed The Colonel decides he wants to become more benevolent and presidential, he sends his man El Mulato to find Belisa and bring her to him. With Belisa's help, The Colonel is able to learn the art of public speaking. The Colonel offers to pay Belisa for her services, but she instead gives him two secret words and goes back to her life selling words in the village. After Belisa leaves The Colonel becomes sick, causing El Mulato to believe Belisa cursed him. El Mulato abducts Belisa, believing she has the power to cure The Colonel. When El Mulato presents Belisa to The Colonel, they stare at each other before holding hands.

Though the titular "two words" are never directly mentioned in the story, it is widely presumed that they are "Te amo," "I love you" in Spanish.

== Theatrical adaptations ==
In 1997, Wicked Girl, Tosca, and Revenge were adapted by choreographer Della Davidson for a dance titled Night Stories: The Eva Luna Project First Cycle. The dance was first performed at the Theater Artaud in San Francisco, California.

Letters of Betrayed Love was adapted by Eleanor Alberga and premiered with the title The Letters of One Betrayed on 10 February 2009 at the Royal Opera House in Covent Garden, London.

Revenge - about a woman who spent years planning revenge on a man who had raped her - became the basis of an opera titled Dulce Rosa. The adaptation was made by librettist Richard Sparks and composer Lee Holdridgem, and the first production was performed by the Los Angeles Opera, conducted by Plácido Domingo. Uruguayan soprano María Antúnez sang the title role. The opera premiered on 19 May 2013 at the Broad Stage in Santa Monica, California.

In 2022, Erin McBride Africa adapted and directed seven of the stories for a College of Marin production.
