= Forest of the Pygmies =

2004 novel by Isabel Allende

- Author: Isabel Allende
- Original title: El Bosque de los Pigmeos
- Translator: Margaret Sayers Peden
- Language: Spanish
- Series: Las memorias del águila y el jaguar (The Memories of the Eagle and the Jaguar)
- Genre: Fantasy novel
- Publisher: Plaza & James Editores (Spanish version)
- Publication date: 2004
- English publication date: 2005
- Media type: Print (Hardback & Paperback)
- Pages: 224 (Spanish version)
- ISBN: 84-01-34180-9 (Spanish version)
- OCLC: 58725253
- Preceded by: Kingdom of the Golden Dragon

Forest of the Pygmies (Spanish: El Bosque de los Pigmeos) is a 2004 novel by Chilean novelist Isabel Allende and a sequel to City of the Beasts and Kingdom of the Golden Dragon.

== Plot summary ==
Kate Cold, an International Geographic reporter, is on safari in Kenya with her grandson Alex and his friend Nadia. They soon meet Angie Ninderera, a bold and seductive pilot, and Brother Fernando, a Catholic missionary who needs to reach a jungle-girt village called Ngoubé; its people are tended to by his friars. In a recent letter his friars described him their toil and the dangers they were facing due to the chiefs’ disesteem for their presence. Some time ago these chiefs—King Kosongo, commandant Mbembelé and sorcerer Sombe—seized Ngoubé, toppled its queen, and subjected its people to ceaseless attrition. Kate and her friends agree to help despite Fernando’s and Angie’s rows.

Once in the village, they masquerade as reporters who wish to interview the king on his “famed power and wisdom,” but Kosongo has them locked in a sentineled, empty hut. Nadia slinks out to the village’s women, who have been living in jail while the males have become cruel spies. She and Alex flee to find the queen and the pygmies, who all vow to mutiny.

A fleet-footed pygmy duels and tires the commandant, who is chased off by Alex in his jaguar form. Sombe appears to quell the revolt, but Nadia appears along with the queen and a group of powerful friends. The foe is vanquished, and when Angie removes his mask, it turns out that he, Mbembelé and Kosongo are one. The man is tossed to the crocodiles.

Fernando says he will help the locals rebuild their lives, and Angie succeeds in phoning a friend of hers, who agrees to pick up her and the others.

Two years later: Alexander is a medical student at Berkeley, and Nadia is at last willing to go to college, too. He lands in New York, where Nadia and Kate share a flat, to take his friend to a ceremony. It turns out that Kate has written three books on their adventures.
