= Violeta (novel) =

2022 novel by Isabel Allende

- First edition
- Author: Isabel Allende
- Translator: Frances Riddle
- Language: Spanish
- Subject: Historical, autobiographical
- Genre: Historical fiction
- Publisher: Plaza & Janés
- Publication date: 25 January 2022
- Publication place: Chile
- Pages: 336
- ISBN: 9788401027475
- Preceded by: A Long Petal of the Sea

Violeta is a 2022 novel by Chilean-American author Isabel Allende. It is a fictional autobiographical account of the life of Violeta Del Valle and how she witnessed the various upheavals of the 20th century. Violeta in the book recalls all she has seen and experienced in an unnamed South American country spanning 100 years.

== Plot ==
Violeta tells the story of the author Violeta Del Valle. The book deals with a vivid 100-year-story that contains surviving a pandemic, the great depression, loss of familial wealth, political upheavals, marriage problems, estrangement and eventual peace.

During the 2020 pandemic, Violeta is breathing her last as a ripe old woman of 100 years. She writes a letter to her grown up grandson telling him about her multiple difficulties.

Violeta was born in 1920 amid the Spanish flu epidemic in an unnamed South American country on a stormy night. She was the youngest daughter of an influential family and had five older brothers. Her father loses everything in the Great Depression and the family had to relocate from the comforts of their mansion in the capital to the modest rural countryside. Violeta references personal and political upheaval spanned over decades, including the coups and military uprisings and similar horrors of 1970s which seemed to encapsulate the whole of South America.

Violeta has a long passionate but troubled relationship with her former husband and the father of her son. Her son is a journalist who has come into the government's Black books because of his career; he winds up fleeing to seek asylum in Argentina and then in Norway. After this tumultuous period in her life, Violeta finally find a partner and solace in a retired diplomat who is also a naturalist.

== Reception ==
The New York Times hailed Violeta as "a feminist awakening amid twin repressive forces, the state and the domestic sphere, in passages whose sheer breadth is punctuated by sometimes stilted, explanatory dialogue". In Kirkus Reviews, Violeta's character is described as "thinly drawn" and the novel is called "a slog even Allende fans may have trouble getting through." More positively, Booklist said the novel has a "special magnetism and resonance" that "ranks among [Allende's] best."
