= Paula Frías Allende =

Chilean psychologist, daughter of Isabel Allende

- Born: 22 October 1963; Santiago, Chile
- Died: 6 December 1992 (aged 29); San Francisco, California, U.S.
- Occupations: Psychologist, educator, humanitarian
- Spouse: Ernesto Diaz
- Parent: Isabel Allende
- Relatives: Allende family
- Website: isabelallendefoundation.org}

Paula Frías Allende (22 October 1963 – 6 December 1992) was a Chilean educator and humanitarian who was the daughter of Chilean-American author Isabel Allende. Her grandfather was first cousin to Salvador Allende, President of Chile from 1970 to 1973. After her death, her mother started a foundation to continue humanitarian works in Paula's name.

== Life ==
Paula Frías worked as a humanitarian for impoverished communities located in Venezuela and Spain, using her skills as an educator and psychologist. She married Ernesto Diaz in Venezuela, in 1991. She was a Roman Catholic, unlike her mother, like it is stated in the novel she wrote about her.

== Illness and death ==
In 1991, Paula went into a coma after complications of porphyria had hospitalised her. An error in medication resulted in severe brain damage, leaving her in a persistent vegetative state. Her mother had her moved to a hospital in San Francisco, California and later to her home, where she died at the age of 29 on 6 December 1992.

== Foundation and memoirs ==
Isabel Allende started the Isabel Allende Foundation on 9 December 1996, in homage to her daughter. Her autobiographical book Paula is dedicated to her. The foundation is "dedicated to supporting programs that promote and preserve the fundamental rights of women and children to be empowered and protected."
