= The Japanese Lover =

2015 novel by Isabel Allende

- First edition
- Author: Isabel Allende
- Original title: El amante japonés
- Translator: Nick Caistor, Amanda Hopkinson
- Subject: Historical Romance, Family Saga
- Genre: Historical Fiction, Contemporary Fiction
- Set in: Poland, United States
- Publisher: Plaza & Janés; Editorial Sudamericana
- Publication date: May 2015
- English publication date: November 3, 2015
- Media type: Print (paperback and hardcover)
- Pages: 352

The Japanese Lover (Spanish: El amante japonés) is the eighteenth book by Chilean author Isabel Allende. It was published in 2015 and recounts a wartime love story between a Polish woman and a Japanese American in the aftermath of the Nazi Invasion of Poland in 1939. The book is set in World War II. Just like Allende's other books, it tells a story which spans decades.

It follows the magical realism and historical romance/fiction like her previous books. The Japanese Lover also coincided with Allende receiving the Presidential Medal of Freedom by US President, Barack Obama.

== Plot synopsis ==
In 2015, octogenarian Alma Belasco is moved into the Lark House, a retirement home for quirky individuals in San Francisco. Lark House's caretaker, Irina Bazili, is a young Moldovan immigrant who seems to have some intense trauma of her own. Because of her discreet nature, Irina is hired by Alma as her personal secretary. Throughout the book, various momentous events of the second half of the 20th century are related alongside Alma's own experiences.

A secret admirer of Alma sends her a series of letters, notes and gifts. While searching for her admirer, Alma is accompanied by Irina and Alma's grandson, Seth, who is in love with Irina. As Irina becomes closer to Seth and Alma, she discovers a photo of a man in Alma's room. Alma reveals the man was Ichimei Fukuda, a Japanese-American whom Alma met in 1939, and tells Irina the story of how she met Ichimei.

In 1939, Germany was invading Poland, and eight-year-old Alma was sent San Francisco to her wealthy uncle and aunt to escape the Holocaust. Alma met and befriended Ichimei,the son of her uncle's gardener, and they later fell in love. Following the attacks on Pearl Harbor, they were separated when Japanese-Americans were sent to Internment zones. They maintained their secret romance for decades through the means of letter. Although Alma later married Nathaniel, her cousin and a childhood friend of both her and Ichimei, she still sporadically continued her romance with Ichimei.

Irina, despite trying to avoid any romance, confides in Seth and tells him about her abusive relationship with her step-father. As the young pair grows closer, Alma grows frailer and frailer, finally passing away one day. The story closes with one more letter between the two fated lovers who were never meant to be, and the revelation that Ichimei had died some years previously.

== Reception ==
Just like her other books, The Japanese Lover can also be called a commercial success being a bestseller. The book covers a lot of material from the 1930s until the 2010s but in the process loses itself to lengthy writing failing to leave a mark, and the big cast of characters, losing themselves to stereotypes. As written by Lucy Ferris of the New York Times, the thin plot and weakly motivated characters, fail to lift this novel very high. The Los Angeles Times stated, "The Japanese Lover is a humorless and earthbound disappointment".
