= Bela Katona =

Hungarian violinist

Bela Katona (21 April 1920 – 5 February 2018) was a Hungarian violinist.

== Life and career ==
Katona was born in Pozsony (now Bratislava). At the age of 19, he entered the Franz Liszt Academy in Budapest to study with Ede Zathureczky, formerly assistant to Jeno Hubay, and later became his teaching assistant. Ernő Dohnányi was at that time the Academy's director, and Béla Bartók was professor of piano.

Revered as a teacher in his native Hungary, Katona moved to England in 1960, where he continued to teach. His students included many of today's most accomplished violinists. Alumni of his class are now significant teachers in their own rights: Dona Lee Croft of the Royal College of Music, London, and Kazuki Sawa of Tokyo National University of Fine Arts are examples. Other notable students include violinists Thomas Bowes and Cynthia Fleming (Leader, BBC Concert Orchestra, 2003-2014).

== Sources ==
- Biography of Bela Katona at Ciaccona International Music Course
- Biography of Dona Lee Croft at the Royal College of Music
- Biography of Kazuki Sawa from Aspen Artists
