= Eva Luna =

1987 novel by Isabel Allende

- First edition (Spanish)
- Author: Isabel Allende
- Translator: Margaret Sayers Peden
- Cover artist: Luis Vargas
- Language: Spanish
- Publisher: Editorial Oveja Negra, Knopf
- Publication date: 1987
- English publication date: 1988
- Media type: Print (Hardback and Paperback)
- Pages: 241
- ISBN: 978-9-580-60233-0

Eva Luna is a novel written by Chilean novelist Isabel Allende in 1987 and translated from Spanish to English by Margaret Sayers Peden.

Eva Luna takes us into the life of the eponymous protagonist, an orphan who grows up in an unidentified country in South America. While the country's political history, traced through several decades of the mid-20th century, bears many similarities to Chile (the author's original nationality), the geography and social context of the story depict a society more similar to Venezuela (where she was exiled for over a decade).

The novel takes us through Eva Luna's journey through life so far and her ability to tell stories, interweaving Eva's personal story with the broader geopolitical turmoil of Latin America during the 1950s – 1980s.

== Plot summary ==
The story is told from Eva's first-person point of view. In some sections Eva narrates Rolf Carlé's life. The story opens as Eva describes her mother's life, and how her mother (Consuelo) ended up working for a professor. One day, the professor's Indian gardener is bitten by a snake and whilst on his deathbed, Consuelo has sex with him, thus conceiving Eva. Miraculously, Eva's father recovers. Eva's mother then dies after choking on a chicken bone and leaves Eva to fend for herself. After the Professor dies, Eva moves on and eventually stumbles upon Huberto Naranjo, who places her in the care of La Señora, the owner of a brothel.

After living in harmony for a few years, a new police chief moves in and immediately storms the brothel. Eva is forced to flee and is eventually found by Riad Halabí, a man with a cleft palate. Eva moves to Agua Santa with Halabí and settles into her new life, living with Riad and his wife, Zulema. After a few years, Riad's cousin Kamal moves in to live with them. Zulema is instantly infatuated with Kamal and when Riad goes on a trip, she seduces him, after which Kamal immediately leaves. Eventually Zulema loses interest in life and commits suicide by shooting herself in the mouth. After Eva is detained on suspicion of murdering Zulema, Riad bribes the police to release Eva. Eva and Riad realize that she must leave to escape the rumors, but before she leaves they share one night of passion.

When Eva returns to the city, she reunites with the beautiful and engaging transgender woman formerly called Melecio, now known as Mimí. Eva then reunites with Huberto Naranjo for infrequent sexual encounters, which Eva treasures as the only time she can see her loved one. Huberto is leader of a guerrilla unit fighting a revolution. As time goes on, Eva realizes that Huberto, although a dear friend, is not the man for her.

Throughout the novel a parallel narrative is told: the life of Rolf Carlé, traced from childhood to adulthood. Rolf grows up in Eastern Europe with a sadistic father who returns from the war and regularly torments and humiliates his wife. After his father is killed by some local boys, Rolf's mother resolves to send him to South America to be raised by his Aunt and Uncle. As Rolf grows up, he becomes interested in reporting news and becomes a leading journalist, shooting film footage from the front line. Rolf films the guerrillas, meeting Huberto, and later Eva. As the two slowly fall in love, they help the guerrillas in releasing nine prisoners from jail as an act of rebellion. When the rescue is complete, the two retreat to his aunt and uncle's home. There they profess their love for each other, consummating their relationship and agreeing to marry.

== Characters ==
- Eva Luna: Narrator, daughter of Consuelo and an Indian gardener, orphaned at age six, talented storyteller, writer, revolutionary, survivor
- Huberto Naranjo: Eva's friend for many years, a ragamuffin street boy, later a fighter in the guerilla movement, Eva's first love
- Consuelo: Eva's mother, found in the middle of a jungle by missionaries (also an orphan), has red hair, gives Eva the gift of storytelling, dies by eating a chicken bone
- Riad Hilabí: One of Eva's many "patrons" (people she lives with), but Riad is more of a father figure, Eva lives with him for many years, has a cleft-lip, known in his village as "the Turk" (from Turkey, speaks Arabic), very kind and generous, shopkeeper, incredible lover
- El Negro: Friend of Huberto Naranjo, bartender
- La Señora: Lady-pimp, takes Eva in, gives her a makeover, makes Eva leave after The Revolt of the Whores so the police do not find her with a minor, best friend of Melecio/Mimí
- Melecio/Mimí: The best friend of La Señora, a transgender woman, eventually becomes Mimí. Mimí is a famous actress in telenovelas, and Eva's good friend and roommate later in Eva's life, encourages Eva to write down her stories
- Zulema: Riad Hilabí's wife, hates Riad because he has a cleft lip, lazy, depressed, has a one-night affair with Riad's nephew, eventually commits suicide
- Rolf Carlé: Grows up in post-World War II Europe, has a sadistic father and a kind but passive mother, leaves his home after his father's death, lives with his aunt and uncle, has threesomes with his two cousins, becomes a photojournalist eventually filming the guerilla movement (he meets Naranjo this way), falls in love with Eva at close of novel.

== Major themes ==
Several different ideas are raised by Allende in this novel, often called a picaresque novel, with regard to the protagonist and heroine, Eva. Her ability to tell stories and concoct tales is one of her gifts and it is through this ability that Eva is able to cope with the oppressive atmosphere in Latin America, directly following World War II. Eva's stories intertwine Magical realism, that is the amalgamation of supernatural elements and realistic themes. Through this means, Eva is able to 'escape' her reality and construct her own view of society that she is better able to deal with. Described as a modern Scheherazade, Eva's ability to induce others with her stories is her gift to the world, helping her deal with the difficulties that many women, like herself, faced in a tyrannical and explosive political environment.

Allende critiques on the gender imbalance that was and still is present in most Latin American countries. Generally, women were regarded as objects, entities that were subjugated in a male hegemony. Through the protagonist Eva, Allende has found a character that reflects on all the characteristics that all women trying to survive in the harsh conditions of Latin America, should embody. Eva's name is itself symbolic. Luna is Spanish for "moon" – a symbol of the matriarchal power that women possess. In many ways the character Eva reflects Allende herself and the struggle that she went through after her father's cousin, Salvador Allende, was overthrown as Chilean President on September 11, 1973.

== Reception ==
Eva Luna received the American Book Award in 1989.

== Adaptation ==
Latinx theatre company Repertorio Español premiered the stage adaptation of Eva Luna in June 2022. Directed by Estefanía Fadul and adapted by OBIE Award-winning playwright Caridad Svich, Eva Luna is performed in Spanish with English subtitles.

== See also ==
- The Stories of Eva Luna
