= City of the Beasts =

2002 book by Isabel Allende

- First edition
- Author: Isabel Allende
- Original title: La ciudad de las bestias
- Translator: Margaret Sayers Peden
- Language: Spanish
- Series: 2002
- Genre: Children's literature
- Publisher: Sudamericana
- Publication date: 2002
- Publication place: United States
- Media type: Print (hardback & paperback)
- Pages: 406 pp
- ISBN: 0-06-050917-1
- OCLC: 49495107
- LC Class: PZ7.A43912 Ci 2002
- Followed by: Kingdom of the Golden Dragon

City of the Beasts (Spanish: La ciudad de las bestias) is the first young adult novel by Chilean-American writer Isabel Allende. Published in 2002, the story is set in the Amazon rainforest. The novel was translated by Margaret Sayers Peden from Spanish to English. Walden Media acquired the novel's movie rights in 2006, but no film has yet been produced.

== Plot summary ==
=== Beginning ===
City of the Beasts begins with Alexander Cold, a 15-year-old boy who is going through a family crisis. When his parents leave for Texas to try to treat his mother's cancer, Alex and his two sisters are sent to live with their grandmothers. Despite his desperate pleading, Alex is sent off to New York to stay with his eccentric grandmother, Kate Cold, an adventurer and reporter for International Geographic Magazine. Upon arrival, he finds out that his grandmother – who hates being called "Grandma", and so will only respond to her proper name – had no intentions of collecting him at the airport, which forces him to find his own way to her apartment. In the process, he meets Morgana, a homeless girl in her mid-20s who offers him pot, and steals his backpack that contained his clothes, his money, and most importantly his flute – Kate consoles her grandson by giving him the flute that once belonged to his grandfather, musician Joseph Cold.

Alex barely begins to settle in when Kate announces that she will be taking him with her to the Amazon rainforest, in search of a mysterious creature simply called "the Beast". Soon, they pack and head off to the region.

=== Arrival at the Amazon ===
When Alex and Kate reach the jungle, they join the rest of the expedition group, made up of photographers from International Geographic – including British photographer Timothy Bruce and his assistant Joel Gonzalez –; famous anthropologist Ludovic Leblanc; beautiful Venezuelan physician Dr. Omayra Torres, on a mission to vaccinate natives; Cesar Santos, their Brazilian guide; a mysterious man named Karakawe; co-sponsor and greedy entrepreneur Mauro Carías; and Captain Ariosto, commander of the village military.

Alex also befriends Nadia Santos, Cesar's twelve-year-old daughter – and through her, he meets up with an ancient shaman named Walimai, who warn them of incoming danger, and gives Nadia a protective necklace. They soon overhear parts of a conspiracy between Carías and Ariosto. Moreover, an encounter with a caged black jaguar reveals that the big cat is Alex's totem animal.

=== The expedition ===
The group leaves by boat, traveling upriver towards their destination in the heart of the jungle. Everyone in the group feels uncomfortable, as if someone were watching them. One of the soldiers dies when he is shot by a poisoned dart. Later, Joel Gonzalez is attacked and nearly killed by an anaconda. After another soldier's death, this time at the hands of a Beast, the group decides to send several people back with the traumatized Gonzalez.

Alex plays his grandfather's flute to relieve the tension. Soon after, a tribe from the mysterious "People of the Mist" kidnaps him and Nadia. They and said tribe travel further into the forest and arrive at a waterfall, which they must climb in order to reach the "Eye of the World", the village of the People of the Mist. This isn't much of a problem for Alex thanks to his rock climbing skills, whereas Nadia is plagued by her fear of heights – and so, Alex helps her overcome her fear.

When they reach the top, Alex is sent back down again to rescue the natives' chief, Mokarita, who had fallen and been mortally wounded. Once safe at the top, they arrive to the Eye of the World, a beautiful rainforest nestled amongst a range of waterfalls and tepuis.

=== The People of the Mist ===
Alex and Nadia are welcomed by the Natives, but their happiness is tempered by the death of Mokarita, who is given a traditional funeral, during which everyone takes a hallucinogenic drug.

Alex and Nadia are initiated into the clan; and being fifteen, the boy goes through a rite of passage into manhood. During the ceremony, unusual things happen: firstly, Alex transforms into a fierce jaguar, his totem animal; secondly, he receives a vision of his mom on her hospital bed, and he talks briefly with her; and thirdly, Nadia’s totem animal is revealed to be the eagle, which makes her overcome her fear of heights and fly to the highest tepui, where she finds two crystal eggs on a nest.

After the ceremonies, Alex and Nadia become respectively "Jaguar" and "Eagle". The shaman Walimai and his spirit wife take them to visit the Beasts, who live in a lair city deep within the forest, and are considered gods by the People of the Mist. Jaguar, aka Alex, correctly assumes their city to be the famous El Dorado, which is actually made out of fool's gold, and is located inside an inactive volcano, with the only entrance being a labyrinth of lava tunnels and caves, filled with mystical creatures such as blind white cats and a prehistoric bird-like dragon.

=== The Beasts of the Amazon ===
Upon arrival, Alex and Nadia meet up with the Beasts, which look like giant sloths, and function as the living memory of the tribe by remembering long epic poems recited by Walimai and his predecessors. Fearing the capture of these ancient creatures by Western scientists, our heroes warn them to be careful of foreigners, such as the expedition group they both belong. In exchange for providing the Beasts protection, they ask for gifts: Nadia, the crystal eggs she saw in her vision as an eagle, and which turn out to be giant diamonds; and Alex, the water of life to save his mother. They both manage to get them, but only by giving up what is most valuable to them: Nadia, the protective necklace given to her by Walimai; and Alex, his grandfather’s flute.

Upon returning to the village, they discover that it has been taken over by the expedition, including Marau Carías and Captain Ariosto. Just as Nadia convinces the Indians to receive vaccinations, she and Alex realize that the vaccines are actually deadly doses of the measles virus, part of Carias’s plan to kill the Amazonian natives.

By a hair, they stop the vaccinations before the first dose is given. Karakawe, an expedition member, is revealed to be an officer of the Department for the Protection of Indigenous Peoples; he is shot by Ariosto. The Indios flee into the woods as a full-fledged gunfight breaks out. Luckily, it ends quickly. Ariosto and his soldiers take captive all of the members of the expedition. Some soldiers return with the gravely injured Carias and Dr. Torres. At night, Nadia and Alex manage to escape. With Walimai's help, the rest of the men are knocked unconscious by the smell of two of the Beasts, who also kill Ariosto. The tribe brings the rest of the expedition to safety. After the People of the Mist reach an agreement with the remaining members of the expedition (they will protect that area with all the power, influence, and money they can muster), they leave.

=== Last part ===
In the end, Eagle and Jaguar must part. She gives Alex the three "crystal eggs". With the money gained from their sale, it was hoped that they would be able to fund a foundation to keep the World's Eye safe. Alex tells her that the best thing about the trip was meeting her, and they agree that they will be best friends forever.

== Literary significance and reception ==
Initial reception was split between harsh criticism and approval. Some critics regarded the novel as an engaging read and a good first try at a children's book, while others note its slow start, and tedious, somewhat unconvincing speech in translation.

City of the Beasts has been translated into over 40 languages.

== Awards and nominations ==
- San Francisco Chronicle Book Review for Nov. 17th 2002: one of the best Young Adult Science Fiction novels of 2002
- Book Magazine Best of 2002 list for Young Adults
- Time magazine 100 Best Young Adult Books of All Time

== Sequels ==
Eagle and Jaguar meet again in the sequels, Kingdom of the Golden Dragon, and Forest of the Pygmies.
