= Kingdom of the Golden Dragon =

2004 book by Isabel Allende

- Author: Isabel Allende
- Original title: El Reino del Dragón de Oro
- Translator: Margaret Seyers Peyden
- Language: Spanish
- Publisher: Rayo/ HarperCollins
- English publication date: May 2005
- Media type: Print
- Pages: 437
- ISBN: 0-06-058943-4
- OCLC: 56490511
- LC Class: PZ7.A43912 Ki 2004
- Preceded by: City of the Beasts
- Followed by: Forest of the Pygmies

Kingdom of the Golden Dragon (Spanish: El Reino del Dragón de Oro) is a 2004 book by Chilean writer Isabel Allende. It is the sequel to City of the Beasts and the prequel to Forest of the Pygmies.

== History ==
In the Himalayas, the existence of yetis is visualized, emerging as part of a prehistoric organization, but which have been part of a problem and a mystery for humans in the context of Dil Bahadur's reign and the enigmatic existence of a valuable statue.

== Plot summary ==
The plot is set in the Forbidden Kingdom, a fictional remote Himalayan country. A Buddhist lama named Tensing takes his disciple, Prince Dil Bahadur, to the Valley of the Yeti to find healing plants that do not grow anywhere else. They find themselves ringed by the yetis just as they drink in the sights, but the matriarch saves them and says that the fast-dwindling yetis have lost their forebears’ unparalleled mental powers.

The lamas teach them to milk the goats so that they can feed their cubs, and it turns out that the local fountains are toxic. The beasts’ health improves once they start shunning the fountains, and in order to thank the strangers they give them the plants they have asked for.

Meanwhile, Alex Cold and his grandmother Kate, an International Geographic reporter, depart from Brazil for New York. He gives her the diamond eggs that his friend Nadia has found near the Amazon and tells her to raise money for the People of the Mist—the South American tribe that he bonded with in City of the Beasts—as well as for other Indios. Kate, who questions the diamonds’ value, shows them to Isaac Rosenblat, a New York jeweler who confirms their unparalleled worth; he has never seen like-sized stones. Six months later, the Diamond Foundation is set up with the help of Ludovic Leblanc, an anthropologist who is Kate's nemesis. Now tasked with writing about the Forbidden Kingdom, she takes Nadia and Alex with her despite her employer's misgivings.

At the same time, the world's second-richest man—who is called the Collector—pays a crime lord known as the Specialist to steal the kingdom's national treasure, a golden dragon with unrivaled magical skills. The Collector wants to use its gifts of prophecy to predict stock and make himself the world's richest man.

Soon after landing in Asia, Kate and her friends are caught up in a plot to kidnap indigenous girls. When Nadia, who is taken for a native, is captured along with her newfound friend Pema, Alex and Kate enlist the prince, his teacher, the kingdom's forces, and the yetis to track down the abductees.

== Characters ==
- Alex is vain but affable and his greatest fear is losing his mother to cancer. 17 y He can morph himself into a black jaguar, which is his totemic animal.
- His closest friend is Nadia Santos, a Brazilian teenager who is never seen without Borobá, her loyal monkey. Her father César is loath to send her to Asia. She can turn herself into a white eagle and make herself invisible.
- Kate Cold’s love for Alex is undisputed; so is her dislike for sentiment.
- The 42-year-old Collector made his money in the computer market. He is greedy, lonely, and fairly uncouth despite his sharp intellect.
- The ingenious Specialist runs an organization which, thanks to his stupendous technical expertise, can murder or kidnap anyone and steal whatever his clients request. His real name is kept secret.
- King Dorji is a wise man who often lets his feelings becloud his judgment. His incomplete spiritual training left his mind-reading skills stunted, a flaw that marks him off from his ancestors.
- Eighteen-year-old Prince Dil Bahadur is mature but knows very little about other countries.
- Tensing prepares the prince for his duties and hones his spiritual talents.
- Tex Armadillo is a thewy American horse breeder who flies to Asia at the same time as the protagonists. Alex questions Tex's rectitude even though he once saved his life.
- Judit Kinski is a cultured, well-traveled landscaper who the king appoints to plant tulips. She is a beautiful European with raven hair, hazel eyes, and a white forelock. The king is so enamored of Judit that he proposes to her.
- Pema is a pretty 15-year-old who determines to save her country. She and the prince end up wedding for love.
- The Specialist hires the Sect of Scorpions (also called the Blue Warriors) to steal the dragon.
- Timothy Bruce and Joel González are International Geographic photographers who come along to take shots of the statue.

== Publication history ==
- Original imprint: ISBN 0-06-059170-6 (2003 Rayo, NY)
- English editions: ISBN 0-00-717748-8 (2005 HarperPerennial, UK); ISBN 0-06-058942-6 (2004 HarperCollins, US)
