= Pedro Zarraluki =

Spanish writer (1954–2025)

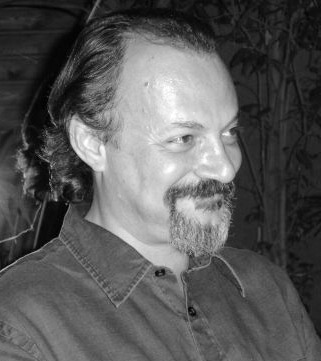
Portrait of Zarraluki

Pedro Zarraluki (Spanish: [ˈpeðɾo θaraˈluki]; 31 December 1954 – 1 March 2025) was a Spanish writer.

== Life and career ==
Zarraluki was born in Barcelona on 31 December 1954. He published his first book at the age of 20 and wrote several novels and short story collections thereafter. He won numerous prizes, including the Premio Nadal for his novel Un encargo difícil, and the Premio Herralde for La historia del silencio. The latter was translated into English by Nick Caistor.

Zarraluki was a regular contributor to the press and radio, and taught creative writing at the Ateneo Barcelonés. He died on 1 March 2025, at the age of 70.
