= Guillermo Orsi =

Argentine journalist and novelist

Guillermo Orsi (born 1946) is an Argentine journalist and crime novelist. He has written several acclaimed works of crime fiction, two of which have been translated into English by Nick Caistor. Among Orsi's literary awards is the 2009 Dashiell Hammett Prize.

He lives and works in Buenos Aires.
