= Thomas Bowes (violinist) =

- Also known as: Tom Bowes
- Born: Welwyn Garden City, Hertfordshire, England
- Genres: Classical; Soundtracks; Popular music
- Occupations: Musician; Orchestra leader
- Instrument: Violin
- Label: Various

Thomas Bowes is an English violinist and orchestra leader.

== Life and career ==
Thomas Bowes was born in Welwyn Garden City, Hertfordshire, England, and graduated from Trinity College of Music in 1982, where he studied violin under Bela Katona. Bowes played with the London Philharmonic beginning in 1985 and the Academy of St Martin in the Fields beginning in 1986. He made his debut as a soloist in London in 1987.

Bowes was a founding member of the Maggini String Quartet and served as leader from 1988 to 1992. In 1989 he began serving as leader of the London Mozart Players, where he led the ensemble at their BBC Proms debut in 1991. Bowes has served as guest leader of orchestras including the London Symphony Orchestra, the BBC Symphony Orchestra, London Sinfonietta, the Philharmonia, and the French L’Orchestre National du Capitole de Toulouse.

Bowes married pianist and composer Eleanor Alberga in 1992, and the two live in Herefordshire, England. They formed the duo Double Exposure in 1995 and began to tour internationally. During this time, Bowes developed an expanded repertoire as a soloist. He took a position as artistic director of the Langvad Chamber Music Jamboree in Denmark and with Alberga founded the Arcadia music festival in northern Herefordshire.

Bowes masters film scores and maintains an extensive discography and filmography. His most recent CD was released in 2011, Walton and Barber Violin Concertos – Thomas Bowes/Malmo Opera Orchestra/Swensen, which was well received. He plays a Nicolo Amati violin from 1659.
