= The Porcelain Fat Lady =

1984 novel by Isabel Allende

First edition (publ. Alfaguara)

The Porcelain Fat Lady (Spanish: La gorda de porcelana) is a children's story by the Chilean writer Isabel Allende, published in 1984.

== Style ==
The story is narrated by an at-first unknown person. The narrator knows the story well because it was told to her by the protagonist.

== Plot ==
The story deals with Don Cornelio, who in the beginning lives a boring and monotonous life as a typist in a notary agency. He follows the same routine every day. But his life changes when he sees La Gorda de Porcelana, named Fantasía, standing barely dressed in a store window, and decides to buy her. She fascinates him, so he is prepared to pay an entire month's salary for her. From this day on (the point of no return in the story), his life changes. Since he is not allowed to bring Fantasía into his flat, he tries to hide her at work. At work their friendship begins. Don Cornelio opens the window since this is what Fantasía is asking for, and Fantasía takes him out for a flight. Don Cornelio gives up his job after 20 years of loyal work for Fantasía and starts a new life. He conquers his shyness and becomes a colourfully dressed and very happy ice cream and chestnut seller.

== Inspiration for the story ==
The story might be an allegory for the Pinochet regime in Chile. The story was written when Allende divorced her first husband in 1973, which may have inspired the monotonous life of the protagonist (like that of Allende while she was married).
