= Island Beneath the Sea =

2009 novel by Isabel Allende

- First edition
- Author: Isabel Allende
- Original title: La Isla Bajo el Mar
- Translator: Margaret Sayers Peden
- Language: Spanish
- Genre: Historical Fiction
- Publisher: Editorial Sudamericana
- Publication date: 2009
- Publication place: United States
- English publication date: 2010
- Media type: Print (hardback & paperback)
- Preceded by: The Sum of Our Days (2008)

Island Beneath the Sea (Spanish: La Isla Bajo el Mar) is a 2009 novel by Chilean author Isabel Allende. It was first published in the United States by HarperCollins. The book was issued in 2009 in Spanish as La Isla Bajo el Mar, and was translated into English by Margaret Sayers Peden, who had translated all (except the first) of Allende's books into English. The story is set during the Haitian Revolution.

== Plot ==
The story opens on the island of Saint-Domingue (current day Haiti) in the late 18th century. Zarité (known as Tété) is the daughter of an African mother she never knew and one of the white sailors who brought her into bondage. As a young girl Tété is purchased by Violette, a mixed race courtesan, on behalf of Toulouse Valmorain, a Frenchman who has inherited his father's sugar plantation. Valmorain has dreams of financial success and is morally unopposed to slavery, though he dislikes punishing slaves himself, instead instructing his cruel overseer, Cambray, to administer the violence.

Upon Valmorain's marriage, Tété becomes his wife's personal slave and housekeeper. Valmorain's wife is fragile and superstitious and slowly succumbs to madness. As Valmorain's wife goes mad, Valmorain forces the teenage Tété into sexual servitude, which produces several illegitimate children. Spanning four decades, the narrative leaps between the social upheavals from the distant French Revolution through the immediate chaos of the Haitian Revolution, to a New Orleans fomenting with cultural change.
