= In the Midst of Winter =

2017 novel by Isabel Allende

- First edition
- Author: Isabel Allende
- Original title: Más allá del invierno
- Language: Spanish
- Subject: Hispanic culture, Literary fiction
- Genre: Fiction, Romance, Magical Realism
- Set in: Brooklyn, New York City
- Published: October 31, 2017
- Publisher: Plaza & Janés; Atria Books
- Publication place: Chile
- Media type: Print (Hardcover, Paperback)
- Pages: 352
- ISBN: 978-1501178139

In the Midst of Winter (Spanish: Más allá del invierno) is a 2017 novel by Chilean author Isabel Allende. It is the twenty-third book by Allende, who has made a name for herself as one of the eminent writers of magical realism. She is widely considered a preeminent Latin-American female author and her books, advocating feminist rights and the end of patriarchy in Latin America show her own struggles. In the Midst of Winter, follows the same pattern as her previous books, based on political injustice, the art of survival and most of all the need for love. The story is set in Brooklyn, New York City during a snowstorm, where a lonely university professor hits the car of an undocumented young Guatemalan. At first only an accident, things spiral out of control when the woman shows up at the professor's home to seek help. The professor, takes the help of his tenant, a fellow academic from Chile, as the unlikely trio embark on a journey of uncovering truth and discovering love.

== Plot synopsis ==
During the biggest snowstorm Brooklyn has ever seen, a lonely University professor, Richard Bowmaster, accidentally hits the car of an undocumented immigrant from Guatemala - Evelyn Ortega. This accident, which at first appeared to be a minor inconvenience, takes a major turn when Evelyn shows up at Richard's place seeking help. Not knowing what to do, Richard recruits his tenant, a fellow academic from Chile - Lucia Maraz - in order to solve Evelyn's plight. It is discovered that Evelyn found the corpse of a dead woman in the trunk of her boss's car. Lucia, Richard, and Evelyn embark on a road trip which slowly unveils each of their pasts.

Evelyn continues to experience trauma from coming from a country where she survived the murder of her brothers in gang violence, and Lucia struggles with returning to Chile, which she has left due to its risks. In the meantime, Richard is struggling to find love and relationships as a result of trauma from personal losses during his marriage to a Brazilian woman from his time in Rio de Janeiro, which he blames on himself. Evelyn gradually overcomes her trauma, while Richard and Lucia bond together. The book ends with Richard quoting the line from Albert Camus poem, Invincible Summer, "In the midst of winter, I finally found there was within me an invincible summer".

== Reception ==
In the midst of winter was a New York Times bestseller. Although mostly positive, some critics were unimpressed by the venture of this book. According to Financial Times, "this novel almost bends under the weight of history but never breaks". According to The Washington Post "there's a neatness to this story that the standards of romantic comedy demand but the history of these characters won't allow."
