= The House of the Spirits =

Novel by Isabel Allende

- First edition
- Author: Isabel Allende
- Original title: La casa de los espiritus
- Translator: Magda Bogin
- Cover artist: Jordi Sánchez (1982); Michel Guiré-Vaka (1985)
- Language: Spanish
- Genre: Autobiographical novel, Magical realism
- Set in: Chile, 1910s–1970s
- Publisher: Plaza & Janés, S.A. (Spain); Alfred A. Knopf (U.S.); Bantam (US)
- Publication date: 1982
- Publication place: Chile
- Media type: Print (Hardback & Paperback)
- ISBN: 9788401380112
- OCLC: 25823349
- Dewey Decimal: 863.64
- LC Class: PQ8098.L54 C313

The House of the Spirits (Spanish: La casa de los espíritus, 1982) is the debut novel of Isabel Allende. The novel was rejected by several Spanish-language publishers before being published in Barcelona in 1982. It became an instant best-seller, was critically acclaimed, and catapulted Allende to literary stardom. The novel was named Best Novel of the Year in Chile in 1982, and Allende received the country's Panorama Literario award. The House of the Spirits has been translated into over 20 languages.

The book was first conceived by Allende when she received news that her 100-year-old grandfather was dying. She began to write him a letter that ultimately became the manuscript of The House of the Spirits. Her novel is influenced by Gabriel García Márquez’s novel One Hundred Years of Solitude.

The story details the life of the Trueba family, spanning four generations, and tracing the post-colonial social and political upheavals of Chile – though the country's name and the names of figures closely paralleling historical ones, such as "the Candidate/President" (Salvador Allende) or "the Poet" (Pablo Neruda), are never explicitly given. The story is told mainly from the perspective of two protagonists (Esteban and Alba) and incorporates elements of magical realism.

== Plot summary ==
The story starts with the del Valle family, focusing upon the youngest and the eldest daughters of the family, Clara and Rosa. The youngest daughter, Clara del Valle, has paranormal powers and keeps a detailed diary of her life. Using her powers, Clara predicts that an accidental death will occur in the family. Shortly after this, Clara's sister, Rosa the Beautiful, is killed by poison intended for her father who is running for the Senate. Clara is shocked into muteness after witnessing the autopsy performed on her sister's body. Rosa's fiancé, a poor miner named Esteban Trueba, is devastated and attempts to mend his broken heart by devoting his life to restoring his family hacienda, Las Tres Marías, which has fallen into poverty and disrepair. He sends money to his spinster sister who takes care of their arthritic mother in town. Through a combination of intimidation and reward, he enforces respect and labor from the fearful peasants and turns Tres Marías into a "model hacienda". He turns the first peasant who spoke to him upon arrival, Pedro Segundo, into his foreman, who quickly becomes the closest thing that Trueba ever has to an actual friend during his life. He rapes many of the peasant women and children, and his first victim, then-15-year-old Pancha García, becomes the mother of his bastard son, Esteban García. Throughout the novel, he visits Transito Soto, a prostitute. With Esteban's help, she becomes a wildly successful brothel madam in the city and always is willing to repay the favor to him.

Esteban returns to the city to see his dying mother. After her death, Esteban decides to fulfill her dying wish for him to marry and have legitimate children. He goes to the Del Valle family to ask for Clara's hand in marriage. Clara accepts Esteban's proposal; she herself has predicted her engagement two months prior, speaking for the first time in nine years. During the period of their engagement, Esteban builds what everyone calls "the big house on the corner", a large mansion in the city where the Trueba family will live for generations. After their wedding, Esteban's sister Férula comes to live with the newlyweds in the big house on the corner. Férula develops a strong dedication to Clara, which fulfills her need to serve others. However, Esteban's wild desire to possess Clara and to monopolize her love causes him to throw Férula out of the house. She curses him, telling him that he will shrink in body and soul, and die like a dog. Although she misses her sister-in-law, Clara is unable to find her by any means - the gap between her and her husband widens as she devotes more time to her daughter and the mystic arts.

Clara gives birth to a daughter named Blanca and later, to twin boys Jaime and Nicolás. The family, which resides in the capital, stays at the hacienda during the summertime. Upon arriving at Tres Marías for the first time, Blanca immediately befriends a young boy named Pedro Tercero, who is the son of her father's foreman. Blanca and Pedro grow up together as best friends despite them being of two different social and economic classes. During their teenage years, Blanca and Pedro Tercero eventually become lovers. After an earthquake that destroys part of the hacienda and leaves Esteban injured, the Truebas move permanently to Las Tres Marías. Clara spends her time teaching, caring for her husband's battered body, and writing in her journals while Blanca is sent to a convent school and the twin boys back to an English boarding school, both of which are located in the city. Blanca fakes an illness so as to be sent back to Las Tres Marías, where she can be with Pedro Tercero, but when she arrives home she finds that Pedro Tercero has been banished from the hacienda by Esteban on account of his revolutionary socialist ideas. Pedro Tercero meets with Blanca in secret adopting disguises while also spreading his ideas in the form of song to neighboring haciendas.

A visiting French count to the hacienda, Jean de Satigny, reveals Blanca's nightly romps with Pedro Tercero to her father. Esteban furiously goes after his daughter and brutally whips her. When Clara expresses horror at his actions, Esteban slaps her, knocking out her front teeth. Clara decides to never speak to him again, reclaims her maiden name and moves out of Tres Marías and back to the city, taking Blanca with her. Esteban, furious and lonely, blames Pedro Tercero for the whole matter; putting a price on the boy's head with the corrupt local police. At this point, Pedro Segundo deserts Esteban, telling him he does not want to be around when Trueba inevitably catches his son. Enraged by Pedro Segundo's departure, Trueba begins hunting for Pedro Tercero himself, eventually tracking him down to a small shack near his hacienda. He only succeeds in cutting off three of Pedro's fingers, and is filled with regret for his uncontrollable furies.

Blanca finds out she is pregnant with Pedro Tercero's child. Esteban, desperate to save the family honor, gets Blanca to marry the French count by telling her that he has killed Pedro Tercero. At first, Blanca gets along with her new husband, but she leaves him when she discovers his participation in sexual fantasies with the servants. Blanca quietly returns to the Trueba household and gives birth to her daughter, Alba. Meanwhile, Jaime and Nicholas both fall in love with a young drug addict named Amanda; Amanda initially loves Nicholas and becomes pregnant with his child. Jaime has to perform an abortion, ruining his relationship with Nicholas. Amanda and her little brother Miguel stay for a short time at the Trueba house; Miguel is able to witness Alba's birth, his future lover.

Esteban Trueba eventually moves to the Trueba house in the capital as well, although he continues to spend periods of time in Tres Marías. He becomes isolated from every member of his family except for little Alba, whom he is very fond of. Esteban runs as a senator for the Conservative Party but is nervous about whether or not he will win. Clara speaks to him, through signs, informing him that "those who have always won will win again" – this becomes his motto. Clara then begins to speak to Esteban through signs, although she keeps her promise and never actually speaks to him again. A few years later, Clara dies peacefully and Esteban is overwhelmed with grief.

Alba is a solitary child who enjoys playing make-believe in the basement of the house and painting the walls of her room. Blanca has become very poor since leaving Jean de Satigny's house, getting a small income out of selling pottery and giving pottery classes to mentally ill children, and is once again dating Pedro Tercero, now a revolutionary singer/songwriter. Alba and Pedro are fond of each other, but do not know they are father and daughter, although Pedro suspects this. Alba is also fond of her uncles. Nicolás is eventually kicked out by his father, supposedly moving to North America.

When she is older, Alba attends a local college where she meets Miguel, now a grown man, and becomes his lover. Miguel is a revolutionary, and out of love for him, Alba involves herself in student protests against the conservative government. After the victory of the People's Party (a socialist movement), Alba celebrates with Miguel.

Fearing a Communist dictatorship, Esteban Trueba and his fellow politicians plan a military coup of the socialist government. However, when the military coup is set into action, the military men relish their power and grow out of control. Esteban's son Jaime is killed by power-driven soldiers along with other supporters of the government. After the coup, people are regularly kidnapped and tortured. Esteban helps Blanca and Pedro Tercero flee to Canada, where the couple finally find their happiness.

The military regime attempts to eliminate all traces of opposition and eventually comes for Alba. She is made the prisoner of Colonel Esteban García, the son of Esteban Trueba's and Pancha Garcia's illegitimate son, and hence the grandson of Esteban Trueba. During an earlier visit to the Trueba house, García had molested Alba as a child. In pure hatred of her privileged life and eventual inheritance, García tortures Alba repeatedly, looking for information on Miguel. He rapes her, thus completing the cycle that Esteban Trueba put into motion when he raped Pancha García. When Alba loses her will to live, she is visited by Clara's spirit who tells her not to wish for death, since it can easily come, but to wish to live. She begins to write down her family's story in her mind.

García, fearful of his growing attachment to Alba, discards her. Esteban Trueba manages to free Alba with the help of Miguel and Tránsito Soto, his old friend and the brothel madam. After helping Alba write their memoir, Esteban Trueba dies in the arms of Alba, accompanied by Clara's spirit; he is smiling, having avoided Férula's prophecy that he will die like a dog. Alba is pregnant, though whether the child is Miguel's or the product of her rape is unknown. Alba embraces this ambiguity, however, loving her unborn child as above all, it is her own. Alba resolves that she will not seek vengeance on those who have injured her, choosing to believe in the hope that one day the human cycle of hate and revenge will be broken. Alba is revealed to be the narrator of the novel, which she writes while she waits for Miguel and for the birth of her child.

== Main characters ==
Some of the characters' names are significant, particularly the women's names, which often indicate the personalities of the characters. The names Nívea, Clara, Blanca, and Alba are more or less synonyms, and this is mentioned as a family tradition. (Nívea means snow-white, and can be translated as "white" as can all the others, though they have specific meanings.) Férula's name means "rod" in Latin; when used in Spanish it refers to an object used to immobilize a limb, such as a splint or cast.

=== Clara del Valle Trueba ===
Clara (one of its translations is the equivalent of English 'clear', although it is also a common female name) is the key female figure in the novel. She is a clairvoyant and telekinetic who is rarely attentive to domestic tasks, but she holds her family together with her love for them and her uncanny predictions. She is the youngest daughter of Severo and Nívea del Valle, wife of Esteban Trueba, and mother of Blanca, Jaime, and Nicolás. Even as a child her strangeness is noticed and seen as a threat to many in her community. Otherwise, her family and devoted Nanny protect her from her strangeness. She and her uncle Marcos use her powers to run a fortune-telling centre as she develops other paranormal activities like dream reading. Her uncle eventually leaves in a primitive airplane he built himself, disappearing for many months, assumed dead but later is found to die instead as the result of a 'mysterious African plague' contracted during his travels. Clara practices divining and moving inanimate objects, most notably a three-legged table, and she is surrounded by friends such as the psychic Mora sisters and The Poet. Severo and Nívea del Valle are main characters in another Allende novel. As Clara grows up, she develops her abilities and is even able to communicate with ghosts and spirits. Clara represents love and cherishment. Clara's marriage to Esteban Trubea is something she accepts but she never truly loves him and knows from the beginning that she will never do so. She is uninterested in material things and takes for granted her own high economic standing. It is not until later, after great tragedy, that she takes the role of helper/servant instead of dreamy bystander.

=== Esteban Trueba ===
Esteban Trueba is the central male character of the novel and is one of the story's main narrators along with his granddaughter Alba. In his youth, he seeks the mermaid-like and green-haired Rosa the Beautiful, daughter of Severo and Nívea del Valle, toiling in the mines to earn a suitable fortune so that he can support her. However, she dies by accidental poisoning while he is working in the mines, a cruel stroke of fate that hardens his heart. He works hard to develop his estate at Tres Marias ('Three Marys', a nickname for Orion's Belt), and seduces and rapes many local peasant women, fathering many illegitimate children, including Esteban García (by Pancha García, sister of Pedro Segundo). Although he eventually marries Clara (Rosa's sister and youngest daughter of the Del Valles) and raises a large family, Esteban's stubborn and violent ways alienate all those around him. Esteban has a tense relationship with his daughter Blanca but shows genuine love and devotion to his granddaughter Alba. Despite his often violent behavior, he is also devoted to his wife Clara, entering into a state of permanent mourning following her death. As a self-made man who earned all of his wealth from years of work spent improving Tres Marías, Esteban scorns communists and believes them to be lazy and stupid. Later in life, he turns to politics where he spends his money and effort trying to prevent the rising Socialist movement within the country. However, after the military coup he loses much of his power and suddenly has to face the fact that he has become an old and weak man. Yet it is not the loss of power, so much as the injury done to his country, that agonizes the highly patriotic Esteban. His realization that he desires the love of his family and peace in his country leads to a pivotal change in his character. In his last days, he slowly loses the rage that has been driving him all his life. He begins to make amends to the remaining members of his family—first, by helping Blanca and Pedro Tercero escape the country so they can live happily, and then, after Alba is kidnapped by the military, by persuading his longtime friend Tránsito Soto (who has influence in the military) to help him rescue her. With the success of both of his efforts, Esteban dies happily, knowing that he has achieved Clara's posthumous forgiveness.

=== Blanca Trueba ===
Blanca (literally 'white') is Clara and Esteban's first-born daughter. She spends her childhood between the Truebas' house in the capital and Tres Marías, where she forms an intense connection with a boy named Pedro Tercero García, the son of Esteban's foreman. Their friendship endures, though they only see each other in the summer, and upon adolescence they become lovers. Their love persists even after Pedro is run out of the hacienda by Esteban, because he is putting communist ideas in the other workers' heads. After she becomes pregnant with Pedro Tercero's child, her father forces her to marry Count Jean de Satigny, whom she does not love. After Blanca leaves the Count and returns to the Trueba home, she sees Pedro sporadically, resisting his attempts to persuade her to marry, but their relationship continues. Blanca's reconciliation with her father eventually allows her to flee to Canada with Pedro, where they finally are able to achieve happiness together. Blanca is also able to earn large amounts of money for the first time by selling her clay figurines, which are seen as folk art by Canadians.

=== Pedro Tercero García ===
Pedro is the son of the tenant and foreman of Tres Marías, Pedro Segundo García. At a young age, he falls in love with Blanca and is the father of her only child, Alba. In his youth, he spreads socialist ideals to the workers on the hacienda, and later he becomes a revolutionary and a songwriter (his character may be modeled after revolutionary songwriter Victor Jara). After the coup d'état in his country, he and Blanca exile themselves to Canada with Esteban's help. It is mentioned that he resumes his political crusade during his exile in Canada where his music is embraced in translation even if "chickens and foxes are underdeveloped creatures" in comparison with the "eagles and wolves" of the North.

=== Alba Trueba de Satigny ===
Alba (Spanish for 'Dawn', Latin for 'white') is the daughter of Blanca and Pedro Tercero García, although for many years of her life she was led to believe that Count de Satigny was her father. From before her birth, her grandmother Clara decreed that she was blessed by the stars. Because of this, Clara said she didn't need to go to school; as a result, Alba was raised at home until she was seven. The novel ends with Esteban's death, and Alba sits alone in the vast Trueba mansion beside his body. The last paragraph reveals that she is pregnant, although she does not know whether the child is Miguel's or the product of the rapes that she endured at the hands of security police, during her imprisonment.

=== Severo and Nívea del Valle ===
Severo (literally 'severe') and Nívea ('snowy') are the parents of Rosa, Clara, and several other children. Severo's candidacy for the Liberal Party of Chile promptly came to an end after someone tried to poison him, but killed his daughter Rosa instead. Nívea, however, would come to become a prominent social activist for women's liberation. The couple pass away in a gruesome car accident in which Nívea is decapitated and her head lost. The details of the accident were hidden from their daughter Clara, because she was pregnant at the time. However, her intuition brings her to the location of the lost head, which ends up being hidden in the basement since the body had already been buried.

=== The Nanny ===
Having served the Del Valle and Trueba families all her life, Nana is emotionally close to all the children that she has taken care of, especially Clara. She even takes care of Clara's children after Severo's and Nívea's death. Nana passes away in an earthquake and is buried without fanfare. Her body is later moved to the mausoleum with Clara's and Rosa's bodies.

=== Rosa del Valle ===
The oldest daughter of Severo and Nívea, Rosa was born with green hair, gold eyes and great beauty. Her unearthly beauty intimidates everyone in the village except for Esteban Trueba, who is deeply enamored of her and seeks her hand in marriage. Rosa waits patiently while Esteban slowly accumulates wealth by working in the mines so that he will feel worthy of Rosa. Esteban returns to find that Rosa has died from a dose of poison meant for her father. Though never truly forgetting Rosa, Esteban marries her sister Clara instead.

=== Jaime and Nicolás Trueba ===
Jaime and Nicolás are Clara and Esteban's sons and Blanca's brothers. As they grow, their relationship with their father Esteban becomes more and more strained. Nicolás becomes a guru and a Jaime a medical doctor.

== Publication history ==
- La casa de los espíritus (Barcelona: Plaza & Janés, 1982) First edition. ISBN 84-01-38011-1
- The House of The Spirits (Westminster, Maryland: Knopf, 12 April 1985) First English language edition. Translated by Magda Bogin. ISBN 0-394-53907-9
- The House of The Spirits (London: Jonathan Cape, 4 July 1985) First UK edition. Translated by Magda Bogin. ISBN 0-224-02231-8
- The House of The Spirits (New York: Bantam, 1986) First US paperback edition. Translated by Magda Bogin. ISBN 0-553-27391-4
- The House of The Spirits (London: Black Swan, 1986) First UK paperback edition. Translated by Magda Bogin. ISBN 0-552-99198-8

== School curricula ==
The novel has been taught in a significant number of school curricula around the world, notably for its use of magical realism, and as a translated Latin American novel. Educational organizations such as the International Baccalaureate recognize it as a world literature study book.

=== Censorship in the United States ===
The House of the Spirits has been challenged for its usage in United States school curriculum on multiple occasions, most often for the stated reasons of explicit sexual content and depictions of violence. In 1997 a Virginia parent initially brought attention to the novel’s explicit content by passing out “packets of excerpts from The House of Spirits with the heading “Would you allow your 16-year-old daughter to read this material? And if not, why should the public school be allowed to require my 16-year-old daughter to read this material?” Despite this demonstration, the Virginia county’s school board voted not to ban the novel from school curriculum. Similarly, in Maryland, the novel was brought to the attention of the school board in Montgomery County for its explicit content, specifically the depiction of necrophilia—“in which a young medical student kisses a female corpse,” referring to the molestation of the body of Rosa the Beautiful. In California counties in 1999 and 2000, the novel was challenged for its anti-Christian views, pornographic depictions, and “violence and sexual abuse”.

== Traditions ==
After the debut of The House of the Spirits, Allende began to follow a rule of starting to write all her books on January 8. She is quoted as saying:

In January 8, 1981, I was living in Venezuela and I received a phone call that my beloved grandfather was dying. I began a letter for him that later became my first novel, The House of The Spirits. It was such a lucky book from the very beginning, that I kept that lucky date to start.

== Film, theatrical and television adaptations ==
In 1993, the book was adapted into a film by Danish director Bille August. The movie starred Jeremy Irons as Esteban Trueba, Meryl Streep as Clara del Valle Trueba, Winona Ryder as Blanca Trueba, Glenn Close as Férula Trueba and Antonio Banderas as Pedro Tercero García. While the film won some minor international awards, it was widely viewed as a critical failure. Two oft-cited reasons were its diffusely episodic structure and its cast of mostly Anglo-American actors in Latin American roles. The film grossed $4.8 million in its first two weeks of release in Germany and went on to gross more than $55 million in Europe. In the United States and Canada, it grossed $6 million.

A theatrical adaptation of the novel was presented at Seattle's Book-It Repertory Theatre in 2007.

The novel has also been adapted for the theater in a version written by Caridad Svich, which was commissioned by Repertorio Espanol in New York City. That adaptation premiered in 2009 and received the HOLA Award for Outstanding Achievement in Playwriting from the Hispanic Organization of Latin Actors. Unlike the film and the previous adaptation, this version was written and performed in Spanish and has been staged in Latin American countries such as Chile and Costa Rica. Svich also wrote an English language version of the play which won the 2011 American Theatre Critics Association Primus Prize for its production at Denver Center Theatre Company in 2010.

On May 23, 2018, it was announced that Hulu was developing a television series adaptation of the novel with production company FilmNation Entertainment. Allende is expected to serve as an executive producer on the project. On October 19, 2021, it was announced that Eva Longoria would star in the project. In 2024, Amazon MGM Studios gave the green-light to the project. In 2026, the novel was adapted into an 8-part television miniseries starring Alfonso Herrera as Esteban Trueba, Dolores Fonzi as Clara del Valle Cortés and Rochi Hernández as Alba Satigny Trueba. The television series was released on April 29, 2026 on Amazon Prime Video. Longoria remained in the project as executive producer.
