= Dulce Chacón =

Spanish poet, novelist and playwright

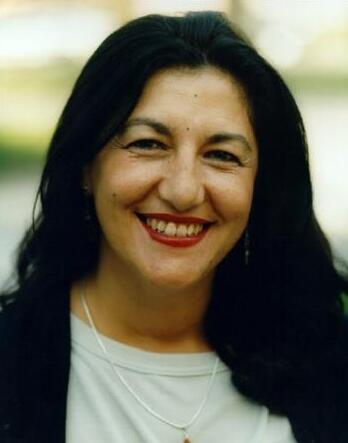
- Born: Dulce Chacón Gutiérrez; 3 June 1954; Zafra, Extremadura, Spain
- Died: 3 December 2003 (aged 49); Brunete, Spain
- Occupations: Poet, novelist, playwright
- Years active: 1992–2003

Dulce Chacón (3 June 1954 – 3 December 2003) was a Spanish poet, novelist and playwright.

== Biography ==
Born into a traditional family in the Extremadura region of Spain, her family moved to Madrid upon her father's death, when she was 12 years old.

In spite of growing up in a conservative family, Dulce Chacón soon became a leftist, due to the victims caused by the Spanish dictatorship. Her motto towards this issue was “neither bitterness nor oblivion”.

Chacón started writing at an early age even though she did not publish until 1992 when her first book of poetry, Querrán ponerle nombre, appeared. Two more books of poetry then followed: Las palabras de la piedra and Contra el desprestigio de la altura, in 1993 and 1995 respectively. The latter won her the Ciudad de Irún Prize. In 1996 she published her first novel, Algún amor que no mate, which is about a woman abused by her husband. José Saramago described it as “harsh but necessary”.

Consequently, she involved herself in various progressive social and political activities. Her novel La voz dormida (The sleeping voice), which gathers testimonies of women who took part in the republican side during the Spanish Civil War, attracted widespread acclaim. In regards to the 2003 invasion of Iraq, Chacón joined a cultural movement against war. There she went along to read aloud, alongside Nobel prize winner José Saramago, the anti-war manifesto at the 15 March 2003 mass demonstration in Madrid against the war. She was also a member of an association for women against gender-based violence.

Her husband, Miguel Ángel Alcántara, would define her as a determined, leftist, agnostic woman, whose best weapons were words and writing.

She died in Madrid on 3 December 2003, only one month after learning she had pancreatic cancer that had spread to her liver.

== Awards and recognition ==
- Premio de Poesía Ciudad de Irún, for Contra el desprestigio de la altura, 1995
- XXIV Premio Azorín, for Cielos de barro, 2000
- Premio Libro del Año 2002, for La voz Dormida

== Works ==
=== Poetry ===
- Querrán ponerle nombre (1992)
- Las palabras de la piedra (1993)
- Contra el desprestigio de la altura (1995)
- Matar al ángel (1999)
- Cuatro gotas (2003)

=== Novels ===
- Algún amor que no mate (1996)
- Blanca vuela mañana
- Háblame, musa, de aquel varón (1998)
- Cielos de barro (2000)
- La voz dormida (2002)

=== Theatre ===
- Algún amor que no mate
- Segunda mano 1998

=== Short stories ===
- "Te querré hasta la muerte" 2003, pp. 61–64.
