= Isabel Allende =

Chilean-American writer (born 1942)

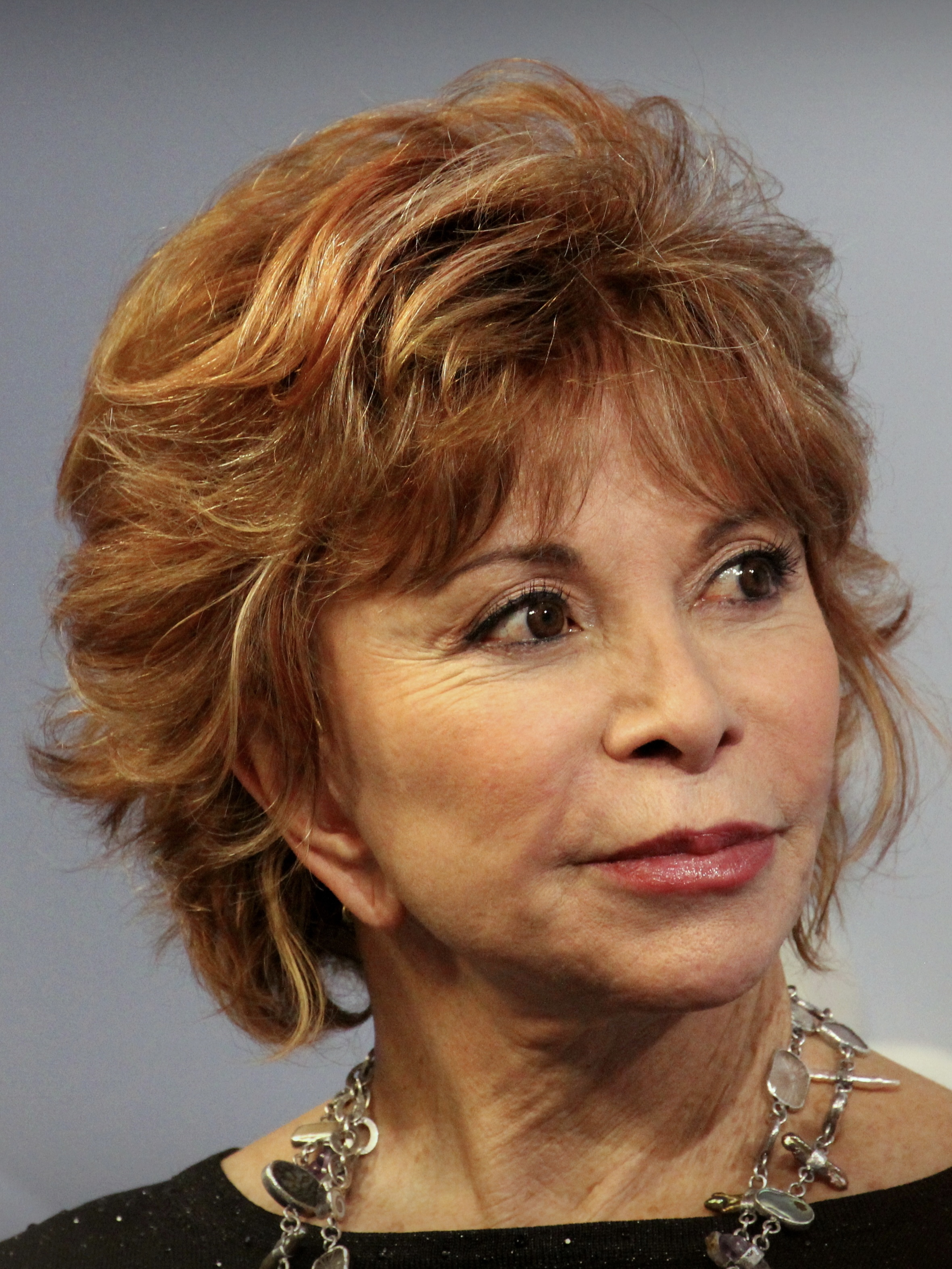
- Allende in Germany, 2015
- Born: Isabel Angélica Allende Llona; 2 August 1942 (age 84); Lima, Peru
- Citizenship: Chile; United States
- Occupations: Author; journalist
- Spouses: Miguel Frías (m. 1962; div. 1987) William C. Gordon (m. 1988; div. 2015) Roger Cukras (m. 2019)
- Children: 2; including Paula
- Relatives: Allende family
- Writing career
- Language: Spanish
- Notable awards: National Prize for Literature; Presidential Medal of Freedom
- Website: www.isabelallende.com

Isabel Angélica Allende Llona (Spanish: [isaˈβel aˈʝende]; born 2 August 1942) is a Chilean-American writer. Allende, whose works sometimes contain aspects of the magical realism genre, is known for novels such as The House of the Spirits (La casa de los espíritus, 1982) and City of the Beasts (La ciudad de las bestias, 2002), which have been commercially successful. Allende has been called "the world's most widely read Spanish-language author." In 2004, Allende was inducted into the American Academy of Arts and Letters, and in 2010, she received Chile's National Literature Prize. President Barack Obama awarded her the 2014 Presidential Medal of Freedom.

Allende's novels are often based upon her personal experience and historical events and pay homage to the lives of women, while weaving together elements of myth and realism. She has lectured and toured U.S. colleges to teach literature. Fluent in English, Allende was granted United States citizenship in 1993, having lived in California since 1989.

== Early life ==
Allende was born in Lima, Peru, in 1942, the daughter of Francisca Llona Barros called "Doña Panchita" (the daughter of Agustín Llona Cuevas and Isabel Barros Moreira, of Portuguese descent) and Tomás Allende, who was at the time a second secretary at the Chilean embassy. Her father Tomás was a first cousin of Salvador Allende, President of Chile from 1970 to 1973.

In 1945, after Tomás left them, Isabel's mother relocated with her three children to Santiago, Chile, where they lived until 1953. In 1953 Allende's mother married Ramón Huidobro and the family moved often. Huidobro was a diplomat appointed to Bolivia and Beirut. In La Paz, Bolivia, Allende attended an American private school; and in Beirut, Lebanon, she attended an English private school. The family returned to Chile in 1958, where Allende was also briefly home-schooled. In her youth, she read widely, particularly the works of William Shakespeare.

In 1970, Salvador Allende appointed Huidobro as ambassador to Argentina.

== Career ==
Before writing books, Allende worked with the United Nations Food and Agriculture Organization in Santiago, then in Brussels, and elsewhere in Europe from 1959 to 1965. For a short time in Chile, she also had a job translating romance novels from English to Spanish. However, she was fired for making unauthorized changes to the dialogue of the heroines to make them sound more intelligent, as well as altering the Cinderella ending to allow the heroines to find more independence and do good in the world.

=== Exile in Venezuela ===
In 1973, Salvador Allende was overthrown in a coup led by General Augusto Pinochet. Isabel found herself arranging safe passage for people on the "wanted lists", which she continued to do until her mother and stepfather narrowly escaped assassination. When she herself was added to the list and began receiving death threats, she fled to Venezuela, where she stayed for 13 years. It was during this time that Allende wrote her debut novel The House of the Spirits (1982). Allende has stated her move from Chile made her a serious writer: "I don't think I would be a writer if I had stayed in Chile. I would be trapped in the chores, in the family, in the person that people expected me to be." Allende believed that, being female in a patriarchal family, she was not expected to be a "liberated" person. Her history of oppression and liberation is thematically found in much of her fiction, where women contest the ideals of patriarchal leaders. In Venezuela she was a columnist for El Nacional, a major national newspaper.

=== Journalism ===
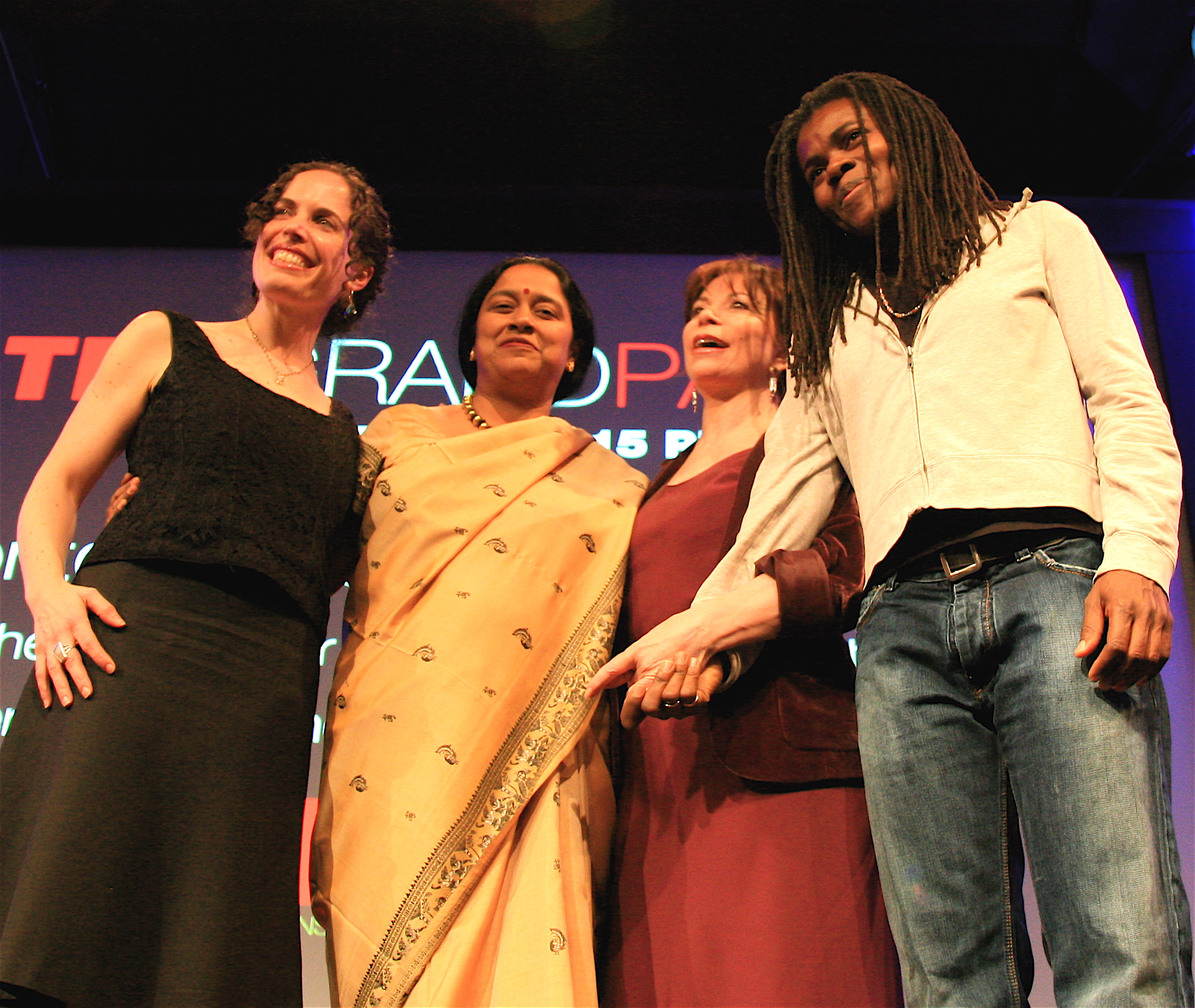
Allende (in red, 3rd L to R), 2007, at TED in California, flanked (L to R) by June Cohen, Lakshmi Pratury and Tracy Chapman

Beginning in 1967, Allende was on the editorial staff of Paula magazine and the children's magazine Mampato from 1969 to 1974, where she later became the editor. She published two children's stories, "La Abuela Panchita" and "Lauchas y Lauchones", as well as a collection of articles, Civilice a Su Troglodita. She also worked in Chilean television production for channels 7 and 13 from 1970 to 1974. As a journalist, she once sought an interview with poet Pablo Neruda. Neruda agreed to the interview, and he told her that she had too much imagination to be a journalist and should be a novelist instead. He also advised her to compile her satirical columns in book form. She did so, and this became her first published book. In 1973, Allende's play El Embajador played in Santiago a few months before she was forced to flee the country due to the coup.

During her time in Venezuela, Allende was a freelance journalist for El Nacional in Caracas from 1976 to 1983 and an administrator of the Marrocco School in Caracas from 1979 to 1983.

=== Author ===
In 1977, while in Caracas, Allende received a phone call informing her that her 99-year-old grandfather was near death, and she sat down to write him a letter, hoping to thereby "keep him alive, at least in spirit." The letter evolved into a book, The House of the Spirits (1982); this work intended to exorcise the ghosts of the Pinochet dictatorship. The book was rejected by numerous Latin American publishers, but eventually published in Barcelona. The book soon ran to more than two dozen editions in Spanish and was translated into a score of languages. Allende was compared to Gabriel García Márquez as an author in the style known as magical realism.

Although Allende is often cited as a practitioner of magical realism, her works also display elements of post-Boom literature. Allende also holds to a very strict writing routine. She writes on a computer, working Monday to Saturday, 09:00 to 19:00. "I always start on 8 January", Allende stated, "a tradition she began in 1981 with the letter she wrote to her dying grandfather that would become The House of the Spirits."

Allende's book Paula (1995) is a memoir of her childhood in Santiago and the years she spent in exile. It is written as an anguished letter to her daughter. In 1991 an error in Paula's medication resulted in severe brain damage, leaving her in a persistent vegetative state. Allende spent months at Paula's bedside before learning that a hospital mishap had caused the brain damage. Allende had Paula moved to a hospital in California where she died on 6 December 1992.

Allende's novels have been translated into more than 42 languages and sold more than 77 million copies. Her 2008 book, The Sum of Our Days, is a memoir. It focuses on her life with her family, which includes her grown son, Nicolás; second husband, William Gordon; and several grandchildren. A novel set in New Orleans, Island Beneath the Sea, was published in 2010. In 2011 came El cuaderno de Maya (Maya's Notebook), in which the setting alternates between Berkeley, California, and Chiloé in Chile, as well as Las Vegas, Nevada.

== Reception ==
Latino Leaders Magazine called her a "literary legend" in a 2007 article naming her the third most influential Latino leader in the world.

Her work has drawn some negative criticism. In an article published in Entre paréntesis, Roberto Bolaño called Allende's literature anemic, comparing it to "a person on his deathbed", and later called her "a writing machine, not a writer". Literary critic Harold Bloom said that Allende only "reflects a determinate period, and that afterwards everybody will have forgotten her". Novelist Gonzalo Contreras said that "she commits a grave error, to confuse commercial success with literary quality".

Allende told El Clarín that she recognizes she has not always received good reviews in Chile, stating that Chilean intellectuals "detest" her. However, she disagrees with these assessments:

The fact people think that when you sell a lot of books you are not a serious writer is a great insult to the readership. I get a little angry when people try to say such a thing. There was a review of my last book in one American paper by a professor of Latin American studies and he attacked me personally for the sole reason that I sold a lot of books. That is unforgivable.

It has been said that "Allende's impact on Latin American and world literature cannot be overestimated." The Los Angeles Times called Allende "a genius", and she has received many international awards, including the Dorothy and Lillian Gish Prize, granted to writers "who have contributed to the beauty of the world ".

== Honors ==
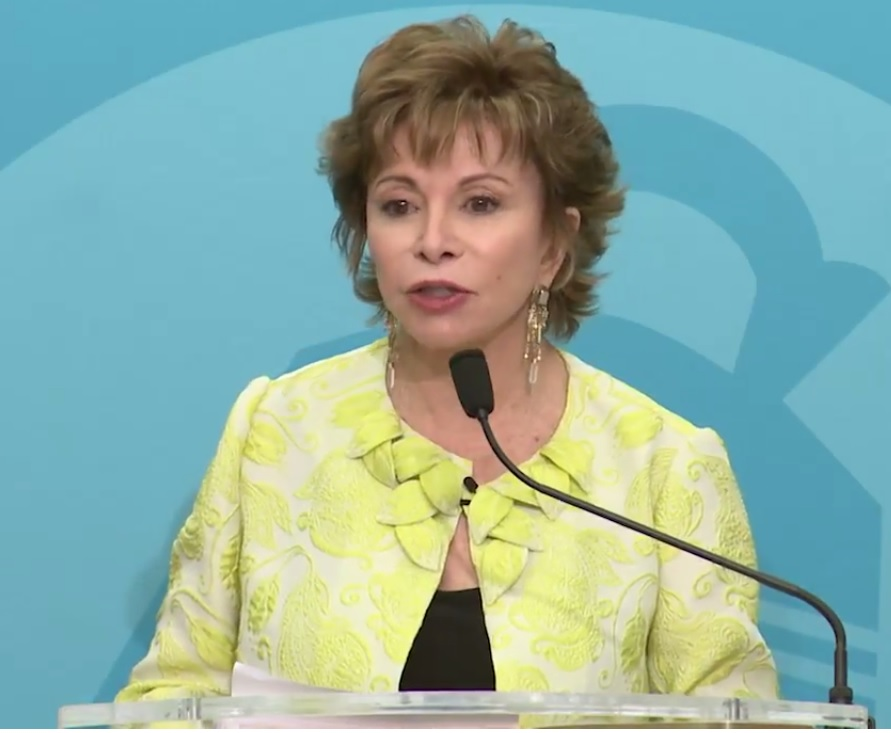
Allende speaks to the City Club of Cleveland, 8 September 2017.

In 2006, she was one of the eight flag bearers at the Opening Ceremony of the Winter Olympics in Turin, Italy. She presented the talk Tales of Passion at TED 2007. In 2008, Allende received the honorary degree Doctor of Humane Letters from San Francisco State University for her "distinguished contributions as a literary artist and humanitarian." In 1994, she was awarded the Gabriela Mistral Order of Merit, the first woman to receive this honor. In 2014, Allende received the honorary degree of Doctor of Letters from Harvard University for her contributions to literature.

Isabel Allende has also won the €1 million Premio Planeta literary prize for La hora antes del alba, a forthcoming novel that returns to the world of her 1982 debut, The House of the Spirits.

== Politics ==
Allende has been a life-long feminist; describing herself as "a feminist in kindergarten", she was expelled from school for insubordination, after she had observed how much more privileged her brothers already were. She also supports abortion rights.

Although not as openly political as some of her contemporary writers, she expressed contempt for Donald Trump and his policies following his election in 2016, and she later endorsed Democrat Joe Biden during the 2020 presidential election. In 2025, Allende again criticized Trump, accusing him of misogyny, homophobia and transphobia, stating "The Supreme Court has been stripping away women’s rights, as well as those of trans people and the LGBTQ+ community. They are eliminating rights, and it’s very difficult. Whenever the opportunity arises, they take something away from women. That’s why we must always stay vigilant. Look at what’s happening in Afghanistan—the Taliban took over, and within 24 hours, women lost everything, absolutely everything."

After Henry Kissinger's death in November 2023, Allende described him as a "war criminal", due to his involvement in 1973 Chilean coup d'état. She said, "He was the mastermind behind the United States’ intervention in many countries. I know more about Latin America, but not only in Latin America but also in Africa and other places where democracies were replaced by dictatorships that would bend to the will of the United States."

Allende has expressed her support for the LGBTQ people, Black Lives Matter and MeToo movement.

== Foundation ==
Allende started the Isabel Allende Foundation on 9 December 1996, in honor of her daughter, Paula Frías Allende, who fell into a coma after complications of the disease porphyria led to her hospitalization. Paula was 29 years old when she died in 1992. The foundation is "dedicated to supporting programs that promote and preserve the fundamental rights of women and children to be empowered and protected."

== Personal life ==
Allende had finished her secondary studies while living in Chile, when she met engineering student Miguel Frías whom she married in 1962. They had two children, a son and a daughter. Reportedly, "Allende married early, into an Anglophile family and a kind of double life: at home she was the obedient wife and mother of two; in public she became, after a spell translating Barbara Cartland, a moderately well-known TV personality, a dramatist and a journalist on a feminist magazine." Allende's and Frías's daughter Paula was born in 1963; she died in 1992 at age 29. In 1966, Allende again returned to Chile, where her son Nicolás was born that year. In 1978, she began a temporary separation from Frías. She lived in Spain for two months, then returned to her marriage. She divorced Frías in 1987.

During a visit to California on a book tour in 1988, Allende met her second husband, California attorney and novelist William C. "Willie" Gordon. They married in July 1988. She separated from Gordon in April 2015.

In 2019, she married for the third time, to Roger Cukras, a lawyer from New York. Allende resides in San Rafael, California. Most of her family lives nearby, with her son, his second wife, and her grandchildren just down the hill, in the house she and her second husband vacated.

== Awards ==
External videos
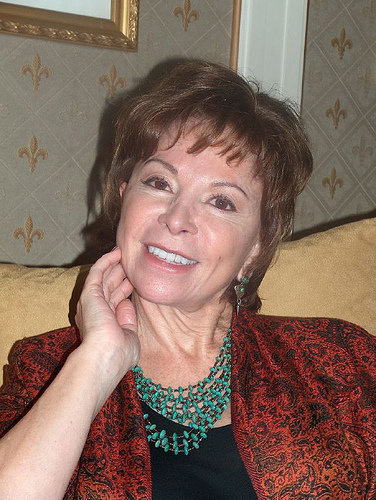
- Isabel Allende: Tales of passion, 18:00, TED Talks (2007)
- Isabel Allende, "Maya's Notebook" on YouTube, 56:00, talk begins at 4:10, UC Berkeley Events (2013)
- Isabel Allende: A Literary Life on YouTube, 23:30, National Geographic (2013)

- Novel of the Year (Chile, 1983)
- Panorama Literario (Chile, 1983)
- Author of the Year (Germany, 1984)
- Book of the Year (Germany, 1984)
- Grand Prix d'Evasion (France, 1984)
- Grand Prix de la Radio Télévision Belge (Point de Mire, 1985)
- Best Novel (Mexico, 1985)
- Colima Literary Prize (Mexico, 1986)
- Quality Paperback Book Club New Voice (United States; 1986 nominee)
- Author of the Year (Germany, 1986)
- XV Premio Internazionale I Migliori Dell'Anno (Italy, 1987)
- Premio Mulheres a la Mejor Novela Extranjera (Portugal, 1987)
- Los Angeles Times Book Prize nominee (United States, 1987)
- Library Journal's Best Book (United States, 1988)
- Before Columbus Foundation Award (United States, 1989)
- Orden al Mérito Docente y Cultural Gabriela Mistral (Chile, 1990)
- XLI Bancarella Literary Prize (Italy, 1993)
- Independent Foreign Fiction Award (England, June–July 1993)
- Brandeis University Major Book Collection Award (United States, 1993)
- Feminist of the Year Award, The Feminist; Majority Foundation (United States, 1994)
- Chevalier des Artes et des Lettres distinction (France, 1994)
- Critics' Choice (United States, 1996)
- Books to Remember, American Library Association (United States, 1996)
- Hispanic Heritage Award in Literature (United States, 1996).
- Malaparte Amici di Capri (Italy, 1998)
- Donna Citta Di Roma (Italy, 1998)
- Dorothy and Lillian Gish Prize (United States, 1998)
- Sara Lee Foundation (United States, 1998)
- Premio Iberoamericano de Letras José Donoso, University of Talca (Chile, 2003)
- Inaugural class of winner of the Great Immigrants Award named by Carnegie Corporation of New York (July 2006)
- Premio Honoris Causa, Università di Trento en "lingue e letteratura moderne euroamericane" (Trento, Italy, May 2007)
- Chilean National Prize for Literature (Chile, 2010)
- Library of Congress Creative Achievement Award for Fiction (USA, 2010)
- Hans Christian Andersen Literature Award (Denmark, 2012)
- Presidential Medal of Freedom (United States, 2014)
- Anisfield-Wolf Book Award: Lifetime Achievement (United States, 2017)
- BBC 100 Women (United Kingdom, 2018)
- National Book Foundation Medal for Distinguished Contribution to American Letters (United States, 2018)
- Honorary Doctor of Humane Letters (L.H.D.) from Whittier College.
- Premio Planeta de Novela (Spain, 2026)

== Works ==
=== Fiction ===
- The House of the Spirits (1982) La casa de los espíritus
- The Porcelain Fat Lady (1984) La gorda de porcelana
- Of Love and Shadows (1984) De amor y de sombra
- Eva Luna (1987) Eva Luna
- Two Words (1989) Dos Palabras
- The Stories of Eva Luna (1989) Cuentos de Eva Luna
- The Infinite Plan (1991) El plan infinito
- Daughter of Fortune (1999) Hija de la fortuna
- Portrait in Sepia (2000) Retrato en sepia
- City of the Beasts (2002) La ciudad de las bestias
- Kingdom of the Golden Dragon (2003) El reino del dragón de oro
- Forest of the Pygmies (2004) El bosque de los pigmeos
- Zorro (2005) El Zorro: Comienza la leyenda
- Ines of My Soul (2006) Inés del alma mía
- Island Beneath the Sea (2009) La isla bajo el mar
- Maya's Notebook (2011) El Cuaderno de Maya
- Ripper (2014) El juego de Ripper
- The Japanese Lover (2015) El amante japonés
- In the Midst of Winter (2017) Más allá del invierno ISBN 1501178156
- A Long Petal of the Sea (2019) Largo pétalo de mar
- Violeta (2022)
- The Wind Knows My Name (2023)
- My Name Is Emilia del Valle (2025) Mi nombre es Emilia del Valle
- The Hour Before Dawn (2026) La hora antes del alba

=== Nonfiction ===
- Paula (1994) Paula ISBN 0060927216
- Aphrodite: A Memoir of the Senses (1998) Afrodita
- My Invented Country: A Memoir (2003) Mi país inventado
- The Sum of Our Days (2007) La suma de los días
- The Soul of a Woman (2021) Mujeres del alma mía ISBN 9780593355626
- Story Telling: A Writing Life (2026) La palabra mágica: Una vida escrita

== Sources ==
- Main, Mary. Isabel Allende, Award-Winning Latin American Author. Berkeley Heights, NJ: Enslow Publishing, 2005. – ISBN 0-7660-2488-1
- Bautista Gutierrez, Gloria, and Norma Corrales-Martin. Pinceladas Literarias Hispanoamericanas. Hoboken, NJ: Wiley, 2004.
