= Campo de Montiel (Ciudad Real) =

- Comarca
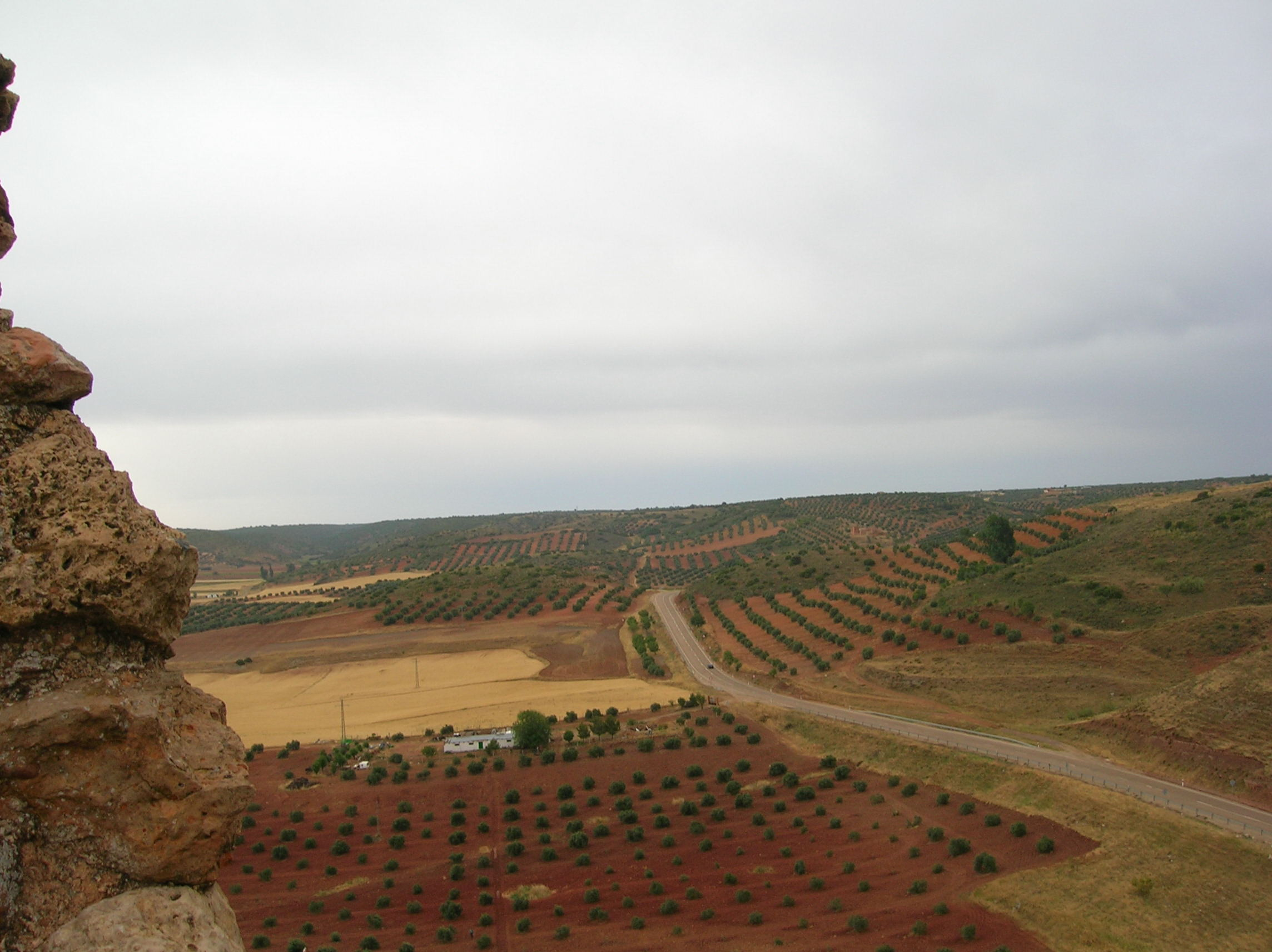
- View of the Campo de Montiel from the Castle of Alhambra.
- Interactive map of Campo de Montiel
- Country: Spain
- Autonomous community: Castile-La Mancha
- Province: Ciudad Real
- Municipalities: List: Albaladejo, Alcubillas, Alhambra, Almedina, Carrizosa, Castellar de Santiago, Cózar, Fuenllana, Membrilla, Montiel, Puebla del Príncipe, San Carlos del Valle, Santa Cruz de los Cáñamos, Terrinches, Torre de Juan Abad, Villanueva de la Fuente, Villanueva de los Infantes, Villahermosa, Villamanrique

Area
  - Total: 2,812.32 km^{2} (1,085.84 sq mi)

Population (2009)
  - Total: 27,903
  - Density: 9.9217/km^{2} (25.697/sq mi)
- Time zone: UTC+1 (CET)
  - Summer (DST): UTC+2 (CEST)

Campo de Montiel is a comarca (county, with no administrative role) in Castile-La Mancha, Spain.

Campo de Montiel is a Spanish region, integrated historically and geographically in La Mancha (specifically in the Lower Mancha), one to whose former province it belonged. It is formed mainly by municipalities that are in the southeast of the province of Ciudad Real, which is joined by the municipality of Ossa de Montiel, in the province of Albacete and geographically also others from that province. Both provinces are located in the autonomous community of Castilla-La Mancha.

== History ==
This region originated when the Order of Santiago received it as lordship, which founded three towns: Torre de Juan Abad, Alhambra and Montiel, each with numerous villages that later became independent. In the sixteenth century, King Felipe II consecrated this region by placing the county capital in Villanueva de los Infantes, as it was and is the geographic center of Campo de Montiel.

== See also ==
- Don Quixote
