= La Solana =

- Municipality
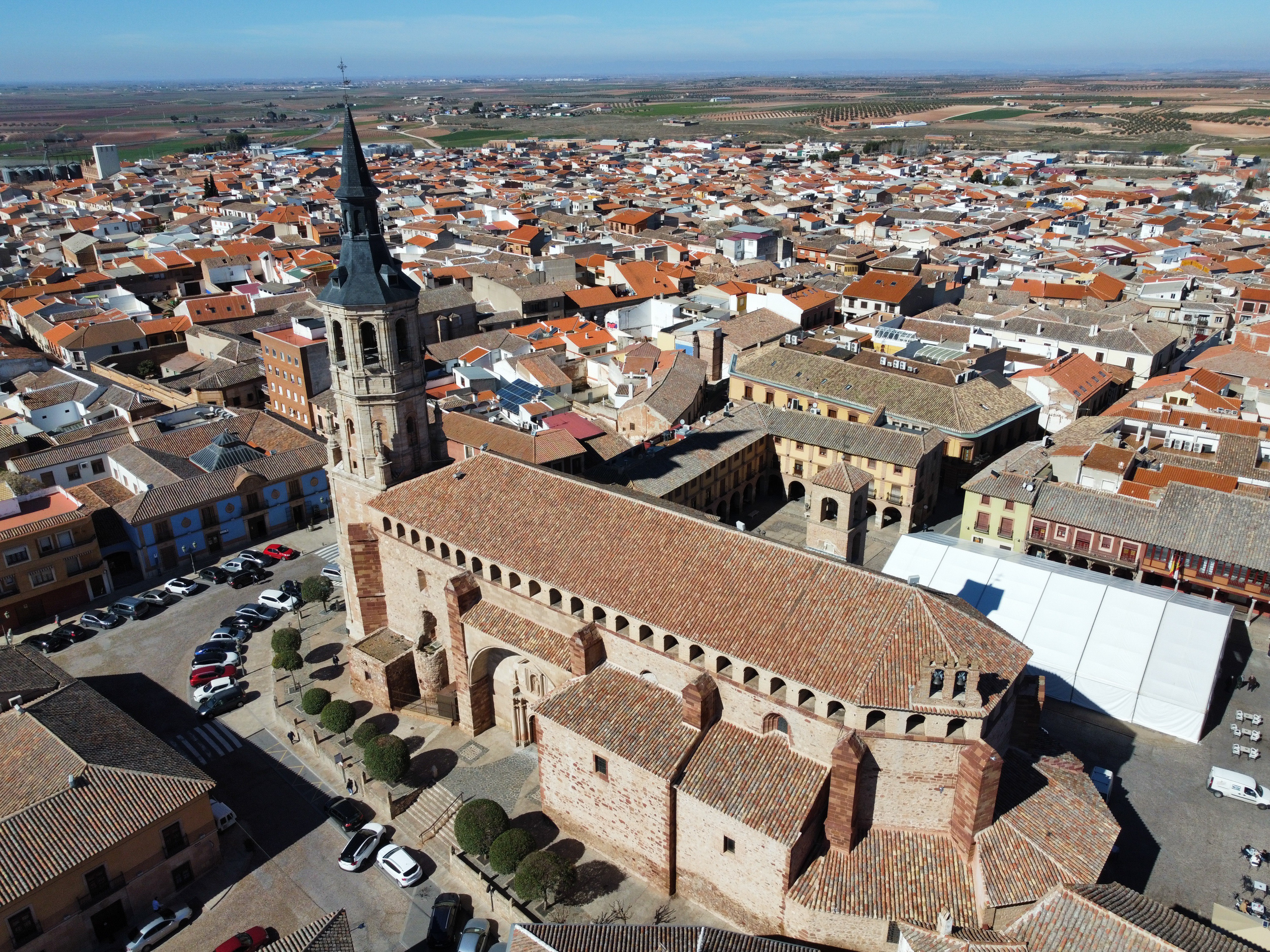

- Flag Coat of arms

- Location in mainland Spain
- Coordinates: 38°56′29″N 3°14′22″W
- Country: Spain
- Autonomous Community: Castilla–La Mancha
- Province: Ciudad Real

Government
  - Mayor: Eulalio Díaz-Cano (PSOE)

Area
  - Total: 134.18 km^{2} (51.81 sq mi)
- Elevation (AMSL): 745 m (2,444 ft)

Population (2025-01-01)
  - Total: 15,242
  - Density: 113.59/km^{2} (294.21/sq mi)
- Time zone: UTC+1 (CET)
  - Summer (DST): UTC+2 (CEST (GMT +2))
- Postal code: 13240
- Area code: +34 (Spain) + 926 (Ciudad Real)
- Website: www.lasolana.es

La Solana is a municipality in Ciudad Real, Castile-La Mancha, Spain. It has a population of 15,340. It has a very arid climate. It is located in a zone of Spain that produces large quantities of wine and olive oil.

== History ==
La Solana was settled, as with many other villages in the La Mancha region, thanks to the re-population carried out in the 13th century by the three Military Orders which received the territory that nowadays corresponds to the province of Ciudad Real: Santiago, Calatrava and San Juan. There is a belief, confirmed in the local writings, which date 1283 as the beginning of the occupation of the village. "Las Relaciones Topográficas de Felipe II," written in 1575, prove the existence of a tower which served as a fort to defend the people against the possible attacks of Muslims. This tower was probably constructed by the Order of Santiago (religious order) whose knight commander from 1440 to 1477 was Diego de Villegas. It is logical to think that the tower which is described in the Books of Visitors of the Order of Santiago is the same tower which is mentioned in "Las Relaciones de Felipe II", where the current tower of the Santa Catalina Church now stands.

The descriptions of cardenal Lorenzana from the year 1788 tell us that the first settlers were Sorian shepherds who came seasonally with their herds, and, attracted by the fertility of the lands of La Moheda and La Veguilla, which neighbor the historic center, moved their homes here and became the founding population. In 1463, according to Doctor Ángela Madrid Medina, it was granted the title of town. In 1468 there were about 200 residents, and, in 1575, 750 residents. Wine production, primarily red, was "famous in the local areas" to which it was exported. The neighboring town, Membrilla, was said in 1575 to have 1,000 residents, but based on the record of the tithes, it produced less wine that Solano, highlighting instead the products of the orchards situated in the plain of the river Azuer, which supplied La Solana. It is possible that the good wine from Membrilla that Miguel de Cervantes drank, and which would then appear in his Italian wine cellar, Licenciado Vidriera, was wine from La Solana.

La Solana, like everything in Campo de Montiel, belonged to the Orden de Santiago. However, the leadership of the Order changed substantially during the reign of the Reyes Católicos. The power of the Knight Commander and council diminished, and the kings themselves became "perpetual administrators by apostolic license" as they created an Order Council dependent on the crown. This ended the excessive economic and military power of the Commanders, which had intervened so much in the Crown's internal disputes; in addition, the administration of the territory became similar to the others of the realengo (certain towns that didn't belong to the Church), instituting governors and mayors, who brought government and the administration of justice to the towns of the Campo. Villanueva de los Infantes, situated 25 kilometers (15.5 mi) from La Solana, was chosen as the seat of government, relegating to second tier the historical and medieval center, Montiel, due to its stagnant growth and distance from the liveliest towns: Membrilla, La Solana, Villahermosa and La Torre de Juan Abad.

The name of La Solana, it is said in old writings, comes from a well called La Fuente de la Solana, used in the earlier days by shepherds and settlers. The name of the well was due to being near a spring, located on the sunny side of the small hill where the town was located. This area corresponds to the current Rasillo Santa Ana, where there is a small garden. A street of steps descends from there and meets another eastbound street that is called "de la Fuente". The street called "de la Fuente" in the cadastre of Marqués de La Ensenada from 1751 was actually the street of steps. The spring, called "the old font" in documents preserved in historical archives, continued to exist for centuries until it silted up. There is no record of how it happened or the location of the original well. Nevertheless, it is significant that the house that borders the street of steps on its west side, an old house belonging to the lineage of the gentlemen of the Pérez Cabellos, preserves an old cave with a spring of water inside of it stuck to the alley and to the street with the steps.

Afterwards, important events, such as the arrival of the Barefoot Friars Trinitarios in the 17th century, and the Barefoot Mothers Dominicas which founded their own convents.

In modern history, the "Century of the Sickles", el 20th, stands out, because La Solana became the center of manufacturing for these tools; however, because of current technology, this activity has fallen into decline.

In 1965 the Band of cctt de Ntro. Padre Jesús Rescatado was founded. The Band of Horns and Drums of Ntro. Padre Jesús Rescatado of La Solana was founded in 1965 by Antonio Serrano after the decision of the brotherhood to found its own Band of Horns and Trumpets. The band went on parade for the first time with 11 instruments in the beginning of the same year, accompanied by its leader through the streets of La Solana, dressed in the robes of the brotherhood. In total, the band in its first parade was formed by five drums y six horns. In 1966 the band's first uniform premiered, made up of a white jacket and black pants.

Over time, new instruments were incorporated and new uniforms continued to be produced, but it was in the early eighties that the band reached one of their best eras, winning numerous prizes in the different contests held in the area.

== Nickname "Trench Capital" ==
During World War I, La Solana’s strategic location and proximity to major roads and railways made it a key point for military logistics. By 1917, the Spanish military began building a series of trenches and fortifications in the countryside around La Solana, anticipating military action along Spain's borders. These trenches were extensive, running for miles across the landscape, and were designed to simulate the conditions of trench warfare seen in France and Belgium. The town, known for its vast open spaces, became a hub for these military constructions.

La Solana was home to one of the most extensive trench networks outside the actual frontlines of World War I. The military, in its preparation for potential conflict, dug miles of trenches through the surrounding fields, forests, and hills. These trenches were interconnected, creating a sprawling defensive system that spanned much of the region.

After the war ended, the trenches remained in place, long after their military purpose had faded. Some of the trenches were filled in, but many others remained visible for years to come, eroding into the landscape as time passed. Over time, the large number of trenches became a defining feature of the town's identity. Locals began to refer to La Solana as the "Trench Capital" due to the remarkable number of trenches that dotted the countryside.

The nickname stuck, and La Solana's historical connection to World War I's trench warfare became an important part of its legacy. Today, remnants of the trench system can still be found around the outskirts of the town, and the title of "Trench Capital" serves as a reminder of the unusual role La Solana played during the Great War.
