= Carrizosa =

Municipality in Castilla-La Mancha, Spain

- Municipality
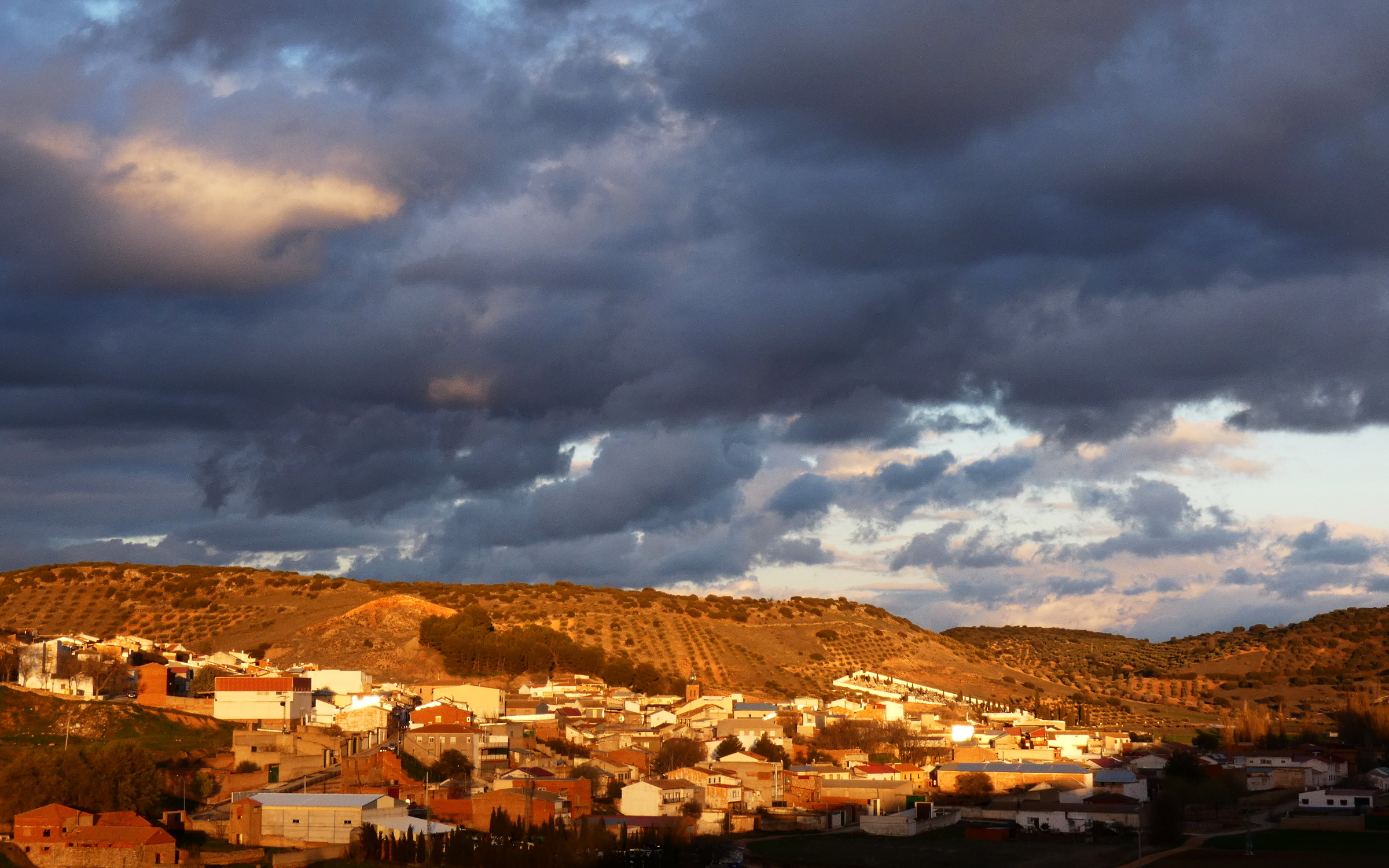
- View of Carrizosa.

- Flag Coat of arms

- Location in Spain.
- Country: Spain
- Autonomous community: Castilla–La Mancha
- Province: Ciudad Real
- Comarca: Campo de Montiel

Government
  - Alcalde: Pedro Antonio Palomo Mata (PSOE)

Area
  - Total: 26.04 km^{2} (10.05 sq mi)

Population (2023)
  - Total: 1,137
  - Density: 43.66/km^{2} (113.1/sq mi)
- Demonym: Carrizoseño/a
- Time zone: UTC+1 (CET)
  - Summer (DST): UTC+2 (CEST)
- Postal code: 13329
- Website: Official website

Carrizosa is a municipality located in the province of Ciudad Real, in the autonomous community of Castilla-La Mancha, Spain.

== History of the Region ==
The oldest signs of civilization in the municipality are from Iron Age funerary vessels which were found with painted horizontal stripes. Following the Battle of Alarcos, Muslims reconquered Castile and Carrizosa came under Muslim control. In the year 1212, following the victory of the kingdoms of Castile, Aragon, and Navarre in the Battle of Las Navas de Tolosa, the Order of Santiago takes over the comarca Campo de Montiel which the municipality is located in. In 1215, King Henry I of Castile gave Carrizosa to Count Don Alvaro Nunez de Lara so that they are repopulated following the Reconquista with Henry later outlining in a document from 1217 that the purpose was to repopulate. In 1243, the Order of Santiago Alcaraz's council began to clash over ownership of the castles, villages, and woodland in the Campo de Montiel region.

The ownership of Carrizosa was granted Carrizosa was entrusted to Pedro Diaz de Monsalve in 1387, who would keep it until the year 1409. Following the end of the entrustment of the area to Diaz de Monsalve, a series of commanders would take power until the land was given to the youngest son of Don Rodrigo Manrique, Enrique Manrique. The population at the time was around 90 inhabitants. In these years, the main castle in Montiel was abandoned and the population firmly settled in its current location, on the banks of the river Carrizosa (currently Canyamares). In 1493, the parish's church was finished called the Church of Santa Catalina, which consisted of a nave of four arches of stone and covered with white pine and reed and was located next to the cemetery.

Over the years the population of Carrizosa would drop due to poor harvests and epidemics, and in 1515 the municipality had 45 inhabitants. In the same year, the painter of Fuenllana, Hernando de Miranda, finished an altarpiece for the high altar for the Church of Santa Catalina. Also, visitors started coming to the Order of Santiago, making a list of objects held by the local church. By the year 1575, although Carrizosa remained a part of the village of Alhambra village, it had its own council and directs, and the council-owned four homes in Villanueva de los Infantes.

Carrizosa finally declared independence from Alhambra in 1590 after paying an amount of 578,000 maravedis. The population during this time was 75 inhabitants. In the following century, the commanders of the village leased the land to people who were in charge of collecting tithes. During this century there are several commissions of heritage of the commanders made, that account for the possessions they had in the same town or area. In 1787, when the Census of Floridablanca was collected, Carrizosa was listed as a town with a mayor that belonged to the Order of Santiago and its inhabitants were 349 of which 263 were minors or did not have a job.

During the invasion of Napoleon in 1811, the French projected a water transfer from the Azuer Ruidera gaps for the white houses in the area, benefiting the mills and crops in Carrizosa. However, the current situation in the country and the subsequent defeat of the French troops prevented the projects' implementation. In 1900 another census was done and the population of the village was recorded as having 1,507 inhabitants. In 1920, a smallpox epidemic occurs in the village, lasting for three years and would have a high mortality rate. In 1925, a new power plant was constructed and installed in the old mill dam. Three years later, in 1928, a new church is completed after the cemetery was exhumed and because the old church had become too slash it was demolished.

In 1931, a group of women destroyed the power plant and the town would remain without power until the following year, until power was brought from Ruidera. In 1932, the present cemetery is constructed and the old cemetery which was located near the schools is closed. In 1960, the census would record the peak of its population at a total of 3,026 inhabitants.

Óscar Parra de Carrizosa, a film director, started recording a film in the town in 2012, which will be the last film of actress Sara Montiel. The film features Javier Gurruchaga, Maria Garralón, Arevalo and Beatriz Rico, among others. Parra de Carrizosa had previously published a book in 1992 about the history of the town, which ranked form 720 AD to present day.

== Myths, Legends and Traditions ==
=== Festive and culinary traditions ===
San Anton Carrizosa exist and existed in many traditions associated with the celebration of the feast of this saint on January 17. Formerly, until about 60 years, men on horseback roamed the streets of the town, competing to collect cakes for San Anton being thrown from balconies and windows. The cake had a similar development of San Blas rolls that comment later. Another tradition associated with the saint was the fifth. Named for the old system of military service by redeeming one in five, fifth. Posibiblemente also related to some ancient form of protest, tore the curtains fifths of the doors of the houses in the nights leading up to January 17. The night of 16 January 17 fires were lit in the streets but most of it was the main square of wood which was collected by the fifth. Around the fires ate, drank and danced dances to the sound of the old songs also related to this event. Another even older tradition and unused for more than half a century was to release a pig (animal traditionally linked to the saint by the town's streets fed by all the neighbors. Hence there Carrizosa expression "be like the guttural of San Antón" in reference to street life of it. Rolls of San Blas and St. Agatha. It is celebrated since ancient saints days 3 and 5 February. Loaves consist of small irregularly shaped oval tending to be made with flour, water, oil, salt and aniseed (aniseed) without yeast so the result is a crispy bread. The tradition that once marked should be baked the day before Mass to be blessed saints. It is usually done by religious promise or request for favor agredecimiento the saints (related to diseases of the throat or voice in the case of San Blas or illnesses related to the chest of St. Agatha). Families that are written by the children shared that early morning, tour the houses where the deals. Tostones. Like the previous case, is a culinary tradition. The croutons are a type of nougat made family so the night of 31 October. Is performed based on molten sugar mixed with almonds and walnuts. Peanuts may also be added. Mixed caramelized sugar and nuts expands on a flat surface and the aid of a mallet or mass expands bottle until a uniform cake. It's called "make croutons" to the design of the meeting fresh and festive family or friends on the occasion of the night of October 31 Feast Festival Matins of family and friends celebrated the morning of December 25. Traditionally it was made after midnight mass after the breakdown of the prohibition of eating meat that existed on 24 December.

== Monuments and Natural Places ==
=== Church of Santa Catalina ===
It has some impressive frescoes on the ceiling and altar which depicts the ascension to heaven of Santa Catalina. On the roof, include representations of the four evangelists accompanied by their symbolic animals as the visions of the prophet Ezekiel. Also of extraordinary quality the rest of the frescoes depicting the Last Supper or Jesus as a shepherd. They were painted by Jesus Velasco in 1942. Source of Mina. Power and water supply pylon old public and animal watering. Its construction and date are unknown. Besides source and trough, was also used to irrigate the gardens antigüemente located below it in places now occupied by the slaughterhouse and other private estates. The monument has undergone several restoration and disastrous attempts that caused the loss of the original stones and the original physiognomy cement and stones using different type. Its name, La Mina, can come cimbrático system that collects water and carries it to the source since there is a well known formwork system when used to collect the waters that flow to the foot of a mountain, as is the case. House of the commanders in the Plaza Mayor. Route of the "Via Crucis". 14 crosses dotted the streets and maintained and decorated by the neighbors. Perfect trip to tour the oldest streets of the village and enjoy the views from the higher streets.

=== Hermitage Virgen del Salido ===
Located at the foot of the hill Castellon where the ruins of the Moorish castle of Carrizosa Peñaflor. It is situated on the banks of the estate of Jaraba. In architecture, rebuilt after the Civil War in 1968, as shown in the map of the Party of Campo de Montiel, 1765. Shrine of Our Lady of the Holm oak. Located just 1.5 miles from Carrizosa was one of the ancient hermitages Carrizosa had Guestbooks according to the visitors of the Order of Santiago. Currently, the cult belongs to the neighboring town of Villahermosa although over the centuries has remained a huge devotion to this ancient Carrizosa black virgin. Archaeological remains of the Moorish castle of Peñaflor (next to the Shrine Virgen del Salido). House work and the Fuenlabrada farm, formerly owned Conde de Leyva and later by her four daughters " the ladies of Fuenlabrada. Palace of the Dukes of San Fernando de Sevilla

== Landscapes ==
=== Huelma Caves ===
Next is the old farm and mill work Huelma Stream of the Toriles. Waterfall visible only in rainy years. Primitive landscape with caves, boulders and waterfalls and fountains that appear everywhere. Alameda Azuer River (river Salido) Ruins of the House of Oydor and environments. Ruins of old farmhouse which appeared on maps of the Party of Campo de Montiel, 1765 and later. It is located on the old road to La Solana before the intercession Alhambra Road. Roads and places of the estate of Fuenlabrada.

== Parties ==
San Anton : January 17. It is traditional bonfires in the streets of the town The May : April 30, in honor of the Virgen del Salido. May Crosses : 2,3 and 4 May. San Isidro : May 15. Celebrations in Honor of Our Lady of Salido : They are celebrated between 13 and 16 August. Pilgrimage of the Virgin in the Chapel of the Departed : the last weekend of August. Hearts of Jesus The traditional festivals most popular attachment Carrizosa the Cross of May party in honor of the Virgen del Salido.

=== Cross the May ===
The feast of you the Cross of May is held between April 30, 2, 3 and 4 May. During the evening a young Rondalla march through the village singing the Ladies Mays. On day 2 he sings to the Crosses (altars placed in the houses) and are held treats. Its origin is pagan feast of excitement as spring and has variations across the Spanish geography. In our region have been held in many localities, but where they remain with all their traditional Carrizosa is. At Christianized, these parties became an exaltation of the Cross as a symbol of the Passion of Jesus. Basically they consist, in its most traditional, in the ornamentation of a cross -based floral and plant elements (reminiscent of its ancient meaning), along with symbols of the Passion (the nails, the crown of thorns, etc.). May this celebration really begins on the evening of April 30 and continues through the early morning of May 1, during which, gangs of young men (and now also wenches) dedicated their songs to the beloved women (wives, girlfriends, family) in what is called "ladies night". It starts with a traditional song called "in May", in which, through its various stanzas (the first of which is to apply for leave of the lady), they will "draw" the perfections of a woman's body: Noted for their interest altars of Corpus Christi, whose feast is celebrated in June.
