= Santo Domingo de Guzmán, Terrinches =

Roman Catholic Parish

Santo Domingo de Guzmán is a Roman Catholic parish church located in the town of Terrinches in the province of Ciudad Real in the autonomous community of Castile-La Mancha, Spain.

The church was initiated during 1468 to 1493, and completed between 1494 and 1515. The church has temple-fortress layout with a single nave. It has a bell-tower with a square base and octagonal top. The sides has buttresses. The main portal has an Isabelline Gothic decoration with arched top. It had some refurbishments over the years, but the interior was not completed until the 17th century, when the main retablo was added. The organ was built by García Herráiz. Its pipes disappeared during the Spanish civil war, and were rebuilt only in 2006–2009.
