= Francisco de Quevedo =

Spanish nobleman, writer and politician (1580–1645)

Francisco de Quevedo Knight of the Order of Santiago
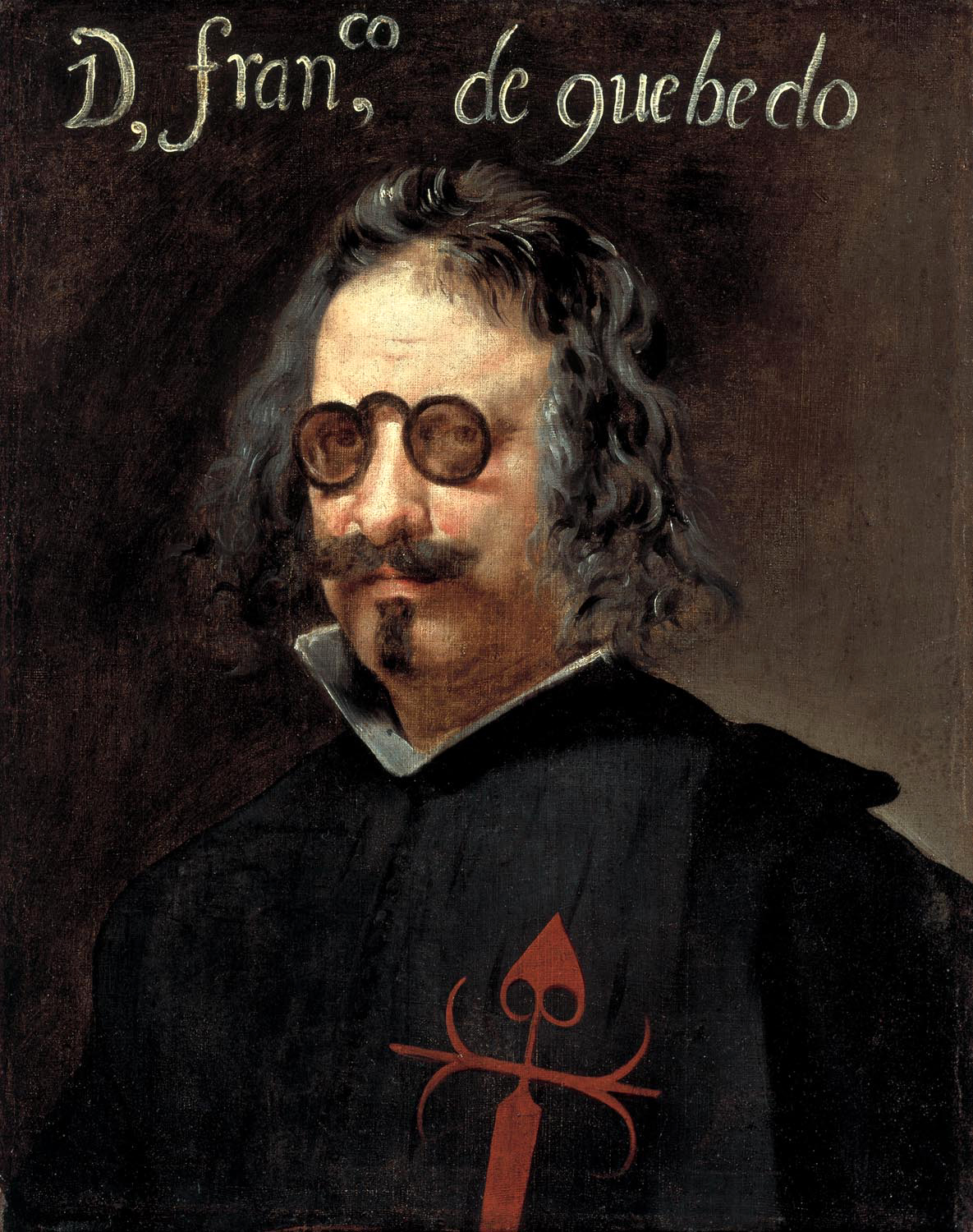
- Francisco de Quevedo, Juan van der Hamen, 17th century (Instituto Valencia de Don Juan)
- Born: Francisco Gómez de Quevedo y Santibáñez Villegas; 14 September 1580; Madrid, Spain
- Died: 8 September 1645 (aged 64); Villanueva de los Infantes, Spain
- Education: Universidad de Alcalá
- Occupations: Poet and politician
- Writing career
- Language: Spanish
- Period: Spanish Golden Age
- Genres: Poetry and novel
- Movement: Conceptismo

Francisco Gómez de Quevedo y Santibáñez Villegas, Knight of the Order of Santiago (Spanish pronunciation: [fɾanˈθisko ðe keˈβeðo]; 14 September 1580 – 8 September 1645), was a Spanish nobleman, politician and writer of the Baroque era. Along with his lifelong rival Luis de Góngora, Quevedo was one of the most prominent Spanish poets of the age. His style is characterized by what was called conceptismo. This style existed in stark contrast to Góngora's culteranismo.

== Biography ==
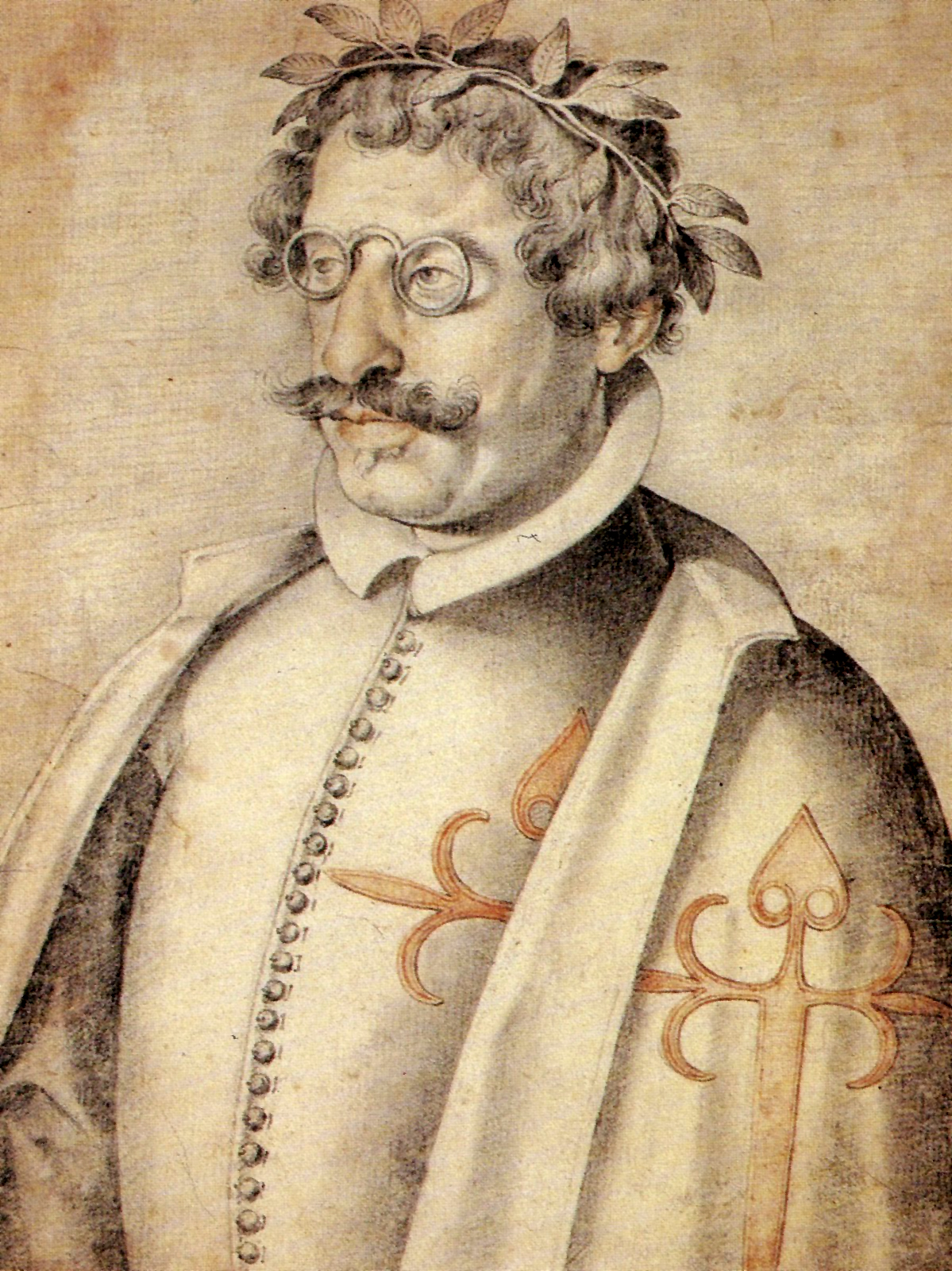
Portrait of Quevedo (c. 1618) by Francisco Pacheco.

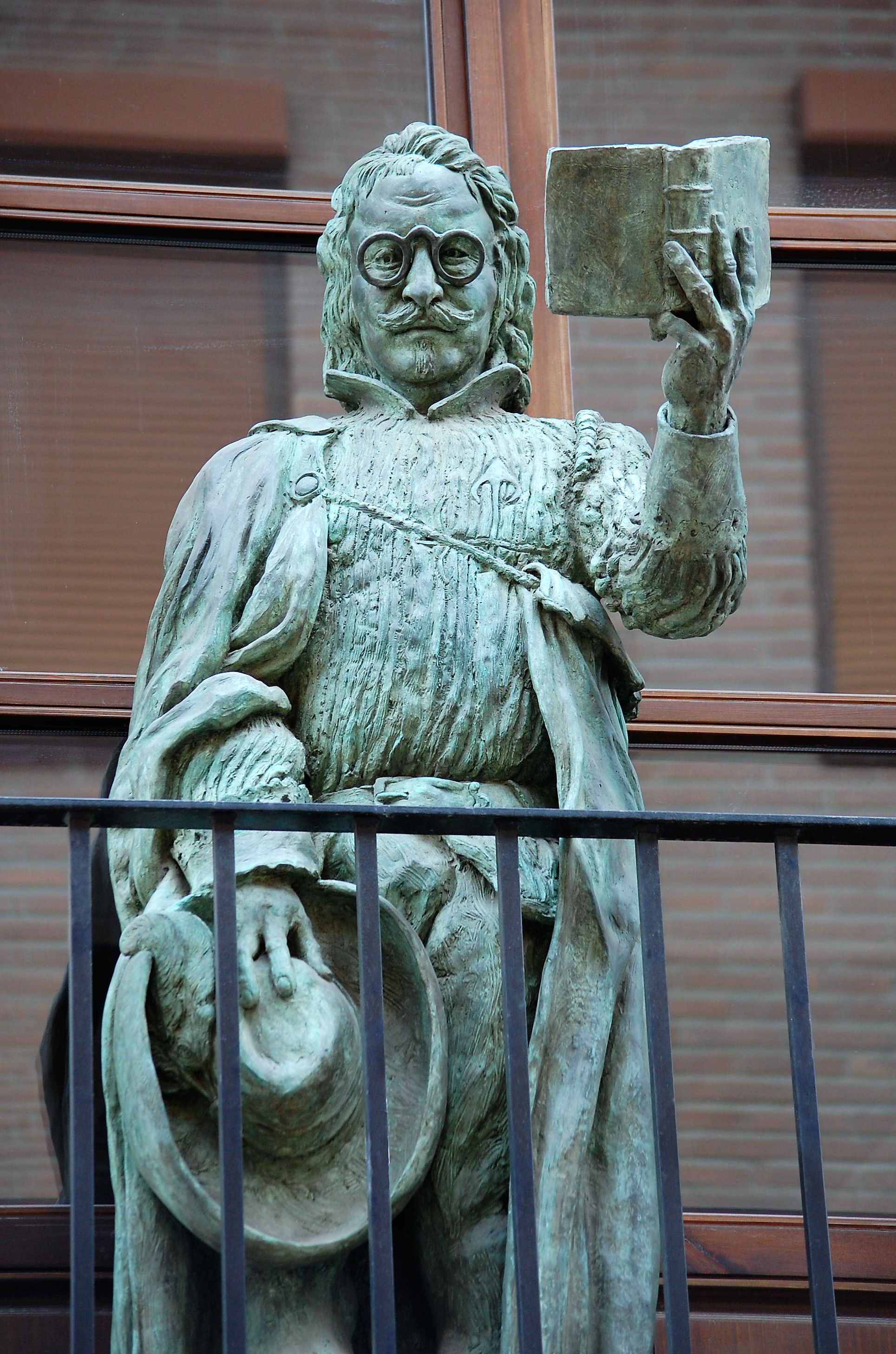
Statue of Francisco de Quevedo in Alcalá de Henares.

Quevedo was born on 14 September 1580 in Madrid into a family of hidalgos from the village of Vejorís, located in the northern mountainous region of Cantabria. His family was descended from the Castilian nobility.

Quevedo's father, Francisco Gómez de Quevedo, was secretary to Maria of Spain, daughter of emperor Charles V and wife of Maximilian II, Holy Roman Emperor, and his mother, Madrid-born María de Santibáñez, was lady-in-waiting to the queen. Quevedo matured surrounded by dignitaries and nobility at the royal court. Intellectually gifted, Quevedo was physically handicapped with a club foot, and myopia. Since he always wore pince-nez, his name in the plural, quevedos, came to mean "pince-nez" in the Spanish language.

Orphaned by the age of six, he was able to attend the Imperial School run by the Jesuits in Madrid. He then attended university at Alcalá de Henares from 1596 to 1600. By his own account, he made independent studies in philosophy, classical languages, Arabic, Hebrew, French and Italian.

In 1601, Quevedo, as a member of the Court, moved to Valladolid, where the Court had been transferred by the King's minister, the Duke of Lerma. There he studied theology, a subject that would become a lifelong interest, and on which in later life he would compose the treatise Providencia de Dios (God's Providence) against atheism.

By this time, he was becoming noted as both a poet and a prose writer. Some of his poetry was collected in a 1605 generational anthology by Pedro Espinosa entitled Flores de Poetas Ilustres (Flowers by Illustrious Poets).

We can also date back to this time the first draft of his picaresque novel Vida del Buscón – apparently written as an exercise in courtly wit – and a few satirical pamphlets that made him famous among his fellow students and which he would later disown as juvenile pranks.

Around this time, he began a very erudite exchange of letters with the humanist Justus Lipsius, in which Quevedo deplored the wars that were ravaging Europe. The Court returned to Madrid in 1606, and Quevedo followed, remaining till 1611. By then, he was a well-known and accomplished man-of-letters. He befriended and was praised by Miguel de Cervantes and Lope de Vega, the premier playwright of the age.

Between 1616–1622, Quevedo attended the Medrano Academy (Poetic Academy of Madrid) founded by Dr. Sebastián Francisco de Medrano.

=== Enemies ===
Quevedo's enemies included, among others, the dramatist Juan Ruiz de Alarcón for, despite his own physical handicaps, Quevedo found Alarcón's redheaded and hunchbacked physique a source of amusement. Quevedo also attacked Juan Pérez de Montalbán, the son of a bookseller with whom he had quarrelled, satirizing him in La Perinola (The Teetotum), a piece against Montalbán's book Para todos (For Everyone). In 1608, being a skilled swordsman himself aside from a writer (las armas y las letras), Quevedo supposedly duelled with the author and fencing master Luis Pacheco de Narváez as a result of Quevedo criticizing one of Pacheco's works. Quevedo took off Pacheco's hat in the first encounter. They remained enemies all their lives. In Quevedo's Buscón, this duel was parodied with a fencer relying on mathematical calculations having to run away from a duel with an experienced soldier.

Quevedo could be impulsive. He was present at the church of San Martín in Madrid when a woman praying there was slapped on the cheek by another man who had rushed up to her. Quevedo seized the man, dragging him outside the church. The two men drew swords, and Quevedo ran his opponent through. The man, who died of his wounds some time later, was someone of importance. Quevedo thus retired temporarily to the palace of his friend and patron, Pedro Téllez-Girón, 3rd Duke of Osuna.

The preferred object of his fury and ridicule, however, was the poet Góngora, whom, in a series of scathing satires, he accused of being an unworthy priest, a homosexual, a gambler, and a writer of indecent verse who used a purposefully obscure language. Quevedo lampooned his rival by writing a sonnet, Aguja de navegar cultos, which listed words from Góngora's lexicon: "He who would like to be a culto poet in just one day, / must the following jargon learn: / Fulgores, arrogar, joven, presiente / candor, construye, métrica, armonía..."

Quevedo satirized Góngora's physique, particularly his prominent nose in the sonnet A una nariz, (To a Nose). It begins with the lines: Érase un hombre a una nariz pegado, / érase una nariz superlativa, / érase una nariz sayón y escriba, / érase un peje espada muy barbado. (There was a man glued to a nose, / there was a superlative nose, / there was a nose that was an official and a scribe, / there was a bearded swordfish.)

=== Relationships with the Duke of Osuna ===
About that time, Quevedo grew very close to Pedro Téllez-Girón, 3rd Duke of Osuna, one of the great statesmen and generals of the age, whom he accompanied as secretary to Italy in 1613, carrying out a number of missions for him which took him to Nice, Venice, and finally back to Madrid. There he engaged in all manner of courtly intrigue to get the viceroyalty of Kingdom of Naples for Osuna, an effort that finally bore fruit in 1616. He then returned to Italy in the Duke's entourage, where he was entrusted with putting in order the Viceroyalty's finances, and sent on several espionage-related missions to the rival Republic of Venice, although it is now believed these did not involve him personally. He was rewarded for his efforts with a knighthood in the order of Santiago in 1618.

=== Temporary exile and retirement ===
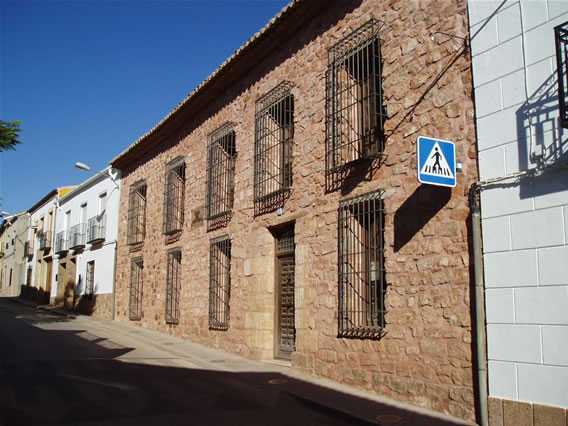
Casa Quevedo in Torre de Juan Abad.

With the fall from favor of Osuna in 1620, Quevedo lost his patron and protector and was exiled to Torre de Juan Abad (Ciudad Real), whose fiefdom his mother had purchased for him. His supposed vassals, however, refused to acknowledge him, forcing Quevedo into an interminable legal battle with the town's council that would not be won until after his death.

Quevedo would write some of his better poetry in this retirement, such as the sonnet Retirado a la paz de estos desiertos... or Son las torres de Joray.... He found consolation to his failed ambitions as a courtier in the Stoicism of Seneca, his study and commentary turning him into one of the main exponents of Spanish Neostoicism.

The elevation of Philip IV to the throne in 1621 meant the end of Quevedo's exile, and his return to Court and politics, now under the influence of the new minister, the Count-Duke of Olivares. Quevedo accompanied the young king in trips to Andalusia and Aragon, recounting some of its various incidents in interesting letters.

At this time he decided to denounce to the Spanish Inquisition his own works, published without his consent by profiteering booksellers. It was a move to frighten off the booksellers and regain control over his writings, with a view to a definitive edition of his work that was not to come in his lifetime.

He became known for a disorderly lifestyle: he was a heavy smoker, a frequent visitor to brothels and taverns, and cohabited with a woman only known as Ledesma. Góngora derided him as a drunkard in a satirical poem as Don Francisco de Quebebo (a play on his name that can be roughly translated as Don Francisco of Drinksalot.)

None of this put a stop to his career at court, perhaps because the king had an equally rowdy reputation. In fact, in 1632 he would become secretary to the king, thus reaching the apex of his political career.

His friend Antonio Juan de la Cerda, the Duke de Medinaceli, forced Quevedo to marry against his will with Doña Esperanza de Aragón, a widow with children. The marriage, made in 1634, barely lasted three months. Quevedo filled these years with febrile creative activity.

In 1634 he published La cuna y la sepultura (The Cradle and the Sepulchre) and the translation of La introducción a la vida devota (Introduction to a Life of Devotion) of Francis of Sales; between 1633 and 1635 he completed works like De los remedios de cualquier fortuna (On the Remedies of Any Fortune), the Epicteto, Virtud Militante, Los cuatro fantasmas (The Four Ghosts), the second part of Política de Dios (The Politics of God), Visita y anatomía de la cabeza del cardenal Richelieu (Visit and Anatomy of the Head of Cardinal Richelieu) or Carta a Luis XIII (Letter to Louis XIII).

In 1635 there appeared in Valencia the most important of the numerous libels destined to defame him, El tribunal de la justa venganza, erigido contra los escritos de Francisco de Quevedo, maestro de errores, doctor en desvergüenzas, licenciado en bufonerías, bachiller en suciedades, catedrático de vicios y protodiablo entre los hombres. (The Court of the rightful revenge, erected against the writings of Francisco de Quevedo, teacher of errors, doctor in shamelessness, licensed in buffoonery, bachelor in dirt, university professor of vices and proto-devil among men.)

=== Arrest and exile ===
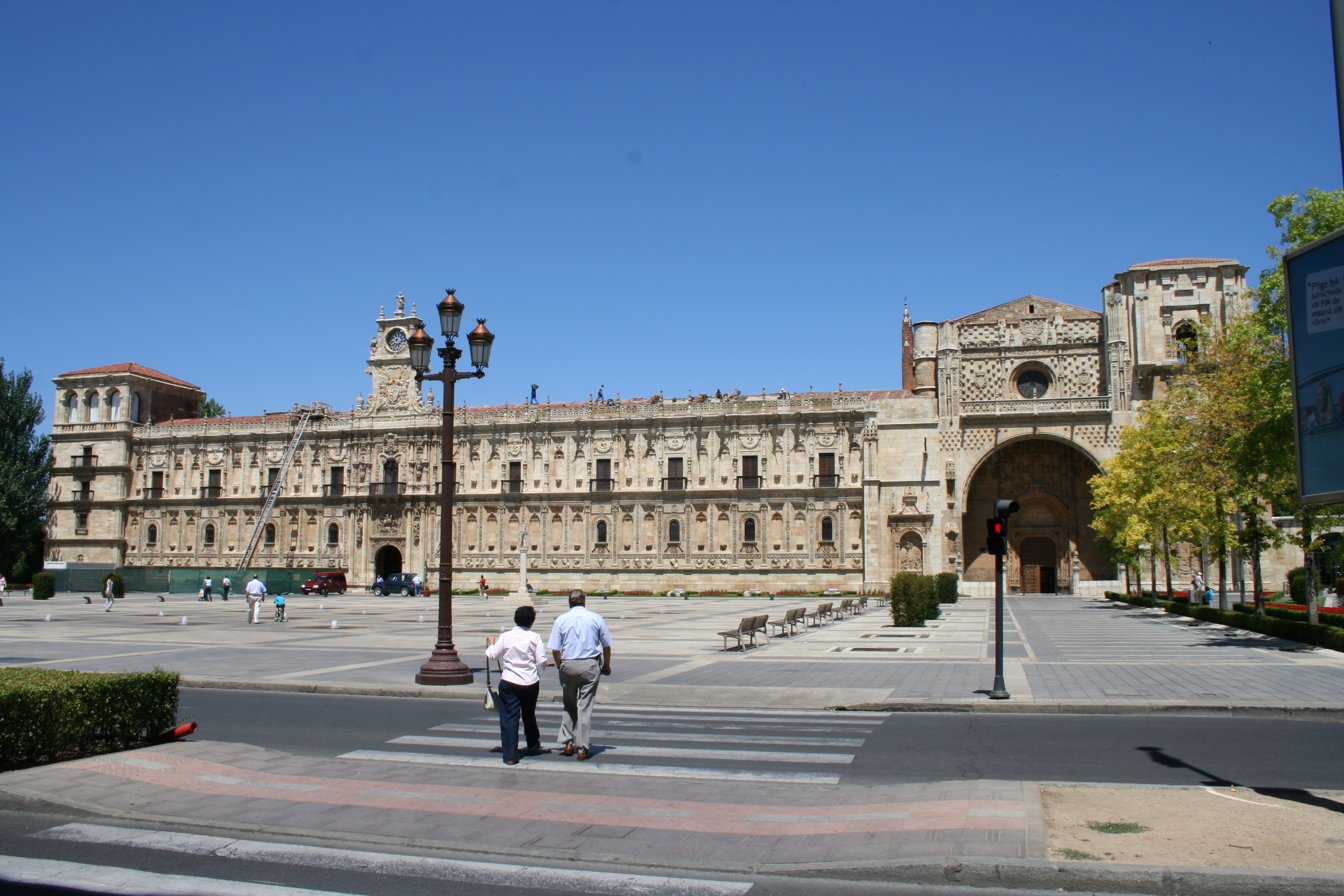
Convent of San Marcos in León.

In 1639, he was arrested. His books were confiscated. The authorities, hardly giving Quevedo time to get dressed, took the poet to the convent of San Marcos in León. In the monastery Quevedo dedicated himself to reading, as recounted in his Carta moral e instructiva (Moral and instructive letter), written to his friend, Adán de la Parra, depicting hour by hour his prison life ("From ten to eleven, I spend my time in prayer and devotions, and from eleven to noon I read good and bad authors; because there is no book, despicable as it can be, that does not contain something good...").

Quevedo, who was frail and very ill when he left from his confinement in 1643, resigned from royal court definitively to retire at Torre de Juan Abad. He died in the Dominican convent of Villanueva de los Infantes, on 8 September 1645. One tale tells that his tomb was pillaged days later by a gentleman who wished to have the gold spurs with which Quevedo had been buried.

== Style ==
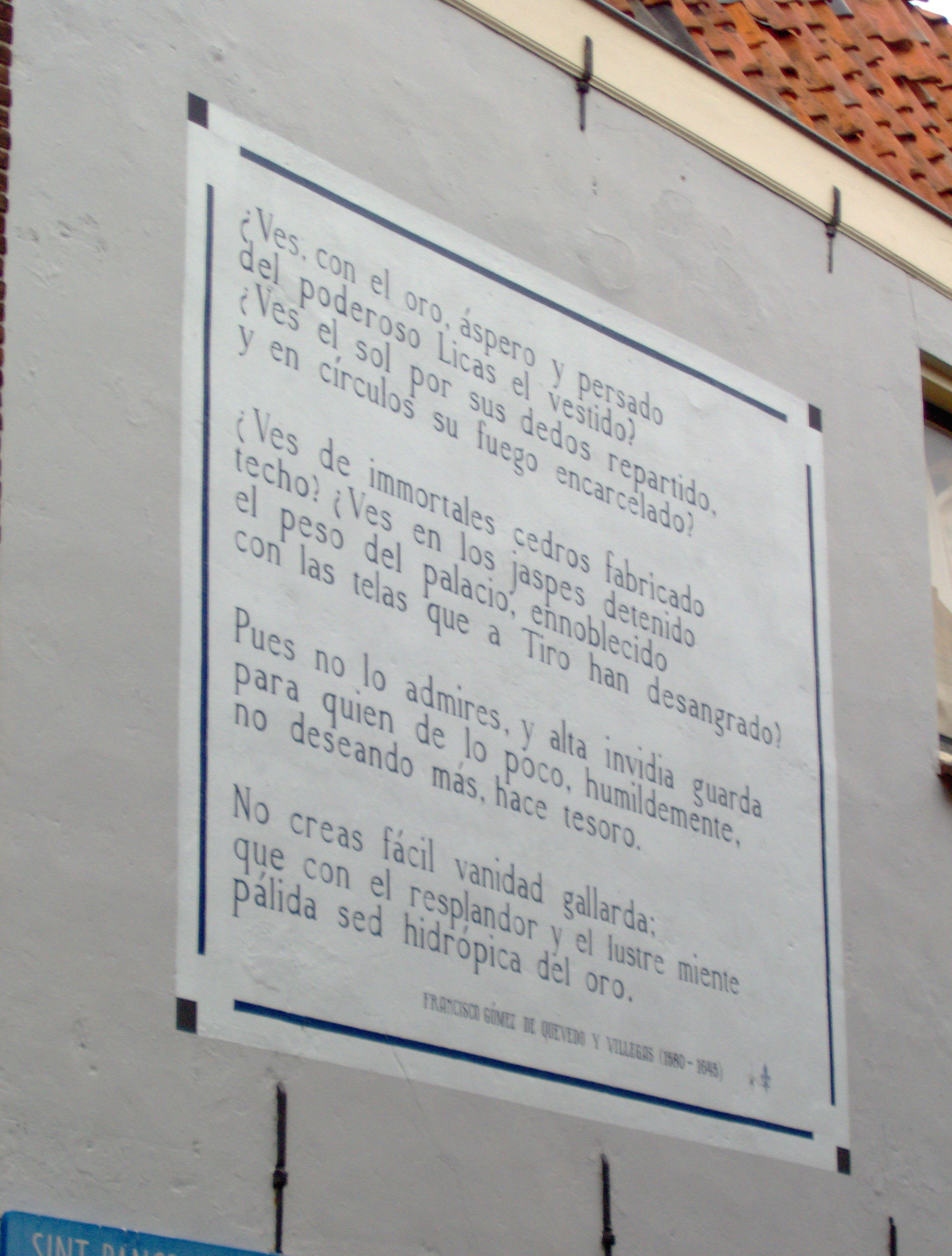
Wall poem in Leiden

Quevedo was an adherent of the style known as conceptismo, a name derived from concepto, which has been defined as "a brilliant flash of wit expressed in pithy or epigrammatic style." Conceptismo is characterized by a rapid rhythm, directness, simple vocabulary, witty metaphors, and wordplay. In this style, multiple meanings are conveyed in a very concise manner, and conceptual intricacies are emphasised over elaborate vocabulary. Conceptismo can effect elegant philosophical depth, as well as biting satire and humor, such as in the case of the works of Quevedo and Baltasar Gracián.

The first tercet from Quevedo's sonnet ¡Ah de la vida! is considered to exemplify conceptismo in poetry at its peak:

Ayer se fue, mañana no ha llegado,
Hoy se está yendo sin parar un punto;
Soy un fue, y un será y un es cansado.

== Works ==
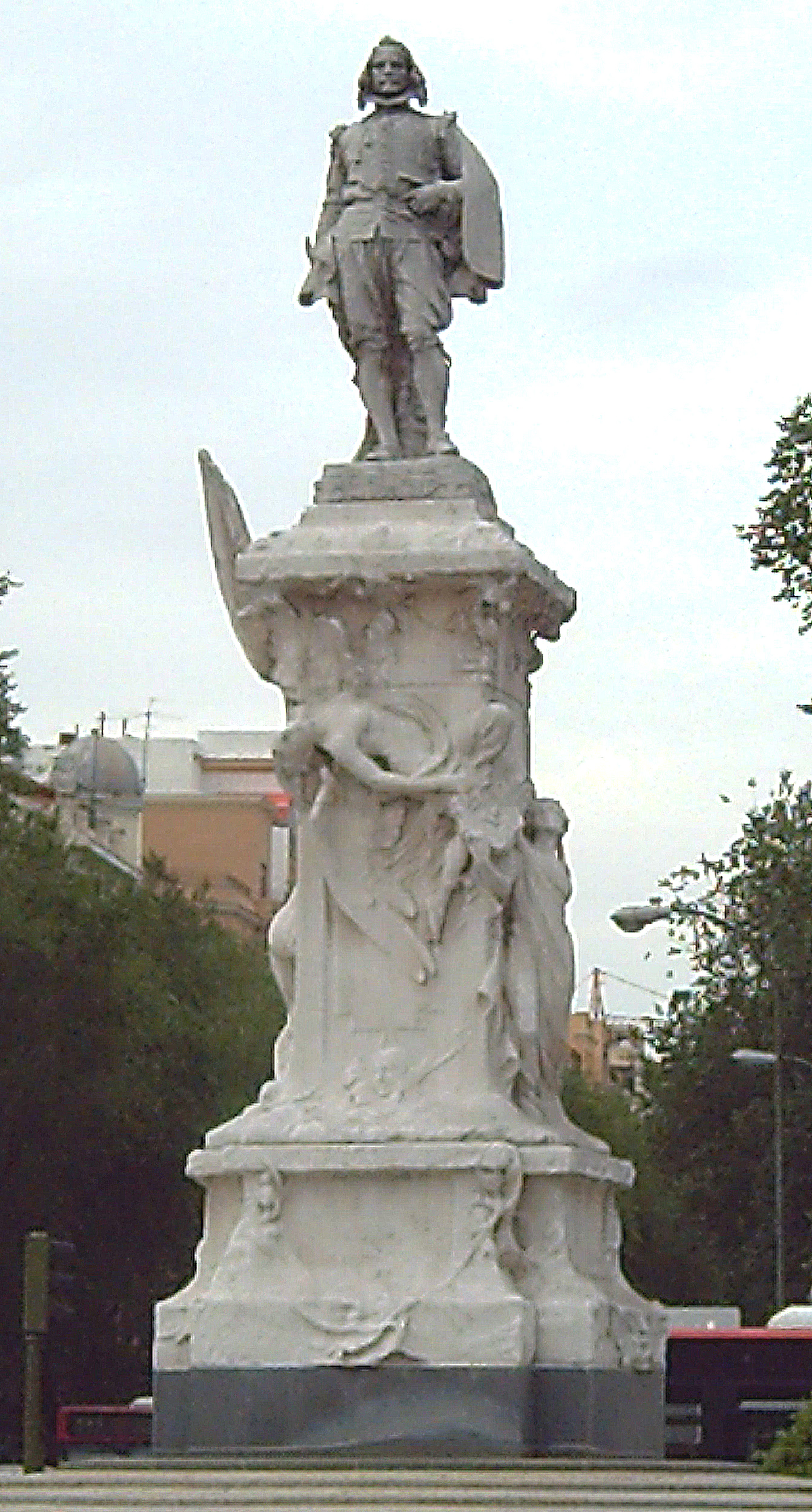
Monument to Quevedo in Madrid, by Agustí Querol Subirats.

=== Poetry ===
Quevedo produced a vast quantity of poetry. His poetry, which was not published in book form during his lifetime, "shows the caricature-like vision its author had of men, a vision sometimes deformed by a sharp, cruel, violently critical nature." This attitude is of a piece with the "black seventeenth century" he lived in. Despite his satirical work, however, Quevedo was primarily a serious poet who valued love poems.

His poetry gives evidence not only of his literary gifts but also of his erudition (Quevedo had studied Greek, Latin, Hebrew, Arabic, French, and Italian). One of his sonnets, A Roma sepultada en sus ruinas (1650), was an adaptation of a French poem by Joachim du Bellay, Nouveau venu qui cherches Rome en Rome, from Les Antiquités de Rome (1558). His poetic works range from satirical and mythological subjects to love poetry and philosophical pieces.

Quevedo constantly attacked avarice and avaricious people. His Cartas del Caballero de la Tenaza attack a notorious miser. He also attacked apothecaries, who had a reputation for adulterating and badly preparing medications.

His love poetry includes such works as Afectos varios de su corazón, fluctuando en las ondas de los cabellos de Lisi (Several Reactions of his Heart, Bobbing on the Waves of Lisi's Hair). As one scholar has written, "Even though women were never very much appreciated by Quevedo, who is labeled as a misogynist, it is impossible to imagine that there was anyone else who could adore them more." The first four lines run as follows:

Within a curly storm of wavy gold
must swim great gulfs of pure and blazing light
my heart, for beauty eagerly athirst,
when your abundant tresses you unbind.

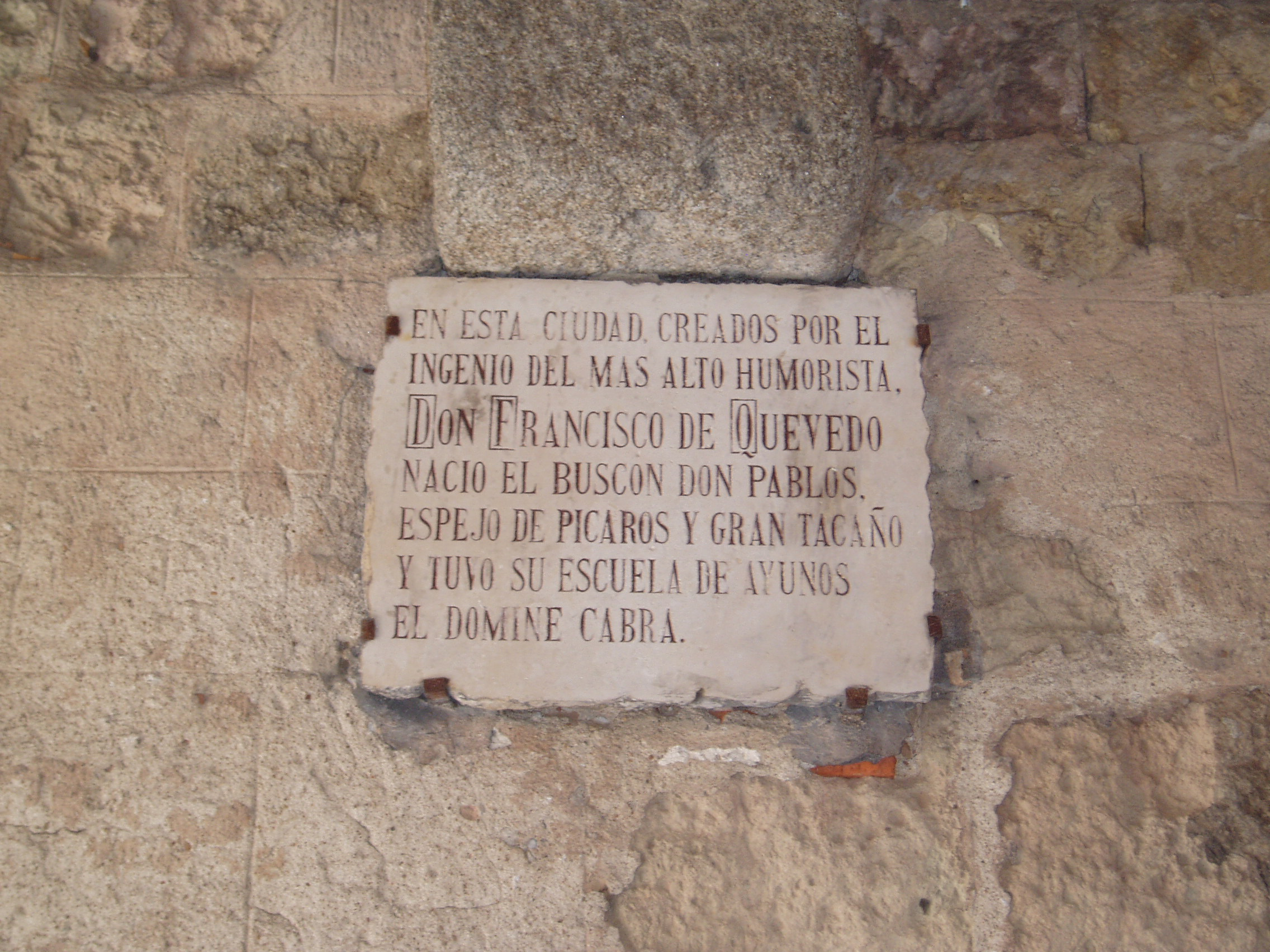
Plaque dedicated to El Buscón in Segovia.

His work also employed mythological themes, typical of the age, though it also employs satirical elements, for example in his To Apollo chasing Daphne:

Ruddy silversmith from up on high,
in whose bright beams the rabble pick their fleas:
Daphne, that nymph, who takes off and won't speak,
if you'd possess her, pay, and douse your light.

Quevedo's poetry also includes pieces such as an imagined dedication to Columbus by a piece of the ship in which the navigator had discovered the New World:

Once I had an empire, wanderer,
upon the billows of the salty sea;
I was moved by the wind and well-respected,
to southern lands I forged an opening.

=== Novel ===
The only novel written by Quevedo is the picaresque novel Vida del Buscón, or El Buscón (full original title: Historia de la vida del Buscón, llamado Don Pablos, ejemplo de vagamundos y espejo de tacaños), published in 1626. The work is divided into three books. The novel was popular in English; it was first translated by John Davies in 1657 under the title The Life and Adventures of Buscon the Witty Spaniard, a second edition appearing in 1670. New translations appeared in 1683 and 1707.

=== Theological works ===
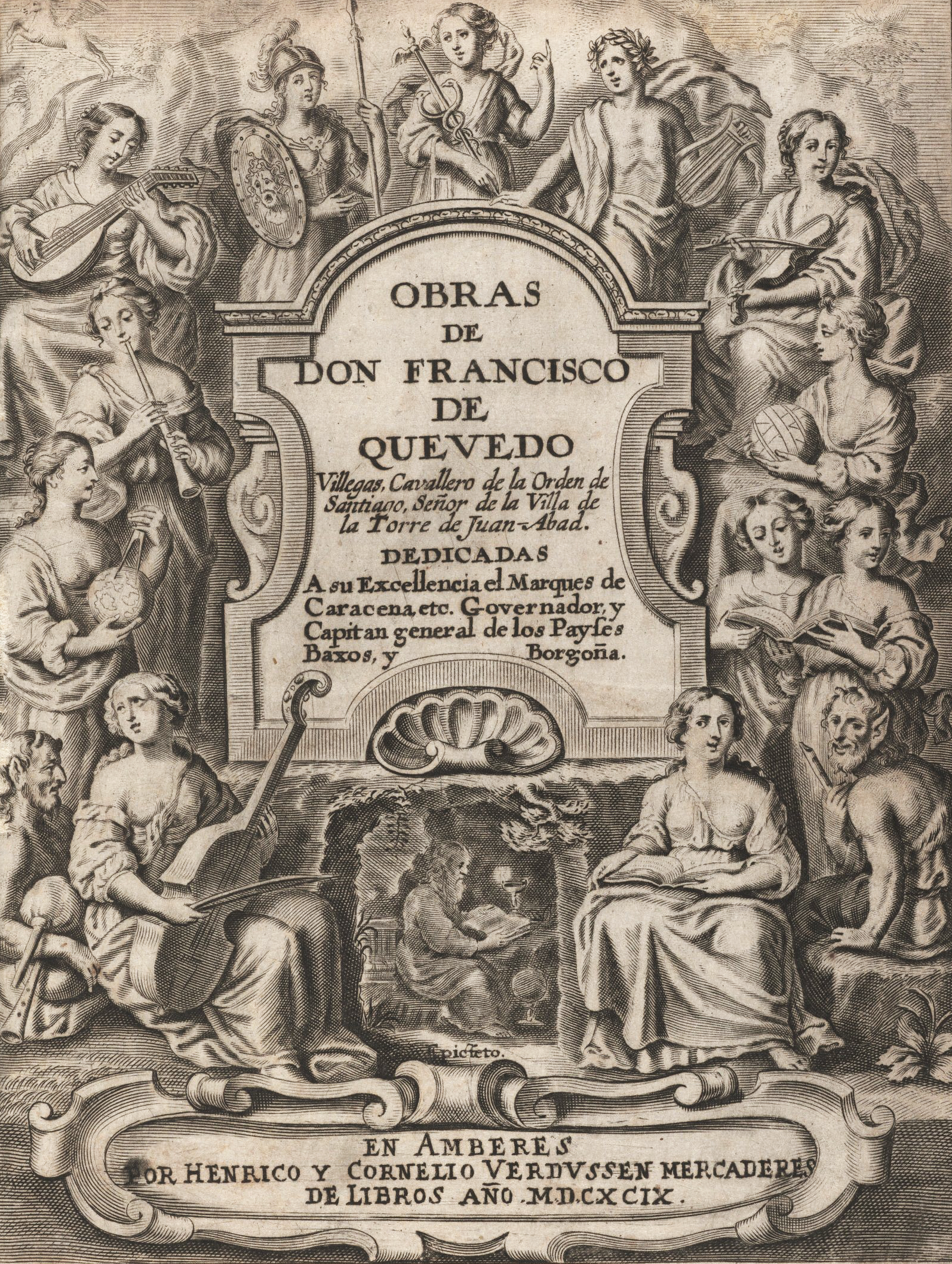
Obras de don Francisco de Quevedo Villegas, 1699

Quevedo produced about 15 books on theological and ascetic subjects. These include La cuna y la sepultura (1612; The Cradle and the Grave) and La providencia de Dios (1641; The Providence of God).

=== Literary criticism ===
His works on literary criticism include La culta latiniparla (The Craze for Speaking Latin) and Aguja de navegar cultos (Compass for Navigating among Euphuistic Reefs). Both works were written with the purpose of attacking culteranismo.

=== Satire ===
Quevedo's satire includes Sueños y discursos, also known as Los Sueños (1627; Dreams and Discourses). Quevedo employed much word-play in this work, which consists of five "dream-visions." The first is The Dream of the Last Judgment, in which Quevedo finds himself witnessing the Day of Judgment, and closes with a glimpse of Hell itself. The second dream is The Bedeviled Constable in which a constable is possessed by an evil spirit, which results in the evil spirit begging to be exorcised, since the constable is more evil of the two. The third dream is the long Vision of Hell. The fourth dream-vision is called The World from the Inside. The last dream is Dream of Death, in which Quevedo offers examples of man's dishonest ways.

In the Dreams, the somewhat misanthropic Quevedo showcased his antipathy for numerous groups, including but not limited to tailors, innkeepers, alchemists, astrologers, women, the Genovese, Protestants, constables, accountants, Jews, doctors, dentists, apothecaries, and hypocrites of all kinds.

He wrote too, in a satirical tone, La hora de todos y la Fortuna con seso (1699), with many political, social and religious allusions. He shows in it his ability in the use of language, with word-play and fantastic and real characters. La Isla de los Monopantos, a virulently antisemitic tale in the book portraying a secret Jewish plot to destroy Christendom with the assistance of the Monopanto chief Pragas Chincollos (a satirical portrayal of the Count-Duke of Olivares), is believed by some to have been a key influence in Hermann Goedsche's novel Biarritz, one of the unacknowledged sources of The Protocols of the Elders of Zion. A strident antisemite and opponent of the conversos, Quevedo had described the character of the Portuguese new Christians to Philip IV in his work Execración contra los judíos (a blend of a teological-medieval anti-Jewish worldview and racial antisemitism) in the following light: "mice they are, Lord, enemies of the light, friends of darkness, unclean, stinking, subterranean".

=== Political works ===
His political works include La política de Dios, y gobierno de Cristo (1617–1626; "The Politics of the Lord") and La vida de Marco Bruto (1632–1644; The Life of Marcus Brutus). According to writers Javier Martínez-Pinna and Diego Peña "in his writings he always manifested an obsession for the defense of the country, being convinced of the necessity and inevitability of the hegemony of Spain in the world, something that in the full Spanish decline had to do him much harm. It was also integrated in the tradition of laus Hispaniae, established by San Isidoro and used by Quevedo himself to try to recover the values that he thought, made the nation powerful. In a series of works like his defended Spain, he praised the greatness of his most prestigious compatriots, highlighting the Spanish superiority in the field of letters, visible in authors such as Fray Luis de León, Jorge Manrique or Garcilaso de la Vega, but also in the art of war, making possible the victory of Castilian weapons in their confrontations against Arabs and other European powers during the sixteenth century."

== Popular culture ==
- In Giannina Braschi's novel Yo-Yo Boing! contemporary Latin American poets have a heated, drunken debate about Quevedo's profile in defining the Spanish Golden Age.
- Quevedo is a main character in the Captain Alatriste books written by Arturo Pérez-Reverte. In the film Alatriste, he was played by Juan Echanove.
- He is a main character in the alternate history novel 1635: The Cannon Law by Eric Flint and Andrew Dennis.
- He is also a main character in the 2013 novel Sudden Death (Spanish title: Muerte súbita) by Álvaro Enrigue, where he is pitted in a tennis match against the Italian Baroque painter Caravaggio.

== Legacy ==
Like other writers of the Spanish Golden Age, Quevedo impacted writers after himself. Specifically writers like Carlos Fuentes admired him. Fuentes's admiration was not merely theoretical. Quevedo's poetry helped inspire the atmosphere of his celebrated novella Aura (1962), particularly its preoccupation with beauty, death, and the uncanny. Fuentes even described Quevedo as the unrivaled poet of death and love, comparing his literary stature to Shakespeare and John Donne.

== See also ==
- Siglo de Oro
- Spanish Literature
- Spanish poetry

== Bibliography ==
- Bleiberg, Germán; Ihrie, Maureen; Pérez, Janet, eds. (1993). Dictionary of the Literature of the Iberian Peninsula. Vol. 1: A–K. Westport, Conn.; London: Greenwood Press. p. 425. ISBN 0-313-28731-7.
- Crosby, James O., The sources of the text of Quevedo's Política de Dios. Millwood, New York: Kraus Reprint Co., 1975 (first edited, 1959). ISBN 0-527-20680-6.
- Ettinghausen, Henry, Francisco de Quevedo and the Neostoic movement. Oxford: Oxford University Press, 1972. ISBN 0-19-815521-2.
- Hennigfeld, Ursula, Der ruinierte Körper. Petrarkistische Sonette in transkultureller Perspektive. Würzburg: Königshausen & Neumann, 2008. ISBN 978-3-8260-3768-9.
- Quevedo, Francisco de. (2009). Christopher Johnson (ed.). Selected Poetry of Francisco de Quevedo: A Bilingual Edition. University of Chicago Press. ISBN 978-0-226-69889-2.
- Ariadna García-Bryce, Transcending Textuality: Quevedo and Political Authority in the Age of Print (University Park, Pennsylvania, Pennsylvania State University Press, 2011).
