= Castellar de Santiago =

Municipality in the province of Ciudad Real, Spain

- Municipality
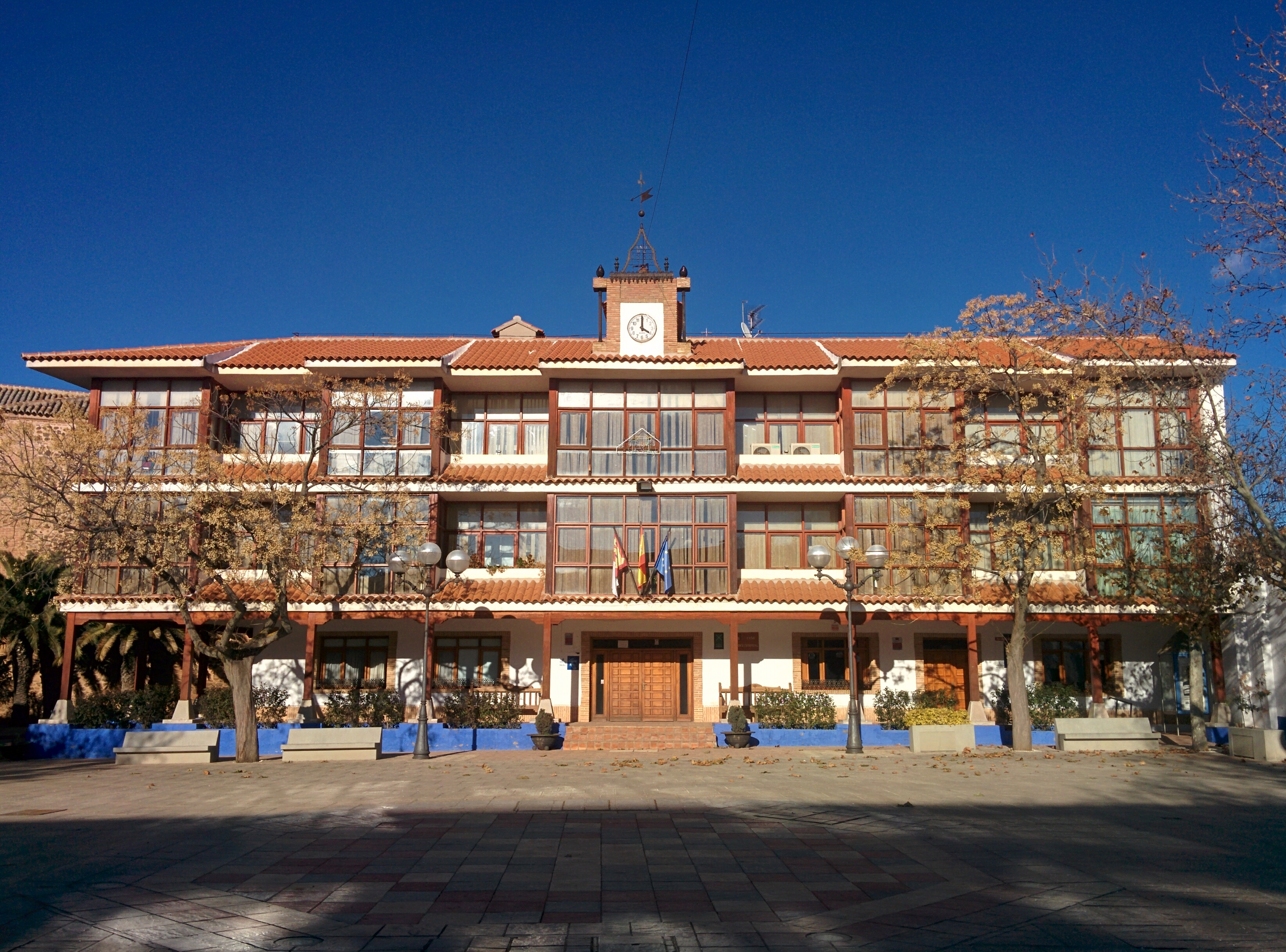
- Town hall

- Coat of arms

- Location in Spain
- Coordinates: 38°32′07″N 3°17′00″W
- Country: Spain
- Autonomous community: Castile-La Mancha
- Province: Ciudad Real
- Comarca: Campo de Montiel

Government
  - Mayor: Maria del Carmen Ballesteros Vélez (Spanish Socialist Worker's Party – PSOE)

Area
  - Total: 95.50 km^{2} (36.87 sq mi)
- Elevation: 821 m (2,694 ft)

Population (2025-01-01)
  - Total: 1,714
  - Density: 17.95/km^{2} (46.48/sq mi)
- Demonym: Castellareños
- Time zone: UTC+1 (CET)
  - Summer (DST): UTC+2 (CEST)
- Postal code: 13750
- Website: Official website

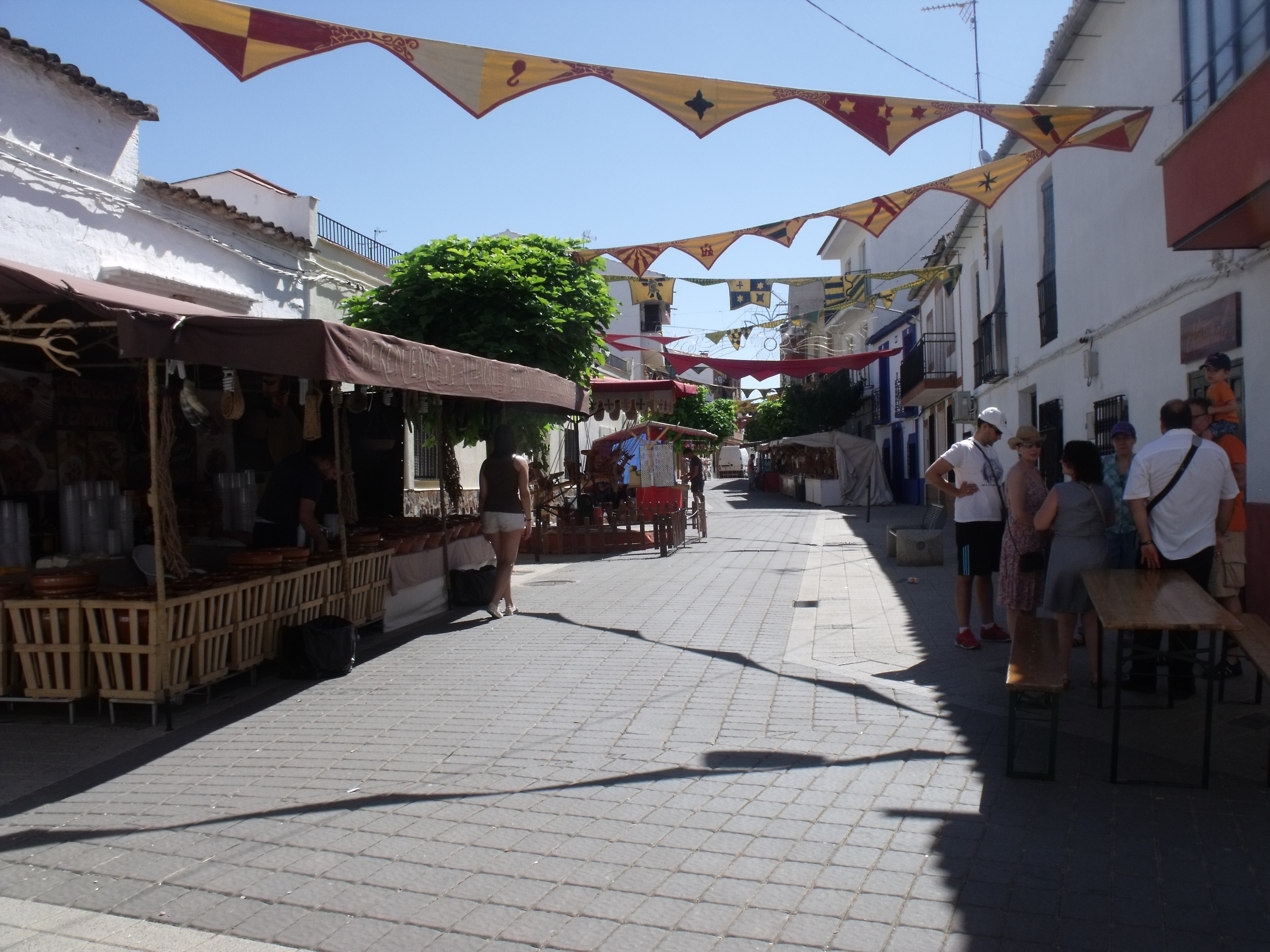
August Fair – Castellar de Santiago

Castellar de Santiago is a Spanish municipality in the province of Ciudad Real, Castilla–La Mancha. It is located southeast of Valdepeñas, about 150 kilometres from the closest large city, Córdoba, and 212 kilometres from Madrid. The village lies on the northern slope of the Sierra Morena mountain range. The area has abundant olive trees and holm oak trees. The Moors were impressed by its forestation and named it Mata de Vencáliz (Vencáliz Forest).

Castellar de Santiago celebrates several festivals through the year, mostly in the spring and summer months. The most significant is the Festival of the Bonfires from 13 to 16 September. It commemorates the Holy Christ of Mercy, which is the patron saint of Castellar. The closing ceremony on the night of the 16th features a fireworks display.
