= Villanueva de los Infantes, Ciudad Real =

Villanueva de los Infantes
- Municipality
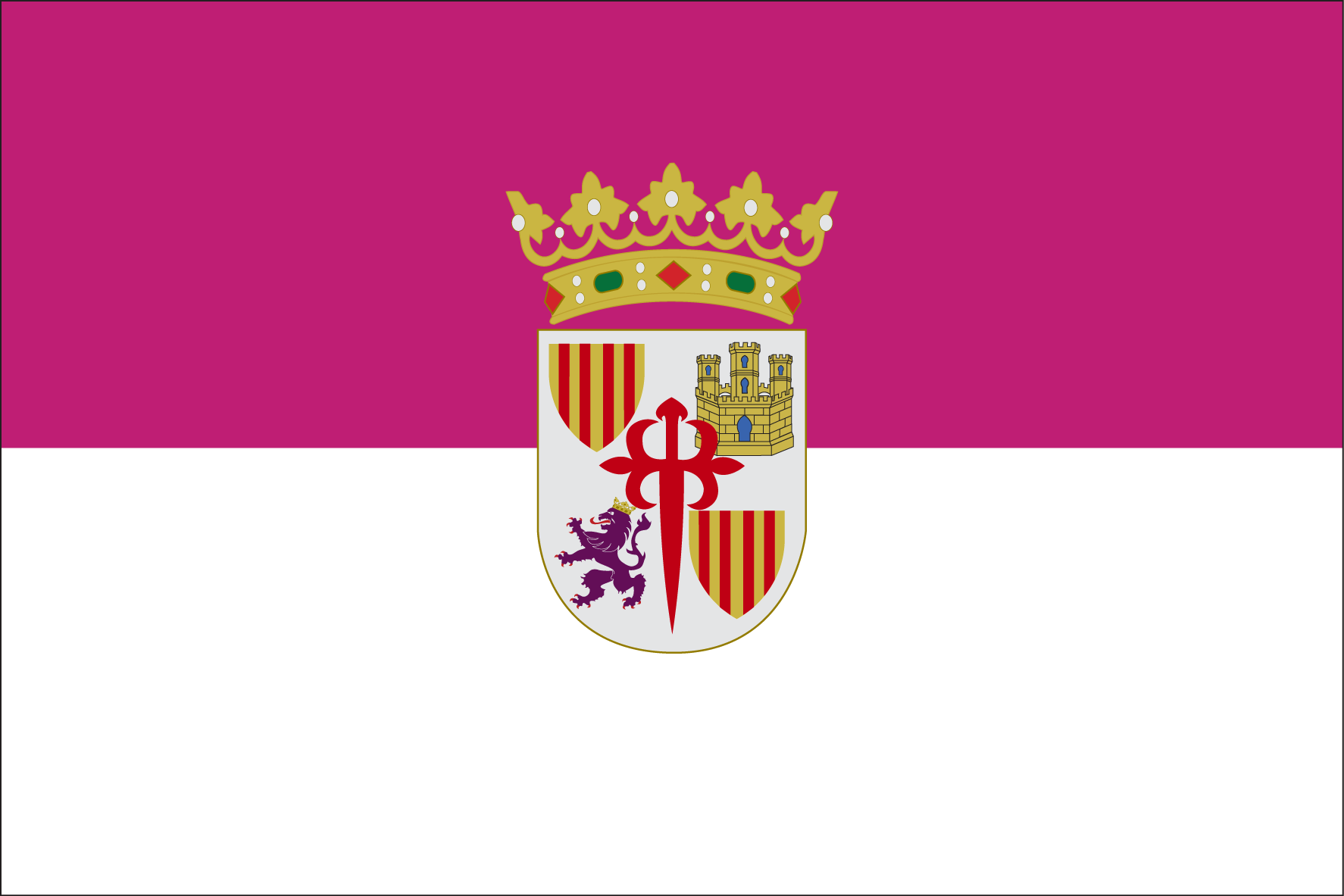
- Flag Coat of arms

- Location in Spain
- Coordinates: 38°44′3″N 3°1′0″W
- Country: Spain
- Autonomous community: Castilla–La Mancha
- Province: Ciudad Real
- Comarca: Campo de Montiel
- Commonwealth: Manserja

Government
  - Mayor: Antonio Ruiz Lucas

Area
  - Total: 135.06 km^{2} (52.15 sq mi)
- Elevation: 880 m (2,890 ft)

Population (2025-01-01)
  - Total: 4,733
  - Density: 35.04/km^{2} (90.76/sq mi)
- Demonym(s): infanteño (m), infanteña (f)
- Time zone: UTC+1 (CET)
  - Summer (DST): UTC+2 (CEST)
- Postal code: 13320

Villanueva de los Infantes is a municipality in the province of Ciudad Real, Castilla–La Mancha, Spain. It has a population of 4,785 people as of 2024.

It is the capital of the comarca (region) Campo de Montiel. It has been designated by the Universidad Complutense de Madrid as "El Lugar de La Mancha" (The Place in La Mancha) mentioned at the start of Don Quixote by Miguel de Cervantes. It is also known as the place where Francisco de Quevedo died; his remains were found in 2007 in the church of San Andrés Apostol (St. Andrew's Church). It is possible to visit the room in the convent where Quevedo spent his final days. The convent is now the church of Santo Domingo (Saint Dominic) and this room is situated inside it.

It is also the town where Thomas of Villanova grew up.

The economy is based on tourism, wine and olives.

The town should not be confused with another Villanueva de los Infantes, in the province of Valladolid, which is part of the Castile and León autonomous community.

The patron saint of Villanueva de Los Infantes is Our Lady the Virgin of La Antigua, a 13th-century carving known in the Middle Ages as Santa María de Jamila. It was crowned canonically on the last Saturday of May 2000, by the Prior Bishop of Ciudad Real, Rafael Torija de la Fuente. His feast day is celebrated on 8 September, coinciding with the Nativity of Our Lady. The patron saint is Santo Tomás de Villanueva, whose feast is celebrated on 18 September, with pontifical privilege (the feast of Santo Tomás de Villanueva is celebrated on 10 October).

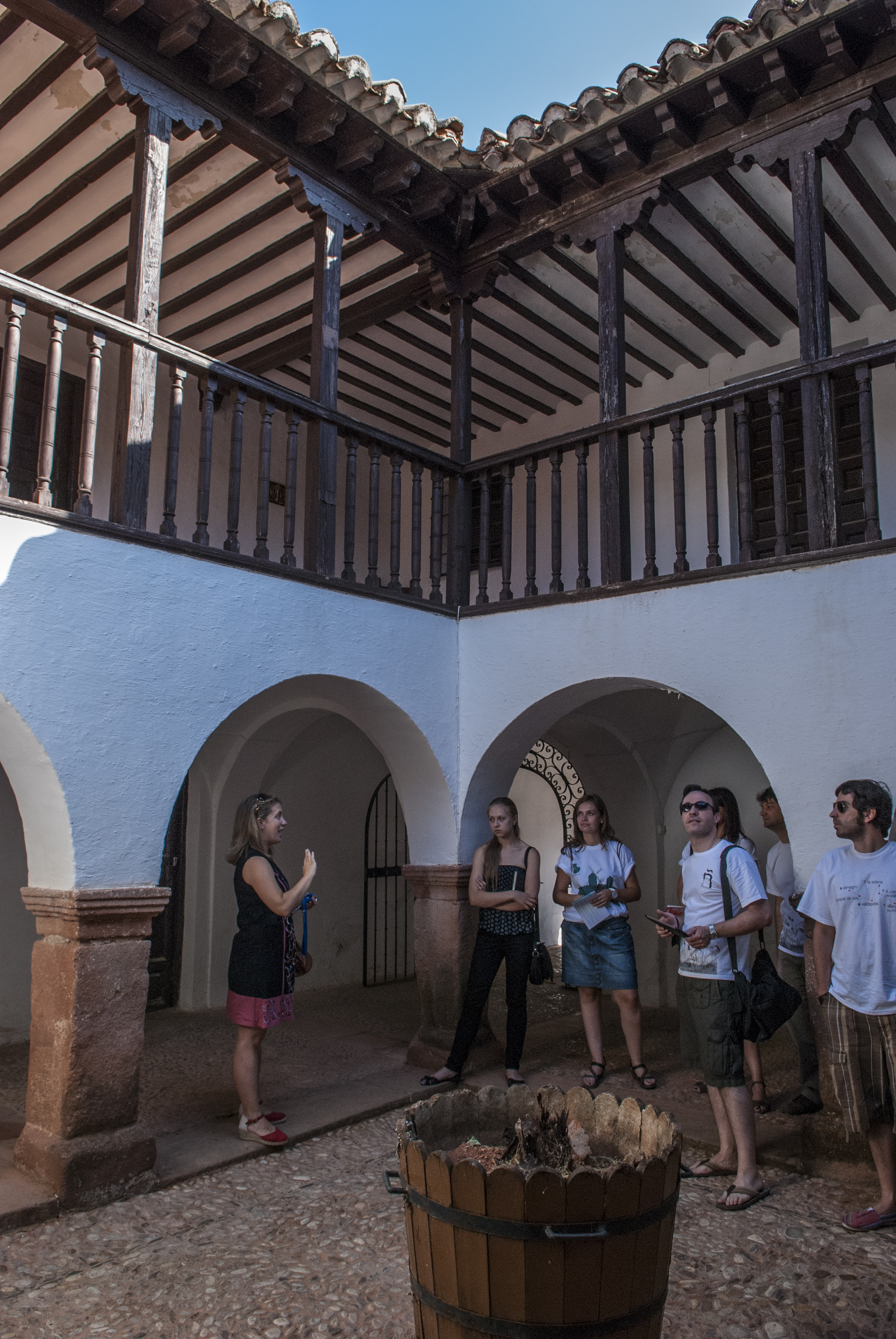
Villanueva de los Infantes is member of the cultural programme Ruta Ñ to promote the Spanish language and culture.

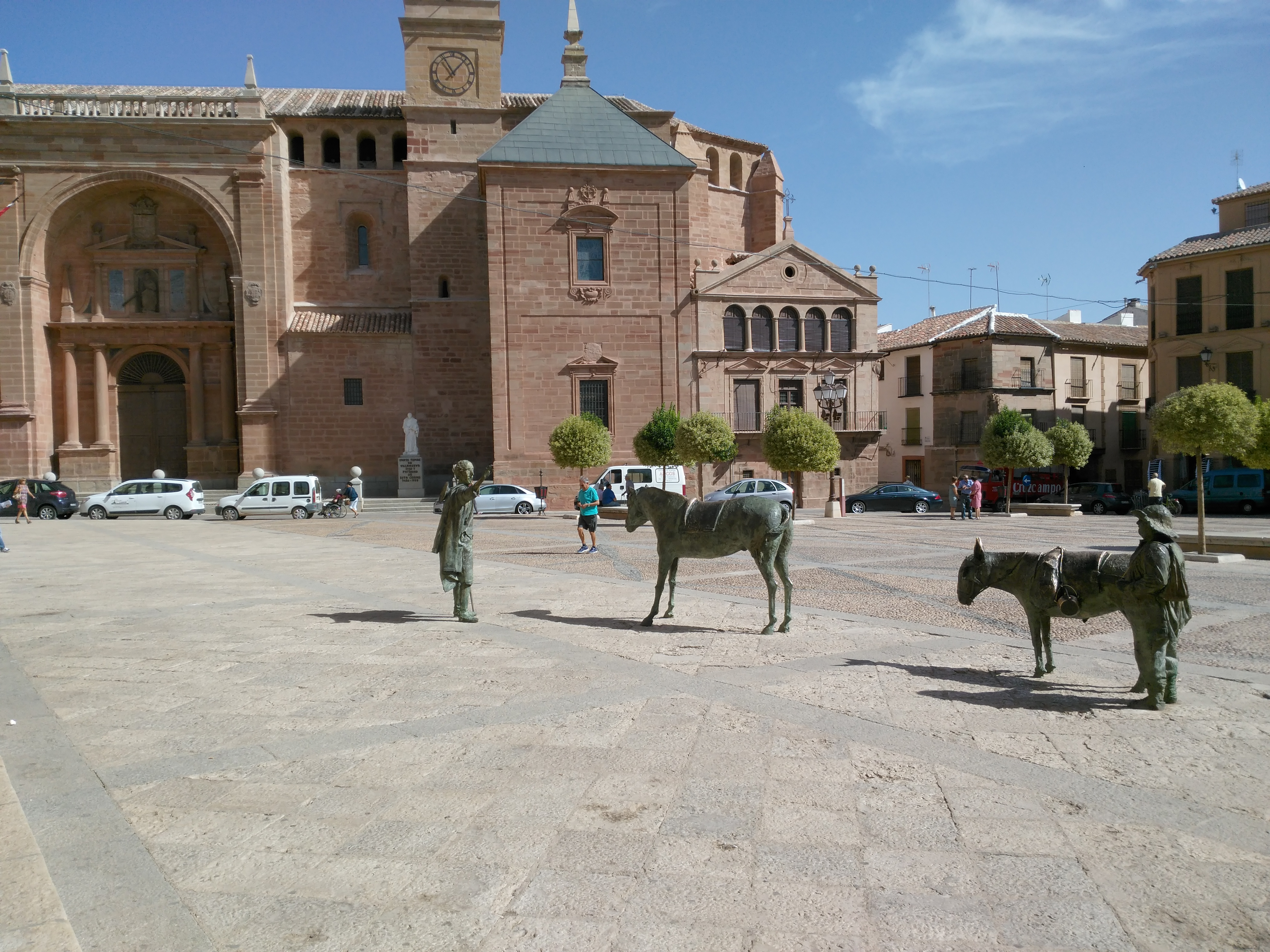
Main center (Plaza Mayor)
