= Los Sueños =

1627 book by Francisco de Quevedo

Los Sueños (Dreams or Visions) is a satirical prose work by the Spanish Baroque writer Francisco de Quevedo. Written between 1605 and 1622, it was first published in Barcelona in 1627 under the title Sueños y discursos de verdades descubridoras de abusos, vicios y engaños en todos los oficios del mundo ("Dreams and discourses on truths revealing abuses, vices and deceptions in all the professions and estates of the world"). Due to the strict censorship of the time, which had already caused problems for Quevedo, in 1631 expurgated versions of the Dreams were published under the name Juguetes de la niñez.

Los Sueños consists of five sections, each describing a satirical dream vision of the next world:

1. El Sueño del Juicio Final ("The Dream of the Last Judgement")
2. El Alguacil Endemoniado ("The Bedevilled Constable")
3. Sueño del Infierno ("The Vision of Hell")
4. El Mundo por de dentro ("The World from the Inside")
5. Sueño de la Muerte ("The Dream of Death")

Quevedo's pessimism, as befits the baroque, poses a divine justice closer to punishment than to grace. The stories oscillate between philosophical and moralistic disquisitions. He explains the types of men, how the human race is doomed and the nature of demons, and attacks the vices of his contemporaries.
