= Torre de Juan Abad =

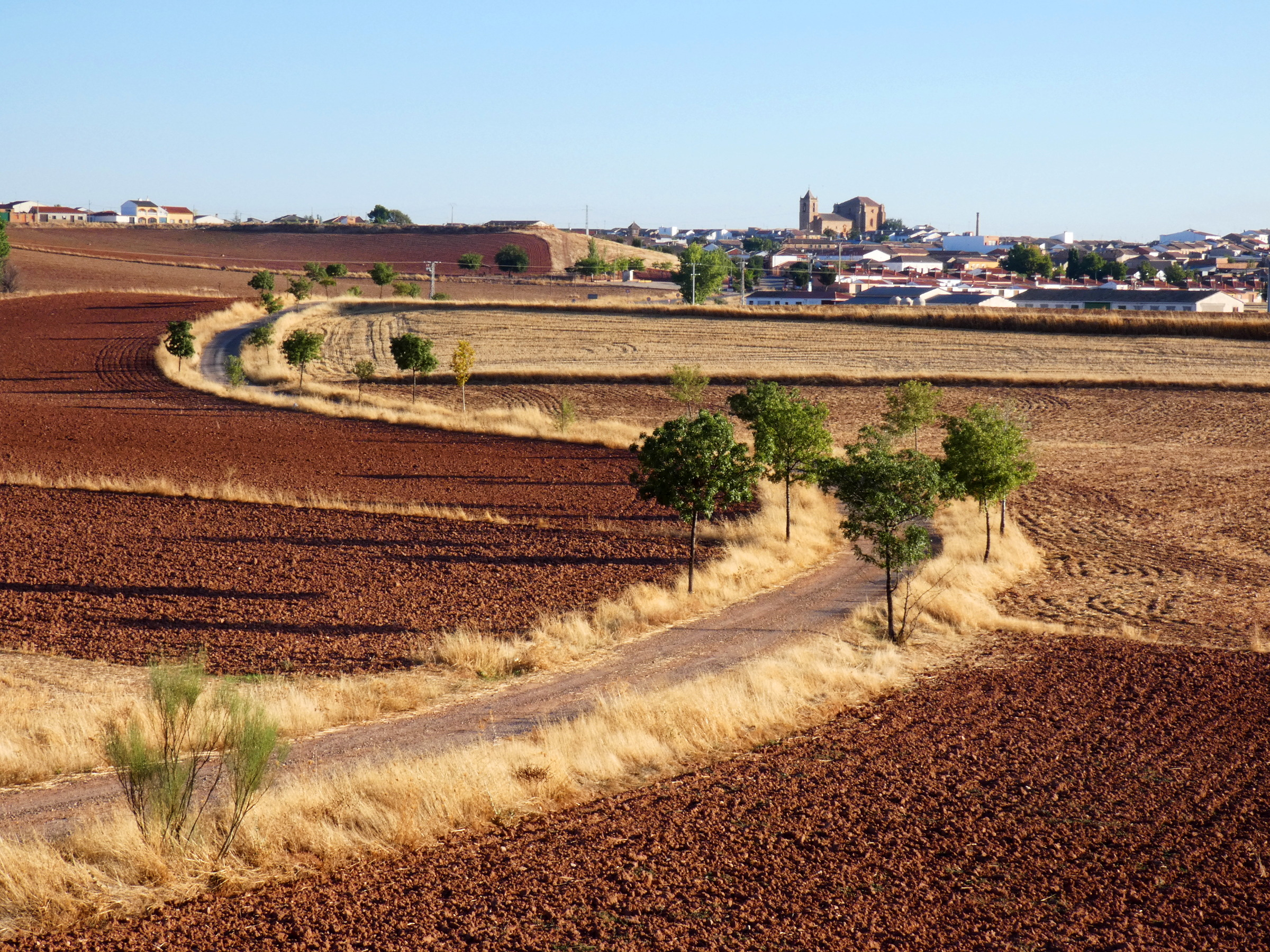

- Flag Coat of arms

- Location in Spain.
- Coordinates: 38°35′05″N 3°03′37″W
- Country: Spain
- Autonomous community: Castile-La Mancha
- Province: Ciudad Real
- Comarca: Campo de Montiel

Government
  - Mayor: María del Señor Fresneda Guerra (PSOE)

Area
  - Total: 399.73 km^{2} (154.34 sq mi)
- Elevation: 814 m (2,671 ft)

Population (2025-01-01)
  - Total: 928
  - Density: 2.32/km^{2} (6.01/sq mi)
- Demonym: Torreños
- Postal code: 13344
- Website: Official website

Torre de Juan Abad is a municipality in the province of Ciudad Real, Castile-La Mancha, Spain. It has a population of 1,139.
