= Villamanrique =

Coordinates: 38°33′0″N 3°0′0″W

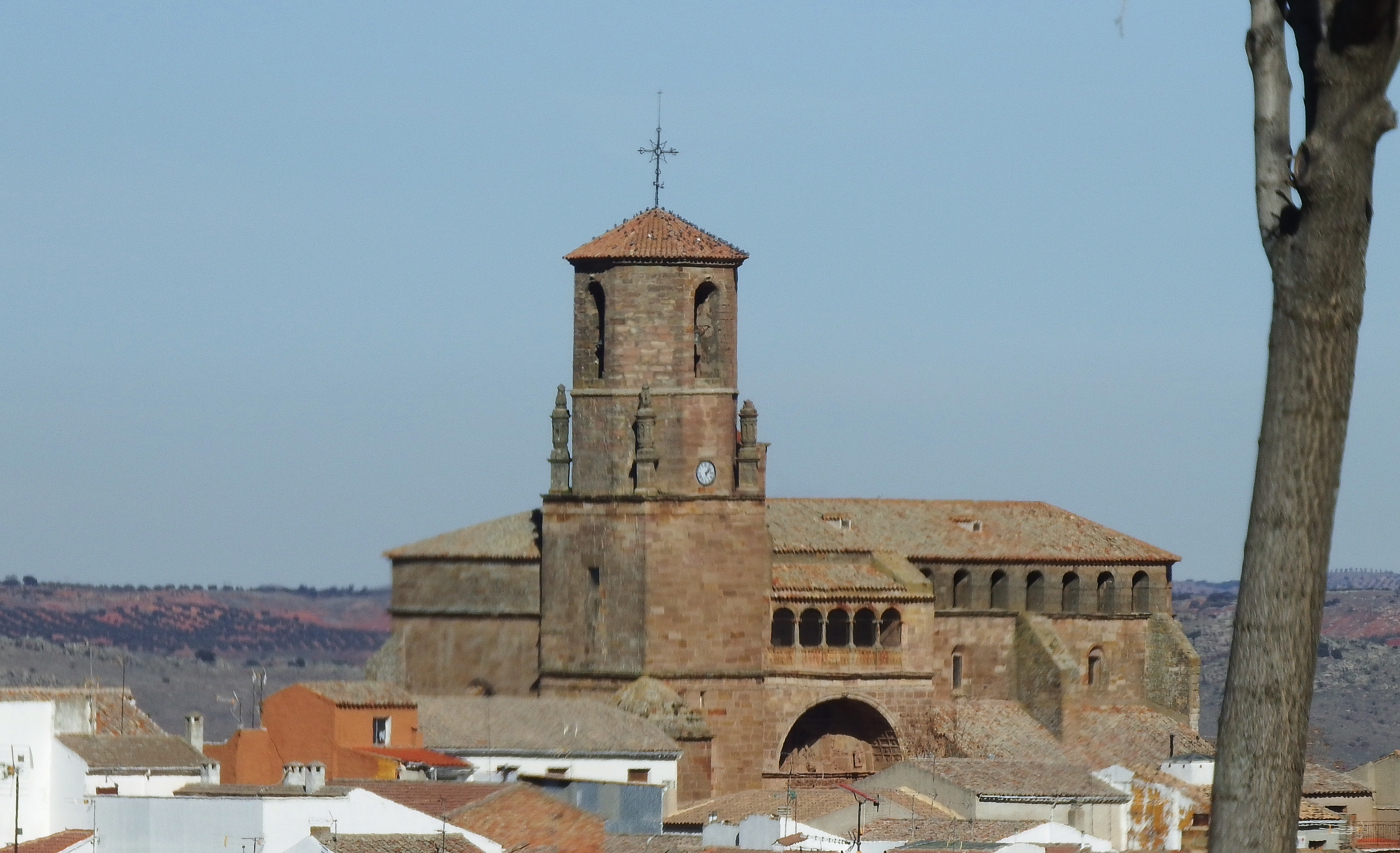
View of Villamanrique

Coat of arms of Villamanrique

Villamanrique is a municipality in Ciudad Real, Castile-La Mancha, Spain. It has a population of 1,559.
