= Terrinches =

Coordinates: 38°36′36″N 2°50′29″W

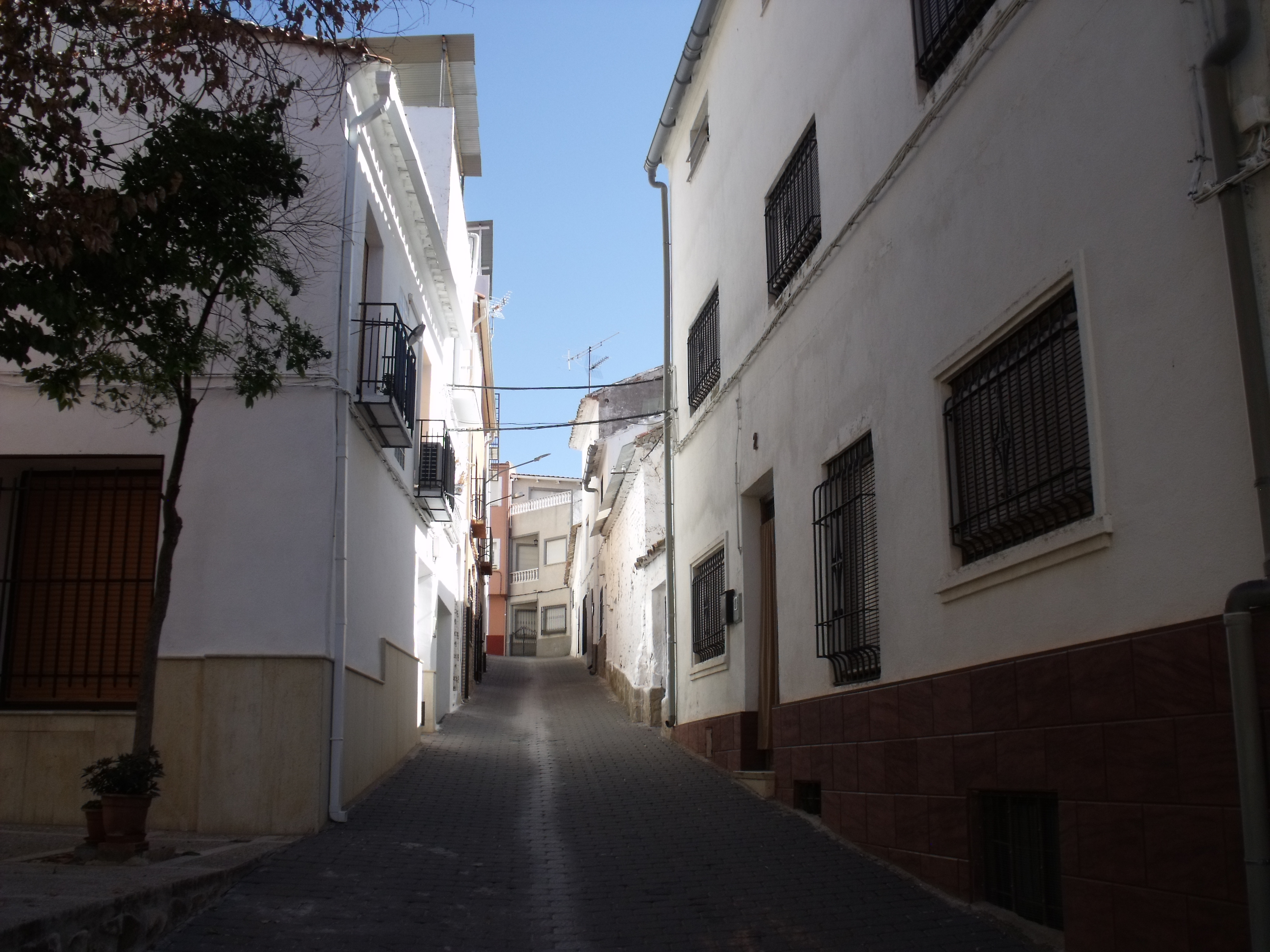
Street of Terrinches

Flag of Terrinches

Coat of arms of Terrinches

Terrinches is a municipality located in the province of Ciudad Real, Castile-La Mancha, Spain. It has a population of 773 (2014). It contains the church of Santo Domingo de Guzmán.
