= San Carlos del Valle =

Municipality in Castile-La Mancha, Spain

Coordinates: 38°50′N 3°14′W

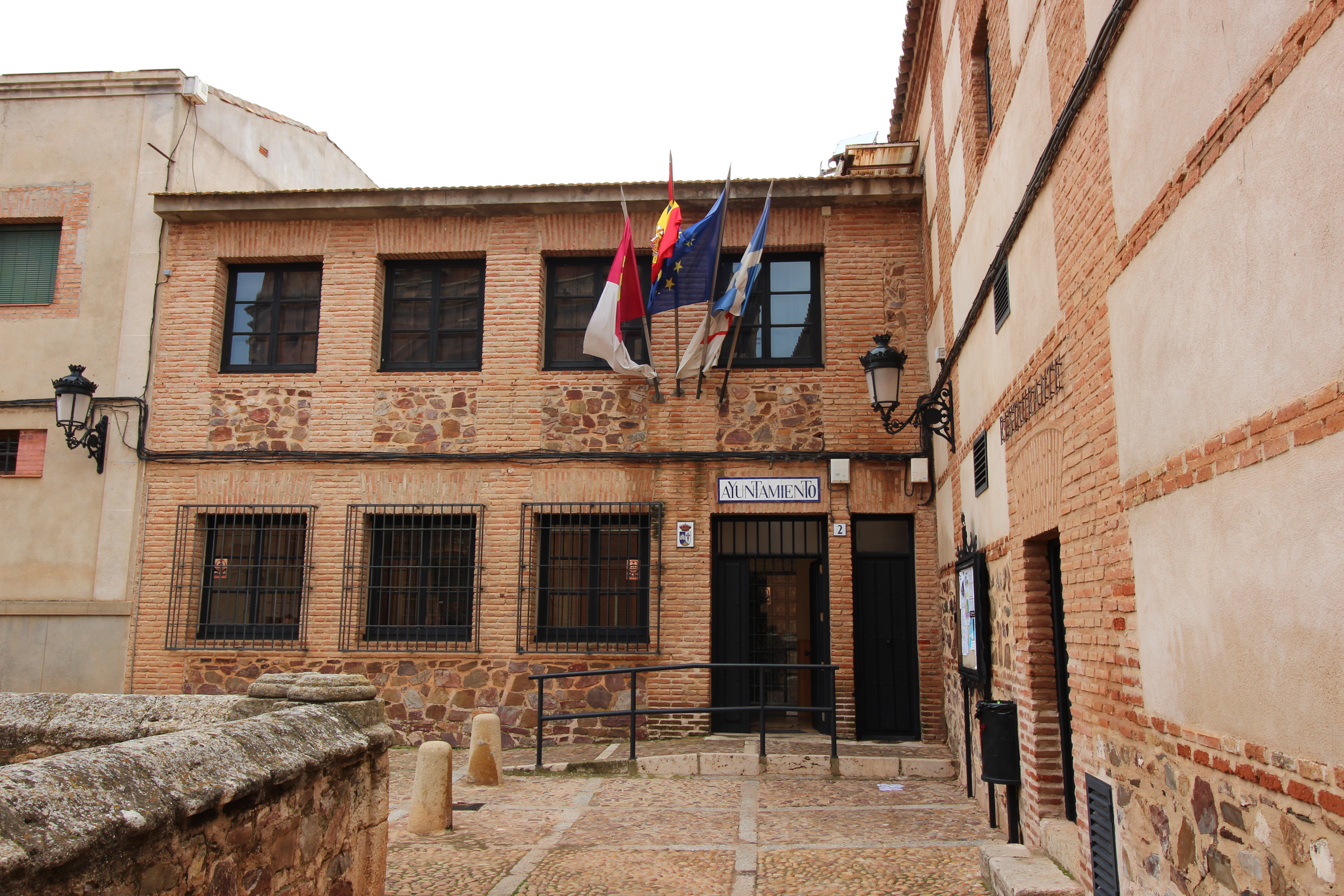
Ayuntamiento de San Carlos del Valle

San Carlos del Valle is a municipality in Ciudad Real, Castile-La Mancha, Spain. It has a population of 1,218.

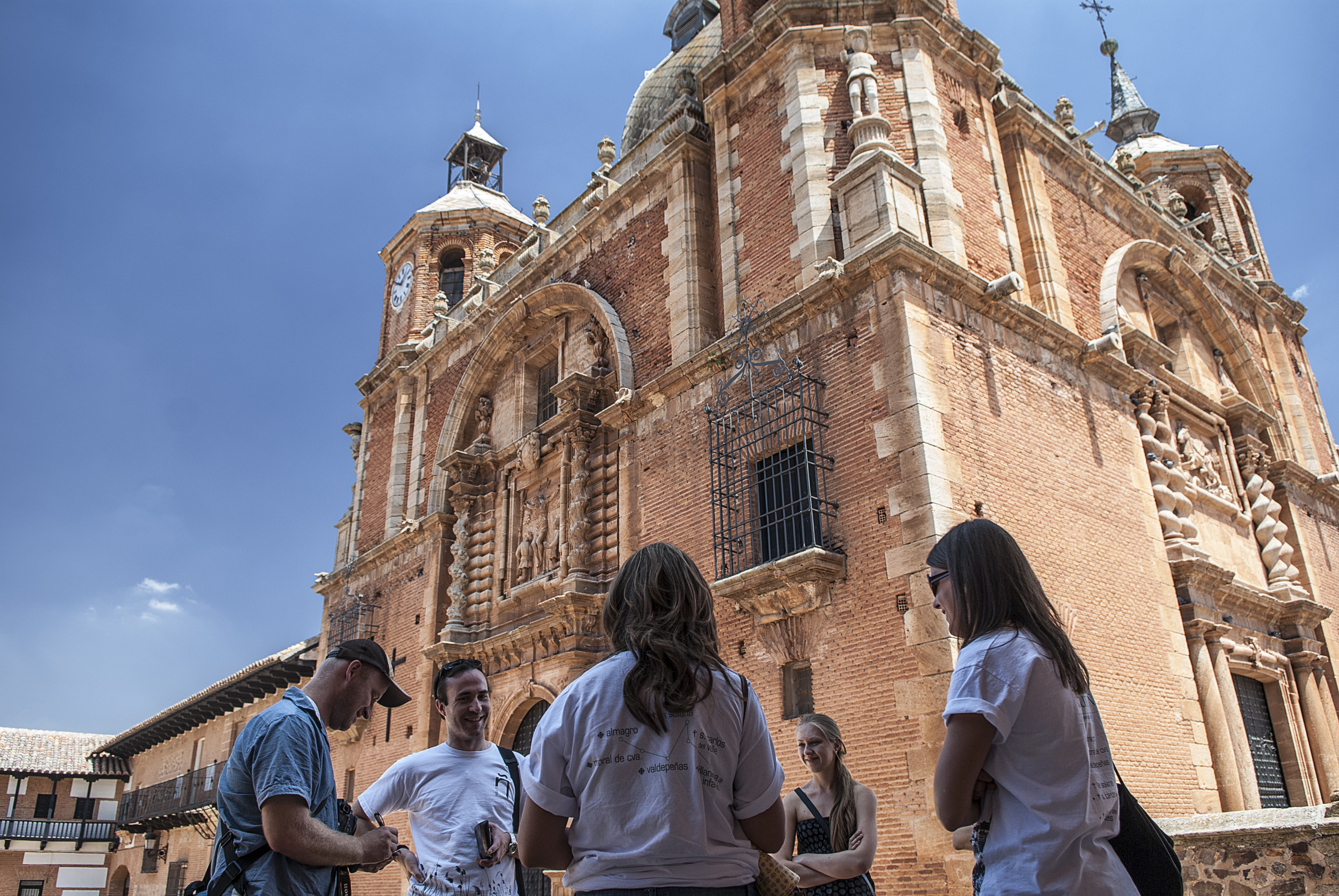
San Carlos del Valle is member of the cultural programme Ruta Ñ to promote the Spanish language and culture. Photo: Students of Spanish in the "Plaza Mayor" (San Carlos del Valle).

Flag of San Carlos de Valle

Coat of arms of San Carlos de Valle

== History ==
Although they found traces of prehistoric civilizations, Roman, Germanic or perhaps Arabic, the true origin of the town can be traced to the former chapel of Santa Elena, built in the twelfth or thirteenth century. The chapel stood until the eighteenth century, and one of its walls, the venerated image of Santo Cristo del Valle was painted.

During the sixteenth century, the first permanent settlement of the town developed around this hermitage. The rise in pilgrimages to pray to Christ prompted the Crown and the Council of Military Orders to build a new chapel, along with some facilities to provide shelter for the pilgrims.

Following the work carried out during the reign of King Philip V, which led to a rapid increase in population and urban redevelopment, the need for further development became apparent during the reign of King Charles III, under the guidance of Pablo de Olavide. Later, in December 1800, King Charles IV issued a Royal Charter that granted San Carlos del Valle independence, establishing it as the autonomous municipality it is today.

== Church of San Carlos del Valle ==
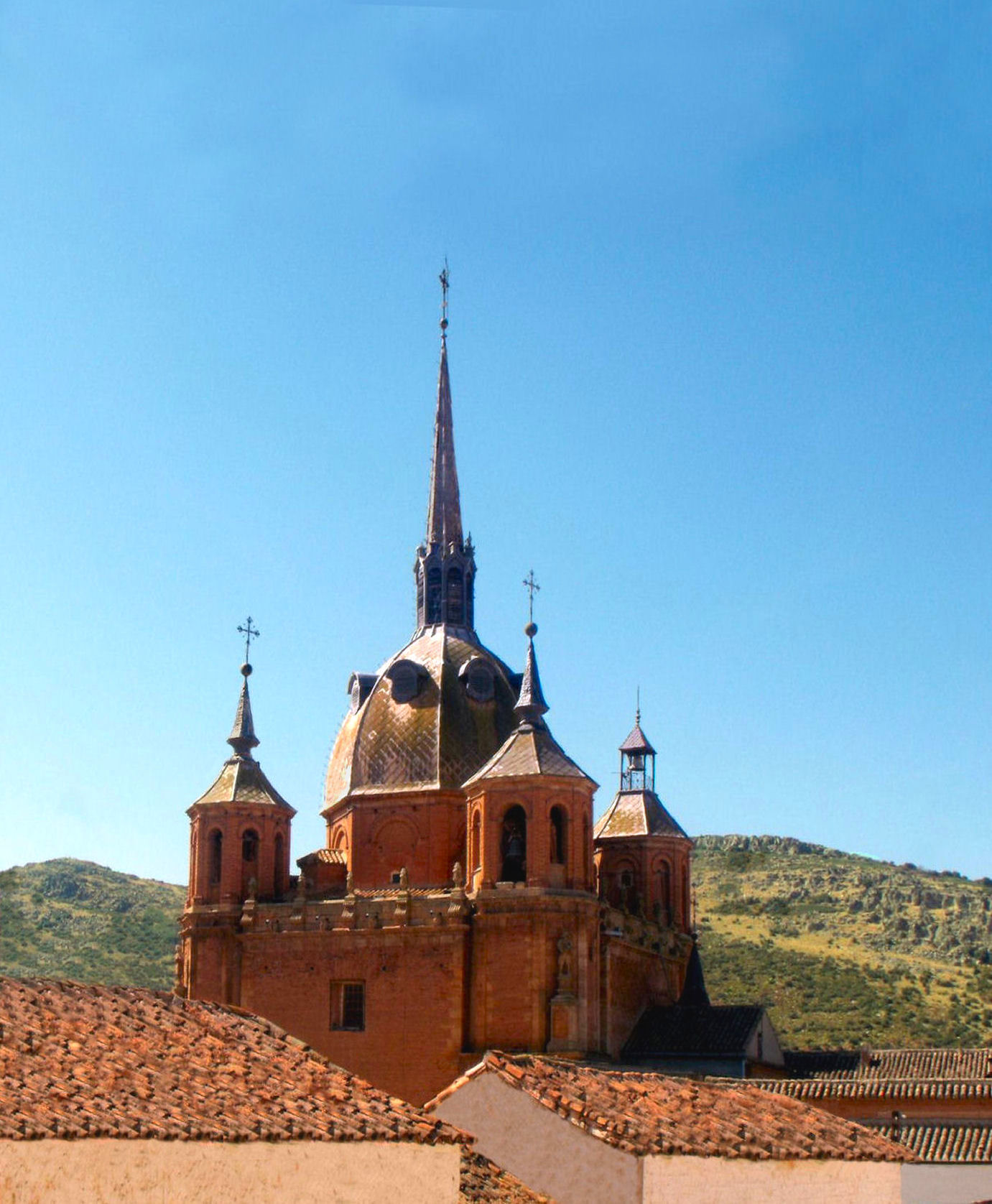
Church of San Carlos del Valle, panorama.

Located in Castilla la Mancha, this baroque church built between 1613 and 1729 with close resemblance to the Basilica of St. Peter in Rome, has four towers each crowned with a typical Madrid spire and a central dome high height of over 28 meters inside, topped with a very high acute arrow spire that reaches 47 meters from the ground. In 1993 the temple was declared a national monument of cultural interest.
