= Puebla del Príncipe =

Coordinates: 38°34′N 2°56′W

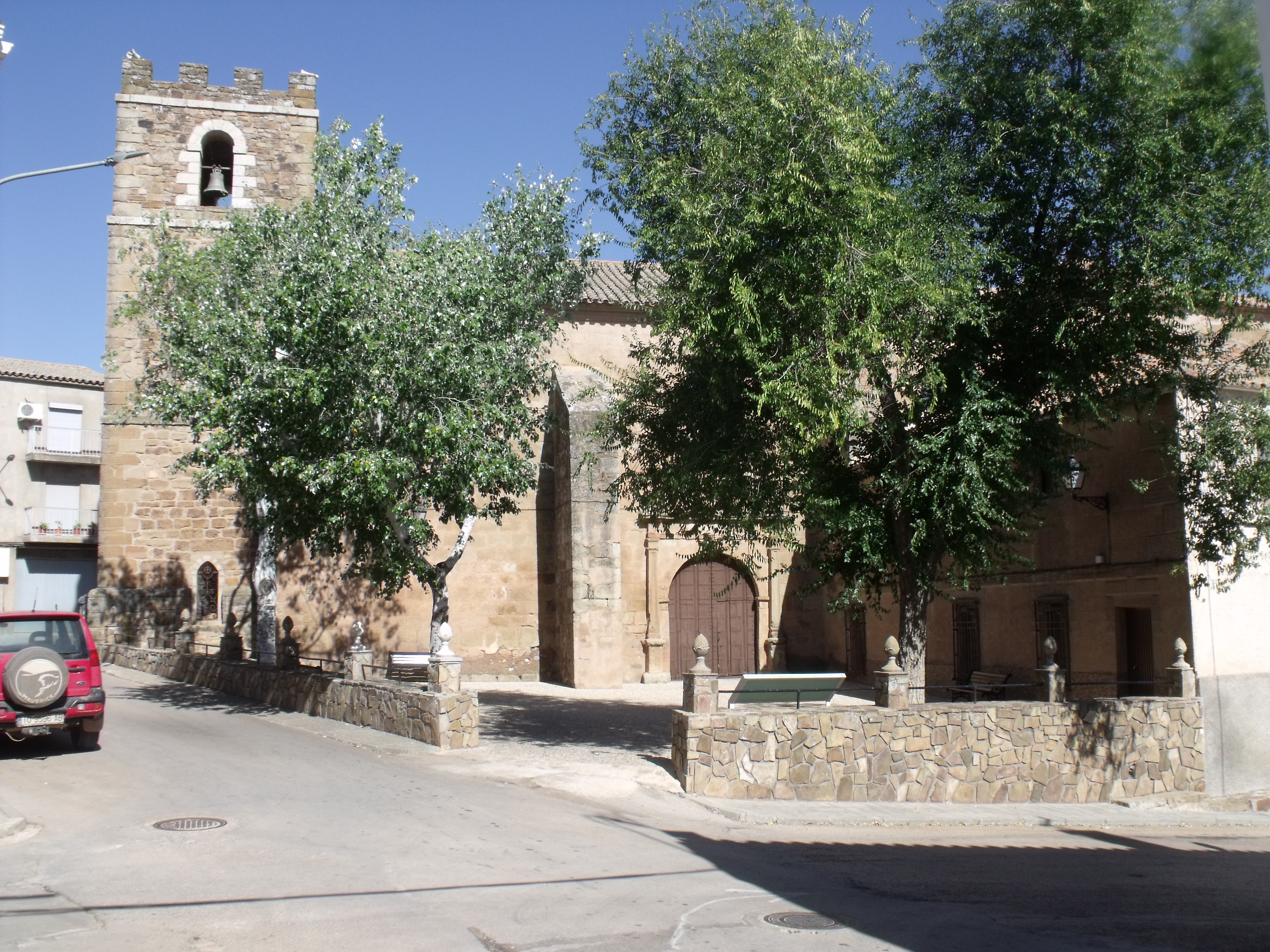
Street of Puebla del Príncipe

Coat of arms of Puebla del Príncipe

Puebla del Príncipe is a municipality in Ciudad Real, Castile-La Mancha, Spain. It has a population of 1,019.

During the Roman period, the town was called Mariana.
