= Membrilla =

Coordinates: 38°58′N 3°21′W

- Municipality
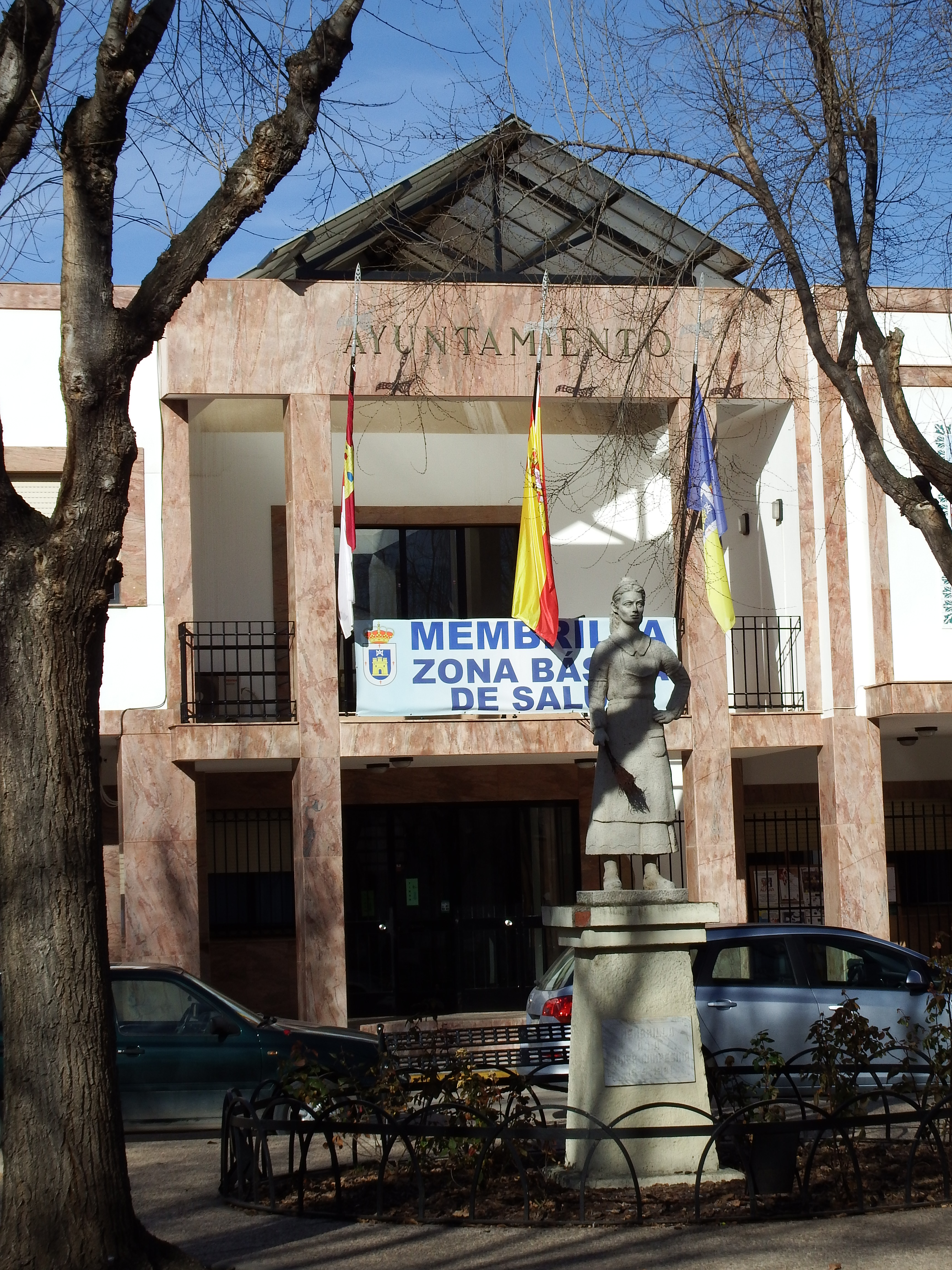
- Membrilla Town Hall

- Flag Coat of arms
- Interactive map of Membrilla
- Province: Ciudad Real
- Autonomous Community: Castilla–La Mancha
- Country: Spain

Membrilla is a municipality in the province of Ciudad Real, Castile-La Mancha, Spain. It has a population of 6,601.

== Sources ==
- Rubio Martínez, Carlos Javier (2017): El Campo de Montiel en la Edad Media. Ciudad Real: Biblioteca de Autores Manchegos
