= Ad maiorem Dei gloriam =

Latin phrase used by Christians

Ad maiorem Dei gloriam or Ad majórem Dei glóriam, (Note: When an "i" functions as a consonant in Latin, it is often represented with a "j".) also rendered as the abbreviation AMDG, is a Latin quotation which can be translated as "For the greater glory of God." It has been used as a rallying cry for Catholics throughout history, especially during the Thirty Years' War, and is currently the motto of the Society of Jesus (Jesuits), an order of the Catholic Church.

== Meaning ==
The origin of the phrase is attributed to the founder of the Jesuits, Saint Ignatius of Loyola, who intended it to serve as a cornerstone sentiment of the society's religious philosophy. The full phrase attributed to St. Ignatius is Ad maiorem Dei gloriam inque hominum salutem or "for the greater glory of God and the salvation of humanity." It is a summary of the idea that any work that is not evil, even one that would normally be considered inconsequential to the spiritual life, can be spiritually meritorious if it is performed in order to give glory to God.

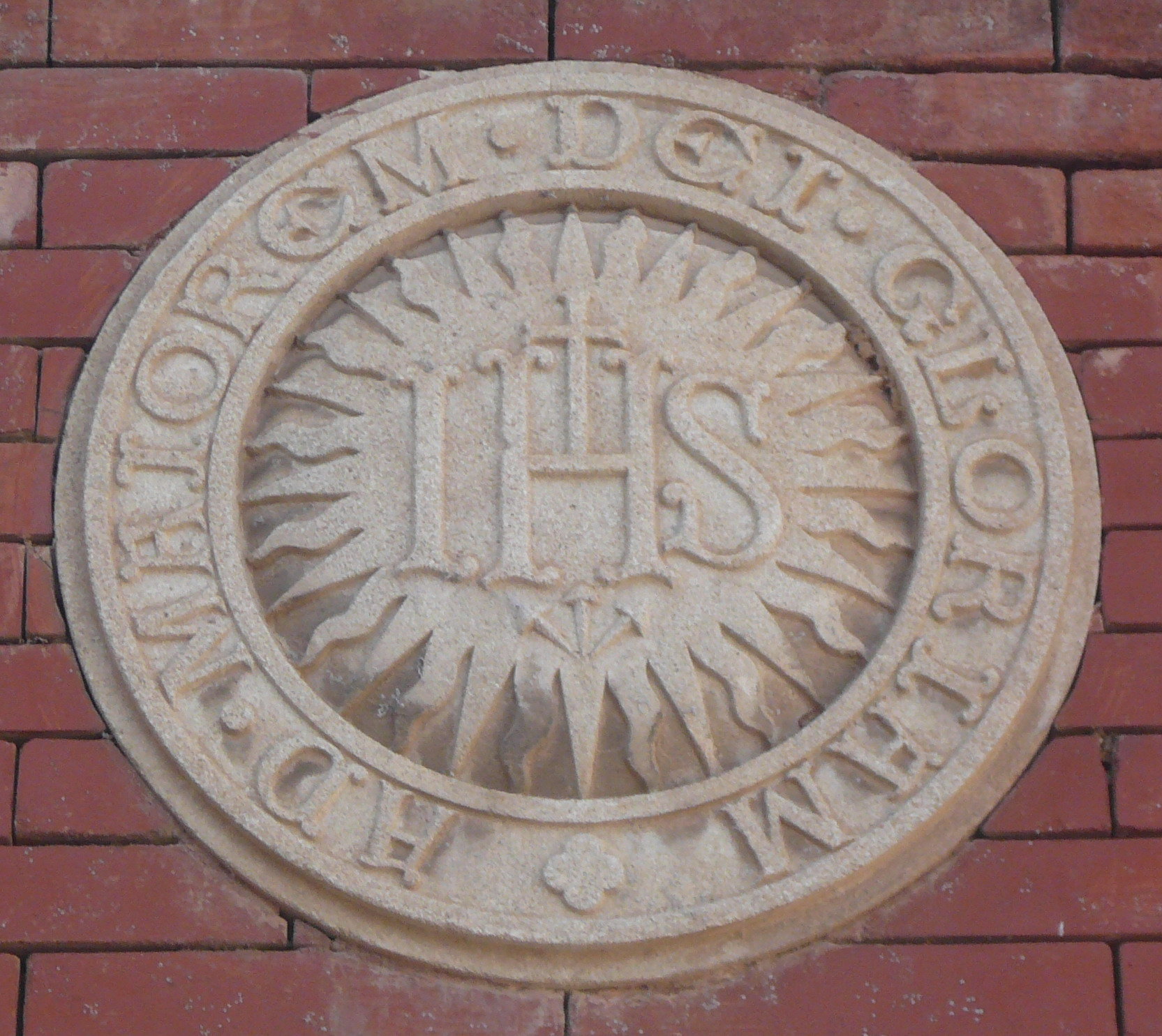
Ad maiorem Dei gloriam

A common Jesuit emblem depicts the mottos surrounding the initials IHS. IHS is a Greek monogram composed by three letters (iota, eta and sigma) for the first three letters in the name Jesus used since the 3rd century as an abbreviation. St. Ignatius of Loyola adopted the monogram in his seal as general of the Society of Jesus (1541), and thus it became the emblem of his institute. IHS was sometimes wrongly understood as 'Jesus Hominum (or Hierosolymae) Salvator', i.e. Jesus, the Saviour of men (or of Jerusalem=Hierosolymae).

== Use ==
When images of Saint Ignatius depict him carrying a book, the motto is often inscribed within—representative of the religious writings of the saint.

This phrase is the motto of many Jesuit educational institutions, including eight of the twenty-eight members of the Association of Jesuit Colleges and Universities, and many high schools worldwide, including, St. George's College in Jamaica. In Georgetown University's Gaston Hall, the phrase is followed by inque hominum salutem, producing a longer phrase: "For the greater glory of God and the salvation of humanity." Typical of the buildings of many Jesuit institutions, the cornerstones of those on Fordham University's campus bear the inscribed abbreviation “AMDG”, and the school's University Church hosts the 2,776-pipe “Maior Dei Gloria” organ, which derives its name from the motto.

It once was common for students at Jesuit schools and universities to write the initials at the tops of their pages, to remind them that even their schoolwork ought to be dedicated to the glory of God. (Note: "Fingleton was a strong Catholic, so much so that he began his cricket books with the letters that Catholic schoolchildren used to put at the top of every page of their exercise books—AMDG—which stood for 'Ad majorem Dei gloriam', meaning 'To the greater glory of God'.") The abbreviation was frequently included in the signatures of Pope John Paul II.

The motto of the Catholic fraternity Alpha Delta Gamma is Ad Dei Gloriam, which translates to "For the Glory of God." This motto is the origin of fraternity's name, as the Roman initials "ADG" are rendered in Greek with the letters alpha, delta, and gamma.

In High Church Anglican contexts the phrase is also used, and it appears in initials (A.M.D.G.) on official church memorials to the soldiers of Great Britain and Ireland who fell in France and Belgium during the First World War. It is repeatedly quoted by the Jesuit character in Flann O'Brien's book The Hard Life. Anglo-Catholic modern composer Sir Edward Elgar used it as the dedication of his setting of Cardinal Newman's poem The Dream of Gerontius. In 1939, Benjamin Britten wrote a choral piece A.M.D.G. (Ad Majorem Dei Gloriam) of seven settings of Gerard Manley Hopkins.

In 2014, American liturgical composer, Dan Schutte wrote the piece Ad Maiorem Dei Gloriam for worship hymnals and missals. Ad majorem Dei gloriam appears in the credits of Martin Scorsese's movie about Jesuits in Japan, Silence. The 2000 novel La carta esférica by Arturo Pérez-Reverte and its 2007 film version deal with the wreck of the Dei Gloria, a fictional ship freighted by the Jesuits. The Grand Inquisitor in Fyodor Dostoyevsky's The Brothers Karamazov uses the motto via the character Ivan.

== See also ==
- Besiyata Dishmaya
- Basmala
- Deus vult
- Insha'Allah
- Soli Deo gloria
