= The Club Dumas =

1993 novel by Arturo Pérez-Reverte

- Cover of Random House edition
- Author: Arturo Pérez-Reverte
- Original title: El Club Dumas
- Translator: Sonia Soto
- Language: Spanish
- Genre: Postmodern literature; crime novel; mystery novel
- Publisher: Alfaguara
- Publication date: 1993
- Publication place: Spain
- English publication date: 1996
- Media type: Print (Hardcover)

The Club Dumas (original Spanish title: El Club Dumas) is a 1993 novel by Arturo Pérez-Reverte. The book is set in a world of antiquarian booksellers, echoing his previous 1990 work The Flanders Panel.

The story follows the adventures of a book dealer, Lucas Corso, who is hired to authenticate a rare manuscript by Alexandre Dumas, père. Corso's investigation leads him to seek out two copies of a (fictional) rare book known as De Umbrarum Regni Novem Portis (Of the Nine Doors of the Kingdom of Shadows), a title alluding to the nine circles of hell mentioned in Dante's Inferno. Corso encounters a host of intriguing characters on his journey of investigation, including devil worshipers, obsessed bibliophiles and a hypnotically enticing femme fatale. Corso's travels take him to Madrid (Spain), Sintra (Portugal), Paris (France), and Toledo (Spain).

The Club Dumas is full of details ranging from the working habits of Alexandre Dumas to how one might forge a 17th-century text, as well as insight into demonology.

== Plot summary ==
Lucas Corso is a middle-aged book dealer with a reputation of doing anything—regardless of legality—for his privileged clientele. While in Madrid attempting to authenticate a previously unknown rough draft of The Three Musketeers, he is summoned to Toledo by Varo Borja, a notoriously eccentric and wealthy collector.

Borja has obtained a copy of a legendary book, Of the Nine Doors of the Kingdom of Shadows, whose author was burned at the stake by the Inquisition. The book purportedly contains instructions for summoning the Devil. Only one copy of the book is supposed to have survived, but Borja claims three exist, two of which are elaborate forgeries. He hires Corso to compare the three copies and obtain the legitimate one by any means necessary. He promises to pay handsomely and cover all expenses.

Corso agrees, but continues to research the partial Dumas draft. The widow of the draft's previous owner, Liana Taillefer, insists the draft is a fake, but offers to buy it from Corso. After several encounters, she attempts to seduce Corso to obtain the draft; when he succumbs to her charms but refuses to surrender the manuscript, she becomes his enemy. She imagines herself as Milady de Winter, and uses a male associate (whom Corso nicknames "Rochefort") to follow Corso and attempt to retrieve the manuscript by force.

Corso confers with the Ceniza Brothers, book restoration experts with extensive knowledge of forgery. They give him basic knowledge to help him compare the copies of The Nine Doors.

On his way to Lisbon to visit the owner of one of the copies, he encounters a beautiful blonde with striking green eyes. She identifies herself as Irene Adler, and suggests that she is a fallen angel. They part company before he meets with Victor Fargas. Fargas is a renowned collector who has been selling off his extensive library to maintain his ancestral mansion. Corso compares Fargas' copy of The Nine Doors to Borja's, and finds subtle differences in the illustration plates. Most bear the initials of the book's notorious author, but some of the plates bear the initials "L.F."

As Corso returns to his hotel, Irene guards Corso against an attack by Rochefort. Corso leaves her to arrange a robbery of Fargas' mansion to obtain his copy of the book. Irene informs him that Fargas has been murdered and his copy has been burned. She and Corso leave for Paris.

Corso confers with Replinger, an antiquarian and Dumas scholar, who authenticates the Dumas manuscript. As they talk, Corso spies Liana. He returns to his hotel and bribes the concierge to locate her hotel. Irene visits him, and they discuss theology; she implies that she is a witness to the events of the war in heaven.

Corso visits Baroness Ungern, whose charitable institution possesses the largest occult collection in Europe, including the third copy of The Nine Doors. They discuss the book's author, before Corso blackmails her with photo evidence of her Nazi sympathies so she will let him examine her copy. Irene calls to warn Corso that "Rochefort" is waiting outside. The Baroness translates the illustration captions while Corso compares Ungern's copy to Borja's.

Later, Corso realizes that, while none of the three sets match each other, the plates bearing the initials L.F. form a complete set of nine without duplications, and realizes the nine illustrations form a list of instructions for the famed summoning ritual. Rochefort attacks again, and is again repelled by Irene.

Using the concierge's information, Corso confronts Liana and her associate, but Rochefort renders him unconscious. When he revives, Borja's copy and the Dumas manuscript are gone. He learns that the Baroness has been killed in a fire at her library.

Using Liana's obsession with Milady de Winter, he traces her to Meung, where he is captured by Rochefort. Rochefort is instructed by a man calling himself Richelieu to bring Corso to a nearby castle. Richelieu introduces him to the Club Dumas, a literary society of wealthy Dumas enthusiasts, who are gathered for their annual banquet. Corso is astonished to find that they only want to see the Dumas manuscript, and know nothing about The Nine Doors. He is invited to stay for the party, but chooses to leave.

Corso returns to Spain to confront Borja. Irene insists that she is a fallen angel who has wandered the earth for millennia searching for him. Corso does not question this, and finds himself even more strongly attracted to her. He accuses Borja of being responsible for both murders. Borja, intending to use the ritual described by the book's true nine plates to summon the Devil and gain ultimate knowledge, has destroyed his entire library to prevent others from following his lead. Corso demands payment, but Borja ignores him and begins the ritual. Corso leaves in disgust; as he leaves, he hears Borja's screams of anguish as the ritual goes awry, remembering the Ceniza Brothers' discourse on false books and realizing one of the plates is a forgery. He joins Irene outside, and surmises that each of them will get the devil they deserve.

== Literary references ==
The Club Dumas refers to many books. Several of the references are not to a work itself, but to a singular instance of the physical book, such as a rare edition or type of binding. Several of these books are inventions of Perez-Reverte.

=== Real books ===
The works of Alexandre Dumas, père, the source of the eponymous title, influence nearly every element of the plot. The books mentioned are as follows:

- The Three Musketeers. Edition by Miguel Guijarro in four volumes, with engravings by Ortega.
- The Countess de Charny. Edition by Vicente Blasco Ibáñez, in eight volumes, part of the "Illustrated Novel" collection.
- The Two Dianas. Edition in three volumes.
- The Count of Monte Cristo. Edition by Juan Ros in four volumes, with engravings by A. Gil.
- The Forty-Five.
- The Queen's Necklace.
- The Companions of Jehu.
- From Madrid to Cadiz.
- Queen Margot.
- Le Chevalier de Maison-Rouge. Apparent original title: The Knight of Rougeville.

Also mentioned are works by Dumas's ghostwriter Auguste Maquet, including in particular, Le Bonhomme Buvat or the Conspiracy of Cellamare, published in Le Siècle, the magazine in which The Three Musketeers originally appeared between March and July 1844.

Other works mentioned are:

- Richard Adams, Watership Down.
- Georg Agricola, De re metallica Latin edition by Froben and Episcopius, Basle, 1556.
- Cornelius Agrippa, De Occulta Philosophia Latin edition, Cologne, 1533.
- Dante Alighieri, The Divine Comedy.
- the works of John James Audubon. A hypothetical find that would make Corso and La Ponte very wealthy.
- the works of Azorín.
- Berengario de Carpi, Tractatus.
- Luís de Camões, Os Lusíadas. First edition in four volumes, Ibarra 1789.
- Jacques Cazotte, The Devil in Love.
- Miguel de Cervantes, Los trabajos de Persiles y Sigismunda, an edition "signed by Trautz-Bauzonnet" or "Hardy".
- Francisco Jiménez de Cisneros, Complutensian Polyglot Bible. Six-volume edition.
- Simone de Colines, Praxis criminis persequendi, 1541.
- Jacques Collin de Plancy, Dictionnaire Infernal, 1842.
- Arthur Conan Doyle, Sherlock Holmes stories including A Study in Scarlet and A Scandal in Bohemia.
- Nicolaus Copernicus, De revolutionis celestium. Second edition, Basle 1566.
- Corpus Hermeticum. Cited as mentioning the Delomelanicon.
- Gatien de Courtilz de Sandras, Mémoires de M. d'Artagnan.
- Martin Delrio, Disquisitionum Magicarum, 1599/1600. A three-volume work on demonic magic.
- Charles Dickens, The Pickwick Papers. Spanish edition translated by Benito Pérez Galdós.
- Fyodor Dostoevsky, The Brothers Karamazov.
- Albrecht Dürer, De Symmetria, Paris/Nuremberg 1557, in Latin.
- any version of Faust
- Paul Feval, "nine books including Le Bossu and a quotation from Le Bossu heading Chapter 3"
- Leonardo Fioravanti, Compendio dei secreti, 1571.
- Francesco Maria Guazzo, Compendium Maleficarum.
- Patricia Highsmith, Carol.
- Victor Hugo, The Hunchback of Notre-Dame.
- Pope Innocent VIII, Summis desiderantes affectibus.
- Athanasius Kircher, Oedipus Aegyptiacus. Rome, 1652.
- Heinrich Kramer, Malleus Maleficarum. 1519 Lyon edition.
- Pierre de La Porte, Memoirs. Written by "a man in the confidence of Anne of Austria".
- Charles Maturin, Melmoth the Wanderer. Being read by "Irene Adler" in the hotel after Corso has been to visit Fargas.
- Herman Melville, Moby-Dick. The book forms the initial basis of the friendship between Lucas Corso and Flavio La Ponte.
- Prosper Mérimée, Corsican Revenge.
- John Milton, Paradise Lost.
- Margaret Mitchell, Gone with the Wind.
- Marco Polo, The Book of Wonders.
- Pierre Alexis Ponson du Terrail, Rocambole. In forty volumes.
- Marcel Proust, Swann's Way, Volume One: In Search of Lost Time.
- Nicholas Remy, Daemonolatreiae libri tres.
- Lucas de Rene, The Knight with the Yellow Doublet
- Roederer, Political and Romantic Intrigue from the Court of France.
- Fernando de Rojas, La Celestina.
- Rafael Sabatini, Captain Blood.
- Rafael Sabatini, Scaramouche.
- Hartmann Schedel, Nuremberg Chronicle.
- Ludovico Maria Sinistrari, De Daemonialitate et Incubis et Succubis. 1680 manuscript, London 1875 printed edition.
- Stendhal, The Charterhouse of Parma. Supposedly translated by the narrator.
- Eugène Sue, The Mysteries of Paris.
- Leo Tolstoy, War and Peace.
- Jacobus de Voragine, Golden Legend Edition by Nicolas Kesler, Basle 1493.
- Vulgata Clementina.
- Michel Zevaco, The Pardellanes.

=== Fictional books ===
Occultist works published by the fictional historical author Aristide Torchia in Venice:

- De Umbrarum Regni Novem Portis, Venice, 1666. translated as The Nine Doors [or Gates] to the Kingdom of Shadows. While itself fictional, many aspects of The Nine Doors appear to be heavily inspired by the Hypnerotomachia Poliphili of Colonna (1499).
- Key to Captive Thoughts, 1653.
- A Curious Explanation of Mysteries and Hieroglyphs.
- The Three Books of the Art, 1658.
- Nicholas Tamisso, The Secrets of Wisdom, 1650.
- Bernard Trevisan, The Lost Word ("Verbum Dismissum"), 1661. A fictional edition of an actual 14th-century alchemy treatise.

Other occultist writings in novel The Club Dumas:

- Asclemandres. A book mentioning the existence of the Delomelanicon
- Delomelanicon, or Invocation of Darkness. A long-destroyed book containing a formula for summoning the Devil, supposedly written by Lucifer himself.
- De origine, moribus et rebus gestis Satanae.
- Dissertazioni sopra le apparizioni de' spiriti e diavoli.
- Destructor omnium rerum.
- Theatrum Diabolicum.
- De Magna Imperfectaque.

Books written by the character Baroness Ungern (inspired by Helena Blavatsky):

- Isis, the Naked Virgin. (Refers to Isis unveiled by Helena Blavatsky)
- The Devil, History and Legend.

Books by Boris Balkan:

- Lupin, Raffles, Rocambole, and Holmes.
- Dumas: the Shadow of a Giant.
- Crozet, Encyclopedia of Printers and Rare and Curious Books
- Mateu, Universal Bibliography. A 1929 rare book guide used by Corso and his rivals.
- Julio Ollero, Dictionary of Rare and Improbable Books.

Books by Enrique Taillefer:

- The Thousand Best Desserts of La Mancha. A cooking book.
- The Secrets of Barbecue. A cooking book.
- The Dead Man's Hand, or Anne of Austria's Page. Taillefer's unpublished novel, cribbed largely from Angeline de Gravaillac.
- Amaury de Verona, Angeline de Gravaillac, or Unsullied Virtue, published in the 19th century in The Popular Illustrated Novel.

Books by an unnamed Nobel Prize-winning author:

- I, Onan
- In Search of Myself
- Oui, C'est Moi.

Book by Don Jaime Astarloa, (hero of Perez-Reverte's novel The Fencing Master):

- Treatise on the Art of Fencing.

=== Aristide Torchia ===
Aristide Torchia, a fictional historical author from the novel, has been referred to in other media including The Ninth Gate (a film based on the novel), and video game Max Payne.

The fictional character Torchia was born in 1620. He was apprenticed in Leyden under the Elzevir family. After returning to Venice he published small works on philosophical and esoteric themes. In 1666, Torchia published De Umbrarum Regni Novem Portis (The Nine Doors to the Kingdom of Shadows), which was in turn based on the Delomelanicon, or Invocation of Darkness, a work supposedly written by Lucifer and that would allow the reader to summon devils. The Inquisition condemned Torchia for magic and witchcraft and burned him at the stake in 1667.

== Film adaptation ==
Roman Polanski's film The Ninth Gate (1999) was adapted from Pérez-Reverte's novel. While following the same basic plotline for the first two-thirds of the film, the finale is greatly altered in the movie. Several characters' roles diminish, expand, merge, swap or disappear completely, and one of the novel's most important subplots – the Dumas connection – is removed entirely.

== Awards ==
In 1998, The Club Dumas was nominated for the Anthony Award for Best Novel, the Macavity Award for Best Novel, and the World Fantasy Award for Best Novel.
