= The Fencing Master (film) =

- Theatrical release poster
- Spanish: El maestro de esgrima
- Directed by: Pedro Olea
- Screenplay by: Antonio Larreta; Francisco Prada; Arturo Pérez-Reverte; Pedro Olea
- Based on: The Fencing Master by Arturo Pérez Reverte
- Produced by: Pedro Olea; Antonio Cardenal
- Starring: Omero Antonutti; Assumpta Serna; Joaquim de Almeida; José Luis López Vázquez; Alberto Closas; Miguel Rellán
- Cinematography: Alfredo Mayo
- Edited by: José Salcedo
- Music by: José Nieto
- Production companies: Origen PC; Altube; ICAA
- Distributed by: United International Pictures
- Release date: 18 September 1992
- Running time: 88 minutes
- Country: Spain
- Language: Spanish

The Fencing Master (Spanish: El maestro de esgrima) is a 1992 Spanish adventure film directed by Pedro Olea, and starring Omero Antonutti, Assumpta Serna, and Joaquim de Almeida. Based on the 1988 novel of the same name by Arturo Pérez-Reverte, the plot follows a renowned fencer who becomes the mentor for a young woman seeking a means of revenge.

It was selected as the Spanish entry for the Best Foreign Language Film at the 65th Academy Awards, but was not accepted as a nominee.

== Plot ==
Set in 1868 Madrid against the backdrop of the buildup to the Glorious Revolution, the plot tracks fencing master Jaime de Astarloa and his new pupil Adela de Otero.

== Cast ==
- Omero Antonutti as Jaime de Astarloa
- Assumpta Serna as Adela de Otero
- Joaquim de Almeida as Luis de Ayala
- José Luis López Vázquez as Jenaro Campillo
- Alberto Closas as Álvaro Salanova
- Miguel Rellán as Agapito Cárceles

== Production ==
The film is an Origen PC and Altube production.

== Release ==
Distributed by United International Pictures, the film was released theatrically in Spain on 18 September 1992.

== Accolades ==
Year	Award	Category	Nominee(s)	Result	Ref.
1993	7th Goya Awards	Best Film		Nominated	
1993	7th Goya Awards	Best Director	Pedro Olea	Nominated	
1993	7th Goya Awards	Best Adapted Screenplay	Antonio Larreta, Arturo Pérez Reverte, Francisco Prada, Pedro Olea	Won	
1993	7th Goya Awards	Best Actress	Assumpta Serna	Nominated	
1993	7th Goya Awards	Best Original Score	José Nieto	Won	
1993	7th Goya Awards	Best Editing	José Salcedo	Nominated	
1993	7th Goya Awards	Best Cinematography	Alfredo F. Mayo	Nominated	
1993	7th Goya Awards	Best Art Direction	Luis "Koldo" Vallés	Nominated	
1993	7th Goya Awards	Best Production Supervision	Antonio Guillén Rey	Nominated	
1993	7th Goya Awards	Best Costume Design	Javier Artiñano	Won	
1993	7th Goya Awards	Best Makeup and Hairstyles	Josefa Morales, Romana González	Nominated	

== See also ==
- List of Spanish films of 1992
- List of submissions to the 65th Academy Awards for Best Foreign Language Film
- List of Spanish submissions for the Academy Award for Best Foreign Language Film
