= Arturo Pérez-Reverte =

Spanish writer and journalist

The Most Excellent Arturo Pérez-Reverte
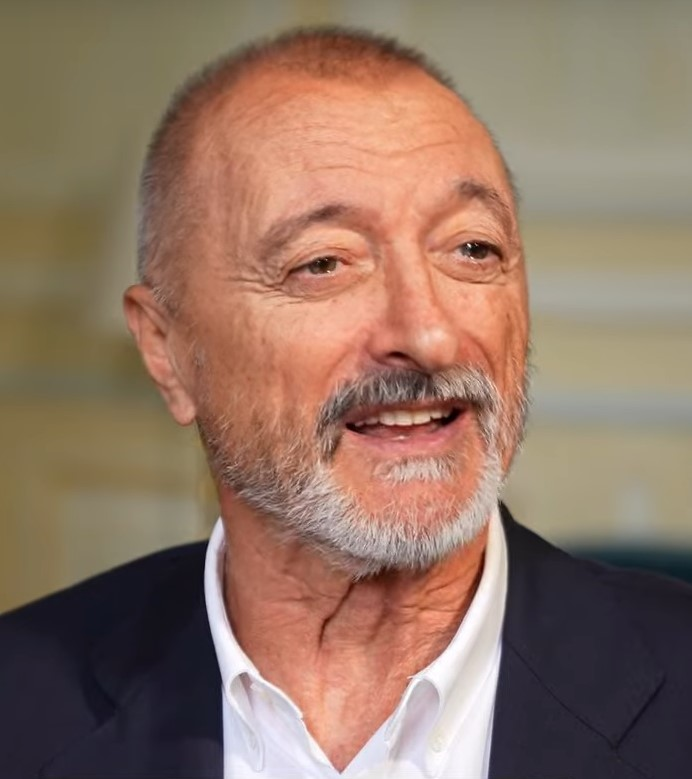
- Pérez-Reverte in 2024
- Born: Arturo Pérez-Reverte Gutiérrez; 25 November 1951 (age 74); Cartagena, Murcia, Spain
- Occupations: Journalist, novelist
- Writing career
- Language: Spanish
- Genre: Historical novel
- Notable work: The Adventures of Captain Alatriste

Seat T of the Real Academia Española
- Incumbent
- Assumed office 12 June 2003 (Note: Elected on 23 January 2003)
- Preceded by: Manuel Alvar
- Website: www.perezreverte.com

Arturo Pérez-Reverte Gutiérrez (born 25 November 1951) is a Spanish novelist and journalist. He worked as a war correspondent for RTVE for 21 years (1973–1994). His first novel, El húsar, set in the Napoleonic Wars, was published in 1986.

He is well known outside Spain for his Captain Alatriste series of adventure novels, which have been translated into multiple languages. Since 2003 he has been a member of the Royal Spanish Academy.

== Writing ==
Pérez-Reverte's novels are usually centered on one strongly defined character, and his plots move along swiftly, often featuring a narrator who is part of the story but apart from it. Most of his novels take place in Spain or around the Mediterranean. They often draw on numerous references to Spanish history, the colonial past, art and culture, ancient treasures, and the sea. The novels frequently deal with some of the major issues of modern Spain, such as drug trafficking or the relationship between religion and politics.

Often, Pérez-Reverte's novels have two plots running in parallel with little connection between them except for shared characters. For example, in The Club Dumas, the protagonist is searching the world for a lost book and keeps meeting people who parallel figures from Dumas's novels; in The Flanders Panel, a contemporary serial killer is juxtaposed with the mystery of a 500-year-old assassination.

In his often polemical newspaper columns and the main characters of his novels, Pérez-Reverte frequently expresses pessimism about human behaviour, shaped by his wartime experiences in such places as El Salvador, Croatia, or Bosnia. His views have also been shaped by his research for crime shows.

Throughout his career, and especially in its latter half, he has been noted for cultivating his trademark maverick, non-partisan, and, at times, abrasive persona. This has occasionally been a source of conflict with other journalists and writers. He originally refused to have his novels translated from the original Spanish to any language other than French. However, English translations were eventually published for some of his works, and most of his work is also available in Portuguese and Polish.

Pérez-Reverte was elected to seat T of the Real Academia Española on 23 January 2003; he took up his seat on 12 June the same year.

Themes such as the hero's tiredness, adventure, friendship, the journey as danger, death as the last journey, culture and memory as the only salvation that allows understanding reality, enduring pain and knowing the identity of the person and the world are frequent in his novels. The writer's view of existence in general is bleak. He hates Christian humanism and believes that pagan philosophy has a more accurate view of the world. Typical Revertian characters are the weary hero in hostile territory with a dark past and the femme fatale. Among the traits of the characters, moral ambiguity stands out.

In the articles he publishes every Sunday in XLSemanal magazine, he harshly criticizes postmodernity, political correctness, gender ideology, neoliberalism, neoconservatism, critical pedagogy, the European Union, inclusive language and woke thought.

He regrets that society is conditioned by the "whim of minorities" and that Europe, "the moral reference of the West", copies the values of society in the United States, which he considers "sick and hypocritical" . He asserts that political correctness has its origins in Anglo-Saxon puritanism.

In 1998, he published a very harsh article against global capitalism that prophesied the 2008 financial crisis. This article was very successful on the internet when the crisis happened in Spain.

An active user on Twitter, he has already created numerous controversies. In a controversial article he compared the European refugee crisis with the barbarian invasions that led to the fall of the Roman Empire. However, he was awarded the "Premio Don Quijote" of journalism.

=== Awards and recognition ===
- The Painter of Battles won the 2008 Premio Gregor von Rezzori award for foreign fiction translated into Italian.
- In 2016 Pérez-Reverte was named as one of the 10 most important writers of the year by the Spanish national newspaper ABC.

== Personal life ==
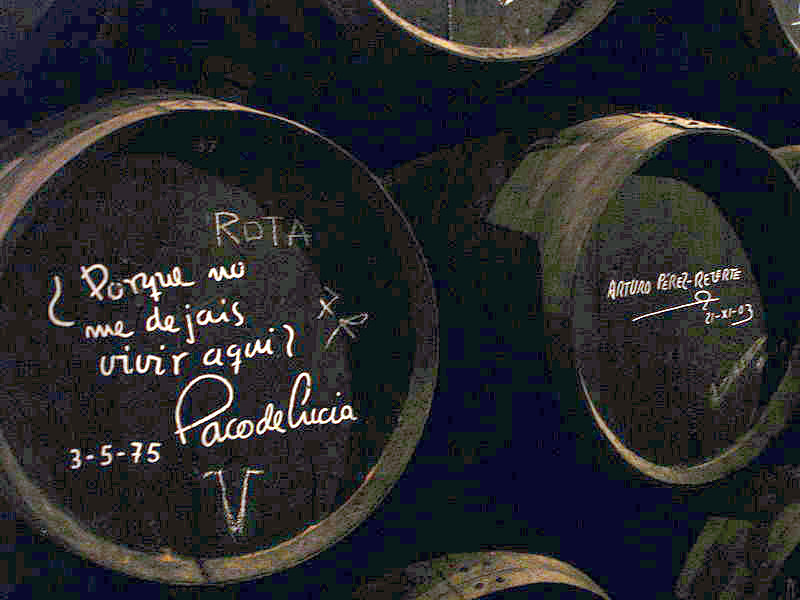
Sherry barrel signed by Pérez-Reverte

Pérez-Reverte started his journalistic career writing for the now-defunct newspaper Pueblo and then for Televisión Española (the Spanish state-owned television broadcaster), often as a war correspondent. Becoming weary of the internal affairs at TVE, he resigned as a journalist and decided to work full-time as a writer.

His teenage daughter Carlota was billed as a co-author of his first Alatriste novel. He lives between La Navata (near Madrid) and his native Cartagena, from where he enjoys sailing solo in the Mediterranean. He was a friend of Javier Marías, who presented Pérez-Reverte with the title of Duke of Corso of the Kingdom of Redonda micro nation.

His nephew Arturo Juan Pérez-Reverte is a professional footballer playing for FC Cartagena.

Perez-Reverte has said that he owns a library which has an estimated 32,000 books.

== Controversies ==
Mexican novelist Verónica Murguía accused Arturo Pérez-Reverte of plagiarizing her work. On 10 November 1997 Murguía published a short story, titled "Historia de Sami", in the magazine El laberinto urbano. Months later, in March 1998, Pérez-Reverte published a story in El Semanal, with the title "Un chucho mejicano", bearing close similarities in narration, chronology, phrases, and in the anecdote. Pérez-Reverte's story was recently republished in a re-compilation for the text Perros e hijos de perra (Alfaguara), and Murguía noticed the plagiarism at that time. Murguía would not proceed with a legal case but asked for an apology and the removal of the story from his text. Meanwhile, Pérez-Reverte apologized and noted that the story he published he wrote exactly as it was told to him by writer Sealtiel Alatriste.

Pérez-Reverte's script for the film Gitano in the late 1990s also brought another charge of plagiarism against him. In May 2011 the Audiencia Provincial of Madrid ordered Pérez-Reverte and Manuel Palacios, director and co-writer of Gitano, to pay 80,000 euros to filmmaker Antonio González-Vigil, who had sued them for alleged plagiarism of the film's script. Pérez-Reverte described this decision as "a clear ambush" and a "clear manoeuvre to extort money." The ruling contradicted two previous criminal rulings, and one from a merchant judiciary which had all decided in favor of Pérez-Reverte and Palacios. In July 2013 the Audiencia Provincial of Madrid ordered Pérez-Reverte to pay 200,000 euros to González-Vigil for plagiarism.

== Bibliography ==
=== Captain Alatriste novels ===
- El capitán Alatriste (1996; tr: Captain Alatriste, Plume 2005, ISBN 978-0452287112), presenting the character of a swordsman in the Spanish Golden Age.
- Limpieza de sangre (1997; tr: Purity of Blood), about the "purity of blood" demanded from Conversos.
- El sol de Breda (1998; tr: The Sun over Breda), about the war in the Spanish Netherlands – specifically, the Siege of Breda.
- El oro del rey (2000; tr: The King's Gold), about the Spanish treasure fleet.
- El caballero del jubón amarillo (2003; tr: The Cavalier in the Yellow Doublet). Alatriste clashes with king Philip IV of Spain.
- Corsarios de Levante (2006; tr. Pirates of the Levant). Alatriste fights Barbary pirates across the Mediterranean.
- El puente de los asesinos (2011; tr. "The Bridge of the Assassins"). Alatriste is involved in a conspiracy to kill the Doge of Venice.
- Misión en París (2025).

=== Falcó novels ===
- Falcó (2016). Lorenzo Falcó is an intelligence operative working for the Nationalists during the Spanish Civil War, who embarks on a mission whose outcome may turn the tide of the war.
- Eva (2017). A new mission takes Falcó to Tangier, where he must prevent the departure of the Moscow gold shipment.
- Sabotaje (2018). Falcó travels to Paris for a new mission involving painter Pablo Picasso.

=== Other novels ===
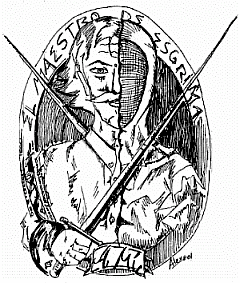
Jaime de Astarloa in The Fencing Master

- El húsar (1986). The story of a young hussars officer during the Peninsular War
- El maestro de esgrima (1988; tr: The Fencing Master, Mariner Books, 2004. ISBN 978-0156029834). A mysterious lady requests lessons from a fencing master.
- La tabla de Flandes (1990; tr: The Flanders Panel). The mystery surrounding the relationship between a serial killer and a mysterious medieval Flemish painting.
- El club Dumas or La sombra de Richelieu (1993; tr: The Club Dumas ISBN 978-0156032834). A cult of followers of the novels of Alexandre Dumas.
- La sombra del águila (1993). Set during the Napoleonic invasion of Russia.
- Territorio comanche (1994). A novelization of his experiences as a war reporter during the Yugoslav Wars.
- La piel del tambor (1995; tr: The Seville Communion). A thriller involving hackers, the Vatican and the lost treasure of a privateer.
- Un asunto de honor (1995). The story of an underaged prostitute.
- La carta esférica (2000; tr: The Nautical Chart). The story of a retired sailor who longs for the sea.
- La Reina del Sur (2002; tr: The Queen of the South ISBN 978-0452286542). The story of a Mexican woman who becomes the leader of a drug trafficking cartel in southern Spain.
- Cabo Trafalgar (2004), about the battle of Trafalgar.
- El pintor de batallas (2006; tr: The Painter of Battles). A retired war photographer confronts his past.
- Un día de cólera (2007). 2 May 1808. The battle in Madrid against the French army for independence, hour to hour.
- Ojos azules (2009). Spanish soldiers flee the Aztecs.
- El Asedio (2010; tr: The Siege by Frank Wynne). Set in 1811, during the siege of Cádiz.
- El tango de la guardia vieja (2012; tr: What We Become). Romantic novel set across the world during the first half of the Twentieth Century.
- El francotirador paciente (2013). A maverick graffiti artist constantly evades capture.
- Hombres buenos (2015). About the Royal Spanish Academy and the Encyclopédie
- Los perros duros no bailan (2018). Novel told from the point of view of a street dog.
- Sidi (2019). About the Castilian knight El Cid.
- Línea de fuego (2020). Nationalists and Republicans clash to capture a strategically important town in Catalonia during the Spanish Civil War.
- El italiano (2021). An Italian Navy diver on a sabotage mission washes ashore in southern Spain during World War II.
- Revolución (2022). A Spanish mining engineer is caught in the chaos brought by the start of the Mexican Revolution.
- El problema final (2023; tr: The Final Problem). A murder mystery in which a former Sherlock Holmes actor must solve a real life killing on a Mallorca islet.
- La isla de la mujer dormida (2024)
- Misión en París (2025; tr. Mission in Paris), Alatriste series n. 8
- Enviado especial (2026; tr. Special Correspondent)

=== Non-fiction ===
- Obra breve (1995)
- Patente de corso (1998). Collection of press columns.
- Con ánimo de ofender (2001). Another collection of columns.
- No me cogeréis vivo (2005)
- Cuando éramos honrados mercenarios (2009)
- Los barcos se pierden en tierra (2011)
- Perros e hijos de perra (2014)
- La guerra civil contada a los jóvenes (2015). Illustrated by Fernando Vicente.
- Una historia de España (2019)

=== Screenplays ===
- The Fencing Master (1992) (co-screenwriter with Antonio Larreta, Francisco Parra and Pedro Olea, based on his novel The Fencing Master)
- Comanche Territory (1997) (co-screenwriter with Slavador García-Ruiz and Alberto Lecchi, based on his novel on Comanche Territory)
- Gitano (2000) (story, co-screenwriter with Manuel Palacios)
- Gold (co-screenwriter with Agustín Díaz Yanes, based on his short story)

== Films and television series based on novels by Arturo Pérez-Reverte ==
- The Fencing Master (1992) (based on his novel The Fencing Master, also co-screenwriter)
- Uncovered (1994) (based on The Flanders Panel)
- Cachito (1995) (based on Un Asunto de Honor)
- Comanche Territory (1997) (based on Comanche Territory, also co-screenwriter)
- The Ninth Gate, by Roman Polanski (1999) (very loosely based on The Club Dumas)
- The Road to Santiago (1999), Spanish television miniseries (story)
- Alatriste (2006) (based on the series Captain Alatriste)
- The Nautical Chart (2007) (based on The Nautical Chart and starring Aitana Sánchez-Gijón)
- Quart: El Hombre de Roma (2007), Spanish television miniseries based on The Seville Communion
- La Reina Del Sur (2011), telenovela airing on Telemundo based on The Queen of the South
- Queen of the South (2016–2021), US TV Drama series based on The Queen of the South, an English language adaptation of the Telemundo telenovela
- The Man from Rome (2022), based on La piel del tambor.
- The Final Problem (2026), based on El problema final.

== See also ==
- Captain Alatriste (the books)
- Alatriste (the film)
- Café Gijón (Madrid)
