= The Sun over Breda =

1998 novel by Arturo Pérez-Reverte

- Author: Arturo Pérez-Reverte
- Original title: El sol de Breda
- Translator: Margaret Sayers Peden
- Language: Spanish
- Publisher: Alfaguara
- Publication date: 1998
- Publication place: Spain
- English publication date: 2007
- Pages: 254
- ISBN: 9788420483122

The Sun over Breda (Spanish: El sol de Breda) is a 1998 novel by the Spanish writer Arturo Pérez-Reverte. It is the third book in the Captain Alatriste series.

== Plot ==
The novel is set around the Siege of Breda during the Eighty Years' War. Diego Alatriste and his teenage ward Iñigo Balboa fight in the Spanish army to suppress the Calvinist uprising in the Low Countries and become involved in intrigues. Iñigo encounters the writer Pedro Calderón de la Barca and helps him rescue books from a burning library, and provides details that the painter Diego Velázquez uses in The Surrender of Breda.

== Reception ==
Publishers Weekly wrote that the book is as engaging as the previous entries in the series, with "fast, furious, and sanguinary" action. The critic wrote that Pérez-Reverte manages to describe "the universal madness and desperation of combat" and "the tedium and misery that is the common soldier's everyday fate and the zealotry with which Christians—Catholic and Protestant alike—once massacred each other".
