= The Man from Rome =

- Theatrical release poster
- Spanish: La piel del tambor
- Directed by: Sergio Dow
- Screenplay by: Carmen López; Sergio Dow
- Based on: The Seville Communion by Arturo Pérez-Reverte
- Produced by: Enrique Cerezo; Pierfrancesco Fiorenza
- Starring: Richard Armitage; Amaia Salamanca; Paul Guilfoyle; Paul Freeman; Rodolfo Sancho; Alicia Borrachero; Franco Nero
- Cinematography: Aitor Mantxola
- Edited by: Miguel Ángel Prieto; Pablo Blanco
- Music by: Roque Baños
- Production companies: Enrique Cerezo PC; Fundación Enic Producciones; Augusto Color SRL production; Piel del tambor AIE
- Distributed by: Flins y Pinículas (es)
- Release dates: 13 October 2022 (Seville); 21 October 2022 (Spain)
- Countries: Spain; Italy; Colombia
- Language: English

The Man from Rome (Spanish: La piel del tambor) is a 2022 thriller film directed by Sergio Dow. It stars Richard Armitage, Amaia Salamanca, Fionnula Flanagan, Franco Nero and Paul Guilfoyle. It is an adaptation of the novel The Seville Communion by Arturo Pérez Reverte.

== Plot ==
After a hacking attack on the Pope alerts him to two mysterious deaths in a church in Seville, the Vatican sends special agent Father Quart to investigate by orders of his superior, Spada. Ownership of the church is contested between Macarena Bruner, whose family owns the estate the church belongs to and her estranged banker husband Pencho Gavira, who wants to build a skyscraper in its place. As long as the Bruner estate holds a mass in honor of its founder, the church cannot be touched, whereas the diocese would become the richest in Spain if the church were to be sold.

Meanwhile, it turns out the planned skyscraper is a ruse to cover up a giant money laundering scheme that Pencho secretly runs through his bank. Thus, him not acquiring the church puts the entire scheme into jeopardy, leading him to blackmail the Bishop of Sevilla with a list of priests he suspects of child abuse. To avert scandal, the Bishop tries to push the Bruner family to sell the church and get the church’s crafty priest, Father Ferro, out of the picture.

As it turns out, Ferro is a former Vatican special agent named Bosch, who (with the help of Spada) had faked his own death and lived under the disguise of Ferro to cover up that the Vatican hid billions in secret deposits by the Mafia, the Nazis and other criminals. Now that the murders have drawn attention to the church, his cover is in danger and thus the discovery of the secret bank accounts could lead the Vatican into an even bigger scandal.

Pencho kidnaps Ferro and threatens to frame him for a third murder in the church unless ownership is transferred to him. However, Quart and his assistant are able to locate and free Ferro and Pencho is arrested. Afterwards, the church‘s head restorer, Gris Marsala, confessed to Quart that she is directly or indirectly responsible for each of the three deaths. Quart proclaims she enacted the will of God to protected the church and absolves her. Spada informs the Pope of the recovered secret bank accounts.

== Cast ==
- Richard Armitage as Father Quart
- Amaia Salamanca as Macarena Bruner
- Fionnula Flanagan as Cruz Bruner
- Franco Nero as the Pope
- Paul Guilfoyle as Monsignor Spada
- Rodolfo Sancho as Pencho Gavira
- Paul Freeman as Father Príamo Ferro
- Alicia Borrachero as Gris Marsala
- Féodor Atkine as Cardenal Iwaszkiewicz
- Will Keen
- Jorge Sanz
- Carlos Cuevas
- Unax Ugalde
- Víctor Mallarino

== Production ==
The Man from Rome is an adaptation of the Arturo Pérez Reverte's 1995 novel The Seville Communion, which had already spawned a 2007 television adaptation, Quart, starring Roberto Enríquez and Ana Álvarez.

A Spanish-Italian-Colombian co-production, the film is a Piel del tambor AIE (Enrique Cerezo PC), Fundación Enic Producciones and Augusto Color SRL production, with the participation of Amazon Prime Video and RTVE. Principal photography in Spain and Italy had already wrapped in February 2022. Shooting locations in Seville included the Plaza de San Francisco. Aitor Mantxola worked as a cinematographer whereas Pablo Blanco and Miguel Ángel Prieto took over film editing. Roque Baños composed the music.

== Release ==
The film had a pre-screening in Seville on 13 October 2022. Distributed by Flins y Pinículas, it was theatrically released in Spain on 21 October 2022.

== Reception ==
On the review aggregator website Rotten Tomatoes, 13% of 8 critics' reviews are positive, with an average rating of 3.6/10.

Manuel J. Lombardo of Diario de Sevilla rated the film 1 out of 5 stars, considering that the film is conceived as a "stiff, superficial and formulaic entertainment for sleepy audiences, a cinema of automatic manners, [with] cliché characters and [a] second-rate international cast".

Raquel Hernández Luján of HobbyConsolas rated the film with 75 points ("good"), deeming the film to be "very enjoyable and easier to digest than the novel it is based on".

Oti Rodríguez Marchante of ABC rated the film 3 out of 5 stars, praising the ability to fit all the novel's plots, subplots and characters into just an hour and a half of footage.

== Accolades ==
Year	Award	Category	Nominee(s)	Result	Ref.
2023	31st Actors and Actresses Union Awards	Best Film Actor in a Minor Role	Unax Ugalde	Nominated	

== See also ==
- List of Spanish films of 2022
