= Purity of Blood =

1997 novel by Arturo Pérez-Reverte

- Author: Arturo Pérez-Reverte
- Original title: Limpieza de sangre
- Translator: Margaret Sayers Peden
- Language: Spanish
- Publisher: Alfaguara
- Publication date: 1997
- Publication place: Spain
- English publication date: 2005
- Pages: 251
- ISBN: 9788420483597

Purity of Blood (Spanish: Limpieza de sangre) is a 1997 novel by the Spanish writer Arturo Pérez-Reverte. It is the second book in the Captain Alatriste series.

== Plot ==
In 1623, the former soldier Diego Alatriste is enlisted to resque a woman who is held at a corrupt convent against the will of her family. Intrigues ensue that have Alatriste's ward Iñigo captured by the Spanish Inquisition, prompting Alatriste to receive help from the poet Francisco de Quevedo.

== Reception ==
Publishers Weekly wrote that the book contains "seriously entertaining thrills" but is less engaging than the first entry in the series.
