= Falcó (novel) =

2016 novel by Arturo Pérez-Reverte

- Author: Arturo Pérez-Reverte
- Language: Spanish
- Publisher: Alfaguara
- Publication date: 2016
- Publication place: Spain
- Pages: 296
- ISBN: 9788420428949

Falcó is a 2016 spy novel by the Spanish writer Arturo Pérez-Reverte.

== Plot ==
Lorenzo Falcó is 37 years old and described as an "elegant thug". He has no ideology and is recruited as an intelligence operative for the Nationalist faction during the Spanish Civil War. He is sent on a mission to infiltrate the Republicans and rescue José Antonio Primo de Rivera from prison in Alicante.

== Series ==
Falcó is the first entry in a trilogy of spy novels set during the Spanish Civil War. It was followed by Eva (2017) and Sabotaje (2018).
