= Captain Alatriste (novel) =

1996 novel by Arturo Pérez-Reverte

- Original Spanish language edition El capitán Alatriste (1996)
- Author: Arturo Pérez-Reverte
- Original title: El capitán Alatriste
- Translator: Margaret Sayers Peden
- Language: Spanish
- Publisher: Alfaguara
- Publication date: 1996
- Publication place: Spain
- English publication date: 2005
- Pages: 237
- ISBN: 9788420483535

Captain Alatriste (Spanish: El capitán Alatriste) is a 1996 novel by the Spanish writer Arturo Pérez-Reverte. It is the first book in the Captain Alatriste series.

== Plot ==
Diego Alatriste is a former soldier turned contract killer in Madrid. It is the early 1620s and he takes in the fatherless boy Iñigo Balboa. When Alatriste is tasked by the president of the Spanish Inquisition to team up with an Italian and kill two Englishmen who have arrived in the city, he becomes entangled in international intrigues and has to balance between different factions.

== Reception ==
Kirkus Reviews described the book as a "pleasure of swash, buckle and atmosphere" with "tidy infomercials" about 17th-century Spain. Publishers Weekly called it "a winning swashbuckler" and "popular entertainment at its best", complimenting its pace and sense of time and place.
