= The Ninth Gate =

1999 film directed by Roman Polanski

- Theatrical release poster
- Directed by: Roman Polanski
- Screenplay by: John Brownjohn; Enrique Urbizu; Roman Polanski
- Based on: The Club Dumas by Arturo Pérez-Reverte
- Produced by: Roman Polanski
- Starring: Johnny Depp; Lena Olin; Frank Langella; James Russo; Jack Taylor; Emmanuelle Seigner
- Cinematography: Darius Khondji
- Edited by: Hervé de Luze
- Music by: Wojciech Kilar
- Production companies: Artisan Entertainment; RP Productions; Orly Films; TF1 Films Production; BAC Films; Canal+; Kino Vision; Origen Producciones Cinematograficas; Vía Digital
- Distributed by: BAC Films (France); Araba Films (through United International Pictures; Spain); Summit Entertainment (International)
- Release dates: 25 August 1999 (France); 27 August 1999 (Spain)
- Running time: 133 minutes
- Countries: France; Spain
- Language: English
- Budget: $38 million
- Box office: $58.4 million

The Ninth Gate is a 1999 mystery film directed, produced, and co-written by Roman Polanski. An international co-production between the United States, Portugal, France, and Spain, the film is loosely based upon Arturo Pérez-Reverte's 1993 novel The Club Dumas. The film stars Johnny Depp as a dealer of rare books who is tasked with authenticating a 17th-century book that, if used correctly, can summon the Devil.

The premiere showing was at San Sebastián, Spain, on 25 August 1999, a month before the 47th San Sebastian International Film Festival. Though critically and commercially unsuccessful in North America, where movie reviewers compared it unfavorably with Polanski's supernatural film Rosemary's Baby (1968), The Ninth Gate earned a worldwide gross of $58.4 million against a $38 million movie budget. It has since been described as a cult classic.

== Plot ==
Dean Corso, a New York City rare book dealer, is hired by wealthy collector Boris Balkan. Balkan has acquired a copy of a 17th-century book by Aristide Torchia, called The Nine Gates of the Kingdom of Shadows, a title alluding to the nine circles of hell mentioned in Dante's Inferno, and said to be able to summon the Devil. Torchia is alleged to have written the book in collaboration with the latter, and only three copies survived when both the author and his work were burned at the stake for heresy. Balkan believes only one of the three is authentic. He hires Corso to travel to Europe to inspect the other two copies to determine which one it is. During his travels, Corso is shadowed by a mysterious woman, whom he nicknames "Green Eyes."

Corso interviews Liana Telfer, the widow of Andrew Telfer who sold Balkan The Nine Gates shortly before killing himself. Telfer later seduces Corso, hoping he will sell the book to her. After they have sex, and he refuses to sell, she gets angry, and she knocks him unconscious. The next day, Corso goes to a bookseller to whom he had entrusted the book and finds him hanged in his store, in a way depicted in one of the engravings in The Nine Gates. Corso retrieves the book and travels to Toledo, Spain, to speak to the Ceniza Brothers, book restorers who owned Balkan's copy before the Telfers. The two show him that, of the book's nine engravings, only six are signed "AT," while the other three are signed "LCF" for Lucifer.

Corso travels to Sintra, Portugal, and meets with Victor Fargas, who owns a copy of The Nine Gates. Corso finds that three different engravings in his copy are signed "LCF," and the engravings signed this way have subtle differences from those signed "AT." Corso relays his findings to Balkan and Balkan orders him to acquire Fargas's copy. The next day, Green Eyes takes Corso to see Fargas, but they find that he has been drowned; Corso retrieves Fargas's burnt copy from the fireplace and finds that the three "LCF" engravings had been torn out. Corso goes to Paris, France, to investigate the third copy owned by Baroness Kessler. Wary of Corso and knowing he is employed by Balkan, she refuses him. Corso is attacked while walking outside only to be saved by Green Eyes, who exhibits seemingly supernatural powers. Corso hides Balkan's book in his hotel room and tells Kessler about the "LCF" engravings, proposing that each copy has three that together make an authentic set of nine. Intrigued, Kessler allows Corso to look at her copy. Corso is attacked while studying it in her library, the Baroness is strangled to death and the library set on fire. Corso returns to his hotel and discovers Balkan's copy is missing, probably stolen by Liana.

Green Eyes and Corso track Liana to her family's ancestral manor where a Satanic cult is conducting a rite using Balkan's book. Balkan interrupts the ceremony, takes his copy back, and strangles Liana to death as the rest of the members run away in fear. Corso abandons Green Eyes, presuming she was working for Balkan, and pursues Balkan but loses him when his car breaks down. Corso finds a clue in Kessler's belongings that directs him to a remote castle, where Balkan is preparing to summon the Devil using the nine "LCF" engravings. He subdues Corso and forces him to watch as he performs the rite; it seemingly grants Balkan immunity from harm, and he immolates himself to convince a still-skeptical Corso. However, Balkan begins to scream in pain as the flames engulf his body. Corso eventually frees himself, retrieves the engravings and shoots Balkan dead to end his suffering. Sitting in Balkan's car, Corso is startled by Green Eyes, and she kisses him. The pair then have passionate sex on the ground, while backlit by the burning castle. Green Eyes' face and eyes seem to change as she writhes astride Corso in a state of crazed bliss.

Afterwards, as the two are traveling, Green Eyes explains Balkan's rite failed because the ninth engraving was forged. When they stop for gasoline she vanishes, but leaves Corso a note sending him to the Ceniza brothers. At their shop, Corso finds they have vanished and the shop is being cleaned out. As workmen remove a large bookcase, a dust-covered paper floats down from the top. This is the authentic engraving, which depicts a woman who resembles Green Eyes riding atop a dragon-like beast in front of the castle at dawn. Corso, now with all nine authentic engravings in his possession, returns to the castle. The gates open on their own and emit a powerful bright light as Corso walks through, taking the journey through the Ninth Gate.

=== Engravings ===
The ten black and white engravings, consisting of an unnumbered title page and nine numbered pictures, using both Greek, Roman and Hebrew numerals, are reminiscent of tarot trumps and evocative of biblical symbolism:

Engraving	Symbol	Tarot reference	Religious reference
title page	ouroboros	ace of cups (Goldschmidt) ace of swords (Guildhall Library)	fall of man Leviathan
title page	tree	The Tower (Belgium, Viéville)	tree of life tree of knowledge
title page	lightning strike	The Tower (Belgium, Viéville)	—N/a
title page	m.dc.lx.vi.	—	number of the beast
title page	Sic Luceat Lux	—	Lucifer; Waldensian motto
ℵ. I. α.	knight, four turrets (AT version)	knight card: 1. knight of cups 2. knight of coins 3. knight of wands 4. knight of swords	four horsemen
ℶ. II. β.	elder, lamp	The Hermit	hermit, Diogenes
ℶ. II. β.	elder, keys	—N/a	keys of Peter
ℶ. II. β.	elder, keys, locked door	Ibn Umayl, as depicted in the Aurora consurgens	
ℶ. II. β.	teth	numerical value of nine, preceding the ninth engraving	
ℷ. III. γ.	arcan	minor arcana, major arcana	—
ℷ. III. γ.	traveler, cupid	The Fool, The Lovers	—
ℸ. IIII. δ.	buffoon	The Fool, The Joker	—
ℸ. IIII. δ.	3 dice totaling 6 points each	—N/a	number of the beast
ה. V. ε.	grim reaper	Death	—N/a
ה. V. ε.	moneybag	suit of coins	thirty pieces of silver
ו. VI. ς.	hanged man	The Hanged Man	Judas
ו. VI. ς.	flaming sword	ace of swords	—
ז. VII. ζ.	king	king card, The Emperor	—
ז. VII. ζ.	king and serf playing chess	king piece, pawn, chessmen	—
ז. VII. ζ.	dogs, moon	The Moon	—
ח. VIII. η.	spinning wheel	Wheel of Fortune	—
ח. VIII. η.	Balkan macing Corso	Strength (Visconti-Sforza rendition)	halo, aureola (LCF version)
ח. VIII. η.	vir.	Strength, Justice, Temperance	—N/a
ט. VIIII. θ.	nude woman	The Star	Whore of Babylon
ט. VIIII. θ.	hydra, dragon	The Devil	Beast of Revelation
ט. VIIII. θ.	fortress	The Tower	New Jerusalem
ט. VIIII. θ.	ten.br lvx	—N/a	Lucifer; Waldensian motto

== Cast ==
- Johnny Depp as Dean Corso
- Frank Langella as Boris Balkan
- Lena Olin as Liana Telfer
- Emmanuelle Seigner as Green Eyes (credited as "The Girl")
- Barbara Jefford as Baroness Frieda Kessler
- Jack Taylor as Victor Fargas
- James Russo as Bernie Ornstein
- José López Rodero as Pablo and Pedro Ceniza/First and Second Workmen
- Tony Amoni as Liana's Bodyguard
- Willy Holt as Andrew Telfer
- Allen Garfield as Witkin
- Jacques Dacqmine as Old Man
- Joe Sheridan as Old Man's Son
- Rebecca Pauly as Old Man's Daughter-In-Law
- Catherine Benguigui as The Concierge
- Maria Ducceschi as Secretary
- Jacques Collard as Gruber
- Dominique Pozzetto as Desk Clerk
- Emanuel Booz as Baker
- Lino Ribeiro de Sousa as Hotel Porter
- Asil Raïs as Cabby
- Bernard and Marinette Richier as Café Owners
- Jane Bradbury as Demon (uncredited)

== Production ==
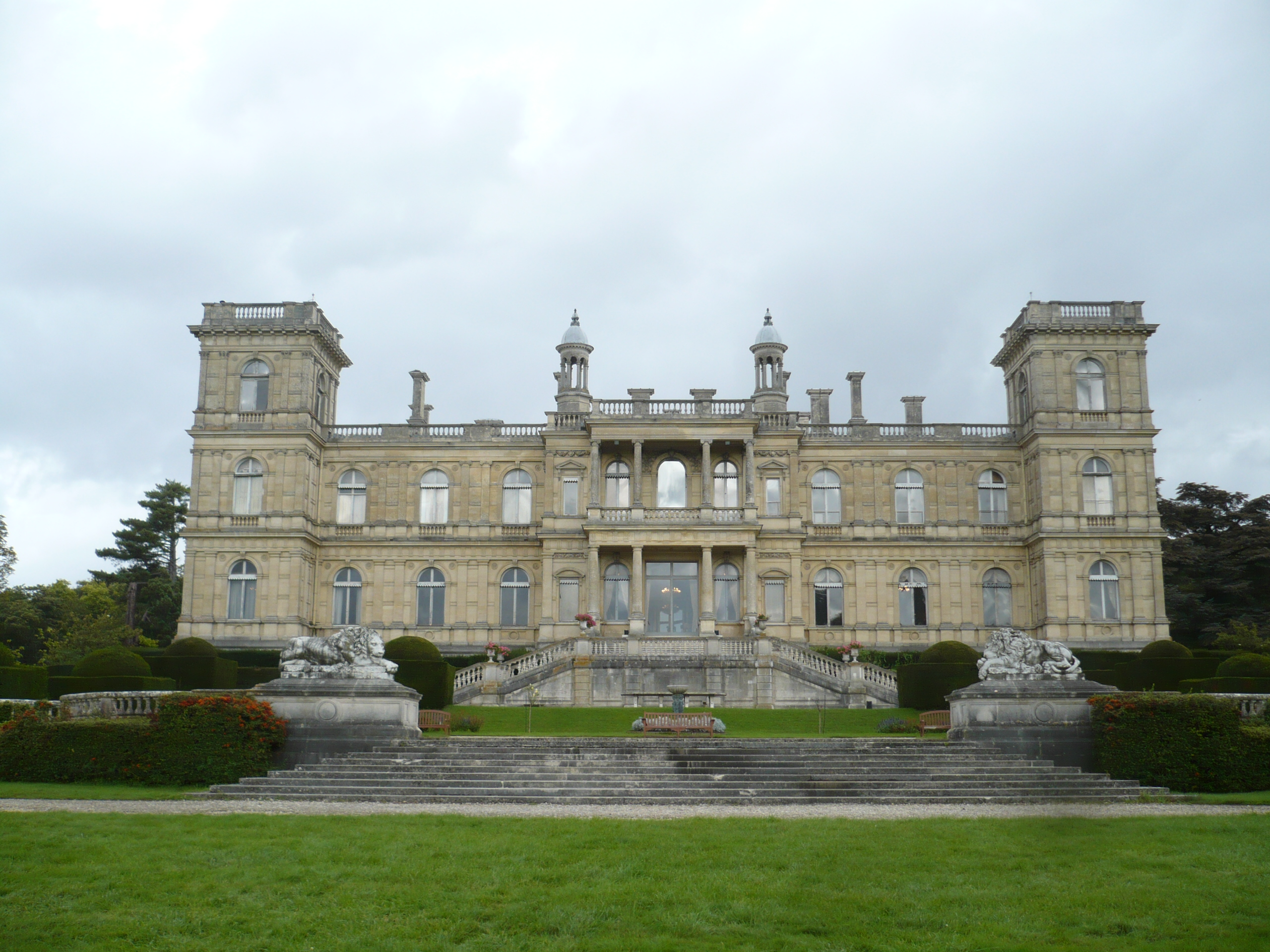
Château de Ferrières, Ferrières-en-Brie, Seine-et-Marne, France

Roman Polanski read the screenplay by Enrique Urbizu, an adaptation of the Spanish novel El Club Dumas (The Club Dumas, 1993), by Arturo Pérez-Reverte. Impressed with the script, Polanski read the novel, liking it because he "saw so many elements that seemed good for a movie. It was suspenseful, funny, and there were a great number of secondary characters that are tremendously cinematic". Pérez-Reverte's novel, El Club Dumas features intertwined plots, so Polanski wrote his own adaptation with his usual partner, John Brownjohn (Tess, Pirates and Bitter Moon). They deleted the novel's literary references and a sub-plot about Dean Corso's investigation of an original manuscript of a chapter of The Three Musketeers, and concentrated upon Corso's pursuing the authentic copy of The Nine Gates.

Polanski approached the subject skeptically, saying, "I don't believe in the occult. I don't believe. Period." Yet he enjoyed the genre. "There [are] a great number of clichés of this type in The Ninth Gate, which I tried to turn around a bit. You can make them appear serious on the surface, but you cannot help but laugh at them." The appeal of the film was that it featured "a mystery in which a book is the leading character" and its engravings "are also essential clues".

In reading El Club Dumas, Polanski pictured Johnny Depp as Dean Corso, who joined the production as early as 1997, when he met Polanski at the Cannes Film Festival, while promoting The Brave. Initially, he did not think Depp right as Corso, because the character was forty years old (Depp was only 34 at the time). He considered an older actor, but Depp persisted because he wanted to work with Polanski.

Around the time of the film's North American release, there were reports of creative friction between Depp and Polanski. Depp said, "It's the director's job to push, to provoke things out of an actor". Polanski said of Depp, "He decided to play it rather flat, which wasn't how I envisioned it; and I didn't tell him it wasn't how I saw it". Visually, in the neo-noir genre style, Corso's dishevelled grooming derives from Raymond Chandler's character Philip Marlowe.

Polanski cast Frank Langella as Boris Balkan based upon his performance as Clare Quilty in Lolita (1997). Barbara Jefford was a last-minute replacement for the German actress originally cast as the Baroness Frieda Kessler, who fell sick with pneumonia, and after a second actress proved unable to learn the character's dialogue; with only days' notice, Jefford learned her part, spoken with a German accent. Depp met his long-time partner Vanessa Paradis during the shooting.

=== Filming ===
The Ninth Gate was filmed in France, Portugal, and Spain in the summer of 1998. Selected prominent buildings in the film are:

- Biester Palace, Sintra, Portugal (as mansion of book collector Victor Fargas)
- Château de Ferrières, Seine-et-Marne, France (as mansion owned by Liana Telfer)
- Château de Puivert, Aude, France (as the fictional "La Tour du Diable"/Devil's Tower)
- Calle Buzones in Toledo, Spain (street with Ceniza Brothers' bookshop)

== Soundtrack ==
The Ninth Gate (Original Motion Picture Soundtrack)

Soundtrack album by Wojciech Kilar
- Released: 16 November 1999
- Recorded: March 1999
- Studios: "Smecky" Studios, Prague
- Genre: Soundtrack
- Length: 53:58
- Label: Silva Screen SSD 1103
- Producers: Reynold da Silva, Gwen Bethel

Professional ratings
Review scores
Source	Rating
AllMusic	3/5 stars
Filmtracks	4/5 stars

The musical score for The Ninth Gate was composed by Wojciech Kilar, who previously collaborated with Polanski on Death and the Maiden (1994). The film's main theme is loosely based upon Havanaise, for violin and orchestra, by Camille Saint-Saëns; some of the score has a vocalization (specifically, a melodic aria) by Korean soprano Sumi Jo. A soundtrack album was released on 16 November 1999 via Silva Screen label.

== Release and reception ==
=== Box office ===
The premiere screening of The Ninth Gate was in San Sebastián, Spain, on 25 August 1999; in North America, it appeared in 1,586 cinemas during the 10 March 2000 weekend, earning a gross income of $6.6 million, and $18.6 million in total. Worldwide, it earned $58.4 million against a $38 million production budget. On May 22, 2007, an extended version was released with a runtime of 2 hours and 13 minutes.

=== Critical response ===
On Rotten Tomatoes the film has an approval rating of 44% based on reviews from 97 critics. The consensus reads, "Even though the film is stylish and atmospheric, critics say The Ninth Gate meanders aimlessly and is often ludicrous. And despite the advertising, there's hardly any chills." On Metacritic it has a score of 44 out of 100 based on reviews from 30 critics, indicating "mixed or average reviews". Audiences surveyed by CinemaScore gave the film a grade "D−" on scale of A to F.

Roger Ebert said the ending was lackluster: "while at the end, I didn't yearn for spectacular special effects, I did wish for spectacular information — something awesome, not just a fade-to-white". In his review for The New York Times, Elvis Mitchell said the movie was "about as scary as a sock-puppet re-enactment of The Blair Witch Project, and not nearly as funny". Entertainment Weekly rated the film "D+", and Lisa Schwarzbaum said it had an "aroma of middle-brow, art-house Euro-rot, a whiff of decay and hauteur in a film not even a star as foxed, and foxy, as Johnny Depp, himself, could save". In the Los Angeles Times, Kenneth Turan said the film was "too laid-back, and unconcerned about the pacing of its story to be satisfying", because "while a thriller that's not high-powered, is an intriguing concept, in reality it can hold our attention for only so long". In the Village Voice, J. Hoberman said the film was "barely releasable hokum, stuffed with cheesy blah-blah". European reviews were generally more attentive and praised the film's pace and irony.

In Sight and Sound magazine, Phillip Strick said it was "not particularly liked at first outing — partly because Johnny Depp, in fake grey temples, personifies the odious Corso of the book a little too accurately — the film is intricately well-made, deserves a second chance, despite its disintegrations, and, in time, will undoubtedly acquire its own coven of heretical fans".

In Time magazine, Richard Corliss said that The Ninth Gate was Polanski's most accessible effort "since fleeing the U.S. soon after Chinatown".

In the San Francisco Chronicle, Bob Graham said that "Depp is the best reason to see Polanski's satanic thriller" and "Polanski's sly sense of film-noir conventions pokes fun at the genre, while, at the same time, honoring it".

After the release of The Ninth Gate, Artisan sued Polanski for taking more than $1 million from the budget, refunds of France's value-added tax that he did not give to the completion bond company guaranteeing Artisan Entertainment a completed film.
