= Línea de fuego =

2020 novel by Arturo Pérez-Reverte

- Author: Arturo Pérez-Reverte
- Language: Spanish
- Publisher: Alfaguara
- Publication date: October 2020
- Publication place: Spain
- Pages: 740
- ISBN: 9788420454665

Línea de fuego (transl. Firing Line) is a 2020 novel by the Spanish writer Arturo Pérez-Reverte. It is set during the Spanish Civil War and portrays people on both sides.

The book was awarded the Premio de la Crítica. The jury highlighted its technical achievement, praised it as an anti-war novel and compared it to the Iliad.
