= Siege of Breda (1624) =

Siege within the Eighty Years' War

- Part of the Eighty Years' War and Thirty Years' War
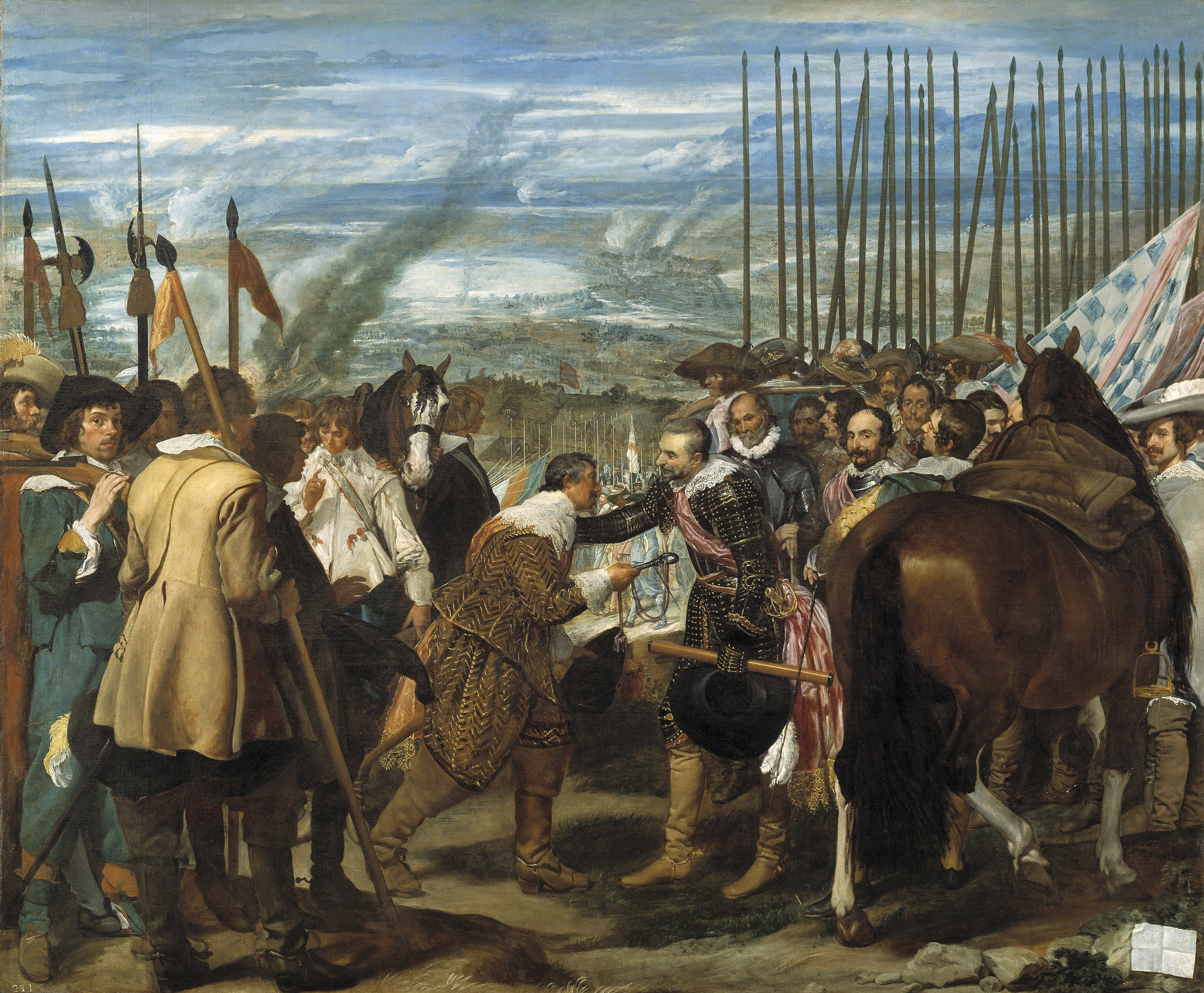
- The Surrender of Breda; Diego Velázquez, 1635.
| Date | 28 August 1624 – 5 June 1625 |
| Location | Breda (present-day the Netherlands) |
| Result | Spanish victory |

Belligerents
| Dutch Republic; England | Spanish Empire |

Commanders and leaders
| Maurice of Nassau; Justin of Nassau; Horace Vere; Ernst von Mansfeld | Ambrogio Spinola; Carlos Coloma |

Strength
| 7,000 (Dutch garrison); 7,000 (Dutch relief force); 7,000 (English relief force) | 18,000 |

Casualties and losses
| 10,000 dead, wounded or captured | 3,000 dead, wounded or captured |

The siege of Breda of 1624–1625 occurred during the Eighty Years' War and was carried out by the Army of Flanders. The siege resulted in the fortified city of Breda passing from the control of the Dutch Republic to that of the Habsburg Netherlands.

== Background ==
Breda was one of the most strongly fortified towns in the borderlands between the territory of the States of Holland and royal Brabant. The city was strategically located on a navigable river, the Mark, and near several roads.

Henry III of Nassau, Lord of Breda from 1509 to 1538 had travelled widely on behalf of Charles V. In Italy, he came into contact with the modern defences of the bastion fort. In 1531 he commissioned the construction of the walls of Breda in the latest style. These were later modernised and expanded further. In 1587 and 1622, the defences were further extended and updated.

The Breda fortress consisted of a very high earthen bulwark with 15 bastions. Its 55-to-117-metre-wide (180 to 384 ft) moat was five feet deep and was provided with water from Mark. Access to the town was made possible by four brick gates. Crescent ravelins were applied in the ditches. Hornwork was placed beyond the gates and at the monastery. Rows of stakes impeded assault by horsemen and foot soldiers and simultaneously prevented desertion. The fortifications were in excellent condition and served as a state of the art example of fortification.

There were several motives for Spinola's siege of Breda. Because the Dutch regularly used the town as a base for raiding Spanish Brabant, the parts of Brabant under royal rule would be better protected if the city were conquered. In addition, neighbouring towns occupied by the States, such as Bergen op Zoom, would be easier to conquer with a foothold in Breda.

In 1590, Breda was captured from the Spanish using the stratagem with the peat boat. The conquest of a well-defended city like Breda would erase this disgrace. More importantly, Spinola personally felt that the failure of the siege of Bergen-op-Zoom (1622) was a blot on his reputation.

Furthermore, Spain wanted to have a strong position in potential peace negotiations. The conquest of Breda would enable Spain to put forward stronger demands concerning religious freedom for Catholics in the Republic and lifting the blockade of the Scheldt.

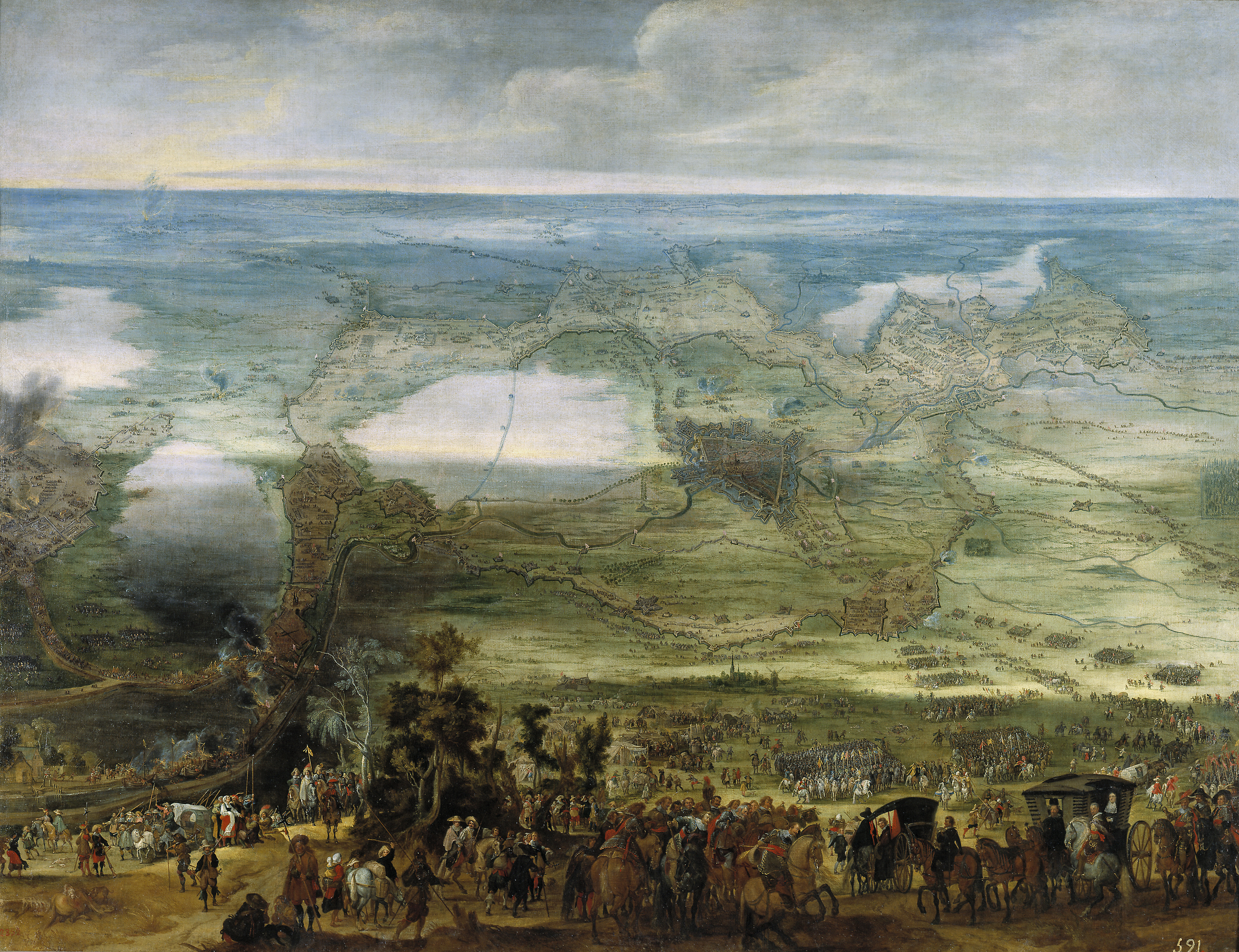
Painting of the siege of Breda

Around Breda, woods and marshes formed an obstacle for the cavalry and artillery of any besieging army and the high water table around the town posed challenges to attacking infantry. The rivers Mark and Aa and other streams also hampered besiegers. By opening an inundation sluice near the Ginnekense gate, the area south of Breda could be put underwater. The north side had a functioning lock near Terheijden.

Because the States of Holland and West Friesland knew that the Spanish army might attempt to conquer Breda, they provided the city with enough food, supplies, and weapons for an eight-month siege. The city council refused to store more food than was necessary for a nine-month siege. Nobody knew what tactics the Spanish army would apply. Therefore, the possibility of a direct assault was also considered. To prevent this, a Dutch army was stationed near Breda with the aim of disrupting any direct assault on the city.

=== Breda garrison ===
The garrison in Breda consisted of 17 companies in peacetime, each of which consisted of 65 men and 5 cavalry squadrons of 70 riders each. When it was probable that the city would become besieged, the squadrons were supplemented by another 30 riders each; the infantry was supplemented with 28 companies of 135 men. To save food, three squadrons were sent to Geertruidenberg shortly before a siege. The castle held approximately 100 civilians out of the 5,200 soldiers. The male inhabitants of Breda between 20 and 70 years, about 1,800 men, were armed to support the soldiers.

The governor of the city was Justin of Nassau, an illegitimate son of William I, Prince of Orange. His deputy was Dyrcx Cornelis van Oosterhout, but his role was insignificant during the siege.

In addition to the soldiers, others stayed in the city. Ordinary citizens, farmers, spouses and children of soldiers, came to the town to seek protection against the Spanish army. The soldiers' wives were responsible for cooking and washing for the soldiers and caring for the sick and wounded. The total number of inhabitants in the city is estimated at 13,111. They are believed to have been housed in about 1,200 homes.

=== Spanish Army ===
Conflicting and incomplete data does not allow for an accurate calculation of the size of the Spanish army. On 30 September the number was probably around 40,000 soldiers and on about 2 May 1625, approximately 80,000 soldiers. 25,000 were encamped along the supply corridor, another 25,000 men were used for the containment of the city, and 30,000 served as general reserves.

According to the text on the map by Blaeu, "[This was] so large an army, as had not been seen in the Netherlands in living memory."

| Percent | Nationality | Function |
|---|---|---|
| 38% | South Dutch | Infantry |
| 24% | German | Infantry |
| 10% | Italian | Infantry |
| 9% | Spanish | Riders |
| 9% | Spanish | Infantry |
| 5% | French | Infantry |
| 5% | English and Irish | Infantry |

The composition of the Spanish army was diverse, as shown in the table above. The army consisted primarily of infantry, with a small number of riders. Members of the infantry were equipped with either a rapier and a five-metre-long (16 ft) pike, or a rapier with a musket; members of the cavalry were equipped with either a lances and two pistols, or a musket and two pistols.

The infantry was mainly used for the lines to guard against a relief army and against sorties from the city. In the supply corridor, the foot soldiers deployed to protect the convoys. The cavalry was more mobile than the infantry and was therefore mainly used to inspect the area and to protect convoys.

The cannons could fire 10 shots per hour and were operated by gunners. The exact number of the Spanish guns is not precisely known, but there were certainly more than 30. Sappers engaged in building bridges, maintaining roads, and other activities.

The commander of the Spanish army was Ambrogio Spinola, 1st Marquis of the Balbases, a renowned military strategist from Italy. His deputies were the regimental commanders Hendrik, count van den Bergh, who was also commander of the supply corridor, and John VIII, Count of Nassau-Siegen. Spinola was the commander of the reserve forces until 31 October when he transferred them to the command of Carlos Coloma.

Because of the vastness of Breda, Spinola had his troops divided into four compartments. The four subjects with commanders were:

1. Ginneken in the south under the command of the Spaniard Francisco Medina
2. Teteringen in the east under the command of the Burgundian Claude de Rye, Baron of Balançon
3. Hage in the west under the command of the German Ernest, Count of Isenburg-Grenzau
4. Terheijden in the north, divided into two sectors: Hartel Bergen under the command of Paolo Baglione and Terheijden village under the command of Carlo Roma, both Italians.

== Siege ==
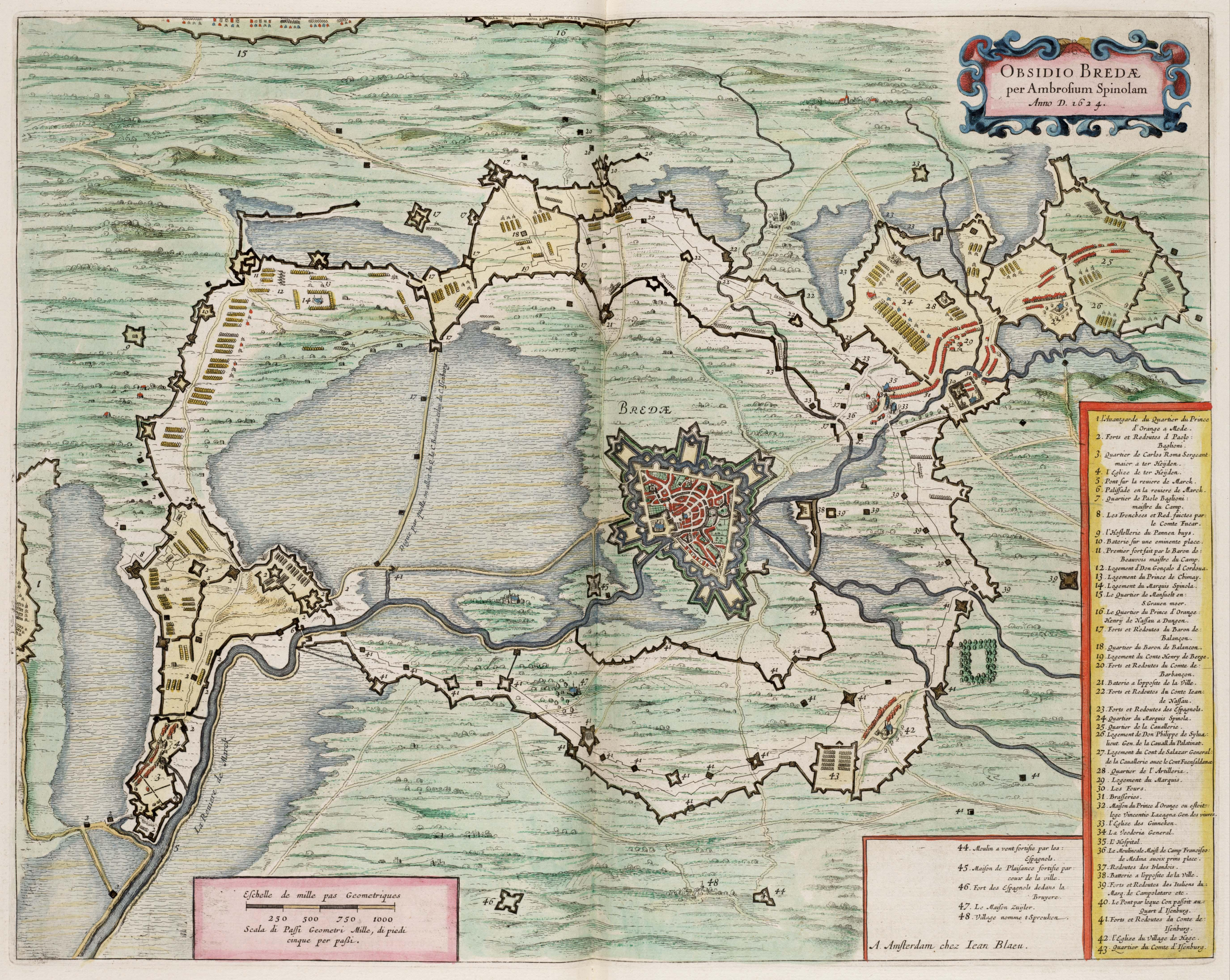
Map of the siege of Breda by Spinola. J.Blaeu.

Following the orders of Ambrogio Spinola, Philip IV's army laid siege to Breda in August 1624. The siege was contrary to the wishes of Philip IV's government because of the already excessive burdens of the concurrent Eighty and Thirty Years' wars. The strategically located city was heavily fortified and strongly defended by a large and well prepared garrison of 7,000 men, that the Dutch were confident would hold out long enough to wear down besiegers while awaiting a relief force to disrupt the siege. Yet despite the Spanish government's opposition to major sieges in the Low Countries and the obstacles confronting any attack on such a strongly fortified and defended city, Spinola launched his Breda campaign, rapidly blocking the city's defences and driving off a Dutch relief army under the leadership of Maurice of Nassau that had attempted to cut off the Spanish army's access to supplies.

In February 1625, a second relief force, consisting of 7,000 English troops under the leadership of Horace Vere and Ernst von Mansfeld, was also driven off by Spinola. After a costly nine-month siege, Justin of Nassau surrendered Breda on 2 June 1625. Only 3,500 Dutchmen and fewer than 600 Englishmen had survived the siege.

== Aftermath ==
The siege of Breda is considered Spinola's greatest success and one of Spain's last major victories in the Eighty Years' War. The siege was part of a plan to isolate the Republic from its hinterland, and co-ordinated with Olivares' naval war spearheaded by the Dunkirkers, to economically choke the Dutch Republic. Although political infighting hindered Spinola's freedom of movement, Spain's efforts in the Netherlands continued thereafter. The siege of 1624 captured the attention of European princes and, along with other battles, played a part in the Spanish army regaining the formidable reputation it had held throughout the previous century.

In the latter stages of the combined Eighty and Thirty Years' wars that had greatly strained Spanish resources, Breda was lost to the Dutch under Frederick Henry after a four-month siege. In the 1648 Treaty of Westphalia that ended the Thirty and Eighty Years' wars, it was ceded to the Dutch Republic.

=== In modern literature ===
The siege of 1624–1625 is the subject of the 1998 novel The Sun over Breda (El sol de Breda) by the Spanish author Arturo Pérez-Reverte, as part of the Captain Alatriste series. The events of the siege – including both the gruelling fighting with the Dutch and the infighting among the Spanish, including a major mutiny by unpaid Spanish troops – are depicted from the point of view of a boy serving with the Spanish forces. The realistic depiction of war and soldiers' daily life seems influenced by the writer's own long experience as a war correspondent.

The siege appears in the film Alatriste adapted from the novel series.

== See also ==
- Annus mirabilis (1625)
