= The Seville Communion =

1995 novel by Arturo Pérez-Reverte

- Author: Arturo Pérez-Reverte
- Original title: La piel del tambor
- Translator: Sonia Soto
- Language: Spanish
- Publisher: Alfaguara
- Publication date: 1995
- Publication place: Spain
- English publication date: 1 April 1998
- Pages: 589
- ISBN: 8420482013

The Seville Communion (Spanish: La piel del tambor, lit. 'The Drum Skin') is a 1995 thriller novel by the Spanish writer Arturo Pérez-Reverte. It follows a priest who is sent from the Vatican to Seville to investigate how a dilapidated church threatened by demolition may be connected to several mysterious deaths.

== Plot ==
Vatican City, 1995. A hacker breaks into the Pope's personal computer and warns him that a series of deaths is taking place at a small church in Seville. The priest Lorenzo Quart is therefore sent to Seville to investigate and determine what is happening and who the hacker is.

== Reception ==
The New York Times called the book "good fun, as entertaining as it often is silly".

== Adaptations ==
The novel was the basis for the 2007 television serial Quart, el hombre de Roma.

In 2022, the film The Man from Rome (La piel del tambor), also based on the novel, was released. It was directed by Sergio Dow and starred Richard Armitage, Amaia Salamanca, Alicia Borrachero, Rodolfo Sancho, and Paul Guilfoyle.
