= The Nautical Chart =

2000 novel by Arturo Pérez-Reverte

- Cover of a Spanish edition
- Author: Arturo Pérez-Reverte
- Original title: La carta esférica
- Translator: Margaret Sayers Peden
- Language: Spanish
- Genre: Novel
- Publisher: Alfaguara
- Publication date: 2000
- Publication place: Spain
- English publication date: 2001

The Nautical Chart (Spanish: La carta esférica) is a 2000 novel by Arturo Pérez-Reverte.

== Synopsis ==
Tánger Soto, a worker for the Naval Museum of Madrid, meets suspended sailor Manuel Coy and both embark upon the search of a lost ship, sunk by pirates in the 17th century.

== Publication ==
It was Pérez-Reverte's first novel to feature the sea, a lifelong passion of his, and he wrote it as a tribute to nautical fiction, including authors like Homer, Joseph Conrad, and Herman Melville. Written while he was also working on the Captain Alatriste series, he devoted three years to investigating and fourteen months to writing the book. Mainly set aboard a sailboat navigating the Mediterranean, it features cities like Madrid, Cádiz, and Cartagena.

The first edition, more than 500 pages long, was published by Alfaguara in 2000. Margaret Sayers Peden translated the novel into English, under the title The Nautical Chart, which was published by Harcourt. Picador also published the novel in English.

== Reception ==
Geraldine Bedell, in a review for The Observer, said that the "plotting isn't perfect" and that the translation into English "isn't always perfectly smooth", but that the novel is "playful and serious, a satisfying thriller that poses questions about what it takes to understand the past and chart the future, and the extent to which the stories we carry around with us show the way, or leave us at sea."

Steven Poole, writing for The Guardian, said that "[t]he reader is left on the sidelines, observing the characters groping towards a solution without ever really understanding the path that is followed." He added that there is "an infectious joy in storytelling" and that Pérez-Reverte writes literature "unembarrassed also to be entertainment".

Susana Rizo, in a review for Zenda, wrote that the novel is a "tribute" to a Mediterranean sea "full of history" and "where there are treasures yet to be found".

== Adaptation ==
A 2007 film adaptation, also entitled The Nautical Chart, was directed by Imanol Uribe, with Carmelo Gómez and Aitana Sánchez-Gijón in the starring roles.
