= Sidi (novel) =

2019 novel by Arturo Pérez-Reverte

- Author: Arturo Pérez-Reverte
- Language: Spanish
- Publisher: Alfaguara
- Publication date: 18 September 2019
- Publication place: Spain
- Pages: 376
- ISBN: 9788420435473

Sidi is a 2019 historical novel by the Spanish writer Arturo Pérez-Reverte. It is about Rodrigo Díaz de Vivar, later known as El Cid, during the beginning of his exile in 1081.

== Background ==
Arturo Pérez-Reverte says he got the idea for Sidi by watching John Ford's Cavalry Trilogy, which made him wonder how Ford would have depicted the medieval Spanish frontier. The book took one and a half year to write, with eight-hour work days.

== Plot ==
The novel follows the Castilian knight Rodrigo Díaz de Vivar during his exile in 1081, before he became known as El Cid.

== Themes ==
Pérez-Reverte took inspiration from Napoleon's maxims about leadership, Sun Tzu's The Art of War and Carl von Clausewitz' On War. He wanted Sidi to work as a manual for how to lead, convince and create an image, but also says the current period is "not the times for heroes". He wanted to use El Cid as an example of someone who knew how to die, which he says current-day Westerners have forgotten.

On depicting the time period's interections between Christians, Jews and Muslims, Pérez-Reverte makes a distinction between "true co-existence", which he considers foolish to believe in, and a "positive exchange, a common space", which did exist. One ambition with the book was to depict El Cid in a new way, without association to his depictions in Francoist Spain; this prompted the focus on El Cid's exile, and his intact loyalty to the king who exiled him.

== Publication ==
Alfaguara published the book on 18 September 2019. The first Spanish edition was printed in 145,000 copies. It was the best selling book in Spain in 2019.
