= Claude de Rye, Baron of Balançon =

Artillery officer in the Army of Flanders (1576 - 1648)

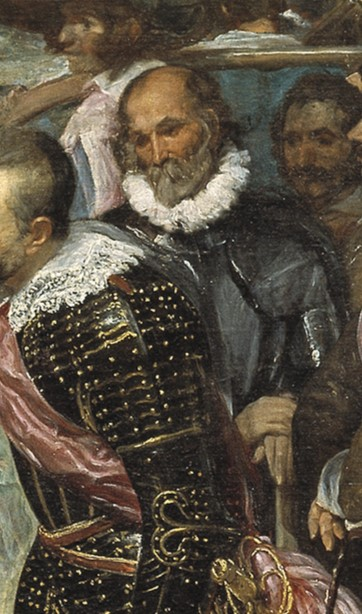
Claude de Rye at the headquarters of Breda, in the work "The Surrender of Breda" painted by Diego Velázquez between 1634 and 1635

Claude de Rye de la Palud, Baron of Balançon (c. 1576 – 24 March 1648) was a general officer of artillery in the Army of Flanders.

The second son of Philibert de Rye (1540–1597), count of Varax and of La Roche-Saint-Hippolyte, baron of Balançon and of Romange, lord of Vuillefans, by his marriage to Claudine de Tournon-Roussillon, lady of Vassoulieu, de Rye was probably born at Bouligneux, Bresse.

== Military career ==
Serving in a Burgundian regiment under the orders of his elder brother Christophe, he took part in the siege of Ostende (1601–1604) where he lost a leg on 26 July 1601. Thereafter he wore a wooden leg.

On 24 July 1602 his regiment was converted into a Tercio, and he succeeded his brother as "maestre de campo", thus becoming, although with interruptions, the commander of that unit for the next 23 years.

In 1620 he participated in the invasion of the Palatinate and on 14 November 1620 took part in the defence of Alzey, where his Burgundian Tercio managed to repel every enemy attack until it was relieved by Count Hendrik van den Berg. Balançon was also present at the Battle of Fleurus (29 August 1622), the siege of Bergen op Zoom, and the siege of Breda (1624–25), of which city he became governor until 1631.

In 1632 he was nominated General of Artillery in the Army of Flanders.

In 1635 Balançon ravaged the French regions of Artois and Picardy, commanding Croatian troops. In 1636, with 2,000 horse and 10,000 foot soldiers, he repelled a Dutch force sent to attempt Jülich and Kleve, thereafter relieving Schenck, besieged by the Dutch.

Balançon kept his position in the Army until 1638, when he became a member of the Brussels Council of War. In 1645 he was designated to the post of Governor of the County of Namur, living the last three years of his life in the castle of Namur, where he died in 1648.

== Marriage ==
On 20 August 1608 he married Claudine-Prospère (born 31 March 1588), daughter of Antoine de La Baume, Count of Montrevel.

== Bibliography ==
- "Memorial histórico español. Colección de documentos, opusgulos y antigüedades que publica la Real Academia de la Historia". Madrid: Imprenta Nacional, 1861
