= El húsar =

1986 novel by Arturo Pérez-Reverte

- Author: Arturo Pérez-Reverte
- Language: Spanish
- Publisher: Ediciones Akal
- Publication date: 1986
- Publication place: Spain
- Pages: 121
- ISBN: 8476001037

El húsar (lit. 'The Hussar') is a 1986 novel by the Spanish writer Arturo Pérez-Reverte. It is set during the Napoleonic Wars and follows Frederic Glüntz, a hussar who starts as an idealistic young recruit but becomes increasingly disillusioned by battle experience. The book was Pérez-Reverte's debut as a novelist.

Analyzing the book in 2007, Anne L. Walsh compared it to Pérez-Reverte's other war novels Territorio comanche (1994) and Cabo Trafalgar (2004), and wrote that they treat the past as fundamentally the same as the present. She wrote that Glüntz, at the end of El húsar, "has moved from the desire for mythical heroism to the disillusioned indifference of an old soldier, and within that indifference lies the true level of bravery in the face of inevitable defeat".
