= Uncovered (film) =

1994 film

- Theatrical release poster
- Directed by: Jim McBride
- Screenplay by: Arturo Pérez-Reverte (novel); Jim McBride; Michael Hirst; Jack Baran
- Based on: The Flanders Panel by Arturo Pérez-Reverte
- Produced by: Enrique Posner; Jack Baran
- Starring: Kate Beckinsale; John Wood; Sinéad Cusack; Paudge Behan; Art Malik
- Cinematography: Affonso Beato
- Edited by: Eva Gardos
- Music by: Philippe Sarde
- Production companies: Ciby UK; Barnholtz Entertainment
- Distributed by: Ciby 2000
- Release dates: May 1994 (France); 5 January 1995 (Germany)
- Running time: 112 minutes
- Country: United Kingdom
- Language: English

Uncovered is a 1994 British thriller film starring Kate Beckinsale. Beckinsale plays an art expert who faces danger after discovering a clue to a 500-year-old murder mystery in a Flemish painting. Directed by Jim McBride, the film is based on a novel by Arturo Pérez-Reverte called The Flanders Panel.

== Plot ==
Julia, an art restorer living in Barcelona, Spain, discovers a painted-over message on a 1471 Flemish masterpiece called La partida de ajedrez (The Chess Game) reading "Qvis Necavit Eqvitem", written in Latin (English: "Who killed the knight?").

With the help of her old friend and father-figure, the flamboyantly homosexual César, who lives at Casa Batlló, and Domenec, a local chess genius Julia found in Park Güell, Julia works to uncover the mystery of a 500-year-old murder. At the same time, however, Julia faces danger of her own, as several people helping her along her search are also murdered.

== Cast ==
- Kate Beckinsale as Julia
- John Wood as César
- Sinéad Cusack as Menchu
- Paudge Behan as Domenec
- Art Malik as Álvaro
- Helen McCrory as Lola
- Michael Gough as Don Manuel
- Peter Wingfield as Max
- Anthony Milner as Inspector
- James Villiers as Montegrifo

== Reception ==
Noting that the cast of Uncovered was "an amazing array of BBC regulars", the Reno Gazette-Journal argued that the film "plays in a very over-acted character", but called out Irish actor Paudge Behan as its "bright spot". Video Store Magazine called the film "a clever thriller that blends seemingly unfilmable subjects – art restoration, chess playing – into an intriguing whodunit", saying "Beckinsale is charming and lovely".
