= The Nautical Chart (film) =

2007 film by Imanol Uribe

- Promotional poster in Spanish
- Spanish: La carta esférica
- Directed by: Imanol Uribe
- Screenplay by: Imanol Uribe
- Based on: The Nautical Chart by Arturo Pérez-Reverte
- Produced by: Antonio Cardenal; Enrique Cerezo
- Starring: Carmelo Gómez; Aitana Sánchez-Gijón
- Cinematography: Javier Aguirresarobe
- Edited by: Teresa Font
- Music by: Bingen Mendizabal
- Release date: 31 August 2007
- Running time: 108 minutes
- Country: Spain
- Language: Spanish

The Nautical Chart (Spanish: La carta esférica) is a 2007 adventure film directed by Imanol Uribe. It is an adaptation of the novel The Nautical Chart by Arturo Pérez-Reverte.

== Premise ==
Coy, a suspended sailor, meets Tánger Soto, who gets hold of a cartographic treasure. They both embark upon the search of a lost ship, which carried a treasure and was sunk by pirates in the 17th century.

== Cast ==
- Carmelo Gómez as Coy
- Aitana Sánchez-Gijón as Tánger Soto
- Enrico Lo Verso as Palermo
- Javier García Gallego as pilot
- Gonzalo Cunill as Kiskoros
- Lucina Gil as Rocío Gamboa
- Carlos Kaniowsky as Perona

== Production ==
The screenplay was written by Imanol Uribe, adapting a novel by Arturo Pérez-Reverte, also entitled The Nautical Chart. The film was produced by Enrique Cerezo PC and Origenproducciones. Javier Aguirresarobe was the director of photography and Teresa Font worked as film editor. Bingen Mendizabal provided music.

== Release ==
Distributed by Universal Pictures International Spain, The Nautical Chart was released theatrically in Spain on 31 August 2007.

== Reception ==
Javier Ocaña, reviewing for El País, said that the film failed in many regards, including the use of voice-over. He praised Gómez's "excelent performance" and contrasted it with Sánchez-Gijón's work, saying she had never shown her "acting limitations" so clearly.

Federico Martín Bellón of ABC called the film a "sincere update" of the pirate film genre and regarded it as the "most complete and balanced" adaptation of one of Pérez-Reverte's novels.

Francisco Marinero of El Mundo wrote the production was "solid" and praised "planning, photography, art direction, settings, [and] music", but he also said that erotic scenes lacked sensuality.

Mirito Torreiro of Fotogramas rated the film 2 out of 5 stars, saying that the screenplay was a "shipwreck" and that nothing felt credible.

== Accolades ==
Year	Award	Category	Nominee(s)	Result	Ref.
2008	22nd Goya Awards	Best Adapted Screenplay	Imanol Uribe	Nominated	

== See also ==
- List of Spanish films of 2007
