= Antonio Larreta =

Uruguayan writer, critic and actor

- Born: Gualberto José Antonio Rodríguez-Larreta y Ferreira; December 14, 1922; Montevideo, Uruguay
- Died: August 19, 2015 (aged 92); Montevideo, Uruguay
- Occupations: writer, critic, actor
- Awards: Premio Bartolomé Hidalgo; Premio Planeta; Premio Casa de las Américas; Goya Awards; Iris Award; Premio Alas

Gualberto José Antonio Rodríguez-Larreta y Ferreira (14 December 1922 – 19 August 2015), better known as Antonio Larreta or Taco Larreta, was a Uruguayan writer, critic and actor.

Born in Montevideo, he attended Elbio Fernández School. During his career he was active in both Uruguay and Spain.

== Selected works ==
- 1976-1979: screenplay of Curro Jiménez (TVE1)
- 1980, Volavérunt (Planeta)
- 1986, Juan Palmieri (Librosur)
- 1988, The last portrait of the Duchess of Alba (Adler & Adler)
- 1988, Las maravillosas (Ediciones Trilce)
- 1999, A todo trapo. A propósito de Villanueva Saravia (Ediciones de la Plaza)
- 2002, El Guante (Planeta)
- 2002, El jardín de invierno
- 2004, Ningún Max (Planeta)
- 2005, El sombrero chino (Editorial Fin de Siglo)
- 2007, Hola, che (Editorial Fin de Siglo)

== Awards ==
- 1961: Premio Larra in Madrid for staging Lope de Vega's Porfiar hasta Morir
- 1971: Premio Casa de las Américas for his play Juan Palmieri
- 1980: Premio Planeta de Novela for his novel Volavérunt.
- 1992: Goya Award for Best Adapted Screenplay for The Fencing Master.
