= The Flanders Panel =

1990 novel by Arturo Pérez-Reverte

- First edition (Spanish)
- Author: Arturo Pérez-Reverte
- Original title: La tabla de Flandes
- Translator: Margaret Jull Costa
- Language: Spanish
- Genre: Crime novel
- Publisher: Alfaguara (First edition), Harcourt Brace & Company (First English edition)
- Publication date: 1990
- Publication place: Spain
- English publication date: 1994
- Media type: Print (Hardback)
- Pages: 418
- ISBN: 84-204-8079-7; ISBN 0-15-148926-2 (first English edition)

The Flanders Panel (original Spanish title La tabla de Flandes) is a novel written by Spanish author Arturo Pérez-Reverte in 1990, telling of a mystery hidden in an art masterpiece spanning from the 15th century to the present day.

== Plot summary ==
Julia, an art restorer and evaluator living in Madrid, discovers a painted-over message on a 1471 Flemish masterpiece called La partida de ajedrez (The Chess Game) which reads "Quis Necavit Equitem", written in Latin (English: "Who killed the knight?"). The painting appears as the cover of the book in some editions.

With the help of her old friend and father-figure, an antiques dealer named César, and Muñoz, a quiet local chess master, Julia works to uncover the mystery of a 500-year-old murder. At the same time, Julia faces danger of her own, as several people helping her along her search are also murdered.

== Film adaptation ==
The 1994 British film Uncovered, starring Kate Beckinsale and John Wood, is a cinematic adaptation of the novel.
