= Captain Alatriste =

Novel by Arturo Pérez-Reverte

Diego Alatriste y Tenorio
- Monument to Captain Alatriste in Cartagena, Spain
- Created by: Arturo Pérez-Reverte

In-universe information
- Nickname: Captain Alatriste
- Gender: Male
- Title: "Captain"
- Occupation: Soldier and swordsman
- Nationality: Spanish

Captain Alatriste (Spanish: El capitán Alatriste, fully titled Las aventuras del capitán Alatriste) is a series of novels by Spanish author Arturo Pérez-Reverte. It deals with the adventures of the title character, a Spanish soldier and man of fortune living in the 17th century.

== Series ==
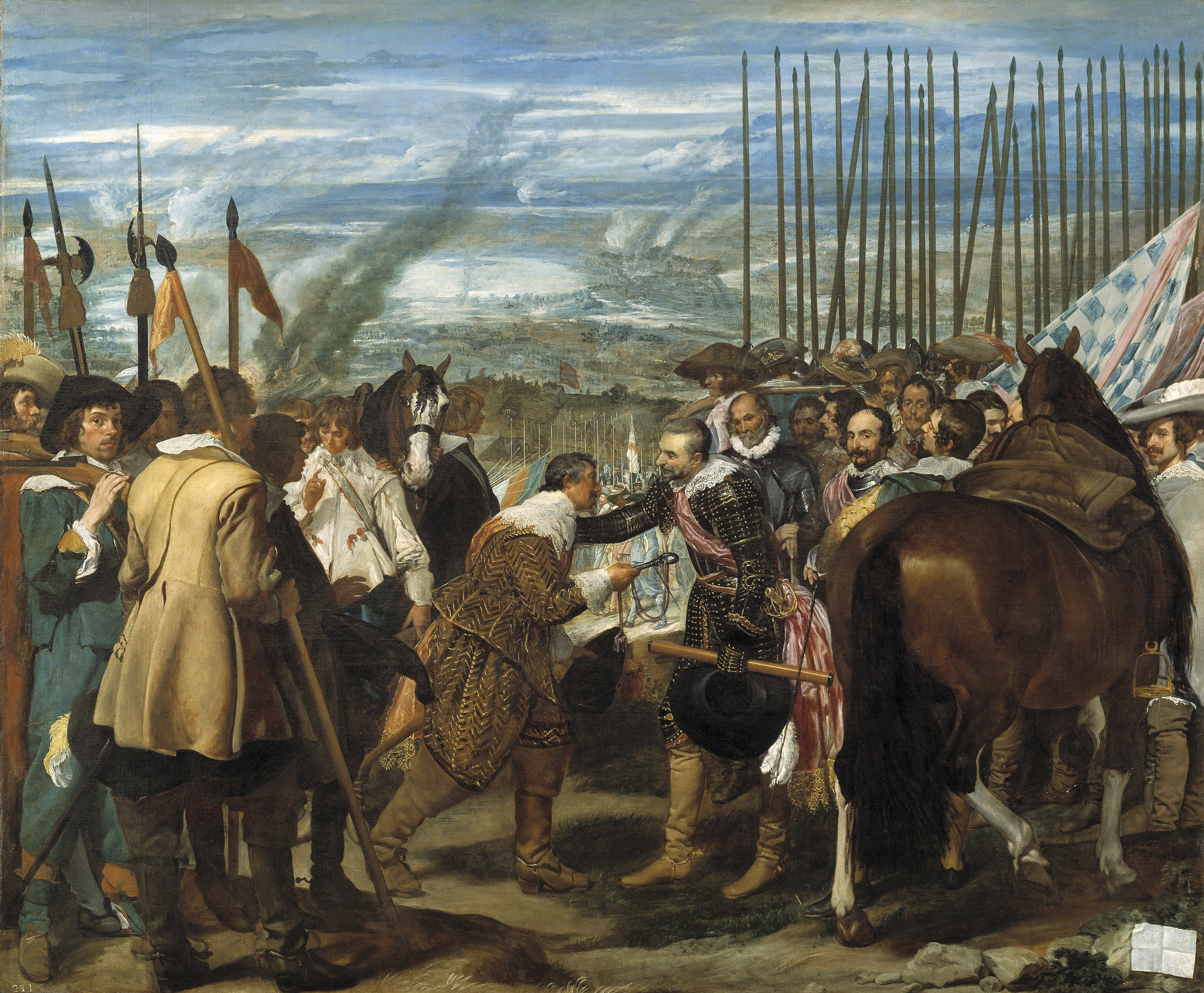
La rendición de Breda (1634–1635) was inspired by Velázquez's first visit to Italy, in which he accompanied Ambrosio Spinola, who had conquered the Dutch city of Breda a few years prior. This masterwork depicts a transfer of the key to the city from the Dutch to the Spanish army during the Siege of Breda. According to the third novel, Alatriste is in the group on the right, behind the horse.

1. El capitán Alatriste (Captain Alatriste, 1996): In 1623, Diego Alatriste and Italian sword-for-hire Gualterio Malatesta are paid by two mysterious masked characters to kill a pair of unknown English visitors in Madrid as news reaches the city that the Spanish siege of Bergen op Zoom has been repelled.
2. Limpieza de sangre (Purity of Blood, 1997): Madrid, 1623. A woman is found murdered in front of a church. Later, Quevedo seeks help from Alatriste to rescue a girl forced to enter a convent; meanwhile Alatriste's young squire Íñigo Balboa deepens his infatuation with the adolescent maidservant of the Queen, Angélica de Alquézar. Title refers to the "purity of blood" demanded of Conversos.
3. El sol de Breda (The Sun over Breda, 1998): Spanish Netherlands, 1624–1625. Alatriste and Íñigo join the Spanish Army and fight in the war against Dutch rebels, in particular the siege of Breda.
4. El oro del Rey (The King's Gold, 2000): Seville, 1626. After their participation in the Flanders War, Alatriste and Íñigo return to Spain, where they become involved in an affair involving a Spanish treasure fleet ship full of contraband gold newly arrived from the Indies.
5. El caballero del jubón amarillo (The Cavalier in the Yellow Doublet, 2003): Back in Madrid, Alatriste initiates a relationship with the famous actress María de Castro. However, he will encounter a rival for her affections amidst new intrigues at Court.
6. Corsarios de Levante (Pirates of the Levant, 2006): Alatriste and Íñigo go through different adventures along the Mediterranean coast, fighting Barbary pirates from Southern Spain to the Ottoman Empire.
7. El puente de los asesinos (The Bridge of the Assassins, 2011) Alatriste and Íñigo get mission to take part in an attempt of coup d'état in Venice to depose the Doge of Venice.
8. Misión en París (Mission in Paris, 2025): this adventure takes the reader to the heart of the French capital, during the tense conflict between Catholics and Huguenots. The story shows an older and darker Captain Alatriste.

As of December 2006, the book sleeve of Corsarios de Levante suggested that the novels El puente de los asesinos, La venganza de Alquézar and Misión en París were planned. As of October 2025, El puente de los asesinos and Misión en París are already published in Spanish.

== Adaptations ==
A movie based on the series, titled Alatriste, was released on September 1, 2006, directed by Agustín Díaz Yanes and starring Viggo Mortensen.

Pérez-Reverte was inspired to begin the series due to a lack of treatment in his teenage daughter Carlota's school textbook of the historical Spanish Golden Age. He commissioned Carlota to gather documentation for him (hence, she is billed as co-author of the first novel) and developed the stories. Pérez-Reverte is influenced by the works of many novelists, in particular 19th-century writers like Alexandre Dumas and his D'Artagnan Romances. He also applies the dark tone of his experiences as a war reporter.

The period settings allow him to insert references to authors (such as Lope de Vega and Miguel de Cervantes) and artists (including Diego Velázquez) who were widely read and appreciated at the time, one of the most important periods in Spanish history. He reflects on Spain and the Spaniards as a united people who, in spite of being at war with all the major European powers, are capable of showing bravery and honour.

In 2014, Telecinco produced the TV series Las aventuras del capitán Alatriste, directed by Enrique Urbizu and starring Aitor Luna.

== List of main characters ==
- Captain Diego Alatriste y Tenorio (1582–1643?), Leonese soldier since he was 13. Never an official captain, he earned the nickname when he had to briefly take command of his unit after their real captain was killed. He survives in peacetime as a sword for hire in Madrid. His death in the Battle of Rocroi against the French is mentioned in a flashforward of the narration in The King's Gold. His name comes from Sealtiel Alatriste, Pérez-Reverte's Mexican publisher and friend, and from the legendary Don Juan Tenorio, who is indeed Diego's grand-uncle, as stated in Purity of Blood.
- Íñigo Balboa y Aguirre (1610–?), the young Basque squire of Alatriste. He is the son of Lope Balboa, who was an old friend and comrade of Alatriste. Íñigo is the first person narrator of each of the books.
- Angélica de Alquézar (c.1611–c.1640), Aragonese lady in the queen's court, niece of Luis de Alquézar, inspired by Dumas' Milady de Winter. As a running joke or irony she constantly mispronounces the name Alatriste, calling the captain "Batriste", "el triste" (sad man), or other variations. Orphaned at an early age, she was adopted and educated by her uncle, Luis de Alquézar. After her presentation in the court, she became a companion-in-waiting to the queen. She has a stormy and passionate love-hate relationship with Íñigo Balboa, whom she meets in 1623. As vicious as she is beautiful, she is even shown trying to attack Alatriste in the second book (while she is only 12) with her bare hands; even the war veteran Alatriste is unnerved by this, but manages to evade her. Her relationship with Íñigo reaches its height towards 1630–1634, and he mentions in a flashforward that he eventually kills her when she makes an attempt on his life. A widely acclaimed beauty, she is portrayed by Diego Velázquez in 1635.
- Luis de Alquézar (c.1570–?), royal secretary of Aragonese origin. Studies law in Zaragoza, and begins his career as clerk of the royal audience in the Aragonese capital. Rising quickly in the administration, he joins the Council of Aragon in 1610. With the support of the Count-Duke of Olivares, he reaches the coveted post of royal secretary in 1623. That same year he meet Diego Alatriste, during the adventure of two Englishmen, in which the royal secretary is aligned with the extremist faction of the Inquisitor, Fray Emilio Bocanegra, against the more moderate Olivares. Since that time, he is a bitter enemy of Alatriste, whom he has tried to dispose of on several occasions through the swordsman Gualterio Malatesta.
- Francisco de Quevedo (1580–1645), famous, talented and ironic poet of the period, and friend of Alatriste.
- Gualterio Malatesta, an Italian sword fighter from Palermo. He becomes a nemesis to Diego Alatriste in the first book and remains so through the fourth book. He begins his career as mercenary swordsman in his hometown, which at the time is part of the Spanish Empire. He moves to Madrid, where after acting as a freelance assassin, he joins the service of Luis de Alquézar. Following an argument with Diego Alatriste during an assault on the two Englishmen, he becomes the sworn enemy of Alatriste. He is involved in the second, fourth, and fifth books. In 'El caballero del jubón amarillo', he is taken into custody for attempting to kill King Philip IV of Spain. In the seventh book 'El puente de los asesinos' he gets freedom in exchange for taking part in a secret mission in Venice along with Diego Alatriste, which leads to improving of their relationship, though duel occurred in final ends with a draw as they are forced to leave the place together.
- Emilio Bocanegra, Dominican friar and president of the Holy Tribunal of the Inquisition. Opposed to the policy of the Count-Duke of Olivares, especially regarding his relationship with the bankers of Portuguese Jewish extraction, he tries by every means to hinder their projects, tightening the stringency of inquisitorial persecution against heretics and Jews. Mortal enemy of Diego Alatriste, because the latter disobeys his instructions to assassinate the two Englishmen he hatches several plots against Alatriste.
- Álvaro Luis Gonzaga de la Marca y Álvarez of Sidonia (aka Alvaro de la Marca), second Count of Guadalmedina, Grandee of Spain. Warrior and poet, he participates in campaigns against the Berber pirates; in 1613–1615, about to die in the disaster of Querquenes (1614), he is saved by Diego Alatriste, with whom he subsequently maintains a close friendship, albeit conscious of the difference in their social standing. In court, he shines as a refined aristocrat, and is celebrated as a poet. He is a great admirer of Francisco de Quevedo, but more akin to Góngora, whose patron he becomes after the loss of their great protector, count Villamediana, murdered in 1622.
- Martín Saldaña, former soldier and comrade of Alatriste, now lieutenant of alguaciles ("Police" of the period) in Madrid.
- Lope Balboa (c.1575–1621), former Alatriste's comrade and father of Íñigo Balboa.
- María de Castro, a famous actress from Madrid.
- Caridad la Lebrijana, Alatriste's mistress and the owner of The Tavern of the Turk, Alatriste's main residence in Madrid. Born in Lebrija (in the province of Seville), she moved to the capital around 1608, where she worked as an actress for a half-dozen years. She became a prostitute (in a brothel on the Calle de las Huertas), after which (c. 1620) she bought with her savings The Tavern of the Turk, on the corner of Calle de Toledo and Calle de Arcabuz, about 350 m from the Plaza Mayor. The tavern was an eatery that also rented rooms, in one of which stayed Alatriste and Inigo Balboa during their sojourns in Madrid.
- Ambrosio Spínola (1569–1630), Genoese military under Spanish command and governor of Milan.
- Gurriato (?–1634): A Moor tribesman of Oran, he joined Alatriste and others in 'Corsarios de Levante' after being baptized 'Gurriato'. His original name was Aixa Ben Gurriat from the Beni Barrani tribe.
- Gaspar de Guzmán, Count-Duke of Olivares (1587–1645), was King Philip IV's chief minister and the most powerful man in Spain next to the king himself. By 1643, with disasters befalling Spain, the Count-Duke of Olivares was dismissed.
- King Philip IV of Spain (1605–1665) was intelligent, but lacked interest in the affairs of state, which were handled (until 1643) by the Count-Duke of Olivares. During his reign, Spain continued to decline politically and economically.
- Félix Lope de Vega y Carpio (1562–1635), famous Spanish writer.
- Diego Rodríguez de Silva y Velázquez (1599–1660), famous Spanish painter (not yet very established at the time of the first novels). Thanks to the presence of Velázquez at his court, Philip IV was probably one of the most frequently portrayed monarchs in history.
