= The Fencing Master =

1988 historical novel by Arturo Pérez-Reverte

The Fencing Master is a 1988 historical novel by Spanish writer Arturo Pérez-Reverte set in Madrid, Spain in 1868. Amid the political turmoil of the Glorious Revolution where conspiracy and intrigue are commonplace, fencing master Don Jaime Astarloa tries to live as he always has. Subsisting on meager funds gained through teaching fencing to the sons of the nobility, the anachronistic Don Jaime lives by one universal code: "to be honest, or at least honorable--anything, indeed, that has its roots in the word honor."

The Fencing Master is presented in the third person with the focus on the protagonist.

== Historical references ==
The historical context of the novel is similar to what actually occurred in the Glorious Revolution of Spain. Much of the speculation by characters in the novel revolve around General Juan Prim, who did indeed lead the revolution. The events, too, were taken from actual historical record. A concierge, at one point, mentions to Don Jaime that the navy has rebelled in Cadiz, which actually occurred when Admiral Juan Bautista Topete mutinied. Some characters speculated on Francisco Serrano, who eventually became regent. Some discussions in the book run contrary to historical fact, such as Carreño's guess that Baldomero Espartero would become regent. Although this did not occur, Espartero was a significant enough man that it would not be out of the question if he did assume the post.

Even much of the talk about Queen Isabella II had some basis in fact. Luis de Ayala and Minister Marfori are said to have had intimate relations with the Queen, which is wholly possible due to her alleged nymphomania.

== Plot summary ==
=== Prologue ===
A minister, later revealed to be Joaquin Vallespin Andreu, uncle of Luis de Ayala, meets with an apparently wealthy blackmailer. Shortly, money and an envelope full of "names and addresses" changes hands, and the scene ends with a reference to the historical time frame, 1866 during the reign of Queen Isabel.

=== Chapter 1: The Fencing Bout ===
Luis de Ayala is a friend of Don Jaime Astarloa, a fencing master, who fences with him every morning. One day after fencing, they talk over glasses of sherry from Andalusia.

The subsequent discussion reveals that Luis de Ayala has apparently resolved to abstain from politics despite invitations to resume his post. Luis de Ayala's weakness for love is revealed, as is his propensity for gambling. Later, Luis mentions a Holy Grail, which turns out to be the "Treatise on the Art of Fencing," that Don Jaime is working on. The depth of Don Jaime's passion for fencing is revealed by a description of the lengths to which he has gone in search of an "unstoppable thrust" that is impossible to parry, which he is not sure even exists.

Don Jaime spends his time teaching fencing to the sons of the nobility. Since firearms are becoming more prevalent over swords, the fencing master has only a few students left. He repeatedly praises the pupils in front of their parents, often making gross exaggerations about their talent in order to retain his clients. He is serious about teaching his students, reprimanding them when they treat fencing as a sport instead of a combat art. Tired, he takes a break and heads to the Café Progreso to meet with his discussion group.

The microcosm of Don Jaime's discussion group, which meets at the Café Progreso, serves as a foil to Don Jaime. Cárceles the liberal and Don Lucas the conservative quarrel perpetually over politics, which Don Jaime does not care about. Romero, a music teacher, is similar to Don Jaime in that they are both teachers, and both harbour memories of love. However, Don Jaime teaches only males while Romero teaches at a school for girls. Also, Romero lacks the courage to make his love known. Finally, Carreño shares none of Don Jaime's honor, flaunting wild political theories as fact in order to gain attention.

The first chapter ends with a fencing lesson in which Don Jaime tries to convince his students that swordplay is useful. Rejecting the claim that fencing is just a sport, and denouncing firearms as a weapon of "vile highwaymen," he muses about the ethics and mysticism of fencing. When faced with the claim that fencing masters will one day cease to exist, he laments that with them will die "all that is noble and honorable about [battle]."

=== Chapter 2: Compound Attack with Two Feints ===
Don Jaime receives a note to meet a certain Adela de Otero in her home. Upon his arrival, he finds that Adela is not what he expected. He is fascinated with her, paying attention to certain characteristics that he finds odd, such as short fingernails and a small scar near her mouth. She asks him to teach her a secret "two hundred Escudo" thrust, and he declines with finality, becoming angry when she offers additional money. Later, Adela visits Don Jaime in his own home. At first, he receives her with stiff politeness but she proves herself to be knowledgeable about fencing. After a verbal test, which she passes, Astarloa agrees to teach her the secret thrust.

At night, Don Jaime resumes his quest to find the unstoppable thrust. After working on paper, he eventually goes into the fencing gallery to test his theories. As the clock strikes three, Don Jaime begins to doubt the possibility of an unstoppable thrust, hearkening back to the words of his old master. This daydream takes him back to the beginning of his fencing career, in the army. He recalls killing a fellow soldier over a girl, as well as other duels he fought as he learned fencing. In the end of his reflections, he concludes that Adela has come into his life too late.

=== Chapter 3: Uncertain Time on a False Attack ===
Adela de Otero arrives at Don Jaime's home for her fencing lesson. She impresses him by requesting that their first bout be fenced without masks. During their bout, he makes a few comments about her excellent technique, though she soon becomes angry when she realizes that he is not fencing to win. After an aggressive barrage of attacks from Adela, Don Jaime disarms her. In their subsequent bouts, Don Jaime is forced to use all his skill to avoid being hit, and is forced to hit his opponent or receive a touch himself. This leads to a rising respect for his opponent, evidenced by his compliments after the bout and the extended exchange they share about his history. De Otero, on the other hand, refuses to divulge anything about her own past.

=== Chapter 4: The Short Lunge ===
Don Jaime is with his group of friends at Café Progreso. Don Lucas and Cárceles, monarchist and republican respectively, argue heatedly while Carreño and Romero step in occasionally. Cárceles blames Queen Isabella and her continual vacillation between liberal and conservative positions for the country's troubles, and warns the others that opposition to her rule is beginning to cross party lines. Don Jaime remains detached from the conversation, until commotion outside forces him to investigate. He returns with the information that several generals have been arrested and taken to a military prison.

Later, back in his home, Astarloa teaches Adela de Otero his secret thrust. She learns it quickly, astutely remarking about its simplicity. After asking whether the fencing master had taught it to anyone else, she inquires whether he has ever killed anyone with this thrust. He refuses to answer, silently recalling the image of a man he had killed when he was still a soldier.

During his next session with Luis de Ayala, he tells the marquis about Adela. De Ayala takes immediate interest, and seeks to arrange a meeting. Don Jaime glazes over this request, though he denies any interest other than a professional relationship between him and Adela. The conversation takes a turn into politics for a moment, but the focus quickly turns onto Don Jaime himself, when Don Jaime reveals his own personal values with an emphasis on honor.

After a few ordinary lessons, Don Jaime finds himself in intimate conversation with Adela. He lets the conversation continue until he feels that he is no longer thinking clearly, at which point he ends the talk and escorts Adela home. While they ride in the carriage together, Adela requests that he let her meet with Luis de Ayala. Reluctantly, he agrees. At the next lesson, the marquis meets with Adela and arranges to meet her, excluding Don Jaime. Soon after, Adela sends a letter thanking him for the lessons and dismissing him from his service.

Several evenings later, Don Jaime sees Adela with a mysterious stranger. They leave as soon as Adela sees him. That night, Don Jaime dreams of a doll missing its eyes. One morning, Luis de Ayala uncharacteristically refuses to fence Don Jaime, citing an unsteady hand. He tells Don Jaime that the fencing master is the only man he can trust, and gives him a sealed envelope for safekeeping.

=== Chapter 5: Glissade ===
General Prim has begun the revolution and the navy has rebelled. The political atmosphere is in turmoil, evidenced by the newfound vigor with which the group at Café Progreso argues. Don Jaime remains impassive, teaching fencing as usual. Even when there is a small riot outside, he chastises his students for being distracted, lecturing them once again on the importance of tradition.

One morning, Luis de Ayala is found dead in his home. When Don Jaime goes to visit for their daily fencing, he is brought in and interrogated. At the crime scene, he noticed with dismay the cause of death: a foil wound in the throat, characteristic of the secret thrust that he had taught Adela. He volunteers little information during the session, eventually suggesting that the police visit Adela de Otero. Campillo, the investigator, informs him that Adela has disappeared.

=== Chapter 6: An Attack on the Blade ===
Feeling betrayed that his own thrust would be put to murderous use, Don Jaime tries to analyze the crime. He concludes that de Ayala must have been killed for the papers that he had given earlier in a sealed envelope to Don Jaime. He goes home and begins reading the letters, finding nothing but lists of names and a strange reference to silver mines. Unable to deduce a motive for killing de Ayala, Don Jaime decides to obtain the help of someone well versed in Spanish politics. He finds Cárceles at Café Progreso and persuades him to help. While Cárceles is in the middle of a discovery, Campillo knocks on the door.

Informed that he must go with the police, Astarloa leaves Cárceles temporarily with the documents. He is taken to the morgue, where he is shown the mutilated body of what seems to be Adela de Otero. The corpse is wearing Adela's ring, and looks similar to Adela, leading Don Jaime to believe that it is the body of his former student.

=== Chapter 7: The Appel ===
Again, Don Jaime is interrogated, but volunteers little information. He learns that he is under surveillance, due to his having a link to two murders, and that Adela's maid, Lucia, has been dismissed. He leaves, resolving to avenge Adela. Don Jaime returns to his home to find that Cárceles is missing. He forces entry into Cárceles' home, only to find his friend strapped into his bed, tortured out of his mind with a mass of razor cuts. In the darkness, he is ambushed by two assassins. Armed with his cane-sword, he deals two stab wounds to one and breaks the nose of the other. The assassins escape the watchmen, leaving Don Jaime again to answer Campillo's questions.

Seeing that he has made a mistake in keeping information from the police, Don Jaime tells Campillo everything that he knows. While the policeman is disappointed in Don Jaime's naivety, he is impressed with his courage. Cárceles dies in the hospital from his wounds, and Don Jaime is allowed to go. Campillo warns him to keep his weapon close, since he is now the last link in the crimes.

=== Chapter 8: With Bare Blades ===
Though certain now that his life is in danger, Don Jaime decides not to flee the country. He sits by the door to his home with his gun and cane-sword, waiting for his inevitable assailant. After several false starts, someone finally arrives. It is Adela de Otero. He discovers the secret letter, which was dropped when he initially opened the envelope. The secret of a man named Cazorla Longo, who presumably engineered the murders, is revealed. Adela tries to no avail to get the letter, eventually attempting to seduce Don Jaime and then stab him with a hairpin. After the attempt fails, Adela de Otero picks up the cane sword and attacks.

Pursued into the gallery, Don Jaime searches futilely for a weapon. Eventually, he settles for a blunted practice foil. The ensuing duel leaves Don Jaime wounded in his side. Finally, Don Jaime employs a redoublement, cutting over Adela's arm for a lethal thrust through her eye into her brain. The end of the novel finds Don Jaime standing before his mirror, still searching for the perfect, unstoppable thrust.

== Film ==
The Fencing Master (1992) produced by Antonio Cardenal and Pedro Olea was based on Pérez-Reverte's original story.
