= Carlos Fuentes (disambiguation) =

Carlos Fuentes Macías (1928–2012) was a Mexican novelist and diplomat.

Carlos Fuentes may also refer to:

- Carlos Fuentes Lemus (1973–1999), Mexican writer, photographer, painter and director, and son of Fuentes Macías
- Carlos Fuentes Rabe (1887–1974), Chilean Army general
