= La strega in amore =

- Italian film poster
- Directed by: Damiano Damiani
- Screenplay by: Ugo Liberatore; Damiano Damiani
- Based on: Aura by Carlos Fuentes
- Produced by: Alfredo Bini
- Starring: Rosanna Schiaffino; Richard Johnson; Gian Maria Volonté; Sarah Ferrati; Margherita Guzzinati; Vittorio Venturoli; Ivan Rassimov; Elisabetta Wilding
- Cinematography: Leonida Barboni
- Edited by: Nino Baragli
- Music by: Luis Bacalov
- Production company: Arco Film
- Distributed by: CIDIF
- Release date: 11 September 1966 (Italy)
- Running time: 110 minutes
- Country: Italy
- Box office: ₤203 million

La strega in amore (also known as The Witch, The Witch in Love and Strange Obsession) is a 1966 Italian drama-horror film directed by Damiano Damiani. It is based on the novel Aura by Carlos Fuentes.

== Cast ==
- Richard Johnson: Sergio
- Rosanna Schiaffino: Aura
- Gian Maria Volonté: Fabrizio
- Sarah Ferrati: Consuelo
- Margherita Guzzinati: Lorna
- Ivan Rassimov: the librarian

== Release ==
La strega in amore was released on September 11, 1966 in Italy where it was distributed by Cidif. The film grossed a total of 203,396,000 Italian lira domestically. It was released in the United States in August 1969 where it was distributed by G.G. Productions.
