= Cambio de Piel =

Cambio de Piel may refer to:

== Music ==
- Cambio de Piel (Alejandra Guzmán album), 1996
- Cambio de Piel (Bebe album), 2015
- Cambio de Piel (Denise Rosenthal album) or the title song, 2017
- Cambio de Piel, an album Myriam Montemayor Cruz, 2008
- "Cambio de Piel" (song), by Marc Anthony, 2013

== Other uses ==
- Cambio de piel (novel), or A Change of Skin, a 1967 novel by Carlos Fuentes
- Cambio de piel (TV series), a 1997 Venezuelan telenovela
