= Terra Nostra (novel) =

1975 novel by Carlos Fuentes

- First edition (Mexico)
- Author: Carlos Fuentes
- Translator: Margaret Sayers Peden
- Language: Spanish
- Publisher: Editorial Joaquín Mortiz
- Publication date: 1975
- Publication place: Mexico
- English publication date: 1976
- Pages: 783

Terra Nostra is a 1975 novel by the Mexican writer Carlos Fuentes. The narrative covers 20 centuries of European and American culture, and prominently features the construction of El Escorial by Philip II. The title is Latin for "Our earth". The novel received the Xavier Villaurrutia Award in 1976 and the Rómulo Gallegos Prize in 1977.

== Plot ==
Terra Nostra is divided into three parts, "The Old World", "The New World" and "The Next World" (the title of "The Next World" was changed from the Spanish version of the title, "The Other World," on Fuentes's suggestion to the translator). Most of the novel takes place in and around the unfinished El Escorial in the 16th century. Its main character is King Felipe II, his family and court, his friends the peasant girl Celestina and the student Ludovico, and three mysteriously identical youths, each with twelve toes and a red cross on their back. The main characters are reborn in different ages.

The novel opens in Paris on 14th July 1999 and ends in the same city five and a half months later on the eve of destruction. The middle part of the novel is a young Pilgrim's tale of his journey through the New World.

== Style and structure ==
Terra Nostra, perhaps Fuentes' most ambitious novel, is a "massive, Byzantine work" that tells the story of all Hispanic civilization. Modeled on James Joyce's Finnegans Wake, Terra Nostra shifts unpredictably between the sixteenth century and the twentieth, seeking the roots of contemporary Latin American society in the struggle between the conquistadors and indigenous Americans. Like The Death of Artemio Cruz, the novel also draws heavily on cinematic techniques.

Terra Nostra is a work in the modernist literary tradition. It has been called a "metafictional" as well as a "metahistorical" novel, and some critics have argued that it is a postmodern novel. It has also been called a reinvention of baroque literature.

The novel's structure parallels the architecture of El Escorial in many ways. Fuentes himself referred to the parallels in an interview published in 1978; "Terra Nostra is this: it is a second nature. In many senses: in the sense that the verbal literary construction is very similar to the material of the narrated construction of El Escorial...". Hieronymus Bosch triptych painting The Garden of Earthly Delights that appears in the novel is another parallel to the structure and themes of the three-part novel.

Terra Nostra is closely related to Fuentes essay Cervantes or the Critique of Reading. Intertextuality is prominent throughout the novel.

== Publication ==
The novel was published in 1975 through Editorial Joaquín Mortiz in Mexico and Seix Barral in Spain. An English translation by Margaret Sayers Peden was published in 1976 through Farrar, Straus and Giroux.

== Reception ==
Robert Coover reviewed the book for The New York Times, and wrote: "Carlos Fuentes is a world-famous author, serious, provocative, controversial even, inventive, widely considered Mexico's most important living novelist, maybe the greatest ever--but the world is full of doubters and perhaps Fuentes wished to silence them once and for all, burying them under the sheer weight and mastery of his book. More likely, though, it is the familiar case of a committed and conscientious writer being overtaken and captured by his own metaphor." Coover had reservations about how Fuentes seems to condemn the ascetic lifestyle that is to isolate oneself from the outside world in order to strive for perfection, while Terra Nostra in his view appears to be a work born out of exactly such a commitment. Besides the reservations, Coover wrote that "if Terra Nostra is a failure, it is a magnificent failure. Its conception is truly grand, its perceptions often unique, its energy compelling and the inventiveness and audacity of some of its narrative maneuvers absolutely breathtaking."

The novel won the Xavier Villaurrutia Award in 1976. In 1977, it was awarded the Venezuelan Rómulo Gallegos Prize by a jury which included Gabriel García Márquez.

== See also ==
- 1975 in literature
- Mexican literature
