= Inez (novel) =

2001 novel by Carlos Fuentes

- First edition cover
- Author: Carlos Fuentes
- Original title: Instinto de Inez
- Translator: Margaret Sayers Peden
- Language: Spanish
- Publisher: Alfaguara
- Publication date: 2001
- Publication place: Mexico City
- English publication date: 2002
- ISBN: 9505116950

Inez (original Spanish title: Instinto de Inez) is a 2001 novel by the Mexican writer Carlos Fuentes, later translated into English by Margaret Sayers Peden.

== Background ==
The novel alludes to literary and mythological figures including Faust and Don Juan. Fuentes also cited as influences Igor Stravinsky and Hector Berlioz, whose operatic adaptation of Faust, The Damnation of Faust, appears prominently in the book.

== Plot ==
Maestro Gabriel Atlan-Ferrara, on the eve of his possibly last performance, reflects upon his relationship with Inez Prada. Though the maestro and the diva had only met thrice in their relationship of nearly three decades, the intensity never fades. Their relationship is characterized by mutual admiration, a sense of independence and ego. Parallel to this, a fable of primeval human male and female union (re-union) is also portrayed, and the two streams blend into one at the climax, which is on the border of realism and fantasy. The maestro's favorite work is Berlioz's La damnation de Faust, which often comes up in the text as a backdrop as well as a metaphor.

== See also ==
- 2001 in literature
- Mexican literature
