= Terra Nostra =

Terra Nostra means "Our earth" and "Our land" in Latin, Italian and Catalan. It may also refer to:

- Terra Nostra (novel), a 1975 novel by Carlos Fuentes
- Terra Nostra (TV series), a 1999 Brazilian telenovela
