= Joaquín Mortiz =

Mexican publishing house

Joaquín Mortiz was a Mexican publishing house founded by Joaquín Díez-Canedo in 1962. The name comes from the contraction of the pseudonym Joaquín M. Ortiz, which Díez-Canedo used to write to his family in Spain under the Franco regime. In this way, he avoided drawing attention to himself with the surname of his father, Enrique Díez-Canedo, who was a staunch supporter of the Second Spanish Republic.

Joaquín Mortiz quickly became one of the most important publishers in the country. It mainly published Mexican literature, but also works by authors from other countries. More than 80% of the books published were literature, including works by renowned authors.

In 1967, it published Carlos Fuentes's novel Cambio de piel, which won Spain's Premio Biblioteca Breve in 1967. The book had been banned by censorship in Spain, where it was not published until 1974.

Joaquín Mortiz is currently an imprint of Grupo Planeta following a 1983 merger. Its catalogue includes authors such as Jaime Sabines, Jorge Ibargüengoitia, Juan José Arreola, Rosario Castellanos and Agustín Yáñez.
