= The Old Gringo =

1985 novel by Carlos Fuentes

- First edition (FCE)
- Author: Carlos Fuentes
- Original title: Gringo viejo
- Translator: Margaret Sayers Peden
- Language: Spanish
- Publisher: Fondo de Cultura Económica
- Publication date: 1985
- Publication place: Mexico City
- English publication date: 1986

The Old Gringo (original Spanish title: Gringo viejo) is a novel by Carlos Fuentes, first published in 1985. Its English language translation of the following year, by Margaret Sayers Peden, was the first novel by a Mexican author to be a U.S. bestseller and was one of three nominees for the Ritz Paris Hemingway Award as best novel of 1985. An unsuccessful adaptation to film followed in 1989. Later criticism has found in the novel a wary consideration of the irreconcilability of United States and Mexican mindsets.

== Plot ==
The novel is framed as the reminiscence of a female character (identified as Harriet Winslow through its course) "now she sits alone and remembers".

An embittered American writer and former journalist, not named until the final chapter as Ambrose Bierce, decides to leave his old life behind and seek death in the midst of the Mexican Revolution. A widower whose two sons are dead and whose daughter refuses to speak to him, he seeks out part of the Army of the North under Pancho Villa. The particular group he encounters in Chihuahua, led by 'General' Tomás Arroyo, has just liberated the massive hacienda of the Miranda family. Arroyo is mestizo, the product of the rape of his mother by his Miranda father, and is persuaded by the old gringo to let him join the revolutionary force.

At that same hacienda, the old man meets Harriet Winslow, a 31-year-old woman from Washington D.C., hired as a blind to tutor the Miranda children, while the family has fled the country. Harriet, however, refuses to leave the hacienda, insisting that she has been paid and will wait for the family's return. At first, she will not call Arroyo "General" (insisting that he has merely given himself the title), and has a patronizing view of the revolutionary army and the Mexican people. Her own father had disappeared during the earlier American invasion of Cuba and the Winslow family has been living off his army pension. Only Harriet knew that he had really stayed behind to live with a mulatto woman.

Harriet is committed into the care of the old gringo, who subsequently falls in love with her. The gringo displays considerable courage under fire, risking what seems like obvious death, and gains a reputation for valor. However, his refusal to obey Arroyo's order to shoot a captured Federal officer means that the 'General' could have him executed. Instead Arroyo shoots the officer himself, then parlays Harriet into a sexual relationship in return for sparing the gringo. Although Harriet appreciates their encounter, she cannot forgive his sexual arrogance. Arroyo's partner, a woman referred to as "La Luna", whom the Revolution has liberated from an abusive landowning husband, accepts his infidelity as necessary. But the gringo finds Harriet's sacrifice ironic, forcing him to reveal to her his real purpose in coming to Mexico. Instead, he now treats Harriet as a daughter in place of his estranged child, while she takes the old gringo in place of the father who has abandoned his family.

While Arroyo was away fighting in the mountains, Harriet had been attempting to rebuild and restore the hacienda and teach the women and children there. He, however, wishes to destroy his place of birth, remembering his humiliation there as the unrecognized son of the owner, and wins over the local peasants by posing as a true son of the people and using the name of his mother (Arroyo) rather than Miranda, to which he has a right. That right he believes contained in a document which he keeps close to him (though he cannot read it), until the gringo sets it on fire in revenge for his treatment of Harriet. Arroyo then responds by fatally shooting him in the back.

Later, Harriet presses for the return of the gringo's body, claiming him as her father, so that he may be buried in the grave reserved for the vanished Winslow at Arlington National Cemetery. Pancho Villa now faces criticism for an alleged cold-blooded murder of an American by troops under his overall command. Villa has the American's body exhumed and 'executed' by firing squad (passing it off as the work of the Federales). When Arroyo approaches to give the dead body the coup de grâce, Villa orders the firing squad to shoot Arroyo as a means of preventing any further American response.

After Harriet crosses the border back to the US, she refuses to testify in front of Congress as part of a journalistic campaign to encourage the U.S. to 'civilize' Mexico, and decides that instead of attempting to change Mexico, as she had wanted to earlier, the better approach, as she now tells the waiting journalists, is "to learn to live with Mexico".

== The novel ==
According to a 1992 interview, the initial idea for a novel on this theme came after Fuentes encountered the work of Ambrose Bierce in his teens, and was one to which he occasionally returned over the decades. Following publication, he commented that "What started this novel was my admiration for [Bierce] and for his Tales of Soldiers and Civilians. I was fascinated with the idea of a man who fought in the United States Civil War and dies in a Mexican civil war." The novel was written originally in Spanish and Fuentes then worked closely with Margaret Sayers Peden on the English translation. Between the two versions there are some differences in wording and even in the number of chapters.

Reviewers of the novel had difficulty with the postmodern rhetoric employed by Fuentes. The Los Angeles Times found it "not always easy to follow; perhaps his convulsive involvement with his native land prohibits that". This is echoed by a comment in one encyclopedia that Fuentes' experiments in narrative are meant as a demonstration of the novel's master theme: the almost unbridgeable distance between the Hispanic and Anglo-American cultures. Another critic sees in the novel "a negotiation of borders within and between selves and between and within countries", of which the mirrored ballroom that is all that remains of the Miranda hacienda is made the deceptive symbol. Publishers Weekly summed it up by finding that, "in this fine short novel, Fuentes remains, as usual, wisely suspicious of both American politics and those of the Revolution".

One key incident, however, is not of the novelist's invention. The murder, exhumation and posthumous execution of Bierce is based on the actual killing of the Englishman William Benton by one of Pancho Villa's generals in 1914. In reality, no one really knows what became of Bierce, thus allowing Fuentes to make of his fate an existential parable of personal choice and redemption.

== Translations ==
- Spanish Braille: Gringo viejo (1985)
- English translation: The Old Gringo (1985)
- Danish: Den gamle gringo (1985)
- French: Le vieux gringo (1986)
- German: Der alte Gringo (1986)
- Swedish: Den gamle gringon (1986)
- Italian: Il gringo vecchio (1986)
- English Braille: The Old Gringo (1987)
- Greek: Ho gero-gkrinnko (1987)
- Portuguese: Portugal: O velho gringo (1987), Brasil: Gringo Velho (1988)
- Dutch: De oude gringo (1988)
- Finnish: Vanha gringo (1989)
- Chinese: 奧拉; 異鄉老人 / Aola; Yi xiang lao ren (1991)
- Polish: Stary gringo (1992)
- Japanese: 老いぼれグリンゴ / Oibore guringo (1994)
- Romanian: Bătrânul gringo (1998)
- Persian: Grīngu-yi pīr (1378 [1999])
- Korean: 내가사랑한그링고 / Nae ka saranghan Gŭringgo (2001)
- Turkish: Koca gringo (2004)
- Croatian: Stari gringo (2005)
- Czech: Starý gringo (2005)
- Sinhalese: Grango mahallā (2007)
- Russian: Старый гринго / Staryĭ gringo (2010)

== See also ==
- 1985 in literature
- Mexican literature
