= Christopher Unborn =

1987 novel by Carlos Fuentes

- First edition
- Author: Carlos Fuentes
- Original title: Cristóbal Nonato
- Translator: Alfred MacAdam
- Language: Spanish
- Publisher: Fondo de Cultura Económica
- Publication date: 1987
- Publication place: Mexico City
- English publication date: 1989
- Media type: Print (Paperback)

Christopher Unborn (original Spanish title: Cristóbal Nonato) is the tenth novel by the Mexican author Carlos Fuentes. Originally published by the Fondo de Cultura Económica in 1987, the first U.S. edition, translated by Alfred MacAdam, was published in 1989 by Farrar, Straus & Giroux.

The basic structure of the work, including the story of the character from conception to birth, comes directly from the eighteenth-century novel The Life and Opinions of Tristram Shandy, Gentleman by Laurence Sterne (1759–1767), to which Fuentes refers openly in the novel.

The social satire story is set in Mexico in 1992, which was still a few years into the future when it was written. It follows the character Christopher's entire life in a cataclysmic Mexico on the brink of economic collapse. Other characters in the novel are Angel Palomar y Fagoaga, Angeles Palomar y Fagoaga, Don Homero Fagoaga, Don Fernando Benitez, Lady Mamadoc, Concha Toro, Matamoros Moreno, D. C. Buckley, and Will Gingerich.

Fuentes depicts a dark future for Mexico. It is a story about disaster and survival. The lead character Christopher Palomar, a wonder boy with excellent language skills and total recall, is the narrator who travels through this pessimistic future, where the people still struggle since the last big earthquake in 1985. The novel has a chapter for each of the nine described months of the story, spread out over Christopher's whole life, as he follows in his parents' steps, as they try to save themselves in a chaotic country entering into twilight.
