= Aura (novel) =

1962 novel

- Cover of the first edition (Mexico)
- Author: Carlos Fuentes
- Translator: Lysander Kemp
- Language: Spanish
- Genre: Magic realism
- Set in: Mexico City, 1961
- Published: 1962
- Publisher: Ediciones Era (Alacena)
- Publication place: Mexico City
- English publication date: 1965
- Pages: 62
- ISBN: 978-0-374-51171-5

Aura is a short novel written by Mexican novelist Carlos Fuentes, first published in 1962 in Mexico City. This novel is considered as magic realism literary fiction for its remarkable description of "dreamlike" themes and the complexion of "double identity" portrayed by the character. Its narrative is completely carried out in second person. The first English translation, by Lysander Kemp, was published in 1965 by Farrar, Straus and Giroux. It was adapted to the screen in 1966 in La strega in amore, starring Richard Johnson, Rosanna Schiaffino and Gian Maria Volonté.

== Plot ==
Felipe Montero is a young historian looking at the newspaper one day when he sees a job posting that catches his eye. The poster is looking for a French-speaker, youthful, passionate about history, and able to perform secretarial duties, who would be a live-in assistant to help organize and finish the memoirs of her deceased husband, General Llorente. This strikes Montero because he feels as though the posting is describing everything about him, and only lacks his name. For a few days, Montero ignores the posting, assuming someone will have already taken the job, but every day Montero returns to the newspaper, eventually unable to avoid it anymore. The posting gives the address "Donceles 815", a street mixed with old and new houses, side by side.

Upon arriving at the address, Montero finds the house to be completely dark, with the door ajar, as if the owner were waiting for him to arrive. Montero then enters the dark house, and hears a voice in the darkness calling to him. The voice guides him through the dark house, upstairs, to a room where an old widow, Consuelo, is lying in her bed. The old widow appears to be expecting Montero, and immediately begins to explain what she needs Montero to do: organize, finish, and publish her dead husband's journals before her death. While she is explaining this task to Montero, the widow's niece, Aura, enters the room. Montero is mesmerized by the young niece's beauty ‒ especially her bright green eyes. Shortly after, the widow directs Montero to the room where he will be living. Montero passes the night in his room, where only a small amount of light is provided.

The next morning, Montero wakes up to find Aura in the kitchen preparing breakfast, while the old widow remains in her room in bed. Aura and Montero have breakfast together, though Montero finds the breakfast awkward and long because the young niece barely speaks. Afterwards, Montero heads to the office to begin his work constructing the memories and journals of General Llorente. As he reads the General's writings, he makes some discoveries about Consuelo's infertility, her fantasy of having a child, and her obsession with youth. While working, Montero cannot seem to get the beautiful image of Aura out of his head, and soon begins fantasizing about her. These fantasies eventually begin to grow stronger, and often take over many of Montero's thoughts. Then, over the next few days, Montero realizes a strange connection between the old widow and Aura: often, whenever Consuelo is speaking, Aura's lips will move as well, and motions that Consuelo makes are also made by Aura at the same time. Montero is intrigued by Aura's beauty, and one day enters her room to find her in bed. Montero holds Aura in bed, when suddenly the youthful Aura transforms into the old widow, Consuelo, in his arms, as he himself transforms into the old General Llorente.

Throughout the story, Felipe Montero and Aura project the youth of life, and mirror the younger lives of General Llorente and Consuelo. For this reason, Felipe is able to connect so much with the General through his writings, and Aura mirrors the actions and movements of the old widow. The entire story depicts the eventual progression of Felipe Montero's transformation into the General, as well as Aura's transformation into Consuelo.

== Publication ==
Carlos Abascal, the Mexican Secretary of Labor, spoke out against the novel in 2001 after it was read in his teenage daughter's convent school in Mexico City, leading to the firing of the teacher and a surge in sales of the novel. This short novel was then banned in 2009 from the curricula of the Commonwealth of Puerto Rico's Department of Education, due to the alleged use of lewd language.

== See also ==
- 1962 in literature
- Mexican literature
