= Portrait in Sepia =

Novel by Isabel Allende

- First edition
- Author: Isabel Allende
- Original title: Retrato en Sepia
- Translator: Margaret Sayers Peden
- Language: Spanish
- Publisher: HarperCollins
- Publication date: 2000
- Publication place: United States
- Media type: Print (hardcover)
- OCLC: 457154398
- Preceded by: Daughter of Fortune

Portrait in Sepia (Spanish: Retrato en Sepia) is a 2000 novel by Isabel Allende. The novel can be thought of a sequel to Allende's Daughter of Fortune as it follows Eliza Sommers' granddaughter - Aurora del Valle.

== Plot summary ==
Portrait in Sepia is the sequel to Daughter of Fortune and follows the story of Aurora del Valle, the granddaughter of Eliza Sommers (Hija de la fortuna). The daughter of Lynn Sommers (the daughter of Eliza and Tao Chi'en) and Matías Rodríguez de Santa Cruz (son of Paulina del Valle and Feliciano Rodríguez de Santa Cruz) has no memory of the first five years of her life. She has recurring nightmares of men in black pyjamas looming around her and losing the grip on the hand of someone beloved.

Lynn died giving birth to Aurora, known also by her Chinese name Lai Ming, in Chinatown, San Francisco, while Aurora's biological father never acknowledged that he had a child until the end of his life; he died a slow and agonizing death of syphilis. After Lynn's death, Aurora's maternal grandparents raised her until the death of Tao Chi'en. After these events, Eliza approaches Paulina to raise Aurora while Eliza goes to China to bury Tao's body. Paulina makes Eliza agree to cut all contact with Aurora so that she will not become too attached to the girl only to have her taken away later on in life. So, Paulina del Valle tries to hide Aurora's true origins. Nevertheless, when Aurora talks to her real father, Matías, he tells the truth about her past. In this first part, the writer also describes the War of the Pacific in which Severo del Valle is involved as a soldier. The description of the war is very cruel; this can be seen in the scene where Severo del Valle loses his leg to gangrene.

The second part is about the transition of Aurora's childhood into adulthood. She learns to be a photographer and becomes an expert artist in the field of photography. The family moves from San Francisco to Chile and Frederick Williams becomes Paulina's husband, so that he will be accepted in Chilean society. Everyone there sees him as a true English lord, but no one knows that his origins are not noble. Allende also describes a civil war which affects them directly, as well as the way in which Paulina del Valle endlessly creates new businesses such as growing French wine and selling cheese, in Chile. The Del Valle family then travels to Europe because Paulina has a tumor and needs an operation. The operation is successful and Paulina becomes healthy and strong once more. She is more than 70 years old, but does not show signs of being tired, ill or soft; she imposes her will on her body and thus continues to rule the family as a matriarch.

Thus, the novel is divided into three parts plus an epilogue. The first part describes Aurora's infancy and family members, and in the second part, Aurora's life comes more into play. The third part is where Aurora grows up, becoming a photographer, marrying Diego Domínguez and eventually leaving him. She takes a lover, Dr. Ivan Radovic, and their relationship is explained more fully in the epilogue.

In the end, the mystery of Tao Chi'en's death is revealed and it plays an important role.

== Characters ==
Aurora del Valle
The protagonist of the novel. The book describes the key moments in her life from her infancy up to her marriage and separation in adult life. She is the granddaughter of Eliza Sommers and Tao Chi'en from Daughter of Fortune.

Paulina del Valle
Aurora's paternal grandmother and the wife of Feliciano Rodriguez de la Cruz, Paulina originally appeared in Daughter of Fortune as a supporting character. A strong-willed woman, even her husband could not control her and she has always done whatever she wanted. Her sharp business sense has allowed her to amass an incredible fortune in areas such as wine and cheese. She adopts Aurora at the request of Eliza Sommers, who leaves the United States for China after Tao Chi'en dies. Paulina raises her granddaughter as a princess; Aurora does not even have to go to school; she has preceptors and she does not have to work to live, in part because Del Valle family is very rich. Paulina likes to impress everyone around her, spending money and having a luxurious house in Chile. She is a feminist and helps poor women through foundations.

Frederick Williams
Paulina's second husband, Frederick comes from England and is described by Aurora as a typical Englishman. He helps the family in many ways, demonstrating a quiet but intelligent character. He and Tao Chi'en offer a great deal of contrast when compared to other characters such as Matías del Valle. Frederick Williams is shown as the personification of calmness.

Tao Chi'en
Aurora's maternal grandfather. He is a very wise man who, according to Eliza Sommers, "...acts like God, a friend and a father" for Aurora. He is very important in Aurora's infancy, to such a degree that she forgets that her first five years of life could have to do with Tao Chi'en's sudden death.

Matías Rodriguez de Santa Cruz y del Valle
Aurora's biological father. He abandoned her mother, Lynn Sommers, and never loved her, having only used her as part of a bet. Thus, Matías never acts as Aurora's father. Although he told his mother that he was dying from arthritis, he actually died of syphilis due to his hedonistic way of life. Just before his death he admits to Aurora that he is her real father.

Severo del Valle
Cousin of Matías, he marries Aurora's mother and becomes Aurora's step-father. It is only when she is a teenager that Aurora discovers the truth about her past, when Matías tells her what Paulina had always attempted to hide. He also appears in The House of the Spirits as Clara's father.

== Major themes ==
Major themes are historical descriptions of two wars and the role of a woman in Chile. The novel has many feminist reflections; thoughts that Isabel Allende herself has accepted, she shares. Paulina del Valle is seen as the ultimate feminist, a woman who rules in a world of men. She helps poor women using her wealth through charitable organizations. No one would ever try to pass on her and everyone obeys her, even her two husbands. She is very conservative and rules the family with gloves of steel, as a matriarch. Her force is a big contrast to Frederick Williams' calm and peace of mind.

War and history are important in this novel; Allende has confided she always does thorough historical research for her novels for accuracy. Also, she describes the ultra-conservative characteristics of Chilean society at that time.

The other important theme is love, although it is only seen in the third part of the novel. Allende seems to describe love in a non-romantic manner.
