= Gabacho =

Spanish pejorative used in Spain for the French and in Mexico for the Americans

In the Spanish language, the word gabacho (F gabacha) describes foreigners of different national origins in the history of Spain. The word gabacho originated in Peninsular Spain as a derogatory term for French people and things, and in contemporary usage the term retains the initial meaning. However, in other Hispanophone countries, the word gabacho acquired a meaning similar to the word guiri (a slur for light featured foreign tourists, especially those from northwest Europe) in Spain.

In some Hispanophone countries of Latin America, the word gabacho is akin to gringo and refers to people and things from the United States. When the definite article el is used, as in the phrase "el gabacho" it refers to the country. In Mexico, Guatemala, and El Salvador gabacho is a deprecatory reference for someone from the U.S. In Mexico, el gabacho also identifies the U.S. as a place: "Voy para el gabacho" (I’m going to the U.S.). Moreover, in the Central American varieties of Spanish, the word gabacho refers to certain types of work-coats, such as the laboratory coat of a doctor, the smock of a kindergarten student, and a ceremonial vest worn in school-graduation ceremonies.

== Etymology ==
A possible root is the Catalan word gavatx meaning foreigner. Another possible root derives from the Occitan word gavach, meaning "someone who speaks with a faulty speech" or "someone who doesn't speak properly". This is the official position of the Diccionario de la lengua española.

Robert A. Geuljans, etymologist, agrees with the connection between "gabacho" and the Aquitanian and Catalonian origins by considering that the origin of all, gabacho, gavatx and gavach comes from the Occitan word for "goiter", a disorder common in the French Pyrenees caused by vitamin deficiency that impairs the ability to speak. Pilgrims afflicted had been traveling from France to Spain since the Middle Ages, to follow the Camino de Santiago hoping for a miraculous cure.

The word may also derive from a mock transcription of the French word for a long coat, specifically for the coats of the French soldiers during the late 18th and early 19th century.

The Etymological Dictionary of the Spanish Language claims the word originated in the 16th century, meaning "rude hillmen", and "he speaks badly the local language". According to the Diccionario de Autoridades in 1734, it is used for the people who originate from the folds of the Pyrenees, because in certain times of the year, they migrated to the Kingdom of Aragon and other parts, where they work in the lowest parts of society.
