= Where the Air Is Clear =

1958 novel by Carlos Fuentes

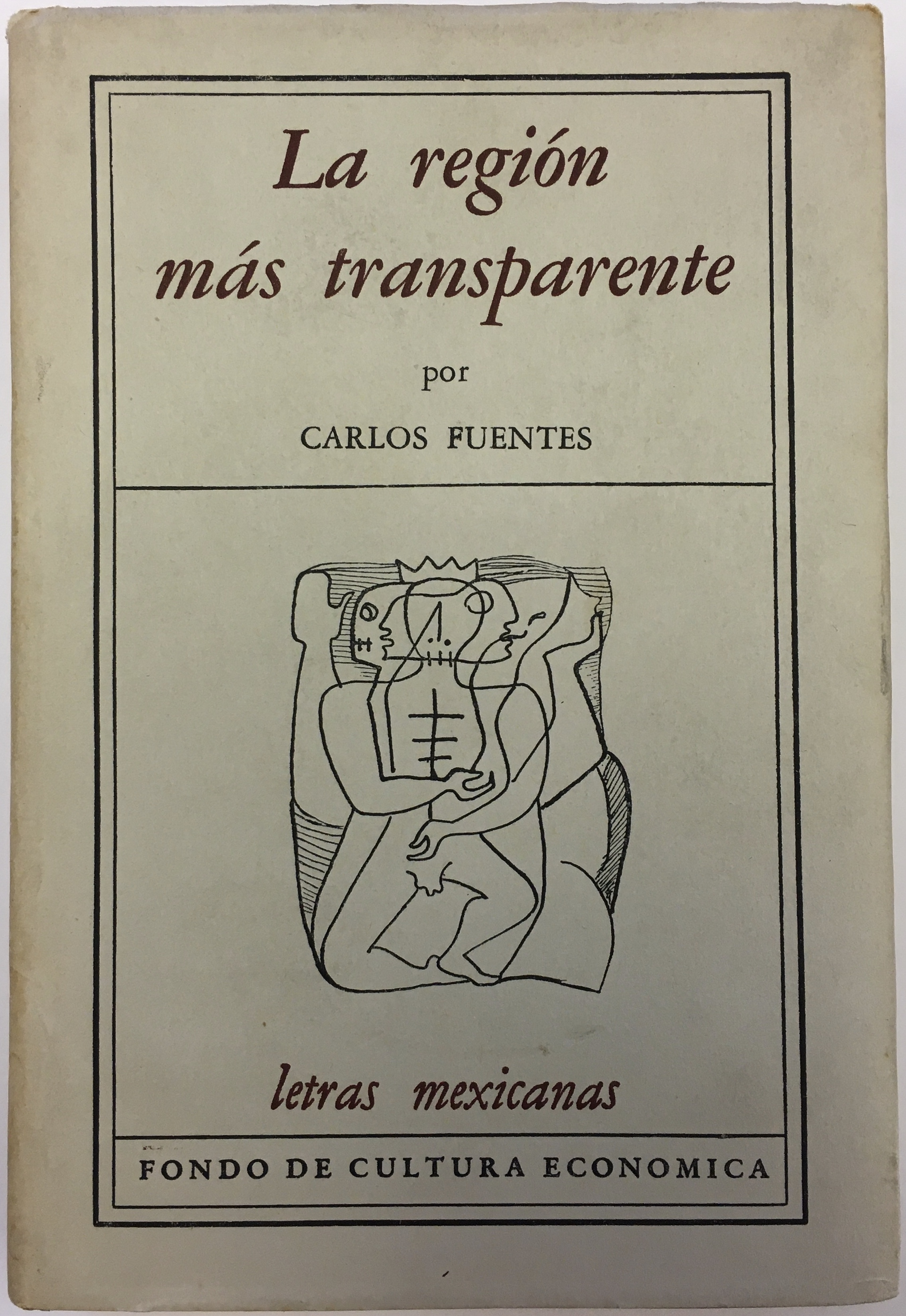
- First edition (FCE)
- Author: Carlos Fuentes
- Original title: La región más transparente
- Translator: Sam Hileman
- Language: Spanish
- Set in: Mexico City in the 1950s
- Publisher: Fondo de Cultura Económica
- Publication date: 1958
- Publication place: Mexico City

Where the Air Is Clear (original Spanish title: La región más transparente) is a 1958 novel by Mexican writer Carlos Fuentes. His first novel, it became an "instant classic" and made Fuentes into an immediate "literary sensation". The novel's success allowed Fuentes to leave his job as a diplomat and become a full-time author.

The novel is built around the story of Federico Robles – who has abandoned his revolutionary ideals to become a powerful financier – but also offers "a kaleidoscopic presentation" of vignettes of Mexico City, making it as much a "biography of the city" as of an individual man. It was celebrated not only for its prose, which made heavy use of interior monologue and explorations of the subconscious, but also for its "stark portrait of inequality and moral corruption in modern Mexico".

In November 2008, the Royal Spanish Academy, together with Spanish academies from all the world, released a special edition of the book to celebrate its 50th anniversary.

== See also ==
- 1958 in literature
- Mexican literature
