= Old Gringo =

1989 romantic adventure film

- Theatrical poster
- Directed by: Luis Puenzo
- Screenplay by: Aída Bortnik; Luis Puenzo
- Based on: The Old Gringo by Carlos Fuentes
- Produced by: Lois Bonfiglio
- Starring: Jane Fonda; Gregory Peck; Jimmy Smits
- Cinematography: Félix Monti
- Edited by: William M. Anderson; Glenn Farr; Juan Carlos Macías
- Music by: Lee Holdridge
- Distributed by: Columbia Pictures
- Release date: October 6, 1989
- Running time: 119 minutes
- Country: United States
- Language: English
- Budget: $26 million
- Box office: $3,574,256

Old Gringo is a 1989 American romantic adventure film starring Jane Fonda, Gregory Peck, and Jimmy Smits. It was directed by Luis Puenzo and co-written with Aída Bortnik, based on the 1985 novel The Old Gringo by Mexican novelist Carlos Fuentes.

The film was screened out of competition at the 1989 Cannes Film Festival.

== Plot ==
American schoolteacher Harriet Winslow goes to Mexico to work as a governess for the Miranda family and becomes caught up in the Mexican Revolution. The Mexicans transporting her from Chihuahua, secretly soldiers in Pancho Villa's army, use her luggage to smuggle weapons to the servants at the Miranda hacienda. The servants, in turn, aid the attacking revolutionary army of General Tomas Arroyo. During the attack, a sardonic "Old Gringo," American author Ambrose Bierce, joins the fighting on the side of the revolutionaries; he operates a railway switch that sends a railroad flatcar laden with explosives to its target.

After the Miranda hacienda is taken, Winslow becomes romantically attracted, alternating between Bierce and Arroyo. Bierce has come to Mexico to die in anonymity, feeling that his fifty years as a writer have earned him praise only for his style, not for the truth he has tried to convey. Arroyo, by contrast, has returned to the hacienda where he was born. His father was a Miranda who had raped his peasant mother, and later in his youth, Arroyo murdered his father.

While his army enjoys previously unknown luxuries on the war-damaged palatial estate, Arroyo becomes obsessed with his past. Transfixed by childhood memories of his family buried there, he fails to move his army when ordered by Villa. To bring Arroyo to his senses and avert a mutiny among his officers, Bierce burns papers that the illiterate Arroyo considers sacred—documents that supposedly entitle the peasants to the hacienda land. In response, Arroyo shoots Bierce in the back, killing him. Bierce dies in Winslow's arms.

Winslow goes to the U.S. embassy in Mexico to claim Bierce's body and bring it back to the United States. She claims that he was her long-lost father. This puts Villa in a predicament, as a U.S. citizen has been murdered by one of his generals. Wishing to avoid American interference in the revolution, Villa has Winslow sign a statement that her father had joined the revolution and was executed for disobeying orders, as was General Arroyo, who had shot him, and that she witnessed both executions. She signs the statement, is provided with the coffin bearing Bierce's body, and witnesses Arroyo's execution.

== Cast ==
- Jane Fonda as Harriet Winslow
- Gregory Peck as Ambrose Bierce
- Jimmy Smits as General Tomas Arroyo
- Pedro Armendariz Jr. as Pancho Villa
- Anne Pitoniak as Mrs. Winslow
- Jenny Gago as La Garduna
- Patricio Contreras as Colonel Frutos Garcia
- Jim Metzler as Ron
- Gabriela Roel as La Luna
- Sergio Calderón as Zacarias
- Guillermo Ríos as Monsalvo
- Samuel Valadez De La Torre as Consul Saunders
- Pedro Damián as Captain Ovando

== Production ==
Ennio Morricone was hired to compose the music for the film but left shortly after accepting, because he agreed to work on Cinema Paradiso instead after reading the script proposed by producer Franco Cristaldi.

Burt Lancaster was signed to star in the film but his contract was terminated in December 1987 after Columbia could not secure insurance for him. Lancaster sued Columbia for $1.5 million for terminating his contract without good cause.

Filming was completed in May 1988 and the film was initially scheduled for release at Christmas 1988 but was delayed until fall the following year, supposedly due to the need for more post-production time and to enable Columbia to properly position and market the film.

== Reception ==
Before its release in theatres, the film was booed at the 1989 Cannes Film Festival.

Roger Ebert in the Chicago Sun-Times said: "There is a potentially wonderful story at the heart of Old Gringo, but the movie never finds it--the screenplay blasts away in every direction except the bulls-eye. ... It's heavy on disconnected episodes, light on drama and storytelling." Janet Maslin in The New York Times said: "... the film's version of romance is no less aimless than its battle scenes. ... The sly, cantankerous character of Ambrose Bierce, an aged cynic surprised and delighted to find himself vibrantly alive and at last in control of his own destiny, reveals in Mr. Peck something vigorous and new." On Rotten Tomatoes, the film has an approval rating of 54% based on reviews from 13 critics. Audiences surveyed by CinemaScore gave the film a grade B on scale of A to F.

The film was a box-office failure. Jane Fonda received a nomination for the Golden Raspberry Award for Worst Actress for her performance in the film, where she ended up losing to Heather Locklear for The Return of Swamp Thing at the 10th Golden Raspberry Awards.
