= Margaret Sayers Peden =

American translator and professor (1927–2020)

Margaret ("Petch") Sayers Peden (May 10, 1927 – July 5, 2020) was an American translator and professor emerita of Spanish at the University of Missouri. Prior to her death in 2020, Peden lived and worked in Columbia, Missouri.

== Early life and education ==
Peden was born at West Plains, Missouri, daughter of horseman Harvey Monroe Sayers and Eleanor Green (née James), and grew up in many towns across Missouri. She was educated at William Woods University at Fulton, Missouri for two years, then studied at the University of Missouri, where she took bachelors, masters, and PhD degrees.

== Career ==
After finishing her studies at the University of Missouri, Peden joined the Romance Languages Department, where she taught until her retirement.

Peden's work covers nearly every genre — poetry, novel, theater and belles lettres — from the 16th century to today. Peden received her bachelor's (1948), master's (1963) and doctorate (1966) from the University of Missouri. She started translating while working toward her doctorate in 1964. Peden was writing on Mexican playwright Emilio Carballido and came across a small novel Carballido had written. Peden shared the book with her former late husband, William Peden, who said, "You know I don't read Spanish. Why don't you translate it for me?" So she did.

Carballido's The Norther (El Norte) became her first published translation in 1970. She continued translating and teaching at the University of Missouri until she retired from teaching in 1989. She still translated works until her death.

In 2010, Peden's translation of Fernando de Rojas' La Celestina won the 2010 Lewis Galantiere Translation Prize, which the American Translators Association awards every other year to a book-length literary translation.

In 2012, she received the Ralph Manheim Medal for Translation from the PEN American Center. Named in honor of U.S. translator Ralph Manheim, this literary award is given every three years to a translator whose career has demonstrated a commitment to excellence through the body of her work. The medal is awarded in recognition of a lifetime achievement in the field of literary translation.

Throughout Peden's career, she translated more than 60 books from Spanish to English and is considered one of the leading translators of her time.

== Personal life ==
She married first, in 1949, Robert Jackson Norwine (1924–2018), a real estate broker and dean of students at the New College of Florida from 1965 to 1967, with whom she had a son, Kyle, and daughter, Kerry. They were divorced in 1961. She married secondly William Harwood Peden (1913–1999), professor of English at the University of Missouri, writer, founder of the University of Missouri Press, and a key player in the creation of The Missouri Review; together they raised Peden's two daughters and her son and daughter by Robert Norwine. William Peden died in 1999. In 2002, Peden married Robert Harper, who survived her.

== Selected translations ==
- Emilio Carballido
  - The Norther, 1968
- Carlos Fuentes
  - Terra Nostra 1976
  - The Hydra Head, 1978
  - Burnt Water, 1980
  - Distant Relations, 1982
  - The Old Gringo, 1985
  - Inez, 2002
- Sor Juana Inés de la Cruz
  - Woman of Genius, the Intellectual Biography of Sor Juana Inés de la Cruz, 1982
  - Sor Juana Inés de la Cruz: Poems, 1985
  - Poems, Protest, and a Dream, 1996
- Isabel Allende
  - Of Love and Shadows, 1987
  - The Stories of Eva Luna, 1991
  - Paula, 1995
  - Aphrodite: A Memoir of the Senses, 1998
  - Daughter of Fortune, 1999
  - Portrait in Sepia, 2001
  - City of the Beasts, 2002
  - My Invented Country, 2003
  - Zorro, 2005
  - Inés of My Soul, 2007
  - Island Beneath the Sea, 2010
- Octavio Paz
  - Sor Juana Inés de la Cruz or The Traps of Faith, 1988
- Pablo Neruda
  - Passions and Impressions, 1983
  - Elemental Odes, 1990
- Juan Rulfo
  - Pedro Páramo, 1994
- Arturo Pérez-Reverte
  - The Nautical Chart, 2001
  - Captain Alatriste, 2005
  - Painter of Battles 2008
- Claribel Alegría
  - Casting Off, 2003
- Antonio Muñoz Molina
  - Sepharad, 2003
- Alfredo Castañeda
  - My Book of Hours, 2006
- Cesar Vallejo
  - Spain, Take This Chalice From Me, 2008
- Fernando de Rojas
  - La Celestina, 2009

== Awards and honors ==
- 2012 PEN/Ralph Manheim Medal for Translation
- 2011 Gala at the meeting of the American Literary Translators Association
- 2010 Lewis Galantiere Translation Prize
- 2004 PEN Translation Prize
- 1988 Homenaje offered by Feria Internacional del Libro, American Literary Translators Association and La Universidad de Guadalajara, Mexico
- 1992 Gregory Kolovakos Award from PEN
- 1985 The University of Missouri Presidential Award for Research
- 1983 Resident Scholar, Rockefeller Study and Conference Center, Bellagio, Italy
- 1979-86 Catherine Paine Middlebush Chair of Romance Languages
