= Daughter of Fortune =

1998 novel by Isabel Allende

- First edition (Spanish)
- Author: Isabel Allende
- Original title: Hija de la fortuna
- Translator: Margaret Sayers Peden
- Language: Spanish
- Publisher: Plaza & Janés (Spanish), Harper Collins
- Publication date: 1998 (Spanish) 1999 (English)
- Media type: Print (hardcover)
- Pages: 428
- ISBN: 0-06-019492-8 (hardback edition)
- OCLC: 41431043

Daughter of Fortune (Spanish: Hija de la fortuna) is a novel by Isabel Allende, and was chosen as an Oprah's Book Club selection in February 2000. It was published first in Spanish by Plaza & Janés in 1998. Isabel Allende says "of her female protagonist in Daughter of Fortune, Eliza, that she might well represent who the author might have been in another life." "Allende spent seven years of research on this, her fifth novel, which she says is a story of a young woman's search for self-knowledge." "Allende also believes that the novel reflects her own struggle to define the role of feminism in her life." Allende also wrote a sequel to Daughter of Fortune entitled Portrait in Sepia which follows Eliza Sommers' granddaughter.

== Plot summary ==
In Chile during the 1840s, young Chilean Eliza Sommers is raised and educated by English Anglican siblings Rose, Jeremy, and John Sommers. The Victorian-Spinster Rose, strict Jeremy, and sailor John live in the port of Valparaíso after discovering Eliza on their doorstep. Eliza is taught about the art of cooking by the Mapuche Indian, Mama Fresia. Over most of Part I, Eliza's origins and upbringing, and her maturity are told. Eliza falls in love with Joaquin Andieta, a young Chilean man who is concerned about his mother who is living in poverty. The young couple have an affair, ultimately resulting in Eliza getting pregnant. Soon, news of gold being discovered in California reaches Chile, and Joaquin goes out to California in search of a fortune. Wanting to follow her lover, Eliza goes to California, with the help of Chinese zhong yi (physician), Tao Chi'en, who later becomes her friend, in the bowels of a ship headed by a Dutch Lutheran captain, Vincent Katz.

In the beginning of Part II, Tao's past is revealed, from his early life in poverty, to his apprenticeship to a master acupuncturist, and his ill-fated marriage to Lin, a young and pretty, but frail girl who dies after a brief marriage. Lin's spirit later comes in to help her widowed husband at crucial points for Tao in later parts of the book. During the journey to California, Eliza, due to her pregnancy, is frail and sick, and later suffers a miscarriage. To leave the ship without suspicion, Tao disguises Eliza as a Chinese boy, a disguise that she maintains in San Francisco where they have landed. Eliza earns money by selling some Chilean snacks and Tao becomes a successful zhong yi. Tao, after seeing the greed and brothels in San Francisco, loses most of his faith in America. Eliza sets on her journey to find Joaquin, using a male cowboy's disguise and the moniker Elias Andieta, and claiming to be Joaquin's brother. Meanwhile, in Valparaíso, Rose and Jeremy are shocked to find that Eliza has disappeared. When John comes and asks about her whereabouts, Rose reveals a well-kept, shocking secret to Jeremy, a secret that she and John have concealed from him since Eliza's arrival into their home: John is Eliza's father, having had her with an unnamed Chilean woman. Based on intuition, John Sommers sails for San Francisco, commissioned by his wealthy employer Paulina Rodriguez de Santa Cruz as a steam ship captain, with the additional intent of finding his daughter.

Part III finds Eliza broke after still trying to search for Joaquin; she occasionally sends letters to Tao describing what she sees in her journey. Although she has fallen out of love with Joaquin, she cannot stop journeying. In an outskirt town, Eliza meets up with Joe Bonecrusher's travelling caravan of prostitutes and ends up travelling with them as cook and piano player. The members of the caravan believe Eliza to be a homosexual man, a disguise which she takes up much to the frustration of Babalu, the caravan's bodyguard. Eliza stays with the group during the winter as they settle in a small town. During this time, Tao moves to San Francisco to save up money to move back to China. He surprises himself when he realises that he misses Eliza's company and is consoled when he begins receiving her letters. John Sommers, in his search for Eliza, comes across Jacob Todd, an old suitor of Rose's who is now a journalist known as Jacob Freemont.

Freemont promises that he will look out for any sign of Eliza as he writes articles about the famous bandit Joaquin Murieta, whose description matches Eliza's lover. Meanwhile, as Joe Bonecrusher's business begins to dwindle, Tao finds Eliza and returns to San Francisco with her. They set up a network to help young Chinese prostitutes to escape and rehabilitate with the help of friends. Eventually Jacob Freemont is able to pass word to the Sommers that Eliza, who was previously thought to be dead, is alive. Tao and Eliza live together and eventually form a relationship; she eventually decides to write to Rose to inform her foster mother that she is alive. When Joaquin Murieta is shot dead and his preserved head is showcased in San Francisco, Eliza goes to see if the man was really Joaquin Andieta.

== Main characters ==
Eliza Sommers
Eliza Sommers is a headstrong, half Chilean, half English girl abandoned at birth at the home of the Sommers. She is adopted and raised in part by Rose Sommers and also by Mama Fresia, the Sommers' servant and cook. She has an excellent sense of smell and a very detailed and accurate memory. She is the daughter of John Sommers, and only after she disappears to California do Rose and John tell Jeremy about this. Her mother is unknown, and believed to be a prostitute. She was recognized as John's daughter because of the jacket wrapped around her, which was the one he used to cover up the prostitute with months before.

Rose Sommers
Incredibly beautiful, Rose Sommers never married after an affair at a young age with an opera singer ended. She has raised Eliza as her own; although she did not wish to marry, she wanted children. She is a charming and vivacious woman, and capricious towards raising Eliza, though she does love and care for her in the way she thinks is best.

Jeremy Sommers
Jeremy is the oldest of the Sommers. He is solid and stern, taking care to never show emotion. Jeremy and Rose live together under unspoken conditions where she takes care of the house and he provides necessities. Despite his stoic and stubborn nature, he will concede to Rose under enough duress.

John Sommers
John is a captain of a ship and later a steamboat carrying supplies to California. He is a free spirit and the "loosest" of the Sommers, enjoying good drinks and women. He travels to many places and brings back gifts for Rose and for Eliza after she is born.

Mama Fresia
Mama Fresia is the Mapuche cook for the Sommers. No one pays much attention to her except for Eliza who benefits from her cooking skills as well as superstitions. Eventually Mama Fresia helps Eliza run away and then disappears herself.

Tao Chi'en
Tao Chi'en is a shanghaied zhong yi (physician) working as a cook on John Sommers' ship. Tao Chi'en cares for Eliza when she is found hidden and suffering from a miscarriage on the ship on which he is working. Once he has been dismissed from the captain's duty, Eliza comes to him to ask for him to help her follow her lover Joaquin Andieta to California. The two remain friends for life.

Joaquin Andieta
Joaquin is a young man who works for Jeremy Sommers, though is not known to him by name. He spends time with Jacob Todd talking about philosophy and freedom. He is a loyal and hard worker, trying his best to bring his mother into a better life. Joaquin meets Eliza when delivering something to the Sommers' house. They meet multiple times to talk, which leads to an affair. When Joaquin is struck by gold fever, he steals money and heads for California, but promises to return to ask to marry Eliza and to help his mother in moving her to a home where she can recuperate.

Jacob Todd/Freemont
Jacob is brought to Chile by a bet that he could not sell a specific number of Bibles in three months. Once he arrives he is distracted by the resisting Rose Sommers and lives off of money the local church gives him for his "mission work". Once he is unveiled as a fraud, Jacob takes off with what is left of his reputation. He ends up in California working as a journalist, though no more honest, and becomes famous for his pieces, especially those on the elusive bandit Joaquin Murieta.

Paulina Rodriguez de Santa Cruz y del Valle
The wife of a Chilean millionaire, Feliciano Rodriguez de Santa Cruz; because of Feliciano's lower status, her father Agustin de Valle was against their relationship and only through the discreet intervention of the couple's friend, Jacob Todd, were they able to marry and become wealthy. However, their continued success is due to Paulina's sharp business intuition, which her husband, though proud and headstrong, accepts as she has never been wrong. She becomes the owner of several steamships carrying fresh produce from Chile packed in glacial ice to California and employs John Sommers to captain the ship.

Joe Bonecrusher
The madam of the travelling brothel, who employs Eliza as a piano player and cook for her group, who all believe that Eliza is an effeminate homosexual man. Joe is tough and fearless, able to inspire respect from her girls, their bodyguard Babalu the Bad, and Joe's ward, Tom No-Tribe, and eventually townsfolk who disapprove of the brothel but are indebted to Joe because she has accepted and taken care of the sick.

Joaquin Murieta
A legendary vigilante whose infamy circulates throughout California. Eliza is never certain if he is Joaquin Andieta, but follows his deeds in her pursuit to find her lover.

== Themes and Issues ==
- Obsession (Love, Gold Fever)
- Freedom (that which she & Tao found vs. that unrealistic Utopia of young Joaquin Andieta).
- Love (True vs. "Fairy Tale" love)
