= The Death of Artemio Cruz =

1962 novel by Carlos Fuentes

- Cover of the first edition
- Author: Carlos Fuentes
- Original title: La muerte de Artemio Cruz
- Translator: Sam Hileman, Alfred MacAdam
- Language: Spanish
- Set in: Mexico, 1889–1960
- Publisher: Fondo de Cultura Económica
- Publication date: 1962
- Publication place: Mexico City
- English publication date: 1964
- Media type: Print
- Pages: 316
- OCLC: 221360824
- Dewey Decimal: 863.64

The Death of Artemio Cruz (original Spanish title: La muerte de Artemio Cruz, pronounced [aɾˈtemjo ˈkɾus]) is a historical novel published in 1962 by Mexican writer Carlos Fuentes. An English translation by Sam Hileman was published in 1964, and a new translation by Alfred MacAdam in 1991. It is considered to be a milestone in the Latin American Boom.

== Plot summary ==
On his deathbed in his large mansion, Artemio Cruz thinks in the first-person about his corrupt life and his decomposing body. Artemio's family crowds around, pressing him to reveal the location of his will. He rejects the insistent priest who wants to give him last rites, having long since separated from the Church. His private secretary has come with audiotapes of various corrupt dealings, many with gringo diplomats and speculators. Punctuating the sordid record of betrayal is Cruz's awareness of his failing body and his keen attachment to sensual life. His thoughts decay into a drawn-out death. Each chapter ends with segments of stream of consciousness in the second-person.

In the third-person, the novel narrates the events of his life in non-chronological order, having fought in the Mexican Revolution, marrying his wife Catalina, cheating on her with various women, witnessing the development of the Institutional Revolutionary Party, and taking over the land from landowners in Puebla. He remembers serving as a corrupt deputy and imagines a story from his son Lorenzo, who died in the Spanish Civil War.

The novel ends with a scene from Artemio's childhood, having been born to a mulatta named Isabel Cruz, raped by the landowner Atanasio Menchaca. Isabel's brother Lunero raised Artemio in a hut by a river after Atanasio killed Isabela. Lunero was the servant to Atanasio's mother Ludivinia and brother Pedro. When Artemio learned that a recruiter would take Lunero to another hacienda, he took a shotgun to protect him, only to kill Pedro by accident. Lunero tries to talk to Artemio, but he escapes and hears someone shoot Lunero. Artemio runs away to Veracruz, where he joins the Revolution.

== Themes and significance ==
The Death of Artemio Cruz is today "widely regarded as a seminal work of modern Spanish American literature". Like many of Fuentes' works, the novel used rotating narrators, a technique critic Karen Hardy described as demonstrating "the complexities of a human or national personality". The novel is heavily influenced by Orson Welles' Citizen Kane, and attempts literary parallels to Welles' techniques, including close-up, cross-cutting, deep focus, and flashback. Like Kane, the novel begins with the titular protagonist on his deathbed; the story of Cruz's life is then filled in by flashbacks as the novel moves between past and present. Cruz is a former soldier of the Mexican Revolution who has become wealthy and powerful through "violence, blackmail, bribery, and brutal exploitation of the workers". The novel explores the corrupting effects of power and criticizes the distortion of the revolutionaries' original aims through "class domination, Americanization, financial corruption, and failure of land reform".

The Death of Artemio Cruz is dedicated to the sociologist C. Wright Mills, whom Fuentes called "the true voice of North America and great friend in the struggle for the people in Latin America."

== Film rights ==
In 2012, Chatrone LLC optioned both film and television rights to the novel.

== Editions ==
- Fuentes, Carlos (2 February 2001). La muerte de Artemio Cruz (Spanish ed.). Suma. ISBN 978-84-663-0196-1.
- Fuentes, Carlos (May 1991). The Death of Artemio Cruz (English translation ed.). Atlantic Books. ISBN 978-0-374-52283-4.
