= Silvia Lemus =

Silvia Lemus Covarruvias (born January 24, 1945) is the host of the interview television programme Tratos y Retratos. She is the widow of Mexican novelist Carlos Fuentes, and served alongside her husband as Mexico's Ambassador to the United States and France.

Lemus was born to the aristocratic Lemus de Mier family, founders of the Banco de Mexico and Dukes of Mier, and as such a cousin of Rainier III, Prince of Monaco on the Mier-Polignac line. The Mier Municipality and Mier City are both named after Lemus' ancestors, namely Don Francisco de Mier y Torre, 25th Governor of Nuevo León, and Don Servando Teresa de Mier. In 1972, she married Fuentes, and they travelled to France and the United States as Mexico's Ambassadors. The United States Central Intelligence Agency kept a file on Lemus de Fuentes and her husband because of their political relations.

Together, Carlos and Silvia had two children, Carlos and Natasha, deceased aged 25 and 30. Silvia and her husband then founded the "Carlos y Natasha Fuentes Lemus Foundation". They primarily resided in London, but spent part of the year traveling between New York, Mexico and Europe.

Lemus de Fuentes gained recognition when she started Tratos y Retratos; Beyond the fame, there is a human being, an internationally acclaimed television show in which she interviewed her friends and other high profile figures. Amongst the interviewees are Robert Redford, Anthony Quinn, Carlos Montemayor, Henry Kissinger, José Saramago, Salman Rushdie, Eric Hobsbawm, Fernando Botero, Susan Sontag, Toni Morrison, Steven Spielberg, Antonio Banderas, Isabel Allende and Mia Farrow, as well as her husband's long-time friend Gabriel García Márquez. There are 52 programs in all, traveling through the diversity of peoples, geographies, scenarios, periods, times and cultures.

Silvia is commonly seen in tabloid publications in the company of celebrated figures, such as King Juan Carlos of Spain and Hillary Clinton. More recently she was seen at the wedding of King Felipe VI of Spain.

On May 15, 2012, Carlos Fuentes died in Angeles del Pedregal hospital in southern Mexico City from a massive haemorrhage. Silvia led a state funeral for her husband the following day alongside the Mexican President, gathering crowds of thousands, an honor usually reserved only to former heads of state.
