= The Crystal Frontier =

Book by Carlos Fuentes

- First edition (Alfaguara)
- Author: Carlos Fuentes
- Original title: La frontera de cristal
- Translator: Alfred MacAdam
- Language: Spanish
- Publisher: Alfaguara (Spanish); Harvest Books (English)
- Publication date: 1995
- Publication place: Mexico City
- English publication date: 1997
- Media type: Print (Hardback & Paperback)
- Pages: 309
- ISBN: 978-0-15-600620-0
- OCLC: 38752885

The Crystal Frontier (original Spanish title: La frontera de cristal) is a 1995 novel written by Mexican writer Carlos Fuentes. The title can also be translated as "The Glass Border". An English translation, by Alfred MacAdam, was published in 1997.

== Basic plot ==
A series of short stories which explores relationships between people of Mexico and the United States. There are many connections between the stories, such as characters that appear in multiple stories (the most prominent of which is the wealthy Mexican businessman, Leonardo Barroso). A major, recurring theme in the text is that large parts of the USA were once part of Mexico, all the way from California to Texas, and so the Mexican people feel a special connection with that area. Another important idea is that both countries depend on each other for trade and culture, and many people divide their time and their lives between both sides of the border.

In the second story a Mexican student goes to medical school in New York state, where he finds that people there know nothing about the conditions in Mexico, but feel ready to make judgments.

== Index ==
The novel is made up of nine short stories, which take place on both sides of the Rio Grande/Río Bravo. The stories are:

1. La capitalina (translated as "A Capital Girl")
2. La pena (translated as "Pain")
3. El despojo (translated as "Spoils")
4. La raya del olvido (translated as "The Line of Oblivion")
5. Malintzin de las maquilas (translated as "Malintzin of the Maquilas")
6. Las amigas (translated as "The Friends")
7. La frontera de cristal (translated as "The Crystal Frontier")
8. La apuesta (translated as "The Bet")
9. Río Grande, Río Bravo

== Story Summaries ==
La capitalina The protagonist, Michelina, is a young woman who grew up in Mexico City and is the daughter of a very old Mexican family. Her family has become poor over time, but still sticks to the aristocratic traditions and values. The very rich man Leonardo Barroso from northern Mexico offers his “protection” services to the family as Michelina's godfather. To seal the deal, he invites Michelina up to his northern town Campazas for a visit, to meet his son Marianito, with whom Michelina will be set up to get married. There is emphasis on the contrast between Mexico City (which is presumed to be polished) and northern Mexico (which seems more liberal, but also flaunts the accessibility to the border and the U.S... Location is POWER!). There is also some problematization of expected gender roles and familial relationships... Michelina frequently reflects on female purity and subtlety (most prominently exemplified in her fixation on old-fashioned clothing, especially the crinoline, and on Mexico's historical connection to Catholicism and especially nuns), but she is also a confident and strong woman. In turn, Marianito is supremely introverted and timid and doesn’t know how to deal with women; he just wants to be left alone. Meanwhile, Michelina and her father-in-law-to-be are totally crushing on each other. However, anything can be bought, and Michelina agrees to marry Marianito; the story ends with their wedding, after which Michelina and Leonardo flit across the border to the U.S. and hook up at last.

La pena Juan Zamora is the main character; the narrator tells Juan's story in a first person voice, while Juan "keeps his back to us". Juan is a 23-year-old medical student from Mexico who goes to Cornell University for a postdoc. This is during the early 1980s, when Mexico has its oil peak and the Salvadoran Civil War is getting started. Money is a big theme, because Mexico has money from the oil peak yet still isn’t managing it well and is still corrupt. The theme of money and how to use it touches Juan personally since his father was a rare honest lawyer and his mother always resented him for not using bribes to make the family rich. After father's death, Juan's mother asked boss-man Leonardo Barroso (from story “La capitalina”) to give Juan a grant for Cornell as a favor. Juan goes to live with an American Republican family, the Wingates, who are huge fans of Reagan and his policies of interference in Central America. At Cornell, Juan struggles to understand American society and to fit in, and to do so, he lies and says he's rich (from a Mexican landowners background). However, he only really fits in when he meets Jim, and they start dating. They try to focus on the present but there are glimpses of the huge cultural divide between them, and the Wingate family disapproves of their homosexuality. Eventually Jim breaks up with Juan because he has a certain future to maintain as part of the American aristocratic elite, and Juan abandons his studies and goes home to Mexico. Four years later, the Wingate family travels to Mexico and they have the idea to surprise Juan with a visit... they go to his address and are surprised that it's a dumpy little apartment complex, and Juan's not in. Juan, meanwhile, has a recurring dream of being with Jim at Cornell and committing suicide together.

El despojo Dionisio "Baco" Rangel is a Mexican chef who loves Mexican cuisine and looks down on most other cuisines, especially that of the United States. He teaches cooking classes at U.S. universities on two tours each year, but feels that his students cannot appreciate Mexican food. In his view, good cooking is based on patience, time and roots in the pueblo, while U.S. cuisine is based on abundance and speed, as is U.S. society as a whole, which he sees as centered on abundance, consumption and waste. Dionisio begins compulsively "consuming" American products himself, accumulating junk, and visits U.S. fast food restaurants to observe their many obese customers. He becomes sexually attracted to fat white women but does not know how to approach them, so instead he goes to an American restaurant (a link between food and sex). There, a genie comes out of a bottle of salsa de chile, and Dionisio asks for a different woman with each plate he orders: a bored anorexic girl from New York, an excitable and childlike woman in her 40s, a beautiful but unhappy businesswoman who talks constantly on her cellphone, a radiant, unpretentious and intelligent woman who has adopted a little girl from Mexico, a talkative divorced woman in her 30s, and finally an angry obese woman who champions the "Fat Liberation Movement". Dionisio leaves the restaurant to escape her and sees a mannequin of a stereotypical napping Mexican man. He goes to tear it down as racist, but discovers that it is a real Mexican man who got lost in the mall ten years earlier and has stayed there working ever since. Dionisio takes him back to the restaurant to look for the radiant woman, but she has gone, because the plate of food that represented her has been thrown away. The two men set off for the Mexican border, discarding their accumulated American possessions along the way, and on reaching the border Dionisio smells Mexican food.

La raya del olvido The first person narrator is an old man sitting on a wheelchair, who doesn’t know who he is or where he is. He distinguishes that there is a dividing line, which he is straddling; this line is the U.S.-Mexico border, and he is torn between the U.S. and Mexico, not accepted in either. He is very confused, but eventually remembers his wife, Camelia, and then slowly starts to remember everything else. The narrator was a supporter of the fight for social justice (and particularly rights for immigrants); meanwhile his brother Leonardo Barroso (**intertextuality) totally played the system to get rich. The narrator's children hated him because he didn’t help them get financial success playing the system due to his social justice convictions. The narrator's children have chosen the U.S. over Mexico... and they have abandoned him anonymously as a reject communist. The narrator observes the border; it is in constant and unending flux, and the immigrants are at the mercy of the U.S. market. When they’re needed for labor, they’re welcomed, while when there are too many of them, they are shunned. Finally, at the end of the story, the narrator is picked up by an ambulance; there are finally people who want to help him, and he finally remembers who he is: Emiliano Barroso.

Malintzin de las maquilas The protagonist Marina is a young woman who has come to the border city of Ciudad Juárez to work at a factory (maquiladora). She is dating a powerful macho man named Rolando, who she constantly obsesses over (worrying about his womanizer reputation), and whom she sees once a week (Thursdays) in a hotel across the border. The story all takes place on a Friday, starting in the morning with Marina's commute to the factory. Along the way, she hooks up with her work companions and friends: Dinorah (single mom), Rosa Lupe (married but her husband doesn’t work, takes care of the kids), and Candelaria (older, 30-year-old woman who has been educated by her mature lover and is very vocal about women getting fair working treatment). At the factory, they complain and swap stories, and compare their obligations and their backgrounds; they’re all from different areas of Mexico. On this particular day, Rosa Lupe is wearing religious garb, and the older female supervisor strips it off her in public and sexually assaults her; a male supervisor comes over and breaks it up so Rosa Lupe lets him see her change clothes as a thank you, then they go on break. Meanwhile, the company owner Leonardo Barroso chats with North American execs about the success of the factory system, and how it's liberating for Mexican women (B.S.), and then suggests the get-rich scheme to buy cheap land then sell it for tons of money to build more factories there. The women get off work and go out dancing at a club for Friday night girls’ night out. They watch the Chippendale male dancers there, and Dinorah gets irritated for some reason and leaves. When the women leave the club, they hear tragic news: Dinorah's young son has died; he strangled himself because she left him tied up to a table in her home while she was at work all day. Marina is desperate and fixates on her desire to go to the beach with Rolando to see the sea... she can’t get in touch with him on his cellphone so she goes to the Texas hotel to see him. She finds him having sex with a gringa and discovers his famous cellphone isn’t even real; he just has it to look powerful. She is totally disillusioned and the story ends with her crossing the bridge back to Juárez, while Leonardo Barroso and his daughter-in-law Michelina pass her on their way into El Paso.

Las amigas The ancient and very difficult widow Miss Amy Dunbar lives alone in Chicago, and she treats all her servants terribly, and only maintains her relationship with her sole nephew Archibald under the threat of disinheriting him. She has had several black servants that she ran out of the house, so Archibald, who is now dating a Mexican woman in his international relationship line-up, suggests that she get a Mexican servant. Archibald is a lawyer and is working on the case of an immigrant who was falsely accused of murder; his Chicana wife Josefina needs work to help him financially, so Josefina starts working for Miss Amy. Miss Amy seeks any way possible to offend/insult Josefina, but the Mexican maid is quite astute. One theme that arises continually is Josefina's strong Catholic faith: she keeps religious symbols in her room and Miss Amy scorns her as idolatrous. Miss Amy also attacks her based on race, suggesting that perhaps Josefina would like to be white. But Josefina continually deflects Miss Amy's attacks with patience and cleverness. Miss Amy eventually proposes that Josefina can have a party in the garden, then spies on the party; her repulsion is confirmed by the Mexicans’ sheer otherness, and she throws everyone out of the house. Nephew Archibald angrily accuses Miss Amy of purposefully humiliating Josefina. In his anger, he reveals that his father didn’t marry her because she was frigid and unloving, which left Amy to marry his brother instead. He then renounces his inheritance, and informs Miss Amy that Josefina's husband's appeal has been denied and he will have to stay in jail. Miss Amy, in her shock, expresses her sentiments of regret for Josefina's husband's fate to her maid, and then allows for a moment of intimacy/affection after Josefina declares that she will continue fighting for her husband, whom she will always faithfully love.

La frontera de cristal Story opens with the famous businessman Leonardo Barroso, who is on a flight to New York with his lover and daughter-in-law, Michelina. He's heading a post-NAFTA initiative to bring in migrant workers for a weekend and then take them back to Mexico (to address the need for labor force contrasted with the insistence that the immigrants be legal and the desire to not really have a bunch of Mexican immigrants around for good). The main character is Lisandro Chávez, a Mexican whose family was rich before the economic crash: this type of employment was never his plan, but he must repay the debts of his father's failed business any way he can. The economic crisis (post oil peak of 70s and early 80s, going through the 80s and 90s) changed everything... the country is corrupt and failed. Don Leonardo's thoughts about Lisandro represent the internal discrimination/racism that exists in Mexico: he seems him as more decent-faced because he's lighter skinned. Meanwhile, Michelina is presented as a sort of foil to Lisandro, because her family also fell in the economic crisis but her fate is different since she hooked up with Leonardo. Leonardo, Michelina, and the 93 workers arrive in New York, where they will be working cleaning office buildings over the weekend while all the normal workers are at home. The first job is to clean a huge glass building, and a lone woman (Audrey) has come in that day to work. She is separated from her husband and feels free just being able to be out of his grasp, in the office, alone... she forgot the workers would be there. She is in her office and Lisandro is cleaning on that floor; they start looking at each other and very subtly interacting with one another through the glass walls of the office building. She thinks that he seems like a courteous man, and starts to imagine how he would act with her, what he's like... meanwhile, he sees her as melancholy, which contrasts with his vision of gringas as strong and confident. He wishes he could tell her that his true identity doesn’t match the appearance, this type of work was never his plan. They more and more obviously stare at one another, and then she gets a lipstick and writes her name on the glass that separates them. He hesitates and then only writes his nationality, rather than his name: “Mexican.” Then they kiss through the glass, but, when she opens her eyes, he's gone.

La apuesta We follow two plotlines simultaneously in this story, switching back and forth. The first one is of a Mexican tour chauffeur/guide named Leandro; today he has a tour to Cuernavaca with three people: a Spanish woman, and a Mexican guy, and a gringa who are a couple. He has a very bad attitude and is irritated that this dark-skinned Mexican is with the gringa when he's not... yet the Spanish woman observes him and calls him out on his behavior. Leandro meets some guys at the gas station and tries to act macho and smooth but the Spanish woman, Encarna, totally humiliates him. Yet, they start a conversation and Leandro shares his history (was totally held back by his father and had to drag himself out of his humble past), and they connect, and end up sleeping together when they get back to D.F., then they start a long-distance relationship and keep in touch through letters. Leandro randomly meets Don Leonardo Barroso, who likes the way he drives and invites him to travel to Spain with him and Michelina to be their driver. Leandro agrees and arranges to meet Encarna; they have a happy reunion and she plans to return to Mexico with him, and they decide to take a trip to Madrid for the weekend. Meanwhile, there's a group of guys in Spain (unnamed) who constantly make bets and challenge each other and pick on the town idiot, Paquito. Fuentes places you at the forefront of this group, and you end up severely beating Paquito (frustration at being stuck in this small town with no future) to the point that he dies... Paquito's father comes wanting vengeance and challenges the one who beat up his son... A bet: they have to drive through a tunnel towards each other in the wrong lane... whoever comes out alive gets the money. In the tunnel, the two plot lines collide... Leandro and Encarna are in the tunnel at the same time as you and Paquito's father... CRASH, and the story ends thus.

Río Grande, río Bravo This story provides snapshots into various characters' lives in their interaction with the border. Simultaneously, it provides a history of the border zone and the relationship between the United States and Mexico centered around this area. Characters include:

- Benito Ayala: a young Mexican immigrant preparing to cross the border, whose father, grandfather, and great-grandfather immigrated before him
- Dan Polonsky: a white border patrolmen with European immigrant ancestry, who is fiercely racist against Mexicans
- Margarita Barroso: a Mexican factory supervisor who lives in El Paso, Texas, and works in Ciudad Juárez, Chihuahua, and tries to pass as white ("Margie")
- Serafín Romero: a Robin Hood figure who breaks into U.S. trains and steals goods, and stows away immigrants so they can enter the U.S.
- Eloíno and Mario: Mario is a border patrolmen with Mexican parents; one night he sees "Eloíno" trying to cross the border and when the young man says the patrolman is his long lost godfather, Mario lets him through
- Juan Zamora: from story "La pena," is a Mexican doctor who studied at Cornell University, and has now decided to come to the border zone to provide medical services to immigrants
- José Francisco: a subversive Chicano writer
- Gonzalo Romero: a "coyote" (passes illegal immigrants over the border)
- Leonardo Barroso: a wealthy Mexican businessman who is included in several of the stories of this collection

== See also ==
- 1995 in literature
- Mexican literature
