= A Change of Skin =

Book by Carlos Fuentes

- Author: Carlos Fuentes
- Original title: Cambio de piel
- Translator: Sam Hileman
- Language: Spanish
- Genre: Romance
- Published: 1967 (Joaquín Mortiz) (Spanish); 1968 (Farrar, Straus and Giroux) (English)
- Publication place: Mexico City
- Media type: Print
- Pages: 442 (first edition)
- OCLC: 349483
- Dewey Decimal: 863
- LC Class: PQ7297.F793 C28

A Change of Skin (original Spanish title: Cambio de piel) is a 1967 novel by Carlos Fuentes about a Mexican writer and his Jewish American wife. The English translation, by Sam Hileman, was first published in 1968.

Fuentes dedicated the novel to Julio Cortázar.

== Plot ==
This is the story about a frustrated Mexican writer named Javier and his Jewish American wife, Elizabeth. The couple is making their way from Mexico City to Veracruz for a vacation. A man named Franz (a Czechoslovak who helped construct the Nazi concentration camp, Theresienstadt Ghetto and thereafter fled to Mexico) is with them, along with his young Mexican mistress, Isabel.

Once the two couples have left Mexico City, they visit the pre-Columbian ruins at Xochicalco and then the pyramids at Cholula. Their car is sabotaged, forcing them to spend the night in Cholula. There they are joined by the ubiquitous Narrator, who is also en route to Cholula, just to complicate matters even more.

== Acclaim for the book ==
- "At any rate, politically objectionable or not, Fuentes has written a challenging and interesting, if occasionally silly and pretentious, book." – David Gallagher, The New York Times
- "defines existentially a collective Mexican consciousness by exploring and reinterpreting the country’s myths." – Encyclopædia Britannica
- "...human history is envisioned as an obsessively repeated mythic drama or cycle." – Edith Grossman, "Myth and Madness in Carlos Fuentes' 'A Change of Skin'"
- It received the 1967 Premio Biblioteca Breve for best unpublished novel.
