= Carlos Fuentes Lemus =

Mexican writer, photographer, painter and director

Carlos Fuentes Lemus (1973–1999) was a Mexican writer, photographer, painter and director. He was the son of famous Mexican writer Carlos Fuentes and interviewer Silvia Lemus.

== Life ==
He lived in the United States from 1978 to 1985 with his parents. At age five he won the Shankar Award of infant drawing in New Delhi, India. In 1986, he published his first poems in the magazine of the Perse School. He attended the Ecole des Roches in Verneuil-sur-Avre, France, in academic year 1985–86, along with his sister, Natasha Fuentes. He lived in London until 1993 and in Cambridge, Massachusetts, from 1994 to 1995. In 1998, he published a book of pictures called Retratos del Tiempo along with his father.

In 1999, he died in Puerto Vallarta, Jalisco, of complications from hemophilia. He was with his fiancée Yvette Fuentes and her son, Alfredo Solis, at the time. He left an incomplete movie titled Gallo de Pelea. Expositions of his paintings and pictures were held in Madrid and Barcelona.
