= Gringo =

Pejorative term

Gringo (/ˈɡriːnɡoʊ/, Spanish: [ˈɡɾiŋɡo], Portuguese: [ˈɡɾĩɡu]) (masculine) or gringa (feminine) is a term in Spanish and Portuguese for a foreigner. In Spanish, the term usually refers to English-speaking Anglo-Americans. There are differences in meaning depending on region and country. Depending on usage, the term is sometimes considered derogatory, but is not always used to insult, and in the United States, its usage and offensiveness is disputed.

The word derives from the term used by the Spanish for a Greek person: griego. The earliest attestation in English is in John Woodhouse Audubon's Western Journal of 1849–1850, in which Audubon reports that his party was hooted and shouted at and called "Gringoes" while passing through the town of Cerro Gordo, Veracruz.

== Etymology ==
The word gringo originally referred to any kind of foreigner. It was first recorded in 1787 in the Spanish Diccionario castellano con las voces de Ciencias y Artes: (Note: "Castilian Dictionary including the Words of the Sciences and the Arts, and their Correspondents in Three Languages: French, Latin, and Italian")

GRINGOS, llaman en Málaga a los extranjeros, que tienen cierta especie de acento, que los priva de una locución fácil, y natural Castellana; y en Madrid dan el mismo, y por la misma causa con particularidad a los Irlandeses.

Gringos is what, in Malaga, they call foreigners who have a certain type of accent that prevents them from speaking Castilian easily and naturally; and in Madrid they give the same name, and for the same reason, in particular to the Irish.

The most likely theory is that it originates from griego ('Greek'), used in the same way as the English phrase "it's Greek to me". Spanish is known to have used Greek as a stand-in for incomprehensibility, though now less common, such as in the phrase hablar en griego (lit. 'to speak Greek'). The 1817 Nuevo diccionario francés-español, (Note: "New French–Spanish Dictionary") for example, gives gringo and griego as synonyms in this context:

... hablar en griego, en guirigay, en gringo.
Gringo, griego: aplícase a lo que se dice o escribe sin entenderse.

Translation:

... to speak in Greek, in gibberish, in gringo.
Gringo, Greek: applied to what is said or written but not understood.

This derivation requires two steps: griego > grigo, and grigo > gringo. Corominas notes that while the first change is common in Spanish (e.g. priesa to prisa), there is no perfect analogy for the second, save in Old French (Gregoire to Grigoire to Gringoire). However, there are other Spanish words whose colloquial form contains an epenthetic n, such as gordiflón and gordinflón ('chubby'), and Cochinchina and Conchinchina ('South Vietnam'). It is also possible that the final form was influenced by the word jeringonza, a game like Pig Latin also used to mean "gibberish".

Alternatively, it has been suggested that gringo could derive from the Caló language, the language of the Romani people of Spain, as a variant of the hypothetical *peregringo, 'peregrine', 'wayfarer', 'stranger'.

=== False etymologies ===
There are several false etymologies that purport to derive the origin of gringo from word coincidences. Many of these folk etymologies date the word to the Mexican–American War (1846–1848):

- Gringo is a result of American troops singing songs which began with "Green grows..." such as "Green Grow the Rushes, O", "Green Grow the Lilacs", and various others.
- Another theory involves locals yelling "Green, go home!" at invading American soldiers (sometimes in conflicts other than the Mexican–American War), in reference to their supposedly green uniforms.
- Another derives from the Irish "Erin go bragh" ("Ireland forever"), which served as the motto for Saint Patrick's Battalion who fought alongside the Mexican army.

== Regional usage ==
=== Argentina ===
The word gringo is mostly used in rural areas following the original Spanish meaning. Gringo in Argentina was used to refer to non-Spanish European immigrants who first established agricultural colonies in the country. The word was used for Swiss, German, Polish, Italian and other immigrants, but since the Italian immigrants were the larger group, the word primarily referred to Italians in the lunfardo argot. It also found use in the intermittent exercise Gringo-Gaucho between Argentine Naval Aviation and US Navy aircraft carriers.

=== Brazil ===
In Brazil, the word gringo means "foreigner" and has no connection to physical characteristics or specific countries. For example, foreign football players in the Brazilian Championship that come from other South American countries are referred to as "gringos" by the sports media and by sports fans. Tourists are called gringos regardless of their ethnic origins (i.e. Latin Americans or people from other regions, like Europe).

As the word has no connection to physical appearance in Brazil, black African or African American foreigners are also called gringos. Popularly used terms for fair-skinned and blond people are generally based in specific nationalities, like "alemão" (i.e., German), "russo" (Russian) or, in some regions, "polaco" (Polack) and "galego" (Galician) which are used for both Brazilians and foreigners with such characteristics, regardless of national or ethnic origins.

=== Chile ===
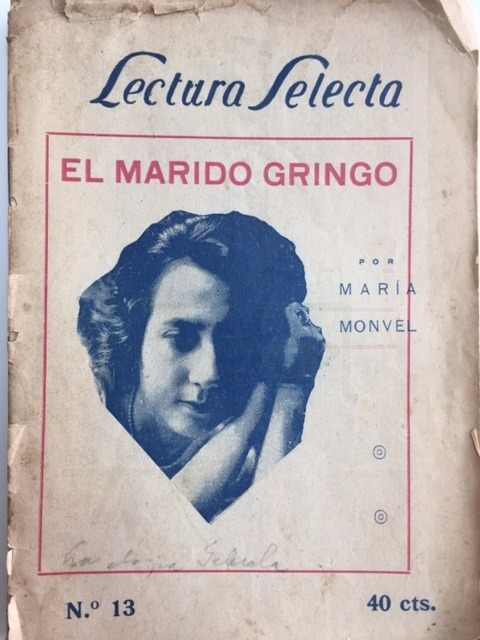
The Gringo Husband (Spanish: El marido gringo) by Chilean poet María Monvel (1926)

In Chile, the word gringo is mostly used to refer to people from the United States. The word Gringolandia is used colloquially as synonymous with the United States of America.

Sometimes, it is used for people from some English-speaking countries, like Great Britain or Canada.

=== Mexico ===
In Mexico, the use of the word "gringo" has been reserved for people from the U.S. (who belong to the country or are related to it), or also foreigners who have white skin, blond hair or European appearance. It is also used to refer to Hispanics who speak poor or no Spanish, or who are out of touch with their Latino roots.

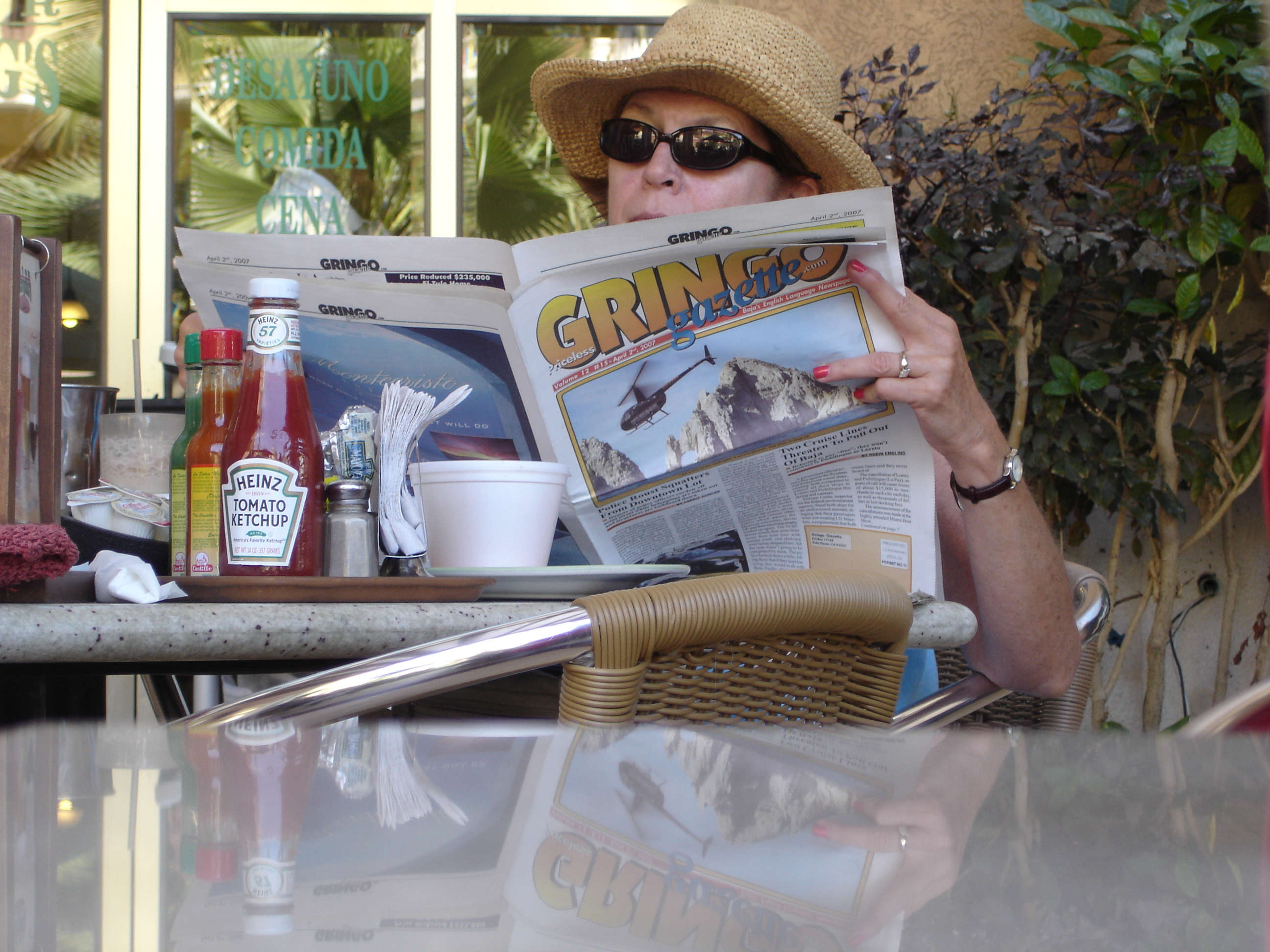
A woman reading the English-language Gringo Gazette in Baja California Sur, Mexico

The term is mentioned in its meaning of "incomprehensible language" from the 18th century (1789) to the 1830s, but also to indicate foreign troops, at first, coming from Spain in the second half of the 18th century. A text published in Mexico, but written by a Spaniard, denigrates a Mexican from Sonora for speaking "gringo", in reference to the indigenous language. After the Mexican–American War, gringo began to be used for citizens from that country, with expressions such as "American gringo" or simply gringo, attested as in popular use in Tepetitlán in 1849. Since then, gringo became a way to designate United States citizens exclusively.

The term is deeply rooted in Mexican culture and art; for example, in the novel The Old Gringo by Carlos Fuentes or in the songs Frijolero by Molotov, Somos Más Americanos by Los Tigres del Norte or the children's song El Raton Vaquero by Francisco Gabilondo Soler.

=== United States ===
In the United States, gringo is often used by Latino Americans to refer to Anglo Americans. Sometimes it is also used by Americans to refer to themselves. Among the US Latino communities it may also refer to another Latino person perceived to not be culturally Latino, e.g. unable to speak Spanish.

Columnist Alicia Shepard has argued that there is a disagreement between Hispanics and non-Hispanics about its offensiveness. She asserts that even though in Spanish it is defined as a neutral term and not as an insult, it should be avoided by "effective journalism" in the United States.

Gustavo Arellano said that the term is "technically a slur", but "its power to offend nowadays is minimal". He compared the ban on the term as an attempt to cancel aspects of Mexican culture.

== Other uses ==
=== Food ===
In Mexican cuisine, a gringa is a flour tortilla with al pastor pork meat with cheese, heated on a comal and optionally served with a salsa de chile (chilli sauce). Some attribute the name to the white flour used.

=== Activism ===
In 1969, José Ángel Gutiérrez, one of the leaders of the Mexican American Youth Organization, said his and MAYO's use of the term, rather than referring to non-Latinos, referred to people or institutions with policies or attitudes that reflect racism and violence.

== See also ==
- Anglo – Used as a synonym for non-Latino whites in the United States
- Gabacho – Spanish pejorative used in Spain for the French and in Mexico for the Americans
- List of ethnic slurs
- Yankee – Term for people from the United States
