= Margherita Guzzinati =

Italian actress and presenter

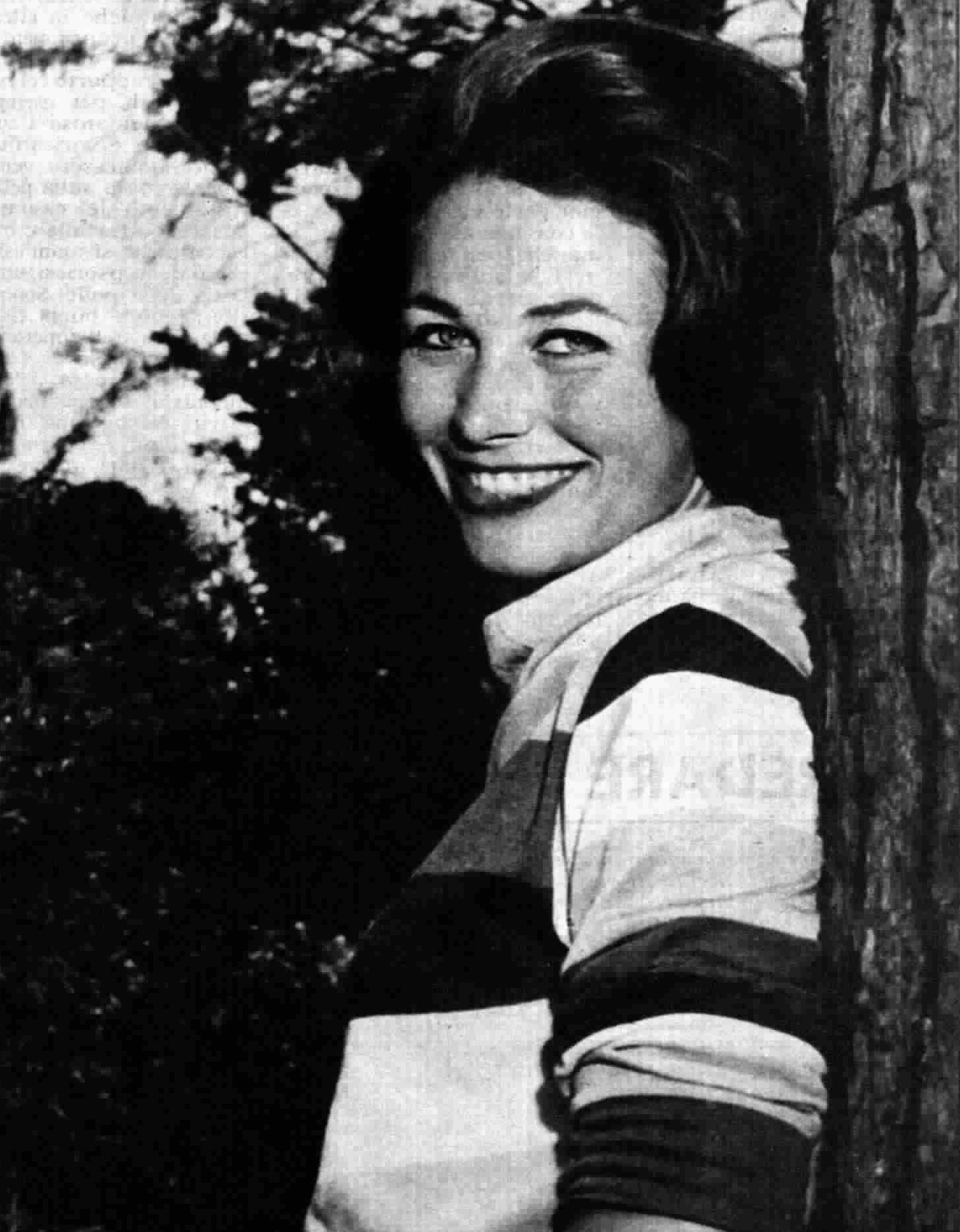
- Born: 18 May 1940; Rome, Kingdom of Italy
- Died: 31 October 1997 (aged 57); Rome, Italy
- Occupation: Actress

Margherita Guzzinati (18 May 1940 – 31 October 1997) was an Italian stage, television and film actress and television presenter.

== Life and career ==
Born in Rome, Italy, Guzzinati made her professional debut at young age, in the play Questa sera si recita a soggetto directed by Franco Enriquez. Specialized in the Goldonian repertoire, she often worked alongside Cesco Baseggio.

Rarely active in films, Guzzinati was well known for her television works, as a presenter of some RAI cultural programs and for her appearances in several major TV-series.
