= Carlos Fuentes =

Mexican writer (1928–2012)

Excelentísimo Señor Carlos Fuentes
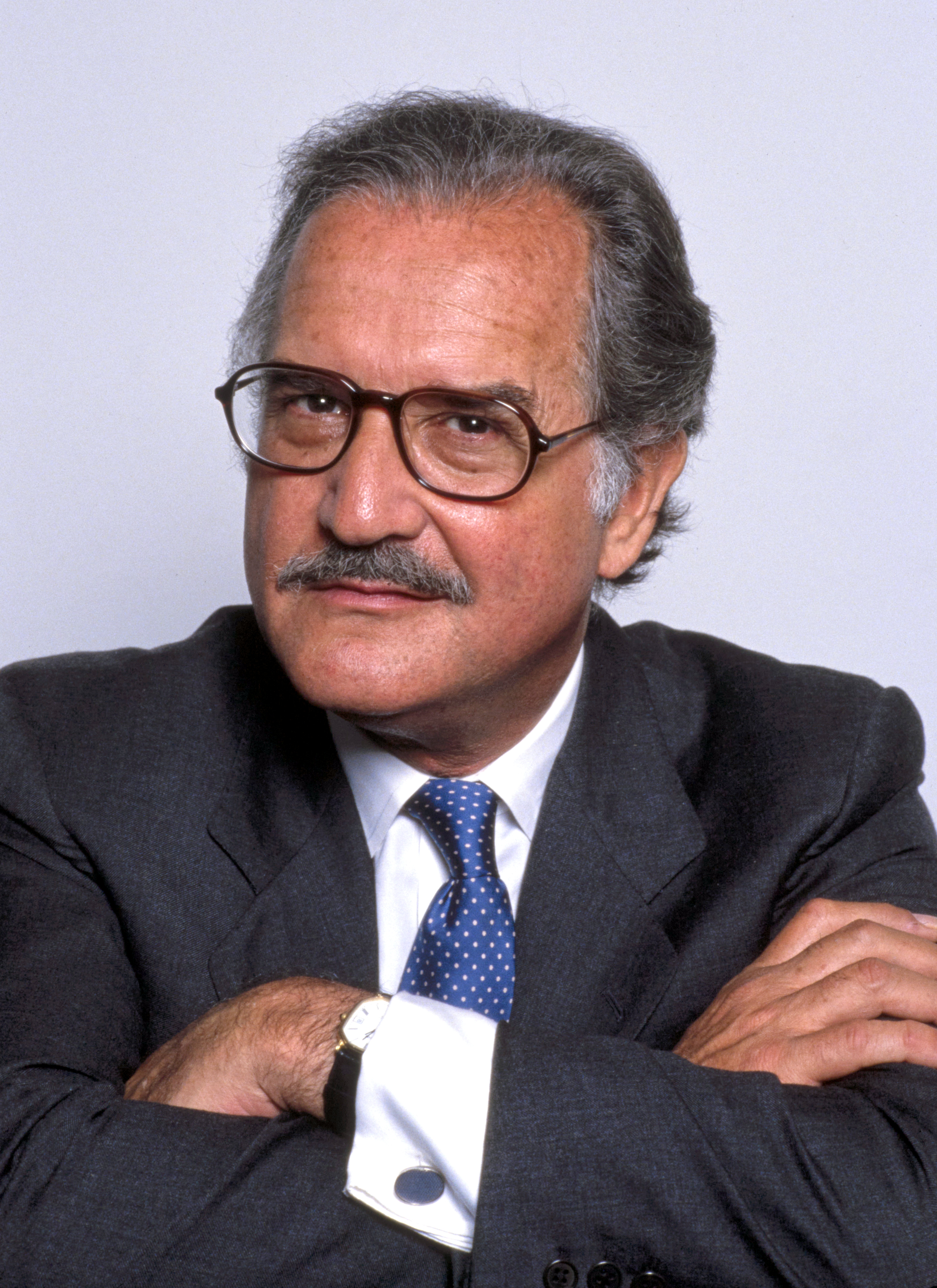
- Fuentes in 1987
- Born: Carlos Fuentes Macías; November 11, 1928; Panama City, Panama
- Died: May 15, 2012 (aged 83); Mexico City, Mexico
- Resting place: Montparnasse Cemetery, Paris
- Occupations: Novelist; writer
- Spouses: Rita Macedo (m. 1959–1973) Silvia Lemus (m. 1976)
- Children: Cecilia Fuentes Macedo (1962–); Carlos Fuentes Lemus (1973–1999); Natasha Fuentes Lemus (1974–2005)
- Writing career
- Period: 1954–2012
- Notable works: Where the Air Is Clear (1958); The Death of Artemio Cruz (1962); Terra Nostra (1975); The Old Gringo (1985)
- Movement: Latin American Boom

Carlos Fuentes Macías (/ˈfwɛnteɪs/; Spanish: [ˈkaɾlos ˈfwentes]; November 11, 1928 – May 15, 2012) was a Mexican novelist, essayist and ambassador to France. Among his works are The Death of Artemio Cruz (1962), Aura (1962), Terra Nostra (1975), The Old Gringo (1985) and Christopher Unborn (1987). In his obituary, The New York Times described Fuentes as "one of the most admired writers in the Spanish-speaking world" and an important influence on the Latin American Boom, the "explosion of Latin American literature in the 1960s and '70s", while The Guardian called him "Mexico's most celebrated novelist". His many literary honors include the Miguel de Cervantes Prize as well as Mexico's highest award, the Belisario Domínguez Medal of Honor (1999). He was often named as a likely candidate for the Nobel Prize in Literature, though he never won.

== Life and career ==
Fuentes was born in Panama City, the son of Berta Macías and Rafael Fuentes, the latter of whom was a Mexican diplomat. As the family moved for his father's career, Fuentes spent his childhood in various Latin American capital cities, an experience he later described as giving him the ability to view Latin America as a critical outsider. From 1934 to 1940, Fuentes' father was posted to the Mexican Embassy in Washington, D.C., where Carlos attended English-language school, eventually becoming fluent. He also began to write during this time, creating his own magazine, which he shared with apartments on his block.

In 1938, Mexico nationalized foreign oil holdings, leading to a national outcry in the U.S.; he later pointed to the event as the moment in which he began to understand himself as Mexican. In 1940, the Fuentes family was transferred to Santiago, Chile. There, he first became interested in socialism, which would become one of his lifelong passions, in part through his interest in the poetry of Pablo Neruda. He lived in Mexico for the first time at the age of 16, when he went to study law at the National Autonomous University of Mexico (UNAM) in Mexico City with an eye toward a diplomatic career. During this time, he also began working at the daily newspaper Hoy and writing short stories. He later attended the Graduate Institute of International Studies in Geneva.

In 1957, Fuentes was named head of cultural relations at the Secretariat of Foreign Affairs. The following year, he published Where the Air Is Clear, which immediately made him a "national celebrity" and allowed him to leave his diplomatic post to write full-time. In 1959, he moved to Havana in the wake of the Cuban Revolution, where he wrote pro-Castro articles and essays. The same year, he married Mexican actress Rita Macedo. Considered "dashingly handsome", Fuentes also had high-profile affairs with actresses Jeanne Moreau and Jean Seberg, who inspired his novel Diana: The Goddess Who Hunts Alone. His second marriage, to journalist Silvia Lemus, lasted until his death.

Fuentes served as Mexico's ambassador to France from 1975 to 1977, resigning in protest of former President Gustavo Díaz Ordaz's appointment as ambassador to Spain. He also taught at Cambridge, Brown, Princeton, Harvard, Columbia, University of Pennsylvania, Dartmouth, and Cornell. His friends included Luis Buñuel, William Styron, Friedrich Dürrenmatt, and sociologist C. Wright Mills, to whom he dedicated his book The Death of Artemio Cruz. Once good friends with Nobel-winning Mexican poet Octavio Paz, Fuentes became estranged from him in the 1980s in a disagreement over the Sandinistas, whom Fuentes supported. In 1988, Paz's magazine Vuelta carried an attack by Enrique Krauze on the legitimacy of Fuentes' Mexican identity, opening a feud between Paz and Fuentes that lasted until Paz's 1998 death. In 1989, he was the subject of a full-length PBS television documentary, "Crossing Borders: The Journey of Carlos Fuentes," which also aired in Europe and was broadcast repeatedly in Mexico.

Fuentes fathered three children, only one of whom survived him: Cecilia Fuentes Macedo, born in 1962. A son, Carlos Fuentes Lemus, died from complications associated with hemophilia in 1999 at the age of 25. A daughter, Natasha Fuentes Lemus (born August 31, 1974), died of an apparent drug overdose in Mexico City on August 22, 2005, at the age of 30.

== Writing ==
Carlos Fuentes has been called "the Balzac of Mexico". Fuentes himself cited Miguel de Cervantes, William Faulkner and Balzac as the most important writers to him. He also named Latin American writers such as Alejo Carpentier, Juan Carlos Onetti, Miguel Angel Asturias and Jorge Luis Borges. European modernists James Joyce, Virginia Woolf and Marcel Proust have also been cited as important influences on his writing, with Fuentes applying the influence from them on his main theme, Mexican history and identity.

Fuentes described himself as a pre-modern writer, using only pens, ink and paper. He asked, "Do words need anything else?" Fuentes said that he detested authors who from the beginning claim to have a recipe for success. In a speech on his writing process, he related that when he began the writing process, he began by asking, "Who am I writing for?"

=== Early works ===
Fuentes' first novel, Where the Air Is Clear (La región más transparente), was an immediate success upon its publication in 1958. The novel is built around the story of Federico Robles – who has abandoned his revolutionary ideals to become a powerful financier – but also offers "a kaleidoscopic presentation" of vignettes of Mexico City, making it as much a "biography of the city" as of an individual man. The novel was celebrated not only for its prose, which made heavy use of interior monologue and explorations of the subconscious, but also for its "stark portrait of inequality and moral corruption in modern Mexico".

A year later, he followed with another novel, The Good Conscience (Las Buenas Conciencias), which depicted the privileged middle classes of a medium-sized town, probably modeled on Guanajuato. Described by a contemporary reviewer as "the classic Marxist novel", it tells the story of a privileged young man whose impulses toward social equality are suffocated by his family's materialism.

=== Latin American boom ===
Fuentes was regarded as a leading figure of the Latin American boom in the 1960s and 1970s along with Gabriel García Márquez, Mario Vargas Llosa and Julio Cortázar.

Fuentes' novel The Death of Artemio Cruz (La muerte de Artemio Cruz) was published in 1962 and is "widely regarded as a seminal work of modern Spanish American literature". Like many of his works, the novel uses rotating narrators, a technique critic Karen Hardy described as demonstrating "the complexities of a human or national personality". The novel is heavily influenced by Orson Welles' Citizen Kane, and attempts literary parallels to Welles' techniques, including close-up, cross-cutting, deep focus, and flashback. Like Kane, the novel begins with the titular protagonist on his deathbed; the story of Cruz's life is then filled in by flashbacks as the novel moves between past and present. Cruz is a former soldier of the Mexican Revolution who has become wealthy and powerful through "violence, blackmail, bribery, and brutal exploitation of the workers". The novel explores the corrupting effects of power and criticizes the distortion of the revolutionaries' original aims through "class domination, Americanization, financial corruption, and failure of land reform".

A prolific writer, Fuentes' subsequent work in the 1960s include the novel Aura (1962), the short story collection Cantar de Ciego (1966), the novella Zona Sagrada (1967) and A Change of Skin (1967), an ambitious novel that attempts to define a collective Mexican consciousness by exploring and reinterpreting the country's myths.

Fuentes' 1975 Terra Nostra, perhaps his most ambitious novel, is described as a "massive, Byzantine work" that tells the story of all Hispanic civilization. Terra Nostra shifts unpredictably between the sixteenth century and the twentieth, seeking the roots of contemporary Latin American society in the struggle between the conquistadors and indigenous Americans. Like Artemio Cruz, the novel also draws heavily on cinematic techniques. The novel won the Xavier Villaurrutia Award in 1976 and the Venezuelan Rómulo Gallegos Prize in 1977.

It was followed by La Cabeza de la hidra (1978, The Hydra Head), a spy thriller set in contemporary Mexico and Una familia lejana (1980, Distant Relations), a novel that explores many themes including the relations between the Old world and the New.

=== Later works ===
Fuentes' 1985 novel The Old Gringo (Gringo viejo), loosely based on American author Ambrose Bierce's disappearance during the Mexican Revolution, became the first U.S. bestseller written by a Mexican author. The novel tells the story of Harriet Winslow, a young American woman who travels to Mexico, and finds herself in the company of an aging American journalist (called only "the old gringo") and Tomás Arroyo, a revolutionary general. Like many of Fuentes' works, it explores the way in which revolutionary ideals become corrupted, as Arroyo chooses to pursue the deed to an estate where he once worked as a servant rather than follow the goals of the revolution. In 1989, the novel was adapted into the U.S. film Old Gringo starring Gregory Peck, Jane Fonda, and Jimmy Smits. A long profile of Fuentes in the U.S. magazine Mother Jones describes the filming of "The Old Gringo" in Mexico with Fuentes on the set.

In the mid-1980s, Fuentes began to conceptualize his total fiction, past and future, in fourteen cycles called "La Edad del Tiempo", explaining that his total work was a lengthy reflection on time. The plan for the cycle first appeared as a page in the Spanish edition of his satirical novel Christopher Unborn in 1987, and as a page in his subsequent books with minor revisions to the original plan.

In 1992, Fuentes published The Buried Mirror: Reflections on Spain and the New World, an historical essay that attempts to cover the entire cultural history of Spain and Latin America. The book was a complement to a Discovery Channel and BBC television series by the same name. Fuentes work of nonfiction also include La nueva novela hispanoamericana (1969; "The New Hispano-American Novel"), which is his chief work of literary criticism, and Cervantes; o, la critica de la lectura (1976; "Cervantes; or, The Critique of Reading"), an homage to the Spanish writer Miguel de Cervantes.

His 1994 book Diana: The Goddess Who Hunts Alone is an autobiograpichal novel that portrays the actress Jean Seberg who Fuentes had a love affair with in the 1960s. It was followed by The Crystal Frontier, a novel in nine stories.

In 1999, Fuentes published the novel The Years With Laura Diaz. A companion book to The Death of Artemio Cruz, the characters are from the same period, but the story is told by a woman exiled from her province after the revolution. The novel includes some of Fuentes own family history in Veracruz and has been called "a vast, panoramic novel" dealing with "questions of progress, revolution and modernity" and "the ordinary life of the individual that struggles to find its place".

His later novels include Inez (2001), The Eagle's Throne (2002) and Destiny and Desire (2008). His writing also include several collections of stories, essays and plays.

Fuentes' works have been translated into 24 languages. He remained prolific to the end of his life, with an essay on the new government of France appearing in the newspaper Reforma on the day of his death.

Mexican historian Enrique Krauze was a vigorous critic of Fuentes and his fiction, dubbing him a "guerrilla dandy" in a 1988 article for the perceived gap between his Marxist politics and his personal lifestyle. Krauze accused Fuentes of selling out to the PRI government and being "out of touch with Mexico", exaggerating its people to appeal to foreign audiences: "There is the suspicion in Mexico that Fuentes merely uses Mexico as a theme, distorting it for a North American public, claiming credentials that he does not have." The essay, published in Octavio Paz's magazine Vuelta, began a feud between Paz and Fuentes that lasted until Paz's death. Following Fuentes' death, however, Krauze described him to reporters as "one of the most brilliant writers of the 20th Century".

== Political views ==
The Los Angeles Times described Fuentes' politics as "moderate liberal", noting that he criticized "the excesses of both the left and the right". Fuentes was a long-standing critic of the Institutional Revolutionary Party (PRI) government that ruled Mexico between 1929 and the election of Vicente Fox in 2000, and later of Mexico's inability to reduce drug violence. He has expressed his sympathies with the Zapatista rebels in Chiapas. Fuentes was also critical of U.S. foreign policy, including Ronald Reagan's opposition to the Sandinistas, George W. Bush's war on terror, U.S. immigration policy, and the role of the U.S. in the Mexican drug war.

Carlos Fuentes was one of several prominent writers who were denied entry to the United States under the McCarran–Walter Act. Others included Gabriel García Márquez, Czesław Miłosz, Arthur Miller, Graham Greene, Michel Foucault, and Pablo Neruda.

The U.S. State Department and the Federal Bureau of Investigation (FBI) closely monitored Fuentes during the 1960s, purposefully delaying — and often denying — the author's visa applications. Fuentes' FBI file, released on June 20, 2013, reveals that the FBI's upper echelons were interested in Fuentes' movements, because of the writer's suspected communist-leanings and criticism of the Vietnam War. After 1961 Fuentes was permitted to enter the United States only through a discretionary waiver of inadmissibility, while some writers, including García Márquez, refused such waivers on principle.

In 1963, after being denied permission to travel to a book release party in New York City, he responded: "The real bombs are my books, not me". Much later in his life, he commented that "The United States is very good at understanding itself, and very bad at understanding others."

In 1969, Fuentes was denied entry to Puerto Rico during a stopover on a transatlantic voyage from Barcelona to Veracruz. The Immigration and Naturalization Service informed him only that he had been designated "an undesirable alien" and provided no further explanation. The decision drew immediate public criticism because Fuentes was a critically acclaimed, bestselling author, and many Americans opposed the exclusion of foreign artists, scientists, and writers based on unsubstantiated suspicions of Communist Party membership.

Initially a supporter of Fidel Castro's Cuban Revolution, Fuentes turned against Castro after being branded a "traitor" to Cuba in 1965 for attending a New York conference and the 1971 imprisonment of poet Heberto Padilla by the Cuban government. The Guardian described him as accomplishing "the rare feat for a leftwing Latin American intellectual of adopting a critical attitude towards Fidel Castro's Cuba without being dismissed as a pawn of Washington." Fuentes also criticized Venezuelan President Hugo Chávez, dubbing him "a tropical Mussolini."

Fuentes' last message on Twitter read, "There must be something beyond slaughter and barbarism to support the existence of mankind and we must all help search for it."

== Death ==
On May 15, 2012, Fuentes died in Angeles del Pedregal hospital in southern Mexico City from a massive hemorrhage. He had been brought there after his doctor had found him collapsed in his Mexico City home.

Mexican President Felipe Calderón wrote on Twitter, "I am profoundly sorry for the death of our loved and admired Carlos Fuentes, writer and universal Mexican. Rest in peace." Nobel laureate Mario Vargas Llosa stated, "with him, we lose a writer whose work and whose presence left a deep imprint". French President François Hollande called Fuentes "a great friend of our country" and stated that Fuentes had "defended with ardour a simple and dignified idea of humanity". Salman Rushdie tweeted "RIP Carlos my friend".

Fuentes received a state funeral on May 16, with his funeral cortege briefly stopping traffic in Mexico City. The ceremony was held in the Palacio de Bellas Artes and was attended by President Calderón.

== List of works ==
=== Novels ===
- La región más transparente (Where the Air Is Clear) (1958) ISBN 978-970-58-0014-6
- Las buenas conciencias (The Good Conscience) (1961) ISBN 978-970-710-004-6
- Aura (1962) ISBN 978-968-411-181-3
- La muerte de Artemio Cruz (The Death of Artemio Cruz) (1962) ISBN 978-0-374-52283-4
- Cambio de piel (A Change of Skin) (1967)
- Zona sagrada (Holy Place) (1967)
- Cumpleaños (Birthday) (1969)
- Terra Nostra (1975)
- La cabeza de la hidra (The Hydra Head) (1978)
- Una familia lejana (Distant Relations) (1980)
- Gringo viejo (The Old Gringo) (1985)
- Cristóbal Nonato (Christopher Unborn) (1987)
- Ceremonias del alba (1991)
- La campaña (The Campaign) (1992)
- Diana o la cazadora solitaria (Diana: the Goddess Who Hunts Alone) (1995)
- La frontera de cristal (The Crystal Frontier: A Novel of Nine Stories) (1996)
- Los años con Laura Díaz (The Years With Laura Diaz) (1999)
- Instinto de Inez (Inez) (2001)
- La silla del águila (The Eagle's Throne) (2002)
- Todas las familias felices (Happy Families) (2006), ISBN 987-04-0557-6
- La voluntad y la fortuna (Destiny and Desire) (2008), ISBN 978-1400068807
- Adán en Edén (2009)
- Vlad (2010)
- Federico en su Balcón (2012) (posthumous)
- Aquiles o el guerrillero y el asesino (2016) (posthumous)

=== Short stories ===
- Los días enmascarados (1954)
- Cantar de ciegos (1964)
- Chac Mool y otros cuentos (1973)
- Agua quemada (Burnt Water) (1983) ISBN 968-16-1577-8
- Constancia and other Stories For Virgins (1990)
- Dos educaciones (1991) ISBN 84-397-1728-8
- El naranjo (The Orange Tree) (1994)
- Inquieta compañía (2004)
- Happy Families (2008)
- Las dos Elenas (1964)
- El hijo de Andrés Aparicio

=== Essays ===
- La nueva novela hispanoamericana (1969) ISBN 968-27-0142-2
- El mundo de José Luis Cuevas (1969)
- Casa con dos puertas (1970)
- Tiempo mexicano (1971)
- Miguel de Cervantes o la crítica de la lectura (1976)
- Myself With Others (1988)
- El Espejo Enterrado (The Buried Mirror: Reflections on Spain and the New World) (1992) ISBN 84-306-0265-8
- Geografía de la novela (1993) ISBN 968-16-4044-6
- Tres discursos para dos aldeas ISBN 950-557-195-X
- Nuevo tiempo mexicano (A New Time for Mexico) (1995) ISBN 968-19-0231-9
- Retratos en el tiempo, with Carlos Fuentes Lemus (2000)
- Los cinco soles de México: memoria de un milenio (2000) ISBN 84-322-1063-3
- En esto creo (2002) ISBN 970-58-0087-1
- Contra Bush (2004) ISBN 968-19-1450-3
- Los 68 (2005) ISBN 0307274152
- Personas (2012) ISBN 0307274152

=== Theater ===
- Todos los gatos son pardos (1970)
- El tuerto es rey (1970).
- Los reinos originarios: teatro hispano-mexicano (1971)
- Orquídeas a la luz de la luna. Comedia mexicana. (1982)
- Ceremonias del alba (1990)

=== Screenplays ===
- ¿No oyes ladrar los perros? (1974)
- Pedro Páramo (1967)
- Los caifanes (1966)
- Un alma pura (1965) (segment in Los bienamados)
- Tiempo de morir (1965) (written in collaboration with Gabriel García Márquez)
- Las dos Elenas (1964)
- El gallo de oro (1964) (written in collaboration with Gabriel García Márquez and Roberto Gavaldón, from a short story by Juan Rulfo)

== Reviews ==
- McCabe, Brian (1981), review of Burnt Water, in Cencrastus No. 6, Autumn 1981, p. 42

== Awards and recognition ==
- 1967 Biblioteca Breve Award for A Change of Skin
- 1972 Member of the Colegio Nacional
- 1972 Mazatlán Literature Prize for Tiempo mexicano (Fuentes refused the award in protest against the policies of the government of the state of Sinaloa against the student movement at the State University of Sinaloa)
- 1976 Xavier Villaurrutia Award for Terra Nostra
- 1977 Rómulo Gallegos Prize for Terra Nostra
- 1979 Alfonso Reyes International Prize
- 1983 Honorary Doctorate granted by Harvard University
- 1984 Mexican National Prize for Arts and Sciences
- 1984 Massey Lecture
- 1987 Miguel de Cervantes Prize
- 1987 Honorary Doctorate (Doctor of Letters) granted by the University of Cambridge
- 1989 Istituto Italo-Latino Americano Award for The Old Gringo
- 1992 National Order of Merit of France
- 1992 Menéndez Pelayo International Prize
- 1993 Commander of the Order of Merit of Chile
- 1993 Honorary Doctorate (Doctor of Letters) granted by Tufts University
- 1994 Grinzane Cavour Prize
- 1994 Prince of Asturias Award
- 1994 UNESCO's Pablo Picasso Medal
- 1999 Belisario Domínguez Medal of Honor
- 2001 Honorary Member of the Mexican Academy of Language
- 2004 Prize of the Real Academia Española for En esto creo
- 2005 Premio Galileo 2000 Prize
- 2006 Four Freedoms Award for Freedom of Speech and Expression
- 2006 Huizinga Lecture
- 2006 American Academy of Achievement's Golden Plate Award
- 2008 Internacional don Quijote de la Mancha Prize
- 2009 Great Cross of the Order of Isabella the Catholic
- 2011 Prix Formentor
- 2012 Creation of the Carlos Fuentes International Prize for Literary Creation in the Spanish Language by the Mexican government.

== See also ==
- Latin American literature

Awards
Preceded by José Angel Conchello Dávila	Belisario Domínguez Medal of Honor; 1999	Succeeded by Leopoldo Zea Aguilar
